= 2017–18 Videoton FC season =

Videoton
2017–18 season
- Chairman: István Garancsi
- Manager: Marko Nikolić
- Nemzeti Bajnokság I: 1st
- Magyar Kupa: Round of 32
- UEFA Europa League: Play-off round
- Top goalscorer: League: Danko Lazović (14); All: Marko Šćepović (17)
- Highest home attendance: 3,747 (vs Ferencváros, 5 May 2018)
- Lowest home attendance: 1,108 (vs Puskás Akadémia, 21 October 2017)
- Average home league attendance: 2,145
Home colours	Away colours	Third colours

The 2017–18 season was Videoton Football Club's 49th competitive season, 18th consecutive season in the Nemzeti Bajnokság I and 76th year in existence as a football club. In addition to the domestic league, Videoton participated in this season's editions of the Magyar Kupa and UEFA Europa League. The club won its third league title this season, two points ahead of closest challenger Ferencváros.

== First team squad ==
Note: Flags indicate national team as defined under FIFA eligibility rules; some limited exceptions apply. Players may hold more than one non-FIFA nationality.

No.	Pos.	Nation	Player
1	GK	HUN	Tamás Horváth
3	DF	HUN	Paulo Vinícius
5	DF	HUN	Attila Fiola
6	DF	HUN	András Fejes
7	FW	SRB	Danko Lazović
8	MF	BIH	Anel Hadžić
9	FW	CRO	Mirko Marić
10	MF	HUN	István Kovács
11	DF	FRA	Loïc Nego
17	MF	HUN	Máté Pátkai
18	MF	HUN	Bence Szabó
21	FW	NGR	Ezekiel Henty

No.	Pos.	Nation	Player
22	DF	CPV	Stopira
23	DF	HUN	Roland Juhász
25	DF	HUN	Krisztián Tamás
27	MF	HUN	Ádám Bódi
30	DF	HUN	Roland Szolnoki
31	MF	HUN	Dávid Barczi
33	MF	HUN	József Varga
44	FW	SRB	Marko Šćepović
49	MF	HUN	Krisztián Géresi
51	GK	HUN	András Hársfalvi
74	GK	HUN	Ádám Kovácsik
99	MF	BIH	Asmir Suljić

== Transfers ==
=== Summer ===
In: Note: Flags indicate national team as defined under FIFA eligibility rules; some limited exceptions apply. Players may hold more than one non-FIFA nationality.

No.	Pos.	Nation	Player
18	MF	HUN	Bence Szabó (from Puskás Akadémia)
21	FW	NGR	Ezekiel Henty (from (Russia) Lokomotiv Moscow)
23	DF	HUN	Krisztián Tamás (from Gyirmót)
51	GK	HUN	András Hársfalvi (from Zalaegerszeg)

Out: Note: Flags indicate national team as defined under FIFA eligibility rules; some limited exceptions apply. Players may hold more than one non-FIFA nationality.

No.	Pos.	Nation	Player
8	MF	HUN	Zsolt Pölöskei (to Budapest Honvéd)
13	GK	HUN	Illés Zöldesi (loan to Kisvárda)
14	MF	HUN	Zsombor Bévárdi (loan to Siófok)
46	MF	HUN	Ádám Simon (to Haladás)
95	DF	HUN	Márton Lorentz (loan to Siófok)

=== Winter ===
In: Note: Flags indicate national team as defined under FIFA eligibility rules; some limited exceptions apply. Players may hold more than one non-FIFA nationality.

No.	Pos.	Nation	Player
9	MF	HUN	Szabolcs Huszti (from (China) Changchun Yatai)
12	GK	SVK	Tomáš Tujvel (from Mezőkövesd)
14	FW	SRB	Stefan Šćepović (from (Spain) Getafe)
19	MF	MKD	Boban Nikolov (from (North Macedonia) Vardar)

Out: Note: Flags indicate national team as defined under FIFA eligibility rules; some limited exceptions apply. Players may hold more than one non-FIFA nationality.

No.	Pos.	Nation	Player
1	GK	HUN	Tamás Horváth (to Mezőkövesd)
6	DF	HUN	András Fejes (to Paks)
31	MF	HUN	Dávid Barczi (to Vasas)

== Competitions ==
=== Overview ===
Competition	First match	Last match	Starting round	Final position	Record							
Competition	First match	Last match	Starting round	Final position	Pld	W	D	L	GF	GA	GD	Win %
Nemzeti Bajnokság I	16 July 2017	2 June 2018	Matchday 1	Winners	33	20	8	5	65	28	+37	60.61
Magyar Kupa	20 September 2017	29 November 2017	Round of 128	Round of 32	3	2	0	1	9	3	+6	66.67
UEFA Europa League	29 June 2017	24 August 2017	First qualifying round	Play-off round	8	3	3	2	11	10	+1	37.50
Total					44	25	11	8	85	41	+44	56.82

Source: Competitions

=== Nemzeti Bajnokság I ===
==== League table ====
Pos	Team	Pld	W	D	L	GF	GA	GD	Pts	Qualification or relegation
1	Videoton (C)	33	20	8	5	65	28	+37	68	Qualification for the Champions League first qualifying round
2	Ferencváros	33	18	12	3	69	31	+38	66	Qualification for the Europa League first qualifying round (Note: Since the winners of the 2017–18 Magyar Kupa, Újpest, qualified for European competition based on league position, the spot awarded to the cup winners (Europa League first qualifying round) was passed to the fourth-placed team.)
3	Újpest	33	12	13	8	41	38	+3	49	Qualification for the Europa League first qualifying round
4	Honvéd	33	13	8	12	50	53	−3	47	Qualification for the Europa League first qualifying round
5	Debrecen	33	12	8	13	53	47	+6	44	

Source: Hungarian Football Federation (in Hungarian), Soccerway
Rules for classification: 1) Points; 2) Matches won; 3) Goal difference; 4) Goals scored; 5) Head-to-head points; 6) Head-to-head goal difference; 7) Head-to-head away goals scored; 8) Fair play ranking; 9) Drawing of lots.
(C) Champions

==== Results summary ====
Overall								Home						Away					
Pld	W	D	L	GF	GA	GD	Pts	W	D	L	GF	GA	GD	W	D	L	GF	GA	GD
33	20	8	5	65	28	+37	68	13	4	0	35	8	+27	7	4	5	30	20	+10

Source: HFF

==== Results by round ====
Round	1	2	3	4	5	6	7	8	9	10	11	12	13	14	15	16	17	18	19	20	21	22	23	24	25	26	27	28	29	30	31	32	33
Ground	H	A	H	A	H	A	H	H	A	H	A	A	H	A	H	A	H	A	A	H	A	H	H	A	H	A	H	A	H	H	A	H	A
Result	D	W	D	W	W	W	W	W	L	D	W	D	W	D	W	W	W	L	L	W	W	W	W	D	W	D	W	L	D	W	W	W	L
Position	9	4	6	2	2	1	1	1	1	1	1	1	1	2	1	1	1	1	2	2	1	2	2	2	2	2	1	2	2	1	1	1	1

Source: Matches
A = Away; H = Home; W = Win; D = Draw; L = Loss

==== Matches ====
16 July 2017 1	Videoton	1–1	Balmazújváros	Felcsút
17:00 CEST	Lazović 51'	Report	Andrić 17'	Stadium: Pancho Aréna; Attendance: 1,792; Referee: Zoltán Iványi

23 July 2017 2	Puskás Akadémia	1–3	Videoton	Felcsút
18:00 CEST	Diallo 2'	Report	Fejes 14'; Lazović 27'; Šćepović 60' (pen.)	Stadium: Pancho Aréna; Attendance: 1,983; Referee: Ádám Farkas

30 July 2017 3	Videoton	2–2	Újpest	Felcsút
18:00 CEST	Šćepović 86'; Hadžić 88'	Report	D. Nagy 7', 70'	Stadium: Pancho Aréna; Attendance: 2,374; Referee: Tamás Bognár

6 August 2017 4	Mezőkövesd	0–2	Videoton	Mezőkövesd
20:00 CEST		Report	Henty 23'; Lazović 85'	Stadium: Városi Stadion; Attendance: 2,300; Referee: Sándor Andó-Szabó

12 August 2017 5	Videoton	1–0	Debrecen	Felcsút
20:30 CEST	Lazović 90+6' (pen.)	Report		Stadium: Pancho Aréna; Attendance: 1,929; Referee: Viktor Kassai

27 August 2017 7	Videoton	3–1	Ferencváros	Felcsút
19:30 CEST	Pátkai 12' (yellow card) 59'; Lazović (yellow card) 27'; Šćepović (yellow card) 32' (goal) 49'; Stopira 83' (yellow card) 83'; Szolnoki (yellow card) 90+2'	Report	Batik (yellow card) 43'; Otigba (yellow card) 86'; Priskin 89'; Marquinhos Pedroso (yellow card) 90+2'	Stadium: Pancho Aréna; Attendance: 2,862; Referee: Péter Solymosi

6 September 2017 6	Paks	1–4	Videoton	Paks
19:30 CEST	Gévay (yellow card) 63'; Péter Zachán (yellow card) 68'; Bartha 76'	Report	Hadžić (yellow card) 24'; Suljić (yellow card) 28' (goal) 41'; Juhász (yellow card) 29'; Lazović 34'; J. Szabó 55' (o.g.); Nego 59'; Tamás (yellow card) 86'	Stadium: Fehérvári úti Stadion; Attendance: 800; Referee: Zoltán Iványi
Note: The match was postponed due to Videoton's participation in European competition.

10 September 2017 8	Videoton	3–1	Haladás	Felcsút
17:00 CEST	Fejes (yellow card) 39'; Lazović (yellow card) 48' (goal) 52'; Pátkai 63' (yellow card) 73'; Šćepović 89'; Juhász (yellow card) 90+3'	Report	Németh 35'; Myke Ramos (yellow card) 45'; Williams (yellow card) 58'	Stadium: Pancho Aréna; Attendance: 1,771; Referee: Gergely Szőts

16 September 2017 9	Vasas	3–1	Videoton	Budapest
18:00 CEST	Burmeister 22' 82'; Ristevski 28'; James (yellow card) 34'; Gaál (yellow card) 54'; Vogyicska (yellow card) 65'; Hangya (yellow card) 78'; Remili (yellow card) 82'	Report	Pátkai 12' (yellow card) 56'; Fiola (yellow card) 43'; Nego (red card) 89'; Lazović (red card) 90+4'	Stadium: Szusza Ferenc Stadion; Attendance: 2,000; Referee: Sandor Andó-Szabó

23 September 2017 10	Videoton	1–1	Budapest Honvéd	Felcsút
20:30 CEST	Hadžić 2'; Suljić (yellow card) 9'; Fejes (yellow card) 27'; Fiola (yellow card) 44'	Report	Lovrić (yellow card) 29'; Holender 39'	Stadium: Pancho Aréna; Attendance: 2,449; Referee: Tamás Bognár

30 September 2017 11	Diósgyőr	2–3	Videoton	Debrecen
18:00 CEST	Ugrai 17'; Karan (yellow card) 47'; Ioannidis 78'; Szarka (yellow card) 85'	Report	Henty (yellow card) 45' (goal) 71'; Hadžić 54'; Pátkai (yellow card) 56' (goal) 85'; Nego (yellow card) 90+1'; Stopira (yellow card) 90+4'	Stadium: Nagyerdei Stadion; Attendance: 1,322; Referee: Ádám Farkas

14 October 2017 12	Balmazújváros	1–1	Videoton	Balmazújváros
15:30 CEST	Andrić 43' (yellow card) 44'; Zsiga (yellow card) 80'; Horváth (yellow card) 80'	Report	Šćepović 11'; Vinícius (yellow card) 80'	Stadium: Városi Sportpálya; Attendance: 1,438; Referee: József Erdős

21 October 2017 13	Videoton	2–0	Puskás Akadémia	Budapest
15:30	Vinícius (yellow card) 50'; Fiola (yellow card) 50'; Henty (yellow card) 83' (goal) 90+1'; Juhász 88'; Lazović (yellow card) 90+2'	Report	Perošević (yellow card) 29'; Balogh (yellow card) 56'; Mevoungou (yellow card) 90+1'	Stadium: Hidegkuti Nándor Stadion; Attendance: 1,108; Referee: Viktor Kassai

28 October 2017 14	Újpest	2–2	Videoton	Budapest
15:30	Zsótér (yellow card) 45'; Pauljević 50'; Bence Pávkovics (yellow card) 64'; Tischler 71'; D. Nagy (yellow card) 74'; Sanković (yellow card) 82'	Report	Henty 1'; Hadžić 5' (red card) 8'; Šćepović (yellow card) 57'; Stopira (yellow card) 59'; Pátkai (yellow card) 62'; Suljić (red card) 89'	Stadium: Szusza Ferenc stadion Attendance: 1,593; Referee: Péter Solymosi

4 November 2017 15	Videoton	4–0	Mezőkövesd	Felcsút
15:30 CET (UTC+1)	Lazović 7' 66'; Henty 16'; Šćepović 36' (yellow card) 47'; Paulo Vinícius (yellow card) 61'	Report	Attila Szalai (yellow card) 13'; Tamás Cseri (yellow card) 25'	Stadium: Pancho Arena; Attendance: 1,347; Referee: Ferenc Karakó

18 November 2017 16	Debrecen	2–5	Videoton	Debrecen
19:30 CET (UTC+1)	Könyves 26'; Tőzsér (yellow card) 30'; Takács 90+2'	Report	Šćepović 11' (yellow card) 31' (goal) 58' 66' (pen.); Nego 22' (yellow card) 78'; Lazović (yellow card) 30'; Fejes (yellow card) 55'; Hadžić (yellow card) 58'; Géresi 82'	Stadium: Nagyerdei Stadion; Attendance: 3,169; Referee: Ádám Farkas

25 November 2017 17	Videoton	2–0	Paks	Felcsút
15:30 CET (UTC+1)	Hadžić (yellow card) 19'; Fejes (yellow card) 27'; Lazović 32' (pen.); Pátkai (yellow card) 38'; Nego 84'	Report	Simon (yellow card) 18'; Gévay (yellow card) 72'	Stadium: Pancho Arena; Attendance: 1,521; Referee: Viktor Kassai

2 December 2017 18	Ferencváros	3–1	Videoton	Budapest
19:30	Spirovski 34'; Paintsil 44'; Dibusz (yellow card) 54'; Leandro (yellow card) 81'; Moutari 82'	Report	Fiola (yellow card) 22'; Šćepović (yellow card) 36'; Juhász (yellow card) 41'; Lazović 74'	Stadium: Groupama Arena; Attendance: 9,384; Referee: Zoltán Iványi

9 December 2017 19	Haladás	1–0	Videoton	Szombathely
15:30	Wils (yellow card) 24'; Mészáros (yellow card) 90' (goal) 90+2'	Report	Nego (yellow card) 29'; Fejes (yellow card) 34'; Pátkai (yellow card) 67'; Hadžić (yellow card) 79'	Stadium: Haladás Sportkomplexum; Attendance: 5,500; Referee: Viktor Kassai

24 February 2018 20	Videoton	2–1	Vasas	Felcsút
17:00	Hadžić 26' (yellow card) 79'; Šćepović 60'; Lazović (yellow card) 70'; Fiola (yellow card) 90+3'	Report	Martin Ádám 40' (yellow card) 51'; Barczi (yellow card) 59' (yellow-red card); Ristevski (yellow card) 62'; Burmeister (yellow card) 88'	Stadium: Pancho Arena; Attendance: 1,525; Referee: Zsolt Szabó

10 March 2018 22	Videoton	4–1	Diósgyőr	Felcsút
19:30	Lazović 21' 27' (yellow card) 67'; Nikolov (yellow card) 24'; Pátkai (yellow card) 48'; Šćepović 58'; Fiola (yellow card) 75'; Nego 90+3'	Report	T. Nagy (yellow card) 73'; Óvári 78'; Ioannidis (yellow card) 83'	Stadium: Pancho Arena; Attendance: 2,107; Referee: István Vad

17 March 2018 23	Videoton	1–0	Balmazújváros	Felcsút
17:00 CET (UTC+1)	Huszti (yellow card) 76'; Juhász 84'; Šćepović (yellow card) 85'	Report	Andrić (yellow card) 53'; Rus (yellow card) 85'	Stadium: Pancho Arena; Attendance: 1,169; Referee: Ádám Farkas

31 March 2018 24	Puskás Akadémia	0–0	Videoton	Felcsút
17:00 CEST (UTC+2)	Zsidai (yellow card) 41'; Osváth (yellow card) 68'; Trajkovski (yellow card) 87'	Report	Juhász (yellow card) 11'; Fiola (yellow card) 25'; Hadžić (yellow card) 41'; Lazović (yellow card) 64'	Stadium: Pancho Arena; Attendance: 1,825; Referee: Zsolt Szabó

7 April 2017 25	Videoton	3–0	Újpest	Felcsút
19:30 CEST (UTC+2)	Šćepović 19'; Huszti 54'; Négo 84'	Report	Kálnoki-Kis (yellow card) 45'; D. Nagy (yellow card) 78'; Novothny (yellow card) 87'	Stadium: Pancho Arena; Attendance: 2,568; Referee: Sándor Andó-Szabó

11 April 2018 21	Budapest Honvéd	1–4	Videoton	Budapest
18:00 CET (UTC+1)	Lanzafame (yellow card) 34', (goal) 57'; Ikenne (yellow card) 43'	Report	Kovácsik (yellow card) 31'; Nikolov 35'; Huszti (yellow card) 43'; Juhász (yellow card) 50'; Lazović 54', 80'; Hadžić (yellow card) 57'; Négo (yellow card) 63'; Vinícius 65'	Stadium: Bozsik József Stadion; Attendance: 1,903; Referee: Tamás Bognár
Note: The match was originally scheduled to play on 3 March 2018, but was postponed due to the condition of the pitch.

14 April 2018 26	Mezőkövesd	0–0	Videoton	Mezőkövesd
17:00 CEST (UTC+2)	Dražić (yellow card) 17'; Tóth (yellow card) 30'; Cseri (yellow card) 35'	Report	Hadžić (yellow card) 21'; Juhász (yellow card) 32'; Fiola (yellow card) 54'; Pátkai (yellow card) 58'; Huszti (yellow card) 73'; Hadžić (yellow card) 78'; I. Kovács (yellow card) 79'	Stadium: Városi Stadion; Attendance: 2,325; Referee: Viktor Kassai

21 April 2018 27	Videoton	1–0	Debrecen	Felcsút
19:30 CEST (UTC+2)	Šćepović 20'; Vinícius (yellow card) 54'; Nikolov (yellow card) 61'; Stopira (yellow card) 65'; Lazović (yellow card) 88'	Report	K. Varga (yellow card) 82'; Szatmári (yellow card) 87'; Mengolo (yellow card) 90+2'	Stadium: Pancho Arena; Attendance: 2,524; Referee: István Vad

28 April 2018 28	Paks	1–0	Videoton	Paks
17:00 CEST (UTC+2)	Gévay (yellow card) 55'; Haraszti 67'; J. Szabó (yellow card) 72'	Report	Pátkai (yellow card) 18'; Juhász (yellow card) 58'; Nikolov (yellow card) 90+1'	Stadium: Fehérvári úti Stadion; Attendance: 2,000; Referee: Péter Solymosi

5 May 2018 29	Videoton	0–0	Ferencváros	Felcsút
19:30 CEST (UTC+2)	Nikolov (yellow card) 11'; Huszti (yellow card) 16'; Juhász (yellow card) 64'; Négo (yellow card) 83'; Lazović (red card) 90+4'	Report	Paintsil (yellow card) 51'; Pedroso (yellow card) 79'; Böde (yellow card) 89'; Gorriarán (red card) 90+2'	Stadium: Pancho Arena; Attendance: 3,747; Referee: Tamás Bognár

12 May 2018 30	Videoton	3–0	Haladás	Felcsút
17:00 CEST (UTC+2)	Nikolov 19'; J. Varga (yellow card) 27'; Fiola (yellow card) 32'; I. Kovács (yellow card) 53'; Négo 61'; Hadžić (yellow card) 70'; Pátkai 86'	Report	Kiss (yellow card) 14'; Király (yellow card) 25'; Rácz (yellow card) 51'; L. Kovács (red card) 70'	Stadium: Pancho Arena; Attendance: 1,977; Referee: Viktor Kassai

19 May 2018 31	Vasas	0–3	Videoton	Budapest
17:00 CEST (UTC+2)	James (yellow card) 23'; Egerszegi (yellow card) 24'; Ádám (yellow card) 32'; Murka (yellow card) 79'	Report	Šćepović 5'; Hadžić (yellow card) 23'; I. Kovács 57', (yellow card) 60'; Pátkai (yellow card) 77'; Tamás 90+2'	Stadium: Szusza Ferenc Stadion; Attendance: 1,200; Referee: Balázs Berke

27 May 2018 32	Videoton	2–0	Budapest Honvéd	Felcsút
19:30 CEST (UTC+2)	Pátkai (yellow card) 8'; Šćepović 27'; Hadžić (yellow card) 58'; I. Kovács (yellow card) 66'; Nikolov 79', (yellow card) 80'	Report	Heffler (yellow card) 26'; Lanzafame (yellow card) 90+1'	Stadium: Pancho Arena; Attendance: 3,700; Referee: Sándor Andó-Szabó

2 June 2018 33	Diósgyőr	2–1	Videoton	Miskolc
19:00 CEST (UTC+2)	Hasani (yellow card) 20'; Shestakov (yellow card) 45'; Brković 66'; Makrai 88'	Report	Pátkai (yellow card) 16'; Šćepović 76'; Bolla (yellow card) 80'	Stadium: Diósgyőri Stadion; Attendance: 10,143; Referee: Zoltán Iványi

=== Magyar Kupa ===
20 September 2017 Round of 128	Mohács	0–4	Videoton	Mohács
15:00 CEST (UTC+2)		Report	B. Szabó 6', 81'; Tamás 21'; Mocsi (yellow card) 25'; Fejes 43'	Stadium: Újvárosi Stadion; Attendance: 1,200; Referee: Attila Szommer

24 October 2017 Round of 64	Dabas	0–4	Videoton	Dabas
13:30 CEST (UTC+2)		Report	Šćepović 22'; B. Szabó 38', 90+2' (pen.); Tamás 40'	Stadium: Wellis Sportpark; Attendance: 450; Referee: Bálint Dolnegó

29 November 2017 Round of 32	Vác	3–1	Videoton	Budapest
12:00 CET (UTC+1)	G. Tóth 27'; Króner (yellow card) 32'; Zsolnai 78'; R. Nagy 81'	Report	Fiola (yellow card) 22'; Šćepović (yellow card) 84', (goal) 90' (pen.); Géresi (yellow card) 87'; Négo (yellow card) 88'	Stadium: Hévízi úti Stadion; Attendance: 450; Referee: Gergő Bogár

=== UEFA Europa League ===
The First and Second Qualifying Round draws took place at UEFA headquarters in Nyon, Switzerland on 19 June 2017.

==== First qualifying round ====
29 June 2017 First leg	Videoton (Hungary)	2–0	(Malta) Balzan	Felcsút, Hungary
20:45 CEST (UTC+2)	Šćepović 79'; Lazović 90+4'	Report		Stadium: Pancho Aréna; Attendance: 2,188; Referee: Dejan Jakimovski (Macedonia)

4 July 2017 Second leg	Balzan (Malta)	3–3 (3–5 agg.)	(Hungary) Videoton	Paola, Malta
17:45 CEST (UTC+2)	Kaljević 3', 86' (pen.); Eggiong 56'	Report	Juhász 15'; Šćepović 79'; Géresi 80'	Stadium: Hibernians Stadium; Attendance: 550; Referee: Filip Glova (Slovakia)
Note: Videoton won 5–3 on aggregate.

==== Second qualifying round ====
13 July 2017 First leg	Nõmme Kalju (Estonia)	0–3	(Hungary) Videoton	Tallinn, Estonia
19:15 EEST (UTC+3)		Report	Pátkai 8'; Šćepović 47' (pen.), 74' (pen.)	Stadium: Kadriorg Stadium; Attendance: 760; Referee: João Capela, from 35'; Luís Godinho (Portugal)

20 July 2017 Second leg	Videoton (Hungary)	1–1 (4–1 agg.)	(Estonia) Nõmme Kalju	Felcsút, Hungary
21:00 CEST (UTC+2)	Lazović 37'	Report	Dmitrijev 50' (pen.)	Stadium: Pancho Aréna; Attendance: 2,612; Referee: Mario Zebec (Croatia)
Note: Videoton won 4–1 on aggregate.

==== Third qualifying round ====
27 July 2017 First leg	Bordeaux (France)	2–1	(Hungary) Videoton	Bordeaux, France
20:30 CEST (UTC+2)	Sankharé 18', 33'	Report	Šćepović 23'	Stadium: Nouveau Stade de Bordeaux; Attendance: 21,337; Referee: Bartosz Frankowski (Poland)

3 August 2017 Second leg	Videoton (Hungary)	1–0 ((a) 2–2 agg.)	(France) Bordeaux	Felcsút, Hungary
19:00 CEST (UTC+2)	Stopira 45+5'	Report		Stadium: Pancho Aréna; Attendance: 3,537; Referee: Christian Dingert (Germany)
Note: 2–2 on aggregate. Videoton won on away goals.

==== Play-off round ====
17 August 2017 First leg	Partizan (Serbia)	0–0	(Hungary) Videoton	Belgrade, Serbia
21:00 CEST (UTC+2)	Ostojić (yellow card) 3'; Radin (yellow card) 20'	Report	Pátkai (yellow card) 25'; Henty (yellow card) 46'; Fiola (yellow card) 52'; Szolnoki (yellow card) 56'	Stadium: Partizan Stadium; Attendance: 0 Referee: John Beaton (Scotland)

24 August 2017 Second leg	Videoton (Hungary)	0–4 (0–4 agg.)	(Serbia) Partizan	Felcsút, Hungary
20:00 CEST (UTC+2)	Juhász (yellow card) 44' (yellow-red card) 47'; Pátkai (yellow card) 55'; Fiola (yellow card) 85'	Report	Tawamba 6'; Soumah 24'; Ostojić (yellow card) 27'; Đurđević 35', 87'; Everton Luiz (yellow card) 81'	Stadium: Pancho Aréna; Attendance: 3,485; Referee: Andre Marriner (England)
Note: Partizan won 4–0 on aggregate.

== Statistics ==
=== Appearances and goals ===
No.	Pos	Nat	Player	Total		Nemzeti Bajnokság I		UEFA Europa League		Magyar Kupa	
No.	Pos	Nat	Player	Apps	Goals	Apps	Goals	Apps	Goals	Apps	Goals
1	GK	(Hungary) HUN	Tamás Horváth	3	0	0	0	0	0	3	0
3	DF	(Hungary) HUN	Paulo Vinícius	18	1	15	1	3	0	0	0
4	MF	(Hungary) HUN	Patrik Réti	2	0	2	0	0	0	0	0
5	DF	(Hungary) HUN	Attila Fiola	30	0	25	0	3	0	2	0
6	DF	(Hungary) HUN	András Fejes	15	2	11	1	3	0	1	1
7	FW	(Serbia) SRB	Danko Lazović	36	16	25	14	8	2	3	0
8	MF	(Bosnia and Herzegovina) BIH	Anel Hadžić	36	5	28	5	7	0	1	0
9	FW	(Croatia) CRO	Mirko Marić	10	0	4	0	6	0	0	0
9	FW	(Hungary) HUN	Szabolcs Huszti	9	1	9	1	0	0	0	0
10	MF	(Hungary) HUN	István Kovács	23	1	20	1	1	0	2	0
11	DF	(France) FRA	Loïc Nego	42	6	31	6	8	0	3	0
12	GK	(Slovakia) SVK	Tomáš Tujvel	1	0	1	0	0	0	0	0
14	FW	(Serbia) SRB	Stefan Šćepović	14	6	14	6	0	0	0	0
17	MF	(Hungary) HUN	Máté Pátkai	36	6	28	5	7	1	1	0
18	MF	(Hungary) HUN	Bence Szabó	12	4	6	0	4	0	2	4
19	MF	(North Macedonia) MKD	Boban Nikolov	13	3	13	3	0	0	0	0
20	DF	(Hungary) HUN	Attila Mocsi	3	0	1	0	0	0	2	0
21	FW	(Nigeria) NGR	Ezekiel Henty	20	5	15	5	4	0	1	0
21	MF	(Hungary) HUN	Bálint Szabó	1	0	1	0	0	0	0	0
22	DF	(Cape Verde) CPV	Stopira	39	2	31	1	8	1	0	0
23	DF	(Hungary) HUN	Roland Juhász	37	3	29	2	8	1	0	0
25	DF	(Hungary) HUN	Krisztián Tamás	11	3	7	1	1	0	3	2
27	MF	(Hungary) HUN	Ádám Bódi	1	0	0	0	1	0	0	0
30	DF	(Hungary) HUN	Roland Szolnoki	21	0	13	0	5	0	3	0
31	MF	(Hungary) HUN	Dávid Barczi	4	0	2	0	1	0	1	0
33	MF	(Hungary) HUN	József Varga	32	0	25	0	5	0	2	0
44	FW	(Serbia) SRB	Marko Šćepović	35	17	26	10	7	5	2	2
49	MF	(Hungary) HUN	Krisztián Géresi	22	2	13	1	6	1	3	0
51	GK	(Hungary) HUN	András Hársfalvi	1	0	0	0	0	0	1	0
55	DF	(Hungary) HUN	Bence Tóth	9	0	6	0	0	0	3	0
65	FW	(Hungary) HUN	Alexander Torvund	1	0	1	0	0	0	0	0
71	FW	(Bosnia and Herzegovina) BIH	Elvir Hadžić	3	0	3	0	0	0	0	0
74	GK	(Hungary) HUN	Ádám Kovácsik	40	0	32	0	8	0	0	0
77	DF	(Hungary) HUN	Bendegúz Bolla	2	0	1	0	0	0	1	0
99	MF	(Bosnia and Herzegovina) BIH	Asmir Suljić	25	1	16	1	7	0	2	0

=== Top scorers ===
Includes all competitive matches. The list is sorted by shirt number when total goals are equal.

Position	Nation	Number	Name	Nemzeti Bajnokság I	UEFA Europa League	Magyar Kupa	Total
1	(Serbia)	44	Marko Šćepović	10	5	2	17
2	(Serbia)	7	Danko Lazović	14	2	0	16
3	(France)	11	Loïc Négo	6	0	0	6
3	(Serbia)	14	Stefan Šćepović	6	0	0	6
3	(Hungary)	17	Máté Pátkai	5	1	0	6
6	(Bosnia and Herzegovina)	8	Anel Hadžić	5	0	0	5
6	(Nigeria)	21	Ezekiel Henty	5	0	0	5
8	(Hungary)	18	Bence Szabó	0	0	4	4
9	(North Macedonia)	19	Boban Nikolov	3	0	0	3
9	(Hungary)	23	Roland Juhász	2	1	0	3
9	(Hungary)	25	Krisztián Tamás	1	0	2	3
12	(Hungary)	6	András Fejes	1	0	1	2
12	(Cape Verde)	22	Stopira	1	1	0	2
12	(Hungary)	49	Krisztián Géresi	1	1	0	2
15	(Hungary)	3	Paulo Vinícius	1	0	0	1
15	(Hungary)	9	Szabolcs Huszti	1	0	0	1
15	(Hungary)	10	István Kovács	1	0	0	1
15	(Bosnia and Herzegovina)	99	Asmir Suljić	1	0	0	1
/	/	/	Own Goals	1	0	0	1
			TOTALS	65	11	9	85

=== Disciplinary record ===
Includes all competitive matches. Players with 1 card or more included only.

Position	Nation	Number	Name	Nemzeti Bajnokság I		UEFA Europa League		Magyar Kupa		Total (Hu Total)	
Position	Nation	Number	Name	Yellow card	Red card	Yellow card	Red card	Yellow card	Red card	Yellow card	Red card
DF	(Hungary)	3	Paulo Vinícius	4	0	1	0	0	0	5 (4)	0 (0)
DF	(Hungary)	5	Attila Fiola	10	0	3	0	1	0	14 (10)	0 (0)
DF	(Hungary)	6	András Fejes	5	0	2	0	0	0	7 (5)	0 (0)
FW	(Serbia)	7	Danko Lazović	10	2	1	0	0	0	11 (10)	2 (2)
MF	(Bosnia and Herzegovina)	8	Anel Hadžić	13	1	3	0	0	0	16 (13)	1 (1)
FW	(Croatia)	9	Mirko Marić	0	0	1	0	0	0	1 (0)	0 (0)
FW	(Hungary)	9	Szabolcs Huszti	4	0	0	0	0	0	4 (4)	0 (0)
MF	(Hungary)	10	István Kovács	4	0	0	0	0	0	4 (4)	0 (0)
DF	(France)	11	Loïc Nego	6	1	0	0	1	0	7 (6)	1 (1)
MF	(Hungary)	17	Máté Pátkai	14	0	3	0	0	0	17 (14)	0 (0)
MF	(Hungary)	18	Bence Szabó	1	0	0	0	0	0	1 (1)	0 (0)
MF	(North Macedonia)	19	Boban Nikolov	5	0	0	0	0	0	5 (5)	0 (0)
DF	(Hungary)	20	Attila Mocsi	0	0	0	0	1	0	1 (0)	0 (0)
FW	(Nigeria)	21	Ezekiel Henty	3	0	1	0	0	0	4 (3)	0 (0)
DF	(Cape Verde)	22	Stopira	4	0	2	0	0	0	6 (4)	0 (0)
DF	(Hungary)	23	Roland Juhász	10	0	2	1	0	0	12 (10)	1 (0)
DF	(Hungary)	25	Krisztián Tamás	1	0	0	0	0	0	1 (1)	0 (0)
DF	(Hungary)	30	Roland Szolnoki	1	0	3	0	0	0	4 (1)	0 (0)
MF	(Hungary)	31	Dávid Barczi	1	0	0	0	0	0	1 (1)	0 (0)
MF	(Hungary)	33	József Varga	1	0	0	1	0	0	1 (1)	1 (0)
FW	(Serbia)	44	Marko Šćepović	6	0	0	0	1	0	7 (6)	0 (0)
MF	(Hungary)	49	Krisztián Géresi	0	0	0	0	1	0	1 (0)	0 (0)
FW	(Bosnia and Herzegovina)	71	Elvir Hadžić	1	0	0	0	0	0	1 (1)	0 (0)
GK	(Hungary)	74	Ádám Kovácsik	1	0	0	0	0	0	1 (1)	0 (0)
DF	(Hungary)	77	Bendegúz Bolla	1	0	0	0	0	0	1 (1)	0 (0)
MF	(Bosnia and Herzegovina)	99	Asmir Suljić	3	1	3	0	0	0	6 (3)	1 (1)
			TOTALS	109	5	25	2	5	0	139 (109)	7 (5)
