= 2019–20 Fehérvár FC season =

Fehérvár FC
2019–20 season
- Chairman: István Garancsi
- Manager: (Serbia) Marko Nikolić (until 23 November 2019) (Portugal) Joan Carrillo
- Stadium: MOL Aréna Sóstó
- NB 1: 2nd
- Magyar Kupa: Semi-final
- UEFA Europa League: Second qualifying round
- Top goalscorer: League: Armin Hodžić (10); All: Armin Hodžić (15)
- Highest home attendance: 12,192 vs Ferencváros (27 October 2019)
- Lowest home attendance: 1,325 vs Kisvárda (6 June 2020)
Home colours	Away colours	Third colours

The 2019–20 season was MOL Vidi FC's 52nd competitive season, 21st consecutive season in the OTP Bank Liga and 79th year in existence as a football club.

== First team squad ==
As of 25 June 2019

Note: Flags indicate national team as defined under FIFA eligibility rules; some limited exceptions apply. Players may hold more than one non-FIFA nationality.

No.	Pos.	Nation	Player
1	GK	HUN	Dániel Kovács
3	DF	HUN	Paulo Vinícius (Vice-captain)
4	DF	ROU	Adrián Rus
5	DF	HUN	Attila Fiola
6	MF	HUN	Ákos Elek
7	MF	UKR	Ivan Petryak
8	MF	BIH	Anel Hadžić
9	MF	HUN	Szabolcs Huszti
10	MF	HUN	István Kovács
11	DF	FRA	Loïc Négo
12	GK	SVK	Tomáš Tujvel
15	FW	BIH	Armin Hodžić

No.	Pos.	Nation	Player
17	MF	HUN	Máté Pátkai
18	FW	HUN	Márkó Futács
19	MF	MKD	Boban Nikolov
22	DF	CPV	Stopira
23	DF	HUN	Roland Juhász (captain)
44	FW	SRB	Marko Šćepović
49	MF	HUN	Krisztián Géresi
65	DF	HUN	Szilveszter Hangya
70	FW	NGA	Funsho Bamgboye
74	GK	HUN	Ádám Kovácsik
77	MF	BUL	Georgi Milanov
TBD	DF	MKD	Visar Musliu

== Transfers ==
=== Summer ===
In: Note: Flags indicate national team as defined under FIFA eligibility rules; some limited exceptions apply. Players may hold more than one non-FIFA nationality.

No.	Pos.	Nation	Player
1	GK	HUN	Dániel Kovács (from Soroksár)
4	DF	ROU	Adrián Rus (from Puskás Akadémia)
7	MF	UKR	Ivan Petryak (from (Ukraine) Shakhtar Donetsk)
16	DF	MKD	Visar Musliu (from (North Macedonia) Shkendija)
35	DF	HUN	Bence Gundel-Takács (from Újpest)
55	MF	SRB	Danilo Pantić (loan from (England) Chelsea)
70	FW	NGA	Funsho Bamgboye (from Haladás)
99	FW	HUN	Dániel Zsóri (from Debrecen)
—	MF	HUN	Patrik Nyári (from Haladás)
—	DF	HUN	Bence Tóth (loan return from Vasas)
—	MF	HUN	Zsombor Bévárdi (loan return from Vasas)
—	DF	HUN	Bendegúz Bolla (loan return from Zalaegerszeg)
—	DF	HUN	Bence Szabó (loan return from Diósgyőr)
—	FW	HUN	Bence Sós (loan return from Puskás Akadémia)
—	MF	HUN	Patrik Réti (loan return from Siófok)

Out: Note: Flags indicate national team as defined under FIFA eligibility rules; some limited exceptions apply. Players may hold more than one non-FIFA nationality.

No.	Pos.	Nation	Player
2	DF	ESP	Joan Campins (to (Belgium) Mouscron)
4	DF	HUN	Krisztián Tamás (loan to Zalaegerszeg)
12	GK	SVK	Tomáš Tujvel (to Budapest Honvéd)
13	MF	HUN	Zsombor Berecz (loan to Mezőkövesd)
44	FW	SRB	Marko Šćepović (to (Turkey) Rizespor)
51	GK	HUN	András Hársfalvi (to Gyirmót)
71	FW	BIH	Elvir Hadžić (to (Austria) Dornbirn)
—	MF	HUN	Patrik Nyári (loan to Haladás)
—	FW	HUN	Bence Sós (to Puskás Akadémia)
—	MF	HUN	Patrik Réti (to Siófok)
—	DF	HUN	Bence Szabó (to Diósgyőr)
—	DF	HUN	Bence Tóth (to Vasas)
—	DF	HUN	Bendegúz Bolla (loan to Zalaegerszeg)
—	MF	HUN	Zsombor Bévárdi (loan to Debrecen)

=== Winter ===
In: Note: Flags indicate national team as defined under FIFA eligibility rules; some limited exceptions apply. Players may hold more than one non-FIFA nationality.

No.	Pos.	Nation	Player
24	MF	HUN	Patrik Nyári (loan return from Haladás)
27	FW	HUN	Levente Szabó (from Fehérvár U-19)
71	FW	HUN	Nemanja Nikolić (from (United States) Chicago Fire)
83	DF	HUN	Olivér Tamás (from Fehérvár U-19)
96	MF	FRA	Lyes Houri (from (Romania) Viitorul Constanța)

Out: Note: Flags indicate national team as defined under FIFA eligibility rules; some limited exceptions apply. Players may hold more than one non-FIFA nationality.

No.	Pos.	Nation	Player
55	MF	SRB	Danilo Pantić (loan return to (England) Chelsea)

== Competitions ==
=== Overview ===
Competition	First match	Last match	Starting round	Final position	Record							
Competition	First match	Last match	Starting round	Final position	Pld	W	D	L	GF	GA	GD	Win %
Nemzeti Bajnokság I	4 August 2019	–	Matchday 1	–	6	6	0	0	17	3	+14	100.00
Magyar Kupa	21 September 2019	–	Sixth round	–	1	1	0	0	4	2	+2	100.00
UEFA Europa League	11 July 2019	1 August 2019	First qualifying round	Second qualifying round	4	2	1	1	6	3	+3	50.00
Total					11	9	1	1	27	8	+19	81.82

Last updated: 23 September 2019
Source: Competitions

=== Nemzeti Bajnokság I ===
==== League table ====
Pos	Team	Pld	W	D	L	GF	GA	GD	Pts	Qualification or relegation
1	Ferencváros (C)	33	23	7	3	58	24	+34	76	Qualification for the Champions League first qualifying round
2	Fehérvár	33	18	9	6	56	29	+27	63	Qualification for the Europa League first qualifying round
3	Puskás Akadémia	33	14	12	7	52	41	+11	54	Qualification for the Europa League first qualifying round
4	Mezőkövesd	33	14	8	11	42	31	+11	50	
5	Honvéd	33	12	8	13	36	44	−8	44	Qualification for the Europa League first qualifying round (Note: Budapest Honvéd qualified for the Europa League first qualifying round by winning the 2019–20 Magyar Kupa.)

Source: Hungarian Football Federation (in Hungarian), Soccerway
Rules for classification: 1) Points; 2) Matches won; 3) Goal difference; 4) Goals scored; 5) Head-to-head points; 6) Head-to-head goal difference; 7) Head-to-head away goals scored; 8) Fair play ranking; 9) Drawing of lots.
(C) Champions

==== Results summary ====
Overall								Home						Away					
Pld	W	D	L	GF	GA	GD	Pts	W	D	L	GF	GA	GD	W	D	L	GF	GA	GD
33	18	9	6	56	29	+27	63	10	3	4	32	18	+14	8	6	2	24	11	+13

Last updated: 27 June 2020.
Source: NB1

==== Results by round ====
Round	1	2	3	4	5	6	7	8	9	10	11	12	13	14	15	16	17	18	19	20	21	22	23	24	25	26	27	28	29	30	31	32	33
Ground	H	A	H	A	H	A	H	H	A	H	A	A	H	A	H	A	H	A	A	H	A	H	H	A	H	A	H	A	H	H	A	H	A
Result	W	W	W	W	W	W	L	W	D	L	D	W	L	W	L	W	D	W	D	W	L	W	W	W	D	D	W	D	D	W	L	W	D
Position	1	1	1	1	1	1	1	1	1	2	2	2	3	2	2	2	2	2	2	2	2	2	2	2	2	2	2	2	2	2	2	2	2

Updated to match(es) played on 27 June 2020. Source: Matches
A = Away; H = Home; W = Win; D = Draw; L = Loss

==== Matches ====
4 August 2019 1	Fehérvár	4 – 2	Kaposvár	Székesfehérvár
18:00 CEST	Futács 5', 62'; Hodžić 16', 40'	Report	Ádám 8', 46'	Stadium: MOL Aréna Sóstó; Attendance: 2,881; Referee: Péter Solymosi

11 August 2019 2	Puskás Akadémia	0 – 2	Fehérvár	Felcsút
18:00 CEST		Report	Huszti 48' (pen.); Futács 80'	Stadium: Pancho Aréna; Attendance: 1,712; Referee: Viktor Kassai

17 August 2019 3	Fehérvár	5 – 1	Diósgyőr	Székesfehérvár
19:30 CEST	Elek 13'; Futács 53'; Juhász 73'; Hodžić 75', 85'	Report	Prosser 1'	Stadium: MOL Aréna Sóstó; Attendance: 3,586; Referee: Gergő Bogár

24 August 2019 4	Paks	0 – 2	Fehérvár	Paks
18:00 CEST		Report	Futács 24'; Petryak 61'	Stadium: Fehérvári úti Stadion; Attendance: 2,098; Referee: Bence Csonka

31 August 2019 5	Fehérvár	3 – 0	Kisvárda	Székesfehérvár
19:30 CEST	Musliu 41'; Milanov 56'; Hodžić 77'	Report		Stadium: MOL Aréna Sóstó; Attendance: 3,679; Referee: Balázs Berke

14 September 2019 6	Budapest Honvéd	0 – 1	Fehérvár	Budapest
17:00 CEST		Report	Hodžić 82'	Stadium: Hidegkuti Nándor Stadion; Attendance: 3,104; Referee: Viktor Kassai

28 September 2019 7	Fehérvár	0 – 2	Újpest	Székesfehérvár
19:30 CEST		Report	Onovo 81'; Feczesin 90+2'	Stadium: MOL Aréna Sóstó; Attendance: 5,267; Referee: Csaba Pintér

5 October 2019 8	Fehérvár	2 – 1	Debrecen	Székesfehérvár
19:30 CEST	Kovács 9'; Musliu 66'	Report	Adeniji 29'	Stadium: MOL Aréna Sóstó; Attendance: 3,301; Referee: Zoltán Iványi

19 October 2019 9	Mezőkövesd	0 – 0	Fehérvár	Mezőkövesd
17:00 CEST		Report		Stadium: Városi Stadion; Attendance: 2,642; Referee: Ádám Farkas

27 October 2019 10	Fehérvár	1 – 2	Ferencváros	Székesfehérvár
17:15 CET	Milanov 86'	Report	Sigér 24', 63'	Stadium: MOL Aréna Sóstó; Attendance: 12,192; Referee: Balázs Berke

2 November 2019 11	Zalaegerszeg	3 – 3	Fehérvár	Zalaegerszeg
17:00 CET	G. Bobál 6', 25'; Lesjak 90+3'	Report	Négo 51'; Hodžić 52'; Futács 83'	Stadium: ZTE Arena; Attendance: 4,038; Referee: Sándor Andó-Szabó

9 November 2019 12	Kaposvár	0 – 2	Fehérvár	Kaposvár
17:00 CET		Report	Milanov 3'; Futács 52'	Stadium: Rákóczi Stadion; Attendance: 1,575; Referee: Zoltán Iványi

23 November 2019 13	Fehérvár	1 – 3	Puskás Akadémia	Székesfehérvár
17:00 CET	Juhász 90'	Report	Vaněček 3'; Gyurcsó 27', 71'	Stadium: MOL Aréna Sóstó; Attendance: 3,365; Referee: Ferenc Karakó

30 November 2019 14	Diósgyőr	1 – 3	Fehérvár	Miskolc
19:30 CET	Bacsa 42'	Report	Stopira 6'; Kovács 46'; Nikolov 86'	Stadium: Diósgyőri Stadion; Attendance: 3,964; Referee: (Hungary) Balázs Berke

7 December 2019 15	Fehérvár	0 – 2	Paks	Székesfehérvár
17:00 CET		Report	Szabó 54'; Könyves 78'	Stadium: MOL Aréna Sóstó; Attendance: 2,019; Referee: József Erdős

14 December 2019 16	Kisvárda	0 – 2	Fehérvár	Kisvárda
17:00 CET		Report	Rubus 41' (o.g.); Pátkai 47'	Stadium: Várkerti Stadion; Attendance: 2,350; Referee: (Hungary) Balázs Berke

25 January 2020 17	Fehérvár	0 – 0	Budapest Honvéd	Székesfehérvár
17:00 CET		Report		Stadium: MOL Aréna Sóstó; Attendance: 3,054; Referee: Balázs Berke

1 February 2020 18	Újpest	0 – 1	Fehérvár	Budapest
19:30 CET		Report	Petryak 84'	Stadium: Szusza Ferenc Stadion; Attendance: 1,125; Referee: (Hungary) Csaba Pintér

5 February 2020 19	Debrecen	1 – 1	Fehérvár	Debrecen
18:00 CET	Bódi 81' (pen.)	Report	Hodžić 27'	Stadium: Nagyerdei Stadion; Attendance: 1,720; Referee: Gergő Bogár

8 February 2020 20	Fehérvár	2 – 1	Mezőkövesd	Székesfehérvár
17:00 CET	Hodžić 18'; Houri 37'	Report	Berecz 16'	Stadium: MOL Aréna Sóstó; Attendance: 2,716; Referee: Péter Solymosi

15 February 2020 21	Ferencváros	1 – 0	Fehérvár	Budapest
19:30 CET	Zubkov 51'	Report		Stadium: Groupama Arena; Attendance: 15,271; Referee: Balázs Berke

22 February 2020 22	Fehérvár	4 – 1	Zalaegerszeg	Székesfehérvár
17:00 CET	Stopira 5'; Petryak 49', 57', 61'	Report	Radó 85' (pen.)	Stadium: MOL Aréna Sóstó; Attendance: 2,395; Referee: Ádám Pillók

29 February 2020 23	Fehérvár	3 – 0	Kaposvár	Székesfehérvár
17:00 CET	Bamgboye 2'; T. Nagy 21' (o.g.); Nikolić 44'	Report		Stadium: MOL Aréna Sóstó; Attendance: 2,311; Referee: Ádám Farkas

7 March 2020 24	Puskás Akadémia	1 – 4	Fehérvár	Felcsút
17:00 CET	Slagveer 24'	Report	Bamgboye 50'; Petryak 59'; Nikolić 81'; Stopira 89'	Stadium: Pancho Aréna; Attendance: 2,015; Referee: Csaba Pintér

14 March 2020 25	Fehérvár	1 – 1	Diósgyőr	Székesfehérvár
19:30 CET	Négo 88'	Report	Tabaković 90'	Stadium: MOL Aréna Sóstó; Attendance: x Referee: Balázs Berke

30 May 2020 26	Paks	0 – 0	Fehérvár	Paks
21:05 CEST		Report		Stadium: Fehérvári úti Stadion; Attendance: 700; Referee: Gergő Bogár

6 June 2020 27	Fehérvár	2 – 0	Kisvárda	Székesfehérvár
19:00 CEST	Négo 16'; Nikolić 87'	Report		Stadium: MOL Aréna Sóstó; Attendance: 1,325; Referee: Sándor Andó-Szabó

9 June 2020 28	Budapest Honvéd	1 – 1	Fehérvár	Budapest
21:05 CEST	Ugrai 63'	Report	Nikolić 4'	Stadium: Hidegkuti Nándor Stadion; Attendance: 645; Referee: Bence Csonka

14 June 2020 29	Fehérvár	2 – 2	Újpest	Székesfehérvár
21:05 CEST	Ristevski 41' (o.g.); Nikolić 72'	Report	Nwobodo 64'; Heris 81'	Stadium: MOL Aréna Sóstó; Attendance: 645; Referee: Péter Solymosi

17 June 2020 30	Fehérvár	1 – 0	Debrecen	Székesfehérvár
19:00 CEST	Futács 83'	Report		Stadium: MOL Aréna Sóstó; Attendance: 1,812; Referee: István Vad

20 June 2020 31	Mezőkövesd	2 – 1	Fehérvár	Mezőkövesd
16:55 CEST	Beširović 35'; Meskhi 90+3'	Report	Futács 29'	Stadium: Városi Stadion; Attendance: 1,987; Referee: Ferenc Karakó

23 June 2020 32	Fehérvár	1 – 0	Ferencváros	Székesfehérvár
18:55 CEST	Juhász 45' (pen.)	Report		Stadium: MOL Aréna Sóstó; Attendance: 6,392; Referee: Balázs Berke

27 June 2020 33	Zalaegerszeg	1 – 1	Fehérvár	Zalaegerszeg
15:15 CEST	Babati 83'	Report	Hodžić 4'	Stadium: ZTE Arena; Attendance: 4,429; Referee: Mihály Káprály

=== Hungarian Cup ===
21 September 2019 6th round	Eger	2 – 4	Fehérvár	Eger
11:45 CEST	Pataki 43'; Árvai 81'	Report	Hodžić 47'; Futács 52'; Nikolov 78' 89'	Stadium: Szentmarjay Tibor Városi Stadion; Attendance: 1,000; Referee: János Takács

30 October 2019 7th round	Tiszaújváros	0 – 3	Fehérvár	Tiszaújváros
12:30 CET		Report	Hodžić 39'; Futács 75', 90' (pen.)	Stadium: Tiszaújváros Sportcentrum; Attendance: 800; Referee: Tamás Takács

3 December 2019 Round of 32	Szeged-Csanád	0 – 1 (a.e.t.)	Fehérvár	Szeged
20:00 CET		Report	Kárász 103' (o.g.)	Stadium: Szent Gellért Fórum; Attendance: 4,500; Referee: Bence Csonka

11 February 2020 Round of 16 (1st leg)	Újpest	0 – 0	Fehérvár	Szeged
19:30 CET		Report		Stadium: Szent Gellért Fórum; Attendance: 1,551; Referee: Ferenc Karakó

19 February 2020 Round of 16 (2nd leg)	Fehérvár	1 – 0 (1 – 0 agg.)	Újpest	Székesfehérvár
17:30 CET	Musliu 89'	Report		Stadium: MOL Aréna Sóstó; Attendance: 1,749; Referee: István Vad

4 March 2020 Quarter-final (1st leg)	Zalaegerszeg	2 – 0	Fehérvár	Zalaegerszeg
20:00 CET	Ikoba 83'; Hegedűs 87'	Report		Stadium: ZTE Arena; Attendance: 823; Referee: Bence Csonka

11 March 2020 Quarter-final (2nd leg)	Fehérvár	5 – 0 (5 – 2 agg.)	Zalaegerszeg	Székesfehérvár
17:30 CET	Hodžić 7', 61'; Bamgboye 26'; Houri 28'; Nikolić 89'	Report		Stadium: MOL Aréna Sóstó; Attendance: 1,731; Referee: Gergő Bogár

23 May 2020 Semi-final (1st leg)	Mezőkövesd	1 – 1	Fehérvár	Mezőkövesd
18:00 CEST	Pillár 80'	Report	Pátkai 12'	Stadium: Mezőkövesdi Városi Stadion; Attendance: no spectators Referee: Ádám Farkas

26 May 2020 Semi-final (2nd leg)	Fehérvár	2 – 2 (a) (3 – 3 agg.)	Mezőkövesd	Székesfehérvár
18:00 CEST	Hodžić 63'; Stopira 86'	Report	Zivzivadze 8'; Pekár 54'	Stadium: MOL Aréna Sóstó; Attendance: no spectators Referee: István Vad

=== UEFA Europa League ===
==== First qualifying round ====
11 July 2019 Q1 Leg 1	Zeta (Montenegro)	1 – 5	Fehérvár	Podgorica, Montenegro
20:30 CEST	Goranović 17'	Report	Négo 3', 12', 23'; Juhász 86'; Huszti 90+3'	Stadium: Podgorica City Stadium; Attendance: 965; Referee: (Georgia (country)) Georgi Vadachkoria

18 July 2019 Q1 Leg 2	Fehérvár	0 – 0 (5 – 1 agg.)	(Montenegro) Zeta	Felcsút
20:00 CEST		Report		Stadium: Pancho Aréna; Attendance: 2,148; Referee: (Republic of Ireland) Paul McLaughlin

==== Second qualifying round ====
25 July 2019 Q2 Leg 1	Fehérvár	1 – 0	(Liechtenstein) Vaduz	Felcsút
20:00 CEST	Stopira 5'	Report		Stadium: Pancho Aréna; Attendance: 2,224; Referee: (Norway) Kai Erik Steen

1 August 2019 Q2 Leg 2	Vaduz (Liechtenstein)	2 – 0 (a.e.t.) (2 – 1 agg.)	Fehérvár	Vaduz, Liechtenstein
19:00 CEST	Gajić 61' (pen.); Coulibaly 100'	Report		Stadium: Rheinpark Stadion; Attendance: 1,253; Referee: (Lithuania) Manfredas Lukjančukas

== Statistics ==
=== Appearances and goals ===
Last updated on 27 June 2020.

No.	Pos	Nat	Player	Total		OTP Bank Liga		Europa League		Hungarian Cup	
No.	Pos	Nat	Player	Apps	Goals	Apps	Goals	Apps	Goals	Apps	Goals
1	GK	(Hungary) HUN	Dániel Kovács	3	-1	1	-1	0	0	2	0
3	DF	(Hungary) HUN	Paulo Vinícius	12	0	10	0	0	0	2	0
4	DF	(Romania) ROU	Adrián Rus	14	0	11	0	0	0	3	0
5	DF	(Hungary) HUN	Attila Fiola	25	0	17	0	3	0	5	0
6	MF	(Hungary) HUN	Ákos Elek	33	1	23	1	4	0	6	0
7	MF	(Ukraine) UKR	Ivan Petryak	45	6	33	6	4	0	8	0
8	MF	(Bosnia and Herzegovina) BIH	Anel Hadžić	13	0	10	0	3	0	0	0
9	MF	(Hungary) HUN	Szabolcs Huszti	11	2	7	1	4	1	0	0
10	MF	(Hungary) HUN	István Kovács	37	2	30	2	2	0	5	0
11	DF	(France) FRA	Loïc Nego	37	6	26	3	4	3	7	0
15	FW	(Bosnia and Herzegovina) BIH	Armin Hodžić	36	15	27	10	2	0	7	5
16	DF	(North Macedonia) MKD	Visar Musliu	35	3	26	2	0	0	9	1
17	MF	(Hungary) HUN	Máté Pátkai	36	2	25	1	4	0	7	1
18	FW	(Hungary) HUN	Márkó Futács	37	12	24	9	4	0	9	3
19	MF	(North Macedonia) MKD	Boban Nikolov	29	3	22	1	3	0	4	2
22	DF	(Cape Verde) CPV	Stopira	32	5	21	3	4	1	7	1
23	DF	(Hungary) HUN	Roland Juhász	28	4	20	3	4	1	4	0
24	MF	(Hungary) HUN	Patrik Nyári	5	0	3	0	0	0	2	0
27	FW	(Hungary) HUN	Levente Szabó	4	0	3	0	0	0	1	0
65	DF	(Hungary) HUN	Szilveszter Hangya	26	0	21	0	0	0	5	0
70	FW	(Nigeria) NGA	Funsho Bamgboye	23	3	16	2	0	0	7	1
71	FW	(Hungary) HUN	Nemanja Nikolić	19	6	14	5	0	0	5	1
74	GK	(Hungary) HUN	Ádám Kovácsik	43	-38	32	-28	4	-3	7	-7
77	MF	(Bulgaria) BUL	Georgi Milanov	28	3	18	3	4	0	6	0
83	DF	(Hungary) HUN	Olivér Tamás	3	0	1	0	0	0	2	0
96	MF	(France) FRA	Lyes Houri	23	2	17	1	0	0	6	1
99	FW	(Hungary) HUN	Dániel Zsóri	7	0	5	0	0	0	2	0
Youth players:
20	DF	(Hungary) HUN	Attila Mocsi	0	0	0	0	0	0	0	0
35	GK	(Hungary) HUN	Bence Gundel-Takács	0	0	0	0	0	0	0	0
68	FW	(Hungary) HUN	Ádám Halmai	1	0	0	0	0	0	1	0
Players no longer at the club:
44	FW	(Serbia) SRB	Marko Šćepović	5	0	1	0	4	0	0	0
55	MF	(Serbia) SRB	Danilo Pantić	11	0	8	0	0	0	3	0

=== Top scorers ===
Includes all competitive matches. The list is sorted by shirt number when total goals are equal.

Last updated on 27 June 2020

Position	Nation	Number	Name	OTP Bank Liga	UEFA Europa League	Hungarian Cup	Total
1	(Bosnia and Herzegovina)	15	Armin Hodžić	10	0	5	15
2	(Hungary)	18	Márkó Futács	9	0	3	12
3	(France)	11	Loïc Négo	3	3	0	6
4	(Ukraine)	7	Ivan Petryak	6	0	0	6
5	(Hungary)	71	Nemanja Nikolić	5	0	1	6
6	(Cape Verde)	22	Stopira	3	1	1	5
7	(Hungary)	23	Roland Juhász	3	1	0	4
8	(Bulgaria)	77	Georgi Milanov	3	0	0	3
9	(North Macedonia)	16	Visar Musliu	2	0	1	3
10	(Nigeria)	70	Funsho Bamgboye	2	0	1	3
11	(North Macedonia)	19	Boban Nikolov	1	0	2	3
12	(Hungary)	9	Szabolcs Huszti	1	1	0	2
13	(Hungary)	10	István Kovács	2	0	0	2
14	(France)	96	Lyes Houri	1	0	1	2
15	(Hungary)	17	Máté Pátkai	1	0	1	2
16	(Hungary)	6	Ákos Elek	1	0	0	1
/	/	/	Own Goals	3	0	1	4
			TOTALS	56	6	17	79

=== Disciplinary record ===
Includes all competitive matches. Players with 1 card or more included only.

Last updated on 27 June 2020

Position	Nation	Number	Name	OTP Bank Liga		UEFA Europa League		Hungarian Cup		Total (Hu Total)	
Position	Nation	Number	Name	Booked	Sent off (straight red)	Booked	Sent off (straight red)	Booked	Sent off (straight red)	Booked	Sent off (straight red)
DF	(Hungary)	3	Paulo Vinícius	1	0	0	0	0	0	1 (1)	0 (0)
DF	(Romania)	4	Adrián Rus	2	0	0	0	0	0	2 (2)	0 (0)
DF	(Hungary)	5	Attila Fiola	3	0	1	0	1	0	5 (3)	0 (0)
MF	(Hungary)	6	Ákos Elek	2	1	0	0	1	0	3 (2)	1 (1)
MF	(Ukraine)	7	Ivan Petryak	4	0	0	0	2	0	6 (4)	0 (0)
MF	(Bosnia and Herzegovina)	8	Anel Hadžić	1	0	0	0	0	0	1 (1)	0 (0)
MF	(Hungary)	9	Szabolcs Huszti	3	0	0	0	0	0	3 (3)	0 (0)
MF	(Hungary)	10	István Kovács	4	0	0	0	0	0	4 (4)	0 (0)
MF	(France)	11	Loïc Négo	5	0	0	0	1	0	6 (5)	0 (0)
FW	(Bosnia and Herzegovina)	15	Armin Hodžić	5	0	1	0	1	0	7 (5)	0 (0)
DF	(North Macedonia)	16	Visar Musliu	4	0	0	0	1	0	5 (4)	0 (0)
MF	(Hungary)	17	Máté Pátkai	5	0	0	0	1	0	6 (5)	0 (0)
FW	(Hungary)	18	Márkó Futács	5	0	1	0	1	0	7 (5)	0 (0)
MF	(North Macedonia)	19	Boban Nikolov	5	0	2	0	1	0	8 (5)	0 (0)
DF	(Cape Verde)	22	Stopira	4	0	0	0	1	0	5 (4)	0 (0)
DF	(Hungary)	23	Roland Juhász	4	0	1	0	0	0	5 (4)	0 (0)
MF	(Hungary)	24	Patrik Nyári	1	0	0	0	1	0	2 (1)	0 (0)
MF	(Hungary)	27	Levente Szabó	1	0	0	0	0	0	1 (1)	0 (0)
MF	(Serbia)	55	Danilo Pantić	1	0	0	0	0	0	1 (1)	0 (0)
DF	(Hungary)	65	Szilveszter Hangya	4	0	0	0	1	0	5 (4)	0 (0)
FW	(Nigeria)	70	Funsho Bamgboye	2	1	0	0	1	0	3 (2)	1 (1)
FW	(Hungary)	71	Nemanja Nikolić	2	0	0	0	0	0	2 (2)	0 (0)
GK	(Hungary)	74	Ádám Kovácsik	0	0	1	0	0	0	1 (0)	0 (0)
MF	(Bulgaria)	77	Georgi Milanov	2	0	0	0	1	0	3 (2)	0 (0)
MF	(France)	96	Lyes Houri	2	0	0	0	1	0	3 (2)	0 (0)
MF	(Hungary)	99	Dániel Zsóri	1	0	0	0	0	0	1 (1)	0 (0)
			TOTALS	73	2	7	0	16	0	96 (73)	2 (2)

=== Overall ===
Games played	46 (33 OTP Bank Liga, 4 UEFA Europa League and 9 Hungarian Cup)
Games won	25 (18 OTP Bank Liga, 2 UEFA Europa League and 5 Hungarian Cup)
Games drawn	13 (9 OTP Bank Liga, 1 UEFA Europa League and 3 Hungarian Cup)
Games lost	8 (6 OTP Bank Liga, 1 UEFA Europa League and 1 Hungarian Cup)
Goals scored	79
Goals conceded	39
Goal difference	+40
Yellow cards	96
Red cards	2
Worst discipline	(North Macedonia) Boban Nikolov (8 (yellow card) , 0 (red card) )
Best result	5–0 (H) v Zalaegerszeg - Hungarian Cup - 11-3-2020
Worst result	0–2 (A) v Vaduz - UEFA Europa League - 1-8-2019
Worst result	0–2 (H) v Újpest - Nemzeti Bajnokság I - 28-9-2019
Worst result	1–3 (H) v Puskás Akadémia - Nemzeti Bajnokság I - 23-11-2019
Worst result	0–2 (H) v Paks - Nemzeti Bajnokság I - 7-12-2019
Worst result	0–2 (A) v Zalaegerszeg - Hungarian Cup - 4-3-2020
Most appearances	(Ukraine) Ivan Petryak (45 appearances)
Top scorer	(Bosnia and Herzegovina) Armin Hodžić (15 goals)
Points	88/136 (64.7%)

Last updated: 27 June 2020

=== Attendances ===
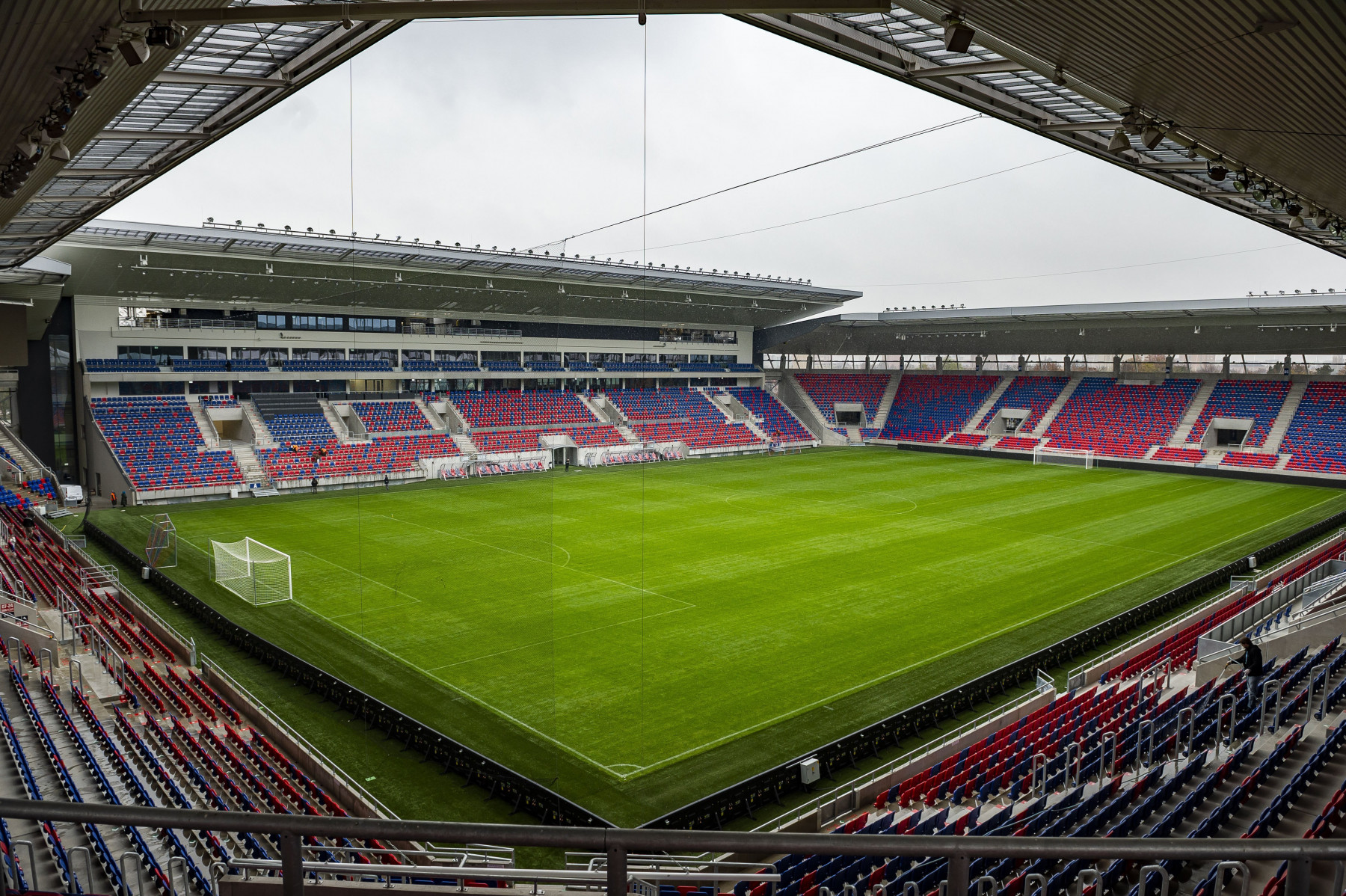
Home stadium: MOL Aréna Sóstó

List of the home matches:

Round	Against	Attadance	Date
EL-Q1	Kukësi (Montenegro)	2,148	18 July 2019
EL-Q2	Torino (Liechtenstein)	2,224	25 July 2019
NB I-1.	Kaposvár	2,881	4 August 2019
NB I-3.	Diósgyőr	3,586	17 August 2019
NB I-5.	Kisvárda	3,679	31 August 2019
NB I-7.	Újpest	5,267	28 September 2019
NB I-8.	Debrecen	3,301	5 October 2019
NB I-10.	Ferencváros	12,192	27 October 2019
NB I-13.	Puskás Akadémia	3,365	23 November 2019
NB I-15.	Paks	2,019	7 December 2019
NB I-17.	Budapest Honvéd	3,054	25 January 2020

As of 8 December 2019
