= 2018–19 Vidi FC season =

Vidi
2018–19 season
- Chairman: István Garancsi
- Manager: Marko Nikolić
- Nemzeti Bajnokság I: 2nd
- Magyar Kupa: Winners
- UEFA Champions League: Play-off round
- UEFA Europa League: Group stage
- Top goalscorer: League: Marko Šćepović (10); All: Marko Šćepović (14)
- Highest home attendance: 19,242 vs Chelsea (13 December 2018)
- Lowest home attendance: 1,095 vs Taksony (27 February 2019)
Home colours	Away colours	Third colours

The 2018–19 season was Vidi Football Club's 51st competitive season, 20th consecutive season in the OTP Bank Liga and 78th year in existence as a football club.

== First team squad ==
Note: Flags indicate national team as defined under FIFA eligibility rules; some limited exceptions apply. Players may hold more than one non-FIFA nationality.

No.	Pos.	Nation	Player
3	DF	HUN	Paulo Vinícius (Vice-captain)
5	DF	HUN	Attila Fiola
8	MF	BIH	Anel Hadžić
9	MF	HUN	Szabolcs Huszti
10	MF	HUN	István Kovács
11	DF	FRA	Loïc Nego
12	GK	SVK	Tomáš Tujvel
13	MF	HUN	Zsombor Berecz
14	FW	SRB	Stefan Šćepović
15	FW	BIH	Armin Hodžić
17	MF	HUN	Máté Pátkai
19	MF	MKD	Boban Nikolov
20	DF	HUN	Attila Mocsi

No.	Pos.	Nation	Player
21	MF	HUN	Bálint Szabó
22	DF	CPV	Stopira
23	DF	HUN	Roland Juhász (captain)
25	DF	HUN	Krisztián Tamás
44	FW	SRB	Marko Šćepović
49	MF	HUN	Krisztián Géresi
51	GK	HUN	András Hársfalvi
55	DF	HUN	Bence Tóth
65	DF	HUN	Szilveszter Hangya
70	MF	HUN	Bence Sós
71	FW	BIH	Elvir Hadžić
74	GK	HUN	Ádám Kovácsik
77	MF	BUL	Georgi Milanov

== Transfers ==
=== Summer ===
In: Note: Flags indicate national team as defined under FIFA eligibility rules; some limited exceptions apply. Players may hold more than one non-FIFA nationality.

No.	Pos.	Nation	Player
13	MF	HUN	Zsombor Berecz (from Vasas)
14	FW	HUN	Zsombor Bévárdi (loan return from Siófok)
15	FW	BIH	Armin Hodžić (from (Croatia) Dinamo Zagreb)
21	FW	NGA	Ezekiel Henty (loan return from Puskás Akadémia)
27	MF	HUN	Ádám Bódi (loan return from Debrecen)
65	DF	HUN	Szilveszter Hangya (from Vasas)
70	MF	HUN	Bence Sós (from Debrecen)
77	MF	BUL	Georgi Milanov (from (Russia) CSKA Moscow)
95	DF	HUN	Márton Lorentz (loan return from Siófok)
—	GK	HUN	Illés Zöldesi (loan return from Kisvárda)

Out: Note: Flags indicate national team as defined under FIFA eligibility rules; some limited exceptions apply. Players may hold more than one non-FIFA nationality.

No.	Pos.	Nation	Player
4	DF	HUN	Patrik Réti (loan to Siófok)
7	FW	SRB	Danko Lazović (Retired)
14	FW	HUN	Zsombor Bévárdi (loan to Vasas)
18	MF	HUN	Bence Szabó (loan to Diósgyőr)
21	FW	NGA	Ezekiel Henty (to Puskás Akadémia)
27	MF	HUN	Ádám Bódi (to Debrecen)
30	DF	HUN	Roland Szolnoki (to Puskás Akadémia)
33	MF	HUN	József Varga (to Puskás Akadémia)
77	DF	HUN	Bendegúz Bolla (loan to Siófok)
95	DF	HUN	Márton Lorentz (to Siófok)
99	MF	BIH	Asmir Suljić (to (Slovenia) Olimpija Ljubljana)
—	GK	HUN	Illés Zöldesi (loan to Zalaegerszeg)

=== Winter ===
In: Note: Flags indicate national team as defined under FIFA eligibility rules; some limited exceptions apply. Players may hold more than one non-FIFA nationality.

No.	Pos.	Nation	Player
2	DF	ESP	Joan Campins (from (Spain) Reus Deportiu)
6	MF	HUN	Ákos Elek (from (Kazakhstan) Kairat)
18	FW	HUN	Márkó Futács (from (Croatia) Hajduk Split)
77	DF	HUN	Bendegúz Bolla (loan return from Siófok)

Out: Note: Flags indicate national team as defined under FIFA eligibility rules; some limited exceptions apply. Players may hold more than one non-FIFA nationality.

No.	Pos.	Nation	Player
14	FW	SRB	Stefan Šćepović (to (Poland) Jagiellonia)
55	DF	HUN	Bence Tóth (loan to Vasas)
70	MF	HUN	Bence Sós (loan to Puskás Akadémia)
77	DF	HUN	Bendegúz Bolla (loan to Zalaegerszeg)

== Statistics ==
=== Appearances and goals ===
Last updated on 25 May 2019.

No.	Pos	Nat	Player	Total		OTP Bank Liga		CL/EL		Hungarian Cup	
No.	Pos	Nat	Player	Apps	Goals	Apps	Goals	Apps	Goals	Apps	Goals
3	DF	(Hungary) HUN	Paulo Vinícius	47	1	24	0	14	0	9	1
5	DF	(Hungary) HUN	Attila Fiola	36	0	19	0	14	0	3	0
6	MF	(Hungary) HUN	Ákos Elek	16	1	12	0	0	0	4	1
8	MF	(Bosnia and Herzegovina) BIH	Anel Hadžić	47	5	27	2	13	1	7	2
9	MF	(Hungary) HUN	Szabolcs Huszti	47	11	27	5	11	2	9	4
10	MF	(Hungary) HUN	István Kovács	55	4	32	4	14	0	9	0
11	DF	(France) FRA	Loïc Nego	57	9	33	5	14	3	10	1
12	GK	(Slovakia) SVK	Tomáš Tujvel	11	-10	4	-5	2	-3	5	-2
13	MF	(Hungary) HUN	Zsombor Berecz	15	0	9	0	1	0	5	0
15	FW	(Bosnia and Herzegovina) BIH	Armin Hodžić	40	6	26	4	6	0	8	2
17	MF	(Hungary) HUN	Máté Pátkai	52	5	32	5	12	0	8	0
18	FW	(Hungary) HUN	Márkó Futács	18	4	13	2	0	0	5	2
19	MF	(North Macedonia) MKD	Boban Nikolov	51	3	29	2	14	0	8	1
22	DF	(Cape Verde) CPV	Stopira	48	4	28	3	14	1	6	0
23	DF	(Hungary) HUN	Roland Juhász	50	5	30	4	13	0	7	1
25	DF	(Hungary) HUN	Krisztián Tamás	17	1	11	1	1	0	5	0
44	FW	(Serbia) SRB	Marko Šćepović	49	14	27	10	14	1	8	3
65	DF	(Hungary) HUN	Szilveszter Hangya	11	1	5	0	1	0	5	1
70	MF	(Hungary) HUN	Bence Sós	5	0	5	0	0	0	0	0
71	FW	(Bosnia and Herzegovina) BIH	Elvir Hadžić	2	0	1	0	0	0	1	0
74	GK	(Hungary) HUN	Ádám Kovácsik	47	-43	30	-32	12	-10	5	-1
77	MF	(Bulgaria) BUL	Georgi Milanov	37	4	24	1	6	1	7	2
Out to loan:
55	DF	(Hungary) HUN	Bence Tóth	2	0	0	0	0	0	2	0
Players no longer at the Club:
7	FW	(Serbia) SRB	Danko Lazović	13	3	6	1	7	2	0	0
14	FW	(Serbia) SRB	Stefan Šćepović	6	1	2	1	4	0	0	0
33	DF	(Hungary) HUN	József Varga	7	0	3	0	4	0	0	0

=== Top scorers ===
Includes all competitive matches. The list is sorted by shirt number when total goals are equal.

Last updated on 25 May 2019

Position	Nation	Number	Name	OTP Bank Liga	UEFA	Hungarian Cup	Total
1	(Serbia)	44	Marko Šćepović	10	1	3	14
2	(Hungary)	9	Szabolcs Huszti	5	2	4	11
3	(France)	11	Loïc Nego	5	3	1	9
4	(Bosnia and Herzegovina)	15	Armin Hodžić	4	0	2	6
5	(Hungary)	17	Máté Pátkai	5	0	0	5
6	(Bosnia and Herzegovina)	8	Anel Hadžić	2	1	2	5
7	(Hungary)	23	Roland Juhász	4	0	1	5
8	(Cape Verde)	22	Stopira	3	1	0	4
9	(Bulgaria)	77	Georgi Milanov	1	1	2	4
10	(Hungary)	10	István Kovács	4	0	0	4
11	(Hungary)	18	Márkó Futács	2	0	2	4
12	(Serbia)	7	Danko Lazović	1	2	0	3
13	(North Macedonia)	19	Boban Nikolov	2	0	1	3
14	(Serbia)	14	Stefan Šćepović	1	0	0	1
15	(Hungary)	25	Krisztián Tamás	1	0	0	1
16	(Hungary)	65	Szilveszter Hangya	0	0	1	1
17	(Hungary)	3	Paulo Vinícius	0	0	1	1
18	(Hungary)	6	Ákos Elek	0	0	1	1
/	/	/	Own Goals	3	1	0	4
			TOTALS	53	12	21	86

=== Disciplinary record ===
Includes all competitive matches. Players with 1 card or more included only.

Last updated on 25 May 2019

Position	Nation	Number	Name	OTP Bank Liga		UEFA		Hungarian Cup		Total (Hu Total)	
Position	Nation	Number	Name	Booked	Sent off (straight red)	Booked	Sent off (straight red)	Booked	Sent off (straight red)	Booked	Sent off (straight red)
DF	(Hungary)	3	Paulo Vinícius	10	0	3	0	4	0	17 (10)	0 (0)
DF	(Hungary)	5	Attila Fiola	7	0	5	0	0	0	12 (7)	0 (0)
MF	(Hungary)	6	Ákos Elek	1	0	0	0	2	0	3 (1)	0 (0)
FW	(Serbia)	7	Danko Lazović	1	0	2	0	0	0	3 (1)	0 (0)
MF	(Bosnia and Herzegovina)	8	Anel Hadžić	10	1	3	0	3	0	16 (10)	1 (1)
MF	(Hungary)	9	Szabolcs Huszti	5	0	6	1	2	0	13 (5)	1 (0)
MF	(Hungary)	10	István Kovács	10	0	2	0	3	0	15 (10)	0 (0)
DF	(France)	11	Loïc Nego	2	0	5	0	2	0	9 (2)	0 (0)
GK	(Slovakia)	12	Tomáš Tujvel	1	0	0	0	0	0	1 (1)	0 (0)
MF	(Hungary)	13	Zsombor Berecz	1	0	0	0	1	0	2 (1)	0 (0)
FW	(Bosnia and Herzegovina)	15	Armin Hodžić	4	0	1	0	0	0	5 (4)	0 (0)
MF	(Hungary)	17	Máté Pátkai	8	0	2	0	1	0	11 (8)	0 (0)
FW	(Hungary)	18	Márkó Futács	4	0	0	0	0	0	4 (4)	0 (0)
MF	(North Macedonia)	19	Boban Nikolov	4	0	4	0	3	0	11 (4)	0 (0)
DF	(Cape Verde)	22	Stopira	3	0	1	0	2	0	6 (3)	0 (0)
DF	(Hungary)	23	Roland Juhász	7	0	3	0	1	1	11 (7)	1 (0)
DF	(Hungary)	25	Krisztián Tamás	0	0	0	0	2	0	2 (0)	0 (0)
MF	(Hungary)	33	József Varga	0	0	1	0	0	0	1 (0)	0 (0)
FW	(Serbia)	44	Marko Šćepović	3	0	2	0	1	0	6 (3)	0 (0)
MF	(Hungary)	65	Szilveszter Hangya	0	0	0	0	1	0	1 (0)	0 (0)
MF	(Hungary)	70	Bence Sós	2	0	0	0	0	0	2 (2)	0 (0)
FW	(Bosnia and Herzegovina)	71	Elvir Hadžić	0	0	0	0	1	0	1 (0)	0 (0)
GK	(Hungary)	74	Ádám Kovácsik	1	0	1	0	1	0	3 (1)	0 (0)
MF	(Bulgaria)	77	Georgi Milanov	8	0	2	0	1	0	11 (8)	0 (0)
			TOTALS	91	1	44	1	31	1	166 (91)	3 (1)

=== Overall ===
Games played	57 (33 OTP Bank Liga, 14 CL/EL and 10 Hungarian Cup)
Games won	32 (18 OTP Bank Liga, 4 CL/EL and 10 Hungarian Cup)
Games drawn	13 (7 OTP Bank Liga, 6 CL/EL and 0 Hungarian Cup)
Games lost	12 (8 OTP Bank Liga, 4 CL/EL and 0 Hungarian Cup)
Goals scored	86
Goals conceded	53
Goal difference	+33
Yellow cards	166
Red cards	3
Worst discipline	(Bosnia and Herzegovina) Anel Hadžić (16 (yellow card) , 1 (red card) )
Best result	4–0 (H) v Kisvárda - Nemzeti Bajnokság I - 21-7-2018
Best result	4–0 (A) v Paks - Nemzeti Bajnokság I - 3-11-2018
Worst result	0–3 (H) v MTK Budapest - Nemzeti Bajnokság I - 7-10-2018
Worst result	0–3 (H) v Puskás Akadémia - Nemzeti Bajnokság I - 2-2-2019
Worst result	1–4 (A) v Ferencváros - Nemzeti Bajnokság I - 20-4-2019
Most appearances	(France) Loïc Nego (57 appearances)
Top scorer	(Serbia) Marko Šćepović (14 goals)
Points	107/171 (62.57%)

Last updated: 25 May 2019

== Nemzeti Bajnokság I ==
=== Matches ===
21 July 2018 1	Vidi	4 – 0	Kisvárda	Felcsút, Fejér County
20:15 CEST	Lazović 16'; M. Šćepović 36'; Juhász 44'; S. Šćepović 90+2'	Report		Stadium: Pancho Arena; Attendance: 1,744; Referee: (Hungary) Tamás Bognár

28 July 2018 2	Vidi	1 – 1	Paks	Felcsút, Fejér County
19:30 CEST	Á. Simon 28' (o.g.)	Report	A. Simon 22'	Stadium: Pancho Arena; Attendance: 1,058; Referee: (Hungary) Péter Solymosi

26 September 2018 3	Vidi	3 – 1	Mezőkövesd	Felcsút, Fejér County
20:00 CEST	Juhász 19'; Katanec 22' (o.g.); M. Šćepović 65'	Report	Vayda 90+4'	Stadium: Pancho Arena; Attendance: 696; Referee: (Hungary) Balázs Berke

10 August 2018 4	Vidi	1 – 1	Debrecen	Felcsút, Fejér County
20:00 CEST	Tamás 90+1'	Report	Varga 14'	Stadium: Pancho Arena; Attendance: 1,446; Referee: (Hungary) Viktor Kassai

18 August 2018 5	Budapest Honvéd	0 – 3	Vidi	Budapest, Pest County
19:30 CEST		Report	Kovács 26'; Huszti 39'; Hadžić 51'	Stadium: Hidegkuti Nándor Stadion; Attendance: 2,007; Referee: (Hungary) Ádám Farkas

21 November 2018 6	Vidi	1 – 0	Újpest	Székesfehérvár, Fejér County
19:00 CET	Juhász 58'	Report		Stadium: MOL Aréna Sóstó; Attendance: 11,251; Referee: (Hungary) Sándor Andó-Szabó

2 September 2018 7	Ferencváros	2 – 2	Vidi	Budapest, Pest County
18:00 CEST	Spirovski 14'; Lovrencsics 35'	Report	Nikolov 44'; Huszti 75'	Stadium: Groupama Arena; Attendance: 14,520; Referee: (Hungary) Balázs Berke

15 September 2018 8	Puskás Akadémia	2 – 1	Vidi	Felcsút, Fejér County
17:00 CEST	Knežević 39'; Jesús 85'	Report	M. Šćepović 24'	Stadium: Pancho Arena; Attendance: 1,728; Referee: (Hungary) Gergely Szőts

30 September 2018 9	Diósgyőr	0 – 1	Vidi	Miskolc, Borsod-Abaúj-Zemplén County
18:00 CEST		Report	Huszti 69'	Stadium: Diósgyőri Stadion; Attendance: 2,850; Referee: (Hungary) Csaba Pintér

7 October 2018 10	Vidi	0 – 3	MTK Budapest	Felcsút, Fejér County
18:00 CEST		Report	Gera 22'; Kanta 36'; Bognár 71'	Stadium: Pancho Arena; Attendance: 1,220; Referee: (Hungary) Viktor Kassai

20 October 2018 11	Szombathelyi Haladás	0 – 2	Vidi	Szombathely, Vas County
17:00 CEST		Report	M. Šćepović 61'; Pátkai 69'	Stadium: Haladás Sportkomplexum; Attendance: 3,317; Referee: (Hungary) Balázs Berke

28 October 2018 12	Kisvárda	2 – 2	Vidi	Kisvárda, Szabolcs-Szatmár-Bereg County
17:00 CEST	Sassá 26'; Stopira 74' (o.g.)	(Report)	Nego 19' (pen.); Pátkai 39'	Stadium: Várkert Sportpálya; Attendance: 2,232; Referee: (Hungary) István Vad

3 November 2018 13	Paks	0 – 4	Vidi	Paks, Tolna County
17:00 CET		(Report)	Pátkai 18', 56'; Nego 27'; Hodžić 34'	Stadium: Fehérvári úti Stadion; Attendance: 1,269; Referee: (Hungary) Viktor Kassai

11 November 2018 14	Mezőkövesd	1 – 0	Vidi	Mezőkövesd, Borsod-Abaúj-Zemplén County
15:30 CET	Koszta 67'	Report		Stadium: Mezőkövesdi Városi Stadion; Attendance: 2,456; Referee: (Hungary) Péter Solymosi

25 November 2018 15	Debrecen	0 – 1	Vidi	Debrecen, Hajdú-Bihar County
17:00 CET		Report	Nego 40'	Stadium: Nagyerdei Stadion; Attendance: 2,922; Referee: (Hungary) Zoltán Iványi

2 December 2018 16	Vidi	2 – 0	Budapest Honvéd	Székesfehérvár, Fejér County
18:00 CET	Juhász 18'; Šćepović 63'	Report		Stadium: MOL Aréna Sóstó; Attendance: 4,699; Referee: (Hungary) Viktor Kassai

8 December 2018 17	Újpest	2 – 0	Vidi	Budapest, Pest County
19:30 CET	Novothny 26'; Nwobodo 33'	Report		Stadium: Szusza Ferenc Stadion; Attendance: 1,675; Referee: (Hungary) Ádám Farkas

16 December 2018 18	Vidi	2 – 1	Ferencváros	Székesfehérvár, Fejér County
20:15 CET	Hodžić 30'; Šćepović 67'	Report	Petryak 37'	Stadium: MOL Aréna Sóstó; Attendance: 6,442; Referee: (Hungary) József Erdős

2 February 2019 19	Vidi	0 – 3	Puskás Akadémia	Székesfehérvár, Fejér County
17:00 CET		Report	Urblík 7'; Radó 72'; Arabuli 88'	Stadium: MOL Aréna Sóstó; Attendance: 2,980; Referee: (Hungary) Viktor Kassai

9 February 2019 20	Vidi	1 – 2	Diósgyőr	Székesfehérvár, Fejér County
17:00 CET	Šćepović 4'	Report	Mihajlović 28'; Karan 33'	Stadium: MOL Aréna Sóstó; Attendance: 2,540; Referee: (Hungary) Csaba Pintér

16 February 2019 21	MTK Budapest	1 – 3	Vidi	Budapest, Pest County
19:30 CET	Torghelle 62'	Report	Hadžić 9'; Šćepović 11'; Stopira 36'	Stadium: Hidegkuti Nándor Stadion; Attendance: 2,105; Referee: (Hungary) Viktor Kassai

23 February 2019 22	Vidi	1 – 0	Szombathelyi Haladás	Székesfehérvár, Fejér County
17:00 CET	Kovács 78'	Report		Stadium: MOL Aréna Sóstó; Attendance: 2,043; Referee: (Hungary) Ferenc Karakó

2 March 2019 23	Vidi	2 – 1	Kisvárda	Székesfehérvár, Fejér County
17:00 CET	Kovács 59'; Hodžić 70'	Report	Ilić 32'	Stadium: MOL Aréna Sóstó; Attendance: 1,975; Referee: (Hungary) Balázs Berke

9 March 2019 24	Paks	2 – 2	Vidi	Paks, Tolna County
17:00 CET	Hahn 22'; Könyves 43'	Report	Stopira 35'; Šćepović 55'	Stadium: Fehérvári úti Stadion; Attendance: 1,400; Referee: (Hungary) István Vad

16 March 2019 25	Vidi	1 – 0	Mezőkövesd	Székesfehérvár, Fejér County
17:00 CET	Futács 35'	Report		Stadium: MOL Aréna Sóstó; Attendance: 2,340; Referee: (Hungary) Zoltán Iványi

30 March 2019 26	Vidi	2 – 1	Debrecen	Székesfehérvár, Fejér County
19:30 CEST	Šćepović 77'; Pátkai 84'	Report	Tőzsér 54'	Stadium: MOL Aréna Sóstó; Attendance: 3,431; Referee: (Hungary) Csaba Pintér

6 April 2019 27	Budapest Honvéd	0 – 1	Vidi	Budapest, Pest County
19:30 CEST		Report	Huszti 89'	Stadium: Hidegkuti Nándor Stadion; Attendance: 2,187; Referee: (Hungary) István Vad

13 April 2019 28	Vidi	2 – 1	Újpest	Székesfehérvár, Fejér County
19:30 CEST	Hodžić 17'; Futács 71'	Report	Zsótér 64'	Stadium: MOL Aréna Sóstó; Attendance: 4,457; Referee: (Hungary) Zoltán Iványi

20 April 2019 29	Ferencváros	4 – 1	Vidi	Budapest, Pest County
19:30 CEST	Nguen 7'; Kharatin 58'; Lanzafame 68', 90+2'	Report	Négo 22'	Stadium: Groupama Arena; Attendance: 16,127; Referee: (Hungary) Balázs Berke

27 April 2019 30	Vidi	1 – 1	Puskás Akadémia	Székesfehérvár, Fejér County
17:00 CEST	Milanov 54' (pen.)	Report	Juhász 84' (o.g.)	Stadium: MOL Aréna Sóstó; Attendance: 2,585; Referee: (Hungary) Viktor Kassai

4 May 2019 31	Diósgyőr	2 – 1	Vidi	Miskolc, Borsod-Abaúj-Zemplén County
17:00 CEST	Hasani 5'; Márkvárt 73'	Report	Stopira 50'	Stadium: Diósgyőri Stadion; Attendance: 3,262; Referee: (Hungary) István Vad

11 May 2019 32	Vidi	4 – 2	MTK Budapest	Székesfehérvár, Fejér County
17:00 CEST	Huszti 32' (pen.); Nikolov 64'; Nego 87'; Kovács 90+1'	Report	Diallo 24'; Kulcsár 89'	Stadium: MOL Aréna Sóstó; Attendance: 3,113; Referee: (Hungary) Gergő Bogár

19 May 2019 33	Szombathelyi Haladás	1 – 1	Vidi	Szombathely, Vas County
17:00 CEST	Priskin 67'	Report	Németh 80' (o.g.)	Stadium: Haladás Sportkomplexum; Attendance: 3,340; Referee: (Hungary) Ádám Pillók

=== League table ===
Pos	Team	Pld	W	D	L	GF	GA	GD	Pts	Qualification or relegation
1	Ferencváros (C)	33	23	5	5	72	27	+45	74	Qualification for the Champions League first qualifying round
2	Vidi	33	18	7	8	53	37	+16	61	Qualification for the Europa League first qualifying round (Note: Since the winners of the 2018–19 Magyar Kupa, Vidi, qualified for European competition based on league position, the spot awarded to the cup winners (Europa League first qualifying round) was passed to the fourth-placed team.)
3	Debrecen	33	14	9	10	44	39	+5	51	Qualification for the Europa League first qualifying round
4	Honvéd	33	13	10	10	46	38	+8	49	Qualification for the Europa League first qualifying round
5	Újpest	33	12	12	9	38	28	+10	48	

Source: Hungarian Football Federation (in Hungarian), Soccerway
Rules for classification: 1) Points; 2) Matches won; 3) Goal difference; 4) Goals scored; 5) Head-to-head points; 6) Head-to-head goal difference; 7) Head-to-head away goals scored; 8) Fair play ranking; 9) Drawing of lots.
(C) Champions

=== Results summary ===
Overall								Home						Away					
Pld	W	D	L	GF	GA	GD	Pts	W	D	L	GF	GA	GD	W	D	L	GF	GA	GD
33	18	7	8	53	37	+16	61	11	3	3	28	18	+10	7	4	5	25	19	+6

Last updated: 19 May 2019.
Source: NB1

=== Results by round ===
Round	1	2	3	4	5	6	7	8	9	10	11	12	13	14	15	16	17	18	19	20	21	22	23	24	25	26	27	28	29	30	31	32	33
Ground	H	H	H	H	A	H	A	A	A	H	A	A	A	A	A	H	A	H	H	H	A	H	H	A	H	H	A	H	A	H	A	H	A
Result	W	D	W	D	W	W	D	L	W	L	W	D	W	L	W	W	L	W	L	L	W	W	W	D	W	W	W	W	L	D	L	W	D
Position	1	3	3	4	3	3	3	3	2	3	2	3	3	3	2	2	2	2	2	2	2	2	2	2	2	2	2	2	2	2	2	2	2

Updated to match(es) played on 19 May 2019. Source: Matches
A = Away; H = Home; W = Win; D = Draw; L = Loss

== Hungarian Cup ==
23 September 2018 Round 6	Cigánd	0 – 2	Vidi	Cigánd, Borsod-Abaúj-Zemplén County
13:00 CEST		Report	Huszti 30' (pen.); Milanov 34'	Stadium: Városi Stadion; Attendance: 900; Referee: (Hungary) Norbert Nagy

31 October 2018 Round 7	Vác	1 – 3	Vidi	Vác, Pest County
18:00 CET	Zsolnai 9'	Report	Hangya 8'; Hodžić 30'; Šćepović 58'	Stadium: Szusza Ferenc Stadion; Attendance: 450; Referee: (Hungary) Ádám Pillók

5 December 2018 Round of 32	Budafok	1 – 2	Vidi	Budafok, Pest County
15:00 CET	Oláh 43'	Report	Nego 6'; Šćepović 79'	Stadium: Budafoki Sporttelep; Attendance: 400; Referee: (Hungary) Balázs Böcskei

20 February 2019 Round of 16 (leg 1)	Taksony	0 – 1	Vidi	Dunaharaszti, Pest County
14:00 CET		Report	Hodžić 78'	Stadium: Dunaharaszti MTK Sporttelep; Attendance: 1,200; Referee: (Hungary) Bence Csonka

27 February 2019 Round of 16 (leg 2)	Vidi	3 – 0 (4 – 0 agg.)	Taksony	Székesfehérvár, Fejér County
18:00 CET	Huszti 26', 42'; Hadžić 32'	Report		Stadium: MOL Aréna Sóstó; Attendance: 1,095; Referee: (Hungary) Gábor Barna

13 March 2019 Quarter-final (leg 1)	Ferencváros	1 – 2	Vidi	Budapest, Pest County
18:00 CET	Gorriarán 27'	Report	Juhász 6'; Vinícius 58'	Stadium: Groupama Arena; Attendance: 7,567; Referee: (Hungary) Péter Solymosi

3 April 2019 Quarter-final (leg 2)	Vidi	2 – 0 (4 – 1 agg.)	Ferencváros	Székesfehérvár, Fejér County
18:00 CEST	Nikolov 58'; Milanov 82'	Report		Stadium: MOL Aréna Sóstó; Attendance: 6,202; Referee: (Hungary) Viktor Kassai

16 April 2019 Semi-final (leg 1)	Vidi	1 – 0	Debrecen	Székesfehérvár, Fejér County
18:00 CEST	Futács 3'	Report		Stadium: MOL Aréna Sóstó; Attendance: 2,976; Referee: (Hungary) Ádám Farkas

23 April 2019 Semi-final (leg 2)	Debrecen	0 – 3 (0 – 4 agg.)	Vidi	Debrecen, Hajdú-Bihar County
20:00 CET		Report	Futács 66'; Elek 72'; Huszti 90+2' (pen.)	Stadium: Nagyerdei Stadion; Attendance: 3,400; Referee: (Hungary) Zoltán Iványi

25 May 2019 Final	Budapest Honvéd	1 – 2	Vidi	Budapest, Pest County
19:30 CEST	Holender 14' (pen.)	Report	Šćepović 79'; Hadžić 90+1'	Stadium: Groupama Aréna; Attendance: 12,777; Referee: (Hungary) Zoltán Iványi

== UEFA Champions League ==
10 July 2018 Q1 Leg 1	Dudelange (Luxembourg)	1 – 1	Vidi	Dudelange
18:00 CEST	Mélisse 58'	Report	Huszti 42'	Stadium: Stade Jos Nosbaum; Attendance: 1,057; Referee: (Armenia) Zaven Hovhannisyan

17 July 2018 Q1 Leg 2	Vidi	2 – 1 (3 – 2 agg.)	(Luxembourg) Dudelange	Felcsút
20:15 CEST	Lazović 18'; M. Šćepović 58'	Report	Couturier 54'	Stadium: Pancho Arena; Attendance: 2,514; Referee: (Scotland) Donald Robertson

25 July 2018 Q2 Leg 1	Ludogorets Razgrad (Bulgaria)	0 – 0	Vidi	Razgrad
19:00 CEST		Report		Stadium: Ludogorets Arena; Attendance: 5,327; Referee: (Sweden) Bojan Pandžić

1 August 2018 Q2 Leg 2	Vidi	1 – 0 (1 – 0 agg.)	(Bulgaria) Ludogorets Razgrad	Felcsút
20:00 CEST	Hadžić 45'	Report		Stadium: Pancho Arena; Attendance: 2,878; Referee: (Austria) Manuel Schüttengruber

7 August 2018 Q3 Leg 1	Malmö (Sweden)	1 – 1	Vidi	Malmö
19:15 CEST	Christiansen 62'	Report	Nego 71'	Stadium: Stadion (Malmö); Attendance: 17,209; Referee: (Slovenia) Matej Jug

14 August 2018 Q3 Leg 2	Vidi	0 – 0 ((a) 1 – 1 agg.)	(Sweden) Malmö	Felcsút
20:00 CEST		Report		Stadium: Pancho Arena; Attendance: 3,432; Referee: (Spain) Xavier Estrada Fernández

22 August 2018 PO Leg 1	Vidi	1 – 2	(Greece) AEK Athens	Budapest
21:00 CEST	Lazović 67'	Report	Klonaridis 34'; Bakasetas 49'	Stadium: Groupama Arena; Attendance: 10,681; Referee: (Italy) Gianluca Rocchi

28 August 2018 PO Leg 2	AEK Athens (Greece)	1 – 1 (3 – 2 agg.)	Vidi	Athens
21:00 CEST	Mantalos 48' (pen.)	Report	Nego 57'	Stadium: Olympic Stadium (Athens); Attendance: 29,774; Referee: (Poland) Szymon Marciniak

== UEFA Europa League ==
=== Group stage ===
Pos	Team	Pld	W	D	L	GF	GA	GD	Pts	Qualification	CHL	BATE	VID	PAOK
1	(England) Chelsea	6	5	1	0	12	3	+9	16	Advance to knockout phase	—	3–1	1–0	4–0
2	(Belarus) BATE Borisov	6	3	0	3	9	9	0	9	Advance to knockout phase	0–1	—	2–0	1–4
3	(Hungary) Vidi	6	2	1	3	5	7	−2	7		2–2	0–2	—	1–0
4	(Greece) PAOK	6	1	0	5	5	12	−7	3		0–1	1–3	0–2	—

Source: UEFA
Rules for classification: Group stage tiebreakers

20 September 2018 1	Vidi	0 – 2	(Belarus) BATE Borisov	Budapest
18:55 CEST		Report	Tuominen 27'; Filipenko 85'	Stadium: Groupama Arena; Attendance: 14,727; Referee: (Denmark) Mads-Kristoffer Kristoffersen

4 October 2018 2	Chelsea (England)	1 – 0	Vidi	London
21:00 CEST	Morata 70'	Report		Stadium: Stamford Bridge (stadium); Attendance: 39,925; Referee: (Czech Republic) Miroslav Zelinka

25 October 2018 3	PAOK (Greece)	0 – 2	Vidi	Thessaloniki
21:00 CEST		Report	Huszti 12'; Stopira 45'	Stadium: Toumba Stadium; Attendance: 15,118; Referee: (Ukraine) Yevhen Aranovskyi

8 November 2018 4	Vidi	1 – 0	(Greece) PAOK	Budapest
18:55 CET	Milanov 50'	Report		Stadium: Groupama Arena; Attendance: 17,208; Referee: (Turkey) Ali Palabıyık

29 November 2018 5	BATE Borisov (Belarus)	2 – 0	Vidi	Barysaw
18:55 CET	Signevich 22'; Ivanić 85'	Report		Stadium: Borisov Arena; Attendance: 8,963; Referee: (Spain) Carlos del Cerro Grande

13 December 2018 4	Vidi	2 – 2	(England) Chelsea	Budapest
18:55 CET	Ampadu 32' (o.g.); Nego 56'	Report	Willian 30'; Giroud 75'	Stadium: Groupama Arena; Attendance: 19,242; Referee: (North Macedonia) Aleksandar Stavrev
