= Marko Šćepović =

Serbian footballer (born 1991)

Personal information
- Full name: Marko Šćepović
- Date of birth: 23 May 1991 (age 35)
- Place of birth: Belgrade, SFR Yugoslavia
- Height: 1.91 m (6 ft 3 in)
- Position: Striker

Team information
- Current team: Teleoptik
- Number: 29

Youth career
- Mérida
- Rad
- 2002–2008: Partizan

Senior career*
Years	Team	Apps	(Gls)
2008–2010	Teleoptik	36	(11)
2010–2013	Partizan	45	(16)
2013–2016	Olympiacos	13	(4)
2014–2015	→ Mallorca (loan)	15	(6)
2015	→ Terek Grozny (loan)	1	(0)
2015–2016	→ Mouscron-Péruwelz (loan)	24	(6)
2016–2019	Videoton	78	(33)
2019–2020	Çaykur Rizespor	10	(0)
2020	Buriram United	9	(5)
2021–2022	Omonia	41	(15)
2023	Lugo	7	(0)
2023–2024	Novi Pazar	22	(1)
2025–	Teleoptik	1	(1)

International career^{‡}
2009–2010	Serbia U19	4	(4)
2011–2012	Serbia U21	7	(1)
2012–2013	Serbia	5	(0)
- * Club domestic league appearances and goals as of 23 August 2025 ‡ National team caps and goals as of 15 October 2017

Marko Šćepović (Serbian Cyrillic: Марко Шћеповић, pronounced [mâːrko ʃtɕêpoʋitɕ]; born 23 May 1991) is a Serbian professional footballer who plays as a striker for Teleoptik.

== Club career ==
=== Early career ===
Born in Belgrade, Šćepović graduated from FK Partizan's youth setup, after stints at Spanish CP Mérida and FK Rad. He made his debuts as a senior with FK Teleoptik, the former's farm team, scoring regularly in his second campaign.

=== Partizan ===
In the summer of 2010 Šćepović was promoted to the main squad, and signed his first professional contract. In his first season under Aleksandar Stanojević, he split appearances with fellow forwards, Lamine Diarra, Eduardo Pacheco, and Lazar Marković.

Šćepović scored his first professional goal on 4 September 2010, netting the last of a 2–0 home success against FK Hajduk Kula. On 29 October of the following year, after netting the second in a 3–1 win against FK Smederevo, he gestured with his finger on his lips to "hush" some spectators in the east tribune of Partizan Stadium which had provoked him during the match. He also scored in Partizan's 2–0 win in the Eternal Derby against Red Star Belgrade on 26 November, being also given the Man of the Match award by Serbian newspaper Sportal.

==== Armband affair ====
On 6 August 2013, after captaining Partizan in a 0–1 UEFA Champions League home loss to Ludogorets Razgrad (1-3 aggregate loss), a Grobari leader named Miloš "Kimi" Radisavljević jumped down onto the pitch and removed the armband of Šćepović's arm. On 7 August, the scandal became even more controversial when a media conference was held with Radisavljević and Šćepović, with the former claiming to the press that he did not "aggressively" take the armband, and that he and the latter were "friends".

In spite of the bizarre media conference and Šćepović passively agreeing with Radisavljević in the conference, criminologist Zlatko Nikolić of Serbia's Criminal and Social Research Institute gave voice to a widespread public suspicion that the conference was staged and that Šćepović was humiliated and may have been threatened to agree with the latter in the conference. Despite the Serbian Ministry of Internal Affairs promising to investigate the matter thoroughly, Radisavljević was released after a 90-minute interrogation by the police. About the incident, Milutin Šoškić said, "We have imported hooliganism from England, but we don't have a Margaret Thatcher to neutralize it."

=== Olympiacos ===
On 2 September 2013, Šćepović signed a four-year deal with Olympiacos, for a €3.5 million fee. On 22 February 2014, he scored his first hat-trick in his career, in a 4–0 away win against OFI.

Despite scoring four goals for the Greek outfit, Šćepović only started in seven matches during the whole campaign, totalling 650 minutes of action.

==== Mallorca (loan) ====
On 20 August 2014, Šćepović was loaned to Spanish Segunda División side RCD Mallorca in a season-long deal. An undisputed starter during the beginning of the campaign, he scored braces against CA Osasuna and CD Lugo.

==== Terek Grozny (loan) ====
On 25 February 2015, Šćepović joined FC Terek Grozny on loan for the remainder of the 2014–15 season.

==== Royal Mouscron-Péruwelz (loan) ====
In August 2015 Šćepović joined Royal Mouscron-Péruwelz on loan from Olympiakos.

=== Fehérvár ===
On 30 August 2016, Šćepović signed a three-year contract with Videoton, later named MOL Vidi.

=== Later career ===
On 30 August 2019, Šćepović signed a three-year contract with Turkish Süper Lig club Çaykur Rizespor. He subsequently played for Thai club Buriram United in 2020, and for Cypriot side Omonia during the 2021–22 season.

On 6 February 2023, after more than six months without a club, Šćepović signed a short-term deal with Lugo in the Spanish second division.

== International career ==
On 12 October 2012, Šćepović made his debut for the Serbia national team in a FIFA World Cup qualifier against Belgium. Šćepović started the game against Croatia in a FIFA World Cup qualifier.

== Personal life ==
Šćepović is the son of former Partizan striker Slađan Šćepović, and the younger brother of another professional football striker, Stefan Šćepović.

== Career statistics ==
=== Club ===
As of 30 May 2022

Club	Season	League			National Cup		Continental		Other		Total	
Club	Season	Division	Apps	Goals	Apps	Goals	Apps	Goals	Apps	Goals	Apps	Goals
Teleoptik	2009–10	Serbian First League	26	11	0	0	—		—		26	11
Partizan	2010–11	Serbian SuperLiga	19	6	3	4	4	0	—		26	10
Partizan	2011–12	Serbian SuperLiga	9	4	2	0	4	1	—		15	5
Partizan	2012–13	Serbian SuperLiga	17	6	2	0	4	0	—		23	6
Partizan	2013–14	Serbian SuperLiga	0	0	—		4	0	—		4	0
Partizan	Total		45	16	7	4	16	1	—		68	21
Olympiacos	2013–14	Super League Greece	13	4	4	3	—		—		17	7
Mallorca (loan)	2014–15	Segunda División	15	6	1	0	—		—		16	6
Terek Grozny (loan)	2014–15	Russian Premier League	1	0	—		—		—		1	0
Mouscron (loan)	2015–16	Belgian Pro League	24	6	0	0	—		—		24	6
Fehérvár	2016–17	Nemzeti Bajnokság I	24	13	1	3	—		—		25	16
Fehérvár	2017–18	Nemzeti Bajnokság I	26	10	2	0	7	5	—		35	17
Fehérvár	2018–19	Nemzeti Bajnokság I	27	10	8	3	14	1	—		49	14
Fehérvár	2019–20	Nemzeti Bajnokság I	1	0	—		4	0	—		5	0
Fehérvár	Total		78	33	11	8	25	6	—		114	47
Çaykur Rizespor	2019–20	Süper Lig	10	0	3	4	—		—		13	4
Buriram United	2020–21	Thai League 1	9	5	0	0	—		—		9	5
Omonia	2020–21	Cypriot First Division	16	8	2	0	—		—		18	8
Omonia	2021–22	Cypriot First Division	25	7	3	1	5	0	1 (Note: Appearance in Cypriot Super Cup)	1	34	9
Omonia	Total		41	15	5	1	5	0	1	1	52	17
Career total			259	95	30	20	46	7	1	1	337	123

=== International ===
As of 18 December 2013

Serbia
Year	Apps	Goals
2012	2	0
2013	3	0
Total	5	0

== Honours ==
Partizan

- Serbian SuperLiga: 2010–11, 2011–12, 2012–13
- Serbian Cup: 2010–11

Olympiacos

- Super League Greece: 2013–14

Videoton

- Nemzeti Bajnokság I: 2017–18
- Magyar Kupa: 2018–19

Omonia

- Cypriot First Division: 2020–21
- Cypriot Cup: 2021–22
- Cypriot Super Cup: 2021
