= Attila Fiola =

Hungarian footballer

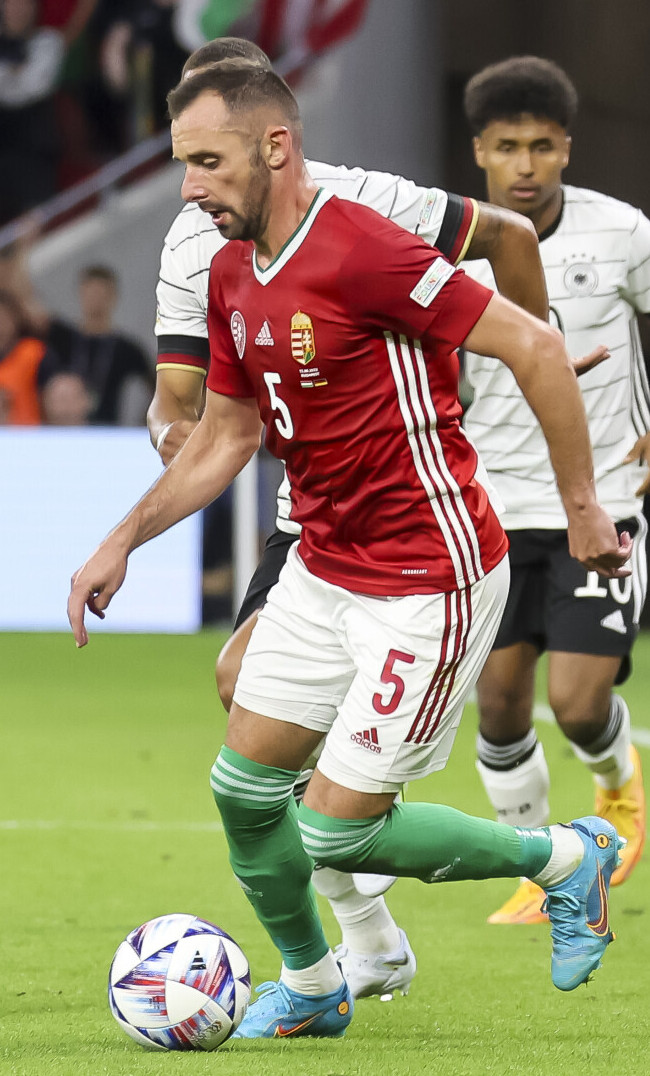
- Fiola in 2022

Personal information
- Full name: Attila Csaba Fiola
- Date of birth: 17 February 1990 (age 36)
- Place of birth: Szekszárd, Hungary
- Height: 1.82 m (6 ft 0 in)
- Position: Right-back

Team information
- Current team: Újpest
- Number: 55

Youth career
- 2002–2008: Paks

Senior career*
| Years | Team | Apps | (Gls) |
| 2008–2015 | Paks | 135 | (1) |
| 2015–2016 | Puskás Akadémia | 38 | (1) |
| 2016–2024 | Fehérvár | 165 | (1) |
| 2024– | Újpest | 49 | (0) |

International career^{‡}
| 2010–2012 | Hungary U21 | 16 | (1) |
| 2014– | Hungary | 64 | (2) |
- * Club domestic league appearances and goals as of 30 May 2026 ‡ National team caps and goals as of 23:17, 23 March 2025 (UTC)

Attila Csaba Fiola (Hungarian pronunciation: [ˈɒtːilɒ ˈt͡ʃɒbɒ ˈfijolɒ], born 17 February 1990) is a Hungarian professional footballer who plays as a right-back for Újpest and the Hungary national team.

== Club career ==
In 2015, Fiola signed for Puskás Akadémia

On 31 August 2016, he signed for Nemzeti Bajnokság I club Videoton.

On 18 March 2024, he returned from his injury in a 2023–24 Nemzeti Bajnokság I match against Kecskeméti TE.

On 1 May 2024, he suffered a shoulder injury during a training. A day later the club confirmed that his shoulder required an operation.

== International career ==
Fiola made 13 appearances for Hungary at under-21 level, debuting on 7 October 2010 against Montenegro in a friendly match. On 10 September 2012, he made his final appearance for Hungary U21 against Liechtenstein, scoring his only goal for the team.

On 14 October 2014, Fiola made his debut for the Hungary senior team in a UEFA Euro 2016 qualifier against the Faroe Islands as a half-time substitute for Nemanja Nikolić. He went on to start the team's final seven matches of Group F, as well as both legs of the play-off against Norway.

He was part of the UEFA Euro 2016 squad, making one appearance at the tournament in the 2–0 victory over Austria in the team's opening Group F match on 14 June 2016.

On 31 March 2021, Fiola scored his first goal for Hungary in a 4–1 win over Andorra during 2022 FIFA World Cup qualification.

On 1 June 2021, he was included in the final 26-man squad to represent Hungary at the rescheduled UEFA Euro 2020 tournament. He started all three of the team's Group F matches at left wing-back, scoring the opening goal of a 1–1 draw with France on 19 June. His goal celebration also gained instant fame as he leaped over a barrier into a media section and wildly banged on the desk of a reporter visibly frightening her. He later apologized and explained that he saw her looking downwards and thought that she was on her phone and wanted to bring her attention to that they had just scored.

On 26 September 2022, Fiola made his 50th appearance for the Hungarian national team in a 0–2 loss to Italy in the UEFA Nations League.

On 14 May 2024, Fiola was named in Hungary's squad for UEFA Euro 2024. He started at right wing-back in the team's 3–1 loss to Switzerland and in central defence in the 2–0 defeat to hosts Germany before being an unused substitute in the 1–0 win over Scotland in Hungary's final Group A match.

== Career statistics ==
=== Club ===
As of match played 30 August 2025

Appearances and goals by club, season and competition
| Club | Season | League | | | National cup | | League cup | | Europe | | Total | |
| Club | Season | Division | Apps | Goals | Apps | Goals | Apps | Goals | Apps | Goals | Apps | Goals |
|---|---|---|---|---|---|---|---|---|---|---|---|---|
| Paks | 2008–09 | NB I | 3 | 0 | 1 | 0 | 3 | 0 | – | | 7 | 0 |
| Paks | 2010–10 | NB I | 14 | 0 | 0 | 0 | 13 | 0 | – | | 27 | 0 |
| Paks | 2010–11 | NB I | 27 | 0 | 3 | 0 | 5 | 0 | – | | 35 | 0 |
| Paks | 2011–12 | NB I | 26 | 0 | 1 | 0 | 1 | 0 | 6 (Note: Appearance(s) in UEFA Europa League) | 0 | 34 | 0 |
| Paks | 2012–13 | NB I | 26 | 0 | 4 | 2 | 3 | 0 | – | | 33 | 2 |
| Paks | 2013–14 | NB I | 26 | 0 | 1 | 0 | 5 | 0 | – | | 32 | 0 |
| Paks | 2014–15 | NB I | 13 | 1 | 0 | 0 | 2 | 0 | – | | 15 | 1 |
| Paks | Total | | 135 | 1 | 10 | 2 | 32 | 0 | 6 | 0 | 183 | 3 |
| Puskás Akadémia | 2014–15 | NB I | 13 | 0 | 0 | 0 | 0 | 0 | – | | 13 | 0 |
| Puskás Akadémia | 2015–16 | NB I | 25 | 1 | 0 | 0 | – | | – | | 25 | 1 |
| Puskás Akadémia | Total | | 38 | 1 | 0 | 0 | – | | – | | 38 | 1 |
| Fehérvár | 2016–17 | NB I | 17 | 0 | 1 | 0 | – | | 0 | 0 | 18 | 0 |
| Fehérvár | 2017–18 | NB I | 25 | 0 | 2 | 0 | – | | 3 | 0 | 30 | 0 |
| Fehérvár | 2018–19 | NB I | 19 | 0 | 3 | 0 | – | | 14 (Note: Eight appearances in UEFA Champions League, six appearances in UEFA Europa League) | 0 | 36 | 0 |
| Fehérvár | 2019–20 | NB I | 17 | 0 | 5 | 0 | – | | 3 | 0 | 25 | 0 |
| Fehérvár | 2020–21 | NB I | 28 | 1 | 6 | 0 | – | | 4 | 0 | 38 | 1 |
| Fehérvár | 2021–22 | NB I | 26 | 0 | 3 | 0 | – | | 1 (Note: Appearance(s) in UEFA Europa Conference League) | 0 | 30 | 0 |
| Fehérvár | 2022–23 | NB I | 21 | 0 | 1 | 0 | – | | 6 | 0 | 28 | 0 |
| Fehérvár | 2023–24 | NB I | 12 | 0 | 1 | 0 | – | | – | | 13 | 0 |
| Fehérvár | Total | | 165 | 1 | 23 | 0 | – | | 31 | 0 | 219 | 1 |
| Újpest | 2024–25 | NB I | 24 | 0 | 1 | 0 | 0 | 0 | – | | 25 | 0 |
| Újpest | 2025–26 | NB I | 6 | 0 | 0 | 0 | – | | – | | 6 | 0 |
| Újpest | Total | | 30 | 0 | 1 | 0 | – | | – | | 31 | 0 |
| Career total | | | 367 | 3 | 34 | 2 | 32 | 0 | 37 | 0 | 470 | 5 |

=== International ===
As of match played on 23 March 2025

Appearances and goals by national team and year
| National team | Year | Apps | Goals |
|---|---|---|---|
| Hungary | 2014 | 3 | 0 |
| Hungary | 2015 | 9 | 0 |
| Hungary | 2016 | 7 | 0 |
| Hungary | 2017 | 2 | 0 |
| Hungary | 2018 | 6 | 0 |
| Hungary | 2019 | – | |
| Hungary | 2020 | 5 | 0 |
| Hungary | 2021 | 10 | 2 |
| Hungary | 2022 | 10 | 0 |
| Hungary | 2024 | 6 | 0 |
| Hungary | 2025 | 2 | 0 |
| Total | | 60 | 2 |

Scores and results list Hungary's goal tally first, score column indicates score after each Fiola goal.

List of international goals scored by Attila Fiola
| No. | Date | Venue | Opponent | Score | Result | Competition |
|---|---|---|---|---|---|---|
| 1 | 31 March 2021 | Estadi Nacional, Andorra la Vella, Andorra | Andorra | 1–0 | 4–1 | 2022 FIFA World Cup qualification |
| 2 | 19 June 2021 | Puskás Aréna, Budapest, Hungary | France | 1–0 | 1–1 | UEFA Euro 2020 |

== Honours ==
Paks

- Hungarian League Cup: 2010–11

Videoton

- Nemzeti Bajnokság I: 2017-18
- Hungarian Cup: 2018-19
