= Anel Hadžić =

Bosnian footballer (born 1989)

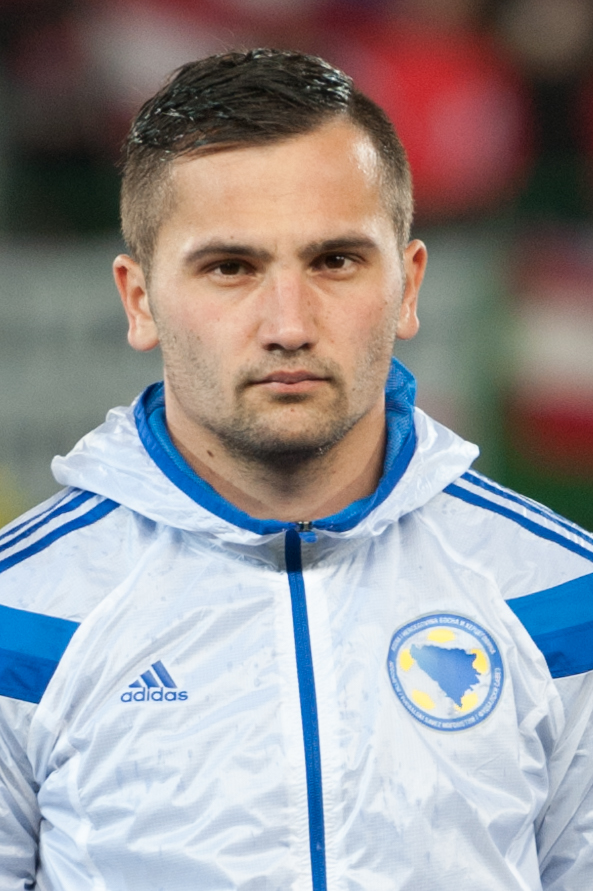
- Hadžić with Bosnia and Herzegovina in 2015

Personal information
- Date of birth: 16 August 1989 (age 37)
- Place of birth: Velika Kladuša, SR Bosnia and Herzegovina, Yugoslavia
- Height: 1.84 m (6 ft 0 in)
- Position: Defensive midfielder

Youth career
- 1997–1999: FC Andorf
- 1999–2007: Ried

Senior career*
Years	Team	Apps	(Gls)
2007–2013	Ried	161	(18)
2013–2016	Sturm Graz	76	(5)
2016	Eskişehirspor	15	(2)
2016–2020	Fehérvár	85	(11)
2021	Wacker Innsbruck	10	(0)
2021	Wels	15	(0)
Total		362	(36)

International career
2008	Austria U20	1	(1)
2009–2010	Austria U21	2	(0)
2014–2017	Bosnia and Herzegovina	14	(0)
- * Club domestic league appearances and goals

Anel Hadžić (pronounced [ǎnel xǎdʒitɕ]; born 16 August 1989) is a Bosnian former professional footballer who played as a defensive midfielder.

Hadžić started his professional career at Ried, before joining Sturm Graz in 2013. Three years later, he was transferred to Eskişehirspor. Later that year, he signed with Fehérvár. In 2021, Hadžić moved to Wacker Innsbruck. He switched to Wels later that year.

A former Austrian youth international, Hadžić made his senior international debut for Bosnia and Herzegovina in 2014, earning 14 caps until 2017. He represented the nation at their first major championship, the 2014 FIFA World Cup.

== Club career ==
=== Early career ===
Because of the outbreak of the Bosnian War, Hadžić's family fled from his native Bosnia and Herzegovina and moved to Austria, where he started playing football at a local club, before joining Ried's youth academy in 1999. He made his professional against Austria Kärnten on 29 September 2007 at the age of 17. On 25 October 2009, he scored his first professional goal against Red Bull Salzburg.

In May 2013, he switched to Sturm Graz.

In January 2016, he was transferred to Turkish side Eskişehirspor.

=== Fehérvár ===
In August 2016, Hadžić signed a two-year deal with Hungarian outfit Fehérvár. He made his official debut for the team in a Magyar Kupa game against Pécs on 14 September and managed to score a goal. Two weeks later, he made his league debut against Honvéd. On 22 October, he scored his first league goal in a triumph over Paks. He won his first title with the club on 27 May 2018, when they were crowned league champions.

In June, Hadžić extended his contract until June 2020.

He played his 100th game for the side against Ferencváros on 20 April 2019.

=== Later stage of career ===
In January 2021, Hadžić moved to Wacker Innsbruck.

In July, he joined Wels.

He announced his retirement from football on 17 December.

== International career ==
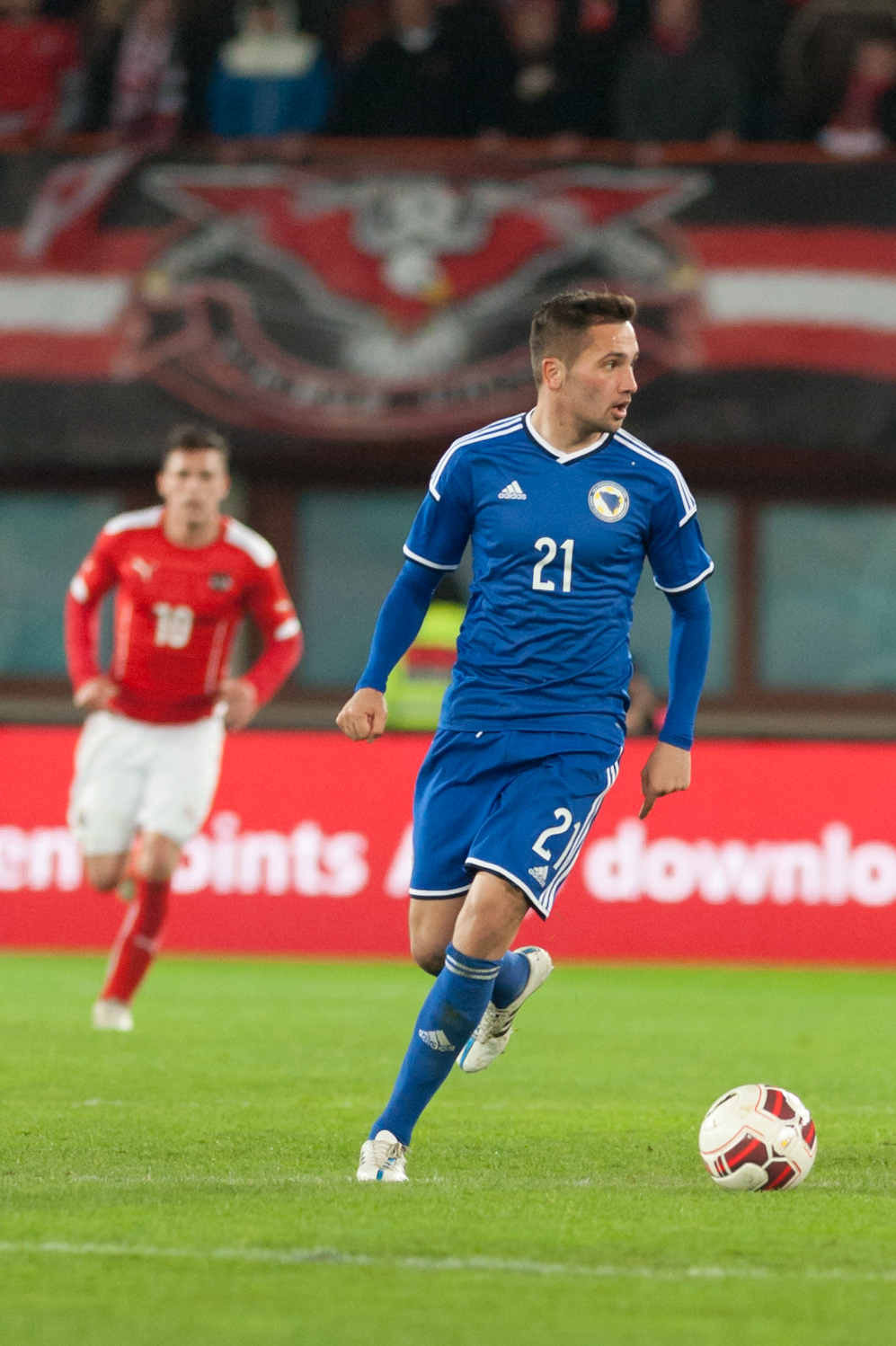
Hadžić playing for Bosnia and Herzegovina in 2015

Despite representing Austria at various youth levels, Hadžić decided to play for Bosnia and Herzegovina at the senior level.

In September 2013, his request to change sports citizenship from Austrian to Bosnian was approved by FIFA. Subsequently, in February 2014, he received his first senior call-up, for a friendly game against Egypt, and debuted in that game on 5 March.

In June 2014, Hadžić was named in Bosnia and Herzegovina's squad for the 2014 FIFA World Cup, country's first major competition. He made his tournament debut in the last group match against Iran on 25 June.

== Personal life ==
Hadžić's younger brother Elvir is also a professional footballer.

He married his long-time girlfriend Alma in June 2019. Together they have a son named Rayan.

== Career statistics ==
=== Club ===
As of match played 6 November 2021

Appearances and goals by club, season and competition
Club	Season	League			National cup (Note: Includes Austrian Cup, Turkish Cup, Magyar Kupa)		Continental		Total	
Club	Season	Division	Apps	Goals	Apps	Goals	Apps	Goals	Apps	Goals
Ried	2007–08	Austrian Bundesliga	14	0	1	0	0	0	15	0
Ried	2008–09	Austrian Bundesliga	20	0	3	0	–		23	0
Ried	2009–10	Austrian Bundesliga	31	1	4	0	–		35	1
Ried	2010–11	Austrian Bundesliga	33	4	5	2	–		38	6
Ried	2011–12	Austrian Bundesliga	33	7	5	1	4 (Note: Appearance(s) in UEFA Europa League)	1	42	9
Ried	2012–13	Austrian Bundesliga	30	6	4	1	4	2	38	9
Ried	Total		161	18	22	4	8	3	191	25
Sturm Graz	2013–14	Austrian Bundesliga	29	2	5	2	2	0	36	4
Sturm Graz	2014–15	Austrian Bundesliga	32	1	2	0	–		34	1
Sturm Graz	2015–16	Austrian Bundesliga	15	2	1	0	1	0	17	2
Sturm Graz	Total		76	5	8	2	3	0	87	7
Eskişehirspor	2015–16	Süper Lig	15	2	1	0	–		16	2
Fehérvár	2016–17	Nemzeti Bajnokság I	20	4	2	1	–		22	5
Fehérvár	2017–18	Nemzeti Bajnokság I	28	5	1	0	7	0	36	5
Fehérvár	2018–19	Nemzeti Bajnokság I	27	2	7	2	13 (Note: Seven appearances and one goal in UEFA Champions League, six appearances in UEFA Europa League)	1	47	5
Fehérvár	2019–20	Nemzeti Bajnokság I	10	0	0	0	3	0	13	0
Fehérvár	Total		85	11	10	3	23	1	118	15
Wacker Innsbruck	2020–21	2. Liga	10	0	–		–		10	0
Wels	2021–22	Austrian Regionalliga Central	15	0	0	0	–		15	0
Career total			362	36	41	9	34	4	437	49

=== International ===
As of match played 3 September 2017

Appearances and goals by national team and year
National team	Year	Apps	Goals
Bosnia and Herzegovina
Bosnia and Herzegovina	2014	6	0
Bosnia and Herzegovina	2015	4	0
Bosnia and Herzegovina	2016	3	0
Bosnia and Herzegovina	2017	1	0
Total		14	0

== Honours ==
Ried

- Austrian Cup: 2010–11

Fehérvár

- Nemzeti Bajnokság I: 2017–18
- Magyar Kupa: 2018–19
