= Armin Hodžić (footballer, born 1994) =

Bosnian footballer

Personal information
- Date of birth: 17 November 1994 (age 31)
- Place of birth: Sarajevo, Bosnia and Herzegovina
- Height: 1.82 m (6 ft 0 in)
- Position: Forward

Team information
- Current team: Gorica
- Number: 15

Youth career
- Željezničar
- 2011–2012: Liverpool

Senior career*
Years	Team	Apps	(Gls)
2012–2014	Liverpool	0	(0)
2012–2014	→ Željezničar (loan)	45	(18)
2014–2018	Dinamo Zagreb	81	(37)
2018–2022	Fehérvár	57	(15)
2020–2021	→ Kasımpaşa (loan)	21	(5)
2023	Željezničar	12	(0)
2023	Shkupi	10	(1)
2024	Žalgiris	23	(4)
2025	Artis Brno	6	(0)
2025–	Gorica	10	(3)

International career
2010	Bosnia and Herzegovina U17	3	(4)
2012–2013	Bosnia and Herzegovina U19	15	(9)
2015–2016	Bosnia and Herzegovina U21	6	(2)
2016–2020	Bosnia and Herzegovina	14	(3)
- * Club domestic league appearances and goals as of 22 November 2025

Armin Hodžić (pronounced [ǎrmin xǒdʒitɕ]; born 17 November 1994) is a Bosnian professional footballer who plays as a forward for Slovenian Second League club Gorica.

Hodžić started his professional career at Željezničar, before joining Dinamo Zagreb in 2014. Four years later, he was transferred to Fehérvár, who loaned him to Kasımpaşa in 2020. In 2023, he went back to Željezničar. Later that year, Hodžić moved to Shkupi. The following year, he signed with Žalgiris. In 2025, he switched to Artis Brno. Later that year, he joined Gorica.

A former youth international for Bosnia and Herzegovina, Hodžić made his senior international debut in 2016, earning 14 caps until 2020.

== Club career ==
=== Early career ===
Hodžić started playing football at his hometown club Željezničar, before joining the youth academy of English team Liverpool in May 2011.

In the summer of 2012, he was sent on a season-long loan to his former squad Željezničar. He made his professional debut against Slavija on 23 October at the age of 17. On 7 April 2013, he scored his first professional goal against the same opponent. In July, his loan was extended for an additional season. He scored his first career hat-trick against Leotar on 25 September.

=== Dinamo Zagreb ===
In May 2014, Hodžić signed a five-year deal with Croatian side Dinamo Zagreb. He made his official debut for the team in a Croatian Cup game against Istra 1961 on 12 February 2015. Two weeks later, he made his league debut against Split. On 3 March, he scored his first goal for Dinamo Zagreb in a triumph over Istra 1961. He won his first trophy with the club on 2 May, when they were crowned league champions.

On 25 July, he scored his first hat-trick for the squad in a defeat of Inter Zaprešić.

Hodžić debuted in the UEFA Champions League against Olympiacos on 20 October. Two weeks later, he scored his first goal in the competition against the same opposition.

In February 2017, he prolonged his contract with Dinamo Zagreb until June 2022.

He played his 100th match for the team against Slaven Belupo on 4 March 2018.

=== Fehérvár ===
In August, Hodžić was transferred to Hungarian outfit Fehérvár for an undisclosed fee. He made his competitive debut for the side in a UEFA Europa League tie against Bate Borisov on 20 September. A week later, he made his league debut against Mezőkövesd. On 31 October, he scored his first goal for Fehérvár in a Magyar Kupa fixture against Vác. Three days later, Hodžić scored his first league goal in a victory over Paks. He won his first title with the club on 25 May 2019, by beating Honvéd in the Magyar Kupa final.

In October 2020, he was loaned to Turkish team Kasımpaşa until the end of the season.

=== Later stage of career ===
In February 2023, Hodžić returned to Željezničar. In August, he moved to Macedonian side Shkupi. In March 2024, he joined Lithuanian outfit Žalgiris.

In January 2025, Hodžić signed with Czech club Artis Brno. In September, he switched to Slovenian side Gorica.

== International career ==
Hodžić represented Bosnia and Herzegovina at all youth levels. He also served as a captain of the under-21 team under coach Darko Nestorović.

In September 2015, he received his first senior call up, for UEFA Euro 2016 qualifiers against Wales and Cyprus, but had to wait until 29 May 2016 to make his debut in a friendly game against Spain.

On 12 October 2019, in a UEFA Euro 2020 qualifier against Finland, Hodžić scored his first senior international goal.

== Personal life ==
Hodžić is a practising Muslim; together with international teammates Ibrahim Šehić, Muhamed Bešić, Izet Hajrović, Sead Kolašinac, Edin Višća and Ervin Zukanović he visited a mosque in Zenica during the national team's concentration.

== Career statistics ==
=== Club ===
As of match played 22 November 2025

Appearances and goals by club, season and competition
Club	Season	League			National cup (Note: Includes Bosnian Cup, Croatian Cup, Magyar Kupa, Turkish Cup, Macedonian Cup, Lithuanian Cup)		Continental		Total	
Club	Season	Division	Apps	Goals	Apps	Goals	Apps	Goals	Apps	Goals
Željezničar (loan)	2012–13	Bosnian Premier League	17	4	5	0	–		22	4
Željezničar (loan)	2013–14	Bosnian Premier League	28	14	4	1	2 (Note: Appearance(s) in UEFA Champions League)	0	34	15
Željezničar (loan)	Total		45	18	9	1	2	0	56	19
Dinamo Zagreb	2014–15	Croatian Football League	6	1	3	1	0	0	9	2
Dinamo Zagreb	2015–16	Croatian Football League	24	13	4	3	6	2	34	18
Dinamo Zagreb	2016–17	Croatian Football League	25	16	6	5	3	0	34	21
Dinamo Zagreb	2017–18	Croatian Football League	24	6	3	1	4 (Note: Appearances in UEFA Europa League)	1	31	8
Dinamo Zagreb	2018–19	Croatian Football League	2	1	0	0	1	1	3	2
Dinamo Zagreb	Total		81	37	16	10	14	4	111	51
Fehérvár	2018–19	Nemzeti Bajnokság I	26	4	8	2	6	0	40	6
Fehérvár	2019–20	Nemzeti Bajnokság I	27	10	7	5	2	0	36	15
Fehérvár	2020–21	Nemzeti Bajnokság I	4	1	0	0	3	0	7	1
Fehérvár	2021–22	Nemzeti Bajnokság I	0	0	1	0	0	0	1	0
Fehérvár	Total		57	15	16	7	11	0	84	22
Kasımpaşa (loan)	2020–21	Süper Lig	21	5	2	2	–		23	7
Željezničar	2022–23	Bosnian Premier League	12	0	5	1	–		17	1
Shkupi	2023–24	Macedonian First League	10	1	2	2	–		12	3
Žalgiris	2024	A Lyga	23	4	2	1	4 (Note: Appearances in UEFA Conference League)	0	29	5
Artis Brno	2024–25	Czech National League	6	0	–		–		6	0
Gorica	2025–26	Slovenian Second League	10	3	0	0	–		10	3
Career total			265	83	52	24	31	4	348	111

=== International ===
Appearances and goals by national team and year
National team	Year	Apps	Goals
Bosnia and Herzegovina
Bosnia and Herzegovina	2016	3	0
Bosnia and Herzegovina	2017	2	0
Bosnia and Herzegovina	2018	0	0
Bosnia and Herzegovina	2019	4	3
Bosnia and Herzegovina	2020	5	0
Total		14	3

Scores and results list Bosnia and Herzegovina's goal tally first, score column indicates score after each Hodžić goal.

List of international goals scored by Armin Hodžić
No.	Date	Venue	Cap	Opponent	Score	Result	Competition
1	12 October 2019	Bilino Polje, Zenica, Bosnia and Herzegovina	6	Finland	4–0	4–1	UEFA Euro 2020 qualifying
2	18 November 2019	Rheinpark Stadion, Vaduz, Liechtenstein	9	Liechtenstein	2–0	3–0	UEFA Euro 2020 qualifying
3	18 November 2019	Rheinpark Stadion, Vaduz, Liechtenstein	9	Liechtenstein	3–0	3–0	UEFA Euro 2020 qualifying

== Honours ==
Željezničar

- Bosnian Premier League: 2012–13

Dinamo Zagreb

- Croatian Football League: 2014–15, 2015–16, 2017–18
- Croatian Cup: 2014–15, 2015–16, 2017–18

Fehérvár

- Magyar Kupa: 2018–19

Žalgiris

- A Lyga: 2024
