= András Fejes (footballer) =

Hungarian footballer

Personal information
- Full name: András Fejes
- Date of birth: 26 August 1988 (age 38)
- Place of birth: Székesfehérvár, Hungary
- Height: 1.87 m (6 ft 2 in)
- Position: Left-back

Team information
- Current team: III. Kerület
- Number: 41

Youth career
- 2003–2007: Videoton

Senior career*
Years	Team	Apps	(Gls)
2007–2017	Videoton	33	(1)
2008–2009	→ Felcsút (loan)	23	(1)
2009–2010	→ Puskás Akadémia (loan)	52	(3)
2010–2011	→ Videoton II	25	(3)
2011–2013	→ Siófok (loan)	42	(0)
2013–2014	→ MTK Budapest	22	(1)
2018–2020	Paks	47	(0)
2020–2021	Győri ETO	31	(5)
2021–	III. Kerület	17	(2)
- * Club domestic league appearances and goals as of 20:39, 4 February 2022 (UTC)

András Fejes (born 26 August 1988, in Székesfehérvár) is a Hungarian football player who currently plays for III. Kerületi TVE.

== Club statistics ==
As of 24 November 2019

Appearances and goals by club, season and competition
Club	Season	League			Cup		League Cup		Europe		Total	
Club	Season	Division	Apps	Goals	Apps	Goals	Apps	Goals	Apps	Goals	Apps	Goals
Felcsút	2008–09	Nemzeti Bajnokság II	23	1	2	1	—		—		25	2
Puskás Akadémia	2009–10	Nemzeti Bajnokság II	24	0	2	0	—		—		26	0
Puskás Akadémia	2010–11	Nemzeti Bajnokság II	28	3	1	0	—		—		29	3
Puskás Akadémia	Total		52	3	3	0	–	–	–	–	55	3
Siófok	2011–12	Nemzeti Bajnokság I	22	0	0	0	4	1	—		26	1
Siófok	2012–13	Nemzeti Bajnokság I	20	0	3	0	4	0	—		27	0
Siófok	Total		42	0	3	0	8	1	–	–	53	1
MTK	2013–14	Nemzeti Bajnokság I	22	1	5	0	2	0	—		29	0
Videoton	2007–08	Nemzeti Bajnokság I	1	0	0	0	7	0	0	0	8	0
Videoton	2009–10	Nemzeti Bajnokság I	0	0	0	0	8	0	0	0	8	0
Videoton	2013–14	Nemzeti Bajnokság I	0	0	0	0	0	0	1	0	1	0
Videoton	2014–15	Nemzeti Bajnokság I	8	0	5	1	9	0	0	0	22	1
Videoton	2015–16	Nemzeti Bajnokság I	11	0	1	0	—		6	0	18	0
Videoton	2016–17	Nemzeti Bajnokság I	4	0	2	0	—		2	0	8	0
Videoton	2017–18	Nemzeti Bajnokság I	11	1	1	1	—		3	0	15	2
Videoton	Total		35	1	9	2	24	0	12	0	70	3
Paks	2017–18	Nemzeti Bajnokság I	7	0	1	0	—		—		8	0
Paks	2018–19	Nemzeti Bajnokság I	28	0	2	0	—		—		30	0
Paks	2019–20	Nemzeti Bajnokság I	12	0	2	0	—		—		14	0
Paks	Total		47	0	5	0	0	0	–	–	52	0
Career total			221	6	27	3	34	1	12	0	284	9
