= Elvir Hadžić =

Bosnian footballer

Personal information
- Date of birth: 18 January 1999 (age 27)
- Place of birth: Cazin, Bosnia and Herzegovina
- Height: 1.87 m (6 ft 2 in)
- Position: Forward

Team information
- Current team: FC Wels
- Number: 71

Youth career
- 2007–2017: SV Ried

Senior career*
| Years | Team | Apps | (Gls) |
| 2017–2019 | Fehérvár II | 48 | (11) |
| 2017–2019 | Fehérvár | 4 | (0) |
| 2019–2020 | Dornbirn | 13 | (0) |
| 2020–2021 | Hertha Wels | 11 | (2) |
| 2021– | FC Wels | 32 | (12) |
- * Club domestic league appearances and goals as of 29 October 2022

Elvir Hadžić (born January 18, 1999) is a Bosnian footballer currently playing for FC Wels.

== Club career ==
An attacker, Hadžić made his debut as a substitute in the Hungarian League on April 14, 2018. He was given a yellow card during the warm up thus has the odd distinction of being booked by a referee before he had made his competitive professional debut.

== Personal life ==
Elvir is the brother of Anel Hadžić who is also a footballer and represented the Bosnia national football team at the 2014 FIFA World Cup. Their cousin Damir Hadžić is also a professional footballer.

== Club statistics ==
| Club | Season | League | | Cup | | Europe | | Total | |
| Club | Season | Apps | Goals | Apps | Goals | Apps | Goals | Apps | Goals |
|---|---|---|---|---|---|---|---|---|---|
MOL Vidi II
| MOL Vidi II | 2016–17 | 13 | 1 | – | – | – | – | 13 | 1 |
| MOL Vidi II | 2017–18 | 23 | 7 | – | – | – | – | 23 | 7 |
| MOL Vidi II | 2018–19 | 12 | 3 | – | – | – | – | 12 | 3 |
| MOL Vidi II | Total | 48 | 11 | – | – | – | – | 48 | 11 |
MOL Vidi
| MOL Vidi | 2017–18 | 3 | 0 | 0 | 0 | 0 | 0 | 3 | 0 |
| MOL Vidi | 2018–19 | 1 | 0 | 1 | 0 | 0 | 0 | 2 | 0 |
| MOL Vidi | Total | 4 | 0 | 1 | 0 | 0 | 0 | 5 | 0 |
| Career Total | | 52 | 11 | 1 | 0 | 0 | 0 | 53 | 11 |

Updated to games played as of 25 May 2019.
