= Bence Szabó (footballer, born 1998) =

Hungarian footballer

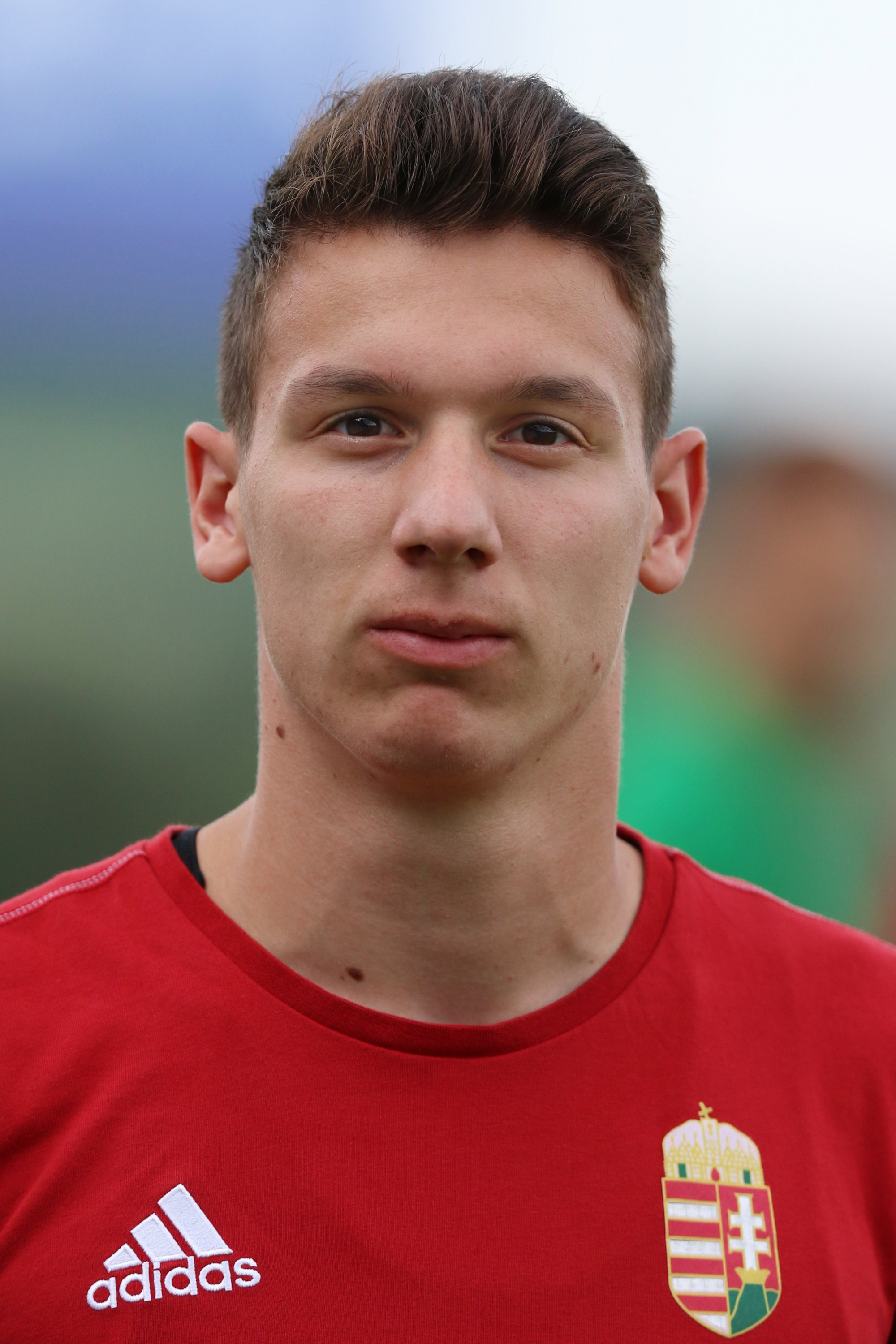
- Szabó in 2017

Personal information
- Date of birth: 16 January 1998 (age 28)
- Place of birth: Székesfehérvár, Hungary
- Height: 1.81 m (5 ft 11 in)
- Position: Midfielder

Team information
- Current team: Csákvár
- Number: 8

Youth career
- 2003–2012: Videoton
- 2012–2015: Puskás Akadémia

Senior career*
Years	Team	Apps	(Gls)
2015–2017	Puskás Akadémia II	27	(0)
2016–2017	Puskás Akadémia	4	(0)
2017–2019	Fehérvár	6	(0)
2018	→ Nyíregyháza (loan)	6	(0)
2018-2019	→ Diósgyőr (loan)	22	(0)
2019–2020	Diósgyőr	8	(0)
2020	Debrecen	4	(1)
2020–2022	Zalaegerszeg	0	(0)
2020–2022	→ Nafta 1903 (loan)	41	(8)
2022–2023	Nafta 1903	29	(7)
2023–2024	Mosonmagyaróvár	34	(7)
2024–	Csákvár	56	(4)

International career
2015–2016	Hungary U-17	3	(1)
2016–2018	Hungary U-19	17	(2)
2018–2020	Hungary U-21	10	(0)
- * Club domestic league appearances and goals as of 31 May 2026

Bence Szabó (born 16 January 1998) is a Hungarian football player who plays for Csákvár.

== Club career ==
On 23 July 2017 he was signed by Nemzeti Bajnokság I club Videoton FC.

== Career statistics ==
Appearances and goals by club, season and competition
Club	Season	League		Cup		Europe		Total	
Club	Season	Apps	Goals	Apps	Goals	Apps	Goals	Apps	Goals
Puskás Akadémia II
Puskás Akadémia II	2015–16	15	0	–	–	–	–	15	0
Puskás Akadémia II	2016–17	12	0	–	–	–	–	12	0
Puskás Akadémia II	Total	27	0	–	–	–	–	27	0
Puskás Akadémia
Puskás Akadémia	2016–17	4	0	1	0	–	–	5	0
Puskás Akadémia	Total	4	0	1	0	–	–	5	0
Videoton
Videoton	2017–18	6	0	2	4	2	0	10	4
Videoton	Total	6	0	2	4	2	0	10	4
Nyíregyháza
Nyíregyháza	2017–18	7	0	0	0	–	–	7	0
Nyíregyháza	Total	7	0	0	0	–	–	7	0
Diósgyőr
Diósgyőr	2018–19	22	0	3	0	–	–	25	0
Diósgyőr	2019–20	8	0	3	1	–	–	11	1
Diósgyőr	Total	30	0	6	1	–	–	36	1
Debrecen
Debrecen	2019–20	4	1	0	0	0	0	4	1
Debrecen	Total	4	1	0	0	0	0	4	1
Career total		78	1	9	5	2	0	89	6

Updated to games played as of 21 June 2020.

== Honours ==
Puskás Akadémia FC

- Nemzeti Bajnokság II: 2016–17
