= 2017–18 Balmazújvárosi FC season =

Balmazújvárosi FC
2017–18 season
- Chairman: (Hungary) István Tiba
- Manager: (Serbia) Ferenc Horváth
- NB 1: 11th (relegated)
- Hungarian Cup: runners-up
- Top goalscorer: League: (Georgia (country)) Bachana Arabuli (9); All: (Georgia (country)) Bachana Arabuli (12)
- Highest home attendance: 2,291 v Ferencváros (2 June 2018)
- Lowest home attendance: 350 v Győr (28 February 2018)
| Home colours | Away colours |

The 2017–18 season will be Balmazújvárosi FC's 1st competitive season, 1st consecutive season in the OTP Bank Liga and 6th year in existence as a football club.

== First team squad ==
Note: Flags indicate national team as defined under FIFA eligibility rules; some limited exceptions apply. Players may hold more than one non-FIFA nationality.

| No. | Pos. | Nation | Player |
|---|---|---|---|
| 1 | GK | HUN | Gergő Szécsi |
| 2 | GK | HUN | Krisztián Pogacsics |
| 4 | DF | HUN | Adrián Rus |
| 5 | DF | HUN | László Tamás |
| 6 | DF | HUN | Krisztián Póti |
| 7 | DF | UKR | Yuriy Habovda |
| 8 | FW | GEO | Bachana Arabuli |
| 9 | FW | HUN | Ádám Fekete |
| 10 | MF | ROU | Ervin Zsiga |
| 11 | MF | ROU | Carlo Erdei |
| 13 | MF | HUN | Dávid Sigér |
| 14 | MF | HUN | Gergely Rudolf |
| 15 | DF | HUN | Bence Jagodics |
| 18 | MF | HUN | Attila Haris |

| No. | Pos. | Nation | Player |
|---|---|---|---|
| 19 | FW | SRB | Nemanja Andrić |
| 21 | MF | CRO | Ante Batarelo |
| 25 | FW | GEO | Lasha Shindagoridze |
| 26 | MF | UKR | Shandor Vayda |
| 27 | MF | HUN | Márk Kónya |
| 30 | MF | HUN | Aladár Virág |
| 33 | DF | NGA | Eke Uzoma |
| 39 | FW | SVK | Zoltán Harsányi |
| 40 | FW | HUN | György Kamarás |
| 41 | FW | HUN | Ferenc Rácz |
| 56 | FW | HUN | Miklós Belényesi |
| 67 | MF | GEO | Irakli Maisuradze |
| 88 | GK | HUN | László Horváth |

=== Out to loan ===
Note: Flags indicate national team as defined under FIFA eligibility rules; some limited exceptions apply. Players may hold more than one non-FIFA nationality.

| No. / Pos. / Nation / Player; 55 / MF / HUN / Norbert Bódis (on loan Szeged) | No. / Pos. / Nation / Player; 71 / MF / HUN / Ádám Orovecz (on loan Kazincbarcika) |

== Transfers ==
=== Summer ===
In: Note: Flags indicate national team as defined under FIFA eligibility rules; some limited exceptions apply. Players may hold more than one non-FIFA nationality.

| No. | Pos. | Nation | Player |
|---|---|---|---|
| 2 | GK | HUN | Krisztián Pogacsics (from Puskás Akadémia) |
| 6 | DF | HUN | Krisztián Póti (from Sopron) |
| 7 | DF | UKR | Yuriy Habovda (from (Ukraine) Rukh Vynnyky) |
| 8 | FW | GEO | Bachana Arabuli (from (Georgia (country)) Dinamo Tbilisi) |
| 15 | DF | HUN | Bence Jagodics (from Szeged) |
| 18 | FW | HUN | Attila Haris (from Ferencváros) |
| 19 | FW | SRB | Nemanja Andrić (from Újpest) |
| 21 | MF | CRO | Ante Batarelo (from (Croatia) Solin) |
| 28 | DF | HUN | Tibor Bokros (from Debrecen) |
| 33 | DF | NGA | Eke Uzoma (from (Germany) Berliner 07) |
| 41 | FW | HUN | Ferenc Rácz (from Mezőkövesd) |
| 67 | MF | GEO | Irakli Maisuradze (from (Cyprus) Ermis Aradippou) |

Out: Note: Flags indicate national team as defined under FIFA eligibility rules; some limited exceptions apply. Players may hold more than one non-FIFA nationality.

| No. | Pos. | Nation | Player |
|---|---|---|---|
| 3 | DF | HUN | Ferenc Papp (to Szeged) |
| 6 | DF | HUN | Ádám Németh (to Dorog) |
| 7 | MF | HUN | Balázs Farkas (to MTK Budapest) |
| 8 | DF | HUN | Dávid Hadházi (to Sopron) |
| 11 | MF | HUN | Norbert Pintér (to Szolnok) |
| 12 | GK | HUN | Tamás Gazsi (to Szolnok) |
| 17 | DF | HUN | Bence Bakos |
| 18 | FW | HUN | Kevin Kapacina (to Tiszaújváros) |
| 22 | MF | HUN | Norbert Heffler (loan return to Mezőkövesd) |
| 27 | DF | HUN | László Kiss (to Békéscsaba) |
| 77 | DF | HUN | Krisztián Balogh (loan return to Debrecen) |

=== Winter ===
In: Note: Flags indicate national team as defined under FIFA eligibility rules; some limited exceptions apply. Players may hold more than one non-FIFA nationality.

| No. | Pos. | Nation | Player |
|---|---|---|---|
| 14 | FW | HUN | Gergely Rudolf (from Nyíregyháza) |
| 27 | MF | HUN | Márk Kónya (from Nyíregyháza) |
| 29 | FW | SVK | Zoltán Harsányi (from Nyíregyháza) |
| 40 | FW | HUN | György Kamarás (loan return from Dorog) |
| 99 | FW | GEO | Lasha Shindagoridze (from (Georgia (country)) Saburtalo) |

Out: Note: Flags indicate national team as defined under FIFA eligibility rules; some limited exceptions apply. Players may hold more than one non-FIFA nationality.

| No. | Pos. | Nation | Player |
|---|---|---|---|
| 23 | FW | HUN | Ádám Kovács (to Zalaegerszeg) |
| 55 | MF | HUN | Norbert Bódis (loan to Szeged) |
| 69 | FW | HUN | Roland Vólent (to Siófok) |
| 71 | MF | HUN | Ádám Orovecz (loan to Kazincbarcika) |

== Statistics ==
=== Appearances and goals ===
Last updated on 2 June 2018.

| No. | Pos | Nat | Player | Total | | OTP Bank Liga | | Hungarian Cup | |
| No. | Pos | Nat | Player | Apps | Goals | Apps | Goals | Apps | Goals |
|---|---|---|---|---|---|---|---|---|---|
| 1 | GK | (Hungary) HUN | Gergő Szécsi | 9 | -8 | 4 | -5 | 5 | -3 |
| 2 | GK | (Hungary) HUN | Krisztián Pogacsics | 10 | -15 | 7 | -11 | 3 | -4 |
| 4 | DF | (Hungary) HUN | Adrián Rus | 34 | 2 | 30 | 2 | 4 | 0 |
| 5 | DF | (Hungary) HUN | László Tamás | 34 | 2 | 29 | 2 | 5 | 0 |
| 6 | DF | (Hungary) HUN | Krisztián Póti | 19 | 0 | 15 | 0 | 4 | 0 |
| 7 | DF | (Ukraine) UKR | Yuriy Habovda | 38 | 2 | 29 | 0 | 9 | 2 |
| 8 | FW | (Georgia (country)) GEO | Bachana Arabuli | 34 | 12 | 29 | 9 | 5 | 3 |
| 9 | FW | (Hungary) HUN | Ádám Fekete | 9 | 2 | 8 | 2 | 1 | 0 |
| 10 | FW | (Romania) ROU | Ervin Zsiga | 26 | 1 | 22 | 0 | 4 | 1 |
| 11 | MF | (Romania) ROU | Carlo Erdei | 7 | 1 | 5 | 1 | 2 | 0 |
| 13 | MF | (Hungary) HUN | Dávid Sigér | 38 | 4 | 32 | 4 | 6 | 0 |
| 14 | MF | (Hungary) HUN | Gergely Rudolf | 14 | 2 | 9 | 2 | 5 | 0 |
| 15 | DF | (Hungary) HUN | Bence Jagodics | 10 | 0 | 4 | 0 | 6 | 0 |
| 18 | MF | (Hungary) HUN | Attila Haris | 30 | 2 | 27 | 2 | 3 | 0 |
| 19 | FW | (Serbia) SRB | Nemanja Andrić | 31 | 6 | 25 | 6 | 6 | 0 |
| 21 | MF | (Croatia) CRO | Ante Batarelo | 22 | 1 | 15 | 1 | 7 | 0 |
| 25 | FW | (Georgia (country)) GEO | Lasha Shindagoridze | 9 | 1 | 5 | 0 | 4 | 1 |
| 26 | MF | (Ukraine) UKR | Shandor Vayda | 39 | 8 | 32 | 4 | 7 | 4 |
| 27 | MF | (Hungary) HUN | Márk Kónya | 6 | 0 | 3 | 0 | 3 | 0 |
| 30 | MF | (Hungary) HUN | Aladár Virág | 4 | 1 | 1 | 0 | 3 | 1 |
| 33 | DF | (Nigeria) NGA | Eke Uzoma | 39 | 0 | 33 | 0 | 6 | 0 |
| 39 | FW | (Slovakia) SVK | Zoltán Harsányi | 7 | 1 | 4 | 0 | 3 | 1 |
| 40 | FW | (Hungary) HUN | György Kamarás | 6 | 0 | 6 | 0 | 0 | 0 |
| 41 | FW | (Hungary) HUN | Ferenc Rácz | 23 | 5 | 18 | 4 | 5 | 1 |
| 56 | FW | (Hungary) HUN | Miklós Belényesi | 5 | 0 | 3 | 0 | 2 | 0 |
| 67 | MF | (Georgia (country)) GEO | Irakli Maisuradze | 34 | 0 | 26 | 0 | 8 | 0 |
| 88 | GK | (Hungary) HUN | László Horváth | 23 | -30 | 22 | -30 | 1 | 0 |
Youth players:
| 29 | DF | (Hungary) HUN | Áron Schmid | 1 | 0 | 0 | 0 | 1 | 0 |
Out to loan:
| 55 | MF | (Hungary) HUN | Norbert Bódis | 3 | 0 | 1 | 0 | 2 | 0 |
| 71 | MF | (Hungary) HUN | Ádám Orovecz | 4 | 0 | 2 | 0 | 2 | 0 |
Players no longer at the club:
| 23 | FW | (Hungary) HUN | Ádám Kovács | 15 | 0 | 13 | 0 | 2 | 0 |
| 69 | FW | (Hungary) HUN | Roland Vólent | 5 | 1 | 3 | 0 | 2 | 1 |

=== Top scorers ===
Includes all competitive matches. The list is sorted by shirt number when total goals are equal.

Last updated on 2 June 2018

| Position | Nation | Number | Name | OTP Bank Liga | Hungarian Cup | Total |
|---|---|---|---|---|---|---|
| 1 | (Georgia (country)) | 8 | Bachana Arabuli | 9 | 3 | 12 |
| 2 | (Ukraine) | 26 | Shandor Vayda | 4 | 4 | 8 |
| 3 | (Serbia) | 19 | Nemanja Andrić | 6 | 0 | 6 |
| 4 | (Hungary) | 41 | Ferenc Rácz | 4 | 1 | 5 |
| 5 | (Hungary) | 13 | Dávid Sigér | 4 | 0 | 4 |
| 6 | (Hungary) | 9 | Ádám Fekete | 2 | 0 | 2 |
| 7 | (Hungary) | 18 | Attila Haris | 2 | 0 | 2 |
| 8 | (Hungary) | 14 | Gergely Rudolf | 2 | 0 | 2 |
| 9 | (Hungary) | 4 | Adrián Rus | 2 | 0 | 2 |
| 10 | (Hungary) | 4 | László Tamás | 2 | 0 | 2 |
| 11 | (Hungary) | 23 | Ádám Kovács | 0 | 2 | 2 |
| 12 | (Ukraine) | 7 | Yuriy Habovda | 0 | 2 | 2 |
| 13 | (Romania) | 11 | Carlo Erdei | 1 | 0 | 1 |
| 14 | (Croatia) | 21 | Carlo Erdei | 1 | 0 | 1 |
| 15 | (Hungary) | 69 | Roland Vólent | 0 | 1 | 1 |
| 16 | (Hungary) | 30 | Aladár Virág | 0 | 1 | 1 |
| 17 | (Romania) | 10 | Ervin Zsiga | 0 | 1 | 1 |
| 18 | (Georgia (country)) | 25 | Lasha Shindagoridze | 0 | 1 | 1 |
| 19 | (Slovakia) | 39 | Zoltán Harsányi | 0 | 1 | 1 |
| / | / | / | Own Goals | 0 | 0 | 0 |
| | | | TOTALS | 39 | 17 | 56 |

=== Disciplinary record ===
Includes all competitive matches. Players with 1 card or more included only.

Last updated on 2 June 2018

| Position | Nation | Number | Name | OTP Bank Liga | | Hungarian Cup | | Total (Hu Total) | |
| Position | Nation | Number | Name | Booked | Sent off (straight red) | Booked | Sent off (straight red) | Booked | Sent off (straight red) |
| GK | (Hungary) | 1 | Gergő Szécsi | 1 | 0 | 1 | 0 | 1 (1) | 1 (0) |
| GK | (Hungary) | 2 | Krisztián Pogacsics | 1 | 0 | 0 | 0 | 1 (1) | 0 (0) |
| DF | (Hungary) | 4 | Adrián Rus | 5 | 0 | 0 | 0 | 5 (5) | 0 (0) |
| DF | (Hungary) | 5 | László Tamás | 7 | 1 | 1 | 0 | 8 (7) | 1 (1) |
| DF | (Hungary) | 6 | Krisztián Póti | 2 | 0 | 0 | 0 | 2 (2) | 0 (0) |
| DF | (Ukraine) | 7 | Yuriy Habovda | 8 | 1 | 2 | 0 | 10 (8) | 1 (1) |
| FW | (Georgia (country)) | 8 | Bachana Arabuli | 3 | 0 | 0 | 0 | 3 (3) | 0 (0) |
| FW | (Hungary) | 9 | Ádám Fekete | 1 | 0 | 0 | 0 | 1 (1) | 0 (0) |
| MF | (Romania) | 10 | Ervin Zsiga | 2 | 0 | 1 | 0 | 3 (2) | 0 (0) |
| MF | (Romania) | 11 | Carlo Erdei | 1 | 0 | 0 | 0 | 1 (1) | 0 (0) |
| MF | (Hungary) | 13 | Dávid Sigér | 7 | 0 | 0 | 0 | 7 (7) | 0 (0) |
| MF | (Hungary) | 14 | Gergely Rudolf | 3 | 0 | 0 | 0 | 3 (3) | 0 (0) |
| DF | (Hungary) | 15 | Bence Jagodics | 1 | 0 | 2 | 0 | 3 (1) | 0 (0) |
| MF | (Hungary) | 18 | Attila Haris | 3 | 0 | 0 | 0 | 3 (3) | 0 (0) |
| FW | (Serbia) | 19 | Nemanja Andrić | 5 | 0 | 0 | 0 | 5 (5) | 0 (0) |
| FW | (Hungary) | 23 | Ádám Kovács | 1 | 0 | 0 | 0 | 1 (1) | 0 (0) |
| MF | (Ukraine) | 26 | Shandor Vayda | 7 | 0 | 0 | 0 | 7 (7) | 0 (0) |
| DF | (Nigeria) | 33 | Eke Uzoma | 4 | 0 | 0 | 0 | 4 (4) | 0 (0) |
| FW | (Hungary) | 41 | Ferenc Rácz | 0 | 0 | 1 | 0 | 1 (0) | 0 (0) |
| MF | (Georgia (country)) | 67 | Irakli Maisuradze | 5 | 0 | 1 | 0 | 6 (5) | 0 (0) |
| GK | (Hungary) | 88 | László Horváth | 3 | 0 | 0 | 0 | 3 (3) | 0 (0) |
| | | | TOTALS | 70 | 2 | 9 | 0 | 79 (70) | 2 (2) |

=== Overall ===
| Games played | 42 (33 OTP Bank Liga and 9 Hungarian Cup) |
| Games won | 14 (8 OTP Bank Liga and 6 Hungarian Cup) |
| Games drawn | 14 (12 OTP Bank Liga and 2 Hungarian Cup) |
| Games lost | 14 (13 OTP Bank Liga and 1 Hungarian Cup) |
| Goals scored | 56 |
| Goals conceded | 52 |
| Goal difference | +4 |
| Yellow cards | 79 |
| Red cards | 2 |
| Worst discipline | (Ukraine) Yuriy Habovda (10 (yellow card) , 1 (red card) ) |
| Best result | 5–0 (H) v Békéscsaba - Hungarian Cup - 14-03-2018 |
| Worst result | 0–5 (A) v Ferencváros - OTP Bank Liga - 10-03-2018 |
| Most appearances | (Nigeria) Eke Uzoma (39 appearances) |
| Most appearances | (Ukraine) Shandor Vayda (39 appearances) |
| Top scorer | (Georgia (country)) Bachana Arabuli (12 goals) |
| Points | 56/126 (44.44%) |

Last updated: 2 June 2018

== Nemzeti Bajnokság I ==
=== Matches ===
| 16 July 2017 1 | Videoton | 1 – 1 | Balmazújváros | Felcsút, Fejér County |
| 17:00 CEST | Lazović 51' | Report | Andrić 17' | Stadium: Pancho Aréna; Attendance: 1,792; Referee: (Hungary) Zoltán Iványi |

| 23 July 2017 2 | Balmazújváros | 0 – 1 | Vasas | Balmazújváros, Hajdú-Bihar County |
| 18:00 CEST | | Report | Remili 5' | Stadium: Városi Sportpálya; Attendance: 1,396; Referee: (Hungary) Sándor Andó-Szabó |

| 29 July 2017 3 | Honvéd | 2 – 2 | Balmazújváros | Budapest, Pest County |
| 20:30 CEST | Eppel 52'; Lanzafame 64' | Report | Vayda 3'; Arabuli 69' | Stadium: Bozsik Stadion; Attendance: 1,753; Referee: (Hungary) Gergely Szőts |

| 5 August 2017 4 | Balmazújváros | 4 – 0 | Diósgyőr | Balmazújváros, Hajdú-Bihar County |
| 18:00 CEST | Haris 40'; Andrić 61'; Rácz 86', 90+2' | Report | | Stadium: Városi Sportpálya; Attendance: 2,206; Referee: (Hungary) Csaba Pintér |

| 12 August 2017 5 | Szombathelyi Haladás | 3 – 1 | Balmazújváros | Sopron, Győr-Moson-Sopron County |
| 18:00 CEST | Williams 24' (pen.), 70'; Jagodics 78' | Report | Vayda 76' | Stadium: Káposztás utcai Stadion; Attendance: 1,162; Referee: (Hungary) Zsolt Szabó |

| 19 August 2017 6 | Puskás Akadémia | 2 – 1 | Balmazújváros | Felcsút, Fejér County |
| 18:00 CEST | Molnár 6'; Knežević 45' | Report | Arabuli 64' (pen.) | Stadium: Pancho Aréna; Attendance: 814; Referee: (Hungary) Péter Solymosi |

| 26 August 2017 7 | Balmazújváros | 0 – 1 | Újpest | Balmazújváros, Hajdú-Bihar County |
| 18:00 CEST | | Report | Simon 64' | Stadium: Városi Sportpálya; Attendance: 2,062; Referee: (Hungary) Viktor Kassai |

| 9 September 2017 8 | Mezőkövesd | 2 – 2 | Balmazújváros | Mezőkövesd, Borsod-Abaúj-Zemplén County |
| 18:00 CEST | Lázár 58'; Střeštík 70' | Report | Arabuli 35', 88' | Stadium: Városi Stadion; Attendance: 2,544; Referee: (Hungary) Ádám Farkas |

| 16 September 2017 9 | Balmazújváros | 0 – 1 | Debrecen | Balmazújváros, Hajdú-Bihar County |
| 18:00 CEST | | Report | Tabaković 47' | Stadium: Városi Sportpálya; Attendance: 2,291; Referee: (Hungary) Tamás Bognár |

| 23 September 2017 10 | Paks | 1 – 0 | Balmazújváros | Paks, Tolna County |
| 18:00 CEST | Kulcsár 35' | Report | | Stadium: Fehérvári úti Stadion; Attendance: 800; Referee: (Hungary) Ferenc Karakó |

| 30 September 2017 11 | Balmazújváros | 2 – 3 | Ferencváros | Balmazújváros, Hajdú-Bihar County |
| 18:00 CEST | Vayda 10'; Sigér 36' | Report | Lovrencsics 39'; Paintsil 55'; Varga 78' (pen.) | Stadium: Városi Sportpálya; Attendance: 2,200; Referee: (Hungary) Zoltán Iványi |

| 14 October 2017 12 | Balmazújváros | 1 – 1 | Videoton | Balmazújváros, Hajdú-Bihar County |
| 15:30 CEST | Andrić 43' | Report | Šćepović 11' | Stadium: Városi Sportpálya; Attendance: 1,438; Referee: (Hungary) József Erdős |

| 21 October 2017 13 | Vasas | 1 – 2 | Balmazújváros | Budapest, Pest County |
| 15:30 CEST | Remili 59' | Report | Sigér 32'; Arabuli 43' | Stadium: Szusza Ferenc Stadion; Attendance: 1,034; Referee: (Hungary) Sándor Andó-Szabó |

| 28 October 2017 14 | Balmazújváros | 0 – 3 | Budapest Honvéd | Balmazújváros, Hajdú-Bihar County |
| 15:30 CEST | | Report | Gazdag 34'; Lanzafame 51' (pen.); Eppel 73' | Stadium: Városi Sportpálya; Attendance: 1,239; Referee: (Hungary) István Vad |

| 4 November 2017 15 | Diósgyőr | 1 – 2 | Balmazújváros | Debrecen, Hajdú-Bihar County |
| 15:30 CET | Karan 33' | Report | Tamás 20'; Arabuli 90+5' (pen.) | Stadium: Nagyerdei Stadion; Attendance: 1,968; Referee: (Hungary) Ádám Farkas |

| 18 November 2017 16 | Balmazújváros | 2 – 1 | Szombathelyi Haladás | Balmazújváros, Hajdú-Bihar County |
| 15:30 CET | Fekete 61'; Sigér 79' | Report | Ramos 21' | Stadium: Városi Sportpálya; Attendance: 1,577; Referee: (Hungary) Viktor Kassai |

| 25 November 2017 17 | Balmazújváros | 2 – 2 | Puskás Akadémia | Balmazújváros, Hajdú-Bihar County |
| 15:30 CET | Sigér 43'; Fekete 87' | Report | Szakály 15'; Perošević 61' | Stadium: Városi Sportpálya; Attendance: 714; Referee: (Hungary) Balázs Berke |

| 2 December 2017 18 | Újpest | 2 – 2 | Balmazújváros | Budapest, Pest County |
| 15:30 CET | Novothny 67' (pen.), 79' (pen.) | Report | Haris 40'; Rácz 47' | Stadium: Szusza Ferenc Stadion; Attendance: Match without spectators Referee: (Hungary) József Erdős |

| 9 December 2017 19 | Balmazújváros | 0 – 0 | Mezőkövesd | Balmazújváros, Hajdú-Bihar County |
| 15:30 CET | | Report | | Stadium: Városi Sportpálya; Attendance: 674; Referee: (Hungary) Sándor Andó-Szabó |

| 24 February 2018 20 | Debrecen | 0 – 2 | Balmazújváros | Debrecen, Hajdú-Bihar County |
| 17:00 CET | | Report | Arabuli 87'; Rácz 90+5' | Stadium: Nagyerdei Stadion; Attendance: 1,824; Referee: (Hungary) József Erdős |

| 3 March 2018 21 | Balmazújváros | 0 – 0 | Paks | Balmazújváros, Hajdú-Bihar County |
| 17:00 CET | | Report | | Stadium: Városi Sportpálya; Attendance: 578; Referee: (Hungary) Viktor Kassai |

| 10 March 2018 22 | Ferencváros | 5 – 0 | Balmazújváros | Budapest, Pest County |
| 17:00 CET | Paintsil 13'; Varga 47' (pen.); Böde 55', 64', 90+2' | Report | | Stadium: Groupama Arena; Attendance: 6,565; Referee: (Hungary) Tamás Bognár |

| 17 March 2018 23 | Videoton | 1 – 0 | Balmazújváros | Felcsút, Fejér County |
| 17:00 CET | Juhász 84' | Report | | Stadium: Pancho Arena; Attendance: 1,169; Referee: (Hungary) Ádám Farkas |

| 31 March 2018 24 | Balmazújváros | 1 – 1 | Vasas | Balmazújváros, Hajdú-Bihar County |
| 17:00 CEST | Andrić 29' | Report | Vida 64' | Stadium: Városi Sportpálya; Attendance: 1,094; Referee: (Hungary) Balázs Berke |

| 7 April 2018 25 | Honvéd | 2 – 0 | Balmazújváros | Budapest, Pest County |
| 17:00 CEST | Danilo 74'; Lanzafame 90+1' (pen.) | Report | | Stadium: Bozsik Stadion; Attendance: 1,534; Referee: (Hungary) Viktor Kassai |

| 14 April 2018 26 | Balmazújváros | 2 – 1 | Diósgyőr | Balmazújváros, Hajdú-Bihar County |
| 17:00 CEST | Rudolf 88' (pen.), 90' (pen.) | Report | Óvári 47' | Stadium: Városi Sportpálya; Attendance: 903; Referee: (Hungary) Sándor Andó-Szabó |

| 21 April 2018 27 | Szombathelyi Haladás | 0 – 0 | Balmazújváros | Szombathely, Vas County |
| 17:00 CEST | | Report | | Stadium: Haladás Sportkomplexum; Attendance: 4,716; Referee: (Hungary) József Erdős |

| 28 April 2018 28 | Puskás Akadémia | 3 – 1 | Balmazújváros | Felcsút, Fejér County |
| 17:00 CEST | Knežević 21'; Radó 80'; Diallo 90+5' | Report | Erdei 16' | Stadium: Pancho Aréna; Attendance: 783; Referee: (Hungary) Balázs Berke |

| 5 May 2018 29 | Balmazújváros | 1 – 1 | Újpest | Balmazújváros, Hajdú-Bihar County |
| 17:00 CEST | Andrić 2' | Report | Litauszki 68' | Stadium: Városi Sportpálya; Attendance: 1,604; Referee: (Hungary) Péter Solymosi |

| 12 May 2018 30 | Mezőkövesd | 1 – 0 | Balmazújváros | Mezőkövesd, Borsod-Abaúj-Zemplén County |
| 17:00 CEST | Koszta 1' | Report | | Stadium: Mezőkövesdi Városi Stadion; Attendance: 2,312; Referee: (Hungary) Gergely Szőts |

| 19 May 2018 31 | Balmazújváros | 4 – 0 | Debrecen | Balmazújváros, Hajdú-Bihar County |
| 17:00 CEST | Andrić 37'; Vayda 47'; Rus 66'; Arabuli 88' | Report | | Stadium: Városi Sportpálya; Attendance: 1,808; Referee: (Hungary) Viktor Kassai |

| 27 May 2018 32 | Paks | 0 – 1 | Balmazújváros | Paks, Tolna County |
| 17:00 CEST | | Report | Rus 90+2' | Stadium: Fehérvári úti Stadion; Attendance: 923; Referee: (Hungary) Péter Solymosi |

| 2 June 2018 33 | Balmazújváros | 3 – 3 | Ferencváros | Balmazújváros, Hajdú-Bihar County |
| 19:00 CEST | Batarelo 19'; Arabuli 28'; Tamás 70' | Report | Tamás 14' (o.g.); Bőle 16'; Uzoma 44' (o.g.) | Stadium: Városi Sportpálya; Attendance: 2,291; Referee: (Hungary) Gergely Szőts |

=== League table ===
| Pos | Team | Pld | W | D | L | GF | GA | GD | Pts | Qualification or relegation |
|---|---|---|---|---|---|---|---|---|---|---|
| 8 | Szombathelyi Haladás | 33 | 11 | 5 | 17 | 35 | 50 | −15 | 38 | |
| 9 | Mezőkövesd | 33 | 9 | 10 | 14 | 35 | 52 | −17 | 37 | |
| 10 | Diósgyőr | 33 | 10 | 6 | 17 | 44 | 53 | −9 | 36 | |
| 11 | Balmazújváros (R) | 33 | 8 | 12 | 13 | 39 | 46 | −7 | 36 | Relegation to the Nemzeti Bajnokság II |
| 12 | Vasas (R) | 33 | 9 | 7 | 17 | 38 | 61 | −23 | 34 | Relegation to the Nemzeti Bajnokság II |

Source: Hungarian Football Federation (in Hungarian), Soccerway
Rules for classification: 1) Points; 2) Matches won; 3) Goal difference; 4) Goals scored; 5) Head-to-head points; 6) Head-to-head goal difference; 7) Head-to-head away goals scored; 8) Fair play ranking; 9) Drawing of lots.
(R) Relegated

=== Results summary ===
| Overall | | | | | | | | Home | | | | | | Away | | | | | |
| Pld | W | D | L | GF | GA | GD | Pts | W | D | L | GF | GA | GD | W | D | L | GF | GA | GD |
|---|---|---|---|---|---|---|---|---|---|---|---|---|---|---|---|---|---|---|---|
| 33 | 8 | 12 | 13 | 39 | 46 | −7 | 36 | 4 | 7 | 5 | 22 | 19 | +3 | 4 | 5 | 8 | 17 | 27 | −10 |

Last updated: 2 June 2018.
Source: NB1

=== Results by round ===
| Round | 1 | 2 | 3 | 4 | 5 | 6 | 7 | 8 | 9 | 10 | 11 | 12 | 13 | 14 | 15 | 16 | 17 | 18 | 19 | 20 | 21 | 22 | 23 | 24 | 25 | 26 | 27 | 28 | 29 | 30 | 31 | 32 | 33 |
|---|---|---|---|---|---|---|---|---|---|---|---|---|---|---|---|---|---|---|---|---|---|---|---|---|---|---|---|---|---|---|---|---|---|
| Ground | A | H | A | H | A | A | H | A | H | A | H | H | A | H | A | H | H | A | H | A | H | A | A | H | A | H | A | A | H | A | H | A | H |
| Result | D | L | D | W | L | L | L | D | L | L | L | D | W | L | W | W | D | D | D | W | D | L | L | D | L | W | D | L | D | L | W | W | D |
| Position | 6 | 10 | 10 | 8 | 10 | 10 | 12 | 12 | 12 | 12 | 12 | 12 | 11 | 11 | 10 | 10 | 10 | 10 | 11 | 9 | 10 | 11 | 12 | 12 | 12 | 10 | 10 | 11 | 12 | 12 | 11 | 10 | 11 |

Updated to match(es) played on 2 June 2018. Source: Matches
A = Away; H = Home; W = Win; D = Draw; L = Loss

== Hungarian Cup ==
| 20 September 2017 Round 6 | Karancslapujtő | 0 – 2 | Balmazújváros | Karancslapujtő, Nógrád County |
| 15:00 CEST | | Report | Habovda 49'; Vólent 53' | Stadium: Karancslapujtő Sporttelep; Attendance: 400; Referee: (Hungary) Miklós Bereczki |

| 25 September 2017 Round 7 | Bátaszék | 0 – 1 | Balmazújváros | Bátaszék, Tolna County |
| 13:30 CEST | | Report | Virág 62' | Stadium: Bátaszék Sporttelep; Attendance: 500; Referee: (Hungary) Gábor Barna |

| 29 November 2017 Round 8 | Dunaújváros | 1 – 3 (a.e.t.) | Balmazújváros | Dunaújváros, Fejér County |
| 16:00 CET | Tóth 77' | Report | Arabuli 5'; Kovács 109', 122' | Stadium: Dunaferr Arena; Attendance: 120; Referee: (Hungary) Attila Molnár |

| 21 February 2018 Round of 16 (1st leg) | Győr | 2 – 3 | Balmazújváros | Győr, Győr-Moson-Sopron County |
| 16:00 CET | Szánthó 28', 70' | Report | Vayda 16'; Arabuli 32' (pen.); Rácz 83' | Stadium: ETO Park; Attendance: 1,000; Referee: (Hungary) Ádám Radványi |

| 28 February 2018 Round of 16 (2nd leg) | Balmazújváros | 0 – 0 (3 – 2 agg.) | Győr | Balmazújváros, Hajdú-Bihar County |
| 17:00 CET | | Report | | Stadium: Városi Sportpálya; Attendance: 350; Referee: (Hungary) József Ducsai |

| 14 March 2018 Quarter-final (1st leg) | Balmazújváros | 5 – 0 | Békéscsaba | Balmazújváros, Hajdú-Bihar County |
| 17:00 CET | Vayda 23', 51', 60'; Zsiga 35'; Habovda 44' | Report | | Stadium: Városi Sportpálya; Attendance: 500; Referee: (Hungary) Attila Molnár |

| 4 April 2018 Quarter-final (2nd leg) | Békéscsaba | 1 – 2 (1 – 7 agg.) | Balmazújváros | Békéscsaba, Békés County |
| 18:00 CEST | Király 75' (pen.) | Report | Shindagoridze 25'; Harsányi 80' | Stadium: Stadion Kórház utcai Attendance: 200; Referee: (Hungary) Gergő Bogár |

| 17 April 2018 Semi-final (1st leg) | Újpest | 2 – 1 | Balmazújváros | Budapest, Pest County |
| 19:00 CEST | Nagy 19', 33' | Report | Arabuli 85' | Stadium: Szusza Ferenc Stadion; Attendance: 1,775; Referee: (Hungary) Csaba Pintér |

| 9 May 2018 Semi-final (2nd leg) | Balmazújváros | 0 – 0 (1 – 2 agg.) | Újpest | Balmazújváros, Hajdú-Bihar County |
| 20:00 CEST | | Report | | Stadium: Városi Sportpálya; Attendance: 1,486; Referee: (Hungary) József Erdős |
