= List of Hungarian football transfers summer 2017 =

This is a list of Hungarian football transfers in the summer transfer window 2017 by club. Only transfers in Nemzeti Bajnokság I, and Nemzeti Bajnokság II are included.

== Nemzeti Bajnokság I ==
=== Balmazújváros ===
In: Note: Flags indicate national team as defined under FIFA eligibility rules; some limited exceptions apply. Players may hold more than one non-FIFA nationality.

No.	Pos.	Nation	Player
2	GK	HUN	Krisztián Pogacsics (from Puskás Akadémia)
6	DF	HUN	Krisztián Póti (from Sopron)
7	DF	UKR	Yuriy Habovda (from (Ukraine) Rukh Vynnyky)
8	FW	GEO	Bachana Arabuli (from (Georgia (country)) Dinamo Tbilisi)
15	DF	HUN	Bence Jagodics (from Szeged)
18	FW	HUN	Attila Haris (from Ferencváros)
19	FW	SRB	Nemanja Andrić (from Újpest)
21	MF	CRO	Ante Batarelo (from (Croatia) Solin)
28	DF	HUN	Tibor Bokros (from Debrecen)
33	DF	NGA	Eke Uzoma (from (Germany) Berliner 07)
41	FW	HUN	Ferenc Rácz (from Mezőkövesd)
67	MF	GEO	Irakli Maisuradze (from (Cyprus) Ermis Aradippou)

Out: Note: Flags indicate national team as defined under FIFA eligibility rules; some limited exceptions apply. Players may hold more than one non-FIFA nationality.

No.	Pos.	Nation	Player
3	DF	HUN	Ferenc Papp (to Szeged)
6	DF	HUN	Ádám Németh (to Dorog)
7	MF	HUN	Balázs Farkas (to MTK Budapest)
8	DF	HUN	Dávid Hadházi (to Sopron)
11	MF	HUN	Norbert Pintér (to Szolnok)
12	GK	HUN	Tamás Gazsi (to Szolnok)
17	DF	HUN	Bence Bakos
18	FW	HUN	Kevin Kapacina (to Tiszaújváros)
22	MF	HUN	Norbert Heffler (loan return to Mezőkövesd)
27	DF	HUN	László Kiss (to Békéscsaba)
77	DF	HUN	Krisztián Balogh (loan return to Debrecen)

=== Budapest Honvéd ===
In: Note: Flags indicate national team as defined under FIFA eligibility rules; some limited exceptions apply. Players may hold more than one non-FIFA nationality.

No.	Pos.	Nation	Player
5	FW	HUN	Gergely Bobál (loan return from Zalaegerszeg)
15	DF	SRB	Stefan Deák (from Mosonmagyaróvár)
16	MF	HUN	Zsolt Pölöskei (from Videoton)
17	FW	BRA	Danilo (from (United Arab Emirates) Dibba Al-Fujairah)
22	DF	NGA	Akeem Latifu (from (Azerbaijan) Zira)
86	DF	HUN	Zsolt Laczkó (loan from Paks)
92	FW	HUN	Kristóf Herjeczki (from Budapest Honvéd youth)

Out: Note: Flags indicate national team as defined under FIFA eligibility rules; some limited exceptions apply. Players may hold more than one non-FIFA nationality.

No.	Pos.	Nation	Player
19	FW	HUN	Márk Koszta (to Mezőkövesd)
26	MF	HUN	Patrik Hidi (to (Spain) Real Oviedo)
38	DF	HUN	Ádám Hajdú (to Paks)

=== Debrecen ===
In: Note: Flags indicate national team as defined under FIFA eligibility rules; some limited exceptions apply. Players may hold more than one non-FIFA nationality.

No.	Pos.	Nation	Player
1	GK	UKR	Oleksandr Nad (from Gyirmót)
2	DF	HUN	Ákos Kinyik (loan return from Budaörs)
6	DF	HUN	Balázs Bényei (from Békéscsaba)
12	GK	SVK	Ján Novota (from (Austria) Rapid Wien)
14	DF	HUN	Krisztián Kuti (loan return from Cigánd)
20	FW	HUN	Tamás Takács (loan return from Nyíregyháza)
21	MF	HUN	Kevin Varga (loan return from Cigánd)
25	FW	SUI	Haris Tabaković (from (Switzerland) Grasshopper)
27	MF	HUN	Ádám Bódi (loan from Videoton)
44	FW	HUN	Tibor Tisza (from Nyíregyháza)
99	MF	HUN	Bence Sós (loan return from Mezőkövesd)

Out: Note: Flags indicate national team as defined under FIFA eligibility rules; some limited exceptions apply. Players may hold more than one non-FIFA nationality.

No.	Pos.	Nation	Player
1	GK	CRO	Ivan Kelava (to (Romania) Politehnica Iași)
2	DF	HUN	Attila Osváth (loan return to Vasas)
10	MF	HUN	Dávid Holman (to (Slovakia) Slovan Bratislava)
15	MF	HUN	Dániel Völgyi (free agent)
16	MF	BIH	Ognjen Đelmić (free agent)
18	FW	NGA	Derick Ogbu (free agent)
22	FW	VEN	Frank Feltscher (free agent)
25	DF	SRB	Dušan Brković (free agent)
28	DF	HUN	Zoltán Nagy (to Debreceni EAC)
44	GK	SRB	Branislav Danilović (loan return to Puskás Akadémia)
53	MF	HUN	Péter Berdó (to Szolnok)
70	MF	UKR	Ivan Bobko (to (Ukraine) Chornomorets Odesa)
87	GK	HUN	István Verpecz (to Paks)
90	FW	BIH	Haris Handžić (to (Bosnia and Herzegovina) Zrinjski Mostar)
91	FW	KOR	Suk Hyun-jun (loan return to (Portugal) Porto)

=== Diósgyőr ===
In: Note: Flags indicate national team as defined under FIFA eligibility rules; some limited exceptions apply. Players may hold more than one non-FIFA nationality.

No.	Pos.	Nation	Player
7	FW	HUN	Gábor Makrai (from Puskás Akadémia)
8	MF	HUN	Bálint Oláh (loan return from Zalaegerszeg)
9	FW	HUN	Patrik Bacsa (loan return from Kisvárda)
14	FW	HUN	Zsolt Óvári (from Puskás Akadémia)
15	MF	HUN	Barnabás Tóth (from Vác)
21	DF	HUN	Gergő Kocsis (loan from (Slovakia) Dunajská Streda)
23	DF	HUN	Dávid Forgács (from (Italy) Ancona)
33	FW	GRE	Nikolaos Ioannidis (from (Greece) Asteras Tripolis)

Out: Note: Flags indicate national team as defined under FIFA eligibility rules; some limited exceptions apply. Players may hold more than one non-FIFA nationality.

No.	Pos.	Nation	Player
2	DF	LVA	Vitālijs Jagodinskis (to (Romania) Politehnica Iași)
15	MF	CMR	Patrick Mevoungou (to Puskás Akadémia)
23	MF	GEO	Murtaz Daushvili (released)
50	FW	CIV	Georges Griffiths (dead)
68	MF	HUN	Ramon Halmai (to (Austria) Markt Allhau)
86	FW	HUN	Soma Novothny (loan return to (Belgium) Sint-Truidense)

=== Ferencváros ===
In: Note: Flags indicate national team as defined under FIFA eligibility rules; some limited exceptions apply. Players may hold more than one non-FIFA nationality.

No.	Pos.	Nation	Player
5	DF	BRA	Marquinhos Pedroso (loan from (Brazil) Figueirense)
22	MF	HUN	Kenny Otigba (from (Netherlands) Heerenveen)
23	MF	HUN	Lukács Bőle (from (Romania) Politehnica Iași)
25	DF	SVN	Miha Blažič (from (Slovenia) Domžale)
27	MF	URU	Fernando Gorriarán (from (Uruguay) River Plate)
28	MF	GHA	Joseph Paintsil (from (Ghana) Tema Youth)
29	FW	HUN	Tamás Priskin (from (Slovakia) Slovan Bratislava)
30	MF	POR	Rui Pedro (from (Bulgaria) CSKA Sofia)
91	FW	HUN	Balázs Lovrencsics (loan return from Soroksár)

Out: Note: Flags indicate national team as defined under FIFA eligibility rules; some limited exceptions apply. Players may hold more than one non-FIFA nationality.

No.	Pos.	Nation	Player
5	DF	GER	Oliver Hüsing (to (Germany) F.C. Hansa Rostock)
6	MF	HUN	László Kleinheisler (loan return to (Germany) S.V. Werder Bremen)
10	FW	HUN	András Radó (to Puskás)
16	MF	HUN	Tamás Csilus (to Nyíregyháza)
18	MF	KOR	Ryu Seung-woo (loan return to (Germany) Bayer 04 Leverkusen)
23	FW	AUT	Marco Djuricin (loan return to (Austria) Salzburg)
27	DF	POL	Michał Nalepa (to (Poland) Lechia Gdańsk)
30	MF	SRB	Vladan Cukic (retired)
35	FW	GER	Florian Trinks (to (Germany) Chemnitzer FC)
55	GK	HUN	Levente Jova (to Nyíregyháza)
66	DF	AUT	Emir Dilaver (to (Poland) Lech Poznań)
95	MF	HUN	Attila Haris (to Balmazújváros)

=== Mezőkövesd ===
In: Note: Flags indicate national team as defined under FIFA eligibility rules; some limited exceptions apply. Players may hold more than one non-FIFA nationality.

No.	Pos.	Nation	Player
4	MF	CRO	Frano Mlinar (from (Switzerland) Wil)
9	FW	HUN	Csanád Novák (from Vasas)
10	MF	HUN	Bence Iszlai (from Szombathely)
13	DF	HUN	Pál Lázár (from Diósgyőr)
17	DF	SVK	Róbert Pillár (from (Slovakia) Senica)
19	FW	HUN	Márk Koszta (from Budapest Honvéd)
21	MF	SVK	Jakub Brašeň (from (Slovakia) Dunajská Streda)
22	GK	SVK	Martin Krnáč (from (Slovakia) Slovan Bratislava)
23	MF	SEN	Paul Keita (from (Greece) Kerkyra)
24	FW	HUN	Tamás Cseri (from Kisvárda)
25	DF	HUN	Dániel Vadnai (from MTK Budapest)
29	FW	HUN	Márk Murai (from (Germany) TSG Sprockhövel)
38	FW	SVK	Tomáš Majtán (from (Italy) Racing Roma)
41	DF	HUN	Attila Szalai (from (Austria) Rapid Wien)
80	MF	SVK	Máté Köböl (from Salgótarján)

Out: Note: Flags indicate national team as defined under FIFA eligibility rules; some limited exceptions apply. Players may hold more than one non-FIFA nationality.

No.	Pos.	Nation	Player
4	DF	HUN	Béla Balogh (to MTK Budapest)
9	FW	MLI	Ulysse Diallo (to Puskás Akadémia)
9	MF	HUN	Norbert Heffler (to Kisvárda)
10	MF	CRO	Marko Dinjar (to Szeged)
10	FW	HUN	Roland Frőhlich (to Ferencváros)
17	MF	HUN	Tamás Egerszegi (to (Poland) Miedź Legnica)
19	FW	EST	Tarmo Kink (to (Estonia) Levadia)
21	DF	MKD	Aleksandar Damčevski (to (Cyprus) Ermis)
24	MF	HUN	Dávid Hegedűs (to Kazincbarcika)
33	FW	HUN	Gábor Molnár (to Puskás Akadémia)
50	GK	HUN	Márton Czuczi (to Pénzügyőr)
66	DF	HUN	Alex Engel (to Kazincbarcika)

=== Paks ===
In: Note: Flags indicate national team as defined under FIFA eligibility rules; some limited exceptions apply. Players may hold more than one non-FIFA nationality.

No.	Pos.	Nation	Player
23	DF	HUN	András Vági (loan return from Mezőkövesd)
28	MF	HUN	Márk Nikházi (from MTK Budapest)
38	DF	HUN	Ádám Hajdú (from Budapest Honvéd)
46	MF	HUN	Ádám Simon (from Haladás)
87	GK	HUN	István Verpecz (from Debrecen)
—	FW	HUN	Máté Adamcsek (from Ferencváros)
—	DF	HUN	Máté Berdó (from MTK Budapest)
—	FW	HUN	Bence Daru (from Zalaegerszeg)
—	FW	HUN	Norbert Kokenszky (from Rákosmente)
—	FW	HUN	Richárd Nagy (loan return from SZEOL)

Out: Note: Flags indicate national team as defined under FIFA eligibility rules; some limited exceptions apply. Players may hold more than one non-FIFA nationality.

No.	Pos.	Nation	Player
—	DF	HUN	Zsolt Laczkó (loan to Budapest Honvéd)
—	FW	HUN	Zsolt Balázs (to Zalaegerszeg)
—	DF	HUN	Dávid Kelemen (to Nyíregyháza)
—	DF	HUN	Gábor Kovács (to Csákvár)
—	GK	HUN	György Székely (to (Germany) Schott Mainz)
—	MF	HUN	Dávid Bor (loan to Sopron)
—	FW	HUN	Richárd Jelena (loan to Csákvár)
—	MF	HUN	Barna Kesztyűs (loan to Nyíregyháza)
—	FW	HUN	Norbert Kokenszky (loan to Sopron)
—	MF	HUN	Róbert Kővári (loan to Sopron)
—	DF	HUN	András Szalai (loan to Dorog)

=== Puskás Akadémia ===
In: Note: Flags indicate national team as defined under FIFA eligibility rules; some limited exceptions apply. Players may hold more than one non-FIFA nationality.

No.	Pos.	Nation	Player
7	FW	HUN	Márk Szécsi (from Nyíregyháza)
9	FW	MLI	Ulysse Diallo (from Mezőkövesd)
10	FW	HUN	András Radó (from Ferencváros)
12	MF	HUN	Balázs Balogh (from Újpest)
14	DF	BEL	Jonathan Heris (from Újpest)
15	MF	CMR	Patrick Mevoungou (from Diósgyőr)
16	MF	HUN	Roland Sallai (from return from (Italy) Palermo)
24	DF	HUN	Patrik Poór (from MTK Budapest)
27	MF	ALB	Liridon Latifi (from (Albania) Skënderbeu Korçë)
28	MF	CRO	Stipe Bačelić-Grgić (from return from Mezőkövesd)
30	MF	CRO	Josip Knežević (from (Croatia) Osijek)
32	DF	CRO	Ivor Horvat (from (Slovenia) Koper)
33	FW	HUN	Gábor Molnár (from Mezőkövesd)
44	GK	SRB	Branislav Danilović (from return from Debrecen)
71	DF	HUN	Attila Osváth (from Vasas)
77	FW	CRO	Antonio Perošević (from (Croatia) Osijek)
80	MF	HUN	Márk Madarász (from Gyirmót)
—	DF	HUN	Ádám Lipcsei (from return from Csákvár)

Out: Note: Flags indicate national team as defined under FIFA eligibility rules; some limited exceptions apply. Players may hold more than one non-FIFA nationality.

No.	Pos.	Nation	Player
1	GK	HUN	Bence Gundel-Takács (to Újpest)
2	DF	HUN	Tibor Heffler (to Cegléd)
3	DF	HUN	Gyula Forró (to Nyíregyháza)
5	DF	HUN	Bence Tóth (to Videoton)
6	DF	HUN	Gábor Gyömbér (to Soroksár)
7	MF	UKR	Dmytro Lyopa (to (Croatia) Osijek)
7	MF	HUN	László Pekár (to Nyíregyháza)
10	FW	HUN	Zsolt Óvári (to Diósgyőr)
15	MF	HUN	Bence Szabó (to Videoton)
16	MF	HUN	Roland Sallai (to (Cyprus) APOEL Nicosia)
17	FW	HUN	Gábor Makrai (to Diósgyőr)
29	FW	HUN	László Lencse (to MTK Budapest)
23	GK	HUN	Krisztián Pogacsics (to Balmazújváros)
32	MF	HUN	Lóránd Szatmári (to Győr)
49	DF	SRB	Branko Pauljević (to Újpest)
52	DF	HUN	Alex Damásdi (to Cegléd)
91	DF	HUN	Gergő Vaszicsku (to Budafok)
—	DF	HUN	Ákos Fodor (to Kisvárda)
—	DF	HUN	Dániel Kertai (to Iváncsa)

=== Videoton ===
In: Note: Flags indicate national team as defined under FIFA eligibility rules; some limited exceptions apply. Players may hold more than one non-FIFA nationality.

No.	Pos.	Nation	Player
18	MF	HUN	Bence Szabó (from Puskás Akadémia)
21	FW	NGA	Ezekiel Henty (from (Russia) Lokomotiv Moscow)
23	DF	HUN	Krisztián Tamás (from Gyirmót)
51	GK	HUN	András Hársfalvi (from Zalaegerszeg)

Out: Note: Flags indicate national team as defined under FIFA eligibility rules; some limited exceptions apply. Players may hold more than one non-FIFA nationality.

No.	Pos.	Nation	Player
8	MF	HUN	Zsolt Pölöskei (to Budapest Honvéd)
13	GK	HUN	Illés Zöldesi (loan to Kisvárda)
14	MF	HUN	Zsombor Bévárdi (loan to Siófok)
46	MF	HUN	Ádám Simon (to Haladás)
95	DF	HUN	Márton Lorentz (loan to Siófok)

== See also ==
- 2017–18 Nemzeti Bajnokság I
- 2017–18 Nemzeti Bajnokság II
- 2017–18 Nemzeti Bajnokság III
- 2017–18 Magyar Kupa
