= List of Hungarian football transfers winter 2017–18 =

This is a list of Hungarian football transfers in the winter transfer window 2017–18 by club. Only transfers in Nemzeti Bajnokság I, and Nemzeti Bajnokság II are included.

== Nemzeti Bajnokság I ==
=== Balmazújváros ===
In: Note: Flags indicate national team as defined under FIFA eligibility rules; some limited exceptions apply. Players may hold more than one non-FIFA nationality.

No.	Pos.	Nation	Player
14	FW	HUN	Gergely Rudolf (from Nyíregyháza)
27	MF	HUN	Márk Kónya (from Nyíregyháza)
29	FW	SVK	Zoltán Harsányi (from Nyíregyháza)
40	FW	HUN	György Kamarás (loan return from Dorog)
99	FW	GEO	Lasha Shindagoridze (from (Georgia (country)) Saburtalo)

Out: Note: Flags indicate national team as defined under FIFA eligibility rules; some limited exceptions apply. Players may hold more than one non-FIFA nationality.

No.	Pos.	Nation	Player
23	FW	HUN	Ádám Kovács (to Zalaegerszeg)
55	MF	HUN	Norbert Bódis (loan to Szeged)
69	FW	HUN	Roland Vólent (to Siófok)
71	MF	HUN	Ádám Orovecz (loan to Kazincbarcika)

=== Budapest Honvéd ===
In: Note: Flags indicate national team as defined under FIFA eligibility rules; some limited exceptions apply. Players may hold more than one non-FIFA nationality.

No.	Pos.	Nation	Player
13	DF	HUN	Tibor Heffler (from Cegléd)
33	DF	CRO	Tonći Kukoč (from (Bosnia and Herzegovina) Zrinjski Mostar)
61	DF	SVK	Tomáš Košút (from (Poland) Arka Gdynia)
—	DF	HUN	Botond Erdélyi (loan return from Kisvárda)

Out: Note: Flags indicate national team as defined under FIFA eligibility rules; some limited exceptions apply. Players may hold more than one non-FIFA nationality.

No.	Pos.	Nation	Player
5	FW	HUN	Gergely Bobál (to Csákvár)
20	MF	HUN	Mihály Csábi (to Monor)
22	DF	NGA	Akeem Latifu (to (Norway) Sogndal)
86	DF	HUN	Zsolt Laczkó (loan return to Paks)
89	DF	HUN	Balázs Villám (to Gyirmót)

=== Debrecen ===
In: Note: Flags indicate national team as defined under FIFA eligibility rules; some limited exceptions apply. Players may hold more than one non-FIFA nationality.

No.	Pos.	Nation	Player
86	GK	SVK	Tomáš Košický (from (Israel) Hapoel Ra'anana)
—	FW	HUN	Krisztián Kerekes (loan return from Budafok)

Out: Note: Flags indicate national team as defined under FIFA eligibility rules; some limited exceptions apply. Players may hold more than one non-FIFA nationality.

No.	Pos.	Nation	Player
5	DF	HUN	Péter Szilvási (to Gyirmót)
12	GK	SVK	Ján Novota (retired)
27	MF	SVK	Karol Mészáros (to Szombathelyi Haladás)

=== Diósgyőr ===
In: Note: Flags indicate national team as defined under FIFA eligibility rules; some limited exceptions apply. Players may hold more than one non-FIFA nationality.

No.	Pos.	Nation	Player
8	MF	KOS	Florent Hasani (from (Kosovo) Trepça'89)
25	DF	SRB	Dušan Brković (from (Latvia) Riga)
71	MF	UKR	Serhiy Shestakov (from (Ukraine) Olimpik Donetsk)

Out: Note: Flags indicate national team as defined under FIFA eligibility rules; some limited exceptions apply. Players may hold more than one non-FIFA nationality.

No.	Pos.	Nation	Player
8	MF	HUN	Bálint Oláh (to Mezőkövesd)
17	MF	HUN	Miklós Kitl (to Dorog)
30	MF	ESP	Nono (to (Slovakia) Slovan Bratislava)
33	DF	HUN	Milán Nemes (to Siófok)

=== Ferencváros ===
In: Note: Flags indicate national team as defined under FIFA eligibility rules; some limited exceptions apply. Players may hold more than one non-FIFA nationality.

No.	Pos.	Nation	Player
11	FW	SRB	Dejan Georgijević (from (Serbia) Voždovac)
14	MF	HUN	Dominik Nagy (loan from (Poland) Legia Warsaw)

Out: Note: Flags indicate national team as defined under FIFA eligibility rules; some limited exceptions apply. Players may hold more than one non-FIFA nationality.

No.	Pos.	Nation	Player
3	MF	HUN	Norbert Kundrák (loan to Soroksár)
11	MF	HUN	István Bognár (to Mezőkövesd)
17	MF	HUN	Kornél Csernik (loan to Soroksár)

=== Mezőkövesd ===
In: Note: Flags indicate national team as defined under FIFA eligibility rules; some limited exceptions apply. Players may hold more than one non-FIFA nationality.

No.	Pos.	Nation	Player
5	MF	HUN	Bálint Oláh (from Diósgyőr)
11	MF	HUN	István Bognár (from Ferencváros)
21	FW	SRB	Stefan Dražić (from (Belgium) Mechelen)
23	FW	CMR	Fabrice Onana (from (Tunisia) Hammam-Lif)
27	MF	SVK	Patrik Mišák (from (Poland) Termalica Nieciecza)
31	GK	HUN	Tamás Horváth (goalkeeper) (from Videoton)
32	DF	CRO	Matija Katanec (from (Bosnia and Herzegovina) Zrinjski Mostar)
—	GK	HUN	Pál Tarczy (from Mosonmagyaróvár)

Out: Note: Flags indicate national team as defined under FIFA eligibility rules; some limited exceptions apply. Players may hold more than one non-FIFA nationality.

No.	Pos.	Nation	Player
14	FW	SRB	Lazar Veselinović (to (Serbia) Rad)
15	MF	CZE	Marek Střeštík (to Kisvárda)
16	MF	HUN	István Csirmaz (loan to Szolnok)
21	MF	SVK	Jakub Brašeň (to (Slovakia) Senica)
22	GK	SVK	Martin Krnáč (to (Czech Republic) Karviná)
23	MF	SEN	Paul Keita (to (Belgium) Beveren)
38	FW	SVK	Tomáš Majtán (to (Slovakia) Skalica)
80	MF	SVK	Máté Köböl (to Veszprém)
90	GK	SVK	Tomáš Tujvel (to Videoton)
99	MF	HUN	Márk Murai (loan to Kazincbarcika)

=== Paks ===
In: Note: Flags indicate national team as defined under FIFA eligibility rules; some limited exceptions apply. Players may hold more than one non-FIFA nationality.

No.	Pos.	Nation	Player
14	DF	HUN	András Fejes (from Videoton)
86	DF	HUN	Zsolt Laczkó (loan return from Budapest Honvéd)
98	FW	HUN	Richárd Jelena (loan return from Csákvár)

Out: Note: Flags indicate national team as defined under FIFA eligibility rules; some limited exceptions apply. Players may hold more than one non-FIFA nationality.

No.	Pos.	Nation	Player
86	DF	HUN	Zsolt Laczkó (to Vasas)
94	FW	HUN	Bence Daru (loan to Győr)

=== Puskás Akadémia ===
In: Note: Flags indicate national team as defined under FIFA eligibility rules; some limited exceptions apply. Players may hold more than one non-FIFA nationality.

No.	Pos.	Nation	Player
—	DF	SVN	Denis Klinar (from (Slovenia) Olimpija Ljubljana)
—	MF	URU	Gonzalo Vega (from (Uruguay) River Plate)
—	DF	SVN	Dejan Trajkovski (from (Netherlands) Twente)

Out: Note: Flags indicate national team as defined under FIFA eligibility rules; some limited exceptions apply. Players may hold more than one non-FIFA nationality.

No.	Pos.	Nation	Player
9	MF	HUN	Martin Hudák (to Zalaegerszeg)

=== Szombathelyi Haladás ===
In: Note: Flags indicate national team as defined under FIFA eligibility rules; some limited exceptions apply. Players may hold more than one non-FIFA nationality.

No.	Pos.	Nation	Player
10	FW	SVK	Karol Mészáros (from Debrecen)
—	DF	SVK	Kristián Kolčák (from (Kazakhstan) Aktobe)

Out: Note: Flags indicate national team as defined under FIFA eligibility rules; some limited exceptions apply. Players may hold more than one non-FIFA nationality.

No.	Pos.	Nation	Player
3	DF	HUN	Dávid Tóth (loan to Sopron)
4	DF	HUN	Gábor Jánvári (to Kisvárda)
24	MF	HUN	Benjamin Tóth
32	FW	ITA	Leandro Martínez (retired)
33	DF	HUN	Szilárd Devecseri (to Zalaegerszeg)

=== Újpest ===
In: Note: Flags indicate national team as defined under FIFA eligibility rules; some limited exceptions apply. Players may hold more than one non-FIFA nationality.

No.	Pos.	Nation	Player
—	DF	BIH	Dženan Bureković (from (Serbia) Vojvodina)
—	MF	HUN	Kristóf Németh (from Újpest II)

Out: Note: Flags indicate national team as defined under FIFA eligibility rules; some limited exceptions apply. Players may hold more than one non-FIFA nationality.

No.	Pos.	Nation	Player
16	MF	SWE	Anton Salétros (loan return to (Sweden) AIK Fotboll)
32	GK	HUN	Zoltán Kovács (to Zalaegerszeg)

=== Vasas ===
In: Note: Flags indicate national team as defined under FIFA eligibility rules; some limited exceptions apply. Players may hold more than one non-FIFA nationality.

No.	Pos.	Nation	Player
—	MF	HUN	Dávid Barczi (from Videoton)
—	MF	HUN	Tamás Egerszegi (from (Poland) Miedź Legnica)
—	DF	HUN	Zsolt Laczkó (from Paks)
—	FW	HUN	Norbert Csiki (from Gyirmót)

Out: Note: Flags indicate national team as defined under FIFA eligibility rules; some limited exceptions apply. Players may hold more than one non-FIFA nationality.

No.	Pos.	Nation	Player
12	MF	HUN	Botond Király (loan to Csákvár)
12	FW	GRE	Nikos Vergos (loan return to (Greece) Olympiacos)
15	DF	HUN	Máté Czingráber (to Sopron)

=== Videoton ===
In: Note: Flags indicate national team as defined under FIFA eligibility rules; some limited exceptions apply. Players may hold more than one non-FIFA nationality.

No.	Pos.	Nation	Player
9	MF	HUN	Szabolcs Huszti (from (China) Changchun Yatai)
12	GK	SVK	Tomáš Tujvel (from Mezőkövesd)
14	FW	SRB	Stefan Šćepović (from (Spain) Getafe)
19	MF	MKD	Boban Nikolov (from (North Macedonia) Vardar)

Out: Note: Flags indicate national team as defined under FIFA eligibility rules; some limited exceptions apply. Players may hold more than one non-FIFA nationality.

No.	Pos.	Nation	Player
1	GK	HUN	Tamás Horváth (to Mezőkövesd)
6	DF	HUN	András Fejes (to Paks)
31	MF	HUN	Dávid Barczi (to Vasas)

== See also ==
- 2017–18 Nemzeti Bajnokság I
- 2017–18 Nemzeti Bajnokság II
- 2017–18 Nemzeti Bajnokság III
- 2017–18 Magyar Kupa
