= List of Hungarian football transfers winter 2018–19 =

This is a list of Hungarian football transfers in the winter transfer window 2018-19 by club. Only transfers in Nemzeti Bajnokság I, and Nemzeti Bajnokság II are included.

== Nemzeti Bajnokság I ==
=== Budapest Honvéd ===
In: Note: Flags indicate national team as defined under FIFA eligibility rules; some limited exceptions apply. Players may hold more than one non-FIFA nationality.

No.	Pos.	Nation	Player
2	DF	ALG	Mohamed Mezghrani (from (Algeria) USM Alger)
17	MF	TUN	Änis Ben-Hatira (from (Turkey) Gaziantepspor)
48	MF	GEO	Zakaria Beglarishvili (loan from (Estonia) Flora Tallinn)

Out: Note: Flags indicate national team as defined under FIFA eligibility rules; some limited exceptions apply. Players may hold more than one non-FIFA nationality.

No.	Pos.	Nation	Player
8	MF	HUN	Gergő Holdampf (to Haladás)
14	MF	HUN	Nikolasz Kovács (loan to Balmazújváros)
15	DF	SRB	Stefan Deák (to (Serbia) Napredak)
17	MF	CZE	Tomáš Pilík (to (Czech Republic) Jablonec)
28	MF	HUN	Patrik Hidi (to (Kazakhstan) Irtysh Pavlodar)
36	DF	HUN	Botond Baráth (to (United States) Kansas City)

=== Debrecen ===
In: Note: Flags indicate national team as defined under FIFA eligibility rules; some limited exceptions apply. Players may hold more than one non-FIFA nationality.

No.	Pos.	Nation	Player
5	DF	HUN	Bence Pávkovics (from Újpest)
19	FW	HUN	Dániel Zsóri (from Debrecen II)
42	GK	HUN	Alex Hrabina (from Cigánd)

Out: Note: Flags indicate national team as defined under FIFA eligibility rules; some limited exceptions apply. Players may hold more than one non-FIFA nationality.

No.	Pos.	Nation	Player
4	MF	ROU	Ioan Filip (to (Romania) Dinamo București)
5	DF	HUN	Bence Pávkovics (loan return to Újpest)
10	FW	HUN	Norbert Könyves (to Paks)
19	MF	ESP	Ezequiel Calvente

=== Diósgyőr ===
In: Note: Flags indicate national team as defined under FIFA eligibility rules; some limited exceptions apply. Players may hold more than one non-FIFA nationality.

No.	Pos.	Nation	Player
5	MF	CMR	Ismaila Ousman (from (Cameroon) AS Fortuna)
14	FW	HUN	Gábor Boros (loan return from Budafok)
21	MF	HUN	Tamás Géringer (from Diósgyőr II)
29	DF	CMR	Yannick Ndzoumou (from (Cameroon) AS Fortuna)

Out: Note: Flags indicate national team as defined under FIFA eligibility rules; some limited exceptions apply. Players may hold more than one non-FIFA nationality.

No.	Pos.	Nation	Player
5	DF	HUN	Zoltán Lipták (to Gyirmót)
19	DF	HUN	Tibor Nagy
94	DF	HUN	Gábor Eperjesi (to Mezőkövesd)

=== Ferencváros ===
In: Note: Flags indicate national team as defined under FIFA eligibility rules; some limited exceptions apply. Players may hold more than one non-FIFA nationality.

No.	Pos.	Nation	Player
14	MF	UKR	Ihor Kharatin (from (Ukraine) Zorya Luhansk)
20	FW	BLR	Mikalay Signevich (from (Belarus) BATE)
29	MF	BEL	Marten Wilmots (free agent)
33	DF	GEO	Lasha Dvali (from (Poland) Pogoń Szczecin)
77	FW	HUN	Krisztofer Szerető (from (England) Stoke City)
88	FW	BRA	Isael (free agent)
93	FW	NOR	Tokmac Nguen (from (Norway) Strømsgodset)
—	MF	SYR	Ammar Ramadan (free agent)

Out: Note: Flags indicate national team as defined under FIFA eligibility rules; some limited exceptions apply. Players may hold more than one non-FIFA nationality.

No.	Pos.	Nation	Player
7	FW	ISL	Kjartan Finnbogason (to (Denmark) Vejle)
11	FW	SRB	Dejan Georgijević (loan to (Serbia) Partizan)
15	MF	ARG	Matías Rodríguez (loan to (Ecuador) Universidad Católica)
17	MF	HUN	Kornél Csernik (loan to Soroksár)
30	MF	POR	Rui Pedro (loan to Haladás)
40	MF	NIG	Amadou Moutari (to Mezőkövesd)
91	FW	HUN	Balázs Lovrencsics (to Győr)

=== Kisvárda ===
In: Note: Flags indicate national team as defined under FIFA eligibility rules; some limited exceptions apply. Players may hold more than one non-FIFA nationality.

No.	Pos.	Nation	Player
4	DF	UKR	Anton Kravchenko (from (Ukraine) Olimpik Donetsk)
6	MF	GRE	Stavros Tsoukalas (from (Greece) Apollon Smyrnis)
13	MF	ROU	Gheorghe Grozav (from (Romania) Dinamo București)
77	FW	POR	Hugo Seco (from (Kazakhstan) Irtysh Pavlodar)

Out: Note: Flags indicate national team as defined under FIFA eligibility rules; some limited exceptions apply. Players may hold more than one non-FIFA nationality.

No.	Pos.	Nation	Player
4	DF	HUN	Gábor Jánvári (to Siófok)
25	DF	HUN	Martin Izing (loan to Siófok)
29	MF	SRB	Vuk Mitošević (to (Serbia) Vojvodina)
32	MF	HUN	Ferenc Rácz
33	DF	UKR	Temur Partsvania (to (Ukraine) Desna Chernihiv)
70	FW	UKR	Artem Milevskyi (to (Belarus) Dinamo Brest)

=== Mezőkövesd ===
In: Note: Flags indicate national team as defined under FIFA eligibility rules; some limited exceptions apply. Players may hold more than one non-FIFA nationality.

No.	Pos.	Nation	Player
4	DF	HUN	Gábor Eperjesi (from Diósgyőr)
8	FW	HUN	Roland Baracskai (loan return from Győr)
9	MF	HUN	László Pekár (from Nyíregyháza)
26	MF	HUN	Lajos Bertus (from Paks)
40	MF	NIG	Amadou Moutari (from Ferencváros)
71	FW	HUN	Filip Dragóner (from Nyíregyháza)

Out: Note: Flags indicate national team as defined under FIFA eligibility rules; some limited exceptions apply. Players may hold more than one non-FIFA nationality.

No.	Pos.	Nation	Player
8	FW	HUN	Roland Baracskai (loan to Csákvár)
9	FW	BRA	André Alves
18	MF	HUN	Zoltán Varjas (loan to Cegléd)
14	FW	HUN	Botond Földi (loan to Cegléd)
20	FW	HUN	László Varjas (loan to Vác)
99	MF	ROU	Dominik Wieland (loan to Vác)

=== MTK Budapest ===
In: Note: Flags indicate national team as defined under FIFA eligibility rules; some limited exceptions apply. Players may hold more than one non-FIFA nationality.

No.	Pos.	Nation	Player
7	MF	HUN	Szabolcs Schön (from (Netherlands) Ajax U-19)
17	MF	AUT	Slobodan Mihajlović (from (Austria) Horn)
18	FW	MLI	Ulysse Diallo (from Puskás Akadémia)
71	MF	HUN	Anton Bidzilya (from MTK Budapest U-19)
73	DF	HUN	Benedek Varju (from MTK Budapest U-19)
74	MF	HUN	Gergely Kapronczai (from MTK Budapest U-19)
—	DF	HUN	Norbert Farkas (from Balmazújváros)

Out: Note: Flags indicate national team as defined under FIFA eligibility rules; some limited exceptions apply. Players may hold more than one non-FIFA nationality.

No.	Pos.	Nation	Player
7	FW	HUN	Balázs Farkas (to Zalaegerszeg)
8	MF	HUN	András Schäfer (to (Italy) Genoa)
17	MF	HUN	Kevin Korozmán (to Soroksár)
62	DF	HUN	Ronald Takács (to (Slovakia) Inter Bratislava)
—	DF	HUN	Norbert Farkas (loan to Monor)

=== Paks ===
In: Note: Flags indicate national team as defined under FIFA eligibility rules; some limited exceptions apply. Players may hold more than one non-FIFA nationality.

No.	Pos.	Nation	Player
2	DF	HUN	Dávid Bobál (from (Czech Republic) Dukla Prague)
6	MF	HUN	Benjámin Cseke (from Újpest)
19	MF	HUN	Barna Kesztyűs (loan return from Budaörs)
20	DF	HUN	Péter Zachán (loan return from Dorog)
22	MF	HUN	József Windecker (from (Greece) Levadiakos)
28	MF	HUN	László Zsidai (from Puskás Akadémia)
42	FW	HUN	Norbert Könyves (from Debrecen)

Out: Note: Flags indicate national team as defined under FIFA eligibility rules; some limited exceptions apply. Players may hold more than one non-FIFA nationality.

No.	Pos.	Nation	Player
15	FW	HUN	Péter Horváth (to Siófok)
26	MF	HUN	Lajos Bertus (to Mezőkövesd)
28	MF	HUN	Márk Nikházi (to III. Kerület)
88	GK	HUN	Vilmos Borsos (loan to Budaörs)

=== Szombathely ===
In: Note: Flags indicate national team as defined under FIFA eligibility rules; some limited exceptions apply. Players may hold more than one non-FIFA nationality.

No.	Pos.	Nation	Player
7	MF	POR	Rui Pedro (loan from Ferencváros)
11	MF	UKR	Oleh Holodyuk (from (Ukraine) Karpaty Lviv)
22	DF	HUN	Dávid Mohl (from Újpest)
85	DF	SVK	Kornel Saláta (from (Slovakia) Slovan Bratislava)
88	MF	HUN	Gergő Holdampf (from Budapest Honvéd)

Out: Note: Flags indicate national team as defined under FIFA eligibility rules; some limited exceptions apply. Players may hold more than one non-FIFA nationality.

No.	Pos.	Nation	Player
6	MF	HUN	Máté Kovalovszki (loan to Mosonmagyaróvár)
9	MF	DEN	Emil Lyng (to (Iceland) Valur)
11	MF	SRB	Miroslav Grumić (to Zalaegerszeg)
13	DF	CZE	Vít Beneš (loan return to Vasas)
16	MF	HUN	Barnabás Rácz (to Újpest)
27	MF	HUN	Lóránt Kovács (to Újpest)
80	MF	HUN	Balázs Petró (loan to Győr)
—	FW	SVK	Patrik Pinte (loan to (Slovakia) Komárno)

=== Puskás Akadémia ===
In: Note: Flags indicate national team as defined under FIFA eligibility rules; some limited exceptions apply. Players may hold more than one non-FIFA nationality.

No.	Pos.	Nation	Player
3	DF	SVK	Richard Križan (from (Slovakia) Nitra)
9	FW	HUN	Bence Sós (loan from Fehérvár)
11	FW	HUN	Dániel Prosser (loan return from (Romania) Sepsi)
26	DF	BUL	Kamen Hadzhiev (from (Bulgaria) Beroe)
29	FW	HUN	Nándor Tamás (loan return from Csákvár)
77	FW	PAN	Tony Taylor (from (United States) Ottawa)
80	MF	HUN	Márk Madarász (loan return from Zalaegerszeg)

Out: Note: Flags indicate national team as defined under FIFA eligibility rules; some limited exceptions apply. Players may hold more than one non-FIFA nationality.

No.	Pos.	Nation	Player
9	FW	ECU	Bryan de Jesús (loan return to (Ecuador) El Nacional)
11	FW	HUN	Dániel Prosser (loan to Diósgyőr)
17	MF	HUN	László Zsidai (to Paks)
80	MF	HUN	Márk Madarász (loan to Győr)

=== Videoton ===
In: Note: Flags indicate national team as defined under FIFA eligibility rules; some limited exceptions apply. Players may hold more than one non-FIFA nationality.

No.	Pos.	Nation	Player
2	DF	ESP	Joan Campins (from (Spain) Reus Deportiu)
6	MF	HUN	Ákos Elek (from (Kazakhstan) Kairat)
18	FW	HUN	Márkó Futács (from (Croatia) Hajduk Split)
77	DF	HUN	Bendegúz Bolla (loan return from Siófok)

Out: Note: Flags indicate national team as defined under FIFA eligibility rules; some limited exceptions apply. Players may hold more than one non-FIFA nationality.

No.	Pos.	Nation	Player
14	FW	SRB	Stefan Šćepović (to (Poland) Jagiellonia)
55	DF	HUN	Bence Tóth (loan to Vasas)
70	MF	HUN	Bence Sós (loan to Puskás Akadémia)
77	DF	HUN	Bendegúz Bolla (loan to Zalaegerszeg)

== Nemzeti Bajnokság II ==
=== Balmazújváros ===
In: Note: Flags indicate national team as defined under FIFA eligibility rules; some limited exceptions apply. Players may hold more than one non-FIFA nationality.

No.	Pos.	Nation	Player
6	MF	HUN	Viktor Pongrácz (from Győr)
17	DF	HUN	Bátor Szabó (from III. Kerület)
41	DF	HUN	Ákos Király (from Budapest Honvéd II)
77	MF	HUN	Nikolasz Kovács (loan from Budapest Honvéd)

Out: Note: Flags indicate national team as defined under FIFA eligibility rules; some limited exceptions apply. Players may hold more than one non-FIFA nationality.

No.	Pos.	Nation	Player
11	FW	SVK	Zoltán Harsányi (to Ajka)
23	DF	HUN	Mózes Aranyos (to Rákosmente)
40	FW	HUN	György Kamarás (to Gyirmót)
56	MF	HUN	Viktor Peszmeg (to Monor)
71	MF	HUN	Ádám Orovecz (to Salgótarján)
77	MF	HUN	Richárd Balázs (to Rákospalota)
91	DF	HUN	András Szalai (loan return to Paks)
92	DF	HUN	Norbert Farkas (to MTK Budapest)

=== Békéscsaba ===
In: Note: Flags indicate national team as defined under FIFA eligibility rules; some limited exceptions apply. Players may hold more than one non-FIFA nationality.

No.	Pos.	Nation	Player
3	DF	HUN	Zoltán Dávid (from Békéscsaba U-19)
39	MF	HUN	László Mácsai (from Békéscsaba U-19)
69	FW	HUN	Roland Vólent (from Gyirmót)
77	MF	HUN	Sinan Sinanovic (from Nyíregyháza)

Out: Note: Flags indicate national team as defined under FIFA eligibility rules; some limited exceptions apply. Players may hold more than one non-FIFA nationality.

No.	Pos.	Nation	Player

== See also ==
- 2018–19 Nemzeti Bajnokság I
- 2018–19 Nemzeti Bajnokság II
- 2018–19 Nemzeti Bajnokság III
- 2018–19 Magyar Kupa
