= Carlo Erdei =

Romanian football player

Personal information
- Full name: Carlo Alex Erdei
- Date of birth: 22 March 1996 (age 30)
- Place of birth: Satu Mare, Romania
- Height: 1.82 m (6 ft 0 in)
- Position: Midfielder

Youth career
- –2015: Olimpia Satu Mare
- 2013–2015: Wolverhampton
- 2015: Pandurii Târgu Jiu

Senior career*
Years	Team	Apps	(Gls)
2016–2017	Pandurii Târgu Jiu	0	(0)
2016	→ Universitatea Cluj (loan)	9	(0)
2016–2017	→ Olimpia Satu Mare (loan)	13	(1)
2017–2019	Balmazújváros	29	(2)
2019–2020	FK Csíkszereda	15	(0)
2020–2021	Kaposvár	23	(2)
2021–2024	Tiszakécske	90	(6)
2024	Haladás	15	(0)
2024–2025	Minaur Baia Mare	11	(0)
2025	Szeged-Csanád	14	(0)

International career
2012	Romania U17	3	(0)
- * Club domestic league appearances and goals as of 25 May 2025

Carlo Alex Erdei (born 22 March 1996) is a Romanian football player who plays as a midfielder.

== Club career ==
On 21 April 2017, he was signed by Nemzeti Bajnokság I club Balmazújvárosi FC.

On 28 June 2019, he was signed by Liga II club FK Csíkszereda.
