= László Tamás =

Romanian footballer (born 1988)

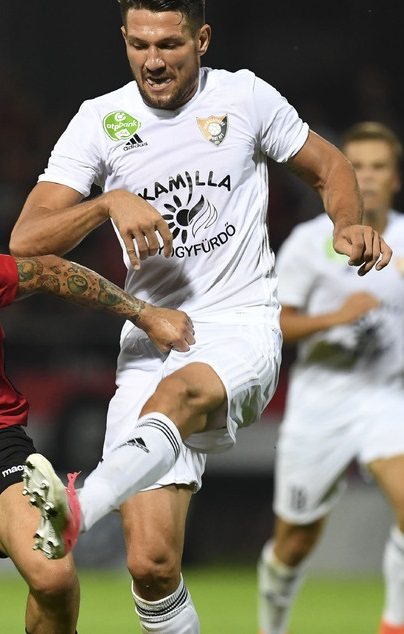
- Tamás playing for Balmazújváros in 2017

Personal information
- Full name: László Hunor Tamás
- Date of birth: 18 January 1988 (age 38)
- Place of birth: Gheorgheni, Romania
- Height: 1.94 m (6 ft 4 in)
- Position: Defender

Team information
- Current team: Szentlőrinc
- Number: 5

Youth career
- 2002–2007: Pécs
- 2003–2004: → Pellérd SE (loan)

Senior career*
Years	Team	Apps	(Gls)
2007–2012	Pécs	0	(0)
2007–2012	→ Szentlőrinc (loan)	128	(12)
2012–2014	Union Kopfing		
2013–2016	Vasas	26	(1)
2015–2016	→ Siófok (loan)	24	(3)
2016–2018	Balmazújváros	57	(3)
2018–2019	Haladás	22	(0)
2019–2021	Szolnok	45	(2)
2021–	Szentlőrinc	83	(5)
- * Club domestic league appearances and goals as of 10 June 2025

László Hunor Tamás (born 18 January 1988) is a Romanian football player of Hungarian descent who plays for Szentlőrinc football club.

== Club career ==
On 16 July 2017 he was signed by Nemzeti Bajnokság I club Balmazújvárosi FC.

== Career statistics ==
Appearances and goals by club, season and competition
Club	Season	League			Cup		League Cup		Total	
Club	Season	Division	Apps	Goals	Apps	Goals	Apps	Goals	Apps	Goals
Szentlőrinc	2007–08	Nemzeti Bajnokság III	32	3	0	0	—		32	3
Szentlőrinc	2008–09	Nemzeti Bajnokság III	28	3	3	1	—		31	4
Szentlőrinc	2009–10	Nemzeti Bajnokság III	20	1	2	1	—		22	2
Szentlőrinc	2010–11	Nemzeti Bajnokság III	23	3	1	0	—		24	3
Szentlőrinc	2011–12	Nemzeti Bajnokság III	25	2	—		—		25	2
Szentlőrinc	Total		128	12	6	2	—		134	14
Pécs	2008–09	Nemzeti Bajnokság II	0	0	0	0	1	0	1	0
Vasas	2013–14	Nemzeti Bajnokság II	13	1	0	0	1	0	14	1
Vasas	2014–15	Nemzeti Bajnokság II	13	0	1	0	5	1	19	1
Vasas	Total		26	1	1	0	6	1	33	2
Siófok	2015–16	Nemzeti Bajnokság II	24	3	1	0	—		25	3
Balmazújváros	2016–17	Nemzeti Bajnokság II	28	1	1	1	—		29	2
Balmazújváros	2017–18	Nemzeti Bajnokság I	29	2	5	0	—		34	2
Balmazújváros	Total		57	3	6	1	—		63	4
Haladás	2018–19	Nemzeti Bajnokság I	21	0	2	0	—		23	0
Career total			256	17	16	3	7	1	279	23

Updated to games played as of 11 May 2019.
