= Attila Haris =

Hungarian footballer (born 1997)

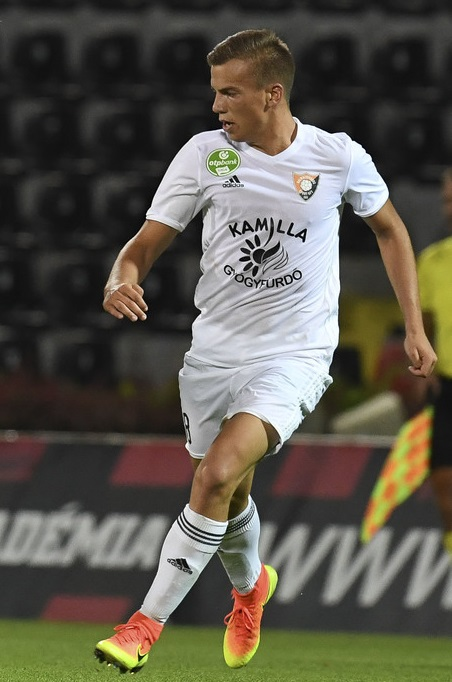
- Haris playing Balmazújváros in 2017

Personal information
- Date of birth: 23 January 1997 (age 29)
- Place of birth: Szolnok, Hungary
- Height: 1.77 m (5 ft 10 in)
- Position: Midfielder

Team information
- Current team: Kecskemét
- Number: 6

Youth career
- 2008–2014: Ferencváros

Senior career*
Years	Team	Apps	(Gls)
2014–2017	Ferencváros	1	(0)
2014–2017	→ Ferencváros II	15	(0)
2015–2017	→ Soroksár (loan)	32	(2)
2017–2018	Balmazújváros	27	(2)
2018–2021	Debrecen	72	(1)
2021–2023	Soroksár	43	(0)
2023	Paks	8	(0)
2023–2025	Szeged	59	(1)
2025–	Kecskemét	24	(0)

International career^{‡}
2015–2016	Hungary U-18	1	(0)
2015–2016	Hungary U-19	3	(0)
2016–2017	Hungary U-21	1	(0)
- * Club domestic league appearances and goals as of 31 May 2026 ‡ National team caps and goals as of 30 July 2017

Attila Haris (born 23 January 1997) is a Hungarian professional footballer who plays as a midfielder for Nemzeti Bajnokság II club Kecskemét.

== Career ==
On 24 May 2015, Haris played his first professional match for Ferencvárosi TC in a 1–0 win against Budapest Honvéd in the Hungarian League. On 1 February 2016, Haris was loaned to Soroksár SC. He played for them until Ferencváros TC gave him to Balmazújvárosi FC on 30 June 2017.

On 6 January 2023, Haris signed a three-and-a-half-year contract with Paks.

== Career statistics ==
Appearances and goals by club, season and competition
Club	Season	League		Cup		League Cup		Europe		Total	
Club	Season	Apps	Goals	Apps	Goals	Apps	Goals	Apps	Goals	Apps	Goals
Ferencváros
Ferencváros	2014–15	1	0	0	0	10	0	0	0	11	0
Ferencváros	2015–16	0	0	2	2	–	–	0	0	2	2
Ferencváros	Total	1	0	2	2	10	0	0	0	13	2
Ferencváros II
Ferencváros II	2015–16	15	0	0	0	–	–	–	–	15	0
Ferencváros II	Total	15	0	0	0	0	0	0	0	15	0
Soroksár
Soroksár	2015–16	5	1	0	0	–	–	–	–	5	1
Soroksár	2016–17	27	1	0	0	–	–	–	–	27	1
Soroksár	Total	32	2	0	0	0	0	0	0	32	2
Balmazújváros
Balmazújváros	2017–18	27	2	3	0	–	–	–	–	30	2
Balmazújváros	Total	27	2	3	0	0	0	0	0	30	2
Debrecen
Debrecen	2018–19	31	0	7	0	–	–	–	–	38	0
Debrecen	2019–20	24	1	2	0	–	–	4	0	30	1
Debrecen	Total	55	1	9	0	0	0	4	0	68	1
Career total		130	5	14	2	10	0	4	0	158	7

Updated to games played as of 27 June 2020.
