= Norbert István =

Romanian footballer (born 1996)

Norbert Bódis
Personal information
- Full name: Norbert István Bódis
- Date of birth: 19 January 1997 (age 29)
- Place of birth: Zalău, Romania
- Position: Midfielder

Team information
- Current team: Balmazújváros
- Number: 55

Youth career
- 2013–2015: Nyíregyháza

Senior career*
| Years | Team | Apps | (Gls) |
| 2015– | Balmazújváros | 38 | (0) |
- * Club domestic league appearances and goals as of 19 May 2019

Norbert István Bódis (born 18 March 1996) is a Romanian football player of Hungarian descent who currently plays for Balmazújvárosi FC.

== Career ==
On 23 September 2017 he was signed by Nemzeti Bajnokság I club Balmazújvárosi FC.

== Career statistics ==
Appearances and goals by club, season and competition
| Club | Season | League | | | Cup | | Europe | | Total | |
| Club | Season | Division | Apps | Goals | Apps | Goals | Apps | Goals | Apps | Goals |
|---|---|---|---|---|---|---|---|---|---|---|
| Balmazújváros | 2015–16 | Nemzeti Bajnokság II | 5 | 0 | 2 | 0 | — | | 7 | 0 |
| Balmazújváros | 2016–17 | Nemzeti Bajnokság II | 31 | 0 | 2 | 0 | — | | 33 | 0 |
| Balmazújváros | 2017–18 | Nemzeti Bajnokság I | 1 | 0 | 2 | 0 | — | | 3 | 0 |
| Balmazújváros | 2018–19 | Nemzeti Bajnokság II | 1 | 0 | 1 | 0 | — | | 2 | 0 |
| Career total | | | 38 | 0 | 7 | 0 | 0 | 0 | 45 | 0 |

Updated to games played as of 19 May 2019.
