= Toni Golem =

Croatian footballer (born 1982)

Personal information
- Date of birth: 14 January 1982 (age 44)
- Place of birth: Split, SFR Yugoslavia
- Height: 1.86 m (6 ft 1 in)
- Position: Defender

Team information
- Current team: Śląsk Wrocław (manager)

Youth career
- –2000: Hajduk Split

Senior career*
Years	Team	Apps	(Gls)
2001–2005	Mosor Žrnovnica		
2005	Hrvatski Dragovoljac	18	(2)
2006–2007	Górnik Łęczna	32	(0)
2007–2008	Ruch Chorzów	10	(0)
2009–2010	Inter Zaprešić	26	(1)
2010–2012	Karlovac	2	(0)

Managerial career
- 2019: Balmazújváros
- 2019–2020: Lučko
- 2022–2023: Solin
- 2023: Hajduk Split U19
- 2023: Rudeš
- 2024: Triglav Kranj
- 2026–: Śląsk Wrocław
- * Club domestic league appearances and goals

Toni Golem (Croatian pronunciation: [tôni ɡǒlem, tôː-]; born 14 January 1982) is a Croatian professional football manager and former player who played as a defender. He currently serves as the manager of Ekstraklasa club Śląsk Wrocław.

== Managerial career ==
After retiring in 2012, Golem began his coaching career at his former club, Hrvatski Dragovoljac. He signed a contract until June 2014. He worked in the staff until just before the summer 2017. He then joined the staff of manager Željko Kopić in Slaven Belupo, functioning as an assistant coach.

On 13 November 2018, Željko Kopić was appointed as the new manager of Hajduk Split, where Golem followed with him, remaining as his assistant. In the end of November 2017, Golem finished his UEFA Pro Licence course. Golem left Hajduk in the summer 2018.

On 3 January 2019, Golem became the manager of Balmazújvárosi FC in the Nemzeti Bajnokság II and in July that year he took over at Lučko.

During his second stint as an assistant manager of Hajduk, he worked under Boro Primorac who was the assistant coach of Arsène Wenger for over 20 years in Arsenal, and later aided Paolo Tramezzani.

In February 2022, he was appointed manager of Croatian second tier-side NK Solin.

On 24 December 2024, Golem joined the coaching staff of Polish club Śląsk Wrocław as an assistant under Ante Šimundža. On 4 November 2026, two days after Šimundža's sacking, Golem became the caretaker manager of the club ahead of their Ekstraklasa match against Piast Gliwice; the match ended in a goalless draw. On 19 November, he was appointed manager until the end of the season, with an option to extend for another year.
