= Szent Gellért Fórum =

Sports venue in Szeged, Hungary

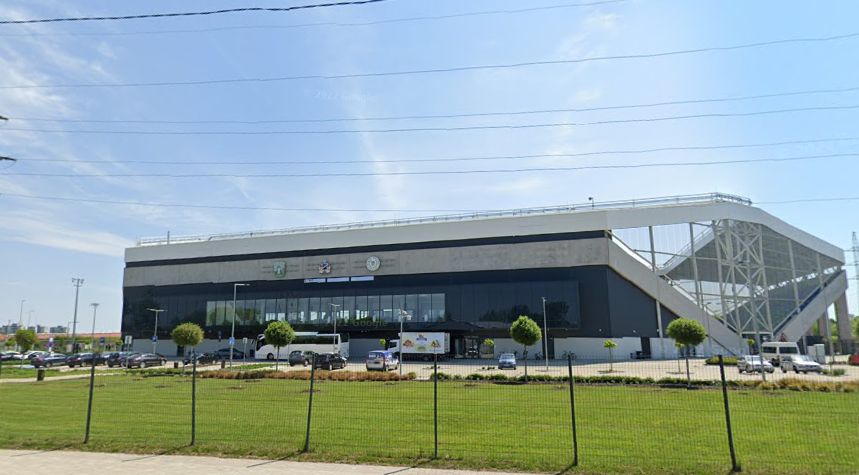
- UEFA
- Interactive map of Szent Gellért Fórum
- Location: Szeged, Hungary
- Coordinates: 46°15′40.9″N 20°7′5.3″E
- Owner: Szeged-Csanád Grosics Akadémia
- Operator: Szeged-Csanád county
- Capacity: 8,256
- Surface: Grass; Field
- Field size: 105 m × 68 m (344 ft × 223 ft)

Construction
- Groundbreaking: 2018
- Built: 2018-19
- Opened: 28 August 2019
- Cost: 13,4 billion HUF

Tenant
- Szeged-Csanád Grosics Akadémia

Website
- szentgellertforum.hu

Szent Gellért Fórum is a sports venue in Szeged, Hungary. The stadium is home to the association football side Szeged-Csanád Grosics Akadémia. The stadium has a capacity of 8,256. Szent Gellért Fórum is a UEFA IV stadium category, therefore UEFA Champions League and UEFA Europa League group games can be played in it.

== History ==
The stadium was opened in three phases. First, on 28 August 2019, Placido Domingo's concert opened the stadium. The Puerto Rican soprano Ana María Martínez and Domingo's father also appeared on stage. On 8 September 2019, the second phase will include a common mass with the members of the Roman Catholic Diocese of Szeged–Csanád, while third phase will include an association football match between the tenant of the Szent Gellért Fórum, Szeged-Csanád Grosics Akadémia and the Italian Serie A-club S.S. Lazio.

== Gallery ==
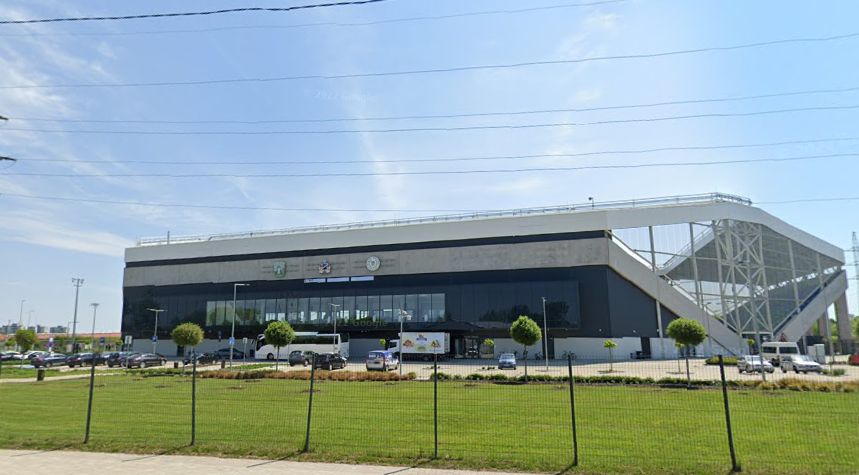

== Milestone matches ==
15 September 2019	Szeged (Hungary)	5–3	(Hungary) Csákvár	First Nemzeti Bajnokság II match
		Report		Referee: Bence Csonka
