= Bence Jagodics =

Hungarian footballer

Personal information
- Date of birth: 31 March 1994 (age 32)
- Place of birth: Szombathely, Hungary
- Height: 1.83 m (6 ft 0 in)
- Position: Centre back

Team information
- Current team: Ajka
- Number: 25

Youth career
- 2003–2005: Gyöngyösfalu
- 2005–2012: Haladás

Senior career*
Years	Team	Apps	(Gls)
2012–2014	Haladás	0	(0)
2014–2015	Pápa	24	(0)
2015–2016	Nyíregyháza	10	(0)
2016	Ajka	9	(0)
2016–2017	Szeged	26	(1)
2017–2019	Balmazújváros	26	(0)
2019–2022	Siófok	78	(6)
2022–	Ajka	72	(2)

International career
2013–2014	Hungary U-20	1	(0)
2014–2015	Hungary U-21	4	(0)
- * Club domestic league appearances and goals as of 10 June 2025

Bence Jagodics (born 31 March 1994) is a Hungarian professional footballer who plays for Ajka.

== Club career ==
On 23 June 2022, Jagodics signed a three-year contract with Ajka.

== Career statistics ==
Appearances and goals by club, season and competition
Club	Season	League			Cup		League Cup		Europe		Total	
Club	Season	Division	Apps	Goals	Apps	Goals	Apps	Goals	Apps	Goals	Apps	Goals
Haladás
Haladás	2012–13	Nemzeti Bajnokság I	0	0	0	0	1	0	0	0	1	0
Haladás	2013–14	Nemzeti Bajnokság I	0	0	0	0	1	0	0	0	1	0
Haladás	Total		0	0	0	0	2	0	0	0	2	0
Pápa
Pápa	2013–14	Nemzeti Bajnokság I	5	0	2	0	3	0	0	0	10	0
Pápa	2014–15	Nemzeti Bajnokság I	19	0	1	0	4	0	0	0	24	0
Pápa	Total		24	0	3	0	7	0	0	0	34	0
Nyíregyháza	2015–16	Nemzeti Bajnokság III	10	0	4	0	0	0	0	0	14	0
Ajka	2015–16	Nemzeti Bajnokság II	9	0	0	0	0	0	0	0	9	0
Szeged
Szeged	2016–17	Nemzeti Bajnokság II	24	1	2	0	0	0	0	0	26	1
Szeged	2017–18	Nemzeti Bajnokság II	2	0	0	0	0	0	0	0	2	0
Szeged	Total		26	1	2	0	0	0	0	0	28	1
Balmazújváros
Balmazújváros	2017–18	Nemzeti Bajnokság I	4	0	6	0	0	0	0	0	10	0
Balmazújváros	2018–19	Nemzeti Bajnokság II	22	0	1	0	0	0	0	0	23	0
Balmazújváros	Total		26	0	7	0	0	0	0	0	33	0
Career total			95	1	16	0	9	0	0	0	120	1

Updated to games played as of 19 May 2019.
