= Norbert Pintér =

Hungarian footballer

Personal information
- Full name: Norbert Pintér
- Date of birth: 3 November 1992 (age 34)
- Place of birth: Senta, SFR Yugoslavia
- Height: 1.67 m (5 ft 6 in)
- Position: Midfielder

Team information
- Current team: Békéscsaba
- Number: 7

Youth career
- –2010: Paks

Senior career*
Years	Team	Apps	(Gls)
2010–2013	Paks II	45	(6)
2013	Paks	0	(0)
2013–2017	Balmazújváros	55	(8)
2016–2017	→ Szolnok (loan)	35	(4)
2017–2018	Szolnok	22	(4)
2018–2019	TSC	13	(4)
2019–2021	FK Csíkszereda	32	(4)
2021–2023	Kaposvári Rákóczi	69	(29)
2023–	Békéscsaba	37	(13)
- * Club domestic league appearances and goals as of 10 June 2025

Norbert Pintér (born 3 November 1992) is a Hungarian footballer who plays for Békéscsaba.

== Career ==
Before, he played with FK TSC having helped them to reach their historical promotion to the Serbian SuperLiga.

== Honours ==
TSC

- Serbian First League: 2017–18
