= Balmazújvárosi Városi Sportpálya =

Hungarian Sports Stadium

Coordinates: 47.611560654824586°N 21.34907073851292°E

Városi Sportpálya
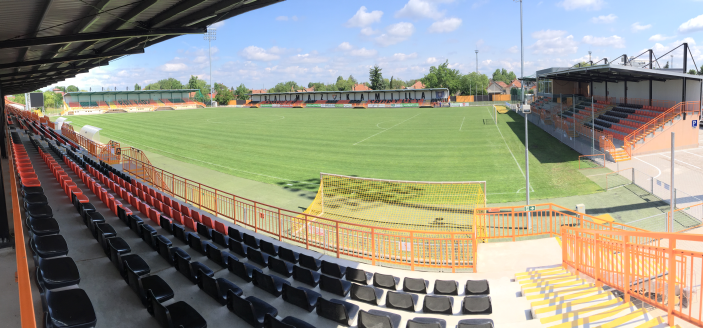
- Interactive map of Városi Sportpálya
- Full name: Balmazújvárosi Városi Sportpálya
- Location: Balmazújváros, Hungary
- Capacity: 2,435
- Surface: Grass; Field
- Record attendance: 3,500 (Balmazújváros 0–3 Vasas); 1974–75 Magyar Kupa quarter-finals
- Field size: 105 m × 68 m (344 ft × 223 ft)

Tenant
- Balmazújvárosi FC

Website
- www.balmazfoci.hu

Balmazújvárosi Városi Sportpálya is a sports stadium in Balmazújváros, Hungary. The stadium is home to association football side Balmazújvárosi FC. The stadium has a capacity of 2,435.

== History ==
On 5 April 2013 Balmazújváros hosted Ferencvárosi TC II in the 2012–13 Nemzeti Bajnokság II season at Oláh Gábor utcai Stadion, Debrecen, due to the reconstruction of their stadium.

During the construction of the new stadium of Nyíregyháza Spartacus FC, the club played their home matches in the stadium.
