= Bachana Arabuli =

Georgian footballer (born 1994)

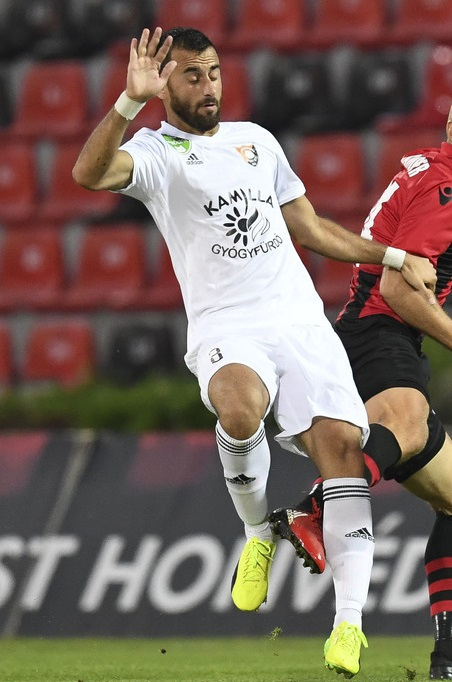
- Arabuli playing for Balmazújváros in 2017

Personal information
- Date of birth: 5 January 1994 (age 32)
- Place of birth: Tbilisi, Georgia
- Height: 1.88 m (6 ft 2 in)
- Position: Striker

Team information
- Current team: FC Telavi
- Number: 32

Youth career
- –2012: Saburtalo

Senior career*
Years	Team	Apps	(Gls)
2013–2015	Saburtalo	0	(0)
2013	→ Dila Gori (loan)	4	(5)
2014	→ Alcorcón B (loan)	8	(3)
2014	→ Dila Gori (loan)	9	(1)
2015	→ Tskhinvali (loan)	4	(0)
2015–2017	Dinamo Tbilisi	38	(13)
2016	→ Samtredia (loan)	14	(7)
2017–2018	Balmazújváros	29	(9)
2018–2019	Puskás Akadémia	22	(5)
2019–2020	Panionios	28	(6)
2020–2022	Lamia	45	(8)
2022–2023	Macarthur	15	(5)
2023–2024	Neftchi Fergana	10	(0)
2024	Gyeongnam	26	(9)
2025	Unirea Slobozia	6	(2)
2025–	FC Telavi	7	(1)

International career
2009–2010	Georgia U17	3	(2)
2012–2013	Georgia U19	9	(3)
2016	Georgia U21	4	(1)
2017–2019	Georgia	7	(0)
- * Club domestic league appearances and goals as of 8 December 2025

Bachana Arabuli (Georgian: ბაჩანა არაბული, romanized: bachana arabuli; born 5 January 1994) is a Georgian professional footballer who plays as a striker for FC Telavi.

== Club career ==
Arabuli made his professional debut for Dila Gori on 30 March 2013 in a match against FC Zugdidi. He has spent six months in Spain where he played for AD Alcorcón's B team in the Tercera Division. He also played for Georgian clubs Tskhinvali, Dinamo Tbilisi and Samtredia and for Hungarian clubs Balmazújváros and Puskás Akadémia.

=== Panionios ===
On 18 July 2019, Arabuli signed a three-year contract with Greek Super League club Panionios, who began the season on −6 points because of financial irregularities. Arabuli scored his first goal for the club in added time in an opening-day defeat at home to newly promoted Volos. He scored a stoppage-time equaliser on 22 September away to Lamia, and on 10 November, he scored both Panionios goals in the team's second win of the campaign, 2–1 away to Xanthi. On 30 November 2019, he scored again in an emphatic 3–0 win against Panetolikos.

=== Lamia ===
On 22 September 2020, he joined Lamia on a free transfer.

=== Macarthur FC ===
On 1 September 2022, Bachana joined Macarthur FC on a free transfer. He made his debut coming off the bench on 13 November 2022, and got the game winning assist against the Central Coast Mariners in the 95th minute. Bachana scored his first A-League goal on 18 December 2022, scoring the winning goal against Perth Glory in the 70th minute of a 1–0 victory.

== International career ==
Arabuli made his debut for the national team in a friendly game against Uzbekistan on 23 January 2017.

== International stats ==
As of match played 19 November 2019

Appearances and goals by national team and year
National team	Year	Apps	Goals
Georgia	2017	3	0
Georgia	2018	3	0
Georgia	2019	1	0
Total		7	0

== Honours ==
Dila Gori

- Georgian Super Cup runner-up: 2012

Dinamo Tbilisi

- Umaglesi Liga: 2015–16
- Georgian Cup: 2015–16
- Georgian Super Cup: 2015

Samtredia

- Umaglesi Liga: 2016

Macarthur

- Australia Cup: 2022
