= Bence Daru =

Hungarian football player

Personal information
- Date of birth: 5 June 1994 (age 32)
- Place of birth: Budapest, Hungary
- Height: 1.95 m (6 ft 5 in)
- Position: Striker

Team information
- Current team: Békéscsaba
- Number: 29

Youth career
- 2002–2003: Viktória
- 2003–2008: Grund
- 2008–2013: Honvéd

Senior career*
Years	Team	Apps	(Gls)
2013–2015	Honvéd II	32	(12)
2013–2014	→ Siófok (loan)	11	(6)
2015–2017	Zalaegerszeg	53	(30)
2017	→ Paks (loan)	4	(0)
2017–2018	Paks	9	(1)
2018	→ Győri ETO (loan)	8	(1)
2018–2019	Nyíregyháza Spartacus	15	(2)
2019–2021	Csákvár	54	(21)
2021–2024	Szeged-Csanád	15	(1)
2023	→ Kozármisleny (loan)	10	(4)
2024	Kozármisleny	20	(4)
2024–2025	Pécs	21	(11)
2025–	Békéscsaba	18	(1)
- * Club domestic league appearances and goals as of 31 May 2026

Bence Daru (born 5 June 1994) is a Hungarian football player who plays for Békéscsaba.

== Career ==
On 22 December 2022, Daru was loaned to Kozármisleny. He scored twice in the 2022–23 Nemzeti Bajnokság II relegation play-offs decisive game to keep the club in the league.

In January 2024, Daru returned to Kozármisleny on a permanent basis.

== Career statistics ==
Appearances and goals by club, season and competition
Club	Season	League			Cup		League Cup		Europe		Total	
Club	Season	Division	Apps	Goals	Apps	Goals	Apps	Goals	Apps	Goals	Apps	Goals
Honvéd II
Honvéd II	2012–13	Nemzeti Bajnokság II	9	2	0	0	—		—		9	2
Honvéd II	2013–14	Nemzeti Bajnokság III	23	10	0	0	—		—		23	10
Honvéd II	Total		32	12	0	0	0	0	0	0	32	12
Siófok	2014–15	Nemzeti Bajnokság II	11	6	1	1	2	0	—		14	7
Zalaegerszeg
Zalaegerszeg	2014–15	Nemzeti Bajnokság II	13	5	0	0	0	0	—		13	5
Zalaegerszeg	2015–16	Nemzeti Bajnokság II	26	22	3	1	—		—		29	23
Zalaegerszeg	2016–17	Nemzeti Bajnokság II	14	3	1	0	—		—		15	3
Zalaegerszeg	Total		53	30	4	1	0	0	0	0	57	31
Paks
Paks	2016–17	Nemzeti Bajnokság I	4	0	0	0	—		—		4	0
Paks	2017–18	Nemzeti Bajnokság I	9	1	1	1	—		—		10	2
Paks	Total		13	1	1	1	0	0	0	0	14	2
Career total			109	49	6	3	2	0	0	0	117	52

Updated to games played as of 9 December 2017.
