= Lasha Shindagoridze =

Georgian footballer (born 1993)

Personal information
- Date of birth: 30 January 1993 (age 33)
- Place of birth: Tbilisi, Georgia
- Height: 1.89 m (6 ft 2 in)
- Position: Midfielder

Youth career
- 2011–2012: Aarhus
- 2012: Dukla Prague
- 2012–2013: Zestaponi

Senior career*
Years	Team	Apps	(Gls)
2012–2014	Dinamo Tbilisi II	15	(6)
2013–2014	Dinamo Tbilisi	1	(0)
2014–2015	Tskhinvali	28	(8)
2015–2016	Torpedo Kutaisi	24	(7)
2016	Sioni Bolnisi	3	(0)
2016	Tskhinvali	9	(0)
2017	Saburtalo	36	(9)
2018	Balmazújváros	5	(0)
2018–2019	Saburtalo	22	(10)
2019–2020	Shakhtyor Soligorsk	13	(2)
2021	Dinamo Batumi	23	(2)
2022	Saburtalo	13	(1)
- * Club domestic league appearances and goals as of 31 May 2022

Lasha Shindagoridze (born 20 January 1993) is a Georgian former football player.

== Club career ==
On 3 March 2018 he was signed by Nemzeti Bajnokság I club Balmazújvárosi FC.

== Club statistics ==
Club	Season	League		Cup		Europe		Total	
Club	Season	Apps	Goals	Apps	Goals	Apps	Goals	Apps	Goals
Balmazújváros
Balmazújváros	2017–18	5	0	4	1	–	–	9	1
Balmazújváros	Total	5	0	4	1	–	–	9	1
Career Total		5	0	4	1	0	0	9	1

Updated to games played as of 7 April 2018.
