= Ervin Zsiga =

Romanian footballer (born 1991)

Personal information
- Date of birth: 11 July 1991 (age 35)
- Place of birth: Satu Mare, Romania
- Height: 1.79 m (5 ft 10 in)
- Position: Winger

Youth career
- –2007: Olimpia Satu Mare

Senior career*
| Years | Team | Apps | (Gls) |
| 2007–2009 | Olimpia Satu Mare | 10 | (1) |
| 2009 | Turul Micula | 14 | (4) |
| 2010–2011 | Someşul Oar | | |
| 2011–2012 | Olimpia Satu Mare | 30 | (15) |
| 2012–2013 | Vaslui | 1 | (0) |
| 2013–2015 | Fortuna Poiana Câmpina | 11 | (2) |
| 2013–2014 | → Olimpia Satu Mare (loan) | 17 | (2) |
| 2015–2018 | Balmazújváros | 58 | (11) |
| 2018–2020 | Kaposvár | 27 | (1) |
| 2020–2026 | CSM Olimpia Satu Mare | 99 | (2) |
| Total | | 267 | (38) |
- * Club domestic league appearances and goals as of 9 May 2026

Ervin Zsiga (born 11 July 1991) is a Romanian former professional footballer who played as a winger.

== Honours ==
Turul Micula

- Liga IV – Satu Mare County: 2008–09
