= Yuriy Habovda =

Ukrainian footballer (born 1989)

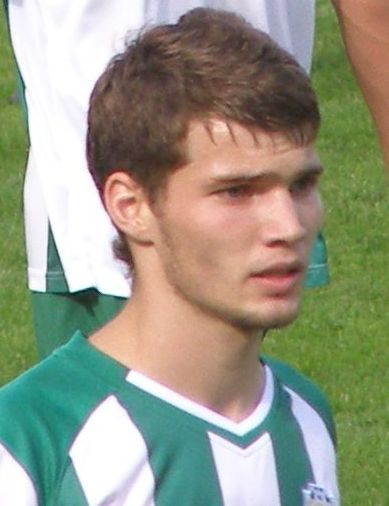

Personal information
- Full name: Yuriy Viktorovych Habovda
- Date of birth: 6 May 1989 (age 37)
- Place of birth: Mukachevo, Zakarpattia Oblast, Ukrainian SSR, Soviet Union
- Height: 1.79 m (5 ft 10 in)
- Position: Midfielder

Youth career
- 2002–2004: Sokolyata Mukachevo
- 2004–2006: UFK Lviv

Senior career*
Years	Team	Apps	(Gls)
2006–2011	Karpaty Lviv	7	(0)
2006–2008	→ Karpaty-2 Lviv	35	(1)
2011–2012	Kryvbas Kryvyi Rih	2	(0)
2012–2014	Tavriya Simferopol	29	(0)
2014	Karpaty Lviv	2	(0)
2015	Granit Mikashevichi	24	(5)
2016	Dinamo Minsk	25	(3)
2017	Rukh Vynnyky	13	(3)
2017–2018	Balmazújváros	29	(0)
2018–2019	Haladás	40	(1)
2020	Debrecen	6	(0)
2020–2021	Torpedo-BelAZ Zhodino	31	(11)
2022	Dukla Prague	8	(0)
2022–2023	Sokol Hostouň	21	(2)
- * Club domestic league appearances and goals as of 30 June 2023

Yuriy Habovda (Ukrainian: Юрій Вікторович Габовда; born 6 May 1989) is a Ukrainian former professional football midfielder.

== Career ==
Habovda made his debut for FC Karpaty Lviv entering as a second-half substitute against FC Dynamo Kyiv on 24 April 2010 in Ukrainian Premier League.
