= Ante Batarelo =

Croatian footballer

Personal information
- Date of birth: 21 November 1984 (age 41)
- Place of birth: Split, SFR Yugoslavia
- Height: 1.74 m (5 ft 9 in)
- Position: Midfielder

Youth career
- 1990–2000: Hajduk Split
- 2000–2002: Solin
- 2003: Inter Zaprešić

Senior career*
Years	Team	Apps	(Gls)
2003–2005	Inter Zaprešić	2	(0)
2004	→ Hrvatski Dragovoljac (loan)	14	(4)
2005	→ Hrvatski Dragovoljac (loan)	26	(3)
2006	Hrvatski Dragovoljac	11	(0)
2007	Moslavina	12	(2)
2007–2008	Hrvatski Dragovoljac	27	(5)
2008–2010	Inter Zaprešić	51	(3)
2010–2011	Karlovac	29	(2)
2011–2012	Istra 1961	18	(0)
2012–2013	Slaven Belupo	18	(1)
2013–2014	Istra 1961	31	(2)
2014	Hrvatski Dragovoljac	14	(2)
2015	Balmazújváros	13	(3)
2015–2016	Haladás	6	(0)
2016–2017	Solin	27	(1)
2017–2018	Balmazújváros	15	(1)
2018–2019	Lučko	13	(0)
2020	Moslavina		
- * Club domestic league appearances and goals as of 4 June 2022

Ante Batarelo (born 21 November 1984 in Split) is a Croatian footballer currently who played as a midfielder for NK Lucko.
