= Zoltán Harsányi =

Slovak footballer

Personal information
- Date of birth: 1 June 1987 (age 39)
- Place of birth: Senec, Czechoslovakia
- Height: 1.90 m (6 ft 3 in)
- Position: Forward

Team information
- Current team: OFK Rapid Ohrady

Youth career
- –2002: Dunajská Streda
- 2002–2006: Senec

Senior career*
| Years | Team | Apps | (Gls) |
| 2006 | Senec | 11 | (5) |
| 2007–2010 | Bolton Wanderers | 0 | (0) |
| 2010–2012 | Dunajská Streda | 24 | (3) |
| 2010–2011 | → Paykan (loan) | 7 | (1) |
| 2012–2013 | Pécsi MFC | 3 | (0) |
| 2012–2013 | → Myjava (loan) | 20 | (4) |
| 2013–2016 | Mezőkövesd | 22 | (5) |
| 2014–2015 | → Puskás (loan) | 18 | (0) |
| 2016–2017 | Nyíregyháza | 28 | (11) |
| 2018–2019 | Balmazújváros | 8 | (0) |
| 2019 | Ajka | 5 | (0) |
| 2019–2021 | Lipót SK | 9 | (4) |
| 2021-2022 | Tiszafüredi VSE | 0 | (0) |
| 2021-2022 | OK Castkovce | 0 | (0) |
| 2022-2023 | Tomasikovo | 0 | (0) |
| 2023- | OFK Rapid Ohrady | 0 | (0) |

International career
| 2007–2008 | Slovakia U-21 | 12 | (9) |
- * Club domestic league appearances and goals as of 22:20, 6 February 2020 (UTC)

Zoltán Harsányi (born 1 June 1987) is a Slovak footballer who plays for OFK Rapid Ohrady.

== Club career ==
Harsányi is a striker and has represented Slovakia at under 18 and under 20 level. He initially signed for Bolton on loan from Slovak side FC Senec until the end of the 2006/2007 season. Bolton had the option to make the deal permanent at the end of the season. On 17 May 2007, Bolton boss Sammy Lee signed Harsányi on a three-year permanent deal after a successful spell in the reserves netting three goals in seven outings. Harsányi came to the club with Ľubomír Michalík. During the summer of 2007, after an Under 21s game against England, Harsanyi caught the attention of many football fans after scoring a very cheeky penalty by chipping the ball over the head of Manchester City goalkeeper Joe Hart.

On the 11 May 2010, it was announced that Harsányi had been released by Bolton Wanderers without making an appearance for the first team. In July 2010 Harsány went on trial at NEC Nijmegen in the Netherlands but wasn't offered a contract.

Following his release from Bolton, Harsányi returned to his native Slovakia on a six-month contract with Dunajská Streda.
