= Bence Tóth (footballer, born 1998) =

Hungarian footballer

Personal information
- Date of birth: 25 May 1998 (age 28)
- Place of birth: Tapolca, Hungary
- Height: 1.89 m (6 ft 2 in)
- Position: Centre back

Team information
- Current team: Szeged-Csanád
- Number: 55

Youth career
- 2005–2014: Veszprém
- 2012–2014: → Győr (loan)
- 2014–2016: Puskás Akadémia

Senior career*
Years	Team	Apps	(Gls)
2016–2017	Puskás Akadémia	23	(2)
2017–2019	MOL Vidi	6	(0)
2019	→ Vasas (loan)	17	(0)
2019–2022	Vasas	34	(1)
2021–2022	→ Szolnok (loan)	29	(1)
2022–	Szeged-Csanád	105	(0)

International career^{‡}
2014–2015	Hungary U17	6	(0)
2016	Hungary U18	2	(0)
2016–2017	Hungary U19	10	(2)
2017–2019	Hungary U21	14	(0)
2017–	Hungary	1	(0)
- * Club domestic league appearances and goals as of 31 May 2026 ‡ National team caps and goals as of 17:26, 30 November 2019 (UTC)

Bence Tóth (born 25 May 1998) is a Hungarian professional footballer who plays for Szeged-Csanád.

== Career ==
=== Early years ===
He made his professional debut in the 2016–17 campaign, with the Puskás Akadémia in the second division against Sopron on 19 August 2016.

=== Club career ===
On 31 January 2019, MOL Vidi FC announced that they had loaned out Tóth to Vasas SC for the rest of the season.

On 16 June 2022, Tóth signed with Szeged-Csanád.

=== International career ===
He received his first call up to the senior Hungary squad for the friendly match against Russia and 2018 FIFA World Cup qualification against Andorra in June 2017 and he played his first match in the national team on 9 June against Andorra.

== Career statistics ==
Appearances and goals by club, season and competition
Club	Season	League			Cup		Europe		Total	
Club	Season	Division	Apps	Goals	Apps	Goals	Apps	Goals	Apps	Goals
Puskás Akadémia	2016–17	Nemzeti Bajnokság II	23	2	2	0	—		25	2
MOL Vidi
MOL Vidi	2017–18	Nemzeti Bajnokság I	6	0	3	0	0	0	9	0
MOL Vidi	2018–19	Nemzeti Bajnokság I	0	0	2	0	0	0	2	0
MOL Vidi	Total		6	0	5	0	0	0	11	0
Career total			29	2	7	0	0	0	36	2

Updated to games played as of 16 December 2018.
