= Ádám Orovecz =

Hungarian footballer

Personal information
- Full name: Ádám Orovecz
- Date of birth: 23 October 1997 (age 29)
- Place of birth: Hódmezővásárhely, Hungary
- Height: 1.69 m (5 ft 7 in)
- Position: Midfielder

Team information
- Current team: Balmazújváros
- Number: 71

Youth career
- 2007–2013: Hódmezővásárhely
- 2013–2014: Szombathelyi Haladás
- 2014–2016: Békéscsaba
- 2016–2017: Gyirmót

Senior career*
Years	Team	Apps	(Gls)
2017–	Balmazújváros	2	(0)
- * Club domestic league appearances and goals as of 18 November 2017

Ádám Orovecz (born 23 October 1997) is a Hungarian football who currently plays for Balmazújvárosi FC.

== Club career ==
On 4 November 2017, he was signed by Nemzeti Bajnokság I club Balmazújvárosi FC.

== Career statistics ==
As of match played 18 November 2017

Club	Season	League			Cup		Europe		Total	
Club	Season	Division	Apps	Goals	Apps	Goals	Apps	Goals	Apps	Goals
Balmazújváros	2017–18	Nemzeti Bajnokság I	2	0	2	0	—		4	0
Career total			2	0	2	0	0	0	4	0
