= 2015–16 Nemzeti Bajnokság II =

Nemzeti Bajnokság II
- Season: 2015–16
- Champions: Gyírmót
- Promoted: Gyírmót; Mezőkövesd
- Relegated: Szigetszentmiklós; Dunaújváros PASE; Ajka
- Top goalscorer: Bence Daru (22 goals)
- All statistics correct as of 21 January 2017.

The 2015–2016 Nemzeti Bajnokság II was the 116th season of the Nemzeti Bajnokság II, the second tier of the Hungarian football league.

The championship was won by Gyirmót FC Győr and they were also promoted to the 2016–17 Nemzeti Bajnokság I along with Mezőkövesd-Zsóry SE. Three teams including Szigetszentmiklósi TK, Dunaújváros PASE, and FC Ajka were relegated to the 2016–17 Nemzeti Bajnokság III.

== Teams ==
At the end of 2014–15 season, Vasas and Békéscsaba promoted to Nemzeti Bajnokság I.

Two teams were relegated to Nemzeti Bajnokság III : Cegléd and Kaposvári Rákóczi.

The winners of the three 2014–15 Nemzeti Bajnokság III series were promoted to NB III: Budaörs, Vác and Várda.

=== Stadium and locations ===
Location of teams in 2015-16 Nemzeti Bajnokság II

Following is the list of clubs competing in 2015–16 Nemzeti Bajnokság II, with their location, stadium and stadium capacity.

Team	Location	Stadium	Capacity
FC Ajka	Ajka	Ajkai Városi Szabadidő- és Sportcentrum	5,000
Balmazújvárosi FC	Balmazújváros	Batthyány utcai Sportpálya	2,300
Budaörsi SC	Budaörs	Árok utcai pálya	1,200
Csákvári TK	Csákvár	Tersztyánszky Ödön Sportközpont	2,020
Dunaújváros PASE	Dunaújváros	Dunaferr Arena	12,000
Gyirmót SE	Győr	Ménfői út	4,000
Mezőkövesd-Zsóry SE	Mezőkövesd	Mezőkövesdi Városi Stadion	5,000
BFC Siófok	Siófok	Révész Street Stadium	6,500
Soproni VSE	Sopron	Stadion Városi	4,500
Soroksár SC	Budapest	Szamosi Mihály Sporttelep	5,000
Szeged 2011	Gyula	Grosics Akadémia Centerpálya	1,500
Szigetszentmiklósi TK	Szigetszentmiklós	Stadium Sport Street	1,200
Szolnoki MÁV FC	Szolnok	Tiszaligeti Stadion	4,000
Vác FC	Vác	Stadion Városi Vác	12,000
Várda SE	Kisvárda	Várkert Sportpálya	2,000
Zalaegerszegi TE	Zalaegerszeg	ZTE Arena	9,300

=== Personnel and kits ===
Following is the list of clubs competing in 2015–16 Nemzeti Bajnokság II, with their manager, captain, kit manufacturer and shirt sponsor.

Team	Manager	Captain	Kit manufacturer	Shirt sponsor
Ajka	(Hungary) Péter Jákli	(Hungary) Gergő Pákai	Legea	Polus Coop Zrt.
Balmazújváros	(Hungary) Tamás Feczkó	(Hungary) Pál Szalma	Nike	Dantnova Kft.
Budaörs	(Hungary) Attila Miskei		adidas	
Csákvár	(Hungary) Gábor Toldi	(Hungary) Attila Domján	adidas	Aqvital
Dunaújváros	(Hungary) Tamás Artner		Nike	
Gyirmót	(Hungary) Ferenc Bene jr.	(Hungary) Zoltán Balog	Jako	Alcufer
Mezőkövesd	(Hungary) László Tóth	(Hungary) Péter Takács	Legea	Zsóry
Siófok	(Serbia) Goran Kopunović	(Hungary) Norbert Tajti	Puma	AVE
Sopron	(Hungary) Attila Supka	(Hungary) András Horváth	Nike	–
Soroksár	(Hungary) Tamás Lucsánszky	(Hungary) Péter Pandur	Jako	Banetti
Szeged	(Hungary) László Klausz	(Hungary) Péter Máté	Puma	Pick
Szigetszentmiklós	(Hungary) Attila Vágó	(Hungary) Zoltán Pollák	Erima	Strabag
Szolnok	(Hungary) József Csábi	(Hungary) Krisztián Mile	hummel	Szolnok
Vác	(Hungary) Tibor Nagy		Joma	
Várda	(Hungary) Imre Soós		adidas	Master Good
Zalaegerszeg	(Hungary) János Csank	(Hungary) Gábor Simonfalvi	mass	Pharos

== League table ==
Pos	Team	Pld	W	D	L	GF	GA	GD	Pts	Promotion or relegation
1	Gyirmót (P)	30	20	5	5	58	28	+30	65	Promotion to Nemzeti Bajnokság I
2	Mezőkövesd (P)	30	17	6	7	45	25	+20	57	Promotion to Nemzeti Bajnokság I
3	Zalaegerszeg	30	17	4	9	55	30	+25	55	
4	Várda	30	15	7	8	63	36	+27	52	
5	Balmazújváros	30	15	6	9	46	39	+7	51	
6	Csákvár	30	15	3	12	55	55	0	48	
7	Soroksár	30	13	8	9	45	29	+16	47	
8	Budaörs	30	13	4	13	45	43	+2	43	
9	Siófok	30	12	5	13	36	47	−11	41	
10	Szeged 2011	30	11	7	12	42	40	+2	40	
11	Vác	30	10	3	17	32	51	−19	33	
12	Soproni VSE	30	9	6	15	38	42	−4	33	
13	Szolnoki MÁV	30	7	10	13	34	41	−7	31	
14	Szigetszentmiklós (R)	30	6	9	15	31	61	−30	27	Relegation to Nemzeti Bajnokság III
15	Dunaújváros PASE (R)	30	6	9	15	32	63	−31	27	Relegation to Nemzeti Bajnokság III
16	Ajka (R)	30	4	8	18	24	51	−27	20	Relegation to Nemzeti Bajnokság III

Source: mlsz.hu (in Hungarian)
Rules for classification: 1st points; 2nd overall wins; 3rd goal difference; 4th head-to-head points; 5th head-to-head goal difference; 6th head-to-head away goals scored; 7th fair-play points; 8th drawing of lots
(P) Promoted; (R) Relegated

== Results ==
Home \ Away	AJK	BAL	BUD	CSÁ	DUN	GYI	MEZ	SIÓ	SOP	SOR	SZE	SZI	SZL	VÁC	VÁR	ZTE
Ajka		1–1	1–0	0–1	0–6	0–3		2–1	3–1	0–0	5–0					1–2
Balmazújváros				4–1	3–1		1–1		2–1	1–1	0–1	4–1		1–0		
Budaörs		1–1		1–0	1–1	4–1		1–0	3–2	2–1	1–3	2–0				1–5
Csákvár							1–3			4–1	3–2	2–3	2–1	2–1		3–2
Dunaújváros				1–0			1–1		2–1	1–1	1–0	0–0				
Gyirmót		1–0		1–0	2–0				2–1		2–1					1–1
Mezőkövesd-Zsóry	2–2		0–2			1–2		0–3					3–1	2–1	0–1	2–0
Siófok		0–0		3–1	4–2	0–4			0–2		1–2		0–0	2–0		1–0
Sopron				4–1			0–0			1–0	3–1	0–1		1–0		1–2
Soroksár						0–3	1–3	1–1				4–0	0–2	2–1	0–0	0–0
Szeged						0–0	0–1			1–0		3–2	4–1	1–1		2–0
Szigetszentmiklós	2–0					2–2	2–2	3–3					2–3	1–1	2–1	1–1
Szolnok	2–0	3–0	2–3		1–1	1–0			1–3						4–2	
Vác	2–1		1–0		1–2	0–1							1–0		1–1	1–4
Várda	0–0	5–0	4–2	3–4	2–2	0–1		2–0	3–2		4–0					1–2
Zalaegerszegi TE		2–0	2–0		4–0								1–0			

Updated to match(es) played on 28 February 2016. Source: mlsz.hu (in Hungarian)
Legend: Blue = home team win; Yellow = draw; Red = away team win.

== Season statistics ==
=== Top goalscorers ===
Rank	Player	Club	Goals
1	(Hungary) Bence Daru	Zalaegerszegi TE	11
1	(Hungary) Zsolt Gajdos	Szolnok	11
3	(Hungary) Gábor Erős	Várda	10
4	(Hungary) János Máté	Mezőkövesd	9
5	(Hungary) Attila Simon	Gyirmót	7
5	(Hungary) Tamás Germán	Szeged	7
5	(Hungary) Richárd Balázs	Szigetszentmiklós	7
5	(Hungary) Balázs Zamostny	Sopron	7
9	(Hungary) Gellért Ivancsics	Siófok	6
9	(Hungary) Máté Papp	Budaörs	6

Updated to games played on 30 November 2015

== Number of teams by counties ==
	County (megye)	No. teams	Teams
1	Pest	3	Budaörs, Szigetszentmiklós and Vác
2	Fejér	2	Csákvár and Dunaújváros
2	Győr-Moson-Sopron	2	Gyirmót and Soproni VSE
4	Borsod-Abaúj-Zemplén	1	Mezőkövesd-Zsóry
4	Budapest	1	Soroksár
4	Csongrád	1	Szeged 2011
4	Hajdú-Bihar	1	Balmazújváros
4	Jász-Nagykun-Szolnok	1	Szolnoki MÁV
4	Somogy	1	Siófok
4	Szabolcs-Szatmár-Bereg	1	Várda
4	Veszprém	1	Ajka
4	Zala	1	Zalaegerszegi TE

== See also ==
- 2015–16 Magyar Kupa
- 2015–16 Nemzeti Bajnokság I
- 2015–16 Nemzeti Bajnokság III
