= György Kamarás =

Hungarian footballer

Personal information
- Date of birth: 17 March 1998 (age 28)
- Place of birth: Budapest, Hungary
- Height: 1.85 m (6 ft 1 in)
- Position: Forward

Team information
- Current team: Nafta

Youth career
- 2009–2012: Vasas
- 2012–2015: Puskás Akadémia

Senior career*
Years	Team	Apps	(Gls)
2015–2016	Budapest Honvéd II	3	(0)
2016–2019	Balmazújváros	23	(0)
2017–2018	→ Dorog (loan)	18	(2)
2019	Gyirmót	14	(1)
2019–	Nafta	7	(0)

International career
2016–2017	Hungary U-19	9	(1)
- * Club domestic league appearances and goals as of 19:53, 23 February 2020 (UTC)

György Kamarás (born 17 March 1998) is a Hungarian footballer who currently plays for NK Nafta 1903.

== Club career ==
On 10 March 2018 he was signed by Nemzeti Bajnokság I club Balmazújvárosi FC.

== Career statistics ==
Appearances and goals by club, season and competition
Club	Season	League			Cup		Europe		Total	
Club	Season	Division	Apps	Goals	Apps	Goals	Apps	Goals	Apps	Goals
Budapest Honvéd II	2015–16	Nemzeti Bajnokság III	3	0	0	0	—		3	0
Dorog	2017–18	Nemzeti Bajnokság II	18	2	3	1	—		21	3
Balmazújváros
Balmazújváros	2016–17	Nemzeti Bajnokság II	8	0	1	0	—		9	0
Balmazújváros	2017–18	Nemzeti Bajnokság I	6	0	0	0	—		6	0
Balmazújváros	2018–19	Nemzeti Bajnokság II	9	0	1	0	—		10	0
Balmazújváros	Total		23	0	2	0	—		25	0
Career total			44	2	5	1	0	0	49	3

Updated to games played as of 16 December 2018.
