= Balmazújváros =

- Town
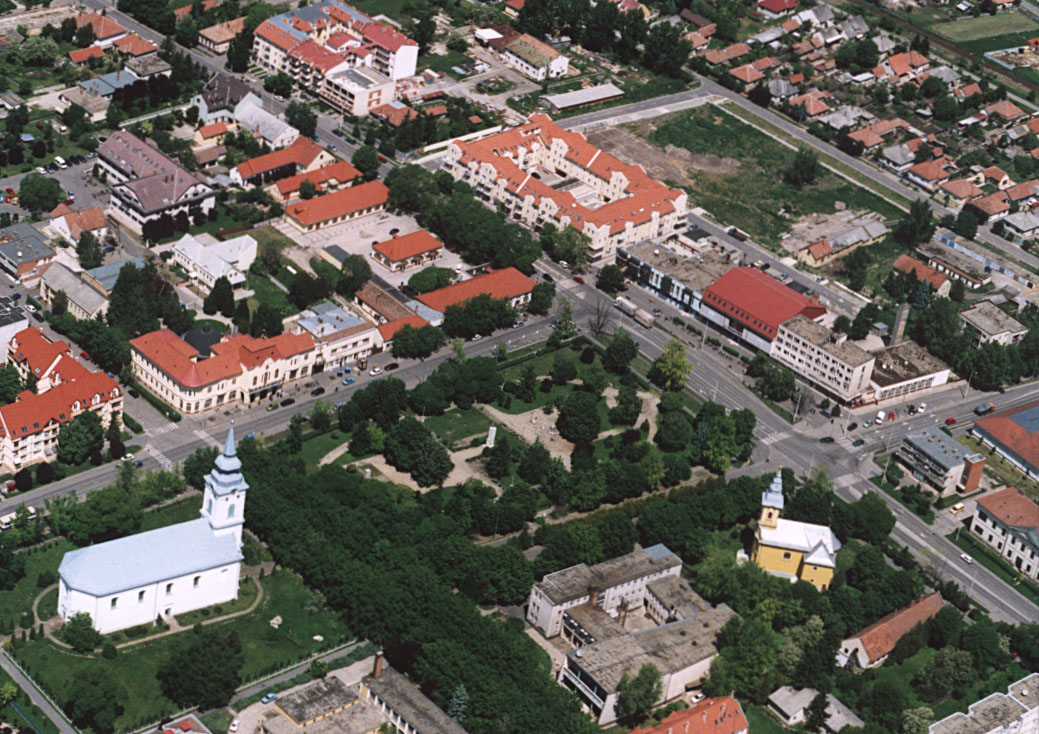
- Aerial view

- Flag Coat of arms

- Location within Hungary
- Coordinates: 47°37′N 21°21′E
- Country: Hungary
- County: Hajdú-Bihar
- District: Balmazújváros

Area
  - Total: 205.45 km^{2} (79.32 sq mi)

Population (2001)
  - Total: 18,149
  - Density: 88.34/km^{2} (228.8/sq mi)
- Time zone: UTC+1 (CET)
  - Summer (DST): UTC+2 (CEST)
- Postal code: 4060
- Area code: (+36) 52
- Website: www.balmazujvaros.hu

Balmazújváros (Hungarian pronunciation: [ˈbɒlmɒzuːjvaːroʃ]) is a town in Hajdú-Bihar county, in the Northern Great Plain region of eastern Hungary.

== Geography ==
It covers an area of 205.45 km^{2} (79 sq mi) and has a population of 18,149 people (2001).

== Twin towns – sister cities ==
Balmazújváros is twinned with:

- Łańcut, Poland (2002)
- Valea lui Mihai (Érmihályfalva), Romania (2008)
- Gulbene, Latvia (2012)
- Tiachiv (Técső), Ukraine (2015)

== Government ==
General Council
- General Council

Type
- Type: Unicameral

History
- Founded: 1911

Leadership
- Mayor: Hegedűs Péter since 2019

Structure
- Seats: 11 Delegate
- House political groups: Government: Célbakísér Civil Szövetség (7); Opposition: Fidesz (3); Independent (1)

Meeting place
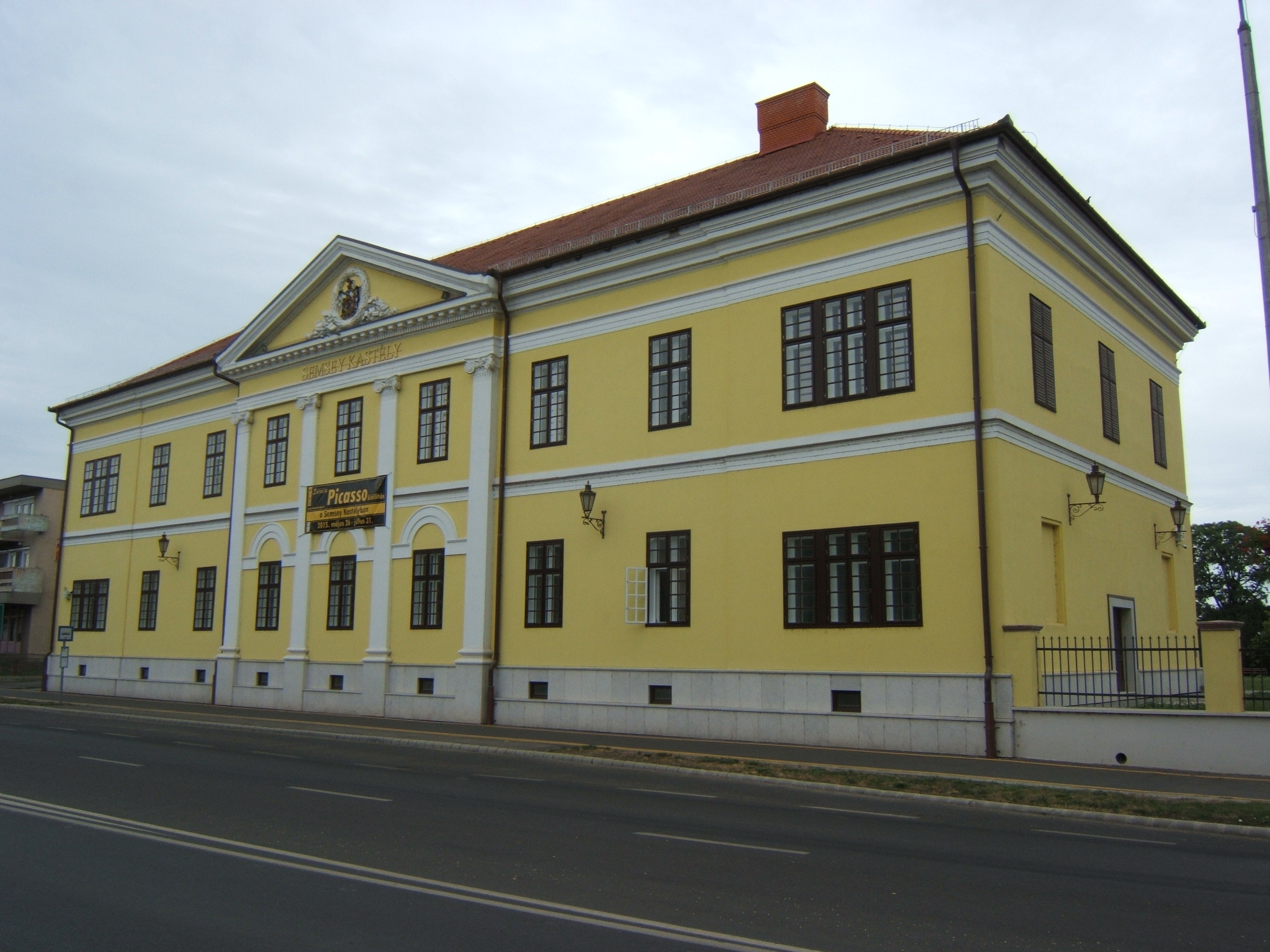
- Meeting house.
