= Szeged-Csanád Grosics Akadémia =

Hungarian football club

Szeged-Csanád
- Full name: Szeged-Csanád Grosics Akadémia
- Founded: 2011; 15 years ago
- Ground: Szent Gellért Fórum
- Capacity: 8,256
- Chairman: Adem Kapič
- Manager: Aleksandar Jović
- League: NB II
- 2025–26: NB II, 9th of 16
- Website: www.szeged-grosicsakademia.hu
Home colours	Away colours

Szeged-Csanád Grosics Akadémia is a Hungarian football club located in Szeged, Hungary. The team's colors are black and blue and they play their home matches at the Szent Gellért Fórum. The club, owned by the Roman Catholic Diocese of Szeged–Csanád, was named after the legendary Hungarian goalkeeper Gyula Grosics.

== Name changes ==
- 2011–2019: Szeged 2011
- 2019–present: Szeged-Csanád Grosics Akadémia

== History ==
SzCsGA respects the traditions and history of soccer in Szeged, but it is not the legal successor to the former Szeged teams such as Szegedi AK, Szegedi Dózsa SC, or SZEOL SC. Szeged-Csanád Grosics Akadémia was founded in 2011, as Szeged 2011, as a symbol of a new direction and stable operation—something that had not been characteristic of soccer in Szeged in the preceding period.

The Sports Organization is wholly owned by the Diocese of Szeged-Csanád, as is the Gyula-based Grosics Academy Football Club, which works in close professional collaboration with it and is an independent youth development association. The founder of the sports organization is László Kiss-Rigó, Bishop of the Diocese of Szeged-Csanád, whose creed is “Strength, Love, Sobriety”—which is also the club’s motto and appears on the coat of arms. Initially, Szeged 2011 Kft. had only an adult team, while the Grosics Academy in Gyula—which has been operating since 2009—focused solely on youth development.

Since the summer of 2012, Szeged-Csanád Grosics Akadémia have been building and fielding our own youth teams in Szeged to meet the requirements for competing in the league.

Szeged-Csanád Grosics Akadémia competed in the second division of the national league, Nemzeti Bajnokság II, from 2011 to 2013, when the Hungarian Football Federation (MLSZ) merged the previously two-group second-division league, and we lost the promotion playoff match against Kisvárda, so we continued in the third division.

The city of Szeged’s soccer infrastructure was inadequate; in particular, the sports complexes and arenas were all outdated and obsolete. It had long been a dream to build a high-quality stadium and sports complex that would meet the demands of modern soccer.

On a weekly basis, renting 3–4 different sports facilities—each in worse and worse condition and located far apart—used by the adult team, as well as traveling between them, had become a burden. Thus, in the summer of 2013, the club’s management made the painful decision to move the adult team out of Szeged and relocate it to the modern Grosics Academy in Gyula—which met all their needs—until the stadium in Szeged, which had since been given the green light, was completed.

From 2014 to 2018, the senior team competed in the second division, and after one year in the third division, we returned to NB II.

=== A New Stadium, a New Era ===
In 2019, a new era began in many respects—not only for the club, but also in the history of soccer in Szeged and the region. The senior team advanced to the second division as group winners in NB III and began competing in the Merkantil Bank League in the summer of 2019 under the name Szeged-Csanád Grosics Academy, while still based in Gyula.

In September, however, both the senior team and the youth teams took possession of the Szent Gellért Fórum in Szeged, built by Market Zrt., which, in addition to a UEFA Category 4-certified main field and stadium capable of accommodating more than 8,000 people, three practice fields, and an indoor sports hall the size of a handball court.

On 28 August 2019, the club's new stadium, Szent Gellért Fórum, was opened with Placido Domingo's concert.

The team played its first adult league match against Csákvári TK on September 15, 2019, and had a 5–3 victory.

== Honours ==
- Nemzeti Bajnokság III:
  - Winners (1): 2018–19

== Current squad ==
As of 20 January 2026

Note: Flags indicate national team as defined under FIFA eligibility rules; some limited exceptions apply. Players may hold more than one non-FIFA nationality.

No.	Pos.	Nation	Player
3	DF	HUN	Márton Sándor
4	DF	HUN	Zoltán Szilágyi
7	FW	BIH	Asmir Suljić
8	MF	SRB	Vanja Zvekanov
10	MF	HUN	Dávid Holman
11	FW	HUN	Kristóf Tóth-Gábor
12	GK	HUN	Tamás Molnár-Farkas (captain)
13	MF	HUN	Richárd Rabatin
14	DF	HUN	Ákos Szabó
16	MF	HUN	Levente Vágó
18	MF	HUN	Domonkos Miskolczi
19	FW	HUN	Csanád Novák
20	DF	HUN	Milán Horváth

No.	Pos.	Nation	Player
23	FW	HUN	Áron Borvető
32	DF	UKR	Mykhaylo Ryashko
33	DF	HUN	Olivér Kalmár
51	GK	HUN	Ákos Onódi
55	DF	HUN	Bence Tóth
67	DF	HUN	László Sztankó
68	FW	HUN	Ádám Halmai
70	FW	HUN	Levente Kurdics
77	FW	HUN	Ákos Kun (on loan from Nyíregyháza)
80	MF	HUN	Balázs Bodnár
88	MF	HUN	Dávid Márkvárt
99	GK	HUN	Dániel Veszelinov

=== Out on loan ===
Note: Flags indicate national team as defined under FIFA eligibility rules; some limited exceptions apply. Players may hold more than one non-FIFA nationality.

No.	Pos.	Nation	Player
—	FW	HUN	Dániel Pruska (at Haladás until 30 June 2026)

== Seasons ==
The table below shows the seasons of Szeged-Csanád Grosics Akadémia.

Season	Tier	Club's name	Position	Pts
2011–12	2	Szeged 2011	12 / 16	37
2012–13	2	Szeged 2011	7 / 16	42
2013–14	3	Szeged 2011-Grosics Akadémia	2 / 16	67
2014–15	2	Szeged 2011-Grosics Akadémia	7 / 16	45
2015–16	2	Szeged 2011-Grosics Akadémia	10 / 16	40
2016–17	2	Szeged 2011-Grosics Akadémia	11 / 20	51
2017–18	2	Szeged 2011-Grosics Akadémia	19 / 20	41
2018–19	3	Szeged-Grosics Akadémia	1 / 16	68
2019–20	2	Szeged-Csanád Grosics Akadémia	12 / 20	34
2020–21	2	Szeged-Csanád Grosics Akadémia	10 / 20	56
2021–22	2	Szeged-Csanád Grosics Akadémia	4 / 20	66
2022–23	2	Szeged-Csanád Grosics Akadémia	4 / 20	64
2023–24	2	Szeged-Csanád Grosics Akadémia	4 / 18	60
2024–25	2	Szeged-Csanád Grosics Akadémia	7 / 16	42
2025–26	2	Szeged-Csanád Grosics Akadémia	9 / 16	36

== See also ==
- Szegedi AK
