= Balmazújvárosi FC =

Hungarian football club

- Full name: Balmazújvárosi Football Club
- Founded: 2011; 15 years ago
- Ground: Városi Stadion; Balmazújváros, Hungary
- Capacity: 2,435
- Chairman: István Tiba
- Manager: Balázs Bekő
- League: NB II
- 2018–19: 17th
- Website: balmazfoci.hu
Home colours	Away colours

Balmazújvárosi FC, also known by the sponsor name Balmaz Kamilla Gyógyfürdő or the company name Balmazújváros Sport, is a Hungarian football club located in Balmazújváros, Hungary. It currently plays in Nemzeti Bajnokság I. The team's colors are orange and black.

== History ==
Between 2011 and 2016 the club received 1.2 billion HUF as a backing to develop the club's stadium and the team.

On 17 September 2012, László Arany was sacked by the club after the defeat against Ceglédi VSE at home. The team with Arany could win only the first match of the 2012–13 Nemzeti Bajnokság II season against DVSC-DEAC but after they lost four matches in a row.

In the 2014–15 Nemzeti Bajnokság II season Balmazújváros managed to escape from relegation from the second division by finishing 13th and gaining one point more than their rival Siófok.

In the 2015–16 Nemzeti Bajnokság II season Balmazújváros finished 5th therefore they could not get promoted to the first division.

On 4 June 2017, Balmazújváros finished second in the 2016–17 Nemzeti Bajnokság II season thereby gaining promotion to the highest level of the Hungarian League system. Balmazújváros is going to play in the 2017–18 Nemzeti Bajnokság I season. On the 38th match day Balmazújváros hosted their rival Kisvárda at home at the Balmazújvárosi Városi Sportpálya, Balmazújváros on 4 June 2017. The match was won by Balmazújváros by 1–0 and the only goal of the match was scored by Ervin Zsiga in the 84th minute.

On 13 June 2017, the management of Balmazújváros FC appointed Ferenc Horváth as the manager of the club. Previously Horváth managed Kecskeméti TE, Paksi FC, Győri ETO FC, Videoton FC, and Diósgyőri VTK.

On 3 January 2019, Balázs Bekő was sacked since the club finished the first half of the 2018–19 Nemzeti Bajnokság II season at the 18th position. Toni Golem was appointed as the manager of the club.

On 29 August 2019, the club was excluded from the 2019–20 Nemzeti Bajnokság II.

== Honours ==
- Nemzeti Bajnokság II
  - Runners–up (1): 2016–17
- Nemzeti Bajnokság III
  - Winners (2): 1981–82, 1992–93

== Stadium ==
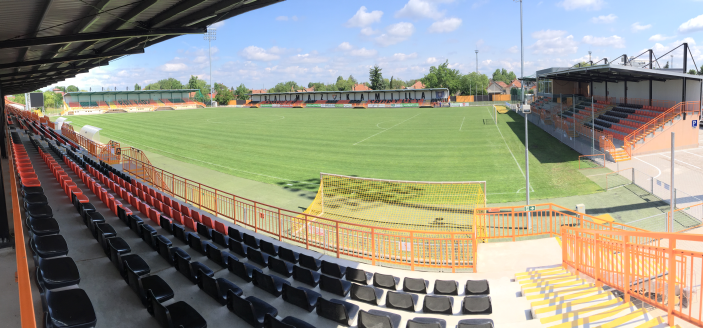

Balmazújváros play their home matches at the Városi Sportpálya with a capacity of 2,400. The stadium was opened in 2013.

== Current squad ==
As of 11 August 2018

Note: Flags indicate national team as defined under FIFA eligibility rules; some limited exceptions apply. Players may hold more than one non-FIFA nationality.

No.	Pos.	Nation	Player
1	GK	HUN	Gergő Szécsi
2	DF	HUN	György Bora
3	DF	HUN	Barna Papucsek
5	DF	HUN	Bence Jagodics
6	DF	HUN	Krisztián Póti
7	MF	HUN	Márk Kónya
8	MF	HUN	Balázs Szabó (on loan from Diósgyőri)
9	FW	HUN	Ádám Fekete
11	FW	HUN	Norbert Kundrák
14	FW	HUN	Zsolt Óvári (on loan from Diósgyőri)
16	MF	HUN	Bálint Domokos
19	DF	HUN	Bátor Szabó

No.	Pos.	Nation	Player
20	MF	HUN	Krisztián Zádori
21	DF	HUN	Norbert Farkas
40	MF	HUN	György Kamarás
44	MF	HUN	Ákos Biró (on loan from Honvéd)
55	MF	HUN	István Bódis
56	MF	HUN	Viktor Peszmeg
70	FW	HUN	István Berki
29	DF	HUN	Áron Schmid
77	FW	HUN	Ádám Pintér
87	GK	HUN	István Verpecz (on loan from Paks)
91	DF	HUN	András Szalai (on loan from Paks)
99	MF	HUN	Nándor Kóródi (on loan from Debreceni)

=== Out on loan ===
Note: Flags indicate national team as defined under FIFA eligibility rules; some limited exceptions apply. Players may hold more than one non-FIFA nationality.

No. / Pos. / Nation / Player; — / MF / HUN / Norbert Pintér (to Szolnok)	No. / Pos. / Nation / Player; — / MF / HUN / György Viscsák (to Tiszaújváros)

== Season results ==
The following table includes the seasons the club spent in the Nemzeti Bajnokság I only.

Domestic												International		Manager
Nemzeti Bajnokság											Magyar Kupa	International		Manager
Div.	No.	Season	MP	W	D	L	GF–GA	Dif.	Pts.	Pos.	Magyar Kupa	Competition	Result	Manager
NBII	1.	2011–12	30	12	6	12	52–40	+12	42	8th	L32			(Hungary)
NBII	2.	2012–14	30	14	8	8	50–37	+13	50	4th	TBD			(Hungary)
NBII	3.	2013–14	30	11	8	11	49–48	+1	41	8th	TBD			(Hungary)
NBII	4.	2014–15	30	8	8	14	35–52	−17	32	13th	TBD			(Hungary)
NBII	5.	2015–16	30	15	6	9	46–39	+7	51	5th	TBD			(Hungary)
NBII	6.	2016–17	38	22	7	9	49–34	+15	73	2nd	R8			(Hungary) Feczkó
NBI	1.	2017–18	33	8	12	13	39–46	−7	36	11th	SF			(Hungary) Horváth
NBII	7.	2018–19	21	4	8	9	17–26	−9	20	17th	R6			(Hungary) Bekő, (Croatia) Golem
Σ		0	0	0	0	0–0	0	0						

- †: defunct
- Italics indicate that the season is still in progress.
- R6= 6th round (last 128 teams) in Magyar Kupa competitions.
- R7= 7th round (last 64 teams)
- R8= 8th round (last 32 teams)
- QF = quarter-finals (last 8 teams)
- SF = semi-finals
- R = runner up

== Managers ==
- (Hungary) Ferenc Horváth
- (Hungary) Balázs Bekő (−3 Jan 2019)
- (Croatia) Toni Golem (7 Jan 2019−Jun 2019)
