= 2018–19 Szombathelyi Haladás season =

Szombathelyi Haladás
2018–19 season
- Chairman: (Hungary) Béla Illés
- Manager: Michal Hipp (until 19 September 2018) (Hungary) Szilárd Desits (caretaker) (Hungary) Ferenc Horváth (from 27 September 2018)
- NB 1: 12th (relegated)
- Hungarian Cup: Round of 16
- Top goalscorer: League: Tamás Priskin (7); All: Tamás Priskin (7)
- Highest home attendance: 8,294 vs Ferencváros (10 November 2018)
- Lowest home attendance: 1,072 vs Mezőkövesd (26 February 2019)
Home colours	Away colours

The 2018–19 season was Szombathelyi Haladás's 63rd competitive football season, 11th consecutive season in the OTP Bank Liga and 99th year in existence as a football club.

== Players ==
As of 6 June 2018. Note: Flags indicate national team as defined under FIFA eligibility rules; some limited exceptions apply. Players may hold more than one non-FIFA nationality.

No.	Pos.	Nation	Player
1	GK	(Hungary) HUN	Gábor Király
4	MF	(Georgia (country)) GEO	Murtaz Daushvili
5	DF	(Hungary) HUN	Tamás László
6	MF	(Hungary) HUN	Patrik Nyári
7	MF	(Portugal) POR	Rui Pedro
8	FW	(Nigeria) NGA	Funsho Bamgboye
10	FW	(Slovakia) SVK	Karol Mészáros
11	MF	(Ukraine) UKR	Oleh Holodyuk
14	FW	(Hungary) HUN	Bálint Gaál
17	MF	(Germany) GER	Reagy Ofosu
19	FW	(Czech Republic) CZE	Michael Rabušic
20	FW	(Hungary) HUN	Tamás Priskin (loan from Ferencvárosi TC)
22	DF	(Hungary) HUN	Dávid Mohl
23	DF	(Hungary) HUN	Szabolcs Schimmer

No.	Pos.	Nation	Player
26	DF	(Hungary) HUN	Márk Jagodics
29	DF	(Hungary) HUN	Milán Németh
31	MF	(Hungary) HUN	Márió Németh
32	DF	(Slovakia) SVK	Kristián Kolčák
33	MF	(Bulgaria) BUL	Galin Ivanov
35	DF	(Hungary) HUN	Predrag Bošnjak
44	GK	(Hungary) HUN	Márton Gyurján
66	GK	(Hungary) HUN	Dániel Rózsa
70	DF	(Hungary) HUN	András Jancsó
77	DF	(Ukraine) UKR	Yuriy Habovda
79	MF	(Hungary) HUN	Péter Halmosi (captain)
85	DF	(Slovakia) SVK	Kornel Saláta
88	MF	(Hungary) HUN	Gergő Holdampf
—	DF	(Hungary) HUN	Gergő Bolla

Players transferred during the season Note: Flags indicate national team as defined under FIFA eligibility rules; some limited exceptions apply. Players may hold more than one non-FIFA nationality.

No.	Pos.	Nation	Player
—	DF	(Czech Republic) CZE	Vít Beneš (loan from Vasas SC)
—	MF	(Denmark) DEN	Emil Lyng
—	MF	(Hungary) HUN	Máté Kovalovszki
—	MF	(Serbia) SRB	Miroslav Grumić
—	MF	(Hungary) HUN	Balázs Petró
—	MF	(Hungary) HUN	Barnabás Rácz
—	MF	(Hungary) HUN	Lóránt Kovács
—	FW	(Slovakia) SVK	Patrik Pinte

=== Summer ===
In: Note: Flags indicate national team as defined under FIFA eligibility rules; some limited exceptions apply. Players may hold more than one non-FIFA nationality.

No.	Pos.	Nation	Player
—	GK	(Hungary) HUN	Ágoston Kiss (from Illés Akadémia)
—	DF	(Hungary) HUN	Gergő Bolla (from Illés Akadémia)
—	DF	(Hungary) HUN	Tamás László (from Balmazújvárosi FC)
—	DF	(Ukraine) UKR	Yuriy Habovda (from Balmazújvárosi FC)
—	DF	(Czech Republic) CZE	Vít Beneš (loan from Vasas SC)
—	DF	(Hungary) HUN	Dávid Tóth (return loan from Soproni VSE)
—	DF	(Hungary) HUN	Zsolt Angyal (return loan from Soproni VSE)
—	MF	(Hungary) HUN	Kristóf Tóth-Gábor (from Illés Akadémia)
—	MF	(Hungary) HUN	Soma Szellák (return loan from Dorogi FC)
—	MF	(Hungary) HUN	Máté Kovalovszki (from Illés Akadémia)
—	MF	(Denmark) DEN	Emil Lyng (from (Scotland) Dundee United)
—	MF	(Hungary) HUN	Martin Tóth (return loan from Soproni VSE)
—	MF	(Hungary) HUN	Dániel Szőke (return loan from Soproni VSE)
—	MF	(Georgia (country)) GEO	Murtaz Daushvili (from (Georgia (country)) FC Samtredia)
—	MF	(Germany) GER	Reagy Ofosu (from (Slovakia) FC Spartak Trnava)
—	FW	(Hungary) HUN	Tamás Priskin (loan from Ferencvárosi TC)
—	FW	(Hungary) HUN	Bálint Gaál (from Vasas SC)

Out: Note: Flags indicate national team as defined under FIFA eligibility rules; some limited exceptions apply. Players may hold more than one non-FIFA nationality.

No.	Pos.	Nation	Player
—	GK	(Hungary) HUN	Gergely Lévay (to (Austria) SV Stegersbach)
—	DF	(Hungary) HUN	Kristóf Polgár (to Diósgyőr)
—	DF	(Belgium) BEL	Stef Wils (to (Belgium) K. Lyra T.S.V.)
—	DF	(Hungary) HUN	Dávid Tóth (loan to Győri ETO FC)
—	DF	(Hungary) HUN	Zsolt Angyal (to (Austria) SC Lockenhaus)
—	MF	(Hungary) HUN	Dániel Szőke (loan to Nagykanizsa FC)
—	MF	(Hungary) HUN	Máté Tóth (loan to Mezőkövesd-Zsóry SE)
—	MF	(Hungary) HUN	Martin Tóth (loan to BFC Siófok)
—	MF	(Hungary) HUN	Bence Kiss (loan to Kazincbarcikai SC)
—	MF	(Hungary) HUN	Soma Szellák (to Pécsi MFC)
—	FW	(Brazil) BRA	Myke Ramos (loan return to MTK Budapest)
—	FW	(Australia) AUS	David Williams (to (New Zealand) Wellington Phoenix)
—	FW	(Hungary) HUN	Tamás Kiss (to Puskás Akadémia FC)
—	FW	(Hungary) HUN	Zoltán Medgyes (loan to BFC Siófok)

=== Winter ===
In: Note: Flags indicate national team as defined under FIFA eligibility rules; some limited exceptions apply. Players may hold more than one non-FIFA nationality.

No.	Pos.	Nation	Player
—	DF	(Slovakia) SVK	Kornel Saláta (from (Slovakia) ŠK Slovan Bratislava)
—	DF	(Hungary) HUN	Dávid Mohl (from Újpest FC)
—	MF	(Hungary) HUN	Gergő Holdampf (from Budapest Honvéd)
—	MF	(Portugal) POR	Rui Pedro (loan from FTC)
—	MF	(Ukraine) UKR	Oleh Holodyuk (from (Ukraine) Karpaty Lviv)
—	MF	(Bulgaria) BUL	Galin Ivanov (from (Bulgaria) Slavia Sofia)

Out: Note: Flags indicate national team as defined under FIFA eligibility rules; some limited exceptions apply. Players may hold more than one non-FIFA nationality.

No.	Pos.	Nation	Player
—	DF	(Czech Republic) CZE	Vít Beneš (loan return to Vasas SC)
—	MF	(Denmark) DEN	Emil Lyng (to (Iceland) Valur)
—	MF	(Hungary) HUN	Máté Kovalovszki (loan to Mosonmagyaróvári TE)
—	MF	(Serbia) SRB	Miroslav Grumić (to Zalaegerszegi TE)
—	MF	(Hungary) HUN	Balázs Petró (loan to Győri ETO FC)
—	MF	(Hungary) HUN	Barnabás Rácz (to Újpest FC)
—	MF	(Hungary) HUN	Lóránt Kovács (to Újpest FC)
—	FW	(Slovakia) SVK	Patrik Pinte (loan to (Slovakia) KFC Komárno)

== Statistics ==
=== Appearances and goals ===
Last updated on 19 May 2019.

No.	Pos	Nat	Player	Total		OTP Bank Liga		Hungarian Cup	
No.	Pos	Nat	Player	Apps	Goals	Apps	Goals	Apps	Goals
1	GK	(Hungary) HUN	Gábor Király	24	-37	24	-37	0	0
4	DF	(Georgia (country)) GEO	Murtaz Daushvili	20	0	18	0	2	0
5	DF	(Hungary) HUN	László Tamás	23	0	21	0	2	0
6	MF	(Hungary) HUN	Patrik Nyári	2	0	2	0	0	0
7	MF	(Portugal) POR	Rui Pedro	17	5	15	5	2	0
8	FW	(Nigeria) NGA	Funsho Bamgboye	36	4	31	4	5	0
10	MF	(Slovakia) SVK	Karol Mészáros	21	2	19	2	2	0
11	MF	(Ukraine) UKR	Oleh Holodyuk	12	1	10	1	2	0
14	FW	(Hungary) HUN	Bálint Gaál	29	5	26	5	3	0
17	FW	(Germany) GER	Reagy Ofosu	24	0	23	0	1	0
19	FW	(Czech Republic) CZE	Michael Rabušic	19	2	15	2	4	0
20	FW	(Hungary) HUN	Tamás Priskin	21	7	21	7	0	0
22	DF	(Hungary) HUN	Dávid Mohl	8	0	7	0	1	0
23	DF	(Hungary) HUN	Szabolcs Schimmer	14	0	9	0	5	0
26	DF	(Hungary) HUN	Márk Jagodics	29	2	25	1	4	1
29	DF	(Hungary) HUN	Milán Németh	22	0	20	0	2	0
31	MF	(Hungary) HUN	Márió Németh	23	1	20	1	3	0
32	DF	(Slovakia) SVK	Kristián Kolčák	21	0	16	0	5	0
33	MF	(Bulgaria) BUL	Galin Ivanov	15	2	13	2	2	0
35	DF	(Hungary) HUN	Predrag Bošnjak	13	0	13	0	0	0
66	GK	(Hungary) HUN	Dániel Rózsa	13	-15	12	-14	1	-1
70	MF	(Hungary) HUN	András Jancsó	8	0	7	0	1	0
77	DF	(Ukraine) UKR	Yuriy Habovda	31	1	30	1	1	0
79	MF	(Hungary) HUN	Péter Halmosi	12	0	10	0	2	0
85	DF	(Slovakia) SVK	Kornel Saláta	8	0	7	0	1	0
88	MF	(Hungary) HUN	Gergő Holdampf	9	0	8	0	1	0
Youth players:
44	GK	(Hungary) HUN	Márton Gyurján	5	-3	0	0	5	-3
Out to loan:
6	MF	(Hungary) HUN	Máté Kovalovszki	2	0	0	0	2	0
80	MF	(Hungary) HUN	Balázs Petró	2	0	1	0	1	0
Players no longer at the club:
9	FW	(Denmark) DEN	Emil Lyng	2	0	2	0	0	0
11	FW	(Serbia) SRB	Miroslav Grumić	12	2	10	0	2	2
13	DF	(Czech Republic) CZE	Vít Beneš	15	1	13	0	2	1
16	MF	(Hungary) HUN	Barnabás Rácz	14	0	11	0	3	0
27	MF	(Hungary) HUN	Lóránt Kovács	6	3	4	0	2	3

=== Top scorers ===
Includes all competitive matches. The list is sorted by shirt number when total goals are equal.

Last updated on 19 May 2019

Position	Nation	Number	Name	OTP Bank Liga	Hungarian Cup	Total
1	(Hungary)	20	Tamás Priskin	7	0	7
2	(Hungary)	14	Bálint Gaál	5	0	5
3	(Portugal)	7	Rui Pedro	5	0	5
4	(Nigeria)	8	Funsho Bamgboye	4	0	4
5	(Hungary)	27	Lóránt Kovács	0	3	3
6	(Slovakia)	10	Karol Mészáros	2	0	2
7	(Czech Republic)	19	Michael Rabušic	2	0	2
8	(Bulgaria)	33	Galin Ivanov	2	0	2
9	(Hungary)	26	Márk Jagodics	1	1	2
10	(Serbia)	11	Miroslav Grumić	0	2	2
11	(Ukraine)	77	Yuriy Habovda	1	0	1
12	(Ukraine)	11	Oleh Holodyuk	1	0	1
13	(Hungary)	31	Márió Németh	1	0	1
14	(Czech Republic)	13	Vít Beneš	0	1	1
/	/	/	Own Goals	0	2	2
			TOTALS	31	9	40

=== Disciplinary record ===
Includes all competitive matches. Players with 1 card or more included only.

Last updated on 19 May 2019

Position	Nation	Number	Name	OTP Bank Liga		Hungarian Cup		Total (Hu Total)	
Position	Nation	Number	Name	Booked	Sent off (straight red)	Booked	Sent off (straight red)	Booked	Sent off (straight red)
GK	(Hungary)	1	Gábor Király	3	1	0	0	3 (3)	1 (1)
DF	(Georgia (country))	4	Murtaz Daushvili	8	0	2	0	10 (8)	0 (0)
DF	(Hungary)	5	László Tamás	7	0	0	0	7 (7)	0 (0)
MF	(Portugal)	7	Rui Pedro	3	0	1	0	4 (3)	0 (0)
MF	(Nigeria)	8	Funsho Bamgboye	6	0	0	0	6 (6)	0 (0)
MF	(Slovakia)	10	Karol Mészáros	3	1	1	0	4 (3)	1 (1)
MF	(Ukraine)	11	Oleh Holodyuk	4	0	2	0	6 (4)	0 (0)
DF	(Czech Republic)	13	Vít Beneš	2	0	0	0	2 (2)	0 (0)
FW	(Hungary)	14	Bálint Gaál	4	0	0	0	4 (4)	0 (0)
FW	(Germany)	17	Reagy Ofosu	4	0	0	0	4 (4)	0 (0)
FW	(Czech Republic)	19	Michael Rabušic	2	0	0	0	2 (2)	0 (0)
FW	(Hungary)	20	Tamás Priskin	6	1	0	0	6 (6)	1 (1)
DF	(Hungary)	22	Dávid Mohl	2	0	0	0	2 (2)	0 (0)
DF	(Hungary)	23	Szabolcs Schimmer	0	0	1	0	1 (0)	0 (0)
DF	(Hungary)	26	Márk Jagodics	7	1	0	0	7 (7)	1 (1)
MF	(Hungary)	27	Lóránt Kovács	3	0	0	0	3 (3)	0 (0)
DF	(Hungary)	29	Milán Németh	6	0	1	0	7 (6)	0 (0)
MF	(Hungary)	31	Márió Németh	2	0	0	0	2 (2)	0 (0)
DF	(Slovakia)	32	Kristián Kolčák	2	0	0	0	2 (2)	0 (0)
MF	(Bulgaria)	33	Galin Ivanov	1	0	0	0	1 (1)	0 (0)
DF	(Hungary)	35	Predrag Bošnjak	2	1	0	0	2 (2)	1 (1)
MF	(Hungary)	70	András Jancsó	3	0	0	0	3 (3)	0 (0)
DF	(Ukraine)	77	Yuriy Habovda	7	0	0	0	7 (7)	0 (0)
MF	(Hungary)	80	Balázs Petró	1	0	1	0	2 (1)	0 (0)
DF	(Slovakia)	85	Kornel Saláta	1	0	0	0	1 (1)	0 (0)
MF	(Hungary)	88	Gergő Holdampf	3	0	1	0	4 (3)	0 (0)
			TOTALS	92	5	10	0	102 (92)	5 (5)

=== Overall ===
Games played	38 (33 OTP Bank Liga and 5 Hungarian Cup)
Games won	11 (8 OTP Bank Liga and 3 Hungarian Cup)
Games drawn	7 (6 OTP Bank Liga and 1 Hungarian Cup)
Games lost	20 (19 OTP Bank Liga and 1 Hungarian Cup)
Goals scored	40
Goals conceded	55
Goal difference	-15
Yellow cards	102
Red cards	5
Worst discipline	(Georgia (country)) Murtaz Daushvili (10 (yellow card) , 0 (red card) )
Best result	3–0 (H) v Puskás Akadémia - Nemzeti Bajnokság I - 30-03-2019
Worst result	0–4 (A) v MTK Budapest - Nemzeti Bajnokság I - 8-12-2018
Most appearances	(Nigeria) Funsho Bamgboye (36 appearances)
Top scorer	(Hungary) Tamás Priskin (7 goals)
Points	40/114 (35.09%)

Last updated: 19 May 2019

== Nemzeti Bajnokság I ==
=== League table ===
Pos	Team	Pld	W	D	L	GF	GA	GD	Pts	Qualification or relegation
8	Paks	33	9	12	12	33	46	−13	39	
9	Kisvárda	33	10	8	15	36	48	−12	38	
10	Diósgyőr	33	10	8	15	36	57	−21	38	
11	MTK (R)	33	10	4	19	42	56	−14	34	Relegation to the Nemzeti Bajnokság II
12	Szombathelyi Haladás (R)	33	8	6	19	31	51	−20	30	Relegation to the Nemzeti Bajnokság II

Source: Hungarian Football Federation (in Hungarian), Soccerway
Rules for classification: 1) Points; 2) Matches won; 3) Goal difference; 4) Goals scored; 5) Head-to-head points; 6) Head-to-head goal difference; 7) Head-to-head away goals scored; 8) Fair play ranking; 9) Drawing of lots.
(R) Relegated

=== Matches ===
21 July 2018 1	Honvéd	3–2	Szombathelyi Haladás	Budapest, Pest County
20:15 CEST	Danilo 38'; Kamber 67'; Lukács D. 76'	(Report)	Priskin 45' (red card) 81'; Bamgboye 80'	Stadium: Bozsik Stadion; Attendance: 1,670; Referee: (Hungary) Balázs Berke

29 July 2018 2	Szombathelyi Haladás	2–2	Újpest	Szombathely, Vas County
18:00 CEST	Rabušic 24'; Jagodics M. 60'	(Report)	Nagy D. 19'; Horj 42'	Stadium: Haladás Sportkomplexum; Attendance: 4,965; Referee: (Hungary) József Erdős

4 August 2018 3	Ferencváros	3–1	Szombathelyi Haladás	Budapest, Pest County
20:15 CEST	Varga R. 23'; Lanzafame 52' 63' (pen.)	(Report)	Gaál B. 49'; Jagodics M. (red card) 86'	Stadium: Groupama Arena; Attendance: 7,504; Referee: (Hungary) Gergely Szőts

11 August 2018 4	Szombathelyi Haladás	2–1	Puskás Akadémia	Szombathely, Vas County
19:30 CEST	Mészáros 69' (pen.) 87' (pen.)	(Report)	Molnár 90+3'	Stadium: Haladás Sportkomplexum; Attendance: 3,936; Referee: (Hungary) Péter Solymosi

18 August 2018 5	DVTK	1–0	Szombathelyi Haladás	Miskolc, Borsod-Abaúj-Zemplén County
19:30 CEST	Tóth B. 35'	(Report)	Grumić (red card) 65'	Stadium: Diósgyőri Stadion; Attendance: 3,023; Referee: (Hungary) Sándor Andó-Szabó

25 August 2018 6	Szombathelyi Haladás	1–2	MTK	Szombathely, Vas County
20:45 CEST	Gaál B. 90+1'	(Report)	Schäfer 49'; Gera D. 81'	Stadium: Haladás Sportkomplexum; Attendance: 4,117; Referee: (Hungary) Ferenc Karakó

1 September 2018 7	Debrecen	1–1	Szombathelyi Haladás	Debrecen, Hajdú-Bihar County
17:00 CEST	Takács T. 45'	(Report)	Priskin 41'	Stadium: Nagyerdei Stadion; Attendance: 3,203; Referee: (Hungary) József Erdős

15 September 2018 8	Kisvárda	4–1	Szombathelyi Haladás	Kisvárda, Szabolcs-Szatmár-Bereg County
17:00 CEST	Ilić 18' 69'; Horváth Z. 29'; Misić 57'	(Report)	Priskin 66'	Stadium: Várkert Sportpálya; Attendance: 1,983; Referee: (Hungary) Ádám Németh

29 September 2018 9	Szombathelyi Haladás	1–2	Paks	Szombathely, Vas County
17:00 CEST	Priskin 51'	(Report)	Simon A. 62'; Kecskés 89'	Stadium: Haladás Sportkomplexum; Attendance: 2,846; Referee: (Hungary) Péter Solymosi

6 October 2018 10	Mezőkövesd	2–0	Szombathelyi Haladás	Mezőkövesd, Borsod-Abaúj-Zemplén County
17:00 CEST	Molnár 6'; Koszta 90+2' (pen.)	(Report)		Stadium: Mezőkövesdi Városi Stadion; Attendance: 2,168; Referee: (Hungary) Sándor Andó-Szabó

20 October 2018 11	Szombathelyi Haladás	0–2	Videoton	Szombathely, Vas County
17:00 CEST		(Report)	Šćepović 61'; Pátkai 69'	Stadium: Haladás Sportkomplexum; Attendance: 3,317; Referee: (Hungary) Balázs Berke

27 October 2018 12	Szombathelyi Haladás	0–1	Honvéd	Szombathely, Vas County
17:00 CEST	Bošnjak (yellow card) 14' (yellow-red card) 83'	(Report)	Danilo 91'	Stadium: Haladás Sportkomplexum; Attendance: 3,176; Referee: (Hungary) Viktor Kassai

3 November 2018 13	Újpest	2–0	Szombathelyi Haladás	Budapest, Pest County
17:00 CET	Balázs B. 71'; Nwodobo 81'	(Report)		Stadium: Szusza Ferenc Stadium; Attendance: 2,350; Referee: (Hungary) Ferenc Karakó

10 November 2018 14	Szombathelyi Haladás	1–0	Ferencváros	Szombathely, Vas County
19:30 CET	Gaál B. 53' (pen.)	(Report)		Stadium: Haladás Sportkomplexum; Attendance: 8,294; Referee: (Hungary) Ádám Farkas

24 November 2018 15	Puskás Akadémia	2–0	Szombathelyi Haladás	Felcsút, Fejér County
17:00 CET	Kiss T. 12'; Knežević 17'	(Report)		Stadium: Pancho Aréna; Attendance: 700; Referee: (Hungary) Gergely Szőts

1 December 2018 16	Szombathelyi Haladás	1–1	DVTK	Szombathely, Vas County
17:00 CET	Habovda 70'	(Report)	Hasani 64'	Stadium: Haladás Sportkomplexum; Attendance: 2,214; Referee: (Hungary) Sándor Andó-Szabó

8 December 2018 17	MTK	4–0	Szombathelyi Haladás	Budapest, Pest County
17:00 CET	Baki 5'; Lencse 49'; Gera 57'; Farkas 87'	(Report)		Stadium: Hidegkuti Nándor Stadion; Attendance: 500; Referee: (Hungary) Ferenc Karakó

15 December 2018 18	Szombathelyi Haladás	0–2	Debrecen	Szombathely, Vas County
17:00 CET	Mészáros K. (yellow card) 82' (yellow-red card) 90'	(Report)	Bódi 14'; Szécsi M. 58'	Stadium: Haladás Sportkomplexum; Attendance: 1,220; Referee: (Hungary) Viktor Kassai

2 February 2019 19	Szombathelyi Haladás	0–1	Kisvárda	Szombathely, Vas County
17:00 CET		(Report)	Horváth Z. 51'	Stadium: Haladás Sportkomplexum; Attendance: 2,512; Referee: (Hungary) Gergő Bogár

9 February 2019 20	Paks	1–1	Szombathelyi Haladás	Paks, Tolna County
17:00 CET	Simon A. 30'	(Report)	Bamgboye 82'	Stadium: Stadion PSE; Attendance: 600; Referee: (Hungary) Péter Solymosi

16 February 2019 21	Szombathelyi Haladás	1–2	Mezőkövesd	Szombathely, Vas County
17:00 CET	Rui Pedro 23'	(Report)	Dražić 32' 38'	Stadium: Haladás Sportkomplexum; Attendance: 1,930; Referee: (Hungary) Gergely Szőts

23 February 2019 22	Videoton	1–0	Szombathelyi Haladás	Székesfehérvár, Fejér County
17:00 CET	Kovács I. 79'	(Report)		Stadium: Sóstói Stadion; Attendance: 2,048; Referee: (Hungary) Ferenc Karakó

2 March 2019 23	Honvéd	1–3	Szombathelyi Haladás	Budapest, Pest County
17:00 CET	Holender 54'	(Report)	Gaál B. 38'; Holodyuk 77'; Ivanov 89'	Stadium: Bozsik Stadion; Attendance: 1,565; Referee: (Hungary) József Erdős

9 March 2019 24	Szombathelyi Haladás	3–2	Újpest	Szombathely, Vas County
17:00 CET	Bamgboye 62' 67'; Németh M. 65'	(Report)	Novothny 17' 38'	Stadium: Haladás Sportkomplexum; Attendance: 3,023; Referee: (Hungary) Sándor Andó-Szabó

16 March 2019 25	Ferencváros	2–0	Szombathelyi Haladás	Budapest, Pest County
17:00 CET	Lovrencsics 70'; Sigér 78'	(Report)	Király G. (yellow card) 70' (yellow-red card) 70'	Stadium: Groupama Arena; Attendance: 7,865; Referee: (Hungary) Ferenc Karakó

30 March 2019 26	Szombathelyi Haladás	3–0	Puskás Akadémia	Szombathely, Vas County
17:00 CET	Rabušic 30'; Rui Pedro 45+1' 58'	(Report)		Stadium: Haladás Sportkomplexum; Attendance: 2,745; Referee: (Hungary) Balázs Berke

6 April 2019 27	DVTK	0–1	Szombathelyi Haladás	Miskolc, Borsod-Abaúj-Zemplén County
17:00 CEST		(Report)	Rui Pedro 77'	Stadium: Diósgyőri Stadion; Attendance: 4,117; Referee: (Hungary) Ádám Farkas

13 April 2019 28	Szombathelyi Haladás	1–0	MTK	Szombathely, Vas County
17:00 CEST	Gaál B. 85'	(Report)		Stadium: Haladás Sportkomplexum; Attendance: 3,440; Referee: (Hungary) Gergely Szőts

20 April 2019 29	Debrecen	2–1	Szombathelyi Haladás	Debrecen, Hajdú-Bihar County
17:00 CEST	Szatmári Cs. 35'; Bódi 64' (pen.)	(Report)	Ivanov 76'	Stadium: Nagyerdei Stadion; Attendance: 3,600; Referee: (Hungary) Gergő Bogár

27 April 2019+3 30	Kisvárda	1–2	Szombathelyi Haladás	Kisvárda, Szabolcs-Szatmár-Bereg County
17:00 CEST	Grozav 11'	(Report)	Priskin 24' (pen.); Rui Pedro 27'	Stadium: Várkert Sportpálya; Attendance: 2,620; Referee: (Hungary) József Erdős

4 May 2018 31	Szombathelyi Haladás	1–1	Paks	Szombathely, Vas County
17:00 CEST	Priskin 64' (pen.)	(Report)	Remili 90+3'	Stadium: Haladás Sportkomplexum; Attendance: 4,246; Referee: (Hungary) Balázs Berke

11 May 2019 32	Mezőkövesd	1–0	Szombathelyi Haladás	Mezőkövesd, Borsod-Abaúj-Zemplén County
17:00 CEST	Moutari 66'	(Report)		Stadium: Mezőkövesdi Városi Stadion; Attendance: 1,500; Referee: (Hungary) Péter Solymosi

19 May 2019 33	Szombathelyi Haladás	1–1	Videoton	Szombathely, Vas County
17:00 CEST	Priskin 67'	(Report)	Németh M. 80' (o.g.)	Stadium: Haladás Sportkomplexum; Attendance: 3,340; Referee: (Hungary) Ádám Pillók

=== Results summary ===
Overall								Home						Away					
Pld	W	D	L	GF	GA	GD	Pts	W	D	L	GF	GA	GD	W	D	L	GF	GA	GD
33	8	6	19	31	51	−20	30	5	4	7	18	20	−2	3	2	12	13	31	−18

Last updated: 19 May 2019.
Source: NB1

=== Results by round ===
Round	1	2	3	4	5	6	7	8	9	10	11	12	13	14	15	16	17	18	19	20	21	22	23	24	25	26	27	28	29	30	31	32	33
Ground	A	H	A	H	A	H	A	A	H	A	H	H	A	H	A	H	A	H	H	A	H	A	A	H	A	H	A	H	A	A	H	A	H
Result	L	D	L	W	L	L	D	L	L	L	L	L	L	W	L	D	L	L	L	D	L	L	W	W	L	W	W	W	L	W	D	L	D
Position	7	7	9	8	8	10	10	12	12	12	12	12	12	12	12	12	12	12	12	12	12	12	12	12	12	12	12	12	12	12	12	12	12

Updated to match(es) played on 19 May 2019. Source: Matches
A = Away; H = Home; W = Win; D = Draw; L = Loss

== Hungarian Cup ==
23 September 2018 Round 6	Csepel	0 – 2	Haladás	Csepel, Budapest
15:00 CEST		Report	Gauzer 20' (o.g.); Mészáros L. 90' (o.g.)	Stadium: Béke téri Stadion; Attendance: 500; Referee: (Hungary) Szabolcs Szilasi

31 October 2018 Round 7	Szarvasi FC	1 – 3	Haladás	Szarvas, Békés County
12:30 CET	Farkas N. 77'; Viszkok D. (red card) 93'	Report	Kovács L. 39' 82' 91' (pen.)	Stadium: Erzsébet ligeti sportpálya Attendance: 1,080; Referee: (Hungary) Tamás Nazsa

5 December 2018 Round 8	Iváncsa KSE	2 – 4	Haladás	Iváncsa, Fejér County
12:00 CET	Büki B. 52'; Pribék P. 79'	Report	Grumić 10' 32'; Jagodics M. 29'; Beneš 83'	Stadium: Iváncsai sportpálya Attendance: 400; Referee: (Hungary) Péter Zierkelbach

20 February 2019 Round of 16 (1st leg)	Mezőkövesd	0 – 0	Haladás	Mezőkövesd, Borsod-Abaúj-Zemplén County
17:00 CET		Report		Stadium: Mezőkövesdi Városi Stadion; Attendance: 600; Referee: (Hungary) Ádám Németh

26 February 2019 Round of 16 (2nd leg)	Haladás	0 – 1	Mezőkövesd	Szombathely, Vas County
17:30 CET		Report	Koszta 90+1'	Stadium: Haladás Sportkomplexum; Attendance: 1,072; Referee: (Hungary) Attila Molnár

== Friendly games (2018) ==
23 June 2018	Szany SE	0 – 9	Haladás	Szany, Győr-Moson-Sopron County
11:00 CEST (UTC+02)		(Report)	Halmosi 11'; Rácz 12'; Kovács L. 16'; Tóth M. 37' (pen.); Németh M. 53'; Medgyes 56' 86'; Németh M. 68'; Jancsó 88'	Attendance: 400; Referee: (Hungary) Kristóf Köves

26 June 2018	Admira Wacker (Austria)	1 – 0	Szombathelyi Haladás	Wien, Austria
18:00 CEST (UTC+02)	Starkl 12'	(Report)		Stadium: Bundesstadion Südstadt; Attendance: 150; Referee: (Austria) Kijas

30 June 2018	Szombathelyi Haladás	2 – 2	SV Lafnitz (Austria)	Szombathely, Vas County
10:30 CEST (UTC+02)	Bosnjak 39'; Mészáros 62'	(Report)	Schloffer 64' (pen.); Zivotic 70'	Stadium: Haladás Sportkomplexum; Attendance: 300; Referee: (Hungary) Csaba Pintér

4 July 2018	NK Nafta Lendava (Slovenia)	2 – 2	Szombathelyi Haladás	Lendava, Slovenia
19:00 CEST (UTC+02)	Živko 17'; Roginić 34'	(Report)	Grumić 26'; Jancsó 30'	Stadium: Lendava Sports Park; Attendance: 300; Referee: (Slovenia) Hozjan

7 July 2018 Király kupa	Szombathelyi Haladás	0 – 1	Kaposvári Rákóczi FC	Szombathely, Vas County
14:00 CEST (UTC+02)		(Report)	Hegedűs 26'	Stadium: Király Sportlétesítmény; Attendance: 300; Referee: (Hungary) Zsolt Király

7 July 2018 Király kupa	Szombathelyi Haladás	0 – 2	Paksi SE	Szombathely, Vas County
17:30 CEST (UTC+02)		(Report)	Lenzsér 5'; Simon A. 24'	Stadium: Király Sportlétesítmény; Attendance: 300; Referee: (Hungary) Gergely Kovács

14 July 2018	Szombathelyi Haladás	1 – 1	1. FC Slovácko (Czech Republic)	Pöllauberg, Styria
16:00 CEST (UTC+02)	Lyng 35'	(Report)	Sadílek 90'	Attendance: 100; Referee: (Austria) Waissfobacher

6 September 2018	SV Mattersburg (Austria)	3 – 0	Szombathelyi Haladás	Sankt Johann in der Haide, Hartberg-Fürstenfeld District
18:00 CEST (UTC+02)	Fran Sánchez 37'; Pušić 45'; Gruber 78'	(Report)		Attendance: 150; Referee: (Austria) Krainer

12 October 2018	Vác FC	0 – 1	Haladás	Várpalota, Veszprém County
13:00 CEST (UTC+02)		(Report)	Petró B. 89'	Stadium: Bányász Stadion; Attendance: 100; Referee: (Hungary) Kiss

16 November 2018	Szombathelyi Haladás	3 – 1	Mosonmagyaróvári TE	Szombathely, Vas County
11:00 CET (UTC+01)	Grumić 17'; Németh M. 65' 74'	(Report)	Stieber A. 87' (pen.)	Stadium: Haladás Sportkomplexum; Attendance: 100; Referee: (Hungary) Gaál

== Friendly games (2019) ==
12 January 2019	Gyirmót	0 – 0	Szombathelyi Haladás	Győr, Győr-Moson-Sopron County
11:00 CET (UTC+01)		(Report)		Stadium: Ménfői úti Stadion; Attendance: 50; Referee: (Hungary) Patrik Horváth

16 January 2019	NK Maribor (Slovenia)	0 – 0	Szombathelyi Haladás	Maribor, Slovenia
16:00 CET (UTC+01)		(Report)		Stadium: Ljudski vrt Attendance: 200; Referee: (Slovenia) Bojan Tkalčič

20 January 2019	FC Okzhetpes (Kazakhstan)	1 – 1	Szombathelyi Haladás	Lara, Antalya, Turkey
15:30 FET (UTC+03)	Kuksin 49'	(Report)	Priskin 88'	Attendance: 50; Referee: (Turkey)

22 January 2019	Sepsi OSK (Romania)	2 – 1	Szombathelyi Haladás	Lara, Antalya, Turkey
18:30 FET (UTC+03)	Hamed 24'; Mensah 82'	(Report)	Rabušic 62'	Referee: (Turkey)

24 January 2019	FC Voluntari (Romania)	1 – 2	Szombathelyi Haladás	Lara, Antalya, Turkey
18:00 FET (UTC+03)	Bălan 76'	(Report)	Saláta 45'; Rui Pedro 67'	Referee: (Turkey)

22 March 2019	Szombathelyi Haladás	2 – 1	Mosonmagyaróvári TE	Szombathely, Vas County
11:00 CET (UTC+01)	Rabušic 4'; Bamgboye 84'	(Report)	Eszlátyi 25'	Stadium: Haladás Sportkomplexum; Attendance: 80; Referee: (Hungary)
