= 2017–18 Szombathelyi Haladás season =

Szombathelyi Haladás
2017–18 season
- Chairman: Béla Illés
- Manager: Géza Mészöly (until 29 August); Bálint Pacsi (from 30 August to 8 November); Michal Hipp (from 13 November)
- Stadium: Káposztás utcai Stadion (Temporary stadium); Haladás Sportkomplexum (New home stadium)
- Nemzeti Bajnokság I: 8th
- Magyar Kupa: Round of 64
- Top goalscorer: League: David Williams (7); All: David Williams (7)
- Highest home attendance: 8,028 (vs Ferencváros, 25 November 2017)
- Lowest home attendance: 1,075 (vs Puskás Akadémia, 26 August 2017)
- Average home league attendance: 3,126
| Home colours | Away colours |

The 2017–18 season was Szombathelyi Haladás's 62nd competitive football season, 10th consecutive season in the Nemzeti Bajnokság I and 98th year in existence as a football club. In addition to the domestic league, Haladás participated in this season's editions of the Magyar Kupa.

== Players ==
As of 7 June 2017. Note: Flags indicate national team as defined under FIFA eligibility rules; some limited exceptions apply. Players may hold more than one non-FIFA nationality.

| No. | Pos. | Nation | Player |
|---|---|---|---|
| 1 | GK | HUN | Gábor Király |
| 6 | DF | BEL | Stef Wils |
| 7 | FW | SVK | Patrik Pinte |
| 8 | FW | NGA | Funsho Bamgboye |
| 9 | FW | SRB | Miroslav Grumić |
| 10 | FW | SVK | Karol Mészáros |
| 11 | FW | AUS | David Williams |
| 12 | MF | HUN | Bence Kiss |
| 13 | DF | HUN | Kristóf Polgár |
| 14 | FW | HUN | Zoltán Medgyes |
| 16 | MF | HUN | Barnabás Rácz |
| 19 | FW | CZE | Michael Rabušic |
| 20 | MF | HUN | Gergő Dombi |
| 21 | FW | HUN | Tamás Kiss |
| 23 | DF | HUN | Szabolcs Schimmer |

| No. | Pos. | Nation | Player |
|---|---|---|---|
| 26 | DF | HUN | Márk Jagodics |
| 27 | MF | HUN | Lóránt Kovács |
| 29 | DF | HUN | Milán Németh |
| 31 | MF | HUN | Márió Németh |
| 32 | DF | SVK | Kristián Kolčák |
| 35 | DF | HUN | Predrag Bošnjak |
| 42 | GK | HUN | Gergely Lévay |
| 44 | GK | HUN | Márton Gyurján |
| 66 | GK | HUN | Dániel Rózsa |
| 70 | DF | HUN | András Jancsó |
| 79 | MF | HUN | Péter Halmosi (captain) |
| 80 | MF | HUN | Balázs Petró |
| 92 | FW | BRA | Myke Ramos (loan from MTK Budapest) |
| 98 | MF | HUN | Máté Tóth |
| 99 | FW | HUN | Kevin Varga |

Players transferred during the season. Note: Flags indicate national team as defined under FIFA eligibility rules; some limited exceptions apply. Players may hold more than one non-FIFA nationality.

| No. | Pos. | Nation | Player |
|---|---|---|---|
| — | DF | HUN | Gábor Jánvári |
| — | DF | HUN | Szilárd Devecseri |
| — | DF | HUN | Dávid Tóth |
| — | MF | HUN | Ádám Simon |
| — | MF | HUN | Benjámin Tóth |
| — | FW | ITA | Leandro Martínez |

== Transfers ==
=== Summer ===
In: Note: Flags indicate national team as defined under FIFA eligibility rules; some limited exceptions apply. Players may hold more than one non-FIFA nationality.

| No. | Pos. | Nation | Player |
|---|---|---|---|
| — | DF | HUN | Zsolt Angyal (return loan from Zalaegerszeg) |
| — | DF | HUN | Dávid Tóth (from Sopron) |
| — | DF | HUN | Milán Németh (from Sopron) |
| — | MF | HUN | Patrik Nagy (return loan from Sopron) |
| — | MF | HUN | Bence Grabant (return loan from Dorog) |
| — | MF | HUN | Balázs Petró (return loan from Budaörs) |
| — | MF | HUN | Martin Tóth (return loan from Dorog) |
| — | MF | HUN | Ádám Simon (from Videoton) |
| — | MF | HUN | Zoltán Medgyes (return loan from Dorog) |
| — | MF | HUN | Benjámin Tóth (from Austria Salzburg) |
| — | MF | HUN | Soma Szellák (return loan from Sopron) |
| — | FW | HUN | Olivér Tihanyi (return loan from Cegléd) |
| — | FW | HUN | Milán Török (return loan from Szolnok) |
| — | FW | ITA | Leandro Martínez (return loan from MTK Budapest) |
| — | FW | SVK | Patrik Pinte (from (Slovakia) Slovan Bratislava) |
| — | FW | SRB | Miroslav Grumić (from Kozármisleny) |
| — | FW | BRA | Myke Ramos (loan from MTK Budapest) |
| — | FW | HUN | Bence Soós (return loan from Sopron) |

Out: Note: Flags indicate national team as defined under FIFA eligibility rules; some limited exceptions apply. Players may hold more than one non-FIFA nationality.

| No. | Pos. | Nation | Player |
|---|---|---|---|
| — | DF | HUN | Sándor Hidvégi (to Siófok) |
| — | DF | HUN | Zsolt Angyal (loan to Sopron) |
| — | MF | HUN | Patrik Nagy (to Gyirmót) |
| — | MF | HUN | Bence Iszlai (to Mezőkövesd) |
| — | MF | HUN | Martin Tóth (loan to Sopron) |
| — | MF | HUN | Dániel Szőke (loan to Sopron) |
| — | MF | NED | Sjoerd Overgoor (to (Netherlands) Go Ahead Eagles) |
| — | MF | HUN | Soma Szellák (loan to Dorog) |
| — | MF | HUN | Ádám Simon (to Paks) |
| — | MF | HUN | Bence Grabant (to (Slovenia) Nafta Lendava) |
| — | FW | HUN | Zsolt Gajdos (to Nyíregyháza) |
| — | FW | ROU | Sasa Popin (Released) |
| — | FW | HUN | András Winkler (loan to Sopron) |
| — | FW | HUN | Milán Török (to Hévíz) |
| — | FW | HUN | Olivér Tihanyi (to Balassagyarmat) |
| — | FW | HUN | Bence Soós (to ESMTK) |

=== Winter ===
In: Note: Flags indicate national team as defined under FIFA eligibility rules; some limited exceptions apply. Players may hold more than one non-FIFA nationality.

| No. | Pos. | Nation | Player |
|---|---|---|---|
| — | DF | SVK | Kristián Kolčák (from (Kazakhstan) Aktobe) |
| — | FW | SVK | Karol Mészáros (signed permanently from loan Debrecen) |
| — | FW | CZE | Michael Rabušic (from (Czech Republic) Vysočina Jihlava) |
| — | FW | HUN | András Winkler (return loan from Sopron) |

Out: Note: Flags indicate national team as defined under FIFA eligibility rules; some limited exceptions apply. Players may hold more than one non-FIFA nationality.

| No. | Pos. | Nation | Player |
|---|---|---|---|
| — | DF | HUN | Szilárd Devecseri (to Zalaegerszeg) |
| — | DF | HUN | Gábor Jánvári (to Kisvárda) |
| — | DF | HUN | Dávid Tóth (loan to Sopron) |
| — | MF | HUN | Benjámin Tóth (Released) |
| — | FW | ITA | Leandro Martínez (Released) |
| — | FW | HUN | András Winkler (loan to Mosonmagyaróvár) |

== Pre-season and friendlies ==
| 24 June 2017 Friendly | Haladás | 1–3 | Vasas | Bük |
| 10:30 CEST (UTC+2) | Mészáros 73' | (Report) | Ristevski 26'; Sağlık 64'; B. Király 78' | Attendance: 150; Referee: Csaba Pintér |

| 1 July 2017 Király kupa | Haladás | 0–2 | Paks | Szombathely |
| 14:00 CEST (UTC+2) | | (Report) | Bertus 26' (pen.); Bartha 46' | Stadium: Király Sportlétesítmény; Attendance: 500; Referee: Gaál |

| 1 July 2017 Király kupa | Haladás | 0–1 | Sopron | Szombathely |
| 15:30 CEST (UTC+2) | | (Report) | Sifter 30' | Stadium: Király Sportlétesítmény; Attendance: 500; Referee: G. Kovács |

| 7 July 2017 Friendly | Haladás | 4–0 | Sopron | Szombathely |
| 10:00 CEST (UTC+2) | Medgyes 6'; B. Rácz 16' (pen.); Rozzi 84'; Petró 90+1' | (Report) | | Stadium: Illés Akadémia; Attendance: 100; Referee: Marcell Derdák |

| 7 July 2017 Friendly | Mattersburg (Austria) | 1–1 | (Hungary) Haladás | Eberau, Austria |
| 18:00 CEST (UTC+2) | Varga 90+2' | (Report) | Williams 4' |

| 26 July 2017 Friendly | Haladás (Hungary) | 1–3 | (Turkey) Akhisarspor | Pinkafeld, Austria |
| 18:00 CEST (UTC+2) | Petró 55' | (Report) | Çelik 6'; Ayık 26'; Barbosa 90' | Attendance: 100 |

| 31 August 2017 Friendly | Wiener Neustadt (Austria) | 0–0 | (Hungary) Haladás | Kirchschlag in der Buckligen Welt, Austria |
| 17:30 CEST (UTC+2) | | (Report) | | Attendance: 100 |

| 1 September 2017 Friendly | Hegykő | 0–16 | Haladás | Hegykő |
| 18:00 CEST (UTC+2) | | (Report) | D. Tóth 4'; Mi. Németh 7' 15'; M. Tóth 9'; Má. Németh 19'; Tóth Marcell 24'; L. Kovács 34'; Petró 37' 44' 57'; T. Kiss 42', 48', 53'; K. Varga 51', 56'; Mészáros 60' | Attendance: 400 |

| 5 September 2017 Friendly | Répcelak | 1–5 | Haladás | Répcelak |
| 19:15 CEST (UTC+2) | Tóth D. 82' | (Report) | Bamgboye 10'; Petró 59'; Mészáros 75'; Tóth Marcell 83'; T. Kiss 88' | Attendance: 100 |

| 13 September 2017 Friendly | Jánosháza | 1–8 | Haladás | Jánosháza |
| 18:00 CEST (UTC+2) | Marsai M. | (Report) | Halmosi 8'; Martínez 14'; B. Rácz 22'; Mi. Németh; Grumić; Petró; T. Kiss; Bamgboye | Attendance: 700; Referee: Rudolf Kedves |

| 3 October 2017 Friendly | Slaven Belupo (Croatia) | 2–0 | (Hungary) Haladás | Koprivnica, Croatia |
| 15:00 CEST (UTC+2) | Telushi 2'; B. Bogojević 6' | (Report) | | Stadium: Gradski stadion Attendance: 100; Referee: I. Križarić (Croatia) |

| 11 October 2017 Friendly | Ajka | 1–3 | Haladás | Ajka |
| 15:00 CEST (UTC+2) | Gy. Csemer 81' | (Report) | L. Kovács 67'; Pinte 73'; Mészáros 88' | Stadium: Ajkai Városi Szabadidő- és Sportcentrum; Attendance: 100; Referee: Szabolcs Szilasi |

| 8 November 2017 Haladás Sportkomplexum opening match | Haladás (Hungary) | 3–1 | (Croatia) Osijek | Szombathely, Hungary |
| | Ramos 17'; Grumić 86'; Petró 90+1' | (Report) | Hajradinović 6' | Stadium: Haladás Sportkomplexum; Attendance: 8,500; Referee: Csaba Pintér |

| 17 January 2018 Friendly | Sopron | 2–4 | Haladás | Sopron |
| 11:30 CET (UTC+1) | V. Szabó 78' 80' | (Report) | Halmosi 8'; Williams 26'; M. Tóth 30'; Má. Németh 47' | Stadium: Lővér körúti műfüves Attendance: 50; Referee: Ákos Gaál |

| 20 January 2018 Friendly | Haladás (Hungary) | 4–1 | (Slovakia) Tatran | Szombathely, Hungary |
| 11:30 CET (UTC+1) | Grumić 15'; Má. Németh 17'; Medgyes 67'; Williams 88' | (Report) | Černák 7' | Stadium: Illés Akadémia; Attendance: 100; Referee: Ákos Gaál |

| 24 January 2018 Friendly | Maribor (Slovenia) | 1–1 | (Hungary) Haladás | Maribor, Slovenia |
| 14:00 CET (UTC+1) | Vrhovec 79' | (Report) | Ramos 60' | Stadium: Ljudski vrt Attendance: 400; Referee: Slavko Vinčić (Slovenia) |

| 26 January 2018 Friendly | Haladás (Hungary) | 1–0 | (Bulgaria) Slavia Sofia | Side, Turkey |
| 17:00 TRT (UTC+3) | Kolčák 48' | (Report) | | Attendance: 30 |

| 31 January 2018 Friendly | Haladás (Hungary) | 1–0 | (Serbia) Rad | Belek, Turkey |
| 15:00 TRT (UTC+3) | T. Kiss 34' | (Report) | | Attendance: 30 |

| 3 February 2018 Friendly | Haladás (Hungary) | 2–1 | (Azerbaijan) Zira | Belek, Turkey |
| 15:00 TRT (UTC+3) | Mészáros 12'; Ramos 15' | (Report) | Isgandarli 16' | Attendance: 40 |

| 10 February 2018 Friendly | Haladás (Hungary) | 3–2 | (Slovenia) Nafta Lendava | Szombathely, Hungary |
| 11:00 CET (UTC+1) | Pinte 1'; L. Kovács 13'; Shynder 48' | (Report) | Leon 42'; B. Grabant 83' | Stadium: Kondics utca műfű Attendance: 200; Referee: Csaba Pintér |

| 16 February 2018 Friendly | Wiener Neustadt (Austria) | 1–1 | (Hungary) Haladás | Wiener Neustadt, Austria |
| 15:00 CET (UTC+1) | Adjei 82' | (Report) | Rabušic 52' (pen.) | Stadium: Stadion Wiener Neustadt; Attendance: 150 |

== Competitions ==
=== Overview ===
| Competition | First match | Last match | Starting round | Final position | Record | | | | | | | |
| Competition | First match | Last match | Starting round | Final position | Pld | W | D | L | GF | GA | GD | Win % |
|---|---|---|---|---|---|---|---|---|---|---|---|---|
| Nemzeti Bajnokság I | 15 July 2017 | 2 June 2018 | Matchday 1 | 8th | 33 | 11 | 5 | 17 | 35 | 50 | −15 | 33.33 |
| Magyar Kupa | 20 September 2017 | 24 October 2017 | Round of 128 | Round of 64 | 2 | 1 | 1 | 0 | 7 | 1 | +6 | 50.00 |
| Total | | | | | 35 | 12 | 6 | 17 | 42 | 51 | −9 | 34.29 |

Source: Competitions

=== Nemzeti Bajnokság I ===
==== League table ====
| Pos | Team | Pld | W | D | L | GF | GA | GD | Pts |
|---|---|---|---|---|---|---|---|---|---|
| 6 | Puskás Akadémia | 33 | 11 | 10 | 12 | 41 | 46 | −5 | 43 |
| 7 | Paks | 33 | 11 | 9 | 13 | 43 | 48 | −5 | 42 |
| 8 | Szombathelyi Haladás | 33 | 11 | 5 | 17 | 35 | 50 | −15 | 38 |
| 9 | Mezőkövesd | 33 | 9 | 10 | 14 | 35 | 52 | −17 | 37 |
| 10 | Diósgyőr | 33 | 10 | 6 | 17 | 44 | 53 | −9 | 36 |

Source: Hungarian Football Federation (in Hungarian), Soccerway
Rules for classification: 1) Points; 2) Matches won; 3) Goal difference; 4) Goals scored; 5) Head-to-head points; 6) Head-to-head goal difference; 7) Head-to-head away goals scored; 8) Fair play ranking; 9) Drawing of lots.

==== Results summary ====
| Overall | | | | | | | | Home | | | | | | Away | | | | | |
| Pld | W | D | L | GF | GA | GD | Pts | W | D | L | GF | GA | GD | W | D | L | GF | GA | GD |
|---|---|---|---|---|---|---|---|---|---|---|---|---|---|---|---|---|---|---|---|
| 33 | 11 | 5 | 17 | 35 | 50 | −15 | 38 | 8 | 4 | 5 | 22 | 23 | −1 | 3 | 1 | 12 | 13 | 27 | −14 |

Source: HFF

==== Results by round ====
| Round | 1 | 2 | 3 | 4 | 5 | 6 | 7 | 8 | 9 | 10 | 11 | 12 | 13 | 14 | 15 | 16 | 17 | 18 | 19 | 20 | 21 | 22 | 23 | 24 | 25 | 26 | 27 | 28 | 29 | 30 | 31 | 32 | 33 |
|---|---|---|---|---|---|---|---|---|---|---|---|---|---|---|---|---|---|---|---|---|---|---|---|---|---|---|---|---|---|---|---|---|---|
| Ground | A | H | H | A | H | A | H | A | H | A | H | H | A | H | H | A | H | A | H | A | H | A | A | H | A | A | H | A | H | A | H | A | H |
| Result | L | W | L | L | W | L | L | L | W | L | D | L | D | L | L | L | W | W | W | L | W | L | L | D | W | W | D | L | W | L | D | L | W |
| Position | 11 | 5 | 7 | 10 | 7 | 8 | 10 | 11 | 10 | 10 | 10 | 10 | 10 | 10 | 11 | 11 | 11 | 11 | 10 | 11 | 9 | 10 | 11 | 11 | 9 | 7 | 8 | 8 | 8 | 8 | 9 | 9 | 8 |

Source: Matches
A = Away; H = Home; W = Win; D = Draw; L = Loss

==== Matches ====
| 15 July 2017 1 | Honvéd | 2–0 | Haladás | Budapest |
| 20:30 CEST (UTC+2) | Bobál 30'; Lanzafame 89' | (Report) | | Stadium: Bozsik József Stadion; Attendance: 2,090; Referee: József Erdős |

| 22 July 2017 2 | Haladás | 1–0 | Debrecen | Sopron |
| 20:30 CEST (UTC+2) | Williams 3' | (Report) | | Stadium: Káposztás utcai Stadion; Attendance: 1,260; Referee: Balázs Berke |

| 29 July 2017 3 | Haladás | 0–3 | Diósgyőr | Sopron |
| 18:00 CEST (UTC+2) | | (Report) | M. Tamás 60'; Óvári 75'; Busai 87' | Stadium: Káposztás utcai Stadion; Attendance: 1,544; Referee: Ádám Farkas |

| 5 August 2017 4 | Paks | 2–0 | Haladás | Paks |
| 20:00 CEST (UTC+2) | J. Szabó 57'; Bartha 62' | (Report) | | Stadium: Fehérvári úti Stadion; Attendance: 1,073; Referee: István Vad |

| 12 August 2017 5 | Haladás | 3–1 | Balmazújváros | Sopron |
| 18:00 CEST (UTC+2) | Williams 24' (pen.), 70'; M. Jagodics 78' | (Report) | Vajda 77' | Stadium: Káposztás utcai Stadion; Attendance: 1,162; Referee: Zsolt Szabó |

| 17 August 2017 6 | Ferencváros | 2–0 | Haladás | Budapest |
| 18:00 CEST (UTC+2) | Moutari 5'; Böde 82' | (Report) | | Stadium: Groupama Arena; Attendance: 4,911; Referee: Ferenc Karakó |

| 26 August 2017 7 | Haladás | 1–5 | Puskás Akadémia | Sopron |
| 18:00 CEST (UTC+2) | L. Kovács 15' | (Report) | G. Molnár 38'; Knežević 52' (pen.), 66'; Diallo 81', 89' | Stadium: Káposztás utcai Stadion; Attendance: 1,075; Referee: Ádám Farkas |

| 10 September 2017 8 | Videoton | 3–1 | Haladás | Felcsút |
| 17:00 CEST (UTC+2) | Lazović 52'; Pátkai 63'; Šćepović 90' | (Report) | Má. Németh 35' | Stadium: Pancho Aréna; Attendance: 1,771; Referee: Gergely Szőts |

| 16 September 2017 9 | Haladás | 1–0 | Újpest | Sopron |
| 18:00 CEST (UTC+2) | Williams 53' | (Report) | | Stadium: Káposztás utcai Stadion; Attendance: 1,710; Referee: József Erdős |

| 30 September 2017 11 | Haladás | 2–2 | Mezőkövesd | Sopron |
| 18:00 CEST (UTC+2) | Williams 4'; Polgár 60' | (Report) | Iszlai 28'; Koszta 81' | Stadium: Káposztás utcai Stadion; Attendance: 1,430; Referee: Zsolt Szabó |

| 14 October 2017 12 | Haladás | 1–2 | Honvéd | Sopron |
| 15:30 CEST (UTC+2) | T. Kiss 57' | (Report) | Eppel 45' (pen.), 84' | Stadium: Káposztás utcai Stadion; Attendance: 1,740; Referee: Sándor Andó-Szabó |

| 17 October 2017 10 | Vasas | 1–0 | Haladás | Budapest |
| 18:00 CEST (UTC+2) | Gaál 28' | (Report) | B. Kiss (yellow card) 43'; Medgyes (yellow card) 84' | Stadium: Szusza Ferenc Stadion; Attendance: 1,000; Referee: Gergely Szőts |
Note: The match was originally played on 23 September 2017, but was interrupted due to failure of illumination after 22 minutes of playing.

| 21 October 2017 13 | Debrecen | 1–1 | Haladás | Debrecen |
| 15:30 CEST (UTC+2) | Tabaković 69' | (Report) | T. Kiss 3' | Stadium: Nagyerdei Stadion; Attendance: 6,028; Referee: József Erdős |

| 28 October 2017 14 | Haladás | 0–3 | Diósgyőr | Sopron |
| 15:30 CET (UTC+1) | | (Report) | Lipták 50'; Ugrai 51'; Nono 69' | Stadium: Káposztás utcai Stadion; Attendance: 1,120; Referee: Ferenc Karakó |

| 4 November 2017 15 | Haladás | 1–2 | Paks | Sopron |
| 15:30 CET (UTC+1) | M. Tóth 90+2' | Report | Bartha 82'; J. Szabó 86' | Stadium: Káposztás utcai Stadion; Attendance: 1,100; Referee: József Erdős |

| 18 November 2017 16 | Balmazújváros | 2–1 | Haladás | Balmazújváros |
| 15:30 CET (UTC+1) | Fekete 61'; Sigér 79' | (Report) | Ramos 21' | Stadium: Városi Sportpálya; Attendance: 1,577; Referee: Viktor Kassai |

| 25 November 2017 17 | Haladás | 2–1 | Ferencváros | Szombathely |
| 19:30 CET (UTC+1) | Mészáros 32'; T. Kiss 84' | (Report) | Blažič 34' | Stadium: Haladás Sportkomplexum; Attendance: 8,028; Referee: Zsolt Szabó |

| 2 December 2017 18 | Puskás Akadémia | 1–3 | Haladás | Felcsút |
| 15:30 CET (UTC+1) | Szakály 3' | (Report) | Ramos 14' (pen.), 90+4'; Wils 59' | Stadium: Pancho Aréna; Attendance: 712; Referee: István Vad |

| 9 December 2017 19 | Haladás | 1–0 | Videoton | Szombathely |
| 15:30 CET (UTC+1) | Mészáros 90+2' | (Report) | | Stadium: Haladás Sportkomplexum; Attendance: 5,500; Referee: Viktor Kassai |

| 24 February 2018 20 | Újpest | 1–0 | Haladás | Budapest |
| 17:00 CET (UTC+1) | Novothny 52' | (Report) | | Stadium: Szusza Ferenc Stadium; Attendance: 2,050; Referee: Viktor Kassai |

| 3 March 2018 21 | Haladás | 3–0 | Vasas | Szombathely |
| 17:00 CET (UTC+1) | L. Kovács 27'; Rácz 48'; Ramos 60' | (Report) | | Stadium: Haladás Sportkomplexum; Attendance: 2,866; Referee: Balázs Berke |

| 10 March 2018 22 | Mezőkövesd | 2–1 | Haladás | Mezőkövesd |
| 17:00 CET (UTC+1) | Cseri 58'; Koszta 78' | (Report) | Wils 75' | Stadium: Városi Stadion; Attendance: 2,122; Referee: József Erdős |

| 17 March 2018 23 | Honvéd | 2–1 | Haladás | Budapest |
| 17:00 CET (UTC+1) | Bobál 43'; Danilo 90+3' | (Report) | M. Jagodics 61' | Stadium: Bozsik József Stadion; Attendance: 1,212; Referee: Zoltán Iványi |

| 31 March 2018 24 | Haladás | 1–1 | Debrecen | Szombathely |
| 19:30 CEST (UTC+2) | Rabušic 60' | (Report) | Könyves 23' | Stadium: Haladás Sportkomplexum; Attendance: 3,133; Referee: Viktor Kassai |

| 7 April 2017 25 | Diósgyőr | 1–2 | Haladás | Mezőkövesd |
| 17:00 CEST (UTC+2) | Ugrai 61' | Report | Mészáros 20'; L. Kovács 49' | Stadium: Városi Stadion; Attendance: 1,472; Referee: Ferenc Karakó |

| 14 April 2018 26 | Paks | 1–2 | Haladás | Paks |
| 17:00 CEST (UTC+2) | A. Simon 71' | (Report) | Hahn 11' (o.g.); Grumić 70' | Stadium: Fehérvári úti Stadion; Attendance: 500; Referee: Balázs Berke |

| 21 April 2018 27 | Haladás | 0–0 | Balmazújváros | Szombathely |
| 17:00 CEST (UTC+2) | | (Report) | | Stadium: Haladás Sportkomplexum; Attendance: 4,716; Referee: József Erdős |

| 28 April 2018 28 | Ferencváros | 2–1 | Haladás | Budapest |
| 19:30 CEST (UTC+2) | Paintsil 38'; Blažič 68' | (Report) | Williams 7' | Stadium: Groupama Arena; Attendance: 7,872; Referee: Gergely Szőts |

| 5 May 2018 29 | Haladás | 3–2 | Puskás Akadémia | Szombathely |
| 17:00 CEST (UTC+2) | Mészáros 13'; Wils 71'; Williams 71' | (Report) | Henty 8' (pen.), 82' | Stadium: Haladás Sportkomplexum; Attendance: 4,133; Referee: Sándor Andó-Szabó |

| 12 May 2018 30 | Videoton | 3–0 | Haladás | Felcsút |
| 17:00 CEST (UTC+2) | Nikolov 19'; Nego 61'; Pátkai 86' | (Report) | | Stadium: Pancho Aréna; Attendance: 1,977; Referee: Viktor Kassai |

| 19 May 2018 31 | Haladás | 1–1 | Újpest | Szombathely |
| 17:00 CEST (UTC+2) | Má. Németh 9' | (Report) | Zsótér 49' | Stadium: Haladás Sportkomplexum; Attendance: 5,882; Referee: József Erdős |

| 27 May 2018 32 | Vasas | 1–0 | Haladás | Budapest |
| 17:00 CEST (UTC+2) | Pavlov 90' | (Report) | | Stadium: Szusza Ferenc Stadion; Attendance: 1,500; Referee: Zoltán Iványi |

| 2 June 2018 33 | Haladás | 1–0 | Mezőkövesd | Szombathely |
| 19:00 CEST (UTC+2) | T. Kiss 89' | (Report) | | Stadium: Haladás Sportkomplexum; Attendance: 6,743; Referee: Ádám Farkas |

=== Hungarian Cup ===
| 20 September 2017 Round of 128 | Szarvaskend | 0–6 | Haladás | Szarvaskend |
| 15:00 CEST (UTC+2) | | Report | Medgyes 3'; Mészáros 18' 30'; B. Tóth 21'; Rácz 43'; Grumić 90' | Stadium: Szarvaskendi Sportpálya; Attendance: 300; Referee: Annamária Tolnay |

| 24 October 2017 Round of 64 | Tiszaújváros | 1–1 (a.e.t.) (3–1 p) | Haladás | Tiszaújváros |
| 13:30 CEST (UTC+2) | G. Illés 41' | Report | Schimmer 90' | Stadium: Tiszaújvárosi Sport Park; Attendance: 400; Referee: Roland Veizer |
| | Penalties |
| | P. Nagy (penalty scored); Zs. Pap (penalty scored); A. Márton (penalty scored) | | Petró (penalty scored); Má. Németh (penalty missed); M. Jagodics (penalty missed); Kovalovszki (penalty missed) |
