= 2016–17 Szombathelyi Haladás season =

Szombathelyi Haladás
2016–17 season
- Chairman: (Hungary) Béla Illés
- Manager: (Hungary) Géza Mészöly
- NB 1: 6th
- Hungarian Cup: Round 3
- Top goalscorer: League: (Australia) David Williams (11); All: (Australia) David Williams (11)
- Highest home attendance: 4,138 vs Ferencváros (15 October 2016)
- Lowest home attendance: 1,147 vs DVSC (26 November 2016)
Home colours	Away colours

The 2016–17 season was Szombathelyi Haladás's 61st competitive season, 9th consecutive season in the OTP Bank Liga and 97th year in existence as a football club.

== Players ==
As of 14 June 2014. Note: Flags indicate national team as defined under FIFA eligibility rules; some limited exceptions apply. Players may hold more than one non-FIFA nationality.

No.	Pos.	Nation	Player
1	GK	HUN	Gábor Király
4	DF	HUN	Gábor Jánvári
6	DF	BEL	Stef Wils
8	FW	NGA	Funsho Bamgboye
9	FW	HUN	Zsolt Gajdos
10	FW	SVK	Karol Mészáros (loan from Debreceni VSC)
11	FW	AUS	David Williams
12	MF	HUN	Bence Kiss
13	DF	HUN	Kristóf Polgár
15	MF	HUN	Bence Iszlai
16	MF	HUN	Barnabás Rácz
17	FW	HUN	András Winkler
20	MF	HUN	Gergő Dombi
21	FW	HUN	Tamás Kiss
23	DF	HUN	Szabolcs Schimmer

No.	Pos.	Nation	Player
26	DF	HUN	Márk Jagodics
27	MF	HUN	Lóránt Kovács
28	MF	HUN	Dániel Szőke
31	MF	HUN	Márió Németh
33	DF	HUN	Szilárd Devecseri
35	DF	HUN	Predrag Bošnjak
42	GK	HUN	Gergely Lévay
44	GK	HUN	Márton Gyurján
66	GK	HUN	Dániel Rózsa
70	DF	HUN	András Jancsó
79	MF	HUN	Péter Halmosi (captain)
83	DF	HUN	Sándor Hidvégi
88	MF	NED	Sjoerd Overgoor
98	MF	HUN	Tóth Máté
99	FW	HUN	Kevin Varga

Players transferred during the season Note: Flags indicate national team as defined under FIFA eligibility rules; some limited exceptions apply. Players may hold more than one non-FIFA nationality.

No.	Pos.	Nation	Player
—	DF	HUN	Zsolt Angyal
—	DF	HUN	János Hegedűs
—	MF	ESP	Ezequiel Calvente
—	FW	NED	Sjoerd Ars
—	FW	HUN	Bálint Gaál

=== Summer ===
In: Note: Flags indicate national team as defined under FIFA eligibility rules; some limited exceptions apply. Players may hold more than one non-FIFA nationality.

No.	Pos.	Nation	Player
—	GK	HUN	Gergely Lévay (from (Austria) SV Eberau)
—	DF	HUN	János Hegedűs (loan return from Budaörsi SC)
—	DF	HUN	Péter Grabant (loan return from Soproni VSE)
—	DF	HUN	Kristóf Polgár (from Liverpool U21)
—	DF	HUN	Sándor Hidvégi (from Szigetszentmiklósi TK)
—	MF	ESP	Ezequiel Calvente (loan from Békéscsaba 1912 Előre)
—	MF	HUN	Bence Grabant (loan return from Soproni VSE)
—	MF	HUN	Barnabás Rácz (loan return from Soproni VSE)
—	MF	HUN	András Jancsó (loan return from Soproni VSE)
—	MF	HUN	Martin Tóth (loan return from Soproni VSE)
—	MF	NED	Sjoerd Overgoor (from (Netherlands) SC Cambuur)
—	MF	HUN	Máté Tóth (from Illés Akadémia)
—	MF	HUN	Dániel Szőke (from Illés Akadémia)
—	MF	HUN	Gergő Dombi (from Illés Akadémia)
—	MF	HUN	Soma Szellák (from Dunaújváros PASE)
—	FW	HUN	Olivér Tihanyi (loan return from Soproni VSE)
—	FW	HUN	Milán Török (loan return from Sárvár FC)
—	FW	NED	Sjoerd Ars (from (Netherlands) NAC Breda)

Out: Note: Flags indicate national team as defined under FIFA eligibility rules; some limited exceptions apply. Players may hold more than one non-FIFA nationality.

No.	Pos.	Nation	Player
—	DF	HUN	Szilárd Devecseri (loan to Mezőkövesd-Zsóry SE)
—	DF	HUN	Péter Grabant (loan to Dorogi FC)
—	DF	HUN	Zoltán Fehér (loan to Soproni VSE)
—	DF	HUN	Máté Katona (to released)
—	MF	CRO	Ante Batarelo (to (Croatia) NK Solin)
—	MF	HUN	Patrik Nagy (loan to Soproni VSE)
—	MF	HUN	Gergő Gyürki (loan to Soproni VSE)
—	MF	HUN	Soma Szellák (loan to Soproni VSE)
—	MF	BEL	Thomas Wils (to (Belgium) Lierse SK)
—	MF	HUN	Bence Grabant (loan to Dorogi FC)
—	MF	HUN	András Jancsó (loan to Gyirmót SE)
—	MF	HUN	Balázs Petró (loan to Budaörsi SC)
—	MF	HUN	Martin Tóth (loan to Dorogi FC)
—	MF	HUN	Ádám Dudás (to ETO FC Győr)
—	FW	ROU	Sasa Popin (loan to Soproni VSE)
—	FW	HUN	Roland Ugrai (to Diósgyőri VTK)
—	FW	HUN	Zoltán Medgyes (loan to Dorogi FC)
—	FW	HUN	Géza Garda (loan to Soproni VSE)
—	FW	HUN	Bence Soós (loan to Soproni VSE)
—	FW	HUN	Olivér Tihanyi (loan to Várda SE)
—	FW	ITA	Leandro Martínez (loan to (Italy) A.S. Lucchese Libertas 1905)
—	FW	HUN	Milán Török (loan to Szolnoki MÁV FC)

=== Winter ===
In: Note: Flags indicate national team as defined under FIFA eligibility rules; some limited exceptions apply. Players may hold more than one non-FIFA nationality.

No.	Pos.	Nation	Player
—	DF	HUN	Szilárd Devecseri (return loan from Mezőkövesd-Zsóry SE)
—	MF	HUN	András Jancsó (return loan from Gyirmót SE)
—	MF	HUN	Bence Kiss (from Illés Akadémia)
—	FW	HUN	Tamás Kiss (from Illés Akadémia)
—	FW	NGA	Funsho Bamgboye (from (Qatar) Aspire Academy)
—	FW	ITA	Leandro Martínez (return loan from (Italy) A.S. Lucchese Libertas 1905)
—	FW	ROU	Sasa Popin (return loan from Soproni VSE)
—	FW	SVK	Karol Mészáros (loan from Debreceni VSC)
—	FW	HUN	Zsolt Gajdos (from Puskás Akadémia FC)

Out: Note: Flags indicate national team as defined under FIFA eligibility rules; some limited exceptions apply. Players may hold more than one non-FIFA nationality.

No.	Pos.	Nation	Player
—	DF	HUN	Zsolt Angyal (loan to Zalaegerszegi TE)
—	DF	HUN	János Hegedűs (to Puskás Akadémia FC)
—	MF	ESP	Ezequiel Calvente (loan return to Békéscsaba)
—	FW	ITA	Leandro Martínez (loan to MTK Budapest)
—	FW	NED	Sjoerd Ars (to (Netherlands) Fortuna Sittard)
—	FW	HUN	Bálint Gaál (to Vasas SC)

== Nemzeti Bajnokság I ==
=== League table ===
Pos	Team	Pld	W	D	L	GF	GA	GD	Pts	Qualification or relegation
4	Ferencváros	33	14	10	9	54	44	+10	52	Qualification for the Europa League first qualifying round (Note: Ferencváros qualified for the Europa League first qualifying round by winning the 2016–17 Magyar Kupa.)
5	Paks	33	11	12	10	41	37	+4	45	
6	Haladás	33	12	7	14	42	46	−4	43	
7	Újpest	33	10	12	11	47	51	−4	42	
8	Debrecen	33	11	8	14	42	46	−4	41	

Source: Hungarian Football Federation (in Hungarian), Soccerway
Rules for classification: 1) Points; 2) Matches won; 3) Goal difference; 4) Goals scored; 5) Head-to-head points; 6) Head-to-head goal difference; 7) Head-to-head away goals scored; 8) Fairplay; 9) Draw.

=== Matches ===
16 July 2016 1	Ferencváros	3 – 1	Haladás	Budapest, Pest County
20:30 CEST	Trinks 3'; Böde 7' 36'	(Report)	Iszlai 52' (pen.)	Stadium: Groupama Arena; Attendance: 5,642; Referee: (Hungary) Péter Solymosi

23 July 2016 2	Haladás	1 – 1	Mezőkövesd	Sopron, Győr-Moson-Sopron County
18:00 CEST	Rácz B. 7'	(Report)	Gohér 41'	Stadium: Káposztás utcai Stadion; Attendance: 1,225; Referee: (Hungary) Sándor Andó-Szabó

30 July 2016 3	Haladás	1 – 1	Budapest Honvéd	Sopron, Győr-Moson-Sopron County
18:00 CEST	Hajdú Á. 74' (o.g.)	(Report)	Bošnjak 76' (o.g.)	Stadium: Káposztás utcai Stadion; Attendance: 1,187; Referee: (Hungary) István Vad

7 August 2016 4	MTK	0 – 2	Haladás	Dunaújváros, Fejér County
18:00 CET		(Report)	Hegedűs J. 38'; Williams 59'	Stadium: Dunaferr Arena; Attendance: 316; Referee: (Hungary) Zoltán Iványi

13 August 2016 5	Haladás	3 – 1	DVTK	Sopron, Győr-Moson-Sopron County
18:00 CEST	Williams 3'; Németh M. 20'; Rácz B. 42'	(Report)	Lipták 74'	Stadium: Káposztás utcai Stadion; Attendance: 1,768; Referee: (Hungary) Balázs Berke

17 August 2016 6	Debrecen	0 – 1	Haladás	Debrecen, Hajdú-Bihar County
18:00 CEST		(Report)	Williams 60'	Stadium: Nagyerdei Stadion; Attendance: 2,367; Referee: (Hungary) József Erdős

21 August 2016 7	Haladás	3 – 1	Paks	Sopron, Győr-Moson-Sopron County
18:00 CEST	Gaál B. 27'; Williams 68'; Gévay 71' (o.g.)	(Report)	Koltai 14' (pen.)	Stadium: Káposztás utcai Stadion; Attendance: 1,375; Referee: (Hungary) Ferenc Karakó

10 September 2016 8	Videoton	3 – 0	Haladás	Felcsút, Fejér County
18:00 CEST	Stopira 51'; Feczesin 72'; Géresi K. 90'	(Report)		Stadium: Pancho Arena; Attendance: 2,183; Referee: (Hungary) Péter Solymosi

17 September 2016 9	Haladás	1 – 0	Vasas	Sopron, Győr-Moson-Sopron County
18:00 CEST	Iszlai 61'	(Report)		Stadium: Káposztás utcai Stadion; Attendance: 2,136; Referee: (Hungary) Balázs Berke

21 September 2016 10	Újpest	1 – 1	Haladás	Budapest, Pest County
19:00 CEST	Wils 18' (o.g.)	(Report)	Wils 61'	Stadium: Szusza Ferenc Stadium; Attendance: 2,500; Referee: (Hungary) Gergely Szőts

24 September 2016 11	Haladás	0 – 1	Gyirmót FC Győr	Sopron, Győr-Moson-Sopron County
18:00 CEST		(Report)	Sallói D. 41'	Stadium: Káposztás utcai Stadion; Attendance: 1,485; Referee: (Hungary) Zoltán Iványi

15 October 2016 12	Haladás	2 – 0	Ferencváros	Sopron, Győr-Moson-Sopron County
18:00 CEST	Gaál B. 63'; Iszlai 83'	(Report)		Stadium: Káposztás utcai Stadion; Attendance: 4,138; Referee: (Hungary) Péter Solymosi

22 October 2016 13	Mezőkövesd	3 – 0	Haladás	Mezőkövesd, Borsod-Abaúj-Zemplén County
18:00 CEST	Diallo 38' 50'; Molnár G. 59'	(Report)		Stadium: Mezőkövesdi Városi Stadion; Attendance: 1,500; Referee: (Hungary) Zsolt Szabó

29 October 2016 14	Honvéd	2 – 1	Haladás	Budapest, Pest County
15:30 CET	Lanzafame 42' (pen.); Prosser 44'	(Report)	Gaál B. 45+3'	Stadium: Bozsik Stadion; Attendance: 2,832; Referee: (Hungary) József Erdős

5 November 2016 15	Haladás	1 – 1	MTK	Sopron, Győr-Moson-Sopron County
15:30 CET	Gaál B. 11'	(Report)	Torghelle 14'	Stadium: Káposztás utcai Stadion; Attendance: 1,265; Referee: (Hungary) Ferenc Karakó

19 November 2016 16	DVTK	2 – 1	Haladás	Debrecen, Hajdú-Bihar County
15:30 CET	Lipták 67'; Ugrai 92'	(Report)	Gaál B. 13'	Stadium: Nagyerdei Stadion; Attendance: 1,033; Referee: (Hungary) József Erdős

26 November 2016 17	Haladás	1 – 0	Debrecen	Sopron, Győr-Moson-Sopron County
15:30 CET	Ars 53'	(Report)		Stadium: Káposztás utcai Stadion; Attendance: 1,147; Referee: (Hungary) Zsolt Szabó

3 December 2016 18	Paks	2 – 1	Haladás	Paks, Tolna County
15:30 CET	Koltai 13' (pen.); Szakály D. 60'	(Report)	Gaál B. 38'	Stadium: Stadion PSE; Attendance: 927; Referee: (Hungary) Péter Solymosi

10 December 2016 19	Haladás	1 – 1	Videoton	Sopron, Győr-Moson-Sopron County
15:30 CET	Gaál B. 57'	(Report)	Šćepović 16'	Stadium: Káposztás utcai Stadion; Attendance: 1,410; Referee: (Hungary) István Vad

16 March 2017 20	Vasas	2 – 3	Haladás	Budapest, Pest County
17:30 CET	Ristevski 47'; Sağlık 83'	(Report)	Williams 25' 70'; Kovács L. 51'	Stadium: Szusza Ferenc Stadium; Attendance: 1,490; Referee: (Hungary) Balázs Berke

25 February 2017 21	Haladás	0 – 2	Újpest	Sopron, Győr-Moson-Sopron County
15:30 CET		(Report)	M.Perović 13'; Szűcs K. 90+2'	Stadium: Káposztás utcai Stadion; Attendance: 1,834; Referee: (Hungary) Sándor Andó-Szabó

4 March 2017 22	Gyirmót FC Győr	1 – 2	Haladás	Győr, Győr-Moson-Sopron County
15:30 CET	A. Radeljić 85'	(Report)	Halmosi 6'; Kovács L. 36'	Stadium: Ménfői út Attendance: 1,010; Referee: (Hungary) István Vad

11 March 2017 23	Ferencváros	3 – 1	Haladás	Budapest, Pest County
18:00 CET	Moutari 1'; Gera 19' (pen.); Böde 43'	(Report)	Jancsó 69'	Stadium: Groupama Arena; Attendance: 6,983; Referee: (Hungary) Gergely Szőts

1 April 2017 24	Haladás	4 – 2	Mezőkövesd	Sopron, Győr-Moson-Sopron County
18:00 CEST	S. Wils 15'; Iszlai 48' (pen.); Kovács L. 62'; Williams 67'	(Report)	Molnár G. 38'; Baracskai 90'	Stadium: Káposztás utcai Stadion; Attendance: 1,565; Referee: (Hungary) Gergely Szőts

8 April 2017 25	Haladás	0 – 1	Budapest Honvéd	Sopron, Győr-Moson-Sopron County
18:00 CEST		(Report)	Eppel 88'	Stadium: Káposztás utcai Stadion; Attendance: 2,130; Referee: (Hungary) József Erdős

12 April 2016 26	MTK	0 – 0	Haladás	Budapest, Pest County
18:00 CEST		(Report)		Stadium: Hidegkuti Nándor Stadium; Attendance: 1,364; Referee: (Hungary) Péter Solymosi

15 April 2017 27	Haladás	2 – 0	DVTK	Sopron, Győr-Moson-Sopron County
18:00 CEST	Jancsó 27'; Williams 79'	(Report)		Stadium: Káposztás utcai Stadion; Attendance: 1,774; Referee: (Hungary) István Vad

22 April 2017 28	Debrecen	4 – 2	Haladás	Debrecen, Hajdú-Bihar County
18:00 CEST	Handžić 27'; Holman 25' 33'; Könyves 61'	(Report)	Williams 24'; Tóth M. 87'	Stadium: Nagyerdei Stadion; Attendance: 2,039; Referee: (Hungary) Balázs Berke

29 April 2017 29	Haladás	2 – 0	Paks	Sopron, Győr-Moson-Sopron County
18:00 CEST	Jancsó 14'; Iszlai 71'	(Report)		Stadium: Káposztás utcai Stadion; Attendance: 1,445; Referee: (Hungary) Sándor Andó-Szabó

6 May 2017 30	Videoton	2 – 0	Haladás	Felcsút, Fejér County
18:00 CEST	Nego 16'; Géresi K. 86'	(Report)		Stadium: Pancho Arena; Attendance: 2,058; Referee: (Hungary) Péter Solymosi

13 May 2017 31	Haladás	2 – 2	Vasas	Sopron, Győr-Moson-Sopron County
18:00 CEST	Iszlai 47' (pen.); Schimmer 89'	(Report)	Burmeister 35'; Gaál B. 72'	Stadium: Káposztás utcai Stadion; Attendance: 2,435; Referee: (Hungary) István Vad

20 May 2017 32	Újpest	2 – 1	Haladás	Budapest, Pest County
18:00 CEST	Balogh B. 21'; Bardhi 86'	(Report)	Williams 71' (pen.)	Stadium: Szusza Ferenc Stadium; Attendance: 2,050; Referee: (Hungary) József Erdős

27 May 2017 33	Haladás	1 – 2	Gyirmót FC Győr	Sopron, Győr-Moson-Sopron County
19:00 CEST	Williams 65' (pen.)	(Report)	Szegi V. 7'; Máté J. 72'	Stadium: Káposztás utcai Stadion; Attendance: 1,785; Referee: (Hungary) Szabolcs Szilasi

== Hungarian Cup ==
14 September 2016 Round 1	Füzesgyarmati SK	0 – 2	Haladás	Füzesgyarmat, Békés County
15:30 CEST		Report	Tóth M. 5'; Ars 49'	Stadium: Lázár Gyula Sporttelep; Attendance: 700; Referee: (Hungary) Balázs Böcskei

26 October 2016 Round 2	Vác FC	0 – 3	Haladás	Dunaújváros, Fejér County
13:30 CEST		Report	Tóth M. 2'; Ars 68' 80'	Stadium: Dunaferr Arena; Attendance: 30; Referee: (Hungary) Gergő Bogár

30 November 2016 Round 3	Érdi VSE	3 – 3 (5-3 p)	Haladás	Érd, Pest County
12:00 CET	Kelemen P. 13' 96'; Csizmadia Z. 90+3'	Report	Ars 47' 78'; Iszlai 111'	Stadium: Érdi VSE Sporttelep; Attendance: 300; Referee: (Hungary) Szabolcs Szilasi
	Penalties
	Kelemen P. (penalty scored); Honti (penalty scored); Palásthy (penalty scored); Melczer (penalty scored); Kertész F. (penalty scored)		Iszlai (penalty scored); Kovács L. (penalty missed); Gaál B. (penalty scored); Ars (penalty scored)

== Friendly games (2016) ==
22 June 2016	Szombathelyi Haladás	0 – 1	FC Dynamo Moscow (Russia)	Bad Wimsbach-Neydharting, Upper Austria
15:15 CEST (UTC+02)		(Report)	Bećiraj 78' (pen.)	Attendance: 50; Referee: (Austria) Koch

26 June 2016	SK Rapid Wien (Austria)	1 – 0	Szombathelyi Haladás	Grieskirchen, Upper Austria
16:00 CEST (UTC+02)	Murg 71'	(Report)		Attendance: 400; Referee: (Austria)

29 June 2016	Szombathelyi Haladás	1 – 1	FC Stal Dniprodzerzhynsk (Ukraine)	Unterschützen, Oberwart District
18:00 CEST (UTC+02)	Williams 23'	(Report)	Boy Deul 82'	Attendance: 200; Referee: (Austria) Gerst

2 July 2016 Király kupa	Szombathelyi Haladás	0 – 1	Soproni VSE	Szombathely, Vas County
14:00 CEST (UTC+02)		(Report)	Zamostny 53'	Stadium: Király Sportlétesítmény; Attendance: 300; Referee: (Hungary) Norbert Kiss

2 July 2016 Király kupa	Szombathelyi Haladás	6 – 1	ASV Draßburg (Austria)	Szombathely, Vas County
17:30 CEST (UTC+02)	Williams 18' 33' (pen.) 36' 50'; Iszlai 23' (pen.); Calvente 27'	(Report)	M. Takacs 9' (pen.)	Stadium: Király Sportlétesítmény; Attendance: 300; Referee: (Hungary) Attila Molnár

9 July 2016	Szombathelyi Haladás	0 – 2	FC Terek Grozny (Russia)	Bad Tatzmannsdorf, Oberwart District
18:00 CEST (UTC+02)		(Report)	Balaj 14'; Grozav 63'	Attendance: 200; Referee: (Austria)

2 August 2016	Szombathelyi Haladás	0 – 0	Kasımpaşa S.K. (Turkey)	Wien
17:30 CEST (UTC+02)		(Report)		Stadium: Wienerberger Arena; Attendance: 100; Referee: (Austria) Cadikovsky

2 September 2016	Szombathelyi Haladás	4 – 1	Ferencvárosi TC	Balatonfüred, Veszprém County
16:00 CEST (UTC+02)	Williams 8'; Ars 56' (pen.); Dombi G. 60'; Molnár T. 80'	(Report)	Trinks 65'	Stadium: Balatonfüredi Városi Sportpálya; Attendance: Behind closed doors Referee: (Hungary) Attila Molnár

7 October 2016	NK Maribor (Slovenia)	0 – 3	Szombathelyi Haladás	Murska Sobota, Slovenia
15:00 CEST (UTC+02)		(Report)	Gaál B. 13'; Dombi G. 74'; Rácz B. 80'	Attendance: 50; Referee: (Slovenia) Bojan Mertik

11 October 2016	Sturm Graz (Austria)	4 – 3	Szombathelyi Haladás	Graz, Austria
15:00 CET (UTC+01)	Zulechner 6' 24'; Stanković 36'; Koch 45'	(Report)	Gaál B. 15' 83'; Kovács L. 57'	Stadium: Trainingszentrum Messendorf; Attendance: 300; Referee: (Austria)

== Friendly games (2017) ==
17 January 2017	SV Mattersburg (Austria)	2 – 0	Szombathelyi Haladás	Mattersburg, Burgenland
16:00 CET (UTC+01)	Maierhofer 21'; Rath 44'	(Report)		Stadium: Fußballakademie Burgenland; Attendance: 100; Referee: (Austria) Lesar

21 January 2017 Arena Cup	Szombathelyi Haladás	1 – 0	HNK Cibalia (Croatia)	Medulin, Istria County
11:00 CET (UTC+01)	Gajdos 54'	(Report)		Attendance: 50; Referee: (Croatia) Vidulin

24 January 2017 Arena Cup	Szombathelyi Haladás	1 – 0	FC Koper (Slovenia)	Medulin, Istria County
15:00 CET (UTC+01)	Williams 12'	(Report)		Attendance: 50; Referee: (Croatia)

27 January 2017 Arena Cup	Szombathelyi Haladás	0 – 1	NK Lokomotiva (Croatia)	Medulin, Istria County
11:00 CET (UTC+01)		(Report)	Lovrić 90'	Referee: (Croatia)

31 January 2017 Arena Cup	Szombathelyi Haladás	1 – 1 (1-4 p)	NK Inter Zaprešić (Croatia)	Medulin, Istria County
11:00 CET (UTC+01)	Iszlai 79' (pen.)	(Report)	F. Šiljić 7'	Referee: (Croatia)
	Penalties
	(penalty missed) Iszlai; (penalty missed) Calvente; (penalty scored) Gajdos		(penalty scored) Puljić; (penalty scored) Blažević; (penalty scored) Šarić; (penalty scored) K.Mesfin

3 February 2017	Szombathelyi Haladás	0 – 1	FK Austria Wien	Steinbrunn, Burgenland
15:00 CET (UTC+01)		(Report)	Venuto 6'	Referee: (Austria) Hartmann

11 February 2017	Videoton	1 – 0	Haladás	Felcsút, Fejér County
12:00 CET	Bódi 4'	(Report)		Attendance: Behind closed doors Referee: (Hungary) Németh Á.

24 March 2017	Soproni VSE	1 – 3	Szombathelyi Haladás	Sopron, Győr-Moson-Sopron County
11:00 CET (UTC+01)	Erdélyi 7' (pen.)	(Report)	Mészáros 6'; Szántó R. 47'; Szellák 73' (o.g.)	Stadium: Káposztás utcai Stadion; Attendance: 100; Referee: (Hungary)
