= Haladás Sportkomplexum =

Multi-purpose stadium in Szombathely, Hungary

Coordinates: 47.234762°N 16.607117°E

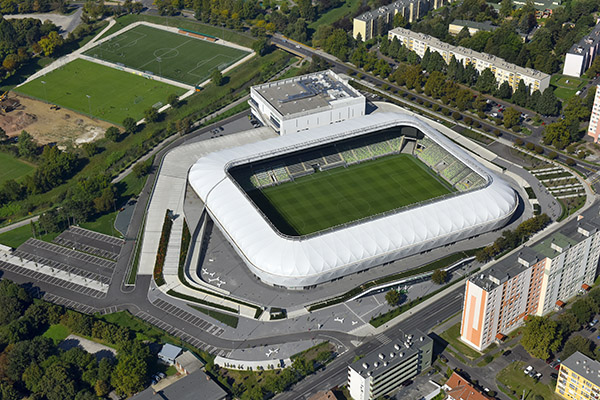
- UEFA
- Interactive map of Haladás Sportkomplexum
- Location: 3 Rohonci út, Szombathely, Hungary
- Owner: City of Szombathely
- Operator: Szilvia Szondy
- Capacity: 8,903
- Executive suites: 12 skyboxes
- Surface: Grass; Field
- Record attendance: TBD
- Field size: 105 m × 68 m (344 ft × 223 ft)

Construction
- Groundbreaking: 2016
- Built: 2016–2017
- Opened: 8 November 2017
- Cost: 15.6 billion HUF
- Architect: Péter Bordás
- Main contractor: ZÁÉV

Tenant
- Szombathelyi Haladás

Website
- Official website

Haladás Sportkomplexum (Hungarian: Haladás Sportkomplexum) is a multi-purpose stadium in Szombathely, Hungary. It replaced Szombathelyi Haladás's former stadium, Rohonci úti Stadion.

== History ==
=== Planning ===
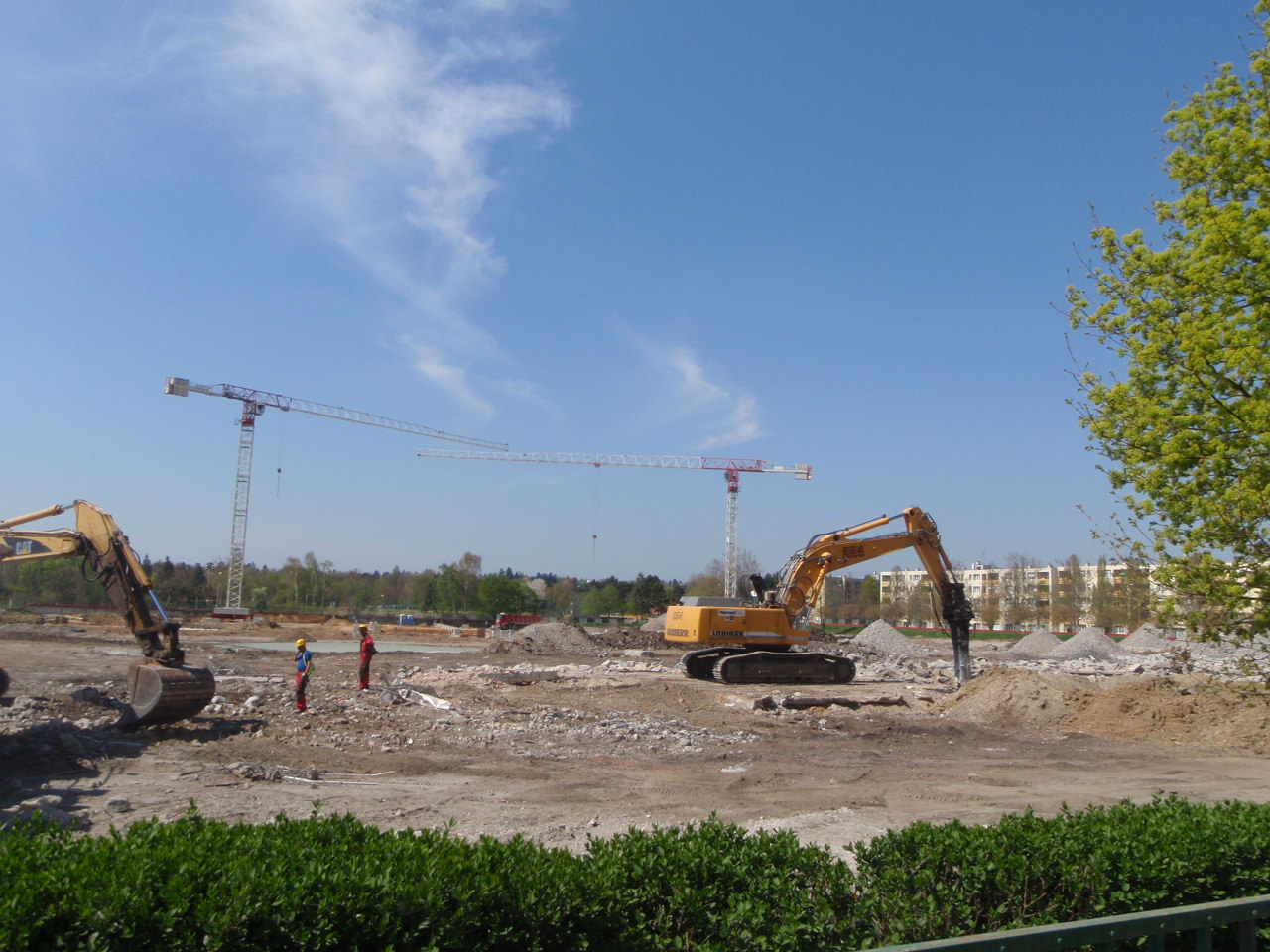
The area of the demolished stadium in April 2016

On 28 August 2013, Csaba Hende minister of Defense, said that the government will provide 9.6 billion Hungarian forints to build the new stadium. The new sports hall will be the home of the futsal team, wrestling, box, weight lifting, and chess.

On 6 September 2013, Csaba Hende, Member of the Hungarian Parliament and responsible for the Vas County, said that the preparation of the reconstruction started. The reconstruction team consulted with the Haladás Szurkoló Köre (Haladás Fans Club), presidents of the Haladás VSE, and The Student Association of Szombathely in order to enquire about the demand.

On 12 September 2013, Csaba Hende, Member of the Hungarian Parliament and responsible for the Vas County, said that the government will provide the 9.6 billion Hungarian forints to reconstruct the current stadium.

On 4 October 2013, Miklós Tóth, managing director of Szombathelyi Haladás, said that the club do not want to move from Szombathely during the reconstruction of the stadium. He said that the club do not want to play either in Sopron or in Oberwart since it would decrease the number of spectators. Therefore, Miklós Tóth asked some officials of the Hungarian Football Federation to check some turfs nearby which can be easily made into a temporary home stadium for the club.

On 26 September 2014, Tivadar Puskás, mayor of Szombathely and István Simicskó signed a contract which guarantees the construction of a new stadium to be built by 2016. The construction of the UEFA stadium category IV and sport complex will cost 9.6 billion Hungarian forints. The construction will be finished by September 2016.

On 30 September 2014, all the 17 Members of the Hungarian Parliament from Szombathely voted with yes to modify the deed of foundation of the Haladás Sportkomplexum Fejlesztő Nonprofit Limited liability company. The committee also elected a new managing director, Szilvia Szondy, for the limited. Szondy previously worked for the Nagyerdei Renonstrukciós Ltd, which was responsible for the construction of the Nagyerdei Stadion, in Debrecen. László Vigh, responsible and minister of the sport investments, said that the planning will last 7–8 months.

On 11 November 2014, it was revealed that Péter Bordás and his team are going to design the new stadium. Bordás was designer of the Nagyerdei Stadion, in Debrecen. The planning will take 8 months to complete. The construction will take 12–13 months. According to László Vigh, people will be able to celebrate the New Year's Eve at the new stadium in 2017.

On 29 January 2015, it was revealed that the capacity of the new UEFA IV category stadium will be 8,000. The new stadium will host the museum of the club, buffets, shop, skyboxes, V.I.P. and media sectors, as well. Next to the new stadium a sports hall will be built which will be able to host 500 spectators.

On 13 July 2015, new plans of the future stadium were released by Nemzeti Sport. Csaba Hende, minister of National Defense, said that the new stadium will be the home for the 12 departments of Haladás. He also said that the M86 motorway will make the stadium suitable for international events as well. Tivadar Puskás, mayor of Szombathely, said that the new stadium will be built by 2016. If Budapest will host the 2024 Summer Olympics, then the new stadium will host the 2024 Summer Olympics Women's football matches

On 12 December 2015, the last match was played at the old Rohonci út stadium.

=== Construction ===
On 11 April 2016, the construction of the new stadium was officially started. It is expected that the construction will be finished by July 2017.

By 25 October 2016 the construction of the eastern and the northern stands was completed.

On 10 February 2017, the construction of the main stand's roof started and an enigmatic message was made clear on one of the snow-covered ramps saying "ETO" referring to Győri ETO FC, the archrival of Szombathelyi Haladás.

On 27 February 2017, a video made by an unmanned aerial vehicle was issued about the construction of the new stadium.

On 3 April it was announced that the new stadium would be inaugurated on 16 or 17 September 2017. The cost of the inauguration ceremony will be 30 million HUF.

On 13 October 2017, Haladás Sportkomplexum Fejlesztő Nonprofit Kft announced that the new stadium would be opened on 8 November 2017. It was also pointed out that the new stadium was one of the biggest infrastructure improvements in the region during the previous 20 years . The final cost of the stadium was 15,2 billion HUF and it was financed by the Hungarian state. The proprietor of the stadium is the city of Szombathely.

=== Opening ===
The stadium opened 8 November 2017. The first match was between Szombathelyi Haladás VSE and Lőrinc Mészáros's Croatian NK Osijek. The match ended with a 3–1 victory for the home side. The first goal was scored by Haris Hajradinović in the 7th minute. The national anthem was played at 19:19 since the club was founded in 1919. The opening ceremony lasted an hour including the speech of Tünde Szabó, minister of Human Resources of Hungary.

On 20 November 2017, Miklós Tóth, managing director of Haladás, confirmed that the first Nemzeti Bajnokság I match would be played between Szombathelyi Haladás VSE and Ferencvárosi TC on the 17th match day of the 2017–18 Nemzeti Bajnokság I season at the new stadium. The tickets were going to be on sale from 21 November 2017.

On 25 November 2017, the first official match was played at the stadium. Haladás hosted Ferencvárosi TC on the 17th match day of the 2017–18 Nemzeti Bajnokság I season. The first goal at the stadium was scored by Karol Mészáros in the 32nd minute. The match ended with 2–1 victory for the home side.

=== Recent ===
The stadium was selected to host the 2021 UEFA European Under-21 Championship.

== Milestone matches ==
8 November 2017	Szombathelyi Haladás (Hungary)	3–1	(Croatia) Osijek	Opening match
	Ramos 17'; Grumić 86'; Petró 93'	Report	7' Hajradinović	Attendance: 8,700; Referee: Csaba Pintér (Hungary)

25 November 2017	Szombathelyi Haladás (Hungary)	2–1	(Hungary) Ferencváros	2017–18 Nemzeti Bajnokság I First match
	Mészáros 32'; Kiss 84'	(Report)	34' Blažič	Attendance: 8,028; Referee: Zsolt Szabó (Hungary)

== Attendances ==
As of 15 May 2019

This table includes only domestic league matches.

Season	Total	High	Low	Average	Change	Ref.
2017–18 NB/I (Note: Only eight league matches played at Haladás Sportkomplexum.)	40,409	8,028	2,866	5,051	—	
2018–19 NB/I	55,318	8,294	1,220	3,457	–31.6%	

== Gallery ==
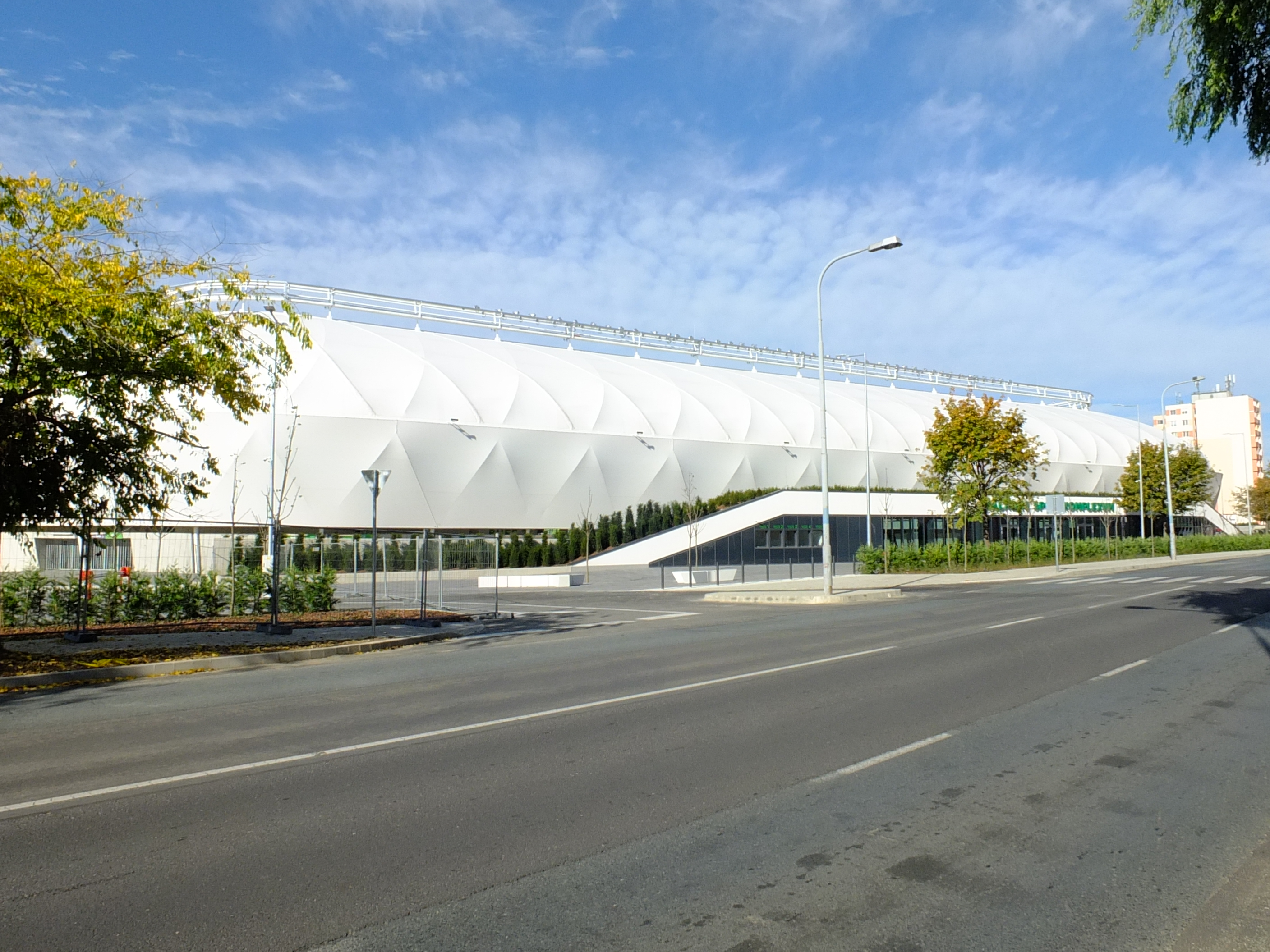
Exterior

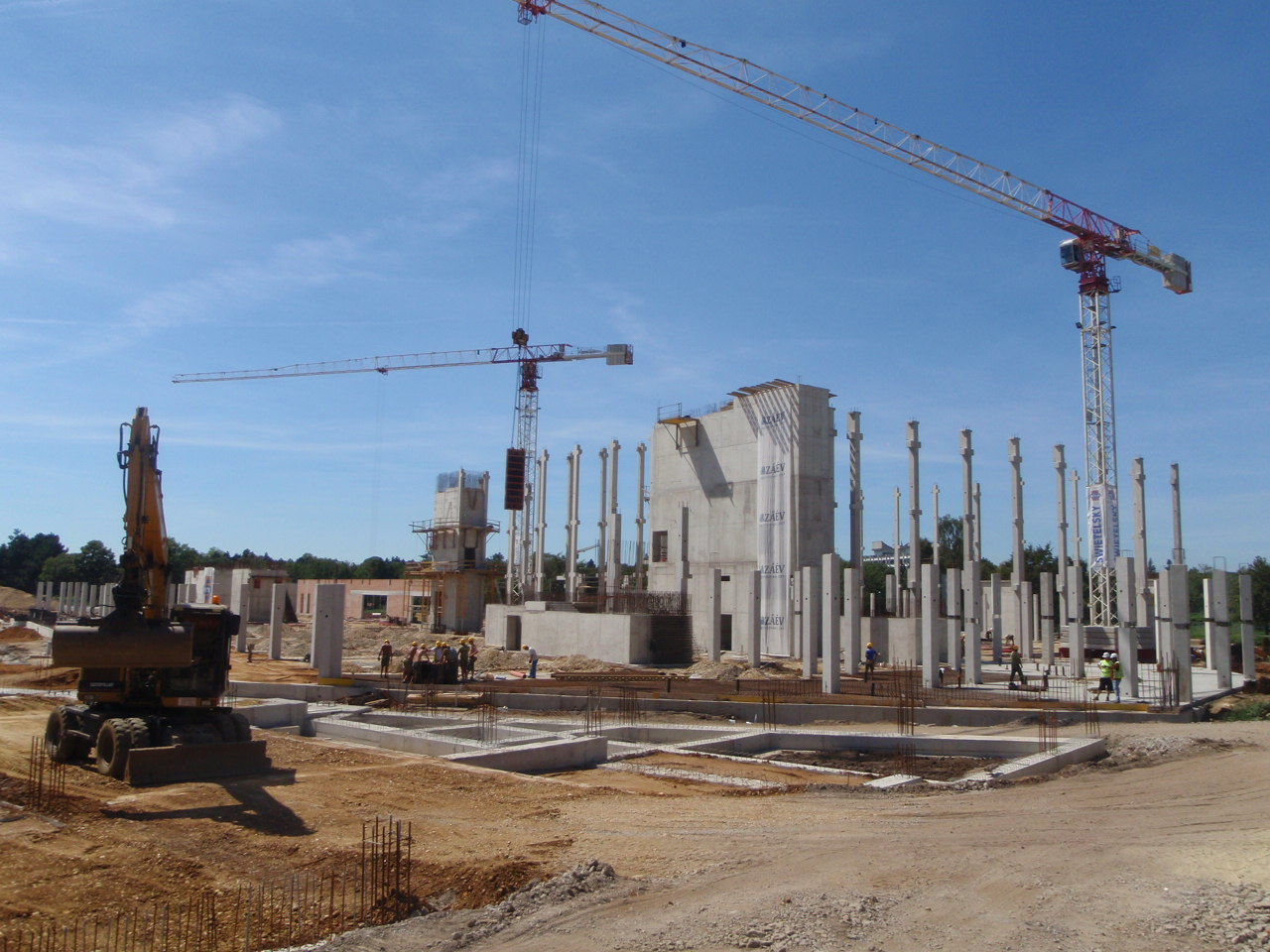
The plan of the multifunctional sports hall (August 2016)

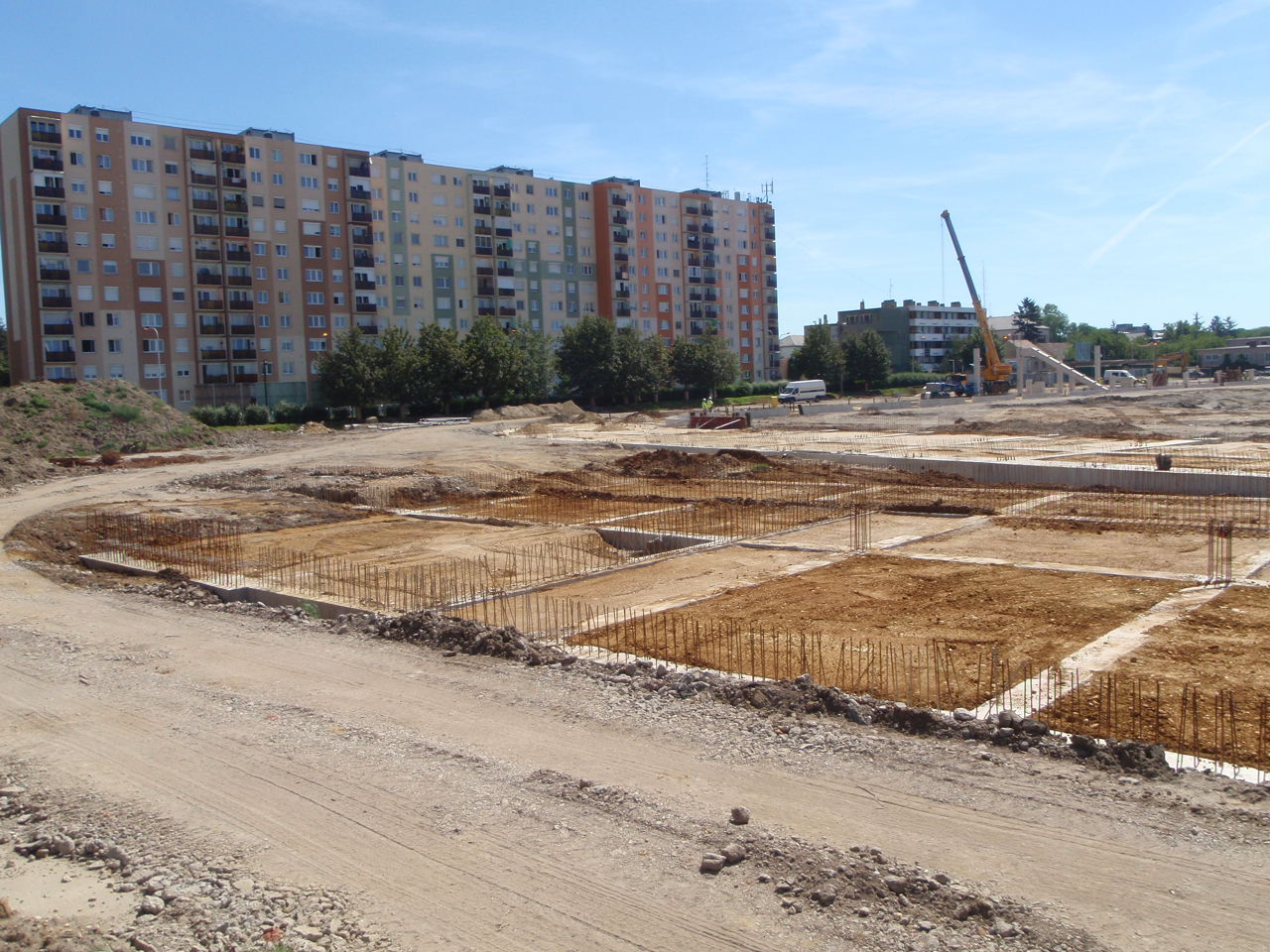
The stand under construction (in August 2016)

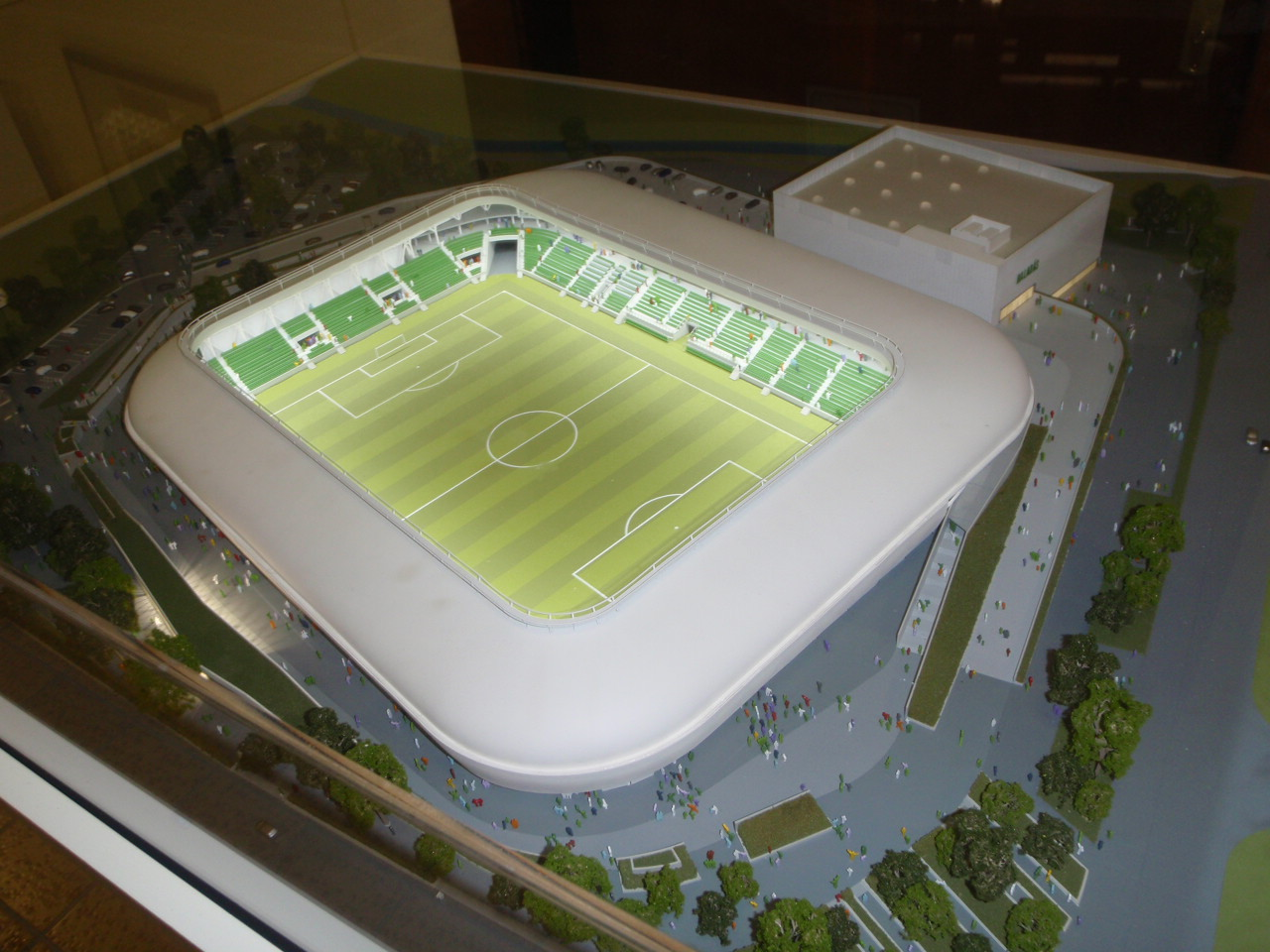
The plan of the stadium

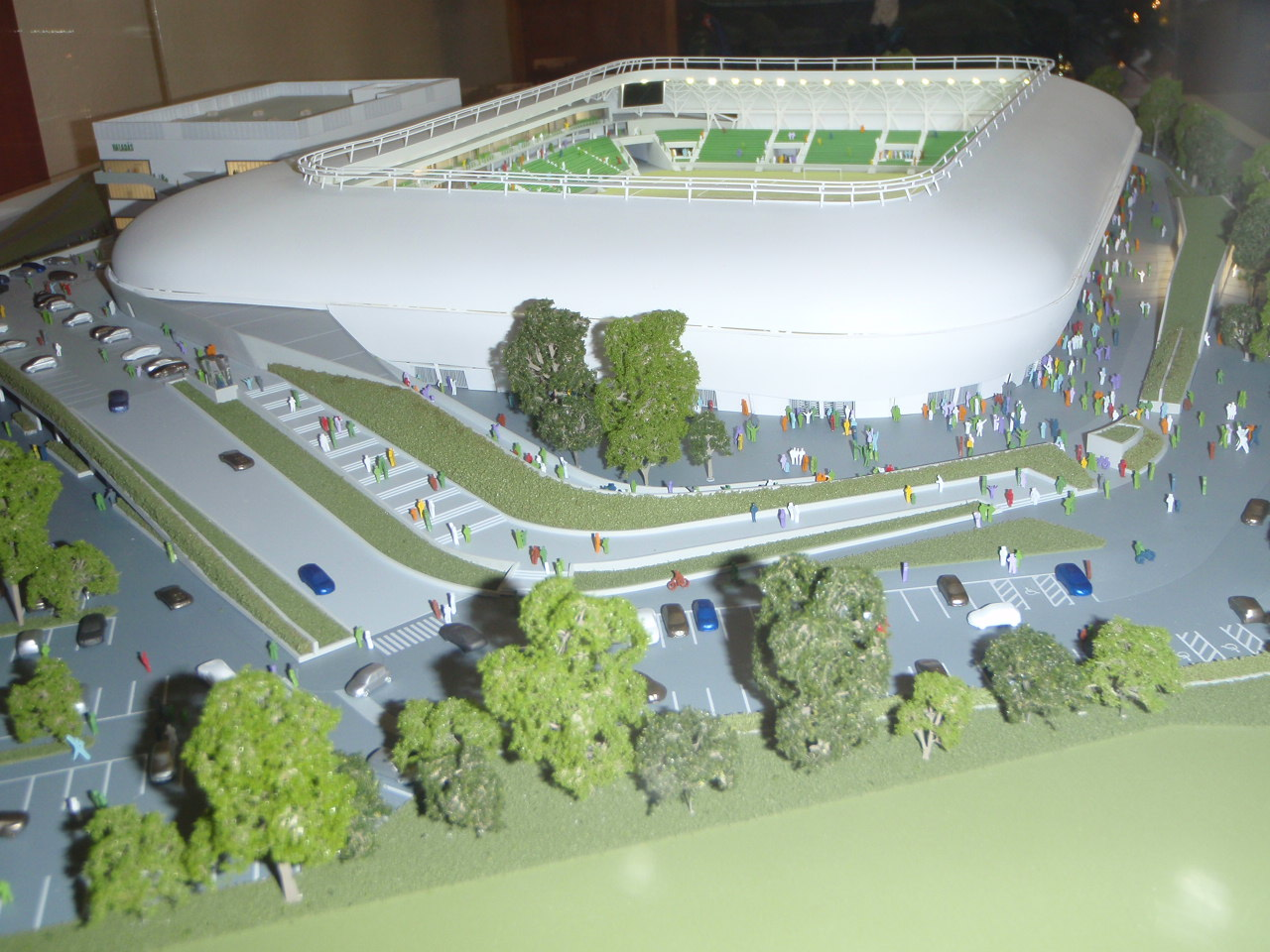
The plan of the stadium

== See also ==
- Szombathelyi Haladás
- Rohonci úti Stadion
- List of football stadiums in Hungary
