= Patrik Pinte =

Slovak footballer

Personal information
- Date of birth: 6 January 1997 (age 29)
- Place of birth: Dunajská Streda, Slovakia
- Height: 1.78 m (5 ft 10 in)
- Position: Forward

Team information
- Current team: Budapest Honvéd
- Number: 17

Youth career
- –2010: FC GBS Šamorín
- 2007–2009: → Šamorín (loan)
- 2009–2010: → Slovan Bratislava (loan)
- 2010–2016: Slovan Bratislava
- 2014–2015: → SFM Senec (loan)

Senior career*
Years	Team	Apps	(Gls)
2016–2017	Slovan Bratislava B	23	(2)
2017	Slovan Bratislava	5	(0)
2017–2021	Haládas Szombathely	8	(0)
2019–2020	→ Komárno (loan)	42	(6)
2020–2021	→ Šamorín (loan)	8	(0)
2021–2022	Tatran Liptovský Mikuláš	30	(2)
2022–2023	ViOn Zlaté Moravce	29	(1)
2023–2024	Kazincbarcika	31	(8)
2024–2025	Nyíregyháza	10	(0)
2025–	Budapest Honvéd	34	(3)
- * Club domestic league appearances and goals as of 31 May 2026

Patrik Pinte (born 6 January 1997) is a Slovak footballer who plays as a forward for Hungarian club Budapest Honvéd.

== Club career ==
=== Slovan Bratislava ===
Pinte made his professional Fortuna Liga debut for Slovan Bratislava on 5 March 2017 against Tatran Prešov.

=== ViOn Zlaté Moravce ===
After a year with debuting Tatran Liptovský Mikuláš in the Fortuna Liga, Pinte was approached by Ján Kocian and signed a one-year contract with an option for further year with ViOn Zlaté Moravce.
