= Kristián Kolčák =

Slovak footballer

Personal information
- Full name: Kristián Kolčák
- Date of birth: 30 January 1990 (age 36)
- Place of birth: Bratislava, Czechoslovakia
- Height: 1.83 m (6 ft 0 in)
- Positions: Centre-back; defensive midfielder

Youth career
- Inter Bratislava
- 2005–2007: Slovan Bratislava

Senior career*
| Years | Team | Apps | (Gls) |
| 2007–2015 | Slovan Bratislava | 99 | (5) |
| 2010 | → Dubnica (loan) | 11 | (0) |
| 2015–2016 | Podbeskidzie Bielsko-Biała | 34 | (0) |
| 2016 | Ružomberok | 12 | (2) |
| 2017 | Gyirmót | 11 | (0) |
| 2017 | Aktobe | 15 | (0) |
| 2018–2019 | Szombathelyi Haladás | 29 | (0) |
| 2019–2020 | Petržalka | 8 | (0) |
| 2020–2021 | Nitra | 28 | (2) |
| 2021–2022 | SV Stripfing | 13 | (0) |

International career
| 2009 | Slovakia U19 | 2 | (0) |
| 2011–2012 | Slovakia U21 | 13 | (2) |
- * Club domestic league appearances and goals as of 18:45, 25 June 2023 (UTC)

Kristián Kolčák (born 30 January 1990) is a Slovak professional footballer

== Career ==
=== Club ===
On 18 July 2007, Kolčák made his Corgoň Liga debut in the 4–1 home win against Dubnica at the age of 17.

On 15 July 2017, Kolčák signed for Kazakhstan Premier League side Aktobe.
