= Barnabás Rácz =

Hungarian footballer (born 19969

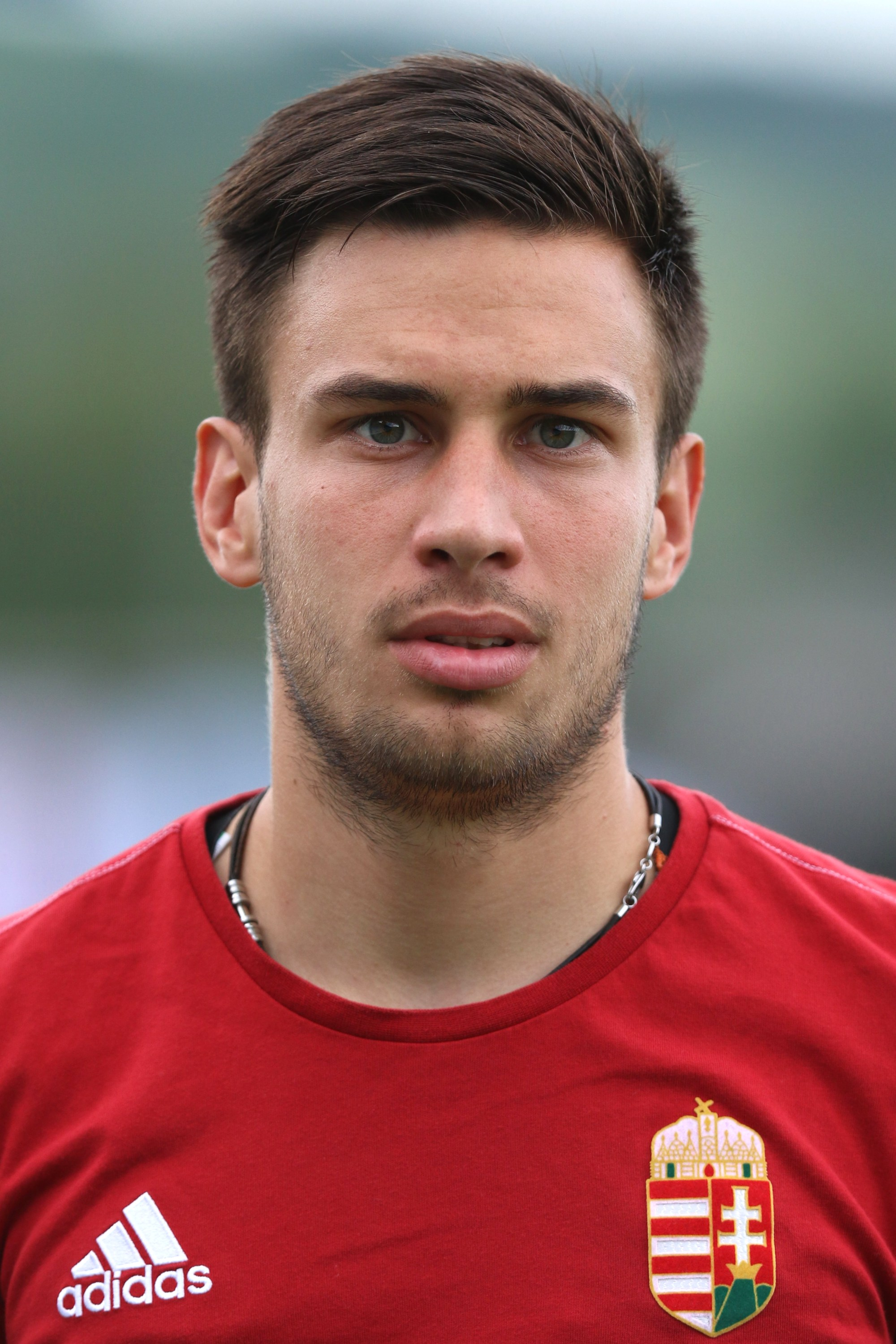

Personal information
- Date of birth: 26 April 1996 (age 30)
- Place of birth: Szombathely, Hungary
- Height: 1.65 m (5 ft 5 in)
- Position: Midfielder

Team information
- Current team: Vasas
- Number: 78

Youth career
- Haladás

Senior career*
Years	Team	Apps	(Gls)
2014–2019	Haladás	81	(3)
2015–2016	→ Sopron (loan)	28	(2)
2019–2021	Újpest	22	(0)
2021	HSC '21	0	(0)
2021–2022	Eindhoven	33	(2)
2022–2024	Haladás	62	(18)
2024–	Vasas	19	(0)

International career
2014	Hungary U19	1	(0)
2017–2018	Hungary U21	5	(1)
- * Club domestic league appearances and goals as of 10 June 2025

Barnabás Rácz (born 26 April 1996) is a Hungarian professional footballer who plays as a midfielder for Nemzeti Bajnokság II club Vasas.

== Club career ==
On 13 August 2021, he signed a one-year contract with Eindhoven in the Netherlands' second-tier Eerste Divisie.

Rácz returned to Hungary on 9 July 2022, joining Nemzeti Bajnokság II club Haladás.

== Career statistics ==
Appearances and goals by club, season and competition
Club	Season	League			Cup		League Cup		Europe		Total	
Club	Season	Division	Apps	Goals	Apps	Goals	Apps	Goals	Apps	Goals	Apps	Goals
Sopron	2015–16	Nemzeti Bajnokság II	28	2	2	0	—		—		30	2
Haladás
Haladás	2014–15	Nemzeti Bajnokság I	4	0	0	0	3	0	—		7	0
Haladás	2016–17	Nemzeti Bajnokság I	33	2	3	0	—		—		36	2
Haladás	2017–18	Nemzeti Bajnokság I	26	1	1	1	—		—		27	2
Haladás	2018–19	Nemzeti Bajnokság I	11	0	3	0	—		—		14	0
Haladás	Total		74	3	7	1	3	0	0	0	84	4
Újpest
Újpest	2018–19	Nemzeti Bajnokság I	13	0	0	0	—		0	0	13	0
Újpest	2019–20	Nemzeti Bajnokság I	9	0	0	0	—		—		9	0
Újpest	Total		22	0	0	0	0	0	0	0	22	0
Career total			124	5	9	1	3	0	0	0	136	6

Updated to games played as of 27 June 2020.
