= András Jancsó =

Hungarian footballer (born 1996)

Personal information
- Date of birth: 22 April 1996 (age 30)
- Place of birth: Szombathely, Hungary
- Height: 1.85 m (6 ft 1 in)
- Position: Defensive midfielder

Team information
- Current team: Haladás
- Number: 70

Youth career
- 2003–2014: Haladás

Senior career*
Years	Team	Apps	(Gls)
2014–2021	Haladás	90	(5)
2015–2016	→ Sopron (loan)	24	(0)
2016	→ Gyirmót (loan)	24	(3)
2021–2023	Szentlőrinc	24	(2)
2023–	Haladás	25	(1)

International career
2014	Hungary U18	1	(0)
2017	Hungary U21	3	(0)
- * Club domestic league appearances and goals as of 26 May 2024

András Jancsó (born 22 April 1996) is a Hungarian football player who plays for Szombathelyi Haladás.

== Career statistics ==
Club	Season	League			Cup		League Cup		Europe		Total	
Club	Season	Division	Apps	Goals	Apps	Goals	Apps	Goals	Apps	Goals	Apps	Goals
Sopron	2015–16	Nemzeti Bajnokság II	24	0	4	0	—		—		28	0
Gyirmót	2016–17	Nemzeti Bajnokság I	24	3	2	1	—		—		26	4
Szombathely
Szombathely	2014–15	Nemzeti Bajnokság I	10	0	0	0	3	0	—		13	0
Szombathely	2016–17	Nemzeti Bajnokság I	1	0	0	0	—		—		1	0
Szombathely	2017–18	Nemzeti Bajnokság I	14	0	0	0	—		—		14	0
Szombathely	2018–19	Nemzeti Bajnokság I	7	0	1	0	—		—		8	0
Szombathely	Total		32	0	1	0	3	0	0	0	36	0
Career total			80	3	7	1	3	0	0	0	90	4

Updated to games played as of 8 December 2018.
