= Máté Tóth (footballer, born 1998) =

Hungarian footballer

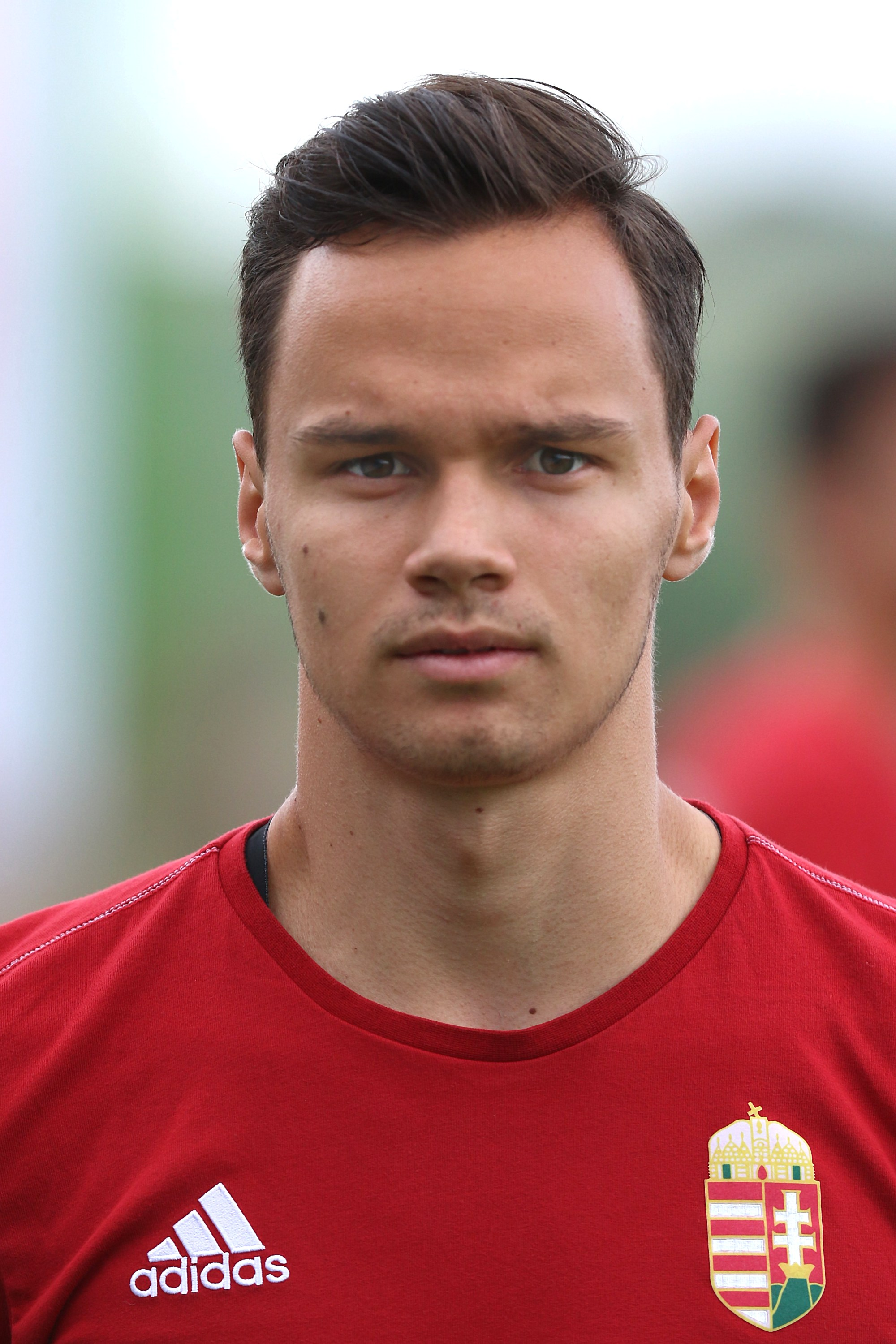

Personal information
- Date of birth: 20 June 1998 (age 28)
- Place of birth: Szombathely, Hungary
- Height: 1.82 m (6 ft 0 in)
- Position: Central midfielder

Team information
- Current team: Békéscsaba
- Number: 6

Youth career
- Haladás

Senior career*
Years	Team	Apps	(Gls)
2016–2018	Haladás	39	(2)
2018–2021	Mezőkövesd	2	(0)
2019–2020	→ Szeged (loan)	6	(0)
2021–2024	Haladás	28	(0)
2024–	Békéscsaba	35	(2)

International career^{‡}
2013	Hungary U-15	1	(0)
2016–2017	Hungary U-19	7	(0)
2017	Hungary U-20	1	(0)
2017	Hungary U-21	3	(0)
- * Club domestic league appearances and goals as of 10 June 2025 ‡ National team caps and goals as of 1 September 2018

Máté Tóth (born 20 June 1998) is a Hungarian football player who plays for Békéscsaba.

== Club career ==
In June 2021, Tóth returned to Haladás on a three-year deal.

== Career statistics ==
Appearances and goals by club, season and competition
Club	Season	League			Cup		Europe		Total	
Club	Season	Division	Apps	Goals	Apps	Goals	Apps	Goals	Apps	Goals
Haladás
Haladás	2016–17	Nemzeti Bajnokság I	23	1	3	2	—		26	3
Haladás	2017–18	Nemzeti Bajnokság I	16	1	0	0	—		16	1
Haladás	Total		39	2	3	2	0	0	42	4
Szeged	2019–20	Nemzeti Bajnokság II	6	0	3	0	—		9	0
Mezőkövesd
Mezőkövesd	2018–19	Nemzeti Bajnokság I	2	0	3	0	—		5	0
Mezőkövesd	2020–21	Nemzeti Bajnokság I	0	0	1	0	—		1	0
Mezőkövesd	Total		2	0	4	0	0	0	6	0
Career total			47	2	10	2	0	0	56	4

Updated to games played as of 15 May 2021.
