= Lóránt Kovács =

Romanian footballer

Personal information
- Date of birth: 6 June 1993 (age 33)
- Place of birth: Târgu Mureș, Romania
- Height: 1.78 m (5 ft 10 in)
- Position: Defensive midfielder

Youth career
- –2009: Ardealul Cluj
- 2009–2012: Universitatea Cluj

Senior career*
Years	Team	Apps	(Gls)
2012–2016	Universitatea Cluj	42	(2)
2012	→ FCM Reșița (loan)	12	(2)
2016–2019	Haladás	65	(6)
2019	Újpest	8	(0)
2020–2022	Sepsi OSK	21	(1)
2021–2022	→ FK Csíkszereda (loan)	21	(10)
2022–2025	FK Csíkszereda	36	(10)
- * Club domestic league appearances and goals as of 10 May 2025

Lóránt Kovács (born 6 June 1993) is a Romanian professional footballer who plays as a midfielder.

== Career ==
Born in Târgu Mureș, Romania, Kovács started playing football in his hometown. Later he moved to Cluj-Napoca at Ardealul Cluj and in 2010 he joined Universitatea Cluj together with other teammates. In 2012, he was loaned to the lower division team CSM Metalul Reșița but at the end of the year, he returned to Universitatea Cluj.

Kovács made his debut in Liga I in May 2013, in a match against FC Rapid București. He joined Haladás in January 2016.

== Club statistics ==
As of match played on 10 May 2025

Appearances and goals by club, season and competition
Club	Season	League			National Cup (Note: Includes Cupa României, Magyar Kupa)		League Cup (Note: Includes Cupa Ligii)		Europe		Other		Total	
Club	Season	Division	Apps	Goals	Apps	Goals	Apps	Goals	Apps	Goals	Apps	Goals	Apps	Goals
Universitatea Cluj	2012–13	Liga I	1	0	—		—		—		—		1	0
Universitatea Cluj	2013–14	Liga I	17	1	0	0	—		—		—		17	1
Universitatea Cluj	2014–15	Liga I	17	1	4	0	2	1	—		—		23	2
Universitatea Cluj	2015–16	Liga II	7	0	2	1	—		—		—		9	1
Universitatea Cluj	Total		42	2	6	1	2	1	—		—		50	4
FCM Reșița (loan)	2012–13	Liga III	12	2	—		—		—		—		12	2
Haladás	2015–16	NB I	12	0	—		—		—		—		12	0
Haladás	2016–17	NB I	27	3	3	0	—		—		—		30	3
Haladás	2017–18	NB I	22	3	1	0	—		—		—		24	3
Haladás	2018–19	NB I	4	0	2	3	—		—		—		6	3
Haladás	Total		65	6	6	3	—		—		—		71	9
Újpest	2018–19	NB I	5	0	—		—		—		—		5	0
Újpest	2019–20	NB I	3	0	0	0	—		—		—		3	0
Újpest	Total		8	0	0	0	—		—		—		8	0
Sepsi OSK	2019–20	Liga I	8	0	2	0	—		—		—		10	0
Sepsi OSK	2020–21	Liga I	13	1	0	0	—		—		—		13	1
Sepsi OSK	Total		21	1	2	0	—		—		—		23	1
FK Csíkszereda (loan)	2021–22	Liga II	21	10	1	0	—		—		—		10	0
FK Csíkszereda	2022–23	Liga II	24	10	1	0	—		—		—		13	1
FK Csíkszereda	2023–24	Liga II	5	0	0	0	—		—		—		5	0
FK Csíkszereda	2024–25	Liga II	7	0	0	0	—		—		—		7	0
FK Csíkszereda	Total		57	20	2	0	—		—		—		59	20
Career Total			205	31	16	4	2	1	—		—		223	36

== Honours ==
Universitatea Cluj

- Cupa României runner-up: 2014–15

Sepsi OSK

- Cupa României runner-up: 2019–20
