= Balázs Petró =

Hungarian footballer

Personal information
- Date of birth: 1 July 1997 (age 29)
- Place of birth: Miskolc, Hungary
- Height: 1.77 m (5 ft 10 in)
- Position: Midfielder

Team information
- Current team: ASKÖ Kobersdorf
- Number: 11

Youth career
- 2002–2010: Diósgyőr
- 2010–2015: Haladás

Senior career*
Years	Team	Apps	(Gls)
2011–2020	Haladás	5	(0)
2016–2017	→ Budaörs (loan)	20	(6)
2019	→ Győri ETO (loan)	6	(0)
2020	Sárvár	2	(0)
2020–2021	Budaörs	17	(2)
2021–2022	Szentlőrinc	1	(0)
2022	Dunaújváros	13	(1)
2023–	ASKÖ Kobersdorf	19	(16)

International career
2013	Hungary U-16	2	(1)
2015	Hungary U-18	2	(0)
2015	Hungary U-19	4	(1)
- * Club domestic league appearances and goals as of 17 October 2023

Balázs Petró (born 1 July 1997) is a Hungarian football player who plays for ASKÖ Kobersdorf.

== Career statistics ==
Appearances and goals by club, season and competition
Club	Season	League			Cup		Europe		Total	
Club	Season	Division	Apps	Goals	Apps	Goals	Apps	Goals	Apps	Goals
Haladás
Haladás	2015–16	Nemzeti Bajnokság I	1	0	1	0	—		2	0
Haladás	2017–18	Nemzeti Bajnokság I	2	0	2	0	—		4	0
Haladás	2018–19	Nemzeti Bajnokság I	1	0	1	0	—		2	0
Haladás	Total		4	0	4	0	0	0	8	0
Budaörs	2016–17	Nemzeti Bajnokság II	20	6	1	0	—		21	6
Career total			24	6	5	0	0	0	29	6

Updated to games played as of 31 October 2018.
