= Karol Mészáros =

Slovak footballer

Personal information
- Full name: Karol Mészáros
- Date of birth: 25 July 1993 (age 33)
- Place of birth: Galanta, Slovakia
- Height: 1.75 m (5 ft 9 in)
- Positions: Forward; winger

Team information
- Current team: Inter Bratislava
- Number: 7

Youth career
- Senec
- Jelka
- 2004–2009: Inter Bratislava
- 2009–2012: Slovan Bratislava

Senior career*
| Years | Team | Apps | (Gls) |
| 2012–2015 | Slovan Bratislava | 87 | (14) |
| 2013 | → ViOn Zlaté Moravce (loan) | 12 | (2) |
| 2016 | Puskás Akadémia | 14 | (3) |
| 2016–2018 | Debrecen | 3 | (0) |
| 2017 | → Szombathelyi Haladás (loan) | 29 | (4) |
| 2018–2019 | Szombathelyi Haladás | 19 | (2) |
| 2019 | Újpest | 3 | (0) |
| 2020–2021 | České Budějovice | 36 | (2) |
| 2021–2023 | Slovan Liberec | 30 | (1) |
| 2024 | ViOn Zlaté Moravce | 5 | (0) |
| 2024-2026 | Inter Bratislava | 44 | (8) |

International career
| 2012–2014 | Slovakia U21 | 3 | (0) |
- * Club domestic league appearances and goals as of 25 May 2026

Karol Mészáros (Hungarian: Mészáros Karol; born 25 July 1993) is a Slovak football player who plays for Inter Bratislava.

== Career ==
Mészáros started his career with Senec, later FC Jelka and at the age of fourteen years he moved to Bratislava-based Inter. He won the Slovak U15 league Inter. He then transferred to the rivalling Slovan Bratislava. He made his debut in a pre-season friendly against PŠC Pezinok, replacing Juraj Halenár. The league season began well for Mészáros, as he made a debut with a splendid assist for Ondřej Smetana, netting the opener in a 3–1 home win against Dunajská Streda. On 11 March 2012 he scored his first goal for Slovan against Košice in a 1–0 win. In January 2013, Mészáros was sent to ViOn Zlaté Moravce on a half-year loan to achieve greater playing time.
