= Soproni VSE =

Hungarian football club

- Full name: Soproni Vasutas Sportegylet
- Founded: 1921
- Ground: Soproni Vasutas Sporttelep
- League: MB I
- 2022–23: MB II, Győr-Moson-Sopron, 1st of 13
- Website: http://www.svse.hu/
Home colours	Away colours

Soproni VSE is a Hungarian football club based in Sopron, Győr-Moson-Sopron, Hungary, that competes in the Megyei Bajnokság I, the fourth tier of Hungarian football. The club's colours are purple and white. They won the Nemzeti Bajnokság II two times in 1945 and 1946, but they have never played in the first league. In 2011, the club won the championship in the third league, so in the 2011–12 season they were promoted to the Nemzeti Bajnokság II. It is a successor of FC Sopron.

== Current squad ==
Note: Flags indicate national team as defined under FIFA eligibility rules; some limited exceptions apply. Players may hold more than one non-FIFA nationality.

No.	Pos.	Nation	Player
18	DF	HUN	Norbert Baranyai
29	DF	HUN	László Szabó
—	GK	HUN	Csongor Csaba Simon
—	GK	HUN	Olivér Tóth
—	FW	HUN	Ármin Kocsis
—	DF	HUN	Adrian Bence Tóth
—	MF	HUN	Mátyás Krizsonits
—	FW	HUN	Máté Hornyák
—	MF	HUN	Ábel Ábrahám
—	MF	HUN	Patrik Purt
—	MF	HUN	Richárd Márk Gere
—	MF	HUN	Dominik Kalmár
—		HUN	Dominik Erdősi
—		HUN	Bence Harangozó
—		HUN	Daniel Szőke
—		HUN	Krisztián Kitl

No.	Pos.	Nation	Player
—		HUN	Dominik Kovács
—	GK	HUN	Zsolt Ratkái
—	FW	HUN	Benjámin Pető
—	GK	HUN	Péter Majer
—	FW	HUN	Noel Kustor
—	DF	HUN	Krisztián Keresztes
—	DF	HUN	Gábor Jakab
—		HUN	Dávid Jakab
—	DF	HUN	Patrik Holzmann
—	MF	HUN	Bence Harence
—		HUN	Gergő Gáncs
—	FW	HUN	Dániel Galambos
—	MF	HUN	István Bódis
—	FW	HUN	Alex Kovács
—	MF	HUN	Tibor Sifter

== Honours ==
- Nemzeti Bajnokság II:
  - Winners (1): 1945

== Seasons ==
The table below shows the seasons of Soproni VSE.

Season	Tier	Club's name	Position	Pts
1923–24	3	Soproni Vasutas SE	7 / 8	-
1924–25	3	Soproni Vasutas SE	1 / 8	21
1925–26	2	Soproni Vasutas SE	7 / 10	16
1926–27	2	Soproni Vasutas SE	4 / 10	21
1927–28	2	Soproni Vasutas SE	6 / 10	17
1928–29	2	Soproni VSE	4 / 10	20
1929–30	2	Soproni VSE	4 / 11	28
1930–31	2	Soproni Vasutas SE	7 / 11	19
1931–32	2	Soproni VSE	3 / 11	22
1932–33	2	Soproni VSE	4 / 12	25
1933–34	2	Soproni Vasutas SE	1 / 12	30
1934–35	2	Soproni Vasutas SE	1 / 12	32
1935–36	2	Soproni VSE	4 / 14	32
1936–37	2	Soproni VSE	2 / 13	36
1937–38	2	Soproni VSE	4 / 14	33
1938–39	3	Soproni VSE	1 / 14	39
1939–40	2	Soproni VSE	5 / 14	29
1940–41	2	Soproni VSE	9 / 14	25
1941–42	2	Soproni VSE	3 / 14	37
1942–43	2	Soproni VSE	5 / 12	22
1943–44	2	Soproni VSE	6 / 16	36
1944–45	2	Soproni VSE	4 / 14	11
1944–45	2	Soproni Vasutas SE	0 / 11	
1945	2	Soproni VSE	1 / 7	13
1945–46	2	Soproni Vasutas SE	1 / 14	47
1946–47	2	Soproni VSE	7 / 14	28
1947–48	2	Soproni Vasutas SE	5 / 14	31
1948–49	2	Soproni Vasutas SE	6 / 16	34
1949–50	2	Soproni Lokomotív	11 / 16	24
1950	2	Soproni Lokomotív	8 / 16	14
1951	2	Soproni Lokomotív	9 / 14	23
1952	2	Soproni Lokomotív	17 / 18	19
1953	3	Soproni Lokomotív	1 / 12	34
1954	2	Soproni Lokomotív	8 / 16	30
1955	2	Soproni Törekvés	11 / 16	27
1956	2	Soproni VSE	16 / 16	13
1957–58	2	Soproni VSE	13 / 19	30
1958–59	3	Soproni VSE	3 / 16	39
1959–60	3	Soproni Vasutas SE	2 / 17	40
1960–61	3	Soproni VSE	1 / 16	43
1961–62	2	Soproni VSE	14 / 16	21
1962–63	3	Soproni VSE	10 / 16	26
1963	4	Soproni VSE	7 / 16	17
1964	4	Soproni VSE	6 / 17	29
1965	4	Soproni VSE	2 / 16	42
1966	4	Soproni VSE	4 / 16	38
1967	4	Soproni VSE	4 / 16	32
1968	4	Soproni VSE	10 / 16	29
1969	4	Soproni VSE	5 / 16	33
1970	4	Soproni VSE	8 / 16	16
1970–71	4	Soproni VSE	6 / 16	29
1971–72	4	Soproni VSE	2 / 16	42
1972–73	4	Soproni VSE	2 / 16	39
1973–74	4	Soproni VSE	1 / 16	43
1974–75	3	Soproni VSE	9 / 20	36
1975–76	3	Soproni Közlekedési SE	13 / 19	34
1976–77	3	Soproni Közlekedési SE	6 / 20	44
1977–78	3	Soproni KSE	19 / 20	21
1978–79	5	Soproni VSE	1 / 9	26
1979–80	4	Soproni Vasutas SE	1 / 15	48
1980–81	3	Soproni VSE	17 / 18	19
1981–82	4	Soproni VSE	3 / 16	41
1982–83	4	Soproni VSE	4 / 16	38
1983–84	4	Soproni VSE	6 / 16	36
1984–85	4	Sporoni VSE	8 / 16	35
1985–86	4	Soproni VSE	12 / 16	24
1986–87	4	Soproni VSE	3 / 16	37
1987–88	4	Soproni VSE	3 / 16	38
1988–89	4	Soproni VSE	5 / 16	38
1989–90	4	Soproni VSE	4 / 16	47
1990–91	4	Soproni Vasutas SE	4 / 16	38
1991–92	4	Soproni VSE	11 / 16	27
1992–93	4	Soproni VSE	5 / 16	34
1993–94	4	Soproni VSE	2 / 16	42
1994–95	4	Soproni Vasutas SE	4 / 16	61
1995–96	4	Soproni Vasutas SE	1 / 16	70
1996–97	3	Soproni VSE	9 / 16	37
1997–98	4	Soproni VSE	9 / 16	39
1998–99	4	Soproni VSE-GYSEV	12 / 16	35
1999–00	4	Soproni VSE	4 / 16	45
2000	3	Soproni VSE-GYSEV	4 / 8	19
2000–01	4	Soproni VSE-GYSEV	8 / 11	24
2001–02	4	Soproni VSE-GYSEV	13 / 14	18
2002–03	4	Soproni VSE-GYSEV	14 / 16	26
2003–04	4	Soproni VSE	13 / 16	25
2004–05	4	Soproni VSE	10 / 14	29
2005–06	3	Soproni VSE-GYSEV	11 / 16	37
2006–07	3	Soproni VSE	4 / 14	49
2007–08	3	Soproni VSE-GYSEV	8 / 18	52
2008–09	3	Soproni VSE	9 / 16	39
2009–10	3	Soproni VSE-GYSEV	3 / 14	47
2010–11	3	Soproni Vasutas SE	1 / 16	71
2011–12	2	Soproni VSE-GYSEV-Goldschmidt	14 / 16	30
2012–13	2	Soproni VSE-GYSEV Goldschmidt	8 / 16	46
2013–14	2	Soproni VSE-GYSEV	10 / 16	38
2014–15	2	Soproni VSE-GYSEV	5 / 16	48
2015–16	2	Swietelsky-Soproni Vasutas SE	12 / 16	33
2016–17	2	Swietelsky-Soproni VSE	13 / 20	49
2017–18	2	Swietelsky-Soproni VSE	20 / 20	20
2018–19	6	Soproni VSE-GYSEV	1 / 15	70
2019–20	5	Soproni VSE-GYSEV	8 / 14	20
2020–21	5	Soproni VSE-GYSEV	2 / 14	51
2021–22	5	Soproni VSE-GYSEV	4 / 15	46
2022–23	5	Soproni VSE-GYSEV	1 / 13	52
2023–24	5	Soproni VSE-GYSEV	7 / 13	38
2024–25	5	Soproni VSE-GYSEV	10 / 10	14
2025–26	5	Soproni VSE-GYSEV	12 / 12	12
