= 2018–19 Puskás Akadémia FC season =

Puskás Akadémia
2018–19 season
- Chairman: Felcsúti Utánpótlás Neveléséért Alapítvány
- Manager: Miklós Benczés (until 28 December 2018); János Radoki (until 7 April 2019); András Komjáti
- Nemzeti Bajnokság I: 7th
- Magyar Kupa: Quarter-finals
- Top goalscorer: League: Josip Knežević (12); All: Josip Knežević (12)
- Highest home attendance: 3,865 vs Ferencváros (19 May 2019)
- Lowest home attendance: 300 vs Soroksár (13 March 2019)
Home colours	Away colours	Third colours

The 2018–19 season was Puskás Akadémia Football Club's 5th competitive season, 2nd consecutive season in the Nemzeti Bajnokság I and 7th year in existence as a football club.In addition to the domestic league, Puskás Akadémia participated in this season's editions of the Magyar Kupa.

== First team squad ==
Note: Flags indicate national team as defined under FIFA eligibility rules; some limited exceptions apply. Players may hold more than one non-FIFA nationality.

No.	Pos.	Nation	Player
3	DF	SVK	Richard Križan
4	MF	HUN	Szilárd Bokros
5	MF	CRO	Benedik Mioč
6	DF	SVN	Dejan Trajkovski
7	FW	GEO	Bachana Arabuli
8	MF	SVK	Jozef Urblík
9	FW	HUN	Bence Sós
10	MF	HUN	András Radó
11	MF	SVK	Jan Vlasko
12	MF	HUN	Balázs Balogh
14	DF	BEL	Jonathan Heris
16	MF	URU	Gonzalo Vega
19	GK	HUN	Lajos Hegedűs
21	MF	HUN	Tamás Kiss

No.	Pos.	Nation	Player
22	DF	HUN	Roland Szolnoki
23	DF	HUN	Csaba Spandler
24	DF	HUN	Patrik Poór
25	MF	HUN	Zsolt Nagy
26	DF	BUL	Kamen Hadzhiev
27	MF	ALB	Liridon Latifi
29	FW	HUN	Nándor Tamás
30	MF	CRO	Josip Knežević
33	MF	HUN	József Varga
44	GK	SRB	Branislav Danilović
55	MF	HUN	Péter Szakály
68	DF	HUN	János Hegedűs
71	DF	HUN	Attila Osváth
77	FW	PAN	Tony Taylor

== Transfers ==
=== Summer ===
In: Note: Flags indicate national team as defined under FIFA eligibility rules; some limited exceptions apply. Players may hold more than one non-FIFA nationality.

No.	Pos.	Nation	Player
5	MF	CRO	Benedik Mioc (loan from (Croatia) Osijek)
7	FW	GEO	Bachana Arabuli (from Balmazújváros)
9	FW	ECU	Bryan de Jesús (loan from (Ecuador) El Nacional)
11	MF	SVK	Jan Vlasko (from (Slovakia) Spartak Trnava)
21	FW	HUN	Tamás Kiss (from Szombathely)
22	DF	HUN	Roland Szolnoki (from MOL Vidi)
25	MF	SVK	Jozef Urblik (from (Czech Republic) Vysočina Jihlava)
33	MF	HUN	József Varga (from MOL Vidi)
45	FW	NGA	Ezekiel Henty (from MOL Vidi)

Out: Note: Flags indicate national team as defined under FIFA eligibility rules; some limited exceptions apply. Players may hold more than one non-FIFA nationality.

No.	Pos.	Nation	Player
4	DF	HUN	Zsolt Tar (to Győr)
7	FW	HUN	Márk Szécsi (loan to Debrecen)
8	MF	HUN	Dávid Márkvárt (to Diósgyőr)
11	MF	HUN	Dániel Prosser (loan to (Romania) Sepsi)
13	DF	HUN	Ádám Csilus (loan to Csákvár)
15	MF	CMR	Patrick Mevoungou (to Mezőkövesd)
21	DF	SVN	Denis Klinar (to (Slovenia) Maribor)
28	MF	CRO	Stipe Bačelić-Grgić (to (Croatia) Slaven Belupo)
33	FW	HUN	Gábor Molnár (loan to Mezőkövesd)
45	FW	NGA	Ezekiel Henty (loan to (Croatia) Osijek)
77	FW	CRO	Antonio Perošević (loan to (United Arab Emirates) Al-Ittihad)
80	MF	HUN	Márk Madarász (loan to Zalaegerszeg)

=== Winter ===
In: Note: Flags indicate national team as defined under FIFA eligibility rules; some limited exceptions apply. Players may hold more than one non-FIFA nationality.

No.	Pos.	Nation	Player
3	DF	SVK	Richard Križan (from (Slovakia) Nitra)
9	FW	HUN	Bence Sós (loan from Fehérvár)
11	FW	HUN	Dániel Prosser (loan return from (Romania) Sepsi)
26	DF	BUL	Kamen Hadzhiev (from (Bulgaria) Beroe)
29	FW	HUN	Nándor Tamás (loan return from Csákvár)
77	FW	PAN	Tony Taylor (from (United States) Ottawa)
80	MF	HUN	Márk Madarász (loan return from Zalaegerszeg)

Out: Note: Flags indicate national team as defined under FIFA eligibility rules; some limited exceptions apply. Players may hold more than one non-FIFA nationality.

No.	Pos.	Nation	Player
9	FW	ECU	Bryan de Jesús (loan return to (Ecuador) El Nacional)
11	FW	HUN	Dániel Prosser (loan to Diósgyőr)
17	MF	HUN	László Zsidai (to Paks)
80	MF	HUN	Márk Madarász (loan to Győr)

== Statistics ==
=== Appearances and goals ===
Last updated on 19 May 2019.

No.	Pos	Nat	Player	Total		Nemzeti Bajnokság I		Magyar Kupa	
No.	Pos	Nat	Player	Apps	Goals	Apps	Goals	Apps	Goals
3	DF	(Slovakia) SVK	Richard Križan	1	0	1	0	0	0
4	MF	(Hungary) HUN	Szilárd Bokros	12	0	9	0	3	0
5	MF	(Croatia) CRO	Benedik Mioč	29	1	22	0	7	1
6	DF	(Slovenia) SVN	Dejan Trajkovski	15	0	13	0	2	0
7	FW	(Georgia (country)) GEO	Bachana Arabuli	24	6	22	5	2	1
8	MF	(Slovakia) SVK	Jozef Urblík	24	1	19	1	5	0
9	FW	(Hungary) HUN	Bence Sós	14	0	11	0	3	0
10	MF	(Hungary) HUN	András Radó	33	7	28	3	5	4
11	MF	(Slovakia) SVK	Jan Vlasko	5	1	4	0	1	1
12	MF	(Hungary) HUN	Balázs Balogh	19	0	15	0	4	0
14	DF	(Belgium) BEL	Jonathan Heris	26	0	21	0	5	0
16	MF	(Uruguay) URU	Gonzalo Vega	15	2	10	0	5	2
19	GK	(Hungary) HUN	Lajos Hegedűs	22	-28	18	-26	4	-2
21	MF	(Hungary) HUN	Tamás Kiss	35	3	30	3	5	0
22	DF	(Hungary) HUN	Roland Szolnoki	23	0	20	0	3	0
23	DF	(Hungary) HUN	Csaba Spandler	14	0	12	0	2	0
24	DF	(Hungary) HUN	Patrik Poór	25	0	21	0	4	0
25	MF	(Hungary) HUN	Zsolt Nagy	16	3	14	3	2	0
26	DF	(Bulgaria) BUL	Kamen Hadzhiev	17	0	15	0	2	0
27	MF	(Albania) ALB	Liridon Latifi	21	6	17	1	4	5
29	FW	(Hungary) HUN	Nándor Tamás	10	1	8	1	2	0
30	MF	(Croatia) CRO	Josip Knežević	27	12	24	12	3	0
33	MF	(Hungary) HUN	József Varga	18	1	17	1	1	0
44	GK	(Serbia) SRB	Branislav Danilović	18	-23	15	-19	3	-4
55	MF	(Hungary) HUN	Péter Szakály	21	0	16	0	5	0
68	DF	(Hungary) HUN	János Hegedűs	25	3	22	2	3	1
71	DF	(Hungary) HUN	Attila Osváth	19	1	14	0	5	1
77	FW	(Panama) PAN	Tony Taylor	1	0	0	0	1	0
Youth players:
17	MF	(Hungary) HUN	György Komáromi	1	0	0	0	1	0
99	GK	(Hungary) HUN	Ádám Varga	1	0	0	0	1	0
Out to loan:
33	FW	(Hungary) HUN	Gábor Molnár	4	1	4	1	0	0
Players no longer at the club:
8	MF	(Hungary) HUN	Dávid Márkvárt	4	0	4	0	0	0
9	FW	(Mali) MLI	Ulysse Diallo	5	1	5	1	0	0
9	FW	(Ecuador) ECU	Bryan de Jesús	4	1	3	1	1	0
17	MF	(Hungary) HUN	László Zsidai	7	1	5	0	2	1

=== Top scorers ===
Includes all competitive matches. The list is sorted by shirt number when total goals are equal.

Last updated on 19 May 2019

Position	Nation	Number	Name	Nemzeti Bajnokság I	Magyar Kupa	Total
1	(Croatia)	30	Josip Knežević	12	0	12
2	(Hungary)	10	András Radó	3	4	7
3	(Georgia (country))	7	Bachana Arabuli	5	1	6
4	(Albania)	27	Liridon Latifi	1	5	6
5	(Hungary)	21	Tamás Kiss	3	0	3
6	(Hungary)	25	Zsolt Nagy	3	0	3
7	(Hungary)	68	János Hegedűs	2	1	3
8	(Uruguay)	16	Gonzalo Vega	0	2	2
9	(Mali)	9	Ulysse Diallo	1	0	1
10	(Hungary)	33	Gábor Molnár	1	0	1
11	(Ecuador)	9	Bryan de Jesús	1	0	1
12	(Czech Republic)	8	Jozef Urblík	1	0	1
13	(Hungary)	33	József Varga	1	0	1
14	(Hungary)	29	Nándor Tamás	1	0	1
15	(Croatia)	5	Benedik Mioč	0	1	1
16	(Slovakia)	11	Jan Vlasko	0	1	1
17	(Hungary)	71	Attila Osváth	0	1	1
18	(Hungary)	17	László Zsidai	0	1	1
/	/	/	Own Goals	1	0	1
			TOTALS	36	17	53

=== Disciplinary record ===
Includes all competitive matches. Players with 1 card or more included only.

Last updated on 19 May 2019

Position	Nation	Number	Name	Nemzeti Bajnokság I		Magyar Kupa		Total (Hu Total)	
Position	Nation	Number	Name	Booked	Sent off (straight red)	Booked	Sent off (straight red)	Booked	Sent off (straight red)
MF	(Hungary)	4	Szilárd Bokros	2	0	1	0	3 (2)	0 (0)
MF	(Slovenia)	5	Benedik Mioč	2	0	0	0	2 (2)	0 (0)
DF	(Slovenia)	6	Dejan Trajkovski	4	0	0	0	4 (4)	0 (0)
FW	(Georgia (country))	7	Bachana Arabuli	3	0	0	0	3 (3)	0 (0)
MF	(Slovakia)	8	Jozef Urblík	1	0	0	0	1 (1)	0 (0)
FW	(Hungary)	9	Bence Sós	2	1	1	0	3 (2)	1 (1)
FW	(Mali)	9	Ulysse Diallo	3	0	0	0	3 (3)	0 (0)
DF	(Belgium)	14	Jonathan Heris	3	1	1	0	4 (3)	1 (1)
MF	(Uruguay)	16	Gonzalo Vega	2	0	1	0	3 (2)	0 (0)
MF	(Hungary)	17	György Komáromi	0	0	1	0	3 (2)	0 (0)
MF	(Hungary)	17	László Zsidai	4	0	0	0	4 (4)	0 (0)
MF	(Hungary)	21	Tamás Kiss	3	0	1	0	4 (3)	0 (0)
DF	(Hungary)	22	Roland Szolnoki	8	1	1	0	9 (8)	1 (1)
DF	(Hungary)	23	Csaba Spandler	3	1	2	0	5 (3)	1 (1)
DF	(Hungary)	24	Patrik Poór	5	0	0	0	5 (5)	0 (0)
MF	(Hungary)	25	Zsolt Nagy	4	0	2	0	6 (4)	0 (0)
DF	(Bulgaria)	26	Kamen Hadzhiev	1	0	1	0	2 (1)	0 (0)
MF	(Albania)	27	Liridon Latifi	2	1	0	0	2 (2)	1 (1)
FW	(Hungary)	29	Nándor Tamás	2	0	0	0	2 (2)	0 (0)
MF	(Croatia)	30	Josip Knežević	5	0	0	0	5 (5)	0 (0)
MF	(Hungary)	33	József Varga	6	0	0	0	6 (6)	0 (0)
FW	(Hungary)	33	Gábor Molnár	0	1	0	0	0 (0)	1 (1)
GK	(Serbia)	44	Branislav Danilović	2	0	0	0	2 (2)	0 (0)
MF	(Hungary)	55	Péter Szakály	2	0	0	0	2 (2)	0 (0)
DF	(Hungary)	68	János Hegedűs	5	0	1	0	6 (5)	0 (0)
DF	(Hungary)	71	Attila Osváth	3	0	1	0	4 (3)	0 (0)
			TOTALS	77	6	14	0	91 (77)	6 (6)

=== Overall ===
Games played	40 (33 Nemzeti Bajnokság I and 7 Magyar Kupa)
Games won	15 (11 Nemzeti Bajnokság I and 4 Magyar Kupa)
Games drawn	9 (7 Nemzeti Bajnokság I and 2 Magyar Kupa)
Games lost	16 (15 Nemzeti Bajnokság I and 1 Magyar Kupa)
Goals scored	53
Goals conceded	51
Goal difference	+2
Yellow cards	91
Red cards	6
Worst discipline	(Hungary) Roland Szolnoki (9 (yellow card) , 1 (red card) )
Best result	6–0 (A) v Pénzügyőr - Magyar Kupa - 4–12–2018
Worst result	0–4 (A) v Ferencváros - Nemzeti Bajnokság I - 23–2–2019
Worst result	0–4 (H) v Kisvárda - Nemzeti Bajnokság I - 6–4–2019
Most appearances	(Hungary) Tamás Kiss (35 appearances)
Top scorer	(Croatia) Josip Knežević (12 goals)
Points	54/120 (45.0%)

Last updated: 19 May 2019

== Nemzeti Bajnokság I ==
=== Matches ===
21 July 2018 1	Puskás Akadémia	0 – 1	Debrecen	Felcsút, Fejér County
17:00 CEST		Report	Calvente 78'	Stadium: Pancho Arena; Attendance: 931; Referee: (Hungary) István Vad

28 July 2018 2	Diósgyőr	2 – 2	Puskás Akadémia	Miskolc, Borsod-Abaúj-Zemplén County
17:00 CEST	Brković 32'; Vernes 52'	Report	Diallo 13'; Radó 19' (pen.)	Stadium: Diósgyőri Stadion; Attendance: 4,349; Referee: (Hungary) Ferenc Karakó

4 August 2018 3	Puskás Akadémia	1 – 2	MTK Budapest	Felcsút, Fejér County
17:00 CEST	Kiss 56'	Report	Ramos 33'; Torghelle 86'	Stadium: Pancho Arena; Attendance: 837; Referee: (Hungary) Ádám Farkas

11 August 2018 4	Szombathelyi Haladás	2 – 1	Puskás Akadémia	Szombathely, Vas County
19:30 CEST	Mészáros 69' (pen.), 87' (pen.)	(Report)	Molnár 90+3'	Stadium: Haladás Sportkomplexum; Attendance: 3,936; Referee: (Hungary) Péter Solymosi

18 August 2018 5	Puskás Akadémia	1 – 1	Kisvárda	Felcsút, Fejér County
19:30 CEST	Knežević 58'	Report	Lucas 77'	Stadium: Pancho Arena; Attendance: 589; Referee: (Hungary) Viktor Kassai

25 August 2018 6	Paks	3 – 2	Puskás Akadémia	Paks, Tolna County
19:30 CEST	Hahn 13', 90+3'; Hegedűs 68' (o.g.)	Report	Arabuli 76'; Latifi 81'	Stadium: Fehérvári úti Stadion; Attendance: 600; Referee: (Hungary) Ádám Farkas

1 September 2018 7	Mezőkövesd	2 – 0	Puskás Akadémia	Mezőkövesd, Borsod-Abaúj-Zemplén County
19:30 CEST	Dražić 17'; Pillár 78'	Report		Stadium: Mezőkövesdi Városi Stadion; Attendance: 2,155; Referee: (Hungary) Gergő Bogár

15 September 2018 8	Puskás Akadémia	2 – 1	MOL Vidi	Felcsút, Fejér County
17:00 CEST	Knežević 39'; Jesús 85'	Report	Šćepović 24'	Stadium: Pancho Arena; Attendance: 1,728; Referee: (Hungary) Gergely Szőts

29 September 2018 9	Puskás Akadémia	1 – 0	Budapest Honvéd	Felcsút, Fejér County
17:00 CEST	Knežević 17'	Report		Stadium: Pancho Arena; Attendance: 1,200; Referee: (Hungary) Balázs Berke

6 October 2018 10	Újpest	2 – 0	Puskás Akadémia	Budapest, Pest County
17:00 CEST	Nwobodo 52'; Novothny 73'	Report		Stadium: Szusza Ferenc Stadion; Attendance: 1,799; Referee: (Hungary) József Erdős

20 October 2018 11	Puskás Akadémia	1 – 0	Ferencváros	Felcsút, Fejér County
19:30 CEST	Hegedűs 20'	Report		Stadium: Pancho Arena; Attendance: 3,838; Referee: (Hungary) Péter Solymosi

27 October 2018 12	Debrecen	2 – 1	Puskás Akadémia	Debrecen, Hajdú-Bihar County
17:00 CEST	Könyves 32'; Avdijaj 71'	Report	Kiss 51'	Stadium: Nagyerdei Stadion; Attendance: 2,814; Referee: (Hungary) Ádám Farkas

3 November 2018 13	Puskás Akadémia	2 – 1	Diósgyőr	Felcsút, Fejér County
17:00 CET	Arabuli 79'; Hegedűs 88'	Report	Tajti 81'	Stadium: Pancho Arena; Attendance: 916; Referee: (Hungary) Csaba Pintér

10 November 2018 14	MTK Budapest	3 – 2	Puskás Akadémia	Budapest, Pest County
17:00 CET	Lencse 26'; Baki 65'; Torghelle 81'	Report	Arabuli 38'; Knežević 76'	Stadium: Hidegkuti Nándor Stadion; Attendance: 1,849; Referee: (Hungary) Balázs Berke

24 November 2018 15	Puskás Akadémia	2 – 0	Szombathelyi Haladás	Felcsút, Fejér County
17:00 CET	Kiss 12'; Knežević 17'	(Report)		Stadium: Pancho Aréna; Attendance: 700; Referee: (Hungary) Gergely Szőts

1 December 2018 16	Kisvárda	1 – 0	Puskás Akadémia	Kisvárda, Szabolcs-Szatmár-Bereg County
17:00 CET	Horváth 35'	Report		Stadium: Várkert Sportpálya; Attendance: 1,090; Referee: (Hungary) Zoltán Iványi

8 December 2018 17	Puskás Akadémia	1 – 1	Paks	Felcsút, Fejér County
17:00 CET	Arabuli 90+4'	Report	Remili 32'	Stadium: Pancho Arena; Attendance: 527; Referee: (Hungary) Bognár

15 December 2018 18	Puskás Akadémia	2 – 0	Mezőkövesd	Felcsút, Fejér County
17:00 CET	Knežević 60', 69' (pen.)	Report		Stadium: Pancho Arena; Attendance: 418; Referee: (Hungary) Csaba Pintér

2 February 2019 19	MOL Vidi	0 – 3	Puskás Akadémia	Székesfehérvár, Fejér County
17:00 CET		Report	Urblík 7'; Radó 72'; Arabuli 88'	Stadium: MOL Aréna Sóstó; Attendance: 2,980; Referee: (Hungary) Viktor Kassai

9 February 2019 20	Budapest Honvéd	2 – 1	Puskás Akadémia	Budapest, Pest County
17:00 CET	Holender 9', 17'	Report	Radó 73'	Stadium: Hidegkuti Nándor Stadion; Attendance: 1,780; Referee: (Hungary) István Vad

16 February 2019 21	Puskás Akadémia	0 – 1	Újpest	Felcsút, Fejér County
17:00 CET		Report	Bokros 51' (o.g.)	Stadium: Pancho Arena; Attendance: 1,412; Referee: (Hungary) Tamás Bognár

23 February 2019 22	Ferencváros	4 – 0	Puskás Akadémia	Budapest, Pest County
17:00 CET	Gorriarán 47' (pen.); Petryak 49'; Nguen 58'; Signevich 90+2'	Report		Stadium: Groupama Arena; Attendance: 6,771; Referee: (Hungary) Ádám Farkas

2 March 2019 23	Puskás Akadémia	2 – 0	Debrecen	Felcsút, Fejér County
17:00 CET	Knežević 47' (pen.), 82'	Report		Stadium: Pancho Arena; Attendance: 1,028; Referee: (Hungary) Viktor Kassai

9 March 2019 24	Diósgyőr	1 – 0	Puskás Akadémia	Miskolc, Borsod-Abaúj-Zemplén County
17:00 CET	Hasani 63'	Report		Stadium: DVTK Stadion; Attendance: 3,837; Referee: (Hungary) Ferenc Karakó

16 March 2019 25	Puskás Akadémia	3 – 2	MTK Budapest	Felcsút, Fejér County
17:00 CET	Varga 4'; Nagy 48'; Tamás 90+1'	Report	Selin 28'; Torghelle 35'	Stadium: Pancho Arena; Attendance: 1,121; Referee: (Hungary) István Vad

30 March 2019 26	Szombathelyi Haladás	3 – 0	Puskás Akadémia	Szombathely, Vas County
17:00 CET	Rabušic 31'; Rui Pedro 45', 58'	Report		Stadium: Haladás Sportkomplexum; Attendance: 2,745; Referee: (Hungary) Balázs Berke

6 April 2019 27	Puskás Akadémia	0 – 4	Kisvárda	Felcsút, Fejér County
17:00 CEST		Report	Gosztonyi 19'; Grozav 31'; Melnyk 55'; Horváth 71' (pen.)	Stadium: Pancho Arena; Attendance: 700; Referee: (Hungary) Sándor Andó-Szabó

13 April 2019 28	Paks	0 – 0	Puskás Akadémia	Paks, Tolna County
17:00 CEST		Report		Stadium: Fehérvári úti Stadion; Attendance: 850; Referee: (Hungary) Viktor Kassai

20 April 2019 29	Puskás Akadémia	1 – 0	Mezőkövesd	Felcsút, Fejér County
17:00 CEST	Knežević 72'	Report		Stadium: Pancho Arena; Attendance: 1,038; Referee: (Hungary) István Vad

27 April 2019 30	MOL Vidi	1 – 1	Puskás Akadémia	Székesfehérvár, Fejér County
17:00 CEST	Milanov 54' (pen.)	Report	Juhász 84' (o.g.)	Stadium: MOL Aréna Sóstó; Attendance: 2,585; Referee: (Hungary) Viktor Kassai

4 May 2019 31	Puskás Akadémia	2 – 2	Budapest Honvéd	Felcsút, Fejér County
17:00 CEST	Nagy 9'; Knežević 39' (pen.)	Report	Holender 40'; Lovrić 59'	Stadium: Pancho Arena; Attendance: 1,941; Referee: (Hungary) Péter Solymosi

11 May 2019 32	Újpest	0 – 1	Puskás Akadémia	Budapest, Pest County
17:00 CEST		Report	Knežević 59'	Stadium: Szusza Ferenc Stadion; Attendance: 2,717; Referee: (Hungary) Zoltán Iványi

19 May 2019 33	Puskás Akadémia	1 – 1	Ferencváros	Felcsút, Fejér County
17:00 CEST	Nagy 52'	Report	Lanzafame 60'	Stadium: Pancho Arena; Attendance: 3,865; Referee: (Hungary) Csaba Pintér

=== League table ===
Pos	Team	Pld	W	D	L	GF	GA	GD	Pts
5	Újpest	33	12	12	9	38	28	+10	48
6	Mezőkövesd	33	12	8	13	45	40	+5	44
7	Puskás Akadémia	33	11	7	15	36	45	−9	40
8	Paks	33	9	12	12	33	46	−13	39
9	Kisvárda	33	10	8	15	36	48	−12	38

Source: Hungarian Football Federation (in Hungarian), Soccerway
Rules for classification: 1) Points; 2) Matches won; 3) Goal difference; 4) Goals scored; 5) Head-to-head points; 6) Head-to-head goal difference; 7) Head-to-head away goals scored; 8) Fair play ranking; 9) Drawing of lots.

=== Results summary ===
Overall								Home						Away					
Pld	W	D	L	GF	GA	GD	Pts	W	D	L	GF	GA	GD	W	D	L	GF	GA	GD
33	11	7	15	36	45	−9	40	9	4	4	22	17	+5	2	3	11	14	28	−14

Last updated: 19 May 2019.
Source: NB1

=== Results by round ===
Round	1	2	3	4	5	6	7	8	9	10	11	12	13	14	15	16	17	18	19	20	21	22	23	24	25	26	27	28	29	30	31	32	33
Ground	H	A	H	A	H	A	A	H	H	A	H	A	H	A	H	A	H	H	A	A	H	A	H	A	H	A	H	A	H	A	H	A	H
Result	L	D	L	L	D	L	L	W	W	L	W	L	W	L	W	L	D	W	W	L	L	L	W	L	W	L	L	D	W	D	D	W	D
Position	8	8	8	10	11	11	12	11	9	9	9	9	9	9	9	9	9	9	9	9	9	9	9	9	9	9	9	9	8	7	7	7	7

Updated to match(es) played on 19 May 2019. Source: Matches
A = Away; H = Home; W = Win; D = Draw; L = Loss

== Magyar Kupa ==
22 September 2018 Round 6	Komárom	1 – 3	Puskás Akadémia	Komárom, Komárom-Esztergom County
15:00 CEST	Végh 90+1'	Report	Hegedűs 11'; Mioc 71'; Vlasko 79'	Stadium: Molaji Sporttelep; Referee: (Hungary) Ákos Gaál

31 October 2018 Round 7	Dunaújváros	0 – 2	Puskás Akadémia	Dunaújváros, Fejér County
17:00 CET		Report	Latifi 5'; Radó 12' (pen.)	Stadium: Dunaferr Arena; Referee: (Hungary) Attila Molnár

4 December 2018 Round of 32	Pénzügyőr	0 – 6	Puskás Akadémia	Budapest, Pest County
11:00 CET		Report	Radó 29', 80'; Vega 49'; Latifi 57'; Osváth 85'; Zsidai 88'	Stadium: Pénzügyőr Sporttelep; Referee: (Hungary) Róbert Nagy

20 February 2019 Round of 16 (leg 1)	Puskás Akadémia	1 – 2	Paks	Felcsút, Fejér County
15:00 CET	Radó 49'	Report	Egerszegi 11'; Hahn 87' (pen.)	Stadium: Pancho Aréna; Attendance: 417; Referee: (Hungary) József Erdős

26 February 2019 Round of 16 (leg 2)	Paks	1 – 3 (3 – 4 agg.)	Puskás Akadémia	Paks, Tolna County
17:00 CET	Lenzsér 17'	Report	Latifi 23', 75', 82' (pen.)	Stadium: Fehérvári úti Stadion; Attendance: 400; Referee: (Hungary) Sándor Andó-Szabó

13 March 2019 Quarter-final (leg 1)	Puskás Akadémia	1 – 1	Soroksár	Felcsút, Fejér County
15:00 CET	Vega 40'	Report	Orosz 75'	Stadium: Pancho Aréna; Attendance: 300; Referee: (Hungary) Szabolcs Szilasi

3 April 2019 Quarter-final (leg 2)	Soroksár	1 – 1 (a.e.t.) (2 – 2 agg.) (5 – 4 p)	Puskás Akadémia	Budapest, Pest County
15:30 CEST	Lőrinczy 83'	Report	Arabuli 31'	Stadium: Szamosi Mihály Sporttelep; Attendance: 1,500; Referee: (Hungary) János Takács
	Penalties
	Bor (penalty scored); Lőrinczy (penalty missed); Huszák (penalty scored); Erdélyi (penalty scored); Orosz (penalty missed); Csernik (penalty scored); Dvorschák (penalty scored)		Szakály (penalty scored); Urblík (penalty scored); Hegedűs (penalty missed); Arabuli (penalty scored); Taylor (penalty missed); Nagy (penalty scored); Mioč (penalty missed)
