= 2017–18 Puskás Akadémia FC season =

Puskás Akadémia
2017–18 season
- Chairman: Felcsúti Utánpótlás Neveléséért Alapítvány
- Manager: Attila Pintér
- Nemzeti Bajnokság I: 6th
- Magyar Kupa: Runners-up
- Top goalscorer: League: Josip Knežević (11); All: Josip Knežević (15)
Home colours	Away colours

The 2017–18 season was Puskás Akadémia Football Club's 4th competitive season, 1st consecutive season in the Nemzeti Bajnokság I and 7th year in existence as a football club. In addition to the domestic league, Puskás Akadémia participated in this season's editions of the Magyar Kupa.

The club lost their first Magyar Kupa final in history after penalties against Budapest's Újpest.

== First team squad ==
As of 1 February, 2018.

Note: Flags indicate national team as defined under FIFA eligibility rules; some limited exceptions apply. Players may hold more than one non-FIFA nationality.

No.	Pos.	Nation	Player
1	GK	HUN	Balázs Tóth
6	DF	SVN	Dejan Trajkovski
7	FW	HUN	Márk Szécsi
8	MF	HUN	Dávid Márkvárt (captain)
9	FW	MLI	Ulysse Diallo
10	FW	HUN	András Radó
11	FW	HUN	Dániel Prosser
12	MF	HUN	Balázs Balogh
14	DF	BEL	Jonathan Heris
15	MF	CMR	Patrick Mevoungou
16	MF	URU	Gonzalo Vega
17	MF	HUN	László Zsidai
19	GK	HUN	Lajos Hegedűs
20	DF	HUN	Vilmos Vanczák

No.	Pos.	Nation	Player
21	DF	SVN	Denis Klinar
23	DF	HUN	Csaba Spandler
24	DF	HUN	Patrik Poór
27	MF	ALB	Liridon Latifi
28	MF	CRO	Stipe Bačelić-Grgić
30	MF	CRO	Josip Knežević
33	FW	HUN	Gábor Molnár
44	GK	SRB	Branislav Danilović
45	FW	NGA	Ezekiel Henty (loaned from Videoton)
55	MF	HUN	Péter Szakály
68	DF	HUN	János Hegedűs
71	DF	HUN	Attila Osváth
77	FW	CRO	Antonio Perošević
80	MF	HUN	Márk Madarász

=== Out on loan ===
Note: Flags indicate national team as defined under FIFA eligibility rules; some limited exceptions apply. Players may hold more than one non-FIFA nationality.

No.	Pos.	Nation	Player
13	DF	HUN	Ádám Csilus (at Nyíregyháza Spartacus FC)
18	MF	HUN	Attila Polonkai (at Csákvári TK)
22	DF	HUN	Zsolt Tar (at Csákvári TK)
25	DF	HUN	Zsolt Nagy (at Csákvári TK)

No.	Pos.	Nation	Player
32	DF	CRO	Ivor Horvat (at Csákvári TK)
—	DF	HUN	Ádám Lipcsei (at Csákvári TK)
—	MF	HUN	Dávid Mészáros (at Csákvári TK)

== Transfers ==
=== Summer ===
In: Note: Flags indicate national team as defined under FIFA eligibility rules; some limited exceptions apply. Players may hold more than one non-FIFA nationality.

No.	Pos.	Nation	Player
7	FW	HUN	Márk Szécsi (from Nyíregyháza)
9	FW	MLI	Ulysse Diallo (from Mezőkövesd)
10	FW	HUN	András Radó (from Ferencváros)
12	MF	HUN	Balázs Balogh (from Újpest)
14	DF	BEL	Jonathan Heris (from Újpest)
15	MF	CMR	Patrick Mevoungou (from Diósgyőr)
16	MF	HUN	Roland Sallai (from return from (Italy) Palermo)
24	DF	HUN	Patrik Poór (from MTK Budapest)
27	MF	ALB	Liridon Latifi (from (Albania) Skënderbeu Korçë)
28	MF	CRO	Stipe Bačelić-Grgić (from return from Mezőkövesd)
30	MF	CRO	Josip Knežević (from (Croatia) Osijek)
32	DF	CRO	Ivor Horvat (from (Slovenia) Koper)
33	FW	HUN	Gábor Molnár (from Mezőkövesd)
44	GK	SRB	Branislav Danilović (from return from Debrecen)
71	DF	HUN	Attila Osváth (from Vasas)
77	FW	CRO	Antonio Perošević (from (Croatia) Osijek)
80	MF	HUN	Márk Madarász (from Gyirmót)
—	DF	HUN	Ádám Lipcsei (from return from Csákvár)

Out: Note: Flags indicate national team as defined under FIFA eligibility rules; some limited exceptions apply. Players may hold more than one non-FIFA nationality.

No.	Pos.	Nation	Player
1	GK	HUN	Bence Gundel-Takács (to Újpest)
2	DF	HUN	Tibor Heffler (to Cegléd)
3	DF	HUN	Gyula Forró (to Nyíregyháza)
5	DF	HUN	Bence Tóth (to Videoton)
6	DF	HUN	Gábor Gyömbér (to Soroksár)
7	MF	UKR	Dmytro Lyopa (to (Croatia) Osijek)
7	MF	HUN	László Pekár (to Nyíregyháza)
10	FW	HUN	Zsolt Óvári (to Diósgyőr)
15	MF	HUN	Bence Szabó (to Videoton)
16	MF	HUN	Roland Sallai (to (Cyprus) APOEL Nicosia)
17	FW	HUN	Gábor Makrai (to Diósgyőr)
29	FW	HUN	László Lencse (to MTK Budapest)
23	GK	HUN	Krisztián Pogacsics (to Balmazújváros)
32	MF	HUN	Lóránd Szatmári (to Győr)
49	DF	SRB	Branko Pauljević (to Újpest)
52	DF	HUN	Alex Damásdi (to Cegléd)
91	DF	HUN	Gergő Vaszicsku (to Budafok)
—	DF	HUN	Ákos Fodor (to Kisvárda)
—	DF	HUN	Dániel Kertai (to Iváncsa)

=== Winter ===
In: Note: Flags indicate national team as defined under FIFA eligibility rules; some limited exceptions apply. Players may hold more than one non-FIFA nationality.

No.	Pos.	Nation	Player
—	DF	SVN	Denis Klinar (from (Slovenia) Olimpija Ljubljana)
—	MF	URU	Gonzalo Vega (from (Uruguay) River Plate)
—	DF	SVN	Dejan Trajkovski (from (Netherlands) Twente)

Out: Note: Flags indicate national team as defined under FIFA eligibility rules; some limited exceptions apply. Players may hold more than one non-FIFA nationality.

No.	Pos.	Nation	Player
9	MF	HUN	Martin Hudák (to Zalaegerszeg)

== Competitions ==
=== Overview ===
Competition	First match	Last match	Starting round	Final position	Record							
Competition	First match	Last match	Starting round	Final position	Pld	W	D	L	GF	GA	GD	Win %
Nemzeti Bajnokság I	16 July 2017	2 June 2018	Matchday 1	6th	33	11	10	12	41	46	−5	33.33
Magyar Kupa	20 September 2017	1 March 2023	Round of 128	Runners-up	10	6	1	3	21	7	+14	60.00
Total					43	17	11	15	62	53	+9	39.53

Source: Competitions

=== Nemzeti Bajnokság I ===
==== League table ====
Pos	Team	Pld	W	D	L	GF	GA	GD	Pts	Qualification or relegation
4	Honvéd	33	13	8	12	50	53	−3	47	Qualification for the Europa League first qualifying round (Note: Since the winners of the 2017–18 Magyar Kupa, Újpest, qualified for European competition based on league position, the spot awarded to the cup winners (Europa League first qualifying round) was passed to the fourth-placed team.)
5	Debrecen	33	12	8	13	53	47	+6	44	
6	Puskás Akadémia	33	11	10	12	41	46	−5	43	
7	Paks	33	11	9	13	43	48	−5	42	
8	Szombathelyi Haladás	33	11	5	17	35	50	−15	38	

Source: Hungarian Football Federation (in Hungarian), Soccerway
Rules for classification: 1) Points; 2) Matches won; 3) Goal difference; 4) Goals scored; 5) Head-to-head points; 6) Head-to-head goal difference; 7) Head-to-head away goals scored; 8) Fair play ranking; 9) Drawing of lots.

==== Results summary ====
Overall								Home						Away					
Pld	W	D	L	GF	GA	GD	Pts	W	D	L	GF	GA	GD	W	D	L	GF	GA	GD
33	11	10	12	41	46	−5	43	6	5	5	16	17	−1	5	5	7	25	29	−4

Source: Hungarian Football Federation

==== Results by round ====
Round	1	2	3	4	5	6	7	8	9	10	11	12	13	14	15	16	17	18	19	20	21	22	23	24	25	26	27	28	29	30	31	32	33
Ground	A	H	A	H	A	H	A	A	H	A	H	H	A	H	A	H	A	H	H	A	H	A	A	H	A	H	A	H	A	A	H	A	H
Result	D	L	L	L	D	W	W	W	W	L	L	D	L	D	L	W	D	L	W	D	D	L	L	D	W	D	W	W	L	W	L	D	W
Position	8	11	12	12	12	12	8	6	5	6	7	8	8	8	9	9	9	9	8	8	8	8	10	9	8	9	7	7	7	7	7	7	6

Source: Matches
A = Away; H = Home; W = Win; D = Draw; L = Loss

==== Matches ====
16 July 2017 1	Ferencváros	1–1	Puskás Akadémia	Budapest
17:00 CEST (UTC+2)	Batik (yellow card) 14'; Varga 42'; Pedro (yellow card) 45'; Koch (yellow card) 54'	Report	Vanczák (yellow card) 8'; Szakály 24', (yellow card) 24'; Márkvárt (yellow card) 45'; Poór (yellow card) 50'	Stadium: Groupama Arena; Attendance: 6,087; Referee: Sándor Andó-Szabó

23 July 2017 2	Puskás Akadémia	1–3	Videoton	Felcsút
18:00 CEST (UTC+2)	Diallo 2'; Spandler (yellow card) 16'; Vanczák (yellow card) 59'	Report	Fejes 14'; Lazović 27', (yellow card) 75'; Hadžić (yellow card) 31'; Juhász (yellow card) 51'; Šćepović 60' (pen.)	Stadium: Pancho Arena; Attendance: 1,983; Referee: Ádám Farkas

30 July 2017 3	Vasas	2–0	Puskás Akadémia	Budapest
18:00 CEST (UTC+2)	Burmeister 41'; Vaskó (yellow card) 59'; Kulcsár 74'	Report		Stadium: Szusza Ferenc Stadion; Attendance: 1,500; Referee: József Erdős

5 August 2017 4	Puskás Akadémia	0–2	Honvéd	Felcsút
20:30 CEST (UTC+2)	Márkvárt (yellow card) 34'; Heris (yellow card) 68'	Report	Bobál (yellow card) 21'; Lovrić (yellow card) 35'; Lanzafame 45'; Eppel 60'	Stadium: Pancho Arena; Attendance: 1,786; Referee: Tamás Bognár

12 August 2017 5	Diósgyőr	2–2	Puskás Akadémia	Debrecen
18:00 CEST (UTC+2)	Makrai 10'; Busai (yellow card) 55'; Karan (yellow card) 64'; Vela 89'	Report	Heris 4'; Spandler (yellow card) 13'; Prosser 75'; Márkvárt (yellow card) 82'	Stadium: Nagyerdei Stadion; Attendance: 2,514; Referee: Zoltán Iványi

19 August 2017 6	Puskás Akadémia	2–1	Balmazújváros	Felcsút
18:00 CEST (UTC+2)	Molnár 9'; Diallo (yellow card) 38'; Knežević 45', (yellow card) 80'; J. Hegedűs (yellow card) 63'; Mevoungou (yellow card) 67'	Report	Arabuli (yellow card) 38', (goal) 64' (pen.); Sigér (yellow card) 52'; Kovács (yellow card) 90+3'	Stadium: Pancho Arena; Attendance: 814; Referee: Péter Solymosi

26 August 2017 7	Haladás	1–5	Puskás Akadémia	Sopron
18:00 CEST (UTC+2)	Mi. Németh (yellow card) 9'; Kovács 16', (yellow card) 54'; Mészáros (yellow card) 33'; Király (yellow card) 58'	Report	Márkvárt (yellow card) 11'; Balogh (yellow card) 34'; Molnár 39'; Szakály (yellow card) 44'; Knežević 53' (pen.), 66'; Diallo (yellow card) 62', (goal) 81', 90'; Osváth (yellow card) 65'	Stadium: Káposztás utcai Stadion; Attendance: 1,075; Referee: Ádám Farkas

9 September 2017 8	Újpest	1–3	Puskás Akadémia	Budapest
20:30 CEST (UTC+2)	Zsótér (yellow card) 61'; Novothny 72'	Report	Diallo 22'; Osváth (yellow card) 29'; Knežević 49' (pen.), 53', (yellow card) 87'	Stadium: Szusza Ferenc Stadion; Attendance: 0 Referee: Sándor Andó-Szabó

16 September 2017 9	Puskás Akadémia	1–0	Mezőkövesd	Felcsút
18:00 CEST (UTC+2)	Prosser (yellow card) 52'; Diallo 57'; Mevoungou (yellow card) 83'	Report	Hudák (yellow card) 14'; Veselinović (yellow card) 25'; Szeles (yellow card) 65'; Baracskai (yellow card) 82'; Tóth (yellow card) 87'	Stadium: Pancho Arena; Attendance: 811; Referee: Zoltán Iványi

23 September 2017 10	Debrecen	3–0	Puskás Akadémia	Debrecen
18:00 CEST (UTC+2)	Varga 44', (yellow card) 59'; Könyves 82'; Tőzsér 86'	Report	Osváth (yellow card) 37'; Diallo (yellow card) 90+2'	Stadium: Nagyerdei Stadion; Attendance: 3,241; Referee: Jószef Erdős

30 September 2017 11	Puskás Akadémia	1–2	Paks	Felcsút
18:00 CEST (UTC+2)	Knežević 79'; Osváth (yellow card) 82'	Report	Á. Simon 63', (yellow card) 74'; Bertus 71'; Verpecz (yellow card) 78'	Stadium: Pancho Arena; Attendance: 823; Referee: Gergely Szőts

14 October 2017 12	Puskás Akadémia	1–1	Ferencváros	Felcsút
19:30 CEST (UTC+2)	Vanczák (yellow card) 59'; Latifi (yellow card) 68'; Knežević (yellow card) 79', (goal) 86' (pen.)	Report	Paintsil 39'; Leandro (yellow card) 74'; Blažič (yellow card) 74'; Otigba (yellow card) 79'; Botka (yellow card) 90'	Stadium: Pancho Arena; Attendance: 3,127; Referee: Tamás Bognár

21 October 2017 13	Videoton	2–0	Puskás Akadémia	Budapest
15:30 CEST (UTC+2)	Fiola (yellow card) 50'; Vinícius (yellow card) 50'; Henty (yellow card) 83', (goal) 90+1'; Juhász 88'; Lazović (yellow card) 90+2'	Report	Perošević (yellow card) 29'; Balogh (yellow card) 56'; Mevoungou (yellow card) 90+1'	Stadium: Hidegkuti Nándor Stadion; Attendance: 1,108; Referee: Viktor Kassai

28 October 2017 14	Puskás Akadémia	0–0	Vasas	Felcsút
17:45 CEST (UTC+2)	Bačelić-Grgić (yellow card) 52'; Vanczák (yellow card) 60'	Report	Ádám (yellow card) 44'; Burmeister (yellow card) 76'	Stadium: Pancho Arena; Attendance: 986; Referee: Ádám Farkas

4 November 2017 15	Honvéd	4–3	Puskás Akadémia	Budapest
19:30 CET (UTC+1)	Holender 23'; Pölöskei (yellow card) 27'; Lanzafame 58', 87'; Banó-Szabó (yellow card) 65'; Cirino (yellow card) 83', (goal) 90+3'	Report	Szakály 52'; Knežević 55', 71'; Mevoungou (red card) 90'; Márkvárt (yellow card) 90+4'	Stadium: Bozsik József Stadion; Attendance: 2,105; Referee: Csaba Pintér

18 November 2017 16	Puskás Akadémia	1–0	Diósgyőr	Felcsút
15:30 CET (UTC+1)	Knežević (yellow card) 9', (goal) 63'; Vanczák (yellow card) 47'; Szécsi (yellow card) 76'; Balogh (yellow card) 90+2'	Report	Forgács (yellow card) 37'; Busai (yellow card) 90+1'	Stadium: Pancho Arena; Attendance: 1,516; Referee: Sándor Andó-Szabó

25 November 2017 17	Balmazújváros	2–2	Puskás Akadémia	Balmazújváros
15:30 CET (UTC+1)	Sigér 43'; Szécsi (yellow card) 55'; Fekete 87'; Maisuradze (yellow card) 88'	Report	Szakály 15'; Knežević (yellow card) 55'; Perošević 61'; Márkvárt (yellow card) 70'; Zsidai (yellow card) 84'	Stadium: Városi Sportpálya; Attendance: 714; Referee: Balázs Berkes

2 December 2017 18	Puskás Akadémia	1–3	Haladás	Felcsút
15:30 CET (UTC+1)	Szakály 3'; Vanczák (yellow card) 38'; Spandler (yellow card) 58'	Report	Ramos 14' (pen.), 90+4'; Mészáros (yellow card) 42'; Wils 59'; Halmosi (yellow card) 71'; Jagodics (yellow card) 84'	Stadium: Pancho Arena; Attendance: 712; Referee: István Vad

9 December 2017 19	Puskás Akadémia	2–1	Újpest	Felcsút
15:30 CET (UTC+1)	Knežević (yellow card) 3'; Diallo (yellow card) 7'; Perošević 37', (yellow card) 38'; Spandler (yellow card) 71'; Csilus (yellow card) 74'	Report	Novothny (yellow card) 43'; Nwobodo 58', (yellow card) 83'; Tischler (yellow card) 64'	Stadium: Pancho Arena; Attendance: 1,328; Referee: Zoltán Iványi

24 February 2018 20	Mezőkövesd	0–0	Puskás Akadémia	Mezőkövesd
17:00 CET (UTC+1)	Pillár (yellow card) 28'	Report	Mevoungou (yellow card) 21'; Klinar (yellow card) 73'; Knežević (yellow card) 90+2'	Stadium: Városi Stadion; Attendance: 1,500; Referee: Balázs Berke

3 March 2018 21	Puskás Akadémia	0–0	Debrecen	Felcsút
17:00 CET (UTC+1)	Heris (yellow card) 70'	Report	Szatmári (yellow card) 76'	Stadium: Pancho Arena; Attendance: 200; Referee: Sándor Andó-Szabó

10 March 2018 22	Paks	3–1	Puskás Akadémia	Paks
17:00 CET (UTC+1)	Vági (yellow card) 12'; Bartha 33'; Hahn (yellow card) 44'; Bertus 61', 64'; Á. Simon (yellow card) 70'; Kulcsár (yellow card) 82'; Gévay (yellow card) 87'	Report	Klinar (yellow card) 48'; Perošević (yellow card) 57'; Trajkovski 62', (yellow card) 90+4'; Bačelić-Grgić (yellow card) 63'; Spandler (yellow card) 74'	Stadium: Fehérvári úti Stadion; Attendance: 860; Referee: Ferenc Karakó

17 March 2018 23	Ferencváros	3–1	Puskás Akadémia	Budapest
19:30 CET (UTC+1)	Moutari (yellow card) 33'; Paintsil (red card) 38'; Otigba 41'; Böde (yellow card) 74', (goal) 90+3'; Nagy (yellow card) 80'; Blažič 90'	Report	Henty 25', (red card) 81'; Knežević (yellow card) 36'; Zsidai (yellow card) 37'; Perošević (yellow card) 81'	Stadium: Groupama Arena; Attendance: 8,411; Referee: Csaba Pintér

31 March 2018 24	Puskás Akadémia	0–0	Videoton	Felcsút
17:00 CEST (UTC+2)	Zsidai (yellow card) 41'; Osváth (yellow card) 68'; Trajkovski (yellow card) 87'	Report	Juhász (yellow card) 11'; Fiola (yellow card) 25'; Hadžić (yellow card) 41'; Lazović (yellow card) 64'	Stadium: Pancho Arena; Attendance: 1,825; Referee: Zsolt Szabó

7 April 2018 25	Vasas	1–2	Puskás Akadémia	Budapest
17:00 CEST (UTC+2)	Berecz (yellow card) 45'; Vaskó (yellow card) 80'; Mevoungou 90+4' (o.g.)	Report	Trajkovski (yellow card) 15'; Spandler 22'; Diallo (yellow card) 22'; Poór (yellow card) 68'; Mevoungou (yellow card) 75'; Radó 84'	Stadium: Szusza Ferenc Stadion; Attendance: 1,200; Referee: Zoltán Iványi

14 April 2018 26	Puskás Akadémia	1–1	Honvéd	Felcsút
17:00 CEST (UTC+2)	J. Hegedűs 34'; L. Hegedűs (yellow card) 76'; Szakály (yellow card) 90+2'	Report	Danilo (yellow card) 28', (goal) 86'; Kukoč (yellow card) 90+3'	Stadium: Pancho Arena; Attendance: 800; Referee: Gergely Szőts

21 April 2018 27	Diósgyőr	0–1	Puskás Akadémia	Mezőkövesd
17:00 CEST (UTC+2)	Tamás (yellow card) 9'; Ugrai (yellow card) 48'; Ioannidis (yellow card) 48'; Eperjesi (yellow card) 88'	Report	Szakály 24'; Henty (yellow card) 31'; J. Hegedűs (yellow card) 48'; Knežević (yellow card) 50'; Trajkovski (yellow card) 90+6'	Stadium: Városi Stadion; Attendance: 1,262; Referee: Tamás Bognár

28 April 2018 28	Puskás Akadémia	3–1	Balmazújváros	Felcsút
17:00 CEST (UTC+2)	Szakály (yellow card) 10'; Knežević 21'; Zsidai (yellow card) 56'; Diallo (yellow card) 71', (goal) 90+5'; Radó 80'	Report	Erdei 16', (yellow card) 17'; Tamás (yellow card) 22'; Vayda (yellow card) 90+2'	Stadium: Pancho Arena; Attendance: 783; Referee: Balázs Berke

5 May 2018 29	Haladás	3–2	Puskás Akadémia	Szombathely
17:00 CEST (UTC+2)	Halmosi (yellow card) 6'; Mészáros 13'; Wils 68'; Williams 71'; Mi. Németh (yellow card) 75'; Kovács (yellow card) 83'; Bošnjak (yellow card) 90+2'	Report	Henty 5' (pen.), 82'; J. Hegedűs (yellow card) 12'; Spandler (yellow card) 39'; Poór (yellow card) 67'; Márkvárt (yellow card) 84'; Perošević (yellow card) 90+3'	Stadium: Haladás Sportkomplexum; Attendance: 4,133; Referee: Sándor Andó-Szabó

12 May 2018 30	Újpest	0–1	Puskás Akadémia	Budapest
17:00 CEST (UTC+2)	Litauszki (yellow card) 37'; Diallo (yellow card) 67'; Szűcs (yellow card) 75'; Bureković (yellow card) 90'	Report	Knežević (yellow card) 44'; Molnár (yellow card) 59'; Márkvárt 64'	Stadium: Szusza Ferenc Stadion; Attendance: 2,040; Referee: Ferenc Karakó

19 May 2018 31	Puskás Akadémia	1–2	Mezőkövesd	Felcsút
17:00 CEST (UTC+2)	Perošević (yellow card) 33'; J. Hegedűs 82', (yellow card) 90+1'	Report	Pillár 11'; Cseri 40'; Koszta (yellow card) 88'	Stadium: Pancho Arena; Attendance: 882; Referee: Péter Solymosi

27 May 2018 32	Debrecen	1–1	Puskás Akadémia	Debrecen
17:00 CEST (UTC+2)	Tabaković 57', (yellow card) 84'; Varga (yellow card) 77'; Bódi (yellow card) 90+3'	Report	Radó 10'; Márkvárt (yellow card) 36'; Klinar (yellow card) 38'; Bačelić-Grgić (red card) 63'; L. Hegedűs (yellow card) 84'	Stadium: Nagyerdei Stadion; Attendance: 2,414; Referee: Tamás Bognár

2 June 2018 33	Puskás Akadémia	1–0	Paks	Felcsút
19:00 CEST (UTC+2)	Klinar (yellow card) 42'; Balogh (yellow card) 69'; Radó 71'	Report	Gévay (yellow card) 23'; Szabó (yellow card) 30'; Á. Simon (yellow card) 36'; Zachán (red card) 62'	Stadium: Pancho Arena; Attendance: 800; Referee: József Erdős

=== Magyar Kupa ===
20 September 2017 Round of 128	Kaposvár	1–3	Puskás Akadémia	Kaposvár
20:00 CEST (UTC+2)	Lakatos 55'; Ur (red card) 73'	Report	Prosser 27'; Perošević 51'; Osváth (yellow card) 54'; Latifi 74'	Stadium: Rákóczi Stadion; Attendance: 300; Referee: Szabolcs Szilasi

25 October 2017 Round of 64	Eger	0–6	Puskás Akadémia	Eger
13:30 CEST (UTC+2)	Balogh (yellow card) 7'; Molnár (yellow card) 87'	Report	Prosser 22', 50', 65'; Balogh (yellow card) 34'; Knežević 44'; Titkó 56' (o.g.); Madarász 63'	Stadium: Szentmarjay Tibor Városi Stadion; Attendance: 600; Referee: Katalin Kulcsár

28 November 2017 Round of 32	Kisvárda	0–1	Puskás Akadémia	Kisvárda
12:00 CET (UTC+1)	Heffler (yellow card) 7'; Gosztonyi (yellow card) 52'; Papucsek (yellow card) 76'	Report	Diallo 18'; Molnár (yellow card) 39'; Osváth (yellow card) 73'; Bačelić-Grgić (yellow card) 80'; Balogh (yellow card) 90+2'	Stadium: Várkert Sportpálya; Attendance: 1,050; Referee: Viktor Kassai

==== Round of 16 ====
20 February 2018 First Leg	Zalaegerszeg	1–0	Puskás Akadémia	Zalaegerszeg
16:00 CET (UTC+1)	Vernes 65' (pen.); Patvaros (yellow card) 69'; Fodor (yellow card) 70'	Report	Klinar (yellow card) 76'	Stadium: ZTE Arena; Attendance: 428; Referee: Gergő Bogár

28 February 2018 Second Leg	Puskás Akadémia	2–0 (a.e.t.) (2–1 agg.)	Zalaegerszeg	Felcsút
19:00 CET (UTC+1)	Diallo 56'; Perošević (yellow card) 69', (goal) 110'; Knežević (yellow card) 81'; Spandler (yellow card) 83'	Report	Hudák (yellow card) 68'; Devecseri (yellow card) 81'	Stadium: Pancho Arena; Attendance: 200; Referee: Péter Solymosi
Note: Puskás Akadémia won 2-1 on aggregate.

==== Quarter-finals ====
13 March 2018 First Leg	Puskás Akadémia	0–1	Diósgyőr	Felcsút
17:00 CET (UTC+1)	Klinar (yellow card) 28'; Zsidai (yellow card) 85'	Report	Ioannidis 34'; Ugrai (yellow card) 39'; Tóth (yellow card) 45'; Brković (yellow card) 51'; Bacsa (yellow card) 90+4'	Stadium: Pancho Arena; Attendance: 778; Referee: Gergely Szőts

4 April 2018 Second Leg	Diósgyőr	0–3 (1–3 agg.)	Puskás Akadémia	Mezőkövesd
18:00 CEST (UTC+2)	Nagy (yellow card) 24'; Ioannidis (yellow card) 45'; Szarka (yellow card) 50'; Brković (yellow card) 55'; Ugrai (yellow card) 77'	Report	Perošević 40'; Knežević 49'; Henty 85'	Stadium: Városi Stadion; Attendance: 1,750; Referee: Ádám Farkas
Note: Puskás Akadémia won 3-1 on aggregate.

==== Semi-finals ====
18 April 2018 First Leg	Puskás Akadémia	4–0	Debrecen	Felcsút
20:15 CEST (UTC+2)	Henty 2', 31'; Perošević 43'; Poór (yellow card) 54'; Knežević 80'	Report	Bényei (yellow card) 23'; Kinyik (red card) 42'	Stadium: Pancho Arena; Attendance: 818; Referee: József Erdős

8 May 2018 Second Leg	Debrecen	2–0 (2–4 agg.)	Puskás Akadémia	Debrecen
20:00 CEST (UTC+2)	Tisza 38'; Takács 50'; Szatmári (yellow card) 71'; Tőzsér (yellow card) 89'	Report	Henty (yellow card) 31'	Stadium: Nagyerdei Stadion; Attendance: 855; Referee: Zoltán Iványi
Note: Puskás Akadémia won 4-2 on aggregate.

==== Final ====
23 May 2018 Final	Puskás Akadémia	2–2 (a.e.t.) (4–5 p)	Újpest	Budapest
20:00 CEST (UTC+2)	Knežević 38'; Márkvárt (yellow card) 60'; Perošević 66'; J. Hegedűs (yellow card) 109'; L. Hegedűs (yellow card) 113'	Report	Zsótér 55', (yellow card) 88'; Bojović 62'; Nwobodo (yellow card) 105'; Pauljević (yellow card) 113'	Stadium: Groupama Arena; Attendance: 11,270; Referee: Sándor Andó-Szabó
	Penalties
	Perošević (penalty scored); Bačelić-Grgić (penalty scored); Diallo (penalty scored); Henty (penalty missed); Balogh (penalty scored); J. Hegedűs (penalty missed)		(penalty scored) Onovo; (penalty scored) Litauszki; (penalty scored) Diallo; (penalty missed) Balázs; (penalty scored) Zsótér; (penalty scored) Bojović
Note: Újpest won 5–4 on penalties.

== Statistics ==
=== Appearances and goals ===
No.	Pos	Nat	Player	Total		Nemzeti Bajnokság I		Magyar Kupa	
No.	Pos	Nat	Player	Apps	Goals	Apps	Goals	Apps	Goals
6	DF	(Slovenia) SVN	Dejan Trajkovski	20	1	13	1	7	0
7	FW	(Hungary) HUN	Márk Szécsi	14	0	12	0	2	0
8	MF	(Hungary) HUN	Dávid Márkvárt	30	1	25	1	5	0
9	FW	(Mali) MLI	Ulysse Diallo	33	9	25	7	8	2
10	FW	(Hungary) HUN	András Radó	17	4	14	4	3	0
11	FW	(Hungary) HUN	Dániel Prosser	20	5	13	1	7	4
12	MF	(Hungary) HUN	Balázs Balogh	35	0	29	0	6	0
14	DF	(Belgium) BEL	Jonathan Heris	25	1	22	1	3	0
15	MF	(Cameroon) CMR	Patrick Mevoungou	26	0	24	0	2	0
17	MF	(Hungary) HUN	László Zsidai	18	0	11	0	7	0
19	GK	(Hungary) HUN	Lajos Hegedűs	38	0	30	0	8	0
20	DF	(Hungary) HUN	Vilmos Vanczák	17	0	15	0	2	0
21	DF	(Slovenia) SVN	Denis Klinar	10	0	7	0	3	0
23	DF	(Hungary) HUN	Csaba Spandler	32	1	22	1	10	0
24	DF	(Hungary) HUN	Patrik Poór	23	0	17	0	6	0
27	MF	(Albania) ALB	Liridon Latifi	14	1	12	0	2	1
28	MF	(Croatia) CRO	Stipe Bačelić-Grgić	24	0	19	0	5	0
30	MF	(Croatia) CRO	Josip Knežević	36	15	27	11	9	4
33	MF	(Hungary) HUN	Gábor Molnár	34	2	26	2	8	0
44	GK	(Serbia) SRB	Branislav Danilović	5	0	3	0	2	0
45	FW	(Nigeria) NGA	Ezekiel Henty	17	6	11	3	6	3
55	MF	(Hungary) HUN	Péter Szakály	29	5	23	5	6	0
68	DF	(Hungary) HUN	János Hegedűs	20	2	14	2	6	0
71	FW	(Hungary) HUN	Attila Osváth	18	0	14	0	4	0
77	FW	(Croatia) CRO	Antonio Perošević	30	7	22	2	8	5
80	MF	(Hungary) HUN	Márk Madarász	7	1	2	0	5	1
Youth players:
Out to loan:
13	DF	(Hungary) HUN	Ádám Csilus	3	0	3	0	0	0
18	MF	(Hungary) HUN	Attila Polonkai	1	0	1	0	0	0
25	DF	(Hungary) HUN	Zsolt Nagy	1	0	1	0	0	0
32	DF	(Croatia) CRO	Ivor Horvat	1	0	1	0	0	0
Players no longer at the club:
16	MF	(Hungary) HUN	Roland Sallai	1	0	1	0	0	0

=== Top scorers ===
Includes all competitive matches. The list is sorted by shirt number when total goals are equal.

Position	Nation	Number	Name	Nemzeti Bajnokság I	Magyar Kupa	Total
1	(Croatia)	30	Josip Knežević	11	4	15
2	(Mali)	9	Ulysse Diallo	7	2	9
3	(Croatia)	77	Antonio Perošević	2	5	7
4	(Nigeria)	45	Ezekiel Henty	3	3	6
5	(Hungary)	11	Dániel Prosser	1	4	5
5	(Hungary)	55	Péter Szakály	5	0	5
7	(Hungary)	10	András Radó	4	0	4
8	(Hungary)	33	Gábor Molnár	2	0	2
8	(Hungary)	68	János Hegedűs	2	0	2
10	(Slovenia)	6	Dejan Trajkovski	1	0	1
10	(Hungary)	8	Dávid Márkvárt	1	0	1
10	(Belgium)	14	Jonathan Heris	1	0	1
10	(Hungary)	23	Csaba Spandler	1	0	1
10	(Albania)	27	Liridon Latifi	0	1	1
10	(Hungary)	80	Márk Madarász	0	1	1
/	/	/	Own Goals	0	1	1
			TOTALS	41	21	62

=== Disciplinary record ===
Includes all competitive matches. Players with 1 card or more included only.

Position	Nation	Number	Name	Nemzeti Bajnokság I		Magyar Kupa		Total (Hu Total)	
Position	Nation	Number	Name	Booked	Sent off (straight red)	Booked	Sent off (straight red)	Booked	Sent off (straight red)
DF	(Slovenia)	6	Dejan Trajkovski	4	0	0	0	4 (4)	0 (0)
FW	(Hungary)	7	Márk Szécsi	1	0	0	0	1 (1)	0 (0)
MF	(Hungary)	8	Dávid Márkvárt	8	0	1	0	9 (8)	0 (0)
FW	(Mali)	9	Ulysse Diallo	5	0	0	0	5 (5)	0 (0)
FW	(Hungary)	11	Dániel Prosser	1	0	1	0	2 (1)	0 (0)
MF	(Hungary)	12	Balázs Balogh	4	0	2	0	6 (4)	0 (0)
DF	(Hungary)	13	Ádám Csilus	1	0	0	0	1 (1)	0 (0)
DF	(Belgium)	14	Jonathan Heris	2	0	0	0	2 (2)	0 (0)
MF	(Cameroon)	15	Patrick Mevoungou	5	1	0	0	5 (5)	1 (1)
MF	(Hungary)	17	László Zsidai	4	0	1	0	5 (4)	0 (0)
GK	(Hungary)	19	Lajos Hegedűs	2	0	1	0	3 (2)	0 (0)
DF	(Hungary)	20	Vilmos Vanczák	6	0	0	0	6 (6)	0 (0)
DF	(Slovenia)	21	Denis Klinar	4	0	2	0	6 (4)	0 (0)
DF	(Hungary)	23	Csaba Spandler	6	0	1	0	7 (6)	0 (0)
DF	(Hungary)	24	Patrik Poór	3	0	1	0	4 (3)	0 (0)
MF	(Albania)	27	Liridon Latifi	1	0	0	0	1 (1)	0 (0)
MF	(Croatia)	28	Stipe Bačelić-Grgić	2	1	1	0	3 (2)	1 (1)
MF	(Croatia)	30	Josip Knežević	10	0	1	0	11 (10)	0 (0)
MF	(Hungary)	33	Gábor Molnár	1	0	1	0	2 (1)	0 (0)
FW	(Nigeria)	45	Ezekiel Henty	1	1	1	0	2 (1)	1 (1)
MF	(Hungary)	55	Péter Szakály	4	0	0	0	4 (4)	0 (0)
DF	(Hungary)	68	János Hegedűs	4	0	1	0	5 (4)	0 (0)
DF	(Hungary)	71	Attila Osváth	5	0	2	0	7 (5)	0 (0)
FW	(Croatia)	77	Antonio Perošević	6	0	1	0	7 (6)	0 (0)
			TOTALS	90	3	18	0	108 (90)	3 (3)

=== Clean sheets ===
Position	Nation	Number	Name	Nemzeti Bajnokság I	Magyar Kupa	Total
1	(Hungary)	19	Lajos Hegedűs	9	4	13
2	(Serbia)	44	Branislav Danilović	0	1	1
			TOTALS	9	5	14
