= 2019–20 Puskás Akadémia FC season =

Puskás Akadémia
2019–20 season
- Chairman: Felcsúti Utánpótlás Neveléséért Alapítvány
- Manager: Zsolt Hornyák
- Stadium: Pancho Aréna
- Nemzeti Bajnokság I: 3rd
- Magyar Kupa: Quarter-finals
- Top goalscorer: League: David Vaněček (11); All: Ádám Gyurcsó (15)
- Highest home attendance: 3,846 vs Ferencváros (25 August 2019)
- Lowest home attendance: 150 vs Kaposvár (10 June 2020)
Home colours	Away colours	Third colours

The 2019–20 season was Puskás Akadémia Football Club's 6th competitive season, 3rd consecutive season in the Nemzeti Bajnokság I and 8th year in existence as a football club.In addition to the domestic league, Puskás Akadémia participated in this season's editions of the Magyar Kupa.

== Transfers ==
=== Summer ===
In: Note: Flags indicate national team as defined under FIFA eligibility rules; some limited exceptions apply. Players may hold more than one non-FIFA nationality.

No.	Pos.	Nation	Player
1	GK	HUN	Balázs Tóth (loan return from Csákvár)
4	DF	ROU	Adrian Rus (loan return from (Romania) Sepsi)
5	DF	GER	Thomas Meißner (from (Netherlands) Willem II)
6	MF	NED	Yoell van Nieff (from (Netherlands) Heracles)
7	FW	AUS	Golgol Mebrahtu (from (Czech Republic) Sparta Prague)
7	FW	HUN	Márk Szécsi (loan return from Debrecen)
9	FW	HUN	Bence Sós (from Fehérvár)
11	MF	HUN	Dániel Prosser (loan return from Diósgyőr)
13	DF	HUN	Ádám Csilus (loan return from Csákvár)
17	FW	CZE	David Vaněček (from (Scotland) Hearts)
18	DF	HUN	András Huszti (from Tiszakécske)
33	FW	HUN	Gábor Molnár (loan return from Mezőkövesd)
45	FW	NGR	Ezekiel Henty (loan return from (Croatia) Osijek)
77	FW	CRO	Antonio Perošević (loan return from (United Arab Emirates) Al-Ittihad)
80	MF	ROU	Lóránd Fülöp (from (Romania) Botoșani)
80	MF	HUN	Márk Madarász (loan return from Győr)
—	FW	HUN	Ádám Gyurcsó (loan from (Croatia) Hajduk Split)
—	GK	HUN	László Laky (from Puskás Akadémia II)
—	MF	HUN	Márton Radics (from Puskás Akadémia II)
—	MF	HUN	Alen Skribek (from Puskás Akadémia II)

Out: Note: Flags indicate national team as defined under FIFA eligibility rules; some limited exceptions apply. Players may hold more than one non-FIFA nationality.

No.	Pos.	Nation	Player
3	DF	SVK	Richard Križan (to (Slovakia) Trenčín)
4	DF	ROU	Adrian Rus (to Fehérvár)
5	MF	CRO	Benedik Mioč (loan return to (Croatia) Osijek)
6	DF	SLO	Dejan Trajkovski
7	FW	GEO	Bachana Arabuli (to (Greece) Panionios)
7	FW	HUN	Márk Szécsi (to Debrecen)
9	FW	HUN	Bence Sós (loan return to Fehérvár)
10	MF	HUN	András Radó (to Zalaegerszeg)
11	MF	HUN	Dániel Prosser (to Diósgyőr)
12	MF	HUN	Balázs Balogh (to Paks)
13	DF	HUN	Ádám Csilus
14	DF	BEL	Jonathan Heris
16	MF	URU	Gonzalo Vega (to (Uruguay) Rentisas)
24	DF	HUN	Patrik Poór (to Paks)
27	MF	ALB	Liridon Latifi (to (Moldova) Sheriff Tiraspol)
33	FW	HUN	Gábor Molnár (to Mezőkövesd)
44	GK	SRB	Branislav Danilović (to Diósgyőr)
55	MF	HUN	Péter Szakály (to Újpest)
71	DF	HUN	Attila Osváth (to Paks)
77	FW	CRO	Antonio Perošević
77	FW	PAN	Tony Taylor
80	MF	HUN	Márk Madarász (loan to Csákvár)
99	GK	HUN	Ádám Varga (to Tiszakécske)

=== Winter ===
In: Note: Flags indicate national team as defined under FIFA eligibility rules; some limited exceptions apply. Players may hold more than one non-FIFA nationality.

No.	Pos.	Nation	Player
11	FW	NED	Luciano Slagveer (from (Netherlands) Emmen)
14	MF	UKR	Artem Favorov (from (Ukraine) Desna Chernihiv)
15	MF	CZE	Jakub Plšek (from (Czech Republic) Sigma Olomouc)
51	FW	HUN	Zsolt Magyar (from Puskás Akadémia U-19)
97	FW	HUN	György Komáromi (from Puskás Akadémia U-19)
99	DF	HUN	László Deutsch (from Puskás Akadémia U-19)
—	MF	HUN	Botond Nándori (from Puskás Akadémia U-19)
—	GK	HUN	Martin Auerbach (from Puskás Akadémia U-19)

Out: Note: Flags indicate national team as defined under FIFA eligibility rules; some limited exceptions apply. Players may hold more than one non-FIFA nationality.

No.	Pos.	Nation	Player
11	FW	NGR	Ezekiel Henty (to (Slovakia) Slovan Bratislava)
21	MF	HUN	Tamás Kiss (loan to Diósgyőr)
27	FW	HUN	Alen Skribek (loan to Budafok)
80	MF	ROU	Lóránd Fülöp (loan to (Romania) Sepsi)
—	GK	HUN	László Laky (to Kaposvár)

== Nemzeti Bajnokság I ==
=== League table ===
Pos	Team	Pld	W	D	L	GF	GA	GD	Pts	Qualification or relegation
1	Ferencváros (C)	33	23	7	3	58	24	+34	76	Qualification for the Champions League first qualifying round
2	Fehérvár	33	18	9	6	56	29	+27	63	Qualification for the Europa League first qualifying round
3	Puskás Akadémia	33	14	12	7	52	41	+11	54	Qualification for the Europa League first qualifying round
4	Mezőkövesd	33	14	8	11	42	31	+11	50	
5	Honvéd	33	12	8	13	36	44	−8	44	Qualification for the Europa League first qualifying round (Note: Budapest Honvéd qualified for the Europa League first qualifying round by winning the 2019–20 Magyar Kupa.)

Source: Hungarian Football Federation (in Hungarian), Soccerway
Rules for classification: 1) Points; 2) Matches won; 3) Goal difference; 4) Goals scored; 5) Head-to-head points; 6) Head-to-head goal difference; 7) Head-to-head away goals scored; 8) Fair play ranking; 9) Drawing of lots.
(C) Champions

=== Results summary ===
Overall								Home						Away					
Pld	W	D	L	GF	GA	GD	Pts	W	D	L	GF	GA	GD	W	D	L	GF	GA	GD
33	14	12	7	52	41	+11	54	7	4	5	27	23	+4	7	8	2	25	18	+7

Source: NB1

=== Results by round ===
Round	1	2	3	4	5	6	7	8	9	10	11	12	13	14	15	16	17	18	19	20	21	22	23	24	25	26	27	28	29	30	31	32	33
Ground	A	H	A	H	A	H	A	A	H	A	H	H	A	H	A	H	A	H	H	A	H	A	A	H	A	H	A	H	A	A	H	A	H
Result	W	L	L	W	D	W	W	D	W	W	L	L	W	D	D	L	D	D	D	W	W	D	W	L	D	D	L	W	D	W	W	D	W
Position	2	6	8	6	6	4	4	4	4	4	4	4	4	4	4	4	4	4	4	4	4	4	4	4	4	5	5	4	4	4	4	3	3

Source: Matches
A = Away; H = Home; W = Win; D = Draw; L = Loss

=== Matches ===
3 August 2019 1	Újpest	1–3	Puskás Akadémia	Budapest
19:30 CEST (UTC+2)	Balázs 52'	Report	Henty 13', 31'; Knežević 69'	Stadium: Illovszky Rudolf Stadion; Attendance: 2,707; Referee: István Vad

11 August 2019 2	Puskás Akadémia	0–2	Fehérvár	Felcsút
18:00 CEST (UTC+2)		Report	Huszti 48' (pen.); Futács 80'	Stadium: Pancho Aréna; Attendance: 1,712; Referee: Viktor Kassai

17 August 2019 3	Mezőkövesd	1–0	Puskás Akadémia	Mezőkövesd
19:30 CEST (UTC+2)	Cseri 46'	Report		Stadium: Városi Stadion; Attendance: 2,214; Referee: Tamás Bognár

25 August 2019 4	Puskás Akadémia	4–1	Ferencváros	Felcsút
18:00 CEST (UTC+2)	Sós 40'; Knežević 58' (pen.); Urblík 79', 84'	Report	Spirovski 13'	Stadium: Pancho Aréna; Attendance: 3,846; Referee: Balázs Berke

31 August 2019 5	Zalaegerszeg	1–1	Puskás Akadémia	Zalaegerszeg
19:30 CEST (UTC+2)	Radó 43' (pen.)	Report	Vaněček 36'	Stadium: ZTE Arena; Attendance: 4,858; Referee: Gergő Bogár

14 September 2019 6	Puskás Akadémia	2–0	Kaposvár	Felcsút
17:00 CEST (UTC+2)	Vaněček 47', 49'	Report		Stadium: Pancho Aréna; Attendance: 1,022; Referee: Ádám Farkas

28 September 2019 7	Debrecen	1–2	Puskás Akadémia	Debrecen
17:00 CEST (UTC+2)	Szécsi 82'	Report	Gyurcsó 10', 43'	Stadium: Nagyerdei Stadion; Attendance: 3,250; Referee: Tamás Bognár

5 October 2019 8	Diósgyőr	1–1	Puskás Akadémia	Miskolc
17:00 CEST (UTC+2)	Shestakov 77'	Report	Vlasko 90+2'	Stadium: Diósgyőri Stadion; Attendance: 2,302; Referee: József Erdős

19 October 2019 9	Puskás Akadémia	4–2	Paks	Felcsút
17:00 CEST (UTC+2)	Vaněček 21'; Urblík 27'; Gyurcsó 50', 76'	Report	Könyves 19'; Papp 59'	Stadium: Pancho Aréna; Attendance: 1,141; Referee: Ferenc Karakó

26 October 2019 10	Kisvárda	0–1	Puskás Akadémia	Kisvárda
17:00 CEST (UTC+2)		Report	Henty 79'	Stadium: Várkerti Stadion; Attendance: 2,684; Referee: Gergő Bogár

2 November 2019 11	Puskás Akadémia	1–2	Budapest Honvéd	Felcsút
14:30 CET (UTC+1)	Gyurcsó 23'	Report	Lanzafame 6'; Gazdag 72'	Stadium: Pancho Aréna; Attendance: 2,123; Referee: Péter Solymosi

9 November 2019 12	Puskás Akadémia	1–3	Újpest	Felcsút
17:00 CET (UTC+1)	Henty 34'	Report	Onovo 31'; Feczesin 45', 81'	Stadium: Pancho Aréna; Attendance: 1,725; Referee: Gergő Bogár

23 November 2019 13	Fehérvár	1–3	Puskás Akadémia	Székesfehérvár
17:00 CET (UTC+1)	Juhász 90'	Report	Vaněček 3'; Gyurcsó 27', 71'	Stadium: MOL Aréna Sóstó; Attendance: 3,365; Referee: Ferenc Karakó

30 November 2019 14	Puskás Akadémia	1–1	Mezőkövesd	Felcsút
17:00 CET (UTC+1)	Henty 6'	Report	Karnitsky 88'	Stadium: Pancho Aréna; Attendance: 1,028; Referee: Csaba Pintér

8 December 2019 15	Ferencváros	2–2	Puskás Akadémia	Budapest
15:45 CET (UTC+1)	Zubkov 7', 40'	Report	Henty 52', 77'	Stadium: Groupama Arena; Attendance: 8,127; Referee: Sándor Andó-Szabó

14 December 2019 16	Puskás Akadémia	0–1	Zalaegerszeg	Felcsút
17:00 CET (UTC+1)		Report	G. Bobál 57'	Stadium: Pancho Aréna; Attendance: 1,018; Referee: Zoltán Iványi

25 January 2020 17	Kaposvár	1–1	Puskás Akadémia	Kaposvár
17:00 CET (UTC+1)	R. Nagy 20'	Report	Mebrahtu 15'	Stadium: Rákóczi Stadion; Attendance: 1,053; Referee: József Erdős

1 February 2020 18	Puskás Akadémia	0–0	Debrecen	Felcsút
17:00 CET (UTC+1)		Report		Stadium: Pancho Aréna; Attendance: 1,018; Referee: Balázs Berke

5 February 2020 19	Puskás Akadémia	2–2	Diósgyőr	Felcsút
18:00 CET (UTC+1)	Knežević 50'; Hegedűs 90+2'	Report	Iszlai 58' (pen.); Molnár 70'	Stadium: Pancho Aréna; Attendance: 785; Referee: Ádám Farkas

8 February 2020 20	Paks	0–2	Puskás Akadémia	Paks
17:00 CET (UTC+1)		Report	Favorov 12'; Vaněček 90'	Stadium: Fehérvári úti Stadion; Attendance: 1,106; Referee: Csaba Pintér

15 February 2020 21	Puskás Akadémia	3–1	Kisvárda	Felcsút
17:00 CET (UTC+1)	Szolnoki 36'; Vaněček 66'; Urblík 75'	Report	Gosztonyi 83'	Stadium: Pancho Aréna; Attendance: 821; Referee: Gergő Bogár

22 February 2020 22	Budapest Honvéd	1–1	Puskás Akadémia	Budapest
17:00 CET (UTC+1)	Lanzafame 53' (pen.)	Report	Knežević 88' (pen.)	Stadium: Hidegkuti Nándor Stadion; Attendance: 2,283; Referee: Ferenc Karakó

29 February 2020 23	Újpest	2–3	Puskás Akadémia	Zalaegerszeg
17:00 CET (UTC+1)	Calcan 27'; Novothny 90+1'	Report	Vaněček 3'; Knežević 42' van Nieff 87'	Stadium: ZTE Arena; Attendance: 182; Referee: Péter Solymosi

7 March 2020 24	Puskás Akadémia	1–4	Fehérvár	Felcsút
17:00 CET (UTC+1)	Slagveer 24'	Report	Bamgboye 50'; Petryak 59'; Nikolić 81'; Stopira 89'	Stadium: Pancho Aréna; Attendance: 2,015; Referee: Csaba Pintér

14 March 2020 25	Mezőkövesd	0–0	Puskás Akadémia	Mezőkövesd
17:00 CET (UTC+1)		Report		Stadium: Városi Stadion; Attendance: x Referee: József Erdős

31 May 2020 26	Puskás Akadémia	1–1	Ferencváros	Felcsút
21:05 CEST (UTC+2)	Lovrencsics 31' (o.g.)	Report	Nguen 17'	Stadium: Pancho Aréna; Attendance: 600; Referee: Sándor Andó-Szabó

7 June 2020 27	Zalaegerszeg	2–0	Puskás Akadémia	Zalaegerszeg
18:55 CEST (UTC+2)	G. Bobál 47'; D. Bobál 86'	Report		Stadium: ZTE Arena; Attendance: 2,166; Referee: István Vad

10 June 2020 28	Puskás Akadémia	2–1	Kaposvár	Felcsút
19:00 CEST (UTC+2)	Knežević 8' (pen.); Tamás 90'	Report	Szakály 23'	Stadium: Pancho Aréna; Attendance: 150; Referee: Péter Solymosi

13 June 2020 29	Debrecen	2–2	Puskás Akadémia	Debrecen
19:00 CEST (UTC+2)	Adeniji 6', 63'	Report	Knežević 33' van Nieff 57'	Stadium: Nagyerdei Stadion; Attendance: 2,850; Referee: Zoltán Iványi

17 June 2020 30	Diósgyőr	1–2	Puskás Akadémia	Miskolc
19:00 CEST (UTC+2)	Ivanovski 3'	Report	Deutsch 21'; Vaněček 48'	Stadium: Diósgyőri Stadion; Attendance: 2,910; Referee: Ferenc Karakó

20 June 2020 31	Puskás Akadémia	3–1	Paks	Felcsút
19:00 CEST (UTC+2)	Vaněček 4', 89'; Knežević 43'	Report	Sajbán 55'	Stadium: Pancho Aréna; Attendance: 800; Referee: Balázs Berke

24 June 2020 32	Kisvárda	1–1	Puskás Akadémia	Kisvárda
19:00 CEST (UTC+2)	Sassá 85'	Report	Meißner 90+4'	Stadium: Várkerti Stadion; Attendance: 2,875; Referee: Csaba Pintér

27 June 2020 33	Puskás Akadémia	2–1	Budapest Honvéd	Felcsút
20:00 CEST (UTC+2)	Nagy 35'; Slagveer 84'	Report	George 23'	Stadium: Pancho Aréna; Attendance: 1,918; Referee: Zoltán Iványi

=== Magyar Kupa ===
21 September 2019 Round of 128	Bonyhád	0–5	Puskás Akadémia	Bonyhád
15:00 CEST (UTC+2)		Report	Gyurcsó 2', 37' (pen.), 40'; Tamás 87'; Mebrahtu 90+2'	Stadium: Bonyhád VLC Sporttelep; Attendance: 600; Referee: Sára Somogyi

30 October 2019 Round of 64	Maglód	0–15	Puskás Akadémia	Maglód
12:30 CET (UTC+1)		Report	van Nieff 13'; Gyurcsó 34', 46', 74', 86'; Meißner 39'; Radics 45'; Fülöp 50'; Tamás 65', 68', 78'; Kiss 69', 82', 90'; Kourdakis 75' (o.g.)	Stadium: Kertész Károly Stadion; Attendance: 600; Referee: Ákos Gaál

4 December 2019 Round of 32	Dabas-Gyón	0–3	Puskás Akadémia	Dabas
12:00 CET (UTC+1)		Report	van Nieff 18'; Meißner 45'; Vaněček 63'	Stadium: Dabas-Gyón Sporttelep; Attendance: 300; Referee: Tibor Horváth

=== Round of 16 ===
12 February 2020 First leg	Békéscsaba	0–3	Puskás Akadémia	Békéscsaba
18:00 CET (UTC+1)		Report	Vaněček 22', 78'; Slagveer 35'	Stadium: Kórház utcai Stadion; Attendance: 825; Referee: Sándor Szilágyi

19 February 2020 Second leg	Puskás Akadémia	3–0 (6–0 agg.)	Békéscsaba	Felcsút
18:00 CET (UTC+1)	Slagveer 1'; Tamás 66'; Komáromi 76'	Report		Stadium: Pancho Aréna; Attendance: 613; Referee: Tamás Móri
Note: Puskás Akadémia won 6-0 on aggregate.

=== Quarter-finals ===
3 March 2020 First leg	Puskás Akadémia	0–1	Mezőkövesd	Felcsút
18:50 CET (UTC+1)		Report	Zivzivadze 47'	Stadium: Pancho Aréna; Attendance: 742; Referee: Tamás Bognár

11 March 2020 Second leg	Mezőkövesd	1–1 (2–1 agg.)	Puskás Akadémia	Mezőkövesd
18:00 CET (UTC+1)	Pillár 89'	Report	Gyurcsó 47'	Stadium: Mezőkövesdi Városi Stadion; Attendance: 939; Referee: Sándor Andó-Szabó
Note: Mezőkövesd won 2-1 on aggregate.

== Statistics ==
=== Appearances and goals ===
Last updated on 27 June 2020.

No.	Pos	Nat	Player	Total		Nemzeti Bajnokság I		Magyar Kupa	
No.	Pos	Nat	Player	Apps	Goals	Apps	Goals	Apps	Goals
1	GK	(Hungary) HUN	Balázs Tóth	13	-10	9	-10	4	0
5	DF	(Germany) GER	Thomas Meißner	37	3	32	1	5	2
6	MF	(Netherlands) NED	Yoell van Nieff	33	4	28	2	5	2
7	FW	(Australia) AUS	Golgol Mebrahtu	23	2	17	1	6	1
8	MF	(Slovakia) SVK	Jozef Urblík	25	4	23	4	2	0
9	FW	(Hungary) HUN	Bence Sós	32	1	28	1	4	0
11	FW	(Netherlands) NED	Luciano Slagveer	20	4	16	2	4	2
11	MF	(Slovakia) SVK	Ján Vlasko	4	1	3	1	1	0
14	MF	(Ukraine) UKR	Artem Favorov	12	1	10	1	2	0
15	MF	(Czech Republic) CZE	Jakub Plšek	19	0	15	0	4	0
17	FW	(Czech Republic) CZE	David Vaněček	36	14	32	11	4	3
18	DF	(Hungary) HUN	András Huszti	6	0	2	0	4	0
19	GK	(Hungary) HUN	Lajos Hegedűs	28	-33	25	-31	3	-2
20	MF	(Hungary) HUN	Márton Radics	19	1	13	0	6	1
22	DF	(Hungary) HUN	Roland Szolnoki	31	1	27	1	4	0
23	DF	(Hungary) HUN	Csaba Spandler	22	0	18	0	4	0
25	MF	(Hungary) HUN	Zsolt Nagy	28	1	25	1	3	0
26	DF	(Bulgaria) BUL	Kamen Hadzhiev	31	0	28	0	3	0
29	FW	(Romania) ROU	Nándor Tamás	10	6	7	1	3	5
30	MF	(Croatia) CRO	Josip Knežević	33	8	30	8	3	0
33	MF	(Hungary) HUN	József Varga	6	0	4	0	2	0
68	DF	(Hungary) HUN	János Hegedűs	1	0	0	0	1	0
77	FW	(Hungary) HUN	Ádám Gyurcsó	35	15	29	7	6	8
99	DF	(Hungary) HUN	László Deutsch	13	1	11	1	2	0
Youth players:
51	MF	(Hungary) HUN	Noel László	1	0	0	0	1	0
52	MF	(Hungary) HUN	Zsolt Magyar	1	0	0	0	1	0
74	GK	(Hungary) HUN	Martin Auerbach	1	0	0	0	1	0
80	MF	(Hungary) HUN	Botond Nándori	1	0	0	0	1	0
97	FW	(Hungary) HUN	György Komáromi	2	1	0	0	2	1
Out to loan:
21	MF	(Hungary) HUN	Tamás Kiss	13	3	10	0	3	3
27	FW	(Hungary) HUN	Alen Skribek	1	0	0	0	1	0
80	MF	(Romania) ROU	Lóránd Fülöp	4	1	1	0	3	1
Players no longer at the club:
10	FW	(Nigeria) NGR	Ezekiel Henty	13	7	12	7	1	0

=== Top scorers ===
Includes all competitive matches. The list is sorted by shirt number when total goals are equal.

Last updated on 27 June 2020

Position	Nation	Number	Name	Nemzeti Bajnokság I	Magyar Kupa	Total
1	(Hungary)	77	Ádám Gyurcsó	7	8	15
2	(Czech Republic)	17	David Vaněček	11	3	14
3	(Croatia)	30	Josip Knežević	8	0	8
4	(Nigeria)	10	Ezekiel Henty	7	0	7
5	(Romania)	29	Nándor Tamás	1	5	6
6	(Slovakia)	8	Jozef Urblík	4	0	4
7	(Netherlands)	6	Yoell van Nieff	2	2	4
8	(Netherlands)	11	Luciano Slagveer	2	2	4
9	(Germany)	5	Thomas Meißner	1	2	3
10	(Hungary)	21	Tamás Kiss	0	3	3
11	(Australia)	7	Golgol Mebrahtu	1	1	2
12	(Hungary)	9	Bence Sós	1	0	1
13	(Slovakia)	11	Ján Vlasko	1	0	1
14	(Hungary)	19	Lajos Hegedűs	1	0	1
15	(Ukraine)	14	Artem Favorov	1	0	1
16	(Hungary)	22	Roland Szolnoki	1	0	1
17	(Hungary)	99	László Deutsch	1	0	1
18	(Hungary)	25	Zsolt Nagy	1	0	1
19	(Hungary)	20	Márton Radics	0	1	1
20	(Romania)	80	Lóránd Fülöp	0	1	1
21	(Hungary)	97	György Komáromi	0	1	1
/	/	/	Own Goals	1	1	2
			TOTALS	52	30	82

=== Disciplinary record ===
Includes all competitive matches. Players with 1 card or more included only.

Last updated on 27 June 2020

Position	Nation	Number	Name	Nemzeti Bajnokság I		Magyar Kupa		Total (Hu Total)	
Position	Nation	Number	Name	Yellow card	Red card	Yellow card	Red card	Yellow card	Red card
DF	(Germany)	5	Thomas Meißner	4	0	2	0	6 (4)	0 (0)
MF	(Netherlands)	6	Yoell van Nieff	8	2	2	0	10 (8)	2 (2)
FW	(Australia)	7	Golgol Mebrahtu	1	0	1	0	2 (1)	0 (0)
MF	(Slovakia)	8	Jozef Urblík	6	0	0	0	6 (6)	0 (0)
FW	(Hungary)	9	Bence Sós	4	0	0	0	4 (4)	0 (0)
FW	(Nigeria)	10	Ezekiel Henty	4	0	0	0	4 (4)	0 (0)
FW	(Netherlands)	11	Luciano Slagveer	2	0	0	0	2 (2)	0 (0)
MF	(Czech Republic)	15	Jakub Plšek	1	0	1	0	2 (1)	0 (0)
FW	(Czech Republic)	17	David Vaněček	5	0	0	0	5 (5)	0 (0)
GK	(Hungary)	19	Lajos Hegedűs	1	0	0	0	1 (1)	0 (0)
MF	(Hungary)	20	Márton Radics	2	0	3	0	5 (2)	0 (0)
FW	(Hungary)	21	Tamás Kiss	1	0	0	0	1 (1)	0 (0)
DF	(Hungary)	22	Roland Szolnoki	10	2	2	0	12 (10)	2 (2)
DF	(Hungary)	23	Csaba Spandler	5	0	0	0	5 (5)	0 (0)
MF	(Hungary)	25	Zsolt Nagy	7	0	0	0	7 (7)	0 (0)
DF	(Bulgaria)	26	Kamen Hadzhiev	6	2	2	0	8 (6)	2 (2)
MF	(Croatia)	30	Josip Knežević	13	0	0	0	13 (13)	0 (0)
MF	(Hungary)	33	József Varga	1	0	1	0	2 (1)	0 (0)
DF	(Hungary)	68	János Hegedűs	0	0	1	0	1 (0)	0 (0)
FW	(Hungary)	77	Ádám Gyurcsó	2	0	1	0	3 (2)	0 (0)
MF	(Romania)	80	Lóránd Fülöp	0	0	1	0	1 (0)	0 (0)
DF	(Hungary)	99	László Deutsch	2	0	0	0	2 (2)	0 (0)
			TOTALS	85	6	17	0	102 (85)	6 (6)

=== Overall ===
Games played	40 (33 Nemzeti Bajnokság I and 7 Magyar Kupa)
Games won	19 (14 Nemzeti Bajnokság I and 5 Magyar Kupa)
Games drawn	13 (12 Nemzeti Bajnokság I and 1 Magyar Kupa)
Games lost	8 (7 Nemzeti Bajnokság I and 1 Magyar Kupa)
Goals scored	82
Goals conceded	43
Goal difference	+39
Yellow cards	102
Red cards	6
Worst discipline	(Hungary) Roland Szolnoki (12 (yellow card) , 2 (red card) )
Best result	15–0 (A) v Maglód - Magyar Kupa - 30-10-2019
Worst result	1–4 (H) v Fehérvár - Nemzeti Bajnokság I - 07-03-2020
Most appearances	(Germany) Thomas Meißner (37 appearances)
Top scorer	(Hungary) Ádám Gyurcsó (15 goals)
Points	70/120 (58.33%)

Last updated: 27 June 2020
