= 2018 Magyar Kupa final =

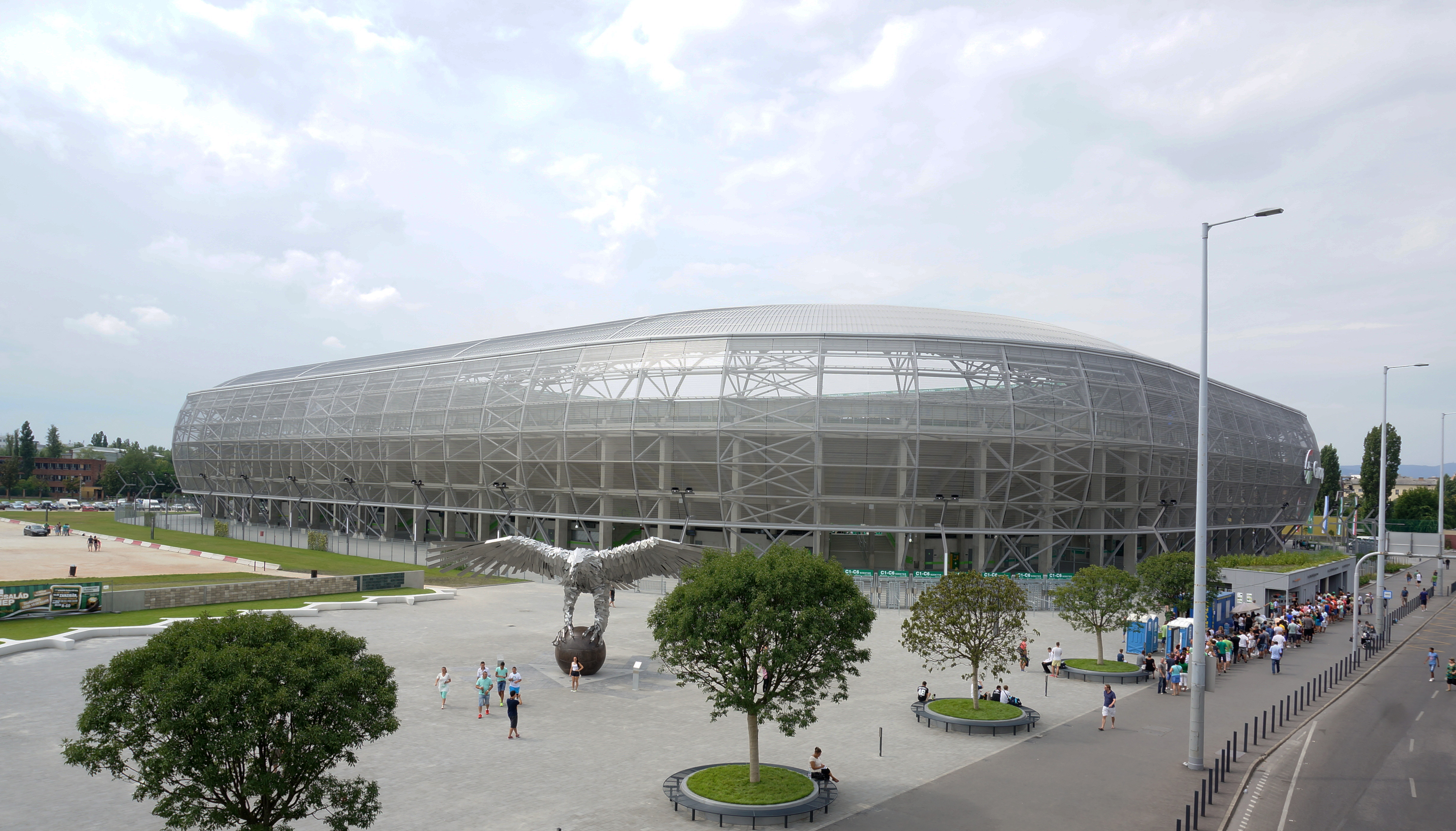
- Groupama Arena hosted the final
- Event: 2017–18 Magyar Kupa
Puskás Akadémia	Újpest
2	2
- After extra time Újpest won 5–4 on penalties
- Date: 23 May 2018
- Venue: Groupama Arena, Budapest
- Referee: Sándor Andó-Szabó
- Attendance: 11,270

The 2018 Magyar Kupa final was the final match of the 2017–18 Magyar Kupa, played between Puskás Akadémia and Újpest on 23 May 2018 at the Groupama Arena in Budapest, Hungary.

== Teams ==
Team	Previous finals appearances (bold indicates winners)
Puskás Akadémia	None
Újpest	16 (1922, 1923, 1925, 1927, 1933, **1969**, **1970**, **1975**, **1982**, **1983**, **1987**, **1992**, 1998, **2002**, **2014**, 2016)

== Route to the final ==
Puskás Akadémia			Round	Újpest
Opponent	Result	Legs		Opponent	Result	Legs
Kaposvár (NB III)	3–1		Round of 128	Öttevény (county II)	6–0
Eger (MB I)	6–0		Round of 64	Gödöllő (county I)	3–0
Kisvárda (NB II)	1–0		Round of 32	Vecsés (NB III)	5–0
Zalaegerszeg (NB II)	2–1	0–1 away; 2–0 home	Round of 16	Paks (NB I)	4–0	2–0 home; 2–0 away
Diósgyőr (NB I)	3–1	0–1 away; 3–0 home	Quarterfinals	MTK Budapest (NB II)	4–4	2–1 home; 2–3 away
Debrecen (NB I)	4–2	4–0 home; 0–2 away	Semifinals	Balmazújváros (NB I)	2–1	2–1 home; 0–0 away

== Match ==
23 May 2018
20:00 CEST

Puskás Akadémia	2–2 (a.e.t.)	Újpest
Knežević 38'; Perošević 66'	Report	Zsótér 55'; Bojović 63'
Penalties
Perošević (penalty scored); Bačelić-Grgić (penalty scored); Diallo (penalty scored); Henty (penalty missed); Balogh (penalty scored); J. Hegedűs (penalty missed)	4–5	(penalty scored) Onovo; (penalty scored) Litauszki; (penalty scored) Diallo; (penalty missed) Balázs; (penalty scored) Zsótér; (penalty scored) Bojović

Groupama Arena, Budapest
Attendance: 11,270
Referee: Sándor Andó-Szabó

**Puskás Akadémia**	**Újpest**

GK	(Hungary) Lajos Hegedűs (yellow card) 113'
RB	(Hungary) János Hegedűs (yellow card) 109'
DF	(Hungary) Patrik Poór
DF	(Hungary) Csaba Spandler
LB	(Slovenia) Dejan Trajkovski
MF	(Hungary) Péter Szakály (substituted off) 112'
MF	(Croatia) Josip Knežević (substituted off) 87'
MF	(Hungary) Balázs Balogh
MF	(Hungary) Dávid Márkvárt (yellow card) 60' (substituted off) 117'
FW	(Croatia) Antonio Perošević
FW	(Nigeria) Ezekiel Henty
Substitutes:
GK	(Serbia) Branislav Danilović
DF	(Slovenia) Denis Klinar
MF	(Croatia) Stipe Bačelić-Grgić (substituted on) 112'
MF	(Hungary) András Radó
MF	(Belgium) Jonathan Heris
FW	(Mali) Ulysse Diallo (substituted on) 87'
FW	(Hungary) Gábor Molnár (substituted on) 112'
Manager:
(Hungary) Attila Pintér

GK	(Serbia) Filip Pajović
RB	(Serbia) Branko Pauljević (yellow card) 113'
DF	(Montenegro) Mijuško Bojović
DF	(Hungary) Róbert Litauszki
LB	(Bosnia and Herzegovina) Dženan Bureković (substituted off) 91'
MF	(Hungary) Benjamin Balázs
MF	(Montenegro) Bojan Sanković
MF	(Nigeria) Vincent Onovo
MF	(Nigeria) Obinna Nwobodo (yellow card) 105'
FW	(Hungary) Soma Novothny (substituted off) 108'
FW	(Hungary) Donát Zsótér (yellow card) 88'
Substitutes:
GK	(Hungary) Bence Gundel-Takács
DF	(Hungary) Dávid Kálnoki-Kis
DF	(Hungary) Kristóf Szűcs
MF	(Mali) Alassane Diallo (substituted on) 91'
MF	(Hungary) Benjámin Cseke
MF	(Hungary) Bence Pávkovics
FW	(Hungary) Patrik Tischler (substituted on) 108'
Manager:
(Serbia) Nebojša Vignjević
