= Bryan de Jesús =

Ecuadorian football player (born 1995)

Personal information
- Full name: Bryan Alejandro de Jesús Pabón
- Date of birth: 10 February 1995 (age 31)
- Place of birth: Ibarra, Ecuador
- Height: 1.85 m (6 ft 1 in)
- Position: Forward

Team information
- Current team: El Nacional
- Number: 9

Youth career
- 2012–2014: El Nacional
- 2014–2016: Católica

Senior career*
Years	Team	Apps	(Gls)
2016–2018	El Nacional	46	(16)
2017	→ Necaxa (loan)	1	(0)
2018	→ Puskás Akadémia (loan)	3	(1)
2019	→ Guayaquil City (loan)	6	(0)
2019–2020	→ Mushuc Runa (loan)	6	(2)
2020	Universidad Católica	10	(0)
2021	→ C.D. Olmedo (loan)	3	(0)
- * Club domestic league appearances and goals as of 15 May 2021

Bryan Alejandro de Jesús Pabón (born 10 February 1995) is an Ecuadorian professional footballer who plays for El Nacional. Bryan de Jesús is the brother of Marlon de Jesús who plays for C.S. Emelec.

== Club statistics ==
Club	Season	League		Cup		Continental		Total
Club	Season	Apps	Goals	Apps	Goals	Apps	Goals	Apps	Goals
Universidad Católica	2015	1	0	-	-	0	0	1	0
Universidad Católica	Total	1	0	-	-	0	0	1	0
El Nacional	2016	8	1	-	-	-	-	8	1
El Nacional	2017	36	15	-	-	2	1	38	16
El Nacional	Total	44	16	-	-	2	1	46	17
Necaxa	2018	1	0	2	1	-	-	3	1
Necaxa	Total	1	0	2	1	-	-	3	1
El Nacional	2018	2	1	-	-	-	-	2	1
El Nacional	Total	2	1	-	-	-	-	2	1
Puskás Akadémia	2018-19	4	1	-	-	-	-	4	1
Puskás Akadémia	Total	4	1	-	-	-	-	4	1
Guayaquil City	2019	6	0	0	0	-	-	6	0
Guayaquil City	Total	6	0	0	0	-	-	6	0
Mushuc Runa	2019	6	2	0	0	0	0	6	2
Mushuc Runa	Total	6	2	0	0	0	0	6	2
Universidad Católica	2020	10	0	0	0	1	0	11	0
Universidad Católica	Total	10	0	0	0	1	0	11	0
C.D. Olmedo	2021	3	0	-	-	-	-	3	0
C.D. Olmedo	Total	3	0	-	-	-	-	3	0
Liga Deportiva Universitaria	2022	3	1	0	0	2	0	5	1
Liga Deportiva Universitaria	Total	3	1	0	0	2	0	5	1
Imbabura S.C.	2022	3	0	0	0	—		3	0
Imbabura S.C.	Total	3	0	0	0	0	0	3	0
Career Total		83	21	2	1	5	1	90	23

Updated to games played as of 8 September 2022.

== Honours ==
Necaxa

- Copa MX: Clausura 2018
