= Jozef Urblík =

Slovak footballer

Personal information
- Date of birth: 22 August 1996 (age 30)
- Place of birth: Bardejov, Slovakia
- Height: 1.84 m (6 ft 0 in)
- Position: Attacking midfielder

Team information
- Current team: Vasas
- Number: 88

Youth career
- 2013–2014: Nitra

Senior career*
Years	Team	Apps	(Gls)
2014–2016	Nitra	41	(8)
2016–2018	Jihlava	43	(6)
2018–2023	Puskás Akadémia	87	(7)
2023–	Vasas	99	(24)

International career^{‡}
2012	Slovakia U-17	1	(0)
2017	Slovakia U-21	4	(0)
2026–	Hungary	1	(0)
- * Club domestic league appearances and goals as of 31 May 2026 ‡ National team caps and goals as of 18 November 2026

Jozef Urblík (born 22 August 1996) is a football midfielder who plays for the Nemzeti Bajnokság I club Vasas. Born in Slovakia, he represents the Hungary national team.

His father, also named Jozef Urblík, was also a professional footballer.

== Career ==
=== Nitra ===
He made his Slovak Super Liga debut for Nitra, against Dukla Banská Bystrica on 23 November 2013, entering in as a substitute in place of René Kotrík.

=== Vasas ===
On 21 February 2023, Urblík signed a two-and-a-half-year contract with Vasas.

== International career ==
Urblík was born in Slovakia, and a former youth international for them up to the Slovakia U-21s. He gained Hungarian nationality in 2023. In November 2026, he was called up to the Hungary national football team.

== Career statistics ==
=== Club ===
As of 22 February 2026

Appearances and goals by club, season and competition
Club	Season	League		Cup		Europe		Total	
Club	Season	Apps	Goals	Apps	Goals	Apps	Goals	Apps	Goals
Nitra	2013–14	2	0	—		—		2	0
Nitra	2014–15	30	6	3	0	—		33	6
Nitra	2015–16	9	2	2	0	—		11	2
Nitra	Total	41	8	5	0	—		46	8
Jihlava	2016–17	15	1	2	1	—		17	2
Jihlava	2017–18	22	1	2	0	—		24	1
Jihlava	2018–19	6	4	1	0	—		7	4
Jihlava	Total	43	6	5	1	—		48	7
Puskás Akadémia	2018–19	19	1	5	0	—		24	1
Puskás Akadémia	2019–20	23	4	2	0	—		25	4
Puskás Akadémia	2020–21	22	1	2	0	—		24	1
Puskás Akadémia	2021–22	15	1	—		—		15	1
Puskás Akadémia	2022–23	8	0	2	0	2	0	12	0
Puskás Akadémia	Total	87	7	11	0	2	0	100	7
Vasas	2022–23	11	3	2	0	—		13	3
Vasas	2023–24	30	2	4	0	—		34	2
Vasas	2024–25	29	6	1	1	—		30	7
Vasas	2025–26	19	5	3	1	—		22	6
Vasas	Total	89	16	10	2	—		99	18
Career Total		260	37	31	3	2	0	293	40

=== International ===
As of match played 17 November 2026

Appearances and goals by national team and year
National team	Year	Apps	Goals
Hungary	2026	1	0
Total		1	0
