= Benedik Mioč =

Croatian footballer

Personal information
- Full name: Benedik Mioč
- Date of birth: 6 October 1994 (age 32)
- Place of birth: Osijek, Croatia
- Height: 1.71 m (5 ft 7 1/2 in)
- Position: Midfielder

Team information
- Current team: Polonia Bytom
- Number: 5

Youth career
- 2003–2013: Osijek

Senior career*
Years	Team	Apps	(Gls)
2013–2020	Osijek	85	(3)
2013	→ Segesta (loan)	4	(0)
2014	→ Višnjevac (loan)	14	(4)
2015	→ Belišće (loan)	15	(6)
2015	→ Višnjevac (loan)	15	(10)
2018–2019	→ Puskás Akadémia (loan)	22	(0)
2020	Sheriff Tiraspol	11	(0)
2021–2022	Hrvatski Dragovoljac	17	(2)
2022	Saburtalo	16	(2)
2022–2024	Slaven Belupo	55	(10)
2024–2026	Miedź Legnica	56	(6)
2026–	Polonia Bytom	0	(0)

International career
2013	Croatia U19	1	(0)
- * Club domestic league appearances and goals as of 15:00, 29 May 2026 (UTC)

Benedik Mioč (born 6 October 1994) is a Croatian professional footballer who plays as a midfielder for I liga club Polonia Bytom.

== Club career ==
Mioč started his career with the youth team of Osijek and captained the juvenile team. To get first team opportunities, he was loaned out to second-tier club Segesta in 2013 along with a host of other players. Among the appearances he made, he featured for the club in a 2–0 defeat against Zadar in Croatian Football Cup which saw the club eliminated from the cup.

In February 2014, Mioč was loaned out to Višnjevac which played in 3. HNL, the third tier of Croatian football. He was loaned out another time in January 2015, this time to Belišće.

Mioč made his league debut for the club on 1 March 2016 in a draw against Hajduk Split. Coming as a 71st-minute substitute for Zoran Lesjak, he managed to beat Hajduk goalie Lovre Kalinic in the last attack of the match. His contract was extended to 2020 in January 2017. In June of the same year, he scored a goal in a 2–0 victory over Andorran club Santa Coloma in the UEFA Europa League.

On 29 August 2018, Mioč joined Hungarian club Puskás Akadémia on a year-long loan deal.
