= Patrick Mevoungou =

Cameroonian footballer

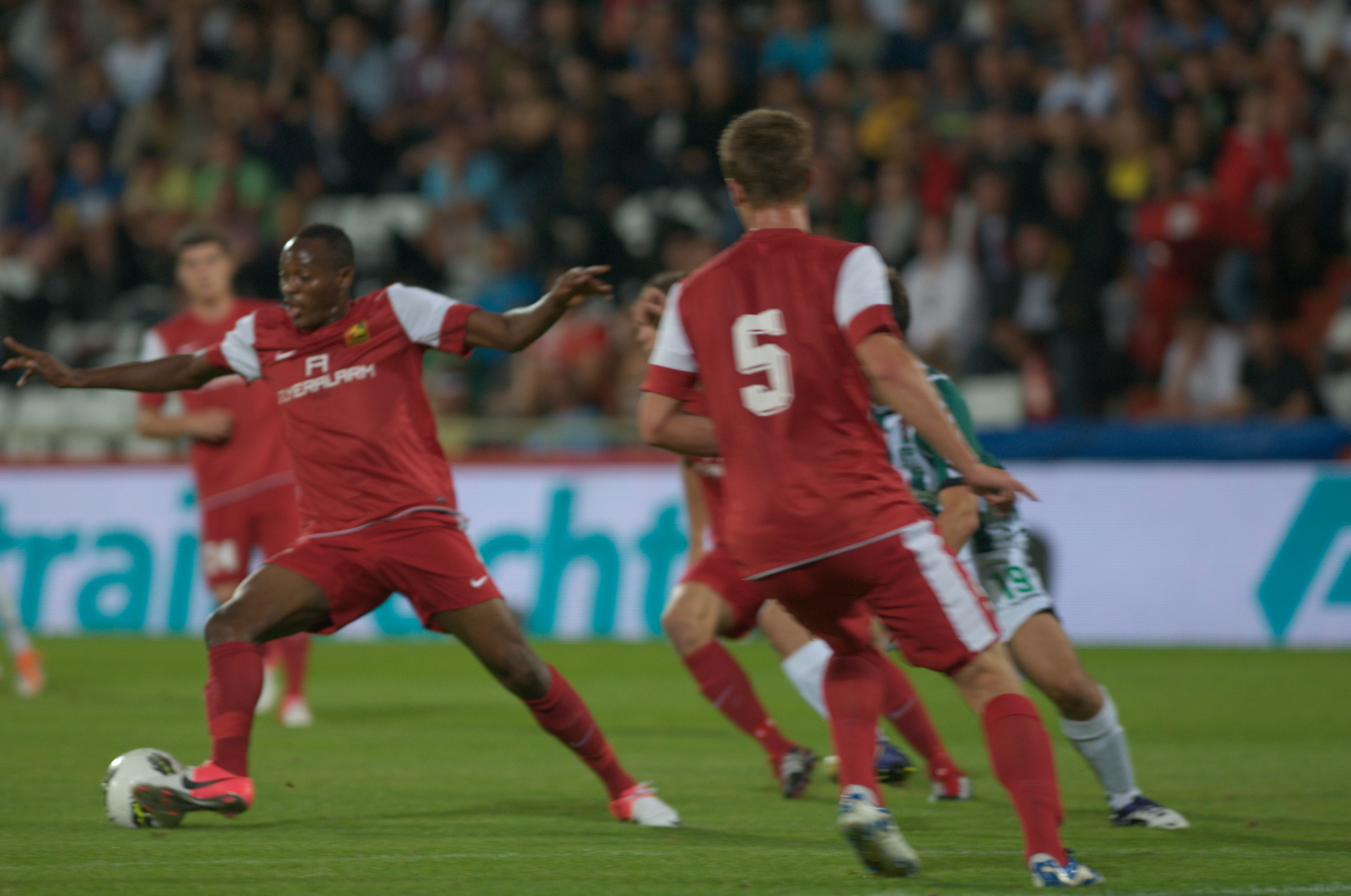
- Mevoungou in 2012

Personal information
- Full name: Patrick Mevoungou Mekoulou
- Date of birth: February 15, 1986 (age 40)
- Place of birth: Yaoundé, Cameroon
- Height: 1.80 m (5 ft 11 in)
- Position: Midfielder

Senior career*
Years	Team	Apps	(Gls)
2004–2005	Espoir Ebowola		
2005–2006	Union Douala		
2006–2007	Renova		
2007–2008	Dalian Shide		
2008–2011	Canon Yaoundé	39	(11)
2010–2011	→ Sturm Graz (loan)	12	(0)
2011–2013	Admira Wacker	28	(0)
2013–2014	Győri ETO	17	(0)
2016	Al Ahly SC		
2016	Canon Yaounde	2	(1)
2016–2017	Mezőkövesd-Zsóry	12	(0)
2017	Diósgyőr	9	(0)
2017–2018	Puskás Akadémia	24	(0)
2018	Mezőkövesd	13	(0)
2019–2020	Kisvárda	0	(0)
2020	Al-Tai		

International career^{‡}
2010–	Cameroon	2	(0)
- * Club domestic league appearances and goals as of 00:29, 7 June 2019 (UTC) ‡ National team caps and goals as of 21 July 2013

Patrick Mevoungou (born 15 February 1986) is a Cameroonian football midfielder. He made two appearances for the Cameroon national team.

== Career ==
Born in Yaoundé, Mevoungou began his career with Espoir Ebowola. Between 2005 and 2006 he played for Cameroonian top league club Union Douala.

In 2006, he emigrated to Macedonia where he played one season with FK Renova before moving to China, to play the 2008 season with Dalian Haichang. After this first experience abroad, he returned to Cameroon and signed with Canon Yaoundé where he played two seasons. It was then, that he decided to emigrate again, this to play on loan with Austrian Bundesliga club SK Sturm Graz.

Mevongou played for the Cameroon national team and he was part of the wider list of players pre-selected to participate in the 2010 FIFA World Cup.
