= Ulysse Diallo =

Malian footballer (born 1992)

Personal information
- Full name: Ulysse Diallo
- Date of birth: 26 October 1992 (age 34)
- Place of birth: Bamako, Mali
- Height: 1.82 m (6 ft 0 in)
- Position: Forward

Senior career*
Years	Team	Apps	(Gls)
2011–2013	Shabab Sahel	41	(28)
2013–2014	Ferencváros	18	(4)
2014	Arouca	4	(1)
2015	Académica	5	(0)
2015–2016	Marítimo	6	(0)
2016–2017	Mezőkövesd	15	(4)
2017–2018	Puskás Akadémia	30	(8)
2019	MTK Budapest	10	(1)
2019–2020	Sabah	15	(3)
2021	Mezőkövesd	3	(0)
2022–2023	FK Panevėžys	15	(3)
2022–2023	Rahmatganj MFS	7	(2)
- * Club domestic league appearances and goals as of 22 July 2023

Ulysse Diallo (born 26 October 1992) is a Malian professional footballer who last played for Bangladesh Premier League club Rahmatganj MFS.

== Club career ==
Diallo was born in Bamako, Mali.

After impressing for Ferencvárosi TC during a five-week trial, Diallo signed with them on 24 July 2013. After one season with Ferencváros, Diallo had his contract terminated by mutual consent at the beginning of June 2013, going on to sign a two-year contract with F.C. Arouca later in the same month.

In January 2015, Diallo joined Azerbaijan Premier League team Gabala FK on trial.

On 2 February 2015, Diallo signed a six-month-deal with Académica. In late June, Diallo went on trial with Russian Football National League side FC Tosno appearing and scoring on a friendly against Spartak Moscow II.

On 3 July 2015, Diallo signed a three-year deal with Marítimo.

On 2 August 2019, Diallo signed a two-year contract with Azerbaijan Premier League side Sabah FC.

== Club statistics ==
As of match played 7 November 2014

Club	Season	League		Cup		League Cup		Europe		Total	
Club	Season	Apps	Goals	Apps	Goals	Apps	Goals	Apps	Goals	Apps	Goals
Shabab Sahel	2011–12	20	10	0	0	0	0	0	0	20	10
Shabab Sahel	2012–13	21	18	0	0	0	0	0	0	21	18
Shabab Sahel	Total	41	28	0	0	0	0	0	0	41	28
Ferencváros	2013–14	18	4	2	0	8	6	0	0	28	10
Arouca	2014–15	4	1	0	0	0	0	0	0	4	1
Career total		63	33	2	0	8	6	0	0	73	39

== Honours ==
Individual

- Lebanese Premier League Team of the Season: 2012–13
