= Denis Klinar =

Slovenian footballer (born 1992)

Personal information
- Date of birth: 21 February 1992 (age 34)
- Place of birth: Slovenia
- Height: 1.85 m (6 ft 1 in)
- Position: Right-back

Team information
- Current team: Fužinar

Youth career
- –2005: Šmartno ob Paki
- 2006–2009: Celje
- 2009–2011: Rudar Velenje

Senior career*
Years	Team	Apps	(Gls)
2008	Šmartno 1928	13	(3)
2011–2015	Rudar Velenje	115	(8)
2011	→ Šmartno 1928 (loan)	1	(0)
2015–2018	Olimpija Ljubljana	50	(1)
2018	Puskás Akadémia	7	(0)
2018–2021	Maribor	62	(1)
2021	Cultural Leonesa	6	(0)
2022–2023	Gorica	4	(0)
2023	Fužinar	14	(1)
2023	Saturday Football International		
2024	SV Frauental	10	(1)
2024–2025	SV Übelbach	17	(2)
2025–	Fužinar	0	(0)

International career
2010	Slovenia U19	1	(0)
2011–2013	Slovenia U20	4	(0)
2013–2014	Slovenia U21	4	(0)
2017–2019	Slovenia B	2	(0)
- * Club domestic league appearances and goals as of 2 July 2025

Denis Klinar (born 21 February 1992) is a Slovenian footballer who plays as a right-back for Fužinar.

== Honours ==
Olimpija Ljubljana

- Slovenian First League: 2015–16

Maribor

- Slovenian First League: 2018–19
