= Stipe Bačelić-Grgić =

Croatian footballer

Personal information
- Date of birth: 16 February 1988 (age 38)
- Place of birth: Šibenik, SFR Yugoslavia
- Height: 1.87 m (6 ft 1 1/2 in)
- Position: Midfielder

Youth career
- 1997–2003: Šibenik
- 2003–2006: Hajduk Split

Senior career*
Years	Team	Apps	(Gls)
2006–2009	Hajduk Split	2	(0)
2007	→ Šibenik (loan)	0	(0)
2007–2008	→ Trogir (loan)	12	(0)
2008–2009	→ Međimurje (loan)	25	(4)
2009–2011	Šibenik	61	(11)
2012–2013	Istra 1961	38	(9)
2013–2014	Hrvatski Dragovoljac	24	(10)
2014–2015	Cercle Brugge	24	(1)
2015–2018	Puskás Akadémia	43	(2)
2016–2017	→ Mezőkövesdi SE (loan)	28	(9)
2018–2021	Slaven Belupo	57	(8)
2021–2022	Šibenik	18	(2)
2022–2023	Croatia Zmijavci	19	(4)
2023–2024	Šibenik	15	(2)

International career
2003–2004	Croatia U16	5	(2)
2005	Croatia U17	17	(6)
2006	Croatia U19	3	(2)
- * Club domestic league appearances and goals

Stipe Bačelić-Grgić (born 16 February 1988) is a Croatian former professional footballer who played as a midfielder.

== Club career ==
A product of HNK Hajduk Split youth academy, Bačelić-Grgić was promoted to the squad in July 2006, but failed to break into the first team and earn any appearances the following season. He spent the next three years on loans spells at HNK Šibenik, HNK Trogir and NK Međimurje. Upon the end of his last loan at Međimurje he was released by Hajduk in June 2009 and joined his hometown club Šibenik the following month on a free transfer. In December 2011, he terminated his contract with Šibenik through arbitration. In January 2012, Bačelić-Grgić signed a two-and-a-half-year contract with Istra 1961.

== International career ==
Bačelić-Grgić was also capped a total of 25 times and scored 10 goals for Croatia's U-16, U-17 and U-19 teams between 2003 and 2006, and was a regular member of the squad which won fourth place at the 2005 European Under-17 Championship.
