= Gonzalo Vega (footballer) =

Uruguayan footballer (born 1992)

Personal information
- Full name: Diego Gonzalo Vega Martínez
- Date of birth: 29 June 1992 (age 34)
- Place of birth: Montevideo, Uruguay
- Height: 1.73 m (5 ft 8 in)
- Position: Midfielder

Team information
- Current team: Fénix
- Number: 10

Youth career
- –2013: Nacional

Senior career*
Years	Team	Apps	(Gls)
2012	Nacional	2	(0)
2013–2014	→ Fénix (loan)	8	(1)
2014–2015	→ Rampla Juniors (loan)	20	(2)
2015–2016	Sud América	35	(6)
2017	River Plate	26	(3)
2018–2019	Puskás Akadémia	10	(0)
2019–2021	Rentistas	49	(16)
2021–2022	Nacional	7	(1)
2021–2022	→ Fénix (loan)	43	(6)
2023	Fénix	26	(3)
2024	Montevideo Wanderers	29	(2)
2025–	Fénix	6	(0)
- * Club domestic league appearances and goals as of 28 April 2025

Diego Gonzalo Vega Martínez (born 29 June 1992) is a Uruguayan footballer who plays as a midfielder for Fénix.

== Career ==
Vega grew up in the Nacional youth system. On 29 April 2012, he made his professional debut on a 0-1 away win against El Tanque Sisley, subsitituing Maximiliano Calzada in the 82 minute. He was never able to be part of the first eleven and therefore was sent on loan to Centro Atlético Fénix.

In mid 2014, he went on loan for a season to Rampla Juniors to play more matches.

In mid 2015, he was transferred to Sud América where he played 35 matches and scored 6 goals.

In January 2018, he was signed a three-year deal with Puskás Akadémia FC of the Nemzeti Bajnokság I.
