= Csaba Spandler =

Hungarian footballer

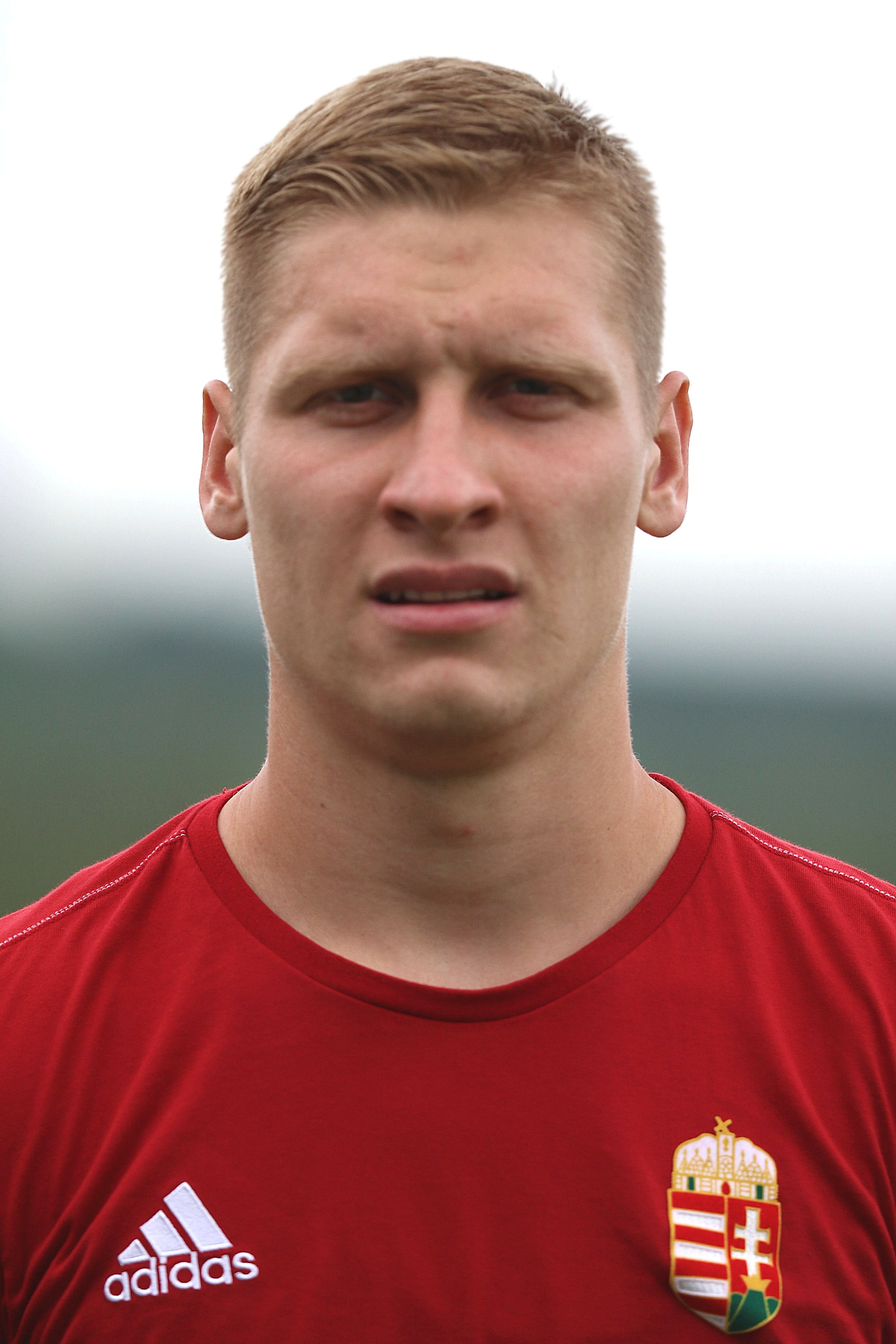
- Spandler in June 2017

Personal information
- Full name: Csaba Spandler
- Date of birth: 7 March 1996 (age 30)
- Place of birth: Mór, Hungary
- Height: 1.83 m (6 ft 0 in)
- Position: Defender

Team information
- Current team: Fehérvár
- Number: 4

Youth career
- 2005–2013: Videoton

Senior career*
Years	Team	Apps	(Gls)
2013–2023	Puskás Akadémia	171	(5)
2016	→ Csákvár (loan)	14	(0)
2023–	Fehérvár	84	(1)

International career^{‡}
2013–2014	Hungary U-17	8	(0)
2014	Hungary U-18	5	(1)
2014	Hungary U-19	3	(0)
2017	Hungary U-20	1	(0)
2017–2018	Hungary U-21	7	(0)
- * Club domestic league appearances and goals as of 31 May 2026 ‡ National team caps and goals as of 16 October 2018

Csaba Spandler (born 7 March 1996) is a Hungarian professional footballer who plays as a defender for Fehérvár.

== International career ==
Spandler was called up by the senior Hungary team for the Nations League matches against England (home), Italy (away), Germany (home) and England (away) on 4, 7, 11 and 14 June 2022 respectively.

== Career statistics ==
Appearances and goals by club, season and competition
Club	Season	League			Cup		League Cup		Europe		Total	
Club	Season	Division	Apps	Goals	Apps	Goals	Apps	Goals	Apps	Goals	Apps	Goals
Puskás	2013–14	Nemzeti Bajnokság I	0	0	0	0	6	0	—		6	0
Puskás	2014–15	Nemzeti Bajnokság I	14	0	1	0	—		—		15	0
Puskás	2016–17	Nemzeti Bajnokság II	29	1	1	0	—		—		30	1
Puskás	2017–18	Nemzeti Bajnokság I	22	1	10	0	—		—		32	1
Puskás	2018–19	Nemzeti Bajnokság I	12	0	2	0	—		—		14	0
Puskás	2019–20	Nemzeti Bajnokság I	18	0	4	0	—		—		22	0
Puskás	2020–21	Nemzeti Bajnokság I	25	1	4	0	—		1	0	30	1
Puskás	Total		120	3	22	0	6	0	1	0	149	3
Csákvár (loan)	2015–16	Nemzeti Bajnokság I	14	0	0	0	—		—		14	0
Career Total			134	3	22	0	6	0	1	0	163	3

Updated to games played as of 15 May 2021.
