= Branislav Danilović =

Serbian footballer

Personal information
- Full name: Branislav Danilović
- Date of birth: 24 June 1988 (age 38)
- Place of birth: Belgrade, SFR Yugoslavia
- Height: 1.90 m (6 ft 3 in)
- Position: Goalkeeper

Team information
- Current team: Diósgyőr
- Number: 44

Youth career
- –2007: Rad

Senior career*
Years	Team	Apps	(Gls)
2007–2014	Rad	86	(0)
2013	→ BSK Borča (loan)	11	(0)
2014–2019	Puskás Akadémia	45	(0)
2015–2016	→ Videoton (loan)	25	(0)
2016–2017	→ Debrecen (loan)	29	(0)
2019–	Diósgyőr	82	(0)

International career
2007	Serbia U-19	6	(0)
2009–2010	Serbia U-21	6	(0)
- * Club domestic league appearances and goals as of 19 June 2025

Branislav Danilović (Serbian Cyrillic: Бранислав Даниловић; born 24 June 1988) is a Serbian football goalkeeper who plays for Diósgyőri VTK.

== Club statistics ==
Club	Season	League		Cup		League Cup		Europe		Total	
Club	Season	Apps	Goals	Apps	Goals	Apps	Goals	Apps	Goals	Apps	Goals
Rad
Rad	2007–08	12	0	0	0	0	0	0	0	12	0
Rad	2008–09	6	0	0	0	0	0	0	0	6	0
Rad	2009–10	17	0	0	0	0	0	0	0	17	0
Rad	2010–11	8	0	1	0	0	0	0	0	9	0
Rad	2011–12	22	0	1	0	0	0	4	0	27	0
Rad	2012–13	5	0	0	0	0	0	0	0	5	0
Rad	2013–14	16	0	0	0	0	0	0	0	16	0
Rad	Total	86	0	2	0	0	0	4	0	92	0
Borča
Borča	2012–13	11	0	0	0	0	0	0	0	11	0
Borča	Total	11	0	0	0	0	0	0	0	11	0
Puskás Akadémia
Puskás Akadémia	2014–15	27	0	1	0	1	0	0	0	29	0
Puskás Akadémia	2017–18	3	0	2	0	0	0	0	0	5	0
Puskás Akadémia	2018–19	15	0	3	0	0	0	0	0	18	0
Puskás Akadémia	Total	45	0	6	0	1	0	0	0	52	0
Videoton
Videoton	2015–16	25	0	4	0	0	0	5	0	34	0
Videoton	Total	25	0	4	0	0	0	5	0	34	0
Debrecen
Debrecen	2016–17	29	0	1	0	0	0	0	0	30	0
Debrecen	Total	29	0	1	0	0	0	0	0	30	0
Diósgyőr
Diósgyőr	2019–20	30	0	1	0	–	–	–	–	31	0
Diósgyőr	2020–21	5	0	2	0	–	–	–	–	7	0
Diósgyőr	Total	35	0	3	0	0	0	0	0	38	0
Career Total		231	0	16	0	1	0	9	0	257	0

Updated to games played as of 20 May 2021.
