= Josip Knežević =

Croatian footballer (born 1988)

Personal information
- Date of birth: 3 October 1988 (age 38)
- Place of birth: Osijek, SR Croatia, SFR Yugoslavia
- Height: 1.83 m (6 ft 0 in)
- Position: Midfielder

Team information
- Current team: BSK Bijelo Brdo
- Number: 30

Youth career
- 1999–2006: Osijek

Senior career*
Years	Team	Apps	(Gls)
2006–2009	Osijek	69	(12)
2010–2013	Amkar Perm	20	(1)
2012	→ Kairat (loan)	16	(6)
2013–2014	Kairat	47	(16)
2015	Kaisar	11	(1)
2016–2017	Osijek	43	(6)
2017–2021	Puskás Akadémia	110	(40)
2021–2022	Al-Arabi	12	(4)
2023	Šibenik	12	(0)
2023–	BSK Bijelo Brdo	27	(2)

International career
2006	Croatia U18	2	(0)
2006–2007	Croatia U19	8	(0)
2008–2009	Croatia U20	4	(1)
2009	Croatia U21	3	(0)
- * Club domestic league appearances and goals as of 5 May 2024

Josip Knežević (born 3 October 1988) is a Croatian international footballer who plays for Croatian club BSK Bijelo Brdo.

== Playing career ==
=== Club ===
Knežević has started his career in senior professional team of NK Osijek on 2005/2006 at the age of 17. He has regularly played for Croatia national team U-18, U-19, U-20 and U-21, has total 13 caps in the Croatia national team for young players. Now, Josip Knežević is an active member of the Croatia national under-21 team. This season 2008/2009 he is actually second on the list of assists of Croatian Championship Prva HNL with 7 assists.

On 12 February 2010 Knežević moved to Russian side Amkar Perm in a deal initially worth €500,000. Two years later, in January 2012, Knežević signed a season-long loan deal with Kazakhstan Premier League outfit FC Kairat. After an impressive start, in which he scored 3 goals in 5 appearances, Knežević suffered a mid-season injury, but still ended up as the teams topscorer with 6 goals (3 – pen.). At the end of Kneževićs loan deal he returned to Amkar Perm, before signing a permanent three-year contract with FC Kairat in February 2013.

After six-months without a team, Knežević signed a six-month contract with FC Kaisar.

=== International ===
Knežević is former youth international player for the Croatian U21, U19 and U17 sides.

== Career statistics ==
=== Club statistics ===
Club	Season	League		Cup		Europe		Total	
Club	Season	Apps	Goals	Apps	Goals	Apps	Goals	Apps	Goals
Osijek
Osijek	2006–07	7	1	0	0	0	0	7	1
Osijek	2007–08	13	0	0	0	–	–	13	0
Osijek	2008–09	25	5	0	0	–	–	25	5
Osijek	2009–10	15	5	2	0	–	–	17	5
Osijek	2015–16	12	2	0	0	–	–	12	2
Osijek	2016–17	31	4	1	0	–	–	32	4
Osijek	2017–18	0	0	0	0	1	0	32	4
Osijek	Total	103	17	3	0	1	0	107	13
Amkar Perm
Amkar Perm	2010	13	0	1	0	–	–	14	0
Amkar Perm	2011–12	7	1	1	1	–	–	8	2
Amkar Perm	Total	20	1	2	1	0	0	22	2
Kairat
Kairat	2012	16	6	0	0	–	–	16	6
Kairat	2013	30	10	1	0	–	–	31	10
Kairat	2014	17	6	1	1	4	1	22	8
Kairat	Total	63	22	2	1	4	1	69	24
Kaisar
Kaisar	2015	11	1	0	0	–	–	11	1
Kaisar	Total	11	1	0	0	0	0	11	1
Puskás Akadémia
Puskás Akadémia	2017–18	27	11	9	4	–	–	36	15
Puskás Akadémia	2018–19	24	12	3	0	–	–	27	12
Puskás Akadémia	2019–20	30	8	3	0	–	–	33	8
Puskás Akadémia	2020–21	29	9	3	1	–	–	32	10
Puskás Akadémia	Total	110	40	18	5	0	0	128	45
Career Total		307	81	25	7	5	1	338	89

Updated to games played as of 15 May 2021.
