= Péter Szakály =

Hungarian footballer

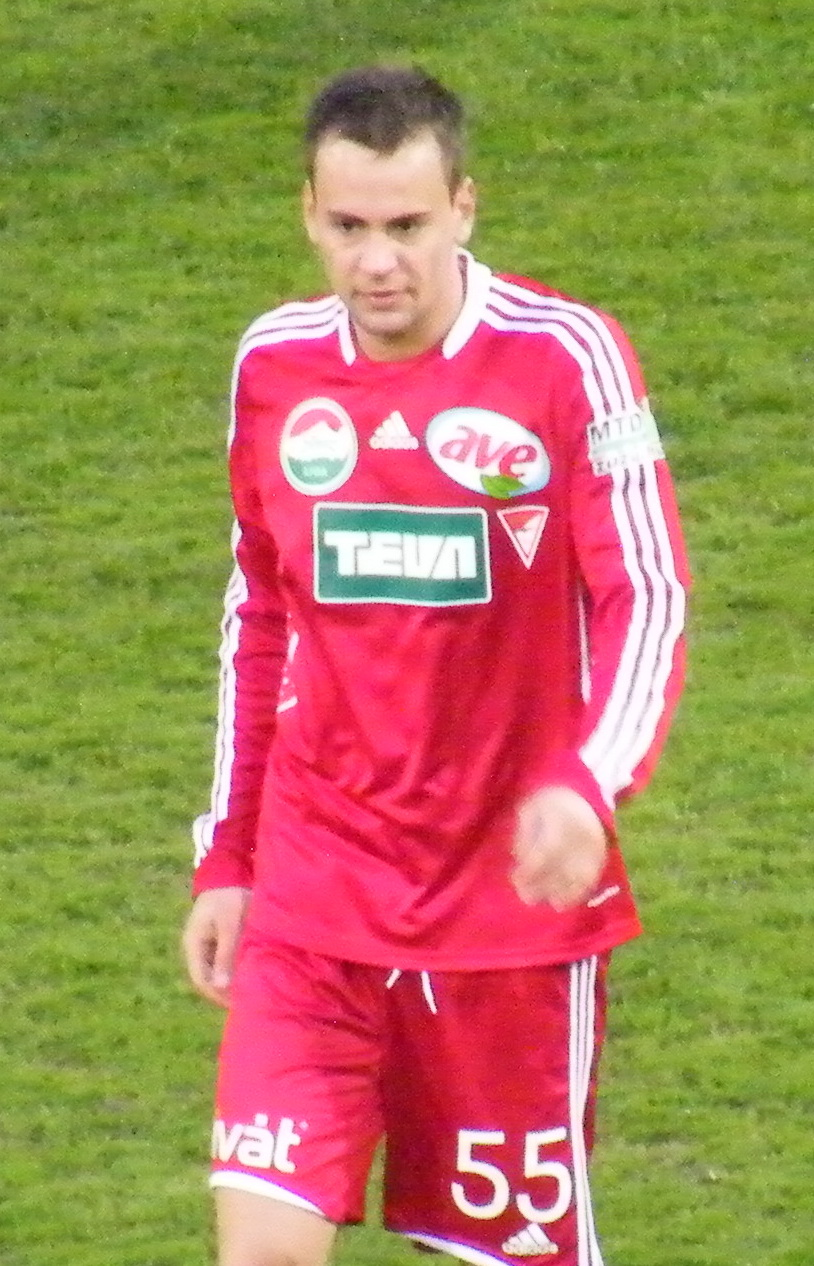

Personal information
- Date of birth: 17 August 1986 (age 40)
- Place of birth: Nagyatád, Hungary
- Height: 1.82 m (6 ft 0 in)
- Position: Left midfielder

Youth career
- Nagyatád

Senior career*
Years	Team	Apps	(Gls)
2004–2007	Kaposvár	69	(7)
2007–2017	Debrecen	218	(42)
2017–2019	Puskás Akadémia	57	(10)
2019–2022	Újpest	53	(3)

International career
2004–2005	Hungary U19	5	(0)
2007–2008	Hungary U21	7	(0)
2012–2014	Hungary	6	(0)
- * Club domestic league appearances and goals as of 13 May 2022

Péter Szakály (Hungarian pronunciation: [ˈpeːtɛr ˈsɒkaːj]; born 17 August 1986) is a Hungarian football midfielder.

== Club career ==
=== Debrecen ===
Szakály won the 2009–10 season of the Hungarian League with Debrecen despite his team lost to Kecskeméti TE in the last round. In 2010 Debrecen beat Zalaegerszegi TE in the Hungarian Cup final in the Puskás Ferenc Stadium by 3–2.

On 1 May 2012 Szakály won the Hungarian Cup with Debrecen by beating MTK Budapest on penalty shoot-out in the 2011–12 season. This was the fifth Hungarian Cup trophy for Debrecen.

On 12 May 2012 Szakály won the Hungarian League title with Debrecen after beating Pécs in the 28th round of the Hungarian League by 4–0 at the Oláh Gábor út Stadium which resulted the sixth Hungarian League title for the Hajdús. In January 2017, he left Debrecen, after 9 years period. In this club he played 211 matches and scored 42 goals.

=== Puskas Akademia ===
He signed contract with Puskas Akademia in March 2017. Contract ended in June 2019 and Szakaly left club.

== Career statistics ==
Appearances and goals by club, season and competition
Club	Season	League		Cup		League Cup		Europe		Total	
Club	Season	Apps	Goals	Apps	Goals	Apps	Goals	Apps	Goals	Apps	Goals
Kaposvár
Kaposvár	2004–05	3	0	1	0	0	0	0	0	4	0
Kaposvár	2005–06	25	3	0	0	0	0	0	0	25	3
Kaposvár	2006–07	27	3	3	0	0	0	0	0	27	3
Kaposvár	2007–08	14	1	2	0	0	0	0	0	16	2
Kaposvár	Total	69	7	5	0	0	0	0	0	74	7
Debrecen
Debrecen	2007–08	6	0	0	0	5	1	0	0	11	1
Debrecen	2008–09	27	9	4	0	1	0	0	0	32	9
Debrecen	2009–10	26	7	5	0	2	0	12	0	45	7
Debrecen	2010–11	27	4	1	0	3	0	10	1	41	5
Debrecen	2011–12	29	6	4	3	0	0	0	0	33	9
Debrecen	2012–13	19	3	3	3	1	0	6	1	30	7
Debrecen	2013–14	29	7	5	1	0	0	2	0	36	8
Debrecen	2014–15	24	3	2	1	7	0	4	0	37	4
Debrecen	2015–16	19	2	6	0	0	0	5	1	30	3
Debrecen	2016–17	12	1	1	0	0	0	4	2	17	3
Debrecen	Total	218	42	31	8	19	1	43	5	311	56
Puskás Akadémia
Puskás Akadémia	2016–17	18	5	0	0	0	0	0	0	18	5
Puskás Akadémia	2017–18	23	5	6	0	0	0	0	0	29	5
Puskás Akadémia	2018–19	16	0	5	0	0	0	0	0	21	0
Puskás Akadémia	Total	57	10	11	0	0	0	0	0	68	10
Újpest
Újpest	2019–20	20	0	5	1	–	–	–	–	25	1
Újpest	Total	20	0	5	1	0	0	0	0	25	1
Career total		364	59	52	9	19	1	43	5	478	74

Updated to games played as of 27 June 2020.

== Honours ==
Debrecen

- Hungarian League (4): 2008–09, 2009–10, 2011–12, 2013–14
- Hungarian Cup (2): 2009–10, 2011–12

== National team ==
On 1 June 2012 Szakály debuted in the Hungary national team against the Czech Republic. The final result was 2–1 to Hungary. In all he played six matches with the national team between 2012 and 2014.

== Personal life ==
His younger brother, Dénes Szakály, is also a footballer.
