= János Hegedűs =

Hungarian footballer

Personal information
- Full name: János Krisztián Hegedűs
- Date of birth: 4 October 1996 (age 30)
- Place of birth: Budapest, Hungary
- Height: 1.89 m (6 ft 2 1/2 in)
- Position: Defender

Team information
- Current team: FK Csíkszereda
- Number: 24

Youth career
- 2003–2007: Törökbálint
- 2007–2008: Újpest
- 2007–2008: → Törökbálint (loan)
- 2008–2011: Törökbálint
- 2009–2011: Budaörs
- 2011–2015: Haladás

Senior career*
Years	Team	Apps	(Gls)
2015–2017	Haladás	18	(1)
2015–2016	→ Budaörs (loan)	29	(2)
2017–2020	Puskás Akadémia	43	(4)
2020–2023	Diósgyőr	50	(3)
2023	Vasas	5	(0)
2023–2025	Paks	1	(0)
2024	→ Siófok (loan)	12	(0)
2024–2025	→ FK Csíkszereda (loan)	30	(1)
2025–	FK Csíkszereda	36	(0)

International career
2013	Hungary U18	1	(0)
2017–2018	Hungary U21	5	(0)
- * Club domestic league appearances and goals as of 7 November 2026

János Krisztián Hegedűs (born 4 October 1996) is a Hungarian professional footballer who plays as a defender for Liga I club FK Csíkszereda.

== Club career ==
On 16 December 2022, Hegedűs signed with Vasas.

On 19 June 2023, it was announced that Hegedűs had signed a contract with Paks. He has made a contract for the next three years.

== Honours ==
Puskás Akadémia

- Nemzeti Bajnokság II: 2016–17
- Magyar Kupa runner-up: 2017–18
