= Patrik Poór =

Hungarian footballer (born 1993)

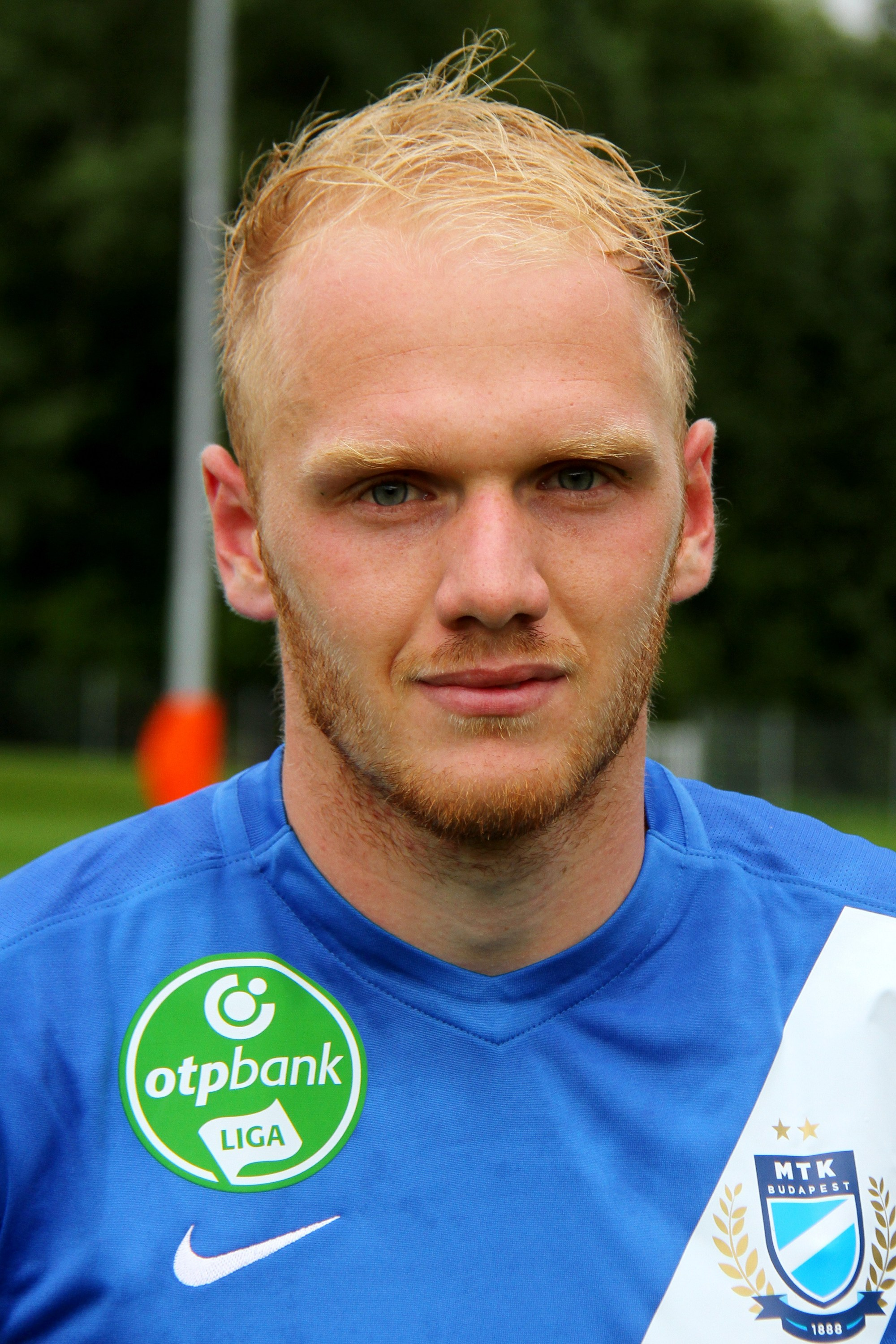
- Poór with MTK Budapest in 2016

Personal information
- Full name: Patrik Péter Poór
- Date of birth: 15 November 1993 (age 33)
- Place of birth: Győr, Hungary
- Height: 1.85 m (6 ft 1 in)
- Position: Defender

Team information
- Current team: Szentlőrinc
- Number: 42

Youth career
- 2005–2007: Győr
- 2007–2009: MTK Budapest
- 2009–2011: Liverpool

Senior career*
Years	Team	Apps	(Gls)
2011–2017	MTK Budapest	116	(3)
2017–2019	Puskás Akadémia	38	(0)
2019–2020	Paks	15	(0)
2020–2022	Debrecen	25	(0)
2022–2023	MTK Budapest	22	(0)
2023–2024	BVSC-Zugló	12	(0)
2024–	Szentlőrinc	36	(0)

International career^{‡}
2009	Hungary U-17	4	(0)
2011–2012	Hungary U-19	5	(0)
2012–2014	Hungary U-21	6	(0)
2014–	Hungary	1	(0)
- * Club domestic league appearances and goals as of 31 May 2026 ‡ National team caps and goals as of 5 March 2014

Patrik Poór (born 15 November 1993) is a Hungarian football player who plays for Szentlőrinc.

== Club career ==
On 29 July 2022, Poór returned to MTK Budapest.

== Career statistics ==
Appearances and goals by club, season and competition
Club	Season	League			Cup		League Cup		Europe		Total	
Club	Season	Division	Apps	Goals	Apps	Goals	Apps	Goals	Apps	Goals	Apps	Goals
MTK
MTK	2011–12	Nemzeti Bajnokság II	1	0	0	0	0	0	—		1	0
MTK	2012–13	Nemzeti Bajnokság I	8	0	0	0	5	0	—		13	0
MTK	2013–14	Nemzeti Bajnokság I	25	0	6	0	1	0	—		32	0
MTK	2014–15	Nemzeti Bajnokság I	21	1	3	0	5	0	—		29	1
MTK	2015–16	Nemzeti Bajnokság I	28	0	3	0	—		0	0	31	0
MTK	2016–17	Nemzeti Bajnokság I	33	2	1	0	—		4	0	38	2
MTK	Total		116	3	13	0	11	0	4	0	144	3
Puskás Akadémia
Puskás Akadémia	2017–18	Nemzeti Bajnokság I	17	0	6	0	—		—		23	0
Puskás Akadémia	2018–19	Nemzeti Bajnokság I	21	0	4	0	—		—		25	0
Puskás Akadémia	Total		38	0	10	0	0	0	0	0	48	0
Paks	2019–20	Nemzeti Bajnokság I	15	0	5	3	—		—		20	3
Debrecen
Debrecen	2020–21	Nemzeti Bajnokság II	17	0	3	0	—		—		20	0
Debrecen	2021–22	Nemzeti Bajnokság I	8	0	0	0	—		—		8	0
Debrecen	Total		25	0	3	0	0	0	0	0	28	0
Career total			194	3	31	3	11	0	4	0	240	6

Updated to games played as of 15 May 2022.
