= 2018–19 Újpest FC season =

Újpest FC
2018–19 season
- Chairman: Roland Duchâtelet
- Manager: Nebojša Vignjević
- NB 1: 5th
- Magyar Kupa: Round of 32 vs Kaposvári
- UEFA Europa League: Second qualifying round vs Sevilla
- Top goalscorer: League: Soma Novothny (8); All: Soma Novothny (9)
Home colours	Away colours	Third colours

The 2018–19 season was Újpest Football Club's 138th competitive season, 127nd consecutive season in the OTP Bank Liga and 126th year in existence as a football club.

== Squad ==
Note: Flags indicate national team as defined under FIFA eligibility rules; some limited exceptions apply. Players may hold more than one non-FIFA nationality.

No.	Pos.	Nation	Player
1	GK	SRB	Filip Pajović
2	DF	HUN	Kristóf Szűcs
4	DF	MKD	Kire Ristevski
5	DF	HUN	Róbert Litauszki (captain)
6	MF	NGR	Obinna Nwobodo
7	FW	HUN	Krisztián Simon
9	FW	NGR	Theophilus Solomon
10	MF	HUN	Donát Zsótér
14	MF	MLI	Alassane Diallo
18	MF	CRO	Bojan Sanković
19	DF	MNE	Mijuško Bojović
21	MF	HUN	Benjamin Balázs
22	DF	HUN	Dávid Mohl

No.	Pos.	Nation	Player
23	GK	HUN	Dávid Banai
24	MF	HUN	Barnabás Rácz
26	MF	HUN	Dániel Nagy
27	MF	ROU	Lóránt Kovács
30	MF	NGR	Vincent Onovo
31	FW	COD	Rosy Lubaki
35	GK	HUN	Bence Gundel-Takács
49	MF	SRB	Branko Pauljević
68	DF	BIH	Dženan Bureković
77	MF	GEO	Giorgi Beridze (on loan from Gent)
90	FW	CIV	Lacina Traoré
99	FW	HUN	Dániel Lukács (on loan from Honvéd)

=== Out on loan ===
Note: Flags indicate national team as defined under FIFA eligibility rules; some limited exceptions apply. Players may hold more than one non-FIFA nationality.

No. / Pos. / Nation / Player; 9 / FW / HUN / Patrik Tischler (at Honvéd)	No. / Pos. / Nation / Player; 86 / FW / HUN / Soma Novothny (at Busan IPark)

== Transfers ==
=== In ===
Date	Position	Nationality	Name	From	Fee	Ref.
19 July 2018	DF	(Romania)	Răzvan Horj	Viitorul Constanța	Undisclosed	
31 August 2018	FW	(Democratic Republic of the Congo)	Rosy Lubaki	Sanga Balende	Undisclosed	
24 September 2018	DF	(North Macedonia)	Kire Ristevski		Free	
1 February 2019	MF	(Romania)	Lóránt Kovács	Haladás	Undisclosed	
1 February 2019	MF	(Hungary)	Barnabás Rácz	Haladás	Undisclosed	
19 February 2019	FW	(Nigeria)	Theophilus Solomon	Inter Zaprešić	Undisclosed	
23 February 2019	FW	(Ivory Coast)	Lacina Traoré	AS Monaco	Free	

=== Out ===
Date	Position	Nationality	Name	To	Fee	Ref.
	DF	(Hungary)	Dávid Kálnoki-Kis	Budapest Honvéd	Undisclosed	
	MF	(Hungary)	Gergő Németh	Gyirmót	Undisclosed	
	MF	(Hungary)	József Windecker	Levadiakos	Undisclosed	
	MF	(Mali)	Souleymane Diarra	Lens	Undisclosed	
31 August 2018	FW	(North Macedonia)	Viktor Angelov	Shkupi	Undisclosed	
19 December 2019	DF	(Hungary)	Bence Pávkovics	Debrecen	Undisclosed	
11 January 2019	MF	(Hungary)	Benjámin Cseke	Paksi	Undisclosed	
30 January 2019	DF	(Hungary)	Dávid Mohl	Haladás	Undisclosed	
26 February 2019	DF	(Romania)	Răzvan Horj	CFR Cluj	Undisclosed	

=== Loans in ===
Date	Position	Nationality	Name	From	Date to	Ref.
9 August 2018	MF	(Georgia (country))	Giorgi Beridze	Gent	End of season	
31 August 2018	FW	(Hungary)	Dániel Lukács	Budapest Honvéd	End of season	

=== Loans out ===
Date	Position	Nationality	Name	To	Date to	Ref.
28 August 2018	FW	(Hungary)	Patrik Tischler	Budapest Honvéd	End of season	
31 August 2018	DF	(Hungary)	Bence Pávkovics	Debrecen	19 December 2018	
14 March 2019	FW	(Hungary)	Soma Novothny	Busan IPark	End of 2019	

== Competitions ==
=== Nemzeti Bajnokság I ===
==== League table ====
Pos	Team	Pld	W	D	L	GF	GA	GD	Pts	Qualification or relegation
3	Debrecen	33	14	9	10	44	39	+5	51	Qualification for the Europa League first qualifying round (Note: Since the winners of the 2018–19 Magyar Kupa, Vidi, qualified for European competition based on league position, the spot awarded to the cup winners (Europa League first qualifying round) was passed to the fourth-placed team.)
4	Honvéd	33	13	10	10	46	38	+8	49	Qualification for the Europa League first qualifying round
5	Újpest	33	12	12	9	38	28	+10	48	
6	Mezőkövesd	33	12	8	13	45	40	+5	44	
7	Puskás Akadémia	33	11	7	15	36	45	−9	40	

Source: Hungarian Football Federation (in Hungarian), Soccerway
Rules for classification: 1) Points; 2) Matches won; 3) Goal difference; 4) Goals scored; 5) Head-to-head points; 6) Head-to-head goal difference; 7) Head-to-head away goals scored; 8) Fair play ranking; 9) Drawing of lots.

==== Results summary ====
Overall								Home						Away					
Pld	W	D	L	GF	GA	GD	Pts	W	D	L	GF	GA	GD	W	D	L	GF	GA	GD
33	12	12	9	38	28	+10	48	8	7	2	20	8	+12	4	5	7	18	20	−2

Last updated: 19 May 2019.
Source: See Results

==== Results ====
22 July 2018 1	Újpest	0 – 2	MTK Budapest	Budapest
19:30 CEST (UTC+2)	Pauljević (red card) 60'; Balázs (red card) 90+1'; Diallo (yellow card) 90+2'	Report	Kulcsár (yellow card) 1'; Lencse 26'; Kanta 90+2' (pen.)	Stadium: Szusza Ferenc Stadion; Attendance: 2,738; Referee: Viktor Kassai

29 July 2018 2	Szombathelyi Haladás	2 – 2	Újpest	Szombathely
18:00 CEST (UTC+2)	Rabušic 23'; Jagodics 61' (yellow card) 87'; Bošnjak (yellow card) 73'	Report	Nagy 19'; Horj (yellow card) 28' (goal) 41'; Novothny (yellow card) 87'	Stadium: Haladás Sportkomplexum; Attendance: 4,965; Referee: Jozsef Erdos

5 August 2018 3	Újpest	1 – 0	Kisvárda	Budapest
18:00 CEST (UTC+2)	Nagy (yellow card) 50'; Diallo 66'; Zsótér (yellow card) 82'	Report	Gosztonyi (yellow card) 19'; Felipe (yellow card) 34'; Ilić (yellow card) 47'; Berios (yellow card) 75'	Stadium: Szusza Ferenc Stadion; Attendance: 2,029; Referee: Sandor Ando-Szabo

12 August 2018 4	Paks	1 – 1	Újpest	Paks
17:00 CEST (UTC+2)	Bertus 24'; Kulcsár (yellow card) 66'; Nagy (yellow card) 90+1'	Report	Diallo 3' (yellow card) 85'; Novothny (yellow card) 43'; Balázs (yellow card) 85'	Stadium: Fehérvári úti Stadion; Attendance: 800; Referee: Balazs Berke

18 August 2018 5	Újpest	1 – 1	Mezőkövesd	Budapest
19:30 CEST (UTC+2)	Zsótér 89'	Report	Szalai 4'; Szeles (yellow card) 43' (yellow-red card) 45+1'	Stadium: Szusza Ferenc Stadion; Attendance: 2,075; Referee: Csaba Pintér

1 September 2018 7	Újpest	0 – 0	Budapest Honvéd	Budapest
19:30 CEST (UTC+2)	D.Nagy (yellow card) 49'	Report	G.Nagy (yellow card) 19'; Kukoč (yellow card) 44'; Heffler (yellow card) 48'	Stadium: Szusza Ferenc Stadion; Attendance: 3,561; Referee: Zoltán Iványi

15 September 2018 8	Újpest	1 – 0	Debrecen	Budapest
17:00 CEST (UTC+2)	Nagy 22'; Zsótér (yellow card) 37'; Bureković (yellow card) 62'; Diallo (yellow card) 90'	Report	Kinyik (yellow card) 37'	Stadium: Szusza Ferenc Stadion; Attendance: 2,595; Referee: Adam Farkas

29 September 2018 9	Ferencváros	1 – 0	Újpest	Budapest
19:30 CEST (UTC+2)	Leandro (yellow card) 38'; Lanzafame 58' (yellow card) 59'	Report	Litauszki (yellow card) 26'	Stadium: Groupama Arena; Attendance: 20,675; Referee: Sandor Ando-Szabo

6 October 2018 10	Újpest	2 – 0	Puskás Akadémia	Budapest
17:00 CEST (UTC+2)	Nwobodo 52'; Novothny 73' (yellow card) 86'; Ristevski (yellow card) 87'	Report	Spandler (yellow card) 26'; Varga (yellow card) 60'	Stadium: Szusza Ferenc Stadion; Attendance: 1,799; Referee: Jozsef Erdos

20 October 2018 11	Diósgyőr	1 – 2	Újpest	Miskolc
17:00 CEST (UTC+2)	Brković (yellow card) 45'; Márkvárt 58'; Tóth (yellow card) 75'; Shestakov (yellow card) 90+3'	Report	Bojović (yellow card) 52'; Ristevski (yellow card) 66'; Beridze 75', 89'	Stadium: Diósgyőri Stadion; Attendance: 3,940; Referee: Tamás Bognár

27 October 2018 12	MTK Budapest	1 – 0	Újpest	Budapest
14:30 CEST (UTC+2)	Bognár 17' (pen.); Gera (yellow card) 35'; Lencse (yellow card) 70'	Report	Nwobodo (yellow card) 24'	Stadium: Hidegkuti Nándor Stadion; Attendance: 3,093; Referee: Zoltán Iványi

3 November 2018 13	Újpest	2 – 0	Szombathelyi Haladás	Budapest
17:00 CET (UTC+1)	Onovo (yellow card) 54'; Balázs 71'; Bojović (yellow card) 74'; Nwodobo 81'	Report	Mészáros (yellow card) 56'; Kovács (yellow card) 59'; Tamás (yellow card) 70'; Gaál (yellow card) 75'	Stadium: Szusza Ferenc Stadion; Attendance: 2,350; Referee: Ferenc Karakó

10 November 2018 14	Kisvárda	1 – 4	Újpest	Kisvárda
17:00 CET (UTC+1)	Lucas 31'; Berios (yellow card) 34'; Vári (yellow card) 77'; Sassá (yellow card) 90'	Report	Nwobodo (yellow card) 36'; Novothny 42', 73', 86'; Izing 49' (o.g.)	Stadium: Várkerti Stadion; Attendance: 2,280; Referee: Ádám Németh

21 November 2018 6	MOL Vidi	1 – 0	Újpest	Székesfehérvár
19:00 CET (UTC+1)	Milanov (yellow card) 34'; Juhász 58'; Hadžić (yellow card) 60'	Report	Onovo (yellow card) 62'; Bojović (yellow card) 90+1'	Stadium: MOL Aréna Sóstó; Attendance: 11,251; Referee: Sandor Ando-Szabo

24 November 2018 15	Újpest	1 – 1	Paks	Budapest
17:00 CET (UTC+1)	Beridze 60'; Bojović (yellow card) 86'	Report	Papp (yellow card) 27'; Kulcsár (yellow card) 47'; Bartha (yellow card) 52'; Fejes 84'	Stadium: Szusza Ferenc Stadion; Attendance: 1,435; Referee: Péter Solymosi

1 December 2018 16	Mezőkövesd	0 – 0	Újpest	Mezőkövesd
17:00 CET (UTC+1)	Dražić (yellow card) 54'	Report	Beridze (yellow card) 51'; Ristevski (yellow card) 61'	Stadium: Mezőkövesdi Városi Stadion; Attendance: 1,256; Referee: Balzas Berke

8 December 2018 17	Újpest	2 – 0	MOL Vidi	Budapest
19:30 CET (UTC+1)	Novothny 26' (yellow card) 84'; Nwobodo 33'; Litauszki (yellow card) 81'; Onovo (yellow card) 81'	Report	Šćepović (yellow card) 29'; Pátkai (yellow card) 47'; Milanov (yellow card) 81'	Stadium: Szusza Ferenc Stadion; Attendance: 1,674; Referee: Adam Farkas

15 December 2018 18	Budapest Honvéd	2 – 2	Újpest	Bozsik Stadion
19:30 CET (UTC+1)	Škvorc (yellow card) 7' (yellow-red card) 39'; Holender 41' (pen.); Tischler 88'	Report	Pajović (yellow card) 42'; Beridze 46'; Novothny 65'; Sanković (yellow card) 78'; Balázs (yellow card) 90+1'	Stadium: Bozsik Stadion; Attendance: 1,891; Referee: Peter Solymosi

2 February 2019 19	Debreceni	0 – 0	Újpest	Debrecen
17:00 CET (UTC+1)	Kinyik (yellow card) 32' (yellow-red card) 81'; Tőzsér (yellow card) 52'; Haris (yellow card) 73'; Kusnyír (yellow card) 88'	Report	Pauljević (yellow card) 3'	Stadium: Nagyerdei Stadion; Attendance: 3,026; Referee: Ferenc Karakó

9 February 2019 20	Újpest	1 – 1	Ferencváros	Budapest
19:30 CET (UTC+1)	Nagy (yellow card) 45'; Bureković (yellow card) 83'; Novothny (yellow card) 83'; Simon 90+3'	Report	Varga 11'; Böde (yellow card) 41'; Dibusz (yellow card) 86'; Dvali (yellow card) 88'; Leandro (yellow card) 90+1'	Stadium: Szusza Ferenc Stadion; Attendance: 8,719; Referee: Adam Farkas

16 February 2019 21	Puskás Akadémia	0 – 1	Újpest	Felcsút
17:00 CET (UTC+1)	Tamás (yellow card) 5'; Bokros (yellow card) 32'	Report	Bokros 52' (o.g.); Ristevski (yellow card) 67'	Stadium: Pancho Aréna; Attendance: 1,412; Referee: Tamas Bognár

23 February 2019 22	Újpest	5 – 0	Diósgyőr	Budapest
17:00 CET (UTC+1)	Nwobodo 5'; Onovo 18'; Nagy 48'; Bureković 70'; Zsótér 90'	Report	Tajti (yellow card) 68'; Márkvárt (yellow card) 90+1'	Stadium: Szusza Ferenc Stadion; Attendance: 2,767; Referee: Istvan Vad

2 March 2019 23	Újpest	0 – 0	MTK Budapest	Budapest
17:00 CET (UTC+1)		Report	Bidzilya (yellow card) 50'; Gera (yellow card) 58'; Kychak (yellow card) 76'; Pintér (yellow card) 89'	Stadium: Szusza Ferenc Stadion; Attendance: 2,782; Referee: Peter Solymosi

9 March 2019 24	Szombathelyi Haladás	3 – 2	Újpest	Szombathely
17:00 CET (UTC+1)	Habovda (yellow card) 53'; Bamgboye 62', 67' (yellow card) 68'; Németh 65'; Ofosu (yellow card) 83'	Report	Novothny 17', 38'; Ristevski (yellow card) 72'; Traoré (yellow card) 85'	Stadium: Haladás Sportkomplexum; Attendance: 3,023; Referee: Sandor Ando-Szabo

16 March 2019 25	Újpest	1 – 0	Kisvárda	Budapest
17:00 CET (UTC+1)	Onovo (yellow card) 10'; Traoré 23' (pen.); Nwobodo (yellow card) 45'; Bureković (yellow card) 67'	Report	Kravchenko (yellow card) 23'; Seco (yellow card) 53'; Lukyanchuk (yellow card) 84'	Stadium: Szusza Ferenc Stadion; Attendance: 2,090; Referee: Jozsef Erdos

30 March 2019 26	Paks	0 – 2	Újpest	Paks
17:00 CET (UTC+1)	Lenzsér (yellow card) 44'; Bobál (yellow card) 67'; Zsidai (yellow card) 79'	Report	Bobál 60' (o.g.); Bureković (yellow card) 64'; Traoré 68' (pen.); Diallo (yellow card) 85'	Stadium: Fehérvári úti Stadion; Attendance: 1,400; Referee: Adam Farkas

6 April 2019 27	Újpest	2 – 1	Mezőkövesd	Budapest
17:00 CEST (UTC+2)	Beridze (yellow card) 39'; Ristevski (yellow card) 75'; Zsótér (yellow card) 78' (goal) 85'; Traoré 83' (pen.)	Report	Szalai (yellow card) 6'; Dražić 21'; Szappanos (yellow card) 60'; Meskhi (yellow card) 79'; Iszlai (yellow card) 81'	Stadium: Szusza Ferenc Stadion; Attendance: 2,288; Referee: Peter Solymosi

13 April 2019 28	MOL Vidi	2 – 1	Újpest	Székesfehérvár
19:30 CEST (UTC+2)	Hodžić 18'; Kovács (yellow card) 32'; Juhász (yellow card) 46'; Futács 71'	Report	Kovács (yellow card) 23'; Zsótér (yellow card) 42' (goal) 64'; Bureković (yellow card) 52'; Onovo (yellow card) 75'	Stadium: MOL Aréna Sóstó; Attendance: 4,457; Referee: Zoltan Ivanyi

20 April 2019 29	Újpest	0 – 0	Budapest Honvéd	Budapest
17:00 CEST (UTC+2)	Pauljević (yellow card) 44'; Balázs (yellow card) 53'; Traoré (yellow card) 78'	Report	Bamba (yellow card) 19'	Stadium: Szusza Ferenc Stadion; Attendance: 3,884; Referee: Sandor Ando-Szabo

27 April 2019 30	Újpest	1 – 1	Debrecen	Budapest
17:00 CEST (UTC+2)	Onovo (yellow card) 33'; Litauszki 40'; Traoré (yellow card) 84'	Report	Csősz (yellow card) 33'; Bényei (yellow card) 40'; Tőzsér 78'	Stadium: Szusza Ferenc Stadion; Attendance: 3,557; Referee: Balazs Berke

4 May 2019 31	Ferencváros	2 – 1	Újpest	Budapest
19:30 CEST (UTC+2)	Varga 22'; Lanzafame 50' (yellow card) 74'; Gorriarán (yellow card) 90+3'; Kharatin (yellow card) 90+5'	Report	Nagy (yellow card) 21' (goal) 39'; Ristevski (yellow card) 45'; Zsótér (yellow card) 89'; Onovo (yellow card) 90+5'; Litauszki (yellow card) 90+7'	Stadium: Groupama Arena; Attendance: 20,057; Referee: Sandor Ando-Szabo

11 May 2019 32	Újpest	0 – 1	Puskás Akadémia	Budapest
17:00 CEST (UTC+2)	Sanković (yellow card) 62'; Solomon (yellow card) 72'	Report	Poór (yellow card) 5'; Szakály (yellow card) 35'; Knežević 57'; Szolnoki (yellow card) 78'	Stadium: Szusza Ferenc Stadion; Attendance: 2,717; Referee: Zoltan Ivanyi

19 May 2019 33	Diósgyőr	3 – 0	Újpest	Miskolc
17:00 CEST (UTC+2)	Bacsa (yellow card) 28'; Tajti 36'; Márkvárt (yellow card) 36'; Tamás (yellow card) 64'; Korbély 81'; Hasani 90+1'	Report	Solomon (yellow card) 42' (yellow-red card) 79'; Zsótér (yellow card) 50'; Onovo (yellow card) 70'; Kovács (yellow card) 77'	Stadium: Diósgyőri Stadion; Attendance: 12,203; Referee: Zoltan Ivanyi

=== Magyar Kupa ===
22 September 2018 6th Round	Bátaszék	1 – 7	Újpest	Bátaszék
15:00 CEST (UTC+2)	Kertész 37'	Report	Balázs 19'; Beridze 28'; Bojović 54', 73'; Lukács 67'; Zsótér 82'; Cseke 86'	Stadium: Vicze János Sportpálya; Referee: Imre Kovács

31 October 2018 Round of 64	Győr	2 – 3 (a.e.t.)	Újpest	Győr
15:00 CET (UTC+1)	Andrić 47' (yellow card) 64'; Magasföldi 67'	Report	Nwobodo 21', 99' (yellow card) 81'; Ristevski (yellow card) 62'; Onovo 76'; Sanković (yellow card) 118'; Zsótér (yellow card) 119'	Stadium: ETO Park; Attendance: 6,000; Referee: Gergely Kovács

5 December 2018 Round of 32	Kaposvár	1 – 0	Újpest	Kaposvár
18:00 CET (UTC+1)	Borbély 90+1'	Report		Stadium: Stadion Kaposvár Rákóczi; Attendance: 1,900; Referee: Szabolcs Szilasi

=== UEFA Europa League ===
==== Qualifying rounds ====
12 July 2018 First qualifying round 1st leg	Neftchi Baku (Azerbaijan)	3 – 1	(Hungary) Újpest	Baku, Azerbaijan
18:00 CEST (UTC+2)	Dabo 23', 72' (yellow card) 62'; Makhmudov (yellow card) 66' (goal) 90+2'	Report	Nagy 9'; Litauszki (yellow card) 78'	Stadium: Dalga Arena; Attendance: 4,000; Referee: Dennis Higler (Netherlands)
Note: Neftçi Baku played their home matches at Dalga Arena, Baku, instead of their regular stadium Bakcell Arena, Baku

27 July 2018 First qualifying round 2nd leg	Újpest (Hungary)	4 – 0 (5 – 3 agg.)	(Azerbaijan) Neftchi Baku	Budapest, Hungary
21:00 CEST (UTC+2)	Litauszki 19'; Sanković 22'; Zsótér 50' (yellow card) 57'; Nwobodo 65'; Diallo (yellow card) 69'	Report	A.Krivotsyuk (yellow card) 30'; Bralić (yellow card) 57'	Stadium: Szusza Ferenc stadion Attendance: 3,738; Referee: Ioannis Papadopoulos (Greece)

26 July 2018 Second qualifying round 1st leg	Sevilla (Spain)	4 – 0	(Hungary) Újpest	Seville, Spain
21:45 CEST (UTC+2)	Navas 7'; Ben Yedder 32' (pen.); Sarabia 43'; Pareja (yellow card) 62'; Vázquez 90+2'	Report	Pauljević (red card) 31'	Stadium: Ramón Sánchez Pizjuán; Attendance: 29,671; Referee: Andris Treimanis (Latvia)

2 August 2018 Second qualifying round 2nd leg	Újpest (Hungary)	1 – 3 (1 – 7 agg.)	(Spain) Sevilla	Budapest, Hungary
21:00 CEST (UTC+2)	Diallo (yellow card) 69'; Zsótér 77'	Report	Sarabia 36', 50'; Muriel 83'	Stadium: Szusza Ferenc stadion Attendance: 9,750; Referee: Kirill Levnikov (Russia)

== Squad statistics ==
As of Match played 19 May 2019

=== Appearances and goals ===
No.	Pos	Nat	Player	Total		NB I		Magyar Kupa		Europa League	
No.	Pos	Nat	Player	Apps	Goals	Apps	Goals	Apps	Goals	Apps	Goals
1	GK	(Serbia) SRB	Filip Pajović	34	0	28	0	2	0	4	0
2	DF	(Hungary) HUN	Kristóf Szűcs	5	0	2+1	0	0	0	0+2	0
4	DF	(North Macedonia) MKD	Kire Ristevski	24	0	22	0	2	0	0	0
5	DF	(Hungary) HUN	Róbert Litauszki	29	2	23	1	2	0	4	1
6	MF	(Nigeria) NGR	Obinna Nwobodo	33	7	26+1	4	3	2	3	1
7	FW	(Hungary) HUN	Krisztián Simon	10	1	2+8	1	0	0	0	0
9	FW	(Nigeria) NGR	Theophilus Solomon	10	0	1+9	0	0	0	0	0
10	MF	(Hungary) HUN	Donát Zsótér	39	7	23+9	4	0+3	1	4	2
14	MF	(Mali) MLI	Alassane Diallo	20	2	6+9	2	2	0	3	0
18	MF	(Croatia) CRO	Bojan Sanković	36	1	29+2	0	1	0	4	1
19	DF	(Montenegro) MNE	Mijuško Bojović	25	2	18+1	0	2	2	4	0
21	MF	(Hungary) HUN	Benjamin Balázs	26	2	13+6	1	3	1	2+2	0
22	DF	(Hungary) HUN	Dávid Mohl	3	0	0+3	0	0	0	0	0
23	GK	(Hungary) HUN	Dávid Banai	4	0	4	0	0	0	0	0
24	MF	(Hungary) HUN	Barnabás Rácz	13	0	12+1	0	0	0	0	0
26	MF	(Hungary) HUN	Dániel Nagy	29	5	15+9	4	1	0	4	1
27	MF	(Romania) ROU	Lóránt Kovács	5	0	4+1	0	0	0	0	0
30	MF	(Nigeria) NGR	Vincent Onovo	32	2	26+3	1	3	1	0	0
31	FW	(Democratic Republic of the Congo) COD	Rosy Lubaki	1	0	0+1	0	0	0	0	0
35	GK	(Hungary) HUN	Bence Gundel-Takács	2	0	1	0	1	0	0	0
49	DF	(Serbia) SRB	Branko Pauljević	36	0	26+5	0	2	0	3	0
68	DF	(Bosnia and Herzegovina) BIH	Dženan Bureković	35	1	28	1	2+1	0	4	0
77	MF	(Georgia (country)) GEO	Giorgi Beridze	30	5	19+8	4	2+1	1	0	0
90	FW	(Ivory Coast) CIV	Lacina Traoré	9	3	8+1	3	0	0	0	0
99	FW	(Hungary) HUN	Dániel Lukács	11	1	0+7	0	3	1	0+1	0
Players away on loan :
9	FW	(Hungary) HUN	Patrik Tischler	8	0	1+4	0	0	0	0+3	0
86	FW	(Hungary) HUN	Soma Novothny	30	8	21+2	8	1+2	0	4	0
Players who left Újpest during the season:
8	MF	(Hungary) HUN	Benjámin Cseke	4	1	1	0	0+1	1	1+1	0
17	DF	(Romania) ROU	Răzvan Horj	5	1	2	1	1	0	0+2	0
27	MF	(Hungary) HUN	Bence Pávkovics	1	0	1	0	0	0	0	0
99	FW	(North Macedonia) MKD	Viktor Angelov	3	0	0+3	0	0	0	0	0

=== Goal scorers ===
Place	Position	Nation	Number	Name	NB I	Magyar Kupa	Europa League	Total
1	FW	(Hungary)	86	Soma Novothny	8	0	0	8
2	MF	(Nigeria)	6	Obinna Nwobodo	4	2	1	7
2	MF	(Hungary)	10	Donát Zsótér	4	1	2	7
4	MF	(Georgia (country))	77	Giorgi Beridze	4	1	0	5
4	MF	(Hungary)	26	Dániel Nagy	4	0	1	5
6	FW	(Ivory Coast)	90	Lacina Traoré	3	0	0	3
6				Own goal	3	0	0	3
7	MF	(Hungary)	21	Benjamin Balázs	1	1	0	2
7	MF	(Mali)	14	Alassane Diallo	2	0	0	2
7	MF	(Nigeria)	30	Vincent Onovo	1	1	0	2
7	DF	(Hungary)	5	Róbert Litauszki	1	0	1	2
7	DF	(Montenegro)	19	Mijuško Bojović	0	2	0	2
12	DF	(Romania)	17	Răzvan Horj	1	0	0	1
12	MF	(Hungary)	7	Krisztián Simon	1	0	0	1
12	DF	(Bosnia and Herzegovina)	68	Dženan Bureković	1	0	0	1
12	FW	(Hungary)	99	Dániel Lukács	0	1	0	1
12	MF	(Hungary)	8	Benjámin Cseke	0	1	0	1
12	MF	(Croatia)	18	Bojan Sanković	0	0	1	1
				TOTALS	38	10	5	53

=== Disciplinary record ===
Number	Nation	Position	Name	NB I		Magyar Kupa		Europa League		Total	
Number	Nation	Position	Name	Yellow card	Red card	Yellow card	Red card	Yellow card	Red card	Yellow card	Red card
1	(Serbia)	GK	Filip Pajović	1	0	0	0	0	0	1	0
4	(North Macedonia)	DF	Kire Ristevski	7	0	1	0	0	0	8	0
5	(Hungary)	DF	Róbert Litauszki	3	0	0	0	1	0	4	0
6	(Nigeria)	MF	Obinna Nwobodo	3	0	1	0	0	0	4	0
9	(Nigeria)	FW	Theophilus Solomon	3	1	0	0	0	0	3	1
10	(Hungary)	MF	Donát Zsótér	6	0	1	0	1	0	8	0
14	(Mali)	MF	Alassane Diallo	4	0	0	0	2	0	6	0
17	(Romania)	DF	Răzvan Horj	1	0	0	0	0	0	1	0
18	(Croatia)	MF	Bojan Sanković	2	0	1	0	0	0	3	0
19	(Montenegro)	DF	Mijuško Bojović	4	0	0	0	0	0	4	0
21	(Hungary)	MF	Benjamin Balázs	3	1	0	0	0	0	3	1
26	(Hungary)	MF	Dániel Nagy	4	0	0	0	0	0	4	0
27	(Romania)	MF	Lóránt Kovács	2	0	0	0	0	0	2	0
30	(Nigeria)	MF	Vincent Onovo	8	0	0	0	0	0	8	0
49	(Serbia)	MF	Branko Pauljević	2	1	0	0	0	0	2	1
68	(Bosnia and Herzegovina)	DF	Dženan Bureković	5	0	0	0	0	0	5	0
77	(Georgia (country))	MF	Giorgi Beridze	2	0	0	0	0	0	2	0
90	(Ivory Coast)	FW	Lacina Traoré	3	0	0	0	0	0	3	0
Players away on loan:
86	(Hungary)	FW	Soma Novothny	5	0	0	0	0	0	5	0
Players who left Újpest during the season:
			TOTALS	68	3	4	0	4	1	76	4
