= 2017–18 Újpest FC season =

Újpest
2017–18 season
- Owner: Roderick Duchâtelet
- Manager: Nebojša Vignjević
- Stadium: Szusza Ferenc Stadion
- Nemzeti Bajnokság I: 3rd
- Magyar Kupa: Winners
- Top goalscorer: League: Soma Novothny (17); All: Soma Novothny (19)
- Highest home attendance: 9,596 v Ferencváros (31 March 2018, Nemzeti Bajnokság I)
- Lowest home attendance: 410 v Paks (27 February 2018, Magyar Kupa)
- Average home league attendance: 2,380
- Biggest win: 6–0 v Öttevény (Away, 20 September 2017, Magyar Kupa)
- Biggest defeat: 0–3 v Videoton (Away, 7 April 2017, Nemzeti Bajnokság I)
Home colours	Away colours	Third colours

The 2017–18 season was Újpest Football Club's 113th competitive season, 107th consecutive season in the Nemzeti Bajnokság I and 116th year in existence as a football club. In addition to the domestic league, Újpest participated in that season's editions of the Magyar Kupa.

Besides Újpest, Vasas also played their matches at the Szusza Ferenc Stadion during the season due to the ongoing construction of the Illovszky Rudolf Stadion.

The club reached their 17th Magyar Kupa final, where they won the match 5–4 on penalties following a 2–2 draw after extra time for their tenth title against Puskás Akadémia. Following the cup success, Újpest secured the 3rd place in the Nemzeti Bajnokság I, after a 2–1 win against Debrecen in the last round.

This was the first ever season since 2006–07 without former captain Szabolcs Balajcza, who departed for Siófok in the summer and first time since 2010–11 without Balázs Balogh who departed to Puskás Akadémia.

== Squad ==
Squad at end of season

Note: Flags indicate national team as defined under FIFA eligibility rules; some limited exceptions apply. Players may hold more than one non-FIFA nationality.

No.	Pos.	Nation	Player
1	GK	SRB	Filip Pajović
2	DF	HUN	Kristóf Szűcs
4	DF	HUN	Dávid Kálnoki-Kis
5	DF	HUN	Róbert Litauszki
6	MF	HUN	József Windecker
7	MF	HUN	Krisztián Simon
8	MF	HUN	Benjámin Cseke
9	FW	HUN	Patrik Tischler
10	MF	HUN	Donát Zsótér
14	MF	MLI	Alassane Diallo
18	MF	MNE	Bojan Sanković
19	DF	MNE	Mijuško Bojović
21	MF	HUN	Benjamin Balázs

No.	Pos.	Nation	Player
22	DF	HUN	Dávid Mohl
23	GK	HUN	Dávid Banai
24	FW	SRB	Marko Filipović
25	MF	MKD	Remzifaik Selmani
26	MF	HUN	Dániel Nagy
27	MF	HUN	Bence Pávkovics
28	MF	NGA	Obinna Nwobodo
29	MF	HUN	Gergő Németh
30	MF	NGA	Vincent Onovo
35	GK	HUN	Bence Gundel-Takács
49	DF	SRB	Branko Pauljević
68	DF	BIH	Dženan Bureković
86	FW	HUN	Soma Novothny

== Transfers ==
=== Transfers in ===
Transfer window	Pos.	No.	Player	From
Summer	FW	—	(Hungary) Bence Gelencsér	Ferencváros
Summer	DF	—	(Hungary) Balázs Hajnal	Youth team
Summer	DF	—	(Hungary) Róbert Horváth	Youth team
Summer	FW	—	(Hungary) Máté Hulicsár	Kecskeméti LC
Summer	DF	—	(Hungary) Zsolt Máté	Honvéd
Summer	N/A	—	(Hungary) Árpád Németh	Youth team
Summer	MF	—	(Hungary) Kristóf Németh	Youth team
Summer	GK	1	(Serbia) Filip Pajović	(Serbia) Čukarički
Summer	DF	5	(Hungary) Róbert Litauszki	Free agent (Note: Previous club Cracovia.)
Summer	MF	7	(Hungary) Krisztián Simon	Free agent (Note: Previous club 1860 Munich.)
Summer	FW	9	(Hungary) Patrik Tischler	Puskás Akadémia
Summer	MF	10	(Hungary) Donát Zsótér	(Belgium) Sint-Truidense
Summer	MF	14	(Mali) Alassane Diallo	Free agent (Note: Previous club Standard Liège.)
Summer	DF	19	(Montenegro) Mijuško Bojović	Free agent (Note: Previous club Gyirmót.)
Summer	FW	24	(Serbia) Marko Filipović	Vasas Kubala Akadémia
Summer	MF	25	(North Macedonia) Remzifaik Selmani	(North Macedonia) Renova
Summer	MF	26	(Hungary) Dániel Nagy	(Germany) Würzburger Kickers
Summer	MF	28	(Nigeria) Obinna Nwobodo	(Nigeria) Enugu Rangers
Summer	MF	29	(Hungary) Gergő Németh	Free agent (Note: Previous club Sturm Graz.)
Summer	GK	35	(Hungary) Bence Gundel-Takács	Puskás Akadémia
Summer	DF	49	(Serbia) Branko Pauljević	Puskás Akadémia
Summer	FW	86	(Hungary) Soma Novothny	(Belgium) Sint-Truidense
Winter	MF	30	(Nigeria) Vincent Onovo	Free agent (Note: Previous club HJK.)
Winter	DF	68	(Bosnia and Herzegovina) Dženan Bureković	Free agent (Note: Previous club Vojvodina.)

=== Transfers out ===
Transfer window	Pos.	No.	Player	To
Summer	GK	1	(Hungary) Szabolcs Balajcza	Released (Note: Joined Siófok.)
Summer	DF	3	(Belgium) Jonathan Heris	Puskás Akadémia
Summer	MF	7	(North Macedonia) Enis Bardhi	(Spain) Levante
Summer	MF	8	(Hungary) Balázs Balogh	Puskás Akadémia
Summer	MF	10	(Hungary) Kylian Hazard	(England) Chelsea
Summer	FW	11	(Montenegro) Mihailo Perović	(Serbia) Voždovac
Summer	MF	14	(Hungary) Gábor Nagy	Released (Note: Joined Zalaegerszeg.)
Summer	MF	19	(Serbia) Nemanja Andrić	Released (Note: Joined Balmazújváros.)
Summer	DF	27	(Hungary) Sándor Molnár	BKV Előre
Summer	DF	28	(Hungary) Zoltán Gubacsi	Salgótarján
Summer	MF	28	(Hungary) János Lázok	Released
Winter	GK	32	(Hungary) Zoltán Kovács	Zalaegerszeg

=== Loans in ===
Transfer window	Pos.	No.	Player	From	End date
Summer	MF	16	(Sweden) Anton Salétros	(Sweden) AIK	Middle of season

=== Loans out ===
Transfer window	Pos.	No.	Player	To	End date
Summer	MF	20	(Mali) Souleymane Diarra	(France) Lens	End of season
Summer	FW	25	(Hungary) Zoltán Gere	Salgótarján	End of season
Winter	FW	17	(North Macedonia) Viktor Angelov	(North Macedonia) Rabotnički	End of season

== Competitions ==
=== Overview ===
Competition	First match	Last match	Starting round	Final position	Record							
Competition	First match	Last match	Starting round	Final position	Pld	W	D	L	GF	GA	GD	Win %
Nemzeti Bajnokság I	15 July 2017	2 June 2018	Matchday 1	3rd	33	12	13	8	41	38	+3	36.36
Magyar Kupa	20 September 2017	23 May 2018	Round of 128	Winners	10	7	2	1	26	7	+19	70.00
Total					43	19	15	9	67	45	+22	44.19

Source: Competitions

=== Nemzeti Bajnokság I ===
==== League table ====
Pos	Team	Pld	W	D	L	GF	GA	GD	Pts	Qualification or relegation
1	Videoton (C)	33	20	8	5	65	28	+37	68	Qualification for the Champions League first qualifying round
2	Ferencváros	33	18	12	3	69	31	+38	66	Qualification for the Europa League first qualifying round (Note: Since the winners of the 2017–18 Magyar Kupa, Újpest, qualified for European competition based on league position, the spot awarded to the cup winners (Europa League first qualifying round) was passed to the fourth-placed team.)
3	Újpest	33	12	13	8	41	38	+3	49	Qualification for the Europa League first qualifying round
4	Honvéd	33	13	8	12	50	53	−3	47	Qualification for the Europa League first qualifying round
5	Debrecen	33	12	8	13	53	47	+6	44	

Source: Hungarian Football Federation (in Hungarian), Soccerway
Rules for classification: 1) Points; 2) Matches won; 3) Goal difference; 4) Goals scored; 5) Head-to-head points; 6) Head-to-head goal difference; 7) Head-to-head away goals scored; 8) Fair play ranking; 9) Drawing of lots.
(C) Champions

==== Results summary ====
Overall								Home						Away					
Pld	W	D	L	GF	GA	GD	Pts	W	D	L	GF	GA	GD	W	D	L	GF	GA	GD
33	12	13	8	41	38	+3	49	6	7	3	22	19	+3	6	6	5	19	19	0

Source: Hungarian Football Federation

==== Results by round ====
Round	1	2	3	4	5	6	7	8	9	10	11	12	13	14	15	16	17	18	19	20	21	22	23	24	25	26	27	28	29	30	31	32	33
Ground	A	H	A	H	A	H	A	H	A	A	H	H	A	H	A	H	A	H	A	H	H	A	A	H	A	H	A	H	A	H	A	A	H
Result	D	D	D	W	L	D	W	L	L	W	D	D	L	D	W	W	W	D	L	W	L	W	D	D	L	W	D	W	D	L	D	W	W
Position	5	7	8	7	9	7	6	8	9	7	8	9	9	9	8	5	5	4	5	4	4	4	3	4	6	4	3	3	4	6	5	3	3
Points	1	2	3	6	6	7	10	10	10	13	14	15	15	16	19	22	25	26	26	29	29	32	33	34	34	37	38	41	42	42	43	46	49

Source: Matches
A = Away; H = Home; W = Win; D = Draw; L = Loss

==== Matches ====
15 July 2017 1	Paks	2–2	Újpest	Paks
18:00 CEST (UTC+2)	Szakály 16'; Papp (yellow card) 38', (goal) 48'; Bartha (yellow card) 50'; Lenzsér (yellow card) 82'	Report	Pauljević 13', (yellow card) 65'; Windecker 68'	Stadium: Fehérvári úti Stadion; Attendance: 1,330; Referee: Ferenc Karakó

23 July 2017 2	Újpest	2–2	Ferencváros	Budapest
18:00 CEST (UTC+2)	Novothny 27'; Nwobodo (yellow card) 39'; Nagy 63'; Balázs (yellow card) 69'; Litauszki (yellow card) 78'; Windecker (yellow card) 84'	Report	Batik (yellow card) 9'; Priskin 36'; Gorriarán (yellow card) 78'; Varga 90'	Stadium: Szusza Ferenc Stadion; Attendance: 6,567; Referee: Zoltán Iványi

30 July 2017 3	Videoton	2–2	Újpest	Felcsút (Note: The match was played at the Pancho Aréna in Felcsút, instead of Videoton regular stadium, the Sóstói Stadion in Székesfehérvár, built in 1967 which was demolished to make way to the newly built Sóstói Stadion.)
18:00 CEST (UTC+2)	Hadžić (yellow card) 47', (goal) 88'; Lazović (yellow card) 51'; Šćepović 86'; Szabó (yellow card) 90+3'	Report	Nagy 7', 70', (yellow card) 80'; Novothny (yellow card) 37'; Nwobodo (yellow card) 58'; Bojović (yellow card) 76'	Stadium: Pancho Aréna; Attendance: 2,364; Referee: Tamás Bognár

6 August 2017 4	Újpest	1–0	Vasas	Budapest
20:00 CEST (UTC+2)	D. Nagy 25'	Report		Stadium: Szusza Ferenc stadion Attendance: 0 Referee: Péter Solymosi
Note: As of HFF decision the fixture were played on closed doors and the start date postponed from 18:00 due to excessive heat.

12 August 2017 5	Honvéd	2–1	Újpest	Budapest
18:00 CEST (UTC+2)	Kamber (yellow card) 55', (goal) 82'; Lanzafame 73'; Baráth (yellow card) 90+3'	Report	Zsótér 8'	Stadium: Bozsik József Stadion; Attendance: 3,478; Referee: Ádám Farkas

19 August 2017 6	Újpest	1–1	Diósgyőr	Budapest
20:30 CEST (UTC+2)	Novothny (yellow card) 36'; D. Nagy (yellow card) 40'; Zsótér (yellow card) 69'; Angelov 81', (yellow card) 90+4'	Report	Makrai 12'; Vela (yellow card) 43'; Kocsis (yellow card) 75'; Karan (yellow card) 79'; Szarka (red card) 90'	Stadium: Szusza Ferenc Stadion; Attendance: 0 Referee: István Vad

26 August 2017 7	Balmazújváros	0–1	Újpest	Balmazújváros
18:00 CEST (UTC+2)	Tamás (yellow card) 86'	Report	Bojović (yellow card) 23'; Simon 64'; Litauszki (yellow card) 79'; Tischler (yellow card) 83'	Stadium: Városi Sportpálya; Attendance: 2,062; Referee: Viktor Kassai

9 September 2017 8	Újpest	1–3	Puskás Akadémia	Budapest
20:30 CEST (UTC+2)	Zsótér (yellow card) 61'; Novothny 72'	Report	Diallo 22'; Osváth (yellow card) 29'; Knežević 49' (pen.), 53', (yellow card) 87'	Stadium: Szusza Ferenc Stadion; Attendance: 0 Referee: Sándor Andó-Szabó

16 September 2017 9	Haladás	1–0	Újpest	Sopron (Note: The match was played at the Káposztás utcai Stadion in Sopron, instead of Haladás regular stadium, the Rohonci út in Szombathely, which was demolished to make way to the newly built Haladás Sportkomplexum.)
18:00 CEST (UTC+2)	Kovács (yellow card) 45'; Williams 53'; Martínez (yellow card) 81'	Report	Salétros (yellow card) 36'; Windecker (yellow card) 72'	Stadium: Káposztás utcai Stadion; Attendance: 1,710; Referee: József Erdős

23 September 2017 10	Mezőkövesd	2–4	Újpest	Mezőkövesd
18:15 CEST (UTC+2)	Cseri 28'; Mlinar (yellow card) 35'; Szeles (yellow card) 80'; Fótyik 84'; Baracskai (yellow card) 85'; Střeštík (yellow card) 88'	Report	Litauszki (yellow card) 27'; Tischler 60'; Novothny 62', 78', 86' (pen.); Mohl (yellow card) 76'	Stadium: Városi Stadion; Attendance: 2,386; Referee: Péter Solymosi

30 September 2017 11	Újpest	1–1	Debrecen	Budapest
18:00 CEST (UTC+2)	Pávkovics 23'; Mohl (yellow card) 43'; Nwobodo (yellow card) 45'; Novothny (yellow card) 81'	Report	Takács 35'; Varga (yellow card) 38'; Tőzsér (yellow card) 46'; Jovanović (yellow card) 88'	Stadium: Szusza Ferenc Stadion; Attendance: 3,139; Referee: Ferenc Karakó

14 October 2017 12	Újpest	0–0	Paks	Budapest
15:30 CEST (UTC+2)	Balázs (yellow card) 63'; Pávkovics (yellow card) 80'; Nwobodo (yellow card) 87'	Report		Stadium: Szusza Ferenc Stadion; Attendance: 2,047; Referee: Ádám Farkas

21 October 2017 13	Ferencváros	1–0	Újpest	Budapest
15:30 CEST (UTC+2)	Gorriarán (yellow card) 57'; Böde 82'	Report	Windecker (yellow card) 23'; Nwobodo (yellow card) 24'; Sanković (yellow card) 45'; Litauszki (yellow card) 60'; Zsótér (yellow card) 67'; Novothny (yellow card) 90+1'	Stadium: Groupama Arena; Attendance: 14,114; Referee: Zoltán Iványi

28 October 2017 14	Újpest	2–2	Videoton	Budapest
15:30 CEST (UTC+2)	Zsótér (yellow card) 45'; Pauljević 50'; Pávkovics (yellow card) 64'; Tischler 73'; Nagy (yellow card) 74'; Sanković (yellow card) 82'	Report	Henty 1'; Hadžić 5', (red card) 37'; Šćepović (yellow card) 57'; Stopira (yellow card) 59'; Pátkai (yellow card) 62'; Suljić (red card) 89'	Stadium: Szusza Ferenc stadion Attendance: 1,593; Referee: Péter Solymosi

4 November 2017 15	Vasas	0–1	Újpest	Dunaújváros (Note: The match was played at the Dunaújváros Stadion in Dunaújváros, instead of the Szusza Ferenc Stadion in Budapest, due to the planned stadium of Vasas, the Illovszky Rudolf Stadion is under construction. The club temporarily played at the home of Újpest and they cannot choose the same venue for matches between them.)
15:30 CET (UTC+1)		Report	Pávkovics (yellow card) 41'; Novothny (yellow card) 45', (goal) 69'; Mohl (yellow card) 89'	Stadium: Dunaújvárosi Stadion; Attendance: 1,200; Referee: Zoltán Iványi

18 November 2017 16	Újpest	2–1	Honvéd	Budapest
15:30 CET (UTC+1)	Pauljević (yellow card) 12'; Tischler 22'; Balázs (yellow card) 49'; Windecker 61'	Report	Eppel (yellow card) 71'; Lanzafame (yellow card) 81', (goal) 83'	Stadium: Szusza Ferenc Stadion; Attendance: 0 Referee: Tamás Bognár

25 November 2017 17	Diósgyőr	1–2	Újpest	Debrecen (Note: The match was played at the Nagyerdei Stadion in Debrecen, instead of Diósgyőr regular stadium, the Diósgyőri Stadion in Miskolc, opened in 1939 which was demolished to make way to the newly built Diósgyőri Stadion.)
15:30 CET (UTC+1)	Ugrai 29'; Lipták (yellow card) 64'; Vela (yellow card) 77'	Report	Novothny 1', 38'; Litauszki (yellow card) 70'; Sanković (yellow card) 82'	Stadium: Nagyerdei Stadion; Attendance: 1,412; Referee: Csaba Pintér

2 December 2017 18	Újpest	2–2	Balmazújváros	Budapest
15:30 CET (UTC+1)	Windecker (yellow card) 34'; Pauljević (yellow card) 54'; Novothny 67' (pen.), 79' (pen.)	Report	Haris (yellow card) 22', (goal) 40'; Rácz 47'; Tamás (red card) 78'; Vayda (yellow card) 86'	Stadium: Szusza Ferenc Stadion; Attendance: 0 Referee: József Erdős

9 December 2017 19	Puskás Akadémia	2–1	Újpest	Felcsút
15:30 CET (UTC+1)	Knežević (yellow card) 3'; Diallo 7'; Perošević 37', (yellow card) 38'; Spandler (yellow card) 71'; Csilus (yellow card) 74'	Report	Novothny (yellow card) 43'; Nwobodo 58', (yellow card) 83'; Tischler (yellow card) 64'	Stadium: Pancho Aréna; Attendance: 1,328; Referee: Zoltán Iványi

24 February 2018 20	Újpest	1–0	Haladás	Budapest
17:00 CET (UTC+1)	Diallo (yellow card) 6'; Mohl (yellow card) 20'; Novothny 52'; Nagy (yellow card) 55'	Report	Bošnjak (yellow card) 15'; Halmosi (yellow card) 51'; Mi. Németh (red card) 76'	Stadium: Szusza Ferenc Stadion; Attendance: 2,050; Referee: Viktor Kassai

3 March 2018 21	Újpest	2–3	Mezőkövesd	Budapest
17:00 CET (UTC+1)	Novothny 4' (pen.); Nagy 56'; Pajović (yellow card) 78'	Report	Hudák (yellow card) 3'; Mlinar 41', (yellow card) 60'; Koszta 70', 78' (pen.)	Stadium: Szusza Ferenc Stadion; Attendance: 1,546; Referee: István Vad

10 March 2018 22	Debrecen	1–2	Újpest	Debrecen
14:30 CET (UTC+1)	Takács (yellow card) 53'; Könyves 76'	Report	Pauljević (yellow card) 43'; Novothny 58'; Litauszki (yellow card) 70'; Tischler 90'; Simon (yellow card) 90+3'	Stadium: Nagyerdei Stadion; Attendance: 2,701; Referee: Zoltán Iványi

17 March 2018 23	Paks	0–0	Újpest	Paks
17:00 CET (UTC+1)	Hahn (yellow card) 43'; Haraszti (yellow card) 46'; Kecskés (yellow card) 71'; Gévay (yellow card) 76'	Report	Novothny (yellow card) 40'; Nwobodo (yellow card) 51'	Stadium: Fehérvári úti Stadion; Attendance: 400; Referee: Viktor Kassai

31 March 2018 24	Újpest	0–0	Ferencváros	Budapest
17:00 CEST (UTC+2)	Onovo (yellow card) 9'; Balázs (yellow card) 77'	Report	Spirovski (yellow card) 12'; Pedroso (yellow card) 72'; Gorriarán (yellow card) 90+4'	Stadium: Szusza Ferenc Stadion; Attendance: 9,596; Referee: Zoltán Iványi

7 April 2017 25	Videoton	3–0	Újpest	Felcsút
19:30 CEST (UTC+2)	Šćepović 19'; Huszti 54'; Négo 84'	Report	Kálnoki-Kis (yellow card) 45'; Nagy (yellow card) 78'; Novothny (yellow card) 87'	Stadium: Pancho Aréna; Attendance: 2,568; Referee: Sándor Andó-Szabó

14 April 2018 26	Újpest	4–2	Vasas	Budapest
17:00 CEST (UTC+2)	Nwobodo 25'; Novothny 53', 76'; Diallo (yellow card) 61'; Pauljević 66'	Report	Ádám (yellow card) 23'; Egerszegi (yellow card) 28', (goal) 54'; James 33'; Hangya (yellow card) 44'; Vaskó (yellow card) 75'	Stadium: Szusza Ferenc Stadion; Attendance: 2,418; Referee: József Erdős

21 April 2018 27	Honvéd	0–0	Újpest	Budapest
17:00 CEST (UTC+2)		Report	Litauszki (yellow card) 2'; Onovo (yellow card) 21'	Stadium: Bozsik József Stadion; Attendance: 2,640; Referee: Ferenc Karakó

28 April 2018 28	Újpest	1–0	Diósgyőr	Budapest
17:00 CEST (UTC+2)	Novothny 18'	Report	Lipták (yellow card) 31'	Stadium: Szusza Ferenc Stadion; Attendance: 2,836; Referee: Zoltán Iványi

5 May 2018 29	Balmazújváros	1–1	Újpest	Balmazújváros
17:00 CEST (UTC+2)	Andrić 2'	Report	Onovo (yellow card) 14'; Litauszki 68', (yellow card) 88'	Stadium: Városi Sportpálya; Attendance: 1,604; Referee: Péter Solymosi

12 May 2018 30	Újpest	0–1	Puskás Akadémia	Budapest
17:00 CEST (UTC+2)	Litauszki (yellow card) 37'; Diallo (yellow card) 67'; Szűcs (yellow card) 75'; Bureković (yellow card) 90'	Report	Knežević (yellow card) 44'; Molnár (yellow card) 59'; Márkvárt 64'	Stadium: Szusza Ferenc Stadion; Attendance: 2,040; Referee: Ferenc Karakó

19 May 2018 31	Haladás	1–1	Újpest	Szombathely
17:00 CEST (UTC+2)	Má. Németh 9'	Report	Litauszki (yellow card) 37'; Zsótér 49'; Kálnoki-Kis (yellow card) 82'	Stadium: Haladás Sportkomplexum; Attendance: 5,882; Referee: József Erdős

27 May 2018 32	Mezőkövesd	0–1	Újpest	Mezőkövesd
17:00 CEST (UTC+2)	Iszlai (yellow card) 59'; Katanec (red card) 82'	Report	Pauljević 11', (yellow card) 64'	Stadium: Városi Stadion; Attendance: 2,826; Referee: Viktor Kassai

2 June 2018 33	Újpest	2–1	Debrecen	Budapest
19:00 CEST (UTC+2)	Novothny 53'; Nwobodo 63'; Bojović (yellow card) 81'	Report	Kusnyír (yellow card) 28'; Takács 70'	Stadium: Szusza Ferenc Stadion; Attendance: 4,249; Referee: Zsolt Szabó

=== Magyar Kupa ===
20 September 2017 Round of 128	Öttevény	0–6	Újpest	Öttevény
15:00 CEST (UTC+2)		Report	Tischler 23', 32', 41', 44'; Pauljević (yellow card) 71'; Pávkovics 88'; Simon 90+1'	Stadium: Öttevényi TC sporttelep Attendance: 950; Referee: Gyöngyi Gaál

25 October 2017 Round of 64	Gödöllő	0–3	Újpest	Gödöllő
13:30 CEST (UTC+2)	Kaiser (yellow card) 67'; Rakonczay (yellow card) 74'	Report	Tischler 37' (pen.), 48', 64'	Stadium: Szűcs Lajos Sportcentrum; Attendance: 1,500; Referee: Eszter Urbán

29 November 2017 Round of 32	Vecsés	0–5	Újpest	Vecsés
12:00 CET (UTC+1)	Molnár (yellow card) 37'	Report	Kálnoki-Kis 19'; Tischler 44', 51'; Selmani 73'; Simon 77'	Stadium: Stadion Dózsa György út Attendance: 700; Referee: László Lovas

==== Round of 16 ====
27 February 2018 First leg	Újpest	2–0	Paks	Budapest
18:00 CET (UTC+1)	Nagy 15', 67'	Report	Hajdú (yellow card) 46'	Stadium: Szusza Ferenc Stadion; Attendance: 410; Referee: József Erdős
Note: The match was originally scheduled for 20 February 2018, but was postponed due to snow.

6 March 2018 Second leg	Paks	0–2 (0–4 agg.)	Újpest	Paks
17:00 CET (UTC+1)	Lenzsér (yellow card) 72'	Report	Tischler 56', (yellow card) 75'; Nwobodo 83'	Stadium: Fehérvári úti Stadion; Attendance: 400; Referee: Gergely Szőts
Note: Újpest won 4–0 on aggregate.

==== Quarter-finals ====
13 March 2018 First leg	Újpest	2–1	MTK	Budapest
18:00 CET (UTC+1)	Bojović 36'; Nagy 66'	Report	Vass 38'	Stadium: Szusza Ferenc Stadion; Attendance: 1,463; Referee: Balázs Berke

4 April 2018 Second leg	MTK	3–2 (4–4 (a) agg.)	Újpest	Budapest
17:30 CEST (UTC+2)	Kanta 17', 61' (pen.); Talabér (yellow card) 25'; Deutsch (yellow card) 33', (goal) 63'; Lencse (yellow card) 65'	Report	Bureković (yellow card) 35'; Tischler (yellow card) 36'; Diallo (yellow card) 37'; Novothny 53', 83'; Onovo (yellow card) 79'	Stadium: Hidegkuti Nándor Stadion; Attendance: 2,500; Referee: Tamás Bognár
Note: 4–4 on aggregate. Újpest won on away goals.

==== Semi-finals ====
17 April 2018 First leg	Újpest	2–1	Balmazújváros	Budapest
19:00 CEST (UTC+2)	Nagy 19', 33'	Report	Arabuli 85'	Stadium: Szusza Ferenc Stadion; Attendance: 1,775; Referee: Csaba Pintér

9 May 2018 Second leg	Balmazújváros	0–0 (1–2 agg.)	Újpest	Balmazújváros
20:00 CEST (UTC+2)	Habovda (yellow card) 26'; Tamás (yellow card) 66'	Report	Diallo (yellow card) 51'; Nwobodo (yellow card) 76'; Litauszki (yellow card) 81'	Stadium: Városi Sportpálya; Attendance: 1,486; Referee: József Erdős
Note: Újpest won 2–1 on aggregate.

==== Final ====
23 May 2018 Final	Puskás Akadémia	2–2 (a.e.t.) (4–5 p)	Újpest	Budapest
20:00 CEST (UTC+2)	Knežević 38'; Márkvárt (yellow card) 60'; Perošević 66'; J. Hegedűs (yellow card) 109'; L. Hegedűs (yellow card) 113'	Report	Zsótér 55', (yellow card) 88'; Bojović 62'; Nwobodo (yellow card) 105'; Pauljević (yellow card) 113'	Stadium: Groupama Arena; Attendance: 11,270; Referee: Sándor Andó-Szabó
	Penalties
	Perošević (penalty scored); Bačelić-Grgić (penalty scored); Diallo (penalty scored); Henty (penalty missed); Balogh (penalty scored); J. Hegedűs (penalty missed)		(penalty scored) Onovo; (penalty scored) Litauszki; (penalty scored) Diallo; (penalty missed) Balázs; (penalty scored) Zsótér; (penalty scored) Bojović
Note: Újpest won 5–4 on penalties.

== Statistics ==
=== Overall ===
Appearances (Apps) numbers are for appearances in competitive games only, including sub appearances.
Source: Competitions

No.	Player	Pos.	Nemzeti Bajnokság I				Magyar Kupa				Total			
No.	Player	Pos.	Apps	Goal	Booked	Sent off (straight red)	Apps	Goal	Booked	Sent off (straight red)	Apps	Goal	Booked	Sent off (straight red)
1	(Serbia) Filip Pajović	GK	30		1		6				36		1	
2	(Hungary) Kristóf Szűcs	DF	10		1		3				13		1	
4	(Hungary) Dávid Kálnoki-Kis	DF	9		2		3	1			12	1	2	
5	(Hungary) Róbert Litauszki	DF	31	1	10		7		1		38	1	11	
6	(Hungary) József Windecker	MF	18	2	4		1				19	2	4	
7	(Hungary) Krisztián Simon	MF	22	1	1		6	2			28	3	1	
8	(Hungary) Benjámin Cseke	MF	11				4				15			
9	(Hungary) Patrik Tischler	FW	27	4	2		9	10	2		36	14	4	
10	(Hungary) Donát Zsótér	MF	27	2	4		4	1	1		31	3	5	
14	(Mali) Alassane Diallo	MF	11		3		8		2		19		5	
16	(Sweden) Anton Salétros	MF	5		1		1				6		1	
17	(North Macedonia) Viktor Angelov	FW	4	1	1		3				7	1	1	
18	(Montenegro) Bojan Sanković	MF	25		3		8				33		3	
19	(Montenegro) Mijuško Bojović	DF	18		3		9	2			27	2	3	
20	(Mali) Souleymane Diarra	MF	1								1			
21	(Hungary) Benjamin Balázs	MF	27		4		8				35		4	
22	(Hungary) Dávid Mohl	DF	21		4		4				25		4	
23	(Hungary) Dávid Banai	GK					2				2			
24	(Serbia) Marko Filipović	FW												
25	(North Macedonia) Remzifaik Selmani	MF	2				3	1			5	1		
26	(Hungary) Dániel Nagy	MF	28	5	5		6	5			34	10	5	
27	(Hungary) Bence Pávkovics	MF	13	1	3		1	1			14	2	3	
28	(Nigeria) Obinna Nwobodo	MF	30	3	7		10	1	2		40	4	9	
30	(Nigeria) Vincent Onovo	MF	12		3		5		1		17		4	
32	(Hungary) Zoltán Kovács	GK					1				1			
35	(Hungary) Bence Gundel-Takács	GK	3				1				4			
49	(Serbia) Branko Pauljević	DF	30	4	5		8		2		38	4	7	
68	(Bosnia and Herzegovina) Dženan Bureković	DF	11		1		7		1		18		2	
86	(Hungary) Soma Novothny	FW	31	17	8		7	2			38	19	8	
Own goals														
Totals				41	76			26	12			67	88	

=== Hat-tricks ===
No.	Player	Against	Result	Date	Competition
9	(Hungary) Patrik Tischler	Öttevény (A)^{4}	6–0	20 September 2017	Magyar Kupa
86	(Hungary) Soma Novothny	Mezőkövesd (A)	4–2	23 September 2017	Nemzeti Bajnokság I
9	(Hungary) Patrik Tischler	Gödöllő (A)	3–0	25 October 2017	Magyar Kupa

^{4} – Player scored four goals.

=== Clean sheets ===
			Clean sheets		
No.	Player	Games Played	Nemzeti Bajnokság I	Magyar Kupa	Total
1	(Serbia) Filip Pajović	36	9	3	12
23	(Hungary) Dávid Banai	2		2	2
32	(Hungary) Zoltán Kovács	1		1	1
35	(Hungary) Bence Gundel-Takács	4	1	0	1
Totals			10	6	16
