= 2020–21 Újpest FC season =

Újpest FC
2020–21 season
- Chairman: Roland Duchâtelet
- Manager: Predrag Rogan
Home colours	Away colours

The 2020–21 season was Újpest Football Club's 140th competitive season, 129th consecutive season in the OTP Bank Liga and 128th year in existence as a football club.

== Transfers ==
=== Summer ===
In: Note: Flags indicate national team as defined under FIFA eligibility rules; some limited exceptions apply. Players may hold more than one non-FIFA nationality.

No.	Pos.	Nation	Player
8	FW	CIV	Junior Tallo (from (France) Chambly)
10	FW	HUN	Zoltán Stieber (from Zalaegerszeg)
13	DF	GRE	Georgios Koutroumpis (from (Greece) OFI)
15	MF	SRB	Miroslav Bjeloš (from (Serbia) Napredak Kruševac)
17	FW	GEO	Giorgi Beridze (from (Belgium) Gent)
19	DF	POR	Mauro Cerqueira (from (Portugal) Académica Coimbra)
21	DF	SRB	Nemanja Antonov (from (Belgium) Mouscron)
22	MF	SRB	Nikola Mitrović (from Zalaegerszeg)
—	FW	SRB	Petar Gigić (loan from (Serbia) Partizan Beograd)
—	DF	MNE	Jovan Baošić (from (Montenegro) Zeta Golubovci)

Out: Note: Flags indicate national team as defined under FIFA eligibility rules; some limited exceptions apply. Players may hold more than one non-FIFA nationality.

No.	Pos.	Nation	Player
5	DF	HUN	Róbert Litauszki (to Vasas)
6	MF	NGR	Obinna Nwobodo (to (Turkey) Göztepe S.K.)
10	MF	HUN	Donát Zsótér (to Budapest Honvéd)
19	FW	HUN	Márk Koszta (to Zalaegerszeg)
20	FW	ROU	Andreias Calcan (to (Romania) Politehnica Iaşi)
21	MF	HUN	Benjamin Balázs (to MTK Budapest)
28	DF	BEL	Jonathan Heris (to (Belgium) Eupen)
68	DF	BIH	Dženan Bureković (to (Turkey) Göztepe S.K.)
86	FW	HUN	Soma Novothny (to (Germany) Bochum)
—	DF	HUN	Kristóf Szűcs (loan to Ajka)

== Competitions ==
=== Overview ===
Competition	First match	Last match	Starting round	Final position	Record							
Competition	First match	Last match	Starting round	Final position	Pld	W	D	L	GF	GA	GD	Win %
Nemzeti Bajnokság I	15 August 2020	8 May 2021	Matchday 1	TBA	16	5	4	7	20	32	−12	31.25
Hungarian Cup	7 October 2020	TBA	Round of 128	TBA	2	2	0	0	10	0	+10	100.00
Total					18	7	4	7	30	32	−2	38.89

Last updated: 20 December 2020
Source: Competitions

=== Nemzeti Bajnokság I ===
==== League table ====
Pos	Team	Pld	W	D	L	GF	GA	GD	Pts	Qualification or relegation
4	Paks	33	14	8	11	76	64	+12	50	
5	Kisvárda	33	12	10	11	30	36	−6	46	
6	Újpest	33	12	6	15	46	67	−21	42	Qualification for the Europa Conference League second qualifying round (Note: Újpest qualified for the Europa Conference League second qualifying round as the 2020–21 Magyar Kupa winners.)
7	MTK	33	11	9	13	44	49	−5	42	
8	Mezőkövesd	33	11	9	13	40	46	−6	42	

Source: Hungarian Football Federation (in Hungarian), Soccerway
Rules for classification: 1) Points; 2) Matches won; 3) Goal difference; 4) Goals scored; 5) Head-to-head points; 6) Head-to-head goal difference; 7) Head-to-head away goals scored; 8) Fair play ranking; 9) Drawing of lots.

==== Results summary ====
Overall								Home						Away					
Pld	W	D	L	GF	GA	GD	Pts	W	D	L	GF	GA	GD	W	D	L	GF	GA	GD
16	5	4	7	20	32	−12	19	3	2	3	11	15	−4	2	2	4	9	17	−8

Last updated: 20 December 2020.
Source: Soccerway

==== Results by round ====
Round	1	2	3	4	5	6	7	8	9	10	11	12	13	14	15	16	17	18	19	20	21	22	23	24	25	26	27	28	29	30	31	32	33
Ground	A	H	A	H	A	A	H	A	H	A	H	H	A	H	A	H																	
Result	W	D	L	L	W	L	W	L	L	L	W	D	D	L	D	W																	
Position	3	5	5	9	7	9	6	8	10	11	9	8	8	8	10	9																	

Updated to match(es) played on 20 December 2020. Source: Matches
A = Away; H = Home; W = Win; D = Draw; L = Loss

==== Matches ====
15 August 2020 1	Paks	1 – 2	Újpest	Paks
16:30 CEST	Ádám 76'	Report	Simon 16', 62'	Stadium: Stadion PSE; Attendance: 3,870; Referee: Ádám Farkas

23 August 2020 2	Újpest	1 – 1	Budafok	Budapest
17:45 CEST	Simon 35'	Report	Zsóri 69'	Stadium: Szusza Ferenc Stadion; Attendance: 2,861; Referee: Péter Zierkelbach

30 August 2020 3	Puskás Akadémia	3 – 2	Újpest	Felcsút
20:00 CEST	Komáromi 11'; Szolnoki 49'; Plšek 83'	Report	Simon 44'; Máté 86'	Stadium: Pancho Aréna; Attendance: 700; Referee: Ferenc Karakó

13 September 2020 4	Újpest	2 – 4	Kisvárda	Budapest
15:00 CEST	Perošević 28', 40'	Report	Bumba 11'; Simović 24'; Rubus 59'; Datković 64'	Stadium: Szusza Ferenc Stadion; Attendance: 1,410; Referee: Péter Solymosi

27 September 2020 5	Budapest Honvéd	1 – 2	Újpest	Budapest
18:00 CEST	Balogh 30'	Report	Antonov 77'; Simon 80'	Stadium: Hidegkuti Nándor Stadion; Attendance: 2,375; Referee: Péter Solymosi

4 October 2020 6	Fehérvár	5 – 1	Újpest	Székesfehérvár
20:00 CEST	Stopira 58'; Bamgboye 61'; Zivzivadze 66'; Nikolov 68'; Ristevski 88' (o.g.)	Report	Beridze 90+2'	Stadium: MOL Aréna Sóstó; Attendance: 2,673; Referee: Ádám Farkas

17 October 2020 7	Újpest	1 – 0	Mezőkövesd	Budapest
17:00 CEST	Tallo 60'	Report		Stadium: Szusza Ferenc Stadion; Attendance: 1,019; Referee: József Erdős

24 October 2020 8	Ferencváros	2 – 0	Újpest	Budapest
19:30 CET	Nguen 39'; Somália 61'	Report		Stadium: Groupama Arena; Attendance: 15,789; Referee: Gergő Bogár

1 November 2020 9	Újpest	0 – 4	MTK Budapest	Budapest
16:00 CET		Report	Prosser 4', 10'; Miovski 18', 90+3'	Stadium: Szusza Ferenc Stadion; Attendance: 1,150; Referee: Péter Solymosi

6 November 2020 10	Diósgyőr	3 – 0	Újpest	Miskolc
20:00 CET		Report		Stadium: DVTK Stadion

23 December 2020 11	Újpest	3 – 2	Zalaegerszeg	Budapest
18:00 CET	Csongvai 35'; Tallo 62', 65'	Report	Könyves 41'; Favorov 64'	Stadium: Szusza Ferenc Stadion; Attendance: no spectators Referee: Péter Solymosi

27 November 2020 12	Újpest	1 – 1	Paks	Budapest
20:00 CET	Beridze 68'	Report	Ádám 90+1'	Stadium: Szusza Ferenc Stadion; Attendance: x Referee: Bence Csonka
Note: COVID-19 pandemic in Hungary

4 December 2020 13	Budafok	1 – 1	Újpest	Budapest
20:15 CET	Kovács 55' (pen.)	Report	Csongvai 59'	Stadium: Promontor utcai Stadion; Attendance: no spectators Referee: Mihály Káprály

11 December 2020 14	Újpest	1 – 2	Puskás Akadémia	Budapest
20:00 CET	Onovo 75'	Report	Mance 56'; Plšek 71'	Stadium: Szusza Ferenc Stadion; Attendance: x Referee: Péter Zierkelbach
Note: COVID-19 pandemic in Hungary

15 December 2020 15	Kisvárda	1 – 1	Újpest	Kisvárda
18:00 CET	Jelena 90+1'	Report	Szakály 85'	Stadium: Várkerti Stadion; Attendance: x Referee: Ádám Farkas

20 December 2020 16	Újpest	2 – 1	Budapest Honvéd	Budapest
17:00 CET	Beridze 64'; Perošević 77'	Report	Balogh 67'	Stadium: Szusza Ferenc Stadion; Attendance: no spectators Referee: Péter Antal

=== Hungarian Cup ===
7 October 2020 Round of 128	Iváncsa	0 – 4	Újpest	Iváncsa
14:00 CEST		Report	Perošević 29'; Beridze 50', 53'; Szakály 67'	Stadium: Városi Sportpálya; Attendance: 500; Referee: Ádám Pillók

28 October 2020 Round of 64	Dunaújváros	0 – 6	Újpest	Dunaújváros
16:00 CET		Report	Beridze 5', 52'; Bacsa 47'; Gigić 55'; Katona 67'; Stieber 88'	Stadium: Dunaferr Arena; Attendance: 500; Referee: Attila Molnár

=== Appearances and goals ===
Last updated on 20 December 2020.

No.	Pos	Nat	Player	Total		OTP Bank Liga		Hungarian Cup	
No.	Pos	Nat	Player	Apps	Goals	Apps	Goals	Apps	Goals
1	GK	(Serbia) SRB	Filip Pajović	6	-7	5	-7	1	-0
3	DF	(Montenegro) MNE	Jovan Baošić	9	0	7	0	2	0
4	DF	(North Macedonia) MKD	Kire Ristevski	8	0	7	0	1	0
5	DF	(Hungary) HUN	Zsolt Máté	9	1	8	1	1	0
6	MF	(Nigeria) NGR	Obinna Nwobodo	4	0	4	0	0	0
7	MF	(Hungary) HUN	Krisztián Simon	12	5	12	5	0	0
9	FW	(Hungary) HUN	Patrik Bacsa	16	1	14	0	2	1
10	FW	(Hungary) HUN	Zoltán Stieber	7	1	5	0	2	1
11	FW	(Ivory Coast) CIV	Junior Tallo	12	3	11	3	1	0
13	DF	(Greece) GRE	Georgios Koutroumpis	8	0	8	0	0	0
14	MF	(Hungary) HUN	Áron Csongvai	13	2	12	2	1	0
15	MF	(Serbia) SRB	Miroslav Bjeloš	3	0	3	0	0	0
17	FW	(Georgia (country)) GEO	Giorgi Beridze	11	7	9	3	2	4
19	DF	(Portugal) POR	Mauro Cerqueira	3	0	1	0	2	0
21	DF	(Serbia) SRB	Nemanja Antonov	13	1	11	1	2	0
22	MF	(Serbia) SRB	Nikola Mitrović	15	0	14	0	1	0
23	GK	(Hungary) HUN	Dávid Banai	10	-18	9	-18	1	-0
27	MF	(Hungary) HUN	Mátyás Katona	2	1	1	0	1	1
30	MF	(Nigeria) NGR	Vincent Onovo	14	1	13	1	1	0
45	FW	(Serbia) SRB	Petar Gigić	10	1	8	0	2	1
49	DF	(Serbia) SRB	Branko Pauljević	15	0	13	0	2	0
55	MF	(Hungary) HUN	Péter Szakály	13	2	11	1	2	1
62	DF	(Kosovo) KOS	Lirim Kastrati	9	0	9	0	0	0
68	DF	(Bosnia and Herzegovina) BIH	Dženan Bureković	3	0	3	0	0	0
77	FW	(Croatia) CRO	Antonio Perošević	12	4	11	3	1	1
Youth players:
6	DF	(Hungary) HUN	Patrik Eckl	1	0	1	0	0	0
16	FW	(Hungary) HUN	Zsolt Nagy	1	0	1	0	0	0
24	MF	(Hungary) HUN	Barnabás Rácz	0	0	0	0	0	0
25	MF	(Hungary) HUN	Áron Szűcs	1	0	1	0	0	0
26	MF	(Hungary) HUN	Péter Hajdi	1	0	1	0	0	0
28	MF	(Serbia) SRB	Ognjen Radošević	0	0	0	0	0	0
29	MF	(Hungary) HUN	György Varga	1	0	1	0	0	0
31	FW	(Democratic Republic of the Congo) COD	Rosy Lubaki	1	0	0	0	1	0
32	FW	(Hungary) HUN	Levente Laczik	1	0	1	0	0	0
33	FW	(Hungary) HUN	Márk Mucsányi	1	0	0	0	1	0
34	GK	(Hungary) HUN	Zoltán Tomori	0	0	0	-0	0	-0
39	DF	(Hungary) HUN	Csanád Fehér	1	0	1	0	0	0
64	FW	(Hungary) HUN	Dániel Büki	1	0	1	0	0	0
70	DF	(Hungary) HUN	Balázs Hajnal	0	0	0	0	0	0
99	GK	(Hungary) HUN	Márk Németh	1	-4	1	-4	0	-0
Players no longer at the club:

=== Top scorers ===
Includes all competitive matches. The list is sorted by shirt number when total goals are equal.

Last updated on 20 December 2020

Position	Nation	Number	Name	OTP Bank Liga	Hungarian Cup	Total
1	(Georgia (country))	17	Giorgi Beridze	3	4	7
2	(Hungary)	7	Krisztián Simon	5	0	5
3	(Croatia)	77	Antonio Perošević	3	1	4
4	(Ivory Coast)	11	Junior Tallo	3	0	3
5	(Hungary)	14	Áron Csongvai	2	0	2
6	(Hungary)	55	Péter Szakály	1	1	2
7	(Hungary)	5	Zsolt Máté	1	0	1
8	(Serbia)	21	Nemanja Antonov	1	0	1
9	(Nigeria)	30	Vincent Onovo	1	0	1
10	(Hungary)	9	Patrik Bacsa	0	1	1
11	(Serbia)	45	Petar Gigić	0	1	1
12	(Hungary)	27	Mátyás Katona	0	1	1
13	(Hungary)	10	Zoltán Stieber	0	1	1
/	/	/	Own Goals	0	0	0
			TOTALS	20	10	30

=== Disciplinary record ===
Includes all competitive matches. Players with 1 card or more included only.

Last updated on 20 December 2020

Position	Nation	Number	Name	OTP Bank Liga		Hungarian Cup		Total (Hu Total)	
Position	Nation	Number	Name	Yellow card	Red card	Yellow card	Red card	Yellow card	Red card
GK	(Serbia)	1	Filip Pajović	1	0	0	0	1 (1)	0 (0)
DF	(North Macedonia)	4	Kire Ristevski	0	1	0	0	0 (0)	1 (1)
MF	(Hungary)	7	Krisztián Simon	1	0	0	0	1 (1)	0 (0)
FW	(Hungary)	9	Patrik Bacsa	2	0	0	0	2 (2)	0 (0)
FW	(Hungary)	10	Zoltán Stieber	0	1	0	0	0 (0)	1 (1)
FW	(Ivory Coast)	11	Junior Tallo	4	0	0	0	4 (4)	0 (0)
DF	(Greece)	13	Georgios Koutroumpis	2	0	0	0	2 (2)	0 (0)
MF	(Hungary)	14	Áron Csongvai	5	0	0	0	5 (5)	0 (0)
MF	(Serbia)	15	Miroslav Bjeloš	1	0	0	0	1 (1)	0 (0)
FW	(Georgia (country))	17	Giorgi Beridze	3	0	0	0	3 (3)	0 (0)
DF	(Portugal)	19	Mauro Cerqueira	1	0	0	0	1 (1)	0 (0)
DF	(Serbia)	21	Nemanja Antonov	4	0	0	0	4 (4)	0 (0)
MF	(Serbia)	22	Nikola Mitrović	3	0	0	0	3 (3)	0 (0)
MF	(Nigeria)	30	Vincent Onovo	4	0	0	0	4 (4)	0 (0)
FW	(Serbia)	45	Petar Gigić	3	0	0	0	3 (3)	0 (0)
FW	(Serbia)	49	Branko Pauljević	2	0	0	0	2 (2)	0 (0)
DF	(Hungary)	55	Péter Szakály	0	0	1	0	1 (0)	0 (0)
DF	(Bosnia and Herzegovina)	68	Dženan Bureković	0	1	0	0	0 (0)	1 (1)
FW	(Croatia)	77	Antonio Perošević	3	0	1	0	4 (3)	0 (0)
			TOTALS	39	3	2	0	41 (39)	3 (3)

=== Clean sheets ===
Last updated on 20 December 2020

Position	Nation	Number	Name	OTP Bank Liga	Hungarian Cup	Total
1	(Serbia)	1	Filip Pajović	1	1	2
2	(Hungary)	23	Dávid Banai	0	1	1
3	(Hungary)	99	Márk Németh	0	0	0
4	(Hungary)	34	Zoltán Tomori	0	0	0
			TOTALS	1	2	3
