= Dávid Banai =

Hungarian footballer (born 1994)

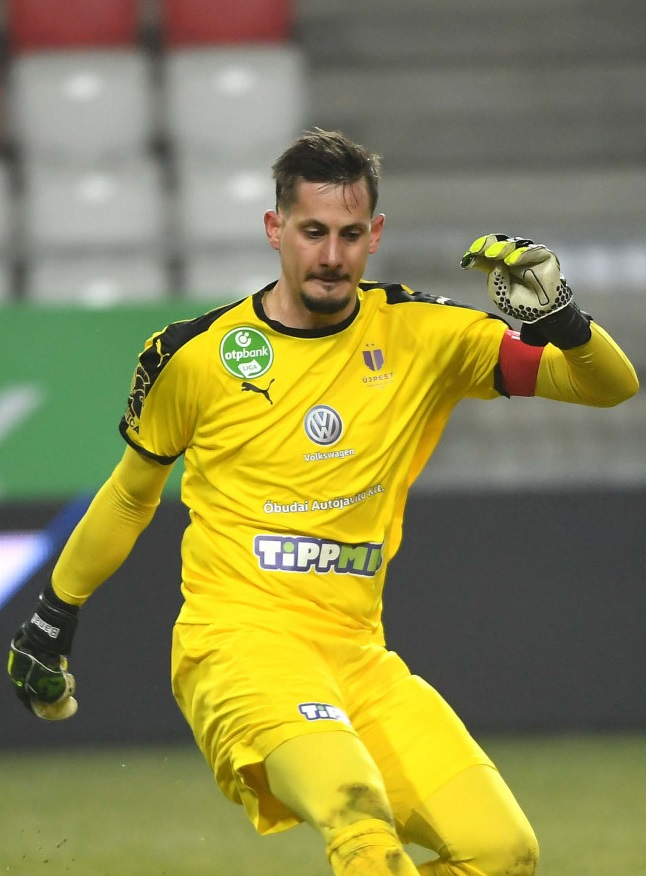
- Banai playing for Újpest in 2020

Personal information
- Date of birth: 9 May 1994 (age 32)
- Place of birth: Budapest, Hungary
- Height: 1.90 m (6 ft 3 in)
- Position: Goalkeeper

Team information
- Current team: Újpest
- Number: 23

Youth career
- –2014: Újpest

Senior career*
Years	Team	Apps	(Gls)
2011–2024	Újpest II	46	(1)
2011–	Újpest	152	(0)

International career
2010	Hungary U16	1	(0)
2010–2011	Hungary U17	6	(0)
2011	Hungary U18	2	(0)
2012	Hungary U19	4	(0)
2014	Hungary U20	1	(0)
2014–2016	Hungary U21	5	(0)
- * Club domestic league appearances and goals as of 30 May 2026

Dávid Banai (born 9 May 1994) is a Hungarian professional footballer who plays as a goalkeeper for Nemzeti Bajnokság I club Újpest.

== Career statistics ==
=== Club ===
As of match played 21 February 2026

Appearances and goals by club, season and competition
Club	Season	League			Magyar Kupa		Ligakupa		Europe		Total	
Club	Season	Division	Apps	Goals	Apps	Goals	Apps	Goals	Apps	Goals	Apps	Goals
Újpest II	2011–12	Nemzeti Bajnokság II	5	0	1	0	—		—		6	0
Újpest II	2012–13	Nemzeti Bajnokság II	9	0	—		—		—		9	0
Újpest II	2015–16	Nemzeti Bajnokság III	20	1	—		—		—		20	1
Újpest II	2016–17	Nemzeti Bajnokság III	5	0	—		—		—		5	0
Újpest II	2018–19	Megyei Bajnokság I	5	0	—		—		—		5	0
Újpest II	2024–25	Nemzeti Bajnokság III	2	0	—		—		—		2	0
Újpest II	Total		46	1	1	0	—		—		47	1
Újpest	2011–12	Nemzeti Bajnokság I	—		—		0	0	—		0	0
Újpest	2012–13	Nemzeti Bajnokság I	0	0	—		0	0	—		0	0
Újpest	2013–14	Nemzeti Bajnokság I	0	0	—		2	0	—		2	0
Újpest	2014–15	Nemzeti Bajnokság I	1	0	1	0	3	0	—		5	0
Újpest	2015–16	Nemzeti Bajnokság I	1	0	0	0	—		—		1	0
Újpest	2016–17	Nemzeti Bajnokság I	16	0	1	0	—		—		17	0
Újpest	2017–18	Nemzeti Bajnokság I	0	0	2	0	—		—		2	0
Újpest	2018–19	Nemzeti Bajnokság I	4	0	0	0	—		—		4	0
Újpest	2019–20	Nemzeti Bajnokság I	23	0	2	0	—		—		25	0
Újpest	2020–21	Nemzeti Bajnokság I	25	0	2	0	—		—		27	0
Újpest	2021–22	Nemzeti Bajnokság I	27	0	2	0	—		2 (Note: Appearances in UEFA Europa Conference League)	0	31	0
Újpest	2022–23	Nemzeti Bajnokság I	9	0	0	0	—		—		9	0
Újpest	2023–24	Nemzeti Bajnokság I	21	0	2	0	—		—		23	0
Újpest	2024–25	Nemzeti Bajnokság I	4	0	4	0	—		—		8	0
Újpest	2025–26	Nemzeti Bajnokság I	11	0	1	0	—		—		12	0
Újpest	Total		142	0	17	0	5	0	2	0	166	0
Career total			188	1	18	0	5	0	2	0	213	1

=== International ===
Appearances and goals by national team and year
Team	Year	Total	
Team	Year	Apps	Goals
Hungary U16	2010	1	0
Hungary U17	2010	1	0
Hungary U17	2011	5	0
Hungary U17	Total	6	0
Hungary U18	2011	2	0
Hungary U19	2012	4	0
Hungary U20	2014	1	0
Hungary U21	2014	1	0
Hungary U21	2015	2	0
Hungary U21	2016	2	0
Hungary U21	Total	5	0
Career total		19	0

== Honours ==
Újpest

- Magyar Kupa: 2017–18, 2020–21

Individual

- Nemzeti Bajnokság I Save of the Month: August 2023
