= Giorgi Beridze =

Georgian footballer (born 1997)

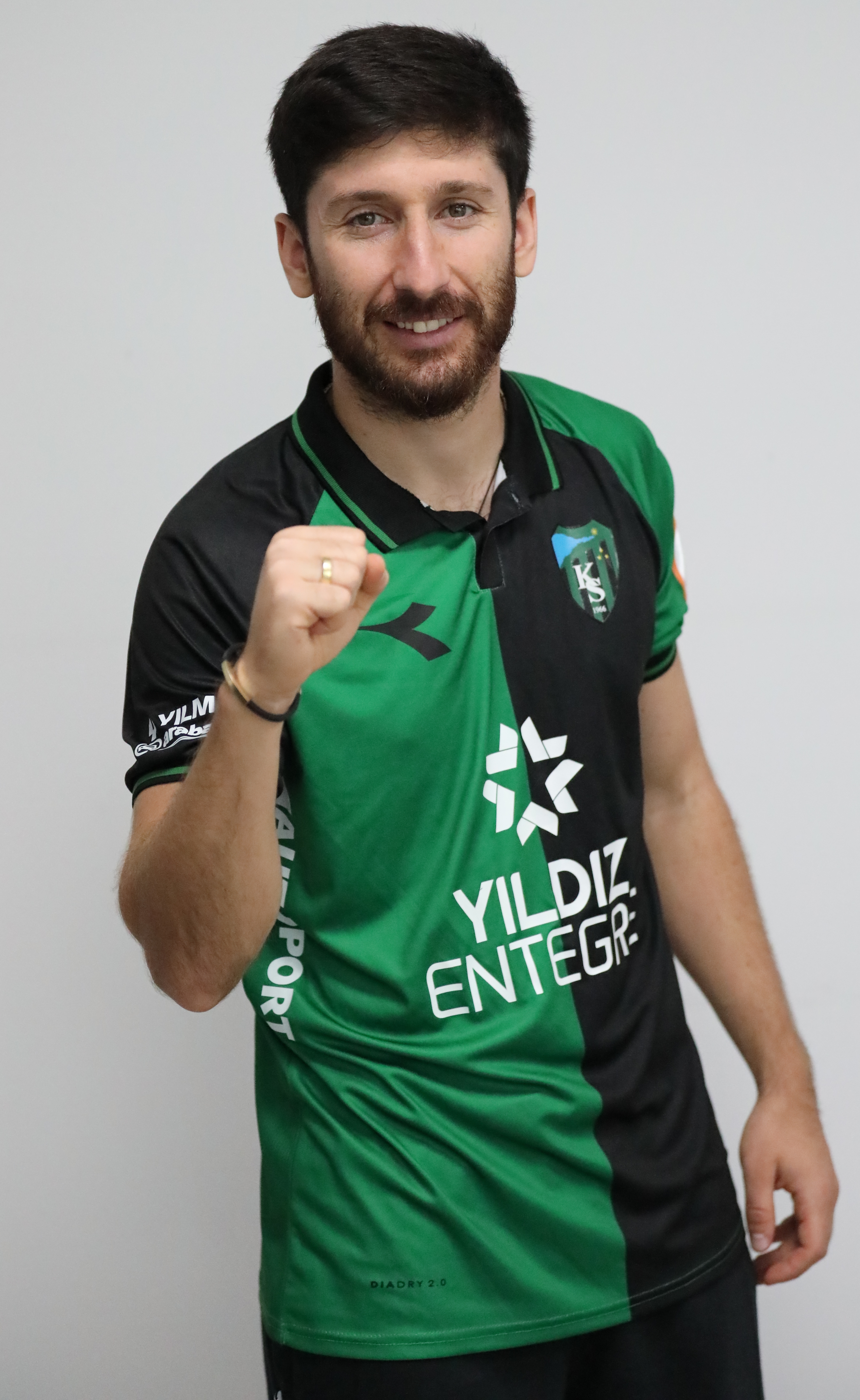
- Beridze with Kocaelispor in 2023

Personal information
- Date of birth: 12 May 1997 (age 29)
- Place of birth: Mestia, Georgia
- Height: 1.74 m (5 ft 9 in)
- Position: Winger

Team information
- Current team: Iberia 1999
- Number: 26

Youth career
- –2013: Zestaponi
- 2015–2017: Gent

Senior career*
Years	Team	Apps	(Gls)
2013–2014	Dila Gori II	16	(3)
2014–2015	Dila Gori	8	(0)
2015	Zestaponi	8	(0)
2015–2020	Gent	1	(0)
2017–2018	→ AS Trenčín (loan)	38	(9)
2018–2019	→ Újpest (loan)	27	(4)
2019–2020	→ Lokeren (loan)	20	(6)
2020–2022	Újpest	52	(18)
2022–2023	Ankaragücü	30	(4)
2023–2025	Kocaelispor	37	(7)
2025–2026	Újpest	37	(4)
2026–	Iberia 1999	2	(0)

International career^{‡}
2013–2014	Georgia U17	8	(1)
2014–2016	Georgia U19	21	(1)
2016–2018	Georgia U21	11	(1)
2018–2023	Georgia	8	(1)
- * Club domestic league appearances and goals as of 12 October 2026 ‡ National team caps and goals as of 28 March 2023

Giorgi Beridze (Georgian: გიორგი ბერიძე; born 12 May 1997) is a Georgian professional footballer who plays as a winger for Erovnuli Liga club Iberia 1999 and the Georgia national team.

== Club career ==
=== Gent ===
A youth product of Zestaponi, Beridze moved to Dila Gori in 2013 and made his professional debut on 2 May 2014 in a 2–1 loss to WIT Georgia in the Umaglesi Liga. He returned shortly to Zestaponi in 2015, before being signed by Belgian Pro League club Gent later that year where he joined the youth academy.

==== Loans ====
In January 2017, Beridze joined Slovak Super Liga club Trenčín on a six-month loan. He made his debut for the club against Slovan Bratislava on 25 February 2017 and netted the equalizer in the match. He extended his contract with Gent until 2020 during his loan, which was also extended by another season. His efforts for Trenčín meant that he was awarded the award as player of the season.

Another two loan spells followed between 2018 and 2020 to Újpest and Lokeren, respectively. He scored his first goal for Lokeren on 26 September 2019 in the first minute of the Belgian Cup match against Antwerp which ended in a 4–2 loss.

=== Újpest ===
On 1 October 2020, Beridze joined Újpest on a permanent deal after his contract with Gent had expired. He made his return debut on 4 October, coming off the bench for Zoltán Stieber in the 66th minute before scoring in injury time in a 5–1 loss to Fehérvár.

Beridze won the Magyar Kupa in his first season at the club, becoming top goalscorer of the tournament as well with six goals.

=== Ankaragücü ===
Beridze signed with Süper Lig club Ankaragücü on 28 May 2022, joining the club on a two-year deal with an option for an additional year. He scored his first goals for the club on 4 September, bagging a brace in a 3–2 home loss to Beşiktaş.

=== Kocaelispor ===
On 12 September 2023, Beridze penned a two-year contract with an option for an additional year with TFF First League club Kocaelispor. Just four days later, he made his debut for the team, showcasing an immediate impact by providing his first assist within three minutes of coming off the bench at half-time. This contribution led to a pivotal 2–1 home victory against Boluspor. On 6 October, Beridze scored his first competitive goal for Körfez in a 1–1 league draw against Erzurumspor FK.

=== Iberia 1999 ===
In September 2026, Beridze returned to Georgia to sign for the reigning champions Iberia 1999.

== International career ==
Beridze made his debut for Georgia national football team on 1 June 2018 in a friendly against Malta.

== Career statistics ==
=== Club ===
As of match played 11 October 2026

Appearances and goals by club, season and competition
Club	Season	League			Cup (Note: Includes Georgian Cup, Slovak Cup, Magyar Kupa, Belgian Cup)		Europe		Other		Total	
Club	Season	Division	Apps	Goals	Apps	Goals	Apps	Goals	Apps	Goals	Apps	Goals
Dila Gori	2013–14	Umaglesi Liga	3	0	0	0	—		—		3	0
Dila Gori	2014–15	Umaglesi Liga	5	0	1	0	—		—		6	0
Dila Gori	Total		8	0	1	0	—		—		9	0
Zestaponi	2014–15	Umaglesi Liga	8	0	0	0	—		—		8	0
Gent	2015–16	Pro League	0	0	0	0	0	0	—		0	0
Gent	2016–16	Pro League	0	0	0	0	0	0	—		0	0
Gent	2017–18	Pro League	0	0	0	0	0	0	—		0	0
Gent	2018–19	Pro League	0	0	0	0	0	0	—		0	0
Gent	2019–20	Pro League	1	0	0	0	1 (Note: Appearances in UEFA Europa League)	0	—		2	0
Gent	2020–21	Pro League	0	0	0	0	0	0	—		0	0
Gent	Total		1	0	0	0	1	0	—		2	0
Trenčín (loan)	2016–17	Super Liga	12	4	1	0	—		—		13	4
Trenčín (loan)	2017–18	Super Liga	26	5	1	0	4	2	2 (Note: Appearances in Slovak Super Liga European play-offs)	1	33	8
Trenčín (loan)	Total		38	9	2	0	4	2	2	1	46	12
Újpest (loan)	2018–19	NB I	27	4	3	1	0	0	—		30	5
Lokeren (loan)	2019–20	Pro League	20	6	1	1	—		—		21	7
Újpest	2020–21	NB I	25	10	7	6	—		—		32	16
Újpest	2021–22	NB I	27	8	5	3	2 (Note: Appearances in UEFA Europa Conference League)	1	—		34	12
Újpest	2024–25	NB I	2	0	1	1	—		—		3	1
Újpest	Total		54	18	13	10	2	1	—		69	29
Ankaragücü	2022–23	Süper Lig	29	4	2	0	—		—		31	4
Ankaragücü	2023–24	Süper Lig	1	0	0	0	—		—		1	0
Ankaragücü	Total		30	4	2	0	—		—		32	4
Kocaelispor	2023–24	1. Lig	9	2	0	0	—		—		9	2
2026	Erovnuli Liga	2	0	0	0	—		—		2	0	
Career total			197	43	22	12	7	3	2	1	228	59

=== International ===
As of match played 28 March 2023

Appearances and goals by national team and year
National team	Year	Apps	Goals
Georgia	2018	2	0
Georgia	2021	2	0
Georgia	2022	2	1
Georgia	2023	2	0
Total		8	1

== International goals ==
No.	Date	Venue	Opponent	Score	Result	Competition
1.	25 March 2023	Batumi Stadium, Batumi, Georgia	Mongolia	5–1	6–1	Friendly

== Honours ==
Újpest

- Magyar Kupa: 2020–21

Individual

- Magyar Kupa top goalscorer: 2020–21
