= Dániel Nagy (footballer, born 1991) =

Hungarian footballer

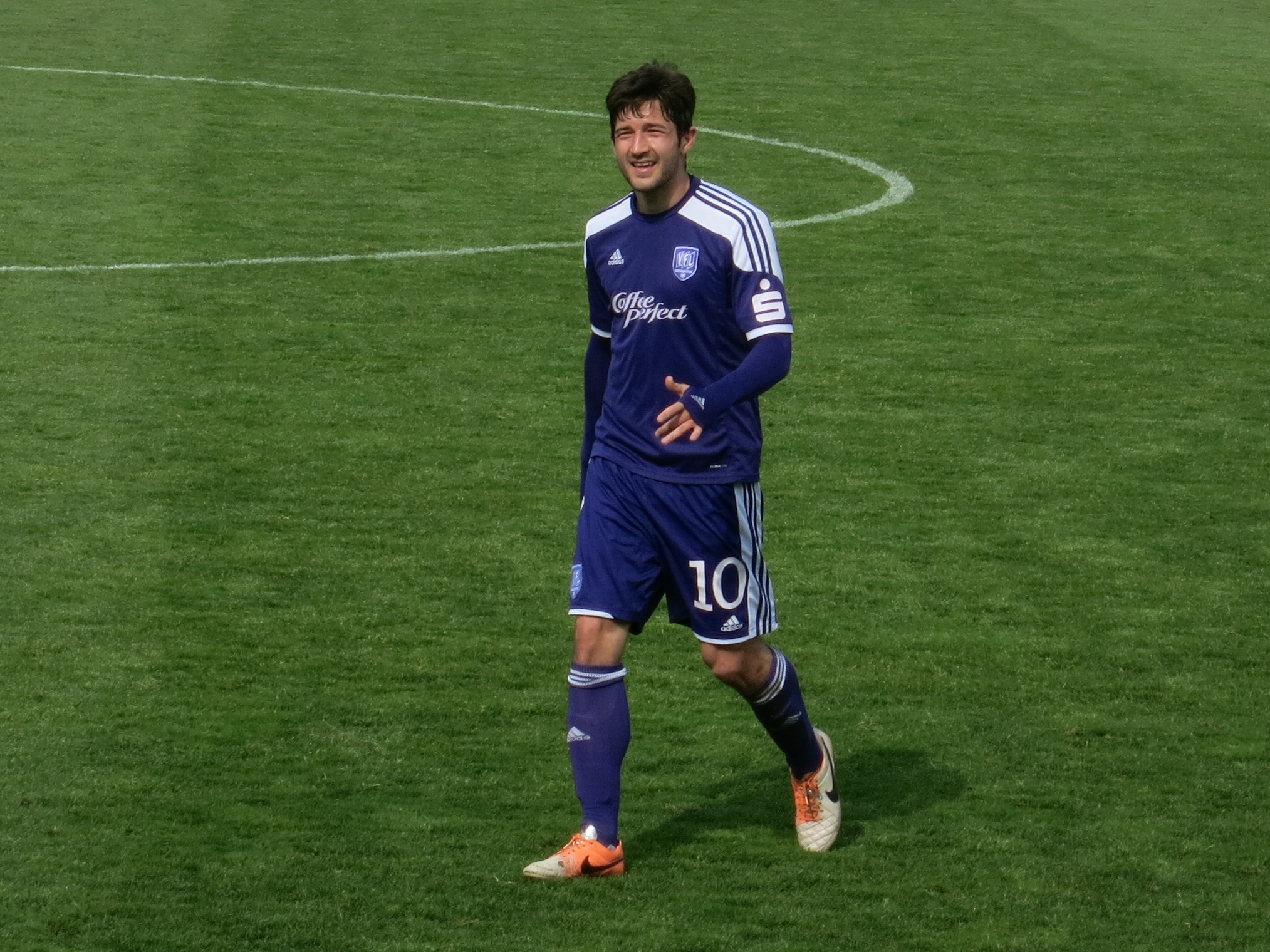
- Nagy playing for Osnabrück in 2014

Personal information
- Date of birth: 15 March 1991 (age 35)
- Place of birth: Budapest, Hungary
- Height: 1.81 m (5 ft 11 in)
- Position: Midfielder

Youth career
- 1996–2003: Gödöllő
- 2003–2007: Újpest
- 2007–2010: Hamburger SV

Senior career*
Years	Team	Apps	(Gls)
2008–2012	Hamburger SV II	66	(8)
2011–2012	Hamburger SV	0	(0)
2012–2014	VfL Osnabrück	65	(6)
2014–2015	Ferencváros	12	(1)
2015–2017	Würzburger Kickers	37	(0)
2017–2019	Újpest	52	(9)
2019–2022	Mezőkövesd	73	(8)

International career^{‡}
2007–2008	Hungary U-17	7	(0)
2011–2013	Hungary U-21	2	(0)
2017–	Hungary	2	(0)
- * Club domestic league appearances and goals as of 6 February 2022 ‡ National team caps and goals as of 14 November 2017

Dániel Nagy (born 15 March 1991) is a Hungarian football midfielder.

== Career ==
=== Hamburger SV ===
He was signed from Hungarian Újpest FC in 2007, In 2008, he signed a professional contract with Hamburger SV. He played mainly for the reserves, in the fourth division. In a friendly match, he made his debut in the first team and scored a goal in the summer of 2011. In 2012, Hamburg and Nagy have been cancelled his contract with mutual consent.

=== VfL Osnabrück ===
In the summer of 2012, Nagy signed for Osnasbrück in the third division. In his first season, he made 3 goals and 6 assist.

On 2 August 2013, he made his debut in the DFB-Pokal against second division-side Erzgebirge Aue, at an eventual 3–0 home win, where he scored two goals.

== Career statistics ==
As of match played 15 May 2021

Appearances and goals by club, season and competition
Club	Season	League			Cup		League Cup		Other		Total	
Club	Season	Division	Apps	Goals	Apps	Goals	Apps	Goals	Apps	Goals	Apps	Goals
Hamburger SV II	2008–09	Regionalliga Nord	6	0	—		—		—		6	0
Hamburger SV II	2009–10	Regionalliga Nord	0	0	—		—		—		0	0
Hamburger SV II	2010–11	Regionalliga Nord	28	3	—		—		—		28	3
Hamburger SV II	2011–12	Regionalliga Nord	32	5	—		—		—		32	5
Hamburger SV II	Total		66	8	0	0	0	0	0	0	66	8
VfL Osnabrück	2012–13	3. Liga	33	3	—		—		—		33	3
VfL Osnabrück	2013–14	3. Liga	32	3	2	2	—		—		34	5
VfL Osnabrück	Total		65	6	2	2	0	0	0	0	67	8
Ferencváros	2014–15	Nemzeti Bajnokság I	11	0	5	0	8	3	2 (Note: Appearance(s) in UEFA Europa League)	0	26	3
Würzburger Kickers	2015–16	3. Liga	24	0	1	0	—		1 (Note: Appearance(s) in 2. Bundesliga relegation play-offs)	1	26	1
Würzburger Kickers	2016–17	2. Bundesliga	13	0	0	0	—		—		13	0
Würzburger Kickers	Total		37	0	1	0	0	0	1	1	39	1
Újpest	2017–18	Nemzeti Bajnokság I	28	5	6	5	—		—		34	10
Újpest	2018–19	Nemzeti Bajnokság I	24	4	1	0	—		4 (Note: Appearance(s) in UEFA Europa League)	1	29	5
Újpest	Total		52	9	7	5	0	0	4	1	63	15
Mezőkövesd	2019–20	Nemzeti Bajnokság I	32	4	6	0	—		—		38	4
Mezőkövesd	2020–21	Nemzeti Bajnokság I	25	1	4	1	—		—		29	2
Mezőkövesd	Total		57	5	10	1	0	0	0	0	67	6
Career total			288	28	25	8	8	3	7	2	328	41
