= 2017–18 in Hungarian football =

Football in Hungary
- Season: 2017–18

The 2017–18 season was the 119th season of competitive association football in Hungary.

== National teams ==
=== Hungary national football team ===
==== 2018 FIFA World Cup qualification (UEFA) Group B ====
Pos	Team	Pld	W	D	L	GF	GA	GD	Pts	Qualification	Portugal	Switzerland	Hungary	Faroe Islands	Latvia	Andorra
1	Portugal	10	9	0	1	32	4	+28	27	Qualification to 2018 FIFA World Cup	—	2–0	3–0	5–1	4–1	6–0
2	Switzerland	10	9	0	1	23	7	+16	27	Advance to second round	2–0	—	5–2	2–0	1–0	3–0
3	Hungary	10	4	1	5	14	14	0	13		0–1	2–3	—	1–0	3–1	4–0
4	Faroe Islands	10	2	3	5	4	16	−12	9		0–6	0–2	0–0	—	0–0	1–0
5	Latvia	10	2	1	7	7	18	−11	7		0–3	0–3	0–2	0–2	—	4–0
6	Andorra	10	1	1	8	2	23	−21	4		0–2	1–2	1–0	0–0	0–1	—

Source: FIFA
Rules for classification: Qualification tiebreakers

2018 FIFA World Cup qualification tiebreakers
In league format, the ranking of teams in each group was based on the following criteria (regulations Articles 20.6 and 20.7):
1. Points (3 points for a win, 1 point for a draw, 0 points for a loss)
2. Overall goal difference
3. Overall goals scored
4. Points in matches between tied teams
5. Goal difference in matches between tied teams
6. Goals scored in matches between tied teams
7. Away goals scored in matches between tied teams (if the tie was only between two teams in home-and-away league format)
8. Fair play points
  - first yellow card: minus 1 point
  - indirect red card (second yellow card): minus 3 points
  - direct red card: minus 4 points
  - yellow card and direct red card: minus 5 points
9. Drawing of lots by the FIFA Organising Committee

== UEFA competitions ==
=== 2017–18 UEFA Champions League ===
==== Second qualifying round ====
Team 1	Agg.	Team 2	1st leg	2nd leg
Hapoel Be'er Sheva (Israel)	5–3	(Hungary) Budapest Honvéd	2–1	3–2

=== 2017–18 UEFA Europa League ===
==== Qualifying rounds ====
===== First qualifying round =====
Team 1	Agg.	Team 2	1st leg	2nd leg
Beitar Jerusalem (Israel)	7–3	(Hungary) Vasas	4–3	3–0
Videoton (Hungary)	5–3	(Malta) Balzan	2–0	3–3
Ferencváros (Hungary)	3–0	(Latvia) FK Jelgava	2–0	1–0

===== Second qualifying round =====
Team 1	Agg.	Team 2	1st leg	2nd leg
Nõmme Kalju (Estonia)	1–4	(Hungary) Videoton	0–3	1–1
Ferencváros (Hungary)	3–7	(Denmark) Midtjylland	2–4	1–3
