= Răzvan Horj =

Romanian footballer

Personal information
- Date of birth: 17 December 1995 (age 30)
- Place of birth: Moisei, Romania
- Height: 1.89 m (6 ft 2 in)
- Position: Defender

Team information
- Current team: Bizonii recea cristur

Youth career
- 2006–2011: Zorile Moisei
- 2011–2013: FCM Baia Mare
- 2013–2015: CFR Cluj

Senior career*
Years	Team	Apps	(Gls)
2013–2017	CFR Cluj	26	(0)
2013–2014	→ FCM Baia Mare (loan)		
2014–2015	→ Pandurii II Târgu Jiu (loan)		
2017–2018	Viitorul Constanța	11	(0)
2018	→ Voluntari (loan)	10	(0)
2018–2019	Újpest	2	(1)
2019–2020	CFR Cluj	0	(0)
2019–2020	CFR II Cluj	13	(1)
2020	→ Universitatea Cluj (loan)	1	(0)
2020–2022	Gaz Metan Mediaș	15	(0)
2022–2023	Petrolul Ploiești	0	(0)
2023–	Minaur Baia Mare	2	(0)
- * Club domestic league appearances and goals as of 1 June 2023

Răzvan Horj (born 17 December 1995) is a Romanian professional footballer who plays as a defender for Liga II side Minaur Baia Mare.

== Honours ==
CFR Cluj

- Liga I: 2018–19

Petrolul Ploiești

- Liga II: 2021–22
