= Bence Pávkovics =

Hungarian footballer

Personal information
- Full name: Gábor Bence Pávkovics
- Date of birth: 27 March 1997 (age 29)
- Place of birth: Mohács, Hungary
- Height: 1.86 m (6 ft 1 in)
- Position: Midfielder

Team information
- Current team: Vasas
- Number: 4

Youth career
- 2008–2011: Pécs
- 2011–2014: MTK Budapest

Senior career*
Years	Team	Apps	(Gls)
2014–2015	Pécs	1	(0)
2015–2017	Újpest II	37	(5)
2016–2019	Újpest	35	(1)
2018–2019	→ Debrecen (loan)	10	(1)
2019–2022	Debrecen	91	(5)
2023	El Paso Locomotive	21	(0)
2023–	Vasas	59	(3)

International career^{‡}
2014–2015	Hungary U-17	2	(2)
2016–2017	Hungary U-19	3	(0)
2018	Hungary U-21	1	(0)
- * Club domestic league appearances and goals as of 31 May 2026 ‡ National team caps and goals as of 11 September 2018

Bence Pávkovics (born 27 March 1997) is a Hungarian football player who currently plays for Vasas in the Nemzeti Bajnokság II.

== Career ==
=== Újpest ===
On 16 July 2016, Pávkovics played his first match for Újpest in a 0–2 loss against Budapest Honvéd in the Hungarian League.

=== El Paso Locomotive ===
Pávkovics signed with USL Championship club El Paso Locomotive on 27 January 2023.

=== Vasas ===
Pávkovics returned to Hungary in August 2023, signing with Vasas. The transfer fee was El Paso's largest of the 2023 USL Championship season.

== Club statistics ==
As of match played 13 May 2023

Appearances and goals by club, season and competition
Club	Season	League			Cup		League Cup		Europe		Total	
Club	Season	Division	Apps	Goals	Apps	Goals	Apps	Goals	Apps	Goals	Apps	Goals
Pécs	2014–15	Nemzeti Bajnokság I	1	0	1	0	2	0	–	–	4	0
Pécs	Total		1	0	1	0	2	0	–	–	4	0
Újpest II	2015–16	Nemzeti Bajnokság III	26	4	–	–	–	–	–	–	26	4
Újpest II	2016–17	Nemzeti Bajnokság III	11	1	–	–	–	–	–	–	11	1
Újpest II	Total		37	5	–	–	–	–	–	–	37	5
Újpest	2015–16	Nemzeti Bajnokság I	0	0	1	0	–	–	–	–	1	0
Újpest	2016–17	Nemzeti Bajnokság I	22	0	5	0	–	–	–	–	27	0
Újpest	2017–18	Nemzeti Bajnokság I	13	1	1	1	–	–	–	–	14	2
Újpest	Total		35	1	7	1	–	–	–	–	42	2
Debrecen	2018–19	Nemzeti Bajnokság I	24	2	8	0	–	–	–	–	32	2
Debrecen	2019–20	Nemzeti Bajnokság I	30	1	2	0	–	–	4	0	36	1
Debrecen	2020–21	Nemzeti Bajnokság I	27	1	4	1	–	–	–	–	31	2
Debrecen	2021–22	Nemzeti Bajnokság I	19	2	0	0	–	–	–	–	19	2
Debrecen	Total		100	6	14	1	–	–	4	0	118	7
El Paso Locomotive	2023	USL Championship	20	0	0	0	–	–	–	–	20	0
Career total			193	12	22	2	2	0	4	0	221	14
