= Bojan Sanković =

Serbian footballer (born 1993)

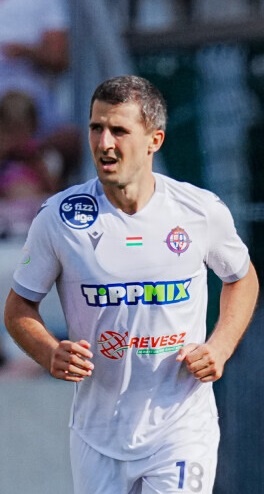
- Sanković playing for Nyíregyháza in 2025

Personal information
- Full name: Bojan Sanković
- Date of birth: 21 November 1993 (age 32)
- Place of birth: Knin, Croatia
- Height: 1.77 m (5 ft 10 in)
- Position: Midfielder

Team information
- Current team: Nyíregyháza
- Number: 18

Youth career
- 2007–2012: Mladost Podgorica

Senior career*
| Years | Team | Apps | (Gls) |
| 2012–2013 | Mladost Podgorica | 28 | (0) |
| 2013–2020 | Újpest | 132 | (2) |
| 2020 | Irtysh Pavlodar | 2 | (0) |
| 2020–2025 | Zalaegerszeg | 145 | (0) |
| 2025– | Nyíregyháza | 13 | (0) |
- * Club domestic league appearances and goals as of 19 January 2026

Bojan Sanković (Serbian Cyrillic: Бојан Санковић; born 21 November 1993) is a Serbian professional footballer who plays for Hungarian Nemzeti Bajnokság I club Nyíregyháza.

== Playing career ==
=== Club ===
On 6 January 2020, Újpest FC confirmed that Sanković had left the club to join FC Irtysh Pavlodar, with the deal being confirmed on 11 January 2020.

== Career statistics ==
=== Club ===
As of match played 14 March 2020

Appearances and goals by club, season and competition
| Club | Season | League | | | National Cup | | League Cup | | Continental | | Other | | Total | |
| Club | Season | Division | Apps | Goals | Apps | Goals | Apps | Goals | Apps | Goals | Apps | Goals | Apps | Goals |
|---|---|---|---|---|---|---|---|---|---|---|---|---|---|---|
| Mladost Podgorica | 2012–13 | Montenegrin First League | 28 | 0 | 4 | 0 | - | | | | | | 32 | 0 |
| Mladost Podgorica | 2013–14 | Montenegrin First League | 0 | 0 | 0 | 0 | - | | 5 | 0 | - | | 0 | 0 |
| Mladost Podgorica | Total | | 28 | 0 | 4 | 0 | 0 | 0 | 5 | 0 | - | - | 37 | 0 |
| Újpest | 2013–14 | Nemzeti Bajnokság I | 17 | 0 | 5 | 1 | 4 | 0 | - | | | | 26 | 1 |
| Újpest | 2014–15 | Nemzeti Bajnokság I | 4 | 0 | 1 | 0 | 1 | 0 | - | | | | 6 | 0 |
| Újpest | 2015–16 | Nemzeti Bajnokság I | 23 | 1 | 8 | 0 | - | | | | | | 31 | 1 |
| Újpest | 2016–17 | Nemzeti Bajnokság I | 16 | 0 | 4 | 0 | - | | | | | | 20 | 0 |
| Újpest | 2017–18 | Nemzeti Bajnokság I | 25 | 0 | 8 | 0 | - | | | | | | 33 | 0 |
| Újpest | 2018–19 | Nemzeti Bajnokság I | 31 | 0 | 1 | 0 | - | | 4 | 1 | - | | 36 | 1 |
| Újpest | 2019–20 | Nemzeti Bajnokság I | 16 | 1 | 2 | 0 | — | | | | | | 18 | 1 |
| Újpest | Total | | 132 | 2 | 29 | 1 | 5 | 0 | 4 | 1 | - | - | 170 | 4 |
| Irtysh Pavlodar | 2020 | Kazakhstan Premier League | 2 | 0 | 0 | 0 | — | | | | | | 2 | 0 |
| Career total | | | 162 | 2 | 33 | 1 | 5 | 0 | 9 | 1 | - | - | 209 | 4 |

== Honours ==
Újpest

- Hungarian Cup (1): 2013–14
