= Rosy Lubaki =

Congolese footballer

Personal information
- Full name: Rossy Lubaki Kinkela
- Date of birth: 10 February 1998 (age 28)
- Place of birth: Congo DR
- Height: 1.75 m (5 ft 9 in)
- Position: Forward

Team information
- Current team: Újpest II

Youth career
- –2018: Sanga Balende

Senior career*
Years	Team	Apps	(Gls)
2018–2020	Újpest	1	(0)
2020–	Újpest II	0	(0)
- * Club domestic league appearances and goals as of 19 May 2019

Rosy Lubaki (born 10 February 1998) is a Congolese football player who plays for Hungarian club Újpest II.

== Career ==
=== Újpest ===
On 10 November 2018, Lubaki played his first match for Újpest in a 4–1 win against Kisvárda in the Hungarian League.

== Club statistics ==
Club	Season	League		Cup		Europe		Total	
Club	Season	Apps	Goals	Apps	Goals	Apps	Goals	Apps	Goals
Újpest
Újpest	2018–19	1	0	0	0	0	0	1	0
Újpest	Total	1	0	0	0	0	0	1	0
Career Total		1	0	0	0	0	0	1	0

Updated to games played as of 19 May 2019.
