= Róbert Litauszki =

Hungarian footballer

Personal information
- Date of birth: 15 March 1990 (age 36)
- Place of birth: Budapest, Hungary
- Height: 1.87 m (6 ft 1 1/2 in)
- Position: Defender

Team information
- Current team: Vasas
- Number: 5

Youth career
- 2003–2004: Dunaújváros
- 2004: MTK
- 2004–2010: Újpest

Senior career*
Years	Team	Apps	(Gls)
2007–2013	Újpest II	79	(8)
2010–2016	Újpest	97	(5)
2016–2017	Cracovia	3	(0)
2017–2020	Újpest	65	(3)
2020–2024	Vasas	53	(4)

International career
2011–2012	Hungary U21	4	(0)
- * Club domestic league appearances and goals as of 29 September 2024

Róbert Litauszki (born 15 March 1990) is a Hungarian professional footballer who plays as a defender. He is currently a free agent.

== Career ==
After signing for Vasas in 2020, Litauszki was released on 16 June 2024. During this four season, he scored 6 goals in 62 matches in all competition.

== Career statistics ==
Appearances and goals by club, season and competition
Club	Season	League			Cup		League Cup		Europe		Total	
Club	Season	Division	Apps	Goals	Apps	Goals	Apps	Goals	Apps	Goals	Apps	Goals
Újpest II
Újpest II	2007–08	Nemzeti Bajnokság III	9	0	—		—		—		9	0
Újpest II	2008–09	Nemzeti Bajnokság III	18	1	—		—		—		18	1
Újpest II	2009–10	Nemzeti Bajnokság III	14	5	2	0	—		—		16	5
Újpest II	2010–11	Nemzeti Bajnokság II	19	1	—		—		—		19	1
Újpest II	2011–12	Nemzeti Bajnokság II	1	0	—		—		—		1	0
Újpest II	2012–13	Nemzeti Bajnokság II	18	1	—		—		—		18	1
Újpest II	Total		79	8	2	0	—		—		81	8
Cracovia	2016–17	Ekstraklasa	3	0	1	0	—		1	0	5	0
Újpest
Újpest	2007–08	Nemzeti Bajnokság I	0	0	0	0	1	0	—		1	0
Újpest	2008–09	Nemzeti Bajnokság I	0	0	2	0	5	0	—		7	0
Újpest	2009–10	Nemzeti Bajnokság I	0	0	1	0	2	0	—		3	0
Újpest	2010–11	Nemzeti Bajnokság I	4	0	2	0	2	1	—		8	1
Újpest	2011–12	Nemzeti Bajnokság I	11	0	4	0	0	0	—		15	0
Újpest	2012–13	Nemzeti Bajnokság I	2	0	0	0	2	0	—		4	0
Újpest	2013–14	Nemzeti Bajnokság I	21	2	7	1	6	0	—		34	3
Újpest	2014–15	Nemzeti Bajnokság I	29	2	6	2	4	0	—		39	4
Újpest	2015–16	Nemzeti Bajnokság I	30	1	7	0	—		—		37	1
Újpest	2017–18	Nemzeti Bajnokság I	31	1	7	0	—		—		38	1
Újpest	2018–19	Nemzeti Bajnokság I	23	1	2	0	—		4	1	29	2
Újpest	2019–20	Nemzeti Bajnokság I	11	1	3	0	—		—		14	1
Újpest	Total		162	8	41	3	22	1	4	1	229	13
Career total			244	16	44	3	22	1	5	1	315	21

Updated to games played as of 14 March 2020.

== Honours ==
Újpest

- Magyar Kupa: 2013–14, 2017–18
- Szuperkupa: 2014
