= Mijuško Bojović =

Montenegrin footballer (born 1988)

Personal information
- Full name: Mijuško Bojović
- Date of birth: 9 August 1988 (age 38)
- Place of birth: Pljevlja, SFR Yugoslavia
- Height: 1.91 m (6 ft 3 in)
- Position: Centre back

Senior career*
Years	Team	Apps	(Gls)
2006–2010	Rudar Pljevlja	45	(2)
2011–2013	Charleroi	55	(5)
2013–2015	Waasland-Beveren	34	(2)
2015–2016	Enosis Neon Paralimni	19	(5)
2016–2017	Gyirmót	22	(3)
2017–2019	Újpest	37	(0)
2019–2021	Keşla	38	(2)
2022–2023	Inđija	35	(1)

International career
2009–2010	Montenegro U21	10	(1)
- * Club domestic league appearances and goals as of 8 June 2023

Mijuško Bojović (born 9 August 1988) is a Montenegrin professional footballer who plays as a defender.

== Club statistics ==
Club	Season	League		Cup		Europe		Total	
Club	Season	Apps	Goals	Apps	Goals	Apps	Goals	Apps	Goals
Rudar Pljevlja	2009–10	31	1	0	0	–	–	31	1
Rudar Pljevlja	2010–11	14	1	2	0	3	0	19	1
Rudar Pljevlja	Total	45	2	2	0	3	0	50	2
Charleroi	2010–11	2	0	0	0	–	–	2	0
Charleroi	2011–12	28	3	0	0	–	–	28	3
Charleroi	2012–13	25	2	0	0	–	–	25	2
Charleroi	Total	55	5	0	0	–	–	55	5
Beveren	2013–14	27	1	2	0	–	–	29	1
Beveren	2014–15	7	1	0	0	–	–	7	1
Beveren	Total	34	2	2	0	–	–	36	2
Enosis Neon Paralimni	2015–16	19	5	0	0	–	–	19	5
Enosis Neon Paralimni	Total	19	5	0	0	–	–	19	5
Gyirmót	2016–17	22	3	1	0	–	–	23	3
Gyirmót	Total	22	3	1	0	–	–	23	3
Újpest	2017–18	18	0	9	2	–	–	27	2
Újpest	2018–19	19	0	2	2	4	0	25	2
Újpest	Total	37	0	11	4	4	0	52	4
Career total		212	17	16	4	7	0	235	21
