= Alassane Diallo (Malian footballer) =

Malian footballer (born 1995)

Personal information
- Date of birth: 19 February 1995 (age 31)
- Place of birth: Bamako, Mali
- Height: 1.76 m (5 ft 9 in)
- Position: Midfielder

Youth career
- Aspire Academy

Senior career*
Years	Team	Apps	(Gls)
2013–2014	K.A.S. Eupen	36	(3)
2014–2017	Standard Liège	0	(0)
2014–2015	→ K.V.C. Westerlo (loan)	7	(0)
2017–2019	Újpest	26	(2)
2020–2021	FC 93	2	(0)

International career
2015	Mali U-20	2	(0)
- * Club domestic league appearances and goals as of 12 September 2020

Alassane Diallo (born 19 February 1995) is a Malian football player who plays as a midfielder.

== Club career ==
Diallo signed with Standard Liège in 2014, joining from K.A.S. Eupen. Previously he has been formed with the Aspire Academy in Qatar. Then K.V.C. Westerlo signed Diallo on a one-year loan deal. He made his Belgian Pro League debut with Westerlo at 19 October 2014 against K.R.C. Genk in a 3–1 away defeat. He replaced Christian Dorda after 86 minutes.

== Club statistics ==
Club	Season	League		Cup		Europe		Total	
Club	Season	Apps	Goals	Apps	Goals	Apps	Goals	Apps	Goals
Eupen
Eupen	2012–13	5	1	0	0	–	–	5	1
Eupen	2013–14	31	2	2	1	–	–	33	3
Eupen	Total	36	3	2	1	–	–	38	4
Westerlo
Westerlo	2014–15	7	0	0	0	–	–	7	0
Westerlo	Total	7	0	0	0	–	–	7	0
Újpest
Újpest	2017–18	11	0	8	0	–	–	18	0
Újpest	2018–19	15	2	2	0	3	0	20	2
Újpest	Total	26	2	10	0	3	0	39	2
Career Total		69	5	12	1	3	0	84	6

Updated to games played as of 19 May 2019.
