= Kristóf Szűcs =

Hungarian footballer

Personal information
- Date of birth: 3 January 1997 (age 29)
- Place of birth: Szeged, Hungary
- Height: 1.82 m (6 ft 0 in)
- Position: Right back

Team information
- Current team: Karcagi SE
- Number: 92

Youth career
- 2005–2008: Kiskunhalasi FC
- 2008–2010: Kiskunmajsai FC
- 2010–2015: Budapest Honvéd
- 2015–2016: Újpest B

Senior career*
Years	Team	Apps	(Gls)
2015–2020	Újpest II	68	(7)
2017–2022	Újpest	21	(1)
2019–2020	→ Vác (loan)	26	(0)
2020–2022	→ Ajka (loan)	41	(0)
2022–2024	Ajka	30	(0)
2024-	Karcag	57	(0)
- * Club domestic league appearances and goals as of 31 May 2026

Kristóf Szűcs (born 3 January 1997) is a Hungarian footballer who plays as a right back for Karcag.

== Career ==
Szucs played at the academy for Budapest Honved before moving to the academy at city neighbours Ujpest. On February 26, 2017, Szűcs made his Hungarian League debut for Újpest FC coming on as a substitute and scoring in the 90th minute against Szombathelyi Haladás. With Ujpest he won the 2017–18 Magyar Kupa beating Puskás Akadémia FC in the Groupama Arena, Budapest, on penalties after a 2–2 draw. In 2019 he went on loan to Vác FC to gain experience in the division below, and then a further loan followed in 2020 to FC Ajka. A third season on loan at Ajka in the Hungarian National Championship II was confirmed in 2022.

In the summer of 2024 he signed for Karcagi SE.

== Career statistics ==
Appearances and goals by club, season and competition
Club	Season	League		Cup		Europe		Total	
Club	Season	Apps	Goals	Apps	Goals	Apps	Goals	Apps	Goals
Honvéd II
Honvéd II	2013–14	1	0	0	0	–	–	1	0
Honvéd II	2014–15	2	0	0	0	–	–	2	0
Honvéd II	Total	3	0	0	0	–	–	3	0
Újpest II
Újpest II	2015–16	11	0	0	0	–	–	11	0
Újpest II	2016–17	24	0	0	0	–	–	24	0
Újpest II	2017–18	13	4	0	0	–	–	13	4
Újpest II	2018–19	20	3	0	0	–	–	20	3
Újpest II	Total	68	7	0	0	–	–	68	7
Újpest
Újpest	2016–17	8	1	3	0	–	–	11	1
Újpest	2017–18	10	0	3	0	–	–	13	0
Újpest	2018–19	3	0	0	0	2	0	5	0
Újpest	Total	21	1	6	0	2	0	28	1
Career total		92	8	6	0	2	0	99	8

Updated to games played as of 19 May 2019.
