= Zsolt Máté =

Hungarian footballer

Personal information
- Date of birth: 14 September 1997 (age 29)
- Place of birth: Szabadszállás, Hungary
- Height: 1.85 m (6 ft 1 in)
- Position: Centre-back

Team information
- Current team: Tiszakécske
- Number: 5

Youth career
- 2008–2014: Kecskemét
- 2014–2015: Budapest Honvéd

Senior career*
Years	Team	Apps	(Gls)
2015–2017	Budapest Honvéd II	27	(1)
2017–2022	Újpest II	68	(15)
2020–2022	Újpest	16	(2)
2022	→ Tiszakécske (loan)	17	(0)
2022–	Tiszakécske	35	(0)
- * Club domestic league appearances and goals as of 21 December 2023

Zsolt Máté (born 14 September 1997) is a Hungarian footballer who plays as a defender for Tiszakécske.

== Career statistics ==
As of 27 June 2020

Appearances and goals by club, season and competition
Club	Season	League			Cup		Continental		Other		Total	
Club	Season	Division	Apps	Goals	Apps	Goals	Apps	Goals	Apps	Goals	Apps	Goals
Budapest Honvéd II	2015–16	Nemzeti Bajnokság III	7	1	—		—		—		7	1
Budapest Honvéd II	2016–17	Nemzeti Bajnokság III	20	0	—		—		—		20	0
Budapest Honvéd II	Total		27	1	0	0	0	0	0	0	27	1
Újpest II	2017–18	Megyei Bajnokság I	26	8	—		—		—		26	8
Újpest II	2018–19	Megyei Bajnokság I	29	4	—		—		—		29	4
Újpest II	2019–20	Megyei Bajnokság I	13	3	—		—		—		13	3
Újpest II	Total		68	15	0	0	0	0	0	0	68	15
Újpest	2019–20	Nemzeti Bajnokság I	3	1	0	0	0	0	—		3	1
Újpest	Total		3	1	0	0	0	0	0	0	3	1
Career total			98	17	0	0	0	0	0	0	98	17
