= Kire Ristevski =

Macedonian footballer

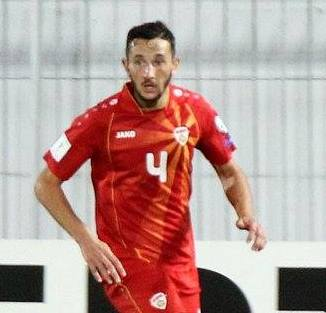
- Ristevski with North Macedonia in 2017

Personal information
- Full name: Kire Ristevski; Кире Ристевски
- Date of birth: 22 October 1990 (age 36)
- Place of birth: Bitola, SR Macedonia, SFRY
- Height: 1.88 m (6 ft 2 in)
- Position: Centre-back

Team information
- Current team: Pelister (on loan from Struga)
- Number: 24

Senior career*
Years	Team	Apps	(Gls)
2008–2010	Pelister	51	(0)
2010–2011	Elbasani	11	(1)
2011–2013	Bylis Ballsh	78	(2)
2014	Slavia Sofia	27	(2)
2015	Tirana	13	(0)
2015–2016	Rabotnički	17	(0)
2016–2018	Vasas	68	(3)
2018–2021	Újpest	62	(3)
2021–2022	AEL Limassol	11	(0)
2022–2023	Pyunik	12	(0)
2023–2024	Ethnikos Achna	30	(3)
2024–	Struga	10	(0)
2025	→ Makedonija GP (loan)	3	(0)
2026–	→ Pelister (loan)	14	(0)

International career^{‡}
2007–2008	Macedonia U-17	2	(0)
2008–2009	Macedonia U-19	3	(0)
2010–2012	Macedonia U-21	22	(0)
2014–2023	North Macedonia	59	(0)
- * Club domestic league appearances and goals as of 25 May 2026 ‡ National team caps and goals as of 2 April 2023

Kire Ristevski (Macedonian: Кире Ристевски; born 22 October 1990) is a Macedonian professional footballer who plays as a defender for Pelister, on loan from Struga. A former North Macedonia international, he played at UEFA Euro 2020.

== Club career ==
=== Slavia Sofia ===
Ristevski signed with Slavia Sofia on 27 December 2013 on a two-year deal.

=== KF Tirana ===
In January 2015, Ristevski returned to Albania by signing a contract with KF Tirana, after also attracting interest from Macedonian clubs Pelister and Shkëndija. He made his debut with the club on 8 February 2015 during the league match against Vllaznia Shkodër, helping the team to win the match 1–0. He made 13 league appearances during the second part of 2014–15 season, as Tirana finished the league in fourth place as well as being eliminated in the semi-finals of 2014–15 Albanian Cup against KF Laçi with a 1–0 aggregate score. Ristevski left the team after the end of the 2014–15 season, after claiming that he was not paid by the club during his six-month stay.

=== Rabotnički ===
During the 2015 summer transfer window, Ristevski signed with Macedonian side Rabotnički.

=== Pyunik ===
On 13 September 2022, Pyunik announced the signing of Ristevski. On 16 June 2023, Pyunik confirmed the departure of Ristevski.

== International career ==
He made his international debut for Macedonia on 5 March 2014, playing the last 13 minutes of a 2–1 friendly win against Latvia in Skopje. Across his career, he won 59 caps, scoring no goals.

Ristevski was part of the North Macedonia squad in 2021's delayed UEFA Euro 2020. He played in his nation's second group match, a 2–1 loss against Ukraine, as a substitute.
