= Benjamin Balázs =

Hungarian footballer

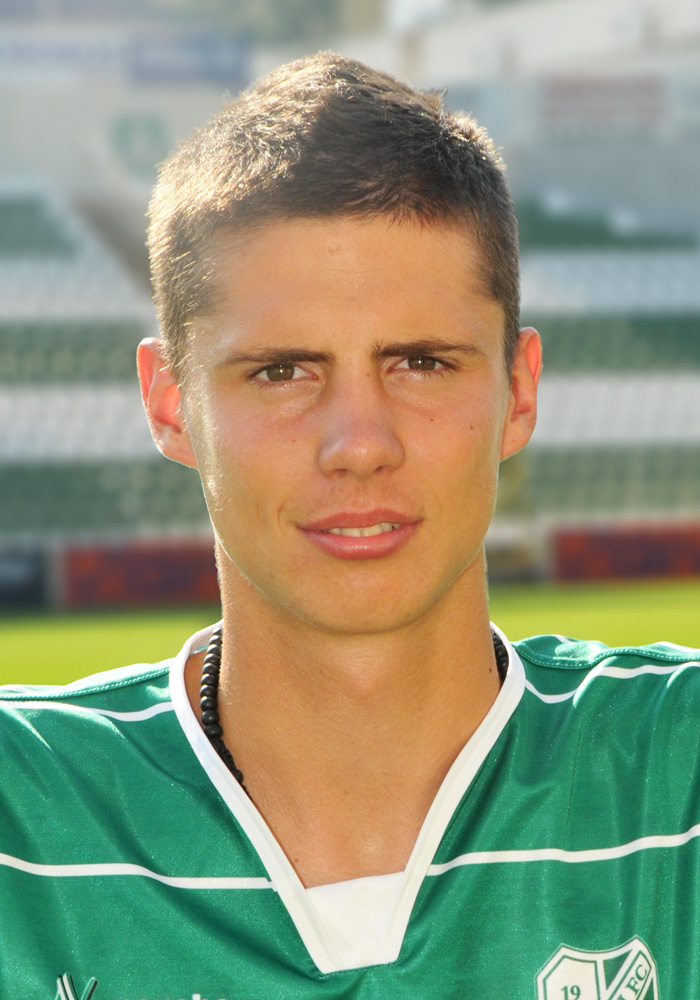

Personal information
- Date of birth: 26 April 1990 (age 36)
- Place of birth: Kaposvár, Hungary
- Height: 1.78 m (5 ft 10 in)
- Position: Midfielder

Team information
- Current team: Tiszakécske
- Number: 11

Youth career
- 2004–2009: Kaposvár

Senior career*
Years	Team	Apps	(Gls)
2009–2014	Kaposvár	141	(10)
2014–2015	Guimarães	0	(0)
2014–2015	→ Guimarães B	3	(0)
2015	Teplice	7	(0)
2015–2020	Újpest	114	(5)
2016–2017	→ Újpest B	9	(3)
2020–2022	MTK Budapest	31	(0)
2022–	Tiszakécske	130	(8)

International career^{‡}
2010–2012	Hungary U-21	14	(2)
- * Club domestic league appearances and goals as of 31 May 2026 ‡ National team caps and goals as of 10 September 2012

Benjamin Balázs (born 26 April 1990) is a Hungarian footballer who plays for Tiszakécske.

== Career ==
=== Vitória ===
On 3 July 2014, Balázs was signed by the Portuguese Primeira Liga club, Vitória S.C. In an interview with Nemzeti Sport, Balázs admitted that Videoton FC manager José Gomes suggested the signing of him.

=== Tiszakécske ===
On 20 January 2022, Balázs signed with Tiszakécske.

== Career statistics ==
Appearances and goals by club, season and competition
Club	Season	League			Cup		League Cup		Europe		Total	
Club	Season	Division	Apps	Goals	Apps	Goals	Apps	Goals	Apps	Goals	Apps	Goals
Kaposvár
Kaposvár	2008–09	Nemzeti Bajnokság I	0	0	2	0	3	0	0	0	5	0
Kaposvár	2009–10	Nemzeti Bajnokság I	24	0	4	1	6	0	0	0	34	1
Kaposvár	2010–11	Nemzeti Bajnokság I	30	1	7	1	2	0	0	0	39	2
Kaposvár	2011–12	Nemzeti Bajnokság I	27	3	5	0	1	0	0	0	33	3
Kaposvár	2012–13	Nemzeti Bajnokság I	30	4	2	0	1	0	0	0	33	4
Kaposvár	2013–14	Nemzeti Bajnokság I	30	2	1	1	2	1	0	0	33	4
Kaposvár	Total		141	10	21	3	15	1	0	0	177	14
Vitória	2014–15	Segunda Liga	3	0	0	0	—		—		3	0
Teplice
Teplice	2014–15	Czech First League	6	0	3	2	—		—		9	2
Teplice	2015–16	Czech First League	1	0	0	0	—		—		1	0
Teplice	Total		7	0	3	2	—		—		10	2
Újpest
Újpest	2015–16	Nemzeti Bajnokság I	13	0	5	1	—		—		18	1
Újpest	2016–17	Nemzeti Bajnokság I	31	3	7	1	—		—		38	4
Újpest	2017–18	Nemzeti Bajnokság I	27	0	8	0	—		—		35	0
Újpest	2018–19	Nemzeti Bajnokság I	20	1	3	1	—		4	0	27	2
Újpest	2019–20	Nemzeti Bajnokság I	23	1	3	0	—		—		26	1
Újpest	Total		114	5	26	3	—		4	0	144	8
MTK Budapest	2020–21	Nemzeti Bajnokság I	16	0	4	0	—		—		20	0
Career total			281	15	54	8	15	1	4	0	354	24

Updated to games played as of 15 May 2021.
