= Vincent Onovo =

Nigerian footballer (born 1995)

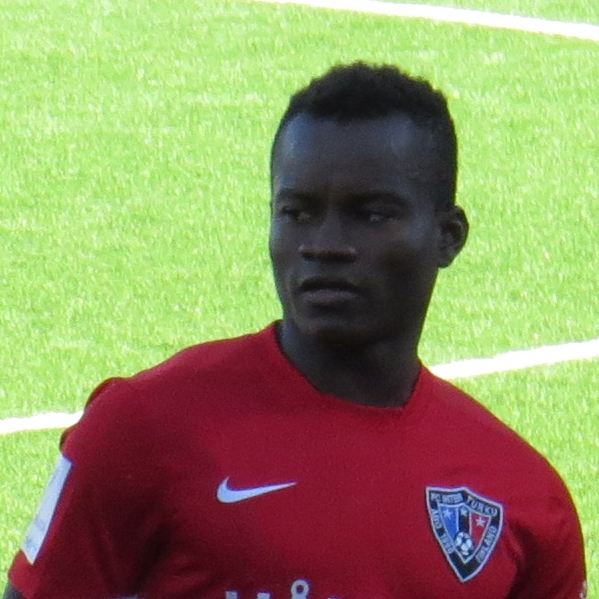
- Onovo with Inter Turku in 2015

Personal information
- Full name: Chukwuebuka Vincent Onovo
- Date of birth: 10 December 1995 (age 30)
- Place of birth: Abuja, Nigeria
- Height: 1.71 m (5 ft 7 1/2 in)
- Position: Midfielder

Senior career*
Years	Team	Apps	(Gls)
2014–2015	Inter Turku	47	(7)
2016–2017	HJK	33	(4)
2018–2021	Újpest	104	(3)
2021–2022	Randers	8	(0)
2022	→ Újpest (loan)	14	(1)
2022–2025	Újpest	59	(2)
- * Club domestic league appearances and goals as of 19 June 2025

Chukwuebuka Vincent Onovo (born 10 December 1995) is a Nigerian footballer who plays as a midfielder.

== Career ==
=== Club ===
On 26 October 2015, HJK Helsinki announced the signing of Onovo on a two-year contract from Inter Turku.

On 19 February 2018, Onovo signed for Hungarian side Újpest FC as a free agent. After a few seasons at Újpest, Onovo joined Danish Superliga club Randers FC on 17 August 2021, signing a deal until the end of 2024. In the search of more playing time, Onovo returned to his former club Újpest FC, on a loan deal for the rest of the season from Randers. On 6 June 2022, Randers confirmed that Onovo had signed Újpest permanently.

== Career statistics ==
As of 24 June 2025

Appearances and goals by club, season and competition
Club	Season	League			Cup		Other		Europe		Total	
Club	Season	Division	Apps	Goals	Apps	Goals	Apps	Goals	Apps	Goals	Apps	Goals
Inter Turku	2014	Veikkausliiga	26	3	3	0	0	0	–		29	3
Inter Turku	2015	Veikkausliiga	21	4	3	4	3	0	–		27	8
Inter Turku	Total		47	7	6	4	3	0	0	0	56	11
HJK	2016	Veikkausliiga	9	0	0	0	3	0	0	0	12	0
HJK	2017	Veikkausliiga	24	4	6	0	-		4 (Note: Appearances in UEFA Europa League)	0	34	4
HJK	Total		33	4	6	0	3	0	4	0	46	4
Újpest	2017–18	NB I	12	0	5	0	–		–		17	0
Újpest	2018–19	NB I	29	0	3	1	–		–		32	1
Újpest	2019–20	NB I	32	2	5	1	–		–		37	3
Újpest	2020–21	NB I	29	1	6	0	–		4 (Note: Appearances in UEFA Conference League)	1	39	2
Újpest	Total		102	3	19	2	0	0	4	1	125	6
Randers	2021–22	Danish Superliga	8	0	3	0	–		3	0	14	0
Újpest (loan)	2021–22	NB I	14	1	2	0	–		–		16	1
Újpest	2022–23	NB I	29	0	3	0	–		–		32	0
Újpest	2023–24	NB I	18	2	2	1	–		–		20	3
Újpest	2024–25	NB I	12	0	2	0	–		–		14	0
Újpest	Total		59	2	7	1	0	0	0	0	66	3
Career total			263	17	43	7	6	0	11	1	323	25
