= Filip Pajović =

Serbian footballer

Personal information
- Date of birth: 30 July 1993 (age 33)
- Place of birth: Zrenjanin, FR Yugoslavia
- Height: 1.87 m (6 ft 2 in)
- Position: Goalkeeper

Youth career
- Banat Zrenjanin
- Vojvodina

Senior career*
Years	Team	Apps	(Gls)
2009–2011	Vojvodina	2	(0)
2011–2014	Videoton II	33	(0)
2012–2016	Videoton	2	(0)
2012–2013	→ Puskás (loan)	1	(0)
2016	→ Puskás (loan)	5	(0)
2016–2017	Čukarički	6	(0)
2017–2023	Újpest	83	(0)
2023	Radnički 1923	2	(0)
2024	Novi Pazar	7	(0)
2025	Mladost Novi Sad	2	(0)

International career
2009–2011	Serbia U17	13	(0)
2011–2012	Serbia U19	9	(0)
- * Club domestic league appearances and goals as of 22 February 2025

Filip Pajović (Serbian Cyrillic: Филип Пајовић; born 30 July 1993) is a Serbian footballer who most recently played as a goalkeeper for Serbian club Mladost Novi Sad.

== Club statistics ==
Club	Season	League		Cup		League Cup		Europe		Total	
Club	Season	Apps	Goals	Apps	Goals	Apps	Goals	Apps	Goals	Apps	Goals
Vojvodina	2010–11	2	0	0	0	–	–	–	–	2	0
Vojvodina	Total	2	0	0	0	–	–	–	–	2	0
Videoton	2011–12	0	0	1	0	2	0	–	–	3	0
Videoton	2012–13	0	0	0	0	0	0	–	–	0	0
Videoton	2013–14	0	0	0	0	0	0	0	0	0	0
Videoton	2014–15	1	0	1	0	0	0	–	–	2	0
Videoton	2015–16	1	0	0	0	–	–	0	0	1	0
Videoton	Total	2	0	2	0	2	0	0	0	6	0
Puskás Akadémia	2012–13	1	0	0	0	–	–	–	–	1	0
Puskás Akadémia	2015–16	5	0	0	0	–	–	0	0	5	0
Puskás Akadémia	Total	6	0	0	0	–	–	–	–	6	0
Čukarički	2016–17	6	0	1	0	–	–	–	–	7	0
Čukarički	Total	6	0	1	0	–	–	–	–	7	0
Újpest	2017–18	30	0	6	0	–	–	–	–	36	0
Újpest	2018–19	28	0	2	0	–	–	4	0	34	0
Újpest	2019–20	10	0	3	0	–	–	–	–	13	0
Újpest	Total	68	0	11	0	–	–	4	0	83	0
Career Total		84	0	14	0	2	0	4	0	104	0

Updated to games played as of 27 June 2020.

== Honours ==
Videoton

- Ligakupa: 2011–12
- Nemzeti Bajnokság I: 2014–15

Újpest

- Magyar Kupa: 2017–18, 2020–21
