= Dženan Bureković =

Bosnian footballer

Personal information
- Date of birth: 29 May 1995 (age 31)
- Place of birth: Zenica, Bosnia and Herzegovina
- Height: 1.85 m (6 ft 1 in)
- Position: Left-back

Team information
- Current team: Újpest
- Number: 68

Youth career
- –2012: Čelik Zenica

Senior career*
| Years | Team | Apps | (Gls) |
| 2012–2016 | Čelik Zenica | 69 | (0) |
| 2016–2018 | Vojvodina | 8 | (0) |
| 2017 | → Čelik Zenica (loan) | 9 | (0) |
| 2018–2020 | Újpest | 69 | (1) |
| 2020–2022 | Göztepe | 29 | (0) |
| 2022– | Újpest | 0 | (0) |
| 2023 | → Spartak Subotica (loan) | 3 | (0) |

International career
| 2013 | Bosnia and Herzegovina U18 | 1 | (0) |
| 2013 | Bosnia and Herzegovina U19 | 2 | (1) |
- * Club domestic league appearances and goals as of 27 May 2023

Dženan Bureković (born 29 May 1995) is a Bosnian professional footballer who plays as a left-back for Hungarian club Újpest.

== Club career ==
In February 2023, Bureković joined Spartak Subotica in Serbia on loan.

== International career ==
He received a call for the Bosnia and Herzegovina U21 team for their game against Switzerland played on 30 June 2016, but stayed on the bench.

== Club statistics ==
| Club | Season | League | | Cup | | Europe | | Total | |
| Club | Season | Apps | Goals | Apps | Goals | Apps | Goals | Apps | Goals |
|---|---|---|---|---|---|---|---|---|---|
Čelik Zenica
| Čelik Zenica | 2011–12 | 1 | 0 | 0 | 0 | – | – | 1 | 0 |
| Čelik Zenica | 2012–13 | 5 | 0 | 0 | 0 | – | – | 0 | 0 |
| Čelik Zenica | 2013–14 | 11 | 0 | 3 | 0 | – | – | 14 | 0 |
| Čelik Zenica | 2014–15 | 26 | 0 | 0 | 0 | – | – | 26 | 0 |
| Čelik Zenica | 2015–16 | 26 | 0 | 0 | 0 | – | – | 26 | 0 |
| Čelik Zenica | 2016–17 | 9 | 0 | 0 | 0 | – | – | 9 | 0 |
| Čelik Zenica | Total | 78 | 0 | 3 | 0 | 0 | 0 | 81 | 0 |
Vojvodina
| Vojvodina | 2016–17 | 1 | 0 | 1 | 0 | – | – | 2 | 0 |
| Vojvodina | 2017–18 | 7 | 0 | 1 | 0 | 2 | 0 | 10 | 0 |
| Vojvodina | Total | 8 | 0 | 2 | 0 | 2 | 0 | 12 | 0 |
Újpest
| Újpest | 2017–18 | 11 | 0 | 7 | 0 | – | – | 18 | 0 |
| Újpest | 2018–19 | 28 | 1 | 3 | 0 | 4 | 0 | 35 | 1 |
| Újpest | 2019–20 | 27 | 0 | 5 | 0 | – | – | 32 | 0 |
| Újpest | Total | 66 | 1 | 15 | 0 | 4 | 0 | 85 | 1 |
| Career Total | | 152 | 1 | 20 | 0 | 6 | 0 | 178 | 1 |

Updated to games played as of 27 June 2020.
