= Branko Pauljević =

Serbian footballer (born 1989)

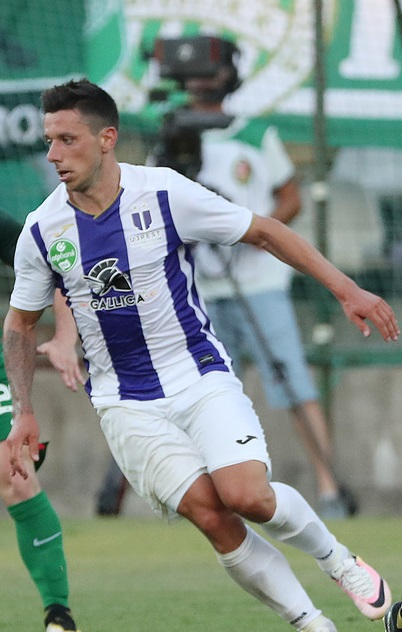
- Pauljević playing for Újpest in 2017

Personal information
- Full name: Branko Pauljević
- Date of birth: 12 June 1989 (age 37)
- Place of birth: Kusić, SFR Yugoslavia
- Height: 1.79 m (5 ft 10 1/2 in)
- Position: Right-back

Team information
- Current team: Honvéd
- Number: 49

Youth career
- 2007–2008: Voždovac

Senior career*
Years	Team	Apps	(Gls)
2008–2009	Big Bull	22	(4)
2009–2012	Hajduk Kula	59	(1)
2010	→ Senta (loan)	14	(5)
2012–2015	Partizan	5	(0)
2013–2014	→ Radnički Niš (loan)	39	(3)
2015	Pécs	13	(3)
2015–2016	Puskás Akadémia	31	(1)
2015	Puskás Akadémia II	1	(0)
2016–2017	Mezőkövesd	25	(3)
2017–2024	Újpest	219	(8)
2024–	Honvéd	37	(1)
- * Club domestic league appearances and goals as of 31 May 2026

Branko Pauljević (Serbian Cyrillic: Бранко Пауљевић; born 12 June 1989) is a Serbian professional footballer who plays as a right-back for Nemzeti Bajnokság II club Honvéd. His main asset is remarkable speed.

== Club career ==
Pauljević spent three years with Hajduk Kula between 2009 and 2012, making 59 appearances and scoring one goal in the top national division. Meanwhile, he had a loan spell with lower tier Senta in 2010.

On 23 May 2012, Pauljević was officially presented as a Partizan player, after signing a four-year contract. In the summer of 2013, he was sent on a season-long loan to Radnički Niš.

== Honours ==
Partizan

- Serbian SuperLiga: 2012–13

Újpest

- Magyar Kupa: 2017–18, 2020–21

Individual

- Serbian SuperLiga Team of the Season: 2011–12
