= Újpest FC II =

Hungarian football club

- Nickname: –
- Founded: 1885
- Ground: Chinoin Sport és Szabadidő Központ, Budapest
- Capacity: 700
- Chairman: István Csehi
- Manager: Viktor Mundi
- League: NB III; Northeast
- 2022–23: NB III; Centre, 9th of 20
Home colours	Away colours

Újpest FC II is a Hungarian football club, located in Budapest, Hungary. It currently plays in Nemzeti Bajnokság III – Northeast and acts as a second club to Újpest FC. The team's colors are violet and white.
