= 2019–20 Mezőkövesdi SE season =

Mezőkövesd
2019–20 season
- Chairman: Attila Tállai
- Manager: Attila Kuttor
- Stadium: Városi Stadion
- NB 1: 4th
- Hungarian Cup: Runners-up
- Top goalscorer: League: Budu Zivzivadze (8); All: Budu Zivzivadze (8)
- Highest home attendance: 4,140 vs Ferencváros (22 February 2020)
- Lowest home attendance: 647 vs Kaposvár (12 February 2020)
Home colours	Away colours

The 2019–20 season was Mezőkövesdi SE's 5th competitive season, 4th consecutive season in the OTP Bank Liga and 42nd year in existence as a football club.

== First team squad ==
As of 14 August 2019. Note: Flags indicate national team as defined under FIFA eligibility rules; some limited exceptions apply. Players may hold more than one non-FIFA nationality.

No.	Pos.	Nation	Player
1	GK	HUN	Dávid Dombó
4	DF	HUN	Gábor Eperjesi
5	DF	UKR	Andriy Nesterov
7	FW	HUN	Máté Sajbán
9	MF	HUN	László Pekár
11	FW	GEO	Budu Zivzivadze
13	MF	HUN	Zsombor Berecz (on loan from Fehérvár)
14	MF	BLR	Alyaksandr Karnitsky
15	MF	HUN	Bence Iszlai
17	DF	SVK	Róbert Pillár
22	DF	SRB	Daniel Farkaš
23	DF	HUN	Dániel Vadnai

No.	Pos.	Nation	Player
24	FW	HUN	Tamás Cseri (captain)
25	GK	HUN	Péter Szappanos
26	MF	HUN	Lajos Bertus
32	DF	CRO	Matija Katanec
33	FW	HUN	Gábor Molnár
55	MF	HUN	Dániel Nagy
70	DF	HUN	Erik Silye (on loan from Ferencvárosi)
71	FW	HUN	Filip Dragóner
77	MF	UKR	Shandor Vayda
88	DF	HUN	Tamás Szeles
91	FW	HUN	Tamás Takács
97	MF	UKR	Mykhaylo Meskhi
-	MF	BLR	Artem Kontsevoy (on loan from Dnyapro Mogilev)

== Transfers ==
=== Summer ===
In: Note: Flags indicate national team as defined under FIFA eligibility rules; some limited exceptions apply. Players may hold more than one non-FIFA nationality.

No.	Pos.	Nation	Player
5	DF	UKR	Andriy Nesterov (from (Ukraine) Karpaty Lviv)
7	FW	HUN	Máté Sajbán (from Budaörs)
8	MF	HUN	Richárd Nagy (loan return from Kaposvár)
9	FW	HUN	Csanád Novák (loan return from Zalaegerszeg)
11	FW	GEO	Budu Zivzivadze (from (Georgia (country)) Torpedo Kutaisi)
13	MF	HUN	Zsombor Berecz (loan from Fehérvár)
14	MF	BLR	Alyaksandr Karnitsky (from (Romania) Sepsi)
14	FW	HUN	Botond Földi (loan return from Cegléd)
16	MF	HUN	István Csirmaz (loan return from Cegléd)
18	MF	HUN	Zoltán Varjas (loan return from Cegléd)
20	FW	HUN	László Varjas (loan return from Vác)
33	FW	HUN	Gábor Molnár (from Puskás Akadémia)
55	MF	HUN	Dániel Nagy (from Újpest)
91	FW	HUN	Tamás Takács (from Debrecen)
99	MF	ROU	Dominik Wieland (loan return from Vác)
—	MF	HUN	Miklós Sajbán (from Budaörs)
—	MF	BLR	Artem Kontsevoy (loan from (Belarus) Dnepr Mogilev)

Out: Note: Flags indicate national team as defined under FIFA eligibility rules; some limited exceptions apply. Players may hold more than one non-FIFA nationality.

No.	Pos.	Nation	Player
7	MF	HUN	Bence Tóth (to Gyirmót)
8	MF	HUN	Richárd Nagy (to Kaposvár)
8	MF	HUN	Máté Tóth (loan return to Szombathelyi Haladás)
9	FW	HUN	Csanád Novák (loan to Szombathelyi Haladás)
10	FW	HUN	Márk Koszta (to Újpest)
12	GK	CRO	Dino Hodžić (to (Iceland) Akranes)
14	FW	HUN	Botond Földi (loan to Dorog)
16	MF	HUN	István Csirmaz (to Szolnok)
18	MF	HUN	Zoltán Varjas (loan to (Slovakia) Komárno)
21	FW	SRB	Stefan Dražić (to (China) Changchun Yatai)
33	FW	HUN	Gábor Molnár (loan return to Puskás Akadémia)
39	DF	SVK	Dávid Hudák (to Gyirmót)
40	MF	NIG	Amadou Moutari (to Budapest Honvéd)
41	DF	HUN	Attila Szalai (to (Cyprus) Apollon Limassol)

=== Winter ===
In: Note: Flags indicate national team as defined under FIFA eligibility rules; some limited exceptions apply. Players may hold more than one non-FIFA nationality.

No.	Pos.	Nation	Player
1	GK	UKR	Danylo Ryabenko (from (Tajikistan) CSKA Pamir)
6	MF	BIH	Dino Beširović (loan from (Croatia) Hajduk Split)
9	FW	HUN	Csanád Novák (loan return from Szombathelyi Haladás)
20	DF	HUN	Richárd Guzmics (from (Slovakia) Slovan Bratislava)
71	FW	HUN	Filip Dragóner (loan return from Szeged)
99	FW	BIH	Marin Jurina (from (Bosnia and Herzegovina) Čelik Zenica)
—	FW	SRB	Goran Matić (from (Slovakia) Slavoj Trebišov)

Out: Note: Flags indicate national team as defined under FIFA eligibility rules; some limited exceptions apply. Players may hold more than one non-FIFA nationality.

No.	Pos.	Nation	Player
1	GK	HUN	Dávid Dombó (to Kisvárda)
7	FW	HUN	Máté Sajbán (loan to Paks)
9	FW	HUN	Csanád Novák (loan to Szolnok)
12	MF	HUN	Miklós Sajbán (loan to Budaörs)
20	MF	BLR	Artem Kontsevoy (loan return to (Belarus) Dnepr Mogilev)
26	MF	HUN	Lajos Bertus (to Paks)
32	MF	CRO	Matija Katanec (loan to Zalaegerszeg)
33	FW	HUN	Gábor Molnár (to Diósgyőr)
—	FW	SRB	Goran Matić (loan to (Slovakia) Komárno)

== Competitions ==
=== Overview ===
Competition	First match	Last match	Starting round	Final position	Record							
Competition	First match	Last match	Starting round	Final position	Pld	W	D	L	GF	GA	GD	Win %
Nemzeti Bajnokság I	3 August 2019	–	Matchday 1	Matchday 33	33	14	8	11	42	31	+11	42.42
Magyar Kupa	22 September 2019	-	Sixth round		2	2	0	0	8	1	+7	100.00
Total					35	16	8	11	50	32	+18	45.71

Last updated: 14 December 2019
Source: Competitions

=== Nemzeti Bajnokság I ===
==== League table ====
Pos	Team	Pld	W	D	L	GF	GA	GD	Pts	Qualification or relegation
2	Fehérvár	33	18	9	6	56	29	+27	63	Qualification for the Europa League first qualifying round
3	Puskás Akadémia	33	14	12	7	52	41	+11	54	Qualification for the Europa League first qualifying round
4	Mezőkövesd	33	14	8	11	42	31	+11	50	
5	Honvéd	33	12	8	13	36	44	−8	44	Qualification for the Europa League first qualifying round (Note: Budapest Honvéd qualified for the Europa League first qualifying round by winning the 2019–20 Magyar Kupa.)
6	Újpest	33	12	7	14	45	45	0	43	

Source: Hungarian Football Federation (in Hungarian), Soccerway
Rules for classification: 1) Points; 2) Matches won; 3) Goal difference; 4) Goals scored; 5) Head-to-head points; 6) Head-to-head goal difference; 7) Head-to-head away goals scored; 8) Fair play ranking; 9) Drawing of lots.

==== Results summary ====
Overall								Home						Away					
Pld	W	D	L	GF	GA	GD	Pts	W	D	L	GF	GA	GD	W	D	L	GF	GA	GD
33	14	8	11	42	31	+11	50	7	3	7	18	16	+2	7	5	4	24	15	+9

Last updated: 27 June 2020.
Source: NB1

==== Results by round ====
Round	1	2	3	4	5	6	7	8	9	10	11	12	13	14	15	16	17	18	19	20	21	22	23	24	25	26	27	28	29	30	31	32	33
Ground	H	A	H	A	H	A	H	A	H	H	A	A	H	A	H	A	H	A	H	A	A	H	H	A	H	A	H	A	H	A	H	H	A
Result	W	W	W	W	L	W	L	W	D	W	D	D	W	D	L	L	W	W	D	L	W	W	L	W	D	L	L	D	L	D	W	L	L
Position	5	3	3	2	2	3	3	3	3	3	3	3	2	3	3	3	3	3	3	3	3	3	3	3	3	3	3	3	3	3	3	4	4

Updated to match(es) played on 27 June 2020. Source: Matches
A = Away; H = Home; W = Win; D = Draw; L = Loss

==== Matches ====
3 August 2019 1	Mezőkövesd	1 – 0	Zalaegerszeg	Mezőkövesd
19:30 CEST	Zivzivadze 20'	Report		Stadium: Városi Stadion; Attendance: 2,245; Referee: József Erdős

10 August 2019 2	Kaposvár	1 – 2	Mezőkövesd	Kaposvár
17:00 CEST	K. Nagy 12'	Report	D. Nagy 14'; Cseri 30'	Stadium: Rákóczi Stadion; Attendance: 2,950; Referee: Balázs Berke

17 August 2019 3	Mezőkövesd	1 – 0	Puskás Akadémia	Mezőkövesd
19:30 CEST	Cseri 46'	Report		Stadium: Városi Stadion; Attendance: 2,214; Referee: Tamás Bognár

24 August 2019 4	Diósgyőr	0 – 3	Mezőkövesd	Miskolc
18:00 CEST		Report	Nagy 51'; Karnitsky 56'; Cseri 66'	Stadium: Diósgyőri Stadion; Attendance: 4,853; Referee: Sándor Andó-Szabó

31 August 2019 5	Mezőkövesd	0 – 2	Paks	Mezőkövesd
19:30 CEST		Report	Hahn 22' (pen.), 50'	Stadium: Városi Stadion; Attendance: 2,362; Referee: Csaba Pintér

14 September 2019 6	Kisvárda	1 – 2	Mezőkövesd	Kisvárda
17:00 CEST	Tischler 48'	Report	Zivzivadze 12', 63'	Stadium: Várkerti Stadion; Attendance: 2,520; Referee: Tamás Bognár

28 September 2019 7	Mezőkövesd	1 – 2	Budapest Honvéd	Mezőkövesd
17:00 CEST	Sajbán 79'	Report	Banó-Szabó 34'; Ben-Hatira 49'	Stadium: Városi Stadion; Attendance: 2,456; Referee: Gergő Bogár

5 October 2019 8	Újpest	1 – 2	Mezőkövesd	Budapest
14:30 CEST	Koszta 90+3'	Report	Berecz 43'; Silye 89'	Stadium: Illovszky Rudolf Stadion; Attendance: 2,248; Referee: Balázs Berke

19 October 2019 9	Mezőkövesd	0 – 0	Fehérvár	Mezőkövesd
17:00 CEST		Report		Stadium: Városi Stadion; Attendance: 2,642; Referee: Ádám Farkas

26 October 2019 10	Mezőkövesd	3 – 1	Debrecen	Mezőkövesd
14:30 CEST	Berecz 45'; Zivzivadze 53'; Vayda 82'	Report	Adeniji 61'	Stadium: Városi Stadion; Attendance: 2,628; Referee: Tamás Bognár

2 November 2019 11	Ferencváros	1 – 1	Mezőkövesd	Budapest
17:00 CET	Ihnatenko 9'	Report	Zivzivadze 49'	Stadium: Groupama Arena; Attendance: 7,437; Referee: Csaba Pintér

9 November 2019 12	Zalaegerszeg	1 – 1	Mezőkövesd	Zalaegerszeg
17:00 CET	G. Bobál 60'	Report	Zivzivadze 41'	Stadium: ZTE Arena; Attendance: 2,780; Referee: Viktor Kassai

23 November 2019 13	Mezőkövesd	2 – 0	Kaposvár	Mezőkövesd
17:00 CET	Cseri 45' (pen.); Berecz 47'	Report		Stadium: Városi Stadion; Attendance: 1,452; Referee: Péter Solymosi

30 November 2019 14	Puskás Akadémia	1 – 1	Mezőkövesd	Felcsút
17:00 CET	Henty 6'	Report	Karnitsky 88'	Stadium: Pancho Aréna; Attendance: 1,028; Referee: Csaba Pintér

7 December 2019 15	Mezőkövesd	0 – 1	Diósgyőr	Mezőkövesd
14:30 CET		Report	Rui Pedro 89'	Stadium: Mezőkövesdi Városi Stadion; Attendance: 2,656; Referee: Zoltán Iványi

14 December 2019 16	Paks	1 – 0	Mezőkövesd	Paks
17:00 CET	Windecker 11'	Report		Stadium: Fehérvári úti Stadion; Attendance: 1,110; Referee: Csaba Pintér

25 January 2020 17	Mezőkövesd	1 – 0	Kisvárda	Mezőkövesd
17:00 CET	Nesterov 18'	Report		Stadium: Mezőkövesdi Városi Stadion; Attendance: 1,652; Referee: Péter Solymosi

1 February 2020 18	Budapest Honvéd	1 – 2	Mezőkövesd	Budapest
17:00 CET	Moutari 29' (pen.)	Report	Nagy 40'; Beširović 51'	Stadium: Hidegkuti Nándor Stadion; Attendance: 1,973; Referee: Zoltán Iványi

4 February 2020 19	Mezőkövesd	2 – 2	Újpest	Mezőkövesd
20:00 CET	Jurina 53'; Beširović 88'	Report	Berecz 14' (o.g.); Novothny 57'	Stadium: Mezőkövesdi Városi Stadion; Attendance: 1,582; Referee: Ádám Pillók

8 February 2020 20	Fehérvár	2 – 1	Mezőkövesd	Székesfehérvár
17:00 CET	Hodžić 18'; Houri 37'	Report	Berecz 16'	Stadium: MOL Aréna Sóstó; Attendance: 2,716; Referee: Péter Solymosi

15 February 2020 21	Debrecen	1 – 3	Mezőkövesd	Debrecen
17:00 CET	Trujić 90+1'	Report	Pillár 29'; Zivzivadze 37'; Silye 48'	Stadium: Nagyerdei Stadion; Attendance: 3,020; Referee: Tamás Bognár

22 February 2020 22	Mezőkövesd	3 – 0	Ferencváros	Mezőkövesd
19:30 CET	Karnitsky 12'; Beširović 29'; Cseri 35'	Report		Stadium: Mezőkövesdi Városi Stadion; Attendance: 4,140; Referee: Zoltán Iványi

29 February 2020 23	Mezőkövesd	1 – 2	Zalaegerszeg	Mezőkövesd
17:00 CET	Cseri 80' (pen.)	Report	Mitrović 39'; Bőle 46'	Stadium: Városi Stadion; Attendance: 1,479; Referee: István Vad

7 March 2020 24	Kaposvár	0 – 4	Mezőkövesd	Kaposvár
17:00 CET		Report	Beširović 32'; Jurina 49'; Cseri 62' (pen.); Zivzivadze 90'	Stadium: Rákóczi Stadion; Attendance: 1,011; Referee: Bence Csonka

14 March 2020 25	Mezőkövesd	0 – 0	Puskás Akadémia	Mezőkövesd
17:00 CET		Report		Stadium: Városi Stadion; Attendance: x Referee: József Erdős

30 May 2020 26	Diósgyőr	1 – 0	Mezőkövesd	Miskolc
19:00 CEST	Iszlai 83'	Report		Stadium: Diósgyőri Stadion; Attendance: 2,255; Referee: Zoltán Iványi

6 June 2020 27	Mezőkövesd	0 – 2	Paks	Mezőkövesd
16:55 CEST		Report	Könyves 50', 64'	Stadium: Városi Stadion; Attendance: 784; Referee: Péter Solymosi

9 June 2020 28	Kisvárda	1 – 1	Mezőkövesd	Kisvárda
16:55 CEST	Viana 23'	Report	Nagy 48'	Stadium: Várkerti Stadion; Attendance: 832; Referee: Gergő Bogár

12 June 2020 29	Mezőkövesd	1 – 2	Budapest Honvéd	Mezőkövesd
20:00 CEST	Dragóner 90+2'	Report	Ugrai 11'; Gazdag 38'	Stadium: Városi Stadion; Attendance: 978; Referee: István Vad

17 June 2020 30	Újpest	1 – 1	Mezőkövesd	Budapest
21:05 CEST	Koszta 90+5'	Report	Pekár 66'	Stadium: Szusza Ferenc Stadion; Attendance: 2,300; Referee: Csaba Pintér

20 June 2020 31	Mezőkövesd	2 – 1	Fehérvár	Mezőkövesd
16:55 CEST	Beširović 35'; Meskhi 90+3'	Report	Futács 29'	Stadium: Városi Stadion; Attendance: 1,987; Referee: Ferenc Karakó

24 June 2020 32	Mezőkövesd	0 – 1	Debrecen	Mezőkövesd
16:55 CEST		Report	Garba 90'	Stadium: Városi Stadion; Attendance: 3,190; Referee: Sándor Andó-Szabó

27 June 2020 33	Ferencváros	1 – 0	Mezőkövesd	Budapest
20:00 CEST	Nguen 41'	Report		Stadium: Groupama Arena; Attendance: 11,875; Referee: József Erdős

=== Hungarian Cup ===
21 September 2019 6th round	Hévíz	0 – 6	Mezőkövesd	Hévíz
15:00 CEST		Report	Bertus 7'; Sajbán 11', 28', 30'; Nesterov 26'; Takács 34'	Stadium: Hévízi Sportpálya; Attendance: 300; Referee: Gábor Barna

30 October 2019 7th round	Sényő	1 – 2	Mezőkövesd	Sényő
12:30 CET	Kapacina 18'	Report	Molnár 21'; Takács 41'	Stadium: Sényői Sportpálya; Attendance: 300; Referee: Norbert Nagy

4 December 2019 8th round	Győr	2 – 3 (a.e.t.)	Mezőkövesd	Győr
18:00 CET	Szánthó 33'; Bagi 103'	Report	Eperjesi 10'; Berecz 112'; Zivzivadze 117'	Stadium: ETO Park; Attendance: 420; Referee: Gábor Oláh

12 February 2020 Round of 16 (1st leg)	Mezőkövesd	2 – 1	Kaposvár	Mezőkövesd
18:00 CET	Pillár 82'; Cseri 90+2'	Report	Ádám 66'	Stadium: Mezőkövesdi Városi Stadion; Attendance: 647; Referee: László Lovas

19 February 2020 Round of 16 (2nd leg)	Kaposvár	1 – 3 (2 – 5 agg.)	Mezőkövesd	Kaposvár
18:00 CET	Vachtler 83'	Report	Takács 44'; Jurina 65'; Berecz 78' (pen.)	Stadium: Rákóczi Stadion; Attendance: 532; Referee: Gergő Bogár

3 March 2020 Quarter-final (1st leg)	Puskás Akadémia	0 – 1	Mezőkövesd	Felcsút
18:50 CET		Report	Zivzivadze 47'	Stadium: Pancho Aréna; Attendance: 742; Referee: Tamás Bognár

11 March 2020 Quarter-final (2nd leg)	Mezőkövesd	1 – 1 (2 – 1 agg.)	Puskás Akadémia	Mezőkövesd
18:00 CET	Pillár 89'	Report	Gyurcsó 47'	Stadium: Mezőkövesdi Városi Stadion; Attendance: 939; Referee: Sándor Andó-Szabó

23 May 2020 Semi-final (1st leg)	Mezőkövesd	1 – 1	Fehérvár	Mezőkövesd
18:00 CEST	Pillár 80'	Report	Pátkai 12'	Stadium: Mezőkövesdi Városi Stadion; Attendance: no spectators Referee: Ádám Farkas

26 May 2020 Semi-final (2nd leg)	Fehérvár	2 – 2 (a) (3 – 3 agg.)	Mezőkövesd	Székesfehérvár
18:00 CEST	Hodžić 63'; Stopira 86'	Report	Zivzivadze 8'; Pekár 54'	Stadium: MOL Aréna Sóstó; Attendance: no spectators Referee: István Vad

3 June 2020 Final	Budapest Honvéd	2 – 1	Mezőkövesd	Budapest
20:00 CEST	Kamber 33', 56'	Report	Pekár 37'	Stadium: Puskás Aréna; Attendance: 10,000; Referee: Tamás Bognár

== Statistics ==
=== Appearances and goals ===
Last updated on 27 June 2020.

No.	Pos	Nat	Player	Total		OTP Bank Liga		Hungarian Cup	
No.	Pos	Nat	Player	Apps	Goals	Apps	Goals	Apps	Goals
1	GK	(Ukraine) UKR	Danylo Ryabenko	2	-2	1	-1	1	-1
4	DF	(Hungary) HUN	Gábor Eperjesi	21	1	15	0	6	1
5	DF	(Ukraine) UKR	Andriy Nesterov	28	2	21	1	7	1
6	MF	(Bosnia and Herzegovina) BIH	Dino Beširović	22	5	16	5	6	0
9	MF	(Hungary) HUN	László Pekár	34	2	26	0	8	2
11	FW	(Georgia (country)) GEO	Budu Zivzivadze	40	11	32	8	8	3
13	MF	(Hungary) HUN	Zsombor Berecz	37	6	28	4	9	2
14	MF	(Belarus) BLR	Alyaksandr Karnitsky	40	3	31	3	9	0
17	DF	(Slovakia) SVK	Róbert Pillár	30	4	23	1	7	3
20	DF	(Hungary) HUN	Richárd Guzmics	3	0	3	0	0	0
22	DF	(Serbia) SRB	Daniel Farkaš	31	0	25	0	6	0
23	DF	(Hungary) HUN	Dániel Vadnai	29	0	22	0	7	0
24	MF	(Hungary) HUN	Tamás Cseri	38	8	32	7	6	1
25	GK	(Hungary) HUN	Péter Szappanos	39	-39	32	-30	7	-9
55	MF	(Hungary) HUN	Dániel Nagy	38	4	32	4	6	0
70	DF	(Hungary) HUN	Erik Silye	26	2	21	2	5	0
71	FW	(Hungary) HUN	Filip Dragóner	4	1	4	1	0	0
77	MF	(Ukraine) UKR	Shandor Vayda	34	1	26	1	8	0
88	DF	(Hungary) HUN	Tamás Szeles	3	0	3	0	0	0
91	FW	(Hungary) HUN	Tamás Takács	22	3	15	0	7	3
97	MF	(Ukraine) UKR	Mykhaylo Meskhi	16	1	11	1	5	0
99	FW	(Bosnia and Herzegovina) BIH	Marin Jurina	21	3	14	2	7	1
Youth players:
19	FW	(Hungary) HUN	Alexander Torvund	0	0	0	0	0	0
30	GK	(Hungary) HUN	Eduárd Fedinisinec	0	0	0	0	0	0
75	FW	(Hungary) HUN	László Varjas	1	0	0	0	1	0
76	MF	(Hungary) HUN	Dominik Tóth	0	0	0	0	0	0
Out to loan:
7	FW	(Hungary) HUN	Máté Sajbán	10	4	7	1	3	3
Players no longer at the club:
1	GK	(Hungary) HUN	Dávid Dombó	2	-1	0	0	2	-1
20	MF	(Belarus) BLR	Artem Kontsevoy	3	0	0	0	3	0
26	MF	(Hungary) HUN	Lajos Bertus	6	1	3	0	3	1
32	DF	(Croatia) CRO	Matija Katanec	20	0	17	0	3	0
33	FW	(Hungary) HUN	Gábor Molnár	9	1	7	0	2	1

=== Top scorers ===
Includes all competitive matches. The list is sorted by shirt number when total goals are equal.

Last updated on 27 June 2020

Position	Nation	Number	Name	OTP Bank Liga	Hungarian Cup	Total
1	(Georgia (country))	11	Budu Zivzivadze	8	3	11
2	(Hungary)	24	Tamás Cseri	7	1	8
3	(Hungary)	13	Zsombor Berecz	4	2	6
4	(Bosnia and Herzegovina)	6	Dino Beširović	5	0	5
5	(Hungary)	55	Dániel Nagy	4	0	4
6	(Hungary)	7	Máté Sajbán	1	3	4
7	(Slovakia)	17	Róbert Pillár	1	3	4
8	(Belarus)	14	Alyaksandr Karnitsky	3	0	3
9	(Bosnia and Herzegovina)	99	Marin Jurina	2	1	3
10	(Hungary)	9	László Pekár	1	2	3
11	(Hungary)	91	Tamás Takács	0	3	3
12	(Hungary)	70	Erik Silye	2	0	2
13	(Ukraine)	5	Andriy Nesterov	1	1	2
14	(Ukraine)	77	Shandor Vayda	1	0	1
15	(Hungary)	71	Filip Dragóner	1	0	1
16	(Ukraine)	97	Mykhaylo Meskhi	1	0	1
17	(Hungary)	26	Lajos Bertus	0	1	1
18	(Hungary)	33	Gábor Molnár	0	1	1
19	(Hungary)	4	Gábor Eperjesi	0	1	1
/	/	/	Own Goals	0	0	0
			TOTALS	42	22	64

=== Disciplinary record ===
Includes all competitive matches. Players with 1 card or more included only.

Last updated on 27 June 2020

Position	Nation	Number	Name	OTP Bank Liga		Hungarian Cup		Total (Hu Total)	
Position	Nation	Number	Name	Booked	Sent off (straight red)	Booked	Sent off (straight red)	Booked	Sent off (straight red)
GK	(Hungary)	1	Dávid Dombó	0	0	1	0	1 (0)	0 (0)
DF	(Hungary)	4	Gábor Eperjesi	3	0	1	0	4 (3)	0 (0)
DF	(Ukraine)	5	Andriy Nesterov	2	1	2	0	4 (2)	1 (1)
MF	(Bosnia and Herzegovina)	6	Dino Beširović	5	0	2	0	7 (5)	0 (0)
MF	(Hungary)	9	László Pekár	3	0	1	0	4 (3)	0 (0)
FW	(Georgia (country))	11	Budu Zivzivadze	4	0	0	0	4 (4)	0 (0)
MF	(Hungary)	13	Zsombor Berecz	11	0	3	0	14 (11)	0 (0)
MF	(Belarus)	14	Alyaksandr Karnitsky	4	2	1	0	5 (4)	2 (2)
DF	(Slovakia)	17	Róbert Pillár	5	0	2	0	7 (5)	0 (0)
DF	(Hungary)	20	Richárd Guzmics	1	0	0	0	1 (1)	0 (0)
DF	(Serbia)	22	Daniel Farkaš	3	1	1	0	4 (3)	1 (1)
DF	(Hungary)	23	Dániel Vadnai	5	0	3	0	8 (5)	0 (0)
MF	(Hungary)	24	Tamás Cseri	3	0	0	0	3 (3)	0 (0)
GK	(Hungary)	25	Péter Szappanos	2	0	0	0	2 (2)	0 (0)
MF	(Hungary)	26	Lajos Bertus	1	0	0	0	1 (1)	0 (0)
DF	(Croatia)	32	Matija Katanec	6	0	0	0	6 (6)	0 (0)
MF	(Hungary)	55	Dániel Nagy	5	0	2	0	7 (5)	0 (0)
DF	(Hungary)	70	Erik Silye	2	0	1	0	3 (2)	0 (0)
FW	(Hungary)	71	Filip Dragóner	1	0	0	0	1 (1)	0 (0)
MF	(Ukraine)	77	Shandor Vayda	2	0	0	0	2 (2)	0 (0)
DF	(Hungary)	88	Tamás Szeles	1	0	0	0	1 (1)	0 (0)
FW	(Hungary)	91	Tamás Takács	2	0	0	0	2 (2)	0 (0)
MF	(Ukraine)	97	Mykhaylo Meskhi	2	0	0	0	2 (2)	0 (0)
FW	(Bosnia and Herzegovina)	99	Marin Jurina	1	0	0	0	1 (1)	0 (0)
			TOTALS	74	4	20	0	94 (74)	4 (4)

=== Overall ===
Games played	43 (33 OTP Bank Liga and 10 Hungarian Cup)
Games won	20 (14 OTP Bank Liga and 6 Hungarian Cup)
Games drawn	11 (8 OTP Bank Liga and 3 Hungarian Cup)
Games lost	12 (11 OTP Bank Liga and 1 Hungarian Cup)
Goals scored	64
Goals conceded	42
Goal difference	+22
Yellow cards	94
Red cards	4
Worst discipline	(Hungary) Zsombor Berecz (14 (yellow card) , 0 (red card) )
Best result	6–0 (A) v Hévíz - Magyar Kupa - 21-9-2019
Worst result	0–2 (H) v Paks - Nemzeti Bajnokság I - 31-08-2019
Worst result	0–2 (H) v Paks - Nemzeti Bajnokság I - 06-06-2020
Most appearances	(Georgia (country)) Budu Zivzivadze (40 appearances)
Most appearances	(Belarus) Alyaksandr Karnitsky (40 appearances)
Top scorer	(Georgia (country)) Budu Zivzivadze (11 goals)
Points	71/129 (55.03%)

Last updated: 27 June 2020
