= 2020–21 Mezőkövesdi SE season =

Mezőkövesd
2020–21 season
- Chairman: Attila Tállai
- Manager: Attila Kuttor (until 11 November 2020); Attila Pintér
- Stadium: Városi Stadion
- NB 1: 8th
- Hungarian Cup: quarter-final
- Top goalscorer: League: Marin Jurina (6); Tamás Cseri (6); Dino Beširović (6); All: Marin Jurina (8)
Home colours	Away colours

The 2020–21 season was Mezőkövesdi SE's 6th competitive season, 5th consecutive season in the OTP Bank Liga and 43rd year in existence as a football club.

== Transfers ==
=== Summer ===
In: Note: Flags indicate national team as defined under FIFA eligibility rules; some limited exceptions apply. Players may hold more than one non-FIFA nationality.

No.	Pos.	Nation	Player
7	FW	HUN	Márk Bencze (from Siófok)
8	MF	HUN	Máté Tóth (loan return from Szeged)
9	FW	UKR	Andriy Boryachuk (loan from (Ukraine) Shakhtar Donetsk)
10	MF	BIH	Dino Beširović (from (Croatia) Hajduk Split)
12	DF	GEO	Luka Lakvekheliani (from (Georgia (country)) Saburtalo)
13	MF	HUN	Zsombor Berecz (from Fehérvár)
26	DF	HUN	Márk Jagodics (from Szombathelyi Haladás)
28	FW	RUS	Serder Serderov (from (Croatia) Inter Zaprešić)
32	DF	CRO	Matija Katanec (loan return from Zalaegerszeg)
39	MF	BUL	Antonio Vutov (from (Bulgaria) Botev Plovdiv)
—	DF	HUN	Máté Kotula (from Szolnok)
—	MF	HUN	Bálint Oláh (loan return from Budafok)
—	FW	HUN	Botond Földi (loan return from Dorog)
—	MF	HUN	Zoltán Varjas (loan return from (Slovakia) Komárno)
—	MF	HUN	Miklós Sajbán (loan return from Budaörs)
—	FW	HUN	Máté Sajbán (loan return from Paks)
—	FW	HUN	Csanád Novák (loan return from Szolnok)

Out: Note: Flags indicate national team as defined under FIFA eligibility rules; some limited exceptions apply. Players may hold more than one non-FIFA nationality.

No.	Pos.	Nation	Player
6	MF	BIH	Dino Beširović (loan return to (Croatia) Hajduk Split)
9	MF	HUN	László Pekár (to Vasas)
11	FW	GEO	Budu Zivzivadze (to Fehérvár)
13	MF	HUN	Zsombor Berecz (loan return to Fehérvár)
70	DF	HUN	Erik Silye (loan return to Ferencváros)
71	FW	HUN	Filip Dragóner (to Zalaegerszeg)
91	FW	HUN	Tamás Takács (loan to Szeged)
—	MF	HUN	Miklós Sajbán (to Budaörs)
—	FW	HUN	Botond Földi (loan to Kaposvár)
—	MF	HUN	Zoltán Varjas (loan to Kaposvár)
—	DF	HUN	Máté Kotula (loan to Szolnok)
—	MF	HUN	Bálint Oláh (to Budafok)
—	FW	HUN	Máté Sajbán (to Paks)
—	FW	HUN	Csanád Novák (to Szolnok)

=== Winter ===
In: Note: Flags indicate national team as defined under FIFA eligibility rules; some limited exceptions apply. Players may hold more than one non-FIFA nationality.

No.	Pos.	Nation	Player
3	DF	GRE	Konstantinos Dimitriou (from (Switzerland) Basel)
8	MF	GEO	Nodar Kavtaradze (from (Georgia (country)) Dinamo Tbilisi)
9	MF	SVK	Martin Chrien (from (Portugal) Benfica B)
11	FW	SVK	Jakub Vojtuš (from (Romania) CFR Cluj)
16	GK	SRB	Branimir Aleksić (from Szeged)
18	MF	AUT	Manuel Martic (from (Croatia) Inter Zaprešić)
21	MF	CRO	Karlo Kamenar (from (Croatia) Osijek)
30	MF	POR	Rui Pedro (from Diósgyőr)
31	MF	HUN	Dávid Barczi (from Zalaegerszeg)
—	MF	HUN	Péter Takács (from Debreceni EAC)
—	FW	HUN	Botond Földi (loan return from Kaposvár)
—	MF	HUN	Zoltán Varjas (loan return from Kaposvár)
—	FW	HUN	László Varjas (loan return from Kaposvár)
—	FW	HUN	Tamás Takács (loan return from Szeged)

Out: Note: Flags indicate national team as defined under FIFA eligibility rules; some limited exceptions apply. Players may hold more than one non-FIFA nationality.

No.	Pos.	Nation	Player
9	FW	UKR	Andriy Boryachuk (loan return to (Ukraine) Shakhtar Donetsk)
13	MF	HUN	Zsombor Berecz (to Vasas)
26	DF	HUN	Márk Jagodics (loan to Budafok)
—	MF	HUN	Zoltán Varjas (loan to Siófok)
—	FW	HUN	Botond Földi (loan to Ajka)
—	FW	HUN	Tamás Takács (loan to Kazincbarcika)

=== Nemzeti Bajnokság I ===
==== League table ====
Pos	Team	Pld	W	D	L	GF	GA	GD	Pts	Qualification or relegation
6	Újpest	33	12	6	15	46	67	−21	42	Qualification for the Europa Conference League second qualifying round (Note: Újpest qualified for the Europa Conference League second qualifying round as the 2020–21 Magyar Kupa winners.)
7	MTK	33	11	9	13	44	49	−5	42	
8	Mezőkövesd	33	11	9	13	40	46	−6	42	
9	Zalaegerszeg	33	10	7	16	58	58	0	37	
10	Honvéd	33	9	10	14	46	48	−2	37	

Source: Hungarian Football Federation (in Hungarian), Soccerway
Rules for classification: 1) Points; 2) Matches won; 3) Goal difference; 4) Goals scored; 5) Head-to-head points; 6) Head-to-head goal difference; 7) Head-to-head away goals scored; 8) Fair play ranking; 9) Drawing of lots.

==== Results summary ====
Overall								Home						Away					
Pld	W	D	L	GF	GA	GD	Pts	W	D	L	GF	GA	GD	W	D	L	GF	GA	GD
33	11	9	13	40	46	−6	42	9	2	5	28	21	+7	2	7	8	12	25	−13

Last updated: 10 May 2021.
Source: NB1

==== Results by round ====
Round	1	2	3	4	5	6	7	8	9	10	11	12	13	14	15	16	17	18	19	20	21	22	23	24	25	26	27	28	29	30	31	32	33
Ground	A	H	A	H	A	H	A	H	A	A	H	H	A	H	A	H	A	H	A	H	H	A	A	H	A	H	A	H	A	H	A	A	H
Result	L	D	W	W	L	L	L	L	D	L	L	W	L	W	W	W	D	W	D	W	D	D	D	W	D	W	L	L	L	L	D	L	W
Position	10	8	6	4	6	6	11	12	12	12	12	12	12	10	8	8	8	7	7	6	7	7	6	5	5	5	5	6	8	8	7	8	8

Updated to match(es) played on 10 May 2021. Source: Matches
A = Away; H = Home; W = Win; D = Draw; L = Loss

==== Matches ====
16 August 2020 1	Diósgyőr	2 – 1	Mezőkövesd	Miskolc
16:55 CEST	Iszlai 8' (pen.); Dražić 18'	Report	Berecz 27'	Stadium: DVTK Stadion; Attendance: 5,099; Referee: Balázs Berke

21 August 2020 2	Mezőkövesd	1 – 1	Zalaegerszeg	Mezőkövesd
16:30 CEST	Jurina 63'	Report	Vass 37'	Stadium: Mezőkövesdi Városi Stadion; Attendance: 2,018; Referee: Péter Solymosi

29 August 2020 3	Paks	1 – 2	Mezőkövesd	Paks
20:30 CEST	Böde 65'	Report	Berecz 17'; Cseri 37'	Stadium: Stadion PSE; Attendance: 1,398; Referee: Mihály Káprály

12 September 2020 4	Mezőkövesd	1 – 0	Budafok	Mezőkövesd
14:45 CEST	Serderov 50'	Report		Stadium: Mezőkövesdi Városi Stadion; Attendance: 1,868; Referee: Ádám Farkas

25 September 2020 5	Puskás Akadémia	1 – 0	Mezőkövesd	Felcsút
20:00 CEST	Băluță 59'	Report		Stadium: Pancho Aréna; Attendance: 782; Referee: Gergő Bogár

3 October 2020 6	Mezőkövesd	1 – 2	Kisvárda	Mezőkövesd
17:00 CEST	Ene 90' (o.g.)	Report	Simović 5'; Navrátil 14'	Stadium: Mezőkövesdi Városi Stadion; Attendance: 1,520; Referee: Mihály Káprály

17 October 2020 7	Újpest	1 – 0	Mezőkövesd	Budapest
17:00 CEST	Tallo 60'	Report		Stadium: Szusza Ferenc Stadion; Attendance: 1,019; Referee: József Erdős

25 October 2020 8	Mezőkövesd	1 – 2	Fehérvár	Mezőkövesd
17:00 CET	Berecz 87' (pen.)	Report	Négo 32'; Houri 84' (pen.)	Stadium: Mezőkövesdi Városi Stadion; Attendance: 1,670; Referee: Balázs Berke

31 October 2020 9	Budapest Honvéd	1 – 1	Mezőkövesd	Budapest
17:00 CET	Hidi 69'	Report	Berecz 62'	Stadium: Hidegkuti Nándor Stadion; Attendance: 1,582; Referee: Mihály Kárpály

8 November 2020 10	Ferencváros	3 – 0	Mezőkövesd	Budapest
17:00 CET	Nguen 15'; Boli 20'; Uzuni 46'	Report		Stadium: Groupama Arena; Attendance: 2,921; Referee: Zoltán Iványi

21 November 2020 11	Mezőkövesd	0 – 1	MTK Budapest	Mezőkövesd
17:00 CET		Report	Ikenne 21'	Stadium: Mezőkövesdi Városi Stadion; Attendance: x Referee: József Erdős

29 November 2020 12	Mezőkövesd	2 – 1	Diósgyőr	Mezőkövesd
14:05 CET	Cseri 21' (pen.); Serderov 85'	Report	Dražić 90' (pen.)	Stadium: Városi Stadion; Attendance: x Referee: Zoltán Iványi

5 December 2020 13	Zalaegerszeg	3 – 0	Mezőkövesd	Zalaegerszeg
14:45 CET	Zimonyi 19'; Szépe 44'; Szánthó 80'	Report		Stadium: ZTE Aréna; Attendance: x Referee: Gergő Bogár

13 December 2020 14	Mezőkövesd	4 – 3	Paks	Mezőkövesd
14:30 CET	Karnitsky 20'; Beširović 39'; Vutov 52'; Pillár 79'	Report	Ádám 37' (pen.), 57'; Bognár 90+3'	Stadium: Városi Stadion; Attendance: x Referee: Tamás Bognár

16 December 2020 15	Budafok	0 – 1	Mezőkövesd	Budapest
20:15 CET		Report	Jurina 81'	Stadium: Promontor utcai Stadion; Attendance: x Referee: Péter Antal

20 December 2020 16	Mezőkövesd	1 – 0	Puskás Akadémia	Mezőkövesd
14:30 CET	Beširović 7'	Report		Stadium: Városi Stadion; Attendance: x Referee: Csaba Pintér

23 January 2021 17	Kisvárda	0 – 0	Mezőkövesd	Kisvárda
14:30 CET		Report		Stadium: Várkerti Stadion; Attendance: x Referee: Balázs Berke

30 January 2021 18	Mezőkövesd	3 – 2	Újpest	Mezőkövesd
14:45 CET	Katanec 44'; Beširović 59'; Cseri 81' (pen.)	Report	Szakály 75'; Beridze 78'	Stadium: Városi Stadion; Attendance: x Referee: Sándor Andó-Szabó

2 February 2021 19	Fehérvár	0 – 0	Mezőkövesd	Székesfehérvár
20:00 CET		Report		Stadium: MOL Aréna Sóstó; Attendance: x Referee: József Erdős
Note: COVID-19 pandemic in Hungary

6 February 2021 20	Mezőkövesd	2 – 1	Budapest Honvéd	Mezőkövesd
17:00 CET	Vadnai 23'; Jurina 27'	Report	Gale 85'	Stadium: Mezőkövesdi Városi Stadion; Attendance: x Referee: Mihály Káprály
Note: COVID-19 pandemic in Hungary

14 February 2021 21	Mezőkövesd	2 – 2	Ferencváros	Mezőkövesd
14:30 CET	Beširović 62'; Jurina 71'	Report	Somália 32'; Boli 50'	Stadium: Mezőkövesdi Városi Stadion; Attendance: x Referee: Sándor Andó-Szabó
Note: COVID-19 pandemic in Hungary

19 February 2021 22	MTK Budapest	0 – 0	Mezőkövesd	Budapest
20:00 CET		Report		Stadium: Hidegkuti Nándor Stadion; Attendance: x Referee: Balázs Berke
Note: COVID-19 pandemic in Hungary

26 February 2021 23	Diósgyőr	2 – 2	Mezőkövesd	Miskolc
20:00 CET	Milović 15'; Ivanovski 85' (pen.)	Report	Chrien 28'; Farkaš 88'	Stadium: DVTK Stadion; Attendance: x Referee: Csaba Pintér
Note: COVID-19 pandemic in Hungary

3 March 2021 24	Mezőkövesd	2 – 0	Zalaegerszeg	Mezőkövesd
15:15 CET	Cseri 30'; Vutov 40'	Report		Stadium: Mezőkövesdi Városi Stadion; Attendance: x Referee: Sándor Andó-Szabó
Note: COVID-19 pandemic in Hungary

6 March 2021 25	Paks	2 – 2	Mezőkövesd	Paks
17:00 CET	Haraszti 75'; Sajbán 85'	Report	Vutov 28'; Beširović 76'	Stadium: Fehérvári úti Stadion; Attendance: x Referee: Csaba Pintér
Note: COVID-19 pandemic in Hungary

14 March 2021 26	Mezőkövesd	2 – 1	Budafok	Mezőkövesd
14:05 CET	Cseri 13'; Vojtuš 60'	Report	Kovács 36' (pen.)	Stadium: Mezőkövesdi Városi Stadion; Attendance: x Referee: Balázs Berke
Note: COVID-19 pandemic in Hungary

4 April 2021 27	Puskás Akadémia	2 – 0	Mezőkövesd	Felcsút
19:15 CET	Géresi 9'; Băluță 90+4'	Report		Stadium: Pancho Aréna; Attendance: x Referee: Ferenc Karakó
Note: COVID-19 pandemic in Hungary

9 April 2021 28	Mezőkövesd	0 – 1	Kisvárda	Mezőkövesd
20:00 CET		Report	Bumba 20' (pen.)	Stadium: Mezőkövesdi Városi Stadion; Attendance: x Referee: Zoltán Iványi
Note: COVID-19 pandemic in Hungary

17 April 2021 29	Újpest	3 – 0	Mezőkövesd	Budapest
14:45 CET	Kastrati 9'; Mitrović 43'; Tallo 60'	Report		Stadium: Szusza Ferenc Stadion; Attendance: x Referee: Gergő Bogár
Note: COVID-19 pandemic in Hungary

21 April 2021 30	Mezőkövesd	1 – 3	Fehérvár	Mezőkövesd
20:00 CET	Vutov 13'	Report	Bamgboye 59'; Dárdai 65'; Szabó 90+3'	Stadium: Mezőkövesdi Városi Stadion; Attendance: x Referee: Tamás Bognár
Note: COVID-19 pandemic in Hungary

25 April 2021 31	Budapest Honvéd	2 – 2	Mezőkövesd	Budapest
19:30 CEST	Batik 51'; Balogh 89'	Report	Cseri 16'; Jurina 83'	Stadium: Hidegkuti Nándor Stadion; Attendance: x Referee: Csaba Pintér
Note: COVID-19 pandemic in Hungary

1 May 20121 32	Ferencváros	2 – 1	Mezőkövesd	Budapest
19:30 CEST	Nguen 24', 89'	Report	Beširović 64'	Stadium: Groupama Arena; Attendance: 3,627; Referee: Balázs Berke
Note: COVID-19 pandemic in Hungary

7 May 2021 33	Mezőkövesd	5 – 1	MTK Budapest	Mezőkövesd
20:00 CEST	Jurina 17'; Nagy 42'; Ferreira 53' (o.g.); Vayda 62'; Vutov 64'	Report	Varga 79' (pen.)	Stadium: Mezőkövesdi Városi Stadion; Attendance: 358; Referee: Mihály Káprály
Note: COVID-19 pandemic in Hungary

=== Hungarian Cup ===
20 September 2020 Round 6	Mándok	1 – 8	Mezőkövesd	Mándok
15:00 CEST	Erős 61'	Report	Berecz 18', 40', 80' (pen.); Jurina 32'; Boryachuk 64', 87', 89'; Vayda 68'	Stadium: Városi Sportpálya; Attendance: 500; Referee: Roland Veizer

28 October 2020 Round of 64	Gyöngyös	1 – 4	Mezőkövesd	Gyöngyös
12:30 CET	Molnár 3'	Report	Szeles 16'; Jurina 38'; Nagy 60'; Katanec 73'	Stadium: Kömeli Károly Sporttelep; Attendance: 250; Referee: Tamás Berényi

10 February 2021 Round of 32	Ajka	1 – 2	Mezőkövesd	Ajka
15:00 CET	Szűcs 36'	Report	Pillár 39'; Martic 76'	Stadium: Városi Stadion; Attendance: x Referee: Ádám Németh
Note: COVID-19 pandemic in Hungary

23 February 2021 Round of 16	Mezőkövesd	2 – 0	Diósgyőr	Mezőkövesd
17:30 CET	Rui Pedro 37'; Vutov 42'	Report		Stadium: Mezőkövesdi Városi Stadion; Attendance: x Referee: Sándor Szilágyi
Note: COVID-19 pandemic in Hungary

9 March 2021 Quarter-final	Újpest	1 – 1 (a.e.t.) (5–4 p)	Mezőkövesd	Budapest
17:30 CET	Perošević 73'	Report	Vadnai 32'	Stadium: Szusza Ferenc Stadion; Attendance: x Referee: Gábor Oláh
	Penalties
	Perošević (penalty scored); Szakály (penalty scored); Mitrović (penalty scored); Antonov (penalty scored); Kastrati (penalty missed); Stieber (penalty scored)		Vojtuš (penalty missed); Rui Pedro (penalty scored); Vayda (penalty scored); Jurina (penalty scored); Martic (penalty scored); Beširović (penalty missed)
Note: COVID-19 pandemic in Hungary

== Statistics ==
=== Appearances and goals ===
Last updated on 10 May 2021.

No.	Pos	Nat	Player	Total		OTP Bank Liga		Hungarian Cup	
No.	Pos	Nat	Player	Apps	Goals	Apps	Goals	Apps	Goals
1	GK	(Ukraine) UKR	Danylo Ryabenko	5	-6	2	-3	3	-3
3	DF	(Greece) GRE	Konstantinos Dimitriou	1	0	1	0	0	0
4	DF	(Hungary) HUN	Gábor Eperjesi	11	0	10	0	1	0
5	DF	(Ukraine) UKR	Andriy Nesterov	20	0	17	0	3	0
7	FW	(Hungary) HUN	Márk Bencze	2	0	1	0	1	0
8	FW	(Georgia (country)) GEO	Nodar Kavtaradze	6	0	6	0	0	0
9	MF	(Slovakia) SVK	Martin Chrien	19	1	16	1	3	0
10	MF	(Bosnia and Herzegovina) BIH	Dino Beširović	32	6	30	6	2	0
11	FW	(Slovakia) SVK	Jakub Vojtuš	18	1	15	1	3	0
12	DF	(Georgia (country)) GEO	Luka Lakvekheliani	11	0	9	0	2	0
14	MF	(Belarus) BLR	Alyaksandr Karnitsky	29	1	24	1	5	0
17	DF	(Slovakia) SVK	Róbert Pillár	15	2	12	1	3	1
18	MF	(Austria) AUT	Manuel Martic	20	1	17	0	3	1
20	DF	(Hungary) HUN	Richárd Guzmics	3	0	3	0	0	0
21	MF	(Croatia) CRO	Karlo Kamenar	4	0	3	0	1	0
22	DF	(Serbia) SRB	Daniel Farkaš	31	1	28	1	3	0
23	DF	(Hungary) HUN	Dániel Vadnai	26	2	22	1	4	1
24	MF	(Hungary) HUN	Tamás Cseri	36	6	32	6	4	0
25	GK	(Hungary) HUN	Péter Szappanos	34	-44	32	-43	2	-1
27	FW	(Mali) MLI	Ulysse Diallo	3	0	3	0	0	0
28	FW	(Russia) RUS	Serder Serderov	14	2	13	2	1	0
30	MF	(Portugal) POR	Rui Pedro	12	1	10	0	2	1
31	MF	(Hungary) HUN	Dávid Barczi	2	0	2	0	0	0
32	DF	(Croatia) CRO	Matija Katanec	28	2	24	1	4	1
39	FW	(Bulgaria) BUL	Antonio Vutov	30	6	27	5	3	1
55	MF	(Hungary) HUN	Dániel Nagy	29	2	25	1	4	1
77	MF	(Ukraine) UKR	Shandor Vayda	27	2	22	1	5	1
88	DF	(Hungary) HUN	Tamás Szeles	15	1	13	0	2	1
97	MF	(Ukraine) UKR	Mykhaylo Meskhi	11	0	10	0	1	0
99	FW	(Bosnia and Herzegovina) BIH	Marin Jurina	37	8	32	6	5	2
Youth players:
8	MF	(Hungary) HUN	Máté Tóth	1	0	0	0	1	0
16	GK	(Serbia) SRB	Branimir Aleksić	0	0	0	0	0	0
30	GK	(Hungary) HUN	Eduárd Fedinisinec	0	0	0	0	0	0
Out to loan:
26	DF	(Hungary) HUN	Márk Jagodics	4	0	4	0	0	0
Players no longer at the club:
9	FW	(Ukraine) UKR	Andriy Boryachuk	8	3	6	0	2	3
13	MF	(Hungary) HUN	Zsombor Berecz	24	7	21	4	3	3

=== Top scorers ===
Includes all competitive matches. The list is sorted by shirt number when total goals are equal.

Last updated on 10 May 2021

Position	Nation	Number	Name	OTP Bank Liga	Hungarian Cup	Total
1	(Bosnia and Herzegovina)	99	Marin Jurina	6	2	8
2	(Hungary)	13	Zsombor Berecz	4	3	7
3	(Hungary)	24	Tamás Cseri	6	0	6
4	(Bosnia and Herzegovina)	10	Dino Beširović	6	0	6
5	(Bulgaria)	39	Antonio Vutov	5	1	6
6	(Ukraine)	9	Andriy Boryachuk	0	3	3
7	(Russia)	28	Serder Serderov	2	0	2
8	(Croatia)	32	Matija Katanec	1	1	2
9	(Slovakia)	17	Róbert Pillár	1	1	2
10	(Hungary)	23	Dániel Vadnai	1	1	2
11	(Hungary)	55	Dániel Nagy	1	1	2
12	(Ukraine)	77	Shandor Vayda	1	1	2
13	(Belarus)	14	Alyaksandr Karnitsky	1	0	1
14	(Slovakia)	9	Martin Chrien	1	0	1
15	(Serbia)	22	Daniel Farkaš	1	0	1
16	(Slovakia)	11	Jakub Vojtuš	1	0	1
17	(Hungary)	88	Tamás Szeles	0	1	1
18	(Austria)	18	Manuel Martic	0	1	1
19	(Portugal)	30	Rui Pedro	0	1	1
/	/	/	Own Goals	2	0	2
			TOTALS	40	17	57

=== Disciplinary record ===
Includes all competitive matches. Players with 1 card or more included only.

Last updated on 10 May 2021

Position	Nation	Number	Name	OTP Bank Liga		Hungarian Cup		Total (Hu Total)	
Position	Nation	Number	Name	Yellow card	Red card	Yellow card	Red card	Yellow card	Red card
DF	(Hungary)	4	Gábor Eperjesi	1	0	0	0	1 (1)	0 (0)
DF	(Ukraine)	5	Andriy Nesterov	4	0	0	0	4 (4)	0 (0)
FW	(Georgia (country))	8	Nodar Kavtaradze	1	0	0	0	1 (1)	0 (0)
MF	(Slovakia)	9	Martin Chrien	1	0	1	0	2 (1)	0 (0)
FW	(Ukraine)	9	Andriy Boryachuk	2	0	0	0	2 (2)	0 (0)
MF	(Bosnia and Herzegovina)	10	Dino Beširović	7	0	0	0	7 (7)	0 (0)
FW	(Slovakia)	11	Jakub Vojtuš	3	0	0	0	3 (3)	0 (0)
DF	(Georgia (country))	12	Luka Lakvekheliani	3	0	0	0	3 (3)	0 (0)
MF	(Hungary)	13	Zsombor Berecz	2	0	0	0	2 (2)	0 (0)
MF	(Belarus)	14	Alyaksandr Karnitsky	3	1	0	0	3 (3)	1 (1)
DF	(Slovakia)	17	Róbert Pillár	2	1	1	0	3 (2)	1 (1)
MF	(Austria)	18	Manuel Martic	6	0	1	0	7 (6)	0 (0)
DF	(Serbia)	22	Daniel Farkaš	9	0	1	0	10 (9)	0 (0)
DF	(Hungary)	23	Dániel Vadnai	4	0	1	0	5 (4)	0 (0)
MF	(Hungary)	24	Tamás Cseri	6	0	0	0	6 (6)	0 (0)
GK	(Hungary)	25	Péter Szappanos	4	0	1	0	5 (4)	0 (0)
DF	(Hungary)	26	Márk Jagodics	2	0	0	0	2 (2)	0 (0)
MF	(Portugal)	30	Rui Pedro	1	0	0	0	1 (1)	0 (0)
DF	(Croatia)	32	Matija Katanec	7	0	0	0	7 (7)	0 (0)
FW	(Bulgaria)	39	Antonio Vutov	6	0	1	0	7 (6)	0 (0)
MF	(Hungary)	55	Dániel Nagy	2	0	0	0	2 (2)	0 (0)
MF	(Ukraine)	77	Shandor Vayda	1	0	1	0	2 (1)	0 (0)
DF	(Hungary)	88	Tamás Szeles	3	0	1	0	4 (3)	0 (0)
MF	(Ukraine)	97	Mykhaylo Meskhi	0	1	1	0	1 (0)	1 (1)
FW	(Bosnia and Herzegovina)	99	Marin Jurina	5	0	0	0	5 (5)	0 (0)
			TOTALS	85	3	10	0	95 (85)	3 (3)

=== Overall ===
Games played	38 (33 OTP Bank Liga and 5 Hungarian Cup)
Games won	15 (11 OTP Bank Liga and 4 Hungarian Cup)
Games drawn	10 (9 OTP Bank Liga and 1 Hungarian Cup)
Games lost	13 (13 OTP Bank Liga and 0 Hungarian Cup)
Goals scored	57
Goals conceded	50
Goal difference	+7
Yellow cards	95
Red cards	3
Worst discipline	(Serbia) Daniel Farkaš (10 (yellow card) , 0 (red card) )
Best result	8–1 (H) v Mándok - Hungarian Cup - 20-9-2020
Worst result	0–3 (A) v Ferencváros - Nemzeti Bajnokság I - 8-11-2020
Worst result	0–3 (A) v Zalaegerszeg - Nemzeti Bajnokság I - 5-12-2020
Worst result	0–3 (A) v Újpest - Nemzeti Bajnokság I - 17-4-2021
Most appearances	(Bosnia and Herzegovina) Marin Jurina (38 appearances)
Top scorer	(Bosnia and Herzegovina) Marin Jurina (8 goals)
Points	55/114 (48.24%)

Last updated: 10 May 2021
