= 2018–19 Mezőkövesdi SE season =

Mezőkövesd
2018–19 season
- Chairman: Attila Tállai
- Manager: Attila Kuttor
- NB 1: 6th
- Hungarian Cup: Quarter-final
- Top goalscorer: League: Stefan Dražić (11); All: Stefan Dražić (14)
- Highest home attendance: 4,032 vs Ferencváros (13 April 2019)
- Lowest home attendance: 827 vs Szombathelyi Haladás (20 February 2019)
Home colours	Away colours

The 2018–19 season was Mezőkövesdi SE's 4th competitive season, 3rd consecutive season in the OTP Bank Liga and 41st year in existence as a football club.

== First team squad ==
Note: Flags indicate national team as defined under FIFA eligibility rules; some limited exceptions apply. Players may hold more than one non-FIFA nationality.

No.	Pos.	Nation	Player
1	GK	HUN	Dávid Dombó
4	MF	CRO	Frano Mlinar
6	MF	CMR	Patrick Mevoungou
7	MF	HUN	Bence Tóth (captain)
8	MF	HUN	Richárd Nagy
10	FW	HUN	Márk Koszta
11	MF	HUN	Dénes Szakály
13	DF	HUN	Pál Lázár
15	MF	HUN	Bence Iszlai
17	DF	SVK	Róbert Pillár
21	FW	SRB	Stefan Dražić
22	DF	SRB	Daniel Farkaš

No.	Pos.	Nation	Player
23	DF	HUN	Dániel Vadnai
24	FW	HUN	Tamás Cseri
25	GK	HUN	Péter Szappanos
32	DF	CRO	Matija Katanec
39	DF	SVK	Dávid Hudák
41	DF	HUN	Attila Szalai
44	GK	HUN	Balázs Egyed
70	MF	HUN	Erik Silye (on loan from Ferencváros)
77	MF	UKR	Shandor Vayda
88	DF	HUN	Tamás Szeles
97	MF	UKR	Mykhaylo Meskhi
—	MF	HUN	Máté Tóth (on loan from Haladás)

== Transfers ==
=== Summer ===
In: Note: Flags indicate national team as defined under FIFA eligibility rules; some limited exceptions apply. Players may hold more than one non-FIFA nationality.

No.	Pos.	Nation	Player
6	MF	CMR	Patrick Mevoungou (from Puskás Akadémia)
8	MF	HUN	Richárd Nagy (from Vác)
8	MF	HUN	Máté Tóth (loan from Haladás)
9	FW	BRA	André Alves (from (Cyprus) Anorthosis)
11	MF	HUN	Dénes Szakály (from Paks)
12	GK	HUN	Viktor Szentpéteri (from MTK Budapest)
25	GK	HUN	Péter Szappanos (from Zalaegerszeg)
33	MF	HUN	Gábor Molnár (loan from Puskás Akadémia)
70	DF	HUN	Erik Silye (loan from Ferencváros)
77	MF	UKR	Shandor Vayda (from Balmazújváros)
97	MF	UKR	Mykhaylo Meskhi (from (Ukraine) Stal Kamianske)
99	DF	HUN	Dominik Wieland (loan from Ferencváros U-19)

Out: Note: Flags indicate national team as defined under FIFA eligibility rules; some limited exceptions apply. Players may hold more than one non-FIFA nationality.

No.	Pos.	Nation	Player
3	DF	HUN	Dominik Fótyik (to Kazincbarcika)
4	MF	CRO	Frano Mlinar
5	MF	HUN	Bálint Oláh (loan to Budafok)
6	DF	HUN	Gergő Gohér (to Budafok)
8	FW	HUN	Roland Baracskai (loan to Győr)
8	MF	HUN	Richárd Nagy (loan to Kaposvár)
9	FW	HUN	Csanád Novák (loan to Zalaegerszeg)
11	MF	HUN	István Bognár (to MTK Budapest)
13	GK	SVK	Ladislav Rybánsky (to Békéscsaba)
16	MF	HUN	István Csirmaz (loan to Cegléd)
23	MF	CMR	Fabrice Onana
27	MF	SVK	Patrik Mišák (loan return to (Poland) Nieciecza)
31	GK	HUN	Tamás Horváth (to Győr)
85	GK	HUN	Pál Tarczy (to (Austria) Großpetersdorf)
99	MF	HUN	Márk Murai (to Vác)

=== Winter ===
In: Note: Flags indicate national team as defined under FIFA eligibility rules; some limited exceptions apply. Players may hold more than one non-FIFA nationality.

No.	Pos.	Nation	Player
4	DF	HUN	Gábor Eperjesi (from Diósgyőr)
8	FW	HUN	Roland Baracskai (loan return from Győr)
9	MF	HUN	László Pekár (from Nyíregyháza)
26	MF	HUN	Lajos Bertus (from Paks)
40	MF	NIG	Amadou Moutari (from Ferencváros)
71	FW	HUN	Filip Dragóner (from Nyíregyháza)

Out: Note: Flags indicate national team as defined under FIFA eligibility rules; some limited exceptions apply. Players may hold more than one non-FIFA nationality.

No.	Pos.	Nation	Player
8	FW	HUN	Roland Baracskai (loan to Csákvár)
9	FW	BRA	André Alves
18	MF	HUN	Zoltán Varjas (loan to Cegléd)
14	FW	HUN	Botond Földi (loan to Cegléd)
20	FW	HUN	László Varjas (loan to Vác)
99	MF	ROU	Dominik Wieland (loan to Vác)

== Statistics ==
=== Appearances and goals ===
Last updated on 19 May 2019.

No.	Pos	Nat	Player	Total		OTP Bank Liga		Hungarian Cup	
No.	Pos	Nat	Player	Apps	Goals	Apps	Goals	Apps	Goals
1	GK	(Hungary) HUN	Dávid Dombó	17	-18	12	-15	5	-3
4	DF	(Hungary) HUN	Gábor Eperjesi	11	0	7	0	4	0
6	MF	(Cameroon) CMR	Patrick Mevoungou	14	0	13	0	1	0
7	MF	(Hungary) HUN	Bence Tóth	15	0	10	0	5	0
8	MF	(Hungary) HUN	Máté Tóth	5	0	2	0	3	0
9	MF	(Hungary) HUN	László Pekár	11	2	10	2	1	0
10	FW	(Hungary) HUN	Márk Koszta	26	7	22	4	4	3
11	MF	(Hungary) HUN	Dénes Szakály	13	2	10	0	3	2
15	MF	(Hungary) HUN	Bence Iszlai	10	0	8	0	2	0
17	DF	(Slovakia) SVK	Róbert Pillár	32	1	32	1	0	0
21	FW	(Serbia) SRB	Stefan Dražić	36	14	31	11	5	3
22	DF	(Serbia) SRB	Daniel Farkaš	24	0	22	0	2	0
23	MF	(Hungary) HUN	Dániel Vadnai	29	1	26	1	3	0
24	MF	(Hungary) HUN	Tamás Cseri	32	4	29	4	3	0
25	GK	(Hungary) HUN	Péter Szappanos	24	-25	22	-25	2	0
26	MF	(Hungary) HUN	Lajos Bertus	13	0	12	0	1	0
32	DF	(Croatia) CRO	Matija Katanec	23	0	20	0	3	0
33	FW	(Hungary) HUN	Gábor Molnár	28	9	21	8	7	1
39	DF	(Slovakia) SVK	Dávid Hudák	9	0	3	0	6	0
40	MF	(Niger) NIG	Amadou Moutari	14	3	10	3	4	0
41	DF	(Hungary) HUN	Attila Szalai	30	2	25	2	5	0
70	MF	(Hungary) HUN	Erik Silye	24	1	20	0	4	1
71	FW	(Hungary) HUN	Filip Dragóner	5	1	2	1	3	0
77	MF	(Ukraine) UKR	Shandor Vayda	34	6	30	5	4	1
88	DF	(Hungary) HUN	Tamás Szeles	25	1	24	1	1	0
97	MF	(Ukraine) UKR	Mykhaylo Meskhi	28	0	24	0	4	0
Out to loan:
18	MF	(Hungary) HUN	Zoltán Varjas	3	0	0	0	3	0
20	FW	(Hungary) HUN	László Varjas	3	0	1	0	2	0
45	FW	(Hungary) HUN	Botond Földi	3	2	1	0	2	2
99	MF	(Romania) ROU	Dominik Wieland	2	0	0	0	2	0
Players no longer at the club:
9	FW	(Brazil) BRA	André Alves	5	1	3	0	2	1

=== Top scorers ===
Includes all competitive matches. The list is sorted by shirt number when total goals are equal.

Last updated on 19 May 2019

Position	Nation	Number	Name	OTP Bank Liga	Hungarian Cup	Total
1	(Serbia)	21	Stefan Dražić	11	3	14
2	(Hungary)	33	Gábor Molnár	8	1	9
3	(Hungary)	10	Márk Koszta	4	3	7
4	(Ukraine)	77	Shandor Vayda	5	1	6
5	(Hungary)	24	Tamás Cseri	4	0	4
6	(Niger)	40	Amadou Moutari	3	0	3
7	(Hungary)	41	Attila Szalai	2	0	2
8	(Hungary)	9	László Pekár	2	0	2
9	(Hungary)	11	Dénes Szakály	0	2	2
10	(Hungary)	45	Botond Földi	0	2	2
11	(Slovakia)	17	Róbert Pillár	1	0	1
12	(Hungary)	88	Tamás Szeles	1	0	1
13	(Hungary)	23	Dániel Vadnai	1	0	1
14	(Hungary)	71	Filip Dragóner	1	0	1
15	(Brazil)	9	André Alves	0	1	1
16	(Hungary)	70	Erik Silye	0	1	1
/	/	/	Own Goals	2	0	2
			TOTALS	45	14	59

=== Disciplinary record ===
Includes all competitive matches. Players with 1 card or more included only.

Last updated on 19 May 2019

Position	Nation	Number	Name	OTP Bank Liga		Hungarian Cup		Total (Hu Total)	
Position	Nation	Number	Name	Booked	Sent off (straight red)	Booked	Sent off (straight red)	Booked	Sent off (straight red)
DF	(Hungary)	4	Gábor Eperjesi	1	0	0	1	1 (1)	1 (0)
MF	(Cameroon)	6	Patrick Mevoungou	3	0	0	0	3 (3)	0 (0)
MF	(Hungary)	7	Bence Tóth	2	0	1	0	3 (2)	0 (0)
MF	(Hungary)	8	Máté Tóth	0	0	1	0	1 (0)	0 (0)
FW	(Brazil)	9	André Alves	1	0	0	0	1 (1)	0 (0)
MF	(Hungary)	9	László Pekár	1	0	0	0	1 (1)	0 (0)
FW	(Hungary)	10	Márk Koszta	2	0	1	0	3 (2)	0 (0)
MF	(Hungary)	15	Bence Iszlai	4	0	1	0	5 (4)	0 (0)
DF	(Slovakia)	17	Róbert Pillár	3	0	0	0	3 (3)	0 (0)
FW	(Serbia)	21	Stefan Dražić	2	0	0	0	2 (2)	0 (0)
DF	(Serbia)	22	Daniel Farkaš	6	0	0	0	6 (6)	0 (0)
MF	(Hungary)	23	Dániel Vadnai	5	0	0	0	5 (5)	0 (0)
MF	(Hungary)	24	Tamás Cseri	7	0	0	0	7 (7)	0 (0)
GK	(Hungary)	25	Péter Szappanos	3	0	1	0	4 (3)	0 (0)
MF	(Hungary)	26	Lajos Bertus	2	0	0	0	2 (2)	0 (0)
MF	(Croatia)	32	Matija Katanec	3	0	0	0	3 (3)	0 (0)
FW	(Hungary)	33	Gábor Molnár	2	0	2	0	4 (2)	0 (0)
MF	(Niger)	40	Amadou Moutari	0	0	3	0	3 (0)	0 (0)
DF	(Hungary)	41	Attila Szalai	3	1	1	0	4 (3)	1 (1)
MF	(Hungary)	70	Erik Silye	2	0	1	0	3 (2)	0 (0)
FW	(Hungary)	71	Filip Dragóner	0	0	1	0	1 (0)	0 (0)
MF	(Ukraine)	77	Shandor Vayda	2	0	1	0	3 (2)	0 (0)
DF	(Hungary)	88	Tamás Szeles	5	1	0	0	5 (5)	1 (1)
MF	(Ukraine)	97	Mykhaylo Meskhi	8	0	0	0	8 (8)	0 (0)
			TOTALS	67	2	14	1	81 (67)	3 (2)

=== Overall ===
Games played	40 (33 OTP Bank Liga and 7 Hungarian Cup)
Games won	16 (12 OTP Bank Liga and 4 Hungarian Cup)
Games drawn	9 (8 OTP Bank Liga and 1 Hungarian Cup)
Games lost	15 (13 OTP Bank Liga and 2 Hungarian Cup)
Goals scored	59
Goals conceded	43
Goal difference	+16
Yellow cards	81
Red cards	3
Worst discipline	(Ukraine) Mykhaylo Meskhi (8 (yellow card) , 0 (red card) )
Best result	6–0 (A) v III. Kerület - Magyar Kupa - 4-12-2018
Worst result	1–3 (A) v MOL Vidi - Nemzeti Bajnokság I - 26-09-2018
Worst result	0–2 (A) v Puskás Akadémia - Nemzeti Bajnokság I - 15-12-2018
Most appearances	(Serbia) Stefan Dražić (36 appearances)
Top scorer	(Serbia) Stefan Dražić (14 goals)
Points	57/120 (47.5%)

Last updated: 19 May 2019

== Nemzeti Bajnokság I ==
=== Matches ===
21 July 2018 1	Mezőkövesd	3 – 1	Paks	Mezőkövesd, Borsod-Abaúj-Zemplén County
20:15 CEST	Dražić 30'; Szalai 39'; Kulcsár 81' (o.g.)	Report	Kulcsár 33'	Stadium: Mezőkövesdi Városi Stadion; Attendance: 1,977; Referee: (Hungary) József Erdős

28 July 2018 2	Debrecen	1 – 1	Mezőkövesd	Debrecen, Hajdú-Bihar County
19:30 CEST	Kinyik 87'	Report	Dražić 71'	Stadium: Nagyerdei Stadion; Attendance: 3,228; Referee: (Hungary) Csaba Pintér

26 September 2018 3	MOL Vidi	3 – 1	Mezőkövesd	Felcsút, Fejér County
20:00 CEST	Juhász 19'; Katanec 22' (o.g.); Šćepović 65'	Report	Vayda 90+4'	Stadium: Pancho Arena; Attendance: 696; Referee: (Hungary) Balázs Berke

12 August 2018 4	Mezőkövesd	0 – 1	Budapest Honvéd	Mezőkövesd, Borsod-Abaúj-Zemplén County
19:00 CEST		Report	Holender 51'	Stadium: Mezőkövesdi Városi Stadion; Attendance: 3,248; Referee: (Hungary) József Erdős

18 August 2018 5	Újpest	1 – 1	Mezőkövesd	Budapest, Pest County
19:30 CEST	Zsótér 89'	Report	Szalai 4'	Stadium: Szusza Ferenc Stadion; Attendance: 2,075; Referee: (Hungary) Csaba Pintér

25 August 2018 6	Mezőkövesd	0 – 1	Ferencváros	Mezőkövesd, Borsod-Abaúj-Zemplén County
19:30 CEST		Report	Böde 90+1'	Stadium: Mezőkövesdi Városi Stadion; Attendance: 4,015; Referee: (Hungary) Zoltán Iványi

1 September 2018 7	Mezőkövesd	2 – 0	Puskás Akadémia	Mezőkövesd, Borsod-Abaúj-Zemplén County
19:30 CEST	Dražić 17'; Pillár 78'	Report		Stadium: Mezőkövesdi Városi Stadion; Attendance: 2,155; Referee: (Hungary) Gergő Bogár

15 September 2018 8	Mezőkövesd	4 – 2	Diósgyőr	Mezőkövesd, Borsod-Abaúj-Zemplén County
17:00 CEST	Szeles 7'; Cseri 9'; Vayda 11', 80'	Report	Tajti 50'; Makrai 68'	Stadium: Mezőkövesdi Városi Stadion; Attendance: 2,600; Referee: (Hungary) Balázs Berke

29 September 2018 9	MTK Budapest	2 – 2	Mezőkövesd	Budapest, Pest County
17:00 CEST	Bognár 7'; Kanta 89' (pen.)	Report	Molnár 63'; Dražić 80'	Stadium: Hidegkuti Nándor Stadion; Attendance: 1,852; Referee: (Hungary) Ferenc Karakó

6 October 2018 10	Mezőkövesd	2 – 0	Szombathelyi Haladás	Mezőkövesd, Borsod-Abaúj-Zemplén County
17:00 CEST	Molnár 6'; Koszta 90+2' (pen.)	Report		Stadium: Mezőkövesdi Városi Stadion; Attendance: 2,168; Referee: (Hungary) Sándor Andó-Szabó

20 October 2018 11	Kisvárda	1 – 2	Mezőkövesd	Kisvárda, Szabolcs-Szatmár-Bereg County
17:00 CEST	Vári 13'	(Report)	Molnár 66', 79'	Stadium: Várkert Sportpálya; Attendance: 1,910; Referee: (Hungary) Zoltán Iványi

27 October 2018 12	Paks	2 – 1	Mezőkövesd	Paks, Tolna County
17:00 CEST	Hahn 42'; Gévay 70'	(Report)	Molnár 90+1'	Stadium: Fehérvári úti Stadion; Attendance: 800; Referee: (Hungary) József Erdős

3 November 2018 13	Mezőkövesd	2 – 2	Debrecen	Mezőkövesd, Borsod-Abaúj-Zemplén County
17:00 CET	Koszta 18'; Molnár 72'	Report	Könyves 4'; Takács 20'	Stadium: Mezőkövesdi Városi Stadion; Attendance: 2,532; Referee: (Hungary) Tamás Bognár

11 November 2018 14	Mezőkövesd	1 – 0	MOL Vidi	Mezőkövesd, Borsod-Abaúj-Zemplén County
15:30 CET	Koszta 67'	Report		Stadium: Mezőkövesdi Városi Stadion; Attendance: 2,456; Referee: (Hungary) Péter Solymosi

24 November 2018 15	Budapest Honvéd	1 – 1	Mezőkövesd	Budapest, Pest County
17:00 CET	Holender 64'	Report	Dražić 76'	Stadium: Hidegkuti Nándor Stadion; Attendance: 1,556; Referee: (Hungary) Csaba Pintér

1 December 2018 16	Mezőkövesd	0 – 0	Újpest	Mezőkövesd, Borsod-Abaúj-Zemplén County
17:00 CET		Report		Stadium: Mezőkövesdi Városi Stadion; Attendance: 1,256; Referee: (Hungary) Balázs Berke

8 December 2018 17	Ferencváros	3 – 2	Mezőkövesd	Budapest, Pest County
17:00 CET	Lanzafame 1', 79'; Varga 88' (pen.)	Report	Cseri 83' (pen.); Vadnai 90+1'	Stadium: Groupama Arena; Attendance: 7,054; Referee: (Hungary) Sándor Andó-Szabó

15 December 2018 18	Puskás Akadémia	2 – 0	Mezőkövesd	Felcsút, Fejér County
17:00 CET	Knežević 60', 69' (pen.)	Report		Stadium: Pancho Arena; Attendance: 418; Referee: (Hungary) Csaba Pintér

2 February 2019 19	Diósgyőr	1 – 1	Mezőkövesd	Miskolc, Borsod-Abaúj-Zemplén County
17:00 CET	Vernes 90+4'	Report	Molnár 52'	Stadium: DVTK Stadion; Attendance: 3,408; Referee: (Hungary) Gergely Szőts

9 February 2019 20	Mezőkövesd	2 – 3	MTK Budapest	Mezőkövesd, Borsod-Abaúj-Zemplén County
17:00 CET	Dražić 28'; Vayda 47'	Report	Katona 32'; Kanta 65'; P. Vass 78'	Stadium: Mezőkövesdi Városi Stadion; Attendance: 1,380; Referee: (Hungary) Balázs Berke

16 February 2019 21	Szombathelyi Haladás	1 – 2	Mezőkövesd	Szombathely, Vas County
17:00 CET	Rui Pedro 23'	Report	Dražić 32', 38'	Stadium: Haladás Sportkomplexum; Attendance: 1,930; Referee: (Hungary) Gergely Szőts

23 February 2019 22	Mezőkövesd	2 – 2	Kisvárda	Mezőkövesd, Borsod-Abaúj-Zemplén County
17:00 CET	Cseri 24' (pen.); Tsoukalas 63' (o.g.)	Report	Tsoukalas 9'; Kravchenko 14'	Stadium: Mezőkövesdi Városi Stadion; Attendance: 2,512; Referee: (Hungary) Péter Solymosi

2 March 2019 23	Mezőkövesd	2 – 0	Paks	Mezőkövesd, Borsod-Abaúj-Zemplén County
17:00 CET	Koszta 67'; Molnár 90+1'	Report		Stadium: Mezőkövesdi Városi Stadion; Attendance: 1,542; Referee: (Hungary) Ferenc Karakó

9 March 2019 24	Debrecen	1 – 0	Mezőkövesd	Debrecen, Hajdú-Bihar County
17:00 CET	Kinyik 37'	Report		Stadium: Nagyerdei Stadion; Attendance: 2,800; Referee: (Hungary) Gergő Bogár

16 March 2019 25	MOL Vidi	1 – 0	Mezőkövesd	Székesfehérvár, Fejér County
17:00 CET	Futács 35'	Report		Stadium: MOL Aréna Sóstó; Attendance: 2,340; Referee: (Hungary) Zoltán Iványi

30 March 2019 26	Mezőkövesd	3 – 1	Budapest Honvéd	Mezőkövesd, Borsod-Abaúj-Zemplén County
13:45 CET	Moutari 71'; Vayda 84'; Dražić 90+2'	Report	Holender 69'	Stadium: Mezőkövesdi Városi Stadion; Attendance: 2,377; Referee: (Hungary) József Erdős

6 April 2019 27	Újpest	2 – 1	Mezőkövesd	Budapest, Pest County
17:00 CEST	Traoré 84' (pen.); Zsótér 85'	Report	Dražić 21'	Stadium: Szusza Ferenc Stadion; Attendance: 2,288; Referee: (Hungary) Péter Solymosi

13 April 2019 28	Mezőkövesd	1 – 2	Ferencváros	Mezőkövesd, Borsod-Abaúj-Zemplén County
17:00 CEST	Dražić 18'	Report	Dvali 48'; Bőle 80'	Stadium: Mezőkövesdi Városi Stadion; Attendance: 4,032; Referee: (Hungary) Ádám Farkas

20 April 2019 29	Puskás Akadémia	1 – 0	Mezőkövesd	Felcsút, Fejér County
17:00 CEST	Knežević 72'	Report		Stadium: Pancho Arena; Attendance: 1,038; Referee: (Hungary) István Vad

27 April 2019 30	Mezőkövesd	3 – 0	Diósgyőr	Mezőkövesd, Borsod-Abaúj-Zemplén County
17:00 CEST	Pekár 18'; Cseri 76'; Moutari 86'	Report		Stadium: Mezőkövesdi Városi Stadion; Attendance: 3,425; Referee: (Hungary) Sándor Andó-Szabó

4 May 2019 31	MTK Budapest	0 – 1	Mezőkövesd	Budapest, Pest County
17:00 CEST		Report	Pekár 50'	Stadium: Hidegkuti Nándor Stadion; Attendance: 1,622; Referee: (Hungary) Zoltán Iványi

11 May 2019 32	Mezőkövesd	1 – 0	Szombathelyi Haladás	Mezőkövesd, Borsod-Abaúj-Zemplén County
17:00 CEST	Moutari 66'	Report		Stadium: Mezőkövesdi Városi Stadion; Attendance: 2,215; Referee: (Hungary) Péter Solymosi

19 May 2019 33	Kisvárda	2 – 1	Mezőkövesd	Kisvárda, Szabolcs-Szatmár-Bereg County
17:00 CEST	Tsoukalas 26', 59'	Report	Dragóner 87'	Stadium: Várkert Sportpálya; Attendance: 3,385; Referee: (Hungary) Viktor Kassai

=== League table ===
Pos	Team	Pld	W	D	L	GF	GA	GD	Pts	Qualification or relegation
4	Honvéd	33	13	10	10	46	38	+8	49	Qualification for the Europa League first qualifying round (Note: Since the winners of the 2018–19 Magyar Kupa, Vidi, qualified for European competition based on league position, the spot awarded to the cup winners (Europa League first qualifying round) was passed to the fourth-placed team.)
5	Újpest	33	12	12	9	38	28	+10	48	
6	Mezőkövesd	33	12	8	13	45	40	+5	44	
7	Puskás Akadémia	33	11	7	15	36	45	−9	40	
8	Paks	33	9	12	12	33	46	−13	39	

Source: Hungarian Football Federation (in Hungarian), Soccerway
Rules for classification: 1) Points; 2) Matches won; 3) Goal difference; 4) Goals scored; 5) Head-to-head points; 6) Head-to-head goal difference; 7) Head-to-head away goals scored; 8) Fair play ranking; 9) Drawing of lots.

=== Results summary ===
Overall								Home						Away					
Pld	W	D	L	GF	GA	GD	Pts	W	D	L	GF	GA	GD	W	D	L	GF	GA	GD
33	12	8	13	45	40	+5	44	9	3	4	28	15	+13	3	5	9	17	25	−8

Last updated: 19 May 2019.
Source: NB1

=== Results by round ===
Round	1	2	3	4	5	6	7	8	9	10	11	12	13	14	15	16	17	18	19	20	21	22	23	24	25	26	27	28	29	30	31	32	33
Ground	H	A	A	H	A	H	H	H	A	H	A	A	H	H	A	H	A	A	A	H	A	H	H	A	A	H	A	H	A	H	A	H	A
Result	W	D	L	L	D	L	W	W	D	W	W	L	D	W	D	D	L	L	D	L	W	D	W	L	L	W	L	L	L	W	W	W	L
Position	3	4	6	7	7	8	6	5	7	6	4	7	6	5	5	5	7	7	7	8	7	8	6	6	6	6	6	6	6	6	6	6	6

Updated to match(es) played on 19 May 2019. Source: Matches
A = Away; H = Home; W = Win; D = Draw; L = Loss

== Hungarian Cup ==
22 September 2018 Round 6	Fővárosi Vízművek	0 – 5	Mezőkövesd	Budapest, Pest County
15:00 CEST		Report	Koszta 53'; Szakály 68', 82'; Alves 71'; Molnár 80'	Stadium: Vízművek Sportpálya; Attendance: 250; Referee: (Hungary) Eszter Urbán

31 October 2018 Round 7	Ménfőcsanak	0 – 1	Mezőkövesd	Győr, Győr-Moson-Sopron County
15:00 CET		Report	Koszta 86'	Stadium: ESK Ménfőcsanak; Attendance: 400; Referee: (Hungary) Gyöngyi Gaál

4 December 2018 Round of 32	III. Kerület	0 – 6	Mezőkövesd	Budapest, Pest County
12:00 CET		Report	Vayda 28'; Silye 51'; Dražić 67', 69'; Földi 72', 85'	Stadium: Hévízi úti Stadion; Attendance: 450; Referee: (Hungary) Gergő Bogár

20 February 2019 Round of 16 (1st leg)	Mezőkövesd	0 – 0	Szombathelyi Haladás	Mezőkövesd, Borsod-Abaúj-Zemplén County
17:00 CET		Report		Stadium: Mezőkövesdi Városi Stadion; Attendance: 872; Referee: (Hungary) Ádám Németh

26 February 2019 Round of 16 (2nd leg)	Szombathelyi Haladás	0 – 1 (0 – 1 agg.)	Mezőkövesd	Szombathely, Vas County
17:30 CET		Report	Koszta 90+1'	Stadium: Haladás Sportkomplexum; Attendance: 1,072; Referee: (Hungary) Attila Molnár

12 March 2019 Quarter-final (leg 1)	Debrecen	1 – 0	Mezőkövesd	Debrecen, Hajdú-Bihar County
18:00 CET	Zsóri 58'	Report		Stadium: Nagyerdei Stadion; Attendance: 1,000; Referee: (Hungary) Sándor Andó-Szabó

2 April 2019 Quarter-final (leg 2)	Mezőkövesd	1 – 2 (1 – 3 agg.)	Debrecen	Mezőkövesd, Borsod-Abaúj-Zemplén County
20:00 CEST	Dražić 45'	Report	Takács 61'; Csősz 87'	Stadium: Mezőkövesdi Városi Stadion; Attendance: 1,456; Referee: (Hungary) Gergely Szőts
