= Eperjesi =

Eperjesi is a Hungarian-language surname. It is a toponymic surname literally meaning "one from Eperjes (Prešov)". Notable people with this surname include:

- Gábor Eperjesi, Hungarian footballer
- Zsigmond Eperjesi (? - 1793), Transylvanian bishop and educator
