= Katanec =

Katanec is a surname. Notable people with the surname include:

- Matija Katanec (born 1990), Croatian footballer
- Srečko Katanec (born 1963), Slovene football manager and player
