= Amadou Moutari =

Nigerien footballer

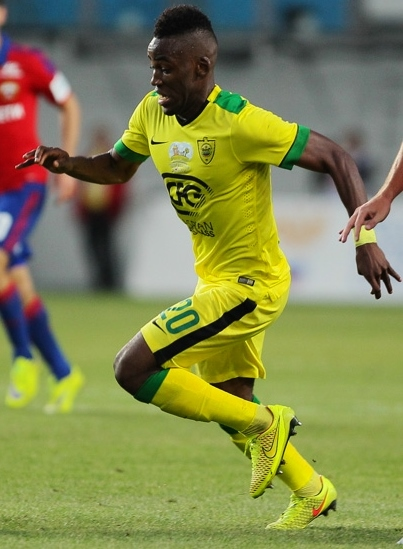
- Moutari with Anzhi in 2015

Personal information
- Full name: Tidjani Amadou Moutari Kalala
- Date of birth: 19 January 1994 (age 32)
- Place of birth: Arlit, Niger
- Height: 1.70 m (5 ft 7 in)
- Position: Midfielder

Team information
- Current team: East Riffa

Senior career*
Years	Team	Apps	(Gls)
2011–2012	Akokana	10	(3)
2012–2014	Le Mans B	5	(0)
2014	Metalurh Donetsk	6	(0)
2014–2017	Anzhi Makhachkala	50	(6)
2017–2019	Ferencváros	40	(8)
2019	Mezőkövesd	10	(3)
2019–2020	Budapest Honvéd	30	(4)
2020–2021	Al-Ain	28	(7)
2021–2022	Al-Fayha	26	(2)
2022–2023	Al-Qadsiah	14	(1)
2023	Tuzlaspor	7	(0)
2023–2024	Al-Sahel		
2024–2025	Al-Faisaly	19	(6)
2025–2026	Al-Naft	30	(2)
2026–	East Riffa	0	(0)

International career^{‡}
2012–	Niger	52	(3)
- * Club domestic league appearances and goals as of 9 September 2026 ‡ National team caps and goals as of 21 November 2023

Tidjani Amadou Moutari Kalala (born 19 January 1994) is a Nigerien professional footballer who plays as a midfielder for Bahraini Premier League club East Riffa.

== Club career ==
Born in Arlit, Moutari spent his early career in Niger and France for Akokana and Le Mans B.

In January 2014, Moutari signed for Metalurh Donetsk in the Ukrainian Premier League, thus becoming the first Nigerien to play in that league.

In July, Moutari signed a four-year contract with Russian club Anzhi Makhachkala.

On 25 January 2017, Moutari signed a contract with Hungarian club Ferencváros.

On 13 February 2019, Moutari signed a contract with Hungarian club Mezőkövesd.

On 29 May, Moutari signed a contract with Hungarian club Budapest Honvéd.

On 10 October 2020, Moutari signed a contract with Saudi club Al-Ain.

On 31 August 2021, Moutari signed a two-year contract with Saudi club Al-Fayha.

On 31 August 2022, Moutari signed a contract with Saudi club Al-Qadsiah. On 31 January 2023, Moutari was released by Al-Qadsiah.

On 6 September 2024, Moutari signed a contract with Jordanian Pro League club Al-Faisaly.

He later played for Iraqi club Al-Naft.

== International career ==
He made his international debut for Niger in 2012, and while competing at the 2012 Africa Cup of Nations broke his leg in a match against Gabon.

== Career statistics ==
=== Club ===
As of 27 June 2020

Appearances and goals by club, season and competition
Club	Season	League			National Cup		Other		Total	
Club	Season	Division	Apps	Goals	Apps	Goals	Apps	Goals	Apps	Goals
Akokana	2011–12	Niger Premier League	10	3	–	–	–	–	10	3
Le Mans B	2011–12	CFA	3	0	0	0	0	0	3	0
Le Mans B	2012–13	CFA	6	0	0	0	0	0	6	0
Le Mans B	Total		9	0	0	0	0	0	0	0
Metalurh Donetsk	2013–14	Ukrainian Premier League	6	0	0	0	0	0	6	0
Anzhi Makhachkala	2014–15	Russian Football National League	29	6	2	1	0	0	31	7
Anzhi Makhachkala	2015–16	Russian Premier League	17	0	1	0	2	0	20	0
Anzhi Makhachkala	2016–17	Russian Premier League	4	0	2	1	0	0	6	1
Anzhi Makhachkala	Total		50	6	5	2	2	0	57	8
Ferencváros	2016–17	Nemzeti Bajnokság I	14	3	7	4	0	0	21	7
Ferencváros	2017–18	Nemzeti Bajnokság I	26	5	2	0	4	0	32	5
Ferencváros	Total		40	8	9	4	4	0	53	12
Mezőkövesd	2018–19	Nemzeti Bajnokság I	10	3	4	0	–	–	14	3
Budapest Honvéd	2019–20	Nemzeti Bajnokság I	30	4	8	1	4	0	42	5
Career total			155	24	26	7	10	0	190	31

=== International ===
As of match played 21 November 2023

Niger	Year	Apps	Goals
Niger	2012	4	0
Niger	2013	1	0
Niger	2014	4	0
Niger	2015	9	0
Niger	2016	2	0
Niger	2017	3	0
Niger	2019	7	1
Niger	2020	1	0
Niger	2021	12	1
Niger	2022	6	0
Niger	2023	2	1
Niger	Total	52	3

=== International goals ===
As of match played 21 November 2023

Niger score listed first, score column indicates score after each Moutari goal.

International goals by date, venue, cap, opponent, score, result and competition
No.	Date	Venue	Cap	Opponent	Score	Result	Competition
1	23 March 2019	Stade Général Seyni Kountché, Niamey, Niger	20	Egypt	1–1	1–1	2019 Africa Cup of Nations qualification
2	22 August 2021	Al Maktoum Stadium, Dubai, United Arab Emirates	37	Sudan	2–0	2–1	Friendly
3	21 November 2023	Marrakesh Stadium, Marrakesh, Morocco	52	Zambia	1–0	2–1	2026 FIFA World Cup qualification
