= Andriy Nesterov =

Ukrainian footballer

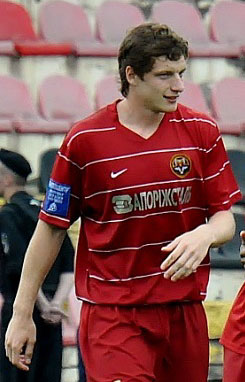

Personal information
- Full name: Andriy Vyacheslavovych Nesterov
- Date of birth: 2 July 1990 (age 36)
- Place of birth: Zaporizhzhia, Soviet Union (now Ukraine)
- Height: 1.88 m (6 ft 2 in)
- Position: Defender

Team information
- Current team: Zviahel
- Number: 5

Youth career
- 2003–2005: Krystal Kherson
- 2005–2007: Metalurh Zaporizhzhia

Senior career*
Years	Team	Apps	(Gls)
2007–2015	Metalurh Zaporizhzhia	87	(3)
2007–2012	→ Metalurh-2 Zaporizhzhia	15	(0)
2015–2016	Zaria Bălți	16	(0)
2016–2019	Karpaty Lviv	55	(5)
2019–2021	Mezőkövesd	38	(1)
2021–2023	Polissya Zhytomyr	22	(2)
2023–	Zviahel	17	(3)
- * Club domestic league appearances and goals as of 14 June 2024

Andriy Vyacheslavovych Nesterov (Ukrainian: Андрій В'ячеславович Нестеров; born 2 July 1990) is a Ukrainian professional footballer who plays as a defender for Zviahel.

== Career ==
=== Early years ===
Nesterov is a product of Krystal Kherson and Metalurh Zaporizhzhia academies.

=== Metalurh Zaporizhzhia ===
He made his debut for Metalurh Zaporizhzhia coming in as a second-half substitute against Metalist Kharkiv on 26 April 2009 in the Ukrainian Premier League.
