= Mezőkövesdi Városi Stadion =

Sports stadium in Mezőkövesd, Hungary

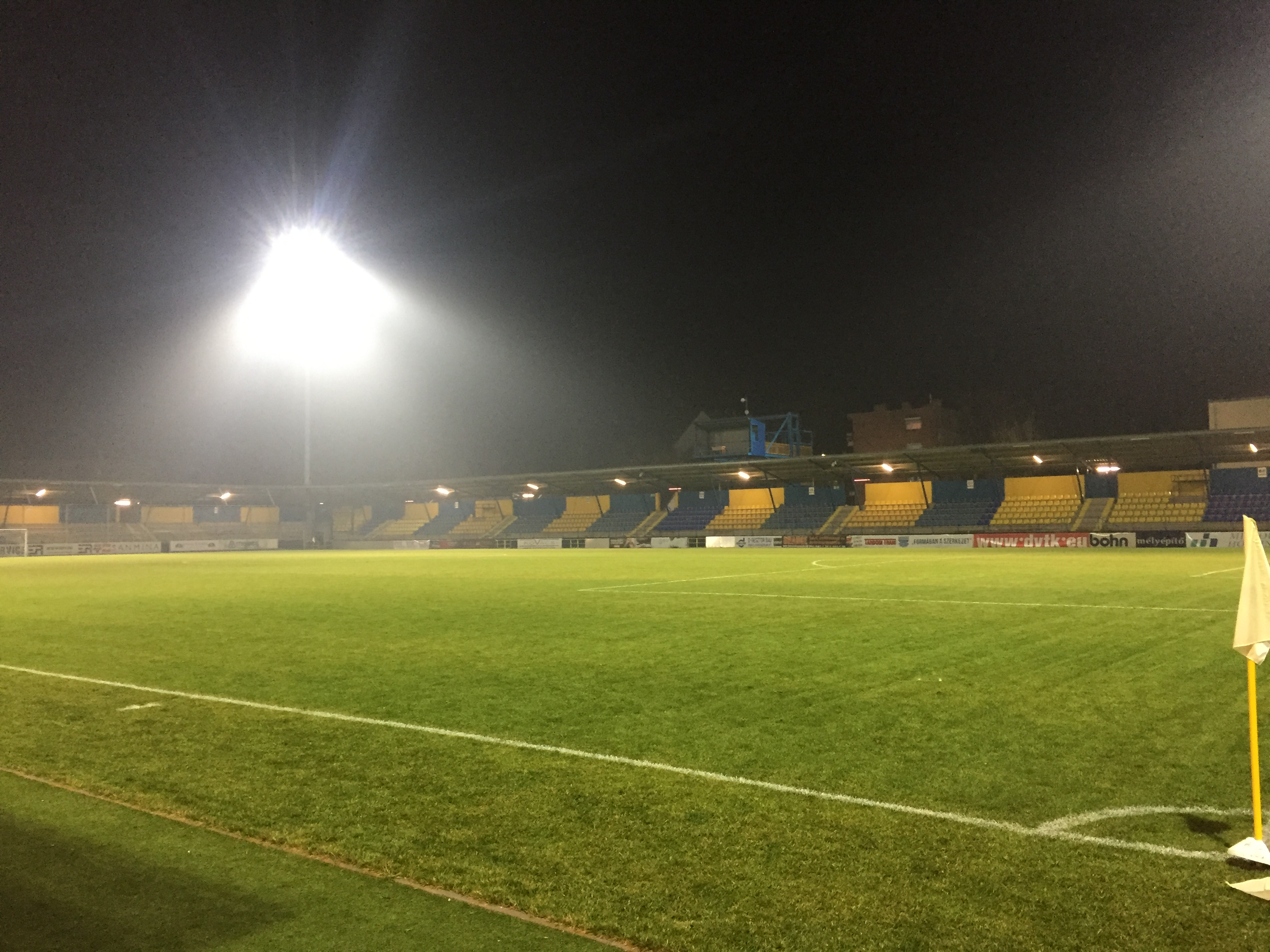
- Interactive map of Mezőkövesdi Városi Stadion
- Location: Mezőkövesd, Hungary
- Coordinates: 47.8023°N 20.5673°E
- Owner: Mezőkövesd Város Önkormányzata
- Capacity: 4,183
- Record attendance: 5,000 (Mezőkövesd v Diósgyőri VTK; 20 April 2014)
- Field size: 105 x 66 meters

Construction
- Opened: 2016
- Renovated: 2013–2016

Tenants
- Mezőkövesdi SE; Diósgyőri VTK (2017); Various Belarusian clubs (2023–present, European competition matches)

Mezőkövesdi Városi Stadion is a sports stadium in Mezőkövesd, Hungary. The stadium is home to association football side Mezőkövesdi SE. The stadium has a capacity of 4,183.

== History ==
The Hungarian government decided to support the reconstruction of the stadium by 400 million HUF. These funds covered expenses of the construction of the main stand.

The renovated stadium opened on 5 June 2016.

On 5 June 2016 the first match was played in the stadium. Mezőkövesdi SE hosted Dunaújváros PASE on the 30th match day in the 2015–16 Nemzeti Bajnokság II season. The match was won by the home team which also resulted the club's promotion to the 2016–17 Nemzeti Bajnokság I.

In the 2016–17 Nemzeti Bajnokság I season Diósgyőri VTK played some of their home matches due to the demolition of their home stadium Diósgyőri Stadion. Nevertheless, when Diósgyőr hosted Mezőkövesd on the 31st match day the match was played at Debrecen's home stadium, Nagyerdei Stadion.

On 20 June 2017, it was announced that Diósgyőr will not play their home matches at the Városi Stadion because the turf cannot endure it. As a consequence, Diósgyőr will play the home matches of the 2017–18 Nemzeti Bajnokság I matches at stadium of Debreceni VSC', Nagyerdei Stadion, in Debrecen.

== Milestone matches ==
5 June 2016	Mezőkövesdi SE (Hungary)	4–0	(Hungary) Dunaújváros PASE	2015-16 Nemzeti Bajnokság II; Opening match
	Vági 1' 56'; Sós 20'; Tóth 27'	Report		Attendance: 4,200; Referee: Béla Botló (Hungary)

17 July 2016	Mezőkövesdi SE (Hungary)	2–2	(Hungary) Gyirmót FC Győr	2016–17 Nemzeti Bajnokság I First Nemzeti Bajnokság I match
	Střeštík 23' 88'	Report	Kiss 66'; Vass 86'	Attendance: 2,548; Referee: István Vad (Hungary)

11 February 2017	Mezőkövesdi SE (Hungary)	0–0	(Hungary) Gyirmót FC Győr	2016–17 Magyar Kupa; First Magyar Kupa match
		Report		Attendance: 980; Referee: J. Erdős (Hungary)

== Average attendances ==
As of 19 May 2019

This table includes only domestic league matches.

Season	Mezőkövesd Zsóry FC								Ref
Season	Division	GP	Average	Change	Highest Gate		Lowest Gate		Ref
2013–14	NB I	15	2,647	–	5,000	vs Diósgyőr	1,500	vs Budapest Honvéd	
2014–15	NB II	15	1,257	−47.5%	2,500	vs Kaposvár	600	vs Sopron	
2015–16	NB II	15	1,530	+21.7%	4,300	vs Dunaújváros	750	vs Siófok	
2016–17	NB I	16	2,098	+37.1%	3,850	vs Diósgyőr	1,215	vs Paks	
2017–18	NB I	16	2,346	+11.8%	3,643	vs Videoton	1,256	vs Budapest Honvéd	
2018–19	NB I	16	2,393	+2.0%	4,032	vs Ferencváros	1,014	vs Kisvárda	

== Gallery ==
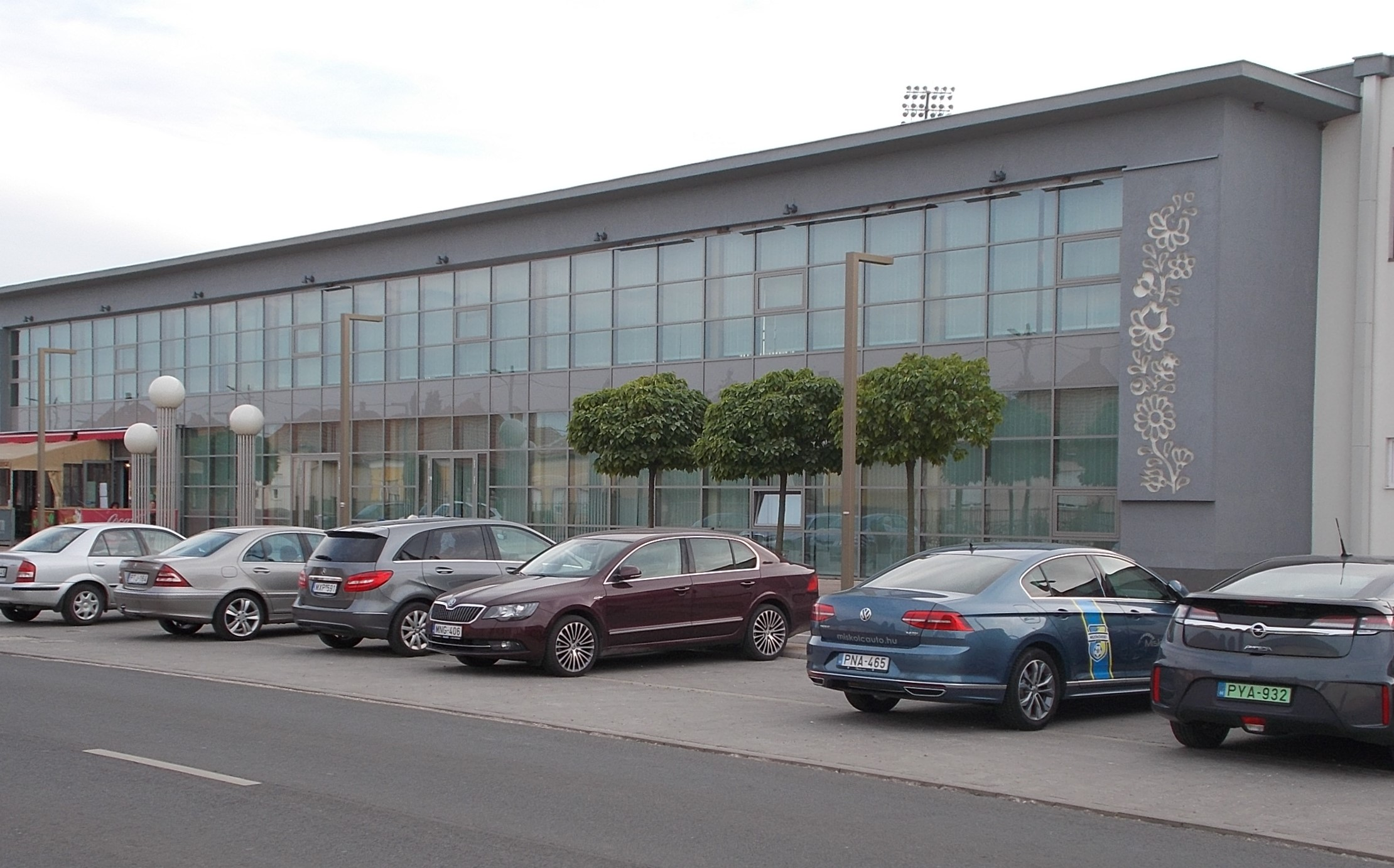
The exterior of the main stand decorated with the Matyó pattern

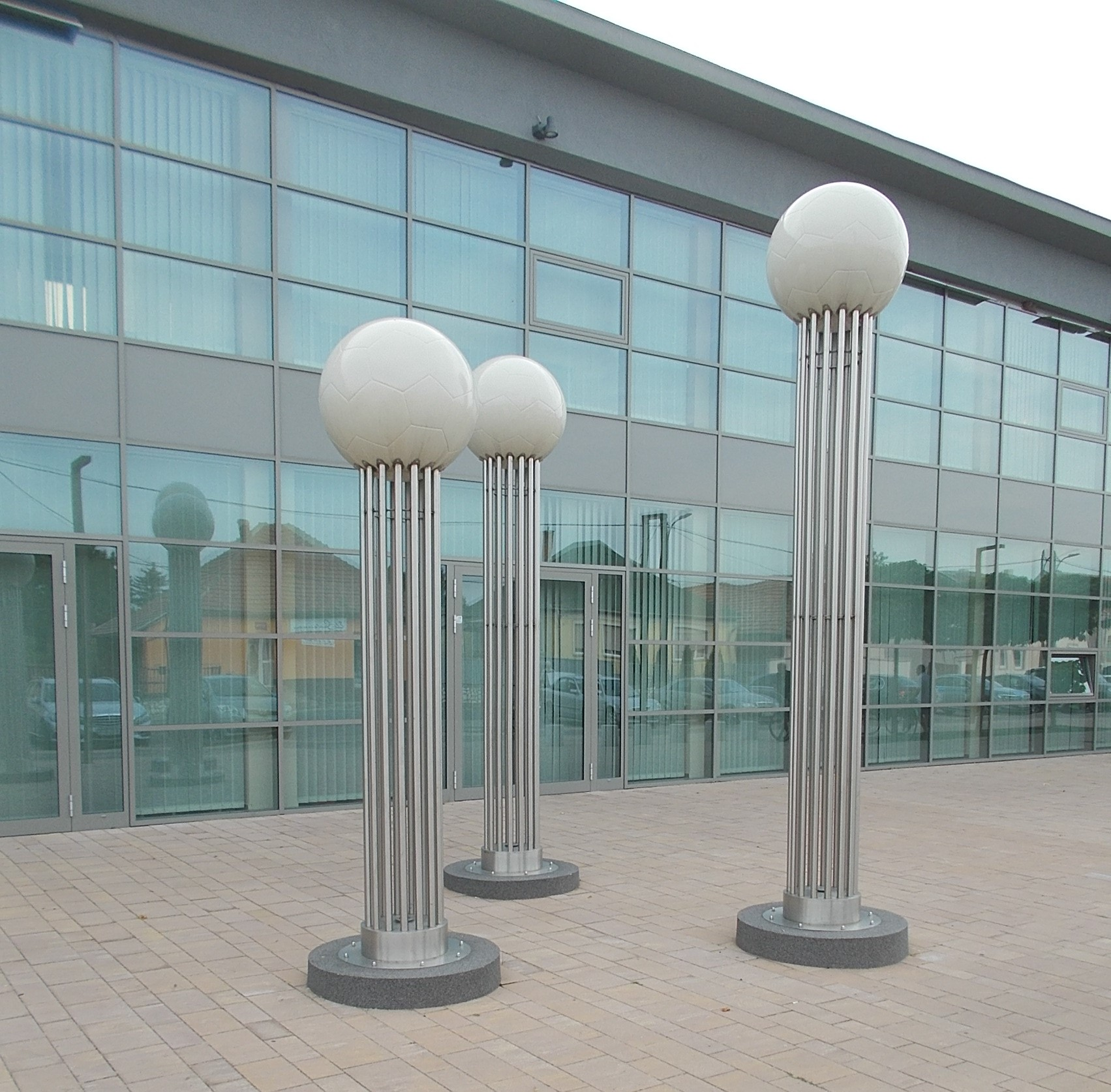
Exterior

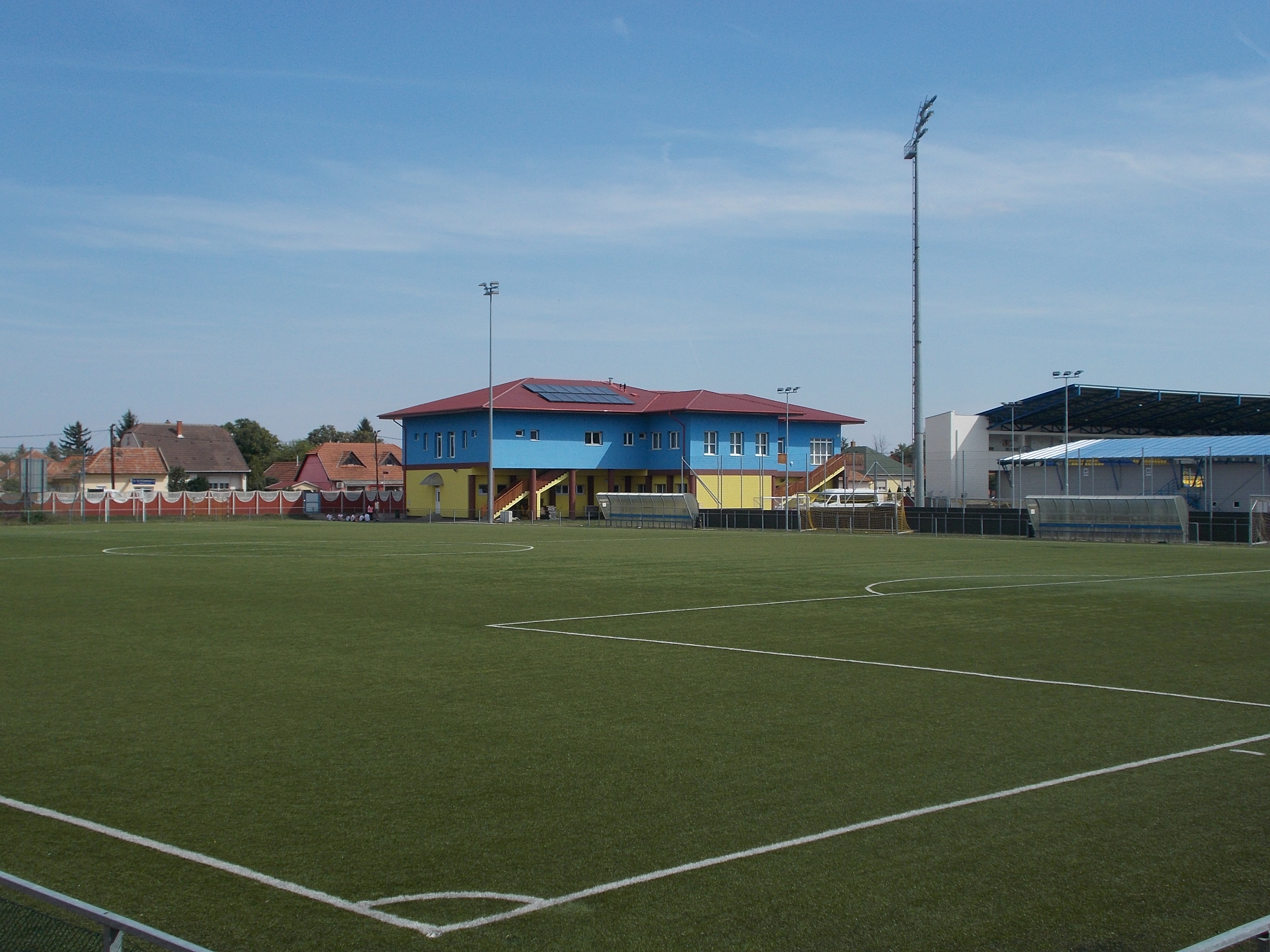

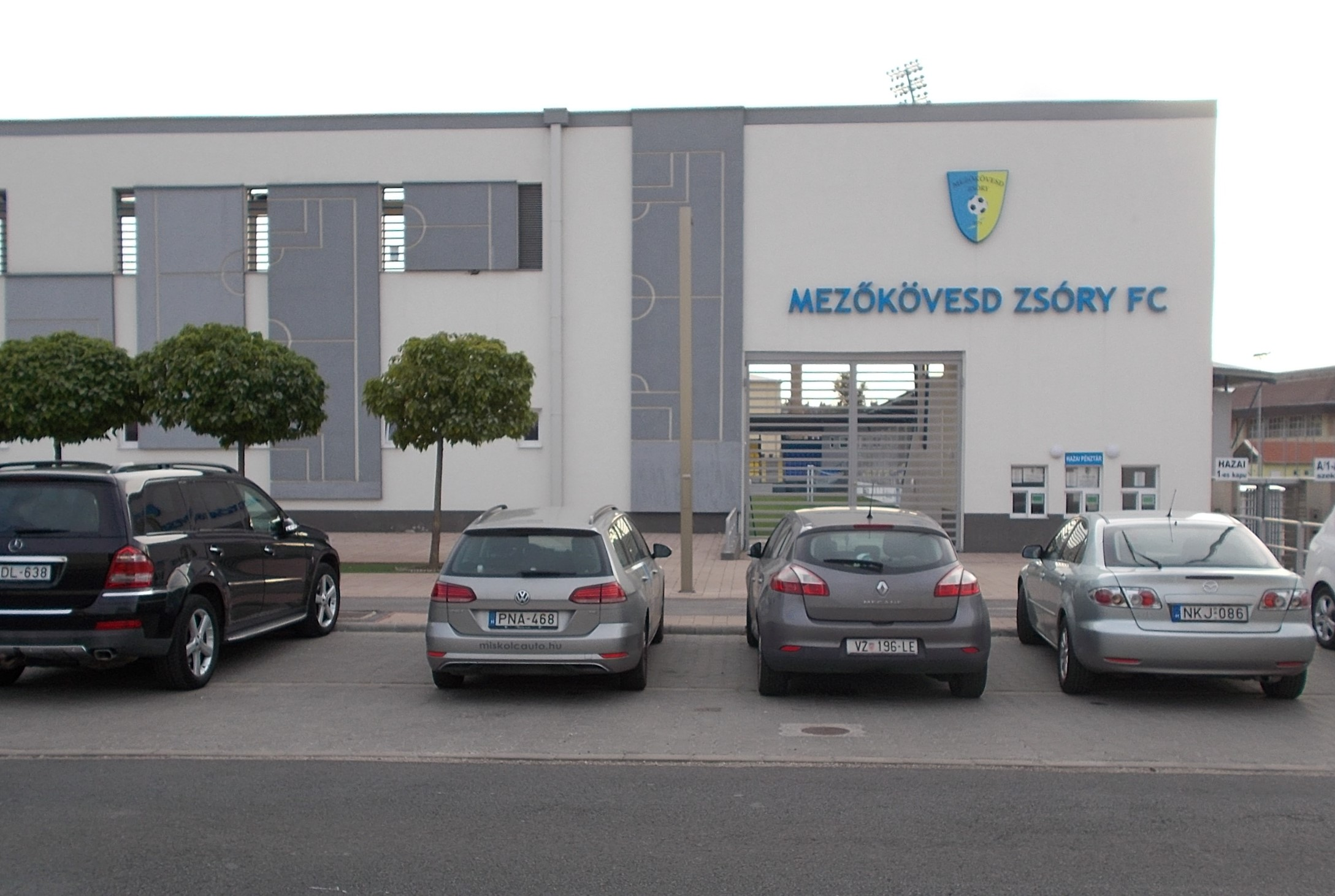
The main entrance
