= Tamás Cseri =

Hungarian footballer

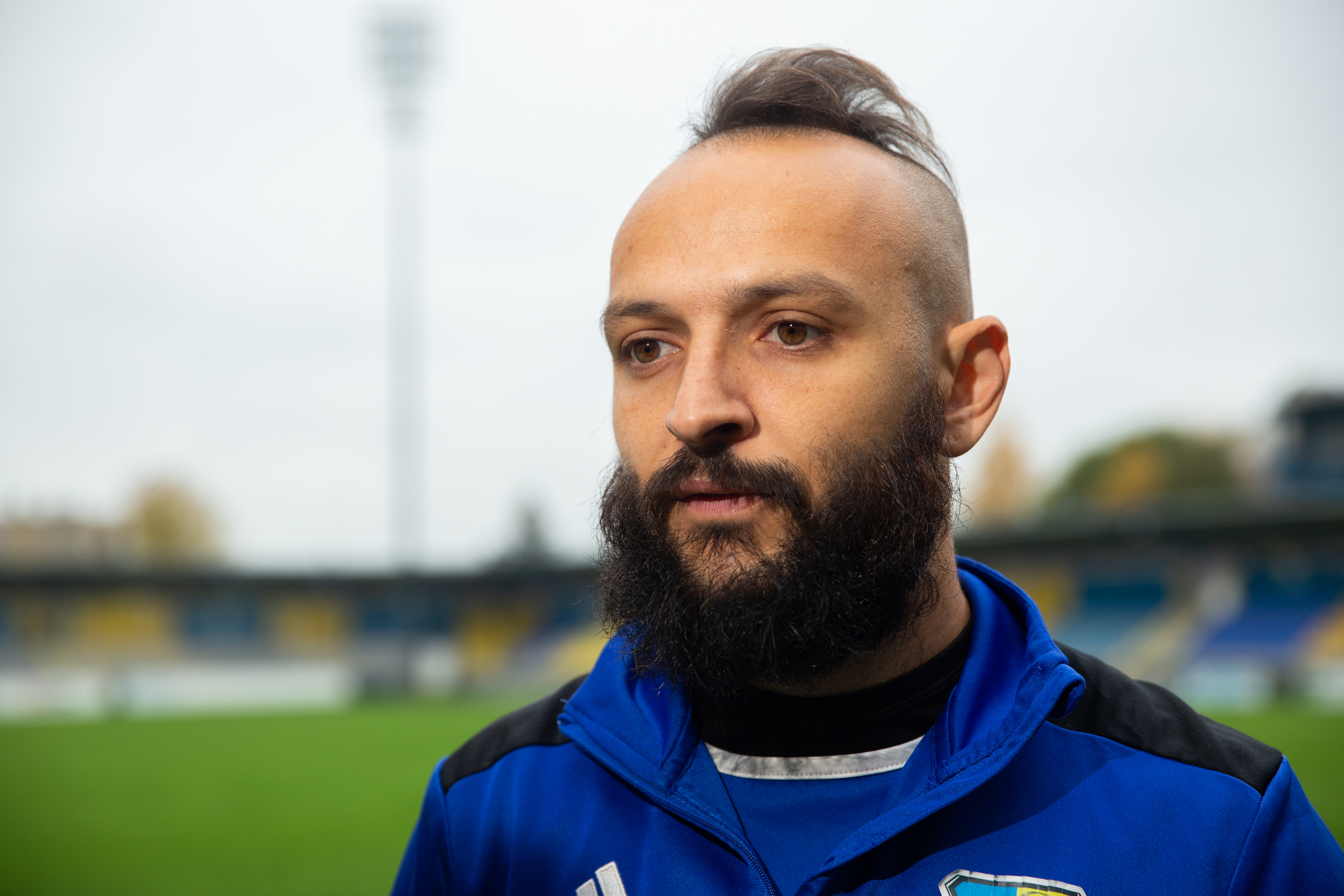

Personal information
- Full name: Tamás Cseri
- Date of birth: 15 January 1988 (age 38)
- Place of birth: Győr, Hungary
- Height: 1.74 m (5 ft 9 in)
- Position: Midfielder

Team information
- Current team: Mezőkövesd
- Number: 24

Youth career
- 2003–2004: Gyirmót
- 2004–2007: Ferencváros

Senior career*
Years	Team	Apps	(Gls)
2007–2008	Mosonmagyaróvár	14	(1)
2008–2009	Győr II	34	(5)
2009–2011	Pécs	18	(1)
2010–2011	→ BKV Előre (loan)	27	(1)
2011–2015	Gyirmót	107	(12)
2015–2017	Kisvárda	66	(5)
2017–	Mezőkövesd	230	(25)

International career^{‡}
2020–2021	Hungary	4	(0)
- * Club domestic league appearances and goals as of 10 June 2025 ‡ National team caps and goals as of 22:16, 22 June 2021 (UTC)

Tamás Cseri (born 15 January 1988) is a Hungarian professional footballer who plays as a midfielder for Mezőkövesdi SE.

== Club career ==
On 15 July 2017, Cseri signed for Nemzeti Bajnokság I club Mezőkövesdi SE.

== International career ==
Cseri made his Hungary national team debut on 6 September 2020 at the age of 32 in a Nations League game against Russia. He substituted Dominik Szoboszlai in the 82nd minute of a 3–2 home loss.

On 1 June 2021, Cseri was included in the final 26-man squad to represent Hungary at the rescheduled UEFA Euro 2020 tournament.

== Career statistics ==
As of matches played as of 10 May 2021

Appearances and goals by club, season and competition
Club	Season	League			Cup		League Cup		Europe		Total	
Club	Season	Division	Apps	Goals	Apps	Goals	Apps	Goals	Apps	Goals	Apps	Goals
Mosonmagyaróvár	2007–08	Nemzeti Bajnokság II	14	1	1	3	—		—		15	4
Győr II	2007–08	Nemzeti Bajnokság III	14	3	0	0	—		—		14	3
Győr II	2008–09	Nemzeti Bajnokság II	20	2	0	0	—		—		20	2
Győr II	Total		34	5	0	0	0	0	0	0	34	5
Pécs	2009–10	Nemzeti Bajnokság II	18	1	3	0	—		—		21	1
BKV Előre	2010–11	Nemzeti Bajnokság II	27	1	3	2	—		—		30	3
Gyirmót	2011–12	Nemzeti Bajnokság II	27	3	3	1	6	0	—		36	4
Gyirmót	2012–13	Nemzeti Bajnokság II	28	2	2	0	5	1	—		35	3
Gyirmót	2013–14	Nemzeti Bajnokság II	24	4	3	0	5	0	—		32	4
Gyirmót	2014–15	Nemzeti Bajnokság II	28	3	2	2	—		—		30	5
Gyirmót	Total		107	12	10	3	16	1	0	0	133	16
Kisvárda	2015–16	Nemzeti Bajnokság II	30	3	1	0	—		—		31	3
Kisvárda	2016–17	Nemzeti Bajnokság II	36	2	1	0	—		—		37	2
Kisvárda	Total		66	5	2	0	0	0	0	0	68	5
Mezőkövesd	2017–18	Nemzeti Bajnokság I	33	4	1	0	—		—		34	4
Mezőkövesd	2018–19	Nemzeti Bajnokság I	29	4	3	0	—		—		32	4
Mezőkövesd	2019–20	Nemzeti Bajnokság I	32	7	6	1	—		—		38	8
Mezőkövesd	2020–21	Nemzeti Bajnokság I	32	6	4	0	—		—		36	6
Mezőkövesd	Total		126	21	14	1	0	0	0	0	140	22
Career total			391	46	33	9	16	1	0	0	441	56

== Honours ==
Mezőkövesd

- Hungarian Cup runner-up: 2019-20
