= Shandor Vayda =

Ukrainian footballer (born 1991)

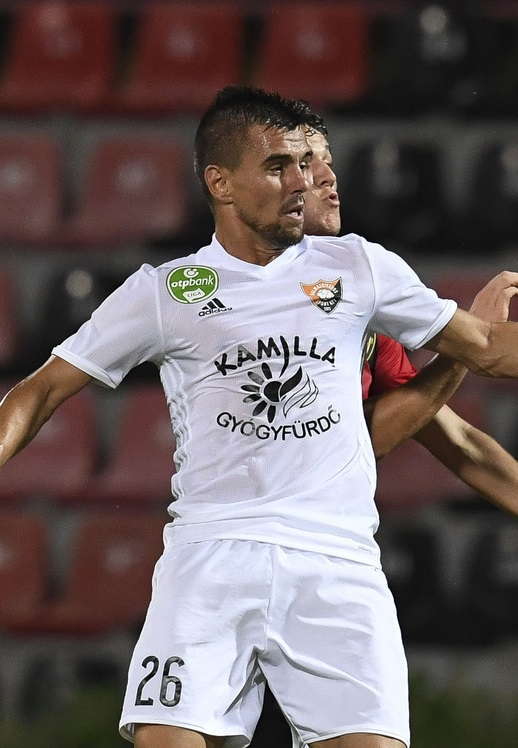
- Vayda playing for Balmazújváros in 2017

Personal information
- Full name: Shandor Oleksandrovych Vayda
- Date of birth: 14 December 1991 (age 34)
- Place of birth: Mátészalka, Hungary
- Height: 1.75 m (5 ft 9 in)
- Position: Midfielder

Team information
- Current team: Mezőkövesd
- Number: 77

Youth career
- 200?–2006: Youth Sportive School Vynohradiv
- 2006–2008: Youth Sportive School Uzhhorod

Senior career*
| Years | Team | Apps | (Gls) |
| 2008–2012 | Hoverla Uzhhorod | 31 | (1) |
| 2009–2010 | → Stal Dniprodzerzhynsk (loan) | 14 | (1) |
| 2010 | → Beregvidek Berehove (loan) | 2 | (0) |
| 2012–2013 | Slavutych Cherkasy | 18 | (4) |
| 2013–2015 | Naftovyk Okhtyrka | 40 | (2) |
| 2015–2018 | Balmazújváros | 87 | (11) |
| 2018– | Mezőkövesd | 192 | (11) |
- * Club domestic league appearances and goals as of 31 May 2026

Shandor Oleksandrovych Vayda (Ukrainian: Шандор Олександрович Вайда; Hungarian: Vajda Sándor; born 14 December 1991) is a Ukrainian professional footballer who plays as a midfielder for Nemzeti Bajnokság II club Mezőkövesd.

Vayda is the product of the different Zakarpattia Oblast sportive schools. His first trainer was Ivan Bilak.
