= Tamás Szeles =

Hungarian footballer (born 1993)

Personal information
- Date of birth: 7 December 1993 (age 32)
- Place of birth: Salgótarján, Hungary
- Height: 1.80 m (5 ft 11 in)
- Position: Defender

Team information
- Current team: Pécs
- Number: 88

Youth career
- 2003–2007: Salgótarján
- 2007–2013: Haladás

Senior career*
Years	Team	Apps	(Gls)
2013–2014	Salgótarján	28	(2)
2014–2021	Mezőkövesd	130	(2)
2021–2022	Diósgyőr	10	(0)
2022–	Pécs	29	(0)
- * Club domestic league appearances and goals as of 21 December 2023

Tamás Szeles (born 7 February 1993) is a Hungarian football player who plays for Pécs.

== Club career ==
On 18 June 2021, Szeles moved to Diósgyőr.

On 1 September 2022, he joined Pécs.

== Career statistics ==
Appearances and goals by club, season and competition
Club	Season	League			Cup		Europe		Total	
Club	Season	Division	Apps	Goals	Apps	Goals	Apps	Goals	Apps	Goals
Salgótarján	2013–14	Megyei Bajnokság I	28	2	5	1	—		33	3
Mezőkövesd	2014–15	Nemzeti Bajnokság II	31	1	2	0	—		33	1
Mezőkövesd	2015–16	Nemzeti Bajnokság II	26	0	2	0	—		28	0
Mezőkövesd	2016–17	Nemzeti Bajnokság I	20	0	5	0	—		25	0
Mezőkövesd	2017–18	Nemzeti Bajnokság I	13	0	2	0	—		15	0
Mezőkövesd	2018–19	Nemzeti Bajnokság I	24	1	1	0	—		25	1
Mezőkövesd	2019–20	Nemzeti Bajnokság I	3	0	0	0	—		3	0
Mezőkövesd	2020–21	Nemzeti Bajnokság I	13	0	2	1	—		15	1
Mezőkövesd	Total		130	2	14	1	0	0	144	3
Career total			138	4	19	2	0	0	177	6

Updated to games played as of 15 May 2021.
