= Daniel Farkaš =

Serbian footballer

Personal information
- Date of birth: 13 January 1993 (age 33)
- Place of birth: Senta, FR Yugoslavia
- Height: 1.80 m (5 ft 11 in)
- Position: Right-back

Youth career
- 2002–2008: Senta

Senior career*
Years	Team	Apps	(Gls)
2008–2011	Senta	51	(0)
2011–2016	Spartak Subotica	108	(2)
2011–2012	→ Senta (loan)	26	(1)
2017–2022	Mezőkövesd	133	(2)
2022–2024	Diósgyőr	24	(1)
2025	Mezőkövesd	2	(0)

International career
2012	Serbia U20	1	(0)
- * Club domestic league appearances and goals as of 15 June 2025

Daniel Farkaš (Serbian Cyrillic: Даниел Фаркаш; born 13 January 1993) is a Serbian football player who most recently played for Hungarian club Mezőkövesd.

== Club career ==
Born in Senta, he is ethnic Hungarian, Farkas has begun his career with FK Senta. In end of season 2011-12 he moved to Spartak Subotica.

On 24 June 2022, Farkas signed with Diósgyőr.

== Career statistics ==
As of 10 May 2021

Club	Season	League			Cup		Continental		Other		Total	
Club	Season	Division	Apps	Goals	Apps	Goals	Apps	Goals	Apps	Goals	Apps	Goals
Senta	2008–09	Serbian League Vojvodina	7	0	—		—		—		7	0
Senta	2009–10	Serbian League Vojvodina	18	0	—		—		—		18	0
Senta	2010–11	Serbian League Vojvodina	26	0	—		—		—		26	0
Senta (loan)	2011–12	Serbian League Vojvodina	26	1	—		—		—		26	1
Senta (loan)	Total		77	1	—		—		—		77	1
Spartak Subotica	2011–12	Serbian SuperLiga	0	0	—		—		—		0	0
Spartak Subotica	2012–13	Serbian SuperLiga	15	0	0	0	—		—		15	0
Spartak Subotica	2013–14	Serbian SuperLiga	23	0	3	0	—		—		26	0
Spartak Subotica	2014–15	Serbian SuperLiga	25	0	3	0	—		—		28	0
Spartak Subotica	2015–16	Serbian SuperLiga	31	2	4	1	—		—		35	3
Spartak Subotica	2016–17	Serbian SuperLiga	14	0	1	0	—		—		15	0
Spartak Subotica	Total		108	2	11	1	—		—		119	3
Mezőkövesd	2016–17	Nemzeti Bajnokság I	7	0	3	0	—		—		10	0
Mezőkövesd	2017–18	Nemzeti Bajnokság I	24	1	2	0	—		—		26	1
Mezőkövesd	2018–19	Nemzeti Bajnokság I	22	0	2	0	—		—		24	0
Mezőkövesd	2019–20	Nemzeti Bajnokság I	25	0	6	0	—		—		31	0
Mezőkövesd	2020–21	Nemzeti Bajnokság I	28	1	3	0	—		—		31	1
Mezőkövesd	Total		106	2	16	0	—		—		121	2
Career total			291	5	27	1	—		—		318	6
