= Filip Dragóner =

Hungarian footballer

Personal information
- Full name: Filip Dávid Dragóner
- Date of birth: 12 March 1998 (age 28)
- Place of birth: Budapest, Hungary
- Height: 1.80 m (5 ft 11 in)
- Position: Centre forward

Team information
- Current team: Soroksár
- Number: 76

Youth career
- 2006–2016: Ferencváros

Senior career*
Years	Team	Apps	(Gls)
2016–2017	Ferencváros	0	(0)
2016–2017	→ Nyíregyháza (loan)	25	(5)
2017–2019	Nyíregyháza	39	(10)
2019–2020	Mezőkövesd	6	(2)
2019–2020	→ Szeged (loan)	4	(1)
2020–2021	Zalaegerszeg	7	(0)
2021	Haladás	17	(3)
2021–2023	Ajka	50	(7)
2023–	Soroksár	47	(3)

International career
2016	Hungary U-18	2	(1)
2016−2017	Hungary U-19	4	(0)
- * Club domestic league appearances and goals as of 10 June 2025

Filip Dragóner (born 12 March 1998) is a Hungarian professional footballer who plays for Soroksár.

== Club career ==
On 13 August 2021, Dragóner signed a two-year contract with Ajka.

== Career statistics ==
As of 27 June 2020

Appearances and goals by club, season and competition
Club	Season	League			Cup		Europe		Total	
Club	Season	Division	Apps	Goals	Apps	Goals	Apps	Goals	Apps	Goals
Nyíregyháza
Nyíregyháza	2016–17	Nemzeti Bajnokság II	25	5	1	0	—		26	5
Nyíregyháza	2017–18	Nemzeti Bajnokság II	24	8	1	0	—		25	8
Nyíregyháza	2018–19	Nemzeti Bajnokság II	15	2	1	0	—		16	2
Nyíregyháza	Total		64	15	3	0	0	0	67	15
Mezőkövesd
Mezőkövesd	2018–19	Nemzeti Bajnokság I	2	1	3	0	—		5	1
Mezőkövesd	2019–20	Nemzeti Bajnokság I	4	1	0	0	—		4	1
Mezőkövesd	Total		6	2	3	0	0	0	9	2
Szeged	2019–20	Nemzeti Bajnokság II	4	1	1	0	—		5	1
Career total			74	18	7	0	0	0	81	17
