= László Varjas =

Hungarian association football player

Personal information
- Full name: László Varjas
- Date of birth: 17 May 2000 (age 26)
- Place of birth: Székesfehérvár, Hungary
- Height: 1.81 m (5 ft 11 in)
- Position: Left winger

Team information
- Current team: Tiszaújváros
- Number: 20

Youth career
- 2010–2017: Videoton
- 2017–2018: Mezőkövesd

Senior career*
Years	Team	Apps	(Gls)
2018–2021	Mezőkövesd	1	(0)
2019	→ Vác (loan)	3	(0)
2020	→ Kaposvár (loan)	0	(0)
2021–2022	Hidasnémet	27	(5)
2022–2022	Jászberény	13	(2)
2023–	Tiszaújváros	13	(4)
- * Club domestic league appearances and goals as of 21:23, 8 July 2023 (UTC)

László Varjas (born 17 May 2000 in Székesfehérvár) is a Hungarian football player who currently plays for FC Tiszaújváros.

== Career ==
=== Mezőkövesd ===
On 15 December 2018, Varjas played his first match for Mzeőkövesd in a 0–2 loss against Puskás Akadémia FC in the Hungarian League. On 14 February 2019, Varjas was loaned out to Vác FC for the rest of the season.

== Career statistics ==
Appearances and goals by club, season and competition
Club	Season	League			Cup		Other		Total	
Club	Season	Division	Apps	Goals	Apps	Goals	Apps	Goals	Apps	Goals
Mezőkövesd	2018–19	Nemzeti Bajnokság I	1	0	2	0	—		3	0
Mezőkövesd	2019–20	Nemzeti Bajnokság I	0	0	1	0	—		1	0
Career total			1	0	3	0	0	0	4	0

Updated to games played as of 2 November 2019.
