= Erik Silye =

Hungarian footballer (born 1996)

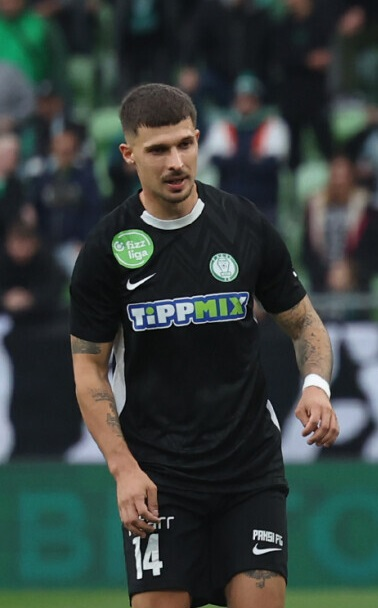
- Silye playing for Paks in 2025

Personal information
- Date of birth: 12 June 1996 (age 30)
- Place of birth: Gyomaendrőd, Hungary
- Height: 1.83 m (6 ft 0 in)
- Position: Left-back

Team information
- Current team: Paks
- Number: 14

Youth career
- 2005–2008: Orosháza
- 2007–2013: Békéscsaba
- 2013–2016: Ferencváros

Senior career*
Years	Team	Apps	(Gls)
2015–2020	Ferencváros	0	(0)
2015–2016	→ Ferencváros II	26	(2)
2016–2018	→ Soroksár (loan)	57	(4)
2018–2020	→ Mezőkövesd (loan)	41	(2)
2020–2023	Vasas	97	(9)
2023–	Paks	69	(4)
- * Club domestic league appearances and goals as of 30 May 2026

Erik Silye (born 12 June 1996) is a Hungarian professional footballer who plays as a left-back for Nemzeti Bajnokság I club Paks.

== Career ==
=== Paks ===
On 15 May 2024, he won the 2024 Magyar Kupa Final with Paks by beating Ferencváros 2–0 at the Puskás Aréna.

== Career statistics ==
Appearances and goals by club, season and competition
Club	Season	League			Cup		League Cup		Europe		Total	
Club	Season	Division	Apps	Goals	Apps	Goals	Apps	Goals	Apps	Goals	Apps	Goals
Ferencváros
Ferencváros	2014–15	Nemzeti Bajnokság I	0	0	0	0	2	0	0	0	2	0
Ferencváros	2015–16	Nemzeti Bajnokság I	0	0	1	0	—		0	0	1	0
Ferencváros	Total		0	0	1	0	2	0	0	0	3	0
Ferencváros II	2015–16	Nemzeti Bajnokság III	26	2	0	0	—		—		26	2
Soroksár
Soroksár	2016–17	Nemzeti Bajnokság II	34	1	0	0	—		—		34	1
Soroksár	2017–18	Nemzeti Bajnokság II	23	3	1	0	—		—		24	3
Soroksár	Total		57	4	1	0	0	0	0	0	58	4
Mezőkövesd
Mezőkövesd	2018–19	Nemzeti Bajnokság I	20	0	4	1	—		—		24	1
Mezőkövesd	2019–20	Nemzeti Bajnokság I	21	2	5	0	—		—		26	2
Mezőkövesd	Total		41	2	9	1	0	0	0	0	50	3
Career total			124	8	11	1	2	0	0	0	137	9

Updated to games played as of 27 June 2020.
