= Mykhaylo Meskhi =

Ukrainian footballer (born 1997)

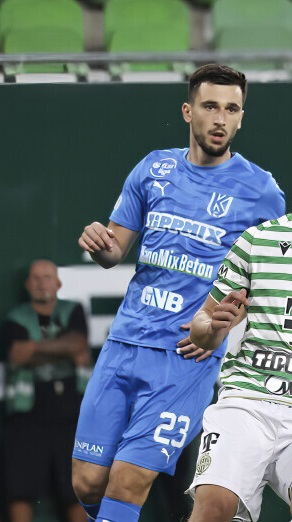
- Meskhi playing for Kazincbarcika in 2025

Personal information
- Full name: Mykhaylo Mamukovych Meskhi
- Date of birth: 26 February 1997 (age 29)
- Place of birth: Donetsk, Ukraine
- Height: 1.87 m (6 ft 2 in)
- Position: Midfielder

Team information
- Current team: Kazincbarcika
- Number: 23

Youth career
- 2010–2014: Metalurh Donetsk

Senior career*
Years	Team	Apps	(Gls)
2014–2015	Metalurh Donetsk	0	(0)
2015–2018	Stal Kamianske	29	(1)
2018–2021	Mezőkövesd	45	(1)
2018–2021	Mezőkövesd II	12	(2)
2021–2022	Mynai	13	(0)
2022–2025	Kecskemét	57	(0)
2022–2025	Kecskemét II	15	(3)
2025–	Kazincbarcika	30	(2)
- * Club domestic league appearances and goals as of 30 May 2026

Mykhaylo Mamukovych Meskhi (Ukrainian: Михайло Мамукович Месхі; born 26 February 1997) is a Ukrainian professional footballer who plays as a midfielder for Nemzeti Bajnokság I club Kazincbarcika.

== Career ==
Meskhi is a product of the youth team system of present-day defunct FC Metalurh from his native city Donetsk.

From 2015 he plays for FC Stal Kamianske and made his debut for FC Stal in the game against FC Shakhtar Donetsk on 4 December 2016 in the Ukrainian Premier League.

On 13 July 2018 he signed a contract to Hungarian first division team Mezőkövesdi SE.
