= Róbert Pillár =

Slovak footballer

Personal information
- Full name: Róbert Pillár
- Date of birth: 27 May 1991 (age 35)
- Place of birth: Bardejov, Czechoslovakia
- Height: 1.89 m (6 ft 2 in)
- Position: Centre back

Team information
- Current team: KFC Komárno
- Number: 21

Youth career
- Partizán Bardejov
- 2009–2010: Senica

Senior career*
Years	Team	Apps	(Gls)
2010–2017	Senica	139	(18)
2013	→ Hradec Králové (loan)	8	(1)
2014	→ Nitra (loan)	9	(3)
2017–2024	Mezőkövesd	143	(8)
2024-	KFC Komárno	61	(0)

International career
2010–2013	Slovakia U21	7	(0)
- * Club domestic league appearances and goals as of 22 September 2026

Róbert Pillár (born 27 May 1991) is a Slovak football defender who currently plays for KFC Komárno. He was also member of the Slovakia national under-21 football team.

== Club career ==
Pillár was born in Bardejov. Róbert spent his early youth developing at hometown club Partizán Bardejov. In 2010, Pillár moved to FK Senica. He made his debut in the first league game of the 2009–10 season, against MFK Petržalka and has been a regular in defence.

== Club statistics ==
Club	Season	League		Cup		Europe		Total	
Club	Season	Apps	Goals	Apps	Goals	Apps	Goals	Apps	Goals
Senica
Senica	2009–10	1	1	0	0	–	–	1	1
Senica	2010–11	31	4	0	0	–	–	31	4
Senica	2011–12	13	0	0	0	1	0	14	0
Senica	2012–13	3	1	0	0	–	–	3	1
Senica	2014–15	32	8	7	0	–	–	39	8
Senica	2015–16	28	2	3	0	–	–	31	2
Senica	2016–17	31	2	1	0	–	–	32	2
Senica	Total	139	18	11	0	1	0	151	18
Hradec Králové
Hradec Králové	2013–14	8	1	1	0	–	–	9	1
Hradec Králové	Total	8	1	1	0	–	–	9	1
Nitra
Nitra	2013–14	9	3	0	0	–	–	9	3
Nitra	Total	9	3	0	0	0	0	9	3
Mezőkövesd
Mezőkövesd	2017–18	13	2	0	0	–	–	13	2
Mezőkövesd	2018–19	32	1	0	0	–	–	32	1
Mezőkövesd	2019–20	23	1	7	3	–	–	30	4
Mezőkövesd	2020–21	12	1	3	1	–	–	15	2
Mezőkövesd	Total	80	5	10	4	0	0	90	9
Career Total		236	26	22	4	1	0	259	30

Updated to games played as of 10 May 2021.
