= Matija Katanec =

Croatian footballer (born 1990)

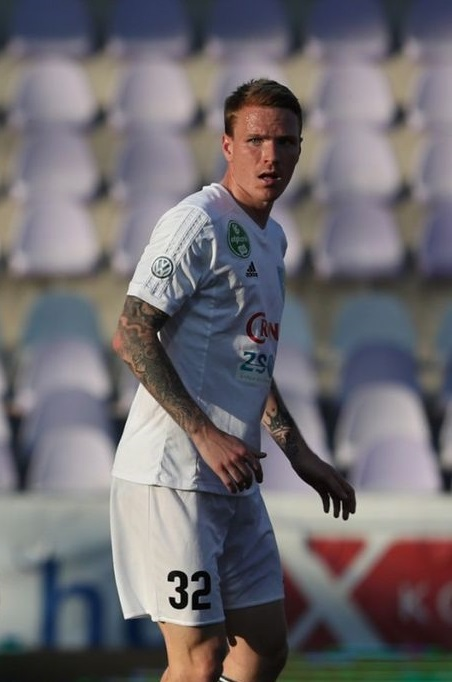
- Katanec playing for Mezőkövesd in 2018

Personal information
- Date of birth: 4 May 1990 (age 36)
- Place of birth: Varaždin, SR Croatia, SFR Yugoslavia
- Height: 1.87 m (6 ft 2 in)
- Position: Centre-back

Youth career
- –2007: Varteks

Senior career*
| Years | Team | Apps | (Gls) |
| 2007–2008 | Varteks | | |
| 2008–2009 | Croatia Sesvete | 14 | (0) |
| 2010 | ND Gorica | 0 | (0) |
| 2010 | → Varaždin (loan) | 2 | (0) |
| 2011 | ASK Baumgarten | 15 | (2) |
| 2011 | Podravina | | |
| 2012 | Varaždin | 2 | (0) |
| 2012–2013 | Gradina | 13 | (1) |
| 2013–2014 | Radnik Bijeljina | 42 | (5) |
| 2014–2015 | Zrinjski Mostar | 14 | (0) |
| 2015 | Spezia | 0 | (0) |
| 2015–2016 | HNK Gorica | 4 | (0) |
| 2016–2018 | Zrinjski Mostar | 51 | (3) |
| 2018–2022 | Mezőkövesd | 85 | (1) |
| 2020 | → Zalaegerszeg (loan) | 9 | (0) |
| 2020 | Mezőkövesd II | 2 | (0) |
| 2022–2023 | Varaždin | 2 | (0) |
| 2023–2024 | Politehnica Iași | 29 | (1) |

International career
| 2005–2006 | Croatia U16 | 2 | (0) |
| 2006 | Croatia U17 | 1 | (0) |
| 2008 | Croatia U19 | 2 | (0) |
| 2010 | Croatia U20 | 1 | (0) |
- * Club domestic league appearances and goals as of 12 May 2024

Matija Katanec (born 4 May 1990) is a Croatian professional footballer who plays as a central defender.

== Career ==
Born in Varaždin, Katanec kicked off his career with local club Varteks and was promoted to the senior side in 2007. In July 2008, he was released by the club. After having represented Sesvete in the Croatian top tier, he moved abroad, signing for Slovenian club Gorica. On 1 November 2010, he returned to Varteks, renamed NK Varaždin a few months earlier, on loan.

On 3 February 2011, Katanec joined Austrian non league club Baumgarten. On 1 March 2013, he moved to Bosnian club Radnik after a stint with Gradina of the same country. After a single season with the club, he joined Zrinjski. He featured for the club in the UEFA Champions League qualifying round match against Slovenian club Maribor.

After having made 69 appearances for the Bosnian clubs, Katanec switched clubs and countries, signing for Italian Serie B club Spezia on 20 January 2015. However, he failed to make any appearance for the Italian side and hence subsequently joined Croatian second-tier club Gorica in September till the end of the season.

On 29 December 2015, Katanec returned to Bosnian club Zrinjski, penning a deal which would keep him in the club till 1 July 2018. On 17 January 2018, he moved to Hungarian club Mezőkövesdi SE.

== Honours ==
Podravina

- Treća HNL – East: 2010–11

Radnik Bijeljina

- Republika Srpska Cup: 2012–13, 2013–14

Zrinjski Mostar

- Premier League of Bosnia and Herzegovina: 2015–16, 2016–17

Politehnica Iași

- Liga II: 2022–23
