= Gábor Eperjesi =

Hungarian footballer

Personal information
- Date of birth: 12 January 1994 (age 32)
- Place of birth: Miskolc, Hungary
- Height: 1.78 m (5 ft 10 in)
- Position: Defender

Team information
- Current team: Emődi ÁIDSE

Youth career
- 2003–2010: Diósgyőr

Senior career*
| Years | Team | Apps | (Gls) |
| 2010–2019 | Diósgyőr | 75 | (0) |
| 2019–2021 | Mezőkövesd | 33 | (0) |
| 2021–2022 | Diósgyőr | 27 | (1) |
| 2023–2024 | FK Csíkszereda | 6 | (0) |
| 2024 | Dunaújváros | 6 | (0) |
| 2024– | Emődi ÁIDSE | 13 | (8) |

International career^{‡}
| 2010–2011 | Hungary U17 | | |
| 2011–2012 | Hungary U18 | | |
| 2015 | Hungary U21 | 1 | (0) |
- * Club domestic league appearances and goals as of 23 November 2024 ‡ National team caps and goals as of 26 March 2015

Gábor Eperjesi (born 12 January 1994) is a Hungarian professional footballer who plays for Hungarian Megyei Bajnokság I club Emődi ÁIDSE.

== Career ==
In January 2023, Eperjesi joined Csíkszereda in Romania.

== Career statistics ==
Appearances and goals by club, season and competition
| Club | Season | League | | | Cup | | League Cup | | Europe | | Total | |
| Club | Season | Division | Apps | Goals | Apps | Goals | Apps | Goals | Apps | Goals | Apps | Goals |
|---|---|---|---|---|---|---|---|---|---|---|---|---|
| Diósgyőr | 2010–11 | Nemzeti Bajnokság II | 2 | 0 | 0 | 0 | 0 | 0 | 0 | 0 | 2 | 0 |
| Diósgyőr | 2011–12 | Nemzeti Bajnokság I | 0 | 0 | 0 | 0 | 1 | 0 | 0 | 0 | 1 | 0 |
| Diósgyőr | 2012–13 | Nemzeti Bajnokság I | 0 | 0 | 1 | 0 | 3 | 0 | 0 | 0 | 4 | 0 |
| Diósgyőr | 2013–14 | Nemzeti Bajnokság I | 12 | 0 | 4 | 0 | 7 | 0 | 0 | 0 | 23 | 0 |
| Diósgyőr | 2014–15 | Nemzeti Bajnokság I | 7 | 0 | 1 | 0 | 3 | 0 | 1 | 0 | 12 | 0 |
| Diósgyőr | 2015–16 | Nemzeti Bajnokság I | 11 | 0 | 1 | 0 | — | | — | | 12 | 0 |
| Diósgyőr | 2016–17 | Nemzeti Bajnokság I | 21 | 0 | 5 | 0 | — | | — | | 26 | 0 |
| Diósgyőr | 2017–18 | Nemzeti Bajnokság I | 17 | 0 | 4 | 0 | — | | — | | 21 | 0 |
| Diósgyőr | 2018–19 | Nemzeti Bajnokság I | 5 | 0 | 1 | 0 | — | | — | | 6 | 0 |
| Diósgyőr | Total | | 75 | 0 | 17 | 0 | 14 | 0 | 1 | 0 | 107 | 0 |
| Mezőkövesd | 2018–19 | Nemzeti Bajnokság I | 7 | 0 | 4 | 0 | — | | — | | 11 | 0 |
| Mezőkövesd | 2019–20 | Nemzeti Bajnokság I | 15 | 0 | 6 | 1 | — | | — | | 21 | 1 |
| Mezőkövesd | 2020–21 | Nemzeti Bajnokság I | 11 | 0 | 1 | 0 | — | | — | | 12 | 0 |
| Mezőkövesd | Total | | 33 | 0 | 11 | 1 | 0 | 0 | 0 | 0 | 44 | 1 |
| Career total | | | 108 | 0 | 28 | 1 | 14 | 0 | 1 | 0 | 151 | 1 |

Updated to games played as of 10 May 2021.

== Honours ==
Diósgyőr

- Hungarian League Cup: 2013–14

Mezőkövesd

- Hungarian Cup Runners-up: 2019–20
