= 2021–22 Zalaegerszegi TE season =

Zalaegerszegi TE
2021–22 season
- Chairman: Gábor Végh
- Manager: Gábor Boér
- Stadium: ZTE Arena
- NB I: 8th
- Magyar Kupa: Round of 32
Home colours	Away colours

The 2021–22 season was Zalaegerszegi TE's 41st consecutive season in the Nemzeti Bajnokság I and 101st year in existence as a football club.

== Squad ==
As of 25 August 2021

Note: Flags indicate national team as defined under FIFA eligibility rules; some limited exceptions apply. Players may hold more than one non-FIFA nationality.

No.	Pos.	Nation	Player
1	GK	HUN	Patrik Demjén
3	DF	HUN	Dávid Kálnoki-Kis
4	DF	CRO	Zoran Lesjak
5	DF	HUN	Dávid Bobál
6	MF	MLI	Bakary Nimaga
7	MF	HUN	Alen Skribek (on loan from Puskás Akadémia)
8	MF	HUN	Mátyás Tajti
9	FW	HUN	Márk Koszta
10	FW	HUN	Benjamin Babati (captain)
11	FW	HUN	Péter Beke
13	DF	HUN	Martin Majnovics
14	FW	ALB	Eros Grezda (on loan from Osijek)
16	FW	HUN	Dávid Zimonyi
17	DF	HUN	András Huszti (on loan from Puskás Akadémia)

No.	Pos.	Nation	Player
18	MF	MNE	Bojan Sanković
21	MF	BIH	Emir Halilovic
23	MF	MKD	Daniel Milovanovikj
24	FW	HUN	László Papp
27	MF	HUN	Bence Bedi
31	DF	MKD	Nikola Serafimov
44	DF	HUN	Bence Gergényi
46	GK	HUN	Bence Köcse
50	FW	CRO	Josip Spoljaric (on loan from Osijek)
70	FW	NGR	Meshack Ubochioma
95	GK	HUN	Márton Gyurján
97	FW	HUN	Dániel Németh
99	FW	BUL	Preslav Borukov

== Transfers ==
=== Summer ===
In: Note: Flags indicate national team as defined under FIFA eligibility rules; some limited exceptions apply. Players may hold more than one non-FIFA nationality.

No.	Pos.	Nation	Player
6	MF	MLI	Bakary Nimaga (from (Austria) Hartberg)
7	MF	HUN	Alen Skribek (loan from Puskás Akadémia)
11	FW	HUN	Péter Beke (from (Germany) Hamburg II)
13	DF	HUN	Martin Majnovics (from (Austria) St. Pölten)
14	FW	ALB	Eros Grezda (loan from (Croatia) Osijek)
17	DF	HUN	András Huszti (loan from Puskás Akadémia)
21	MF	BIH	Emir Halilović (from (Turkey) Bandırmaspor)
23	MF	MKD	Daniel Milovanovikj (from (North Macedonia) Akademija Pandev)
31	DF	MKD	Nikola Serafimov (from (North Macedonia) Akademija Pandev)
50	FW	CRO	Josip Špoljarić (loan from (Croatia) Osijek)
70	FW	NGR	Meshack Ubochioma (loan return from (Slovenia) Nafta)
99	FW	BUL	Preslav Borukov (from (Bulgaria) Etar Tarnovo)

Out: Note: Flags indicate national team as defined under FIFA eligibility rules; some limited exceptions apply. Players may hold more than one non-FIFA nationality.

No.	Pos.	Nation	Player
6	DF	HUN	Dániel Szalai (to Budafok)
7	MF	HUN	Patrik Vass (to Nyíregyháza)
11	FW	HUN	Regő Szánthó (loan return to Ferencváros)
17	MF	POR	Sandro Semedo
19	DF	SVK	János Szépe (to Mezőkövesd)
20	MF	HUN	Barnabás Kovács (loan to Tiszakécske)
21	MF	HUN	Bertalan Kun (to (Serbia) Proleter Novi Sad)
22	DF	SRB	Aleksandar Tanasin (to (Serbia) Proleter Novi Sad)
23	FW	HUN	Márkó Futács
25	MF	UKR	Artem Favorov (loan return to Puskás Akadémia)
28	DF	HUN	Erik Németh (loan to (Slovenia) Nafta)
42	FW	HUN	Norbert Könyves (to Diósgyőr)
77	FW	HUN	Szabolcs Szalay (loan to Tiszakécske)
—	MF	HUN	Dániel Szökrönyös (to (Slovenia) Nafta)
—	DF	NGR	Orji Chukwuma

=== Winter ===
In: Note: Flags indicate national team as defined under FIFA eligibility rules; some limited exceptions apply. Players may hold more than one non-FIFA nationality.

No.	Pos.	Nation	Player
—	MF	HUN	Ádám Halmai (loan from Fehérvár)
—	DF	HUN	Attila Mocsi (from Szombathelyi Haladás)
—	FW	HUN	Dániel Zsóri (loan from Fehérvár)
—	MF	HUN	Ádám Halmai (loan from Fehérvár)
—	MF	CRO	Šime Gržan (loan from (Croatia) Osijek)
—	MF	HUN	Patrik Posztobányi (loan from Puskás Akadémia)
—	DF	SLO	Mihael Rebernik (loan from (Slovenia) Nafta)

Out: Note: Flags indicate national team as defined under FIFA eligibility rules; some limited exceptions apply. Players may hold more than one non-FIFA nationality.

No.	Pos.	Nation	Player
6	MF	MLI	Bakary Nimaga (to (Austria) Rheindorf Altach)
7	MF	HUN	Alen Skribek (loan return to Puskás Akadémia)
10	MF	HUN	Benjamin Babati (to Mezőkövesd)
11	FW	HUN	Péter Beke (to Budafok)
99	FW	BUL	Preslav Borukov

== Competitions ==
=== Overview ===
Competition	First match	Last match	Starting round	Final position	Record							
Competition	First match	Last match	Starting round	Final position	Pld	W	D	L	GF	GA	GD	Win %
Nemzeti Bajnokság I	31 July 2021	25 May 2022	Matchday 1	TBA	18	6	5	7	27	35	−8	33.33
Hungarian Cup	18 September 2021	27 October 2021	Round of 64	Round of 32	2	1	0	1	4	1	+3	50.00
Total					20	7	5	8	31	36	−5	35.00

Last updated: 30 January 2022
Source: Competitions

=== Nemzeti Bajnokság I ===
==== League table ====
Pos	Team	Pld	W	D	L	GF	GA	GD	Pts
6	Paks	33	12	7	14	75	63	+12	43
7	Debrecen	33	10	9	14	45	52	−7	39
8	Zalaegerszeg	33	10	9	14	44	58	−14	39
9	Honvéd	33	10	8	15	48	51	−3	38
10	Mezőkövesd	33	10	8	15	37	49	−12	38

Source: Hungarian Football Federation (in Hungarian), Soccerway
Rules for classification: 1) Points; 2) Matches won; 3) Goal difference; 4) Goals scored; 5) Head-to-head points; 6) Head-to-head goal difference; 7) Head-to-head away goals scored; 8) Fair play ranking; 9) Drawing of lots.

==== Results summary ====
Overall								Home						Away					
Pld	W	D	L	GF	GA	GD	Pts	W	D	L	GF	GA	GD	W	D	L	GF	GA	GD
18	6	5	7	27	36	−9	23	4	2	3	14	15	−1	2	3	4	13	21	−8

Last updated: 30 January 2022.
Source: Soccerway

==== Results by round ====
Round	1	2	3	4	5	6	7	8	9	10	11	12	13	14	15	16	17	18	19	20	21	22	23	24	25	26	27	28	29	30	31	32	33
Ground	H	A	H	A	H	A	H	H	A	H	A	A	H	A	H	A	H	A															
Result	D	L	L	W	L	D	L	W	W	W	L	L	D	D	W	D	W	L															
Position	8	9	11	9	10	10	10	9	7	5	7	7	8	8	7	7	5	7															

Updated to match(es) played on 30 January 2022. Source: Matches
A = Away; H = Home; W = Win; D = Draw; L = Loss

==== Matches ====
1 August 2021 1	Zalaegerszeg	1–1	Fehérvár	Zalaegerszeg
17:45 CEST	Babati 68'	Report	Dárdai 47'	Stadium: ZTE Arena; Attendance: 1,965; Referee: Sándor Andó-Szabó

7 August 2021 2	Mezőkövesd	3–2	Zalaegerszeg	Mezőkövesd
17:45 CEST	Jurina 15'; Cseri 54' (pen.); Beširović 83'	Report	Koszta 67'; Serafimov 69'	Stadium: Városi Stadion; Attendance: 1,455; Referee: Ádám Pillók

15 August 2021 3	Zalaegerszeg	1–3	Puskás Akadémia	Zalaegerszeg
17:45 CEST	Skribek 13'	Report	Favorov 54'; Puljić 67'; Corbu 90+2'	Stadium: ZTE Arena; Attendance: 1,737; Referee: Gergő Bogár
Note: The match is interrupted due to bad weather.

21 August 2021 4	Debrecen	1–2	Zalaegerszeg	Debrecen
16:00 CEST	Korhut 65'	Report	Skribek 29'; Grezda 86'	Stadium: Nagyerdei Stadion; Attendance: 4,800; Referee: Ferenc Karakó

27 August 2021 5	Zalaegerszeg	1–3	Budapest Honvéd	Zalaegerszeg
20:00 CEST	Serafimov 75'	Report	Lukić 9'; Hidi 13'; Tamás 70'	Stadium: ZTE Arena; Attendance: 1,862; Referee: Péter Antal

13 September 2021 6	Újpest	2–2	Zalaegerszeg	Budapest
20:00 CEST	Beridze 13'; Bjeloš 90+2'	Report	Koszta 82'; Špoljarić 90+3'	Stadium: Szusza Ferenc Stadion; Attendance: 1,308; Referee: Péter Solymosi

24 September 2021 7	Zalaegerszeg	2–5	Paks	Zalaegerszeg
20:00 CEST	Špoljarić 51'; Borukov 90+4' (pen.)	Report	Ádám 15'; Serafimov 38' (o.g.); Kinyik 54'; Balogh 58'; B. Szabó 84'	Stadium: ZTE Arena; Attendance: 1,214; Referee: Mihály Káprály

3 October 2021 8	Zalaegerszeg	2–0	MTK Budapest	Zalaegerszeg
14:15 CEST	Koszta 11', 85'	Report		Stadium: ZTE Arena; Attendance: 1,057; Referee: Sándor Andó-Szabó

16 October 2021 9	Ferencváros	1–2	Zalaegerszeg	Budapest
17:00 CEST	Vécsei 45'	Report	Serafimov 7'; Koszta 23'	Stadium: Groupama Arena; Attendance: 8,169; Referee: Ádám Farkas

22 October 2021 10	Zalaegerszeg	2–1	Gyirmót	Zalaegerszeg
15:00 CEST	Koszta 3'; Serafimov 35'	Report	Szegi 45'	Stadium: ZTE Arena; Attendance: 728; Referee: Péter Antal

31 October 2021 11	Kisvárda	5–0	Zalaegerszeg	Kisvárda
14:30 CET	Navrátil 19', 34'; Camaj 74', 83', 86'	Report		Stadium: Várkerti Stadion; Attendance: 2,043; Referee: Tamás Bognár

7 November 2021 12	Fehérvár	3–0	Zalaegerszeg	Székesfehérvár
17:30 CET	Kodro 17'; Petryak 37'; Dárdai 54'	Report		Stadium: MOL Aréna Sóstó; Attendance: 2,174; Referee: Gergő Bogár

19 November 2021 13	Zalaegerszeg	1–1	Mezőkövesd	Zalaegerszeg
20:00 CET	Koszta 70' (pen.)	Report	Nagy 90+2'	Stadium: ZTE Arena; Attendance: 703; Referee: Sándor Andó-Szabó

28 November 2021 14	Puskás Akadémia	1–1	Zalaegerszeg	Felcsút
15:45 CET	Plšek 47'	Report	Zimonyi 90+3'	Stadium: Pancho Aréna; Attendance: 600; Referee: Péter Solymosi

4 December 2021 15	Zalaegerszeg	2–1	Debrecen	Zalaegerszeg
17:30 CET	Koszta 26'; Ubochioma 70'	Report	Dzsudzsák 66'	Stadium: ZTE Arena; Attendance: 712; Referee: Bence Csonka

11 December 2021 16	Budapest Honvéd	2–2	Zalaegerszeg	Bozsik Stadion
17:15 CET	Lukić 5'; Zsótér 45'	Report	Koszta 63'; Lesjak 73'	Stadium: Budapest; Attendance: 2,082; Referee: József Erdős

19 December 2021 17	Zalaegerszeg	2–0	Újpest	Zalaegerszeg
18:45 CET	Halilović 59'; Ubochioma 67'	Report		Stadium: ZTE Arena; Attendance: 1,088; Referee: Tamás Bognár

29 January 2022 18	Paks	3–2	Zalaegerszeg	Paks
14:30 CET	Bognár 11'; Ádám 39', 67'	Report	Zimonyi 33', 62'	Stadium: Fehérvári úti Stadion; Attendance: 1,212; Referee: Péter Antal

=== Hungarian Cup ===
18 September 2021 Round of 64	Vác	0–4	Zalaegerszeg	Vác
15:00 CEST		Report	Borukov 43'; Zimonyi 78', 84'; Koszta 85'	Stadium: Városi Stadion; Referee: Eszter Urbán

27 October 2021 Round of 32	Zalaegerszeg	0–1 (a.e.t.)	Budapest Honvéd	Zalaegerszeg
19:30 CEST		Report	Nono 109'	Stadium: ZTE Arena; Attendance: 713; Referee: Csaba Pintér

=== Appearances and goals ===
Last updated on 30 January 2022.

No.	Pos	Nat	Player	Total		OTP Bank Liga		Hungarian Cup	
No.	Pos	Nat	Player	Apps	Goals	Apps	Goals	Apps	Goals
1	GK	(Hungary) HUN	Patrik Demjén	18	-36	18	-36	0	-0
3	DF	(Hungary) HUN	Dávid Kálnoki-Kis	14	0	14	0	0	0
4	DF	(Croatia) CRO	Zoran Lesjak	18	1	16	1	2	0
5	DF	(Hungary) HUN	Dávid Bobál	9	0	8	0	1	0
8	MF	(Hungary) HUN	Mátyás Tajti	13	0	11	0	2	0
9	FW	(Hungary) HUN	Márk Koszta	20	10	18	9	2	1
11	MF	(Croatia) CRO	Šime Gržan	1	0	1	0	0	0
14	FW	(Albania) ALB	Eros Grezda	5	1	5	1	0	0
16	FW	(Hungary) HUN	Dávid Zimonyi	15	5	13	3	2	2
17	DF	(Hungary) HUN	András Huszti	7	0	5	0	2	0
18	MF	(Montenegro) MNE	Bojan Sanković	18	0	16	0	2	0
21	MF	(Bosnia and Herzegovina) BIH	Emir Halilović	19	1	17	1	2	0
23	MF	(North Macedonia) MKD	Daniel Milovanovikj	8	0	6	0	2	0
27	MF	(Hungary) HUN	Bence Bedi	20	0	18	0	2	0
29	DF	(Hungary) HUN	Lóránt Sebestyén	3	0	2	0	1	0
31	DF	(North Macedonia) MKD	Nikola Serafimov	19	4	17	4	2	0
37	DF	(Hungary) HUN	Attila Mocsi	0	0	0	0	0	0
44	DF	(Hungary) HUN	Bence Gergényi	16	0	14	0	2	0
50	FW	(Croatia) CRO	Josip Špoljarić	17	2	15	2	2	0
68	MF	(Hungary) HUN	Ádám Halmai	0	0	0	0	0	0
70	FW	(Nigeria) NGR	Meshack Ubochioma	18	2	17	2	1	0
71	MF	(Hungary) HUN	Patrik Posztobányi	0	0	0	0	0	0
77	FW	(Hungary) HUN	Szabolcs Szalay	3	0	3	0	0	0
95	GK	(Hungary) HUN	Márton Gyurján	2	-1	0	-0	2	-1
97	FW	(Hungary) HUN	Dániel Németh	3	0	3	0	0	0
Youth players:
13	DF	(Hungary) HUN	Martin Majnovics	0	0	0	0	0	0
22	DF	(Hungary) HUN	Csongor Papp	0	0	0	0	0	0
24	FW	(Hungary) HUN	László Papp	0	0	0	0	0	0
46	GK	(Hungary) HUN	Bence Köcse	0	0	0	-0	0	-0
78	FW	(Hungary) HUN	Barnabás Fehér	0	0	0	0	0	0
Out to loan:
28	DF	(Hungary) HUN	Erik Németh	1	0	1	0	0	0
Players no longer at the club:
6	MF	(Mali) MLI	Bakary Nimaga	4	0	4	0	0	0
7	MF	(Hungary) HUN	Alen Skribek	19	2	17	2	2	0
10	FW	(Hungary) HUN	Benjamin Babati	13	1	12	1	1	0
11	FW	(Hungary) HUN	Péter Beke	0	0	0	0	0	0
99	FW	(Bulgaria) BUL	Preslav Borukov	5	2	4	1	1	1

=== Top scorers ===
Includes all competitive matches. The list is sorted by shirt number when total goals are equal.

Last updated on 30 January 2022

Position	Nation	Number	Name	OTP Bank Liga	Hungarian Cup	Total
1	(Hungary)	9	Márk Koszta	9	1	10
2	(Hungary)	16	Dávid Zimonyi	3	2	5
3	(North Macedonia)	31	Nikola Serafimov	4	0	4
4	(Hungary)	7	Alen Skribek	2	0	2
5	(Croatia)	50	Josip Špoljarić	2	0	2
6	(Nigeria)	70	Meshack Ubochioma	2	0	2
7	(Bulgaria)	99	Preslav Borukov	1	1	2
8	(Hungary)	10	Benjamin Babati	1	0	1
9	(Albania)	14	Eros Grezda	1	0	1
10	(Croatia)	4	Zoran Lesjak	1	0	1
11	(Bosnia and Herzegovina)	21	Emir Halilović	1	0	1
/	/	/	Own Goals	0	0	0
			TOTALS	27	4	31

=== Disciplinary record ===
Includes all competitive matches. Players with 1 card or more included only.

Last updated on 30 January 2022

Position	Nation	Number	Name	OTP Bank Liga		Hungarian Cup		Total (Hu Total)	
Position	Nation	Number	Name	Yellow card	Red card	Yellow card	Red card	Yellow card	Red card
DF	(Hungary)	3	Dávid Kálnoki-Kis	4	1	0	0	4 (4)	1 (1)
DF	(Croatia)	4	Zoran Lesjak	3	0	0	0	3 (3)	0 (0)
DF	(Hungary)	5	Dávid Bobál	1	1	0	0	1 (1)	1 (1)
MF	(Hungary)	7	Alen Skribek	1	0	0	0	1 (1)	0 (0)
MF	(Hungary)	8	Mátyás Tajti	2	0	1	0	3 (2)	0 (0)
FW	(Hungary)	9	Márk Koszta	2	0	0	0	2 (2)	0 (0)
FW	(Hungary)	10	Benjamin Babati	3	0	0	0	3 (3)	0 (0)
FW	(Albania)	14	Eros Grezda	1	0	0	0	1 (1)	0 (0)
FW	(Hungary)	16	Dávid Zimonyi	1	0	0	0	1 (1)	0 (0)
DF	(Hungary)	17	András Huszti	1	0	1	0	2 (1)	0 (0)
MF	(Montenegro)	18	Bojan Sanković	2	0	0	0	2 (2)	0 (0)
MF	(Bosnia and Herzegovina)	21	Emir Halilović	5	0	0	0	5 (5)	0 (0)
MF	(North Macedonia)	23	Daniel Milovanovikj	1	0	0	0	1 (1)	0 (0)
MF	(Hungary)	27	Bence Bedi	2	0	0	0	2 (2)	0 (0)
DF	(North Macedonia)	31	Nikola Serafimov	5	0	1	0	6 (5)	0 (0)
DF	(Hungary)	44	Bence Gergényi	2	0	1	0	3 (2)	0 (0)
FW	(Nigeria)	70	Meshack Ubochioma	4	0	0	0	4 (4)	0 (0)
FW	(Bulgaria)	99	Preslav Borukov	1	0	1	0	2 (1)	0 (0)
			TOTALS	39	2	5	0	44 (39)	2 (2)

=== Clean sheets ===
Last updated on 30 January 2022

Position	Nation	Number	Name	OTP Bank Liga	Hungarian Cup	Total
1	(Hungary)	1	Patrik Demjén	2	0	2
2	(Hungary)	95	Márton Gyurján	0	1	1
3	(Hungary)	46	Bence Köcse	0	0	0
			TOTALS	2	1	3
