= 2020–21 Zalaegerszegi TE season =

Zalaegerszegi TE
2020–21 season
- Chairman: Gábor Végh
- Manager: Gábor Boér
- Stadium: ZTE Arena
- Top goalscorer: League: Artem Favorov (7 goals); All: Artem Favorov (7 goals)
Home colours	Away colours

The 2019–20 season was Zalaegerszegi TE's 2nd competitive season, 40th consecutive season in the OTP Bank Liga and 100th year in existence as a football club.

== Transfers ==
=== Summer ===
In: Note: Flags indicate national team as defined under FIFA eligibility rules; some limited exceptions apply. Players may hold more than one non-FIFA nationality.

No.	Pos.	Nation	Player
—	MF	HUN	Bertalan Kun (from Győr)
—	FW	HUN	Dávid Zimonyi (from Lipót)
—	MF	HUN	Patrik Vass (from MTK Budapest)
—	GK	HUN	Márton Gyurján (from Haladás)
—	FW	HUN	Regő Szánthó (loan from Ferencváros)
—	MF	HUN	Mátyás Tajti (from (Poland) Zagłębie Lubin)
—	MF	MNE	Bojan Sanković (from (Kazakhstan) Irtysh Pavlodar)
—	FW	HUN	Filip Dragóner (from Mezőkövesd)
—	DF	SRB	Aleksandar Tanasin (from (Serbia) Proleter)
—	MF	HUN	Bence Szabó (from Debrecen)
—	FW	HUN	Norbert Könyves (from Paks)
—	DF	SVN	Žiga Živko (loan from (Slovenia) Nafta)
—	MF	HUN	Barnabás Kovács (from Dunaújváros)
—	FW	HUN	Márk Koszta (from Újpest)
—	MF	UKR	Artem Favorov (loan from Puskás Akadémia)
—	MF	HUN	Dániel Szökrönyös (loan return from Hévíz)
—	DF	HUN	Bence Gergényi (loan return from (Slovenia) Nafta)

Out: Note: Flags indicate national team as defined under FIFA eligibility rules; some limited exceptions apply. Players may hold more than one non-FIFA nationality.

No.	Pos.	Nation	Player
—	GK	HUN	Zoltán Kovács (to Budafok)
—	MF	SRB	Nikola Mitrović (to Újpest)
—	MF	HUN	Gergő Kocsis (to (Poland) Podbeskidzie)
—	FW	HUN	András Radó (to Vasas)
—	FW	HUN	Gergely Bobál (to (Portugal) Nacional)
—	FW	USA	Eric McWoods (to (Malta) Balzan)
—	FW	USA	Eduvie Ikoba (to (Slovakia) Trenčín)
—	MF	HUN	Zoltán Stieber (to Újpest)
—	GK	HUN	Norbert Szemerédi
—	MF	HUN	Dávid Barczi
—	DF	HUN	Bendegúz Bolla (loan return to Fehérvár)
—	DF	HUN	Krisztián Tamás (loan return to Fehérvár)
—	MF	HUN	Stjepan Oštrek (loan return to (Slovenia) Nafta)
—	MF	CYP	Fanos Katelaris (loan return to (Cyprus) Omonia Nicosia)
—	MF	HUN	Lukács Bőle (loan return to Ferencváros)
—	DF	CRO	Matija Katanec (loan return to Mezőkövesd)

=== Nemzeti Bajnokság I ===
==== League table ====
Pos	Team	Pld	W	D	L	GF	GA	GD	Pts	Qualification or relegation
7	MTK	33	11	9	13	44	49	−5	42	
8	Mezőkövesd	33	11	9	13	40	46	−6	42	
9	Zalaegerszeg	33	10	7	16	58	58	0	37	
10	Honvéd	33	9	10	14	46	48	−2	37	
11	Diósgyőr (R)	33	9	6	18	34	53	−19	33	Relegation to the Nemzeti Bajnokság II

Source: Hungarian Football Federation (in Hungarian), Soccerway
Rules for classification: 1) Points; 2) Matches won; 3) Goal difference; 4) Goals scored; 5) Head-to-head points; 6) Head-to-head goal difference; 7) Head-to-head away goals scored; 8) Fair play ranking; 9) Drawing of lots.
(R) Relegated

==== Results summary ====
Overall								Home						Away					
Pld	W	D	L	GF	GA	GD	Pts	W	D	L	GF	GA	GD	W	D	L	GF	GA	GD
18	6	4	8	34	34	0	22	3	2	4	20	19	+1	3	2	4	14	15	−1

Last updated: 15 May 2021.
Source: NB1

==== Results by round ====
Round	1	2	3	4	5	6	7	8	9	10	11	12	13	14	15	16	17	18	19	20	21	22	23	24	25	26	27	28	29	30	31	32	33
Ground	H	A	H	A	H	H	A	H	A	H	A	A	H	A	H	A	A	H															
Result	D	D	L	W	W	L	L	L	W	L	L	L	W	L	W	W	D	D															
Position	6	7	10	7	5	5	8	11	8	10	11	11	9	9	7	7	7	8															

Updated to match(es) played on 15 May 2021. Source: Matches
A = Away; H = Home; W = Win; D = Draw; L = Loss

==== Matches ====
18 August 2020 1	Zalaegerszeg	3 – 3	Fehérvár	Zalaegerszeg
18:35 CEST	Babati 2', 75' (pen.); Szépe 16'	Report	Evandro 11'; Nikolić 44' (pen.), 61'	Stadium: ZTE Arena; Attendance: 4,375; Referee: Gergő Bogár

21 August 2020 2	Mezőkövesd	1 – 1	Zalaegerszeg	Mezőkövesd
16:30 CEST	Jurina 63'	Report	Vass 37'	Stadium: Mezőkövesdi Városi Stadion; Attendance: 2,018; Referee: Péter Solymosi

30 August 2020 3	Zalaegerszeg	1 – 2	Ferencváros	Zalaegerszeg
17:45 CEST	Babati 83'	Report	Ćivić 40'; Kharatin 53'	Stadium: ZTE Arena; Attendance: 8,429; Referee: Csaba Pintér

13 September 2020 4	MTK Budapest	0 – 3	Zalaegerszeg	Budapest
17:30 CEST		Report	Favorov 42'; Bedi 75'; Szánthó 88'	Stadium: Hidegkuti Nándor Stadion; Attendance: 2,501; Referee: Ferenc Karakó

26 September 2020 5	Zalaegerszeg	3 – 1	Diósgyőr	Zalaegerszeg
19:30 CEST	Könyves 8', 31' (pen.); Koszta 77' (pen.)	Report	Hegedűs 45'	Stadium: ZTE Arena; Attendance: 2,825; Referee: Péter Antal

4 October 2020 6	Zalaegerszeg	2 – 4	Budapest Honvéd	Zalaegerszeg
15:00 CEST	Könyves 72'; Koszta 90+4'	Report	Tamás 7'; Szendrei 29'; Balogh 48'; Traoré 86'	Stadium: ZTE Arena; Attendance: 2,716; Referee: Tamás Bognár

18 October 2020 7	Paks	3 – 1	Zalaegerszeg	Paks
14:30 CEST	Balogh 47'; Gévay 48'; Hahn 75'	Report	Könyves 25'	Stadium: Fehérvári úti Stadion; Attendance: 1,602; Referee: Péter Solymosi

25 October 2020 8	Zalaegerszeg	1 – 3	Budafok	Zalaegerszeg
14:30 CET	Szalai 10'	Report	Kovács 12'; Kulcsár 22'; Skribek 76'	Stadium: ZTE Arena; Attendance: 1,896; Referee: József Erdős

31 October 2020 9	Puskás Akadémia	1 – 2	Zalaegerszeg	Felcsút
14:45 CET	Mance 13'	Report	Lesjak 20'; Szánthó 53'	Stadium: Pancho Aréna; Attendance: 789; Referee: Péter Zierkelbach

8 November 2020 10	Zalaegerszeg	1 – 2	Kisvárda	Zalaegerszeg
14:30 CET	Koszta 64'	Report	Viana 11' (pen.); Navrátil 52'	Stadium: ZTE Arena; Attendance: 815; Referee: Péter Solymosi

23 December 2020 11	Újpest	3 – 2	Zalaegerszeg	Budapest
18:00 CET	Csongvai 35'; Tallo 62', 65'	Report	Könyves 41'; Favorov 64'	Stadium: Szusza Ferenc Stadion; Attendance: no spectators Referee: Péter Solymosi

28 November 2020 12	Fehérvár	2 – 0	Zalaegerszeg	Székesfehérvár
17:00 CET	Zivzivadze 12'; Houri 21'	Report		Stadium: MOL Aréna Sóstó; Attendance: no spectators Referee: József Erdős

5 December 2020 13	Zalaegerszeg	3 – 0	Mezőkövesd	Zalaegerszeg
14:45 CET	Zimonyi 19'; Szépe 44'; Szánthó 80'	Report		Stadium: ZTE Arena; Attendance: no spectators Referee: Gergő Bogár

12 December 2020 14	Ferencváros	2 – 0	Zalaegerszeg	Budapest
17:00 CET	Laïdouni 68'; Baturina 70'	Report		Stadium: Groupama Arena; Attendance: no spectators Referee: Mihály Káprály

16 December 2020 15	Zalaegerszeg	2 – 0	MTK Budapest	Zalaegerszeg
18:00 CET	Zimonyi 5'; Szánthó 12'	Report		Stadium: ZTE Arena; Attendance: no spectators Referee: Péter Solymosi

19 December 2020 16	Diósgyőr	1 – 3	Zalaegerszeg	Miskolc
17:00 CET	Iszlai 78' (pen.)	Report	Zimonyi 16', 65'; Szánthó 43'	Stadium: DVTK Stadion; Attendance: no spectators Referee: Gergő Bogár

24 January 2021 17	Budapest Honvéd	2 – 2	Zalaegerszeg	Budapest
18:00 CET	Hidi 27'; Gazdag 77' (pen.)	Report	Szépe 66'; Bedi 74'	Stadium: Hidegkuti Nándor Stadion; Attendance: no spectators Referee: Péter Solymosi

31 January 2021 18	Zalaegerszeg	4 – 4	Paks	Zalaegerszeg
14:10 CET	Szépe 6'; Favorov 46'; Babati 78'; Könyves 83'	Report	Bognár 31', 74'; Hahn 38'; Papp 90+4'	Stadium: ZTE Arena; Attendance: no spectators Referee: Csaba Pintér

=== Hungarian Cup ===
19 September 2020 Round 6	Mezőkeresztes	0 – 11	Zalaegerszeg	Mezőkeresztes
15:00 CEST		Report	Dragóner 2', 44', 58'; Koszta 17', 50', 57', 80'; Vass 34'; Zimonyi 70', 83'; Bobál 76'	Stadium: Városi Sportpálya; Attendance: 400; Referee: József Ducsai

28 October 2020 Round of 64	Lipót	1 – 3	Zalaegerszeg	Lipót
12:30 CET	Füredi 6'	Report	Szépe 8'; Bobál 27'; Szánthó 51' (pen.)	Stadium: Városi Sportpálya; Attendance: 310; Referee: Ádám Németh

== Statistics ==
=== Appearances and goals ===
Last updated on 15 May 2021.

No.	Pos	Nat	Player	Total		OTP Bank Liga		Hungarian Cup	
No.	Pos	Nat	Player	Apps	Goals	Apps	Goals	Apps	Goals
1	GK	(Hungary) HUN	Patrik Demjén	18	-35	18	-35	0	0
3	DF	(Hungary) HUN	Dávid Kálnoki-Kis	1	0	1	0	0	0
4	DF	(Croatia) CRO	Zoran Lesjak	18	1	17	1	1	0
5	DF	(Hungary) HUN	Dávid Bobál	20	2	18	0	2	2
6	DF	(Hungary) HUN	Dániel Szalai	11	1	9	1	2	0
7	MF	(Hungary) HUN	Patrik Vass	17	2	15	1	2	1
8	MF	(Hungary) HUN	Mátyás Tajti	9	0	8	0	1	0
9	FW	(Hungary) HUN	Márk Koszta	15	7	14	3	1	4
10	FW	(Hungary) HUN	Benjamin Babati	18	4	16	4	2	0
11	FW	(Hungary) HUN	Regő Szánthó	17	6	16	5	1	1
16	FW	(Hungary) HUN	Dávid Zimonyi	12	6	11	4	1	2
17	MF	(Portugal) POR	Sandro Semedo	1	0	0	0	1	0
18	MF	(Montenegro) MNE	Bojan Sanković	19	0	18	0	1	0
19	DF	(Slovakia) SVK	János Szépe	13	5	12	4	1	1
20	MF	(Hungary) HUN	Barnabás Kovács	8	0	7	0	1	0
21	MF	(Hungary) HUN	Bertalan Kun	2	0	1	0	1	0
22	DF	(Serbia) SRB	Aleksandar Tanasin	12	0	10	0	2	0
23	FW	(Hungary) HUN	Márkó Futács	2	0	2	0	0	0
25	MF	(Ukraine) UKR	Artem Favorov	16	3	14	3	2	0
27	DF	(Hungary) HUN	Bence Bedi	18	2	17	2	1	0
28	DF	(Hungary) HUN	Erik Németh	1	0	1	0	0	0
36	DF	(Slovakia) SVK	Žiga Živko	5	0	4	0	1	0
42	FW	(Hungary) HUN	Norbert Könyves	15	6	15	6	0	0
44	DF	(Hungary) HUN	Bence Gergényi	20	0	18	0	2	0
71	FW	(Hungary) HUN	Filip Dragóner	9	3	7	0	2	3
95	GK	(Hungary) HUN	Márton Gyurján	2	-1	0	-0	2	-1
Youth players:
23	MF	(Hungary) HUN	Bence Szabó	0	0	0	0	0	0
24	FW	(Hungary) HUN	László Papp	0	0	0	0	0	0
46	GK	(Hungary) HUN	Bence Köcse	0	0	0	-0	0	-0
77	FW	(Hungary) HUN	Szabolcs Szalay	0	0	0	0	0	0

=== Top scorers ===
Includes all competitive matches. The list is sorted by shirt number when total goals are equal.

Last updated on 15 May 2021

Position	Nation	Number	Name	OTP Bank Liga	Hungarian Cup	Total
1	(Hungary)	9	Márk Koszta	3	4	7
2	(Hungary)	42	Norbert Könyves	6	0	6
3	(Hungary)	11	Regő Szánthó	5	1	6
4	(Hungary)	16	Dávid Zimonyi	4	2	6
5	(Slovakia)	19	János Szépe	4	1	5
6	(Hungary)	10	Benjamin Babati	4	0	4
7	(Ukraine)	25	Artem Favorov	7	0	7
8	(Hungary)	71	Filip Dragóner	0	3	3
9	(Hungary)	27	Bence Bedi	2	0	2
10	(Hungary)	7	Patrik Vass	1	1	2
11	(Hungary)	5	Dávid Bobál	0	2	2
12	(Croatia)	4	Zoran Lesjak	1	0	1
13	(Hungary)	6	Dániel Szalai	1	0	1
/	/	/	Own Goals	0	0	0
			TOTALS	37	14	51

=== Disciplinary record ===
Includes all competitive matches. Players with 1 card or more included only.

Last updated on 15 May 2021

Position	Nation	Number	Name	OTP Bank Liga		Hungarian Cup		Total (Hu Total)	
Position	Nation	Number	Name	Booked	Sent off (straight red)	Booked	Sent off (straight red)	Booked	Sent off (straight red)
DF	(Hungary)	3	Erik Németh	1	0	0	0	1 (1)	0 (0)
DF	(Croatia)	4	Zoran Lesjak	3	1	0	0	3 (3)	1 (1)
DF	(Hungary)	5	Dávid Bobál	2	0	0	0	2 (2)	0 (0)
DF	(Hungary)	6	Dániel Szalai	2	1	1	0	3 (2)	1 (1)
MF	(Hungary)	7	Patrik Vass	1	0	0	0	1 (1)	0 (0)
MF	(Hungary)	8	Mátyás Tajti	1	0	0	0	1 (1)	0 (0)
FW	(Hungary)	9	Márk Koszta	1	0	0	0	1 (1)	0 (0)
FW	(Hungary)	11	Regő Szánthó	4	0	0	0	4 (4)	0 (0)
MF	(Montenegro)	18	Bojan Sanković	3	0	0	0	3 (3)	0 (0)
FW	(Hungary)	16	Dávid Zimonyi	1	0	0	0	1 (1)	0 (0)
MF	(Montenegro)	18	Bojan Sanković	1	0	0	0	1 (1)	0 (0)
DF	(Slovakia)	19	János Szépe	1	0	0	0	1 (1)	0 (0)
MF	(Hungary)	20	Barnabás Kovács	1	0	0	0	1 (1)	0 (0)
DF	(Serbia)	22	Aleksandar Tanasin	1	0	0	0	1 (1)	0 (0)
MF	(Ukraine)	25	Artem Favorov	2	0	0	0	2 (2)	0 (0)
MF	(Hungary)	27	Bence Bedi	2	0	0	0	2 (2)	0 (0)
DF	(Slovenia)	36	Žiga Živko	1	0	0	0	1 (1)	0 (0)
FW	(Hungary)	42	Norbert Könyves	2	0	0	0	2 (2)	0 (0)
DF	(Hungary)	44	Bence Gergényi	4	0	0	0	4 (4)	0 (0)
			TOTALS	34	2	1	0	35 (34)	2 (2)

=== Overall ===
Games played	20 (18 OTP Bank Liga and 2 Hungarian Cup)
Games won	8 (6 OTP Bank Liga and 2 Hungarian Cup)
Games drawn	4 (4 OTP Bank Liga and 0 Hungarian Cup)
Games lost	8 (8 OTP Bank Liga and 0 Hungarian Cup)
Goals scored	48
Goals conceded	35
Goal difference	+13
Yellow cards	35
Red cards	2
Worst discipline	(Hungary) Dániel Szalai (3 (yellow card) , 1 (red card) )
Worst discipline	(Croatia) Zoran Lesjak (3 (yellow card) , 1 (red card) )
Best result	11–0 (A) v Mezőkeresztes - Hungarian Cup - 19-9-2020
Worst result	2–4 (H) v Budapest Honvéd - Nemzeti Bajnokság I - 4-10-2020
Worst result	1–3 (A) v Paks - Nemzeti Bajnokság I - 18-10-2020
Worst result	1–3 (H) v Budafok - Nemzeti Bajnokság I - 25-10-2020
Most appearances	(Hungary) Dávid Bobál (20 appearances)
Most appearances	(Hungary) Bence Gergényi (20 appearances)
Top scorer	(Hungary) Márk Koszta (7 goals)
Points	28/60 (43.58%)

Last updated: 15 May 2021
