= 2021–22 Mezőkövesdi SE season =

Mezőkövesd
2021–22 season
- Chairman: Attila Tállai
- Manager: Attila Pintér
- Stadium: Városi Stadion
Home colours	Away colours

The 2021–22 season will be Mezőkövesdi SE's 7th competitive season, 6th consecutive season in the OTP Bank Liga and 44th year in existence as a football club.

== Squad ==
As of 22 July 2021

Note: Flags indicate national team as defined under FIFA eligibility rules; some limited exceptions apply. Players may hold more than one non-FIFA nationality.

No.	Pos.	Nation	Player
1	GK	HUN	Botond Antal
3	DF	HUN	Ákos Baki
5	DF	ESP	Héctor Martínez
6	MF	HUN	Zoltán Derekas
7	FW	ROU	Andreias Calcan
8	MF	HUN	Benjámin Cseke
9	FW	SRB	Stefan Dražić
10	MF	BIH	Dino Beširović
11	FW	SVK	Jakub Vojtuš
12	DF	GEO	Luka Lakvekheliani
13	GK	HUN	Levente Bősz
14	MF	BLR	Alyaksandr Karnitsky
15	DF	HUN	András Vági
17	DF	SVK	Róbert Pillár
19	DF	SVK	János Szépe

No.	Pos.	Nation	Player
20	MF	HUN	Gergő Kocsis
21	MF	SVK	Martin Chrien
22	DF	SRB	Daniel Farkaš
23	DF	HUN	Dániel Vadnai
24	FW	HUN	Tamás Cseri (captain)
30	MF	POR	Rui Pedro
32	DF	CRO	Matija Katanec
39	FW	BUL	Antonio Vutov
55	MF	HUN	Dániel Nagy
77	MF	UKR	Shandor Vayda
93	GK	ITA	Riccardo Piscitelli
95	MF	HUN	Márk Madarász
96	GK	ROU	Árpád Tordai
99	FW	BIH	Marin Jurina

== Transfers ==
=== Summer ===
In: Note: Flags indicate national team as defined under FIFA eligibility rules; some limited exceptions apply. Players may hold more than one non-FIFA nationality.

No.	Pos.	Nation	Player
1	GK	HUN	Botond Antal (from Diósgyőr)
3	DF	HUN	Ákos Baki (from MTK Budapest)
5	DF	ESP	Héctor Martínez (from (Cyprus) AEK Larnaca)
6	MF	HUN	Zoltán Derekas (from Ferencváros II)
7	FW	ROU	Andreias Calcan (from (Romania) Politehnica Iasi)
8	MF	HUN	Benjámin Cseke (from MTK Budapest)
9	FW	SRB	Stefan Dražić (from Diósgyőr)
13	GK	HUN	Levente Bősz (from (Romania) Politehnica Iasi)
15	DF	HUN	András Vági (from Paks)
19	DF	SVK	János Szépe (from Zalaegerszeg)
20	MF	HUN	Gergő Kocsis (from (Poland) Podbeskidzie)
26	DF	HUN	Márk Jagodics (loan return from Budafok)
93	GK	ITA	Riccardo Piscitelli (from (Portugal) Nacional)
95	MF	HUN	Márk Madarász (from Puskás Akadémia)
96	GK	ROU	Árpád Tordai (from (Romania) Farul Constanța)
—	DF	HUN	Máté Kotula (loan return from Szolnok)
—	FW	HUN	Alexander Torvund (loan return from Szentlőrinc)
—	MF	HUN	Zoltán Varjas (loan return from Siófok)

Out: Note: Flags indicate national team as defined under FIFA eligibility rules; some limited exceptions apply. Players may hold more than one non-FIFA nationality.

No.	Pos.	Nation	Player
3	DF	GRE	Konstantinos Dimitriou (to (Greece) Panserraikos)
4	DF	HUN	Gábor Eperjesi (to Diósgyőr)
5	DF	UKR	Andriy Nesterov (to (Ukraine) Polissya Zhytomyr)
8	MF	HUN	Máté Tóth (to Szombathelyi Haladás)
8	FW	GEO	Nodar Kavtaradze (to (Georgia (country)) Dinamo Tbilisi)
16	GK	SRB	Branimir Aleksić
18	MF	AUT	Manuel Martic
21	MF	CRO	Karlo Kamenar (to (Bosnia and Herzegovina) Zrinjski Mostar)
25	GK	HUN	Péter Szappanos (to Budapest Honvéd)
26	DF	HUN	Márk Jagodics (to Budafok)
27	FW	MLI	Ulysse Diallo
28	FW	RUS	Serder Serderov (to (Croatia) Istra)
30	GK	HUN	Eduárd Fedinisinec (to Balassagyarmat)
31	MF	HUN	Dávid Barczi (to III. Kerület)
97	MF	UKR	Mykhaylo Meskhi (to (Ukraine) Minaj)
—	DF	HUN	Máté Kotula (loan to Budafok)
—	FW	HUN	Alexander Torvund (loan to Csákvár)
—	MF	HUN	Zoltán Varjas (to Siófok)
—	MF	HUN	Péter Takács (to Putnok)
—	FW	HUN	László Varjas (to Hidasnémeti)
—	MF	HUN	Dominik Tóth (to Hidasnémeti)
—	FW	HUN	Márk Bencze (to Csákvár)

=== Winter ===
In: Note: Flags indicate national team as defined under FIFA eligibility rules; some limited exceptions apply. Players may hold more than one non-FIFA nationality.

No.	Pos.	Nation	Player
—	MF	HUN	Benjamin Babati (from Zalaegerszeg)
—	DF	NGR	George Ikenne (from MTK Budapest)
—	MF	ALB	Kamer Qaka (from (North Macedonia) Shkëndija)
—	DF	CRO	Andrej Lukić (from (Croatia) Hrvatski Dragovoljac)
—	DF	ALB	Amir Bilali (from (Romania) Academica Clinceni)
—	DF	CZE	Denis Granečný (loan from (Czech Republic) Baník Ostrava)
—	FW	CRO	Tomislav Kiš (from (Lithuania) FK Žalgiris Vilnius)

Out: Note: Flags indicate national team as defined under FIFA eligibility rules; some limited exceptions apply. Players may hold more than one non-FIFA nationality.

No.	Pos.	Nation	Player
5	DF	ESP	Héctor Martínez (to (Spain) Real Murcia)
11	FW	SVK	Jakub Vojtuš (to (Romania) Rapid București)
19	DF	SVK	János Szépe (to MTK Budapest)

== Competitions ==
=== Overview ===
Competition	First match	Last match	Starting round	Final position	Record							
Competition	First match	Last match	Starting round	Final position	Pld	W	D	L	GF	GA	GD	Win %
Nemzeti Bajnokság I	30 July 2021	13 May 2022	Matchday 1	10th	33	10	8	15	37	49	−12	30.30
Hungarian Cup	18 September 2021	27 October 2021	Round of 64	Round of 32	2	1	1	0	3	1	+2	50.00
Total					35	11	9	15	40	50	−10	31.43

Last updated: 14 May 2022
Source: Competitions

=== Nemzeti Bajnokság I ===
==== League table ====
Pos	Team	Pld	W	D	L	GF	GA	GD	Pts	Qualification or relegation
8	Zalaegerszeg	33	10	9	14	44	58	−14	39	
9	Honvéd	33	10	8	15	48	51	−3	38	
10	Mezőkövesd	33	10	8	15	37	49	−12	38	
11	MTK (R)	33	9	9	15	28	50	−22	36	Relegation to the Nemzeti Bajnokság II
12	Gyirmót (R)	33	7	11	15	34	49	−15	32	Relegation to the Nemzeti Bajnokság II

Source: Hungarian Football Federation (in Hungarian), Soccerway
Rules for classification: 1) Points; 2) Matches won; 3) Goal difference; 4) Goals scored; 5) Head-to-head points; 6) Head-to-head goal difference; 7) Head-to-head away goals scored; 8) Fair play ranking; 9) Drawing of lots.
(R) Relegated

==== Results summary ====
Overall								Home						Away					
Pld	W	D	L	GF	GA	GD	Pts	W	D	L	GF	GA	GD	W	D	L	GF	GA	GD
33	10	8	15	37	49	−12	38	4	6	6	16	21	−5	6	2	9	21	28	−7

Last updated: 14 May 2022.
Source: Soccerway

==== Results by round ====
Round	1	2	3	4	5	6	7	8	9	10	11	12	13	14	15	16	17	18	19	20	21	22	23	24	25	26	27	28	29	30	31	32	33
Ground	A	H	A	H	A	H	A	A	H	A	H	H	A	H	A	H	A	H	H	A	H	A	A	H	A	H	A	H	A	A	H	A	H
Result	W	W	L	D	L	D	L	L	W	W	D	W	D	L	W	L	L	D	L	W	D	L	L	D	L	W	W	L	W	L	L	D	L
Position	2	1	3	4	8	7	9	10	8	6	5	5	5	5	5	5	6	6	7	6	7	8	10	10	10	10	8	9	8	8	9	9	10

Updated to match(es) played on 15 May 2022. Source: Matches
A = Away; H = Home; W = Win; D = Draw; L = Loss

==== Matches ====
30 July 2021 1	Paks	2–3	Mezőkövesd	Paks
18:15 CEST	Sajbán 54'; Hahn 76'	Report	Beširović 21'; Jurina 47'; Calcan 80'	Stadium: Fehérvári úti Stadion; Attendance: 1,311; Referee: Balázs Berke

7 August 2021 2	Mezőkövesd	3–2	Zalaegerszeg	Mezőkövesd
17:45 CEST	Jurina 15'; Cseri 54' (pen.); Beširović 83'	Report	Koszta 67'; Serafimov 69'	Stadium: Városi Stadion; Attendance: 1,455; Referee: Ádám Pillók

14 August 2021 3	Ferencváros	4–1	Mezőkövesd	Budapest
18:15 CEST	Boli 47', 90+5'; Mak 49'; Uzuni 69' (pen.)	Report	Nagy 7'	Stadium: Groupama Arena; Attendance: 5,677; Referee: Csaba Pintér

22 August 2021 4	Mezőkövesd	0–0	Gyirmót	Mezőkövesd
15:45 CEST		Report		Stadium: Városi Stadion; Attendance: 1,550; Referee: Gergő Bogár

28 August 2021 5	Kisvárda	2–0	Mezőkövesd	Kisvárda
16:00 CEST	Mešanović 35'; Navrátil 64'	Report		Stadium: Várkerti Stadion; Attendance: 2,289; Referee: Mihály Káprály

11 September 2021 6	Mezőkövesd	2–2	Fehérvár	Mezőkövesd
20:00 CEST	Nagy 39'; Jurina 90+4'	Report	Nikolić 70'; Heister 81'	Stadium: Városi Stadion; Attendance: 800; Referee: Tamás Bognár

25 September 2021 7	MTK Budapest	1–0	Mezőkövesd	Budapest
14:45 CEST	Miovski 90'	Report		Stadium: Hidegkuti Nándor Stadion; Attendance: 1,537; Referee: Ádám Farkas

2 October 2021 8	Puskás Akadémia	2–0	Mezőkövesd	Felcsút
17:00 CEST	Lakvekheliani 19' (o.g.); Băluță 63'	Report		Stadium: Pancho Aréna; Attendance: 822; Referee: Csaba Pintér

17 October 2021 9	Mezőkövesd	1–0	Debrecen	Mezőkövesd
17:00 CEST	Dražić 84'	Report		Stadium: Városi Stadion; Attendance: 2,019; Referee: Gergő Bogár

24 October 2021 10	Budapest Honvéd	2–3	Mezőkövesd	Bozsik Stadion
15:45 CEST	Nono 69'; Lukić 82'	Report	Vojtuš 7'; Madarász 85'; Cseri 90+3' (pen.)	Stadium: Budapest; Attendance: 3,253; Referee: Tamás Bognár

30 October 2021 11	Mezőkövesd	2–2	Újpest	Mezőkövesd
14:45 CEST	Jurina 18'; Koutroumpis 61' (o.g.)	Report	Kocsis 26' (o.g.); Bjeloš 82'	Stadium: Városi Stadion; Attendance: 1,820; Referee: Péter Solymosi

6 November 2021 12	Mezőkövesd	2–1	Paks	Mezőkövesd
14:45 CET	Dražić 18'; Jurina 72'	Report	Sajbán 44'	Stadium: Városi Stadion; Attendance: 1,426; Referee: Péter Antal

19 November 2021 13	Zalaegerszeg	1–1	Mezőkövesd	Zalaegerszeg
20:00 CET	Koszta 70' (pen.)	Report	Nagy 90+2'	Stadium: ZTE Arena; Attendance: 703; Referee: Sándor Andó-Szabó

28 November 2021 14	Mezőkövesd	0–3	Ferencváros	Mezőkövesd
18:00 CET		Report	R. Mmaee 7' (pen.); Nguen 41'; Boli 87'	Stadium: Városi Stadion; Attendance: 2,241; Referee: Gergő Bogár

4 December 2021 15	Gyirmót	0–1	Mezőkövesd	Győr
13:00 CET		Report	Pillár 47'	Stadium: Ménfői úti Stadion; Attendance: 785; Referee: István Vad

12 December 2021 16	Mezőkövesd	0–2	Kisvárda	Mezőkövesd
18:45 CET		Report	Prenga 67'; Mešanović 76'	Stadium: Városi Stadion; Attendance: 1,211; Referee: Ádám Farkas

18 December 2021 17	Fehérvár	1–0	Mezőkövesd	Székesfehérvár
19:30 CET	Kodro 42'	Report		Stadium: MOL Aréna Sóstó; Attendance: 1,276; Referee: Ferenc Karakó

30 January 2022 18	Mezőkövesd	1–1	MTK Budapest	Mezőkövesd
15:15 CET	Babati 9'	Report	Futács 50'	Stadium: Városi Stadion; Attendance: 1,259; Referee: Gergő Bogár

6 February 2022 19	Mezőkövesd	1–2	Puskás Akadémia	Mezőkövesd
14:15 CET	Jurina 68'	Report	Băluță 14', 64'	Stadium: Városi Stadion; Attendance: 600; Referee: Balázs Berke

12 February 2022 20	Debrecen	1–4	Mezőkövesd	Debrecen
17:00 CET	Dzsudzsák 45' (pen.)	Report	Jurina 20', 88'; Vadnai 64'; Beširović 68'	Stadium: Nagyerdei Stadion; Attendance: 2,850; Referee: Tamás Bognár

18 February 2022 21	Mezőkövesd	0–0	Budapest Honvéd	Mezőkövesd
20:00 CET		Report		Stadium: Mezőkövesdi Városi Stadion; Attendance: 1,376; Referee: Bence Csonka

27 February 2022 22	Újpest	3–1	Mezőkövesd	Budapest
14:30 CET	Zivzivadze 35', 53'; Bjeloš 85'	Report	Cseri 45'	Stadium: Szusza Ferenc Stadion; Attendance: 2,606; Referee: Ferenc Karakó

5 March 2022 23	Paks	4–0	Mezőkövesd	Paks
14:30 CET	Ádám 48' (pen.), 50'; B. Szabó 68'; J. Szabó 84'	Report		Stadium: Fehérvári úti Stadion; Attendance: 1,250; Referee: Sándor Andó-Szabó

12 March 2022 24	Mezőkövesd	0–0	Zalaegerszeg	Mezőkövesd
17:00 CET		Report		Stadium: Mezőkövesdi Városi Stadion; Attendance: 800; Referee: Ádám Pillók

18 March 2022 25	Ferencváros	1–0	Mezőkövesd	Budapest
20:00 CET	Nguen 3'	Report		Stadium: Groupama Arena; Attendance: 6,517; Referee: Gergő Bogár

1 April 2022 26	Mezőkövesd	1–0	Gyirmót	Mezőkövesd
20:00 CEST	Jurina 20'	Report	Zeke (red card) 63'	Stadium: Városi Stadion; Attendance: 1,119; Referee: Csaba Pintér

9 April 2022 27	Kisvárda	1–2	Mezőkövesd	Kisvárda
14:45 CEST	Karabelyov 30'	Report	Jurina 7'; Cseke 67'	Stadium: Várkerti Stadion; Attendance: 1,520; Referee: Bence Csonka

17 April 2022 28	Mezőkövesd	1–2	Fehérvár	Mezőkövesd
14:30 CEST	Dražić 48'	Report	Kodro 17'; Petryak 77'	Stadium: Városi Stadion; Attendance: 1,651; Referee: Ferenc Karakó

22 April 2022 29	MTK Budapest	0–4	Mezőkövesd	Budapest
20:00 CEST	Sluka (red card) 82'	Report	Dražić 13'; Pillár 23'; Lukić 71'; Kiš 83'	Stadium: Hidegkuti Nándor Stadion; Attendance: 1,950; Referee: Balázs Berke

30 April 2022 30	Puskás Akadémia	3–1	Mezőkövesd	Felcsút
14:45 CEST	Urblík 31'; Zahedi 44', 50'	Report	Dražić 28'	Stadium: Pancho Aréna; Attendance: 700; Referee: József Erdős

3 May 2022 31	Mezőkövesd	0–1	Debrecen	Mezőkövesd
16:30 CEST		Report	Pávkovics 45'	Stadium: Mezőkövesdi Városi Stadion; Attendance: 1,417; Referee: Tamás Bognár

7 May 2022 32	Budapest Honvéd	0–0	Mezőkövesd	Budapest
17:00 CEST	Machach (yellow card) 25' (yellow-red card) 38'	Report		Stadium: Bozsik Aréna; Attendance: 3,155; Referee: Ferenc Karakó

13 May 2022 33	Mezőkövesd	2–3	Újpest	Mezőkövesd
20:15 CET	Jurina 3'; Beširović 90+3'	Report	Katona 59'; Beridze 66'; Zivzivadze 71'	Stadium: Városi Stadion; Attendance: 2,520; Referee: Mihály Káprály

=== Hungarian Cup ===
18 September 2021 Round of 64	Komárom	0–2	Mezőkövesd	Komárom
15:00 CEST		Report	Cseri 22' (pen.); Dražić 43'	Stadium: Molaji Sporttelep; Referee: Marcell Derdák

27 October 2021 Round of 32	Szeged	1–1 (a.e.t.) (3–1 p)	Mezőkövesd	Szeged
18:00 CEST	Tóth 31'	Report	Calcan 14'	Stadium: Szent Gellért Fórum; Attendance: 1,000; Referee: Péter Antal
	Penalties
	Haruna (penalty scored); Simon (penalty missed); Vári (penalty scored); Horváth (penalty scored)		Cseri (penalty scored); Dražić (penalty missed); Derekas (penalty missed); Cseke (penalty missed)
Note: Szeged won on penalty kicks 3–1.

=== Appearances and goals ===
Last updated on 13 March 2022.

No.	Pos	Nat	Player	Total		OTP Bank Liga		Hungarian Cup	
No.	Pos	Nat	Player	Apps	Goals	Apps	Goals	Apps	Goals
1	GK	(Hungary) HUN	Botond Antal	5	-10	4	-10	1	-0
3	DF	(Hungary) HUN	Ákos Baki	2	0	1	0	1	0
4	DF	(Croatia) CRO	Andrej Lukić	6	0	6	0	0	0
6	MF	(Hungary) HUN	Zoltán Derekas	7	0	5	0	2	0
7	FW	(Romania) ROU	Andreias Calcan	23	2	21	1	2	1
8	MF	(Hungary) HUN	Benjámin Cseke	22	0	20	0	2	0
9	FW	(Serbia) SRB	Stefan Dražić	23	3	21	2	2	1
10	MF	(Bosnia and Herzegovina) BIH	Dino Beširović	21	3	20	3	1	0
11	MF	(Hungary) HUN	Benjamin Babati	7	1	7	1	0	0
12	DF	(Georgia (country)) GEO	Luka Lakvekheliani	10	0	9	0	1	0
13	GK	(Hungary) HUN	Levente Bősz	0	0	0	-0	0	-0
14	MF	(Belarus) BLR	Alyaksandr Karnitsky	18	0	18	0	0	0
15	DF	(Hungary) HUN	András Vági	1	0	1	0	0	0
17	DF	(Slovakia) SVK	Róbert Pillár	16	1	15	1	1	0
18	DF	(Czech Republic) CZE	Denis Granečný	4	0	4	0	0	0
20	DF	(Nigeria) NGR	George Ikenne	5	0	5	0	0	0
21	MF	(Hungary) HUN	Gergő Kocsis	20	0	18	0	2	0
21	MF	(Slovakia) SVK	Martin Chrien	11	0	9	0	2	0
22	DF	(Serbia) SRB	Daniel Farkaš	21	0	19	0	2	0
23	DF	(Hungary) HUN	Dániel Vadnai	12	1	12	1	0	0
24	MF	(Hungary) HUN	Tamás Cseri	25	4	23	3	2	1
32	DF	(Croatia) CRO	Matija Katanec	11	0	11	0	0	0
39	FW	(Bulgaria) BUL	Antonio Vutov	15	0	14	0	1	0
44	DF	(Albania) ALB	Amir Bilali	4	0	4	0	0	0
50	FW	(Croatia) CRO	Tomislav Kiš	6	0	6	0	0	0
55	MF	(Hungary) HUN	Dániel Nagy	18	3	16	3	2	0
77	MF	(Ukraine) UKR	Shandor Vayda	1	0	1	0	0	0
92	MF	(Albania) ALB	Kamer Qaka	7	0	7	0	0	0
93	GK	(Italy) ITA	Riccardo Piscitelli	6	-7	6	-7	0	-0
95	MF	(Hungary) HUN	Márk Madarász	17	1	15	1	2	0
96	GK	(Romania) ROU	Árpád Tordai	16	-21	14	-20	2	-1
99	FW	(Bosnia and Herzegovina) BIH	Marin Jurina	25	8	23	8	2	0
Youth players:
33	GK	(Ukraine) UKR	Danylo Ryabenko	0	0	0	-0	0	-0
33	GK	(Hungary) HUN	Péter Bazsányi	0	0	0	-0	0	-0
Out to loan:
Players no longer at the club:
5	DF	(Spain) ESP	Héctor Martínez	3	0	2	0	1	0
11	FW	(Slovakia) SVK	Jakub Vojtuš	11	1	10	1	1	0
19	DF	(Slovakia) SVK	János Szépe	10	0	9	0	1	0

=== Top scorers ===
Includes all competitive matches. The list is sorted by shirt number when total goals are equal.

Last updated on 13 March 2022

Position	Nation	Number	Name	OTP Bank Liga	Hungarian Cup	Total
1	(Bosnia and Herzegovina)	99	Marin Jurina	8	0	8
2	(Hungary)	24	Tamás Cseri	3	1	4
3	(Hungary)	55	Dániel Nagy	3	0	3
4	(Bosnia and Herzegovina)	10	Dino Beširović	3	0	3
5	(Serbia)	9	Stefan Dražić	2	1	3
6	(Romania)	7	Andreias Calcan	1	1	2
7	(Slovakia)	11	Jakub Vojtuš	1	0	1
8	(Hungary)	95	Márk Madarász	1	0	1
9	(Slovakia)	17	Róbert Pillár	1	0	1
10	(Hungary)	11	Benjamin Babati	1	0	1
11	(Hungary)	23	Dániel Vadnai	1	0	1
/	/	/	Own Goals	1	0	1
			TOTALS	26	3	29

=== Disciplinary record ===
Includes all competitive matches. Players with 1 card or more included only.

Last updated on 13 March 2022

Position	Nation	Number	Name	OTP Bank Liga		Hungarian Cup		Total (Hu Total)	
Position	Nation	Number	Name	Yellow card	Red card	Yellow card	Red card	Yellow card	Red card
DF	(Croatia)	4	Andrej Lukić	3	0	0	0	3 (3)	0 (0)
DF	(Spain)	5	Héctor Martínez	0	0	1	0	1 (0)	0 (0)
MF	(Hungary)	6	Zoltán Derekas	2	0	0	0	2 (2)	0 (0)
FW	(Romania)	7	Andreias Calcan	1	0	0	0	1 (1)	0 (0)
MF	(Hungary)	8	Benjámin Cseke	5	0	0	0	5 (5)	0 (0)
FW	(Serbia)	9	Stefan Dražić	1	1	0	0	1 (1)	1 (1)
MF	(Bosnia and Herzegovina)	10	Dino Beširović	2	0	0	0	2 (2)	0 (0)
FW	(Hungary)	11	Benjamin Babati	1	0	0	0	1 (1)	0 (0)
FW	(Slovakia)	11	Jakub Vojtuš	3	0	0	0	3 (3)	0 (0)
DF	(Georgia (country))	12	Luka Lakvekheliani	3	0	0	0	3 (3)	0 (0)
MF	(Belarus)	14	Alyaksandr Karnitsky	2	0	0	0	2 (2)	0 (0)
DF	(Slovakia)	17	Róbert Pillár	5	1	0	0	5 (5)	1 (1)
DF	(Czech Republic)	18	Denis Granečný	1	0	0	0	1 (1)	0 (0)
DF	(Slovakia)	19	János Szépe	1	0	0	0	1 (1)	0 (0)
MF	(Hungary)	21	Gergő Kocsis	4	0	0	0	4 (4)	0 (0)
DF	(Serbia)	22	Daniel Farkaš	9	0	0	0	9 (9)	0 (0)
DF	(Hungary)	23	Dániel Vadnai	2	0	0	0	2 (2)	0 (0)
MF	(Hungary)	24	Tamás Cseri	5	0	0	0	5 (5)	0 (0)
DF	(Croatia)	32	Matija Katanec	4	1	0	0	4 (4)	1 (1)
FW	(Bulgaria)	39	Antonio Vutov	3	0	0	0	3 (3)	0 (0)
DF	(Albania)	44	Amir Bilali	3	0	0	0	3 (3)	0 (0)
FW	(Croatia)	50	Tomislav Kiš	1	0	0	0	1 (1)	0 (0)
MF	(Hungary)	55	Dániel Nagy	1	0	1	0	2 (1)	0 (0)
MF	(Albania)	92	Kamer Qaka	2	0	0	0	2 (2)	0 (0)
MF	(Hungary)	95	Márk Madarász	2	0	0	0	2 (2)	0 (0)
FW	(Bosnia and Herzegovina)	99	Marin Jurina	3	0	1	0	4 (3)	0 (0)
			TOTALS	66	3	3	0	69 (66)	3 (3)

=== Clean sheets ===
Last updated on 13 March 2022

Position	Nation	Number	Name	OTP Bank Liga	Hungarian Cup	Total
1	(Romania)	96	Árpád Tordai	3	1	4
2	(Italy)	93	Riccardo Piscitelli	2	0	2
3	(Hungary)	1	Botond Antal	0	1	1
4	(Hungary)	13	Levente Bősz	0	0	0
5	(Hungary)	33	Péter Bazsányi	0	0	0
			TOTALS	5	2	7
