= 2019–20 Újpest FC season =

Újpest FC
2019–20 season
- Chairman: Roland Duchâtelet
- Manager: Nebojša Vignjević
- NB 1: 6th
- Magyar Kupa: Round of 16 vs Fehérvár
- Top goalscorer: League: Róbert Feczesin (8); All: Róbert Feczesin (9)
Home colours	Away colours

The 2019–20 season was Újpest Football Club's 139th competitive season, 128th consecutive season in the OTP Bank Liga, and 127th year in existence as a football club.

== Season events ==
On 25 February, Újpest announced that their home games against Puskás Akadémia and Paks would be played at the ZTE Arena in Zalaegerszeg instead of Újpest's regular Szusza Ferenc Stadion in Budapest.

On 11 March, the Hungarian Football Federation announced that all games would be played behind closed doors due to the COVID-19 pandemic, before announcing that all games had been postponed on 16 March.

== Squad ==
As of 7 February 2020

Note: Flags indicate national team as defined under FIFA eligibility rules; some limited exceptions apply. Players may hold more than one non-FIFA nationality.

No.	Pos.	Nation	Player
1	GK	SRB	Filip Pajović
4	DF	MKD	Kire Ristevski
5	DF	HUN	Róbert Litauszki (captain)
6	MF	NGR	Obinna Nwobodo
7	MF	HUN	Krisztián Simon
8	FW	ISL	Aron Bjarnason
9	FW	HUN	Patrik Bacsa
10	FW	HUN	Donát Zsótér
11	MF	CRO	Antonio Perošević
14	FW	HUN	Áron Csongvai
15	MF	GUI	Moussa Corso Traoré (loan from Vasalund)
17	MF	HUN	Péter Szakály
19	FW	HUN	Márk Koszta

No.	Pos.	Nation	Player
20	FW	ROU	Andreias Calcan
21	DF	HUN	Benjamin Balázs
22	MF	SVK	Jakub Sedláček
23	GK	HUN	Dávid Banai
24	MF	HUN	Barnabás Rácz
27	MF	HUN	Mátyás Katona
28	DF	BEL	Jonathan Heris
30	MF	NGR	Vincent Onovo
34	GK	HUN	Zoltán Tomori
49	DF	SRB	Branko Pauljević
55	DF	HUN	Zsolt Máté
68	DF	BIH	Dženan Bureković
86	FW	HUN	Soma Novothny

== Transfers ==
=== In ===
Date	Position	Nationality	Name	From	Fee	Ref.
11 June 2019	MF	(Slovakia)	Karol Mészáros	Szombathely	Undisclosed	
18 June 2019	DF	(Hungary)	Zsolt Máté	Újpest II	Promoted	
28 June 2019	FW	(Hungary)	Márk Koszta	Mezőkövesd	Undisclosed	
8 July 2019	FW	(Iceland)	Aron Bjarnason	Breiðablik	Undisclosed	
27 August 2019	GK	(Hungary)	Tamás Fadgyas	Nyíregyháza	Undisclosed	
29 August 2019	MF	(Hungary)	Péter Szakály	Puskás Akadémia	Undisclosed	
29 August 2019	FW	(Hungary)	Róbert Feczesin	Adanaspor	Undisclosed	
30 August 2019	DF	(Belgium)	Jonathan Heris	Puskás Akadémia	Undisclosed	
6 September 2019	FW	(Croatia)	Antonio Perošević	Puskás Akadémia	Undisclosed	
22 January 2020	FW	(Hungary)	Patrik Bacsa	Diósgyőri VTK	Undisclosed	
23 January 2020	FW	(Romania)	Andreias Calcan	Viitorul Constanța	Undisclosed	
31 January 2020	MF	(Slovakia)	Jakub Sedláček	Pohronie	Undisclosed	
7 February 2020	GK	(Hungary)	Zoltán Tomori	Budapest Honvéd	Undisclosed	

=== Loans out ===
Date	Position	Nationality	Name	To	Date to	Ref.
Winter 2020	MF	(Guinea)	Moussa Corso Traoré	Vasalund	End of season	

=== Out ===
Date	Position	Nationality	Name	To	Fee	Ref.
28 June 2019	MF	(Hungary)	Dániel Nagy	Mezőkövesd	Undisclosed	
3 July 2019	FW	(Hungary)	Patrik Tischler	Kisvárda	Undisclosed	
5 July 2019	FW	(Nigeria)	Theophilus Solomon	Partizani Tirana	Undisclosed	
15 August 2019	FW	(Ivory Coast)	Lacina Traoré	CFR Cluj	Undisclosed	
29 August 2019	GK	(Hungary)	Bence Gundel-Takács	Fehérvár	Undisclosed	
6 January 2020	GK	(Hungary)	Tamás Fadgyas	Nyíregyháza Spartacus	Undisclosed	
6 January 2020	MF	(Romania)	Lóránt Kovács	Sepsi OSK	Undisclosed	

=== Loans out ===
Date	Position	Nationality	Name	To	Date to	Ref.
14 March 2019	FW	(Hungary)	Soma Novothny	Busan IPark	End of 2019	
Summer 2019	DF	(Hungary)	Kristóf Szűcs	Vác	End of season	
Summer 2019	DF	(Serbia)	Marko Filipović	Vác	End of season	

=== Released ===
Date	Position	Nationality	Name	Joined	Date	Ref.
17 June 2019	DF	(Montenegro)	Mijuško Bojović	Keşla	11 July 2019	
17 June 2019	MF	(Mali)	Alassane Diallo	FC 93		
6 January 2020	MF	(Montenegro)	Bojan Sanković	Irtysh Pavlodar	11 January 2020	
6 January 2020	MF	(Slovakia)	Karol Mészáros	Dynamo České Budějovice		
16 January 2020	MF	(Hungary)	Róbert Feczesin	Vasas SC	16 January 2020	
January 2020	FW	(Democratic Republic of the Congo)	Rosy Lubaki			
29 June 2020	DF	(Belgium)	Jonathan Heris	KAS Eupen	14 July 2020	
29 June 2020	DF	(Hungary)	Benjamin Balázs	MTK Budapest		
29 June 2020	DF	(Hungary)	Róbert Litauszki	Vasas		
29 June 2020	FW	(Hungary)	Soma Novothny	VfL Bochum	7 September 2020	
29 June 2020	FW	(Hungary)	Donát Zsótér	Budapest Honvéd		

== Competitions ==
=== Nemzeti Bajnokság I ===
==== League table ====
Pos	Team	Pld	W	D	L	GF	GA	GD	Pts	Qualification or relegation
4	Mezőkövesd	33	14	8	11	42	31	+11	50	
5	Honvéd	33	12	8	13	36	44	−8	44	Qualification for the Europa League first qualifying round (Note: Budapest Honvéd qualified for the Europa League first qualifying round by winning the 2019–20 Magyar Kupa.)
6	Újpest	33	12	7	14	45	45	0	43	
7	Zalaegerszeg	33	11	10	12	51	44	+7	43	
8	Kisvárda	33	12	6	15	42	43	−1	42	

Source: Hungarian Football Federation (in Hungarian), Soccerway
Rules for classification: 1) Points; 2) Matches won; 3) Goal difference; 4) Goals scored; 5) Head-to-head points; 6) Head-to-head goal difference; 7) Head-to-head away goals scored; 8) Fair play ranking; 9) Drawing of lots.

==== Results summary ====
Overall								Home						Away					
Pld	W	D	L	GF	GA	GD	Pts	W	D	L	GF	GA	GD	W	D	L	GF	GA	GD
33	12	7	14	45	45	0	43	6	4	7	24	22	+2	6	3	7	21	23	−2

Last updated: 27 June 2020.
Source: NB1

==== Results by round ====
Round	1	2	3	4	5	6	7	8	9	10	11	12	13	14	15	16	17	18	19	20	21	22	23	24	25	26	27	28	29	30	31	32	33
Ground	H	A	H	A	H	H	A	H	A	H	A	A	H	A	H	A	A	H	A	A	A	H	A	H	H	A	H	H	A	H	A	H	H
Result	L	W	D	L	L	W	W	L	L	D	W	W	L	W	W	D	L	L	D	L	W	L	L	D	L	L	W	W	D	D	L	W	W
Position	12	7	6	7	9	7	5	5	7	8	7	6	6	6	5	5	6	7	7	8	8	7	8	9	9	10	9	8	7	8	9	8	6

Updated to match(es) played on 27 June 2020. Source: Results
A = Away; H = Home; W = Win; D = Draw; L = Loss

==== Results ====
3 August 2019 1	Újpest	1 – 3	Puskás Akadémia	Budapest
19:30 CEST	Zsótér (yellow card) 26'; Balázs 52'	Report	Henty 13', 31'; Hadzhiev (yellow card) 46'; Nagy (yellow card) 53'; Knežević 69'; Kiss (yellow card) 90+2'	Stadium: Illovszky Rudolf Stadion; Attendance: 2,707; Referee: István Vad

10 August 2019 2	Diósgyőr	1 – 2	Újpest	Miskolc
19:30 CEST	Tajti 38'; Karan (yellow card) 48'	Report	Zsótér 14'; Nwobodo 48'; Litauszki (yellow card) 57'; Sanković (yellow card) 62'; Kovács (yellow card) 88'	Stadium: Diósgyőri Stadion; Attendance: 6,518; Referee: Ádám Farkas

17 August 2019 3	Újpest	1 – 1	Paks	Budapest
19:30 CEST	Balázs (yellow card) 45'; Sanković 69'	Report	Papp (yellow card) 29'; Könyves 57'; Kővári (yellow card) 90+3'	Stadium: Illovszky Rudolf Stadion; Attendance: 2,349; Referee: Péter Solymosi

24 August 2019 4	Kisvárda	2 – 0	Újpest	Kisvárda
18:00 CEST	Grozav 23', 74'; Lucas (yellow card) 70'	Report	Bureković (yellow card) 37'	Stadium: Várkerti Stadion; Attendance: 2,128; Referee: Gergő Bogár

31 August 2019 5	Újpest	2 – 3	Budapest Honvéd	Budapest
19:30 CEST	Feczesin 4' (yellow card) 90+2'; Szakály (yellow card) 86'; Lanzafame 90+1' (o.g.)	Report	Uzoma 10'; Ikenne (yellow card) 19'; Moutari 27'; Gazdag 31'; Batik (yellow card) 71'; Kukoč (yellow card) 84'	Stadium: Szusza Ferenc Stadion; Attendance: 3,752; Referee: Zoltán Iványi

14 September 2019 6	Újpest	3 – 2	Debrecen	Budapest
17:00 CEST	Koszta 75'; Feczesin (yellow card) 56' (goal) 87', 90+4' (pen.); Bjarnason (yellow card) 68'; Ristevski (yellow card) 76'; Heris (yellow card) 80'	Report	Garba 22' (yellow card) 51'; Adeniji 85'; Ferenczi (yellow card) 90+2'	Stadium: Illovszky Rudolf Stadion; Attendance: 2,548; Referee: József Erdős

28 September 2019 7	Fehérvár	0 – 2	Újpest	Székesfehérvár
19:30 CEST	Huszti (yellow card) 63'; Pátkai (yellow card) 66'; Stopira (yellow card) 89'	Report	Sanković (yellow card) 48'; Ristevski (yellow card) 63'; Onovo 81'; Feczesin 90+2'	Stadium: MOL Aréna Sóstó; Attendance: 5,267; Referee: Csaba Pintér

5 October 2019 8	Újpest	1 – 2	Mezőkövesd	Budapest
14:30 CEST	Heris (yellow card) 32'; Koszta 90+3'	Report	Katanec (yellow card) 40'; Berecz 43'; Nagy (yellow card) 58'; Silye 89'	Stadium: Illovszky Rudolf Stadion; Attendance: 2,248; Referee: Balázs Berke

19 October 2019 9	Ferencváros	1 – 0	Újpest	Budapest
19:30 CEST	Boli 23'; Botka (yellow card) 53'	Report	Nwobodo (yellow card) 18'; Onovo (yellow card) 27'	Stadium: Groupama Arena; Attendance: 18,759; Referee: Tamás Bognár

26 October 2019 10	Újpest	0 – 0	Zalaegerszeg	Budapest
17:00 CEST		Report	Stieber (yellow card) 75'; Mitrović (yellow card) 90+1'	Stadium: Illovszky Rudolf Stadion; Attendance: 2,619; Referee: Ferenc Karakó

2 November 2019 11	Kaposvár	2 – 3	Újpest	Kaposvár
17:00 CET	Balázs 5'; Ádám 52'	Report	Zsótér 27'; Nwobodo (yellow card) 34' (goal) 49'; Simon 44'; Pauljević (yellow card) 57'	Stadium: Rákóczi Stadion; Attendance: 2,072; Referee: Ádám Pillók

9 November 2019 12	Puskás Akadémia	1 – 3	Újpest	Felcsút
17:00 CET	Meißner (yellow card) 14'; Henty 34'; Nagy (yellow card) 90'	Report	Onovo 31'; Feczesin 45', 81'; Bureković (yellow card) 76'	Stadium: Pancho Aréna; Attendance: 1,725; Referee: Gergő Bogár

23 November 2019 13	Újpest	0 – 2	Diósgyőri	Budapest
19:30 CET	Pauljević (yellow card) 20'	Report	Márkvárt 24'; Vági (yellow card) 30'; Tabaković 33'	Stadium: Illovszky Rudolf Stadion; Attendance: 2,496; Referee: Sandor Ando-Szabo

30 November 2019 14	Paks	2 – 4	Újpest	Paks
17:00 CET	Szabó (yellow card) 41'; Könyves (yellow card) 45'; Hahn 62'; Bor 84'	Report	Feczesin 21', 51'; Zsótér 61'; Heris (yellow card) 68'; Pauljević 76'; Simon (yellow card) 80'	Stadium: Fehérvári úti Stadion; Attendance: 1,315; Referee: Ferenc Karakó

7 December 2019 15	Újpest	1 – 0	Kisvárda	Budapest
17:00 CET	Kravchenko 34' (o.g.); Pauljević (yellow card) 51'; Zsótér (yellow card) 70'; Nwobodo (yellow card) 80'	Report	Hugo Seco (yellow card) 54'	Stadium: Illovszky Rudolf Stadion; Attendance: 1,446; Referee: Tamás Bognár

14 December 2019 16	Budapest Honvéd	0 – 0	Újpest	Budapest
19:30 CET	Banó-Szabó (yellow card) 90+3'	Report	Nwobodo (yellow card) 44'; Bureković (yellow card) 46'	Stadium: Hidegkuti Nándor Stadion; Attendance: 2,937; Referee: Péter Solymosi

24 January 2020 17	Debrecen	4 – 0	Újpest	Debrecen
19:00 CET	Kusnyír (yellow card) 34'; Szécsi 48', 53' (yellow card) 51'; Bódi 69' (pen.); Adeniji 73'; Csősz (yellow card) 90+1'	Report	Szakály (yellow card) 7'; Bureković (yellow card) 34'; Bacsa (red card) 67'	Stadium: Nagyerdei Stadion; Attendance: 2,120; Referee: Adam Farkas

1 February 2020 18	Újpest	0 – 1	Fehérvár	Budapest
19:30 CET	Heris (yellow card) 51'; Nwobodo (yellow card) 67'	Report	Fiola (yellow card) 79'; Petryak 84'	Stadium: Szusza Ferenc Stadion; Attendance: 1,125; Referee: Csaba Pinter

4 February 2020 19	Mezőkövesdi	2 – 2	Újpest	Mezőkövesd
20:00 CET	Jurina 54'; Vadnai (yellow card) 62'; Beširović 88' (yellow card) 89'	Report	Berecz 14' (o.g.); Onovo (yellow card) 37'; Novothny 58'; Csongvai (yellow card) 59'; Banai (yellow card) 66'; Bureković (yellow card) 90+2'	Stadium: Mezőkövesdi Városi Stadion; Attendance: 1,582; Referee: Adam Pillók

8 February 2020 20	Újpest	–	Ferencváros	Budapest
19:30 CET				Stadium: Szusza Ferenc Stadion
Note: Match postponed on 6 February 2020.

15 February 2020 21	Zalaegerszeg	2 – 1	Újpest	Zalaegerszeg
17:00 CET	Radó 28', 72'	Report	Calcan 17'; Litauszki (yellow card) 44'; Nwobodo (yellow card) 60'; Pauljević (yellow card) 80'; Bacsa (yellow card) 87'; Heris (yellow card) 90'	Stadium: ZTE Arena; Attendance: 3,089; Referee: Zoltan Ivanyi

22 February 2020 22	Kaposvár	0 – 1	Újpest	Kaposvár
17:00 CET	J.Nagy (yellow card) 62'; Vachtler (yellow card) 87'; T.Nagy (yellow card) 90'	Report	Novothny 6' (pen.); Ristevski (yellow card) 56'	Stadium: Rákóczi Stadion; Attendance: 1,096; Referee: Jozsef Erdos

29 February 2020 23	Újpest	2 – 3	Puskás Akadémia	Zalaegerszeg
17:00 CET	Calcan 27'; Nwobodo (yellow card) 33'; Litauszki (yellow card) 69'; Novothny 90+1'	Report	Vaněček 3'; Urblík (yellow card) 31'; Knežević (yellow card) 36' (goal) 42' van Nieff 87'	Stadium: ZTE Arena; Attendance: 182; Referee: Péter Solymosi
Note: Match held at the ZTE Arena in Zalaegerszeg instead of Újpest's regular Szusza Ferenc Stadion in Budapest.

7 March 2020 24	Diósgyőr	2 – 1	Újpest	Miskolc
17:00 CET	Ivanovski 7'; Rui Pedro 59'	Report	Onovo (yellow card) 58'; Novothny (yellow card) 78' (goal) 90+2'; Balázs (red card) 88'; Csongvai (yellow card) 89'	Stadium: DVTK Stadion; Attendance: 8,376; Referee: József Erdős

14 March 2020 25	Újpest	1 – 1	Paks	Zalaegerszeg
17:00 CET	Litauszki 57'; Onovo (yellow card) 90+7'	Report	Könyves 90+4'; Gévay (yellow card) 90+5'	Stadium: ZTE Arena; Attendance: 0 Referee: Ádám Pillók
Note: Match held at the ZTE Arena in Zalaegerszeg instead of Újpest's regular Szusza Ferenc Stadion in Budapest. Match behind closed doors due to the COVID-19 pandemic.

27 May 2020 20	Újpest	0 – 1	Ferencváros	Budapest
20:00 CEST	Bureković (yellow card) 32' (yellow-red card) 90+2'	Report	Boli 7' (yellow card) 82'; Zubkov (yellow card) 71'	Stadium: Szusza Ferenc Stadion; Attendance: 0 Referee: Balázs Berke
Note: Match originally scheduled for 8 February, and the 21 April, but postponed due to the COVID-19 pandemic. Match played without fans.

30 May 2020 26	Kisvárda	1 – 0	Újpest	Kisvárda
16:55 CEST	Bumba (yellow card) 34' (goal) 63'; Viana (yellow card) 45+2'; Protić (yellow card) 89'; Melnyk (yellow card) 90+3'	Report	Onovo (yellow card) 34'; Heris (yellow card) 45+3'; Calcan (red card) 55'; Ristevski (yellow card) 90+1'	Stadium: Várkerti Stadion; Attendance: 820; Referee: Tamas Bognár
Note: Match originally scheduled for 21 March, but postponed due to the COVID-19 pandemic,

6 June 2020 27	Újpest	1 – 0	Budapest Honvéd	Budapest
21:05 CEST	Szakály (yellow card) 27'; Novothny 45+1'	Report		Stadium: Szusza Ferenc Stadion; Attendance: 1,900; Referee: Adam Pillók
Note: Match originally scheduled for 3 April, but postponed due to the COVID-19 pandemic,

9 June 2020 28	Újpest	3 – 1	Debrecen	Budapest
19:00 CEST	Ristevski 10'; Simon 48', 62'; Perošević (yellow card) 81'	Report	Heris 59' (o.g.); Habovda (yellow card) 77'; Tőzsér (yellow card) 90+4'	Stadium: Szusza Ferenc Stadion; Attendance: 2,500; Referee: Balázs Berke
Note: Match originally scheduled for 10 April, but postponed due to the COVID-19 pandemic,

14 June 2020 29	Fehérvár	2 – 2	Újpest	Székesfehérvár
21:05 CEST	Ristevski 41' (o.g.); Juhász (yellow card) 44'; Nikolić 72'; Fiola (yellow card) 83'	Report	Pauljević (yellow card) 28'; Perošević (yellow card) 37'; Nwobodo 64'; Ristevski (yellow card) 73'; Heris 81'	Stadium: MOL Aréna Sóstó; Referee: Péter Solymosi
Note: Match originally scheduled for 17 April, but postponed due to the COVID-19 pandemic,

17 June 2020 30	Újpest	1 – 1	Mezőkövesd	Budapest
21:05 CEST	Perošević (yellow card) 78'; Koszta 90+5'	Report	Nagy (yellow card) 6'; Pekár 66'; Eperjesi (yellow card) 90+3'	Stadium: Szusza Ferenc Stadion; Referee: Csaba Pinter
Note: Match originally scheduled for 24 April, but postponed due to the COVID-19 pandemic,

20 June 2020 31	Ferencváros	1 – 0	Újpest	Budapest
21:05 CEST	Kharatin (yellow card) 10'; Blažič (yellow card) 28'; Isael (yellow card) 47'; Boli 53'	Report	Novothny (yellow card) 16'; Zsótér (yellow card) 68'; Ristevski (yellow card) 90'; Katona (yellow card) 90'	Stadium: Groupama Arena; Referee: Gergő Bogár

23 June 2020 32	Újpest	2 – 1	Zalaegerszeg	Budapest
21:05 CEST	Simon 37'; Novothny (yellow card) 88'; Ristevski 90+4'	Report	Kocsis (yellow card) 44'; McWoods 83'	Stadium: Szusza Ferenc Stadion; Referee: István Vad

27 June 2020 33	Újpest	5 – 0	Kaposvár	Budapest
17:30 CEST	Simon 12'; Novothny 45'; Bacsa 45+1', 49'; Máté 57'	Report	Balázs (yellow card) 2'	Stadium: Szusza Ferenc Stadion; Referee: Bence Csonka

=== Magyar Kupa ===
21 September 2019 6th Round	Hatvan	0 – 2	Újpest	Hatvan
15:00 CEST		Report	Onovo 29'; Nwobodo 55'	Stadium: Népkert Sporttelep; Referee: Tamás Móri

29 October 2019 7th Round	Ajka	2 – 5	Újpest	Ajka
18:30 CET	Nagy 31'; Lengyel 46'	Report	Szakály 41'; Heris 53'; Feczesin 60'; Bjarnason 64', 75'	Stadium: Városi Stadion; Referee: Bence Csonka

11 December 2019 Round of 32	Vác	0 – 3	Újpest	Vác
12:00 CET	E.Szenecei (yellow card) 15'; B.Lefler (yellow card) 20'	Report	Koszta 6'; Á.Csongvai (yellow card) 34' (goal) 63'; Perošević 51'	Stadium: Ligeti Stadion; Referee: RÚSZ MÁRTON

11 February 2020 Round of 16 1st leg	Újpest	0 – 0	Fehérvár	Szeged
19:30 CET		Report	Petryak (yellow card) 31'; Nyári (yellow card) 78'	Stadium: Szent Gellért Fórum; Attendance: 1,551; Referee: Ferenc Karakó
Note: Match played at Szent Gellért Fórum in Szeged instead of Újpest's regular Szusza Ferenc Stadion in Budapest due to pitch not passing the MLSZ standards.

19 February 2020 Round of 16 2nd leg	Fehérvár	1 – 0 (1 – 0 agg.)	Újpest	Székesfehérvár
17:30 CET	Bamgboye (yellow card) 70'; Musliu 89'	Report	Onovo (yellow card) 65'	Stadium: MOL Aréna Sóstó; Attendance: 1,794; Referee: Istvan Vad

== Squad statistics ==
As of match played 27 June 2020

=== Appearances and goals ===
No.	Pos	Nat	Player	Total		NB I		Magyar Kupa	
No.	Pos	Nat	Player	Apps	Goals	Apps	Goals	Apps	Goals
1	GK	(Serbia) SRB	Filip Pajović	13	0	10	0	3	0
4	DF	(North Macedonia) MKD	Kire Ristevski	32	2	29	2	3	0
5	DF	(Hungary) HUN	Róbert Litauszki	14	1	11	1	3	0
6	MF	(Nigeria) NGR	Obinna Nwobodo	37	4	32	3	4+1	1
7	MF	(Hungary) HUN	Krisztián Simon	33	5	24+5	5	4	0
8	FW	(Iceland) ISL	Aron Bjarnason	18	2	5+11	0	1+1	2
9	FW	(Hungary) HUN	Patrik Bacsa	14	2	2+12	2	0	0
10	FW	(Hungary) HUN	Donát Zsótér	31	3	21+6	3	2+2	0
11	FW	(Croatia) CRO	Antonio Perošević	19	1	10+6	0	1+2	1
14	FW	(Hungary) HUN	Áron Csongvai	13	1	4+6	0	1+2	1
17	MF	(Hungary) HUN	Péter Szakály	25	1	14+6	0	4+1	1
19	FW	(Hungary) HUN	Márk Koszta	21	4	2+16	3	2+1	1
20	FW	(Romania) ROU	Andreias Calcan	11	2	6+3	2	1+1	0
21	MF	(Hungary) HUN	Benjamin Balázs	26	1	17+6	1	3	0
22	MF	(Slovakia) SVK	Jakub Sedláček	2	0	2	0	0	0
23	GK	(Hungary) HUN	Dávid Banai	25	0	23	0	2	0
24	MF	(Hungary) HUN	Barnabás Rácz	9	0	7+2	0	0	0
27	MF	(Hungary) HUN	Mátyás Katona	2	0	0+2	0	0	0
28	DF	(Belgium) BEL	Jonathan Heris	30	2	25+1	1	4	1
30	MF	(Nigeria) NGR	Vincent Onovo	37	3	29+3	2	4+1	1
49	DF	(Serbia) SRB	Branko Pauljević	30	1	26	1	2+2	0
55	DF	(Hungary) HUN	Zsolt Máté	3	1	3	1	0	0
68	DF	(Bosnia and Herzegovina) BIH	Dženan Bureković	32	0	25+2	0	5	0
86	FW	(Hungary) HUN	Soma Novothny	19	6	16+1	6	2	0
Players away on loan :
Players who left Újpest during the season:
9	FW	(Hungary) HUN	Róbert Feczesin	14	9	12	8	1+1	1
18	MF	(Montenegro) MNE	Bojan Sanković	18	1	16	1	2	0
27	MF	(Romania) ROU	Lóránt Kovács	3	0	1+2	0	0	0
70	MF	(Slovakia) SVK	Karol Mészáros	4	0	0+3	0	1	0

=== Goal scorers ===
Place	Position	Nation	Number	Name	NB I	Magyar Kupa	Total	
1	MF	(Hungary)	9	Róbert Feczesin	8	1	9	
2	FW	(Hungary)	86	Soma Novothny	6	0	6	
	MF	(Hungary)	7	Krisztián Simon	5	0	5	
4	MF	(Nigeria)	6	Obinna Nwobodo	3	1	4	
4	FW	(Hungary)	19	Márk Koszta	3	1	4	
4	6	MF	(Hungary)	10	Donát Zsótér	3	0	3
MF	6	(Nigeria)	30	Vincent Onovo	2	1	3	
	6		Own goal	3	0	3		
9	FW	(Romania)	20	Andreias Calcan	2	0	2	
9	DF	(North Macedonia)	4	Kire Ristevski	2	0	2	
9	FW	(Hungary)	9	Patrik Bacsa	2	0	2	
9	DF	(Belgium)	28	Jonathan Heris	1	1	2	
9	FW	(Iceland)	8	Aron Bjarnason	0	2	2	
14	MF	(Hungary)	21	Benjamin Balázs	1	0	1	
14	MF	(Montenegro)	18	Bojan Sanković	1	0	1	
14	DF	(Hungary)	5	Róbert Litauszki	1	0	1	
14	MF	(Serbia)	49	Branko Pauljević	1	0	1	
14	DF	(Hungary)	55	Zsolt Máté	1	0	1	
14	MF	(Hungary)	17	Péter Szakály	0	1	1	
14	FW	(Croatia)	11	Antonio Perošević	0	1	1	
14	FW	(Hungary)	14	Áron Csongvai	0	1	1	
				TOTALS	45	10	55	

=== Clean sheets ===
Place	Position	Nation	Number	Name	NB I	Magyar Kupa	Total
1	GK	(Hungary)	23	Dávid Banai	6	2	8
2	GK	(Serbia)	1	Filip Pajović	1	1	2
				TOTALS	7	3	10

=== Disciplinary record ===
Number	Nation	Position	Name	NB I		Magyar Kupa		Total	
Number	Nation	Position	Name	Yellow card	Red card	Yellow card	Red card	Yellow card	Red card
4	(North Macedonia)	DF	Kire Ristevski	6	0	0	0	6	0
5	(Hungary)	DF	Róbert Litauszki	3	0	0	0	3	0
6	(Nigeria)	MF	Obinna Nwobodo	7	0	0	0	7	0
7	(Hungary)	MF	Krisztián Simon	1	0	0	0	1	0
8	(Iceland)	FW	Aron Bjarnason	1	0	0	0	1	0
9	(Hungary)	FW	Patrik Bacsa	1	1	0	0	1	1
10	(Hungary)	FW	Donát Zsótér	3	0	1	0	4	0
11	(Croatia)	FW	Antonio Perošević	3	0	0	0	3	0
14	(Hungary)	FW	Áron Csongvai	2	0	1	0	3	0
17	(Hungary)	MF	Péter Szakály	3	0	0	0	3	0
20	(Romania)	FW	Andreias Calcan	0	1	0	0	0	1
21	(Hungary)	MF	Benjamin Balázs	1	1	0	0	1	1
23	(Hungary)	GK	Dávid Banai	1	0	0	0	1	0
27	(Hungary)	MF	Mátyás Katona	1	0	0	0	1	0
28	(Belgium)	DF	Jonathan Heris	6	0	0	0	6	0
30	(Nigeria)	MF	Vincent Onovo	4	0	1	0	5	0
49	(Serbia)	DF	Branko Pauljević	5	0	0	0	5	0
68	(Bosnia and Herzegovina)	DF	Dženan Bureković	7	1	1	0	8	1
86	(Hungary)	FW	Soma Novothny	3	0	0	0	3	0
Players who left Újpest during the season:
9	(Hungary)	FW	Róbert Feczesin	2	0	0	0	2	0
18	(Montenegro)	MF	Bojan Sanković	2	0	0	0	2	0
27	(Romania)	MF	Lóránt Kovács	1	0	0	0	1	0
			TOTALS	63	4	4	0	67	4
