= Benjamin Babati =

Hungarian professional footballer

Personal information
- Date of birth: 29 November 1995 (age 30)
- Place of birth: Zalaegerszeg, Hungary
- Height: 1.76 m (5 ft 9 in)
- Position: Right winger

Youth career
- 2006–2012: Zalaegerszeg

Senior career*
Years	Team	Apps	(Gls)
2012–2022	Zalaegerszeg	249	(59)
2022–2023	Mezőkövesd	13	(1)
2022–2023	→ Győr (loan)	19	(3)
2023–2025	FK Csíkszereda	52	(7)
- * Club domestic league appearances and goals as of 23 August 2025

Benjamin Babati (born 29 November 1995) is a Hungarian professional footballer who plays as a right winger.

== Club career ==
On 5 January 2022, Babati signed a 2.5-year contract with Mezőkövesd. On 16 July 2022, he was loaned to Győr.

In August 2023, Babati signed for Romanian Liga II club FK Csíkszereda on an initial one-year deal with the option for a further year.

== International career ==
In September 2020, Babati was called up to the Hungary national football team for Nations League games against Turkey and Russia, but remained on the bench in both games.

== Personal life ==
Benjamin Babati is the son of former Hungarian professional football player Ferenc Babati.

== Career statistics ==
As of match played 23 August 2025

Appearances and goals by club, season and competition
Club	Season	League			National cup (Note: Includes Magyar Kupa, Cupa României)		League cup (Note: Includes Ligakupa)		Other		Total	
Club	Season	Division	Apps	Goals	Apps	Goals	Apps	Goals	Apps	Goals	Apps	Goals
Zalaegerszeg	2012–13	Nemzeti Bajnokság II	13	1	2	0	3	1	—		18	2
Zalaegerszeg	2013–14	Nemzeti Bajnokság II	26	2	2	0	2	0	—		30	2
Zalaegerszeg	2014–15	Nemzeti Bajnokság II	28	8	2	1	5	0	—		35	9
Zalaegerszeg	2015–16	Nemzeti Bajnokság II	25	5	2	0	—		—		27	5
Zalaegerszeg	2016–17	Nemzeti Bajnokság II	34	9	3	0	—		—		37	9
Zalaegerszeg	2017–18	Nemzeti Bajnokság II	35	11	4	1	—		—		39	12
Zalaegerszeg	2018–19	Nemzeti Bajnokság II	28	15	1	0	—		—		29	15
Zalaegerszeg	2019–20	Nemzeti Bajnokság I	21	3	6	1	—		—		27	4
Zalaegerszeg	2020–21	Nemzeti Bajnokság I	27	4	4	1	—		—		31	5
Zalaegerszeg	2021–22	Nemzeti Bajnokság I	12	1	1	0	—		—		13	1
Zalaegerszeg	Total		249	59	27	4	10	1	0	0	286	64
Mezőkövesd	2021–22	Nemzeti Bajnokság I	13	1	—		—		—		13	1
Győr (loan)	2022–23	Nemzeti Bajnokság II	19	3	1	0	—		—		20	3
FK Csíkszereda	2023–24	Liga II	18	1	1	0	—		2 (Note: Appearances in Liga I promotion/relegation play-offs)	0	21	1
FK Csíkszereda	2024–25	Liga II	28	6	3	1	—		—		31	7
FK Csíkszereda	2025–26	Liga I	6	0	0	0	—		—		6	0
FK Csíkszereda	Total		52	7	4	1	—		2	0	58	8
Career total			332	70	32	5	10	1	2	0	376	76

== Honours ==
Zalaegerszeg

- Nemzeti Bajnokság II: 2018–19
