= Preslav Borukov =

Bulgarian footballer (born 2000)

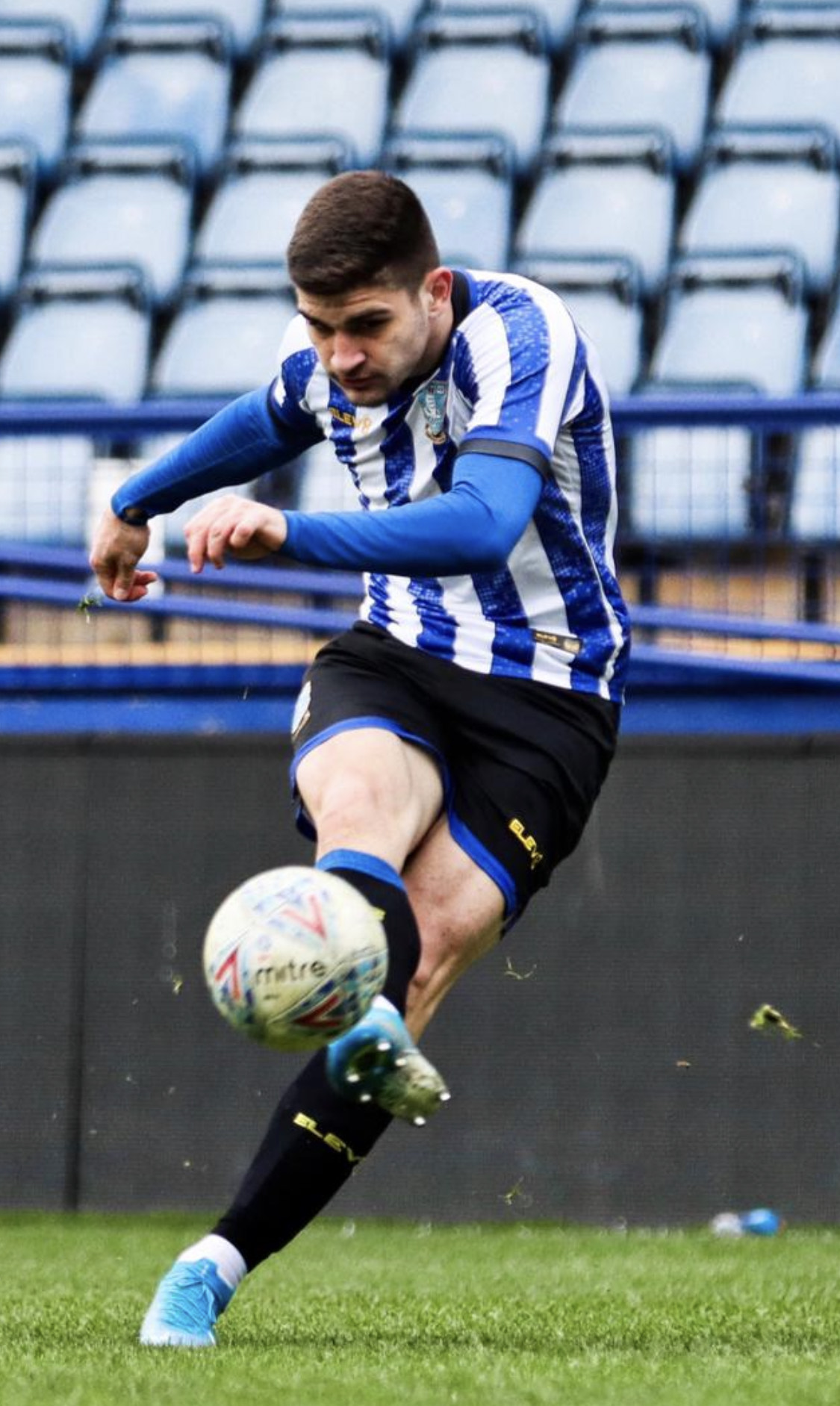

Personal information
- Full name: Preslav Nikolaev Borukov
- Date of birth: 23 April 2000 (age 26)
- Place of birth: Sofia, Bulgaria
- Height: 1.89 m (6 ft 2 1/2 in)
- Position: Forward

Team information
- Current team: Botev Vratsa
- Number: 99

Youth career
- 2006–2016: Levski Sofia
- 2016–2020: Sheffield Wednesday

Senior career*
| Years | Team | Apps | (Gls) |
| 2018–2020 | Sheffield Wednesday | 0 | (0) |
| 2020–2021 | Etar | 30 | (12) |
| 2021 | Zalaegerszeg | 3 | (1) |
| 2022 | Lokomotiv Plovdiv | 30 | (4) |
| 2023–2024 | Arda Kardzhali | 37 | (11) |
| 2024–2026 | Marítimo | 33 | (2) |
| 2026– | Botev Vratsa | 9 | (2) |

International career^{‡}
| 2016–2017 | Bulgaria U17 | 3 | (0) |
| 2018–2019 | Bulgaria U19 | 3 | (3) |
| 2019–2021 | Bulgaria U21 | 3 | (0) |
| 2023 | Bulgaria | 4 | (1) |
- * Club domestic league appearances and goals as of 15:55, 6 October 2026 (UTC) ‡ National team caps and goals as of 17:33, 19 November 2023 (UTC)

Preslav Nikolaev Borukov (Bulgarian: Преслав Николаев Боруков; born 23 April 2000) is a Bulgarian professional footballer who plays as a forward for First League club Botev Vratsa.

== Career ==
=== Sheffield Wednesday ===
Borukov started his football career at Levski Sofia at the age of 6. He would go through the academy from the U6 to the U19 during the period from 2006 to 2016. In June 2016, he transferred to the English club Sheffield Wednesday. In the first 2 seasons, he played for the youth teams managed by the coaches Danny Cadamarteri, Ben Wilkinson and Neil Thompson.

On 25 June 2018, Borukov signed his first professional contract with the first team, which made him the first Bulgarian football player for the club and the youngest Bulgarian who penned a professional contract in England. In the next 2 years he was a main player for the Sheffield Wednesday reserves and would train with the first-team squad. In this period he worked with coaches like Carlos Carvalhal, Jos Luhukay, Steve Bruce and Garry Monk. In January 2020, he was part of the first-team squad in the Championship and the FA Cup.

=== Etar Veliko Tarnovo ===
After his contract expired in June 2020, Borukov returned to Bulgaria to sign a one-year contract with Etar. Borukov quickly became the leading player of the Boyars, scoring the club's first goal of the season against his former side Levski Sofia in a 2–1 defeat. By the end of 2020, he scored 6 goals, provided 1 assist and won 1 penalty, with which he participated directly in 8 of the 11 goals for Etar in total until the end of 2020.

He has been selected twice as a Player of the Match, 1 time as a Player of the Round and has been included several times in the Team of the Round and in the Top 5 Forwards of the Round in efbet League. At the "Footballer of the Year" ceremony for 2020 in Bulgaria, he was ranked on the 5th place for the best progressing player by the vote of the journalists. According to the world's most prestigious football statistics organization, InStat, Borukov is placed 6th in terms of effectiveness among all U21 forwards in Europe.

During the winter transfer window, he was close to sign for Slovan Liberec, but the move fell apart.

=== Zalaegerszeg ===
In August 2021, Borukov signed a contract with the Hungarian NB I club Zalaegerszeg for 1+2 years option for the club. Borukov made his debut against Újpest FC in the 75th minute where he provided an assist. He scored his debut goal for the club in the next league match against Paksi FC.

=== Marítimo ===
On 23 January 2024, Borukov joined Liga Portugal 2 club Marítimo on a two-and-a-half-year deal, for a reported fee of €200.000, with Arda Kardzhali keeping a 10% sell-on clause.

=== Botev Vratsa ===
In June 2026, he returned to Bulgaria, signing a contract with Botev Vratsa.

== International career ==
Borukov is part of all youth teams of the national team of Bulgaria. In 2018 he was captain of the youth national team of Bulgaria under 19 years. The qualifications for the European Under-19 Championship were held in the city of Sliven, where Bulgaria was in a group with Romania, Greece and Gibraltar. Borukov scored a hat-trick in the 5–0 victory over Gibraltar, but Bulgaria remained in "3rd" position and dropped out of the European Under-19 Championship in Armenia. On 7 September 2023, he earned his first cap for the senior national team, playing as a starter in the 0:1 loss against Iran in a friendly match. He netted his first goal in the next game, scoring an equalizer in the 1:2 loss against Montenegro.

=== International goal ===
Scores and results list Bulgaria's goal tally first.

| No. | Date | Venue | Opponent | Score | Result | Competition |
|---|---|---|---|---|---|---|
| 1 | 10 September 2023 | Podgorica City Stadium, Podgorica, Montenegro | Montenegro | 1–1 | 1–2 | UEFA Euro 2024 qualification |

== Career statistics ==
=== Club ===
As of 12 May 2024

| Club performance | | | League | | Cup | | Continental | | Other | | Total | |
| Club | League | Season | Apps | Goals | Apps | Goals | Apps | Goals | Apps | Goals | Apps | Goals |
|---|---|---|---|---|---|---|---|---|---|---|---|---|
| Etar | First League | 2020–21 | 30 | 12 | 2 | 0 | – | | – | | 32 | 12 |
| Zalaegerszegi | NB I | 2021–22 | 3 | 1 | 1 | 1 | – | | – | | 4 | 2 |
| PFC Lokomotiv Plovdiv | First League | 2021–22 | 12 | 1 | 1 | 0 | – | | – | | 13 | 1 |
| PFC Lokomotiv Plovdiv | First League | 2022–23 | 18 | 3 | 2 | 0 | – | | – | | 20 | 3 |
| PFC Lokomotiv Plovdiv | Total | | 30 | 4 | 3 | 0 | 0 | 0 | 0 | 0 | 33 | 4 |
| Arda Kardzhali | First League | 2022–23 | 17 | 5 | 1 | 0 | – | | 1 | 0 | 19 | 5 |
| Arda Kardzhali | First League | 2023–24 | 20 | 6 | 1 | 0 | – | | – | | 21 | 6 |
| Arda Kardzhali | Total | | 37 | 11 | 2 | 0 | 0 | 0 | 1 | 0 | 40 | 11 |
| Marítimo | Liga Portugal 2 | 2023–24 | 15 | 2 | 0 | 0 | – | | – | | 15 | 2 |
| Marítimo | Liga Portugal 2 | 2024–25 | 0 | 0 | 0 | 0 | – | | – | | 0 | 0 |
| Marítimo | Total | | 15 | 2 | 0 | 0 | 0 | 0 | 0 | 0 | 15 | 2 |
| Career total | | | 115 | 30 | 7 | 1 | 0 | 1 | 0 | 0 | 124 | 30 |
