= Héctor Martínez (footballer, born 1995) =

Spanish footballer

Personal information
- Full name: Héctor Martínez Torres
- Date of birth: 1 January 1995 (age 31)
- Place of birth: Alcalá de Henares, Spain
- Height: 1.82 m (6 ft 0 in)
- Position: Centre back

Team information
- Current team: Alcalá
- Number: 4

Youth career
- 2003–2005: Alcalá
- 2005–2009: Real Madrid
- 2009–2011: Rayo Vallecano
- 2011–2014: Real Madrid

Senior career*
| Years | Team | Apps | (Gls) |
| 2014–2015 | Real Madrid C | 6 | (0) |
| 2015–2017 | Real Madrid B | 19 | (0) |
| 2016–2017 | → Guijuelo (loan) | 23 | (0) |
| 2017–2020 | Granada B | 76 | (3) |
| 2020–2021 | AEK Larnaca | 6 | (0) |
| 2021–2022 | Mezőkövesdi | 2 | (0) |
| 2022 | Real Murcia | 2 | (0) |
| 2022–2023 | El Ejido | 21 | (1) |
| 2024 | Navalcarnero | 14 | (0) |
| 2024–2025 | SS Reyes | 24 | (1) |
| 2025– | Alcalá | 2 | (0) |
- * Club domestic league appearances and goals as of 28 September 2025

Héctor Martínez Torres (born 1 January 1995) is a Spanish professional footballer who plays as a central defender for Segunda Federación club Alcalá.

== Club career ==
Born in Alcalá de Henares, Community of Madrid, Martínez joined Real Madrid's La Fábrica in 2005 from hometown club RSD Alcalá. He left for Rayo Vallecano four years later, but returned to Real to finish his development.

Martínez made his senior debut with the C team on 17 April 2014 at the age of 18, starting in a 4–1 Segunda División B home win against UB Conquense. In 2015, after they were dissolved, he was promoted to the reserves also in the third division.

On 1 September 2016, Martínez signed with fellow third-tier side CD Guijuelo on loan for the season. In July of the following year, he agreed to a contract with Granada CF and was assigned to the B team in the same league.

On 10 July 2018, Martínez signed a new two-year contract with the Andalusians. He became a free agent on 23 July 2020, having made no competitive appearances for the main squad.

Martínez moved abroad for the first time in his career on 14 September 2020, joining several compatriots at AEK Larnaca FC of the Cypriot First Division on a two-year deal. He played his first match in top-flight football six days later, coming on as a second-half substitute for Tom Hateley in a 2–1 away loss to AC Omonia.

On 5 August 2021, Martínez was announced at Mezőkövesdi.

After leaving Mezőkövesdi, Martínez was announced at Real Murcia on 28 January 2022.
