= Martin Majnovics =

Hungarian association football player

Personal information
- Date of birth: 26 October 2000 (age 26)
- Place of birth: Sopron, Hungary
- Height: 1.79 m (5 ft 10 in)
- Position: Defender

Team information
- Current team: Pécs
- Number: 16

Youth career
- 2007–2014: SC Sopron
- 2014–2018: SV Mattersburg

Senior career*
Years	Team	Apps	(Gls)
2017–2020	SV Mattersburg II	49	(3)
2020	SV Mattersburg	3	(0)
2020	SKN St. Pölten II	1	(0)
2020–2021	SKN St. Pölten	5	(0)
2021–2022	Zalaegerszeg	0	(0)
2022	→ SV Horn (loan)	12	(0)
2023–	Pécs	30	(0)

International career
2016–2017	Hungary U17	17	(0)
2017–2019	Hungary U19	14	(0)
2019	Hungary U21	3	(0)
- * Club domestic league appearances and goals as of 21 December 2023

Martin Majnovics (born 26 October 2000) is a Hungarian professional footballer who plays as a defender for Pécs.

== Club career ==
Majnovics started his youth career with hometown club SC Sopron and moved to Austria in 2014 to join SV Mattersburg. By the end of 2016–17 season, he started to play for club's reserve side in Landesliga Burgenland – fourth division of Austrian football league system. He also won back-to-back Landesliga Burgenland titles with the reserve team. He made his professional debut for club's first team on 23 June 2020 in a 1–1 draw against Rheindorf Altach.

Mattersburg went bankrupt after 2019–20 season and Majnovics joined fellow Bundesliga side SKN St. Pölten in October 2020. He signed a contract with the club until June 2022.

On 7 February 2022, Majnovics returned to Austria and joined SV Horn on loan until the end of the season.

On 18 January 2023, Majnovics signed with Pécs.

== International career ==
Majnovics is a former Hungarian youth international. He was part of under-17 team squad which reached quarter-finals of 2017 UEFA European Under-17 Championship.

== Career statistics ==
=== Club ===
As of match played on 28 February 2021.

Club	Season	League			Cup		Continental		Total	
Club	Season	Division	Apps	Goals	Apps	Goals	Apps	Goals	Apps	Goals
SV Mattersburg II	2016–17	Landesliga Burgenland	3	0	—		—		3	0
SV Mattersburg II	2017–18	Landesliga Burgenland	7	0	—		—		7	0
SV Mattersburg II	2018–19	Austrian Regionalliga East	23	2	—		—		23	2
SV Mattersburg II	2019–20	Austrian Regionalliga East	16	1	—		—		16	1
SV Mattersburg II	Total		49	3	0	0	0	0	49	3
SV Mattersburg	2019–20	Austrian Bundesliga	3	0	0	0	—		3	0
SKN St. Pölten II	2020–21	1. Niederösterreichische Landesliga	1	0	—		—		1	0
SKN St. Pölten	2020–21	Austrian Bundesliga	1	0	0	0	—		1	0
Career total			54	3	0	0	0	0	54	3
