= Aron Bjarnason =

Icelandic footballer

Personal information
- Date of birth: 14 October 1995 (age 31)
- Place of birth: Iceland
- Height: 1.73 m (5 ft 8 in)
- Position: Left winger

Team information
- Current team: Breiðablik
- Number: 11

Youth career
- –2012: Þróttur Reykjavík

Senior career*
Years	Team	Apps	(Gls)
2012–2013	Þróttur Reykjavík	15	(0)
2013–2014	Fram	25	(5)
2015–2016	ÍBV	38	(7)
2017–2019	Breiðablik	50	(12)
2019–2021	Újpest	16	(0)
2020	→ Valur (loan)	18	(7)
2021–2024	Sirius	60	(6)
2024–	Breiðablik	58	(11)

International career^{‡}
2012	Iceland U18	3	(1)
2013–2014	Iceland U19	7	(0)
2023–	Iceland	1	(0)
- * Club domestic league appearances and goals as of 1 November 2026 ‡ National team caps and goals as of 13 January 2023

Aron Bjarnason (born 14 October 1995) is an Icelandic professional football player who plays for Icelandic club Breiðablik.

== Club career ==
In 2019 he was signed by Nemzeti Bajnokság I club Újpest FC. In 2020, he was sent on a season-long loan to Valur in his home country of Iceland. In February 2021, he was signed by Sirius.

== Club statistics ==
Updated to games played as of 7 February 2021.

Club	Season	League		Cup		Europe		Other		Total	
Club	Season	Apps	Goals	Apps	Goals	Apps	Goals	Apps	Goals	Apps	Goals
Þróttur Reykjavík
Þróttur Reykjavík	2012	4	0	0	0	–	–	2^{a}	0	6	0
Þróttur Reykjavík	2013	11	0	2	0	–	–	7^{a}	2	20	2
Þróttur Reykjavík	Total	15	0	2	0	0	0	9	2	26	2
Fram
Fram	2013	8	1	1	0	–	–	–	–	9	1
Fram	2014	17	4	2	0	0	0	7^{b}	1	26	5
Fram	Total	25	5	3	0	0	0	7	1	35	6
ÍBV
ÍBV	2015	17	2	3	1	–	–	7^{a}	0	27	3
ÍBV	2016	21	5	5	0	–	–	5^{a}	1	31	6
ÍBV	Total	38	7	8	1	0	0	12	1	58	9
Breiðablik
Breiðablik	2017	21	6	1	0	–	–	6^{a}	1	28	7
Breiðablik	2018	19	2	2	0	–	–	3^{a}	1	24	3
Breiðablik	2019	10	4	2	1	2	0	5^{a}	3	19	8
Breiðablik	Total	50	12	5	1	2	0	14	5	71	18
Újpest
Újpest	2019–20	16	0	2	2	–	–	–	–	18	2
Újpest	2020–21	0	0	0	0	–	–	–	–	0	0
Újpest	Total	16	0	2	2	0	0	–	–	18	2
Valur
Valur	2020	18	7	3	1	–	–	–	–	21	8
Sirius
Sirius	2021	0	0	0	0	–	–	–	–	0	0
Sirius	Total	0	0	0	0	0	0	–	–	0	0
Career Total		145	31	21	5	2	0	42	9	210	45

^{a. Icelandic League Cup}
^{b. 6 games and 1 goal in Icelandic League Cup and 1 game in Icelandic Men's Football Super Cup.}
