= Aleksandar Tanasin =

Serbian footballer (born 1991)

Personal information
- Date of birth: 15 November 1991 (age 34)
- Place of birth: Novi Sad, SFR Yugoslavia
- Height: 1.76 m (5 ft 9 in)
- Position: Right-back

Team information
- Current team: Kabel
- Number: 28

Youth career
- 2006–2009: Vojvodina

Senior career*
Years	Team	Apps	(Gls)
2009–2011	Vojvodina	0	(0)
2009–2010	→ Metalac Futog (loan)	24	(4)
2010–2011	→ Cement Beočin (loan)	27	(1)
2011–2015	Proleter Novi Sad	106	(3)
2015–2016	Borac Čačak	51	(0)
2017–2018	Radnik Surdulica	20	(0)
2018–2020	Proleter Novi Sad	57	(0)
2020–2021	Zalaegerszeg	14	(0)
2021	Zalaegerszeg II	2	(0)
2021–2022	Proleter Novi Sad	23	(0)
2022–2023	Spartak Subotica	30	(1)
2023–2025	Mladost Novi Sad	24	(1)
2025–	Kabel	28	(0)
- * Club domestic league appearances and goals as of 14 May 2026

Aleksandar Tanasin (Serbian Cyrillic: Александар Танасин; born 15 November 1991) is a Serbian professional footballer who plays as a defender for Kabel Novi Sad.

== Club career ==
=== Metalac Futog ===
Born in Novi Sad, Tanasin is a product of Vojvodina's youth school. He was loaned to Metalac Futog for 2009–10 season. He made 24 league appearances and scored 4 goals in Serbian League Vojvodina.

=== Cement Beočin ===
After successful season in Futog, Tanasin moved to Cement Beočin. He made 27 Serbian League Vojvodina caps and scored 1 goal for the 2010–11 Serbian League Vojvodina season.

=== Proleter Novi Sad ===
Tanasin joined Proleter Novi Sad in 2011–12 season. During four seasons playing for Proleter, mostly as a first choice in the right-back position, he collected 106 first league appearances, and scored 3 goals. He made 4 cup caps, too. Although he is a defender, he also played as a winger in some matches. He was the captain in some matches.

=== Borac Čačak ===
In summer 2015, Tanasin moved to Serbian SuperLiga club Borac Čačak, under coach Nenad Lalatović, who knows him from the time when he led Proleter. Tanasin made his SuperLiga debut for Borac Čačak in the 1st fixture, against Radnički Niš on 17 July 2015. Playing for Borac, Tanasin made over 50 SuperLiga caps and also noted several cup matches between 2015 and 2016. At the beginning of 2017, Tanasin left the club as a free agent after the end of contract.

== Career statistics ==
As of 8 January 2017

Club	Season	League			Cup		Continental		Other		Total	
Club	Season	Division	Apps	Goals	Apps	Goals	Apps	Goals	Apps	Goals	Apps	Goals
Vojvodina	2009–10	Serbian SuperLiga	—		—		—		—		—	
Vojvodina	2010–11	Serbian SuperLiga	—		—		—		—		—	
Vojvodina	Total		—		—		—		—		—	
Metalac Futog (loan)	2009–10	Serbian League Vojvodina	24	4	—		—		—		24	4
Cement Beočin (loan)	2010–11	Serbian League Vojvodina	27	1	—		—		—		27	1
Proleter Novi Sad	2011–12	Serbian First League	26	1	0	0	—		—		26	1
Proleter Novi Sad	2012–13	Serbian First League	30	0	1	0	—		—		31	0
Proleter Novi Sad	2013–14	Serbian First League	27	0	1	0	—		—		28	0
Proleter Novi Sad	2014–15	Serbian First League	23	2	2	0	—		—		25	2
Proleter Novi Sad	Total		106	3	4	0	—		—		110	3
Borac Čačak	2015–16	Serbian SuperLiga	33	0	3	0	—		—		36	0
Borac Čačak	2016–17	Serbian SuperLiga	18	0	1	0	—		—		19	0
Borac Čačak	Total		51	0	4	0	—		—		55	0
Career total			208	8	8	0	—		—		216	8
