= Andreias Calcan =

Romanian footballer (born 1994)

Personal information
- Full name: Andreias Cristian Calcan
- Date of birth: 9 April 1994 (age 32)
- Place of birth: Slatina, Romania
- Height: 1.72 m (5 ft 8 in)
- Position: Winger

Youth career
- 2001–2008: CSȘ Slatina
- 2008–2010: Ardealul Cluj
- 2010–2013: Universitatea Cluj

Senior career*
Years	Team	Apps	(Gls)
2012–2016	Universitatea Cluj	42	(1)
2014	→ CSM Râmnicu Vâlcea (loan)	7	(0)
2016–2018	Willem II	12	(0)
2017–2018	→ Dordrecht (loan)	33	(6)
2018–2019	Almere City	17	(4)
2019–2020	Viitorul Constanța	18	(5)
2020	Újpest	9	(2)
2020–2021	Politehnica Iași	22	(4)
2021–2022	Mezőkövesd	21	(2)
2022–2023	Argeș Pitești	35	(3)
2023	Universitatea Cluj	4	(0)
2024–2026	Cherno More	36	(2)

International career
2015–2016	Romania U21	6	(0)
- * Club domestic league appearances and goals as of 25 May 2026

Andreias Cristian Calcan (born 9 April 1994) is a Romanian professional footballer who plays as a winger.

== Club career ==
=== Early years and Universitatea Cluj ===
Calcan started playing football in his hometown as a youngster for CSS Slatina under the command of Ion Pârvulescu, the coach who previously discovered two other significant Romanian players– Ionel Dănciulescu and Claudiu Niculescu. When he was fourteen he moved to Ardealul Cluj of Cluj-Napoca and in 2010 he joined FC Universitatea Cluj together with twelve other teammates. On 23 August 2013, Calcan made his debut in Liga I, the Romanian top football league, in a 6–0 away loss against FC Dinamo București.

=== Willem II ===
On 22 July 2016, Calcan moved abroad for the first time to sign a two-year contract with Dutch side Willem II.

=== Cherno More ===
On 14 February, Calcan joined Cherno More for the spring of the 2023–24 season, first starting mainly as a substitute, but by the end of the season he became a starter, playing a total of 14 matches, 8 matches as a starter and 6 as a substitute. He also scored 2 goals against Ludogorets and Levski respectively in 4–0 and 3–1 wins, and one assist in a 3–0 win over Lokomotiv Sofia. The following season, he started 4 matches as a starter and 2 as a substitute, scoring one goal against Hapoel Beer Sheva in the 2nd match of the 2nd qualifying round of the Conference League, but the sailors lost 1–2. Before a match with Botev Vratsa, he tore cruciate ligaments and his season ended. He returned to Cherno More's group in a 2–0 win over Dobrudzha, returning to the field against Montana in a 1–3 win, entering in the last minute.

== Career statistics ==
As of match played 25 May 2026

Appearances and goals by club, season and competition
Club	Season	League			National cup (Note: Includes Cupa României, KNVB Beker, Magyar Kupa)		Europe		Other		Total	
Club	Season	Division	Apps	Goals	Apps	Goals	Apps	Goals	Apps	Goals	Apps	Goals
Universitatea Cluj	2012–13	Liga I	0	0	1	0	–		–		1	0
Universitatea Cluj	2013–14	Liga I	18	0	1	0	–		–		19	0
Universitatea Cluj	2014–15	Liga I	9	0	1	0	–		–		10	0
Universitatea Cluj	2015–16	Liga II	15	1	2	0	–		–		16	1
Universitatea Cluj	Total		42	1	5	0	–		–		47	1
CSM Râmnicu Vâlcea (loan)	2014–15	Liga II	7	0	1	0	–		–		8	0
Willem II	2016–17	Eredivisie	11	0	0	0	–		–		11	0
Willem II	2017–18	Eredivisie	1	0	–		–		–		1	0
Willem II	Total		12	0	0	0	–		–		12	0
Dordrecht (loan)	2017–18	Eerste Divisie	33	6	1	0	–		3 (Note: Appearances in Eredivisie promotion/relegation play-offs)	0	37	6
Almere City	2018–19	Eerste Divisie	17	4	1	0	–		–		18	4
Viitorul Constanța	2018–19	Liga I	9	4	3	0	–		–		12	4
Viitorul Constanța	2019–20	Liga I	9	1	1	0	2 (Note: Appearances in UEFA Europa League)	0	1 (Note: Appearance in Supercupa României)	0	13	1
Viitorul Constanța	Total		18	5	4	0	2	0	1	0	25	5
Újpest	2018–19	Nemzeti Bajnokság I	9	2	2	0	–		–		11	2
Újpest	2020–21	Nemzeti Bajnokság I	0	0	–		–		–		0	0
Újpest	Total		9	2	2	0	–		–		11	2
Politehnica Iași	2020–21	Liga I	22	4	2	1	–		–		24	5
Mezőkövesd	2021–22	Nemzeti Bajnokság I	21	1	1	1	–		–		22	2
Argeș Pitești	2022–23	Liga I	35	3	3	0	–		2 (Note: Appearances in Liga I promotion/relegation play-offs)	0	40	3
Universitatea Cluj	2023–24	Liga I	4	0	1	0	–		–		5	0
Cherno More	2023–24	First League	14	2	–		–		–		14	2
Cherno More	2024–25	First League	4	0	0	0	2 (Note: Appearances in UEFA Conference League)	1	–		6	1
Cherno More	2025–26	First League	18	0	1	0	0	0	–		18	0
Cherno More	Total		36	2	1	0	2	1	–		39	3
Career total			256	28	22	2	4	1	6	0	288	31

== Honours ==
Universitatea Cluj

- Cupa României runner-up– 2014–15

Viitorul Constanța

- Cupa României– 2018–19
- Supercupa României– 2019
