= Bertalan Kun =

Hungarian footballer

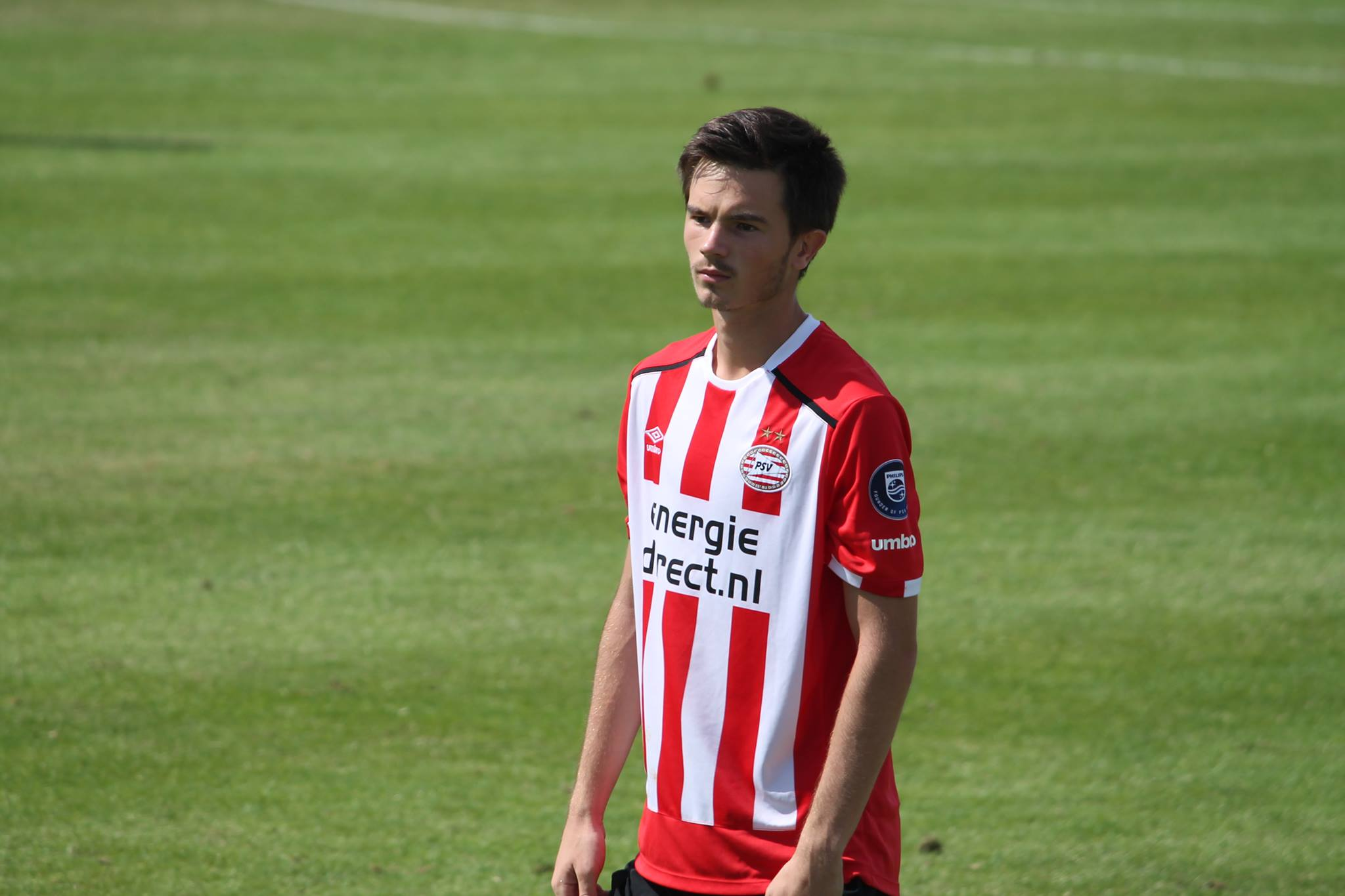

Personal information
- Date of birth: 6 May 1999 (age 27)
- Place of birth: Veszprém, Hungary
- Height: 1.81 m (5 ft 11 1/2 in)
- Position: Midfielder

Team information
- Current team: Budafok
- Number: 14

Youth career
- 2005–2011: Veszprém FC USE
- 2011–2018: PSV Eindhoven

Senior career*
Years	Team	Apps	(Gls)
2016–2019	Jong PSV	24	(1)
2019–2020	Győri ETO	11	(0)
2020–2021	Zalaegerszeg	1	(0)
2021–2022	Proleter Novi Sad	23	(1)
2023	Kozármisleny	10	(1)
2023–2024	Veszprém	21	(2)
2024–	Budafok	45	(5)

International career^{‡}
2013–2014	Hungary U15	5	(1)
2014–2015	Hungary U16	10	(1)
2015–2016	Hungary U17	2	(0)
2016–2017	Hungary U18	5	(0)
2016	Hungary U19	1	(0)
- * Club domestic league appearances and goals as of 31 May 2026 ‡ National team caps and goals as of 29 September 2021

Bertalan Kun (born 6 May 1999) is a Hungarian professional footballer who plays as a midfielder for Budafok.

== Playing career ==
=== Early career ===
Bertalan Kun started to play in Veszprém FC USE in 2005 when he was six. His first coach was Miklós Kelemen. From the U6 team he reached the higher levels. In the 2010–2011 season, when Csaba Kozma was his coach, he scored 11 goals in 20 games in the U13 team of North-West group of NBII. One year later he scored 58 goals in 16 games and he became the top scorer of his level.

=== PSV ===
His father got a two-year job contract in the Netherlands and his son moved with him to Eindhoven. There he joined the PSV D1 team which was trained in the De Herdgang training complex. In 2011 PSV Eindhoven launched an application for the international transfer of underage players but the FIFA rejected it at the first time. After this, they sent this petition twice but none of them were successful. However, on 25 August 2015 they received the permission when the European Union authorizes the transfers of the players over the age of 16 within the EU. Between 2011 and 2015 Bertalan Kun could play in PSV Eindhoven because his club sent him to many international tournaments and friendly games.

He debuted among the adults on 6 November 2016 when he got an opportunity in Jong PSV which is the reserve team of PSV Eindhoven in the Dutch second division. He was replaced in the 65 minutes in a league game against FC Volendam but they lose 0–1. In December there were rumours in the press about several Premier League and Portuguese first division club want to sign him. The news was confirmed by his manager.

=== Győri ETO ===
After leaving Jong PSV in the summer 2019, Kun returned to Hungary and signed a deal until the summer 2021 with Győri ETO FC on 8 October 2019.

Next he played one season with Zalaegerszeg.

=== Proleter ===
In September 2021 he signed ŵith Serbian side FK Proleter Novi Sad.

=== Kozármisleny ===
On 14 December 2022, Kun signed with second-tier NB II club Kozármisleny.

== International career ==
He was called up to his first national team (Hungary national Under-15 football team) in November 2013 from György Korolovszky. His debut was against Slovakia (0-0) on 5 November 2013. His debut score was against Turkey (3-3) on 10 April 2014.

He was called up to the U16 team in August 2014 from István Mihalecz. He played ten times here and he scored in the 4th minute of a Hungary – Latvia game (4–0) on 10 March 2015.

He was called up to the U17 team in September 2015, under manager Zoltán Szélesi. He would play in this national team only twice. He was not entered to the European U17 Championship in 2016.

In August 2016 Antal Németh called up him to the U18 team. He made his debut against Russia in this age group on 16 August 2016.

In October 2016 the U19 team manager, Michael Boris called up him to the Hungary national team. He debuted against Greece on 13 October and he played the whole game.

== Career statistics ==
=== Club ===
As of match played 7 February 2022

Appearances and goals by club, season and competition
Club	Season	League			National Cup		Total	
Club	Season	Division	Apps	Goals	Apps	Goals	Apps	Goals
Jong PSV	2016–17	Eerste Divisie	2	0	—		2	0
Jong PSV	2017–18	Eerste Divisie	0	0	—		0	0
Jong PSV	2018–19	Eerste Divisie	22	1	—		22	1
Jong PSV	Total		24	1	0	0	24	1
Győri ETO	2019–20	NB II	11	0	1	0	12	0
Zalaegerszeg	2020–21	NB I	1	0	3	0	4	0
Proleter Novi Sad	2021–22	SuperLiga	12	1	1	0	13	1
Career total			48	2	5	0	53	2

=== International ===
National team	Years	Apps	Goals
Hungary U15	2013–2014	5	1
Hungary U16	2014–2015	10	1
Hungary U17	2015–2016	2	0
Hungary U18	2016–2017	5	0
Hungary U19	2016	1	0
Total		22	2
