= Márk Koszta =

Hungarian footballer

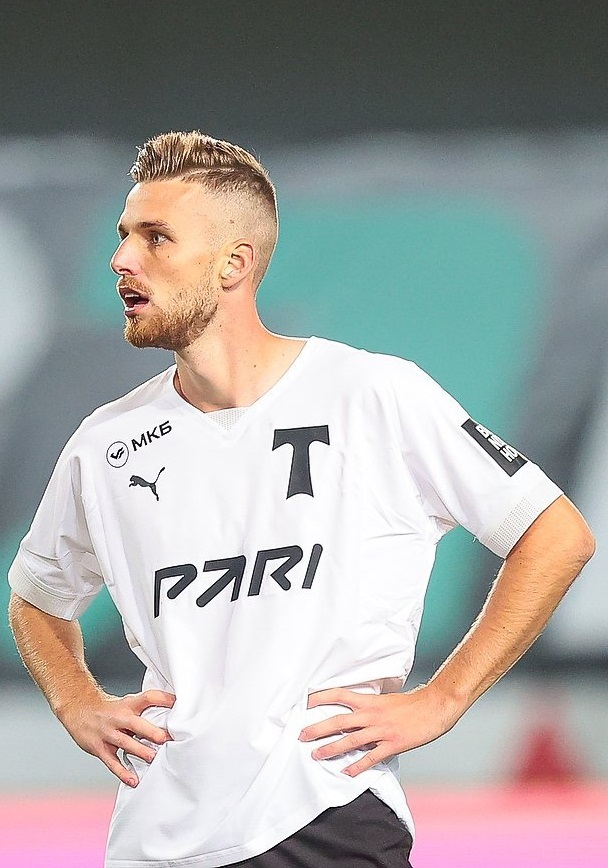
- Koszta with Torpedo Moscow in 2022

Personal information
- Date of birth: 26 September 1996 (age 30)
- Place of birth: Miskolc, Hungary
- Height: 1.84 m (6 ft 1/2 in)
- Position: Forward

Team information
- Current team: Hapoel Petah Tikva
- Number: 9

Youth career
- 2003–2007: Putnok
- 2007–2010: Kazincbarcika
- 2010–2014: Honvéd

Senior career*
Years	Team	Apps	(Gls)
2013–2017	Honvéd	32	(6)
2013–2015	→ Honvéd II	30	(5)
2015–2016	→ Kisvárda (loan)	27	(9)
2017	→ Honvéd II	1	(2)
2017–2019	Mezőkövesd	53	(14)
2019–2020	Újpest	18	(3)
2020–2022	Zalaegerszeg	53	(19)
2022	Ulsan Hyundai	0	(0)
2022–2024	Torpedo Moscow	4	(0)
2023–2024	→ Maccabi Bnei Reineh (loan)	47	(12)
2024–2025	Volos	24	(5)
2025–	Hapoel Petah Tikva	30	(8)

International career
2013–2014	Hungary U-18	4	(0)
2017	Hungary U-21	3	(0)
- * Club domestic league appearances and goals as of 23 June 2026

Márk Koszta (Hungarian: Koszta Márk; born 26 September 1996) is a Hungarian professional footballer who plays as a forward in Israel club Hapoel Petah Tikva.

== Club career ==
On 4 September 2022, Koszta signed with Russian Premier League club FC Torpedo Moscow.

On 8 June 2023, Maccabi Bnei Reineh opted for a loan extension after a very successful performance.

On 8 July 2024, Koszta joined Volos in Greece following the termination of his Tordeo Moscow contract.

On 15 September 2025, Koszta joined Hapoel Petah Tikva in Israel.

== Career statistics ==
As of match played 14 December 2022

Appearances and goals by club, season and competition
Club	Season	League			National cup (Note: Includes Magyar Kupa, Korean FA Cup, Russian Cup, Israel State Cup, Greek Football Cup)		League cup (Note: Includes Ligakupa, Toto Cup)		Continental		Total	
Club	Season	Division	Apps	Goals	Apps	Goals	Apps	Goals	Apps	Goals	Apps	Goals
Honvéd II	2013–14	Nemzeti Bajnokság III	13	2	–		–		–		13	2
Honvéd II	2014–15	Nemzeti Bajnokság III	17	4	–		–		–		17	4
Honvéd II	2016–17	Nemzeti Bajnokság III	1	2	–		–		–		1	2
Honvéd II	Total		31	8	–		–		–		31	8
Honvéd	2013–14	Nemzeti Bajnokság I	0	0	0	0	1	0	0	0	1	0
Honvéd	2014–15	Nemzeti Bajnokság I	1	0	0	0	7	0	–		8	0
Honvéd	2016–17	Nemzeti Bajnokság I	31	6	0	0	–		–		31	6
Honvéd	Total		32	6	0	0	8	0	0	0	40	6
Kisvárda (loan)	2015–16	Nemzeti Bajnokság II	27	9	2	3	–		–		29	12
Mezőkövesd	2017–18	Nemzeti Bajnokság I	31	10	1	0	–		–		32	10
Mezőkövesd	2018–19	Nemzeti Bajnokság I	22	4	4	3	–		–		26	7
Mezőkövesd	Total		53	14	5	3	–		–		58	17
Újpest	2019–20	Nemzeti Bajnokság I	18	3	3	1	–		–		21	4
Zalaegerszeg	2020–21	Nemzeti Bajnokság I	28	8	3	5	–		–		31	13
Zalaegerszeg	2021–22	Nemzeti Bajnokság I	25	11	2	1	–		–		27	12
Zalaegerszeg	Total		53	19	5	6	–		–		58	25
Ulsan Hyundai	2022	K League 1	0	0	2	1	–		5 (Note: Appearances in AFC Champions League)	2	7	3
Torpedo Moscow	2022–23	Russian Premier League	4	0	2	0	–		–		6	0
Maccabi Bnei Reineh (loan)	2022–23	Israeli Premier League	13	8	1	0	–		–		14	8
Maccabi Bnei Reineh (loan)	2023–24	Israeli Premier League	34	4	0	0	5	0	–		39	4
Maccabi Bnei Reineh (loan)	Total		47	12	1	0	5	0	–		53	12
Volos	2024–25	Super League Greece	13	4	2	1	–		–		15	5
Hapoel Petah Tikva	2025–26	Israeli Premier League	0	0	0	0	–		–		0	0
Career total			278	75	22	15	13	0	5	2	318	92
