= 2022–23 Újpest FC season =

Újpest
2022–23 season
- Chairman: Roland Duchâtelet
- Manager: Miloš Kruščić
- Stadium: Szusza Ferenc Stadion
- Nemzeti Bajnokság I: 8th
- Magyar Kupa: Round of 16
- Top goalscorer: League: Fernand Gouré (5); Kevin Csoboth (5); All: Fernand Gouré (8)
- Highest home attendance: 6,981 vs Ferencváros (4 September 2022); Nemzeti Bajnokság I
- Lowest home attendance: 1,984 vs Kisvárda (1 October 2022); Nemzeti Bajnokság I
- Average home league attendance: 3,103
- Biggest win: 6–1 vs Mátészalka (A) (17 September 2022); Magyar Kupa
- Biggest defeat: 0–6 vs Ferencváros (H) (4 September 2022); Nemzeti Bajnokság I
Home colours	Away colours	Third colours
- All statistics correct as of 20 March 2023.

The 2022–23 season is Újpest Football Club's 142nd competitive season, 131st consecutive season in the Nemzeti Bajnokság I and 130th year in existence as a football club. In addition to the domestic league, Újpest participated in this season's editions of the Magyar Kupa.

== Transfers ==
=== Summer ===
In: Note: Flags indicate national team as defined under FIFA eligibility rules; some limited exceptions apply. Players may hold more than one non-FIFA nationality.

No.	Pos.	Nation	Player
—	GK	SRB	Đorđe Nikolić (from (Switzerland) Basel)
—	MF	SRB	Matija Ljujić (from (Israel) Hapoel Haifa)
—	FW	ITA	Giuseppe Borello (from (Italy) Crotone)
—	MF	NGR	Vincent Onovo (from (Denmark) Randers)
—	FW	HUN	Kevin Csoboth (from Fehérvár)
—	MF	HUN	Bálint Szabó (from Nyíregyháza)
—	FW	SWE	Jack Lahne (loan from (France) Amiens)
—	FW	CIV	Fernand Gouré (loan from (Belgium) Westerlo)
—	DF	BIH	Dženan Bureković (from (Turkey) Göztepe)
—	FW	CIV	Junior Tallo (loan return from (Turkey) Samsunspor)
—	FW	HUN	Márk Mucsányi (loan return from Szentlőrinc)

Out: Note: Flags indicate national team as defined under FIFA eligibility rules; some limited exceptions apply. Players may hold more than one non-FIFA nationality.

No.	Pos.	Nation	Player
5	DF	HUN	Zsolt Máté (loan to Tiszakécske)
8	FW	GEO	Budu Zivzivadze (loan return to Fehérvár)
9	FW	BRA	Fernando Viana (to (Brazil) Criciúma)
13	DF	GRE	Georgios Koutroumpis (to (Turkey) Bandırmaspor)
17	FW	GEO	Giorgi Beridze (to (Turkey) Ankaragücü)
19	MF	CMR	Abdoulaye Yahaya (to (Turkey) Tuzlaspor)
22	MF	SRB	Nikola Mitrović (to Budapest Honvéd)
44	DF	HUN	Tamás Kádár (to Paks)
55	MF	HUN	Péter Szakály
62	DF	HUN	Dominik Kovács (loan to Kazincbarcika)
98	FW	CIV	Mory Koné (to (Turkey) Tuzlaspor)

=== Winter ===
In: Note: Flags indicate national team as defined under FIFA eligibility rules; some limited exceptions apply. Players may hold more than one non-FIFA nationality.

No.	Pos.	Nation	Player
—	DF	GRE	Georgios Antzoulas (from (Greece) Asteras Tripolis)
—	FW	SRB	Ognjen Mudrinski (from (Thailand) Lamphun Warriors)
—	DF	HUN	Dominik Kovács (loan return from Kazincbarcika)
—	DF	LUX	Tim Hall (from (Cyprus) Ethnikos Achna)
—	MF	GER	Luis Jakobi (from (Germany) Türkgücü München)
—	FW	NGR	Peter Ambrose (from (Turkey) Balıkesirspor)
—	MF	HUN	György Varga (from Újpest II)

Out: Note: Flags indicate national team as defined under FIFA eligibility rules; some limited exceptions apply. Players may hold more than one non-FIFA nationality.

No.	Pos.	Nation	Player
8	MF	SRB	Matija Ljujić (loan to (Azerbaijan) Sabail)
14	MF	HUN	Áron Csongvai (to Fehérvár)
15	DF	SRB	Miroslav Bjeloš (to (Serbia) Mladost GAT)
17	FW	CIV	Junior Tallo
20	DF	EST	Märten Kuusk (loan to (Estonia) Flora Tallinn)
26	FW	SWE	Jack Lahne (loan return to (France) Amiens)
27	MF	HUN	Mátyás Katona (to Fehérvár)
28	MF	SRB	Ognjen Radošević (loan to Szentlőrinc)
68	DF	BIH	Dženan Bureković (loan to (Serbia) Spartak Subotica)

== Pre-season and friendlies ==
25 June 2022 Friendly	Újpest (Hungary)	1–1	(Slovakia) Šamorín	Budapest
17:00 CEST		Report		Stadium: Vízművek pálya

2 July 2022 Friendly	MTK Budapest (Hungary)	2–6	(Hungary) Újpest	Budapest
11:00 CEST	Bognár 45+1'; Kovács 69'	Report	Croizet 13'; Tallo 30', 45'; Bjeloš 79', 82'; Antonov 86'	Stadium: Hidegkuti Nándor Stadion

8 July 2022 Friendly	Ried (Austria)	2–4	(Hungary) Újpest	Ried im Innkreis
18:00 CEST	Wießmeier 4'; Nutz 55'	Report	Bjeloš 44', 45'; Ljujić 74'; Croizet 90+1'	Stadium: Josko Arena

12 July 2022 Friendly	Újpest (Hungary)	0–1	(Czech Republic) Bohemians	Olbendorf
17:30 CEST		Report	Kovařík 8'	Stadium: Sportplatz Olbendorf

== Competitions ==
=== Overview ===
Competition	First match	Last match	Starting round	Final position	Record							
Competition	First match	Last match	Starting round	Final position	Pld	W	D	L	GF	GA	GD	Win %
Nemzeti Bajnokság I	30 July 2022	27 May 2023	Matchday 1	8th	33	11	8	14	42	55	−13	33.33
Magyar Kupa	17 September 2022	9 February 2023	Round of 64	Round of 16	3	2	1	0	9	2	+7	66.67
Total					36	13	9	14	51	57	−6	36.11

Source: Competitions

=== Nemzeti Bajnokság I ===
==== League table ====
Pos	Team	Pld	W	D	L	GF	GA	GD	Pts	Qualification or relegation
6	Kisvárda	33	10	13	10	43	49	−6	43	
7	Mezőkövesd	33	11	9	13	40	43	−3	42	
8	Újpest	33	11	8	14	42	55	−13	41	
9	Zalaegerszeg	33	10	9	14	37	43	−6	39	Qualification for the Europa Conference League second qualifying round (Note: Zalaegerszeg qualified to the Europa Conference League second qualifying round as winners of the 2022–23 Magyar Kupa.)
10	Fehérvár	33	8	11	14	38	43	−5	35	

Source: Hungarian Football Federation (in Hungarian), Soccerway
Rules for classification: 1) Points; 2) Matches won; 3) Goal difference; 4) Goals scored; 5) Head-to-head points; 6) Head-to-head goal difference; 7) Fair play ranking; 8) Drawing of lots.

==== Results summary ====
Overall								Home						Away					
Pld	W	D	L	GF	GA	GD	Pts	W	D	L	GF	GA	GD	W	D	L	GF	GA	GD
33	11	8	14	42	55	−13	41	8	5	4	32	28	+4	3	3	10	10	27	−17

Source: Soccerway

==== Results by round ====
Round	1	2	3	4	5	6	7	8	9	10	11	12	13	14	15	16	17	18	19	20	21	22	23	24	25	26	27	28	29	30	31	32	33
Ground	H	A	H	A	H	A	H	H	H	H	A	A	H	A	H	A	H	A	A	A	A	H	H	A	H	A	H	A	H	H	A	H	A
Result	D	L	D	W	L	D	L	W	W	L	L	L	D	L	W	L	W	L	W	L	D	D	W	L	W	D	W	W	L	D	L	W	L
Position	7	11	10	6	7	8	10	9	6	7	8	11	11	10	10	10	10	10	9	9	9	10	9	10	9	9	7	6	6	6	8	7	8

Source: Matches
A = Away; H = Home; W = Win; D = Draw; L = Loss

==== Matches ====
30 July 2022 1	Újpest	1–1	Mezőkövesd	Budapest
20:00 CEST (UTC+2)	Katona 35'	Report	Jurina 65'	Stadium: Szusza Ferenc Stadion; Attendance: 3,023; Referee: Csaba Pintér

7 August 2022 2	Puskás Akadémia	2–0	Újpest	Felcsút
17:45 CEST (UTC+2)	Corbu 38', 62'; Skribek (red card) 64'	Report		Stadium: Pancho Aréna; Attendance: 2,000; Referee: Tamás Bognár

13 August 2022 3	Újpest	1–1	Zalaegerszeg	Budapest
20:15 CEST (UTC+2)	Tallo 90+3'	Report	Németh 32'; Gergényi (red card) 45+1'	Stadium: Szusza Ferenc Stadion; Attendance: 3,219; Referee: István Vad

22 August 2022 4	Fehérvár	0–1	Újpest	Székesfehérvár
19:00 CEST (UTC+2)		Report	Pauljević 80'	Stadium: MOL Aréna Sóstó; Attendance: 2,347; Referee: Ádám Farkas

26 August 2022 5	Újpest	2–3	Paks	Budapest
20:00 CEST (UTC+2)	Diaby 66'; Gouré 76'	Report	Windecker 7'; B. Varga 52' (pen.); Papp 57'	Stadium: Szusza Ferenc Stadion; Attendance: 2,596; Referee: Mihály Káprály

1 September 2022 6	Budapest Honvéd	0–0	Újpest	Budapest
19:00 CEST (UTC+2)		Report		Stadium: Bozsik Aréna; Attendance: 4,085; Referee: Balázs Berke

4 September 2022 7	Újpest	0–6	Ferencváros	Budapest
17:30 CEST (UTC+2)		Report	Zachariassen 9'; Boli 24', 45' (pen.); Traoré 32'; Auzqui 67'; R. Mmaee 89'	Stadium: Szusza Ferenc Stadion; Attendance: 6,981; Referee: Tamás Bognár

11 September 2022 8	Újpest	2–1	Vasas	Budapest
20:00 CEST (UTC+2)	Katona 11'; Diaby 69'	Report	Holender 20'	Stadium: Szusza Ferenc Stadion; Attendance: 2,444; Referee: Ferenc Karakó

1 October 2022 9	Újpest	4–0	Kisvárda	Budapest
14:30 CEST (UTC+2)	Vranjanin 31' (o.g.); Gouré 36', 45+1'; Simon 67'	Report	Kovačić (red card) 59'; Ötvös (red card) 90+3'	Stadium: Szusza Ferenc Stadion; Attendance: 1,984; Referee: Csaba Pintér

7 October 2022 10	Újpest	1–2	Kecskemét	Budapest
20:05 CEST (UTC+2)	Diaby 90+14'	Report	Tóth 56'; B. Katona 80'	Stadium: Szusza Ferenc Stadion; Attendance: 2,852; Referee: Sándor Andó-Szabó

16 October 2022 11	Debrecen	4–1	Újpest	Debrecen
13:45 CEST (UTC+2)	Dzsudzsák 18'; Sós 53'; Varga 77'; Baráth 90+1'	Report	Simon 32'	Stadium: Nagyerdei Stadion; Attendance: 6,114; Referee: Péter Antal

24 October 2022 12	Mezőkövesd	1–0	Újpest	Mezőkövesd
18:00 CEST (UTC+2)	Dražić 46'	Report		Stadium: Városi Stadion; Attendance: 1,979; Referee: Péter Zierkelbach

30 October 2022 13	Újpest	3–3	Puskás Akadémia	Budapest
15:00 CET (UTC+1)	Diaby 24'; Antonov 66' (pen.); Csongvai 82'; Csoboth (red card) 33'	Report	Puljić 11'; Zahedi 77', 86'; Băluță (red card) 45'; Spandler (red card) 82'	Stadium: Szusza Ferenc Stadion; Attendance: 2,323; Referee: Gergő Bogár

5 November 2022 14	Zalaegerszeg	1–0	Újpest	Zalaegerszeg
19:30 CET (UTC+1)	Szalay 23'; Csóka (red card) 55'	Report		Stadium: ZTE Arena; Attendance: 2,412; Referee: József Erdős

9 November 2022 15	Újpest	2–1	Fehérvár	Budapest
20:00 CET (UTC+1)	Csoboth 8'; Szabó 58'	Report	Serafimov 66'; Bamgboye (red card) 90+4'	Stadium: Szusza Ferenc Stadion; Attendance: 2,038; Referee: Csaba Pintér

12 November 2022 16	Paks	3–1	Újpest	Paks
16:00 CET (UTC+1)	Papp 44'; Hahn 48'; Varga 77'	Report	Ambrose 68'	Stadium: Fehérvári úti Stadion; Attendance: 2,132; Referee: István Vad

29 January 2023 17	Újpest	2–1	Budapest Honvéd	Budapest
15:30 CET (UTC+1)	Kastrati 61'; Antonov 76' (pen.)	Report	Lukić 30' (pen.)	Stadium: Szusza Ferenc Stadion; Attendance: 4,044; Referee: Ferenc Karakó

5 February 2023 18	Ferencváros	3–1	Újpest	Budapest
17:30 CET (UTC+1)	Hall 38' (o.g.); Marquinhos 70'; Mmaee 85'	Report	Mudrinski 55'; Nikolić (red card) 80'	Stadium: Groupama Arena; Attendance: 18,197; Referee: Balázs Berke

12 February 2023 19	Vasas	0–1	Újpest	Budapest
17:30 CET (UTC+1)		Report	Csoboth 47'; Hámori (red card) 90+7'	Stadium: Illovszky Rudolf Stadion; Attendance: 1,700; Referee: Csaba Pintér

17 February 2023 20	Kisvárda	2–1	Újpest	Kisvárda
20:00 CET (UTC+1)	Kovačić 35'; Makowski 52'	Report	Simon 47'	Stadium: Várkerti Stadion; Attendance: 1,890; Referee: Márton Rúsz

26 February 2023 21	Kecskemét	2–2	Újpest	Kecskemét
14:00 CET (UTC+1)	Tóth 83', 90+5'	Report	Simon 12'; Varga 52'	Stadium: Széktói Stadion; Attendance: 3,751; Referee: Marcell Derdák

5 March 2023 22	Újpest	1–1	Debrecen	Budapest
18:30 CET (UTC+1)	Mudrinski 37'	Report	Pauljević 17' (o.g.); Manrique (red card) 60'	Stadium: Szusza Ferenc Stadion; Attendance: 3,189; Referee: Ferenc Karakó

12 March 2023 23	Újpest	1–0	Mezőkövesd	Budapest
16:00 CET (UTC+1)	Mudrinski 10'	Report	Lehoczky (red card) 74'	Stadium: Szusza Ferenc Stadion; Attendance: 2,547; Referee: Sándor Andó-Szabó

19 March 2023 24	Puskás Akadémia	5–1	Újpest	Felcsút
15:30 CET (UTC+1)	Corbu 10'; Colley 62', 68'; Slagveer 74'; Zahedi 89'	Report	Varga 83'	Stadium: Pancho Aréna; Attendance: 1,840; Referee: István Vad

1 April 2023 25	Újpest	3–2	Zalaegerszeg	Budapest
15:00 CEST (UTC+2)	Csoboth 30', 47', 75'	Report	Antzoulas 62' (o.g.); Ubochioma 66'	Stadium: Szusza Ferenc Stadion; Attendance: 3,338; Referee: Mihály Kápráy

8 April 2023 26	Fehérvár	0–0	Újpest	Székesfehérvár
17:00 CEST (UTC+2)	Kodro (yellow card) 21'; Csongvai (yellow card) 27'	Report	Hall (yellow card) 9'	Stadium: MOL Aréna Sóstó; Attendance: 4,953; Referee: Csaba Pintér

16 April 2023 27	Újpest	3–2	Paks	Budapest
18:00 CEST (UTC+2)	Gouré 7'; Nikolić (yellow card) 29'; Mörschel 45+4'; Antonov 84' (pen.)	Report	Varga 32' (pen.), 52'; Szélpál (yellow card) 48'; Papp (yellow card) 84'	Stadium: Szusza Ferenc Stadion; Attendance: 3,184; Referee: István Vad

21 April 2023 28	Budapest Honvéd	0–1	Újpest	Budapest
20:00 CEST (UTC+2)	Lovrić (yellow card) 60'; Benczenleitner (yellow card) 77'; Lukić (yellow card) 85'	Report	Hall (yellow card) 25'; Gouré 89'; Mack (yellow card) 90'	Stadium: Bozsik Aréna; Attendance: 6,284; Referee: Balázs Berke

1 May 2023 29	Újpest	2–3	Ferencváros	Budapest
18:00 CEST (UTC+2)	Gouré 41', (yellow card) 65'; Csoboth (yellow card) 45+4'; Jakobi (yellow card) 81'; Simon 90+3'; Hall (yellow card) 90+9'	Report	Gojak 24', 54', (yellow card) 28'; Pászka (yellow card) 45+5'; Marquinhos (yellow card) 58'; Lisztes 60'; Botka (yellow card) 65'	Stadium: Szusza Ferenc Stadion; Attendance: 11,109; Referee: Gergő Bogár

6 May 2023 30	Újpest	1–1	Vasas	Budapest
14:00 CEST (UTC+2)	Antzoulas 42'	Report	Urblík (yellow card) 26'; Holender (yellow card) 31', (goal) 37'; Novothny (yellow card) 50'; Berecz (yellow card) 90+3'	Stadium: Szusza Ferenc Stadion; Attendance: 3,880; Referee: Ferenc Karakó

14 May 2023 31	Kisvárda	2–0	Újpest	Kisvárda
15:30 CEST (UTC+2)	Jovičić (yellow card) 37'; Hey (yellow card) 49'; Karabelyov (yellow card) 55'; Leoni 67'; Ilievski 79'	Report	Antzoulas (red card) 21'; Csoboth (yellow card) 58'; Diaby (yellow card) 70'	Stadium: Várkerti Stadion; Attendance: 2,670; Referee: József Erdős

21 May 2023 32	Újpest	3–0	Kecskemét	Budapest
17:30 CEST (UTC+2)	Mörschel (yellow card) 38'; Gouré 45', 55'	Report	B. Tóth (yellow card) 16'; Vágó (yellow card) 50'; Hadaró (yellow card) 76'; Májer (yellow card) 80'; Ryashko (red card) 83'	Stadium: Szusza Ferenc Stadion; Attendance: 4,792; Referee: Ádám Farkas

27 May 2023 33	Debrecen	2–0	Újpest	Debrecen
20:00 CEST (UTC+2)	Lagator 27', (yellow card) 86'; Manrique 54'; Kusnyír (yellow card) 56'	Report	Gouré (yellow card) 18'; Pauljević (yellow card) 20'; Diaby (yellow card) 73'	Stadium: Nagyerdei Stadion; Attendance: 14,014; Referee: Gergő Bogár

=== Magyar Kupa ===
17 September 2022 Round of 64	Mátészalka	1–6	Újpest	Mátészalka
13:00 CEST (UTC+2)	Sárosi 8'	Report	Csongvai 21'; Csoboth 24'; Gouré 41'; Bureković 62'; Ljujić 74'; Varga 82' (pen.)	Stadium: Mátészalkai Városi Sporttelep; Attendance: 2,000; Referee: Imre Kovács

19 October 2022 Round of 32	Ajka	1–3	Újpest	Ajka
17:00 CEST (UTC+2)	Jagodics 45+1'	Report	Csongvai 18'; Gouré 50', 61'	Stadium: Városi Stadion; Attendance: 3,500; Referee: Márton Rúsz

9 February 2023 Round of 16	Puskás Akadémia	0–0 (a.e.t.) (5–4 p)	Újpest	Felcsút
19:00 CET (UTC+1)		Report		Stadium: Pancho Aréna; Attendance: 1,720; Referee: Gergő Bogár
	Penalties
	Puljić (penalty scored); van Nieff (penalty scored); Corbu (penalty missed); Gruber (penalty scored); Favorov (penalty scored); Batik (penalty scored)		(penalty scored) Boumal; (penalty missed) Simon; (penalty scored) Antonov; (penalty scored) Csongvai; (penalty missed) Gouré
Note: Puskás Akadémia won on penalty kicks 5–4

== Statistics ==
=== Appearances and goals ===
Last updated on 20 March 2023.

No.	Pos	Nat	Player	Total		Nemzeti Bajnokság I		Magyar Kupa	
No.	Pos	Nat	Player	Apps	Goals	Apps	Goals	Apps	Goals
1	GK	(Serbia) SRB	Filip Pajović	1	-6	1	-6	0	-0
2	DF	(Kosovo) KOS	Lirim Kastrati	11	1	10	1	1	0
4	DF	(Mali) MLI	Abdoulaye Diaby	21	4	18	4	3	0
5	MF	(Cameroon) CMR	Petrus Boumal	17	0	15	0	2	0
6	MF	(Germany) GER	Luca Mack	18	0	16	0	2	0
7	MF	(Hungary) HUN	Krisztián Simon	19	4	16	4	3	0
8	MF	(Dominican Republic) DOM	Heinz Mörschel	3	0	3	0	0	0
10	MF	(France) FRA	Yohan Croizet	4	0	4	0	0	0
11	DF	(Serbia) SRB	Nemanja Antonov	23	2	21	2	2	0
13	GK	(Serbia) SRB	Đorđe Nikolić	20	-32	17	-30	3	-2
18	MF	(Hungary) HUN	Bálint Szabó	17	1	16	1	1	0
19	FW	(Ivory Coast) CIV	Fernand Gouré	18	6	15	3	3	3
21	MF	(Hungary) HUN	György Varga	11	3	9	2	2	1
23	GK	(Hungary) HUN	Dávid Banai	7	-8	7	-8	0	-0
29	MF	(Nigeria) NGR	Vincent Onovo	23	0	20	0	3	0
32	FW	(Nigeria) NGR	Peter Ambrose	6	1	6	1	0	0
33	FW	(Hungary) HUN	Márk Mucsányi	1	0	1	0	0	0
34	DF	(Luxembourg) LUX	Tim Hall	9	0	8	0	1	0
39	MF	(Germany) GER	Luis Jakobi	14	0	13	0	1	0
42	DF	(Greece) GRE	Georgios Antzoulas	5	0	5	0	0	0
45	DF	(North Macedonia) MKD	Stefan Jevtoski	2	0	2	0	0	0
49	DF	(Serbia) SRB	Branko Pauljević	26	1	23	1	3	0
77	MF	(Hungary) HUN	Kevin Csoboth	20	3	17	2	3	1
82	FW	(Italy) ITA	Giuseppe Borello	11	0	10	0	1	0
91	FW	(Serbia) SRB	Ognjen Mudrinski	9	3	8	3	1	0
Youth players:
3	DF	(Hungary) HUN	Csanád Fehér	0	0	0	0	0	0
62	MF	(Hungary) HUN	Dominik Kovács	0	0	0	0	0	0
99	GK	(Hungary) HUN	Tamás Hámori	0	0	0	-0	0	-0
Out to loan:
8	MF	(Serbia) SRB	Matija Ljujić	13	1	11	0	2	1
20	DF	(Estonia) EST	Märten Kuusk	5	0	5	0	0	0
28	MF	(Serbia) SRB	Ognjen Radošević	1	0	0	0	1	0
68	DF	(Bosnia and Herzegovina) BIH	Dženan Bureković	1	1	0	0	1	1
Players no longer at the club:
14	MF	(Hungary) HUN	Áron Csongvai	21	3	18	1	3	2
15	MF	(Serbia) SRB	Miroslav Bjeloš	12	0	11	0	1	0
17	FW	(Ivory Coast) CIV	Junior Tallo	12	1	11	1	1	0
19	MF	(Cameroon) CMR	Abdoulaye Yahaya	0	0	0	0	0	0
26	FW	(Sweden) SWE	Jack Lahne	8	0	6	0	2	0
27	MF	(Hungary) HUN	Mátyás Katona	20	2	18	2	2	0
98	FW	(Ivory Coast) CIV	Mory Koné	1	0	1	0	0	0

=== Top scorers ===
Includes all competitive matches. The list is sorted by shirt number when total goals are equal.

Last updated on 20 March 2023

Position	Nation	Number	Name	Nemzeti Bajnokság I	Magyar Kupa	Total
1	(Ivory Coast)	19	Fernand Gouré	3	3	6
2	(Mali)	4	Abdoulaye Diaby	4	0	4
2	(Hungary)	7	Krisztián Simon	4	0	4
4	(Hungary)	14	Áron Csongvai	1	2	3
4	(Hungary)	21	György Varga	2	1	3
4	(Hungary)	77	Kevin Csoboth	2	1	3
4	(Serbia)	91	Ognjen Mudrinski	3	0	3
8	(Serbia)	11	Nemanja Antonov	2	0	2
8	(Hungary)	27	Mátyás Katona	2	0	2
10	(Kosovo)	2	Lirim Kastrati	1	0	1
10	(Serbia)	8	Matija Ljujić	0	1	1
10	(Ivory Coast)	17	Junior Tallo	1	0	1
10	(Hungary)	18	Bálint Szabó	1	0	1
10	(Nigeria)	32	Peter Ambrose	1	0	1
10	(Serbia)	49	Branko Pauljević	1	0	1
10	(Bosnia and Herzegovina)	68	Dženan Bureković	0	1	1
/	/	/	Own Goals	1	0	1
			TOTALS	29	9	38

=== Hat-tricks ===
Player	Against	Result	Date	Competition	Round
(Hungary) Kevin Csoboth	Zalaegerszeg	3–2 (H)	1 April 2023	Nemzeti Bajnokság I	25

=== Disciplinary record ===
Includes all competitive matches. Players with 1 card or more included only.

Last updated on 20 March 2023

Position	Nation	Number	Name	Nemzeti Bajnokság I		Magyar Kupa		Total (Hu Total)	
Position	Nation	Number	Name	Yellow card	Red card	Yellow card	Red card	Yellow card	Red card
DF	(Kosovo)	2	Lirim Kastrati	2	0	1	0	3 (2)	0 (0)
DF	(Mali)	4	Abdoulaye Diaby	4	0	0	0	4 (4)	0 (0)
MF	(Cameroon)	5	Petrus Boumal	1	0	1	0	2 (1)	0 (0)
MF	(Germany)	6	Luca Mack	3	0	0	0	3 (3)	0 (0)
MF	(Serbia)	8	Matija Ljujić	1	0	0	0	1 (1)	0 (0)
DF	(Serbia)	11	Nemanja Antonov	5	0	0	0	5 (5)	0 (0)
GK	(Serbia)	13	Đorđe Nikolić	1	1	0	0	1 (1)	1 (1)
MF	(Hungary)	14	Áron Csongvai	4	0	1	0	5 (4)	0 (0)
MF	(Serbia)	15	Miroslav Bjeloš	5	0	1	0	6 (5)	0 (0)
FW	(Ivory Coast)	17	Junior Tallo	2	0	0	0	2 (2)	0 (0)
MF	(Hungary)	18	Bálint Szabó	2	0	0	0	2 (2)	0 (0)
DF	(Estonia)	20	Märten Kuusk	1	0	0	0	1 (1)	0 (0)
FW	(Sweden)	26	Jack Lahne	1	0	0	0	1 (1)	0 (0)
MF	(Hungary)	27	Mátyás Katona	3	0	2	0	5 (3)	0 (0)
MF	(Nigeria)	29	Vincent Onovo	5	0	0	0	5 (5)	0 (0)
DF	(Luxembourg)	34	Tim Hall	2	0	1	0	3 (2)	0 (0)
MF	(Germany)	39	Luis Jakobi	1	0	0	0	1 (1)	0 (0)
DF	(Greece)	42	Georgios Antzoulas	2	0	0	0	2 (2)	0 (0)
DF	(Serbia)	49	Branko Pauljević	3	0	0	0	3 (3)	0 (0)
MF	(Hungary)	77	Kevin Csoboth	0	1	1	0	1 (0)	1 (1)
FW	(Italy)	82	Giuseppe Borello	1	0	0	0	1 (1)	0 (0)
FW	(Serbia)	91	Ognjen Mudrinski	0	0	1	0	1 (0)	0 (0)
GK	(Hungary)	99	Tamás Hámori	0	1	0	0	0 (0)	1 (1)
			TOTALS	49	3	9	0	58 (49)	3 (3)

=== Clean sheets ===
Last updated on 9 April 2023

Position	Nation	Number	Name	Nemzeti Bajnokság I	Magyar Kupa	Total
1	(Serbia)	13	Đorđe Nikolić	4	1	5
2	(Hungary)	23	Dávid Banai	2	0	2
3	(Serbia)	1	Filip Pajović	0	0	0
4	(Hungary)	99	Tamás Hámori	0	0	0
			TOTALS	6	1	7
