= 2021–22 Újpest FC season =

Újpest
2021–22 season
- Chairman: Roland Duchâtelet
- Manager: Michael Oenning (until 31 December); Miloš Kruščić (from 13 January)
- Nemzeti Bajnokság I: 5th
- Hungarian Cup: Semi-finals
- UEFA Europa Conference League: Third qualifying round
- Top goalscorer: League: Budu Zivzivadze (11); All: Giorgi Beridze (12)
- Highest home attendance: 5,523 vs Ferencváros (30 January 2022); Nemzeti Bajnokság I
- Lowest home attendance: 1,161 vs Paks (12 December 2021); Nemzeti Bajnokság I
- Average home league attendance: 2,582
- Biggest win: 4–0 vs Zalaegerszeg (H) (16 April 2022); Nemzeti Bajnokság I
- Biggest defeat: 0–4 vs Basel (A) (12 August 2021); UEFA Europa Conference League
| Home colours | Away colours | Third colours |

The 2021–22 season was Újpest Football Club's 141st competitive season, 130th consecutive season in the OTP Bank Liga and 129th year in existence as a football club. In addition to the domestic league, Újpest participated in this season's editions of the Magyar Kupa and the inaugural UEFA Europa Conference League.

== Squad ==
As of match played 4 August 2021

| No. | Name | Nationality | Position | Date of birth (age) | Signed from | Signed in | Apps. | Goals |
Goalkeepers
| 1 | Filip Pajović | (Serbia) | GK | 30 July 1993 (aged 28) | Čukarički | 2017 | 0 | 0 |
| 23 | Dávid Banai | (Hungary) | GK | 9 May 1994 (aged 27) | youth sector | 2012 | 0 | 0 |
| 34 | Zoltán Tomori | (Hungary) | GK | 7 May 1999 (aged 22) | Budapest Honvéd II | 2020 | 0 | 0 |
Defenders
| 2 | Lirim Kastrati | (Kosovo) | DF | 2 February 1999 (aged 22) | Bologna youth | 2020 | 0 | 0 |
| 4 | Abdoulaye Diaby | (Mali) | DF | 4 July 2000 (aged 21) | Royal Antwerp | 2021 | 0 | 0 |
| 5 | Zsolt Máté | (Hungary) | DF | 14 September 1997 (aged 23) | youth sector | 2019 | 0 | 0 |
| 13 | Georgios Koutroumpis | (Greece) | DF | 10 February 1991 (aged 30) | OFI Crete | 2020 | 0 | 0 |
| 19 | Mauro Cerqueira | (Portugal) | DF | 20 August 1992 (aged 28) | Académica Coimbra | 2020 | 0 | 0 |
| 21 | Nemanja Antonov | (Serbia) | DF | 6 May 1995 (aged 26) | Royal Mouscron | 2020 | 0 | 0 |
| 49 | Branko Pauljević | (Serbia) | DF | 12 June 1989 (aged 32) | Puskás Akadémia | 2017 | 0 | 0 |
| TBA | Kristóf Szűcs | (Hungary) | DF | 3 January 1997 (aged 24) | youth sector | 2017 | 0 | 0 |
Midfielders
| 6 | Luca Mack | (Germany) | MF | 25 May 2000 (aged 21) | Stuttgart | 2021 | 0 | 0 |
| 8 | András Stieber | (Hungary) | MF | 8 October 1991 (aged 29) | Budaörs | 2020 | 0 | 0 |
| 14 | Áron Csongvai | (Hungary) | MF | 31 October 2000 (aged 20) | youth sector | 2019 | 0 | 0 |
| 15 | Miroslav Bjeloš | (Serbia) | MF | 29 October 1990 (aged 30) | Napredak Kruševac | 2020 | 0 | 0 |
| 20 | Vincent Onovo | (Nigeria) | MF | 10 December 1995 (aged 25) | HJK Helsinki | 2018 | 0 | 0 |
| 22 | Nikola Mitrović | (Serbia) | MF | 2 January 1987 (aged 34) | Zalaegerszeg | 2020 | 0 | 0 |
| 24 | Yohan Croizet | (France) | MF | 15 February 1992 (aged 29) | OH Leuven | 2021 | 0 | 0 |
| 27 | Mátyás Katona | (Hungary) | MF | 30 December 1999 (aged 21) | youth sector | 2020 | 0 | 0 |
| 45 | Stefan Jevtoski | (North Macedonia) | MF | 2 September 1997 (aged 23) | Rabotnički | 2021 | 0 | 0 |
| 55 | Péter Szakály | (Hungary) | MF | 17 August 1986 (aged 34) | Puskás Akadémia | 2019 | 0 | 0 |
Forwards
| 7 | Krisztián Simon | (Hungary) | FW | 10 June 1991 (aged 30) | 1860 München | 2017 | 0 | 0 |
| 8 | Junior Tallo | (Ivory Coast) | FW | 21 December 1992 (aged 28) | Chambly | 2020 | 0 | 0 |
| 9 | Fernando Viana | (Brazil) | FW | 20 February 1992 (aged 29) | Kisvárda | 2021 | 0 | 0 |
| 10 | Zoltán Stieber | (Hungary) | FW | 16 October 1988 (aged 32) | Zalaegerszeg | 2020 | 0 | 0 |
| 17 | Giorgi Beridze | (Georgia (country)) | FW | 12 May 1997 (aged 24) | Gent | 2020 | 0 | 0 |
| 33 | Márk Mucsányi | (Hungary) | FW | 16 November 2001 (aged 19) | youth sector | 2021 | 0 | 0 |
Players away on loan
Players who left during the season

== Transfers ==
=== Summer ===
In: Note: Flags indicate national team as defined under FIFA eligibility rules; some limited exceptions apply. Players may hold more than one non-FIFA nationality.

| No. | Pos. | Nation | Player |
|---|---|---|---|
| 3 | DF | HUN | Csanád Fehér (from Újpest II) |
| 4 | DF | MLI | Abdoulaye Diaby (from (Belgium) Royal Antwerp) |
| 6 | MF | GER | Luca Mack (from (Germany) Stuttgart) |
| 9 | FW | BRA | Fernando Viana (from Kisvárda) |
| 45 | MF | MKD | Stefan Jevtoski (from (North Macedonia) Rabotnički) |
| 62 | DF | HUN | Dominik Kovács (from Újpest II) |
| 98 | FW | CIV | Mory Koné (from (Armenia) Ararat Yerevan) |
| — | DF | HUN | Kristóf Szűcs (loan return from Ajka) |

Out: Note: Flags indicate national team as defined under FIFA eligibility rules; some limited exceptions apply. Players may hold more than one non-FIFA nationality.

| No. | Pos. | Nation | Player |
|---|---|---|---|
| 3 | DF | MNE | Jovan Baošić (to (Montenegro) Budućnost Podgorica) |
| 4 | DF | MKD | Kire Ristevski (to (Cyprus) AEL Limassol) |
| 6 | FW | MAR | Yassine El Ghanassy (released) |
| 9 | FW | HUN | Patrik Bacsa (to Győr) |
| 19 | DF | POR | Mauro Cerqueira (released) |
| 20 | MF | NGR | Vincent Onovo (to (Denmark) Randers) |
| 77 | FW | CRO | Antonio Perošević (to (India) East Bengal) |
| — | FW | MLI | Victor Kantabadouno (loan return to (Guinea) Wakriya) |

=== Winter ===
In: Note: Flags indicate national team as defined under FIFA eligibility rules; some limited exceptions apply. Players may hold more than one non-FIFA nationality.

| No. | Pos. | Nation | Player |
|---|---|---|---|
| — | DF | EST | Märten Kuusk (from (Estonia) Flora Tallinn) |
| — | MF | CMR | Abdoulaye Yahaya (from (Croatia) Lokomotiva Zagreb) |

Out: Note: Flags indicate national team as defined under FIFA eligibility rules; some limited exceptions apply. Players may hold more than one non-FIFA nationality.

| No. | Pos. | Nation | Player |
|---|---|---|---|
| 5 | DF | HUN | Zsolt Máté (loan to Tiszakécske) |
| 8 | FW | CIV | Junior Tallo (loan to (Turkey) Samsunspor) |
| 10 | FW | HUN | Zoltán Stieber (to MTK Budapest) |

== Competitions ==
=== Overview ===
| Competition | First match | Last match | Starting round | Final position | Record | | | | | | | |
| Competition | First match | Last match | Starting round | Final position | Pld | W | D | L | GF | GA | GD | Win % |
|---|---|---|---|---|---|---|---|---|---|---|---|---|
| Nemzeti Bajnokság I | 1 August 2021 | 13 May 2022 | Matchday 1 | 5th | 33 | 12 | 8 | 13 | 50 | 48 | +2 | 36.36 |
| Hungarian Cup | 18 September 2021 | 19 April 2022 | Round of 64 | Semi-Finals | 5 | 4 | 0 | 1 | 10 | 7 | +3 | 80.00 |
| UEFA Europa Conference League | 22 July 2021 | 12 August 2021 | Second qualifying round | Third qualifying round | 4 | 2 | 0 | 2 | 6 | 8 | −2 | 50.00 |
| Total | | | | | 42 | 18 | 8 | 16 | 66 | 63 | +3 | 42.86 |

Last updated: 15 February 2023
Source: Competitions

=== Nemzeti Bajnokság I ===
==== League table ====
| Pos | Team | Pld | W | D | L | GF | GA | GD | Pts | Qualification or relegation |
|---|---|---|---|---|---|---|---|---|---|---|
| 3 | Puskás Akadémia | 33 | 14 | 12 | 7 | 43 | 34 | +9 | 54 | Qualification for the Europa Conference League second qualifying round (Note: Since the winners of the 2021–22 Magyar Kupa, Ferencváros, qualified for the Champions League, the Europa Conference League berth awarded to the Magyar Kupa winners was transferred to the highest-placed Nemzeti Bajnokság I team not already qualified for European competition, the fourth-placed team.) |
| 4 | Fehérvár | 33 | 13 | 9 | 11 | 48 | 43 | +5 | 48 | Qualification for the Europa Conference League second qualifying round |
| 5 | Újpest | 33 | 12 | 8 | 13 | 50 | 48 | +2 | 44 | |
| 6 | Paks | 33 | 12 | 7 | 14 | 75 | 63 | +12 | 43 | |
| 7 | Debrecen | 33 | 10 | 9 | 14 | 45 | 52 | −7 | 39 | |

Source: Hungarian Football Federation (in Hungarian), Soccerway
Rules for classification: 1) Points; 2) Matches won; 3) Goal difference; 4) Goals scored; 5) Head-to-head points; 6) Head-to-head goal difference; 7) Head-to-head away goals scored; 8) Fair play ranking; 9) Drawing of lots.

==== Results summary ====
| Overall | | | | | | | | Home | | | | | | Away | | | | | |
| Pld | W | D | L | GF | GA | GD | Pts | W | D | L | GF | GA | GD | W | D | L | GF | GA | GD |
|---|---|---|---|---|---|---|---|---|---|---|---|---|---|---|---|---|---|---|---|
| 33 | 12 | 8 | 13 | 50 | 48 | +2 | 44 | 7 | 5 | 5 | 28 | 22 | +6 | 5 | 3 | 8 | 22 | 26 | −4 |

Last updated: 15 February 2023.
Source: Soccerway

==== Results by round ====
| Round | 1 | 2 | 3 | 4 | 5 | 6 | 7 | 8 | 9 | 10 | 11 | 12 | 13 | 14 | 15 | 16 | 17 | 18 | 19 | 20 | 21 | 22 | 23 | 24 | 25 | 26 | 27 | 28 | 29 | 30 | 31 | 32 | 33 |
|---|---|---|---|---|---|---|---|---|---|---|---|---|---|---|---|---|---|---|---|---|---|---|---|---|---|---|---|---|---|---|---|---|---|
| Ground | H | A | H | H | A | H | A | H | A | H | A | A | H | A | A | H | A | H | A | H | A | H | H | A | H | H | A | H | A | H | A | H | A |
| Result | L | D | D | L | L | D | L | L | D | W | D | L | W | W | L | W | L | L | L | D | W | W | W | W | L | W | W | W | L | D | L | D | W |
| Position | 11 | 8 | 8 | 12 | 12 | 11 | 11 | 12 | 12 | 12 | 12 | 12 | 12 | 10 | 11 | 10 | 10 | 10 | 11 | 12 | 11 | 10 | 9 | 6 | 9 | 7 | 5 | 4 | 6 | 6 | 6 | 6 | 5 |

Updated to match(es) played on 15 May 2022. Source: Matches
A = Away; H = Home; W = Win; D = Draw; L = Loss

==== Matches ====
| 1 August 2021 1 | Újpest | 1–2 | Puskás Akadémia | Budapest |
| 20:00 CEST | Katona 64' | Report | Băluță 43'; Nunes 56' | Stadium: Szusza Ferenc Stadion; Attendance: 1,533; Referee: Csaba Pintér |

| 8 August 2021 2 | Debrecen | 2–2 | Újpest | Debrecen |
| 17:45 CEST | Tischler 77', 87' | Report | Croizet 6', 50' | Stadium: Nagyerdei Stadion; Attendance: 7,266; Referee: Gergő Bogár |

| 15 August 2021 3 | Újpest | 1–1 | Budapest Honvéd | Budapest |
| 20:00 CEST | Katona 34' | Report | Lukić 60' (pen.) | Stadium: Szusza Ferenc Stadion; Attendance: 2,025; Referee: Balázs Berke |

| 22 August 2021 4 | Újpest | 1–2 | MTK Budapest | Budapest |
| 18:00 CEST | Tallo 66' | Report | Miovski 72'; Vancsa 90+2' | Stadium: Szusza Ferenc Stadion; Attendance: 1,866; Referee: Tamás Bognár |

| 29 August 2021 5 | Paks | 2–1 | Újpest | Paks |
| 20:00 CEST | Ádám 3'; Hahn 56' (pen.) | Report | Stieber 18' | Stadium: Fehérvári úti Stadion; Attendance: 1,476; Referee: Ferenc Karakó |

| 13 September 2021 6 | Újpest | 2–2 | Zalaegerszeg | Budapest |
| 20:00 CEST | Beridze 13'; Bjeloš 90+2' | Report | Koszta 82'; Špoljarić 90+3' | Stadium: Szusza Ferenc Stadion; Attendance: 1,308; Referee: Péter Solymosi |

| 26 September 2021 7 | Ferencváros | 3–1 | Újpest | Budapest |
| 17:00 CEST | R. Mmaee 5' (pen.); Nguen 42'; Uzuni 87' | Report | Tallo 47' | Stadium: Groupama Arena; Attendance: 17,349; Referee: Gergő Bogár |

| 2 October 2021 8 | Újpest | 1–3 | Gyirmót | Budapest |
| 14:45 CEST | Kastrati 52' | Report | Varga 11', 27' (pen.); Szegi 16' | Stadium: Szusza Ferenc Stadion; Attendance: 1,456; Referee: Balázs Berke |

| 17 October 2021 9 | Kisvárda | 0–0 | Újpest | Kisvárda |
| 14:30 CEST | | Report | | Stadium: Várkerti Stadion; Attendance: 2,520; Referee: Csaba Pintér |

| 22 October 2021 10 | Újpest | 1–0 | Fehérvár | Budapest |
| 20:00 CEST | Csongvai 50' | Report | | Stadium: Szusza Ferenc Stadion; Attendance: 1,508; Referee: Sándor Andó-Szabó |

| 30 October 2021 11 | Mezőkövesd | 2–2 | Újpest | Mezőkövesd |
| 14:45 CEST | Jurina 18'; Koutroumpis 61' (o.g.) | Report | Kocsis 26' (o.g.); Bjeloš 82' | Stadium: Városi Stadion; Attendance: 1,820; Referee: Péter Solymosi |

| 6 November 2021 12 | Puskás Akadémia | 2–1 | Újpest | Felcsút |
| 17:00 CET | Băluță 50'; Kozák 90' | Report | Beridze 90+7' | Stadium: Pancho Aréna; Attendance: 500; Referee: Balázs Berke |

| 20 November 2021 13 | Újpest | 3–1 | Debrecen | Budapest |
| 17:00 CET | Beridze 20'; Koné 57'; Deslandes 87' (o.g.) | Report | Dzsudzsák 28' (pen.) | Stadium: Szusza Ferenc Stadion; Attendance: 1,667; Referee: József Erdős |

| 27 November 2021 14 | Budapest Honvéd | 1–2 | Újpest | Bozsik Stadion |
| 19:30 CET | Hidi 35' | Report | Bjeloš 80'; Viana 90+1' | Stadium: Budapest; Attendance: 3,088; Referee: István Vad |

| 5 December 2021 15 | MTK Budapest | 2–1 | Újpest | Budapest |
| 16:00 CET | Kovácsréti 87'; Miovski 90+7' (pen.) | Report | Croizet 84' | Stadium: Hidegkuti Nándor Stadion; Attendance: 1,977; Referee: Ferenc Karakó |

| 12 December 2021 16 | Újpest | 4–3 | Paks | Budapest |
| 13:30 CET | Beridze 7', 43'; Csongvai 9'; Croizet 47' | Report | Ádám 4' (pen.); Böde 60'; Papp 83' | Stadium: Szusza Ferenc Stadion; Attendance: 1,161; Referee: Sándor Andó-Szabó |

| 19 December 2021 17 | Zalaegerszeg | 2–0 | Újpest | Zalaegerszeg |
| 18:45 CET | Halilović 59'; Ubochioma 67' | Report | | Stadium: ZTE Arena; Attendance: 1,088; Referee: Tamás Bognár |

| 30 January 2022 18 | Újpest | 0–1 | Ferencváros | Budapest |
| 20:00 CET | | Report | Lončar 78' | Stadium: Szusza Ferenc Stadion; Attendance: 5,523; Referee: Balázs Berke |

| 5 February 2022 19 | Gyirmót | 1–0 | Újpest | Győr |
| 17:00 CET | Varga 64' (pen.) | Report | | Stadium: Ménfői úti Stadion; Attendance: 1,420; Referee: Bence Csonka |

| 11 February 2022 20 | Újpest | 0–0 | Kisvárda | Budapest |
| 20:00 CET | | Report | | Stadium: Szusza Ferenc Stadion; Attendance: 1,810; Referee: Balázs Berke |

| 20 February 2022 21 | Fehérvár | 1–2 | Újpest | Székesfehérvár |
| 17:45 CET | Nikolic 87' | Report | Croizet 46'; Zivzivadze 74' | Stadium: MOL Aréna Sóstó; Attendance: 3,228; Referee: Tamás Bognár |

| 27 February 2022 22 | Újpest | 3–1 | Mezőkövesd | Budapest |
| 14:30 CET | Zivzivadze 35', 53'; Bjeloš 85' | Report | Cseri 45' | Stadium: Szusza Ferenc Stadion; Attendance: 2,606; Referee: Ferenc Karakó |

| 5 March 2022 23 | Újpest | 2–1 | Puskás Akadémia | Budapest |
| 17:00 CET | Zivzivadze 32'; Pauljević 72' | Report | Favorov 26' | Stadium: Szusza Ferenc Stadion; Attendance: 2,512; Referee: Tamás Bognár |

| 12 March 2022 24 | Debrecen | 1–2 | Újpest | Debrecen |
| 14:30 CET | Dzsudzsák 65' (pen.) | Report | Zivzivadze 5'; Antonov 48' | Stadium: Nagyerdei Stadion; Attendance: 6,011; Referee: Gergő Bogár |

| 20 March 2022 25 | Újpest | 0–2 | Budapest Honvéd | Budapest |
| 18:30 CET | | Report | Zsótér 43'; Zinédine Machach 81' | Stadium: Szusza Ferenc Stadion; Attendance: 5,423; Referee: Balázs Berke |

| 3 April 2022 26 | Újpest | 2–0 | MTK Budapest | Budapest |
| 14:30 CET | Katona 33'; Zivzivadze 82' | Report | | Stadium: Szusza Ferenc Stadion; Attendance: 3,269; Referee: Sándor Andó-Szabó |

| 10 April 2022 27 | Paks | 1–3 | Újpest | Paks |
| 14:30 CEST (UTC+2) | Ádám 24' (pen.); Szélpál (yellow card) 34' | Report | Beridze 37'; Zivzivadze 57'; Osváth 69' (o.g.) | Stadium: Fehérvári úti Stadion; Attendance: 2,507; Referee: József Erdős |
Note: Kruščić (yellow card) 27'

| 16 April 2022 28 | Újpest | 4–0 | Zalaegerszeg | Budapest |
| 15:00 CET | Zivzivadze 24', 37'; Beridze 44'; Katona 71' | Report | | Stadium: Szusza Ferenc Stadion; Attendance: 3,467; Referee: Tamás Bognár |

| 24 April 2022 29 | Ferencváros | 2–1 | Újpest | Budapest |
| 17:30 CET | Nguen 19'; Vécsei 39'; Lončar (red card) 90+3' | Report | Zivzivadze 6' (pen.) | Stadium: Groupama Arena; Attendance: 20,155; Referee: Ferenc Karakó |

| 1 May 2022 30 | Újpest | 2–2 | Gyirmót | Budapest |
| 17:00 CET | Mitrović 47'; Onovo 84' | Report | Nagy 14'; Ventúra 90' | Stadium: Szusza Ferenc Stadion; Attendance: 3,441; Referee: Gergő Bogár |

| 5 May 2022 31 | Kisvárda | 2–1 | Újpest | Kisvárda |
| 18:00 CET | Bumba 4'; Asani 30' | Report | Diaby 44' | Stadium: Várkerti Stadion; Attendance: 2,980; Referee: József Erdős |

| 8 May 2022 32 | Újpest | 1–1 | Fehérvár | Budapest |
| 18:45 CET | Croizet 15' | Report | Nikolić 63' | Stadium: Szusza Ferenc Stadion; Attendance: 3,331; Referee: Sándor Andó-Szabó |

| 13 May 2022 33 | Mezőkövesd | 2–3 | Újpest | Mezőkövesd |
| 20:15 CET | Jurina 3'; Beširović 90+3' | Report | Katona 59'; Beridze 66'; Zivzivadze 71' | Stadium: Városi Stadion; Attendance: 2,520; Referee: Mihály Káprály |

=== Hungarian Cup ===
| 18 September 2021 Round of 64 | Tiszakécske | 0–3 | Újpest | Tiszakécske |
| 18:00 CEST (UTC+2) | | Report | Diaby 38', 53'; Beridze 60' | Stadium: Városi Sportcentrum; Attendance: 750; Referee: Zoltán J. Kovács |

| 27 October 2021 Round of 32 | Budafok | 1–2 | Újpest | Budafok, Budapest |
| 18:00 CEST (UTC+2) | Szalai 64' | Report | Beridze 46' (pen.), 88' | Stadium: Promontor utcai Stadion; Attendance: 1,400; Referee: Gábor Barna |

| 8 February 2022 Round of 16 | Újpest | 2–1 | Kisvárda | Budapest |
| 17:15 CEST (UTC+2) | Simon 74'; Csongvai 90+3' | Report | Camaj 68' | Stadium: Szusza Ferenc Stadion; Referee: István Vad |

| 2 March 2022 Quarter-finals | Békéscsaba | 2–3 | Újpest | Békéscsaba |
| 20:00 CEST (UTC+2) | Ilyés 17'; Tóth 77' | Report | Simon 3'; Yahaya 39'; Bjeloš 56' | Stadium: Kórház utcai Stadion; Attendance: 1,920; Referee: Mihály Káprály |

| 19 April 2022 Semi-finals | Paks | 3–0 | Újpest | Paks |
| 20:00 CEST (UTC+2) | Diaby 28' (o.g.); Lenzsér (yellow card) 41'; Windecker 66'; Ádám (yellow card) 69'; Sajbán 86' | Report | Beridze (yellow card) 6'; Antonov (yellow card) 64'; Koutroumpis (red card) 73' | Stadium: Fehérvári úti Stadion; Attendance: 3,214; Referee: Gergő Bogár |

=== UEFA Europa Conference League ===
==== Second qualifying round ====
| 22 July 2021 First leg | Újpest (Hungary) | 2–1 | (Liechtenstein) Vaduz | Szusza Ferenc Stadion, Budapest |
| 21:00 | Stieber 7'; Tallo 64' | Report | Cicek 81' | Attendance: 0 Referee: (Ukraine) Denys Shurman |

| 29 July 2021 Second leg | Vaduz (Liechtenstein) | 1–3 (2–5 agg.) | (Hungary) Újpest | Sportpark, Eschen |
| 18:00 | Dobras 7' | Report | Tallo 28' (pen.); Beridze 47'; Onovo 85' | Attendance: 0 Referee: (Austria) Christian-Petru Ciochirca |

==== Third qualifying round ====
| 5 August 2021 First leg | Újpest (Hungary) | 1–2 | (Switzerland) Basel | Szusza Ferenc Stadion, Budapest |
| 21:00 | Croizet 40' | Report | Cabral 55'; Males 74' | Attendance: 2,367; Referee: (France) Jérôme Brisard |

| 12 August 2021 Second leg | Basel (Switzerland) | 4–0 (6–1 agg.) | (Hungary) Újpest | St. Jakob-Park, Basel |
| 19:30 | Males 22'; Stocker 45+2'; Cabral 71'; Petretta 90' | Report | | Attendance: 12,337; Referee: (Israel) Yigal Frid |

=== Appearances and goals ===
Last updated on 15 February 2023.

| No. | Pos | Nat | Player | Total | | OTP Bank Liga | | Conference League | | Hungarian Cup | |
| No. | Pos | Nat | Player | Apps | Goals | Apps | Goals | Apps | Goals | Apps | Goals |
|---|---|---|---|---|---|---|---|---|---|---|---|
| 1 | GK | (Serbia) SRB | Filip Pajović | 13 | -21 | 7 | -10 | 2 | -5 | 4 | -6 |
| 2 | DF | (Kosovo) KOS | Lirim Kastrati | 36 | 1 | 28 | 1 | 4 | 0 | 4 | 0 |
| 4 | DF | (Mali) MLI | Abdoulaye Diaby | 27 | 3 | 20 | 1 | 4 | 0 | 3 | 2 |
| 5 | MF | (Cameroon) CMR | Petrus Boumal | 13 | 0 | 12 | 0 | 0 | 0 | 1 | 0 |
| 6 | MF | (Germany) GER | Luca Mack | 21 | 0 | 18 | 0 | 0 | 0 | 3 | 0 |
| 7 | MF | (Hungary) HUN | Krisztián Simon | 25 | 2 | 18 | 0 | 4 | 0 | 3 | 2 |
| 8 | FW | (Georgia (country)) GEO | Budu Zivzivadze | 14 | 11 | 12 | 11 | 0 | 0 | 2 | 0 |
| 9 | FW | (Brazil) BRA | Fernando Viana | 23 | 1 | 18 | 1 | 1 | 0 | 4 | 0 |
| 10 | MF | (France) FRA | Yohan Croizet | 33 | 7 | 27 | 6 | 2 | 1 | 4 | 0 |
| 11 | DF | (Serbia) SRB | Nemanja Antonov | 41 | 1 | 32 | 1 | 4 | 0 | 5 | 0 |
| 13 | DF | (Greece) GRE | Georgios Koutroumpis | 39 | 0 | 30 | 0 | 4 | 0 | 5 | 0 |
| 14 | MF | (Hungary) HUN | Áron Csongvai | 38 | 3 | 31 | 2 | 3 | 0 | 4 | 1 |
| 15 | MF | (Serbia) SRB | Miroslav Bjeloš | 29 | 5 | 24 | 4 | 1 | 0 | 4 | 1 |
| 17 | FW | (Georgia (country)) GEO | Giorgi Beridze | 34 | 12 | 27 | 8 | 2 | 1 | 5 | 3 |
| 19 | MF | (Cameroon) CMR | Abdoulaye Yahaya | 7 | 1 | 5 | 0 | 0 | 0 | 2 | 1 |
| 20 | DF | (Estonia) EST | Märten Kuusk | 9 | 0 | 7 | 0 | 0 | 0 | 2 | 0 |
| 22 | MF | (Serbia) SRB | Nikola Mitrović | 40 | 1 | 32 | 1 | 4 | 0 | 4 | 0 |
| 23 | GK | (Hungary) HUN | Dávid Banai | 31 | -41 | 27 | -37 | 2 | -3 | 2 | -1 |
| 27 | MF | (Hungary) HUN | Mátyás Katona | 31 | 5 | 25 | 5 | 3 | 0 | 3 | 0 |
| 44 | DF | (Hungary) HUN | Tamás Kádár | 3 | 0 | 2 | 0 | 0 | 0 | 1 | 0 |
| 45 | MF | (North Macedonia) MKD | Stefan Jevtoski | 3 | 0 | 1 | 0 | 2 | 0 | 0 | 0 |
| 49 | DF | (Serbia) SRB | Branko Pauljević | 34 | 1 | 26 | 1 | 4 | 0 | 4 | 0 |
| 55 | MF | (Hungary) HUN | Péter Szakály | 11 | 0 | 7 | 0 | 3 | 0 | 1 | 0 |
| 98 | FW | (Ivory Coast) CIV | Mory Koné | 13 | 1 | 11 | 1 | 0 | 0 | 2 | 0 |
Youth players:
| 3 | DF | (Hungary) HUN | Csanád Fehér | 0 | 0 | 0 | 0 | 0 | 0 | 0 | 0 |
| 33 | FW | (Hungary) HUN | Márk Mucsányi | 1 | 0 | 0 | 0 | 1 | 0 | 0 | 0 |
| 34 | GK | (Hungary) HUN | Zoltán Tomori | 0 | 0 | 0 | -0 | 0 | -0 | 0 | -0 |
| 62 | DF | (Hungary) HUN | Dominik Kovács | 2 | 0 | 2 | 0 | 0 | 0 | 0 | 0 |
| 77 | FW | (Hungary) HUN | Zsombor Kálnoki-Kis | 0 | 0 | 0 | 0 | 0 | 0 | 0 | 0 |
| 99 | GK | (Hungary) HUN | Tamás Hámori | 0 | 0 | 0 | -0 | 0 | -0 | 0 | -0 |
Out to loan:
| 5 | DF | (Hungary) HUN | Zsolt Máté | 0 | 0 | 0 | 0 | 0 | 0 | 0 | 0 |
| 8 | FW | (Ivory Coast) CIV | Junior Tallo | 13 | 4 | 9 | 2 | 4 | 2 | 0 | 0 |
Players no longer at the club:
| 10 | FW | (Hungary) HUN | Zoltán Stieber | 13 | 2 | 9 | 1 | 2 | 1 | 2 | 0 |
| 20 | MF | (Nigeria) NGR | Vincent Onovo | 20 | 2 | 14 | 1 | 4 | 1 | 2 | 0 |

=== Top scorers ===
Includes all competitive matches. The list is sorted by shirt number when total goals are equal.

Last updated on 15 February 2023

| Position | Nation | Number | Name | OTP Bank Liga | UEFA Conference League | Hungarian Cup | Total |
|---|---|---|---|---|---|---|---|
| 1 | (Georgia (country)) | 17 | Giorgi Beridze | 8 | 1 | 3 | 12 |
| 2 | (Georgia (country)) | 8 | Budu Zivzivadze | 11 | 0 | 0 | 11 |
| 3 | (France) | 24 | Yohan Croizet | 6 | 1 | 0 | 7 |
| 4 | (Hungary) | 27 | Mátyás Katona | 5 | 0 | 0 | 5 |
| 4 | (Serbia) | 15 | Miroslav Bjeloš | 4 | 0 | 1 | 5 |
| 6 | (Ivory Coast) | 8 | Junior Tallo | 2 | 2 | 0 | 4 |
| 7 | (Hungary) | 14 | Áron Csongvai | 2 | 0 | 1 | 3 |
| 7 | (Mali) | 4 | Abdoulaye Diaby | 1 | 0 | 2 | 3 |
| 9 | (Nigeria) | 20 | Vincent Onovo | 1 | 1 | 0 | 2 |
| 9 | (Hungary) | 10 | Zoltán Stieber | 1 | 1 | 0 | 2 |
| 9 | (Hungary) | 7 | Krisztián Simon | 0 | 0 | 2 | 2 |
| 12 | (Ivory Coast) | 98 | Mory Koné | 1 | 0 | 0 | 1 |
| 12 | (Serbia) | 49 | Branko Pauljević | 1 | 0 | 0 | 1 |
| 12 | (Serbia) | 22 | Nikola Mitrović | 1 | 0 | 0 | 1 |
| 12 | (Cameroon) | 19 | Abdoulaye Yahaya | 0 | 0 | 1 | 1 |
| 12 | (Serbia) | 11 | Nemanja Antonov | 1 | 0 | 0 | 1 |
| 12 | (Brazil) | 9 | Fernando Viana | 1 | 0 | 0 | 1 |
| 12 | (Kosovo) | 2 | Lirim Kastrati | 1 | 0 | 0 | 1 |
| / | / | / | Own Goals | 3 | 0 | 0 | 3 |
| | | | TOTALS | 50 | 6 | 10 | 66 |

=== Disciplinary record ===
Includes all competitive matches. Players with 1 card or more included only.

Last updated on 15 February 2023

| Position | Nation | Number | Name | OTP Bank Liga | | UEFA Conference League | | Hungarian Cup | | Total (Hu Total) | |
| Position | Nation | Number | Name | Yellow card | Red card | Yellow card | Red card | Yellow card | Red card | Yellow card | Red card |
| DF | (Kosovo) | 2 | Lirim Kastrati | 5 | 0 | 2 | 0 | 0 | 0 | 6 (4) | 0 (0) |
| MF | (Cameroon) | 5 | Petrus Boumal | 3 | 0 | 0 | 0 | 1 | 0 | 0 (0) | 0 (0) |
| DF | (Mali) | 4 | Abdoulaye Diaby | 4 | 2 | 2 | 0 | 1 | 0 | 7 (4) | 2 (2) |
| MF | (Germany) | 6 | Luca Mack | 2 | 0 | 0 | 0 | 0 | 0 | 2 (2) | 0 (0) |
| MF | (Hungary) | 7 | Krisztián Simon | 2 | 0 | 0 | 0 | 0 | 0 | 2 (2) | 0 (0) |
| FW | (Georgia (country)) | 8 | Budu Zivzivadze | 1 | 0 | 0 | 0 | 0 | 0 | 0 (0) | 0 (0) |
| FW | (Ivory Coast) | 8 | Junior Tallo | 2 | 1 | 1 | 0 | 0 | 0 | 3 (2) | 1 (1) |
| FW | (Brazil) | 9 | Fernando Viana | 4 | 0 | 1 | 0 | 1 | 0 | 3 (2) | 0 (0) |
| MF | (France) | 10 | Yohan Croizet | 6 | 0 | 0 | 0 | 0 | 0 | 3 (3) | 0 (0) |
| FW | (Hungary) | 10 | Zoltán Stieber | 2 | 0 | 0 | 0 | 0 | 0 | 2 (2) | 0 (0) |
| DF | (Serbia) | 11 | Nemanja Antonov | 3 | 0 | 2 | 0 | 3 | 0 | 5 (3) | 0 (0) |
| DF | (Greece) | 13 | Georgios Koutroumpis | 5 | 0 | 0 | 0 | 0 | 1 | 4 (4) | 0 (0) |
| MF | (Hungary) | 14 | Áron Csongvai | 7 | 0 | 0 | 0 | 1 | 0 | 3 (2) | 0 (0) |
| MF | (Serbia) | 15 | Miroslav Bjeloš | 2 | 0 | 0 | 0 | 1 | 0 | 1 (1) | 0 (0) |
| FW | (Georgia (country)) | 17 | Giorgi Beridze | 3 | 0 | 1 | 0 | 1 | 0 | 2 (1) | 0 (0) |
| MF | (Cameroon) | 19 | Abdoulaye Yahaya | 1 | 0 | 0 | 0 | 0 | 0 | 1 (1) | 0 (0) |
| DF | (Estonia) | 20 | Märten Kuusk | 1 | 0 | 0 | 0 | 0 | 0 | 1 (1) | 0 (0) |
| MF | (Nigeria) | 20 | Vincent Onovo | 4 | 0 | 0 | 0 | 0 | 0 | 1 (1) | 0 (0) |
| MF | (Serbia) | 22 | Nikola Mitrović | 4 | 0 | 1 | 0 | 0 | 0 | 3 (2) | 0 (0) |
| GK | (Hungary) | 23 | Dávid Banai | 4 | 0 | 0 | 0 | 0 | 0 | 4 (4) | 0 (0) |
| MF | (Hungary) | 27 | Mátyás Katona | 1 | 0 | 0 | 0 | 0 | 0 | 1 (1) | 0 (0) |
| MF | (North Macedonia) | 45 | Stefan Jevtoski | 1 | 0 | 0 | 0 | 0 | 0 | 1 (1) | 0 (0) |
| DF | (Serbia) | 49 | Branko Pauljević | 3 | 2 | 0 | 0 | 0 | 0 | 1 (1) | 2 (2) |
| | | | TOTALS | 70 | 5 | 10 | 0 | 9 | 1 | 89 (70) | 6 (5) |

=== Clean sheets ===
Last updated on 15 February 2023

| Position | Nation | Number | Name | OTP Bank Liga | UEFA Conference League | Hungarian Cup | Total |
|---|---|---|---|---|---|---|---|
| 1 | (Hungary) | 23 | Dávid Banai | 5 | 0 | 1 | 6 |
| 2 | (Serbia) | 1 | Filip Pajović | 0 | 0 | 1 | 1 |
| 3 | (Hungary) | 34 | Zoltán Tomori | 0 | 0 | 0 | 0 |
| 4 | (Hungary) | 99 | Tamás Hámori | 0 | 0 | 0 | 0 |
| | | | TOTALS | 5 | 0 | 2 | 7 |
