= 2022–23 Fehérvár FC season =

Football season

Fehérvár
2022–23 season
- Owner: István Garancsi
- Head coach: Michael Boris (until 17 October); Szabolcs Huszti; Gábor Toldi (from 17 October to 14 March); Bartosz Grzelak (from 15 March)
- Stadium: MOL Aréna Sóstó
- Nemzeti Bajnokság I: 10th
- Magyar Kupa: Round of 32
- UEFA Europa Conference League: Play-off round
- Top goalscorer: League: Kenan Kodro (11); All: Kenan Kodro (15)
- Highest home attendance: 10,411 vs Köln (25 August 2022); UEFA Europa Conference League
- Lowest home attendance: 1,425 vs Puskás Akadémia (19 October 2022); Magyar Kupa
- Average home league attendance: 3,634
- Biggest win: 5–0 vs Petrocub Hîncești (H) (4 August 2022); UEFA Europa Conference League
- Biggest defeat: 0–4 vs Ferencváros (A) (14 August 2022); Nemzeti Bajnokság I
Home colours	Away colours
- All statistics correct as of 19 March 2023.

The 2022–23 season is Fehérvár Football Club's 82nd season in existence and the 24th consecutive season in the top flight of Hungarian football. In addition to the domestic league, Fehérvár are participating in this season's editions of the Magyar Kupa and the inaugural UEFA Europa Conference League.

== Transfers ==
=== Summer ===
In: Note: Flags indicate national team as defined under FIFA eligibility rules; some limited exceptions apply. Players may hold more than one non-FIFA nationality.

No.	Pos.	Nation	Player
3	DF	DEN	Kasper Larsen (loan from (Denmark) Odense)
6	MF	SVK	Peter Pokorný (loan from (Spain) Real Sociedad)
7	LW	HUN	Szabolcs Schön (from (United States) Dallas)
9	FW	GEO	Budu Zivzivadze (loan return from Újpest)
10	RW	KOS	Lirim Kastrati (from (Poland) Legia Warsaw)
14	FW	HUN	Ákos Szendrei (loan from (Slovakia) Dunajská Streda)
27	FW	HUN	Levente Szabó (loan return from Budafok)
29	DF	HUN	Zsolt Kojnok (loan return from Budaörs)
31	DF	MKD	Nikola Serafimov (from Zalaegerszeg)
35	GK	HUN	Bence Gundel-Takács (loan return from (Croatia) Jarun Zagreb)
42	GK	SRB	Emil Rockov (loan return from (Serbia) Vojvodina)
44	DF	HUN	Márió Zeke (loan return from Gyirmót)
57	GK	HUN	Martin Dala (from Fehérvár II)
68	FW	HUN	Ádám Halmai (loan return from Zalaegerszeg)
77	FW	HUN	Kevin Csoboth (loan return from Szeged)
94	MF	ROU	Claudiu Bumba (from Kisvárda)
96	MF	FRA	Lyes Houri (loan return from (Romania) Universitatea Craiova)
99	FW	HUN	Dániel Zsóri (loan return from Zalaegerszeg)

Out: Note: Flags indicate national team as defined under FIFA eligibility rules; some limited exceptions apply. Players may hold more than one non-FIFA nationality.

No.	Pos.	Nation	Player
4	DF	ROU	Adrian Rus (to (Italy) Shakhtar Donetsk)
7	LW	UKR	Ivan Petryak (to (Ukraine) Pisa)
10	MF	HUN	István Kovács (to Győri ETO)
14	MF	HUN	Norbert Szendrei (to Zalaegerszeg)
15	FW	BIH	Armin Hodžić
17	FW	HUN	Nemanja Nikolić (to (Turkey) Pendikspor)
26	DF	CZE	Michael Lüftner
27	FW	HUN	Levente Szabó (loan to Kecskemét)
30	FW	GAM	Lamin Jallow (loan return to (Italy) Vicenza)
33	DF	HUN	Barnabás Bese
35	GK	HUN	Bence Gundel-Takács (to Budafok)
44	MF	AUT	Peter Žulj (loan return to (Turkey) İstanbul Başakşehir)
44	DF	HUN	Márió Zeke (loan to Kecskemét)
49	FW	HUN	Krisztián Géresi (to Vasas)
68	FW	HUN	Ádám Halmai (to Soroksár)
74	GK	HUN	Ádám Kovácsik (loan to Győri ETO)
77	FW	HUN	Kevin Csoboth (to Újpest)
99	FW	HUN	Dániel Zsóri (to MTK Budapest)

=== Winter ===
In: Note: Flags indicate national team as defined under FIFA eligibility rules; some limited exceptions apply. Players may hold more than one non-FIFA nationality.

No.	Pos.	Nation	Player
—	MF	NOR	Tobias Christensen (from (Norway) Vålerenga)
—	MF	HON	Deiby Flores (from (Greece) Panetolikos)
—	DF	DEN	Kasper Larsen (from (Denmark) Odense)
—	RW	HUN	Zsombor Menyhárt (from Fehérvár II)
—	FW	HUN	Levente Szabó (loan return from Kecskemét)
—	MF	HUN	Áron Csongvai (from Újpest)
—	MF	HUN	Mátyás Katona (from Újpest)

Out: Note: Flags indicate national team as defined under FIFA eligibility rules; some limited exceptions apply. Players may hold more than one non-FIFA nationality.

No.	Pos.	Nation	Player
3	DF	DEN	Kasper Larsen (loan return to (Denmark) Odense)
9	FW	GEO	Budu Zivzivadze (to (Germany) Karlsruhe)
14	FW	HUN	Ákos Szendrei (loan return to (Slovakia) Dunajská Streda)
70	RW	NGR	Funsho Bamgboye (to (Romania) Rapid București)
80	MF	UKR	Bohdan Lyednyev (loan return to (Ukraine) Dynamo Kyiv)

== Competitions ==
=== Overview ===
Competition	First match	Last match	Starting round	Final position	Record							
Competition	First match	Last match	Starting round	Final position	Pld	W	D	L	GF	GA	GD	Win %
Nemzeti Bajnokság I	31 July 2022	27 May 2023	Matchday 1	TBA	33	8	11	14	38	43	−5	24.24
Magyar Kupa	18 September 2022	19 October 2022	Round of 64	Round of 32	2	1	0	1	5	3	+2	50.00
UEFA Europa Conference League	21 July 2022	25 August 2022	First qualifying round	Play-off round	6	4	0	2	14	8	+6	66.67
Total					41	13	11	17	57	54	+3	31.71

Source: Competitions

=== Nemzeti Bajnokság I ===
==== League table ====
Pos	Team	Pld	W	D	L	GF	GA	GD	Pts	Qualification or relegation
8	Újpest	33	11	8	14	42	55	−13	41	
9	Zalaegerszeg	33	10	9	14	37	43	−6	39	Qualification for the Europa Conference League second qualifying round (Note: Zalaegerszeg qualified to the Europa Conference League second qualifying round as winners of the 2022–23 Magyar Kupa.)
10	Fehérvár	33	8	11	14	38	43	−5	35	
11	Budapest Honvéd (R)	33	8	9	16	34	51	−17	33	Relegation to the Nemzeti Bajnokság II
12	Vasas (R)	33	4	14	15	29	43	−14	26	Relegation to the Nemzeti Bajnokság II

Source: Hungarian Football Federation (in Hungarian), Soccerway
Rules for classification: 1) Points; 2) Matches won; 3) Goal difference; 4) Goals scored; 5) Head-to-head points; 6) Head-to-head goal difference; 7) Fair play ranking; 8) Drawing of lots.
(R) Relegated

==== Results summary ====
Overall								Home						Away					
Pld	W	D	L	GF	GA	GD	Pts	W	D	L	GF	GA	GD	W	D	L	GF	GA	GD
33	8	11	14	38	43	−5	35	7	7	2	27	14	+13	1	4	12	11	29	−18

Source: Soccerway

==== Results by round ====
Round	1	2	3	4	5	6	7	8	9	10	11	12	13	14	15	16	17	18	19	20	21	22	23	24	25	26	27	28	29	30	31	32	33
Ground	A	H	A	H	A	H	A	H	A	H	A	H	A	H	A	H	A	H	A	H	A	H	A	H	A	H	A	H	A	H	A	H	A
Result	L	W	L	L	L	W	L	W	D	D	L	D	W	D	L	W	L	D	L	D	L	W	L	W	D	D	D	L	L	D	L	W	D
Position	12	4	7	10	12	7	9	7	8	8	9	9	6	8	8	8	8	8	10	10	10	9	11	9	10	10	10	10	10	11	11	10	10

Source: Matches
A = Away; H = Home; W = Win; D = Draw; L = Loss

==== Matches ====
31 July 2022 1	Paks	2–0	Fehérvár	Paks
18:00 CEST (UTC+2)	Varga 41'; Windecker 51'	Report		Stadium: Fehérvári úti Stadion; Attendance: 2,511; Referee: Tamás Bognár

7 August 2022 2	Fehérvár	4–0	Budapest Honvéd	Székesfehérvár
20:00 CEST (UTC+2)	Dárdai 30'; Kodro 34'; Bamgboye 72'; Zivzivadze 83'	Report		Stadium: MOL Aréna Sóstó; Attendance: 3,517; Referee: István Vad

14 August 2022 3	Ferencváros	4–0	Fehérvár	Budapest
20:00 CEST (UTC+2)	Auzqui 15'; Mercier 38'; Traoré 47'; Boli 90+1'	Report		Stadium: Groupama Arena; Attendance: 9,795; Referee: Balázs Berke

22 August 2022 4	Fehérvár	0–1	Újpest	Székesfehérvár
19:00 CEST (UTC+2)		Report	Pauljević 80'	Stadium: MOL Aréna Sóstó; Attendance: 2,347; Referee: Ádám Farkas

28 August 2022 5	Kisvárda	3–1	Fehérvár	Kisvárda
14:30 CEST (UTC+2)	Camaj 51'; Makowski 55'; Mešanović 63'	Report	Kodro 70' (pen.)	Stadium: Várkerti Stadion; Attendance: 2,340; Referee: Tamás Bognár

31 August 2022 6	Fehérvár	2–1	Kecskemét	Székesfehérvár
19:30 CEST (UTC+2)	Négo 31'; Stopira 90+1'	Report	B. Katona 40'	Stadium: MOL Aréna Sóstó; Attendance: 2,046; Referee: Ádám Farkas

3 September 2022 7	Debrecen	1–0	Fehérvár	Debrecen
18:15 CEST (UTC+2)	Babunski 45+2'	Report		Stadium: Nagyerdei Stadion; Attendance: 5,014; Referee: Ferenc Karakó

10 September 2022 8	Fehérvár	2–1	Mezőkövesd	Székesfehérvár
20:00 CEST (UTC+2)	Kodro 25', 81'	Report	Dražić 49'	Stadium: MOL Aréna Sóstó; Attendance: 2,376; Referee: Gergő Bogár

2 October 2022 9	Puskás Akadémia	1–1	Fehérvár	Felcsút
18:45 CEST (UTC+2)	Zahedi 57'	Report	Kodro 78'	Stadium: Pancho Aréna; Attendance: 1,680; Referee: Tamás Bognár

7 October 2022 10	Fehérvár	1–1	Zalaegerszeg	Székesfehérvár
18:00 CEST (UTC+2)	Kodro 45+1'	Report	Ikoba 90+5'	Stadium: MOL Aréna Sóstó; Attendance: 2,474; Referee: Bence Csonka

15 October 2022 11	Vasas	2–0	Fehérvár	Budapest
19:30 CEST (UTC+2)	Novothny 36'; Ihrig-Farkas 83'	Report	Serafimov (red card) 71'	Stadium: Illovszky Rudolf Stadion; Attendance: 2,027; Referee: Balázs Berke

22 October 2022 12	Fehérvár	1–1	Paks	Székesfehérvár
16:30 CEST (UTC+2)	Bamgboye 44'	Report	Szélpál 90+3'	Stadium: MOL Aréna Sóstó; Attendance: 1,979; Referee: Ferenc Karakó

29 October 2022 13	Budapest Honvéd	0–1	Fehérvár	Budapest
14:15 CEST (UTC+2)		Report	Kodro 13'	Stadium: Bozsik Aréna; Attendance: 3,407; Referee: József Erdős

6 November 2022 14	Fehérvár	2–2	Ferencváros	Székesfehérvár
20:00 CET (UTC+1)	Kastrati 52'; Dárdai 89'	Report	R. Mmaee 14' (pen.), 58'	Stadium: MOL Aréna Sóstó; Attendance: 6,121; Referee: Tamás Bognár

9 November 2022 15	Újpest	2–1	Fehérvár	Budapest
20:00 CET (UTC+1)	Csoboth 8'; Szabó 58'	Report	Serafimov 66'; Bamgboye (red card) 90+4'	Stadium: Szusza Ferenc Stadion; Attendance: 2,038; Referee: Csaba Pintér

13 November 2022 16	Fehérvár	4–1	Kisvárda	Székesfehérvár
13:30 CET (UTC+1)	Schön 25', 31'; Kastrati 65'; Dárdai 88'	Report	Makowski 62'; Karabelyov (red card) 90+2'	Stadium: MOL Aréna Sóstó; Attendance: 2,552; Referee: József Erdős

29 January 2023 17	Kecskemét	2–1	Fehérvár	Kecskemét
17:30 CET (UTC+1)	Nagy 33'; Szuhodovszki 79'	Report	Larsen 35'	Stadium: Széktói Stadion; Attendance: 2,412; Referee: Csaba Pintér

4 February 2023 18	Fehérvár	1–1	Debrecen	Székesfehérvár
19:30 CET (UTC+1)	Kodro 52'	Report	Babunski 35'	Stadium: MOL Aréna Sóstó; Attendance: 1,689; Referee: József Erdős

10 February 2023 19	Mezőkövesd	2–1	Fehérvár	Mezőkövesd
20:00 CET (UTC+1)	Beširović 35'; Dražić 90+3' (pen.)	Report	Kastrati 34'; Serafimov (red card) 90+2'	Stadium: Városi Stadion; Attendance: 1,419; Referee: Balázs Berke

18 February 2023 20	Fehérvár	1–1	Puskás Akadémia	Székesfehérvár
19:30 CET (UTC+1)	Csongvai 54'; Kastrati (red card) 90+4'	Report	Levi 82'	Stadium: MOL Aréna Sóstó; Attendance: 2,471; Referee: István Vad

25 February 2023 21	Zalaegerszeg	2–1	Fehérvár	Zalaegerszeg
14:30 CET (UTC+1)	Csóka 32'; Szalay 55'	Report	Katona 4'	Stadium: ZTE Arena; Attendance: 2,107; Referee: Ádám Farkas

4 March 2023 22	Fehérvár	2–1	Vasas	Székesfehérvár
20:15 CET (UTC+1)	Schön 15'; Kodro 78'	Report	Urblík 28'	Stadium: MOL Aréna Sóstó; Attendance: 2,563; Referee: József Erdős

11 March 2023 23	Paks	2–1	Fehérvár	Paks
17:00 CET (UTC+1)	Varga 30', 56' (pen.)	Report	Schön 45+1'	Stadium: Fehérvári úti Stadion; Attendance: 1,785; Referee: Balázs Berke

18 March 2023 24	Fehérvár	2–0	Budapest Honvéd	Székesfehérvár
19:45 CET (UTC+1)	Katona 34'; Kodro 90' (pen.)	Report		Stadium: MOL Aréna Sóstó; Attendance: 3,683; Referee: Ferenc Karakó

2 April 2023 25	Ferencváros	2–2	Fehérvár	Budapest
16:30 CEST (UTC+2)	Botka (yellow card) 27'; Kovačević (yellow card) 40'; Lisztes 59', 70'; Bogdán (yellow card) 64'	Report	Stopira 7', (yellow card) 76'; Dárdai (yellow card) 10'; Makarenko 79'; Négo (yellow card) 90+3'	Stadium: Groupama Arena; Attendance: 12,079; Referee: Gergő Bogár
Note: Bogdán was not on the pitch.

8 April 2023 26	Fehérvár	0–0	Újpest	Székesfehérvár
17:00 CEST (UTC+2)	Kodro (yellow card) 21'; Csongvai (yellow card) 27'	Report	Hall (yellow card) 9'	Stadium: MOL Aréna Sóstó; Attendance: 4,953; Referee: Csaba Pintér

16 April 2023 27	Kisvárda	0–0	Fehérvár	Kisvárda
15:30 CEST (UTC+2)	Mešanović (yellow card) 55'; Leoni (yellow card) 65'; Karabelyov (yellow card) 83'	Report		Stadium: Várkerti Stadion; Attendance: 2,010; Referee: Ádám Farkas

22 April 2023 28	Fehérvár	1–2	Kecskemét	Székesfehérvár
15:00 CEST (UTC+2)	Stopira (yellow card) 39'; Heister (yellow card) 54'; Katona (yellow card) 77'; Kodro 90+3'	Report	Nagy 33', (yellow card) 50'; Banó-Szabó (yellow card) 39'; Horváth 40'; B. Tóth (yellow card) 58'	Stadium: MOL Aréna Sóstó; Attendance: 4,246; Referee: Gergő Bogár

30 April 2023 29	Debrecen	2–0	Fehérvár	Debrecen
15:30 CEST (UTC+2)	Babunski 52'; Drešković (yellow card) 55'; Kusnyír (yellow card) 67'; Lončar (yellow card) 74'; Bódi 81'	Report	Makarenko (yellow card) 5'; Pokorný (yellow card) 74'; Larsen (red card) 85'; Szabó (yellow card) 90+1'	Stadium: Nagyerdei Stadion; Attendance: 6,561; Referee: Ferenc Karakó

7 May 2023 30	Fehérvár	1–1	Mezőkövesd	Székesfehérvár
19:30 CEST (UTC+2)	Heister (yellow card) 2'; Dárdai 25'; Négo (yellow card) 59'; Csongvai (yellow card) 87'; Szabó (yellow card) 90+5'	Report	Brtan (yellow card) 13'; Vayda 47', (yellow card) 82'; Beširović (yellow card) 72'	Stadium: MOL Aréna Sóstó; Attendance: 2,562; Referee: Ádám Farkas

14 May 2023 31	Puskás Akadémia	2–1	Fehérvár	Felcsút
18:00 CEST (UTC+2)	Gruber 52'; Komáromi (yellow card) 55', (goal) 84'; Zahedi (red card) 79'; Favorov (yellow card) 90+6'	Report	Flores (yellow card) 40'; Pokorný (yellow card) 57'; Dárdai 72'; Larsen (red card) 90+3'	Stadium: Pancho Aréna; Attendance: 2,420; Referee: István Vad

20 May 2023 32	Fehérvár	3–0	Zalaegerszeg	Székesfehérvár
14:10 CEST (UTC+2)	Kodro 3' (pen.), 49'; Kastrati 39'	Report	Kálnoki-Kis (yellow card) 30'; Kovács (yellow card) 40'; Szalay (yellow card) 42'; Huszti (yellow card) 75'; Mim (yellow card) 78'	Stadium: MOL Aréna Sóstó; Attendance: 6,237; Referee: Csaba Pintér

27 May 2023 33	Vasas	0–0	Fehérvár	Budapest
20:00 CEST (UTC+2)	Novothny (yellow card) 45'; Ódor (yellow card) 51'; Berecz (yellow card) 54'	Report	Flores (yellow card) 11'; Schön (yellow card) 39'	Stadium: Illovszky Rudolf Stadion; Attendance: 2,305; Referee: Balázs Berke

=== Magyar Kupa ===
18 September 2022 Round of 64	III. Kerület	2–5	Fehérvár	Budapest
15:00 CEST (UTC+2)	Opavszky 2'; Elek 56'	Report	Kodro 43'; Stopira 59'; Heister 63'; Bumba 71'; Makarenko 88'	Stadium: Hévízi úti Stadion; Attendance: 800; Referee: Attila Molnár

19 October 2022 Round of 32	Fehérvár	0–1	Puskás Akadémia	Székesfehérvár
20:00 CEST (UTC+2)		Report	Puljić 24'	Stadium: MOL Aréna Sóstó; Attendance: 1,425; Referee: Sándor Andó-Szabó

=== UEFA Europa Conference League ===
==== Second qualifying round ====
21 July 2022 First leg	Fehérvár (Hungary)	4–1	(Azerbaijan) Gabala	Székesfehérvár, Hungary
19:00 CEST (UTC+2)	Kodro 30', 74'; Petryak (yellow card) 60'; Rus 67'; Zivzivadze 90'	Report	Utzig 16'; Isayev (yellow card) 45'; Musayev (yellow card) 68' (yellow-red card) 86'; Safarov (yellow card) 88'	Stadium: MOL Aréna Sóstó; Attendance: 4,750; Referee: Kaspar Sjöberg (Sweden)

28 July 2022 Second leg	Gabala (Azerbaijan)	2–1 (3–5 agg.)	(Hungary) Fehérvár	Qabala, Azerbaijan
20:00 AZT (UTC+4)	Alimi (yellow card) 10'; Muradov 34', (yellow card) 69'; Ruan (yellow card) 55'; Felipe 73'; Qirtimov (yellow card) 74'	Report	Fiola (yellow card) 35'; Zivzivadze 44'; Stopira (yellow card) 57'; Négo (yellow card) 80'; Shabanov (yellow card) 90+4'	Stadium: Gabala City Stadium; Attendance: 1,800; Referee: Christopher Jäger (Austria)
Note: Fehérvár won 5–3 on aggregate.

==== Third qualifying round ====
4 August 2022 First leg	Fehérvár (Hungary)	5–0	(Moldova) Petrocub Hîncești	Székesfehérvár, Hungary
20:55 CEST (UTC+2)	Dárdai 20'; Kodro 23' (pen.); Stopira 35'; Shabanov (yellow card) 55'; Petryak 66', (yellow card) 66'; Kojnok (yellow card) 83'; Zivzivadze 88' (pen.)	Report	Avram (yellow card) 22'; Jardan (yellow card) 40'; Cotogoi (yellow card) 45+3'; Revenco (yellow card) 88'	Stadium: MOL Aréna Sóstó; Attendance: 3,365; Referee: Vilhjálmur Alvar Þórarinsson (Iceland)

11 August 2022 Second leg	Petrocub Hîncești (Moldova)	1–2 (1–7 agg.)	(Hungary) Fehérvár	Chișinău, Moldova
20:00 EEST (UTC+3)	Jardan (yellow card) 9'; Sandu 34' (pen.); Cotogoi (yellow card) 55'; Fedorov (yellow card) 89'	Report	Zivzivadze 31', 39'; Pokorný (yellow card) 32'	Stadium: Zimbru Stadium; Attendance: 4,702; Referee: Jérôme Brisard (France)
Note: Fehérvár won 7–1 on aggregate.

==== Play-off round ====
18 August 2022 First leg	Köln (Germany)	1–2	(Hungary) Fehérvár	Cologne, Germany
20:30 CEST (UTC+2)	Dietz 14'; Chabot (red card) 20'; Skhiri (yellow card) 68'; Hector (yellow card) 90+5'	Report	Larsen (yellow card) 24'; Zivzivadze 32', (yellow card) 85'; Dárdai 40', (yellow card) 69'; Hangya (yellow card) 55'; Fiola (yellow card) 58'	Stadium: RheinEnergieStadion; Attendance: 44,000; Referee: Tiago Martina (Portugal)

25 August 2022 Second leg	Fehérvár (Hungary)	0–3 (2–4 agg.)	(Germany) Köln	Székesfehérvár, Hungary
19:00 CEST (UTC+2)	Zivzivadze (yellow card) 66'; Heister (yellow card) 68'; Lyednyev (yellow card) 89'	Report	Hübers 10'; Ljubičić (yellow card) 45+1'; Skhiri 46'; Kilian (yellow card) 60'; Hector (yellow card) 89'; Schindler 90+4', (yellow card) 90+4'	Stadium: MOL Aréna Sóstó; Attendance: 10,411; Referee: Ali Palabıyık (Turkey)
Note: Köln won 4–2 on aggregate.

== Statistics ==
=== Appearances and goals ===
Last updated on 19 March 2023.

No.	Pos	Nat	Player	Total		Nemzeti Bajnokság I		UEFA Europa Conference League		Magyar Kupa	
No.	Pos	Nat	Player	Apps	Goals	Apps	Goals	Apps	Goals	Apps	Goals
1	GK	(Hungary) HUN	Dániel Kovács	29	-40	23	-32	5	-7	1	-1
3	DF	(Denmark) DEN	Kasper Larsen	17	1	15	1	2	0	0	0
5	DF	(Hungary) HUN	Attila Fiola	28	0	21	0	6	0	1	0
6	MF	(Slovakia) SVK	Peter Pokorný	20	0	16	0	3	0	1	0
7	MF	(Hungary) HUN	Szabolcs Schön	18	4	17	4	0	0	1	0
8	MF	(Ukraine) UKR	Yevhenii Makarenko	14	1	8	0	4	0	2	1
10	MF	(Kosovo) KOS	Lirim Kastrati	17	3	16	3	0	0	1	0
11	DF	(Hungary) HUN	Loïc Négo	27	1	19	1	6	0	2	0
12	MF	(Honduras) HON	Deiby Flores	8	0	8	0	0	0	0	0
13	MF	(Ukraine) UKR	Artem Shabanov	11	0	5	0	5	0	1	0
14	MF	(Hungary) HUN	Áron Csongvai	5	1	5	1	0	0	0	0
19	FW	(Bosnia and Herzegovina) BIH	Kenan Kodro	31	14	24	10	5	3	2	1
20	MF	(Norway) NOR	Tobias Christensen	6	0	6	0	0	0	0	0
21	MF	(Portugal) POR	Rúben Pinto	16	0	10	0	5	0	1	0
22	DF	(Cape Verde) CPV	Stopira	23	3	16	1	5	1	2	1
23	FW	(Hungary) HUN	Palkó Dárdai	26	5	20	3	6	2	0	0
27	FW	(Hungary) HUN	Levente Szabó	3	0	3	0	0	0	0	0
29	DF	(Hungary) HUN	Zsolt Kojnok	3	0	0	0	3	0	0	0
31	DF	(North Macedonia) MKD	Nikola Serafimov	14	1	11	1	2	0	1	0
33	DF	(Hungary) HUN	Barnabás Bese	10	0	10	0	0	0	0	0
42	GK	(Serbia) SRB	Emil Rockov	3	-4	1	-1	1	-1	1	-2
55	DF	(Germany) GER	Marcel Heister	26	1	19	0	5	0	2	1
65	DF	(Hungary) HUN	Szilveszter Hangya	16	0	10	0	5	0	1	0
77	MF	(Hungary) HUN	Mátyás Katona	5	2	5	2	0	0	0	0
82	FW	(Hungary) HUN	Zsombor Menyhárt	2	0	2	0	0	0	0	0
94	MF	(Romania) ROU	Claudiu Bumba	17	1	11	0	4	0	2	1
95	MF	(Brazil) BRA	Alef	2	0	2	0	0	0	0	0
96	MF	(France) FRA	Lyes Houri	14	0	12	0	0	0	2	0
Youth players:
57	GK	(Hungary) HUN	Martin Dala	0	0	0	-0	0	-0	0	-0
81	MF	(Slovakia) SVK	Bence Kovács	1	0	1	0	0	0	0	0
83	FW	(Hungary) HUN	Bence Babos	1	0	1	0	0	0	0	0
88	MF	(Hungary) HUN	Milán Pető	1	0	1	0	0	0	0	0
Out to loan:
Players no longer at the club:
4	DF	(Romania) ROU	Adrian Rus	1	1	0	0	1	1	0	0
7	FW	(Ukraine) UKR	Ivan Petryak	6	1	3	0	3	1	0	0
9	FW	(Georgia (country)) GEO	Budu Zivzivadze	17	7	10	1	6	6	1	0
14	FW	(Hungary) HUN	Ákos Szendrei	4	0	3	0	0	0	1	0
26	DF	(Czech Republic) CZE	Michael Lüftner	2	0	0	0	2	0	0	0
70	FW	(Nigeria) NGR	Funsho Bamgboye	18	2	11	2	6	0	1	0
77	MF	(Hungary) HUN	Kevin Csoboth	0	0	0	0	0	0	0	0
80	MF	(Ukraine) UKR	Bohdan Lyednyev	13	0	8	0	3	0	2	0

=== Top scorers ===
Includes all competitive matches. The list is sorted by shirt number when total goals are equal.

Last updated on 19 March 2023

Position	Nation	Number	Name	Nemzeti Bajnokság I	UEFA Europa Conference League	Magyar Kupa	Total
1	(Bosnia and Herzegovina)	19	Kenan Kodro	10	3	1	14
2	(Georgia (country))	9	Budu Zivzivadze	1	6	0	7
3	(Hungary)	23	Palkó Dárdai	3	2	0	5
4	(Hungary)	7	Szabolcs Schön	4	0	0	4
5	(Kosovo)	10	Lirim Kastrati	3	0	0	3
5	(Cape Verde)	22	Stopira	1	1	1	3
7	(Nigeria)	70	Funsho Bamgboye	2	0	0	2
7	(Hungary)	77	Mátyás Katona	2	0	0	2
9	(Denmark)	3	Kasper Larsen	1	0	0	1
9	(Romania)	4	Adrian Rus	0	1	0	1
9	(Ukraine)	7	Ivan Petryak	0	1	0	1
9	(Ukraine)	8	Yevhenii Makarenko	0	0	1	1
9	(Hungary)	11	Loïc Négo	1	0	0	1
9	(Hungary)	14	Áron Csongvai	1	0	0	1
9	(North Macedonia)	31	Nikola Serafimov	1	0	0	1
9	(Germany)	55	Marcel Heister	0	0	1	1
9	(Romania)	94	Claudiu Bumba	0	0	1	1
/	/	/	Own Goals	0	0	0	0
			TOTALS	30	14	5	49

=== Disciplinary record ===
Includes all competitive matches. Players with 1 card or more included only.

Last updated on 19 March 2023

Position	Nation	Number	Name	Nemzeti Bajnokság I		UEFA Europa Conference League		Magyar Kupa		Total (Hu Total)	
Position	Nation	Number	Name	Yellow card	Red card	Yellow card	Red card	Yellow card	Red card	Yellow card	Red card
GK	(Hungary)	1	Dániel Kovács	1	0	0	0	0	0	1 (1)	0 (0)
DF	(Denmark)	3	Kasper Larsen	1	0	1	0	0	0	2 (1)	0 (0)
DF	(Hungary)	5	Attila Fiola	5	0	2	0	0	0	7 (5)	0 (0)
MF	(Slovakia)	6	Peter Pokorný	3	0	1	0	0	0	4 (3)	0 (0)
MF	(Hungary)	7	Szabolcs Schön	2	0	0	0	0	0	2 (2)	0 (0)
MF	(Ukraine)	7	Ivan Petryak	0	0	2	0	0	0	2 (0)	0 (0)
MF	(Ukraine)	8	Yevhenii Makarenko	1	0	0	0	0	0	1 (1)	0 (0)
FW	(Georgia (country))	9	Budu Zivzivadze	0	0	2	0	0	0	2 (0)	0 (0)
MF	(Kosovo)	10	Lirim Kastrati	4	1	0	0	0	0	4 (4)	1 (1)
DF	(Hungary)	11	Loïc Négo	1	0	1	0	1	0	3 (1)	0 (0)
MF	(Honduras)	12	Deiby Flores	2	0	0	0	0	0	2 (2)	0 (0)
MF	(Ukraine)	13	Artem Shabanov	0	0	2	0	0	0	2 (0)	0 (0)
FW	(Bosnia and Herzegovina)	19	Kenan Kodro	3	0	0	0	0	0	3 (3)	0 (0)
MF	(Norway)	20	Tobias Christensen	1	0	0	0	0	0	1 (1)	0 (0)
MF	(Portugal)	21	Rúben Pinto	3	0	0	0	0	0	3 (3)	0 (0)
DF	(Cape Verde)	22	Stopira	5	0	1	0	0	0	6 (5)	0 (0)
MF	(Hungary)	23	Palkó Dárdai	1	0	1	0	0	0	2 (1)	0 (0)
DF	(Hungary)	29	Zsolt Kojnok	0	0	1	0	0	0	1 (0)	0 (0)
DF	(North Macedonia)	31	Nikola Serafimov	2	2	0	0	0	0	2 (2)	2 (2)
GK	(Serbia)	42	Emil Rockov	1	0	0	0	0	0	1 (1)	0 (0)
DF	(Germany)	55	Marcel Heister	4	0	1	0	0	0	5 (4)	0 (0)
DF	(Hungary)	65	Szilveszter Hangya	5	0	1	0	0	0	6 (5)	0 (0)
MF	(Nigeria)	70	Funsho Bamgboye	1	1	0	0	0	0	1 (1)	1 (1)
MF	(Hungary)	77	Mátyás Katona	2	0	0	0	0	0	2 (2)	0 (0)
MF	(Ukraine)	80	Bohdan Lyednyev	0	0	1	0	0	0	1 (0)	0 (0)
MF	(Hungary)	82	Zsombor Menyhárt	1	0	0	0	0	0	1 (1)	0 (0)
MF	(Brazil)	95	Alef	1	0	0	0	0	0	1 (1)	0 (0)
MF	(France)	96	Lyes Houri	3	0	0	0	1	0	4 (3)	0 (0)
			TOTALS	53	4	17	0	2	0	72 (53)	4 (4)

=== Clean sheets ===
Last updated on 9 April 2023

Position	Nation	Number	Name	Nemzeti Bajnokság I	UEFA Europa Conference League	Magyar Kupa	Total
1	(Hungary)	1	Dániel Kovács	4	1	0	5
2	(Serbia)	42	Emil Rockov	0	0	0	0
3	(Hungary)	57	Martin Dala	0	0	0	0
			TOTALS	4	1	0	5
