= Áron Csongvai =

Hungarian footballer (born 2000)

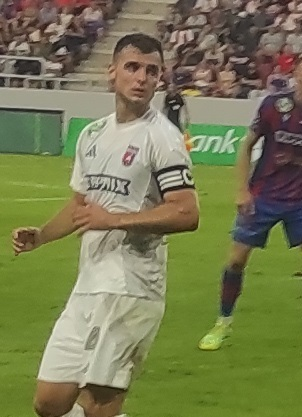
- Csongvai with Fehérvár in 2024

Personal information
- Date of birth: 31 October 2000 (age 26)
- Place of birth: Budapest, Hungary
- Height: 1.86 m (6 ft 1 in)
- Position: Defensive midfielder Centre-back

Team information
- Current team: Saint-Étienne
- Number: 33

Youth career
- 2007–2016: Vasas
- 2016–2019: Újpest

Senior career*
Years	Team	Apps	(Gls)
2018–2023	Újpest II	38	(12)
2020–2023	Újpest	87	(5)
2019	→ Vác (loan)	1	(0)
2023–2025	Fehérvár	56	(4)
2025–2026	AIK Fotboll	40	(3)
2026–	Saint-Étienne	0	(0)

International career^{‡}
2021–2022	Hungary U21	8	(0)
2025–	Hungary	7	(0)
- * Club domestic league appearances and goals as of 11 July 2026 ‡ National team caps and goals as of 18 November 2026

Áron Csongvai (born 31 October 2000) is a Hungarian footballer who plays as a midfielder for French Ligue 2 club Saint-Étienne and the Hungary national team.

== Club career ==
=== Fehérvár ===
On 14 February 2023, Csongvai signed a three-year contract with Fehérvár.

=== AIK ===
On 13 February 2025, Csongvai signed with AIK Fotboll.

=== Saint-Étienne ===
On 15 July 2026, Csongvai joined Saint-Étienne in French Ligue 2 on a four-year deal.

== Career statistics ==
=== Club ===
As of 8 July 2026

Appearances and goals by club, season and competition
Club	Season	League			Cup		Continental		Other		Total	
Club	Season	Division	Apps	Goals	Apps	Goals	Apps	Goals	Apps	Goals	Apps	Goals
Újpest II	2017–18	Megyei Bajnokság I	1	0	—		—		—		1	0
Újpest II	2018–19	Megyei Bajnokság I	25	5	—		—		—		25	5
Újpest II	2019–20	Megyei Bajnokság I	12	7	—		—		—		12	7
Újpest II	Total		38	12	0	0	0	0	0	0	38	12
Vác	2019–20	Nemzeti Bajnokság II	1	0	0	0	0	0	—		1	0
Vác	Total		1	0	0	0	0	0	0	0	1	0
Újpest	2019–20	Nemzeti Bajnokság I	10	0	3	1	0	0	—		13	1
Újpest	2020–21	Nemzeti Bajnokság I	28	2	4	1	0	0	—		32	3
Újpest	2021–22	Nemzeti Bajnokság I	31	2	4	1	3 (Note: Appearances in UEFA Conference League)	0	—		38	3
Újpest	2022–23	Nemzeti Bajnokság I	18	1	3	2	—		—		21	3
Újpest	Total		87	3	14	5	3	0	0	0	104	10
Fehérvár	2022–23	Nemzeti Bajnokság I	12	1	—		—		—		12	1
Fehérvár	2023–24	Nemzeti Bajnokság I	30	2	1	0	—		—		31	2
Fehérvár	2024–25	Nemzeti Bajnokság I	18	1	1	0	4	0	—		23	1
Fehérvár	Total		60	4	2	0	4	0	—		66	4
AIK	2025	Allsvenskan	28	2	3	0	4	1	—		35	3
AIK	2026	Allsvenskan	11	1	4	0	0	0	—		15	1
AIK	Total		39	3	7	0	4	1	—		50	4
Career total			225	24	23	5	11	1	0	0	259	30

=== International ===
As of match played 17 November 2026

Appearances and goals by national team and year
National team	Year	Apps	Goals
Hungary	2025	2	0
Hungary	2026	5	0
Total		7	0
