= Abdoulaye Diaby =

Malian footballer (born 2000)

Personal information
- Full name: Abdoulaye Diaby
- Date of birth: 4 July 2000 (age 26)
- Place of birth: Bamako, Mali
- Height: 1.98 m (6 ft 6 in)
- Position: Centre-back

Team information
- Current team: Grasshopper Club Zurich
- Number: 15

Youth career
- –2018: Djoliba
- 2018–2019: Royal Antwerp

Senior career*
Years	Team	Apps	(Gls)
2019–2021	Royal Antwerp	0	(0)
2019–2020	→ Lokeren (loan)	9	(1)
2021–2023	Újpest	45	(5)
2023–2025	St. Gallen	41	(1)
2025–	Grasshopper	20	(0)

International career^{‡}
2017	Mali U17	9	(0)
2019	Mali U20	7	(1)
2024–	Mali	8	(0)
- * Club domestic league appearances and goals as of 28 September 2026 ‡ National team caps and goals as of 8 October 2025

Abdoulaye Diaby (born 4 July 2000) is a Malian professional footballer who plays as a centre-back for Swiss Super League club Grasshopper Club Zurich and the Mali national team.

== Club career ==
Diaby began his career as a youth at Djoliba AC before moving to Belgium at the age of 19. He was loaned to Lokeren in 2019.

On 21 June 2021, Diaby signed with Újpest in Hungary.

On 25 June 2023, Diaby signed for Swiss Super League club St. Gallen on a two-year contract. He departed St. Gallen on 9 June 2025 at the end of his contract.

On 5 September 2025, he signed with league rivals Grasshopper Club Zurich. He joins them on a two-year deal, with an option for a further year. He was able to celebrate a 3–1 victory at home against FC Lausanne-Sport on his debut, on 14 September 2025. He came on after just 30 minutes, replacing the injured captain Saulo Decarli.

== International career ==
Diaby has played for Mali at the U17 and U20 level.

On 11 December 2025, he was included in Mali's squad for the 2025 Africa Cup of Nations.

== Career statistics ==
=== Club ===
As of 4 October 2025

Appearances and goals by club, season and competition
Club	Season	League			Cup		Continental		Other		Total	
Club	Season	Division	Apps	Goals	Apps	Goals	Apps	Goals	Apps	Goals	Apps	Goals
Royal Antwerp	2019–20	Belgian First Division A	0	0	0	0	0	0	0	0	0	0
Lokeren (loan)	2019–20	Belgian First Division B	9	1	1 (Note: Appearances in the Belgian Cup)	0	–		0	0	10	1
Újpest	2021–22	Nemzeti Bajnokság I	20	1	3	2	4 (Note: Appearances in UEFA Europa Conference League)	0	–		27	3
Újpest	2022–23	Nemzeti Bajnokság I	25	4	3	0	–		0	0	28	4
Újpest	Total		45	5	6	2	4	0	0	0	55	7
St. Gallen	2023–24	Swiss Super League	24	0	2	1	–		–		26	1
St. Gallen	2024–25	Swiss Super League	17	1	1	0	6	0	–		24	1
St. Gallen	Total		41	1	3	1	6	0	–		50	2
Grasshopper	2025–26	Swiss Super League	3	0	1	0	–		–		4	0
Career total			98	7	11	3	10	0	0	0	119	10

=== International ===
As of match played 8 October 2025

Appearances and goals by national team and year
National team	Year	Apps	Goals
Mali	2024	5	0
Mali	2025	3	0
Total		8	0
