= Nemanja Antonov =

Serbian professional footballer

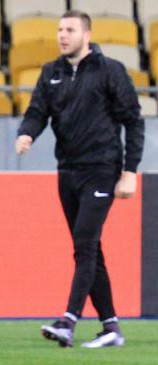
- Antonov with Partizan in 2017

Personal information
- Date of birth: 6 May 1995 (age 31)
- Place of birth: Pančevo, FR Yugoslavia
- Height: 1.82 m (5 ft 11 1/2 in)
- Position: Left back

Team information
- Current team: Nyíregyháza
- Number: 7

Youth career
- AS Kačarevo
- OFK Beograd

Senior career*
Years	Team	Apps	(Gls)
2013–2015	OFK Beograd	41	(0)
2015–2018	Grasshoppers	50	(0)
2017–2018	→ Partizan (loan)	11	(0)
2019–2020	Excel Mouscron	31	(3)
2020–2023	Újpest	87	(8)
2023–2025	MTK Budapest	42	(3)
2025–	Nyíregyháza	28	(1)

International career
2013–2014	Serbia U19	6	(0)
2014–2015	Serbia U20	12	(0)
2015–2017	Serbia U21	15	(0)
Medal record
Gold medal – first place	FIFA U-20 World Cup	2015
- * Club domestic league appearances and goals as of 30 May 2026

Nemanja Antonov (Serbian Cyrillic: Немања Антонов; born 6 May 1995) is a Serbian professional footballer who plays for Hungarian club Nyíregyháza Spartacus as a left-back.

== Club career ==
Born in Pančevo, Antonov originating from the local neighbourhood Kačarevo, where he grown up. He started out at OFK Beograd, making his senior debuts in the 2012–13 season. He remained with the club for two more seasons, before transferring to Swiss club Grasshoppers in July 2015.

On 30 August 2017, Antonov was transferred to Partizan on a season-long loan.

On 25 September 2020, he joined Újpest in Hungary.

On 3 June 2023, it was announced that from the upcoming 2023-24 season, Antonov will join newly promoted OTP Bank Liga club MTK Budapest.

On 30 June 2025, Antonov signed to Nyíregyháza Spartacus in Hungary.

== International career ==
Antonov represented Serbia at the 2014 UEFA Under-19 Championship, as the team was eliminated in the semi-final by Portugal. He was also a member of the team that won the 2015 FIFA U-20 World Cup.

Subsequently, Antonov was a member of the team at the 2017 UEFA European Under-21 Championship.

== Statistics ==
As of end of 2021–22 season

Club	Season	League		Cup		Continental		Other		Total	
Club	Season	Apps	Goals	Apps	Goals	Apps	Goals	Apps	Goals	Apps	Goals
OFK Beograd	2012–13	1	0	0	0	—		—		1	0
OFK Beograd	2013–14	16	0	3	0	—		—		19	0
OFK Beograd	2014–15	24	0	2	0	—		—		26	0
OFK Beograd	Total	41	0	5	0	—		—		46	0
Grasshoppers	2015–16	21	0	2	0	—		—		23	0
Grasshoppers	2016–17	28	0	2	0	2	0	—		32	0
Grasshoppers	2017–18	1	0	0	0	—		—		1	0
Grasshoppers	Total	50	0	4	0	2	0	—		56	0
Partizan (loan)	2017–18	11	0	3	1	0	0	—		14	1
Mouscron	2018–19	3	1	0	0	—		9 (Note: Appearance in Europa League play-offs)	0	12	1
Mouscron	2019–20	17	2	1	0	—		0	0	18	2
Mouscron	2020–21	2	0	0	0	—		0	0	2	0
Mouscron	Total	22	3	1	0	0	0	9	0	32	3
Újpest	2020–21	27	4	7	0	—		—		34	4
Újpest	2021–22	32	1	5	0	4	0	—		41	1
Újpest	Total	59	5	12	0	4	0	—		75	5
Career total		183	8	25	1	6	0	9	0	223	9

== Honours ==
=== Club ===
Partizan

- Serbian Cup: 2017–18

Újpest

- Magyar Kupa: 2020–21

=== International ===
Serbia

- FIFA U-20 World Cup: 2015
