= Fernand Gouré =

Ivorian footballer

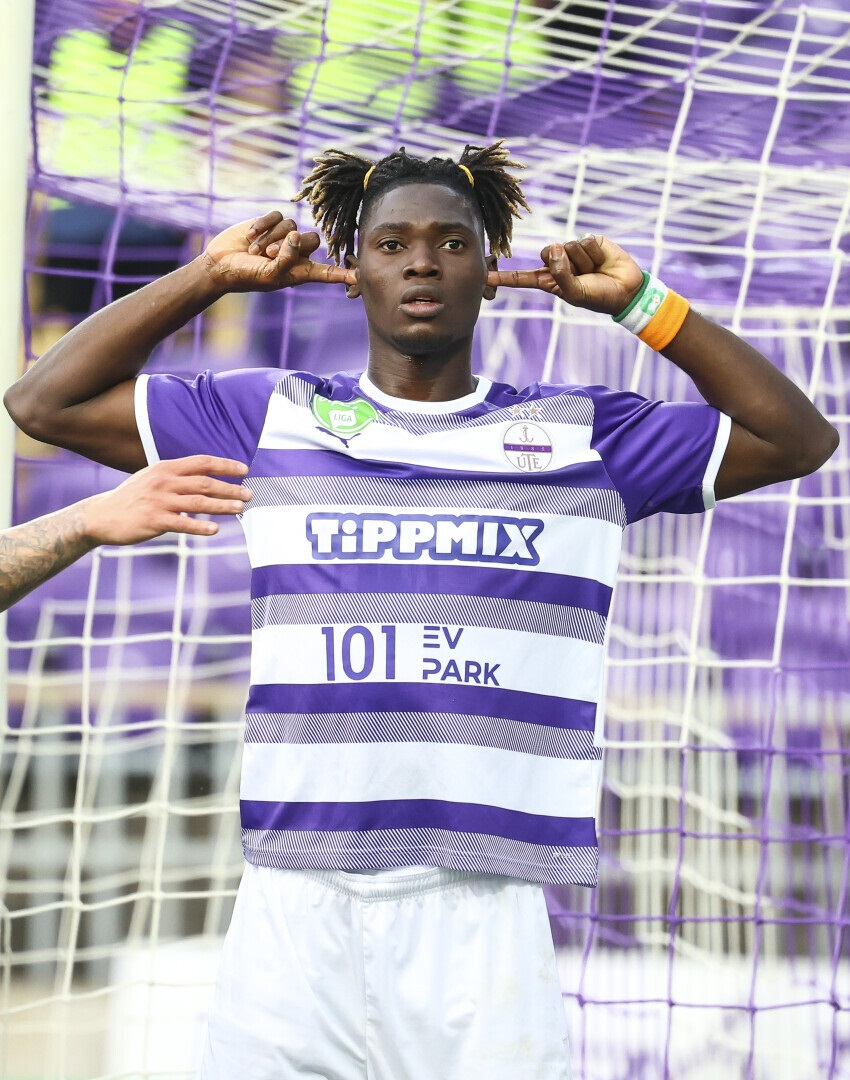
- Gouré playing for Újpest in 2023

Personal information
- Full name: Bi Irié Fernand Gouré
- Date of birth: 12 April 2002 (age 24)
- Place of birth: Yamoussoukro, Ivory Coast
- Height: 1.89 m (6 ft 2 in)
- Position: Forward

Team information
- Current team: Radomiak Radom
- Number: 11

Youth career
- AS Denguélé

Senior career*
Years	Team	Apps	(Gls)
2021	Maccabi Netanya	13	(2)
2021–2026	Westerlo	32	(1)
2022–2023	→ Újpest (loan)	24	(8)
2023–2024	→ DAC Dunajská Streda (loan)	20	(3)
2024–2025	→ Zürich (loan)	3	(0)
2026–	Radomiak Radom	0	(0)

International career
2020	Ivory Coast U20	1	(0)
- * Club domestic league appearances and goals as of 1 June 2026

Bi Irié Fernand Gouré (born 12 April 2002) is an Ivorian professional footballer who plays as a forward for Ekstraklasa club Radomiak Radom.

== Club career ==
On 25 August 2022, Gouré joined Újpest in Hungary on loan.

On 7 September 2023, Gouré moved on a new loan to DAC Dunajská Streda in Slovakia. On 3 July 2024, he was loaned by Zürich in Switzerland.

On 23 June 2026, Gouré signed with Polish Ekstraklasa club Radomiak Radom on a three-year contract.

== International career ==
In June 2023, he took part in the Maurice Revello Tournament in France with Ivory Coast.

== Honours ==
Westerlo

- Belgian First Division B: 2021–22
