= Kevin Csoboth =

Hungarian footballer (born 2000)

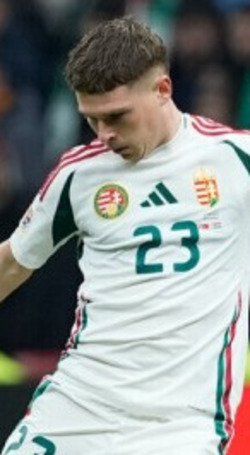
- Csoboth in March 2025

Personal information
- Full name: Kevin Csoboth
- Date of birth: 20 June 2000 (age 26)
- Place of birth: Pécs, Hungary
- Height: 1.78 m (5 ft 10 in)
- Position: Forward

Team information
- Current team: St. Gallen

Youth career
- 2006–2007: Pécsi Góliát SE
- 2007–2014: Pécsi MFC
- 2014–2015: Főnix Gold
- 2015–2016: Ferencvárosi
- 2016–2017: Kozármisleny
- 2016–2017: → Benfica (loan)
- 2017–2019: Benfica

Senior career*
| Years | Team | Apps | (Gls) |
| 2019–2021 | Benfica B | 18 | (2) |
| 2021–2022 | Fehérvár | 1 | (0) |
| 2022 | → Szeged-Csanád (loan) | 14 | (5) |
| 2022–2024 | Újpest | 59 | (12) |
| 2024– | St. Gallen | 32 | (1) |
| 2025–2026 | → Gençlerbirliği (loan) | 5 | (0) |

International career^{‡}
| 2016 | Hungary U-16 | 5 | (3) |
| 2016–2018 | Hungary U-17 | 18 | (7) |
| 2018 | Hungary U-18 | 3 | (0) |
| 2017–2019 | Hungary U-19 | 5 | (0) |
| 2023– | Hungary | 19 | (1) |
- * Club domestic league appearances and goals as of 22 December 2025 ‡ National team caps and goals as of 10 June 2025 (UTC)

Kevin Csoboth (born 20 June 2000) is a Hungarian professional footballer who plays as a forward for Swiss Super League club St. Gallen and the Hungary national team.

== Club career ==
=== Benfica B ===
On 2 December 2019, Csoboth debuted in the S.L. Benfica B against C. D. Mafra. On 8 December, he scored his first goal for S.L. Benfica B against C.D. Feirense.

On 26 November 2020, Csoboth was named as the man of the match after scoring a goal against C. D. Cova da Piedade. On 6 January 2021, he was offered a new contract with Benfica. However, he declined the new offer and wanted to leave the club after 5 years.

=== Fehérvár ===
On 16 August 2021, he was signed by Nemzeti Bajnokság I club, Fehérvár FC.

=== Szeged-Csanád ===
On 14 February 2022, Csoboth joined Szeged-Csanád on loan until the end of the season.

=== Újpest ===
On 11 August 2022, he was signed by Nemzeti Bajnokság I club Újpest FC. On 26 August 2022, he debuted in Újpest in a 2–3 defeat in the Szusza Ferenc Stadion against Paksi FC on the 5th matchday of the 2022–23 Nemzeti Bajnokság I season. He entered the pitch on the 85th minute as a substitute for Matija Ljujić. He scored his first goal in the Magyar Kupa in the 2022–23 Magyar Kupa season in 6–1 victory against Mátészalka FC. He scored his first goal wearing the Újpest t-shirt in the 2022–23 Nemzeti Bajnokság I season against his former club Fehérvár FC at the Szusza Ferenc Stadion on 9 November 2022. The match ended with a 2–1 victory for the Budapest club. On 1 April 2022, he scored a Hat-trick against Zalaegerszeg in the 2022-23 Nemzeti Bajnokság I. After the match, Ricardo Moniz, coach of Zalaegerszeg, said that he hopes that Csoboth will go to the top at international level. On 18 May 2023, he signed a new contract with Újpest until 2027.

==== 2023–24 season ====
On 26 August 2023, he scored his first goal in the 2023–24 Nemzeti Bajnokság I season in a 2–1 victory against Zalaegerszegi TE at home in the first minute.

=== St. Gallen ===
On 11 August 2024, he debuted in a 1–0 victory in against Grasshopper Club Zurich on the fourth match day of the 2024–25 Swiss Super League season. He entered the pitch as a substitute for Christian Witzig in the 63rd minute. He scored his first goal in a 4–1 victory over FC Zürich on 24 September 2024 at the Kybunpark. On 3 October 2024, he scored a goal in a 6–2 defeat against Cercle Brugge K.S.V. in the 2024–25 UEFA Conference League league phase at the Jan Breydel Stadium, Bruges, Belgium.

Sven Lenzi said that "In fact, as a winger, he doesn't really fit into the team's style of play, and he isn't strong enough defensively for the role of a winger. On top of that, head coach Enrico Maassen isn't particularly fond of him from a soccer standpoint either."

Although Csoboth trains with the first team and lives in St. Gallen, he is not currently "integrated into the team", meaning that he plays for reserve teams, and occasionally makes appearances on the bench for first team fixtures. Thus, he mostly plays fixtures for the academy and reserve teams.

==== Gençlerbirliği (loan) ====
On 10 September 2025, Csoboth moved on loan to Gençlerbirliği in Turkey. He only made 5 late substitute appearances for the club, and on 16 January 2026, his loan was terminated early.

== International career ==
Csoboth debuted in the Hungary national team against Estonia in a friendly match on 23 March 2023, entering the pitch on the 76th minute as a substitute for Dominik Szoboszlai.

On 14 May 2024, Csoboth was named in Hungary's squad for UEFA Euro 2024. On 23 June 2024, in their last group stage match of the competition, he scored his first international goal, a winner in the tenth minute of stoppage time against Scotland. Despite knocking Scotland out of the tournament, Hungary could not also reach the knockout stage due to goal difference. However, Csoboth's goal was the latest a player had ever scored in the European Championship history (excluding extra time) at 99 minutes and 32 seconds.

== Career statistics ==
=== Club ===
As of match played 22 March 2026

Appearances and goals by club, season and competition
| Club | Season | League | | | Cup | | Other | | Total | |
| Club | Season | Division | Apps | Goals | Apps | Goals | Apps | Goals | Apps | Goals |
|---|---|---|---|---|---|---|---|---|---|---|
| Benfica B | 2018–19 | LigaPro | 1 | 0 | — | | 2 | 0 | 3 | 0 |
| Benfica B | 2019–20 | LigaPro | 5 | 1 | — | | 3 | 1 | 8 | 2 |
| Benfica B | 2020–21 | LigaPro | 12 | 1 | — | | — | | 12 | 1 |
| Benfica B | Total | | 18 | 2 | 0 | 0 | 5 | 1 | 23 | 3 |
| Fehérvár | 2021–22 | Nemzeti Bajnokság I | 1 | 0 | 2 | 2 | 0 | 0 | 3 | 2 |
| Fehérvár | 2022–23 | Nemzeti Bajnokság I | 0 | 0 | 0 | 0 | 0 | 0 | 0 | 0 |
| Fehérvár | Total | | 1 | 0 | 2 | 2 | 0 | 0 | 3 | 2 |
| Szeged (loan) | 2021–22 | Nemzeti Bajnokság II | 14 | 5 | 0 | 0 | — | | 14 | 5 |
| Újpest | 2022–23 | Nemzeti Bajnokság I | 26 | 5 | 3 | 1 | — | | 29 | 6 |
| Újpest | 2023–24 | Nemzeti Bajnokság I | 32 | 7 | 3 | 0 | — | | 35 | 7 |
| Újpest | Total | | 58 | 12 | 6 | 1 | — | | 64 | 13 |
| St. Gallen | 2024–25 | Swiss Super League | 31 | 1 | 2 | 1 | 9 (Note: Appearances in UEFA Conference League) | 2 | 42 | 4 |
| St. Gallen | 2025–26 | Swiss Super League | 1 | 0 | 0 | 0 | 0 | 0 | 1 | 0 |
| St. Gallen | Total | | 32 | 1 | 2 | 1 | 9 | 2 | 43 | 4 |
| Gençlerbirliği S.K. (loan) | 2025–26 | Süper Lig | 5 | 0 | 2 | 0 | — | | 7 | 0 |
| Career total | | | 127 | 20 | 10 | 4 | 14 | 3 | 151 | 27 |

=== International ===
As of match played on 10 June 2025

Appearances and goals by national team and year
| National team | Year | Apps | Goals |
|---|---|---|---|
| Hungary | 2023 | 7 | 0 |
| Hungary | 2024 | 8 | 1 |
| Hungary | 2025 | 4 | 0 |
| Total | | 19 | 1 |

Scores and results list Hungary's goal tally first, score column indicates score after each Csoboth goal.

List of international goals scored by Kevin Csoboth
| No. | Date | Venue | Cap | Opponent | Score | Result | Competition |
|---|---|---|---|---|---|---|---|
| 1 | 23 June 2024 | MHPArena, Stuttgart, Germany | 10 | Scotland | 1–0 | 1–0 | UEFA Euro 2024 |
