= Lirim Kastrati (footballer, born February 1999) =

Kosovan footballer

Personal information
- Date of birth: 2 February 1999 (age 27)
- Place of birth: Malishevë, FR Yugoslavia
- Height: 1.78 m (5 ft 10 in)
- Position: Right-back

Team information
- Current team: Kauno Žalgiris
- Number: 62

Youth career
- –2013: San Paolo Padova
- 2013–2018: Roma
- 2018–2020: Bologna

Senior career*
Years	Team	Apps	(Gls)
2020–2024	Újpest	82	(3)
2024–2025	Widzew Łódź	17	(0)
2026	Diósgyőr	6	(0)
2026–	Kauno Žalgiris	1	(0)

International career
2015	Albania U17	3	(1)
2018	Kosovo U19	1	(0)
2019–2020	Kosovo U21	4	(0)
2017–2023	Kosovo	15	(0)
- * Club domestic league appearances and goals as of 10 August 2026

Lirim Kastrati (born 2 February 1999), also known as Lirim R. Kastrati, is a Kosovan professional footballer who plays as a right-back for Toplyga club Kauno Žalgiris.

== Club career ==
=== Youth career ===
==== Bologna ====
On 23 July 2018, Kastrati signed a three-year contract with Campionato Primavera 2 club Bologna. On 15 September 2018, he made his debut in a 1–1 home draw against SPAL after being named in the starting line-up.

=== Újpest ===
On 22 July 2020, Kastrati signed his first professional contract with Nemzeti Bajnokság I side Újpest after agreeing to a four-year deal and receiving squad number 62. On 15 August 2020, he was named as a Újpest substitute for the first time in a Nemzeti Bajnokság I match against Paksi. His debut with Újpest came eight days later against Budafoki MTE after being named in the starting line-up, and assists in his side's only goal during a 1–1 home draw.

=== Widzew Łódź ===
On 28 January 2024, Kastrati signed a two-and-a-half-year deal with Polish Ekstraklasa club Widzew Łódź. He made his debut on 11 February, in a 1–3 loss with Jagiellonia Białystok. He terminated his contract with Widzew by mutual consent on 31 May 2025.

== International career ==
=== Albania ===
==== Under-17 ====
On 16 October 2015, Kastrati was named as part of the Albania U17 squad for 2016 UEFA European Under-17 Championship qualification. On 22 October 2015, he made his debut with Albania U17 in a match against Switzerland after being named in the starting line-up.

=== Kosovo ===
==== First call-up ====
On 21 March 2017, Kastrati received his first call-up from Kosovo U21 for a 2019 UEFA European Under-21 Championship qualification match against Republic of Ireland, he was an unused substitute in that match.

==== Promotion to the senior team ====
On 5 June 2017, Kastrati received a call-up from Kosovo for a 2018 FIFA World Cup qualification match against Turkey. On 9 October 2017, he made his debut with Kosovo in a 2018 FIFA World Cup qualification match against Iceland after coming on as a substitute at 78th minute in place of Besar Halimi.

==== Return to youth teams ====
===== Under-19 =====
On 17 March 2018, Kastrati was named as part of the Kosovo U19 squad for 2018 UEFA European Under-19 Championship elite qualifications. On 21 March 2018, he made his debut with Kosovo U19 in a match against Portugal after being named in the starting line-up.

===== Under-21 =====
On 27 May 2019, Kastrati returned to the Kosovo U21 and was called up for 2021 UEFA European Under-21 Championship qualification matches against Andorra and Turkey. On 6 June 2019, he made his under-21 debut against Andorra after being named in the starting line-up.

== Career statistics ==
=== International ===
Appearances and goals by national team and year
National team	Year	Apps	Goals
Kosovo
Kosovo	2017	2	0
Kosovo	2018	0	0
Kosovo	2019	0	0
Kosovo	2020	1	0
Kosovo	2021	2	0
Kosovo	2022	7	0
Kosovo	2023	3	0
Total		15	0

== Honours ==
Újpest

- Magyar Kupa: 2020–21

Kauno Žalgiris

- Toplyga: 2026
- Lithuanian Cup: 2026
