= Tim Hall (footballer) =

Luxembourgish footballer

Personal information
- Date of birth: 15 April 1997 (age 29)
- Place of birth: Esch-sur-Alzette, Luxembourg
- Height: 1.90 m (6 ft 3 in)
- Position: Centre-back

Team information
- Current team: UNA Strassen
- Number: 34

Youth career
- F91 Dudelange
- Standard Liège
- 2014–2016: 1. FC Saarbrücken

Senior career*
| Years | Team | Apps | (Gls) |
| 2016–2017 | SV Elversberg II | 24 | (1) |
| 2017–2018 | Lierse | 4 | (0) |
| 2018–2019 | Progrès Niederkorn | 11 | (2) |
| 2019–2020 | Karpaty Lviv | 18 | (1) |
| 2020–2021 | Gil Vicente | 1 | (0) |
| 2021 | Wisła Kraków | 0 | (0) |
| 2021–2022 | Ethnikos Achna | 21 | (0) |
| 2023–2024 | Újpest | 29 | (0) |
| 2024 | Hanoi FC | 10 | (0) |
| 2025– | UNA Strassen | 34 | (1) |

International career^{‡}
| 2013 | Luxembourg U17 | 3 | (0) |
| 2014–2015 | Luxembourg U19 | 9 | (1) |
| 2018 | Luxembourg U21 | 4 | (1) |
| 2017– | Luxembourg | 5 | (0) |
- * Club domestic league appearances and goals as of 21 September 2026 ‡ National team caps and goals as of 15 November 2026

Tim Hall (born 15 April 1997) is a Luxembourgish professional footballer who plays as a centre-back for Luxembourgish side UNA Strassen and the Luxembourg national team.

== Club career ==
Hall played club football for Lierse S.K., and previously featured for the youth sides of 1. FC Saarbrücken and SV Elversberg. On 10 August 2020, he became a new Gil Vicente player.

On 14 January 2021, he joined the Polish Ekstraklasa side Wisła Kraków, but his contract was terminated just eleven days later.

On 7 March 2024, Hall joined V.League 1 side Hanoi FC, signing a one-year contract.

== International career ==
Hall made his international debut for Luxembourg in 2017 in a friendly against Cape Verde.

== Career statistics ==
=== International ===
As of match played 13 November 2026

Appearances and goals by national team and year
| National team | Year | Apps | Goals |
|---|---|---|---|
| Luxembourg | 2017 | 1 | 0 |
| Luxembourg | 2018 | 0 | 0 |
| Luxembourg | 2019 | 2 | 0 |
| Luxembourg | 2020 | 1 | 0 |
| Luxembourg | 2021 | 0 | 0 |
| Luxembourg | 2022 | 0 | 0 |
| Luxembourg | 2023 | 0 | 0 |
| Luxembourg | 2024 | 0 | 0 |
| Luxembourg | 2025 | 0 | 0 |
| Luxembourg | 2026 | 1 | 0 |
| Total | | 5 | 0 |
