= Abdoulaye Yahaya =

Cameroonian footballer (born 2001)

Personal information
- Date of birth: 7 October 2001 (age 25)
- Place of birth: Bertoua, Cameroon
- Height: 1.70 m (5 ft 7 in)
- Position: Striker

Team information
- Current team: Llapi
- Number: 70

Youth career
- –2020: APEJES Academy
- 2020–2021: Lokomotiva Zagreb

Senior career*
Years	Team	Apps	(Gls)
2021–2022	Újpest	5	(0)
2022–2023	Tuzlaspor	42	(4)
2024–2026	Dender	2	(0)
2025	→ Francs Borains (loan)	13	(0)
2025–2026	→ Leixões (loan)	7	(0)
2026–	Llapi	5	(0)

International career^{‡}
2021	Cameroon U20	3	(1)
2023	Cameroon U23	1	(0)
- * Club domestic league appearances and goals as of 14 September 2026 ‡ National team caps and goals as of 6 May 2025

Abdoulaye Yahaya (born 7 October 2001) is a Cameroonian professional footballer who plays as a striker for Football Superleague of Kosovo club Llapi.

== Club career ==
=== Újpest ===
On 1 December 2021, Yahaya moved to Újpest in Hungary. he scored his first goal in the Hungarian Cup.

=== Tuzlaspor ===
In 2022, Yahaya signed for Tuzlaspor. He scored during a 3–0 win over Denizlispor.

=== Dender ===
On 13 February 2024, Yahaya signed for Dender, on a contract until 2026 with option to extend with one year. On 7 January 2025, Yahaya was loaned by Francs Borains until the end of the season. On 17 July 2025, he moved on a new loan to Leixões in Portugal.

== International career ==
Yahaya played for the Cameroon U23s for a set of 2023 U-23 Africa Cup of Nations qualification matches in March 2023.

== Style of play ==
Yahaya mainly operates as a winger but can also operate as an attacking midfielder.
