= Luca Mack =

German footballer

Personal information
- Full name: Luca Maurice Mack
- Date of birth: 25 May 2000 (age 26)
- Place of birth: Bietigheim-Bissingen, Germany
- Height: 1.86 m (6 ft 1 in)
- Position: Midfielder

Team information
- Current team: Vaduz
- Number: 20

Senior career*
Years	Team	Apps	(Gls)
2018–2019	VfB Stuttgart II	27	(0)
2019–2021	VfB Stuttgart	2	(0)
2021–2024	Újpest	66	(1)
2024–2025	VfB Stuttgart II	20	(0)
2025–	Vaduz	42	(3)
- * Club domestic league appearances and goals as of 28 September 2026

Luca Maurice Mack (born 25 May 2000) is a German professional footballer who plays as a midfielder for Liechtensteiner Swiss Super League club Vaduz.

== Career ==
On 2 October 2024, Mack returned to VfB Stuttgart II.

On 22 May 2025, Mack signed a two-year contract with FC Vaduz, a club from Liechtenstein that plays in the second-tier Swiss Challenge League.

== Personal ==
Besides football, Luca Mack enjoys watching basketball as he is friends with Lukas Herzog.
