= Mátyás Katona =

Hungarian footballer (born 1999)

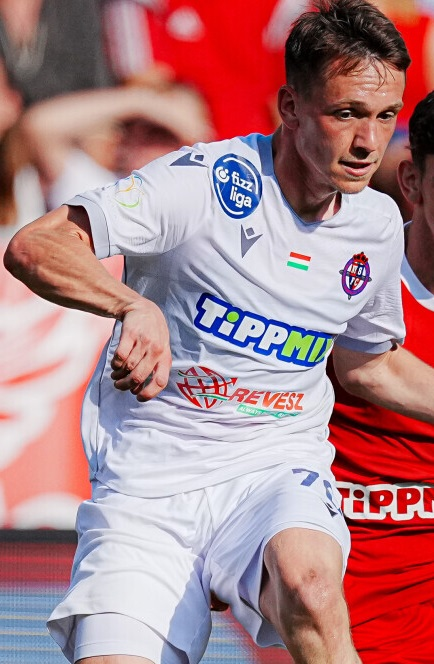
- Katona playing for Nyíregyháza in 2025

Personal information
- Date of birth: 30 December 1999 (age 26)
- Place of birth: Budapest, Hungary
- Height: 1.73 m (5 ft 8 in)
- Position: Attacking midfielder

Team information
- Current team: Nyíregyháza
- Number: 70

Youth career
- 2007–2015: Vasas
- 2015–2018: II. Kerület
- 2018–2019: Újpest

Senior career*
| Years | Team | Apps | (Gls) |
| 2018–2023 | Újpest II | 38 | (12) |
| 2020–2023 | Újpest | 52 | (7) |
| 2019 | → Vác (loan) | 13 | (2) |
| 2023–2025 | Fehérvár | 78 | (14) |
| 2025– | Nyíregyháza | 20 | (1) |
- * Club domestic league appearances and goals as of 30 May 2026

Mátyás Katona (born 30 December 1999) is a Hungarian professional footballer who plays as a midfielder for Nemzeti Bajnokság I club Nyíregyháza.

== Career ==
On 14 February 2023, Katona signed a three-year contract with Fehérvár.

On 2 July 2025, Katona signed a two-year contract with Nyíregyháza.

== Career statistics ==
As of 19 January 2026

Appearances and goals by club, season and competition
| Club | Season | League | | | Cup | | Continental | | Other | | Total | |
| Club | Season | Division | Apps | Goals | Apps | Goals | Apps | Goals | Apps | Goals | Apps | Goals |
|---|---|---|---|---|---|---|---|---|---|---|---|---|
| Vác (loan) | 2019–20 | Nemzeti Bajnokság II | 13 | 2 | 0 | 0 | — | | — | | 13 | 2 |
| Újpest | 2019–20 | Nemzeti Bajnokság I | 2 | 0 | 0 | 0 | — | | — | | 2 | 0 |
| Újpest | 2020–21 | Nemzeti Bajnokság I | 7 | 0 | 3 | 1 | — | | — | | 10 | 1 |
| Újpest | 2021–22 | Nemzeti Bajnokság I | 25 | 5 | 3 | 0 | 3 | 0 | — | | 31 | 5 |
| Újpest | 2022–23 | Nemzeti Bajnokság I | 18 | 2 | 2 | 0 | — | | — | | 20 | 2 |
| Újpest | Total | | 52 | 7 | 8 | 1 | 3 | 0 | — | | 63 | 8 |
| Fehérvár | 2022–23 | Nemzeti Bajnokság I | 13 | 2 | — | | — | | — | | 13 | 2 |
| Fehérvár | 2023–24 | Nemzeti Bajnokság I | 33 | 8 | 1 | 0 | — | | — | | 34 | 8 |
| Fehérvár | 2024–25 | Nemzeti Bajnokság I | 32 | 4 | 2 | 0 | 4 | 0 | — | | 38 | 2 |
| Fehérvár | Total | | 61 | 12 | 3 | 0 | 4 | 0 | — | | 68 | 12 |
| Career total | | | 143 | 23 | 11 | 1 | 7 | 0 | 0 | 0 | 161 | 24 |
