= Miroslav Bjeloš =

Serbian footballer

Personal information
- Date of birth: 29 October 1990 (age 36)
- Place of birth: Novi Sad, SFR Yugoslavia
- Height: 1.77 m (5 ft 10 in)
- Position: Central midfielder

Senior career*
Years	Team	Apps	(Gls)
2008–2009	Metalac Futog	13	(0)
2009–2011	Bačka Palanka	23	(0)
2011-2013	Radnički Šid	39	(4)
2013–2016	Bačka Palanka	62	(8)
2013–2014	→ Burlington SC (loan)		
2017	Limón	0	(0)
2017–2019	Bačka Palanka	24	(0)
2019–2020	Napredak Kruševac	23	(6)
2020–2022	Újpest	43	(4)
2023–2024	Mladost Novi Sad	39	(2)
2024–2025	Bačka Palanka		
2026	FK Buducnost Mladenovo		
2026–	OFK Stari Grad		
- * Club domestic league appearances and goals

Miroslav Bjeloš (Serbian Cyrillic: Мирослав Бјелош; born 29 October 1990) is a Serbian footballer who plays as a midfielder for OFK Stari Grad.

== Club career ==
=== Early career ===
At the beginning of his career, Bjeloš played for Metalac Futog. In 2009, he started playing for OFK Bačka. In 2011, he had a brief stint with Radnički Šid. In the 2013-14 season, he helped Bačka secure promotion to the Serbian First League by winning the Serbian League Vojvodina.

In the summers of 2013 and 2014, he played with Burlington SC in the Canadian Soccer League as a loaned player. Following his loan spells in Canada, he returned to Bačka and helped the club secure promotion to the Serbian SuperLiga in 2016.

At the beginning of 2017, Bjeloš joined Limón. However, he failed to make an appearance in the Costa Rican Primera División due to paperwork issues.

In summer 2017, Bjeloš returned to OFK Bačka and played in the SuperLiga for three seasons.

In summer 2019, after Bačka's relegation, he went to Napredak Kruševac.

=== Hungary ===
In 2020, he signed with Újpest in the Nemzeti Bajnokság I. In his debut season in Hungary, he helped the club win the Magyar Kupa by defeating Fehérvár. Bjeloš was re-signed by Újpest the following season. Throughout his tenure with Újpest, he appeared in the 2021–22 UEFA Europa Conference League against Basel. After three seasons abroad in Hungary, his contract was mutually terminated.

=== Serbia ===
He returned to the Serbian top tier in the winter of 2022 with Mladost Novi Sad. After two seasons in Novi Sad, he returned to Bačka in 2024 to compete in the Vojvodina League North. Throughout the season, he served as the team captain and was honored for his 150th match for the club. He also helped Bačka secure a promotion to the Serbian League by winning the league title. He re-signed with Bačka the following season.

In the winter of 2026, he joined FK Buducnost Mladenovo. Following his short spell with Buducnost Mladenovo, he joined OFK Stari Grad during the summer transfer market.

== Managerial career ==
In 2026, he became a youth coach for OFK Bačka.

== Honors ==
OFK Bačka

- Serbian League Vojvodina: 2013–14
- Vojvodina League North: 2024–25

Újpest FC

- Magyar Kupa: 2020–21
