= 2018–19 Debreceni VSC season =

Debreceni VSC
2018–19 season
- Chairman: (Hungary) Gábor Szima
- Manager: (Hungary) András Herczeg
- NB 1: 3rd
- Hungarian Cup: semi-final
- Top goalscorer: League: Márk Szécsi (Hungary) (8); All: Márk Szécsi (Hungary) (9); Tamás Takács (Hungary) (9)
- Highest home attendance: 7,002 vs Ferencváros (16 February 2019)
- Lowest home attendance: 1,000 vs Mezőkövesd (12 March 2019)
Home colours	Away colours

The 2018–19 season was Debreceni VSC's 41st competitive season, 26th consecutive season in the OTP Bank Liga and 116th year in existence as a football club.

== First team squad ==
Note: Flags indicate national team as defined under FIFA eligibility rules; some limited exceptions apply. Players may hold more than one non-FIFA nationality.

No.	Pos.	Nation	Player
1	GK	UKR	Oleksandr Nad
2	DF	HUN	Ákos Kinyik
3	DF	HUN	Csaba Szatmári
5	DF	HUN	Bence Pávkovics
6	DF	HUN	Balázs Bényei
8	MF	HUN	Dániel Tőzsér
11	MF	HUN	János Ferenczi
14	DF	HUN	Krisztián Kuti
15	DF	HUN	Szabolcs Barna
17	DF	HUN	Norbert Mészáros
18	MF	HUN	Attila Haris
19	FW	HUN	Dániel Zsóri
20	FW	HUN	Tamás Takács
21	MF	HUN	Kevin Varga
22	GK	HUN	Péter Kovács

No.	Pos.	Nation	Player
23	FW	HUN	Dániel Bereczki
25	FW	SUI	Haris Tabaković
26	FW	HUN	Alex Damásdi
27	MF	HUN	Ádám Bódi
28	DF	HUN	Ádám Újvárosi
29	MF	HUN	Erik Kusnyír
33	MF	HUN	Richárd Csősz
42	GK	HUN	Alex Hrabina
44	DF	SVK	Erik Čikoš
70	MF	HUN	Kevin Nagy
71	FW	ALB	Albion Avdijaj
77	MF	BIH	Aleksandar Jovanović
86	GK	SVK	Tomáš Košický
88	FW	HUN	Márk Szécsi

== Transfers ==
=== Summer ===
In: Note: Flags indicate national team as defined under FIFA eligibility rules; some limited exceptions apply. Players may hold more than one non-FIFA nationality.

No.	Pos.	Nation	Player
18	MF	HUN	Attila Haris (from Balmazújváros)
19	MF	ESP	Ezequiel Calvente (from Békéscsaba)
26	FW	HUN	Alex Damásdi (from Cegléd)
27	MF	HUN	Ádám Bódi (from Videoton)
28	DF	HUN	Ádám Újvárosi (from Debrecen U-19)
44	DF	SVK	Erik Čikoš (from (Slovakia) Slovan Bratislava)
71	FW	ALB	Albion Avdijaj (loan from (Switzerland) Grasshoppers)
88	FW	HUN	Márk Szécsi (loan from Puskás Akadémia)
—	MF	HUN	Nándor Kóródi (from Debrecen U-19)
—	DF	HUN	Tibor Bokros (loan return from Balmazújváros)

Out: Note: Flags indicate national team as defined under FIFA eligibility rules; some limited exceptions apply. Players may hold more than one non-FIFA nationality.

No.	Pos.	Nation	Player
10	FW	HUN	Tibor Tisza (Retired)
27	MF	HUN	Ádám Bódi (loan return to Videoton)
99	MF	HUN	Bence Sós (to Videoton)
—	DF	HUN	Tibor Bokros (to Cigánd)

=== Winter ===
In: Note: Flags indicate national team as defined under FIFA eligibility rules; some limited exceptions apply. Players may hold more than one non-FIFA nationality.

No.	Pos.	Nation	Player
5	DF	HUN	Bence Pávkovics (from Újpest)
19	FW	HUN	Dániel Zsóri (from Debrecen II)
42	GK	HUN	Alex Hrabina (from Cigánd)

Out: Note: Flags indicate national team as defined under FIFA eligibility rules; some limited exceptions apply. Players may hold more than one non-FIFA nationality.

No.	Pos.	Nation	Player
4	MF	ROU	Ioan Filip
5	DF	HUN	Bence Pávkovics (loan return to Újpest)
10	FW	HUN	Norbert Könyves (to Paks)
19	MF	ESP	Ezequiel Calvente

== Competitions ==
=== Nemzeti Bajnokság I ===
==== League table ====
Pos	Team	Pld	W	D	L	GF	GA	GD	Pts	Qualification or relegation
1	Ferencváros (C)	33	23	5	5	72	27	+45	74	Qualification for the Champions League first qualifying round
2	Vidi	33	18	7	8	53	37	+16	61	Qualification for the Europa League first qualifying round (Note: Since the winners of the 2018–19 Magyar Kupa, Vidi, qualified for European competition based on league position, the spot awarded to the cup winners (Europa League first qualifying round) was passed to the fourth-placed team.)
3	Debrecen	33	14	9	10	44	39	+5	51	Qualification for the Europa League first qualifying round
4	Honvéd	33	13	10	10	46	38	+8	49	Qualification for the Europa League first qualifying round
5	Újpest	33	12	12	9	38	28	+10	48	

Source: Hungarian Football Federation (in Hungarian), Soccerway
Rules for classification: 1) Points; 2) Matches won; 3) Goal difference; 4) Goals scored; 5) Head-to-head points; 6) Head-to-head goal difference; 7) Head-to-head away goals scored; 8) Fair play ranking; 9) Drawing of lots.
(C) Champions

==== Results summary ====
Overall								Home						Away					
Pld	W	D	L	GF	GA	GD	Pts	W	D	L	GF	GA	GD	W	D	L	GF	GA	GD
33	14	9	10	44	39	+5	51	11	4	2	30	16	+14	3	5	8	14	23	−9

Last updated: 19 May 2019.
Source: NB1

==== Results by round ====
Round	1	2	3	4	5	6	7	8	9	10	11	12	13	14	15	16	17	18	19	20	21	22	23	24	25	26	27	28	29	30	31	32	33
Ground	A	H	H	A	H	A	H	A	H	A	H	H	A	A	H	A	H	A	H	A	H	A	A	H	H	A	H	A	H	A	H	A	H
Result	W	D	W	D	D	L	D	L	W	D	W	W	D	L	L	W	W	W	D	L	W	L	L	W	W	L	W	D	W	D	L	L	W
Position	6	5	3	4	4	4	4	7	6	7	6	4	5	7	7	7	6	3	3	4	4	5	5	3	3	4	4	4	3	3	3	3	3

Updated to match(es) played on 19 May 2019. Source: Matches
A = Away; H = Home; W = Win; D = Draw; L = Loss

==== Matches ====
21 July 2018 1	Puskás Akadémia	0 – 1	Debrecen	Felcsút
17:00 CEST		Report	Calvente 78'	Stadium: Pancho Arena; Attendance: 931; Referee: (Hungary) István Vad

28 July 2018 2	Debrecen	1 – 1	Mezőkövesd	Debrecen
19:30 CEST	Kinyik 87'	Report	Dražić 71'	Stadium: Nagyerdei Stadion; Attendance: 3,228; Referee: (Hungary) Csaba Pintér

4 August 2018 3	Debrecen	2 – 0	Diósgyőr	Debrecen
18:00 CEST	Tőzsér 48'; Szécsi 82'	Report		Stadium: Nagyerdei Stadion; Attendance: 4,028; Referee: (Hungary) József Erdős

10 August 2018 4	MOL Vidi	1 – 1	Debrecen	Felcsút
20:00 CEST	Tamás 90+1'	Report	Varga 14'	Stadium: Pancho Arena; Attendance: 1,446; Referee: (Hungary) Viktor Kassai

17 August 2018 5	Debrecen	3 – 3	MTK Budapest	Debrecen
20:00 CEST	Bódi 41'; Takács 87'; Szatmári 90+5'	Report	Kanta 15'; Lencse 42', 75'	Stadium: Nagyerdei Stadion; Attendance: 4,002; Referee: (Hungary) Balázs Berke

25 August 2018 6	Budapest Honvéd	3 – 0	Debrecen	Budapest
17:00 CEST	Danilo 22', 79' (pen.); Ngog 87'	Report		Stadium: Hidegkuti Nándor Stadion; Attendance: 1,765; Referee: (Hungary) Tamás Bognár

1 September 2018 7	Debrecen	1 – 1	Szombathelyi Haladás	Debrecen
17:00 CEST	Takács 21'	Report	Priskin 42'	Stadium: Nagyerdei Stadion; Attendance: 3,203; Referee: (Hungary) József Erdős

15 September 2018 8	Újpest	1 – 0	Debrecen	Budapest
17:00 CEST	Nagy 22'	Report		Stadium: Szusza Ferenc Stadion; Attendance: 2,595; Referee: (Hungary) Ádám Farkas

29 September 2018 9	Debrecen	3 – 1	Kisvárda	Debrecen
17:00 CEST	Takács 55', 84'; Barna 65'	Report	Horváth 9'	Stadium: Nagyerdei Stadion; Attendance: 2,826; Referee: (Hungary) Viktor Kassai

6 October 2018 10	Ferencváros	2 – 2	Debrecen	Budapest
19:30 CEST	Lanzafame 48', 82'	Report	Takács 20'; Szécsi 74'	Stadium: Groupama Arena; Attendance: 8,911; Referee: (Hungary) Zoltán Iványi

20 October 2018 11	Debrecen	2 – 1	Paks	Debrecen
17:00 CEST	Pávkovics 23'; Bódi 90+3'	Report	Simon 74'	Stadium: Nagyerdei Stadion; Attendance: 2,719; Referee: (Hungary) Ferenc Karakó

27 October 2018 12	Debrecen	2 – 1	Puskás Akadémia	Debrecen
17:00 CEST	Könyves 32'; Avdijaj 71'	Report	Kiss 51'	Stadium: Nagyerdei Stadion; Attendance: 2,814; Referee: (Hungary) Ádám Farkas

3 November 2018 13	Mezőkövesd	2 – 2	Debrecen	Mezőkövesd
17:00 CET	Koszta 18'; Molnár 72'	Report	Könyves 4'; Takács 20'	Stadium: Mezőkövesdi Városi Stadion; Attendance: 2,532; Referee: (Hungary) Tamás Bognár

10 November 2018 14	Diósgyőr	1 – 0	Debrecen	Miskolc
14:30 CET	Hasani 38'	Report		Stadium: DVTK Stadion; Attendance: 2,553; Referee: (Hungary) Zoltán Iványi

25 November 2018 15	Debrecen	0 – 1	MOL Vidi	Debrecen
17:00 CET		Report	Nego 40'	Stadium: Nagyerdei Stadion; Attendance: 2,922; Referee: (Hungary) Zoltán Iványi

1 December 2018 16	MTK Budapest	0 – 1	Debrecen	Budapest
17:00 CET		Report	Varga 10'	Stadium: Hidegkuti Nándor Stadion; Attendance: 1,758; Referee: (Hungary) Gergő Bogár

8 December 2018 17	Debrecen	2 – 0	Budapest Honvéd	Debrecen
17:00 CET	Bódi 44'; Szécsi 81'	Report		Stadium: Nagyerdei Stadion; Attendance: 1,828; Referee: (Hungary) József Erdős

15 December 2018 18	Szombathelyi Haladás	0 – 2	Debrecen	Szombathely
17:00 CET		Report	Bódi 14'; Szécsi 58'	Stadium: Haladás Sportkomplexum; Attendance: 1,220; Referee: (Hungary) Viktor Kassai

2 February 2019 19	Debrecen	0 – 0	Újpest	Debrecen
17:00 CET		Report		Stadium: Nagyerdei Stadion; Attendance: 3,026; Referee: (Hungary) Ferenc Karakó

9 February 2019 20	Kisvárda	3 – 0	Debrecen	Kisvárda
17:00 CET	Tsoukalas 42'; Lukyanchuk 45'; Horváth 55'	Report		Stadium: Várkert Sportpálya; Attendance: 1,542; Referee: (Hungary) Viktor Kassai

16 February 2019 21	Debrecen	2 – 1	Ferencváros	Debrecen
14:00 CET	Tőzsér 83' (pen.); Zsóri 90+3'	Report	Dvali 30'	Stadium: Nagyerdei Stadion; Attendance: 7,002; Referee: (Hungary) Balázs Berke

23 February 2019 22	Paks	2 – 1	Debrecen	Paks
17:00 CET	Nad 63' (o.g.); Hahn 68' (pen.)	Report	Varga 54'	Stadium: Fehérvári úti Stadion; Attendance: 796; Referee: (Hungary) Csaba Pintér

2 March 2019 23	Puskás Akadémia	2 – 0	Debrecen	Felcsút
17:00 CET	Knežević 47' (pen.), 82'	Report		Stadium: Pancho Arena; Attendance: 1,028; Referee: (Hungary) Viktor Kassai

9 March 2019 24	Debrecen	1 – 0	Mezőkövesd	Debrecen
17:00 CET	Kinyik 37'	Report		Stadium: Nagyerdei Stadion; Attendance: 2,800; Referee: (Hungary) Gergő Bogár

16 March 2019 25	Debrecen	1 – 0	Diósgyőr	Debrecen
19:30 CET	Szécsi 18'	Report		Stadium: Nagyerdei Stadion; Attendance: 3,600; Referee: (Hungary) Balázs Berke

30 March 2019 26	MOL Vidi	2 – 1	Debrecen	Székesfehérvár
19:30 CEST	Šćepović 77'; Pátkai 84'	Report	Tőzsér 54'	Stadium: MOL Aréna Sóstó; Attendance: 3,431; Referee: (Hungary) Csaba Pintér

6 April 2019 27	Debrecen	3 – 1	MTK Budapest	Debrecen
17:00 CEST	Ferenczi 5', 22'; Bódi 69'	Report	Torghelle 36'	Stadium: Nagyerdei Stadion; Attendance: 3,200; Referee: (Hungary) Viktor Kassai

13 April 2019 28	Budapest Honvéd	1 – 1	Debrecen	Budapest
17:00 CEST	Holender 5' (pen.)	Report	Csősz 32'	Stadium: Hidegkuti Nándor Stadion; Attendance: 2,128; Referee: (Hungary) Feernc Karakó

20 April 2019 29	Debrecen	2 – 1	Szombathelyi Haladás	Debrecen
17:00 CEST	Szatmári 35'; Bódi 64' (pen.)	Report	Ivanov 76'	Stadium: Nagyerdei Stadion; Attendance: 3,600; Referee: (Hungary) Gergő Bogár

27 April 2019 30	Újpest	1 – 1	Debrecen	Budapest
17:00 CEST	Litauszki 41'	Report	Tőzsér 78'	Stadium: Szusza Ferenc Stadion; Attendance: 3,557; Referee: (Hungary) Balázs Berke

4 May 2019 31	Debrecen	1 – 3	Kisvárda	Debrecen
17:00 CEST	Szécsi 40'	Report	Grozav 55' (pen.), 74'; Horváth 90+4'	Stadium: Nagyerdei Stadion; Attendance: 3,500; Referee: (Hungary) Gergő Bogár

11 May 2019 32	Ferencváros	2 – 1	Debrecen	Budapest
19:30 CEST	Isael 14'; Varga 57'	Report	Pávkovics 43'	Stadium: Groupama Arena; Attendance: 10,857; Referee: (Hungary) Csaba Pintér

19 May 2019 33	Debrecen	4 – 1	Paks	Debrecen
17:00 CEST	Szécsi 19', 33'; Bódi 23'; Tőzsér 52' (pen.)	Report	Cseke 30'	Stadium: Nagyerdei Stadion; Attendance: 6,000; Referee: (Hungary) József Erdős

=== Hungarian Cup ===
22 September 2018 Round 6	BKV Előre	1 – 2	Debrecen	Budapest
15:00 CEST	Bata 90+1'	Report	Szécsi 8'; Könyves 65'	Stadium: Sport utcai Stadium; Referee: (Hungary) Gergő Bogár

31 October 2018 Round 7	Teskánd	0 – 3	Debrecen	Teskánd
12:30 CET		Report	Bényei 14'; Avdijaj 16', 49'	Stadium: Teskándi Sportpálya; Referee: (Hungary) Gábor Barna

4 December 2018 Round of 32	Vasas	1 – 2	Debrecen	Budapest
20:00 CET	Király 61'	Report	Bódi 45' (pen.); Jovanović 71'	Stadium: Szusza Ferenc Stadion; Attendance: 400; Referee: (Hungary) Gergely Szőts

19 February 2019 Round of 16 (leg 1)	Ajka	2 – 3	Debrecen	Ajka
18:30 CET	Illés 61'; Kenderes 73'	Report	Takács 59'; Kuti 66'; Pintér 90+1'	Stadium: Stadion Városi; Attendance: 3,000; Referee: (Hungary) Gergő Bogár

26 February 2019 Round of 16 (leg 2)	Debrecen	1 – 1 (4 – 3 agg.)	Ajka	Debrecen
17:00 CET	Takács 54'	Report	Kovács 69'	Stadium: Nagyerdei Stadion; Attendance: 2,000; Referee: (Hungary) László Lovas

12 March 2019 Quarter-final (leg 1)	Debrecen	1 – 0	Mezőkövesd	Debrecen
18:00 CET	Zsóri 58'	Report		Stadium: Nagyerdei Stadion; Attendance: 1,000; Referee: (Hungary) Sándor Andó-Szabó

2 April 2019 Quarter-final (leg 2)	Mezőkövesd	1 – 2 (1 – 3 agg.)	Debrecen	Mezőkövesd
20:00 CEST	Dražić 45'	Report	Takács 61'; Csősz 87'	Stadium: Mezőkövesdi Városi Stadion; Attendance: 1,456; Referee: (Hungary) Gergely Szőts

16 April 2019 Semi-final (leg 1)	MOL Vidi	1 – 0	Debrecen	Székesfehérvár
18:00 CEST	Futács 3'	Report		Stadium: MOL Aréna Sóstó; Attendance: 2,976; Referee: (Hungary) Ádám Farkas

23 April 2019 Semi-final (leg 2)	Debrecen	0 – 3 (0 – 4 agg.)	MOL Vidi	Debrecen
20:00 CET		Report	Futács 66'; Elek 72'; Huszti 90+2' (pen.)	Stadium: Nagyerdei Stadion; Attendance: 3,400; Referee: (Hungary) Zoltán Iványi

== Statistics ==
=== Appearances and goals ===
Last updated on 19 May 2019.

No.	Pos	Nat	Player	Total		OTP Bank Liga		Hungarian Cup	
No.	Pos	Nat	Player	Apps	Goals	Apps	Goals	Apps	Goals
1	GK	(Ukraine) UKR	Oleksandr Nad	30	-35	30	-35	0	0
2	DF	(Hungary) HUN	Ákos Kinyik	34	2	27	2	7	0
3	DF	(Hungary) HUN	Csaba Szatmári	27	2	24	2	3	0
5	MF	(Hungary) HUN	Bence Pávkovics	32	2	24	2	8	0
6	DF	(Hungary) HUN	Balázs Bényei	10	1	8	0	2	1
8	MF	(Hungary) HUN	Dániel Tőzsér	30	5	27	5	3	0
11	MF	(Hungary) HUN	János Ferenczi	27	2	25	2	2	0
14	DF	(Hungary) HUN	Krisztián Kuti	4	1	1	0	3	1
15	DF	(Hungary) HUN	Szabolcs Barna	18	1	12	1	6	0
17	DF	(Hungary) HUN	Norbert Mészáros	6	0	2	0	4	0
18	MF	(Hungary) HUN	Attila Haris	38	0	31	0	7	0
19	FW	(Hungary) HUN	Dániel Zsóri	20	2	13	1	7	1
20	FW	(Hungary) HUN	Tamás Takács	39	9	32	6	7	3
21	MF	(Hungary) HUN	Kevin Varga	39	3	32	3	7	0
23	FW	(Hungary) HUN	Dániel Bereczki	7	0	6	0	1	0
26	FW	(Hungary) HUN	Alex Damásdi	15	0	8	0	7	0
27	MF	(Hungary) HUN	Ádám Bódi	37	8	31	7	6	1
29	MF	(Hungary) HUN	Erik Kusnyír	27	0	22	0	5	0
33	MF	(Hungary) HUN	Richárd Csősz	23	2	18	1	5	1
44	DF	(Slovakia) SVK	Erik Čikoš	8	0	6	0	2	0
70	MF	(Hungary) HUN	Kevin Nagy	4	0	1	0	3	0
71	FW	(Albania) ALB	Albion Avdijaj	24	3	21	1	3	2
77	MF	(Bosnia and Herzegovina) BIH	Aleksandar Jovanović	21	1	15	0	6	1
86	GK	(Slovakia) SVK	Tomáš Košický	13	-14	4	-4	9	-10
88	FW	(Hungary) HUN	Márk Szécsi	31	9	25	8	6	1
Youth players:
16	MF	(Hungary) HUN	Ádám Pintér	2	1	0	0	2	1
24	MF	(Hungary) HUN	Donát Bárány	2	0	0	0	2	0
28	DF	(Hungary) HUN	Ádám Újvárosi	1	0	0	0	1	0
30	MF	(Hungary) HUN	Tamás Nikitscher	1	0	0	0	1	0
Players no longer at the club:
10	FW	(Hungary) HUN	Norbert Könyves	12	3	11	2	1	1
19	MF	(Spain) ESP	Ezequiel Calvente	4	1	4	1	0	0

=== Top scorers ===
Includes all competitive matches. The list is sorted by shirt number when total goals are equal.

Last updated on 19 May 2019

Position	Nation	Number	Name	OTP Bank Liga	Hungarian Cup	Total
1	(Hungary)	88	Márk Szécsi	8	1	9
2	(Hungary)	20	Tamás Takács	6	3	9
3	(Hungary)	27	Ádám Bódi	7	1	8
4	(Hungary)	8	Dániel Tőzsér	5	0	5
5	(Hungary)	21	Kevin Varga	3	0	3
6	(Hungary)	10	Norbert Könyves	2	1	3
7	(Albania)	71	Albion Avdijaj	1	2	3
8	(Hungary)	2	Ákos Kinyik	2	0	2
9	(Hungary)	11	János Ferenczi	2	0	2
10	(Hungary)	3	Csaba Szatmári	2	0	2
11	(Hungary)	5	Bence Pávkovics	2	0	2
12	(Hungary)	19	Dániel Zsóri	1	1	2
13	(Hungary)	33	Richárd Csősz	1	1	2
14	(Spain)	19	Ezequiel Calvente	1	0	1
15	(Hungary)	15	Szabolcs Barna	1	0	1
16	(Hungary)	6	Balázs Bényei	1	0	1
17	(Bosnia and Herzegovina)	77	Aleksandar Jovanović	0	1	1
18	(Hungary)	14	Krisztián Kuti	0	1	1
19	(Hungary)	23	Ádám Pintér	0	1	1
/	/	/	Own Goals	0	0	0
			TOTALS	44	14	58

=== Disciplinary record ===
Includes all competitive matches. Players with 1 card or more included only.

Last updated on 19 May 2019

Position	Nation	Number	Name	OTP Bank Liga		Hungarian Cup		Total (Hu Total)	
Position	Nation	Number	Name	Booked	Sent off (straight red)	Booked	Sent off (straight red)	Booked	Sent off (straight red)
GK	(Ukraine)	1	Oleksandr Nad	4	0	0	0	4 (4)	0 (0)
DF	(Hungary)	2	Ákos Kinyik	9	1	3	0	12 (9)	1 (1)
DF	(Hungary)	3	Csaba Szatmári	3	0	1	0	4 (3)	0 (0)
MF	(Hungary)	5	Bence Pávkovics	8	0	1	0	9 (8)	0 (0)
DF	(Hungary)	6	Balázs Bényei	2	0	1	0	3 (2)	0 (0)
MF	(Hungary)	8	Dániel Tőzsér	4	0	2	0	6 (4)	0 (0)
FW	(Hungary)	10	Norbert Könyves	3	0	0	0	3 (3)	0 (0)
MF	(Hungary)	11	János Ferenczi	4	0	0	0	4 (4)	0 (0)
DF	(Hungary)	14	Krisztián Kuti	0	0	1	0	1 (0)	0 (0)
DF	(Hungary)	15	Szabolcs Barna	2	0	1	0	3 (2)	0 (0)
MF	(Hungary)	18	Attila Haris	7	0	2	0	9 (7)	0 (0)
FW	(Hungary)	19	Dániel Zsóri	4	0	2	0	6 (4)	0 (0)
MF	(Spain)	19	Ezequiel Calvente	1	0	0	0	1 (1)	0 (0)
FW	(Hungary)	20	Tamás Takács	0	0	1	0	1 (0)	0 (0)
MF	(Hungary)	21	Kevin Varga	7	0	0	0	7 (7)	0 (0)
FW	(Hungary)	26	Alex Damásdi	1	0	1	0	2 (1)	0 (0)
MF	(Hungary)	27	Ádám Bódi	4	0	1	0	5 (4)	0 (0)
MF	(Hungary)	29	Erik Kusnyír	5	0	1	0	6 (5)	0 (0)
MF	(Hungary)	30	Tamás Nikitscher	0	0	1	0	1 (0)	0 (0)
MF	(Hungary)	33	Richárd Csősz	8	0	1	0	9 (8)	0 (0)
DF	(Slovakia)	44	Erik Čikoš	1	0	0	0	1 (1)	0 (0)
FW	(Albania)	71	Albion Avdijaj	2	0	1	0	3 (2)	0 (0)
MF	(Bosnia and Herzegovina)	77	Aleksandar Jovanović	2	0	0	0	2 (2)	0 (0)
GK	(Slovakia)	86	Tomáš Košický	0	0	2	0	2 (0)	0 (0)
FW	(Hungary)	88	Márk Szécsi	2	0	0	0	2 (2)	0 (0)
			TOTALS	83	1	23	0	106 (83)	1 (1)

=== Overall ===
Games played	42 (33 OTP Bank Liga and 9 Hungarian Cup)
Games won	20 (14 OTP Bank Liga and 6 Hungarian Cup)
Games drawn	10 (9 OTP Bank Liga and 1 Hungarian Cup)
Games lost	12 (10 OTP Bank Liga and 2 Hungarian Cup)
Goals scored	58
Goals conceded	49
Goal difference	+9
Yellow cards	106
Red cards	1
Worst discipline	(Hungary) Ákos Kinyik (12 (yellow card) , 1 (red card) )
Best result	3–0 (A) v Teskánd - Magyar Kupa - 31-10-2018
Best result	4–1 (H) v Paks - Nemzeti Bajnokság I - 19-05-2019
Worst result	0–3 (A) v Budapest Honvéd - Nemzeti Bajnokság I - 25-08-2018
Worst result	0–3 (A) v Kisvárda - Nemzeti Bajnokság I - 09-02-2019
Worst result	0–3 (H) v MOL Vidi - Magyar Kupa - 23-04-2019
Most appearances	(Hungary) Tamás Takács (39 appearances)
Most appearances	(Hungary) Kevin Varga (39 appearances)
Top scorer	(Hungary) Tamás Takács (9 goals)
Top scorer	(Hungary) Márk Szécsi (9 goals)
Points	70/126 (55.56%)

Last updated: 19 May 2019
