= 2019–20 Debreceni VSC season =

Debreceni VSC
2019–20 season
- Chairman: Gábor Szima
- Manager: András Herczeg (until 14 December 2019); Zoltán Vitelki (until 14 March 2020); Elemér Kondás
- Stadium: Nagyerdei Stadion
- NB 1: 11th (relegated)
- Hungarian Cup: semi-final
- UEFA Europa League: Second qualifying round
- Top goalscorer: League: Márk Szécsi (9); Tunde Adeniji (9); All: Tunde Adeniji (12)
- Highest home attendance: 15,350 vs Torino (1 August 2019)
- Lowest home attendance: 1,720 vs Fehérvár (5 February 2020)
| Home colours | Away colours |

The 2019–20 season will be Debreceni VSC's 42nd competitive season, 27th consecutive season in the OTP Bank Liga and 117th year in existence as a football club.

== First team squad ==
Note: Flags indicate national team as defined under FIFA eligibility rules; some limited exceptions apply. Players may hold more than one non-FIFA nationality.

| No. | Pos. | Nation | Player |
|---|---|---|---|
| 1 | GK | UKR | Oleksandr Nad |
| 2 | DF | HUN | Ákos Kinyik |
| 3 | DF | HUN | Csaba Szatmári |
| 5 | DF | HUN | Bence Pávkovics |
| 6 | DF | HUN | Balázs Bényei |
| 8 | MF | HUN | Dániel Tőzsér |
| 11 | MF | HUN | János Ferenczi |
| 13 | FW | CMR | Florentin Bouoli |
| 14 | DF | HUN | Krisztián Kuti |
| 15 | DF | HUN | Szabolcs Barna |
| 16 | DF | HUN | Ádám Pintér |
| 18 | MF | HUN | Attila Haris |
| 19 | MF | HUN | Arthur Györgyi |
| 20 | FW | HUN | Tamás Takács |
| 21 | MF | HUN | Kevin Varga |
| 22 | GK | HUN | Péter Kovács |

| No. | Pos. | Nation | Player |
|---|---|---|---|
| 23 | FW | HUN | Dániel Bereczki |
| 25 | FW | NGA | Tunde Adeniji |
| 26 | FW | HUN | Alex Damásdi |
| 27 | MF | HUN | Ádám Bódi |
| 28 | DF | HUN | Ádám Újvárosi |
| 29 | MF | HUN | Erik Kusnyír |
| 33 | MF | HUN | Richárd Csősz |
| 42 | GK | HUN | Alex Hrabina |
| 70 | MF | HUN | Kevin Nagy |
| 77 | FW | HUN | Dániel Zsóri |
| 86 | GK | SVK | Tomáš Košický |
| 88 | FW | HUN | Márk Szécsi |
| 92 | FW | SRB | Nikola Trujić |
| 99 | FW | NGA | Haruna Garba |
| TBA | MF | HUN | Nándor Kóródi |

== Transfers ==
=== Summer ===
In: Note: Flags indicate national team as defined under FIFA eligibility rules; some limited exceptions apply. Players may hold more than one non-FIFA nationality.

| No. | Pos. | Nation | Player |
|---|---|---|---|
| 13 | FW | CMR | Florentin Bouoli (from (France) Stade Reims) |
| 19 | MF | ROU | Arthur Györgyi (from (Romania) Miercurea Ciuc) |
| 25 | FW | NGA | Tunde Adeniji (from (Kuwait) Al-Nasr) |
| 31 | FW | HUN | Zsombor Bévárdi (loan from Fehérvár) |
| 65 | FW | HUN | Norbert Kundrák (from Ferencváros) |
| 88 | FW | HUN | Márk Szécsi (from Puskás Akadémia) |
| 92 | MF | SRB | Nikola Trujić (from (Serbia) Voždovac) |
| 99 | FW | NGA | Haruna Garba (from (Malta) Gżira United) |
| — | MF | HUN | Nándor Kóródi (loan return from Balmazújváros) |
| — | MF | SRB | Danilo Sekulić (loan return from (Armenia) Alashkert) |

Out: Note: Flags indicate national team as defined under FIFA eligibility rules; some limited exceptions apply. Players may hold more than one non-FIFA nationality.

| No. | Pos. | Nation | Player |
|---|---|---|---|
| 17 | DF | HUN | Norbert Mészáros (to Debrecen II) |
| 20 | FW | HUN | Tamás Takács (to Mezőkövesd) |
| 25 | FW | SUI | Haris Tabaković (to Diósgyőr) |
| 44 | DF | SVK | Erik Čikoš |
| 70 | FW | HUN | Kevin Nagy (to Szolnok) |
| 71 | FW | ALB | Albion Avdijaj (loan return to (Switzerland) Grasshopper) |
| 77 | MF | BIH | Aleksandar Jovanović (to Szeged) |
| 77 | FW | HUN | Dániel Zsóri (to Fehérvár) |
| — | MF | SRB | Danilo Sekulić (to (Serbia) Mladost Lučani) |
| — | MF | HUN | Nándor Kóródi (loan to Szeged) |

=== Winter ===
In: Note: Flags indicate national team as defined under FIFA eligibility rules; some limited exceptions apply. Players may hold more than one non-FIFA nationality.

| No. | Pos. | Nation | Player |
|---|---|---|---|
| 10 | MF | SRB | Luka Milunović (from (Malaysia) Melaka United) |
| 19 | MF | UKR | Yuriy Habovda (from Szombathely) |
| 71 | DF | HUN | Csaba Belényesi (from Debrecen II) |
| 77 | MF | HUN | Péter Baráth (from Debrecen U-19) |
| — | MF | HUN | Bence Szabó (from Diósgyőr) |

Out: Note: Flags indicate national team as defined under FIFA eligibility rules; some limited exceptions apply. Players may hold more than one non-FIFA nationality.

| No. | Pos. | Nation | Player |
|---|---|---|---|
| 13 | FW | CMR | Florentin Bouoli |
| 14 | DF | HUN | Krisztián Kuti (to Szeged) |
| 16 | MF | HUN | Ádám Pintér (loan to Kaposvár) |
| 19 | MF | ROU | Arthur Györgyi (to Nyíregyháza) |
| 22 | GK | HUN | Péter Kovács (loan to Budaörs) |
| 28 | DF | HUN | Ádám Újvárosi (to Vasas) |
| 31 | MF | HUN | Zsombor Bévárdi (loan to Kaposvár) |

== Competitions ==
=== Overview ===
| Competition | First match | Last match | Starting round | Final position | Record | | | | | | | |
| Competition | First match | Last match | Starting round | Final position | Pld | W | D | L | GF | GA | GD | Win % |
|---|---|---|---|---|---|---|---|---|---|---|---|---|
| Nemzeti Bajnokság I | 11 August 2019 | – | Matchday 1 | – | 5 | 3 | 0 | 2 | 12 | 9 | +3 | 60.00 |
| Magyar Kupa | 21 September 2019 | 11 December 2019 | Sixth round | Round of 32 | 3 | 2 | 0 | 1 | 6 | 1 | +5 | 66.67 |
| UEFA Europa League | 11 July 2019 | 1 August 2019 | First qualifying round | Second qualifying round | 4 | 1 | 1 | 2 | 5 | 8 | −3 | 25.00 |
| Total | | | | | 12 | 6 | 1 | 5 | 23 | 18 | +5 | 50.00 |

Last updated: 23 September 2019
Source: Competitions

=== Nemzeti Bajnokság I ===
==== League table ====
| Pos | Team | Pld | W | D | L | GF | GA | GD | Pts | Qualification or relegation |
|---|---|---|---|---|---|---|---|---|---|---|
| 8 | Kisvárda | 33 | 12 | 6 | 15 | 42 | 43 | −1 | 42 | |
| 9 | Diósgyőr | 33 | 12 | 5 | 16 | 40 | 52 | −12 | 41 | |
| 10 | Paks | 33 | 11 | 8 | 14 | 46 | 53 | −7 | 41 | |
| 11 | Debrecen (R) | 33 | 11 | 6 | 16 | 48 | 57 | −9 | 39 | Relegation to the Nemzeti Bajnokság II |
| 12 | Kaposvár (R) | 33 | 4 | 2 | 27 | 27 | 80 | −53 | 14 | Relegation to the Nemzeti Bajnokság II |

Source: Hungarian Football Federation (in Hungarian), Soccerway
Rules for classification: 1) Points; 2) Matches won; 3) Goal difference; 4) Goals scored; 5) Head-to-head points; 6) Head-to-head goal difference; 7) Head-to-head away goals scored; 8) Fair play ranking; 9) Drawing of lots.
(R) Relegated

==== Results summary ====
| Overall | | | | | | | | Home | | | | | | Away | | | | | |
| Pld | W | D | L | GF | GA | GD | Pts | W | D | L | GF | GA | GD | W | D | L | GF | GA | GD |
|---|---|---|---|---|---|---|---|---|---|---|---|---|---|---|---|---|---|---|---|
| 33 | 11 | 6 | 16 | 48 | 57 | −9 | 39 | 7 | 5 | 5 | 30 | 26 | +4 | 4 | 1 | 11 | 18 | 31 | −13 |

Last updated: 27 June 2020.
Source: NB1

==== Results by round ====
| Round | 1 | 2 | 3 | 4 | 5 | 6 | 7 | 8 | 9 | 10 | 11 | 12 | 13 | 14 | 15 | 16 | 17 | 18 | 19 | 20 | 21 | 22 | 23 | 24 | 25 | 26 | 27 | 28 | 29 | 30 | 31 | 32 | 33 |
|---|---|---|---|---|---|---|---|---|---|---|---|---|---|---|---|---|---|---|---|---|---|---|---|---|---|---|---|---|---|---|---|---|---|
| Ground | A | H | H | A | H | A | H | A | H | A | H | H | A | A | H | A | H | A | H | A | H | A | A | H | H | A | H | A | H | A | H | A | H |
| Result | L | W | W | W | L | L | L | L | W | L | W | L | L | W | D | L | W | D | D | W | L | L | L | W | L | L | D | L | D | L | W | W | D |
| Position | 7 | 4 | 4 | 3 | 4 | 5 | 6 | 8 | 6 | 7 | 6 | 7 | 9 | 8 | 8 | 8 | 7 | 8 | 8 | 6 | 7 | 8 | 9 | 7 | 8 | 9 | 11 | 11 | 11 | 11 | 11 | 11 | 11 |

Updated to match(es) played on 27 June 2020. Source: Matches
A = Away; H = Home; W = Win; D = Draw; L = Loss

==== Matches ====
| 23 May 2020 1 | Ferencváros | 2 – 1 | Debrecen | Budapest |
| CEST | Sigér 22', 42' | Report | Bódi 13' | Stadium: Groupama Arena; Attendance: Behind closed doors Referee: Csaba Pintér |

| 11 August 2019 2 | Debrecen | 4 – 1 | Kisvárda | Debrecen |
| 18:00 CEST | Szatmári 13'; Varga 26'; Garba 62'; Pávkovics 90+4' | Report | Grozav 28' | Stadium: Nagyerdei Stadion; Attendance: 4,540; Referee: Sándor Andó-Szabó |

| 17 August 2019 3 | Debrecen | 3 – 2 | Zalaegerszeg | Debrecen |
| 17:00 CEST | Trujić 3'; Szécsi 25'; Garba 66' | Report | Bedi 17'; Mitrović 64' | Stadium: Nagyerdei Stadion; Attendance: 4,150; Referee: Viktor Kassai |

| 24 August 2019 4 | Budapest Honvéd | 2 – 3 | Debrecen | Budapest |
| 18:00 CEST | Lanzafame 44', 82' | Report | Trujić 8'; Haris 67'; Varga 77' | Stadium: Hidegkuti Nándor Stadion; Attendance: 2,441; Referee: Ádám Farkas |

| 31 August 2019 5 | Debrecen | 0 – 1 | Kaposvár | Debrecen |
| 19:30 CEST | | Report | Ádám 9' | Stadium: Nagyerdei Stadion; Attendance: 4,120; Referee: Ádám Pillók |

| 14 September 2019 6 | Újpest | 3 – 2 | Debrecen | Budapest |
| 17:00 CEST | Koszta 75'; Feczesin 87', 90+4' (pen.) | Report | Garba 22'; Adeniji 85' | Stadium: Illovszky Rudolf Stadion; Attendance: 2,548; Referee: József Erdős |

| 28 September 2019 7 | Debrecen | 1 – 2 | Puskás Akadémia | Debrecen |
| 17:00 CEST | Szécsi 82' | Report | Gyurcsó 10', 43' | Stadium: Nagyerdei Stadion; Attendance: 3,250; Referee: Tamás Bognár |

| 5 October 2019 8 | Fehérvár | 2 – 1 | Debrecen | Székesfehérvár |
| 19:30 CEST | Kovács 9'; Musliu 66' | Report | Adeniji 29' | Stadium: MOL Aréna Sóstó; Attendance: 3,301; Referee: Zoltán Iványi |

| 19 October 2019 9 | Debrecen | 2 – 1 | Diósgyőr | Debrecen |
| 17:00 CEST | Szécsi 9'; Tőzsér 65' (pen.) | Report | Márkvárt 47' | Stadium: Nagyerdei Stadion; Attendance: 5,460; Referee: Gergő Bogár |

| 26 October 2019 10 | Mezőkövesd | 3 – 1 | Debrecen | Mezőkövesd |
| 14:30 CEST | Berecz 45'; Zivzivadze 53'; Vayda 82' | Report | Adeniji 61' | Stadium: Városi Stadion; Attendance: 2,628; Referee: Tamás Bognár |

| 2 November 2019 11 | Debrecen | 3 – 1 | Paks | Debrecen |
| 17:00 CET | Szécsi 28'; Kusnyír 32'; Kundrák 60' | Report | Böde 81' | Stadium: Nagyerdei Stadion; Attendance: 2,650; Referee: Bence Csonka |

| 10 November 2019 12 | Debrecen | 1 – 6 | Ferencváros | Debrecen |
| 17:15 CET | Kundrák 50' | Report | Varga 11', 79'; Nguen 36', 87'; Isael 61'; Bőle 76' | Stadium: Nagyerdei Stadion; Attendance: 8,136; Referee: Ádám Farkas |

| 23 November 2019 13 | Kisvárda | 1 – 0 | Debrecen | Kisvárda |
| 17:00 CET | Kravchenko 13' | Report | | Stadium: Várkerti Stadion; Attendance: 2,859; Referee: Zoltán Iványi |

| 30 November 2019 14 | Zalaegerszeg | 0 – 2 | Debrecen | Zalaegerszeg |
| 15:45 CET | | Report | Garba 10', 78' | Stadium: ZTE Arena; Attendance: 2,119; Referee: József Erdős |

| 7 December 2019 15 | Debrecen | 1 – 1 | Budapest Honvéd | Debrecen |
| 17:00 CET | Varga 62' | Report | Batik 46' | Stadium: Nagyerdei Stadion; Attendance: 2,080; Referee: Viktor Kassai |

| 14 December 2019 16 | Kaposvár | 4 – 1 | Debrecen | Kaposvár |
| 17:00 CET | Balázs 10'; Szatmári 45' (o.g.); R. Nagy 49'; Tömösvári 90' | Report | Adeniji 51' | Stadium: Rákóczi Stadion; Attendance: 1,169; Referee: Tamás Bognár |

| 25 January 2020 17 | Debrecen | 4 – 0 | Újpest | Debrecen |
| 19:00 CET | Szécsi 49', 53'; Bódi 68' (pen.); Adeniji 73' | Report | | Stadium: Nagyerdei Stadion; Attendance: 2,120; Referee: Ádám Farkas |

| 1 February 2020 18 | Puskás Akadémia | 0 – 0 | Debrecen | Felcsút |
| 17:00 CET | | Report | | Stadium: Pancho Aréna; Attendance: 1,018; Referee: Balázs Berke |

| 5 February 2020 19 | Debrecen | 1 – 1 | Fehérvár | Debrecen |
| 18:00 CET | Bódi 81' (pen.) | Report | Hodžić 27' | Stadium: Nagyerdei Stadion; Attendance: 1,720; Referee: Gergő Bogár |

| 8 February 2020 20 | Diósgyőr | 1 – 2 | Debrecen | Miskolc |
| 17:00 CET | Ivanovski 4' | Report | Adeniji 14'; Kinyik 16' | Stadium: DVTK Stadion; Attendance: 4,802; Referee: Zoltán Iványi |

| 15 February 2020 21 | Debrecen | 1 – 3 | Mezőkövesd | Debrecen |
| 17:00 CET | Trujić 90+1' | Report | Pillár 29'; Zivzivadze 37'; Silye 48' | Stadium: Nagyerdei Stadion; Attendance: 3,020; Referee: Tamás Bognár |

| 22 February 2020 22 | Paks | 4 – 2 | Debrecen | Paks |
| 17:00 CET | Kulcsár 26'; Böde 32'; Sajbán 87'; Windecker 90+2' | Report | Szécsi 5'; Garba 65' | Stadium: Fehérvári úti Stadion; Attendance: 1,221; Referee: Balázs Berke |

| 29 February 2020 23 | Ferencváros | 2 – 0 | Debrecen | Budapest |
| 19:30 CET | Kinyik 6' (o.g.); Boli 39' | Report | | Stadium: Groupama Arena; Attendance: 8,579; Referee: Csaba Pintér |

| 7 March 2020 24 | Debrecen | 1 – 0 | Kisvárda | Debrecen |
| 17:00 CET | Varga 50' | Report | | Stadium: Nagyerdei Stadion; Attendance: 2,850; Referee: Balázs Berke |

| 14 March 2020 25 | Debrecen | 0 – 3 | Zalaegerszeg | Debrecen |
| 17:00 CET | | Report | G. Bobál 30'; Stieber 39'; Radó 87' | Stadium: Nagyerdei Stadion; Attendance: on closed Referee: Zoltán Iványi |

| 31 May 2020 26 | Budapest Honvéd | 3 – 1 | Debrecen | Budapest |
| 18:55 CEST | Kamber 15'; Ugrai 51' (pen.); Szemerédi 89' | Report | Adeniji 67' | Stadium: Hidegkuti Nándor Stadion; Attendance: 700; Referee: Csaba Pintér |

| 5 June 2020 27 | Debrecen | 1 – 1 | Kaposvár | Debrecen |
| 20:00 CEST | Szabó 6' | Report | Borbély 87' | Stadium: Nagyerdei Stadion; Attendance: 2,400; Referee: Ádám Farkas |

| 9 June 2020 28 | Újpest | 3 – 1 | Debrecen | Budapest |
| 19:00 CEST | Ristevski 9'; Simon 48', 62' | Report | Heris 59' (o.g.) | Stadium: Szusza Ferenc Stadion; Attendance: 2,500; Referee: Balázs Berke |

| 13 June 2020 29 | Debrecen | 2 – 2 | Puskás Akadémia | Debrecen |
| 19:00 CEST | Adeniji 6', 63' | Report | Knežević 33' van Nieff 57' | Stadium: Nagyerdei Stadion; Attendance: 2,850; Referee: Zoltán Iványi |

| 17 June 2020 30 | Fehérvár | 1 – 0 | Debrecen | Székesfehérvár |
| 19:00 CEST | Futács 83' | Report | | Stadium: MOL Aréna Sóstó; Attendance: 1,812; Referee: István Vad |

| 21 June 2020 31 | Debrecen | 4 – 0 | Diósgyőr | Debrecen |
| 21:05 CEST | Szécsi 8', 14'; Szatmári 44'; Tőzsér 71' (pen.) | Report | | Stadium: Nagyerdei Stadion; Attendance: 4,650; Referee: Tamás Bognár |

| 24 June 2020 32 | Mezőkövesd | 0 – 1 | Debrecen | Mezőkövesd |
| 16:55 CEST | | Report | Garba 90' | Stadium: Városi Stadion; Attendance: 3,190; Referee: Sándor Andó-Szabó |

| 27 June 2020 33 | Debrecen | 1 – 1 | Paks | Debrecen |
| 17:30 CEST | Szélpál 74' (o.g.) | Report | Könyves 17' | Stadium: Nagyerdei Stadion; Attendance: 9,400; Referee: Balázs Berke |

=== Hungarian Cup ===
| 21 September 2019 6th round | Sárvár | 0 – 3 | Debrecen | Sárvár |
| 15:00 CEST | | Report | Adeniji 19', 49', 61' | Stadium: Sárvári Sporttelep; Attendance: 700; Referee: Márió Görög |

| 30 October 2019 7th round | Tatabánya | 0 – 2 | Debrecen | Tatabánya |
| 12:30 CEST | | Report | Belényesi 68'; Garba 90' | Stadium: Városi Stadion; Attendance: 300; Referee: Gergely Kovács |

| 11 December 2019 Round of 32 | Dorog | 1 – 1 (5–4 p) | Debrecen | Dorog |
| 12:00 CET | Csillag 46' | Report | Kinyik 87' | Stadium: Buzánszky Jenő Stadion; Attendance: 250; Referee: Ádám Radványi |
| | Penalties |
| | Kitl (penalty scored); Beke (penalty scored); Girsik (penalty scored); Takács (penalty scored); Lénárt (penalty scored) | | (penalty scored) Csősz; (penalty scored) Haris; (penalty missed) Trujić; (penalty scored) Pávkovics; (penalty scored) Varga |

=== UEFA Europa League ===
==== First qualifying round ====
| 11 July 2019 Q1 Leg 1 | Debrecen | 3 – 0 | (Albania) Kukësi | Debrecen |
| 19:00 CEST | Garba 54'; Varga 77', 83' | Report | | Stadium: Nagyerdei Stadion; Attendance: 10,250; Referee: (Austria) Sebastian Gishamer |

| 18 July 2019 Q1 Leg 2 | Kukësi (Albania) | 1 – 1 (1 – 4 agg.) | Debrecen | Elbasan, Albania |
| 20:00 CEST | Ethemi 17' | Report | Szatmári 58' | Stadium: Elbasan Arena; Attendance: 547; Referee: (Bulgaria) Stanislav Todorov |

==== Second qualifying round ====
| 25 July 2019 Q2 Leg 1 | Torino (Italy) | 3 – 0 | Debrecen | Alessandria, Italy |
| 21:00 CEST | Belotti 20' (pen.); Ansaldi 42'; Zaza 93' | Report | | Stadium: Stadio Giuseppe Moccagatta; Attendance: 4,376; Referee: (Denmark) Jens Maae |

| 1 August 2019 Q2 Leg 2 | Debrecen | 1 – 4 (1 – 7 agg.) | (Italy) Torino | Debrecen |
| 18:30 CEST | Garba 52' | Report | Zaza 25'; Izzo 32'; Belotti 69'; Millico 90+2' | Stadium: Nagyerdei Stadion; Attendance: 15,350; Referee: (Croatia) Fran Jović |

== Statistics ==
=== Appearances and goals ===
Last updated on 27 June 2020.

| No. | Pos | Nat | Player | Total | | OTP Bank Liga | | Hungarian Cup | | Europa League | |
| No. | Pos | Nat | Player | Apps | Goals | Apps | Goals | Apps | Goals | Apps | Goals |
|---|---|---|---|---|---|---|---|---|---|---|---|
| 1 | GK | (Ukraine) UKR | Oleksandr Nad | 21 | -39 | 17 | -31 | 0 | 0 | 4 | -8 |
| 2 | DF | (Hungary) HUN | Ákos Kinyik | 30 | 2 | 26 | 1 | 2 | 1 | 2 | 0 |
| 3 | DF | (Hungary) HUN | Csaba Szatmári | 27 | 3 | 23 | 2 | 0 | 0 | 4 | 1 |
| 4 | DF | (Hungary) HUN | Balázs Bényei | 20 | 0 | 19 | 0 | 1 | 0 | 0 | 0 |
| 5 | DF | (Hungary) HUN | Bence Pávkovics | 36 | 1 | 30 | 1 | 2 | 0 | 4 | 0 |
| 8 | MF | (Hungary) HUN | Dániel Tőzsér | 26 | 2 | 21 | 2 | 1 | 0 | 4 | 0 |
| 10 | MF | (Serbia) SRB | Luka Milunović | 8 | 0 | 8 | 0 | 0 | 0 | 0 | 0 |
| 11 | MF | (Hungary) HUN | János Ferenczi | 37 | 0 | 32 | 0 | 1 | 0 | 4 | 0 |
| 15 | DF | (Hungary) HUN | Szabolcs Barna | 7 | 0 | 4 | 0 | 3 | 0 | 0 | 0 |
| 16 | MF | (Hungary) HUN | Bence Szabó | 4 | 1 | 4 | 1 | 0 | 0 | 0 | 0 |
| 18 | MF | (Hungary) HUN | Attila Haris | 30 | 1 | 24 | 1 | 2 | 0 | 4 | 0 |
| 19 | DF | (Ukraine) UKR | Yuriy Habovda | 6 | 0 | 6 | 0 | 0 | 0 | 0 | 0 |
| 21 | MF | (Hungary) HUN | Kevin Varga | 36 | 6 | 29 | 4 | 3 | 0 | 4 | 2 |
| 23 | MF | (Hungary) HUN | Dániel Bereczki | 3 | 0 | 2 | 0 | 1 | 0 | 0 | 0 |
| 25 | FW | (Nigeria) NGA | Tunde Adeniji | 31 | 12 | 28 | 9 | 2 | 3 | 1 | 0 |
| 27 | MF | (Hungary) HUN | Ádám Bódi | 17 | 3 | 17 | 3 | 0 | 0 | 0 | 0 |
| 29 | DF | (Ukraine) UKR | Erik Kusnyír | 34 | 1 | 29 | 1 | 1 | 0 | 4 | 0 |
| 33 | MF | (Hungary) HUN | Richárd Csősz | 24 | 0 | 18 | 0 | 3 | 0 | 3 | 0 |
| 65 | FW | (Hungary) HUN | Norbert Kundrák | 21 | 2 | 19 | 2 | 2 | 0 | 0 | 0 |
| 71 | DF | (Hungary) HUN | Csaba Belényesi | 2 | 1 | 1 | 0 | 1 | 1 | 0 | 0 |
| 77 | MF | (Hungary) HUN | Péter Baráth | 7 | 0 | 7 | 0 | 0 | 0 | 0 | 0 |
| 86 | GK | (Slovakia) SVK | Tomáš Košický | 20 | -27 | 17 | -26 | 3 | -1 | 0 | 0 |
| 88 | FW | (Hungary) HUN | Márk Szécsi | 36 | 9 | 31 | 9 | 1 | 0 | 4 | 0 |
| 92 | MF | (Serbia) SRB | Nikola Trujić | 30 | 3 | 24 | 3 | 2 | 0 | 4 | 0 |
| 99 | FW | (Nigeria) NGA | Haruna Garba | 34 | 10 | 28 | 7 | 2 | 1 | 4 | 2 |
Youth players:
| 24 | MF | (Hungary) HUN | Márk Kónya | 1 | 0 | 0 | 0 | 1 | 0 | 0 | 0 |
| 26 | FW | (Hungary) HUN | Alex Damásdi | 2 | 0 | 0 | 0 | 1 | 0 | 1 | 0 |
| 30 | MF | (Hungary) HUN | Kristóf Sármány | 1 | 0 | 0 | 0 | 1 | 0 | 0 | 0 |
| 42 | GK | (Hungary) HUN | Alex Hrabina | 0 | 0 | 0 | 0 | 0 | 0 | 0 | 0 |
Out to loan:
| 16 | MF | (Hungary) HUN | Ádám Pintér | 8 | 0 | 4 | 0 | 3 | 0 | 1 | 0 |
Players no longer at the club:
| 13 | FW | (Cameroon) CMR | Florentin Bouoli | 2 | 0 | 0 | 0 | 2 | 0 | 0 | 0 |
| 14 | DF | (Hungary) HUN | Krisztián Kuti | 2 | 0 | 0 | 0 | 2 | 0 | 0 | 0 |
| 19 | MF | (Romania) ROU | Arthur Györgyi | 0 | 0 | 0 | 0 | 0 | 0 | 0 | 0 |
| 20 | FW | (Hungary) HUN | Tamás Takács | 1 | 0 | 0 | 0 | 0 | 0 | 1 | 0 |
| 77 | FW | (Hungary) HUN | Dániel Zsóri | 5 | 0 | 2 | 0 | 0 | 0 | 3 | 0 |

=== Top scorers ===
Includes all competitive matches. The list is sorted by shirt number when total goals are equal.

Last updated on 27 June 2020

| Position | Nation | Number | Name | OTP Bank Liga | Hungarian Cup | Europa League | Total |
|---|---|---|---|---|---|---|---|
| 1 | (Nigeria) | 25 | Tunde Adeniji | 9 | 3 | 0 | 12 |
| 2 | (Nigeria) | 99 | Haruna Garba | 7 | 1 | 2 | 10 |
| 3 | (Hungary) | 88 | Márk Szécsi | 9 | 0 | 0 | 9 |
| 4 | (Hungary) | 21 | Kevin Varga | 4 | 0 | 2 | 6 |
| 5 | (Hungary) | 3 | Csaba Szatmári | 2 | 0 | 1 | 3 |
| 6 | (Serbia) | 92 | Nikola Trujić | 3 | 0 | 0 | 3 |
| 7 | (Hungary) | 27 | Ádám Bódi | 3 | 0 | 0 | 3 |
| 8 | (Hungary) | 65 | Norbert Kundrák | 2 | 0 | 0 | 2 |
| 9 | (Hungary) | 8 | Dániel Tőzsér | 2 | 0 | 0 | 2 |
| 10 | (Hungary) | 2 | Ákos Kinyik | 1 | 1 | 0 | 2 |
| 11 | (Hungary) | 5 | Bence Pávkovics | 1 | 0 | 0 | 1 |
| 12 | (Hungary) | 18 | Attila Haris | 1 | 0 | 0 | 1 |
| 13 | (Ukraine) | 29 | Erik Kusnyír | 1 | 0 | 0 | 1 |
| 14 | (Hungary) | 16 | Bence Szabó | 1 | 0 | 0 | 1 |
| 15 | (Hungary) | 71 | Csaba Belényesi | 0 | 1 | 0 | 1 |
| / | / | / | Own Goals | 2 | 0 | 0 | 2 |
| | | | TOTALS | 48 | 6 | 5 | 59 |

=== Disciplinary record ===
Includes all competitive matches. Players with 1 card or more included only.

Last updated on 27 June 2020

| Position | Nation | Number | Name | OTP Bank Liga | | Hungarian Cup | | Europa League | | Total (Hu Total) | |
| Position | Nation | Number | Name | Booked | Sent off (straight red) | Booked | Sent off (straight red) | Booked | Sent off (straight red) | Booked | Sent off (straight red) |
| DF | (Hungary) | 2 | Ákos Kinyik | 13 | 0 | 1 | 0 | 0 | 0 | 14 (13) | 0 (0) |
| DF | (Hungary) | 3 | Csaba Szatmári | 4 | 0 | 0 | 0 | 0 | 0 | 4 (4) | 0 (0) |
| DF | (Hungary) | 4 | Balázs Bényei | 4 | 1 | 0 | 0 | 0 | 0 | 4 (4) | 1 (1) |
| DF | (Hungary) | 5 | Bence Pávkovics | 7 | 0 | 0 | 0 | 1 | 0 | 8 (7) | 0 (0) |
| MF | (Hungary) | 8 | Dániel Tőzsér | 4 | 0 | 0 | 0 | 1 | 0 | 5 (4) | 0 (0) |
| MF | (Hungary) | 11 | János Ferenczi | 4 | 0 | 0 | 0 | 0 | 0 | 4 (4) | 0 (0) |
| DF | (Hungary) | 15 | Szabolcs Barna | 1 | 0 | 1 | 0 | 0 | 0 | 2 (1) | 0 (0) |
| MF | (Hungary) | 18 | Attila Haris | 4 | 0 | 1 | 0 | 0 | 0 | 5 (4) | 0 (0) |
| DF | (Ukraine) | 19 | Yuriy Habovda | 4 | 0 | 0 | 0 | 0 | 0 | 4 (4) | 0 (0) |
| MF | (Hungary) | 21 | Kevin Varga | 5 | 1 | 0 | 0 | 1 | 0 | 6 (5) | 1 (1) |
| FW | (Nigeria) | 25 | Tunde Adeniji | 1 | 0 | 0 | 0 | 0 | 0 | 1 (1) | 0 (0) |
| MF | (Hungary) | 27 | Ádám Bódi | 4 | 1 | 0 | 0 | 0 | 0 | 4 (4) | 1 (1) |
| DF | (Ukraine) | 29 | Erik Kusnyír | 4 | 0 | 0 | 0 | 0 | 0 | 4 (4) | 0 (0) |
| MF | (Hungary) | 33 | Richárd Csősz | 4 | 0 | 1 | 0 | 0 | 0 | 5 (4) | 0 (0) |
| FW | (Hungary) | 65 | Norbert Kundrák | 4 | 0 | 0 | 0 | 0 | 0 | 4 (4) | 0 (0) |
| FW | (Hungary) | 77 | Dániel Zsóri | 1 | 0 | 0 | 0 | 0 | 0 | 1 (1) | 0 (0) |
| MF | (Hungary) | 77 | Péter Baráth | 1 | 0 | 0 | 0 | 0 | 0 | 1 (1) | 0 (0) |
| FW | (Hungary) | 88 | Márk Szécsi | 4 | 0 | 0 | 0 | 0 | 0 | 4 (4) | 0 (0) |
| FW | (Serbia) | 92 | Nikola Trujić | 2 | 0 | 0 | 0 | 0 | 0 | 2 (2) | 0 (0) |
| FW | (Nigeria) | 99 | Haruna Garba | 9 | 0 | 0 | 0 | 1 | 0 | 10 (9) | 0 (0) |
| | | | TOTALS | 84 | 3 | 4 | 0 | 4 | 0 | 92 (84) | 3 (3) |

=== Overall ===
| Games played | 40 (33 OTP Bank Liga, 3 Hungarian Cup and 4 Europa League) |
| Games won | 14 (11 OTP Bank Liga, 2 Hungarian Cup and 1 Europa League) |
| Games drawn | 8 (6 OTP Bank Liga, 1 Hungarian Cup and 1 Europa League) |
| Games lost | 18 (16 OTP Bank Liga, 0 Hungarian Cup and 2 Europa League) |
| Goals scored | 59 |
| Goals conceded | 66 |
| Goal difference | -7 |
| Yellow cards | 92 |
| Red cards | 3 |
| Worst discipline | (Hungary) Ákos Kinyik (14 (yellow card) , 0 (red card) ) |
| Best result | 4–0 (H) v Újpest - Nemzeti Bajnokság I - 25-1-2020 |
| Best result | 4–0 (H) v Diósgyőr - Nemzeti Bajnokság I - 21-6-2020 |
| Worst result | 1–6 (H) v Ferencváros - Nemzeti Bajnokság I - 10-11-2019 |
| Most appearances | (Hungary) János Ferenczi (37 appearances) |
| Top scorer | (Nigeria) Tunde Adeniji (12 goals) |
| Points | 49/120 (40.83%) |

Last updated: 27 June 2020

=== Attendances ===
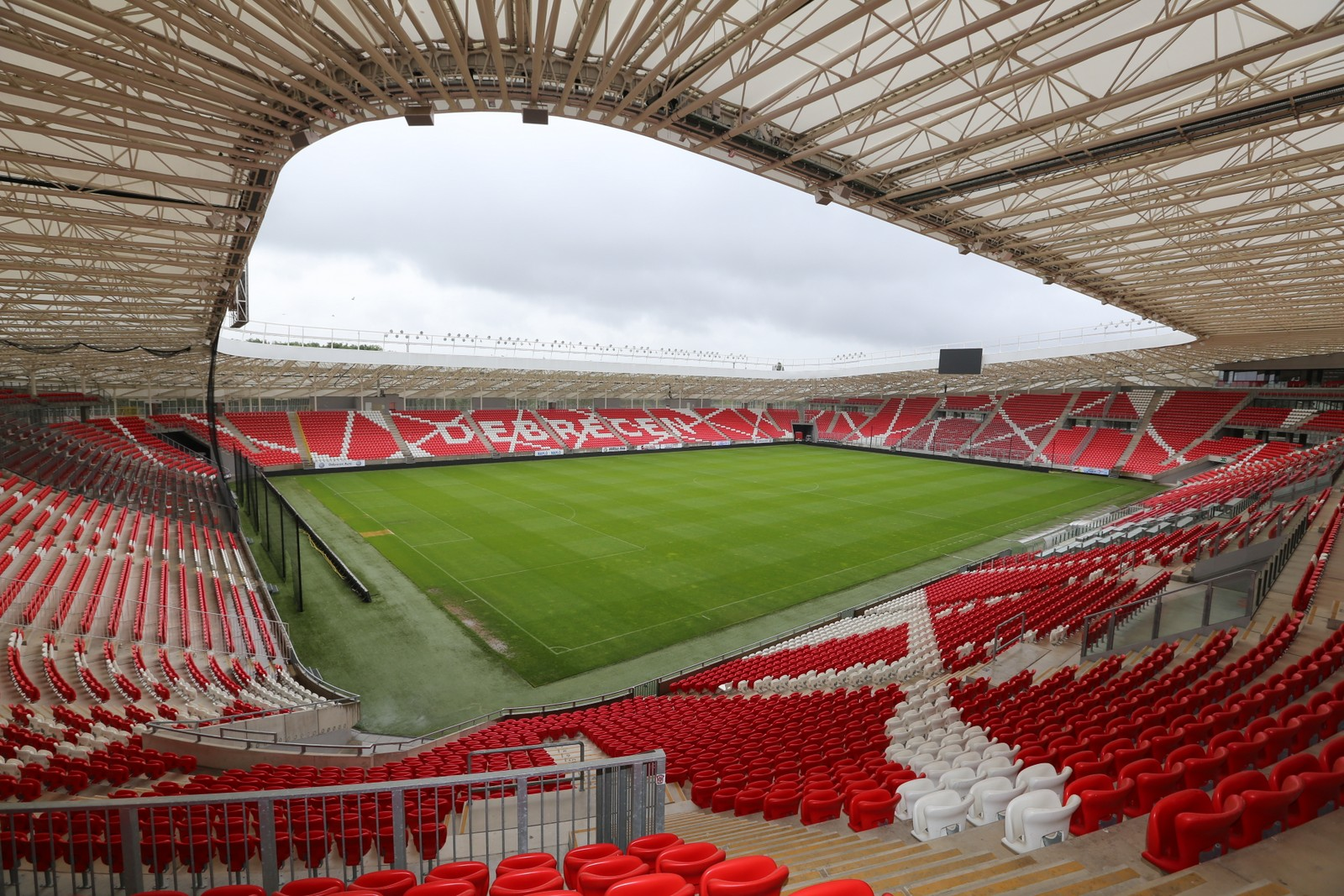
Home stadium: Nagyerdei Stadion

List of the home matches:

| Round | Against | Attadance | Date |
|---|---|---|---|
| EL-Q1 | Kukësi (Albania) | 10,250 | 11 July 2019 |
| EL-Q2 | Torino (Italy) | 15,350 | 1 August 2019 |
| NB I-2. | Kisvárda | 4,540 | 11 August 2019 |
| NB I-3. | Zalaegerszeg | 4,150 | 17 August 2019 |
| NB I-5. | Kaposvár | 4,120 | 31 August 2019 |
| NB I-7. | Puskás Akadémia | 3,250 | 28 September 2019 |
| NB I-9. | Diósgyőr | 5,460 | 19 October 2019 |
| NB I-11. | Paks | 2,650 | 2 November 2019 |
| NB I-12. | Ferencváros | 8,136 | 10 November 2019 |
| NB I-15. | Budapest Honvéd | 2,080 | 7 December 2019 |
| NB I-17. | Újpest | 2,120 | 25 January 2020 |

As of 19 October 2019
