= Avdijaj =

Avdijaj is a surname. Notable people with the surname include:

- Albion Avdijaj (born 1994), Swiss footballer
- Donis Avdijaj (born 1996), German footballer
