= Richárd Csősz =

Hungarian footballer

Personal information
- Date of birth: 22 April 1997 (age 29)
- Place of birth: Debrecen, Hungary
- Height: 1.86 m (6 ft 1 in)
- Position: Midfielder

Youth career
- 2003–2008: Debrecen
- 2008–2009: Létavértes
- 2009–2014: Vasas
- 2014–2016: Debrecen

Senior career*
Years	Team	Apps	(Gls)
2016–2021	Debrecen	47	(1)
2016–2020	→ Debrecen II	40	(15)
2020	→ Paks (loan)	6	(0)
2021	→ Kazincbarcika (loan)	13	(0)
2021–2022	Tiszakécske	9	(0)
2022–2023	Nyíregyháza	26	(0)
2023–2024	BVSC-Zugló	17	(0)
- * Club domestic league appearances and goals as of 3 July 2024

Richárd Csősz (born 22 April 1997) is a Hungarian football player.

== Career ==
=== Debrecen ===
On 29 July 2017, Csősz played his first match for Debrecen in a 1–1 draw against Paks in the Hungarian League.

=== Nyíregyháza ===
On 29 July 2022, Csősz signed with Nyíregyháza, initially until the end of 2022.

== Career statistics ==
As of 7 November 2020

Appearances and goals by club, season and competition
Club	Season	League			Cup		Europe		Total	
Club	Season	Division	Apps	Goals	Apps	Goals	Apps	Goals	Apps	Goals
Debrecen II
Debrecen II	2015–16	Nemzeti Bajnokság III	3	0	0	0	—		3	0
Debrecen II	2016–17	Nemzeti Bajnokság III	27	5	0	0	—		27	5
Debrecen II	2017–18	Megyei Bajnokság I	6	6	—		—		6	6
Debrecen II	2018–19	Megyei Bajnokság I	3	3	—		—		3	3
Debrecen II	2019–20	Nemzeti Bajnokság III	1	1	—		—		1	1
Debrecen II	Total		40	15	0	0	0	0	40	15
Debrecen
Debrecen	2017–18	Nemzeti Bajnokság I	11	0	5	0	—		16	0
Debrecen	2018–19	Nemzeti Bajnokság I	18	1	5	1	—		23	2
Debrecen	2019–20	Nemzeti Bajnokság I	18	0	3	0	3	0	24	0
Debrecen	Total		47	1	13	1	3	0	63	2
Paks	2020–21	Nemzeti Bajnokság I	4	0	1	0	—		5	0
Career total			91	16	14	1	3	0	108	17
