= Krisztián Kuti =

Hungarian footballer

Personal information
- Date of birth: 4 December 1992 (age 33)
- Place of birth: Debrecen, Hungary
- Height: 1.83 m (6 ft 0 in)
- Position: Right back

Team information
- Current team: Cegléd
- Number: 7

Youth career
- 2001–2010: Debrecen

Senior career*
Years	Team	Apps	(Gls)
2010–2012	Létavértes	57	(3)
2012–2020	Debrecen	10	(1)
2012–2020	→ Debrecen II	103	(25)
2013–2014	→ Létavértes (loan)	25	(1)
2017	→ Cigánd (loan)	15	(1)
2020	Szeged	7	(0)
2020–	Cegléd	5	(0)
- * Club domestic league appearances and goals as of 11:48, 6 October 2020 (UTC)

Krisztián Kuti (born 4 December 1992) is a Hungarian football right back who plays for Ceglédi VSE.

== Career statistics ==
As of 11 December 2019

Appearances and goals by club, season and competition
Club	Season	League		Cup		League Cup		Europe		Total	
Club	Season	Apps	Goals	Apps	Goals	Apps	Goals	Apps	Goals	Apps	Goals
Létavértes
Létavértes	2010–11	29	1	0	0	–	–	–	–	29	1
Létavértes	2011–12	28	2	0	0	–	–	–	–	28	2
Létavértes	2013–14	25	1	0	0	–	–	–	–	25	1
Létavértes	Total	82	4	0	0	0	0	0	0	82	4
Debrecen II
Debrecen II	2012–13	28	0	0	0	–	–	–	–	28	0
Debrecen II	2014–15	15	1	0	0	–	–	–	–	15	1
Debrecen II	2015–16	12	0	0	0	–	–	–	–	12	0
Debrecen II	2016–17	7	0	0	0	–	–	–	–	7	0
Debrecen II	2017–18	17	21	0	0	–	–	–	–	17	21
Debrecen II	2018–19	19	3	0	0	–	–	–	–	19	3
Debrecen II	2019–20	5	0	0	0	–	–	–	–	5	0
Debrecen II	Total	103	25	0	0	0	0	0	0	103	25
Cigánd
Cigánd	2016–17	15	1	0	0	–	–	–	–	15	1
Cigánd	Total	15	1	0	0	0	0	0	0	15	1
Debrecen
Debrecen	2012–13	0	0	3	0	0	0	0	0	3	0
Debrecen	2014–15	0	0	0	0	3	0	0	0	8	0
Debrecen	2016–17	5	1	0	0	–	–	0	0	5	1
Debrecen	2017–18	4	0	6	0	–	–	–	–	10	0
Debrecen	2018–19	1	0	3	1	–	–	–	–	4	1
Debrecen	2019–20	0	0	2	0	–	–	0	0	2	0
Debrecen	Total	10	1	14	1	3	0	0	0	27	2
Career total		210	31	14	1	3	0	0	0	227	32
