= 2018–19 Megyei Bajnokság I =

Megyei Bajnokság I
- Season: 2018–19

The 2018–19 Megyei Bajnokság I includes the championships of 20 counties in Hungary. It is the fourth tier of the Hungarian football league system.

== Tables ==
=== Bács-Kiskun ===
Pos	Team	Pld	W	D	L	GF	GA	GD	Pts	Promotion or relegation
1	Kiskunfélegyháza (C)	26	19	6	1	99	35	+64	63	
2	Jánoshalma	26	17	5	4	75	21	+54	56	
3	Kiskőrös	26	16	6	4	57	36	+21	54	
4	Kalocsa	26	13	9	4	61	33	+28	48	
5	Kecel	26	12	5	9	58	47	+11	41	
6	Akasztó	26	11	5	10	50	45	+5	38	
7	Harta	26	10	6	10	50	67	−17	36	
8	Tiszakécske II	26	10	3	13	51	70	−19	33	
9	Kiskunhalas	26	9	5	12	38	45	−7	32	
10	Szabadszállás	26	8	8	10	51	72	−21	32	
11	Soltvadkert	26	7	4	15	44	59	−15	25	
12	Bácsalmás	26	5	8	13	57	73	−16	23	
13	Lajosmizse	26	4	6	16	45	72	−27	18	
14	Kelebia (R)	26	1	4	21	21	82	−61	7	Relegation to Megyei Bajnokság III

Source: Hungarian Football Federation
(C) Champions; (R) Relegated

=== Baranya ===
Pos	Team	Pld	W	D	L	GF	GA	GD	Pts	Promotion or relegation
1	Pécsvárad (C)	26	21	3	2	84	13	+71	66	
2	PTE-PEAC	26	18	3	5	80	37	+43	57	
3	Szederkény	26	16	3	7	52	35	+17	51	
4	Siklós	26	15	4	7	49	29	+20	49	
5	Mohács	26	12	5	9	52	35	+17	41	
6	Szentlőrinc II	26	12	2	12	49	46	+3	38	
7	Komló	26	11	5	10	48	46	+2	38	
8	Pécsi VSK	26	11	5	10	41	39	+2	38	
9	Villány	26	11	5	10	41	41	0	38	
10	Sellye	26	10	2	14	35	57	−22	32	
11	Boda	26	5	4	17	28	74	−46	19	
12	Lovászhetény	26	4	7	15	33	65	−32	19	
13	Harkány	26	3	7	16	29	71	−42	16	
14	Bóly	26	4	3	19	32	65	−33	15	
15	Szászvár (Note: Szászvár withdrew from the championship.) (D)	0	0	0	0	0	0	0	0	Excluded

Source: Hungarian Football Federation
(C) Champions; (D) Disqualified

=== Békés ===
==== Regular stage ====
Pos	Team	Pld	W	D	L	GF	GA	GD	Pts	Promotion or relegation
1	Körösladány	20	13	3	4	42	20	+22	42	Qualification for promotion group
2	Kondoros	20	13	3	4	39	24	+15	42	Qualification for promotion group
3	Békéscsaba II	20	12	4	4	38	16	+22	40	Qualification for promotion group
4	Szarvas	20	12	3	5	54	24	+30	39	Qualification for promotion group
5	Szeghalom	20	9	8	3	43	23	+20	35	Qualification for promotion group
6	Nagyszénás	20	9	3	8	33	39	−6	30	Qualification for promotion group
7	Gyula	20	7	0	13	28	33	−5	21	Qualification for relegation group
8	Mezőhegyes	20	6	2	12	32	47	−15	20	Qualification for relegation group
9	Vésztő	20	4	5	11	19	35	−16	17	Qualification for relegation group
10	Jamina	20	3	5	12	13	38	−25	14	Qualification for relegation group
11	OMTK-ULE	20	3	2	15	17	59	−42	11	Qualification for relegation group

Source: Hungarian Football Federation

==== Promotion group ====
Pos	Team	Pld	W	D	L	GF	GA	GD	Pts	Promotion or relegation
1	Békéscsaba II (C)	30	20	6	4	63	27	+36	66	Qualification for promotion play-offs
2	Körösladány	30	19	6	5	72	28	+44	63	
3	Kondoros (R)	30	16	7	7	54	40	+14	55	Relegation and not competed in any division next season
4	Szarvas	30	16	6	8	79	42	+37	54	
5	Nagyszénás	30	11	4	15	48	73	−25	37	
6	Szeghalom	30	9	9	12	56	59	−3	36	

Source: Hungarian Football Federation
(C) Champions; (R) Relegated

==== Relegation group ====
Pos	Team	Pld	W	D	L	GF	GA	GD	Pts	Relegation
1	Gyula	28	13	1	14	47	39	+8	40	
2	Mezőhegyes (R)	28	11	2	15	62	62	0	35	Relegation to Megyei Bajnokság II
3	Jamina	28	7	5	16	30	48	−18	26	
4	OMTK-ULE	28	6	4	18	29	72	−43	22	
5	Vésztő (R)	28	4	6	18	24	74	−50	18	Relegation to Megyei Bajnokság II

Source: Hungarian Football Federation
(R) Relegated

=== Borsod-Abaúj-Zemplén ===
Pos	Team	Pld	W	D	L	GF	GA	GD	Pts	Promotion or relegation
1	Ózd (C, P)	26	20	4	2	78	22	+56	64	Qualification for promotion play-offs
2	Hidasnémeti	26	14	7	5	63	35	+28	49	
3	Mezőkövesd II	26	14	3	9	78	49	+29	45	
4	Bánhorváti	26	14	4	8	65	42	+23	44 (Note: Bánhorváti were deducted 2 points)	
5	Felsőzsolca	26	12	7	7	57	37	+20	43	
6	Bőcs	26	12	3	11	52	62	−10	39	
7	Edelény	26	10	8	8	67	50	+17	38	
8	Gesztely	26	11	4	11	53	55	−2	37	
9	Bükkzsérc (R)	26	10	3	13	57	75	−18	33	Relegation to Megyei Bajnokság II
10	Bogács	26	9	6	11	36	50	−14	33	
11	Encs	26	9	5	12	42	48	−6	32	
12	Mád	26	6	12	8	48	48	0	30	
13	Parasznya (R)	26	2	6	18	24	79	−55	12	Relegation to Megyei Bajnokság II
14	Szerencs	26	2	2	22	28	96	−68	8	
15	Onga (Note: Onga withdrew from the championship after being unable to field a team due to a shortage of players.) (D)	0	0	0	0	0	0	0	0	Excluded

Source: Hungarian Football Federation
(C) Champions; (D) Disqualified; (P) Promoted; (R) Relegated

=== Budapest ===
Pos	Team	Pld	W	D	L	GF	GA	GD	Pts	Promotion or relegation
1	Kelen (C, P)	30	23	4	3	90	16	+74	73	Qualification for promotion play-offs
2	Újpest II	30	21	8	1	108	17	+91	71	
3	Rákospalota	30	21	7	2	83	9	+74	70	
4	Unione	30	20	4	6	65	37	+28	64	
5	Fővárosi Vízművek	30	16	5	9	68	39	+29	53	
6	Testvériség	30	14	7	9	56	49	+7	49	
7	Gázgyár	30	14	5	11	50	46	+4	47	
8	Budafok II	30	14	4	12	74	60	+14	46	
9	SZAC	30	9	7	14	48	64	−16	34	
10	Svábhegy	30	8	9	13	47	74	−27	33	
11	43. Sz. Építők	30	9	4	17	50	67	−17	31	
12	Pestszentimre (R)	30	7	9	14	49	62	−13	30	Relegation to Megyei Bajnokság II
13	Ikarus	30	7	8	15	34	62	−28	29	
14	Csep-Gól	30	6	6	18	24	56	−32	24	
15	RAFC (R)	30	4	1	25	23	102	−79	13	Relegation to Megyei Bajnokság II
16	Újbuda (R)	30	2	2	26	23	132	−109	8	Relegation to Megyei Bajnokság II

Source: Hungarian Football Federation
(C) Champions; (P) Promoted; (R) Relegated

=== Csongrád ===
Pos	Team	Pld	W	D	L	GF	GA	GD	Pts	Promotion or relegation
1	Algyő (C)	28	22	2	4	72	18	+54	68	
2	Tiszasziget	28	20	4	4	86	17	+69	64	
3	Szegedi VSE	28	19	4	5	89	25	+64	61	
4	Bordány	28	16	3	9	63	35	+28	51	
5	Röszke	28	16	1	11	59	39	+20	49	
6	Hódmezővásárhely II (R)	28	15	2	11	67	58	+9	47	Relegation to Megyei Bajnokság II
7	Kiskundorozsma	28	13	3	12	37	37	0	42	
8	Szentes	28	12	4	12	36	41	−5	40	
9	Csongrád	28	12	2	14	39	48	−9	38	
10	Szőreg (R)	28	11	5	12	37	44	−7	37 (Note: Szőreg were deducted 1 point)	Relegation to Megyei Bajnokság IV
11	Újszeged	28	9	3	16	41	73	−32	30	
12	Makó II (R)	28	7	7	14	36	55	−19	28	Relegation to Megyei Bajnokság II
13	Székkutas	28	4	6	18	36	87	−51	18	
14	Zsombó	28	4	4	20	34	85	−51	16	
15	FK 1899 Szeged (R)	28	3	4	21	32	102	−70	13	Relegation to Megyei Bajnokság II

Source: Hungarian Football Federation
(C) Champions; (R) Relegated

=== Fejér ===
Pos	Team	Pld	W	D	L	GF	GA	GD	Pts	Promotion or relegation
1	Bicske (C, P)	28	23	3	2	98	27	+71	72	Qualification for promotion play-offs
2	Sárosd	28	19	3	6	61	35	+26	60	
3	Mór	28	17	5	6	82	32	+50	56	
4	Gárdony	28	17	2	9	69	37	+32	53	
5	Ercsi	28	15	3	10	64	48	+16	48	
6	Főnix	28	15	2	11	66	50	+16	47	
7	Ikarus-Maroshegy	28	14	5	9	56	40	+16	47	
8	Sárbogárd	28	13	6	9	66	52	+14	45	
9	Tordas	28	12	4	12	49	54	−5	40	
10	Mezőfalva (R)	28	10	5	13	55	69	−14	35	Relegation to Megyei Bajnokság III
11	Lajoskomárom	28	9	5	14	46	67	−21	32	
12	Kisláng	28	4	8	16	35	61	−26	20	
13	Martonvásár	28	4	6	18	30	81	−51	18	
14	Baracs (R)	28	4	5	19	27	64	−37	17	Relegation to Megyei Bajnokság II
15	Enying	28	1	4	23	17	104	−87	7	
16	Polgárdi (Note: On 13 September 2018, Polgárdi withdrew from the championship. The club returned to league competition the following season by entering the Megyei Bajnokság III.) (D, R)	0	0	0	0	0	0	0	0	Exclution and relegation to Megyei Bajnokság III

Source: Hungarian Football Federation
(C) Champions; (D) Disqualified; (P) Promoted; (R) Relegated

=== Győr-Moson-Sopron ===
Pos	Team	Pld	W	D	L	GF	GA	GD	Pts	Promotion or relegation
1	Lipót (C, P)	30	28	2	0	190	10	+180	86	Qualification for promotion play-offs
2	Csorna	30	24	3	3	118	16	+102	75	
3	SC Sopron	30	21	2	7	117	44	+73	65	
4	Gyirmót II	30	15	10	5	111	37	+74	55	
5	Üstökös	30	16	6	8	81	39	+42	54	
6	Öttevény	30	16	4	10	80	52	+28	52	
7	Jánossomorja	30	15	7	8	84	38	+46	52	
8	Kapuvár	30	15	4	11	84	48	+36	49	
9	Győrszentiván	30	12	4	14	72	71	+1	40	
10	Gönyű	30	11	4	15	62	56	+6	37	
11	Nyúl	30	10	5	15	69	64	+5	35	
12	Pannonhalma	30	10	3	17	76	81	−5	32 (Note: Pannonhalma were deducted 1 point)	
13	Beled	30	9	5	16	69	57	+12	32	
14	Lébény	30	5	2	23	36	106	−70	17	
15	Soproni FAC	30	1	1	28	17	195	−178	4	
16	Fertőszentmiklós (R)	30	1	0	29	6	358	−352	3	Relegation to Megyei Bajnokság II

Source: Hungarian Football Federation
(C) Champions; (P) Promoted; (R) Relegated

=== Hajdú-Bihar ===
Pos	Team	Pld	W	D	L	GF	GA	GD	Pts	Promotion or relegation
1	Debreceni VSC II (C, P)	30	26	2	2	189	25	+164	80	Qualification for promotion play-offs
2	Hajdúböszörmény	30	24	3	3	104	22	+82	75	
3	Sárrétudvari	30	21	4	5	99	55	+44	67	
4	Nyíradony	30	21	2	7	86	44	+42	64 (Note: Nyíradony were deducted 1 point)	
5	Hajdúnánás	30	16	3	11	66	39	+27	51	
6	Hajdúszoboszló	30	14	3	13	83	56	+27	45	
7	Monostorpályi	30	12	8	10	66	77	−11	44	
8	Derecske	30	11	7	12	52	66	−14	40	
9	Berettyóújfalu	30	11	5	14	67	57	+10	38	
10	Debreceni EAC II	30	11	2	17	54	91	−37	35	
11	Hajdúsámson	30	10	4	16	54	80	−26	34	
12	Hajdúhadház	30	9	3	18	54	98	−44	30	
13	Hosszúpályi	30	9	2	19	54	110	−56	25 (Note: Hosszúpályi were deducted 4 points)	
14	Debreceni ASE	30	5	5	20	43	98	−55	19 (Note: Debreceni ASE were deducted 1 point)	
15	Vámospércs	30	5	4	21	47	118	−71	19	
16	Kaba	30	4	5	21	41	123	−82	16 (Note: Kaba were deducted 1 point)	

Source: Hungarian Football Federation
(C) Champions; (P) Promoted

=== Heves ===
Pos	Team	Pld	W	D	L	GF	GA	GD	Pts	Promotion or relegation
1	Hatvan (C, P)	30	27	3	0	119	23	+96	84	Qualification for promotion play-offs
2	Lőrinci	30	18	6	6	79	40	+39	60	
3	Pétervására	30	18	4	8	69	34	+35	58	
4	Energia	30	16	9	5	66	43	+23	57	
5	Gyöngyöshalász	30	16	6	8	59	52	+7	54	
6	Marshall-Andornaktálya	30	14	6	10	66	51	+15	48	
7	Besenyőtelek	30	13	6	11	46	47	−1	45	
8	Felsőtárkány	30	13	5	12	40	39	+1	44	
9	Heréd	30	12	4	14	57	68	−11	40	
10	Heves	30	11	4	15	51	72	−21	37	
11	Egerszalók	30	8	10	12	41	57	−16	34	
12	Maklár	30	7	7	16	44	65	−21	28	
13	Füzesabony	30	7	5	18	48	68	−20	26	
14	Borsodnádasd (R)	30	6	4	20	47	94	−47	22	Relegation to Megyei Bajnokság II
15	Bélkő	30	4	8	18	30	77	−47	20	
16	Eger II	30	3	7	20	33	65	−32	16	

Source: Hungarian Football Federation
(C) Champions; (P) Promoted; (R) Relegated

=== Jász-Nagykun-Szolnok ===
Pos	Team	Pld	W	D	L	GF	GA	GD	Pts	Promotion or relegation
1	Tiszafüred (C)	30	26	3	1	119	20	+99	81	Qualification for promotion play-offs
2	Törökszentmiklós	30	20	5	5	91	43	+48	65	
3	Mezőtúr	30	19	6	5	79	37	+42	63	
4	Karcag	30	17	4	9	62	42	+20	55	
5	Jászárokszállás	30	16	6	8	65	40	+25	54	
6	Újszász	30	14	5	11	56	34	+22	47	
7	Csépa (R)	30	13	8	9	67	68	−1	47	Relegation to Megyei Bajnokság II
8	Tószeg	30	14	4	12	52	39	+13	46	
9	Jászfényszaru	30	15	5	10	54	51	+3	43 (Note: Jászfényszaru were deducted 7 points)	
10	Szajol	30	11	4	15	66	74	−8	37	
11	Kisújszállás	30	9	4	17	55	68	−13	31	
12	Jászkisér	30	7	7	16	50	89	−39	28	
13	Fegyvernek	30	7	6	17	36	66	−30	27	
14	Jánoshida	30	5	5	20	29	75	−46	20	
15	Kunhegyes	30	5	4	21	37	92	−55	19	
16	Rákóczifalva (R)	30	3	2	25	28	108	−80	10 (Note: Rákóczifalva were deducted 1 point)	Relegation to Megyei Bajnokság II

Source: Hungarian Football Federation
(C) Champions; (R) Relegated

=== Komárom-Esztergom ===
Pos	Team	Pld	W	D	L	GF	GA	GD	Pts	Promotion or relegation
1	Tatabánya (C)	26	24	1	1	157	11	+146	73	Qualification for promotion play-offs
2	Oroszlány	26	19	3	4	108	35	+73	60	
3	Zsámbék	26	17	4	5	76	25	+51	55	
4	Sárisáp	26	15	3	8	56	32	+24	47 (Note: Sárisáp were deducted 1 point)	
5	Nyergesújfalu	26	14	1	11	67	50	+17	43	
6	Koppánymonostor	26	13	3	10	60	30	+30	42	
7	Kecskéd	26	11	6	9	68	70	−2	39	
8	Esztergom	26	11	5	10	64	48	+16	38	
9	Bábolna	26	10	4	12	54	58	−4	34	
10	Vértessomló	26	10	3	13	70	65	+5	33	
11	Vértesszőlős	26	9	2	15	47	56	−9	29	
12	Tata	26	5	2	19	63	80	−17	17	
13	Nagyigmánd	26	4	3	19	31	99	−68	15	
14	Ács (R)	26	0	0	26	20	282	−262	0	Relegation to Megyei Bajnokság II

Source: Hungarian Football Federation
(C) Champions; (R) Relegated

=== Nógrád ===
==== Regular stage ====
Pos	Team	Pld	W	D	L	GF	GA	GD	Pts	Qualification
1	Balassagyarmat	20	16	4	0	55	7	+48	52	Qualification for 1st–4th place playoffs
2	Berkenye	20	12	4	4	45	26	+19	40	Qualification for 1st–4th place playoffs
3	Cered	20	10	3	7	45	37	+8	33	Qualification for 1st–4th place playoffs
4	Mátraterenye	20	9	6	5	42	29	+13	33	Qualification for 1st–4th place playoffs
5	Karancslapujtő	20	9	5	6	36	31	+5	31 (Note: Karancslapujtő were deducted 1 point)	Qualification for 5th–8th place playoffs
6	Szécsény	20	8	4	8	31	23	+8	28	Qualification for 5th–8th place playoffs
7	Palotás	20	8	4	8	33	29	+4	28	Qualification for 5th–8th place playoffs
8	Pásztó	20	5	6	9	31	48	−17	20 (Note: Pásztó were deducted 1 point)	Qualification for 5th–8th place playoffs
9	Érsekvadkert	20	5	4	11	28	49	−21	19	Qualification for 9th–11th place playoffs
10	Héhalom	20	4	5	11	29	50	−21	17	Qualification for 9th–11th place playoffs
11	Rimóc	20	1	1	18	18	64	−46	4	Qualification for 9th–11th place playoffs

Source: Hungarian Football Federation

==== 1st–4th place playoffs ====
Pos	Team	Pld	W	D	L	GF	GA	GD	Pts	Promotion
1	Balassagyarmat (C, P)	26	20	5	1	71	13	+58	65	Qualification for promotion play-offs
2	Berkenye	26	14	5	7	52	34	+18	47	
3	Mátraterenye	26	13	6	7	54	42	+12	45	
4	Cered	26	10	5	11	53	53	0	35	

Source: Hungarian Football Federation
(C) Champions; (P) Promoted

==== 5th–8th place playoffs ====
Pos	Team	Pld	W	D	L	GF	GA	GD	Pts
1	Palotás	26	12	4	10	50	41	+9	40
2	Szécsény	26	12	4	10	44	35	+9	40
3	Karancslapujtő	26	9	5	12	46	56	−10	32
4	Pásztó	26	9	6	11	47	55	−8	30 (Note: Pásztó were deducted 3 points)

Source: Hungarian Football Federation

==== 9th–11th place playoffs ====
Pos	Team	Pld	W	D	L	GF	GA	GD	Pts
1	Érsekvadkert	24	8	4	12	46	57	−11	28
2	Héhalom	24	6	5	13	39	63	−24	23
3	Rimóc	24	2	1	21	23	76	−53	7

Source: Hungarian Football Federation

=== Pest ===
Pos	Team	Pld	W	D	L	GF	GA	GD	Pts	Promotion or relegation
1	Dabas-Gyón (C, P)	30	21	5	4	70	20	+50	68	Qualification for promotion play-offs
2	Gödöllő	30	15	6	9	44	30	+14	51	
3	Nagykáta	30	15	5	10	60	42	+18	50	
4	Törtel	30	15	4	11	61	45	+16	49	
5	Pilis	30	14	6	10	48	39	+9	48	
6	Vecsés	30	13	9	8	41	27	+14	48	
7	Dunakeszi	30	13	7	10	51	45	+6	46	
8	Százhalombatta	30	11	5	14	36	42	−6	38	
9	Biatorbágy	30	10	8	12	44	51	−7	38	
10	Tököl	30	10	6	14	45	52	−7	36	
11	Dunavarsány	30	10	7	13	42	63	−21	36 (Note: Dunavarsány were deducted 1 point)	
12	Maglód	30	9	8	13	40	48	−8	35	
13	Szentendre	30	9	6	15	47	67	−20	33	
14	Nagykőrös	30	9	6	15	28	48	−20	33	
15	Felsőpakony (R)	30	8	8	14	50	73	−23	32	Relegation to Megyei Bajnokság II
16	Tápiószecső (R)	30	8	4	18	39	54	−15	28	Relegation to Megyei Bajnokság II

Source: Hungarian Football Federation
(C) Champions; (P) Promoted; (R) Relegated

=== Somogy ===
Pos	Team	Pld	W	D	L	GF	GA	GD	Pts	Promotion or relegation
1	Balatonlelle (C, P)	30	27	2	1	140	15	+125	83	Qualification for promotion play-offs
2	Nagyatád	30	21	2	7	90	30	+60	65	
3	Hetes	30	20	5	5	74	27	+47	65	
4	Nagybajom	30	18	3	9	79	43	+36	57	
5	Somogysárd	30	17	3	10	82	71	+11	54	
6	Balatoni Vasas	30	16	4	10	63	35	+28	52	
7	Magyaregres	30	14	7	9	54	40	+14	49	
8	Tab	30	14	3	13	59	52	+7	45	
9	Balatonkeresztúr-Balatonmáriafürdő	30	13	3	14	56	64	−8	42	
10	Toponár	30	13	3	14	51	61	−10	42	
11	Babócsa (R)	30	12	3	15	49	70	−21	39	Relegation and not competed in any division next season
12	Kadarkút	30	10	5	15	39	57	−18	35	
13	Csurgó	30	8	1	21	40	101	−61	25	
14	Marcali	30	5	5	20	28	82	−54	20	
15	Balatonföldvár (R)	30	3	3	24	27	87	−60	12	Relegation to Megyei Bajnokság II
16	Segesd	30	2	2	26	30	126	−96	8	

Source: Hungarian Football Federation
(C) Champions; (P) Promoted; (R) Relegated

=== Szabolcs-Szatmár-Bereg ===
Pos	Team	Pld	W	D	L	GF	GA	GD	Pts	Promotion or relegation
1	Nagyecsed (C)	30	18	6	6	52	32	+20	60	
2	Ibrány	30	17	8	5	69	25	+44	59	
3	Nagyhalász	30	17	6	7	63	43	+20	57	
4	Nyírgulaj	30	16	8	6	60	29	+31	56	
5	Mándok	30	16	6	8	65	39	+26	54	
6	Vásárosnamény	30	14	7	9	67	52	+15	49	
7	Baktalórántháza	30	13	4	13	74	61	+13	43	
8	Balkány	30	12	5	13	51	56	−5	41	
9	Tarpa	30	12	4	14	54	62	−8	40	
10	Tiszakanyár	30	11	7	12	56	63	−7	40	
11	Kisvárda II	30	9	10	11	43	40	+3	37	
12	Mátészalka	30	9	6	15	43	52	−9	33	
13	Fehérgyarmat	30	9	6	15	48	64	−16	33	
14	Csenger (R)	30	8	4	18	48	73	−25	28	Relegation to Megyei Bajnokság II
15	Gyulaháza (R)	30	6	7	17	34	74	−40	25	Relegation to Megyei Bajnokság II
16	Tiszavasvári (R)	30	4	4	22	37	99	−62	15 (Note: Tiszavasvári were deducted 1 point)	Relegation to Megyei Bajnokság II

Source: Hungarian Football Federation
(C) Champions; (R) Relegated

=== Tolna ===
Pos	Team	Pld	W	D	L	GF	GA	GD	Pts	Promotion or relegation
1	Bonyhád (C)	30	22	5	3	106	22	+84	71	
2	Tolna	30	22	3	5	87	31	+56	69	
3	Tamási	30	20	6	4	84	31	+53	66	
4	Dombóvár	30	20	5	5	75	38	+37	65	
5	Majos	30	12	7	11	60	48	+12	43	
6	Dunaföldvár	30	12	3	15	57	55	+2	39	
7	Szedres	30	10	3	17	65	85	−20	33	
8	Tevel	30	8	7	15	49	68	−19	31	
9	Bátaszék	30	8	2	20	52	89	−37	26	
10	Kakasd	30	8	1	21	45	111	−66	24 (Note: Kakasd were deducted 1 point)	
11	Kölesd (R)	30	1	2	27	21	123	−102	1 (Note: Kölesd were deducted 4 points)	Relegation to Megyei Bajnokság II

Source: Hungarian Football Federation
(C) Champions; (R) Relegated

=== Vas ===
Pos	Team	Pld	W	D	L	GF	GA	GD	Pts	Promotion or relegation
1	Celldömölk (C)	30	23	6	1	76	11	+65	75	
2	Körmend	30	17	6	7	73	37	+36	57	
3	Király	30	17	6	7	64	38	+26	57	
4	Szentgotthárd	30	17	4	9	47	31	+16	55	
5	Lukácsháza	30	15	4	11	66	55	+11	49	
6	Vép	30	14	6	10	53	32	+21	48	
7	Vasvár	30	13	4	13	61	66	−5	43	
8	Répcelak	30	11	6	13	37	46	−9	39	
9	Csepreg	30	10	9	11	37	48	−11	39	
10	Egyházasrádóc	30	10	8	12	42	37	+5	38	
11	Rábapaty	30	10	8	12	38	54	−16	38	
12	Kőszeg	30	8	7	15	46	71	−25	31	
13	Rum	30	7	9	14	52	61	−9	30	
14	Jánosháza	30	6	8	16	49	79	−30	26	
15	Vasszécseny (R)	30	6	5	19	37	77	−40	23	Relegation to Megyei Bajnokság II
16	Ikervár (R)	30	3	10	17	33	68	−35	18 (Note: Ikervár were deducted 1 point)	Relegation to Megyei Bajnokság II

Source: Hungarian Football Federation
(C) Champions; (R) Relegated

=== Veszprém ===
Pos	Team	Pld	W	D	L	GF	GA	GD	Pts	Promotion or relegation
1	Veszprém (C, P)	30	26	3	1	194	13	+181	81	Qualification for promotion play-offs
2	Balatonfüred	30	25	2	3	127	15	+112	77	
3	Úrkút	30	24	2	4	85	29	+56	74	
4	Tihany	30	20	5	5	102	43	+59	65	
5	Balatonalmádi	30	15	6	9	65	35	+30	51	
6	Ajka Kristály	30	15	9	6	82	55	+27	47 (Note: Ajka Kristály were deducted 7 points)	
7	Gyulafirátót	30	11	9	10	50	50	0	41 (Note: Gyulafirátót were deducted 1 point)	
8	Sümeg	30	10	5	15	48	75	−27	34 (Note: Sümeg were deducted 1 point)	
9	Magyarpolány	30	10	3	17	60	92	−32	33	
10	Devecser	30	9	6	15	46	80	−34	33	
11	Várpalota	30	8	7	15	47	86	−39	31	
12	Fűzfő	30	8	6	16	48	70	−22	30	
13	Csetény	30	8	6	16	60	105	−45	30	
14	Tapolca	30	7	2	21	46	97	−51	23	
15	Herend	30	5	3	22	38	107	−69	18	
16	Zirc (R)	30	2	0	28	19	165	−146	6	Relegation to Megyei Bajnokság III

Source: Hungarian Football Federation
(C) Champions; (P) Promoted; (R) Relegated

=== Zala ===
Pos	Team	Pld	W	D	L	GF	GA	GD	Pts	Promotion or relegation
1	Hévíz (C, P)	30	29	1	0	118	14	+104	88	Qualification for promotion play-offs
2	Zalaszentgrót	30	21	2	7	100	39	+61	65	
3	Semjénháza	30	20	0	10	65	43	+22	60	
4	Gellénháza	30	19	2	9	99	56	+43	59	
5	Csesztreg	30	17	6	7	87	52	+35	57	
6	Teskánd	30	18	2	10	71	34	+37	56	
7	Szepetnek	30	18	2	10	74	40	+34	56	
8	Gyenesdiás	30	18	0	12	72	49	+23	53 (Note: Gyenesdiás were deducted 1 point)	
9	Zalalövő	30	11	5	14	37	46	−9	37 (Note: Zalalövő were deducted 1 point)	
10	Lenti	30	10	5	15	65	78	−13	35	
11	Zalakomár	30	10	2	18	52	66	−14	32	
12	Police-Ola	30	10	0	20	46	95	−49	30	
13	Csács	30	7	6	17	42	71	−29	27	
14	Becsehely (R)	30	4	4	22	31	78	−47	16	Relegation to Megyei Bajnokság II
15	Kiskanizsa	30	4	4	22	36	98	−62	16	
16	Keszthely (R)	30	2	3	25	16	152	−136	9	Relegation to Megyei Bajnokság II

Source: Hungarian Football Federation
(C) Champions; (P) Promoted; (R) Relegated

== Promotion play-offs ==
The promotion play-offs featured the remaining 14 county champions after Kiskunfélegyháza, Algyő, Nagyecsed, and Celldömölk failed to obtain an NB III licence, while Pécsvárad and Bonyhád declined to participate. As a result, Hatvan, Lipót, Veszprém, Balassagyarmat, Ózd, and Dabas-Gyón were drawn to receive byes and were promoted to Nemzeti Bajnokság III automatically. The remaining four promotion places were decided by two-legged play-offs, in which Bicske, Debreceni VSC II, Kelen, and Balatonlelle secured promotion by defeating Tatabánya, Tiszafüred, Békéscsaba II, and Hévíz, respectively.

Despite losing the promotion play-offs, Hévíz was later invited to compete in the third tier as the highest-ranked unsuccessful play-off team, while Tállya was readmitted as the highest-ranked relegated club after Nyírbátor and SZEOL did not enter the league.

=== Matches ===
Team 1	Agg.	Team 2	1st leg	2nd leg
Bicske	1–0	Tatabánya	0–0	1–0
Tiszafüred	0–8	Debreceni VSC II	0–2	0–6
Hévíz	1–1 (a)	Balatonlelle	1–1	0–0
Békéscsaba II	2–3	Kelen	1–1	1–2

==== Details ====
All times Central European Summer Time (UTC+2)

9 June 2019
17:30

Bicske	0–0	Tatabánya
	Report

Bicske Sporttelep, Bicske
Attendance: 1,200
Referee: Gábor Oláh
15 June 2019
17:00

Tatabánya	0–1	Bicske
	Report	M. Farkas 18'

Gyula Grosics Stadium, Tatabánya
Attendance: 2,000
Referee: Ákos Gaál

Bicske won 1–0 on aggregate and are promoted to the Nemzeti Bajnokság III.

9 June 2019
17:30

Tiszafüred	0–2	Debreceni VSC II
	Report	Nagy 38'; Damásdi 39'

Lipcsey Elemér Sporttelep, Tiszafüred
Attendance: 700
Referee: Tamás Berényi
15 June 2019
17:00

Debreceni VSC II	6–0	Tiszafüred
Zsóri 10', 50'; Nagy 15'; Damásdi 23'; Pintér 83', 88'	Report

Debreceni Labdarúgó Akadémia, Debrecen
Referee: László Lovas

Debreceni VSC II won 8–0 on aggregate and are promoted to the Nemzeti Bajnokság III.

9 June 2019
17:30

Hévíz	1–1	Balatonlelle
Vass 56'	Report	Bohata 62'

Hévízi Sportpálya, Hévíz
Attendance: 1,000
Referee: Gergely Szőts
15 June 2019
17:00

Balatonlelle	0–0	Hévíz
	Report

Balatonlellei SE Sporttelep, Balatonlelle
Attendance: 1,200
Referee: J. Zoltán Kovács

1–1 on aggregate. Balatonlelle won on away goals and are promoted to the Nemzeti Bajnokság III. Hévíz were later admitted to NB III after vacancies arose.

9 June 2019
17:30

Békéscsaba II	1–1	Kelen
Tóth 56' (pen.)	Report	Tímári 21' (pen.)

Kórház utcai Stadion, Békéscsaba
Attendance: 400
Referee: Tibor Horváth
15 June 2019
17:00

Kelen	2–1	Békéscsaba II
Koós 80'; Tímári 90+4'	Report	Tóth 33'

Kelen SC Sporttelep, Budapest
Attendance: 1,000
Referee: József Ducsai

Kelen won 3–2 on aggregate and are promoted to the Nemzeti Bajnokság III.

== See also ==
- 2018–19 Magyar Kupa
- 2018–19 Nemzeti Bajnokság III
- 2018–19 Nemzeti Bajnokság II
- 2018–19 Nemzeti Bajnokság I
