= Dániel Zsóri =

Hungarian footballer (born 2000)

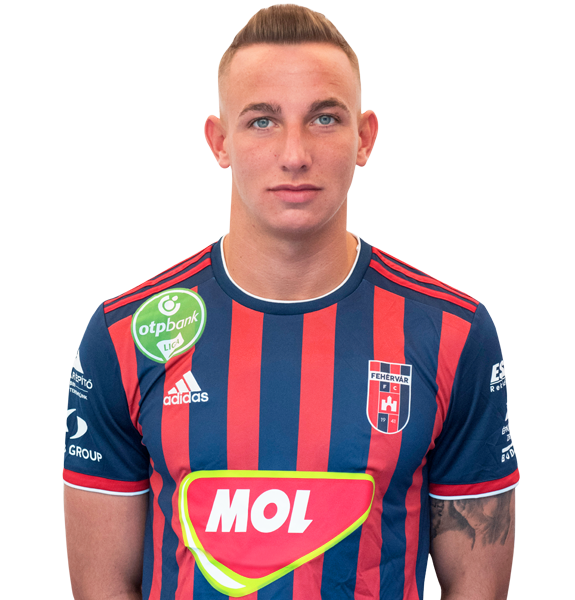
- Zsóri in 2019

Personal information
- Date of birth: 14 October 2000 (age 26)
- Place of birth: Oradea, Romania
- Height: 1.77 m (5 ft 10 in)
- Position: Forward

Team information
- Current team: Kozármisleny (on loan from MTK Budapest)
- Number: 90

Youth career
- 2011–2015: Békéscsaba UFC
- 2015–2017: Békéscsaba
- 2016–2018: Debrecen

Senior career*
Years	Team	Apps	(Gls)
2017–2018	Debrecen II	14	(9)
2019	Debrecen	15	(1)
2019–2022	MOL Fehérvár	5	(0)
2020	→ Budaörs (loan)	4	(1)
2020–2021	→ Budafok (loan)	21	(3)
2022	→ Zalaegerszeg (loan)	9	(3)
2022–2024	MTK Budapest	31	(6)
2024	→ Budafok (loan)	16	(4)
2024–2026	UTA Arad	25	(4)
2026–	MTK Budapest	0	(0)
2026–	→ Kozármisleny (loan)	13	(2)

International career
2020	Hungary U21	1	(0)
- * Club domestic league appearances and goals as of 31 May 2026

Dániel Zsóri (born 14 October 2000) is a professional footballer who plays as a forward for Nemzeti Bajnokság II club Kozármisleny, on loan from Nemzeti Bajnokság I club MTK Budapest. Born in Romania, he has represented Hungary at youth level.

== Early life ==
Zsóri was born in Oradea, Romania on 14 October 2000. He grew up in Satu Nou, Mișca Commune in Arad County. When he was 10 years old, he moved to Békéscsaba to play in the Békéscsaba 1912 Előre youth academy.

Zsóri holds dual Romanian and Hungarian citizenship. He has stated that he would prefer to play for the Hungary national team over the Romania national team if given the option.

== Club career ==
=== Debrecen ===
Debrecen signed Zsóri in September 2017. He was promoted into their senior squad in 2018–19 by manager András Herczeg, who selected him for his senior bow in the Magyar Kupa against Teskánd on 31 October 2018. Zsóri made his debut in the Nemzeti Bajnokság I during a home fixture with league leaders Ferencváros on 16 February, with the forward being substituted on in place of Márk Szécsi before going on to score a ninetieth minute overhead kick at the Nagyerdei Stadion for Debrecen to win 2–1; the goal was shortlisted for the FIFA Puskás Award, which he later won.

=== Fehérvár ===
On 1 September 2019, Zsóri completed a transfer to Magyar Kupa holders Fehérvár. After five appearances in five months for them, Zsóri was loaned out in January 2020 to Nemzeti Bajnokság II side Budaörs. He scored the winner on his debut against Vác on 2 February. He featured four times in total for Budaörs, in a season that was prematurely ended due to the COVID-19 pandemic. In the succeeding June, Zsóri again departed Fehérvár on loan after agreeing terms with newly promoted Nemzeti Bajnokság I team Budafok.

=== MTK Budapest ===
On 18 July 2022, Zsóri signed a three-year contract with MTK Budapest. On 10 April 2023, he lost his consciousness after a crash with Barnabás Ruisz in a 2022-23 Nemzeti Bajnokság II match against Győr. He was transported to the Petz Aladár Egyetemi Oktató hospital.

== Career statistics ==
As of 30 October 2025.

Appearances and goals by club, season and competition
Club	Season	League			National cup (Note: Includes Magyar Kupa, Cupa României)		Continental		Other		Total	
Club	Season	Division	Apps	Goals	Apps	Goals	Apps	Goals	Apps	Goals	Apps	Goals
Debrecen II	2017–18	Megyei Bajnokság I	14	9	—		—		—		14	9
Debrecen	2018–19	Nemzeti Bajnokság I	13	1	7	1	—		—		20	2
Debrecen	2019–20	Nemzeti Bajnokság I	2	0	—		3 (Note: Appearances in UEFA Europa League)	0	—		5	0
Debrecen	Total		15	1	7	1	3	0	—		25	2
MOL Fehérvár	2019–20	Nemzeti Bajnokság I	5	0	2	0	—		—		7	0
Budaörs (loan)	2019–20	Nemzeti Bajnokság II	4	1	—		—		—		4	1
Budafok (loan)	2020–21	Nemzeti Bajnokság I	21	3	5	5	—		—		26	8
Zalaegerszeg (loan)	2021–22	Nemzeti Bajnokság I	9	3	—		—		—		9	3
MTK Budapest	2022–23	Nemzeti Bajnokság II	21	6	3	1	—		—		24	7
MTK Budapest	2023–24	Nemzeti Bajnokság I	10	0	2	1	—		—		12	1
MTK Budapest	Total		31	6	5	1	—		—		36	7
Budafok (loan)	2023–24	Nemzeti Bajnokság II	16	4	—		—		—		16	4
UTA Arad	2024–25	Liga I	19	3	1	0	—		—		20	3
UTA Arad	2025–26	Liga I	6	1	1	0	—		—		7	1
UTA Arad	Total		25	4	2	0	—		—		27	4
Kozármisleny (loan)	2025–26	Nemzeti Bajnokság II	0	0	—		—		—		0	0
Career total			140	31	21	8	3	0	0	0	164	39

== Honours ==
Individual

- FIFA Puskás Award: 2019
