= Teskánd =

Coordinates: 46°51′20″N 16°46′50″E

- Village
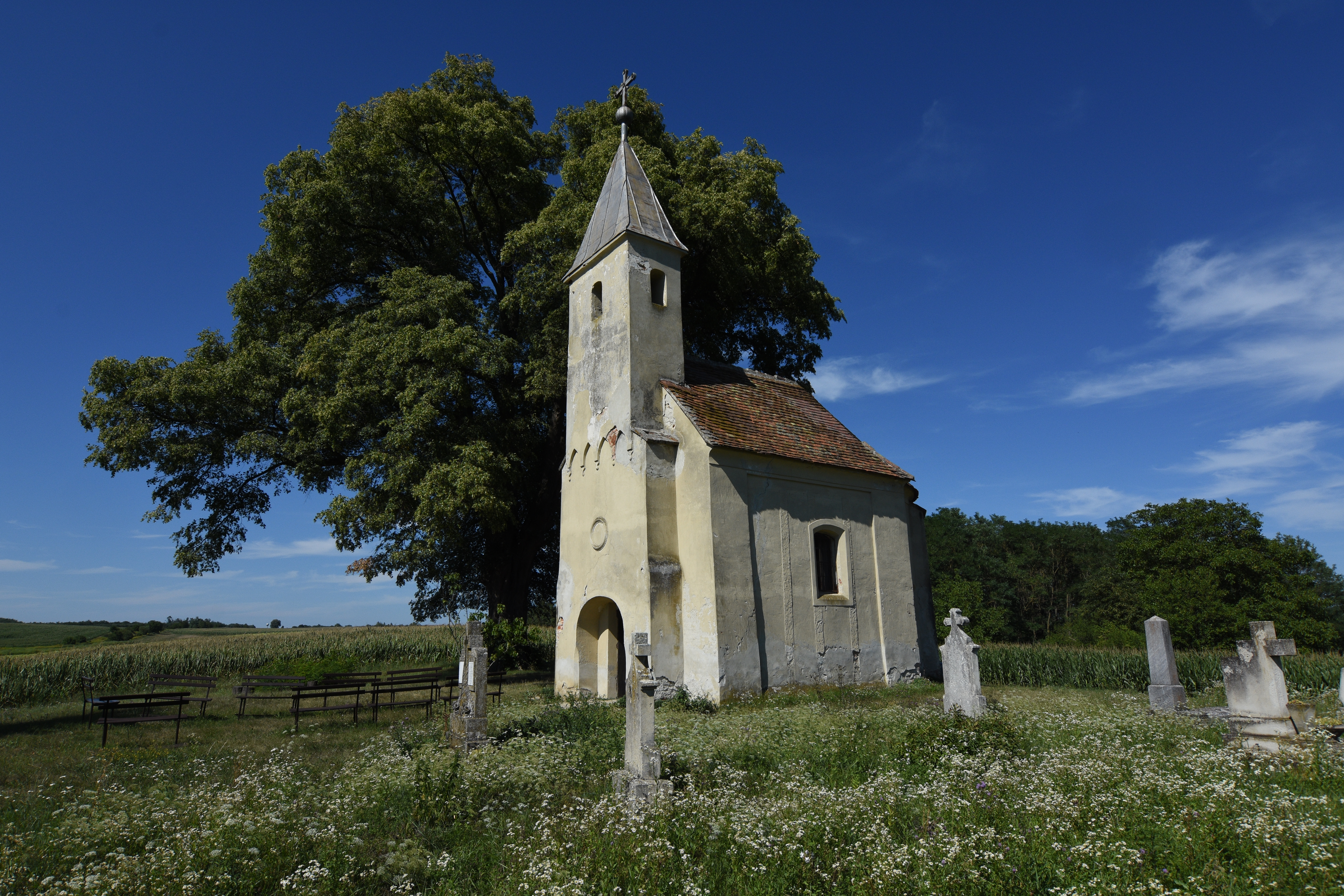
- Szent Ilona kápolna Teskánd Zalaegerszeg
- Interactive map of Teskánd
- Country: Hungary
- Region: Western Transdanubia
- County: Zala County

Population (2010)
  - Total: 1,125
- Time zone: UTC+1 (CET)
  - Summer (DST): UTC+2 (CEST)

Teskánd is a village in Zala County, Hungary.
