= Ádám Pintér (footballer, born 2001) =

Hungarian footballer

Personal information
- Date of birth: 25 December 2001 (age 24)
- Place of birth: Szolnok, Hungary
- Height: 1.79 m (5 ft 10 in)
- Position: Left winger

Team information
- Current team: Kazincbarcikai
- Number: 23

Youth career
- 2008–2017: Szolnok

Senior career*
Years	Team	Apps	(Gls)
2018–2022	Debrecen	30	(4)
2018–2022	→ Debrecen II	38	(15)
2019	→ Balmazújváros (loan)	3	(0)
2020	→ Kaposvár (loan)	10	(0)
2022–2023	Szeged-Csanád	11	(0)
2023	Szentlőrinc	14	(1)
2023–2024	Budafok	15	(1)
2024–	Kazincbarcikai	24	(0)
- * Club domestic league appearances and goals as of 1 June 2025

Ádám Pintér (born 25 December 2001) is a Hungarian football defender who plays for Kazincbarcikai.

== Career ==
On 19 January 2023, Pintér signed a year-and-a-half contract with Szentlőrinc.

== Career statistics ==
As of 15 May 2022.

Appearances and goals by club, season and competition
Club	Season	League			Cup		Continental		Other		Total	
Club	Season	Division	Apps	Goals	Apps	Goals	Apps	Goals	Apps	Goals	Apps	Goals
Debrecen II	2018–19	Megyei Bajnokág I	14	11	—		—		—		14	11
Debrecen II	2019–20	Nemzeti Bajnokság III	7	1	—		—		—		7	1
Debrecen II	2020–21	Nemzeti Bajnokság III	4	3	—		—		—		4	3
Debrecen II	2021–22	Nemzeti Bajnokság III	13	0	—		—		—		13	0
Debrecen II	Total		38	15	0	0	0	0	0	0	38	15
Debrecen	2018–19	Nemzeti Bajnokság I	0	0	2	1	—		0	0	2	1
Debrecen	2019–20	Nemzeti Bajnokság I	4	0	3	0	1	0	—		8	0
Debrecen	2020–21	Nemzeti Bajnokság II	22	4	4	0	—		—		26	4
Debrecen	2021–22	Nemzeti Bajnokság I	4	0	1	0	—		—		5	0
Debrecen	Total		30	4	10	1	1	0	0	0	41	5
Balmazújváros	2019–20	Nemzeti Bajnokság II	3	0	0	0	—		—		3	0
Balmazújváros	Total		3	0	0	0	0	0	0	0	3	0
Kaposvár	2019–20	Nemzeti Bajnokság I	10	0	0	0	—		—		10	0
Kaposvár	Total		10	0	0	0	0	0	0	0	10	0
Career total			81	19	10	1	1	0	0	0	92	20
