= Szabolcs Barna =

Hungarian footballer

Personal information
- Date of birth: 27 April 1996 (age 30)
- Place of birth: Debrecen, Hungary
- Height: 1.86 m (6 ft 1 in)
- Position: Left back

Youth career
- 2004–2008: Debrecen
- 2008–2009: Létavértes SC ’97
- 2009–2013: Debrecen
- 2009–2010: → Báránd KSE (loan)

Senior career*
Years	Team	Apps	(Gls)
2013–2020	Debrecen II	57	(1)
2016–2020	Debrecen	27	(1)
2016–2017	→ Nyíregyháza (loan)	5	(0)
2020–2021	MTK Budapest	6	(0)
2021–2022	Győr	3	(0)
- * Club domestic league appearances and goals as of 22 May 2022

Szabolcs Barna (born 27 April 1996) is a Hungarian footballer.

== Career statistics ==
Appearances and goals by club, season and competition
Club	Season	League			Cup		Europe		Total	
Club	Season	Division	Apps	Goals	Apps	Goals	Apps	Goals	Apps	Goals
Debrecen II
Debrecen II	2013–14	Nemzeti Bajnokság III	11	0	0	0	—		11	0
Debrecen II	2014–15	Nemzeti Bajnokság III	12	1	0	0	—		12	1
Debrecen II	2015–16	Nemzeti Bajnokság III	18	0	0	0	—		18	0
Debrecen II	2016–17	Nemzeti Bajnokság III	15	0	0	0	—		15	0
Debrecen II	Total		56	1	0	0	—		56	1
Nyíregyháza	2016–17	Nemzeti Bajnokság II	5	0	2	0	—		7	0
Debrecen
Debrecen	2016–17	Nemzeti Bajnokság I	1	0	0	0	—		1	0
Debrecen	2017–18	Nemzeti Bajnokság I	10	0	7	0	—		17	0
Debrecen	2018–19	Nemzeti Bajnokság I	12	1	6	0	—		18	1
Debrecen	2019–20	Nemzeti Bajnokság I	4	0	3	0	0	0	7	0
Debrecen	Total		27	1	16	0	—		43	1
MTK Budapest	2020–21	Nemzeti Bajnokság I	6	0	2	0	—		8	0
Career total			94	2	20	0	0	0	114	2

Updated to games played as of 15 May 2021.
