= Dániel Bereczki =

Hungarian footballer

Personal information
- Date of birth: 2 June 1995 (age 31)
- Place of birth: Debrecen, Hungary
- Height: 1.78 m (5 ft 10 in)
- Position: Midfielder

Team information
- Current team: DEAC

Youth career
- 2004–2013: Debrecen

Senior career*
Years	Team	Apps	(Gls)
2012–2015	Debrecen II	81	(29)
2014–2020	Debrecen	22	(0)
2013–2014	→ Létavértes SC ’97 (loan)	27	(7)
2020–2021	Kazincbarcika	18	(0)
2021–	DEAC	12	(0)

International career^{‡}
2014	Hungary U20	3	(1)
- * Club domestic league appearances and goals as of 16 May 2021 ‡ National team caps and goals as of 3 August 2014

Dániel Bereczki (born 2 June 1996) is a Hungarian football player who plays for the Hungarian team DEAC as a midfielder.

== Career statistics ==
Appearances and goals by club, season and competition
Club	Season	League		Cup		League Cup		Europe		Total	
Club	Season	Apps	Goals	Apps	Goals	Apps	Goals	Apps	Goals	Apps	Goals
Debrecen II
Debrecen II	2013–14	1	0	0	0	0	0	0	0	1	0
Debrecen II	2013–14	20	3	0	0	0	0	0	0	20	3
Debrecen II	2014–15	18	4	0	0	0	0	0	0	18	4
Debrecen II	2015–16	21	8	0	0	0	0	0	0	21	8
Debrecen II	2016–17	11	3	0	0	0	0	0	0	11	3
Debrecen II	2017–18	6	3	0	0	0	0	0	0	6	3
Debrecen II	2018–19	1	7	0	0	0	0	0	0	1	7
Debrecen II	2019–20	2	1	0	0	0	0	0	0	2	1
Debrecen II	Total	80	29	0	0	0	0	0	0	80	29
Létavértes
Létavértes	2013–14	27	7	0	0	0	0	0	0	27	7
Létavértes	Total	27	7	0	0	0	0	0	0	27	7
Debrecen
Debrecen	2014–15	1	0	2	2	7	2	0	0	10	4
Debrecen	2015–16	5	0	3	0	0	0	0	0	8	0
Debrecen	2016–17	4	0	0	0	0	0	0	0	4	0
Debrecen	2017–18	4	0	2	0	0	0	0	0	6	0
Debrecen	2018–19	6	0	1	0	0	0	0	0	7	0
Debrecen	2019–20	2	0	1	0	0	0	0	0	3	0
Debrecen	Total	22	0	9	2	7	2	0	0	38	4
Career total		129	36	9	2	7	2	0	0	145	40

Updated to games played as of 24 June 2020.
