= Alex Hrabina =

Hungarian association football player

Personal information
- Date of birth: 5 April 1995 (age 31)
- Place of birth: Nyíregyháza, Hungary
- Height: 1.90 m (6 ft 3 in)
- Position: Goalkeeper

Team information
- Current team: Kisvárda
- Number: 21

Youth career
- 2006–2011: Nyíregyháza

Senior career*
Years	Team	Apps	(Gls)
2011–2015	Nyíregyháza	6	(0)
2013–2014	→ Budaörs (loan)	19	(0)
2015–2016	Szolnok	5	(0)
2016–2017	Gyirmót II	12	(0)
2017	Békéscsaba	3	(0)
2017–2018	Szolnok	27	(0)
2018–2019	Cigánd	10	(0)
2019–2023	Debrecen	12	(0)
2019–2023	→ Debrecen II	47	(0)
2023	Nyíregyháza	5	(0)
2024	Tiszaújváros	12	(0)
2024–	Kisvárda	5	(0)

International career^{‡}
2011–2012	Hungary U-17	14	(0)
2013–2014	Hungary U-19	2	(0)
- * Club domestic league appearances and goals as of 1 June 2025 ‡ National team caps and goals as of 25 July 2014

Alex Hrabina (born 5 April 1995) is a Hungarian football goalkeeper who plays for Kisvárda.

== Club career ==
On 2 January 2023, Hrabina returned to Nyíregyháza.

== Career statistics ==
As of 15 May 2022

Appearances and goals by club, season and competition
Club	Season	League			Cup		Continental		Other		Total	
Club	Season	Division	Apps	Goals	Apps	Goals	Apps	Goals	Apps	Goals	Apps	Goals
Nyíregyháza	2011–12	Nemzeti Bajnokság II	1	0	0	0	—		—		1	0
Nyíregyháza	2012–13	Nemzeti Bajnokság II	4	0	0	0	—		—		4	0
Nyíregyháza	2014–15	Nemzeti Bajnokság I	1	0	1	0	—		6	0	8	0
Nyíregyháza	Total		6	0	1	0	0	0	6	0	13	0
Budaörs	2013–14	Nemzeti Bajnokság II	19	0	0	0	—		—		19	0
Budaörs	Total		19	0	0	0	0	0	0	0	19	0
Szolnok	2015–16	Nemzeti Bajnokság II	5	0	1	0	—		—		6	0
Szolnok	2017–18	Nemzeti Bajnokság II	27	0	0	0	—		—		27	0
Szolnok	Total		32	0	1	0	0	0	0	0	33	0
Békéscsaba	2016–17	Nemzeti Bajnokság II	3	0	0	0	—		—		3	0
Békéscsaba	Total		3	0	0	0	0	0	0	0	3	0
Gyirmót II	2016–17	Nemzeti Bajnokság III	12	0	0	0	—		—		12	0
Gyirmót II	Total		12	0	0	0	0	0	0	0	12	0
Cigánd	2017–18	Nemzeti Bajnokság III	10	0	1	0	—		—		11	0
Cigánd	Total		10	0	1	0	0	0	0	0	11	0
Debrecen II	2018–19	Megyei Bajnokság I	6	0	—		—		—		6	0
Debrecen II	2019–20	Nemzeti Bajnokság III	12	0	—		—		—		12	0
Debrecen II	2020–21	Nemzeti Bajnokság III	20	0	—		—		—		20	0
Debrecen II	2021–22	Nemzeti Bajnokság III	9	0	—		—		—		9	0
Debrecen II	Total		47	0	0	0	0	0	0	0	47	0
Debrecen	2021–22	Nemzeti Bajnokság I	8	0	0	0	—		—		8	0
Debrecen	Total		8	0	0	0	0	0	0	0	8	0
Career total			137	0	3	0	0	0	6	0	146	0
