= Alex Damásdi =

Hungarian footballer

Personal information
- Date of birth: 27 March 1997 (age 29)
- Place of birth: Budapest, Hungary
- Height: 1.79 m (5 ft 10 in)
- Position: Right winger

Team information
- Current team: SV Rohrbach
- Number: 11

Youth career
- 2006–2008: Vasas
- 2008–2011: MTK Budapest
- 2011–2013: Videoton
- 2013–2017: Puskás Akadémia II

Senior career*
Years	Team	Apps	(Gls)
2014–2017	Puskás Akadémia	0	(0)
2016–2017	→ Csákvár (loan)	4	(0)
2017–2018	Cegléd	38	(9)
2018–2021	Debrecen	8	(0)
2020	→ DEAC (loan)	13	(1)
2021	Cegléd	17	(4)
2021–2022	Siófok	3	(0)
2022	Gárdony	14	(7)
2022–	SV Rohrbach	29	(13)
- * Club domestic league appearances and goals as of 19:41, 20 June 2023 (UTC)

Alex Damásdi (born 27 March 1997) is a Hungarian football player who plays for SV Rohrbach.

== Career ==
=== Debrecen ===
On 2 February, Damásdi played his first match for Debrecen in a 0-0 drawn against Újpest in the Hungarian League.

== Career statistics ==
Appearances and goals by club, season and competition
Club	Season	League		Cup		Europe		Total	
Club	Season	Apps	Goals	Apps	Goals	Apps	Goals	Apps	Goals
Puskás Akadémia
Puskás Akadémia	2015–16	0	0	1	0	–	–	1	0
Puskás Akadémia	Total	0	0	1	0	–	–	1	0
Csákvár
Csákvár	2016–17	4	0	1	0	–	–	5	0
Csákvár	Total	4	0	1	0	–	–	5	0
Cegléd
Cegléd	2017–18	38	9	0	0	–	–	38	9
Cegléd	Total	38	9	0	0	–	–	38	9
Debrecen
Debrecen	2018–19	8	0	7	0	–	–	15	0
Debrecen	2019–20	0	0	1	0	1	0	2	0
Debrecen	Total	8	0	8	0	1	0	17	0
Career total		50	9	10	0	1	0	61	9

Updated to games played as of 30 October 2019.
