= Albion Avdijaj =

Albanian footballer (born 1994)

Personal information
- Full name: Albion Qaush Avdijaj
- Date of birth: 12 January 1994 (age 32)
- Place of birth: Zürich, Switzerland
- Height: 1.91 m (6 ft 3 in)
- Position: Forward

Youth career
- –2003: Red Star Zürich
- 2003–2014: Grasshoppers
- 2005–2007: → FC Zürich (loan)
- 2010–2011: → 1899 Hoffenheim (loan)
- 2012–2013: → VfL Wolfsburg (loan)

Senior career*
Years	Team	Apps	(Gls)
2011–2014	Grasshoppers U21	34	(13)
2013–2014	Grasshoppers	0	(0)
2014–2015	VfL Wolfsburg II	31	(14)
2015–2017	Vaduz	46	(7)
2017–2019	Grasshoppers	14	(2)
2017–2019	→ Grasshoppers U21	3	(1)
2018–2019	→ Debrecen (loan)	21	(1)
2019–2020	Viborg	6	(0)
2020	Tirana	0	(0)
2021	Vllaznia Shkodër	12	(1)
2021–2022	Kriens	30	(4)

International career
2011	Switzerland U17	4	(0)
2011–2012	Switzerland U18	7	(2)
2012–2013	Switzerland U19	3	(1)
2014	Kosovo	2	(0)
2015	Albania U21	2	(1)
- * Club domestic league appearances and goals as of 21 May 2022

Albion Qaush Avdijaj (born 12 January 1994) is a professional footballer who plays as a forward. Born in Switzerland, he represented that nation at youth international levels, appeared in two friendly matches for the Kosovo senior team, and played twice for Albania at under-21 level.

== Club career ==
=== VfL Wolfsburg II ===
Avdijaj was born in Zürich. After failing to break to Grasshopper's first team, he joined the reserve team of VfL Wolfsburg for the 2015–16 season. He made his debut in the Regionalliga on 17 August, playing full-90 minutes in a 1–0 away win to Neumünster. Then Avdijaj scored his first goals with Wolves on 6 September in a 4–0 home hammering of Havelse. Avdijaj continued with his strong form, scoring against Eintracht Norderstedt, the winner against VfB Oldenburg, before scoring another brace in the 4–2 home win over Braunschweig, taking his tally up to 6 goals.

=== Vaduz ===
On 30 August 2015, on the deadline day, Avdijaj completed a transfer to Vaduz for an undisclosed fee, signing until June 2017. Upon signing, Avdijaj stated: "The transfer is successfully completed, I'm ready for the new challenge. He was allocated squad number 7, and made his competitive debut on 12 September in the opening Swiss Super League week against Young Boys, entering as a second-half substitute in an eventual 4–0 away crash. He opened his scoring account later on 31 October where he scored the opener against Basel, which turned out to be nothing as visitors bounced back to win 2–1. One week later, Avdijaj was again on the scoresheet, netting in the 72nd minute against FC Zürich but was sent-off two minutes later following a second yellow card; the match finished in a 1–1 draw.

=== Viborg FF ===
On 3 September 2019, Avdijaj joined Viborg FF in Denmark on a three-year deal. On 19 May 2020 the club confirmed, that Avdijaj's contract had been terminated, because he wanted to be closer to his family in Switzerland.

=== Kriens ===
On 1 July 2021, he signed with Kriens.

== International career ==
=== Kosovo ===
In May 2014, Avdijaj accepted an invitation from Albert Bunjaku to play for Kosovo in the friendlies against Turkey and Senegal. He made his first appearance for Kosovo against Turkey on 21 May, appearing as a substitute in the 60th minute in an eventual 1–6 home defeat. Four days later he made his second appearance, his first as a starter, in another defeat, this time to Senegal at Stade de Genève. Those were his only appearances for Kosovo, as he switched to play for Albania.

== Career statistics ==
=== Club ===
As of 13 April 2019

Appearances and goals by club, season and competition
Club	Season	League			Cup		Europe (Note: Appearances in UEFA Champions League and UEFA Europa League)		Other		Total	
Club	Season	Division	Apps	Goals	Apps	Goals	Apps	Goals	Apps	Goals	Apps	Goals
Grasshoppers II	2011–12	1. Liga Promotion	22	6	—		—		—		22	6
Grasshoppers II	2013–14	1. Liga Classic	12	7	—		—		—		12	7
Grasshoppers II	Total		34	13	—		—		—		34	13
Grasshoppers	2013–14	Swiss Super League	0	0	—		—		—		0	0
VfL Wolfsburg II	2014–15	Regionalliga	26	11	—		—		—		26	11
VfL Wolfsburg II	2015–16	Regionalliga	5	3	—		—		—		5	3
VfL Wolfsburg II	Total		31	14	—		—		—		31	14
Vaduz	2015–16	Swiss Super League]	23	4	2	1	—		—		25	5
Vaduz	2016–17	Swiss Super League]	23	3	2	6	3	0	—		28	9
Vaduz	Total		46	7	4	7	3	0	—		53	14
Grasshoppers	2017–18	Swiss Super League	10	2	3	1	—		—		13	3
Grasshoppers II	2017–18	Swiss 1. Liga	1	0	—		—		—		1	0
Debrecen	2018–19	Nemzeti Bajnokság I	21	1	3	2	—		—		24	3
Career total			143	37	10	10	3	0	—		156	47

=== International ===
As of 25 May 2014

Appearances and goals by national team and year
National team	Year	Apps	Goals
Kosovo	2014	2	0
Total		2	0

== Honours ==
Grasshoppers

- Swiss Cup: 2012–13

FC Vaduz

- Liechtenstein Football Cup: 2015-16, 2016-17
