= Kevin Nagy =

Hungarian footballer

Personal information
- Full name: Kevin Zsolt Nagy
- Date of birth: 11 September 1995 (age 31)
- Place of birth: Debrecen, Hungary
- Height: 1.83 m (6 ft 0 in)
- Position: Winger

Team information
- Current team: Csorna

Youth career
- 2005–2006: Nyírábrány
- 2006–2010: Debrecen
- 2010–2013: Hajdúböszörmény

Senior career*
Years	Team	Apps	(Gls)
2012–2013	Hajdúböszörmény	6	(0)
2013–2014	Ebes	11	(1)
2014–2019	Debrecen	6	(0)
2014–2019	Debrecen II	87	(46)
2015–2016	→ Balmazújváros (loan)	16	(1)
2019–2020	Szolnok	6	(0)
2020–2023	MTE	89	(12)
2023–	Csorna	2	(0)
- * Club domestic league appearances and goals as of 2 August 2023

Kevin Nagy (born 11 September 1995) is a Hungarian football player who plays for Csorna.

== Career ==
=== Debrecen ===
On 27 May 2017, Nagy played his first match for Debrecen in a 3–1 win against Diósgyőr in the Hungarian League.

== Career statistics ==
As of 19 February 2019

Appearances and goals by club, season and competition
Club	Season	League		Cup		Europe		Total	
Club	Season	Apps	Goals	Apps	Goals	Apps	Goals	Apps	Goals
Hajdúböszörmény
Hajdúböszörmény	2012–13	6	0	0	0	–	–	6	0
Hajdúböszörmény	Total	6	0	0	0	0	0	6	0
Ebes
Ebes	2013–14	11	1	0	0	–	–	11	1
Ebes	Total	11	1	0	0	0	0	11	1
Debrecen II
Debrecen II	2014–15	14	2	0	0	–	–	14	2
Debrecen II	2016–17	33	6	0	0	–	–	33	6
Debrecen II	2017–18	9	7	0	0	–	–	9	7
Debrecen II	Total	56	15	0	0	0	0	56	15
Debrecen
Debrecen	2016–17	1	0	0	0	0	0	1	0
Debrecen	2017–18	4	0	5	1	–	–	9	1
Debrecen	2018–19	1	0	3	0	–	–	4	0
Debrecen	Total	6	0	8	1	0	0	14	1
Career total		79	16	8	1	0	0	87	17
