= 2018–19 Nemzeti Bajnokság I =

Nemzeti Bajnokság I
- Season: 2018–19
- Dates: 21 July 2018 – 19 May 2019
- Champions: Ferencváros
- Relegated: MTK; Haladás
- Champions League: Ferencváros
- Europa League: Vidi; Debrecen; Honvéd
- Top goalscorer: Davide Lanzafame; Filip Holender (16 goals each)
- Biggest home win: Ferencváros 7-0 Diósgyőr
- Biggest away win: Paks 0-4 Vidi; Puskás Akadémia 0-4 Kisvárda
- Highest scoring: Honvéd 4-4 Diósgyőr
- Highest attendance: 20 675; Ferencváros 1-0 Újpest
- Lowest attendance: 61; Puskás Akadémia 1-1 Kisvárda

The 2018–19 Nemzeti Bajnokság I (also known as 2018–19 OTP Bank Liga), also known as NB I, was the 120th season of top-tier football in Hungary. The league was officially named OTP Bank Liga for sponsorship reasons. Videoton were the defending champions.

Fixtures were published on 27 June 2018.

== Teams ==
Balmazújváros and Vasas finished the 2017–18 Nemzeti Bajnokság I in the last two places and thus were relegated to NB II division.

The two relegated teams were replaced with the top two teams in 2017–18 Nemzeti Bajnokság II, champion MTK and runner-up Kisvárda, each having the required licence for top-division play.

=== Stadium and locations ===
Following is the list of clubs competed in the league this season, with their location, stadium and stadium capacity.

Team	Location	Stadium	Capacity	Ref
Debrecen	Debrecen	Nagyerdei Stadion	20,340	
Diósgyőr	Miskolc	Diósgyőri Stadion	15,325	
Ferencváros	Budapest (Ferencváros)	Groupama Aréna	22,000	
Honvéd	Budapest (Kispest)	Bozsik József Stadion	10,000	
Kisvárda	Kisvárda	Várkerti Stadion	2,850	
Mezőkövesd	Mezőkövesd	Városi Stadion	4,183	
Vidi	Székesfehérvár	MOL Aréna Sóstó	14,201	
Vidi	Felcsút	Pancho Aréna (Note: Vidi played five games at Pancho Aréna before opening their new Sóstói Stadion.)	3,816	
MTK	Budapest (Józsefváros)	Hidegkuti Nándor Stadion	5,322	
Paks	Paks	Fehérvári úti Stadion	6,150	
Puskás Akadémia	Felcsút	Pancho Aréna	3,816	
Haladás	Szombathely	Haladás Sportkomplexum	9,859	
Újpest	Budapest (Újpest)	Szusza Ferenc Stadion	13,501	

Debrecen	Diósgyőr	Ferencváros	Honvéd
Nagyerdei Stadion; UEFA Elite Stadium	Diósgyőri Stadion; UEFA Elite Stadium	Groupama Aréna; UEFA Elite Stadium	Bozsik József Stadion
Capacity: 20,340	Capacity: 15,325	Capacity: 22,000	Capacity: 10,000
Kisvárda	Location of teams in 2018–19 Nemzeti Bajnokság I Location of Budapest teams		Mezőkövesd
Várkerti Stadion	Location of teams in 2018–19 Nemzeti Bajnokság I Location of Budapest teams		Városi-Stadion
Capacity: 2,850	Location of teams in 2018–19 Nemzeti Bajnokság I Location of Budapest teams		Capacity: 4,183
Vidi	Location of teams in 2018–19 Nemzeti Bajnokság I Location of Budapest teams		MTK
MOL Aréna Sóstó; UEFA Elite Stadium	Location of teams in 2018–19 Nemzeti Bajnokság I Location of Budapest teams		Hidegkuti Nándor Stadion; UEFA Elite Stadium
Capacity: 14,201	Location of teams in 2018–19 Nemzeti Bajnokság I Location of Budapest teams		Capacity: 5,322
Paks	Puskás Akadémia	Haladás	Újpest
Fehérvári úti Stadion	Pancho Aréna; UEFA Elite Stadium	Haladás Sportkomplexum; UEFA Elite Stadium	Szusza Ferenc Stadion
Capacity: 6,150	Capacity: 3,816	Capacity: 9,859	Capacity: 13,501

=== Personnel and kits ===
All teams are obligated to have the logo of the league sponsor OTP Bank as well as the Nemzeti Bajnokság I logo on the right sleeve of their shirt.

Note: Flags indicate national team as has been defined under FIFA eligibility rules. Players and Managers may hold more than one non-FIFA nationality.

Team	Chairman	Head coach	Captain	Kit manufacturer	Sponsors
Honvéd	(United States) George F. Hemingway	(Hungary) Attila Supka	(Bosnia and Herzegovina) Đorđe Kamber	(Italy) Macron	
Debrecen	(Hungary) Gábor Szima	(Hungary) András Herczeg	(Hungary) Dániel Tőzsér	(Germany) Adidas	Grand Casino
Diósgyőr	(Hungary) Gergely Sántha	(Spain) Fernando	(Hungary) Zoltán Lipták	(Hungary) 2Rule	Borsodi
Ferencváros	(Hungary) Gábor Kubatov	(Ukraine) Serhii Rebrov	(Hungary) Dániel Böde	(United States) Nike	Magyar Telekom
Kisvárda	(Hungary) Attila Révész	(Hungary) László Dajka	(Brazil) Lucas	(Germany) Adidas	MasterGood
Mezőkövesd	(Hungary) András Tállai	(Hungary) Attila Kuttor	(Hungary) Pál Lázár	(Germany) Adidas	Cronus, Zsóry Bath
Vidi	(Hungary) István Garancsi	(Serbia) Marko Nikolić	(Hungary) Roland Juhász	(Germany) Adidas	MOL
MTK	(Hungary) Tamás Deutsch	(Hungary) Tamás Feczkó	(Hungary) József Kanta	(United States) Nike	Prohuman
Paks	(Hungary) János Süli	(Hungary) Aurél Csertői	(Hungary) Zsolt Gévay	(Germany) Jako	
Puskás Akadémia	(Hungary) Lőrinc Mészáros	(Hungary) János Radoki	(Hungary) Lajos Hegedűs	(Hungary) 2Rule	Mészáros és Mészáros
Haladás	(Hungary) Béla Illés	(Hungary) Ferenc Horváth	(Hungary) Gábor Király	(Hungary) 2Rule	
Újpest	(Belgium) Roland Duchâtelet	(Serbia) Nebojša Vignjević	(Hungary) Róbert Litauszki	(Spain) Joma	Volkswagen Centrum

=== Managerial changes ===
Team	Outgoing manager	Manner of departure	Date of vacancy	Position in table	Incoming manager	Date of appointment
Kisvárda	(Hungary) Elemér Kondás		30 July 2018		(Hungary) László Dajka	14 August 2018
Ferencváros	(Germany) Thomas Doll		22 August 2018		(Ukraine) Serhii Rebrov	22 August 2018
Haladás	(Slovakia) Michal Hipp		19 September 2018		(Hungary) Ferenc Horváth	27 September 2018
Puskás Akadémia	(Hungary) Miklós Benczés		8 December 2018		(Hungary) János Radoki	29 December 2018

== League table ==
Pos	Team	Pld	W	D	L	GF	GA	GD	Pts	Qualification or relegation
1	Ferencváros (C)	33	23	5	5	72	27	+45	74	Qualification for the Champions League first qualifying round
2	Vidi	33	18	7	8	53	37	+16	61	Qualification for the Europa League first qualifying round (Note: Since the winners of the 2018–19 Magyar Kupa, Vidi, qualified for European competition based on league position, the spot awarded to the cup winners (Europa League first qualifying round) was passed to the fourth-placed team.)
3	Debrecen	33	14	9	10	44	39	+5	51	Qualification for the Europa League first qualifying round
4	Honvéd	33	13	10	10	46	38	+8	49	Qualification for the Europa League first qualifying round
5	Újpest	33	12	12	9	38	28	+10	48	
6	Mezőkövesd	33	12	8	13	45	40	+5	44	
7	Puskás Akadémia	33	11	7	15	36	45	−9	40	
8	Paks	33	9	12	12	33	46	−13	39	
9	Kisvárda	33	10	8	15	36	48	−12	38	
10	Diósgyőr	33	10	8	15	36	57	−21	38	
11	MTK (R)	33	10	4	19	42	56	−14	34	Relegation to the Nemzeti Bajnokság II
12	Haladás (R)	33	8	6	19	31	51	−20	30	Relegation to the Nemzeti Bajnokság II

Source: Hungarian Football Federation (in Hungarian), Soccerway
Rules for classification: 1) Points; 2) Matches won; 3) Goal difference; 4) Goals scored; 5) Head-to-head points; 6) Head-to-head goal difference; 7) Head-to-head away goals scored; 8) Fair play ranking; 9) Drawing of lots.
(C) Champions; (R) Relegated

=== Positions by round ===
Team ╲ Round	1	2	3	4	5	6	7	8	9	10	11	12	13	14	15	16	17	18	19	20	21	22	23	24	25	26	27	28	29	30	31	32	33
Ferencváros	2	1	1	1	1	1	1	1	1	1	1	1	1	1	1	1	1	1	1	1	1	1	1	1	1	1	1	1	1	1	1	1	1
Vidi	1	3	5	5	5	5	5	4	3	5	3	5	3	3	2	2	2	2	2	2	2	2	2	2	2	2	2	2	2	2	2	2	2
Debrecen	6	5	3	4	4	4	4	8	6	7	6	4	5	7	7	7	6	3	3	4	3	5	5	3	3	4	4	4	3	3	3	3	3
Újpest	10	10	7	6	6	6	7	7	8	8	8	8	7	6	6	6	5	5	5	6	4	3	3	4	4	3	3	3	4	4	4	4	4
Honvéd	5	2	2	2	2	2	2	2	2	2	2	2	2	2	3	3	3	4	4	3	5	4	4	5	5	5	5	5	5	5	5	5	5
Mezőkövesd	3	4	6	7	7	8	6	5	7	6	4	7	6	5	5	5	7	7	7	8	7	8	6	6	6	6	6	6	6	6	6	6	6
Puskás Akadémia	8	8	8	10	11	11	12	11	9	9	9	9	9	9	9	9	9	9	9	9	9	9	9	9	9	9	9	9	8	7	7	7	7
Paks	9	9	10	9	10	7	8	6	5	4	7	6	8	8	8	8	8	8	8	7	8	7	8	8	8	8	8	8	10	8	8	8	8
Kisvárda	12	12	12	12	12	12	11	9	10	10	10	10	10	11	11	11	11	11	10	10	11	11	10	11	11	11	10	10	9	10	9	9	9
Diósgyőr	11	11	11	11	9	9	9	10	11	11	11	11	11	10	10	10	10	10	11	11	10	10	11	10	10	10	11	11	11	11	11	10	10
MTK	4	6	4	3	3	3	3	3	4	3	5	3	4	4	4	4	4	6	6	5	6	6	7	7	7	7	7	7	7	9	10	11	11
Haladás	7	7	9	8	8	10	10	12	12	12	12	12	12	12	12	12	12	12	12	12	12	12	12	12	12	12	12	12	12	12	12	12	12

Source: mlsz.hu (in Hungarian)
= Leader; = 2018–19 UEFA Europa League First qualifying round; = Relegation to 2019–20 Nemzeti Bajnokság II

== Results ==
=== Rounds 1–22 ===
Home \ Away	DEB	DIO	FER	HAL	HON	KIS	MEZ	MTK	PAK	PUS	UJP	VID
Debrecen	—	2–0	2–1	1–1	2–0	3–1	1–1	3–3	2–1	2–1	0–0	0–1
Diósgyőr	1–0	—	1–4	1–0	2–1	1–1	1–1	3–2	0–0	2–2	1–2	0–1
Ferencváros	2–2	4–1	—	3–1	1–0	2–0	3–2	2–0	1–1	4–0	1–0	2–2
Haladás	0–2	1–1	1–0	—	0–1	0–1	1–2	1–2	1–2	2–1	2–2	0–2
Honvéd	3–0	1–0	0–1	3–2	—	4–0	1–1	2–1	1–0	2–1	2–2	0–3
Kisvárda	3–0	1–1	0–2	4–1	0–3	—	1–2	1–0	0–0	1–0	1–4	2–2
Mezőkövesd	2–2	4–2	0–1	2–0	0–1	2–2	—	2–3	3–1	2–0	0–0	1–0
MTK	0–1	1–0	1–4	4–0	1–1	0–1	2–2	—	1–2	3–2	1–0	1–3
Paks	2–1	1–2	0–3	1–1	0–0	4–1	2–1	3–0	—	3–2	1–1	0–4
Puskás Akadémia	0–1	2–1	1–0	2–0	1–0	1–1	2–0	1–2	1–1	—	0–1	2–1
Újpest	1–0	5–0	1–1	2–0	0–0	1–0	1–1	0–2	1–1	2–0	—	2–0
Vidi	1–1	1–2	2–1	1–0	2–0	4–0	3–1	0–3	1–1	0–3	1–0	—

Source: Hungarian Football Federation (in Hungarian)
Legend: Blue = home team win; Yellow = draw; Red = away team win.

=== Rounds 23–33 ===
Home \ Away	DEB	DIO	FER	HAL	HON	KIS	MEZ	MTK	PAK	PUS	UJP	VID
Debrecen	—	1–0	—	2–1	—	1–3	1–0	3–1	4–1	—	—	—
Diósgyőr	—	—	—	0–1	—	—	—	—	1–0	1–0	3–0	2–1
Ferencváros	2–1	7–0	—	2–0	—	—	—	—	3–0	—	2–1	4–1
Haladás	—	—	—	—	—	—	—	1–0	1–1	3–0	3–2	1–1
Honvéd	1–1	4–4	3–2	1–3	—	—	—	—	3–0	—	—	0–1
Kisvárda	—	1–1	0–1	1–2	1–1	—	2–1	—	—	—	—	—
Mezőkövesd	—	3–0	1–2	1–0	3–1	—	—	—	2–0	—	—	—
MTK	—	2–1	1–3	—	1–4	0–1	0–1	—	—	—	—	—
Paks	—	—	—	—	—	1–0	—	1–0	—	0–0	0–2	2–2
Puskás Akadémia	2–0	—	1–1	—	2–2	0–4	1–0	3–2	—	—	—	—
Újpest	1–1	—	—	—	0–0	1–0	2–1	0–0	—	0–1	—	—
Vidi	2–1	—	—	—	—	2–1	1–0	4–2	—	1–1	2–1	—

Source: Hungarian Football Federation (in Hungarian)
Legend: Blue = home team win; Yellow = draw; Red = away team win.

== Season statistics ==
=== Top goalscorers ===
Rank	Player	Club	Goals
1	(Italy) Davide Lanzafame	Ferencváros	16
1	(Hungary) Filip Holender	Honvéd	16
3	(Croatia) Josip Knežević	Puskás Akadémia	12
3	(Hungary) Roland Varga	Ferencváros	12
5	(Serbia) Stefan Dražić	Mezőkövesd	11
6	(Serbia) Marko Šćepović	Vidi	10
7	(Brazil) Danilo	Honvéd	9
7	(Hungary) János Hahn	Paks	9
7	(Hungary) Zoltán Horváth	Kisvárda	9
7	(Hungary) Gábor Molnár	Mezőkövesd	9
7	(Hungary) Soma Novothny	Újpest	9

=== Hat-tricks ===
Name	For	Against	Round	Result	Date
(Hungary) Dániel Böde	Ferencváros	Diósgyőr	12th	4–1	27 October 2018
(Hungary) Soma Novothny	Ujpest	Kisvárda	14th	4–1	10 November 2018

== Average attendances ==
Pos	Team	Total	High	Low	Average	Change
1	Ferencváros	182,155	20,675	6,771	10,715	+18.2%
2	Diósgyőr	68,060	12,203	2,070	4,254	+24.1%
3	Haladás	55,318	8,294	1,220	3,457	+11.8%
4	Debrecen	60,298	7,002	1,828	3,547	−9.4%
5	Vidi	54,025	11,251	696	3,178	+51.3%^{2}
6	Újpest	50,952	8,719	1,435	2,831	−18.2%
7	Mezőkövesd	38,292	4,032	1,014	2,393	+2.0%
8	MTK	39,565	4,587	1,381	2,473	+81.0%^{1}
9	Kisvárda	36,184	3,385	1,090	2,262	+77.4%^{1}
10	Honvéd	30,603	3,579	500	1,913	−23.8%
11	Puskás Akadémia	22,786	3,838	418	1,340	+11.8%
12	Paks	15,794	2,100	300	987	−4.5%
	League total	654,032	20,675	300	3,303	+13.6%

Source: League matches: NB I 2018/2019
Notes:
1: Played last season in NB/II.
2: Vidi played five games at Pancho Aréna before the opening of the Sóstói Stadion.

== See also ==
- 2018–19 Magyar Kupa
- 2018–19 Nemzeti Bajnokság II
- 2018–19 Nemzeti Bajnokság III
- 2018–19 Megyei Bajnokság I
