= 2019–20 Magyar Kupa =

Tournament details
- Country: Hungary
- Dates: 21 September 2019 – 3 June 2020
- Teams: 128 (Main round)

Final positions
- Champions: Honvéd (8th title)
- Runners-up: Mezőkövesd

Tournament statistics
- Top goal scorer: (Hungary) Ádám Gyurcsó (7 goals)

The 2019–20 Magyar Kupa (English: Hungarian Cup) was the 80th season of Hungary's annual knock-out cup football competition. The title holders were MOL Vidi FC by winning the 2019 Magyar Kupa final. The competition was postponed on 16 March 2020 due to the COVID-19 pandemic and resumed on 23 May. Honvéd won the final by beating Mezőkövesdi SE at the Puskás Aréna.

== Main Tournament ==
On 11 September 2019 the draw took place at the headquarters of the Hungarian Football Federation. This was the first draw in the 2019–20 season where Nemzeti Bajnokság I and Nemzeti Bajnokság II clubs were included.

=== Participating teams ===
Tier	League	No	Teams
1	NBI	12	Honvéd, Debrecen, Diósgyőr, Fehérvár, Ferencváros, Kaposvár, Kisvárda, Mezőkövesd, Paks, Puskás Akadémia, Újpest, Zalaegerszeg
2	NBII	20	^{1}Balmazújváros, Békéscsaba, Budafok, Budaörs, Cegléd, Csákvár, Dorog, Gyirmót, Győr, Kazincbarcika, Monor, Mosonmagyaróvár, MTK Budapest, Nyíregyháza, Siófok, Soroksár, Szombathely, Tiszakécske, Vác, Vasas
3	NBIII (West)	16	III. Kerület, Ajka, Andráshida, BKV Előre, Csepel, Dunaharaszt, Érd, Komárom, Ménfőcsanak, MOL Fehérvár FC II, Nagykanizsa, Pápa, Pénzügyőr, Puskás II, Sárvár, Szabadkikötő
3	NBIII (Centre)	16	Dabas, Dunaújváros, Honvéd II, Hódmezővásárhely, Iváncsa, Kecskemét, Kozármisleny, Makó, Paks II, Pécs, Rákosmente, Szeged, Szekszárd, Szentlőrinc, SZEOL, Taksony
3	NBIII (East)	16	Cigánd, DEAC, Diósgyőr II, Eger, ESMTK, Füzesgyarmat, Gyöngyös, Jászberény, Nyírbátor, Putnok, Sajóbábony, Salgótarján, Sényő, Szolnok, Tiszaújváros, Tállya
4	MBI	40	TBA

_{1}: The license from Balmazújváros was not issued. Therefore, the club could not take part in the 2019–20 Magyar Kupa.

== Round of 128 ==
A total of 128 teams participated in the 6th round of the Magyar Kupa. The new entrants were 12 clubs from the 2019–20 Nemzeti Bajnokság I, 20 clubs from the 2019–20 Nemzeti Bajnokság II, and 48 from the 2019–20 Nemzeti Bajnokság III.

21 September 2019 6th round	Eger (3)	2–4	Fehérvár (1)	Eger
11:45 CET	Pataki 43'; Árvai 81'	Report	47' Hodžić; 52' Futács; 78' 89' Nikolov	Stadium: Szentmarjay Tibor Városi Stadion; Referee: János Takács

21 September 2019 6th round	Érd (3)	0–1	Diósgyőr (1)	Érd
15:00 CET		Report	72' Hasani	Stadium: Érdi Sporttelep; Referee: Tibor Horváth

21 September 2019 6th round	Putnok (3)	0–5	Paks (1)	Putnok
15:00 CET		Report	Hahn 17' (pen.), 22'; Poór 26', 86'; Balogh 30'	Stadium: Várady Béla Sportközpont; Referee: Ádám Németh

21 September 2019 6th round	Unione FC (4)	0–1	MTK Budapest FC (2)	Budapest
15:00 CET		Report	Szatmári 53'	Stadium: Hévízi úti Stadion; Referee: Tünde Anikó Kiss

21 September 2019 6th round	Hódmezővásárhely (4)	0–4 (a.e.t.)	Budaörs (2)	Hódmezővásárhely
15:00 CET		Report	Pethő 94', 98', 113'; Medgyes 106'	Stadium: Városi Stadion; Referee: Péter Antal

21 September 2019 6th round	Dunaharaszti (3)	1–7	Honvéd (1)	Dunaharaszti
15:00 CET	Mendebaba 57'	Report	Batik 4'; Cipf 13'; Kukoč 21'; Banó-Szabó 34'; Kálnoki-Kis 43'; Kulach 76', 90+3'	Stadium: Dunaharaszti MTK Sporttelep; Referee: Dávid Juhász

21 September 2019 6th round	Kelen (3)	0–3	Vác (2)	Budapest
15:00 CET		Report	Mácsik 14'; Magos 57'; Lefler 80'	Stadium: Csepel Stadion; Referee: Bálint Dolnegó

21 September 2019 6th round	Újfehértó (4)	2–6 (a.e.t.)	Ajka (2)	Újfehértó
15:00 CET	Seres 54'; Petics 67'	Report	Oláh 4'; Horváth 52'; Lengyel 97', 105'; E. Nagy 107'; K. Nagy 118'	Stadium: Városi Sportpálya; Referee: Róbert Nagy

21 September 2019 6th round	Sárvár (3)	0–3	Debrecen (1)	Sárvár
15:00 CET		Report	Adeniji 19', 49', 61'	Stadium: Városi Sporttelep; Referee: Márió Görög

21 September 2019 6th round	Bonyhád (4)	0–5	Puskás Akadémia (1)	Bonyhád
15:00 CET		Report	Gyurcsó 2', 37' (pen.), 40'; Tamás 87'; Mebrahtu 90+2'	Stadium: Bonyhádi Sporttelep; Referee: Sára Somogyi

21 September 2019 6th round	Flavius Velence (4)	1–3	Szeged-Csanád Grosics Akadémia (2)	Velence
15:00 CET	Szilágyi 30'	Report	Kristóf 43' (o.g.); Andorka 84'; Sóron 90'	Stadium: Velence Sportpálya; Referee: Ádám Pillók

21 September 2019 6th round	Edelény (4)	0–7	Siófok (2)	Edelény
15:00 CET		Report	Zamostny 2'; Kiss 7'; Balogh 16'; Kővári 35', 56'; Pataki 48' (o.g.); Németh 89'	Stadium: Edelényi Városi Sporttelep; Referee: Norbert Nagy

21 September 2019 6th round	Körösladány (4)	1–5	Békéscsaba (2)	Körösladány
15:00 CET	Ruzsa 7' (pen.)	Report	Olasz 1', 21' (pen.); Gréczi 10', 69'; Hursán 76'	Stadium: Körösladányi Sportpálya; Referee: Aurél Borbás

21 September 2019 6th round	Salgótarján (4)	2–2 (15–14 p)	Szolnok (2)	Salgótarján
15:00 CET	Tarlósi 21'; Novák 58'	Report	Vólent 50'; Simon 52' (pen.)	Stadium: Szojka Ferenc Stadion; Referee: Gábor Kátai

21 September 2019 6th round	Balassagyarmat (3)	2–2 (2–3 p)	Dorog (2)	Balassagyarmat
15:00 CET	Péter 11'; Szita 87'	Report	Nyíri 82'; Vígh 84'	Stadium: Ipolyparti Sporttelep; Referee: Mihály Káprály

21 September 2019 6th round	Hévíz (3)	0–6	Mezőkövesd (1)	Hévíz
15:00 CET		Report	Bertus 7'; Sajbán 11', 28', 30'; Nesterov 26'; Takács 34'	Stadium: Hévízi Sportpálya; Referee: Gábor Barna

21 September 2019 6th round	Hatvan (3)	0–2	Újpest (1)	Hatvan
15:00 CET		Report	Onovo 29'; Nwobodo 55'	Stadium: Hatvani Népkert Sporttelep; Referee: Tamás Móri

21 September 2019 6th round	Szentlőrinc (3)	0–1	Gyirmót (2)	Budapest
15:00 CET		Report	Nagy 70'	Stadium: Szentlőrinc SE Sportelep; Referee: Attila Szommer

21 September 2019 6th round	Soltvadkert (4)	0–4	Kaposvár (1)	Soltvadkert
15:00 CET		Report	Balázs 14'; Vachtler 26'; R. Nagy 28'; K. Nagy 75'	Stadium: Soltvadkert Sprottelep; Referee: Zoltán J. Kovács

21 September 2019 6th round	Berettyóújfalu (4)	2–2 (5–4 p)	Szajol (4)	Berettyóújfalu
15:00 CET	Jancsó 19'; Sándor 99'	Report	Szantmiklósi 51'; Nagy 120' (o.g.)	Stadium: Berettyóújfalusi Sportpálya; Referee: Csaba Sándor

21 September 2019 6th round	Heves (4)	1–3	Füzesgyarmat (3)	Heves
15:00 CET	Borics 62'	Report	Fejes 4'; Karacs 48'; Katona 53'	Stadium: Heves Sportpálya; Referee: Árpád Jakab

21 September 2019 6th round	Cegléd (3)	1–2	Pápa (3)	Cegléd
15:00 CET	Pesti 87'	Report	Szabó 89'; Hanzl 90+4'	Stadium: Zsengellér Gyula Sporttelep; Referee: Ádám Leél-Őssy

21 September 2019 6th round	Nagykanizsa (3)	1–0	Veszprém (3)	Nagykanizsa
15:00 CET	Lőrincz 2'	Report		Stadium: Olajbányász Stadion; Referee: Marcell Derdák

21 September 2019 6th round	Tamási (4)	4–1	Tihany (4)	Tamási
15:00 CET	Farsang 12', 26', 31'; Haruna 27'	Report	B. Horváth 61'	Stadium: Élőfüves Sportpálya; Referee: Gellért Áron Altorjay

21 September 2019 6th round	Balatonlelle (3)	1–3	Dabas (3)	Balatonlelle
15:00 CET	Laczkó 80'	Report	Erős 16'; Popov 45', 56'	Stadium: Balatonlellei Sportpálya; Referee: Ákos Gaál

21 September 2019 6th round	SC Sopron	3–1	Kecskéd (4)	Sopron
15:00 CET	Kocsis 24' (pen.); Purt 58'; Baranyai 76'	Report	Zuggó 69'	Stadium: Káposztás utcai Stadion; Referee: Csanád Héra

21 September 2019 6th round	Csorna (4)	0–2	Tatabánya (4)	Csorna
15:00 CET		Report	R. Szabó 9', 43'	Stadium: Városi Sportpálya; Referee: Patrik Horváth

21 September 2019 6th round	Villány (4)	0–8	Tiszaújváros (3)	Villány
15:00 CET		Report	Nagy 12', 40', 48' (pen.), 71', 77', 89'; Pap 59', 62'	Stadium: Városi Sportpálya; Referee: János Dobai

21 September 2019 6th round	Pétervására (4)	1–1 (2–4 p)	Ménfőcsanak (3)	Pétervására
15:00 CET	Á. Nagy 42'	Report	Németh 9'	Stadium: Bocsi Attila Sporttelep; Referee: Imre Kovács

21 September 2019 6th round	Nagyecsed (4)	1–1 (3–4 p)	Nagybajom (4)	Nagyecsed
15:00 CET	Kóka 54'	Report	Horváth 64'	Stadium: Nagyecsedi Sportpálya; Referee: Tamás Nazsa

21 September 2019 6th round	Balatoni Vasas SE (4)	4–2	Kecskemét (4)	Siófok
15:00 CET	Turós 21' (pen.); Mester 27', 43'; Lakatos 82'	Report	Zsoldos 49' (pen.); Stein 50'	Stadium: Balatoni Vasas Sportpálya; Referee: Máté Kubicsek

21 September 2019 6th round	Gyenesdiás (4)	1–3	Dabas-Gyón (3)	Gyenesdiás
15:00 CET	Bolla 32'	Report	Marsa 47'; Zsivoczky-Pandel 81' (pen.)	Referee: Lee Takács

21 September 2019 6th round	Andráshida (4)	0–6	Kecskemét (3)	Zalaegerszeg
15:00 CET		Report	Asztalos 26' (pen.); Karacs 43'; Erdei 46'; Vladul 85'; Kalamár 86' (o.g.); Szalai 90'	Referee: Bálint Juhász

21 September 2019 6th round	Szekszárd (3)	2–2 (3–4 p)	Lipót (3)	Szekszárd
15:00 CET	Juhász 50'; Péter 73'	Report	Varga 4'; Aréna 85' (o.g.)	Referee: Gábor Oláh

21 September 2019 6th round	Ajka Kristály SE (4)	1–1 (3–4 p)	Balkányi SE (4)	Ajka
15:00 CET	Györkös 55'	Report	Angyal 68'	Referee: Péter Gál

21 September 2019 6th round	Berkenye SE (4)	2–4	Ózdi Kohász (3)	Berkenye
15:00 CET	Mátyás 29', 76'	Report	Gál 3'; Tönkő 65'; Kozics 72', 83' (pen.)	Stadium: Berkenye SE Sportpálya; Referee: László Mencsik

21 September 2019 6th round	Egerszalók SE (4)	1–6	Pécs (3)	Egerszalók
15:00 CEST	Szabó 90'	Report	Máté 33', 76'; Keresztes 53'; Gajág 55'; Koller 70' (pen.); Széles 83'	Stadium: Egerszalók SE Sporttelep; Referee: Gergő Muhari

21 September 2019 6th round	Bogács (4)	0–5	III. Kerület (3)	Bogács
15:00 CEST		Report	Petneházi 35'; Kapronczai 50'; Rajczi 72', 84'; Czvitkovics 81'	Referee: Tamás Tóth

21 September 2019 6th round	Maglód (4)	6–0	Miskolc (4)	Maglód
15:00 CET	Poncok 16'; Rajz 22' (pen.), 42'; Kőbányai 40'; Borsos 61'; Budafai 77'	Report		Stadium: Kertész Károly Stadion; Referee: Bence Erdélyi

21 September 2019 6th round	Szegedi VSE	4–0	Bicske (2)	Szeged
15:00 CET		Report		Stadium: Szegedi Vasutas Sportpálya

21 September 2019 6th round	Magyar Mélyépítő HSE	2–3	Vép VSE	Hajdúszoboszló
15:00 CET	Kálmán 55'; Sólyom 81' (pen.)	Report	Illés 33'; B. Varga 36'; Wágner 61'

21 September 2019 6th round	Móri SE	0–2	Kozármisleny (2)	Mór
18:00 CET		Report

21 September 2019 6th round	Debreceni EAC	2–0	Csákvár (2)	Debrecen
19:00 CET		Report

22 September 2019 6th round	Nádasd FC	0–9	Soroksár (2)	Nádasd
15:00 CET		Report

22 September 2019 6th round	Svábhegy FC	0–6	Kazincbarcika (2)	Budapest
15:00 CET		Report

22 September 2019 6th round	Úrkút	0–1	Vasas (2)	Úrkút
15:00 CET		Report

22 September 2019 6th round	Pilisi LS	0–1	Kisvárda (1)	Pilis
15:00 CET		Report

22 September 2019 6th round	Erzsébeti Spartacus	1–3	Győr (2)	Budapest
15:00 CET		Report

22 September 2019 6th round	Taksony	0–2	Nyíregyháza (2)	Dunaharaszti
15:00 CET		Report

22 September 2019 6th round	Törökszentmiklós	0–5	Budafok (2)	Törökszentmiklós
15:00 CET		Report

22 September 2019 6th round	Szabadkikötő	0–1	Tiszakécske (2)	Budapest
15:00 CET		Report

22 September 2019 6th round	Gyöngyös	0–3	Szombathelyi Haladás (2)	Gyöngyös
15:00 CET		Report

22 September 2019 6th round	Szarvas	8–2	Siklós (2)	Szarvas
15:00 CET		Report

22 September 2019 6th round	ASR Gázgyár	1–0	Makó	Budapest
15:00 CET		Report

22 September 2019 6th round	Csörnöcgyöngye VSE	1–9	Mosonmagyaróvár (3)	Szombathely
15:00 CET		Report

22 September 2019 6th round	Gönyű SE	0–2	BKV Előre (3)	Gönyű
15:00 CET		Report

22 September 2019 6th round	Monor	2–0	Komárom (2)	Monor
15:00 CET		Report

22 September 2019 6th round	Sényő	3–2	Jászberény (2)	Sényő
15:00 CET		Report

22 September 2019 6th round	Sárisápi BSE	0–5	Rákosmente	Sárisáp
15:00 CET		Report

22 September 2019 6th round	Biatorbágy	0–1	Dunaújváros (3)	Biatorbágy
15:00 CET		Report

22 September 2019 6th round	Gellénháza	1–5	Sárbogárd SE (2)	Gellénháza
15:00 CET		Report

25 September 2019 6th round	Kiskunfélegyházi HTK	1–5	Zalaegerszeg (1)	Kiskunfélegyháza
15:00 CET		Report

25 September 2019 6th round	Iváncsa	0–3	Ferencváros (1)	Iváncsa
15:00 CET		Report		Stadium: Iváncsa Sportpálya

== Round of 64 ==
29 October 2019 7th round	Ajka (2)	2–5	Újpest (1)	Ajka
17:30

30 October 2019 7th round	ASR Gázgyár	1–4	Győr (2)
11:30

30 October 2019 7th round	Ménfőcsanak (3)	0–2	Szombathelyi Haladás (2)	Ménfőcsanak
11:30

30 October 2019 7th round	Tiszaújváros (3)	0–3	Fehérvár (1)	Tiszaújváros
11:30

30 October 2019 7th round	Balatoni Vasas SE	0-4	Dabas-Gyón (2)
11:30

30 October 2019 7th round	Mosonmagyaróvár (3)	4–1	Tállya (3)	Mosonmagyaróvár
11:30

30 October 2019 7th round	Dunaújváros (3)	2–1	Nagykanizsa (3)	Dunaújváros
11:30				Stadium: Eszperantó úti Stadion

30 October 2019 7th round	Kazincbarcika (2)	0–2	Honvéd (1)
11:30

30 October 2019 7th round	Dabas (3)	0–3	Diósgyőr (1)
11:30

30 October 2019 7th round	Füzesgyarmat (3)	0–1	Békéscsaba (2)
11:30

30 October 2019 7th round	Vép VSE	1–4	Szeged-Csanád Grosics Akadémia (2)
11:30

30 October 2019 7th round	Tamási (4)	0–2	Monor (2)
11:30

30 October 2019 7th round	BKV Előre (3)	1–3	Ferencváros (1)
11:30

30 October 2019 7th round	Sényő (3)	1–2	Mezőkövesd (1)
11:30

30 October 2019 7th round	Szarvas	2–1	Balkányi SE (4)
11:30

30 October 2019 7th round	Salgótarján (4)	1–7	Paks (1)
11:30

30 October 2019 7th round	III. Kerület (2)	5–0	Nyíregyháza (2)
11:30

30 October 2019 7th round	Pécs (3)	2–0	Rákosmente (3)	Pécs
11:30				Stadium: Stadion PMFC

30 October 2019 7th round	Nagybajom (4)	0–5	Dorog (2)	Nagybajom
11:30

30 October 2019 7th round	Szegedi VSE (3)	2–4	Ózdi Kohász (2)	Szeged
11:30

30 October 2019 7th round	Maglódi TC	0–15	Puskás Akadémia (1)	Maglód
11:30

30 October 2019 7th round	Budaörs (2)	3–7	Zalaegerszeg (1)	Budaörs
11:30

30 October 2019 7th round	Sárbogárd SE (2)	1–3	Vác (2)	Sárbogárd
11:30

30 October 2019 7th round	Debreceni EAC (3)	0–3	MTK Budapest FC (2)	Debrecen
11:30

30 October 2019 7th round	Kozármisleny (2)	1–2	Kisvárda (1)	Kozármisleny
11:30

30 October 2019 7th round	Berettyóújfalu (4)	0–4	Siófok (2)	Berettyóújfalu
11:30

30 October 2019 7th round	SC Sopron	1–1	Budafok (2)	Sopron
17:00

30 October 2019 7th round	Tiszakécske (2)	0–1	Kaposvár (1)	Tiszakécske
17:00

30 October 2019 7th round	Kecskeméti TE (3)	0–1	Lipót (2)	Kecskemét
17:00

30 October 2019 7th round	Gyirmót (2)	3–0	Soroksár (2)	Győr
17:00				Stadium: Ménfői úti Stadion

30 October 2019 7th round	Tatabánya (4)	0–2	Debrecen (3)	Tatabánya
17:00

30 October 2019 7th round	Pápa (3)	3–4	Vasas (2)	Pápa
19:00

== Round of 32 ==
4 December 2019 round of 32	Monor	1–3	Honvéd (1)	Monor

4 December 2019 round of 32	MTK Budapest FC (2)	1–0	Diósgyőr (1)	Budapest
				Stadium: Hidegkuti Nándor Stadion

4 December 2019 round of 32	Ózdi Kohász (2)	0–3	Kaposvár (1)	Ózd

4 December 2019 round of 32	Pécs (3)	1–0	Kisvárda (1)	Pécs
				Stadium: Stadion PMFC

4 December 2019 round of 32	Győr (2)	2–3	Mezőkövesd (1)	Győr
				Stadium: ETO Park

4 December 2019 round of 32	Vác (2)	0–3	Újpest (1)	Vác
				Stadium: Ligeti Stadion

4 December 2019 round of 32	Dorog (2)	3–3	Debrecen	Dorog
				Stadium: Buzánszky Jenő Stadion

4 December 2019 round of 32	Szarvas	0–2	Zalaegerszeg (1)	Szarvas

4 December 2019 round of 32	Dabas-Gyón (2)	0–3	Puskás Akadémia (1)	Dabas

4 December 2019 round of 32	Békéscsaba (2)	2–0	Ferencváros (1)	Békéscsaba
				Stadium: Kórház utcai Stadion

4 December 2019 round of 32	Mosonmagyaróvár (3)	0–4	Paks (1)	Mosonmagyaróvár

4 December 2019 round of 32	Szeged-Csanád Grosics Akadémia (2)	0–1	Fehérvár (1)	Szeged
				Stadium: Szent Gellért Fórum

4 December 2019 round of 32	Dunaújváros (3)	2–1	Siófok (2)	Dunaújváros
				Stadium: Eszperantó úti Stadion

4 December 2019 round of 32	Lipót (2)	3–1	Gyirmót (2)	Lipót

4 December 2019 round of 32	III. Kerület (2)	2–1	Vasas (2)	Budapest
				Stadium: Hévízi úti Stadion

4 December 2019 round of 32	Szombathelyi Haladás (2)	2–1	Budafok (2)	Szombathely
				Stadium: Haladás Sportkomplexum

== Round of 16 ==
=== 1st leg ===
12 February 2020 round of 16	Honvéd (1)	1–0	Szombathelyi Haladás (2)

12 February 2020 round of 16	Mezőkövesd (1)	2–1	Kaposvár (1)	Mezőkövesd
				Attendance: Mezőkövesdi Városi Stadion

12 February 2020 round of 16	Lipót (3)	3–1	Zalaegerszeg (1)	Lipót

12 February 2020 round of 16	Pécs (3)	1–2	Paks (1)	Pécs
				Stadium: Stadion PMFC

12 February 2020 round of 16	Békéscsaba (2)	0–3	Puskás Akadémia (1)	Békéscsaba
				Stadium: Kórház utcai Stadion

12 February 2020 round of 16	MTK Budapest FC (2)	3–0	Dunaújváros (3)	Budapest
				Stadium: Hidegkuti Nándor Stadion

12 February 2020 round of 16	Újpest (1)	0–0	Fehérvár (1)	Budapest
				Stadium: Szusza Ferenc Stadion

12 February 2020 round of 16	Dorog (2)	4–1	III. Kerület (3)	Dorog
				Stadium: Buzánszky Jenő Stadion

=== 2nd leg ===
19 February 2020 round of 16	Szombathelyi Haladás (2)	2–1	Honvéd (1)	Szombathely
				Stadium: Haladás Sportkomplexum

19 February 2020 round of 16	Kaposvár (1)	1–3	Mezőkövesd (1)	Kaposvár
				Stadium: Rákóczi Stadion

19 February 2020 round of 16	Zalaegerszeg (1)	5–1	Lipót (3)	Zalaegerszeg
				Stadium: ZTE Arena

19 February 2020 round of 16	Paks (1)	1–0	Pécs (3)	Paks
				Stadium: Fehérvári úti Stadion

19 February 2020 round of 16	Puskás Akadémia (1)	3–0	Békéscsaba (2)	Felcsút
				Stadium: Pancho Aréna

19 February 2020 round of 16	Dunaújváros (3)	0–2	MTK Budapest FC (2)

19 February 2020 round of 16	Fehérvár (1)	1–0	Újpest (1)	Székesfehérvár
				Stadium: MOL Aréna Sóstó

19 February 2020 round of 16	III. Kerület (3)	0–2	Dorog (2)

== Quarter-finals ==
=== 1st leg ===
3 March 2020 Quarter-final	Puskás Akadémia (1)	0–1	Mezőkövesd (1)	Felcsút
19:50				Stadium: Puskás Akadémia Pancho Aréna

4 March 2020 Quarter-final	Dorog (2)	0–1	MTK Budapest FC (2)	Dorog
15:30				Stadium: Buzánszky Jenő Stadion

4 March 2020 Quarter-final	Paks (1)	0–0	Honvéd (1)	Paks
19:00				Stadium: Fehérvári úti Stadion

4 March 2020 Quarter-final	Zalaegerszeg (1)	2–0	Fehérvár (1)	Zalaegerszeg
21:00				Stadium: ZTE-Aréna

=== 2nd leg ===
11 March 2020 Quarter-final	Mezőkövesd (1)	1–1	Puskás Akadémia (1)	Mezőkövesd
19:00				Stadium: Városi Stadion

11 March 2020 Quarter-final	MTK Budapest FC (2)	3–0	Dorog (2)	Budapest
19:00				Stadium: Hidegkuti Nándor

11 March 2020 Quarter-final	Honvéd (1)	2–0	Paks (1)
19:00

11 March 2020 Quarter-final	Fehérvár (1)	5–0	Zalaegerszeg (1)	Székesfehérvár
19:00				Stadium: MOL Aréna Sóstó

== Semi-finals ==
On 18 May 2020, it was announced that Honvéd would host MTK Budapest FC at the Puskás Aréna.

=== 1st leg ===
23 May 2020 Semi-final	Mezőkövesd (1)	1–1	Fehérvár (1)	Mezőkövesd
18:00	Pillár 80'	Report	Pátkai 12'	Stadium: Mezőkövesdi Városi Stadion; Referee: Ádám Farkas

23 May 2020 Semi-final	MTK Budapest (2)	0–0	Honvéd (1)	Budapest
20:05		Report		Stadium: Hidegkuti Nándor Stadion; Referee: József Erdős

=== 2nd leg ===
26 May 2020 Semi-final	Fehérvár (1)	2–2 (3–3 (a) agg.)	Mezőkövesd (1)	Székesfehérvár
18:00	Hodžić 63'; Stopira 86'	[Report]	Zivzivadze 8'; Pekár 54'	Stadium: MOL Aréna Sóstó

26 May 2020 Semi-final	Honvéd (1)	0–0 (a.e.t.) (0–0 agg.) (5–4 p)	MTK Budapest (2)	Budapest
21:00		[Report]		Stadium: Puskás Aréna
	Penalties
	Lovrić (penalty scored); Szendrei (penalty scored); Moutari (penalty scored); Uzoma (penalty missed); Kukoč (penalty scored); Hidi (penalty scored)		Kanta (penalty missed); Pintér (penalty scored); Prosser (penalty scored); Bognár (penalty scored); Cseke (penalty scored); Gera (penalty missed)

== Final ==
The final was played at the Puskás Aréna in which 10,000 spectators were seated following strict regulations after COVID-19 pandemic.

3 June 2020 Final	Honvéd (1)	2–1	Mezőkövesd (1)	Budapest
20:00	Lovrić 33'; Kamber 56'	[Report]	Pekár 37'	Stadium: Puskás Aréna; Attendance: 10,000; Referee: Tamás Bognár

== Top goalscorers ==
As of 14 January 2020

Rank	Player	Club	Goals
1	(Hungary) Ádám Gyurcsó	Puskás Akadémia	7
2	(Hungary) Dávid Balázs Nagy	Tiszaújváros	6
3	(Hungary) Barnabás Kozics	Ózdi Kohász	5
4	(Hungary) Dániel Böde	Paks	4
4	(Hungary) Martin Hudák	Zalaegerszeg	4
4	(Hungary) János Máté	Pécs	4
4	(Hungary) Dominik Szalka	Mosonmagyaróvár	4
4	(Romania) Nándor Tamás	Puskás Akadémia	4
9	22 players		3

== See also ==
- 2019–20 Nemzeti Bajnokság I
- 2019–20 Nemzeti Bajnokság II
- 2019–20 Nemzeti Bajnokság III
