= 2018–19 Magyar Kupa =

Tournament details
- Country: Hungary
- Dates: 22 September 2018 – 25 May 2019
- Teams: 128 (Main round)

Final positions
- Champions: Vidi (2nd title)
- Runners-up: Honvéd

Tournament statistics
- Top goal scorer: (Iceland) Kjartan Finnbogason (6 goals)

The 2018–19 Magyar Kupa (English: Hungarian Cup) was the 79th season of Hungary's annual knock-out cup football competition. Vidi FC won the competition by beating Budapest Honvéd FC in the final held at Groupama Aréna on 25 May 2019.

== Main Tournament ==
On 4 September the draw took place at the headquarters of the Hungarian Football Federation. This was the first draw in the 2018–19 season where Nemzeti Bajnokság I and Nemzeti Bajnokság II clubs were included.

=== Participating teams ===
Tier	League	No	Teams
1	NBI	12	Debrecen, Diósgyőr, Ferencváros, Haladás, Honvéd, Kisvárda, Mezőkövesd, MTK, Paks, Puskás Akadémia, Újpest, Vidi
2	NBII	20	Balmazújváros, Békéscsaba, Budafok, Budaörs, Cegléd, Csákvár, Dorog, Gyirmót, Győr, Kaposvár, Kazincbarcika, Monor, Mosonmagyaróvár, Nyíregyháza, Siófok, Soroksár, Tiszakécske, Vác, Vasas, Zalaegerszeg
3	NBIII (West)	16	III. Kerület, Ajka, Andráshida, BKV Előre, Csepel, Dunaharaszt, Érd, Komárom, Ménfőcsanak, Nagykanizsa, Pápa, Pénzügyőr, Puskás II, Sárvár, Szabadkikötő, Vidi II
3	NBIII (Centre)	16	Dabas, Dunaújváros, Honvéd II, Hódmezővásárhely, Iváncsa, Kecskemét, Kozármisleny, Makó, Paks II, Pécs, Rákosmente, Szeged, Szekszárd, Szentlőrinc, SZEOL, Taksony
3	NBIII (East)	16	Cigánd, DEAC, Diósgyőr II, Eger, ESMTK, Füzesgyarmat, Gyöngyös, Jászberény, Nyírbátor, Putnok, Sajóbábony, Salgótarján, Sényő, Szolnok, Tiszaújváros, Tállya
4	MBI	40	Balkanyi, Bátaszék, Berkenye, Biatorbágy, Bonyhád, Bőny, Budapesti VSC, Csesztreg, Edelény, Fegyvernek, Felsőtárkány, Fővárosi Vízművek, Fűzfő, Gesztely, Gyöngyöshalász, Hatvan, Hévíz, Jánoshalma, Jánossomorja, Kalocsa, Király, Körösladány, Lipót, Lukácsháza, Maroshegy, Nagyatád, Nagykörös, Oroszlány, Öttevényi, Pécsi Tudományegyetem, Sárisáp, Sárrétudvari, Siklós, Szarvas, Tatabánya, Teskánd, Tiszafüred, Tiszasziget, Tordas, Úrkút

== Round of 128 ==
A total of 128 teams participated in the 6th round of the Magyar Kupa. The new entrants were 12 clubs from the 2018–19 Nemzeti Bajnokság I, 20 clubs from the 2018–19 Nemzeti Bajnokság II, and 48 from the 2018–19 Nemzeti Bajnokság III.

22 September 2018	Nyírbátor (3)	0–3	Nyíregyháza (2)	Nyíregyháza
12:00 CET		Report

22 September 2018	Nagyatád (4)	1–2	Pénzügyőr (3)	Nagyatád
13:00 CET		Report

22 September 2018	Nagykanizsa (3)	0–1	Iváncsa (3)	Nagykanizsa
13:30 CET		Report

22 September 2018	Fegyvernek (4)	0–6	Monor (2)	Fegyvernek
14:00 CET		[ Report]

22 September 2018	Szentlőrinc (3)	0–3	Békéscsaba (2)	Budapest
14:00 CET		[ Report]

22 September 2018	Hódmezővásárhely (3)	1–3	Vác (2)	Hódmezővásárhely
14:00 CET		[ Report]

22 September 2018	Kecskeméti LC (3)	0–1	Körmend	Kecskemét
14:00 CET		[ Report]

22 September 2018	Pécsi Tudományegyetem (4)	1–4	Ajka (3)	Pécs
14:00 CET		[ Report]

22 September 2018	Körösladány (4)	2–8	Budaörs (2)	Körösladány
14:00 CET		[ Report]

22 September 2018	Szegedi VSE (3)	0–2	Ferencváros (1)	Szeged
15:00 CET		[ Report]

22 September 2018	Bátaszék (4)	1–7	Újpest (1)	Bátaszék
15:00 CET		[ Report]

22 September 2018	Király (4)	0–3	Kaposvár (2)
15:00 CET		[ Report]

22 September 2018	Kozármisleny (3)	0–4	Győr (2)	Kozármisleny
15:00 CET		[ Report]

22 September 2018	BKV Előre (3)	1–2	Debrecen (1)	Budapest
15:00 CET		[ Report]

22 September 2018	Szekszárd (3)	1–1	Dorog (2)	Szekszárd
15:00 CET		[ Report]

22 September 2018	Berkenye (4)	0–5	Tiszakécske (2)	Berkenye
15:00 CET		[ Report]

22 September 2018	Komárom (3)	1–3	Puskás Akadémia (1)	Komárom
15:00 CET		[ Report]

22 September 2018	Sárrétudvari (4)	0–1	Zalaegerszeg (2)	Sárrétudvari
15:00 CET		[ Report]

22 September 2018	Tállya (3)	0–8	MTK (1)	Tállya
15:00 CET		[ Report]

22 September 2018	Fűzfő (4)	0–5	Soroksár (2)	Balatonfűzfő
15:00 CET		[ Report]

22 September 2018	Edelény (4)	1–6	Sárvár (3)	Edelény
15:00 CET		[ Report]

22 September 2018	Gesztely (4)	0–1	Sajóbábony (3)	Gesztely
15:00 CET		[ Report]

22 September 2018	Tiszafüred (4)	0–2	Dabas–Gyón	Tiszafüred
15:00 CET		[ Report]

22 September 2018	Úrkút (4)	1–1 (p.)	Balatonlelle	Úrkút
15:00 CET		[ Report]

22 September 2018	Csesztreg (4)	0–4	Makó (3)	Csesztreg
15:00 CET		[ Report]

22 September 2018	Maroshegy (4)	0–2	Taksony (3)	Maroshegy
15:00 CET		[ Report]

22 September 2018	Lukácsháza (4)	1–4	Balassagyarmat (4)	Lukácsháza
15:00 CET		[ Report]

22 September 2018	Tiszasziget (4)	1–3	Tiszaújváros (3)	Tiszasziget
15:00 CET		[ Report]

22 September 2018	Siklós (4)	0–5	Paks (1)	Siklós
15:00 CET		[ Report]

22 September 2018	Pécs (3)	1–2	Kazincbarcika (2)	Pécs
15:00 CET		[ Report]		Stadium: Stadion PMFC

22 September 2018	Putnok (3)	0–2	Csákvár (2)	Putnok
15:00 CET		[ Report]

22 September 2018	Szeged 2011 (3)	0–1	Siófok (2)	Szeged
15:00 CET		[ Report]

22 September 2018	Fővárosi Vízművek (4)	0–5	Mezőkövesd (1)	Budapest
15:00 CET		[ Report]

22 September 2018	Felsőtárkány (4)	1–3 (a.e.t.)	Ménfőcsanak (3)	Felsőtárkány
15:00 CET		[ Report]

22 September 2018	Lipót (4)	3–2	Kecskeméti TE (3)
15:00 CET		[ Report]

22 September 2018	Biatorbágy (4)	4–2	Balatonfüred (4)	Biatorbágy
15:00 CET		[ Report]

22 September 2018	Dunaharaszti (3)	0–1	Szentlőrinc (3)	Dunaharaszti
15:00 CET		[ Report]

22 September 2018	Teskánd (4)	3–0 (a.e.t.)	Mezőfalva (4)	Teskánd
15:00 CET		[ Report]

22 September 2018	Rákosmente (3)	1–1 (p)	Szabadkikötő (3)	Budapest
15:00 CET		[ Report]

22 September 2018	Tatabánya (4)	3–2	Hajdúböszörmény (4)	Tatabánya
17:00 CET		[ Report]

22 September 2018	Budapesti VSC (4)	0–1	Érd (3)	Budapest
18:00 CET		[ Report]		Stadium: Szőnyi úti Stadion

23 September 2018	Bőny (4)	0–6	Honvéd (1)	Bőny
12:30 CET		[ Report]

23 September 2018	Cigánd (3)	0–2	Vidi (1)	Cigánd
13:00 CET		[ Report]

23 September 2018	Balkanyi (4)	1–3 (a.e.t.)	Andráshida (3)	Balkany
14:00 CET		[ Report]

23 September 2018	Öttevényi (4)	0–1	Gyöngyös (3)	Öttevény
14:00 CET		[ Report]

23 September 2018	Kalocsa (4)	1–0	Ibrány (4)	Kalocsa
14:00 CET		[ Report]

23 September 2018	Bonyhád (4)	0–3	Budafok (2)	Bonyhád
15:00 CET		[ Report]

23 September 2018	Gyönygyöshalász (4)	1–5	Gyirmót (2)	Gyöngyöshalász
14:00 CET		[ Report]

23 September 2018	Szolnok (3)	0–1	Kisvárda (1)	Szolnok
15:00 CET		[ Report]		Stadium: Tiszaligeti Stadion

23 September 2018	Csepel (3)	0–2	Haladás (1)	Csepel
15:00 CET		[ Report]		Stadium: Béke téri Stadion

23 September 2018	Oroszlány (4)	1–0	Ózdi (4)	Oroszlány
15:00 CET		[ Report]

23 September 2018	Hévíz (4)	2–4 (a.e.t.)	Pápai PFC (3)	Hévíz
15:00 CET		[ Report]

23 September 2018	Sárisápi Bányász (4)	0–1	Vecsés (4)	Sárisáp
15:00 CET		[ Report]

23 September 2018	Dabas (3)	1–0	Salgótarján (3)	Dabas
15:00 CET		[ Report]

23 September 2018	Jánossomorja (4)	0–4	III. Kerület (3)	Jánossomorja
15:00 CET		[ Report]

23 September 2018	Nagykörösi Kinizsi (4)	1–4	Vasas (2)	Nagykörös
15:00 CET		[ Report]

23 September 2018	Erzsébet (3)	1–3	Diósgyőr (1)	Budapest
15:00 CET		[ Report]

23 September 2018	Szegedi EOL (3)	2–0	Balmazújváros (2)	Szeged
15:00 CET		[ Report]

23 September 2018	Hatvan (4)	0–1	Cegléd (2)	Hatvan
15:00 CET		[ Report]

23 September 2018	Jászberény (3)	2–1	Mosonmagyaróvár (2)	Jászberény
15:00 CET		[ Report]

23 September 2018	Jánoshalmi (4)	2–3 (a.e.t.)	Füzesgyarmat (3)	Jánoshalma
15:00 CET		[ Report]

23 September 2018	Eger (3)	0–5	Dunaújváros (3)	Eger
15:00 CET		[ Report]

23 September 2018	Szarvas (4)	4–4 (p)	Debreceni EAC (3)	Szarvas
15:00 CET		[ Report]

23 September 2018	Tordas (4)	3–3 (p)	Sényő (3)	Tordas
15:00 CET		[ Report]

Updated to games played on 11 May 2018

== Round of 64 ==
On 28 September 2018 the draw of the second round proper took place at the headquarters of the Hungarian Football Federation.

30 October 2018	Zalaegerszeg (2)	0–2	Diósgyőr (1)	Zalaegerszeg
20:00 CET		Report		Stadium: ZTE Arena

31 October 2018	III. Kerület	2–1	Gyirmót (2)	Budapest
12:00 CET		[ Report]

31 October 2018	Szarvas	1–3	Haladás (1)	Szarvas
12:30 CET		[ Report]

31 October 2018	Sárvár (3)	0–4	Ferencváros (1)	Sárvár
12:30 CET		Report; Report	11' 83' 88'Finnbogason; 50' Böde	Attendance: 2500; Referee: Szilasi

31 October 2018	Gyöngyös	0–4	Kisvárda (1)	Gyöngyös
12:30 CET		[ Report]

31 October 2018	Vecsés	0–5	MTK (1)	Vecsés
12:30 CET		[ Report]

31 October 2018	Teskánd	0–3	Debrecen (1)	Teskánd
12:30 CET		[ Report]

31 October 2018	Kazincbarcika	2–4	Vasas (2)	Kazincbarcika
12:30 CET		[ Report]

31 October 2018	Érd	2–1 (a.e.t.)	Monor	Érd
12:30 CET		[ Report]

31 October 2018	Lipót	2–4	Ajka	Budapest
12:30 CET		[ Report]

31 October 2018	Dabas	0–1	Tiszakécske (2)	Dabas
12:30 CET		[ Report]

31 October 2018	Budaörs	5–0	Cegléd	Budaörs
12:30 CET		[ Report]

31 October 2018	Sényő	2–1	Makó	Sényő
12:30 CET		[ Report]

31 October 2018	Dabas–Gyón	0–1	Pénzügyőr	Dabas
12:30 CET		[ Report]

31 October 2018	Balassagyarmat	1–3	Taksony	Balassagyarmat
12:30 CET		[ Report]

31 October 2018	Szekszárd	1–3	Budafok	Szekszárd
12:30 CET		[ Report]

31 October 2018	Iváncsa	1–0	Pápa	Iváncsa
12:30 CET		[ Report]

31 October 2018	Biatorbágy	0–4	Szentlőrinc	Biatorbágy
12:30 CET		[ Report]

31 October 2018	Balatonlelle	0–2	Tiszaújváros	Balatonlelle
12:30 CET		[ Report]

31 October 2018	Füzesgyarmat	2–0	Szabadkikötő	Füzesgyarmat
12:30 CET		[ Report]

31 October 2018	Oroszlány	2–6 (a.e.t.)	Sajóbábony	Oroszlány
12:30 CET		[ Report]

31 October 2018	Andráshida	1–0	Nyíregyháza	Zalaegerszeg
12:30 CET		[ Report]

31 October 2018	Körmend	0–7	Soroksár	Körmend
12:30 CET		[ Report]

31 October 2018	Kalocsa	0–1	Siófok	Kalocsa
12:30 CET		[ Report]

31 October 2018	Szegedi EOL	1–2	Kaposvár	Szeged
12:30 CET		[ Report]

31 October 2018	Csákvár	1–2	Paks (1)	Csákvár
17:00 CET		[ Report]

31 October 2018	Dunaújváros	0–2	Puskás Akadémia (1)	Dunaújváros
17:00 CET		[ Report]		Stadium: Eszperantó úti Stadion

31 October 2018	Tatabánya	0–2	Békéscsaba (2)	Tatabánya
17:00 CET		[ Report]

31 October 2018	Jászberény	0–1	Honvéd (1)	Jászberény
18:00 CET		[ Report]

31 October 2018	Vác	1–3	Vidi (1)	Budapest
18:00 CET	Zsolnai 9'	Report; Report	8' Hangya; 30' Hodžić; 58' Šćepović	Stadium: Szusza Ferenc Stadion; Attendance: 450; Referee: Ádám Pillók

31 October 2018	Győr (2)	2–3 (a.e.t.)	Újpest (1)	Győr
20:00 CET		[ Report]		Stadium: ETO Park

Note: Vác FC played their home match against Vidi at Szusza Ferenc Stadion due to the reconstruction of their original home stadium, Ligeti Stadion.

== Round of 32 ==
On 31 October 2018 the draw of the second round proper took place at the headquarters of the Hungarian Football Federation.

4 December 2018 8th round	Pénzügyőr	0–6	Puskás Akadémia (1)	Budapest
11:00 CET		Report	29' 80' Radó; 49' Vega; 57' Latifi 85' Osváth; Zsidai 88'	Referee: Róbert Nagy

5 December 2018 8th round	Szentlőrinc	1–4	Kisvárda (1)	Szentlőrinc
12:00 CET	Hleba 58'	Report	91' 108' Ilić; 105' Horváth; 109' Negruț	Stadium: Szentlőrinc Sporttelep; Referee: Gergely Kovács

4 December 2018 8th round	III. Kerület	0–6	Mezőkövesd (1)	Budapest
12:00 CET		Report	28' Vayda; 51' Silye; 67' 69' Dražić; 72' 85' Földi	Referee: Gergő Bogár

4 December 2018 8th round	Sajóbábony	0–1	Taksony	Sajóbábony
12:00 CET		Report	35' Szilágyi	Referee: Tamás Berényi

4 December 2018 8th round	Vasas	1–2	Debrecen (1)	Budapest
20:00 CET	Király 61'	Report	45' Bódi; 71' Jovanović	Stadium: Szusza Ferenc Stadion; Referee: Gergely Szőts

5 December 2018 8th round	Budaörs (2)	5–3	Diósgyőr (1)	Tatabánya
20:00 CET	Csiki 9'; Gyurácz 14'; Medgyes 32' 38'; Sajban 86'	Report	62' 91' Vernes; 89' Brković	Stadium: Grosics Gyula Stadion; Referee: Csaba Pintér

5 December 2018 8th round	Sényő	0–4	Ferencváros (1)	Sényő
12:00 CET		Report	50' 62' Finnbogason; 76' Georgijević; 92' Lovrencsics	Stadium: Sényő Sportpálya; Referee: Ádám Németh

5 December 2018 8th round	Tiszaújváros	0–4	Honvéd (1)	Tiszaújváros
12:00 CET		Report	46' Tischler; 51' Lovrić; 79' Banó-Szabó; 89' Májer	Stadium: Tiszaújváros Sportcentrum; Referee: János Takács

5 December 2018 8th round	Iváncsa	2–4	Haladás (1)	Iváncsa
12:00 CET	Büki 53'; Pribék 79'	Report	10' 32' Grumić; 29' Jagodics; 83' Beneš

5 December 2018 8th round	Érd	0–0 (3–4 p)	Andráshida (3)	Érd
12:00 CET		Report		Stadium: Érdi Sportelep; Referee: Gábor Barna

5 December 2018 8th round	Füzesgyarmat	0–1	Tiszakécske (2)	Füzesgyarmat
12:00 CET		Report	40' Batizi-Pócsi	Stadium: Lázár Gyula Városi Sportelep; Referee: Norbert Nagy

5 December 2018 8th round	Soroksár (2)	2–0	Békéscsaba	Soroksár
12:00 CET	Gyömbér 27'; Tamás 79'	Report		Stadium: Szamosi Mihály Sporttelep; Referee: Attila Molnár

5 December 2018 8th round	Ajka (3)	2–1	MTK (1)	Ajka
15:00 CET	Nagy 40'; Horváth 68'	Report	8' Kanta	Referee: Zoltán J. Kovács

5 December 2018 8th round	Budafok	1–2	Vidi (1)	Budapest
15:00 CET	Oláh 43'	Report	6' Nego; 79' Šćepović	Stadium: Budafoki MTE Sporttelep; Referee: Balázs Böcskei

5 December 2018 8th round	Siófok	2–2 (5–6 p)	Paks (1)	Siófok
15:00 CET	Tóth 6'; Elek 69'	Report	44' Gévay; Bertus 84'

4 December 2018 8th round	Kaposvár (2)	0–1	Újpest (1)	Kaposvár
18:00 CET	Borbély 91'	Report

== Round of 16 ==
=== 1st leg ===
On 5 December 2018 the draw of the 9th round took place.

19 February 2019 9th round	Ajka (3)	2–3	Debrecen (1)	Ajka
18:30 CET	Illés 61' Kenderes 73'	Report	59' Takács; 66' Kuti; 91' Pintér	Referee: Gergő Bogár

20 February 2019 9th round	Soroksár (2)	3–2	Andráshida (3)	Soroksár
14:00 CET	Lőrinczy 9'; Erdélyi 47' 65'	Report	26' 34' Fábián	Referee: Róbert Nagy

20 February 2019 9th round	Budaörs (2)	2–1	Kaposvár (2)	Budaörs
14:00 CET	Stieber 35'; Sajbán 78'	Report	90' Rajczi	Referee: Gergely Szőts

20 February 2019 9th round	Tiszakécske (2)	0–1	Honvéd (1)	Tiszakécske
14:00 CET		Report	35' Ben-Hatira	Referee: János Takács

20 February 2019 9th round	Taksony (3)	0–1	Vidi (1)	Taksony
14:00 CET		Report	78' Hodžić	Referee: Bence Csonka

20 February 2019 9th round	Puskás Akadémia (1)	1–2	Paks (1)	Felcsút
15:00 CET	Radó 49'	Report	11' Egerszegi; 87' Hahn	Stadium: Pancho Aréna; Referee: József Erdős

20 February 2019 9th round	Mezőkövesd (1)	0–0	Haladás (1)	Mezőkövesd
17:00 CET		Report		Referee: Ádám Németh

20 February 2019 9th round	Ferencváros (1)	2–0	Kisvárda (1)	Budapest
18:00 CET	54' Lanzafame; 86' Böde	Report		Stadium: Groupama Aréna; Referee: Csaba Pintér

=== 2nd leg ===
26 February 2019 9th round	Paks (1)	1–3 (3–4 agg.)	Puskás Akadémia (1)	Paks
17:00 CET	Lenzsér 17'	Report	23' 75' 82' (p.) Latifi	Stadium: Fehérvári úti Stadion; Referee: Sándor Andó-Szabó

26 February 2019 9th round	Debrecen (1)	1–1 (4–3 agg.)	Ajka (3)	Debrecen
17:00 CET	Takács 54'	Report	69' Kovács	Stadium: Nagyerdei Stadion; Referee: László Lovas

26 February 2019 9th round	Haladás (1)	0–1 (0–1 agg.)	Mezőkövesd (1)	Mezőkövesd
17:30 CET		Report	91' Koszta	Stadium: Városi Stadion; Referee: Attila Molnár

26 February 2019 9th round	Kisvárda (1)	1–1 (1–3 agg.)	Ferencváros (1)	Kisvárda
20:00 CET	Grozav 67' (p.)	Report	33' Gorriarán	Stadium: Várkerti Stadion; Referee: Róbert Nagy

27 February 2019 9th round	Andráshida (3)	0–1 (2–4 agg.)	Soroksár (2)	Zalaegerszeg
13:00 CET		Report	2' Lakatos	Stadium: Andráshia Sporttelep; Referee: Ákos Gaál

27 February 2019 9th round	Honvéd (1)	1–1 (2–1 agg.)	Tiszakécske (2)	Budapest
18:00 CET	Danilo 30'	Report	47' Szabó	Stadium: Hidegkuti Nándor Stadion; Referee: Szabolcs Szilasi

27 February 2019 9th round	Vidi (1)	3–0 (4–0 agg.)	Taksony (1)	Székesfehérvár
18:00 CET	Huszti 26' 42'; Hadžić 32'	Report		Stadium: MOL Aréna Sóstó; Referee: Gábor Barna

27 February 2019 9th round	Kaposvár (2)	0–0 (1–2 agg.)	Budaörs (2)	Kaposvár
20:00 CET		Report		Stadium: Stadion Kaposvár Rákóczi; Referee: Péter Solymosi

== Quarter-finals ==
On 27 February 2019 the draw of the quarter finals took place at the studio of M4.

=== 1st leg ===
12 March 2019 Quarter finals	Debrecen (1)	1–0	Mezőkövesd (1)	Debrecen
18:00 CET	Zsóri 58'	Report		Stadium: Nagyerdei Stadion; Referee: Sándor Andó-Szabó

13 March 2019 Quarter finals	Budaörs (2)	1–2	Honvéd (1)	Tatabánya
14:30 CET	Fejős 22'	Report	63' 77' Ngog	Stadium: Grosics Gyula Stadion; Referee: Gábor Péter Kovács

13 March 2019 Quarter finals	Puskás Akadémia (1)	1–1	Soroksár (2)	Felcsút
15:00 CET	Martínez 40'	Report	75' Orosz	Stadium: Pancho Aréna; Referee: Szabolcs Szilasi

13 March 2019 Quarter finals	Ferencváros (1)	1–2	Vidi (1)	Budapest
18:00 CET	27' Gorriarán	Report	6' Juhász; 58' Vinícius	Stadium: Groupama Aréna; Referee: Péter Solymosi

=== 2nd leg ===
2 April 2019 Quarter finals	Mezőkövesd (1)	1–2 (1–3 agg.)	Debrecen (1)	Mezőkövesd
20:00 CET	Dražić 45'	Report	61' Takács; 87' Csősz	Stadium: Városi Stadion; Referee: Gergely Szőts

3 April 2019 Quarter finals	Soroksár (2)	1–1 (2–2 agg.) (5–4 p)	Puskás Akadémia (1)	Budapest
15:30 CET	Lőrinczy 83'		31' Arabuli	Stadium: Szamosi Mihály Sporttelep; Attendance: 1500

3 April 2019 Quarter finals	Vidi (1)	2–0 (4–1 agg.)	Ferencváros (1)	Székesfehérvár
18:00 CET	Nikolov 58'; Milanov 82'			Stadium: MOL Aréna Sóstó; Attendance: 6202

3 April 2019 Quarter finals	Honvéd (1)	4–2 (6–3 agg.)	Budaörs (2)	Budapest
18:00 CET	Ngog 3', 43', 50'; Filip Holender 28'		66' Sajaban; 88' Fejos	Stadium: Hidegkuti Nándor Stadion

== Semi-finals ==
=== 1st leg ===
16 April 2019 Semi finals	Vidi (1)	1–0	Debrecen (1)	Székesfehérvár
11:00 CET	Futács 3'	Report		Stadium: MOL Aréna Sóstó

17 April 2019 Semi finals	Honvéd (1)	2–1	Soroksár (2)	Budapest
11:00 CET	Holender 57'; Kálnoki-Kis 86'	Report	79' Gyömbér	Stadium: Hidegkuti Nándor Stadion

=== 2nd leg ===
23 April 2019 Semi finals	Debrecen (1)	0–3 (0–4 agg.)	Vidi (1)	Debrecen
13:00 CET		Report	66' Futacs; 72' Elek; 90+2' Huszti	Stadium: Nagyerdei Stadion

24 April 2019 Semi finals	Soroksár (2)	0–3 (1–5 agg.)	Honvéd (1)	Budapest
08:00 CET		Report	16' (p.) Ben-Hatira; 89' Danilo; 90+1' Tischler	Stadium: Szamosi Mihály Sporttelep

== Final ==
25 May 2019	Honvéd (1)	1–2	Vidi (1)	Budapest
19:30	Holender 14' (pen.)	Report	Šćepović 79'; Hadžić 90+1'	Stadium: Groupama Arena; Attendance: 12,777; Referee: Zoltán Iványi

== Top scorers ==
Bold text indicates players and teams who are still active in the competition.

Rank	Player	Club	Goals
1	(Iceland) Kjartan Finnbogason	Ferencváros	6
2	(Albania) Liridon Latifi	Puskás Akadémia	5
3	(Hungary) Róbert Lakatos	Sajóbábony	4
3	(Hungary) Sinan Medgyes	Budaörs	4

== See also ==
- 2018–19 Nemzeti Bajnokság I
- 2018–19 Nemzeti Bajnokság II
- 2018–19 Nemzeti Bajnokság III
