= 2019–20 Nemzeti Bajnokság III =

Hungarian football league season

Nemzeti Bajnokság III
- Season: 2019–20
- Champions: Pécs (Centre); DEAC (East)
- Promoted: III. Kerületi TVE; Pécs; DEAC
- Relegated: Hévíz (West); Balatonlelle (West); Dunaharaszti (Centre); Kelen (Centre); Hatvan (East); Ózd (East)
- All statistics correct as of 16 July 2019.

The 2019–20 Nemzeti Bajnokság III is Hungary's third-level football competition. The championship was suspended due to the COVID-19 pandemic. The winners of the season were Érdi VSE, Pécsi MFC and Debreceni EAC. Pecs and Debreceni EAC were promoted. However, Érd could not meet the requirements of the Nemzeti Bajnokság II. Therefore, the second team, III. Kerületi TVE, were promoted.

On 11 July 2018, the three groups of the new season was finalised.

On 4 May 2020 season was suspended due to the COVID-19 pandemic.

== Teams ==
=== Changes ===
Zone	Promoted from 2018–19 MB I	Relegated from 2018–19 NB II
West	Bicske, Balatonlelle, Liót, Veszprém	Cegléd
Centre	Kelen	Mosonmagyaróvár
East		Monor
Zone	Promoted to 2019–20 NB II	Relegated to 2019–20 MB I
West	Ajka	Pénzügyőr, Csepel, Andráshida
Centre	Szeged 2011	Hódmezővásárhely, Makó, Paks II
East	Szolnok	Salgótarján, Cigánd, Sajóbábony

== Standings ==
=== West ===
Pos	Team	Pld	W	D	L	GF	GA	GD	Pts	Promotion or relegation
1	Érd	14	10	3	1	31	10	+21	33	
2	III. Kerület	14	10	2	2	34	14	+20	32	
3	Lipót	14	9	2	3	22	11	+11	29	
4	Nagykanizsa	14	8	2	4	23	18	+5	26	
5	Ménfőcsanak	14	6	5	3	16	13	+3	23	
6	Pápa	14	6	4	4	20	19	+1	22	
7	Veszprém	14	5	5	4	17	11	+6	20	
8	Mosonmagyaróvár	14	5	3	6	21	22	−1	18	
9	Bicske	14	4	5	5	16	19	−3	17	
10	BKV Előre	14	4	5	5	14	17	−3	17	
11	Puskás Akadémia II	14	5	1	8	23	22	+1	16	
12	Komárom	14	4	4	6	22	20	+2	16	
13	Sárvár	14	3	5	6	11	17	−6	14	Relegation to 2020–21 Megyei Bajnokság I
14	Balatonlelle	14	2	3	9	8	33	−25	9	Relegation to 2020–21 Megyei Bajnokság I
15	Fehérvár II	14	1	6	7	7	20	−13	9	
16	Hévíz	14	1	3	10	14	33	−19	6	Relegation to 2020–21 Megyei Bajnokság I

Updated to match(es) played on 10 November 2019. Source:
Rules for classification: 1st points; 2nd overall wins; 3rd goal difference; 4th head-to-head points; 5th head-to-head goal difference; 6th head-to-head away goals scored; 7th fair-play points; 8th drawing of lots

=== Centre ===
Pos	Team	Pld	W	D	L	GF	GA	GD	Pts	Promotion or relegation
1	Pécs (P)	19	15	3	1	65	9	+56	48	Promotion to 2020–21 Nemzeti Bajnokság II
2	Szentlőrinc	19	13	5	1	30	10	+20	44	Promotion to 2020–21 Nemzeti Bajnokság II
3	Monor	19	11	5	3	32	14	+18	38	
4	Iváncsa	19	10	5	4	31	18	+13	35	
5	Dunaújváros	19	9	4	6	27	26	+1	31	
6	Kozármisleny	19	8	7	4	31	25	+6	31	
7	Rákosmente	19	7	4	8	29	30	−1	25	
8	Dabas	19	7	4	8	13	18	−5	25	
9	Dabas–Gyón	19	7	4	8	20	28	−8	25	
10	Budapest Honvéd FC II	19	6	6	7	33	28	+5	24	
11	Kecskemét	19	5	5	9	24	26	−2	20	
12	Szekszárd	19	4	7	8	22	34	−12	19	
13	Taksony	19	5	3	11	17	30	−13	18	
14	Szabadkikötő	19	4	3	12	20	54	−34	15	
15	Dunaharaszti	19	2	5	12	12	37	−25	11	Relegation to 2020–21 Megyei Bajnokság I
16	Kelen	19	2	4	13	20	39	−19	10	Relegation to 2020–21 Megyei Bajnokság I

Updated to match(es) played on 14 March 2020. Source:
Rules for classification: 1st points; 2nd overall wins; 3rd goal difference; 4th head-to-head points; 5th head-to-head goal difference; 6th head-to-head away goals scored; 7th fair-play points; 8th drawing of lots
(P) Promoted

=== East ===
Pos	Team	Pld	W	D	L	GF	GA	GD	Pts	Promotion or relegation
1	Debreceni EAC	18	13	2	3	49	20	+29	41	Promotion to 2020–21 Nemzeti Bajnokság II
2	Füzesgyarmat	19	13	2	4	32	18	+14	41	
3	Cegléd	18	11	3	4	36	24	+12	36	
4	Sényő	17	9	5	3	37	28	+9	32	
5	ESMTK	18	8	7	3	29	20	+9	31	
6	Jászberény	18	7	8	3	37	31	+6	29	
7	Tiszaújváros	18	8	2	8	30	27	+3	26	
8	Putnok	14	5	4	5	20	16	+4	19	
9	Eger	14	5	1	8	15	25	−10	16	
10	Balassagyarmat	14	4	4	6	23	25	−2	16	
11	Debreceni VSC II	14	4	3	7	27	27	0	15	
12	Tállya	14	4	3	7	15	16	−1	15	
13	Gyöngyös	14	4	3	7	21	28	−7	15	
14	Hatvan	14	3	2	9	18	31	−13	11	
15	Ózd	14	1	8	5	9	25	−16	11	Relegation to 2020–21 Megyei Bajnokság I
16	Diósgyőr II	14	2	2	10	11	32	−21	8	

Updated to match(es) played on 10 November 2019. Source:
Rules for classification: 1st points; 2nd overall wins; 3rd goal difference; 4th head-to-head points; 5th head-to-head goal difference; 6th head-to-head away goals scored; 7th fair-play points; 8th drawing of lots

== Season statistics ==
=== Top goalscorers - West ===
Rank	Player	Club	Goals
1			20
2			15
3			13

Updated to games played on 3 June 2018

== See also ==
- 2019–20 Magyar Kupa
- 2019–20 Megyei Bajnokság I
- 2019–20 Nemzeti Bajnokság II
- 2019–20 Nemzeti Bajnokság I
