= 2019 Magyar Kupa final =

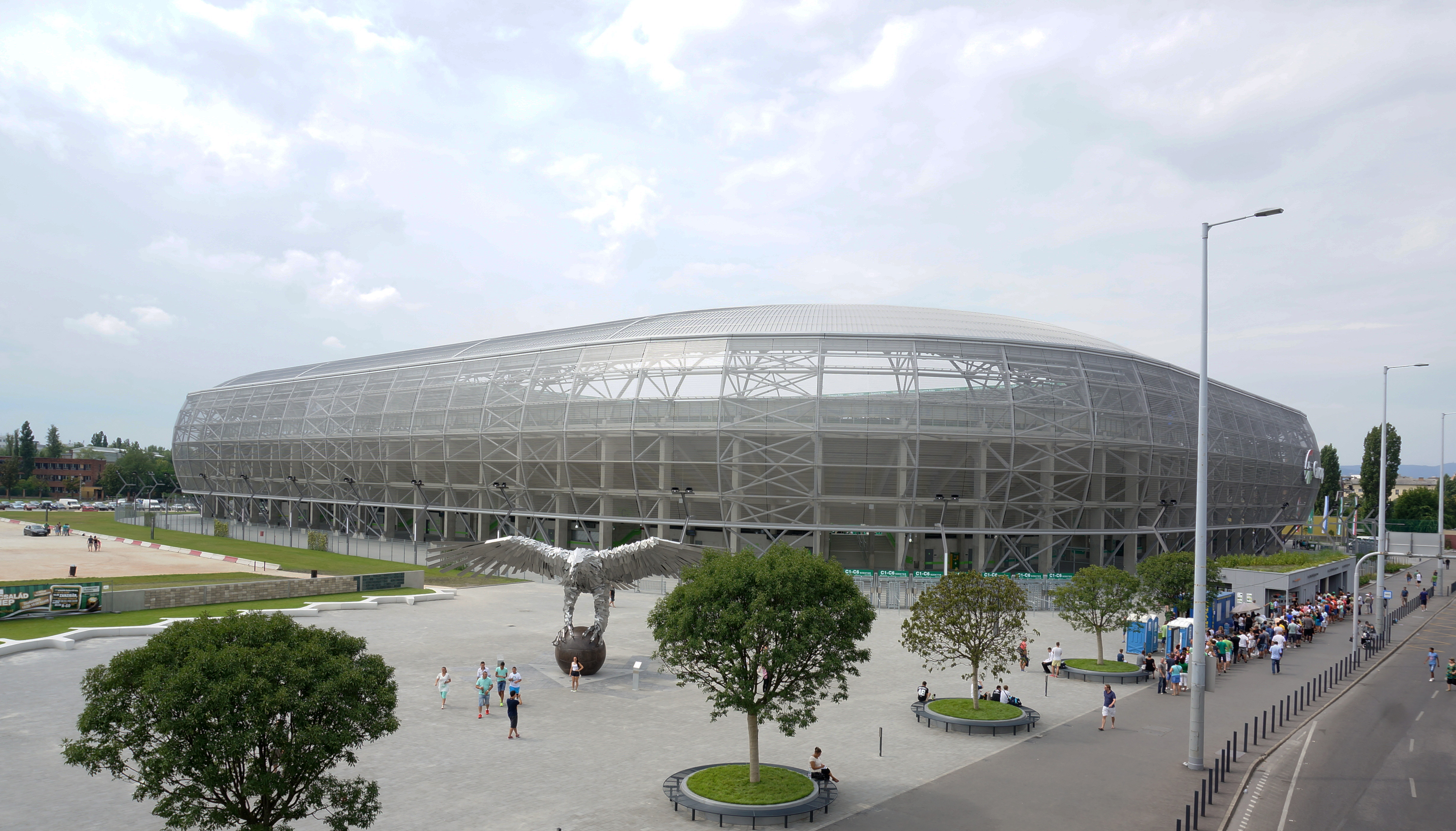
- Groupama Arena hosted the final
- Event: 2018–19 Magyar Kupa
Honvéd	Vidi
1	2
- Date: 25 May 2019
- Venue: Groupama Arena, Budapest
- Referee: Zoltán Iványi
- Attendance: 12,777

The 2019 Magyar Kupa final was the final match of the 2018–19 Magyar Kupa, played between Honvéd and Vidi on 25 May 2019 at the Groupama Arena in Budapest, Hungary.

== Teams ==
Team	Previous finals appearances (bold indicates winners)
Honvéd	16 (**1926**, 1955, **1964**, 1968, 1969, 1973, 1983, **1985**, 1988, **1989**, 1994, **1996**, 2004, **2007**, 2008, **2009**)
Vidi	5 (1982, 2001, **2006**, 2011, 2015)

== Route to the final ==
Note: In all results below, the score of the finalist is given first (H: home; A: away).

Honvéd			Round	Vidi		
Opponent	Result	Legs		Opponent	Result	Legs
Bőny (MB I)	6–0 (A)		Round of 128	Cigánd (NB III)	2–0 (A)	
Jászberény (NB III)	1–0 (A)		Round of 64	Vác (NB II)	3–1 (A)	
Tiszaújváros (NB III)	4–0 (A)		Round of 32	Budafok (NB II)	2–1 (A)	
Tiszakécske (NB II)	2–1	1–0 (A); 1–1 (H)	Round of 16	Taksony (NB III)	4–0	1–0 (A); 3–0 (H)
Budaörs (NB II)	6–3	2–1 (A); 4–2 (H)	Quarterfinals	Ferencváros (NB I)	4–1	2–1 (A); 2–0 (H)
Soroksár (NB II)	5–1	2–1 (H); 3–0 (A)	Semifinals	Debrecen (NB I)	4–0	1–0 (H); 3–0 (A)

== Match ==
25 May 2019
19:30 CEST

Honvéd	1–2	Vidi
Holender 14' (pen.)	Report	Šćepović 79'; Hadžić 90+1'

Groupama Arena, Budapest
Attendance: 12,777
Referee: Zoltán Iványi

**Honvéd**	**Vidi**

GK	99	(Hungary) Dávid Gróf (yellow card) 62'
DF	25	(Croatia) Ivan Lovrić (yellow card) 53'
DF	24	(Bosnia and Herzegovina) Đorđe Kamber
DF	7	(Hungary) Bence Batik (yellow card) 57'
MF	3	(Nigeria) Eke Uzoma (substituted off) 80'
MF	13	(Hungary) Tibor Heffler
MF	77	(Hungary) Gergő Nagy (yellow card) 32'
MF	6	(Hungary) Dániel Gazdag (substituted off) 69'
MF	2	(Belgium) Mohamed Mezghrani
FW	89	(France) David Ngog (substituted off) 76'
FW	11	(Hungary) Filip Holender
Substitutes:
GK	66	(Hungary) Attila Berla
DF	4	(Hungary) Dávid Kálnoki-Kis
MF	17	(Tunisia) Änis Ben-Hatira (substituted on) 69'
MF	33	(Croatia) Tonći Kukoč (substituted on) 80' (yellow card) 90+3'
MF	23	(Hungary) Bence Banó-Szabó
FW	19	(Brazil) Danilo (substituted on) 76'
FW	22	(Hungary) Milán Májer
Manager:
(Hungary) Attila Supka

GK	74	(Hungary) Ádám Kovácsik
DF	23	(Hungary) Roland Juhász
DF	5	(Hungary) Attila Fiola (substituted off) 46'
DF	11	(France) Loïc Négo
DF	3	(Hungary) Paulo Vinícius (yellow card) 13'
DF	22	(Cape Verde) Stopira (yellow card) 28'
MF	9	(Hungary) Szabolcs Huszti
MF	17	(Hungary) Máté Pátkai (substituted off) 73'
MF	6	(Hungary) Ákos Elek (yellow card) 35' (substituted off) 46'
MF	19	(North Macedonia) Boban Nikolov (yellow card) 56'
FW	44	(Serbia) Marko Šćepović (yellow card) 38'
Substitutes:
GK	12	(Slovakia) Tomáš Tujvel
DF	25	(Hungary) Krisztián Tamás
MF	8	(Bosnia and Herzegovina) Anel Hadžić (substituted on) 46' (yellow card) 90+1'
MF	10	(Hungary) István Kovács (substituted on) 46' (yellow card) 90+4'
MF	77	(Bulgaria) Georgi Milanov
FW	18	(Hungary) Márkó Futács (substituted on) 73'
FW	15	(Bosnia and Herzegovina) Armin Hodžić
Manager:
(Serbia) Marko Nikolić
