= 2016–17 Nemzeti Bajnokság II =

Nemzeti Bajnokság II
- Season: 2016–17
- Country: Hungary
- Champions: Puskás Akadémia
- Promoted: Puskás Akadémia; Balmazújváros
- Relegated: Kozármisleny; Cigánd; Szegedi EOL
- Top goalscorer: Balázs Lovrencsics (22 goals)

The 2016–17 Nemzeti Bajnokság II was Hungary's second-level football competition. The season was won by Puskás Akadémia FC, while Balmazújvárosi FC finished second by beating Kisvárda FC on the last day of the match day by 1–0 on 4 June 2017. This season was played with 20 teams after increase from 16 in 2015–16.

== Teams ==
At the end of 2015-16 season, Gyirmót and Mezőkövesd promoted to Nemzeti Bajnokság I.

Three teams were relegated to Nemzeti Bajnokság III : Szigetszentmiklós, Dunaújváros and Ajka.

The winners of the three 2015–16 Nemzeti Bajnokság III series were promoted to NB II: Nyíregyháza, Kozármisleny and Mosonmagyaróvár.

=== Stadium and locations ===
Location of teams in 2015-16 Nemzeti Bajnokság II

Following is the list of clubs competing in 2015–16 Nemzeti Bajnokság II, with their location, stadium and stadium capacity.

Team	Location	Stadium	Capacity
Balmazújváros	Balmazújváros	Batthyány utcai Sportpálya	2,300
Békéscsaba	Békéscsaba	Kórház utcai Stadion	13,000
Budaörs	Budaörs	Árok utcai pálya	1,200
Cegléd	Cegléd	Malomtószéli Stadion	4,000
Cigánd	Cigánd	Cigándi Sportpálya	2,000
Csákvár	Csákvár	Tersztyánszky Ödön Sportközpont	2,020
Dorog	Dorog	Buzánszky Jenő Stadion	5,000
Kisvárda	Kisvárda	Várkert Sportpálya	2,124
Kozármisleny	Kozármisleny	Alkotmány tér stadion	1,500
Mosonmagyaróvár	Mosonmagyaróvár	Wittmann Antal park	4,000
Nyíregyháza	Nyíregyháza	Városi Stadion	10,500
Puskás	Felcsút	Pancho Arena	3,816
Siófok	Siófok	Révész Géza utcai Stadion	6,500
Sopron	Sopron	Stadion Városi	4,500
Soroksár	Budapest	Szamosi Mihály Sporttelep	5,000
Szeged	Gyula	Grosics Akadémia Centerpálya	1,500
SZEOL	Szeged	Szegedi VSE Stadion	5,000
Szolnok	Szolnok	Tiszaligeti Stadion	4,000
Vác	Vác	Ligeti Stadion	12,000
Zalaegerszeg	Zalaegerszeg	ZTE Arena	9,300

=== Personnel and kits ===
Following is the list of clubs competing in 2016–17 Nemzeti Bajnokság II, with their manager, captain, kit manufacturer and shirt sponsor.

Team	Manager	Captain	Kit manufacturer	Shirt sponsor
Balmazújváros	(Hungary) Tamás Feczkó	(Hungary) László Kiss	Adidas	Kamilla Gyógyfürdő
Békéscsaba	(Serbia) Zoran Spisljak	(Hungary) Zsolt Balog	Adidas	Békés Drén
Budaörs	(Hungary) Attila Miskei	(Hungary) Ádám Csobánki	Ziccer	Volkswagen
Cegléd	(Hungary) Attila Varga	(Hungary) Viktor Farkas	Joma	
Cigánd	(Hungary) Péter Szénay	(Hungary) Zoltán Baksa	Joma	Girdán Fa kft.
Csákvár	(Hungary) Gábor Toldi	(Hungary) Tamás Szalai	adidas	Aqvital
Dorog	(Hungary) Szabolcs Németh	(Hungary) Illés Sitku	Adidas	Pannon Falap-Lemez
Kisvárda	(Hungary) Attila Révész	(Hungary) Gábor Erős	Adidas	Master Good
Kozármisleny	(Hungary) Zsolt Németh	(Hungary) Levente Lantos	Givova	HR-Rent
Mosonmagyaróvár	(Hungary) József Király	(Hungary) Balázs Laki	Legea	Credobus
Nyíregyháza	(Hungary) János Mátyus	(Hungary) Tamás Törtei	Jako	Révész
Puskás	(Hungary) István Szijjártó	(Hungary) Attila Polonkai	Jako	Mészáros & Mészáros kft.
Siófok	(Serbia) Goran Kopunović	(Hungary) Jószef Mogyorósi	Nike	HunGast
Sopron	(Hungary) Attila Supka	(Hungary) Tamás Sifter	Nike	Swietelsky
Soroksár	(Hungary) Tamás Lucsánszky	(Hungary) Gábor Gyepes	Jako	Banetti
Szeged	(Hungary) László Klausz	(Hungary) Levente Szántai	Lotto	Rádio 88
SZEOL	(Hungary) Gábor Buhholcz	(Hungary) Csaba Puskás	Legea	Suli-Host
Szolnok	(Hungary) Gábor Antal	(Hungary) Csaba Somogyi	hummel	Szolnok
Vác	(Hungary) Tibor Nagy	(Hungary)	Joma	
Zalaegerszeg	(Hungary) János Csank	(Hungary) Gábor Simonfalvi	mass	Pharos

== League table ==
Pos	Team	Pld	W	D	L	GF	GA	GD	Pts	Promotion or relegation
1	Puskás Akadémia (P)	38	22	11	5	67	39	+28	77	Promotion to Nemzeti Bajnokság I
2	Balmazújváros (P)	38	22	7	9	49	34	+15	73	Promotion to Nemzeti Bajnokság I
3	Kisvárda	38	20	9	9	55	30	+25	69	
4	Soroksár	38	19	10	9	63	40	+23	67	
5	Békéscsaba	38	19	8	11	55	34	+21	65	
6	Vác	38	16	11	11	45	38	+7	59	
7	Zalaegerszeg	38	14	13	11	56	49	+7	55	
8	Dorog	38	15	9	14	46	35	+11	54	
9	Mosonmagyaróvár	38	14	12	12	48	40	+8	54	
10	Szolnok	38	14	10	14	49	50	−1	52	
11	Szeged	38	12	15	11	39	29	+10	51	
12	Nyíregyháza	38	14	8	16	48	50	−2	50	
13	Sopron	38	11	16	11	37	38	−1	49	
14	Siófok	38	13	9	16	43	51	−8	48	
15	Budaörs	38	13	8	17	48	56	−8	47	
16	Csákvár	38	8	16	14	44	57	−13	40	
17	Cegléd	38	10	9	19	42	55	−13	39	
18	Kozármisleny (R)	38	10	7	21	33	61	−28	37	Relegation to Nemzeti Bajnokság III
19	Cigánd (R)	38	7	11	20	27	64	−37	29 (Note: Cigánd deducted 3 point)	Relegation to Nemzeti Bajnokság III
20	SZEOL (R)	38	4	7	27	20	64	−44	19	Relegation to Nemzeti Bajnokság III

Source: (in Hungarian)
Rules for classification: 1st points; 2nd overall wins; 3rd goal difference; 4th head-to-head points; 5th head-to-head goal difference; 6th head-to-head away goals scored; 7th fair-play points; 8th drawing of lots
(P) Promoted; (R) Relegated

== Season statistics ==
=== Top goalscorers ===
Rank	Player	Club	Goals
1	(Hungary) Balázs Lovrencsics	Soroksár FC	22
2	(Hungary) Gergely Bobál	Zalaegerszegi TE	15
3	(Hungary) Balázs Laki	Mosonmagyaróvár	12
3	(Hungary) Márk Petneházi	BFC Siófok	12
3	(Hungary) László Tóth	Szolnok	12
3	(Hungary) Patrik Tischler	Puskás Akadémia FC	12
7	(Hungary) Patrik Paudits	Csákvár	11
7	(Hungary) László Lencse	Puskás Akadémia FC	11

Updated to games played on 5 June 2017

== Number of teams by counties ==
	County (megye)		No. teams	Teams
1		Pest	3	Budaörs, Cegléd, and Vác
2		Csongrád	2	Szeged 2011 and SZEOL
2		Fejér	2	Csákvár and Puskás
2		Győr-Moson-Sopron	2	Mosonmagyaróvár and Sopron
2	align=center	Szabolcs-Szatmár-Bereg	2	Kisvárda and Nyíregyháza
6		Baranya	1	Kozármisleny
6		Békés	1	Békéscsaba
6		Borsod-Abaúj-Zemplén	1	Cigánd
6		Budapest	1	Soroksár
6		Hajdú-Bihar	1	Balmazújváros
6		Jász-Nagykun-Szolnok	1	Szolnok
6		Komárom-Esztergom	1	Dorog
6		Somogy	1	Siófok
6		Zala	1	Zalaegerszeg

== See also ==
- 2016–17 Magyar Kupa
- 2017 Magyar Kupa Final
- 2016–17 Nemzeti Bajnokság I
- 2016–17 Nemzeti Bajnokság III
