= Ostrov orliaka morského (nature reserve) =

Nature Reserve

Coordinates: 47.87579°N 17.49955°E

- IUCN category Ia (strict nature reserve)
- Interactive map of Ostrov orliaka morského
- Area: 0.2277 km^{2} (0.0879 sq mi)
- Established: 1953
- Governing body: ŠOP - S-CHKO Dunajské luhy

Ostrov orliaka morského is a national nature reserve in the Slovak municipality of Baka in the Dunajská Streda District. The nature reserve covers an area of 22.77 ha of the Danube floodplain area. It has a protection level of 5 under the Slovak nature protection system. The nature reserve is part of the Dunajské luhy Protected Landscape Area.

== Description ==
The protected area forms one of the last remnants of regularly flooded, natural floodplains along the Danube. The habitats present in the reserve represent some rare and endangered species of flora and fauna.

== Fauna ==
The Ostrov orliaka morského nature reserve is located on an island with the same name, referring to the white-tailed eagle. This bird species nested here irregularly until 1964 with only 9 successful nesting cases between 1946 and 1964. Other species of birds living in the nature reserve include the great cormorant, the black kite, the purple heron, the grey heron and the little egret.
