= Marcell Strebek =

Hungarian footballer and manager

Personal information
- Date of birth: 31 July 1975 (age 51)
- Place of birth: Budapest, Hungary

Team information
- Current team: THSE Sashalom (Manager)

Managerial career
- Years: Team
- 2017–: THSE Sashalom

Marcell Strebek (born 31 July 1975) is a Hungarian football manager who manages THSE Sashalom.

== Career ==
In an interview with Pesti Foci, Strebek said that he hoped that his team would prosper in the second half of the 2016–17 BLASZ season. Strebek's team won two consecutive matches in the 2017–18 Nemzeti Bajnokság III season with THSE Sashalom.

== Sources ==
- THSE Sashalom official website (in Hungarian)
