= 2018–19 Nemzeti Bajnokság III =

Nemzeti Bajnokság III
- Season: 2018–19
- Champions: Ajka (West); Szeged 2011 (Centre); Szolnok (East)
- Promoted: Ajka; Szeged 2011; Szolnok
- Relegated: Andráshida (West); Cigánd (East); Csepel (West); Hódmezővásárhely (Centre); Makó (Centre); Paks II (Centre); Pénzügyőr (West); Sajóbábony (East); Salgótarján (East)
- All statistics correct as of 20 August 2018.

The 2018–19 Nemzeti Bajnokság III is Hungary's third-level football competition.

On 11 July 2018, the three groups of the new season was finalised.

== Teams ==
=== Changes ===
Zone	Promoted from 2017–18 MB I	Relegated from 2017–18 NB II
West	Komárom, Ménfőcsanak, Nagykanizsa, Sárvár	Szolnok
Centre	Kecskemét, Taksony	Szeged 2011
East	Eger, Sényő, Sajóbábony, Salgótarján	Sopron
Zone	Promoted to 2018–19 NB II	Relegated to 2018–19 MB I
West	Kaposvár	Veszprém, Csorna, Gyirmót II
Centre	Tiszakécske	Mórahalom, Vecsés
East	Monor	Tiszafüred, Balassagyarmat

== Standings ==
=== West ===
Pos	Team	Pld	W	D	L	GF	GA	GD	Pts	Promotion or relegation
1	Ajka (P)	30	22	5	3	85	20	+65	71	Promotion to 2019–20 Nemzeti Bajnokság II
2	Érd	30	17	8	5	59	40	+19	59	
3	Puskás Akadémia II	30	13	11	6	53	40	+13	50	
4	Komárom	30	15	4	11	51	42	+9	49	
5	III. Kerület	30	13	10	7	49	46	+3	49	
6	Nagykanizsa	30	12	7	11	45	40	+5	43	
7	Ménfőcsanak	30	11	8	11	45	47	−2	41	
8	Pápa	30	9	13	8	50	46	+4	40	
9	BKV Előre	30	9	11	10	49	56	−7	38	
10	THSE Szabadkikötő	30	9	6	15	41	60	−19	33	
11	Dunaharaszti	30	8	8	14	36	56	−20	32	
12	Sárvár	30	7	11	12	26	33	−7	32	
13	MOL Vidi II	30	8	7	15	42	49	−7	31	Qualification for Relegation play-offs
14	Pénzügyőr (R)	30	8	7	15	39	50	−11	31	Relegation to 2019–20 Megyei Bajnokság I
15	Csepel (R)	30	8	6	16	26	54	−28	30	Relegation to 2019–20 Megyei Bajnokság I
16	Zalaegerszeg-Anráshida (R)	30	7	6	17	29	46	−17	27	Relegation to 2019–20 Megyei Bajnokság I

Source: soccerway.com
Rules for classification: 1st points; 2nd overall wins; 3rd goal difference; 4th head-to-head points; 5th head-to-head goal difference; 6th head-to-head away goals scored; 7th fair-play points; 8th drawing of lots
(P) Promoted; (R) Relegated

=== Centre ===
Pos	Team	Pld	W	D	L	GF	GA	GD	Pts	Promotion or relegation
1	Szeged 2011	30	21	5	4	52	17	+35	68	Promotion to 2019–20 Nemzeti Bajnokság II
2	Szentlőrinc	30	19	6	5	53	21	+32	63	
3	SZEOL	30	16	7	7	40	20	+20	55	
4	Dunaújváros	30	13	10	7	34	19	+15	49	
5	Budapest Honvéd II	30	12	7	11	34	40	−6	43	
6	Rákosmente	30	11	8	11	33	37	−4	41	
7	Iváncsa	30	10	9	11	46	44	+2	39	
8	Dabas	30	10	9	11	37	38	−1	39	
9	Kecskemét	30	9	12	9	36	35	+1	39	
10	Kozármisleny	30	9	11	10	33	29	+4	38	
11	Pécs	30	9	11	10	32	34	−2	38	
12	Taksony	30	10	6	14	35	44	−9	36	
13	Szekszárd	30	8	10	12	24	29	−5	34	Qualification for Relegation play-offs
14	Hódmezővásárhely	30	7	5	18	25	58	−33	26	Relegation to 2019–20 Megyei Bajnokság I
15	Paks II	30	5	11	14	27	44	−17	26	Relegation to 2019–20 Megyei Bajnokság I
16	Makó	30	5	5	20	25	57	−32	20	Relegation to 2019–20 Megyei Bajnokság I

Updated to match(es) played on 2 June 2019. Source: soccerway.com
Rules for classification: 1st points; 2nd overall wins; 3rd goal difference; 4th head-to-head points; 5th head-to-head goal difference; 6th head-to-head away goals scored; 7th fair-play points; 8th drawing of lots

=== East ===
Pos	Team	Pld	W	D	L	GF	GA	GD	Pts	Promotion or relegation
1	Szolnok	30	20	5	5	61	31	+30	65	Promotion to 2019–20 Nemzeti Bajnokság II
2	Jászberény	30	21	1	8	75	31	+44	64	
3	ESMTK	30	18	6	6	50	28	+22	60	
4	Füzesgyarmat	30	17	4	9	65	32	+33	55	
5	Putnok	30	15	4	11	49	50	−1	49	
6	Sényő	30	14	7	9	56	46	+10	49	
7	Tiszaújváros	30	14	6	10	54	34	+20	48	
8	Nyírbátor	30	13	7	10	39	39	0	46	
9	DEAC	30	13	5	12	57	58	−1	44	
10	Eger	30	10	6	14	33	43	−10	36	
11	Diósgyőr II	30	9	3	18	36	59	−23	30	
12	Gyöngyös	30	8	6	16	40	52	−12	30	
13	Tállya	30	8	5	17	27	47	−20	29	Qualification for Relegation play-offs
14	Salgótarján	30	8	5	17	33	60	−27	29	Relegation to 2019–20 Megyei Bajnokság I
15	Cigánd	30	6	4	20	30	58	−28	22	Relegation to 2019–20 Megyei Bajnokság I
16	Sajóbábony	30	7	4	19	33	67	−34	21 (Note: 4 points deducted)	Relegation to 2019–20 Megyei Bajnokság I

Updated to match(es) played on 2 June 2019. Source: soccerway.com
Rules for classification: 1st points; 2nd overall wins; 3rd goal difference; 4th head-to-head points; 5th head-to-head goal difference; 6th head-to-head away goals scored; 7th fair-play points; 8th drawing of lots

== Season statistics ==
=== Top goalscorers - West ===
Rank	Player	Club	Goals
1	(Hungary) Krisztián Nagy	Ajka	23
2	(Hungary) Bence Balogh	BKV Előre	21
3	(Hungary) Dávid Oláh	Ajka	19

Updated to games played on 2 June 2019

=== Top goalscorers - Centre ===
Rank	Player	Club	Goals
1	(Hungary) László Balogh	Iváncsa	18
2	(Hungary) János Máté	Szeged	15
3	(Hungary) Milán Májer (Serbia) Luka Šili	Budapest Honvéd II; Szentlőrinc	13

Updated to games played on 2 June 2019

=== Top goalscorers - East ===
Rank	Player	Club	Goals
1	(Hungary) Attila Simon	Szolnok	27
2	(Hungary) János Farkas	Jászberény	23
3	(Hungary) Krisztián Kerekes	DEAC	19

Updated to games played on 2 June 2019

== See also ==
- 2018–19 Magyar Kupa
- 2018–19 Megyei Bajnokság I
- 2018–19 Nemzeti Bajnokság II
- 2018–19 Nemzeti Bajnokság I
