= Abbey of San Basilide =

Vallombrosan monastery and church in the Province of Parma, Italy

Coordinates: 44.5928°N 10.2678°E

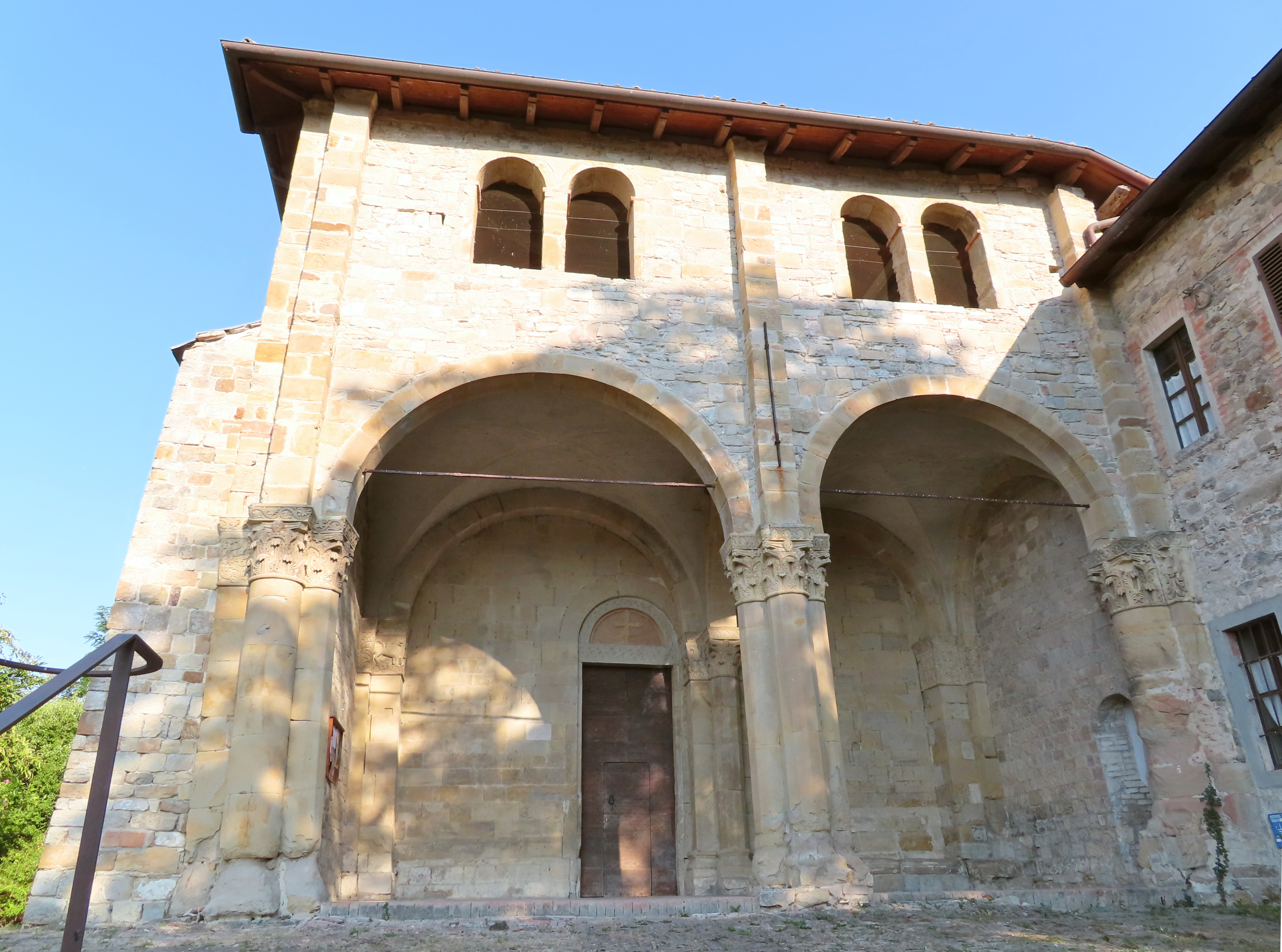
Facade with sculpted column capitals

The Abbey of San Basilide (Italian: Abbazia di San Basilide, also known as Badia Cavana, is a former Vallombrosan monastery and church located in the neighborhood of San Michele Cavana of the town of Lesignano de' Bagni, Province of Parma, region of Emilia-Romagna, Italy.

== History ==
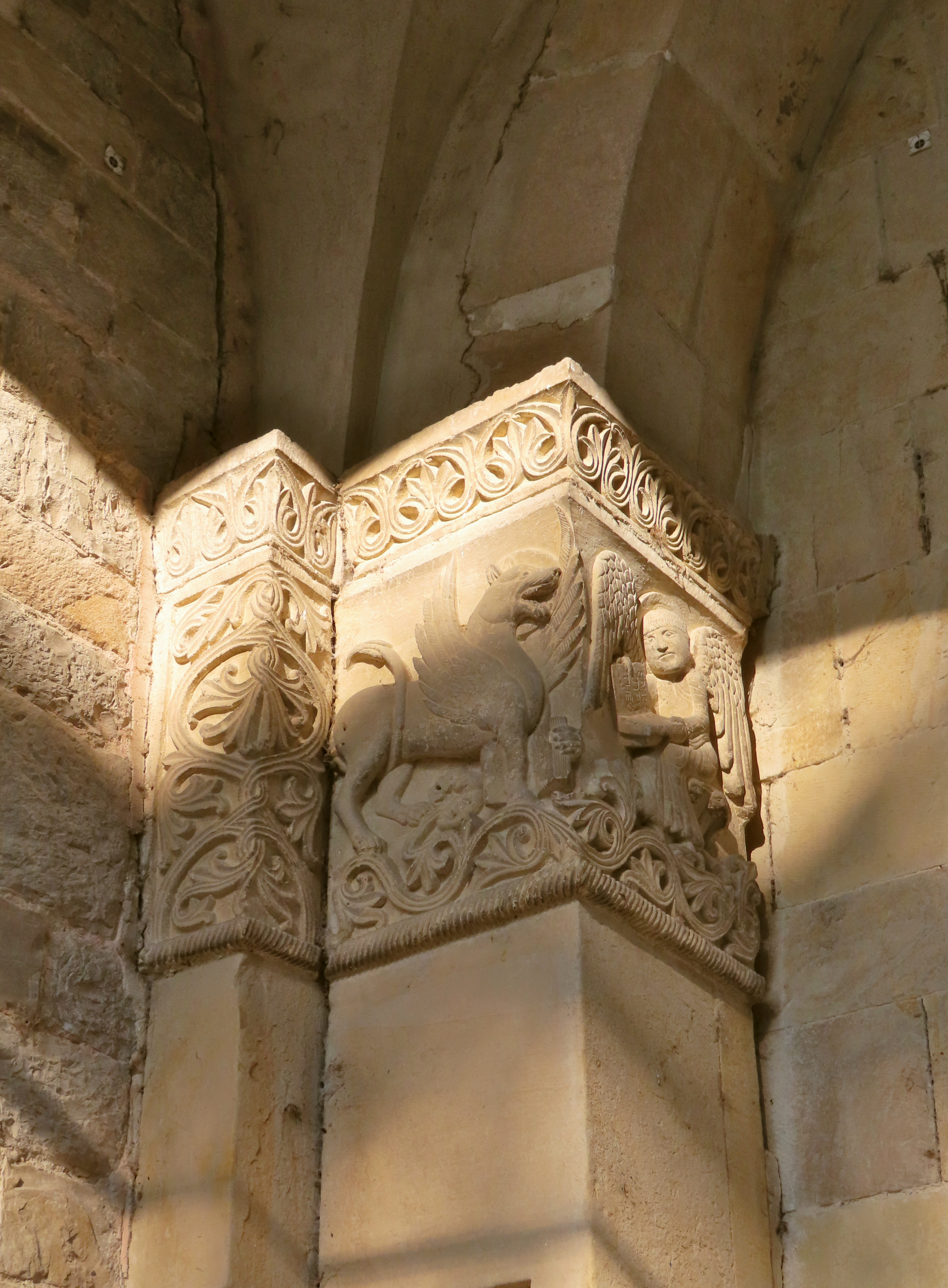
Sculpted Romanesque capitals

The abbey stands along a road from Tuscany to Parma, through the Lagastrello pass across the Apennines. It was founded between 1097 and 1106 by the Benedictine congregation of Vallombrosa, the ruled by this order until 1485. The stone abbey buildings retains their original Romanesque layouts.

The abbey church has a semicircular apse. In the twelfth century, a portico with two arches and an upper loggia, with capitals depicting the symbols of the evangelists, was added. At the apse are stairs descending to a crypt which putatively held the remains of St Basilide. On the southern side of the church are portions of a still functioning monastery.

The foundation of the abbey is linked to the figure of Bernardo degli Uberti, abbot of Vallombrosa, cardinal and apostolic legate of Pope Pasquale II, appointed as bishop of Parma in 1106.
