= Valér Kapacina =

Hungarian footballer

Personal information
- Full name: Valér Kapacina
- Date of birth: 14 July 1993 (age 33)
- Place of birth: Nyíregyháza, Hungary
- Height: 1.83 m (6 ft 0 in)
- Position: Midfielder

Team information
- Current team: Sényő

Youth career
- 2002–2004: Sényő
- 2004–2006: Nyíregyháza

Senior career*
Years	Team	Apps	(Gls)
2006–2009	Sényő	13	(0)
2009–2016	Honvéd	6	(1)
2010–2013	Honvéd II	33	(6)
2013–2014	→ Kisvárda (loan)	7	(0)
2015	→ Soproni VSE (loan)	14	(2)
2015–2016	→ Soroksár SC (loan)	14	(0)
2016–2017	Soproni VSE	42	(5)
2017–2019	Mosonmagyaróvári TE	43	(0)
2019–	Sényő		
- * Club domestic league appearances and goals as of 23:38, 20 May 2019 (UTC)

Valér Kapacina (born 14 July 1993 in Nyíregyháza) is a Hungarian football player who currently plays for Sényő FC.

== Club career ==
He made his debut for Budapest Honvéd of 19 March 2011 against Szolnoki MÁV FC in a match that ended 0–0.

In February 2019, Kapacina joined Sényő FC.
