= 1994–95 Nemzeti Bajnokság III =

Nemzeti Bajnokság III
- Season: 1994–95
- Champions: Kecskeméti TE (Alföld); Balatonfüredi SC (Bakony); Rákóczi-Kaposcukor FC (Dráva); Érdi VSE (Duna); FC Eger (Mátra); FC Sényő (Tisza)
- Promoted: Kecskeméti TE (Alföld); Kecskeméti SC-RSC (Alföld); Balatonfüredi SC (Bakony); Rákóczi-Kaposcukor FC (Dráva); Érdi VSE (Duna); FC Eger (Mátra); FC Sényő (Tisza)

The 1994–95 Nemzeti Bajnokság III season was the 14th edition of the Nemzeti Bajnokság III.

== League tables ==
=== Alföld group ===
| Pos | Team | Pld | W | D | L | GF | GA | GD | Pts | Promotion or relegation |
|---|---|---|---|---|---|---|---|---|---|---|
| 1 | Kecskeméti TE | 30 | 20 | 6 | 4 | 82 | 21 | +61 | 66 | Promotion to Nemzeti Bajnokság II |
| 2 | Kiskőrös FC | 30 | 16 | 8 | 6 | 61 | 26 | +35 | 56 | |
| 3 | Gyula FC | 30 | 15 | 7 | 8 | 39 | 29 | +10 | 52 | |
| 4 | Szegedi VSE | 30 | 15 | 6 | 9 | 50 | 29 | +21 | 51 | |
| 5 | Makó FC | 30 | 15 | 4 | 11 | 54 | 32 | +22 | 49 | |
| 6 | Kalocsai FC | 30 | 15 | 6 | 9 | 58 | 36 | +22 | 48 (Note: 3 points deducted) | |
| 7 | Kiskunfélegyházi TK | 30 | 12 | 12 | 6 | 44 | 30 | +14 | 48 | |
| 8 | Kecskeméti SC-RSC | 30 | 13 | 8 | 9 | 54 | 37 | +17 | 47 | Promotion to Nemzeti Bajnokság II |
| 9 | Szeged FC | 30 | 14 | 4 | 12 | 50 | 42 | +8 | 46 | |
| 10 | Kiskundorozsmai ESK | 30 | 13 | 5 | 12 | 52 | 53 | −1 | 44 | |
| 11 | Szentes FC | 30 | 10 | 6 | 14 | 19 | 30 | −11 | 33 (Note: 3 points deducted) | |
| 12 | Ceglédi Kossuth Honvéd SE | 30 | 8 | 8 | 14 | 36 | 48 | −12 | 32 | |
| 13 | Mezőberény FC | 30 | 8 | 8 | 14 | 28 | 68 | −40 | 32 | |
| 14 | Orosházi MTK | 30 | 8 | 4 | 18 | 36 | 57 | −21 | 28 | Relegation to Megyei Bajnokság I |
| 15 | Békés FC | 30 | 6 | 6 | 18 | 34 | 72 | −38 | 24 | Relegation to Megyei Bajnokság I |
| 16 | Mezőkovácsháza TE | 30 | 2 | 2 | 26 | 13 | 100 | −87 | 8 | Relegation to Megyei Bajnokság I |

=== Bakony group ===
| Pos | Team | Pld | W | D | L | GF | GA | GD | Pts | Promotion or relegation |
|---|---|---|---|---|---|---|---|---|---|---|
| 1 | Balatonfüredi SC | 30 | 17 | 4 | 9 | 61 | 35 | +26 | 55 | Promotion to Nemzeti Bajnokság II |
| 2 | Csorna-Riegler SE | 30 | 16 | 6 | 8 | 57 | 35 | +22 | 54 | |
| 3 | Püspökmolnári KSK | 30 | 15 | 6 | 9 | 40 | 32 | +8 | 51 | Relegation to Megyei Bajnokság I |
| 4 | Petőházi Cukorgyár SE | 30 | 13 | 9 | 8 | 43 | 26 | +17 | 48 | |
| 5 | Tapolcai Bauxit Ifjúsági SE | 30 | 12 | 9 | 9 | 39 | 34 | +5 | 45 | |
| 6 | Linde SE Répcelak | 30 | 11 | 11 | 8 | 52 | 37 | +15 | 44 | |
| 7 | Betka-MÁV DAC | 30 | 11 | 11 | 8 | 39 | 33 | +6 | 44 | |
| 8 | MOTIM TE | 30 | 12 | 7 | 11 | 67 | 43 | +24 | 43 | |
| 9 | Szentgotthárdi MSE | 30 | 10 | 11 | 9 | 39 | 34 | +5 | 41 | |
| 10 | Babati Hús-Körmend FC | 30 | 10 | 9 | 11 | 33 | 51 | −18 | 39 | |
| 11 | Sárvári Kinizsi SE | 30 | 10 | 8 | 12 | 41 | 45 | −4 | 38 | |
| 12 | Hévíz SK | 30 | 10 | 7 | 13 | 36 | 39 | −3 | 37 | |
| 13 | Győri Dózsa Horváth Gumi SE 1 | 30 | 11 | 5 | 14 | 44 | 46 | −2 | 32 (Note: 6 points deducted) | |
| 14 | Herendi Porcelán SK | 30 | 9 | 5 | 16 | 45 | 50 | −5 | 32 | Relegation to Megyei Bajnokság I |
| 15 | Lenti Tempo TE | 30 | 7 | 7 | 16 | 30 | 70 | −40 | 28 | Relegation to Megyei Bajnokság I |
| 16 | MÁV Nagykanizsai TE | 30 | 6 | 5 | 19 | 21 | 77 | −56 | 23 | Relegation to Megyei Bajnokság I |

=== Dráva group ===
| Pos | Team | Pld | W | D | L | GF | GA | GD | Pts | Promotion or relegation |
|---|---|---|---|---|---|---|---|---|---|---|
| 1 | Rákóczi-Kaposcukor FC | 30 | 25 | 5 | 0 | 76 | 11 | +65 | 80 | Promotion to Nemzeti Bajnokság II |
| 2 | DD Gáz SC | 30 | 21 | 5 | 4 | 59 | 15 | +44 | 68 | |
| 3 | Komlói Bányász SK | 30 | 18 | 8 | 4 | 62 | 26 | +36 | 62 | |
| 4 | Marcali VSE | 30 | 15 | 9 | 6 | 60 | 46 | +14 | 54 | |
| 5 | Balatonföldvári SE | 30 | 13 | 10 | 7 | 48 | 33 | +15 | 49 | |
| 6 | Kisdorogi MEDOSZ SE | 30 | 11 | 9 | 10 | 38 | 39 | −1 | 42 | |
| 7 | Bonyhádi SE | 30 | 10 | 11 | 9 | 40 | 42 | −2 | 41 | |
| 8 | Sellye SE | 30 | 10 | 7 | 13 | 41 | 58 | −17 | 37 | |
| 9 | Bátaszéki Városi SE | 30 | 11 | 3 | 16 | 43 | 48 | −5 | 36 | |
| 10 | UFC Szekszárd | 30 | 9 | 6 | 15 | 42 | 49 | −7 | 33 | |
| 11 | Gerjeni MEDOSZ SE | 30 | 8 | 7 | 15 | 43 | 55 | −12 | 31 | |
| 12 | Balatonlellei SE | 30 | 8 | 9 | 13 | 39 | 57 | −18 | 30 (Note: 3 points deducted) | |
| 13 | Barcsi SC | 30 | 6 | 9 | 15 | 26 | 42 | −16 | 27 | Relegation to Megyei Bajnokság I |
| 14 | Nagyatádi VSE | 30 | 6 | 9 | 15 | 25 | 47 | −22 | 27 | Relegation to Megyei Bajnokság I |
| 15 | Letenye SE | 30 | 4 | 8 | 18 | 34 | 75 | −41 | 20 | Relegation to Megyei Bajnokság I |
| 16 | Bólyi SE | 30 | 4 | 7 | 19 | 19 | 52 | −33 | 19 | Relegation to Megyei Bajnokság I |

=== Duna group ===
| Pos | Team | Pld | W | D | L | GF | GA | GD | Pts | Promotion or relegation |
|---|---|---|---|---|---|---|---|---|---|---|
| 1 | Érdi VSE | 30 | 23 | 3 | 4 | 70 | 28 | +42 | 72 | Promotion to Nemzeti Bajnokság II |
| 2 | Pilisvörösvári SC | 30 | 23 | 3 | 4 | 72 | 32 | +40 | 72 | |
| 3 | Pénzügyőr SE | 30 | 18 | 4 | 8 | 54 | 29 | +25 | 58 | |
| 4 | Honvéd Szondi Velence SE | 30 | 16 | 3 | 11 | 58 | 45 | +13 | 51 | |
| 5 | Elektromos SE | 30 | 13 | 4 | 13 | 49 | 45 | +4 | 43 | |
| 6 | Bakonycsernyei Bányász SK | 30 | 12 | 7 | 11 | 38 | 47 | −9 | 43 | |
| 7 | Szigetszentmiklósi TK | 30 | 11 | 8 | 11 | 54 | 49 | +5 | 41 | |
| 8 | Bicskei TC | 30 | 10 | 10 | 10 | 47 | 47 | 0 | 40 | |
| 9 | Fradi Rádió Taxi FC | 30 | 11 | 5 | 14 | 46 | 42 | +4 | 38 | |
| 10 | Csákvár-Szentendre | 30 | 11 | 3 | 16 | 43 | 50 | −7 | 36 | |
| 11 | Kistarcsai Synergy SC | 30 | 9 | 8 | 13 | 36 | 58 | −22 | 35 | |
| 12 | UFC Tatabánya | 30 | 9 | 8 | 13 | 36 | 58 | −22 | 35 | |
| 13 | Dorogi Bányász SC | 30 | 10 | 4 | 16 | 33 | 40 | −7 | 34 | |
| 14 | Magyar Viscosa SE | 30 | 10 | 3 | 17 | 24 | 41 | −17 | 33 | Relegation to Megyei Bajnokság I |
| 15 | Rákosmenti TK | 30 | 9 | 4 | 17 | 41 | 62 | −21 | 31 | Relegation to Megyei Bajnokság I |
| 16 | Ercsi Kinizsi SK | 30 | 5 | 3 | 22 | 27 | 55 | −28 | 18 | Relegation to Megyei Bajnokság I |

=== Mátra group ===
| Pos | Team | Pld | W | D | L | GF | GA | GD | Pts | Promotion or relegation |
|---|---|---|---|---|---|---|---|---|---|---|
| 1 | FC Eger | 30 | 24 | 3 | 3 | 84 | 19 | +65 | 75 | Promotion to Nemzeti Bajnokság II |
| 2 | Dunakeszi VSE | 30 | 19 | 4 | 7 | 64 | 25 | +39 | 61 | |
| 3 | Rákospalotai EAC | 30 | 18 | 5 | 7 | 66 | 29 | +37 | 56 (Note: 3 points deducted?) | |
| 4 | Jászberényi SE | 30 | 16 | 8 | 6 | 44 | 27 | +17 | 56 | |
| 5 | Szolnoki MÁV MTE | 30 | 15 | 8 | 7 | 56 | 35 | +21 | 53 | |
| 6 | Multi-Rocco FC | 30 | 16 | 3 | 11 | 54 | 44 | +10 | 51 | |
| 7 | Gyöngyösi AK | 30 | 14 | 6 | 10 | 44 | 36 | +8 | 48 | |
| 8 | Monori SE | 30 | 14 | 4 | 12 | 60 | 43 | +17 | 46 | |
| 9 | Füzesabony SC | 30 | 12 | 7 | 11 | 36 | 34 | +2 | 43 | |
| 10 | Recski Ércbányász SE | 30 | 11 | 5 | 14 | 45 | 54 | −9 | 38 | |
| 11 | Szécsényi VSE | 30 | 10 | 7 | 13 | 43 | 46 | −3 | 37 | |
| 12 | Pásztói FC | 30 | 8 | 11 | 11 | 36 | 36 | 0 | 35 | |
| 13 | Tenk SE | 30 | 7 | 5 | 18 | 33 | 57 | −24 | 26 | Relegation to Megyei Bajnokság I |
| 14 | Palotás SE | 30 | 5 | 4 | 21 | 26 | 71 | −45 | 19 | Relegation to Megyei Bajnokság I |
| 15 | Balassagyarmati LC | 30 | 3 | 5 | 22 | 24 | 91 | −67 | 14 | Relegation to Megyei Bajnokság I |
| 16 | Apci TE | 30 | 2 | 7 | 21 | 20 | 88 | −68 | 13 | Relegation to Megyei Bajnokság I |

=== Tisza group ===
| Pos | Team | Pld | W | D | L | GF | GA | GD | Pts | Promotion or relegation |
|---|---|---|---|---|---|---|---|---|---|---|
| 1 | FC Sényő | 30 | 17 | 6 | 7 | 68 | 39 | +29 | 57 | Promotion to Nemzeti Bajnokság II |
| 2 | Mátészalkai MTK | 30 | 15 | 3 | 12 | 53 | 46 | +7 | 48 | |
| 3 | Tiszaújvárosi SE | 30 | 14 | 5 | 11 | 41 | 40 | +1 | 47 | |
| 4 | Tiszafüred Ivecospeed VSE | 30 | 10 | 15 | 5 | 31 | 20 | +11 | 45 | |
| 5 | Karcag Épkar SE | 30 | 12 | 9 | 9 | 46 | 37 | +9 | 45 | |
| 6 | Kisvárdai SE 1 | 30 | 14 | 8 | 8 | 49 | 26 | +23 | 44 (Note: 6 points deducted) | |
| 7 | Nagykálló SE | 30 | 12 | 8 | 10 | 39 | 45 | −6 | 44 | |
| 8 | Nyírbátor FC | 30 | 11 | 10 | 9 | 50 | 38 | +12 | 43 | |
| 9 | Rakamazi Spartacus SE | 30 | 12 | 7 | 11 | 47 | 43 | +4 | 43 | |
| 10 | Ózdi FC | 30 | 11 | 9 | 10 | 45 | 37 | +8 | 42 | |
| 11 | Szerencs-Balox VSE 2 | 30 | 10 | 10 | 10 | 44 | 39 | +5 | 37 (Note: 3 points deducted) | Relegation to Megyei Bajnokság I |
| 12 | Vámospércsi Bocskai SE | 30 | 8 | 12 | 10 | 29 | 41 | −12 | 36 | |
| 13 | Borsodi Építők Volán SC | 30 | 11 | 3 | 16 | 39 | 52 | −13 | 36 | |
| 14 | Encsi VSC | 30 | 7 | 13 | 10 | 42 | 45 | −3 | 34 | Relegation to Megyei Bajnokság I |
| 15 | Kunhegyes Egységes SE 3 | 30 | 10 | 5 | 15 | 37 | 55 | −18 | 12 (Note: 12 or 23 points deducted?) | Relegation to Megyei Bajnokság I |
| 16 | Edelényi VSE | 30 | 2 | 5 | 23 | 17 | 74 | −57 | 11 | Relegation to Megyei Bajnokság I |

== See also ==
- 1994–95 Magyar Kupa
- 1994–95 Nemzeti Bajnokság I
- 1994–95 Nemzeti Bajnokság II
