= Lipót =

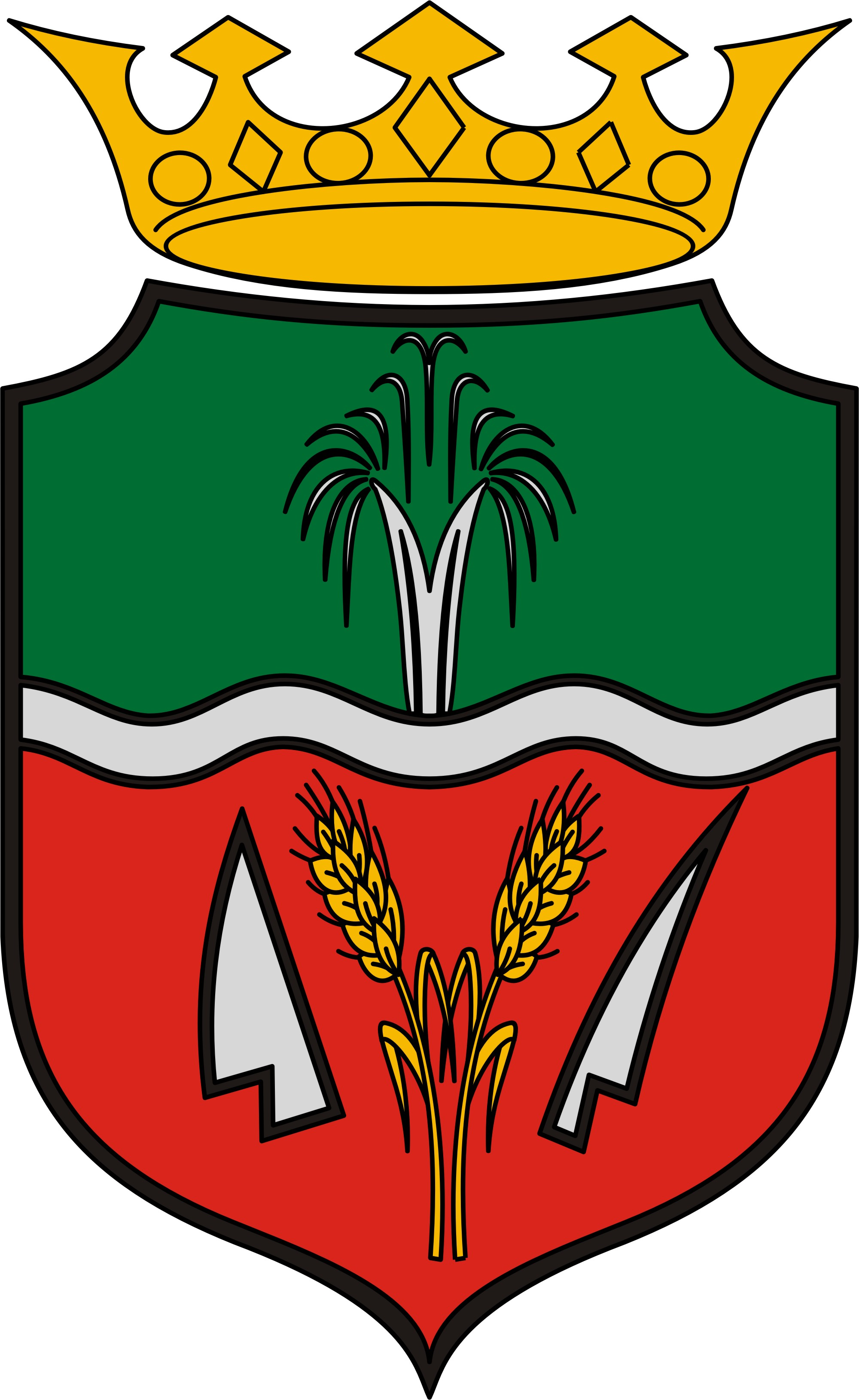
- Coat of arms

- Location of Győr-Moson-Sopron county in Hungary

- Location of Lipót
- Coordinates: 47.86296°N 17.46482°E
- Country: Hungary
- County: Győr-Moson-Sopron

Government
  - Mayor: Tóth József Péter (Ind.)

Area
  - Total: 16.09 km^{2} (6.21 sq mi)

Population (2022)
  - Total: 768
  - Density: 47.7/km^{2} (124/sq mi)
- Time zone: UTC+1 (CET)
  - Summer (DST): UTC+2 (CEST)
- Postal code: 9233
- Area code: 96

Lipót is a village in Győr-Moson-Sopron county, Hungary.

== Twin towns and sister cities ==
Lipót is twinned with:

- Bad Sauerbrunn, Austria
- Baka, Slovakia
- Lázně Toušeň, Czech Republic
- Lesignano de' Bagni, Italy
- Malnaș-Băi, Romania
- Miasino, Italy
- Surviliškis, Lithuania
- Wiesen, Austria
- Zasadbreg, Croatia
