= Bőny SE =

Hungarian football club

- Full name: Bőny Sportegyesület
- Founded: 1957; 68 years ago
- Ground: Chudik Lajos Sporttelep
Home colours	Away colours

Bőny SE-Royal Plast is a football club based in Bőny, Győr-Moson-Sopron County, Hungary, that competes in the Győr-Moson-Sopron county league.

== Name changes ==
- ? –1992: Bőnyrétalap
- 1992 : Bőny and Rétalap villages split up
- 1992–2021: Bőny SE
- 2021–present: Bőny SE-Royal Plast
