= Csesztreg SE =

Hungarian football club

- Full name: Csesztreg Községi Sportegyesület
- Founded: 1928; 98 years ago
- Ground: Csesztregi Szabadidőközpont
Home colours	Away colours

Csesztreg Sportegyesület is an amateur football club based in Csesztreg, Zala County, Hungary. The club competes in the Zala county league 1st division.

== Name changes ==
1. Csesztregi SK
2. Csesztregi MEDOSZ
3. Csesztregi Községi SK
4. Csesztreg SE
5. Csesztreg KSE-Femat 1999 - 2022
6. Csesztreg Községi Sportegyesület 2022 -
