= Szegedi VSE Stadion =

Sports stadium in Hungary

- Interactive map of Szegedi VSE Stadion
- Location: Szeged, Hungary
- Coordinates: 46.2643°N 20.1289°E
- Owner: Szegedi városi Önkormányzat
- Capacity: 5,000
- Field size: 105 x 68 meters

Construction
- Opened: 1937

Tenant
- Szeged 2011 (2011–present)

Szegedi VSE Stadion is a sports stadium in Szeged, Hungary. The stadium is home to the famous association football side Szeged 2011. The stadium has a capacity of 5,000.

== Attendance ==
=== Records ===
Record Attendance:

- 10,000 Szegedi EOL AK v Rába ETO, April 21, 1984
