= Lesignano de' Bagni =

- Comune
- Comune di Lesignano de' Bagni
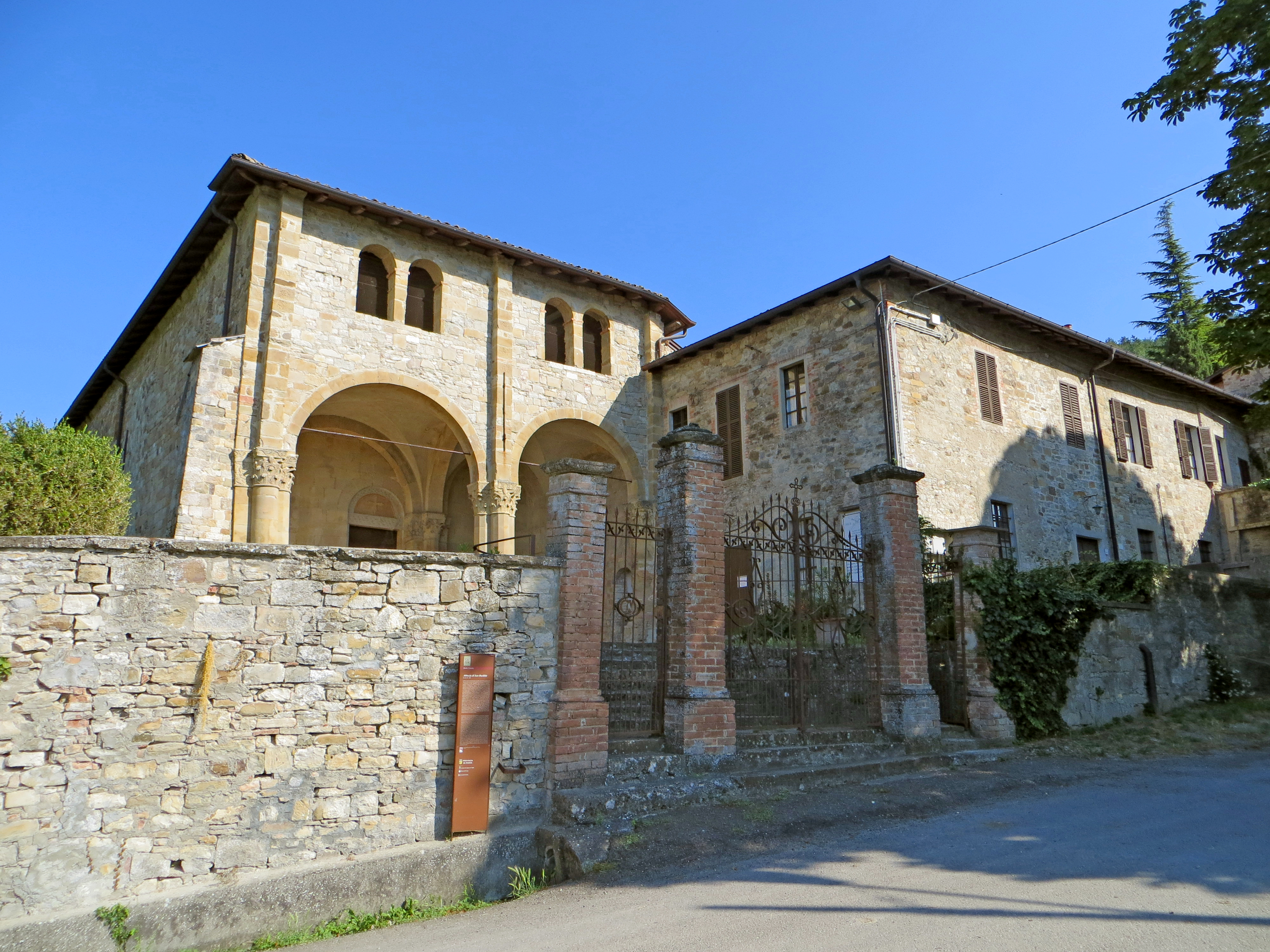
- Abbey of San Basilide

- Coat of arms

- Location within Italy Location within Emilia-Romagna
- Coordinates: 44°39′N 10°18′E
- Country: Italy
- Region: Emilia-Romagna
- Province: Parma (PR)
- Frazioni: Bassa, Caseificio, Cavirano, Costa, Faviano di Sopra, Faviano di Sotto, Fienile, Fossola, La Porta, Masdone, Monti Vitali, Mulazzano Monte, Mulazzano Ponte, Rivalta, Saliceto, San Michele Cavana, Santa Maria del Piano, Stadirano, Tassara

Government
  - Mayor: Giorgio Cavatorta

Area
  - Total: 47.5 km^{2} (18.3 sq mi)
- Elevation: 252 m (827 ft)

Population (31 May 2007)
  - Total: 4,039
  - Density: 85.0/km^{2} (220/sq mi)
- Time zone: UTC+1 (CET)
  - Summer (DST): UTC+2 (CEST)
- Postal code: 43037
- Dialing code: 0521
- Website: Official website

Lesignano de' Bagni (Parmigiano: Lezgnàn di Bagn) is a comune (municipality) in the Province of Parma in the Italian region Emilia-Romagna, located about 90 kilometres (56 mi) west of Bologna and about 15 kilometres (9 mi) south of Parma.

Of note in the town is the Romanesque church and monastery comprising the Abbazia di San Basilide in the neighborhood of San Michele Cavana.

== Twin towns ==
Lesignano de' Bagni is twinned with:

- Chaponost, France, since 2008
