= Taksony =

Taksony Taks
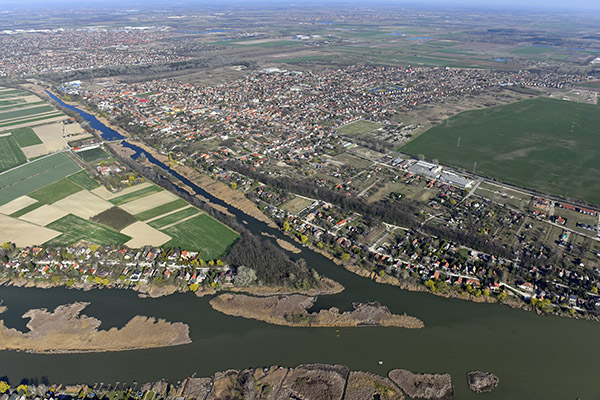

- Location of Taksony in Hungary
- Coordinates: 47.33174°N 19.06276°E
- Country: Hungary
- Region: Central Hungary
- County: Pest
- Subregion: Szigetszentmiklósi
- Rank: Town

Area
  - Total: 20.85 km^{2} (8.05 sq mi)

Population (2011)
  - Total: 6,352
  - Density: 304.7/km^{2} (789.0/sq mi)
- Time zone: UTC+1 (CET)
  - Summer (DST): UTC+2 (CEST)
- Postal code: 2335
- Area code: +36 24
- Website: http://www.taksony.hu/

Taksony (German: Taks) is a town of roughly 6,000 inhabitants roughly 23 kilometers south of Budapest, on the bank of the Ráckeve branch of the Danube known as Kisduna (Little Danube). Taksony is known for its many natural springs and tranquil scenery and serves as a haven for fishermen, boaters and summer vacationers.

== History ==
Taksony was named after the reigning prince Taksony of Hungary, Prince Árpád's grandson. After the invasion of the Mongols, the settlement was destroyed several times by fire. Maria Theresa settled Germans here. Relocation of families occurred after World War II and shortly thereafter, a new phase of development began. The Saint Anna Roman Catholic Church, devastated by an earthquake, was rebuilt in 1958. The foundation stone of the Calvinist church was laid on September 6, 1987. The early 20th century life of the ethnic Germans is presented in the House of Regional Traditions which is a traditional home with relics of German settlers, from early the years of the 20th century. Taksony's Catholic parish is famous for its Saint Anna feasts.

== Sport ==
- Taksony SE
