= Sényő FC =

Hungarian football club

- Full name: Sényő Futball Club
- Founded: 1946; 80 years ago
- Ground: Sényői Sportpálya
- Manager: Valér Kapacina
- League: NB III; Northeast
- 2023–24: NB III; Northeast, 11th of 16
- Website: https://senyofc.hu/
Home colours

Sényő Futball Club is a professional football club based in Sényő, Szabolcs-Szatmár-Bereg County, Hungary, that competes in the Nemzeti Bajnokság III – Northeast, the third tier of Hungarian football.

== Name changes ==
- 2015–present: Sényő-Carnifex FC

== History ==
In the 2018–19 Magyar Kupa season Sényő were eliminated by 2018–19 Nemzeti Bajnokság I club Ferencváros by 4–0 at home.

On 15 November 2023, Sándor Nagy was appointed as the manager of the club.

On 27 June 2024, Valer Kapacina was appointed as the player-coach of the club.

== Honours ==
- Nemzeti Bajnokság III:
  - Winners (1): 1994–95

== Seasons ==
The table below shows the seasons of Sényő FC.

Season	Tier	Club's name	Position	Pts
1957–58	7	Sényő	3 / 6	9
1964	7	Sényő	6 / 12	25
1965	7	Sényő	5 / 12	23
1966	7	Sényő	1 / 12	32
1967	7	Sényő	1 / 12	31
1968	7	Sényő	8 / 14	25
1969	7	Sényő	2 / 14	35
1970	7	Sényő	7 / 14	15
1970–71	7	Sényői TSZ	3 / 14	34
1971–72	6	Sényői TSZ SE	11 / 16	18
1972–73	6	Sényői TSZ SE	8 / 16	27
1973–74	6	Sényői TSZ	14 / 16	12
1974–75	6	Sényő	4 / 16	39
1975–76	6	Sényő	3 / 18	40
1976–77	6	Sényő	1 / 17	34
1977–78	6	Sényő	4 / 15	31
1978–79	5	Sényő	4 / 16	25
1979–80	5	Sényő	2 / 11	30
1980–81	5	Sényő	2 / 16	43
1981–82	5	Sényő	2 / 16	39
1982–83	5	Sényő	6 / 16	32
1983–84	5	Sényő	2 / 16	47
1984–85	5	Sényő	4 / 18	48
1985–86	5	Sényő	9 / 16	28
1986–87	5	Sényő	9 / 16	30
1987–88	5	Sényői TSZ SE	6 / 16	30
1988–89	5	Sényői TSZ SE	13 / 16	25
1989–90	5	Sényői TSZ SE	4 / 16	36
1990–91	5	Sényői TSZ SE	1 / 16	47
1991–92	4	Sényői TSZ SE	3 / 16	45
1992–93	4	Sényői TSZ SE	2 / 16	43
1993–94	4	Sényő FC	1 / 16	51
1994–95	3	FC Sényő	1 / 16	57
1995–96	2	FC Sényő	12 / 16	29
1996–97	2	Sényő-PA-NA Bt.	16 / 16	0
1999–00	6	Volán-Sényő FC	2 / 16	65
2000–01	6	Volán-Sényő	1 / 16	83
2001–02	5	Volán-Sényő	2 / 16	63
2002–03	5	Volán Sényő	1 / 16	58
2003–04	4	Volán-Sényő	7 / 15	43
2004–05	4	Sényő	4 / 15	53
2005–06	3	Volán-Sényő FC	6 / 16	50
2006–07	3	Volán-Sényő SC	9 / 14	32
2007–08	3	Volán-Sényő SC	10 / 16	37
2008–09	3	Volán-Sényő SC	16 / 16	20
2009–10	4	Volán-Sényő SC	14 / 18	39
2010–11	4	Volán Sényő SC	14 / 18	40
2011–12	5	Volán Sényő SC	6 / 16	50
2012–13	5	Volán Sényő SC	1 / 16	68
2013–14	4	Volán-Sényő SC	16 / 16	18
2014–15	5	Volán-Sényő SC	1 / 16	82
2015–16	4	Sényő-Carnifex FC	3 / 16	49
2016–17	4	Sényő-Carnifex FC	6 / 16	41
2017–18	4	Sényő-Carnifex FC	1 / 16	83
2018–19	3	Sényő-Carnifex FC	6 / 16	49
2019–20	3	Sényő-Carnifex FC	4 / 16	32
2020–21	3	Sényő-Carnifex FC	8 / 20	57
2021–22	3	Sényő-Carnifex FC	7 / 20	62
2022–23	3	Sényő-Carnifex FC	8 / 20	57
2023–24	3	Sényő FC-Selyem-Ber	11 / 16	36
2024–25	3	Sényő FC-Selyem-Ber	12 / 16	32
2025–26	3	Sényő FC-ZMB Building	15 / 16	28

== Managers ==
- Sándor Nagy (15 November 2023-)
