= Csesztreg =

- Village
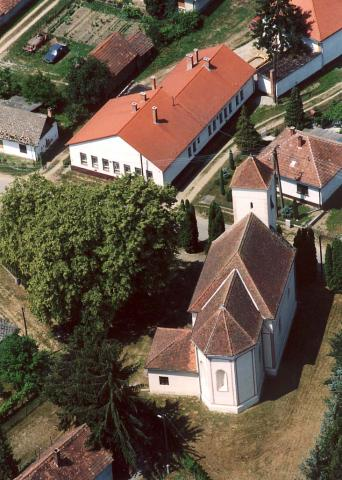

- Flag Coat of arms

- Location of Csesztreg
- Coordinates: 46.707789°N 16.528281°E
- Country: Hungary
- Region: Western Transdanubia
- County: Zala
- District: Lenti

Area
  - Total: 23 km^{2} (8.9 sq mi)

Population (1 January 2025)
  - Total: 781
  - Density: 34/km^{2} (88/sq mi)
- Time zone: UTC+1 (CET)
  - Summer (DST): UTC+2 (CEST)
- Postal code: 8973
- Area code: (+36) 92
- Website: csesztreg.hu

Csesztreg is a village in Zala County, Hungary.

== Etymology ==
The name comes from a Slavic hydronym: *Čistъ strugъ 'clean stream'. The name was attested in 1334/1347 as Cheztregh.

== Sport ==
- Csesztreg SE, association football club
