= Buzánszky Jenő Stadion =

Soccer stadium in Hungary

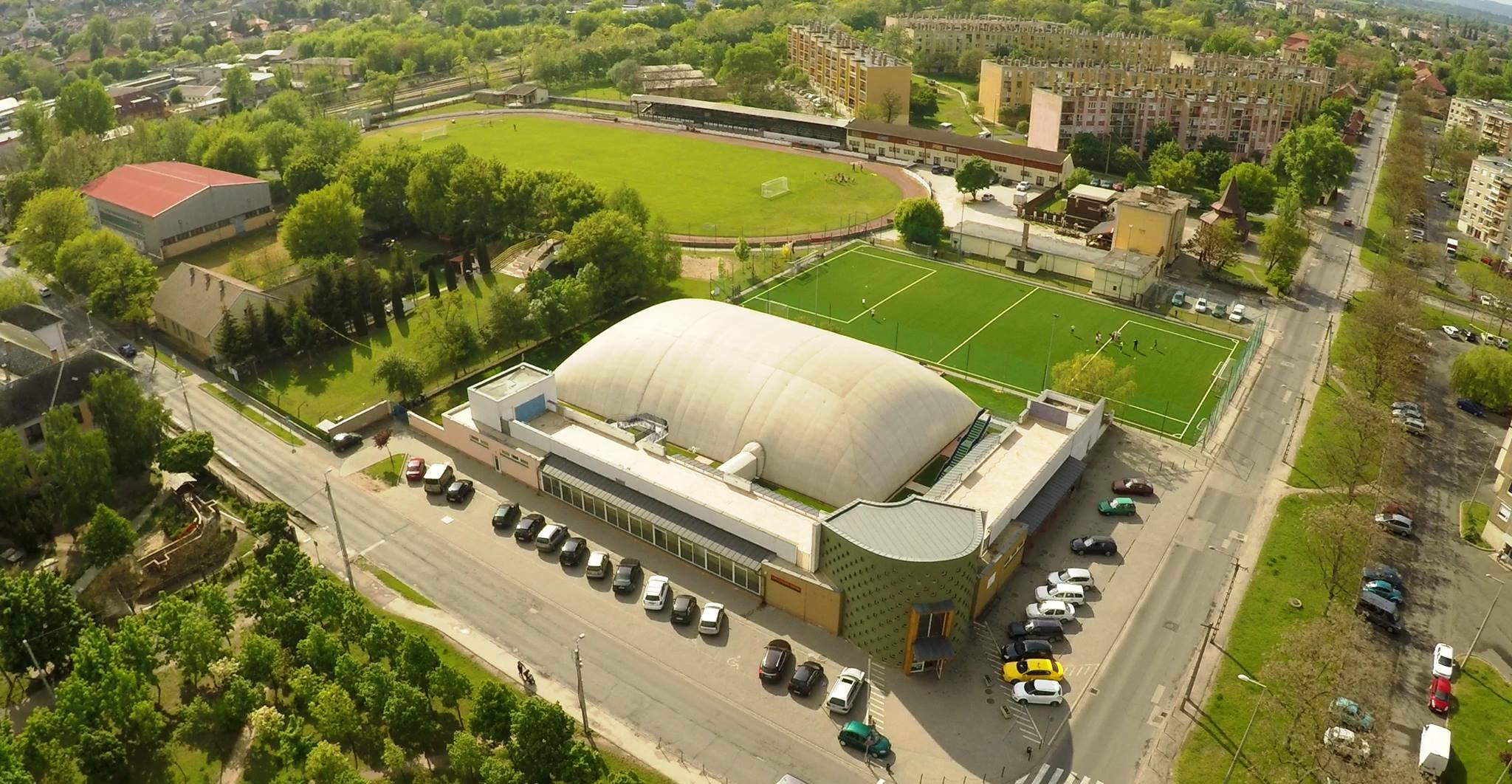
- Interactive map of Buzánszky Jenő Stadion
- Location: Dorog, Hungary
- Coordinates: 47.72°N 18.73°E
- Owner: Dorogi FC
- Capacity: 4,000
- Field size: 105 × 68 m

Construction
- Groundbreaking: 1918–1921
- Opened: 1921
- Renovated: 1945, 1971–1974, 1988–1989
- Architect: Zoltán Gáthy

Tenant
- Dorogi FC

Buzánszky Jenő Stadion is a sports stadium in Dorog, Hungary. The stadium is home to the association football side Dorogi FC. The stadium has a capacity of 4,000. It is named after former Dorog player Jenő Buzánszky.
