= Lipót SE =

Hungarian football club

- Full name: Lipót Sport Egyesület
- Founded: 1968; 57 years ago
Home colours	Away colours

Lipót Sport Egyesület is a professional football club based in Lipót, Győr-Moson-Sopron County, Hungary. The club competes in the Győr-Moson-Sopron county league.
