= Baka, Slovakia =

Baka
- Municipality
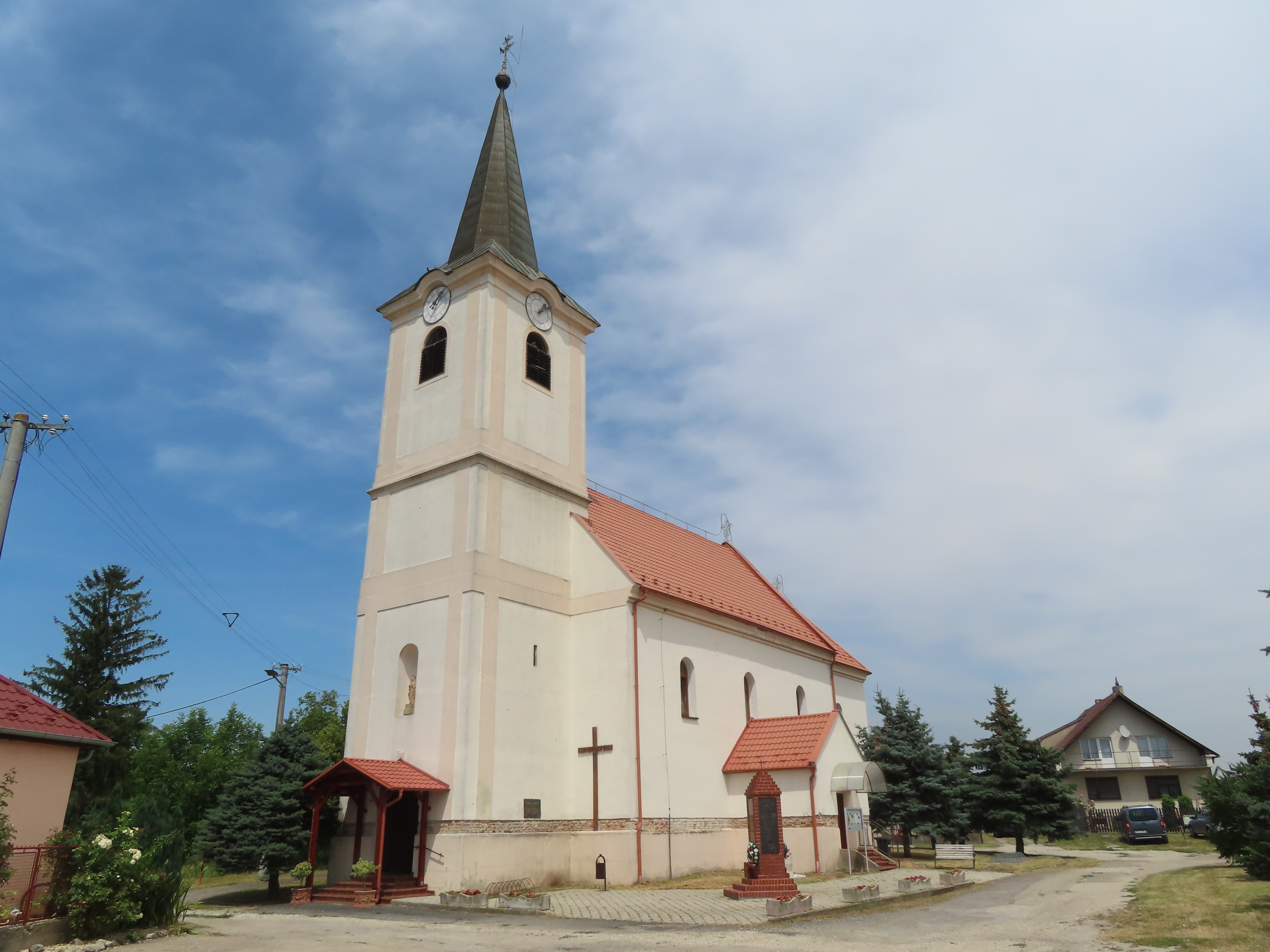

- Flag

- Location of Baka in the Trnava Region Location of Baka in Slovakia
- Coordinates: 47°54′00″N 17°32′00″E
- Country: Slovakia
- Region: Trnava Region
- District: Dunajská Streda District
- First mentioned: 1264

Government
  - Mayor: Erzsébet Csizik

Area
  - Total: 19.98 km^{2} (7.71 sq mi)
- Elevation: 115 m (377 ft)

Population (2025)
  - Total: 1,137

Ethnicity
  - Hungarians: 92.50%
  - Slovaks: 6.95%
- Time zone: UTC+1 (CET)
  - Summer (DST): UTC+2 (CEST)
- Postal code: 930 04
- Area code: +421 31
- Vehicle registration plate (until 2022): DS
- Website: www.obecbaka.sk

Baka (Hungarian: Baka, Hungarian pronunciation: [ˈbɒkɒ]) is a village and municipality in the Dunajská Streda District in the Trnava Region of south-west Slovakia.

It has a football club, the FC BAKA.

== Geography ==
The municipality lies at an altitude of 115 metres (377 ft) and covers an area of 19.98 km^{2} (7.71 sq mi) (2025).

== History ==
In the 9th century, the territory of Baka became part of the Kingdom of Hungary. In historical records the village was first mentioned in 1264. After the Austro-Hungarian army disintegrated in November 1918, Czechoslovak troops occupied the area, later acknowledged internationally by the Treaty of Trianon. Between 1938 and 1945 Baka once more became part of Miklós Horthy's Hungary through the First Vienna Award. From 1945 until the Velvet Divorce, it was part of Czechoslovakia. Since then it has been part of Slovakia.

== Population ==
Population statistic (10 years)
Year	1995	2005	2015	2025
Count	1126	1119	1096	1137
Difference		−0.62%	−2.05%	+3.74%

Population statistic
Year	2024	2025
Count	1130	1137
Difference		+0.61%

It has a population of 1137 people (31 December 2025).

=== Ethnicity ===
Census 2021 (1+ %)
Ethnicity	Number	Fraction
Hungarian	979	86.17%
Slovak	161	14.17%
Not found out	52	4.57%
Total	1136	

In year 2021 was 1136 people by ethnicity 979 as Hungarian, 161 as Slovak, 52 as Not found out, 3 as Other, 2 as Serbian, 1 as Czech, 1 as German, 1 as Bulgarian and 1 as English.

Note on population: The difference values of population numbers in the table "Population statistic" and in the sections "Ethnicity" & "Religion" is caused by the use of various statistical methods.

=== Religion ===
Census 2021 (1+ %)
Religion	Number	Fraction
Roman Catholic Church	931	81.95%
None	108	9.51%
Not found out	47	4.14%
Greek Catholic Church	14	1.23%
Calvinist Church	12	1.06%
Total	1136	

In year 2021 was 1136 people by religion 931 from Roman Catholic Church, 108 from None, 47 from Not found out, 14 from Greek Catholic Church, 12 from Calvinist Church, 8 from Evangelical Church, 7 from Christian Congregations in Slovakia, 4 from Other, 2 from Buddhism, 1 from Other and not ascertained christian church, 1 from Islam and 1 from United Methodist Church.

== Genealogical resources ==
The records for genealogical research are available at the state archive in Bratislava (Slovak: Štátny archív v Bratislave)

- Roman Catholic church records (births/marriages/deaths): 1676-1728 (parish B), 1728-1908 (parish A)
- Reformated church records (births/marriages/deaths): 1854-1896
- Census records 1869 of Baka are not available at the state archive.

== See also ==
- List of municipalities and towns in Slovakia
