= Szegedi EOL SC =

Association football club in Hungary

SZEOL
- Full name: Szegedi Egységes Oktatási Labdarúgó Sport Club
- Founded: 1899; 127 years ago
- Ground: Szegedi VSE Stadion
- Capacity: 5,000
- Manager: Gábor Buchholcz (interim)
- League: NB III
- 2018–19: NB III, Centre, 3rd
- Website: https://szeolsc.hu/
Home colours

Szegedi Egységes Oktatási Labdarúgó Sport Club, commonly known as SZEOL SC, is a Hungarian association football club based in the town of Szeged.

== History ==
Szegedi Egységes Oktatási Labdarúgó SC debuted in the 2016–17 Nemzeti Bajnokság II season of the Hungarian League.

== Managers ==
- (Serbia) Zoran Kuntić

== Seasons ==
The table below shows the seasons of Szegedi EOL.

Season	Tier	Club's name	Position	Pts
1970	7	Szegedi Volán	0 / 13	
1970–71	7	Szegedi Volán	4 / 12	30
1971–72	7	Szegedi Volán	1 / 14	
1972–73	6	Szegedi Volán	8 / 14	26
1973–74	6	Szegedi Volán	3 / 14	31
1974–75	5	Szegedi Volán	3 / 14	32
1975–76	5	Szegedi Volán	2 / 14	32
1976–77	5	Szegedi Volán	13 / 14	11
1993–94	-	-	-	-
1994–95	-	-	-	-
1995–96	-	-	-	-
1996–97	-	-	-	-
1997–98	-	-	-	-
1998–99	-	-	-	-
1999–2000	-	-	-	-
2000–01	-	-	-	-
2001–02	-	-	-	-
2002–03	-	-	-	-
2003–04	-	-	-	-
2004–05	-	-	-	-
2005–06	4	Tisza Volán SC	3 / 18	73
2006–07	4	Tisza Volán SC	1 / 16	78
2007–08	3	Tisza Volán SC	7 / 16	50
2008–09	3	Tisza Volán SC	11 / 16	37
2009–10	3	Tisza Volán SC	4 / 14	39
2010–11	3	Tisza Volán SC	8 / 15	42
2011–12	3	Tisza Volán SC Szeged	4 / 16	51
2012–13	3	Tisza Volán SC	10 / 14	30
2013–14	4	Tisza Volán SC	1 / 16	80
2014–15	3	SZEOL SC	5 / 16	49
2015–16	3	SZEOL SC	2 / 17	63
2016–17	2	SZEOL SC	20 / 20	16
2017–18	3	SZEOL SC	5 / 16	53
2018–19	3	SZEOL SC	3 / 16	55
