= Taksony SE =

Hungarian football club

Takosny SE
- Full name: Taksony Sportegyesület
- Founded: 1932; 94 years ago
- League: NB III
- 2017–18: MB I, Pest, 1st (promoted)
Home colours

Taksony Sportegyesület is a professional football club based in Taksony, Pest County, Hungary, that competes in the Nemzeti Bajnokság III, the third tier of Hungarian football.

== History ==
Taksony were eliminated in the round of 16 of the 2018–19 Magyar Kupa by MOL Vidi FC on 4–0 aggregate.

== Name changes ==
- 1932–1946: Taksony Sportkör

== Season results ==
As of 21 August 2018

Domestic												International		Manager	Ref.
Nemzeti Bajnokság											Magyar Kupa	International		Manager	Ref.
Div.	No.	Season	MP	W	D	L	GF–GA	Dif.	Pts.	Pos.	Magyar Kupa	Competition	Result	Manager	Ref.
NBIII	?.	2018–19	0	0	0	0	0–0	+0	0	TBD	TBD	Did not qualify		(Hungary)	
Σ		0	0	0	0	0–0	+0	0							
