= THSE Szabadkikötő =

Hungarian football club

THSE-Szabadkikötő
- Full name: Tintahalak Sportegyesület Szabadkikötő
- Founded: 2000; 26 years ago
- Ground: Pirosrózsa utcai sportpálya
- Capacity: 550
- Manager: Marcell Strebek
- League: MB I
- 2022–23: MB I, Budapest, 11th of 16
Home colours

Tintahalak Sportegyesület Szabadkikötő is a professional football club based in Sashalom, Budapest, Hungary, that competes in the Nemzeti Bajnokság III, the third tier of Hungarian football.

== History ==
THSE Sashalom is going to compete in the 2017–18 Nemzeti Bajnokság III.

On 12 August 2017, Sashalom beat Csepel FC 2–1 at the Béke téri Stadion, Csepel, Budapest on the first matchday of the 2017-18 Nemzeti Bajnokság III season.

== Honours ==
=== Domestic ===
- Blasz I:
  - Winners (1): 2016–17

== Managers ==
- (Hungary) Marcell Strebek
