= 2017–18 Debreceni VSC season =

Debreceni VSC
2017–18 season
- Chairman: (Hungary) Gábor Szima
- Manager: (Hungary) András Herczeg
- NB 1: 5th
- Hungarian Cup: Semi-final
- Top goalscorer: League: (Switzerland) Haris Tabaković (12); All: (Switzerland) Haris Tabaković (13)
- Highest home attendance: 10,841 v Ferencváros (14 April 2018)
- Lowest home attendance: 800 v Dorog (20 February 2018)
Home colours	Away colours	Third colours

The 2017–18 season will be Debreceni VSC's 40th competitive season, 25th consecutive season in the OTP Bank Liga and 115th year in existence as a football club.

== First team squad ==
Note: Flags indicate national team as defined under FIFA eligibility rules; some limited exceptions apply. Players may hold more than one non-FIFA nationality.

No.	Pos.	Nation	Player
1	GK	UKR	Oleksandr Nad
2	DF	HUN	Ákos Kinyik
3	DF	HUN	Csaba Szatmári
4	MF	ROU	Ioan Filip
6	DF	HUN	Balázs Bényei
8	MF	HUN	Dániel Tőzsér
10	FW	HUN	Tibor Tisza
11	MF	HUN	János Ferenczi
14	DF	HUN	Krisztián Kuti
15	DF	HUN	Szabolcs Barna
16	FW	HUN	Péter Bíró
17	DF	HUN	Norbert Mészáros
19	MF	CMR	Justin Mengolo

No.	Pos.	Nation	Player
20	FW	HUN	Tamás Takács
21	MF	HUN	Kevin Varga
23	FW	HUN	Dániel Bereczki
24	MF	SRB	Danilo Sekulić
25	FW	SUI	Haris Tabaković
27	MF	HUN	Ádám Bódi
29	MF	HUN	Erik Kusnyír
33	MF	HUN	Richárd Csősz
42	FW	HUN	Norbert Könyves
70	MF	HUN	Kevin Nagy
77	MF	BIH	Aleksandar Jovanović
86	GK	SVK	Tomáš Košický
99	MF	HUN	Bence Sós

== Transfers ==
=== Summer ===
In: Note: Flags indicate national team as defined under FIFA eligibility rules; some limited exceptions apply. Players may hold more than one non-FIFA nationality.

No.	Pos.	Nation	Player
1	GK	UKR	Oleksandr Nad (from Gyirmót)
2	DF	HUN	Ákos Kinyik (loan return from Budaörs)
6	DF	HUN	Balázs Bényei (from Békéscsaba)
12	GK	SVK	Ján Novota (from (Austria) Rapid Wien)
14	DF	HUN	Krisztián Kuti (loan return from Cigánd)
20	FW	HUN	Tamás Takács (loan return from Nyíregyháza)
21	MF	HUN	Kevin Varga (loan return from Cigánd)
25	FW	SUI	Haris Tabaković (from (Switzerland) Grasshopper)
27	MF	HUN	Ádám Bódi (loan from Videoton)
44	FW	HUN	Tibor Tisza (from Nyíregyháza)
99	MF	HUN	Bence Sós (loan return from Mezőkövesd)

Out: Note: Flags indicate national team as defined under FIFA eligibility rules; some limited exceptions apply. Players may hold more than one non-FIFA nationality.

No.	Pos.	Nation	Player
1	GK	CRO	Ivan Kelava (to (Romania) Politehnica Iași)
2	DF	HUN	Attila Osváth (loan return to Vasas)
10	MF	HUN	Dávid Holman (to (Slovakia) Slovan Bratislava)
15	MF	HUN	Dániel Völgyi (free agent)
16	MF	BIH	Ognjen Đelmić (free agent)
18	FW	NGA	Derick Ogbu (free agent)
22	FW	VEN	Frank Feltscher (free agent)
25	DF	SRB	Dušan Brković (free agent)
28	DF	HUN	Zoltán Nagy (to Debreceni EAC)
44	GK	SRB	Branislav Danilović (loan return to Puskás Akadémia)
53	MF	HUN	Péter Berdó (to Szolnok)
70	MF	UKR	Ivan Bobko (to (Ukraine) Chornomorets Odesa)
87	GK	HUN	István Verpecz (to Paks)
90	FW	BIH	Haris Handžić (to (Bosnia and Herzegovina) Zrinjski Mostar)
91	FW	KOR	Suk Hyun-jun (loan return to (Portugal) Porto)

=== Winter ===
In: Note: Flags indicate national team as defined under FIFA eligibility rules; some limited exceptions apply. Players may hold more than one non-FIFA nationality.

No.	Pos.	Nation	Player
86	GK	SVK	Tomáš Košický (from (Israel) Hapoel Ra'anana)
—	FW	HUN	Krisztián Kerekes (loan return from Budafok)

Out: Note: Flags indicate national team as defined under FIFA eligibility rules; some limited exceptions apply. Players may hold more than one non-FIFA nationality.

No.	Pos.	Nation	Player
5	DF	HUN	Péter Szilvási (to Gyirmót)
12	GK	SVK	Ján Novota (retired)
27	MF	SVK	Karol Mészáros (to Szombathelyi Haladás)

== Competitions ==
=== Nemzeti Bajnokság I ===
==== League table ====
Pos	Team	Pld	W	D	L	GF	GA	GD	Pts	Qualification or relegation
3	Újpest	33	12	13	8	41	38	+3	49	Qualification for the Europa League first qualifying round (Note: Since the winners of the 2017–18 Magyar Kupa, Újpest, qualified for European competition based on league position, the spot awarded to the cup winners (Europa League first qualifying round) was passed to the fourth-placed team.)
4	Honvéd	33	13	8	12	50	53	−3	47	Qualification for the Europa League first qualifying round
5	Debrecen	33	12	8	13	53	47	+6	44	
6	Puskás Akadémia	33	11	10	12	41	46	−5	43	
7	Paks	33	11	9	13	43	48	−5	42	

Source: Hungarian Football Federation (in Hungarian), Soccerway
Rules for classification: 1) Points; 2) Matches won; 3) Goal difference; 4) Goals scored; 5) Head-to-head points; 6) Head-to-head goal difference; 7) Head-to-head away goals scored; 8) Fair play ranking; 9) Drawing of lots.

==== Results summary ====
Overall								Home						Away					
Pld	W	D	L	GF	GA	GD	Pts	W	D	L	GF	GA	GD	W	D	L	GF	GA	GD
33	12	8	13	53	47	+6	44	6	4	6	27	25	+2	6	4	7	26	22	+4

Last updated: 2 June 2018.
Source: NB1

==== Results by round ====
Round	1	2	3	4	5	6	7	8	9	10	11	12	13	14	15	16	17	18	19	20	21	22	23	24	25	26	27	28	29	30	31	32	33
Ground	H	A	A	H	A	H	A	H	A	H	A	A	H	H	A	H	A	H	A	H	A	H	H	A	A	H	A	H	A	H	A	H	A
Result	L	L	D	D	L	W	W	W	W	W	D	W	D	W	L	L	W	W	L	L	D	L	L	D	W	D	L	L	W	W	L	D	L
Position	10	12	11	11	11	11	7	5	4	3	4	3	3	3	3	3	3	3	3	3	3	3	4	5	3	3	4	6	5	3	4	4	5

Updated to match(es) played on 2 June 2018. Source: Matches
A = Away; H = Home; W = Win; D = Draw; L = Loss

==== Matches ====
15 July 2017 1	Debrecen	1 – 2	Mezőkövesd	Debrecen
18:00 CEST	Ferenczi 76'	Report	Gohér 63'; Hudák 90+3'	Stadium: Nagyerdei Stadion; Attendance: 4,401; Referee: (Hungary) Csaba Pintér

22 July 2017 2	Szombathelyi Haladás	1 – 0	Debrecen	Sopron
20:30 CEST	Williams 3'	Report		Stadium: Káposztás utcai Stadion; Attendance: 1,276; Referee: (Hungary) Balázs Berke

29 July 2017 3	Paks	1 – 1	Debrecen	Paks
18:00 CEST	Bertus 68'	Report	Sós 45'	Stadium: Fehérvári úti Stadion; Attendance: 800; Referee: (Hungary) Ádám Németh

6 August 2017 4	Debrecen	0 – 0	Ferencváros	Debrecen
18:00 CEST		Report		Stadium: Nagyerdei Stadion; Attendance: 5,306; Referee: (Hungary) Zsolt Szabó

12 August 2017 5	Videoton	1 – 0	Debrecen	Felcsút
20:30 CEST	Lazović 90+6' (pen.)	Report		Stadium: Pancho Aréna; Attendance: 1,929; Referee: (Hungary) Viktor Kassai

18 August 2017 6	Debrecen	4 – 1	Vasas	Debrecen
19:30 CEST	Tőzsér 27' (pen.), 43'; Mengolo 30'; Varga 36'	Report	Szivacski 66'	Stadium: Nagyerdei Stadion; Attendance: 3,634; Referee: (Hungary) Zoltán Iványi

26 August 2017 7	Budapest Honvéd	1 – 3	Debrecen	Budapest
20:30 CEST	Eppel 58'	Report	Tőzsér 27' (pen.); Bódi 62'; Jovanović 90+1'	Stadium: Bozsik Stadion; Attendance: 2,537; Referee: (Hungary) Zsolt Szabó

9 September 2017 8	Debrecen	3 – 1	Diósgyőr	Debrecen
18:00 CEST	Varga 11'; Takács 85'; Tabaković 88'	Report	Óvári 4'	Stadium: Nagyerdei Stadion; Attendance: 5,538; Referee: (Hungary) Balázs Berke

16 September 2017 9	Balmazújváros	0 – 1	Debrecen	Balmazújváros
18:00 CEST		Report	Tabaković 47'	Stadium: Városi Sportpálya; Attendance: 2,291; Referee: (Hungary) Tamás Bognár

23 September 2017 10	Debrecen	3 – 0	Puskás Akadémia	Debrecen
18:00 CEST	Varga 44'; Könyves 82'; Tőzsér 86'	Report		Stadium: Nagyerdei Stadion; Attendance: 3,241; Referee: (Hungary) Jószef Erdős

30 September 2017 11	Újpest	1 – 1	Debrecen	Budapest
18:00 CEST	Pávkovics 23'	Report	Takács 35'	Stadium: Szusza Ferenc Stadion; Attendance: 3,139; Referee: (Hungary) Ferenc Karakó

14 October 2017 12	Mezőkövesd	0 – 2	Debrecen	Mezőkövesd
15:30 CEST		Report	Mengolo 28'; Bódi 84'	Stadium: Városi Stadion; Attendance: 1,641; Referee: (Hungary) István Vad

21 October 2017 13	Debrecen	1 – 1	Szombathelyi Haladás	Debrecen
15:30 CEST	Tabaković 68'	Report	T. Kiss 3'	Stadium: Nagyerdei Stadion; Attendance: 6,025; Referee: (Hungary) Jószef Erdős

28 October 2017 14	Debrecen	3 – 2	Paks	Debrecen
15:30 CEST	Bódi 12', 74'; Tőzsér 55' (pen.)	Report	Papp 10', 61'	Stadium: Nagyerdei Stadion; Attendance: 2,802; Referee: (Hungary) Tamás Bognár

4 November 2017 15	Ferencváros	2 – 1	Debrecen	Budapest
15:30 CET	Varga 58'; Priskin 60'	Report	Jovanović 84'	Stadium: Groupama Arena; Attendance: 19,125; Referee: (Hungary) Sándor Andó-Szabó

18 November 2017 16	Debrecen	2 – 5	Videoton	Debrecen
19:30 CET	Könyves 26'; Takács 90+1'	Report	Šćepović 11', 59', 65' (pen.); Nego 22'; Géresi 82'	Stadium: Nagyerdei Stadion; Attendance: 3,169; Referee: (Hungary) Ádám Farkas

25 November 2017 17	Vasas	1 – 5	Debrecen	Budapest
15:30 CET	Ádám 81' (pen.)	Report	Takács 18', 36'; Sós 73'; Mengolo 90+1', 90+3'	Stadium: Szusza Ferenc Stadion; Attendance: 618; Referee: (Hungary) József Erdős

2 December 2017 18	Debrecen	1 – 0	Budapest Honvéd	Debrecen
15:30 CET	Takács 26'	Report		Stadium: Nagyerdei Stadion; Attendance: 2,521; Referee: (Hungary) Viktor Kassai

9 December 2017 19	Diósgyőr	3 – 2	Debrecen	Mezőkövesd
16:00 CET	Ugrai 12'; Karan 17'; Busai 77'	Report	Takács 36'; Tőzsér 82' (pen.)	Stadium: Városi Stadion; Attendance: 1,655; Referee: (Hungary) Tamás Bognár

24 February 2018 20	Debrecen	0 – 2	Balmazújváros	Debrecen
17:00 CET		Report	Arabuli 87'; Rácz 90+5'	Stadium: Nagyerdei Stadion; Attendance: 1,824; Referee: (Hungary) József Erdős

3 March 2018 21	Puskás Akadémia	0 – 0	Debrecen	Felcsút
17:00 CET		Report		Stadium: Pancho Arena; Attendance: 386; Referee: (Hungary) Sándor Andó-Szabó

10 March 2018 22	Debrecen	1 – 2	Újpest	Debrecen
14:30 CET	Könyves 76'	Report	Novothny 58'; Tischler 90'	Stadium: Nagyerdei Stadion; Attendance: 2,701; Referee: (Hungary) Zoltán Iványi

17 March 2018 23	Debrecen	2 – 3	Mezőkövesd	Debrecen
17:00 CET	Könyves 16'; Szatmári 81'	Report	Koszta 36' (pen.); Bognár 41'; Farkaš 55'	Stadium: Nagyerdei Stadion; Attendance: 1,635; Referee: (Hungary) Gergely Szőts

31 March 2018 24	Szombathelyi Haladás	1 – 1	Debrecen	Szombathely
19:30 CEST	Rabušic 60'	Report	Könyves 23'	Stadium: Haladás Sportkomplexum; Attendance: 3,133; Referee: (Hungary) Viktor Kassai

7 April 2018 25	Paks	2 – 5	Debrecen	Paks
17:00 CEST	Hahn 49', 69'	Report	Könyves 31', 40'; Tabaković 49', 55'; Takács 64'	Stadium: Fehérvári úti Stadion; Attendance: 977; Referee: (Hungary) Tamás Bognár

14 April 2018 26	Debrecen	1 – 1	Ferencváros	Debrecen
19:30 CEST	Könyves 37'	Report	Varga 8'	Stadium: Nagyerdei Stadion; Attendance: 10,841; Referee: (Hungary) Zoltán Iványi

21 April 2018 27	Videoton	1 – 0	Debrecen	Felcsút
19:30 CEST	Šćepović 20'	Report		Stadium: Pancho Aréna; Attendance: 2,524; Referee: (Hungary) István Vad

28 April 2018 28	Debrecen	2 – 3	Vasas	Debrecen
17:00 CEST	Tabaković 81', 84'	Report	Egerszegi 9', 24'; Beneš 51'	Stadium: Nagyerdei Stadion; Attendance: 3,214; Referee: (Hungary) Viktor Kassai

5 May 2018 29	Budapest Honvéd	1 – 3	Debrecen	Budapest
17:00 CEST	Eppel 45'	Report	Tabaković 14', 59'; Sós 16'	Stadium: Bozsik Stadion; Attendance: 2,358; Referee: (Hungary) Viktor Kassai

12 May 2018 30	Debrecen	2 – 1	Diósgyőr	Debrecen
17:00 CEST	Tabaković 14', 41'	Report	Bacsa 73'	Stadium: Nagyerdei Stadion; Attendance: 3,383; Referee: (Hungary) Ádám Farkas

19 May 2018 31	Balmazújváros	4 – 0	Debrecen	Balmazújváros
17:00 CEST	Andrić 37'; Vayda 47'; Rus 66'; Arabuli 88'	Report		Stadium: Városi Sportpálya; Attendance: 1,808; Referee: (Hungary) Viktor Kassai

27 May 2018 32	Debrecen	1 – 1	Puskás Akadémia	Debrecen
17:00 CEST	Tabaković 57'	Report	Radó 10'	Stadium: Nagyerdei Stadion; Attendance: 2,414; Referee: (Hungary) Tamás Bognár

2 June 2018 33	Újpest	2 – 1	Debrecen	Budapest
19:00 CEST	Novothny 53'; Nwobodo 63'	Report	Takács 70'	Stadium: Szusza Ferenc Stadion; Attendance: 4,249; Referee: (Hungary) Zsolt Szabó

=== Hungarian Cup ===
20 September 2017 Round 6	Csongrád	1 – 10	Debrecen	Csongrád
15:00 CEST		Report	Takács 4'; Borda 9' (o.g.); Tisza 23', 54', 60', 69', 73'; Nagy 56'; Bárány 65', 90+1'	Stadium: Városi Sportpálya; Referee: (Hungary) Tünde Anikó Kiss

24 October 2017 Round 7	Monor	2 – 3	Debrecen	Monor
13:30 CEST	Sági 73'; Tóth 83'	Report	Sekulić 48', 53'; Bíró 51'	Stadium: Balassi Bálint úti Stadion; Attendance: 700; Referee: (Hungary) Gergő Bogár

29 November 2017 Round 8	Budafok	0 – 3	Debrecen	Budapest
12:00 CET		Report	Mengolo 52'; Tisza 86' (pen.), 90'	Stadium: Budafoki MTK Sporttelep; Attendance: Match without spectators Referee: (Hungary) Péter Zierkelbach

20 February 2018 Last 16 (1st leg)	Debrecen	1 – 2	Dorog	Debrecen
17:00 CET	Kinyik 56'	Report	Mészáros 64', 82' (pen.)	Stadium: Nagyerdei Stadion; Attendance: 800; Referee: (Hungary) Ádám Németh

28 February 2018 Last 16 (2nd leg)	Dorog	2 – 3 (4 – 4 (a) agg.)	Debrecen	Dorog
13:00 CET	Bora 66'; Mészáros 84'	Report	Sós 16', 57'; Kinyik 83'	Stadium: Buzánszky Jenő Stadion; Attendance: 500; Referee: (Hungary) Ádám Farkas

14 March 2018 Quarter-final (1st leg)	Budapest Honvéd	0 – 0	Debrecen	Budapest
16:00 CET		Report		Stadium: Bozsik Stadion; Attendance: 1,178; Referee: (Hungary) Csaba Pintér

3 April 2018 Quarter-final (2nd leg)	Debrecen	3 – 1 (3 – 1 agg.)	Budapest Honvéd	Debrecen
17:30 CEST	Könyves 4', 38'; Tabaković 63'	Report	Eppel 68'	Stadium: Nagyerdei Stadion; Attendance: 1,542; Referee: (Hungary) István Vad

18 April 2018 Semi-final (1st leg)	Puskás Akadémia	4 – 0	Debrecen	Felcsút
20:15 CEST	Henty 2', 31'; Perošević 43'; Knežević 80'	Report		Stadium: Pancho Arena; Attendance: 818; Referee: (Hungary) József Erdős

8 May 2018 Semi-final (2nd leg)	Debrecen	2 – 0 (2 – 4 agg.)	Puskás Akadémia	Debrecen
20:00 CEST	Tisza 38'; Takács 50'	Report		Stadium: Nagyerdei Stadion; Attendance: 855; Referee: (Hungary) Zoltán Iványi

== Statistics ==
=== Appearances and goals ===
Last updated on 2 June 2018.

No.	Pos	Nat	Player	Total		OTP Bank Liga		Hungarian Cup	
No.	Pos	Nat	Player	Apps	Goals	Apps	Goals	Apps	Goals
1	GK	(Ukraine) UKR	Oleksandr Nad	32	-42	31	-40	1	-2
2	DF	(Hungary) HUN	Ákos Kinyik	34	2	28	0	6	2
3	DF	(Hungary) HUN	Csaba Szatmári	34	1	28	1	6	0
4	MF	(Romania) ROU	Ioan Filip	26	0	18	0	8	0
6	DF	(Hungary) HUN	Balázs Bényei	29	0	27	0	2	0
8	MF	(Hungary) HUN	Dániel Tőzsér	37	6	32	6	5	0
10	FW	(Hungary) HUN	Tibor Tisza	18	8	12	0	6	8
11	MF	(Hungary) HUN	János Ferenczi	25	1	23	1	2	0
14	DF	(Hungary) HUN	Krisztián Kuti	10	0	4	0	6	0
15	DF	(Hungary) HUN	Szabolcs Barna	17	0	10	0	7	0
16	FW	(Hungary) HUN	Péter Bíró	4	1	2	0	2	1
17	DF	(Hungary) HUN	Norbert Mészáros	26	0	19	0	7	0
19	MF	(Cameroon) CMR	Justin Mengolo	22	5	19	4	3	1
20	FW	(Hungary) HUN	Tamás Takács	32	11	25	9	7	2
21	MF	(Hungary) HUN	Kevin Varga	33	3	27	3	6	0
23	MF	(Hungary) HUN	Dániel Bereczki	6	0	4	0	2	0
24	MF	(Serbia) SRB	Danilo Sekulić	5	2	2	0	3	2
25	FW	(Switzerland) SUI	Haris Tabaković	25	13	20	12	5	1
27	MF	(Hungary) HUN	Ádám Bódi	27	4	23	4	4	0
29	MF	(Hungary) HUN	Erik Kusnyír	8	0	5	0	3	0
33	MF	(Hungary) HUN	Richárd Csősz	16	0	11	0	5	0
42	FW	(Hungary) HUN	Norbert Könyves	31	10	28	8	3	2
70	MF	(Hungary) HUN	Kevin Nagy	9	1	4	0	5	1
77	MF	(Bosnia and Herzegovina) BIH	Aleksandar Jovanović	33	2	27	2	6	0
86	GK	(Slovakia) SVK	Tomáš Košický	6	-11	1	-4	5	-7
99	MF	(Hungary) HUN	Bence Sós	25	5	20	3	5	2
Youth players:
18	FW	(Hungary) HUN	Donát Bárány	1	2	0	0	1	2
Players no longer at the club:
5	DF	(Hungary) HUN	Péter Szilvási	3	0	1	0	2	0
10	MF	(Hungary) HUN	Dávid Holman	5	0	5	0	0	0
12	GK	(Slovakia) SVK	Ján Novota	4	-6	1	-3	3	-3

=== Top scorers ===
Includes all competitive matches. The list is sorted by shirt number when total goals are equal.

Last updated on 2 June 2018

Position	Nation	Number	Name	OTP Bank Liga	Hungarian Cup	Total
1	(Switzerland)	25	Haris Tabaković	12	1	13
2	(Hungary)	20	Tamás Takács	9	2	11
3	(Hungary)	42	Norbert Könyves	8	2	10
4	(Hungary)	10	Tibor Tisza	0	8	8
5	(Hungary)	8	Dániel Tőzsér	6	0	6
6	(Cameroon)	19	Justin Mengolo	4	1	5
7	(Hungary)	99	Bence Sós	3	2	5
8	(Hungary)	27	Ádám Bódi	4	0	4
9	(Hungary)	21	Kevin Varga	3	0	3
10	(Bosnia and Herzegovina)	77	Aleksandar Jovanović	2	0	2
11	(Hungary)	18	Donát Bárány	0	2	2
12	(Serbia)	24	Danilo Sekulić	0	2	2
13	(Hungary)	2	Ákos Kinyik	0	2	2
14	(Hungary)	11	János Ferenczi	1	0	1
15	(Hungary)	3	Csaba Szatmári	1	0	1
16	(Hungary)	70	Kevin Nagy	0	1	1
17	(Hungary)	16	Péter Bíró	0	1	1
/	/	/	Own Goals	0	1	1
			TOTALS	53	25	78

=== Disciplinary record ===
Includes all competitive matches. Players with 1 card or more included only.

Last updated on 2 June 2018

Position	Nation	Number	Name	OTP Bank Liga		Hungarian Cup		Total (Hu Total)	
Position	Nation	Number	Name	Booked	Sent off (straight red)	Booked	Sent off (straight red)	Booked	Sent off (straight red)
GK	(Ukraine)	1	Oleksandr Nad	4	0	0	0	4 (4)	0 (0)
DF	(Hungary)	2	Ákos Kinyik	6	0	1	1	7 (6)	1 (0)
DF	(Hungary)	3	Csaba Szatmári	6	0	1	0	7 (6)	0 (0)
MF	(Romania)	4	Ioan Filip	2	0	2	0	4 (2)	0 (0)
DF	(Hungary)	6	Balázs Bényei	5	0	1	0	6 (5)	0 (0)
MF	(Hungary)	8	Dániel Tőzsér	9	0	1	0	10 (9)	0 (0)
MF	(Hungary)	11	János Ferenczi	3	1	0	0	3 (3)	1 (1)
DF	(Hungary)	14	Krisztián Kuti	1	0	0	0	1 (1)	0 (0)
DF	(Hungary)	15	Szabolcs Barna	2	0	0	0	2 (2)	0 (0)
MF	(Cameroon)	19	Justin Mengolo	3	0	0	0	3 (3)	0 (0)
FW	(Hungary)	20	Tamás Takács	4	0	1	0	5 (4)	0 (0)
MF	(Hungary)	21	Kevin Varga	8	0	0	0	8 (8)	0 (0)
FW	(Switzerland)	25	Haris Tabaković	3	0	0	0	3 (3)	0 (0)
MF	(Hungary)	27	Ádám Bódi	2	0	1	0	3 (2)	0 (0)
MF	(Hungary)	29	Erik Kusnyír	2	0	0	0	2 (2)	0 (0)
MF	(Hungary)	33	Richárd Csősz	0	0	1	0	1 (0)	0 (0)
FW	(Hungary)	42	Norbert Könyves	4	0	0	0	4 (4)	0 (0)
MF	(Bosnia and Herzegovina)	77	Aleksandar Jovanović	4	1	0	0	4 (4)	1 (1)
MF	(Hungary)	99	Bence Sós	1	0	0	0	1 (1)	0 (0)
			TOTALS	69	2	9	1	78 (69)	3 (2)

=== Overall ===
Games played	42 (33 OTP Bank Liga and 9 Hungarian Cup)
Games won	18 (12 OTP Bank Liga and 6 Hungarian Cup)
Games drawn	9 (8 OTP Bank Liga and 1 Hungarian Cup)
Games lost	15 (13 OTP Bank Liga and 2 Hungarian Cup)
Goals scored	78
Goals conceded	59
Goal difference	+19
Yellow cards	78
Red cards	3
Worst discipline	(Hungary) Dániel Tőzsér (10 (yellow card) , 0 (red card) )
Best result	10–1 (A) v Csongrád - Magyar Kupa - 20-09-2017
Worst result	0–4 (A) v Puskás Akadémia - Magyar Kupa - 18-04-2018
Worst result	0–4 (A) v Balmazújváros - Nemzeti Bajnokság I - 19-05-2018
Most appearances	(Hungary) Dániel Tőzsér (37 appearances)
Top scorer	(Switzerland) Haris Tabaković (13 goals)
Points	63/126 (50.0%)

Last updated: 2 June 2018
