= 2015–16 Debreceni VSC season =

Debrecen
2015–16 season
- Manager: Elemér Kondás
- Stadium: Nagyerdei Stadion
- Nemzeti Bajnokság I: 3rd
- Magyar Kupa: Semi-finals
- UEFA Europa League: Third qualifying round
- Top goalscorer: League: Zsolt Horváth; Tibor Tisza (6 each); All: Tibor Tisza (10)
- Highest home attendance: 10,532 v Rosenborg (30 July 2015, UEFA Europa League)
- Lowest home attendance: 500 v Szeged (18 November 2015, Magyar Kupa)
- Average home league attendance: 3,010
- Biggest win: 9–2 v Skonto (Home, 23 July 2015, UEFA Europa League); 7–0 v Békéscsaba (Home, 17 October 2015, Nemzeti Bajnokság I)
- Biggest defeat: 0–3 v Ferencváros (Home, 22 August 2015, Nemzeti Bajnokság I); 0–3 v Ferencváros (Away, 28 November 2015, Nemzeti Bajnokság I); 0–3 v Honvéd (Home, 12 March 2016, Nemzeti Bajnokság I); 0–3 v Ferencváros (Away, 13 April 2016, Magyar Kupa)

The 2015–16 season was Debreceni Vasutas Sport Club's 42nd competitive season, 23rd consecutive season in the Nemzeti Bajnokság I and 103rd season in existence as a football club. In addition to the domestic league, Debrecen participated in that season's editions of the Magyar Kupa and the UEFA Europa League.

== Squad ==
Squad at end of season

Note: Flags indicate national team as defined under FIFA eligibility rules; some limited exceptions apply. Players may hold more than one non-FIFA nationality.

No.	Pos.	Nation	Player
1	GK	(Hungary) HUN	Balázs Slakta
3	DF	(Hungary) HUN	Csaba Szatmári
8	MF	(Hungary) HUN	Dávid Holman
11	MF	(Hungary) HUN	János Ferenczi
12	GK	(Hungary) HUN	Miklós Erdélyi
13	DF	(Hungary) HUN	Pál Lázár
14	DF	(Hungary) HUN	Krisztián Kuti
16	MF	(Bosnia and Herzegovina) BIH	Ognjen Đelmić
17	DF	(Hungary) HUN	Norbert Mészáros
18	DF	(Hungary) HUN	Péter Máté
19	DF	(Hungary) HUN	Szabolcs Barna
20	FW	(Hungary) HUN	Tamás Takács
21	MF	(Hungary) HUN	Bence Ludánszki
22	GK	(Croatia) CRO	Božidar Radošević
23	FW	(Hungary) HUN	Dániel Bereczki
25	DF	(Serbia) SRB	Dušan Brković

No.	Pos.	Nation	Player
26	FW	(Senegal) SEN	Ibrahima Sidibe
27	MF	(Hungary) HUN	Ádám Bódi
28	DF	(Hungary) HUN	Zoltán Nagy
30	GK	(Hungary) HUN	János Balogh
33	MF	(Hungary) HUN	József Varga
37	DF	(Hungary) HUN	Ákos Kinyik
39	FW	(France) FRA	Adamo Coulibaly
44	FW	(Hungary) HUN	Tibor Tisza
53	DF	(Hungary) HUN	Péter Berdó
55	MF	(Hungary) HUN	Péter Szakály
69	DF	(Hungary) HUN	Mihály Korhut
70	FW	(Hungary) HUN	Tamás Kulcsár
77	MF	(Serbia) SRB	Aleksandar Jovanović
87	GK	(Hungary) HUN	István Verpecz
88	FW	(Hungary) HUN	Zsolt Horváth

== Transfers ==
=== Transfers in ===
Transfer window	Pos.	No.	Player	From
Summer	DF	5	(Hungary) Péter Szilvási	Free agent (Note: Previous club Greuther Fürth II.)
Summer	GK	22	(Croatia) Božidar Radošević	Free agent (Note: Previous club Balmazújváros.)
Summer	GK	30	(Hungary) János Balogh	Free agent (Note: Previous club Nyíregyháza.)
Summer	FW	88	(Hungary) Zsolt Horváth	Free agent (Note: Previous club MTK.)
Summer	FW	91	(Netherlands) Geoffrey Castillion	(Romania) Universitatea Cluj
Winter	MF	8	(Hungary) Dávid Holman	Ferencváros
Winter	MF	16	(Bosnia and Herzegovina) Ognjen Đelmić	Free agent (Note: Previous club Željezničar.)
Winter	FW	20	(Hungary) Tamás Takács	Diósgyőr

=== Transfers out ===
Transfer window	Pos.	No.	Player	To
Summer	FW	–	(Hungary) Ádám Kovács	Released
Summer	DF	–	(Hungary) Martin Króner	Zalaegerszeg
Summer	GK	–	(Hungary) Gergő Szécsi	Balmazújváros
Summer	MF	8	(France) Selim Bouadla	Released (Note: Joined Académica de Coimbra.)
Summer	MF	10	(Slovenia) Rene Mihelič	(Israel) Hapoel Ra'anana
Summer	FW	20	(Hungary) Dávid Wittrédi	Released (Note: Joined Kozármisleny.)
Summer	DF	24	(Hungary) Dániel Böszörményi	Released
Summer	DF	24	(Estonia) Igor Morozov	Released
Winter	MF	6	(Hungary) László Zsidai	Puskás Akadémia
Winter	FW	16	(Hungary) Norbert Balogh	(Italy) Palermo
Winter	FW	66	(Hungary) Márk Szécsi	Nyíregyháza

=== Loans in ===
Transfer window	Pos.	No.	Player	From	End date

=== Loans out ===
Transfer window	Pos.	No.	Player	To	End date
Summer	FW	–	(Hungary) Tamás Kertész	Békéscsaba	Middle of season
Summer	MF	–	(Hungary) Tamás Sándor	Balmazújváros	Middle of season
Winter	DF	5	(Hungary) Péter Szilvási	Mezőkövesd	End of season
Winter	FW	15	(Hungary) Bence Sós	Mezőkövesd	End of season
Winter	FW	91	(Netherlands) Geoffrey Castillion	Puskás Akadémia	End of season

== Competitions ==
=== Overview ===
Competition	First match	Last match	Starting round	Final position	Record							
Competition	First match	Last match	Starting round	Final position	Pld	W	D	L	GF	GA	GD	Win %
Nemzeti Bajnokság I	19 July 2015	30 April 2016	Matchday 1	3rd	33	14	11	8	48	34	+14	42.42
Magyar Kupa	14 October 2015	13 April 2016	Round of 32	Semi-finals	7	4	2	1	13	4	+9	57.14
UEFA Europa League	2 July 2015	6 August 2015	First qualifying round	Third qualifying round	6	2	1	3	17	12	+5	33.33
Total					46	20	14	12	78	50	+28	43.48

Source: Competitions

=== Nemzeti Bajnokság I ===
==== League table ====
Pos	Team	Pld	W	D	L	GF	GA	GD	Pts	Qualification or relegation
1	Ferencváros (C)	33	24	4	5	69	23	+46	76	Qualification for the Champions League second qualifying round
2	Videoton	33	17	4	12	42	29	+13	55	Qualification for the Europa League first qualifying round (Note: Since the winners of the 2015–16 Magyar Kupa, Ferencváros, qualified for European competition based on league position, the spot awarded to the cup winners (Europa League first qualifying round) was passed to the fourth-placed team.)
3	Debrecen	33	14	11	8	48	34	+14	53	Qualification for the Europa League first qualifying round
4	MTK Budapest	33	14	9	10	39	37	+2	51	Qualification for the Europa League first qualifying round
5	Haladás	33	13	11	9	33	37	−4	50	

Source: Soccerway
Rules for classification: 1) Points; 2) Matches won; 3) Goal difference; 4) Goals scored; 5) Head-to-head points; 6) Head-to-head goal difference; 7) Head-to-head away goals scored; 8) Fairplay; 9) Draw.
(C) Champions

==== Results summary ====
Overall								Home						Away					
Pld	W	D	L	GF	GA	GD	Pts	W	D	L	GF	GA	GD	W	D	L	GF	GA	GD
33	14	11	8	48	34	+14	53	10	3	4	31	16	+15	4	8	4	17	18	−1

Source: Hungarian Football Federation

==== Results by round ====
Round	1	2	3	4	5	6	7	8	9	10	11	12	13	14	15	16	17	18	19	20	21	22	23	24	25	26	27	28	29	30	31	32	33
Ground	A	H	A	H	A	H	A	H	A	A	H	H	A	H	A	H	A	H	H	H	H	A	H	A	H	A	A	H	A	H	A	H	A
Result	W	D	D	L	W	L	L	W	W	D	D	W	D	D	D	W	L	L	W	W	W	D	W	D	L	L	W	W	L	W	D	W	D
Position	2	5	4	7	4	8	8	6	4	5	6	2	5	5	5	4	5	7	7	5	3	3	2	3	4	5	3	3	3	3	4	3	3
Points	3	4	5	5	8	8	8	11	14	15	16	19	20	21	22	25	25	25	28	31	34	35	38	39	39	39	42	45	45	48	49	50	51

Source: Matches
A = Away; H = Home; W = Win; D = Draw; L = Loss

==== Matches ====
19 July 2015 1	Békéscsaba	2–3	Debrecen	Békéscsaba
18:00 CEST (UTC+2)	Laczkó 14'; Viczián 36', (yellow card) 59'; Borbély (yellow card) 70'; Punoševac (yellow card) 85'; Balog (yellow card) 90+1'	Report	Nagy 20'; Tisza 68'; Bényei 90+1' (o.g.)	Stadium: Kórház utcai Stadion; Attendance: 3,700; Referee: Csaba Pintér; Assistant referees: Gábor Erős, Krisztián Király; Fourth official: Zoltán Bozó; Goal-line assistants: Ádám Németh, Katalin Kulcsár

26 July 2015 2	Debrecen	1–1	Puskás Akadémia	Debrecen
18:00 CEST (UTC+2)	Castillion 30'; Morozov (yellow card) 63'	Report	Pekár 56'; Fiola (yellow card) 73'	Stadium: Nagyerdei Stadion; Attendance: 3,245; Referee: Tamás Bognár; Assistant referees: Vencel Tóth II, Balázs Buzás; Fourth official: Zsolt Szpisják; Goal-line assistants: Ádám Németh, Gábor Oláh

2 August 2015 3	Honvéd	3–3	Debrecen	Budapest
18:00 CEST (UTC+2)	Zsidai 11' (o.g.); Botka 40'; Holender 48'; Gazdag (yellow card) 69'	Report	Zsidai (yellow card) 27'; Castillion 43', (yellow card) 57'; Varga (yellow card) 49'; Tisza (yellow card) 62', (goal) 90+3'; N. Balogh 63'	Stadium: Bozsik József Stadion; Attendance: 2,700; Referee: Sándor Andó-Szabó; Assistant referees: László Viszokai, Oszkár Lémon; Fourth official: Tamás Márkus; Goal-line assistants: Ferenc Karakó, Gyöngyi Gaál

9 August 2015 4	Debrecen	0–1	Haladás	Debrecen
20:15 CEST (UTC+2)	Jovanović (yellow card) 87'; Zsidai (yellow card) 90+4'	Report	T. Wils (yellow card) 20'; Halmosi 52'	Stadium: Nagyerdei Stadion; Attendance: 3,418; Referee: István Vad; Assistant referees: György Ring, János Medovarszki; Fourth official: Zsolt Szpisják; Goal-line assistants: Viktor Kassai, János Takács

15 August 2015 5	Diósgyőr	0–2	Debrecen	Miskolc
18:00 CEST (UTC+2)	Lipták (yellow card) 25'; Barczi (yellow card) 29'	Report	Máté 48'; N. Balogh 62'; Jovanović (yellow card) 82'	Stadium: Diósgyőri Stadion; Attendance: 2,705; Referee: Sándor Andó-Szabó; Assistant referees: Balázs Buzás, Georgiou Theodoros; Fourth official: István Albert; Goal-line assistants: Ádám Farkas, J. Zoltán Kovács

22 August 2015 6	Debrecen	0–3	Ferencváros	Debrecen
20:30 CEST (UTC+2)	Máté (yellow card) 17'; Szécsi (yellow card) 33'; J. Varga (yellow card) 74'	Report	Böde 12'; Busai (yellow card) 43'; Šesták 66'; Radó 70'; Čukić (yellow card) 81'	Stadium: Nagyerdei Stadion; Attendance: 6,241; Referee: Zsolt Szabó; Assistant referees: György Ring, László Viszokai; Fourth official: János Medovarszki; Goal-line assistants: Ádám Németh, Ferenc Karakó

30 August 2015 7	Videoton	1–0	Debrecen	Székesfehérvár
19:00 CEST (UTC+2)	Oliveira (yellow card) 43', (goal) 90+1'; Heffler (yellow card) 48'; Kovács (yellow card) 88'; Danilović (yellow card) 90+2'	Report	Varga (yellow card) 71'; Bódi (yellow card) 85'	Stadium: Sóstói Stadion; Attendance: 2,147; Referee: István Vad; Assistant referees: István Albert, János Medovarszki; Fourth official: Gábor Takács; Goal-line assistants: Sándor Andó-Szabó, Szabolcs Szilasi

12 September 2015 8	Debrecen	1–0	MTK	Debrecen
18:00 CEST (UTC+2)	Sidibe 3', (yellow card) 65'; N. Balogh (red card) 71'	Report	Vukmir (yellow card) 1'; Hrepka (yellow card) 36'; Grgić (yellow card) 55'; Torghelle (yellow card) 84'; Vass (yellow card) 86'; Gera (red card) 90'; Bese (yellow card) 90+3'	Stadium: Nagyerdei Stadion; Attendance: 2,159; Referee: Tamás Bognár; Assistant referees: László Viszokai, Gábor Erős; Fourth official: Oszkár Lémon; Goal-line assistants: Zsolt Szabó, Katalin Kulcsár

19 September 2015 9	Vasas	0–1	Debrecen	Budapest
18:00 CEST (UTC+2)	Vukasović (yellow card) 20'; Adamović (yellow card) 40'; Pajović (yellow card) 72'; Ádám (yellow card) 87'	Report	Ferenczi (yellow card) 41'; Castillion (yellow card) 72'; Kulcsár 77'	Stadium: Illovszky Rudolf Stadion; Attendance: 2,850; Referee: Csaba Pintér; Assistant referees: Dr. Zsolt Varga, Tamás Márkus; Fourth official: Balázs Huszár; Goal-line assistants: Zsolt Szabó, Attila Molnár

26 September 2015 10	Paks	1–1	Debrecen	Paks
18:00 CEST (UTC+2)	Szabó (yellow card) 14'; Bartha 18'; Kecskés (yellow card) 41'; Balázs (yellow card) 45'; Lenzsér (yellow card) 60'	Report	Korhut (yellow card) 11'; Zsidai (yellow card) 50'; Tisza 63'; N. Balogh (yellow card) 80'	Stadium: Fehérvári úti Stadion; Attendance: 865; Referee: István Vad; Assistant referees: György Ring, László Viszokai; Fourth official: Gábor Kormányos II; Goal-line assistants: Ádám Farkas, Katalin Kulcsár

3 October 2015 11	Debrecen	1–1	Újpest	Debrecen
18:00 CEST (UTC+2)	Tisza 28'; Brković (yellow card) 78'	Report	Diagne 32'; Bardhi (yellow card) 72'; Nagy (yellow card) 76'	Stadium: Nagyerdei Stadion; Attendance: 4,052; Referee: Ádám Farkas; Assistant referees: Oszkár Lémon, Attila Kelemen; Fourth official: Gábor Varga Jr. Goal-line assistants: Ádám Németh, Róbert Nagy

17 October 2015 12	Debrecen	7–0	Békéscsaba	Debrecen
18:00 CEST (UTC+2)	Kulcsár 32', 68'; Sidibe 52'; N. Balogh 54'; Tisza 63'; Zsidai 76'; Jovanović 81'	Report	Borbély (yellow card) 42'; Guarú (yellow card) 58'; Calvente (yellow card) 65'; Vaskó (red card) 70'	Stadium: Nagyerdei Stadion; Attendance: 2,282; Referee: Szabolcs Szilasi; Assistant referees: Dániel Szalai, Gábor Varga Jr. Fourth official: Attila Kelemen; Goal-line assistants: Balázs Berke, János Takács

24 October 2015 13	Puskás Akadémia	1–1	Debrecen	Felcsút
15:30 CEST (UTC+2)	Pauljević (yellow card) 6'; Fiola (yellow card) 63'; Lencse 81'; Kocsis (yellow card) 90+3'	Report	Máté (yellow card) 38'; N. Balogh (yellow card) 64'; Sidibe (yellow card) 65'; Korhut 87'	Stadium: Pancho Aréna; Attendance: 1,513; Referee: Sándor Andó-Szabó; Assistant referees: Gábor Erős, Balázs Farkas; Fourth official: Gábor Takács; Goal-line assistants: Tamás Bognár, Gyöngyi Gaál

31 October 2015 14	Debrecen	0–0	Honvéd	Debrecen
16:00 CET (UTC+1)	Korhut (yellow card) 3'	Report	Szilágyi (yellow card) 11'; Lovrić (yellow card) 31'; G. Nagy (yellow card) 45'	Stadium: Nagyerdei Stadion; Attendance: 2,746; Referee: Ádám Németh; Assistant referees: János Medovarszki, Gábor Kormányos II; Fourth official: Dr. Zsolt Varga; Goal-line assistants: Ádám Radványi, Eszter Urbán

21 November 2015 16	Debrecen	1–0	Diósgyőr	Debrecen
15:30 CET (UTC+1)	Sidibe 23'; Nagy (yellow card) 31'; Jovanović (yellow card) 45'; Szakály (yellow card) 90+3'	Report	Grumić (yellow card) 33'; Egerszegi (yellow card) 85'	Stadium: Nagyerdei Stadion; Attendance: 2,615; Referee: Zoltán Iványi; Assistant referees: Balázs Buzás, Krisztián Király; Fourth official: Dániel Szalai; Goal-line assistants: Tamás Bognár, Eszter Urbán

28 November 2015 17	Ferencváros	3–0	Debrecen	Budapest
18:00 CET (UTC+1)	Ramírez 66'; Gera 78'; R. Varga (yellow card) 85'; Radó 87'	Report	Szakály (yellow card) 74'	Stadium: Groupama Aréna; Attendance: 6,642; Referee: Viktor Kassai; Assistant referees: Gábor Erős, László Viszokai; Fourth official: György Ring; Goal-line assistants: Sándor Andó-Szabó, Gergely Szőts

2 December 2015 15	Haladás	2–2	Debrecen	Szombathely
18:30 CET (UTC+1)	P. Nagy (yellow card) 26'; Halmosi (yellow card) 56'; Martínez 58'; Németh 78'	Report	Bódi (yellow card) 12'; Brković (yellow card) 51', (goal) 54'; Lázár (yellow card) 60'; Gaál 86' (o.g.)	Stadium: Rohonci út Attendance: 1,866; Referee: József Erdős; Assistant referees: György Ring, Gábor Takács; Fourth official: Zoltán Horváth; Goal-line assistants: Szabolcs Szilasi, Balázs Berke
Note: The matches of the 15th round were originally scheduled for 7 November 2015, but were postponed due to HFF decision to rest players before the UEFA Euro 2016 qualifying play-offs against Norway by the request of Bernd Storck.

5 December 2015 18	Debrecen	1–2	Videoton	Debrecen
18:30 CET (UTC+1)	Korhut (yellow card) 10', (goal) 62'; Sidibe (yellow card) 25'; Zsidai (yellow card) 59'	Report	Gyurcsó 31'; Feczesin (yellow card) 44'; Kovács 69'	Stadium: Nagyerdei Stadion; Attendance: 1,656; Referee: István Vad; Assistant referees: Vencel Tóth II, János Medovarszki; Fourth official: Balázs Farkas; Goal-line assistants: Zoltán Iványi, Róbert Nagy

12 December 2015 19	Debrecen	3–1	MTK	Debrecen
15:30 CET (UTC+1)	Horváth 13', 55', 72'; Brković (yellow card) 81'	Report	Ramos 90+1'	Stadium: Nagyerdei Stadion; Attendance: 1,285; Referee: Ádám Farkas; Assistant referees: Dr. Zsolt Varga, Tamás Márkus; Fourth official: János Demeter; Goal-line assistants: Ádám Radványi, Róbert Nagy

13 February 2016 20	Debrecen	4–0	Vasas	Debrecen
15:30 CET (UTC+1)	Bódi 5'; Horváth 26'; Holman 35'; Sidibe 49'	Report	Debreceni (yellow card) 73'	Stadium: Nagyerdei Stadion; Attendance: 2,124; Referee: József Erdős; Assistant referees: Gábor Erős, Gábor Kormányos II; Fourth official: János Medovarszki; Goal-line assistants: Tamás Bognár, Katalin Kulcsár

20 February 2016 21	Debrecen	2–0	Paks	Debrecen
15:30 CET (UTC+1)	Sidibe 21' (pen.); Lázár (yellow card) 35'; Holman 44'; Jovanović (yellow card) 70'	Report	Papp (yellow card) 11'; Szakály (yellow card) 88'	Stadium: Nagyerdei Stadion; Attendance: 2,518; Referee: Zoltán Iványi; Assistant referees: Balázs Buzás, Gábor Varga Jr. Fourth official: Tamás Márkus; Goal-line assistants: Ferenc Karakó, Eszter Urbán

27 February 2016 22	Újpest	1–1	Debrecen	Budapest
15:30 CET (UTC+1)	Windecker (yellow card) 23'; Lencse 86'	Report	Szakály 37'; Bódi (red card) 85'	Stadium: Szusza Ferenc Stadion; Attendance: 3,347; Referee: Ádám Farkas; Assistant referees: Krisztián Király, Tamás Márkus; Fourth official: Zsolt Szpisják; Goal-line assistants: János Takács, Róbert Nagy

5 March 2016 23	Debrecen	4–2	Puskás Akadémia	Debrecen
18:00 CET (UTC+1)	Takács 12'; Szakály 19', (yellow card) 49'; Horváth 20', 54', (yellow card) 54'; Korhut (yellow card) 45'	Report	Churko 8'; Mészáros 24'; Lyopa (yellow card) 47'	Stadium: Nagyerdei Stadion; Attendance: 2,311; Referee: József Erdős; Assistant referees: Vencel Tóth II, István Albert; Fourth official: János Medovarszki; Goal-line assistants: Csaba Pintér, Eszter Urbán

8 March 2016 24	Vasas	0–0	Debrecen	Budapest
18:00 CET (UTC+1)	Novák (yellow card) 7'; Hangya (yellow card) 83'; Ristevski (yellow card) 86'	Report	Takács (red card) 59'	Stadium: Illovszky Rudolf Stadion; Attendance: 1,100; Referee: Ádám Németh; Assistant referees: Krisztián Király, Balázs Huszár; Fourth official: Zoltán Bozó; Goal-line assistants: József Erdős, Eszter Urbán

12 March 2016 25	Debrecen	0–3	Honvéd	Debrecen
15:30 CET (UTC+1)	Holman (yellow card) 77'	Report	Eppel 4', 26'; Botka (yellow card) 23'; Hidi 38'; G. Nagy (yellow card) 67'	Stadium: Nagyerdei Stadion; Attendance: 2,327; Referee: Viktor Kassai; Assistant referees: Zoltán Bozó, Dr. Zsolt Varga; Fourth official: Gábor Kormányos II; Goal-line assistants: Ferenc Karakó, Gergely Szőts

20 March 2016 26	MTK	1–0	Debrecen	Budapest (Note: The match was played at the Illovszky Rudolf Stadion in Budapest, instead of MTK regular stadium, the Hidegkuti Nándor Stadion in Budapest, built in 1947 which was demolished to make way to the newly built Hidegkuti Nándor Stadion.)
15:15 CET (UTC+1)	Nikač 63'; Thiam (yellow card) 72'	Report	Szakály (yellow card) 37'; Tisza (yellow card) 73'; Korhut (yellow card) 74'	Stadium: Illovszky Rudolf Stadion; Attendance: 634; Referee: Tamás Bognár; Assistant referees: Gábor Takács, Zoltán Horváth; Fourth official: Zsolt Szpisják; Goal-line assistants: Ádám Farkas, József Erdős

2 April 2016 28	Debrecen	2–1	Ferencváros	Debrecen
18:30 CEST (UTC+2)	Takács 28', 30'; Jovanović (yellow card) 42'; J. Varga (yellow card) 50'; Ferenczi (yellow card) 89'; Tisza (yellow card) 90+1'	Report	Šesták 62'; Nalepa (yellow card) 88'; Dilaver (yellow card) 89'; Lamah (yellow card) 90+1'; Ramírez (red card) 90+1'	Stadium: Nagyerdei Stadion; Attendance: 5,658; Referee: Ádám Farkas; Assistant referees: György Ring, Gábor Varga Jr. Fourth official: Krisztián Király; Goal-line assistants: Ádám Németh, Ádám Radványi

5 April 2016 29	Videoton	1–0	Debrecen	Felcsút (Note: The match was played at the Pancho Aréna in Felcsút, instead of Videoton regular stadium, the Sóstói Stadion in Székesfehérvár, built in 1967 which was demolished to make way to the newly built Sóstói Stadion.)
18:00 CEST (UTC+2)	Pölöskei (yellow card) 35'; Feczesin 37'; Stopira (yellow card) 54'; Simon (yellow card) 64'	Report	Brković (red card) 31'; Szakály (yellow card) 88'; Bódi (yellow card) 90'	Stadium: Pancho Aréna; Attendance: 1,006; Referee: Zsolt Szabó; Assistant referees: Gábor Erős, Krisztián Király; Fourth official: Dániel Szalai; Goal-line assistants: Ferenc Karakó, János Takács

9 April 2016 27	Paks	0–1	Debrecen	Paks
20:45 CEST (UTC+2)	Bartha (yellow card) 67'; Bajner (yellow card) 79'	Report	Szabó 28' (o.g.); Lázár (yellow card) 39'; Máté (yellow card) 40'; Bódi (yellow card) 60'	Stadium: Fehérvári úti Stadion; Attendance: 835; Referee: Ádám Németh; Assistant referees: Vencel Tóth II, Balázs Farkas; Fourth official: Krisztián Király; Goal-line assistants: Viktor Kassai, Gergely Szőts
Note: The matches of the 27th round were originally scheduled for 30 March 2016, but were postponed to ease the pressure on the tight schedule.

16 April 2016 30	Debrecen	1–0	Újpest	Debrecen
18:00 CEST (UTC+2)	Máté (yellow card) 23'; Bódi (yellow card) 44'; Tisza 82'	Report	Litauszki (yellow card) 85'	Stadium: Nagyerdei Stadion; Attendance: 3,247; Referee: István Vad; Assistant referees: Attila Kelemen, Tamás Márkus; Fourth official: Gergely Becséri; Goal-line assistants: Gábor Oláh, Róbert Nagy

20 April 2016 31	Haladás	2–2	Debrecen	Sopron (Note: The match was played at the Káposztás utcai Stadion in Sopron, instead of Haladás regular stadium, the Rohonci út in Szombathely, which was demolished to make way to the newly built Haladás Sportkomplexum.)
18:00 CEST (UTC+2)	Gaál 28'; Halmosi 59'; Németh (yellow card) 72'; Iszlai (yellow card) 75'	Report	Máté (yellow card) 12'; Jovanović 51', (yellow card) 74'; Takács 67'; Brković (yellow card) 90+3'	Stadium: Káposztás utcai Stadion; Attendance: 1,327; Referee: József Erdős; Assistant referees: Oszkár Lémon, Gábor Takács; Fourth official: Dániel Szalai; Goal-line assistants: Zsolt Szabó, Szabolcs Szilasi

23 April 2016 32	Debrecen	3–1	Diósgyőr	Debrecen
18:00 CEST (UTC+2)	Jovanović 13', (yellow card) 55'; Takács 19'; Bódi 69'; Kulcsár (yellow card) 90+1'; Korhut (yellow card) 90+2'	Report	Okuka (yellow card) 33'; Egerszegi 43'; James (yellow card) 45'; Nemes (yellow card) 67'; Novothny (yellow card) 83'; Lipták (yellow card) 90+2'	Stadium: Nagyerdei Stadion; Attendance: 3,286; Referee: Zsolt Szabó; Assistant referees: Zoltán Bozó, Gergely Becséri; Fourth official: Gábor Erős; Goal-line assistants: Balázs Berke, János Takács

30 April 2016 33	Békéscsaba	0–0	Debrecen	Békéscsaba
16:30 CEST (UTC+2)	Juhász (yellow card) 57'; Punoševac (yellow card) 70'; Vaskó (yellow card) 76'	Report	Jovanović (yellow card) 34'; Brković (yellow card) 56'; Korhut (yellow card) 59'; Varga (yellow card) 65'; Lázár (yellow card) 90+3'	Stadium: Kórház utcai Stadion; Attendance: 942; Referee: Ádám Németh; Assistant referees: Dr. Zsolt Varga, Tamás Márkus; Fourth official: Gergely Becséri; Goal-line assistants: Ádám Farkas, Gábor Oláh

=== Magyar Kupa ===
14 October 2015 Round of 32	Géderlak	0–3	Debrecen	Géderlak
14:00 CEST (UTC+2)		Report	Sós 21', 61'; Castillion 86'	Stadium: Géderlak Sporttelep; Attendance: 1,000; Referee: Béla Botló; Assistant referees: Gábor Kormányos II, István Iványi

==== Round of 16 ====
28 October 2015 First leg	Szeged	0–0	Debrecen	Gyula
13:30 CET (UTC+1)		Report	Kinyik (yellow card) 84'	Stadium: Grosics Gyula Labdarúgó Akadémia; Attendance: 450; Referee: Tibor Gyarmati II; Assistant referees: Gábor Kormányos II, János Medovarszki; Fourth official: Tamás Takács

18 November 2015 Second leg	Debrecen	3–0 (3–0 agg.)	Szeged	Debrecen
13:00 CET (UTC+1)	Farkas 24' (o.g.); Szécsi 43'; Horváth 87'	Report	Király (yellow card) 62'	Stadium: Nagyerdei Stadion; Attendance: 500; Referee: Ferenc Karakó; Assistant referees: István Albert, Zsolt Szpisják; Fourth official: János Takács
Note: Debrecen won 3–0 on aggregate.

==== Quarter-finals ====
9 February 2016 First leg	Nyíregyháza	1–2	Debrecen	Nyíregyháza
18:00 CET (UTC+1)	Rezes 25'; Harsányi (yellow card) 54'; Törtei (yellow card) 61'; Rubus (red card) 81'	Report	Brković 38'; Szakály (yellow card) 66'; Ferenczi 90'	Stadium: Városi Stadion; Attendance: 2,116; Referee: Tamás Bognár; Assistant referees: Oszkár Lémon, Balázs Buzás; Fourth official: László Lovas

1 March 2016 Second leg	Debrecen	5–0 (7–1 agg.)	Nyíregyháza	Debrecen
18:00 CET (UTC+1)	Takács 16', 37', 51'; Tisza 71'; Đelmić 85'	Report		Stadium: Nagyerdei Stadion; Attendance: 2,235; Referee: István Vad; Assistant referees: Zoltán Bozó, Balázs Farkas; Fourth official: Ádám Radványi
Note: Debrecen won 7–1 on aggregate.

==== Semi-finals ====
16 March 2016 First leg	Debrecen	0–0	Ferencváros	Debrecen
18:00 CET (UTC+1)	Holman (yellow card) 26'; Szakály (yellow card) 59'; J. Varga (yellow card) 81'; Jovanović (yellow card) 83'	Report	Gera (yellow card) 27'; Ramírez (yellow card) 73'	Stadium: Nagyerdei Stadion; Attendance: 4,208; Referee: Zoltán Iványi; Assistant referees: Balázs Buzás, János Medovarszki; Fourth official: Gábor Varga Jr. Goal-line assistants: Ádám Farkas, Balázs Berke

13 April 2016 Second leg	Ferencváros	3–0 (3–0 agg.)	Debrecen	Budapest
18:00 CEST (UTC+2)	Gera 22', 79'; Gyömbér (yellow card) 75'; Nagy 90'	Report	Verpecz (red card) 19'; Holman (yellow card) 58'; Brković (yellow card) 78'; Korhut (yellow card) 83'; Jovanović (yellow card) 87'	Stadium: Groupama Aréna; Attendance: 5,835; Referee: Ferenc Karakó; Assistant referees: Gábor Erős, Georgiou Theodoros; Fourth official: Oszkár Lémon; Goal-line assistants: József Erdős, Csaba Pintér
Note: Ferencváros won 3–0 on aggregate.

=== UEFA Europa League ===
==== Qualifying rounds ====
===== First qualifying round =====
2 July 2015 First leg	Debrecen (Hungary)	3–0	(Montenegro) Sutjeska	Debrecen, Hungary
18:30 CEST (UTC+2)	Mihelič 16'; Brković (yellow card) 63', (goal) 71'; Sidibe 74'	Report	Ognjanović (yellow card) 47'; Šofranac (yellow card) 90+2'	Stadium: Nagyerdei Stadion; Attendance: 5,744; Referee: Raymond Crangle (Northern Ireland); Assistant referees: Andrew Neeson (Northern Ireland), James Eakin (Northern Ireland); Fourth official: Evan Boyce (Northern Ireland)

9 July 2015 Second leg	Sutjeska (Montenegro)	2–0 (2–3 agg.)	(Hungary) Debrecen	Nikšić, Montenegro
17:30 CEST (UTC+2)	Mi. Vučić (yellow card) 41'; Nikolić (yellow card) 52'; Fukui 53'; D. Božović (yellow card) 71', (goal) 81' (pen.)	Report	Jovanović (yellow card) 63'; Mészáros (yellow card) 81'; N. Balogh (yellow card) 90+4'	Stadium: Gradski stadion Attendance: 1,214; Referee: Erik Lambrechts (Belgium); Assistant referees: Karel De Rocker (Belgium), Jo de Weirdt (Belgium); Fourth official: Wim Smet (Belgium)
Note: Debrecen won 3–2 on aggregate.

===== Second qualifying round =====
16 July 2015 First leg	Skonto (Latvia)	2–2	(Hungary) Debrecen	Riga, Latvia
19:00 EEST (UTC+3)	Karašausks 27', 47'; Kozlovs (yellow card) 77'; Timofejevs (yellow card) 80'; Murillo (yellow card) 90+4'	Report	Tisza 9', (yellow card) 33'; Jovanović (yellow card) 40'; Korhut (yellow card) 64'; Castillion 72'; Mészáros (yellow card) 89'; Brković (yellow card) 90'	Stadium: Skonto Stadium; Attendance: 2,200; Referee: Mads-Kristoffer Kristoffersen (Denmark); Assistant referees: Lars Rix (Denmark), Henrik Sønderby (Denmark); Fourth official: Michael Tykgaard (Denmark)

23 July 2015 Second leg	Debrecen (Hungary)	9–2 (11–4 agg.)	(Latvia) Skonto	Debrecen, Hungary
17:00 CEST (UTC+2)	Tisza 7', 45+2'; N. Balogh 12'; Sidibe 29', 31'; Varga (yellow card) 38'; Brković 51'; Szakály 54' (pen.); Bódi 58'; Castillion 70'	Report	Kovaļovs (yellow card) 27' (yellow-red card) 80'; Indrāns (yellow card) 57'; Gutkovskis 59'; Rode 65'; Timofejevs (yellow card) 72'	Stadium: Nagyerdei Stadion; Attendance: 8,532; Referee: Vitali Meshkov (Russia); Assistant referees: Anton Averianov (Russia), Igor Demeshko (Russia); Fourth official: Vladimir Moskalev (Russia)
Note: Debrecen won 11–4 on aggregate.

===== Third qualifying round =====
30 July 2015 First leg	Debrecen (Hungary)	2–3	(Norway) Rosenborg	Debrecen, Hungary
20:00 CEST (UTC+2)	N. Balogh 33'; Varga (yellow card) 49'; Brković (yellow card) 57'; Bódi 90'	Report	Helland (yellow card) 45', (goal) 58'; Mikkelsen 52', 87'	Stadium: Nagyerdei Stadion; Attendance: 10,532; Referee: Neil Doyle (Republic of Ireland); Assistant referees: Mark Gavin (Republic of Ireland), Robert Clarke (Republic of Ireland); Fourth official: Tomas Connolly (Republic of Ireland)

6 August 2015 Second leg	Rosenborg (Norway)	3–1 (6–3 agg.)	(Hungary) Debrecen	Trondheim, Norway
19:00 CEST (UTC+2)	Søderlund 27'; Jensen 40'; Vilhjálmsson 86'	Report	Castillion 43'; Máté (yellow card) 45+1' (yellow-red card) 48'; Bódi (yellow card) 90+3'	Stadium: Lerkendal Stadion; Attendance: 12,919; Referee: Clayton Pisani (Malta); Assistant referees: Alan Camilleri (Malta), Edward Spiteri (Malta); Fourth official: Philip Farrugia (Malta)
Note: Rosenborg won 6–3 on aggregate.

== Statistics ==
=== Overall ===
Appearances (Apps) numbers are for appearances in competitive games only, including sub appearances.
Source: Competitions

No.	Player	Pos.	Nemzeti Bajnokság I				Magyar Kupa				UEFA Europa League				Total			
No.	Player	Pos.	Apps	Goal	Booked	Sent off (straight red)	Apps	Goal	Booked	Sent off (straight red)	Apps	Goal	Booked	Sent off (straight red)	Apps	Goal	Booked	Sent off (straight red)
1	(Hungary) Balázs Slakta	GK					1								1			
3	(Hungary) Csaba Szatmári	DF	2				5								7			
5	(Hungary) Péter Szilvási	DF					1								1			
6	(Hungary) László Zsidai	MF	13	1	4						4				17	1	4	
7	(Hungary) Tibor Dombi	MF																
8	(Hungary) Dávid Holman	MF	13	2	1		3		2						16	2	3	
8	(Hungary) Kristóf Kondás	MF					1								1			
10	(Slovenia) Rene Mihelič	MF	3								3	1			6	1		
11	(Hungary) János Ferenczi	MF	14		2		5	1							19	1	2	
13	(Hungary) Pál Lázár	DF	16		4		4								20		4	
14	(Hungary) Attila Nagy	MF																
15	(Hungary) Bence Sós	FW	3				2	2							5	2		
16	(Hungary) Norbert Balogh	FW	18	3	2	1					6	2	1		24	5	3	1
16	(Bosnia and Herzegovina) Ognjen Đelmić	MF	7				2	1							9	1		
17	(Hungary) Norbert Mészáros	DF	29				2				5		2		36		2	
18	(Hungary) Péter Máté	DF	15	1	5		1				2			1	18	1	5	1
19	(Hungary) Szabolcs Barna	DF					1								1			
20	(Hungary) Tamás Takács	FW	10	5		1	3	3							13	8		1
21	(Hungary) Bence Ludánszki	MF																
22	(Croatia) Božidar Radošević	GK	23				5								28			
23	(Hungary) Dániel Bereczki	FW	5				3								8			
24	(Estonia) Igor Morozov	DF	2		1						2				4		1	
24	(Hungary) Ákos Vincze	DF					1								1			
25	(Serbia) Dušan Brković	DF	28	1	5	1	4	1	1		5	2	3		37	4	9	1
26	(Senegal) Ibrahima Sidibe	FW	22	5	3		1				6	3			29	8	3	
27	(Hungary) Ádám Bódi	MF	27	2	5	1	5				6	2	1		38	4	6	1
28	(Hungary) Zoltán Nagy	DF	4	1	1		1								5	1	1	
30	(Hungary) János Balogh	GK																
33	(Hungary) József Varga	MF	25		5		4		1		6		2		35		8	
37	(Hungary) Ákos Kinyik	DF					2		1						2		1	
39	(France) Adamo Coulibaly	FW	7				2								9			
44	(Hungary) Tibor Tisza	FW	24	6	3		4	1			4	3	1		32	10	4	
45	(Hungary) Tamás Rácz	GK																
53	(Hungary) Péter Berdó	DF	1				1								2			
55	(Hungary) Péter Szakály	MF	19	2	5		6		2		5	1			30	3	7	
66	(Hungary) Márk Szécsi	FW	7		1		3	1			2				12	1	1	
69	(Hungary) Mihály Korhut	DF	31	2	7		3		1		6		1		40	2	9	
70	(Hungary) Tamás Kulcsár	FW	18	3	1		2				2				22	3	1	
77	(Serbia) Aleksandar Jovanović	MF	29	3	8		6		2		6		2		41	3	12	
87	(Hungary) István Verpecz	GK	10				2			1	6				18			1
88	(Hungary) Zsolt Horváth	FW	18	6	1		7	1			4				29	7	1	
91	(Netherlands) Geoffrey Castillion	FW	15	2	2	1	3	1			4	3			22	6	2	1
Own goals				3				1								4		
Totals				48	66	5		13	10	1		17	13	1		78	89	7

=== Hat-tricks ===
No.	Player	Against	Result	Date	Competition
88	(Hungary) Zsolt Horváth	MTK (H)	3–1	12 December 2015	Nemzeti Bajnokság I
20	(Hungary) Tamás Takács	Nyíregyháza (H)	5–0	1 March 2016	Magyar Kupa

=== Clean sheets ===
			Clean sheets			
No.	Player	Games Played	Nemzeti Bajnokság I	Magyar Kupa	UEFA Europa League	Total
22	(Croatia) Božidar Radošević	28	8	3		11
87	(Hungary) István Verpecz	18	4	1	1	6
1	(Hungary) Balázs Slakta	1		1		1
30	(Hungary) János Balogh					
45	(Hungary) Tamás Rácz					
Totals			12	5	1	18
