= 2013–14 Debreceni VSC season =

Debreceni VSC
2013–14 season
- Chairman: (Hungary) Gábor Szima
- Manager: (Hungary) Elemér Kondás
- NB 1: Winner
- UEFA Europa League: Second Qualifying Round
- Hungarian Cup: Semi-final
- Hungarian League Cup: Semi-final
- Top goalscorer: League: (Senegal) Ibrahima Sidibe (10) (Hungary) Tamás Kulcsár (10); All: (Slovenia) Dalibor Volaš (18)
- Highest home attendance: 20,000 vs Újpest (10 May 2014)
- Lowest home attendance: 1,000 vs Mezőkövesd (13 November 2013)
Home colours	Away colours

The 2013–14 season was Debreceni VSC's 36th competitive season, 21st consecutive season in the OTP Bank Liga and 111th year in existence as a football club.

== First team squad ==
Note: Flags indicate national team as defined under FIFA eligibility rules; some limited exceptions apply. Players may hold more than one non-FIFA nationality.

No.	Pos.	Nation	Player
4	MF	CIV	Joël Damahou
6	MF	HUN	László Zsidai
7	MF	HUN	Tibor Dombi
8	MF	FRA	Selim Bouadla
10	MF	SVN	Rene Mihelič
11	MF	HUN	János Ferenczi
13	DF	HUN	Pál Lázár
14	MF	HUN	Dániel Vadnai
17	DF	HUN	Norbert Mészáros
18	DF	HUN	Péter Máté
19	FW	SVN	Dalibor Volaš
21	DF	HUN	Bence Ludánszki
22	DF	HUN	Csaba Bernáth

No.	Pos.	Nation	Player
24	DF	EST	Igor Morozov
25	DF	SRB	Dušan Brković
26	FW	SEN	Ibrahima Sidibe
27	MF	HUN	Ádám Bódi
28	DF	HUN	Zoltán Nagy
44	FW	HUN	Tibor Tisza
45	GK	SRB	Nenad Novaković
55	MF	HUN	Péter Szakály
69	DF	HUN	Mihály Korhut
70	FW	HUN	Tamás Kulcsár
87	GK	HUN	István Verpecz
88	FW	FRA	L´Imam Seydi

== Transfers ==
=== Summer ===
In: Note: Flags indicate national team as defined under FIFA eligibility rules; some limited exceptions apply. Players may hold more than one non-FIFA nationality.

No.	Pos.	Nation	Player
4	MF	CIV	Joël Damahou (from (Israel) Hapoel Ra'anana)
5	DF	SRB	Aleksandar Trninić (from (Serbia) Čukarički)
6	MF	HUN	László Zsidai (from MTK)
13	DF	HUN	Pál Lázár (from Pécs)
14	MF	HUN	Dániel Vadnai (from MTK)
14	FW	NGA	Eugène Salami (loan return from Kecskemét)
16	DF	HUN	Martin Króner (from Vác)
19	FW	SVN	Dalibor Volaš (from (Russia) Mordovia)
20	FW	HUN	Zoltán Horváth (from Eger)
24	DF	EST	Igor Morozov (from (Poland) Polonia Warsaw)
25	DF	SRB	Dušan Brković (from (Israel) Hapoel Haifa)
33	MF	HUN	József Varga (loan return from (Germany) Greuther Fürth)
85	FW	ROU	Cristian Bud (from (Romania) Cluj)
88	FW	FRA	L´Imam Seydi (from Diósgyőr)
91	FW	HUN	Ádám Balajti (loan return from MTK)

Out: Note: Flags indicate national team as defined under FIFA eligibility rules; some limited exceptions apply. Players may hold more than one non-FIFA nationality.

No.	Pos.	Nation	Player
2	DF	HUN	István Szűcs (loan to Békéscsaba)
4	DF	GER	Dajan Šimac (to (Turkey) Denizlispor)
6	MF	HON	Luis Ramos (to (France) Châteauroux)
14	FW	NGA	Eugène Salami (to (Czech Republic) Teplice)
20	FW	HUN	Zoltán Horváth (Suspended)
30	FW	BIH	Stevo Nikolić
33	MF	HUN	József Varga (loan to (England) Middlesbrough)
37	MF	BRA	Lucas (loan to Békéscsaba)
39	FW	FRA	Adamo Coulibaly (to (France) Lens)
60	FW	HUN	Péter Pölöskey (loan to Pécs)
77	MF	HUN	Péter Czvitkovics (to Puskás)
85	FW	ROU	Cristian Bud (to (Romania) Gaz Metan)
91	FW	HUN	Ádám Balajti (loan to Mezőkövesd)
92	DF	FRA	Mamadou Wague (to Puskás)

=== Winter ===
In: Note: Flags indicate national team as defined under FIFA eligibility rules; some limited exceptions apply. Players may hold more than one non-FIFA nationality.

No.	Pos.	Nation	Player
2	DF	HUN	István Szűcs (loan return from Békéscsaba)
10	MF	SVN	Rene Mihelič (from (Slovenia) Zavrč)
23	FW	HUN	Ádám Kovács (from Nyíregyháza)
66	FW	HUN	Tibor Tisza (from Diósgyőr)

Out: Note: Flags indicate national team as defined under FIFA eligibility rules; some limited exceptions apply. Players may hold more than one non-FIFA nationality.

No.	Pos.	Nation	Player
1	GK	MNE	Vukašin Poleksić (loan to Kecskemét)
2	DF	HUN	István Szűcs (loan to Létavértes)
5	DF	SRB	Aleksandar Trninić (to (North Macedonia) Vardar Skopje)
15	MF	HUN	László Rezes (to Nyíregyháza)
23	MF	FRA	Slimane Bouadla
66	FW	HUN	Márk Szécsi (loan to Kecskemét)

- List of Hungarian football transfers summer 2013
- List of Hungarian football transfers winter 2013–14

== Pre-season and friendlies ==
29 June 2013 1	Debreceni VSC (Hungary)	5–0	(Slovakia) 1. FC Tatran Prešov	Debrecen
CEST	Kulcsár 40'; Korhut 54'; Czvitkovics 62', 74' (pen.); Nikolić 79' (pen.)	Report		Stadium: Debrecen-Pallag; Attendance: 300; Referee: (Hungary) Katalin Kulcsár

29 June 2013 2	Debreceni VSC (Hungary)	2–1	(Hungary) Diósgyőri VTK	Debrecen
CEST	Rezes 5'; Horváth 69'	Report	Rudolf 42'	Stadium: Debrecen-Pallag; Attendance: 600; Referee: (Hungary) Roland Veizer

6 July 2013 3	MFK Košice (Slovakia)	4–1	(Hungary) Debreceni VSC	Košice
CEST	Korjikov 47'; Coulibaly 53'; Pačinda 66'; Pilipchuk 85'	Report	Czvitkovics 50' (pen.)	Stadium: Lokomotíva Stadium; Attendance: 150; Referee: (Slovakia) Kohl

6 July 2013 4	MFK Košice (Slovakia)	1–0	(Hungary) Debreceni VSC	Košice
CEST	Haskić 63'	Report		Stadium: Lokomotíva Stadium; Attendance: 300; Referee: (Slovakia) Eperiesi

7 July 2013 5	Debreceni VSC (Hungary)	1–3	(Hungary) Kecskeméti TE	Debrecen
16:00 CEST	Horváth 27'	Report	Balázs 17'; Karan 45'; Rajczi 82'	Stadium: Pallag; Attendance: 300; Referee: (Hungary) Ferenc Karakó

10 July 2013 6	Debreceni VSC (Hungary)	2–0	(Romania) CS Gaz Metan Mediaș	Debrecen
CEST	Horváth 28'; Kulcsár 53'	Report		Stadium: Stadion Oláh Gábor Út; Attendance: 2,000; Referee: (Hungary) Péter Solymosi

14 July 2013 7	Debreceni VSC (Hungary)	6–0	(Hungary) Balmazújvárosi FC	Debrecen
CEST	Horváth 25'; Czvitkovics 42' (pen.); Ferenczi 59' (pen.), 73'; Bud 70'; Pölöskey 86'	Report		Stadium: Stadion Oláh Gábor Út; Attendance: 400; Referee: (Hungary)

20 July 2013 8	Debreceni VSC (Hungary)	1–2	(Hungary) Szigetszentmiklós	Debrecen
CEST	Volaš	Report	Zsivóczky; Ducic	Stadium: Stadion Oláh Gábor Út; Attendance: 300; Referee: (Hungary) János Takács

== Competitions ==
=== Super Cup ===
13 July 2013	Győr	3–0	Debrecen	Budapest
20:30 CEST	Trajković 33'; Koltai 45'; Kalmár 86'	Report		Stadium: Puskás Ferenc Stadion; Attendance: 2 000; Referee: (Hungary) Sándor Andó-Szabó

=== Nemzeti Bajnokság I ===
==== League table ====
Pos	Team	Pld	W	D	L	GF	GA	GD	Pts	Qualification or relegation
1	Debrecen (C)	30	18	8	4	66	33	+33	62	Qualification for Champions League second qualifying round
2	Győr	30	18	8	4	58	32	+26	62	Qualification for Europa League second qualifying round
3	Ferencváros	30	17	6	7	47	33	+14	57	Qualification for Europa League first qualifying round
4	Videoton	30	15	8	7	52	31	+21	53	
5	Diósgyőr	30	12	11	7	45	38	+7	47	Qualification for Europa League first qualifying round (Note: Diósgyőr qualified for the Europa League first qualifying round as the 2013–14 Magyar Kupa runners-up since the winners, Újpest, failed to receive the UEFA license to participate in European competitions.)

Source: mlsz.hu (in Hungarian)
Rules for classification: 1st points; 2nd overall wins; 3rd goal difference; 4th head-to-head points; 5th head-to-head goal difference; 6th head-to-head away goals scored; 7th fair-play points; 8th drawing of lots
(C) Champions

==== Results summary ====
Overall								Home						Away					
Pld	W	D	L	GF	GA	GD	Pts	W	D	L	GF	GA	GD	W	D	L	GF	GA	GD
30	18	8	4	66	33	+33	62	11	3	1	38	13	+25	7	5	3	28	20	+8

Last updated: 1 June 2014.
Source: NB1

==== Results by round ====
Round	1	2	3	4	5	6	7	8	9	10	11	12	13	14	15	16	17	18	19	20	21	22	23	24	25	26	27	28	29	30
Ground	H	H	H	A	H	A	H	A	H	H	A	H	A	H	A	A	A	A	H	A	H	A	H	A	A	H	A	H	A	H
Result	W	W	W	D	W	L	W	L	W	D	W	D	W	W	W	W	D	D	W	D	W	W	D	L	D	W	W	W	W	L
Position	1	1	1	2	1	2	1	3	2	3	3	3	2	2	1	1	1	1	1	1	1	1	1	1	1	1	1	1	1	1

Updated to match(es) played on 1 June 2014. Source: Matches
A = Away; H = Home; W = Win; D = Draw; L = Loss

==== Matches ====
28 July 2013 1	Debrecen	7–1	Kaposvár	Debrecen
20:30 CEST	Sidibe 13' (pen.); Korhut 38'; Kulcsár 50', 53'; Ferenczi 70'; Horváth 78'; Zsidai 87'	Report	Vručina 8'	Stadium: Stadion Oláh Gábor Út; Attendance: 2,500; Referee: (Hungary) Ádám Farkas

4 August 2013 2	Debrecen	1–0	Mezőkövesd	Debrecen
20:30 CEST	Szakály 80'	Report		Stadium: Stadion Oláh Gábor Út; Attendance: 3,500; Referee: (Hungary) István Vad

11 August 2013 3	Debrecen	4–0	Diósgyőr	Debrecen
16:30 CEST	Bódi 33'; Volaš 38'; Szakály 61'; Dombi 90+2'	Report		Stadium: Stadion Oláh Gábor Út; Attendance: 6,500; Referee: (Hungary) Zsolt Szabó

18 August 2013 4	Szombathely	1–1	Debrecen	Szombathely
20:30 CEST	Németh 90+4'	Report	Szakály 55' (pen.)	Stadium: Rohonci úti Stadion; Attendance: 3,210; Referee: (Hungary) Mihály Fábián

25 August 2013 5	Debrecen	4–1	Ferencváros	Debrecen
16:30 CEST	Bódi 9'; Volaš 48', 61' (pen.); Szakály 90+3'	Report	Böde 36'	Stadium: Stadion Oláh Gábor Út; Attendance: 9,000; Referee: (Hungary) Ádám Farkas

1 September 2013 6	Pécs	2–1	Debrecen	Pécs
16:30 CEST	Koller 31', 67'	Report	Volaš 5'	Stadium: Stadion PMFC; Attendance: 2,200; Referee: (Hungary) Dániel Becséri

15 September 2013 7	Debrecen	2–1	Videoton	Debrecen
16:30 CEST	Sidibe 60'; Volaš 78'	Report	Gyurcsó 51'	Stadium: Stadion Oláh Gábor Út; Attendance: 7,500; Referee: (Hungary) István Vad

22 September 2013 8	Győr	3–0	Debrecen	Győr
18:30 CEST	Völgyi 2'; Kamber 60'; Varga 90+1'	Report		Stadium: ETO Park; Attendance: 2,800; Referee: (Hungary) Ádám Farkas

29 September 2013 9	Debrecen	1–0	MTK	Debrecen
16:30 CEST	Szakály 65'	Report		Stadium: Stadion Oláh Gábor Út; Attendance: 4,000; Referee: (Hungary) József Erdős

4 October 2013 10	Debrecen	2–2	Paks	Debrecen
19:00 CEST	Sidibe 6'; Brković 79'	Report	Simon 10', 60' (pen.)	Stadium: Stadion Oláh Gábor Út; Attendance: 3,500; Referee: (Hungary) Ádám Farkas

19 October 2013 11	Kecskemét	0–3	Debrecen	Kecskemét
16:00 CEST		Report	Kulcsár 32'; Bouadla 45'; Korhut 80'	Stadium: Széktói Stadion; Attendance: 1,412; Referee: (Hungary) Sándor Andó-Szabó

26 October 2013 12	Debrecen	2–2	Pápa	Debrecen
14:00 CEST	Struhár 6' (o.g.); Sidibe 63' (pen.)	Report	Kenesei 87'; Orosz 90+2'	Stadium: Stadion Oláh Gábor Út; Attendance: 4,500; Referee: (Hungary) Zsolt Szabó

3 November 2013 13	Újpest	1–4	Debrecen	Budapest
16:30 CET	Simon 62'	Report	Kulcsár 7'; Sidibe 10', 76'; Bouadla 12'	Stadium: Szusza Ferenc Stadium; Attendance: 2,811; Referee: (Hungary) István Vad

9 November 2013 14	Debrecen	2–1	Puskás	Debrecen
14:00 CET	Szakály 10'; Volaš 28' (pen.)	Report	Tischler 24'	Stadium: Stadion Oláh Gábor Út; Attendance: 3,500; Referee: (Hungary) Ádám Németh

23 November 2013 15	Honvéd	1–3	Debrecen	Budapest
14:00 CET	Perea 83' (pen.)	Report	Zsidai 45'; Szakály 58'; Kulcsár 63'	Stadium: Bozsik Stadion; Attendance: 2,000; Referee: (Hungary) Viktor Kassai

30 November 2013 16	Kaposvár	1–2	Debrecen	Kaposvár
14:00 CET	Waltner 69'	Report	Ludánszki 37'; Bouadla 82'	Stadium: Stadion Kaposvár Rákóczi; Attendance: 1,500; Referee: (Hungary) Tamás Bognár

6 December 2013 17	Mezőkövesd	2–2	Debrecen	Mezőkövesd
19:00 CET	Melczer 68' (pen.); Harsányi 82'	Report	Kulcsár 28'; Bouadla 53'	Stadium: Városi Stadion; Attendance: 1,000; Referee: (Hungary) István Vad

2 March 2014 18	Diósgyőr	1–1	Debrecen	Miskolc
18:30 CET	Futács 17'	Report	Volaš 15'	Stadium: DVTK Stadion; Attendance: 6,067; Referee: (Hungary) István Vad

9 March 2014 19	Debrecen	2–0	Szombathely	Debrecen
16:30 CET	Máté 60'; Bódi 83'	Report		Stadium: Stadion Oláh Gábor Út; Attendance: 6,000; Referee: (Hungary) József Erdős

16 March 2014 20	Ferencváros	1–1	Debrecen	Budapest
16:30 CET	Somália 8'	Report	Volaš 27'	Stadium: Ferenc Puskás Stadium; Attendance: 8,179; Referee: (Hungary) Viktor Kassai

22 March 2014 21	Debrecen	1–0	Pécs	Debrecen
14:00 CET	Tisza 90' (pen.)	Report		Stadium: Stadion Oláh Gábor Út; Attendance: 6,500; Referee: (Hungary) Sándor Andó-Szabó

30 March 2014 22	Videoton	1–2	Debrecen	Székesfehérvár
16:30 CEST	Nikolić 15'	Report	Caneira 25' (o.g.); Máté 36'	Stadium: Sóstói Stadion; Attendance: 5,232; Referee: (Hungary) Zoltán Iványi

5 April 2014 23	Debrecen	2–2	Győr	Debrecen
20:00 CEST	Lázár 22'; Mihelič 60'	Report	Pátkai 11'; Střeštík 25'	Stadium: Stadion Oláh Gábor Út; Attendance: 8,500; Referee: (Hungary) Viktor Kassai

12 April 2014 24	MTK	5–2	Debrecen	Budapest
20:00 CEST	Horváth 11'; Vass 14'; Pölöskei 48'; Kanta 62' (pen.); Vukmir 82'	Report	Vadnai 22'; Kulcsár 40'	Stadium: Hidegkuti Nándor Stadium; Attendance: 1,500; Referee: (Hungary) István Vad

19 April 2014 25	Paks	0–0	Debrecen	Paks
16:00 CEST		Report		Stadium: Stadion PSE; Attendance: 1,000; Referee: (Hungary) Zsolt Szabó

26 April 2014 26	Debrecen	5–0	Kecskemét	Debrecen
18:00 CEST	Sidibe 28', 37'; Mihelič 75'; Kulcsár 82', 83'	Report		Stadium: Stadion Oláh Gábor Út; Attendance: 7,500; Referee: (Hungary) Zoltán Iványi

4 May 2014 27	Pápa	1–5	Debrecen	Pápa
18:30 CEST	Griffiths 43'	Report	Sidibe 40', 53' (pen.); Mihelič 46'; Seydi 87', 89'	Stadium: Stadion Várkerti; Attendance: 1,500; Referee: (Hungary) Viktor Kassai

10 May 2014 28	Debrecen	3–1	Újpest	Debrecen
20:00 CEST	Kulcsár 27'; Antón 46' (o.g.); Vadnai 85'	Report	Vasiljević 37'	Stadium: Nagyerdei Stadion; Attendance: 20,000; Referee: (Hungary) József Erdős

25 May 2014 29	Puskás	0–1	Debrecen	Felcsút
15:00 CEST		Report	Bódi 66'	Stadium: Pancho Arena; Attendance: 2,127; Referee: (Hungary) Tamás Bognár

31 May 2014 30	Debrecen	0–2	Honvéd	Debrecen
20:00 CEST		Report	Vernes 63'; Lőrinczy 90+3'	Stadium: Nagyerdei Stadion; Attendance: 20,000; Referee: (Hungary) Sándor Andó-Szabó

=== Hungarian Cup ===
30 October 2013 Round of 32	ESMTK	1–2	Debrecen	Budapest
12:30 CET	Lőrinczy 21'	Report	Szakály 63'; Volaš 89'	Stadium: Stadion Ady Endre Street; Attendance: 500; Referee: (Hungary) Béla Botló

26 November 2013 Round of 16 (1st leg)	Dunaújváros	1–1	Debrecen	Dunaújváros
12:30 CET	Godslove 9'	Report	Volaš 59'	Stadium: Dunaferr Arena; Attendance: 600; Referee: (Hungary) Zsolt Szabó

3 December 2013 Round of 16 (2nd leg)	Debrecen	2–0 (3–1 agg.)	Dunaújváros	Debrecen
17:00 CET	Máté 24'; Volaš 67'	Report		Stadium: Stadion Oláh Gábor Út; Attendance: 1,800; Referee: (Hungary) József Erdős

12 March 2014 Quarter-final (1st leg)	Nyíregyháza	1–3	Debrecen	Nyíregyháza
17:30 CET	Huszák 63'	Report	Tisza 50', 78'; Bódi 54'	Stadium: Városi Stadion; Attendance: 2,500; Referee: (Hungary) Ádám Farkas

25 March 2014 Quarter-final (2nd leg)	Debrecen	6–1 (9–2 agg.)	Nyíregyháza	Debrecen
17:00 CET	Seydi 6'; Sidibe 39' (pen.), 78'; Ferenczi 45'; Króner 53'; Kulcsár 75'	Report	Máté 29'	Stadium: Stadion Oláh Gábor Út; Attendance: 2,000; Referee: (Hungary) Gábor Oláh

15 April 2014 Semi-final (1st leg)	Debrecen	4–2	Diósgyőr	Debrecen
18:00 CEST	Seydi 21'; Volaš 33'; Bódi 41'; Tisza 86'	Report	Grumić 36'; Elek 90'	Stadium: Stadion Oláh Gábor Út; Attendance: 2,500; Referee: (Hungary) Sándor Andó-Szabó

7 May 2014 Semi-final (2nd leg)	Diósgyőr	2–0 ((a) 4 – 4 agg.)	Debrecen	Miskolc
18:00 CEST	Debreceni 2'; Bacsa 21'	Report		Stadium: DVTK Stadion; Attendance: 2,500; Referee: (Hungary) Zoltán Iványi

=== League Cup ===
==== Group stage ====
4 September 2013 1	Debrecen	3–0	Nyíregyháza	Debrecen
16:30 CEST	Ferenczi 52'; Brković 66'; Sidibe 74'	Report		Stadium: Stadion Oláh Gábor Út; Attendance: 2,500; Referee: (Hungary) József Berger

11 September 2013 2	Mezőkövesd	0–2	Debrecen	Mezőkövesd
19:00 CEST		Report	Dombi 41'; Trninić 58'	Stadium: Városi Stadion; Attendance: 800; Referee: (Hungary) Balázs Böcskei

9 October 2013 3	Debrecen	2–0	Balmazújváros	Debrecen
15:00 CEST	Seydi 56'; Volaš 84'	Report		Stadium: Stadion Oláh Gábor Út; Attendance: 1,500; Referee: (Hungary) Ferenc Karakó

16 October 2013 4	Balmazújváros	1–5	Debrecen	Balmazújváros
14:00 CEST	Urbin 66'	Report	Bouadla 2'; Spitzmüller 4'; Volaš 10'; Króner 32'; Szécsi 77'	Stadium: Batthyány utcai Sportpálya; Attendance: 300; Referee: (Hungary) László Lovas

13 November 2013 5	Debrecen	2–4	Mezőkövesd	Debrecen
13:30 CET	Seydi 60'; Szalai 72' (o.g.)	Report	Vaskó 17'; Harsányi 25'; Bognár 70', 88'	Stadium: Stadion Oláh Gábor Út; Attendance: 1,000; Referee: (Hungary) László Lovas

20 November 2013 6	Nyíregyháza	0–2	Debrecen	Nyíregyháza
17:00 CET		Report	Volaš 64', 68' (pen.)	Stadium: Városi Stadion; Attendance: 400; Referee: (Hungary) Zoltán Iványi

===== Classification =====
Pos	Team	Pld	W	D	L	GF	GA	GD	Pts	Qualification
1	Debrecen	6	5	0	1	16	5	+11	15	Advance to knockout phase
2	Mezőkövesd	6	3	1	2	16	11	+5	10	Advance to knockout phase
3	Nyíregyháza	6	1	2	3	5	11	−6	5	
4	Balmazújváros	6	1	1	4	6	16	−10	4	

Rules for classification: 1) points; 2) goal difference; 3) number of goals scored.

==== Knockout phase ====
26 February 2014 Round of 16 (1st leg)	Győr	2–1	Debrecen	Győr
17:00 CET	Dudás 51'; Rudolf 84'	Report	Bódi 47'	Stadium: ETO Park; Attendance: 1,500; Referee: (Hungary) Dániel Becséri

4 March 2014 Round of 16 (2nd leg)	Debrecen	3–1 (4–3 agg.)	Győr	Debrecen
17:00 CET	Bódi 50'; Bouadla 69'; Kovács 88'	Report	Nicorec 74' (pen.)	Stadium: Stadion Oláh Gábor Út; Attendance: 1,500; Referee: (Hungary) Ádám Németh

18 March 2014 Quarter-final (1st leg)	Debrecen	3–0	Puskás	Debrecen
17:00 CET	Tisza 26'	Report	Lencse 50'	Stadium: Stadion Oláh Gábor Út; Attendance: 1,200; Referee: (Hungary) István Vad

1 April 2014 Quarter-final (2nd leg)	Puskás	3–2 (3–5 agg.)	Debrecen	Felcsút
15:00 CEST	Tóth 36'; Németh 83'; Oldal 89'	Report	Volaš 5', 6'	Stadium: Felcsúti Sportkomplexum; Attendance: on closed Referee: (Hungary) József Erdős

22 April 2014 Semi-final (1st leg)	Debrecen	1–5	Videoton	Debrecen
18:00 CEST	Ludánszki 67'	Report	Petrolina 6', 74'; Alvarez 9'; Brachi 41'; Oliveira 82'	Stadium: Stadion Oláh Gábor Út; Attendance: 2,000; Referee: (Hungary) Ádám Farkas

29 April 2014 Semi-final (2nd leg)	Videoton	1–0 (6–1 agg.)	Debrecen	Székesfehérvár
17:30 CEST	Gyurcsó 38'	Report		Stadium: Sóstói Stadion; Attendance: 700; Referee: (Hungary) Zsolt Szabó

=== UEFA Europa League ===
The First and Second Qualifying Round draws took place at UEFA headquarters in Nyon, Switzerland on 24 June 2013.

18 July 2013 Q2 Leg 1	Strømsgodset (Norway)	2–2	(Hungary) Debrecen	Drammen
19:00 CEST	Horn 53'; Kovács 90+3'	(Report)	Sidibe 36', 55' (pen.)	Stadium: Marienlyst Stadion; Attendance: 3,582; Referee: (Romania) Marius Avram

25 July 2013 Q2 Leg 2	Debrecen (Hungary)	0–3 (2–5 agg.)	(Norway) Strømsgodset	Nyíregyháza
20:30 CEST		Report	Kovács 35'; Boateng 51'; Storflor 58'	Stadium: Sóstói Stadion; Referee: (Greece) Ilias Spathas

== Statistics ==
=== Appearances and goals ===
Last updated on 1 June 2014.

No.	Pos	Nat	Player	Total		OTP Bank Liga		Europa League		Hungarian Cup		League Cup	
No.	Pos	Nat	Player	Apps	Goals	Apps	Goals	Apps	Goals	Apps	Goals	Apps	Goals
4	MF	(Ivory Coast) CIV	Joël Damahou	4	0	0	0	1	0	0	0	3	0
6	MF	(Hungary) HUN	László Zsidai	31	2	28	2	2	0	1	0	0	0
7	MF	(Hungary) HUN	Tibor Dombi	23	2	10	1	0	0	3	0	10	1
8	MF	(France) FRA	Selim Bouadla	26	5	18	4	2	0	2	0	4	1
10	MF	(Slovenia) SVN	Rene Mihelič	16	3	13	3	0	0	3	0	0	0
11	MF	(Hungary) HUN	János Ferenczi	25	3	6	1	1	0	6	1	12	1
13	DF	(Hungary) HUN	Pál Lázár	26	1	24	1	0	0	2	0	0	0
14	MF	(Hungary) HUN	Dániel Vadnai	28	2	18	2	0	0	4	0	6	0
17	DF	(Hungary) HUN	Norbert Mészáros	26	0	23	0	1	0	1	0	1	0
18	DF	(Hungary) HUN	Péter Máté	27	3	22	2	2	0	3	1	0	0
19	FW	(Slovenia) SVN	Dalibor Volaš	33	18	21	8	1	0	5	4	6	6
21	DF	(Hungary) HUN	Bence Ludánszki	18	2	5	1	0	0	6	0	7	1
22	DF	(Hungary) HUN	Csaba Bernáth	14	0	1	0	0	0	4	0	9	0
24	DF	(Estonia) EST	Igor Morozov	15	0	10	0	1	0	1	0	3	0
25	DF	(Serbia) SRB	Dušan Brković	26	2	15	1	0	0	5	0	6	1
26	FW	(Senegal) SEN	Ibrahima Sidibe	34	15	25	10	2	2	3	2	4	1
27	MF	(Hungary) HUN	Ádám Bódi	34	8	24	4	1	0	5	2	4	2
28	DF	(Hungary) HUN	Zoltán Nagy	5	0	2	0	2	0	0	0	1	0
44	FW	(Hungary) HUN	Tibor Tisza	14	5	7	1	0	0	3	3	4	1
45	GK	(Serbia) SRB	Nenad Novaković	25	-22	20	-22	0	0	2	0	3	0
55	MF	(Hungary) HUN	Péter Szakály	35	8	28	7	2	0	5	1	0	0
69	DF	(Hungary) HUN	Mihály Korhut	32	2	28	2	2	0	1	0	1	0
70	FW	(Hungary) HUN	Tamás Kulcsár	35	11	30	10	2	0	3	1	0	0
87	GK	(Hungary) HUN	István Verpecz	25	-40	10	-11	2	-5	5	-7	8	-17
88	FW	(France) FRA	L´Imam Seydi	25	6	9	2	0	0	6	2	10	2
Youth players:
4	FW	(Hungary) HUN	Roland Szabó	1	0	0	0	0	0	0	0	1	0
4	DF	(Hungary) HUN	Krisztián Karikás	3	0	0	0	0	0	0	0	3	0
14	FW	(Hungary) HUN	Tamás Molnár	2	0	0	0	0	0	0	0	2	0
16	DF	(Hungary) HUN	Martin Króner	13	2	0	0	0	0	3	1	10	1
17	DF	(Hungary) HUN	Csaba Szatmári	8	0	0	0	0	0	1	0	7	0
21	FW	(Hungary) HUN	Vitalij Király	3	0	0	0	0	0	0	0	3	0
23	FW	(Hungary) HUN	Ádám Kovács	6	1	0	0	0	0	1	0	5	1
27	MF	(Hungary) HUN	Kristóf Kondás	4	0	0	0	0	0	0	0	4	0
28	DF	(Hungary) HUN	Szabolcs Barna	1	0	0	0	0	0	0	0	1	0
29	MF	(Hungary) HUN	István Spitzmüller	18	1	0	0	0	0	6	0	12	1
Out to loan:
1	GK	(Montenegro) MNE	Vukašin Poleksić	2	-1	0	0	0	0	1	-1	1	0
66	FW	(Hungary) HUN	Márk Szécsi	13	1	4	0	0	0	3	0	6	1
Players no longer at the club:
5	DF	(Serbia) SRB	Aleksandar Trninić	16	1	10	0	2	0	1	0	3	1
15	MF	(Hungary) HUN	László Rezes	6	0	2	0	0	0	2	0	2	0
20	FW	(Hungary) HUN	Zoltán Horváth	3	1	3	1	0	0	0	0	0	0
23	MF	(France) FRA	Slimane Bouadla	5	1	0	0	0	0	0	0	5	1
77	MF	(Hungary) HUN	Péter Czvitkovics	2	0	0	0	2	0	0	0	0	0

=== Top scorers ===
Includes all competitive matches. The list is sorted by shirt number when total goals are equal.

Last updated on 1 June 2014

Position	Nation	Number	Name	OTP Bank Liga	Hungarian Cup	Europa League	League Cup	Total
1	(Slovenia)	19	Dalibor Volaš	8	0	4	6	18
2	(Senegal)	26	Ibrahima Sidibe	10	2	2	1	15
3	(Hungary)	70	Tamás Kulcsár	10	0	1	0	11
4	(Hungary)	55	Péter Szakály	7	0	1	0	8
5	(Hungary)	27	Ádám Bódi	4	0	2	2	8
6	(France)	88	L´Imam Seydi	2	0	2	2	6
7	(France)	8	Selim Bouadla	4	0	0	1	5
8	(Hungary)	44	Tibor Tisza	1	0	3	1	5
9	(Slovenia)	10	Rene Mihelič	3	0	0	0	3
10	(Hungary)	18	Péter Máté	2	0	1	0	3
11	(Hungary)	11	János Ferenczi	1	0	1	1	3
12	(Hungary)	69	Mihály Korhut	2	0	0	0	2
13	(Hungary)	6	László Zsidai	2	0	0	0	2
14	(Hungary)	14	Dániel Vadnai	2	0	0	0	2
15	(Hungary)	7	Tibor Dombi	1	0	0	1	2
16	(Serbia)	25	Dušan Brković	1	0	0	1	2
17	(Hungary)	21	Bence Ludánszki	1	0	0	1	2
18	(Hungary)	16	Martin Króner	0	0	1	1	2
19	(Hungary)	20	Zoltán Horváth	1	0	0	0	1
20	(Hungary)	13	Pál Lázár	1	0	0	0	1
21	(Serbia)	5	Aleksandar Trninić	0	0	0	1	1
22	(France)	23	Slimane Bouadla	0	0	0	1	1
23	(Hungary)	29	István Spitzmüller	0	0	0	1	1
24	(Hungary)	66	Márk Szécsi	0	0	0	1	1
25	(Hungary)	23	Ádám Kovács	0	0	0	1	1
/	/	/	Own Goals	3	0	0	1	4
			TOTALS	66	2	18	24	110

=== Disciplinary record ===
Includes all competitive matches. Players with 1 card or more included only.

Last updated on 1 June 2014

Position	Nation	Number	Name	OTP Bank Liga		Europa League		Hungarian Cup		League Cup		Total (Hu Total)	
Position	Nation	Number	Name	Booked	Sent off (straight red)	Booked	Sent off (straight red)	Booked	Sent off (straight red)	Booked	Sent off (straight red)	Booked	Sent off (straight red)
MF	(Ivory Coast)	4	Joël Damahou	0	0	0	0	0	0	1	0	1 (0)	0 (0)
DF	(Serbia)	5	Aleksandar Trninić	1	1	1	0	0	0	1	0	3 (1)	1 (1)
MF	(Hungary)	6	László Zsidai	8	0	0	0	0	0	0	0	8 (8)	0 (0)
MF	(Hungary)	7	Tibor Dombi	3	0	0	0	0	0	2	0	5 (3)	0 (0)
MF	(France)	8	Selim Bouadla	6	1	1	0	0	0	1	0	8 (6)	1 (1)
MF	(Slovenia)	10	Rene Mihelič	2	0	0	0	0	0	0	0	2 (2)	0 (0)
MF	(Hungary)	11	János Ferenczi	2	0	0	0	2	0	0	0	4 (2)	0 (0)
DF	(Hungary)	13	Pál Lázár	9	1	0	0	1	0	0	0	10 (9)	1 (1)
MF	(Hungary)	14	Dániel Vadnai	2	0	0	0	0	0	1	0	3 (2)	0 (0)
MF	(Hungary)	15	László Rezes	1	0	0	0	0	0	0	0	1 (1)	0 (0)
FW	(Hungary)	15	Vitalij Király	0	0	0	0	0	0	1	0	1 (0)	0 (0)
DF	(Hungary)	17	Norbert Mészáros	4	0	0	0	0	0	0	0	4 (4)	0 (0)
DF	(Hungary)	18	Péter Máté	4	0	1	0	1	0	0	0	6 (4)	0 (0)
FW	(Slovenia)	19	Dalibor Volaš	1	0	0	0	0	0	2	0	3 (1)	0 (0)
DF	(Hungary)	21	Bence Ludánszki	1	0	0	0	1	0	0	0	2 (1)	0 (0)
DF	(Hungary)	22	Csaba Bernáth	0	0	0	0	0	0	2	0	2 (0)	0 (0)
FW	(Hungary)	23	Ádám Kovács	0	0	0	0	0	0	3	0	3 (0)	0 (0)
DF	(Estonia)	24	Igor Morozov	4	0	0	0	0	0	1	0	5 (4)	0 (0)
DF	(Serbia)	25	Dušan Brković	3	0	0	0	1	0	2	0	6 (3)	0 (0)
FW	(Senegal)	26	Ibrahima Sidibe	4	0	1	0	0	0	0	0	5 (4)	0 (0)
MF	(Hungary)	27	Ádám Bódi	2	1	0	1	1	0	0	0	3 (2)	2 (1)
MF	(Hungary)	29	István Spitzmüller	0	0	0	0	1	0	0	0	1 (0)	0 (0)
FW	(Hungary)	44	Tibor Tisza	0	0	0	0	0	0	1	0	1 (0)	0 (0)
MF	(Hungary)	55	Péter Szakály	8	0	0	0	2	0	0	0	10 (8)	0 (0)
DF	(Hungary)	69	Mihály Korhut	2	1	0	0	0	0	0	0	2 (2)	1 (1)
FW	(Hungary)	70	Tamás Kulcsár	3	0	0	0	0	0	0	0	3 (3)	0 (0)
GK	(Hungary)	87	István Verpecz	0	0	0	0	0	1	1	0	1 (0)	1 (0)
FW	(France)	88	L´Imam Seydi	2	0	0	0	0	0	2	0	4 (2)	0 (0)
			TOTALS	72	6	4	1	10	1	21	0	107 (72)	8 (6)

=== Overall ===
Games played	51 (30 OTP Bank Liga, 2 Europa League, 7 Hungarian Cup and 12 Hungarian League Cup)
Games won	30 (18 OTP Bank Liga, 0 Europa League, 5 Hungarian Cup and 7 Hungarian League Cup)
Games drawn	10 (8 OTP Bank Liga, 1 Europa League, 1 Hungarian Cup and 0 Hungarian League Cup)
Games lost	11 (4 OTP Bank Liga, 1 Europa League, 1 Hungarian Cup and 5 Hungarian League Cup)
Goals scored	112
Goals conceded	63
Goal difference	+49
Yellow cards	107
Red cards	7
Worst discipline	(Hungary) Pál Lázár (10 (yellow card) , 1 (red card) )
Best result	7–1 (H) v Kaposvár – OTP Bank Liga – 28–07–2013
Worst result	1–5 (H) v Videoton – Ligakupa – 22–04–2014
Most appearances	(Hungary) Péter Szakály (35 appearances)
Most appearances	(Hungary) Tamás Kulcsár (35 appearances)
Top scorer	(Slovenia) Dalibor Volaš (18 goals)
Points	103/153 (67.32%)

Last updated: 1 June 2014
