= Péter Bíró =

Péter Bíró may refer to:

- Péter Bíró (footballer, born 1985)
- Péter Bíró (footballer, born 1997)
