= Haris Tabaković =

Bosnian footballer (born 1994)

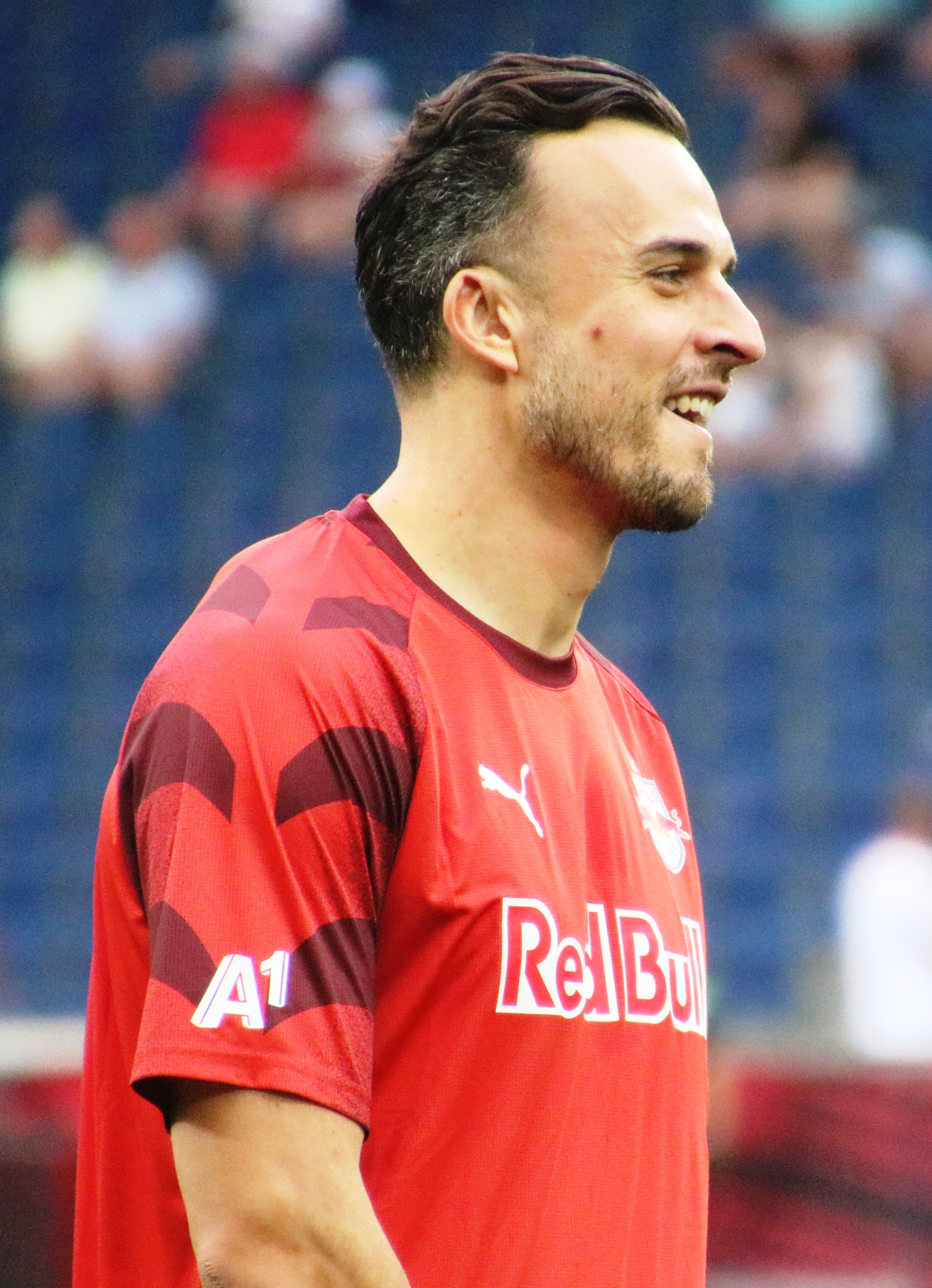
- Tabaković with Red Bull Salzburg in 2026

Personal information
- Date of birth: 20 June 1994 (age 32)
- Place of birth: Grenchen, Switzerland
- Height: 1.96 m (6 ft 5 in)
- Position: Forward

Team information
- Current team: Red Bull Salzburg
- Number: 9

Youth career
- Young Boys

Senior career*
Years	Team	Apps	(Gls)
2012–2016	Young Boys	22	(1)
2014–2015	→ Wil (loan)	24	(11)
2016–2017	Grasshoppers	34	(2)
2017–2019	Debrecen	20	(12)
2019–2020	Diósgyőr	20	(2)
2020–2022	Austria Lustenau	46	(45)
2022–2023	Austria Wien	29	(17)
2023–2024	Hertha BSC	34	(22)
2024–2026	TSG Hoffenheim	22	(3)
2025–2026	→ Borussia Mönchengladbach (loan)	32	(13)
2026–	Red Bull Salzburg	11	(8)

International career^{‡}
2012	Switzerland U18	2	(0)
2012–2013	Switzerland U19	8	(0)
2013–2016	Switzerland U21	15	(6)
2023–	Bosnia and Herzegovina	16	(5)
- * Club domestic league appearances and goals as of 8 November 2026 ‡ National team caps and goals as of 14 November 2026

Haris Tabaković (pronounced [xâːris tǎbakoʋitɕ]; born 20 June 1994) is a professional footballer who plays as a forward for Austrian Bundesliga club Red Bull Salzburg. Born in Switzerland, he plays for the Bosnia and Herzegovina national team.

Tabaković started his professional career at Young Boys, who loaned him to Wil in 2014. Two years later, he joined Grasshoppers. The following year, he moved to Debrecen. In 2019, he signed with Diósgyőr. Tabaković joined Austria Lustenau in 2020. In 2022, he switched to Austria Wien. A year later, he was transferred to Hertha BSC. The following year, he moved to TSG Hoffenheim, who sent him on loan to Borussia Mönchengladbach the following year. He signed with Red Bull Salzburg in 2026.

A former Swiss youth international, Tabaković made his senior international debut for Bosnia and Herzegovina in 2023, earning 11 caps since.

== Club career ==
=== Early career ===
Tabaković came through the youth academy of Young Boys. He made his professional debut against Luzern on 7 October 2012 at the age of 18. On 14 September 2013, he scored his first professional goal in a triumph over Young Fellows Juventus. In January 2014, he was sent on a 18-month loan to Wil. In January 2016, he joined Grasshoppers.

In August 2017, Tabaković signed with Hungarian team Debrecen. In June 2019, he switched to Diósgyőr.

In September 2020, he joined Austrian side Austria Lustenau. He scored his first career hat-trick against Lafnitz on 23 May 2021. In March 2022, he moved to Austria Wien.

=== Hertha BSC ===
In August 2023, Tabaković signed a three-year deal with German outfit Hertha BSC. He made his official debut for the team on 4 August against Wehen Wiesbaden. On 12 August, he scored his first goal for Hertha BSC in a DFB-Pokal game against Carl Zeiss Jena. Two weeks later, he scored a brace in a defeat of Greuther Fürth, which were his first league goals for the squad.

Tabaković scored his first hat-trick for the club in a victory over Eintracht Braunschweig on 17 September. With 22 goals, he finished the 2023–24 season as 2. Bundesliga top scorer.

=== TSG Hoffenheim ===
In August 2024, Tabaković was transferred to TSG Hoffenheim for an undisclosed fee. He made his competitive debut for the side against Eintracht Frankfurt on 31 August. On 19 October, he scored his first goal for TSG Hoffenheim in a win over VfL Bochum.

==== Loan to Borussia Mönchengladbach ====
In July 2025, he was loaned to Borussia Mönchengladbach until the end of the season. He concluded the season as his club's top scorer with 13 league goals, including one on the final matchday against his parent club, Hoffenheim.

=== Red Bull Salzburg ===
In July 2026, Tabaković moved to Red Bull Salzburg on a contract until June 2029. He debuted officially for the team on 1 August against Hartberg. On 6 August, he scored his first goal for Red Bull Salzburg in a UEFA Europa League qualifier against Pafos. A week later, on 13 August, he scored his first hat-trick with the club in a 3–3 away draw in the second leg against Pafos.

== International career ==
Despite representing Switzerland at various youth levels, Tabaković decided to play for Bosnia and Herzegovina at the senior level.

In November 2023, his request to change sports citizenship from Swiss to Bosnian was approved by FIFA. Earlier that month, he received his first senior call up, for UEFA Euro 2024 qualifiers against Luxembourg and Slovakia. He debuted against the former on 16 November.

On 12 October, in a friendly game against Malta, he scored his first senior international goal.

In June 2026, Tabaković was named in Bosnia and Herzegovina's squad for the 2026 FIFA World Cup. Shortly before the tournament, he suffered a metatarsal fracture but opted against surgery, choosing conservative treatment with a protective boot in hopes of recovering in time for the World Cup. He made his tournament debut in the Round of 32 match against the United States on 1 July.

== Personal life ==
Tabaković married his long-time girlfriend Sabrina in June 2024.

He is a practising Muslim; together with international teammates Ermedin Demirović, Jusuf Gazibegović, Nihad Mujakić, Haris Hajradinović, Dženis Burnić, Sead Kolašinac, Enver Kulašin, Nail Omerović, Benjamin Tahirović, Osman Hadžikić and Ermin Bičakčić he visited a mosque in Ilidža during the national team's concentration.

== Career statistics ==
=== Club ===
As of match played 8 November 2026

Appearances and goals by club, season and competition
Club	Season	League			National cup (Note: Includes Swiss Cup, Magyar Kupa, Austrian Cup, DFB-Pokal)		Continental		Other		Total	
Club	Season	Division	Apps	Goals	Apps	Goals	Apps	Goals	Apps	Goals	Apps	Goals
Young Boys	2012–13	Swiss Super League	7	0	1	0	0	0	–		8	0
Young Boys	2013–14	Swiss Super League	4	0	1	1	–		–		5	1
Young Boys	2015–16	Swiss Super League	11	1	2	0	1 (Note: Appearance(s) in UEFA Europa League)	0	–		14	1
Young Boys	Total		22	1	4	1	1	0	–		27	2
Wil (loan)	2013–14	Swiss Challenge League	14	8	–		–		–		14	8
Wil (loan)	2014–15	Swiss Challenge League	10	3	1	2	–		–		11	5
Wil (loan)	Total		24	11	1	2	–		–		25	13
Grasshoppers	2015–16	Swiss Super League	15	1	–		–		–		15	1
Grasshoppers	2016–17	Swiss Super League	19	1	3	1	4	1	–		26	3
Grasshoppers	Total		34	2	3	1	4	1	–		41	4
Debrecen	2017–18	Nemzeti Bajnokság I	20	12	5	1	–		–		25	13
Diósgyőr	2019–20	Nemzeti Bajnokság I	20	2	1	0	–		–		21	2
Austria Lustenau	2020–21	2. Liga	23	18	–		–		–		23	18
Austria Lustenau	2021–22	2. Liga	23	27	2	1	–		–		25	28
Austria Lustenau	Total		46	45	2	1	–		–		48	46
Austria Wien	2022–23	Austrian Bundesliga	28	17	2	1	7 (Note: Two appearances in UEFA Europa League; five appearances in UEFA Conference League)	0	2 (Note: Appearances in Austrian Bundesliga play-offs for UEFA Conference League)	1	39	19
Austria Wien	2023–24	Austrian Bundesliga	1	0	1	1	1 (Note: Appearance in UEFA Conference League)	1	–		3	2
Austria Wien	Total		29	17	3	2	8	1	2	1	42	21
Hertha BSC	2023–24	2. Bundesliga	32	22	4	3	–		–		36	25
Hertha BSC	2024–25	2. Bundesliga	2	0	1	0	–		–		3	0
Hertha BSC	Total		34	22	5	3	–		–		39	25
TSG Hoffenheim	2024–25	Bundesliga	22	3	2	1	5	0	–		29	4
Borussia Mönchengladbach (loan)	2025–26	Bundesliga	32	13	3	2	–		–		35	15
Red Bull Salzburg	2026–27	Austrian Bundesliga	11	8	2	1	8	6	–		21	15
Career total			294	136	31	15	26	8	2	1	353	160

=== International ===
As of match played 14 November 2026

Appearances and goals by national team and year
National team	Year	Apps	Goals
Bosnia and Herzegovina
Bosnia and Herzegovina	2023	1	0
Bosnia and Herzegovina	2024	4	0
Bosnia and Herzegovina	2025	3	3
Bosnia and Herzegovina	2026	8	2
Total		16	5

Scores and results list Bosnia and Herzegovina's goal tally first, score column indicates score after each Tabaković goal.

List of international goals scored by Haris Tabaković
No.	Date	Venue	Cap	Opponent	Score	Result	Competition
1	12 October 2025	National Stadium, Ta' Qali, Malta	6	Malta	2–0	4–1	Friendly
2	15 November 2025	Bilino Polje, Zenica, Bosnia and Herzegovina	7	Romania	3–1	3–1	2026 FIFA World Cup qualification
3	18 November 2025	Ernst-Happel-Stadion, Vienna, Austria	8	Austria	1–0	1–1	2026 FIFA World Cup qualification
4	31 March 2026	Bilino Polje, Zenica, Bosnia and Herzegovina	10	Italy	1–1	1–1	2026 FIFA World Cup play-offs
5	28 September 2026	Arena Națională, Bucharest, Romania	13	Romania	3–1	4–2	2026–27 UEFA Nations League B

== Honours ==
Austria Lustenau

- 2. Liga: 2021–22

Individual

- 2. Liga top goalscorer: 2021–22
- 2. Bundesliga top goalscorer: 2023–24
