= Tomáš Košický =

Slovak footballer

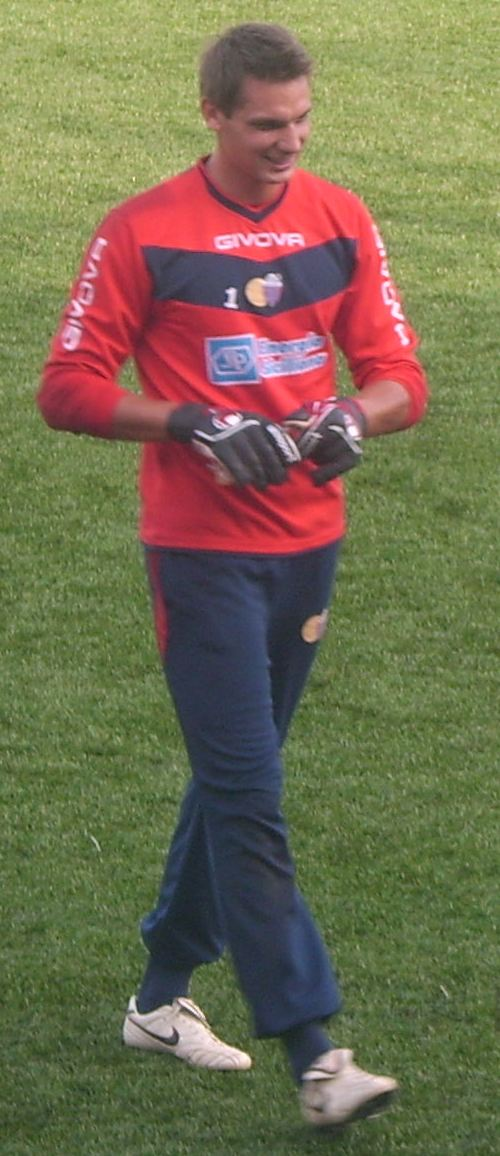

Personal information
- Date of birth: 11 March 1986 (age 40)
- Place of birth: Bratislava, Slovakia, Czechoslovakia
- Height: 1.97 m (6 ft 6 in)
- Position: Goalkeeper

Team information
- Current team: Vítkovice

Youth career
- 1997–2005: Inter Bratislava

Senior career*
Years	Team	Apps	(Gls)
2005–2008	Inter Bratislava	12	(0)
2008–2012	Catania	9	(0)
2012–2014	Novara	48	(0)
2014–2017	Asteras Tripolis	32	(0)
2017–2018	Hapoel Ra'anana	9	(0)
2018–2022	Debrecen	36	(0)
2023–	Vítkovice	1	(0)

International career^{‡}
2013	Slovakia	1	(0)
- * Club domestic league appearances and goals as of 4 March 2023 ‡ National team caps and goals as of 19 November 2013

Tomáš Košický (born 11 March 1986) is a Slovak goalkeeper who plays for Czech club Vítkovice.

== Club career ==
In April 2009, the first-choice goalkeeper, Albano Bizzarri, did not renew his contract with Catania, and thus head coach Walter Zenga opted to use Košický as the starting keeper in order for the Slovak to gain experience. Košický even served as captain for Catania in the 16 May 2009 Serie A fixture against AS Roma.

On 22 July 2014, Košický officially transferred to Super League Greece side Asteras Tripolis. In early 2023, Košický joined third-tier Czech club Vítkovice.

== International career ==
On 19 November 2013, Košický became one of the debutants for the Slovakia national football team in a goalless draw against Gibraltar.
