= Oļegs Timofejevs =

Latvian footballer

Personal information
- Date of birth: 28 November 1988 (age 37)
- Place of birth: Daugavpils, Latvian SSR, Soviet Union (now Republic of Latvia)
- Height: 1.82 m (6 ft 0 in)
- Position: Midfielder

Youth career
- –2006: Dinaburg Daugavpils

Senior career*
Years	Team	Apps	(Gls)
2006–2011	Daugava Daugavpils	53	(0)
2009	→ Dinaburg Daugavpils (loan)	4	(0)
2012–2014	Ventspils	92	(0)
2015	Skonto FC	22	(2)
2016–2017	Riga	43	(1)

International career
2012	Latvia U21	4	(0)
2014	Latvia	3	(0)
- * Club domestic league appearances and goals as of 15 January 2018

Oļegs Timofejevs (born 28 November 1988) is a Latvian football defender, who last played Riga FC in the Latvian Higher League.

== Club career ==
Since December 2015, he is on trial with Czech Synot liga side FC Zbrojovka Brno.

== Honours ==
=== FK Ventspils ===
- Latvian champion
  - 2013, 2014
