= Aleksandar Trninić =

Serbian footballer

Personal information
- Date of birth: March 27, 1987 (age 39)
- Place of birth: Belgrade, SFR Yugoslavia
- Height: 1.90 m (6 ft 3 in)
- Positions: Centre-back; defensive midfielder

Team information
- Current team: BSK 1926 Baćevac

Youth career
- 2004–2005: Cham
- 2005–2007: Rad

Senior career*
Years	Team	Apps	(Gls)
2004	Cham	0	(0)
2005–2008	Rad	23	(0)
2005–2006	→ Radnički Obrenovac (loan)	18	(0)
2007	→ Palilulac Beograd (loan)	14	(2)
2008–2009	Spartak Subotica	0	(0)
2009	→ Čukarički (loan)	2	(0)
2009	Leotar	14	(0)
2010	Čukarički	18	(0)
2011–2012	Michalovce	12	(0)
2012–2013	Čukarički	44	(3)
2013–2014	Debrecen	10	(0)
2014	Vardar	5	(0)
2014	Radnički Niš	1	(0)
2015–2016	Rad	18	(2)
2016–2018	KA Akureyri	58	(7)
2019	Al-Shabab		
2019–2021	Rad	38	(2)
2021	Radnički Beograd	0	(0)
2022-	BSK 1926 Baćevac		
- * Club domestic league appearances and goals as of 19 May 2021

Aleksandar Trninić (Serbian Cyrillic: Александар Трнинић; born 27 March 1987) is a Serbian football defensive midfielder who plays for BSK 1926 Baćevac.

== Career ==
In 2019, Trninić joined Al-Shabab in Kuwait.

== Club statistics ==
Club	Season	League		Cup		League Cup		Europe		Total	
Club	Season	Apps	Goals	Apps	Goals	Apps	Goals	Apps	Goals	Apps	Goals
Rad	2007–08	11	0	0	0	0	0	0	0	11	0
Rad	Total	11	0	0	0	0	0	0	0	11	0
Čukarički	2008–09	2	0	0	0	0	0	0	0	2	0
Čukarički	2009–10	9	0	0	0	0	0	0	0	9	0
Čukarički	2010–11	9	0	0	0	0	0	0	0	9	0
Čukarički	2011–12	16	3	0	0	0	0	0	0	16	3
Čukarički	2012–13	28	0	2	0	0	0	0	0	30	0
Čukarički	Total	64	3	2	0	0	0	0	0	66	3
Leotar	2009–10	14	0	0	0	0	0	0	0	14	0
Leotar	Total	14	0	0	0	0	0	0	0	14	0
Michalovce	2011–12	12	0	0	0	0	0	0	0	12	0
Michalovce	Total	12	0	0	0	0	0	0	0	12	0
Debrecen	2013–14	10	0	1	0	3	0	2	0	16	0
Debrecen	Total	10	0	1	0	3	0	2	0	16	0
Career total		111	3	3	0	3	0	2	0	119	3
