= Justin Mengolo =

Cameroonian footballer

Personal information
- Full name: Justin Junior Mengolo
- Date of birth: 24 June 1993 (age 33)
- Place of birth: Yaoundé, Cameroon
- Height: 1.82 m (6 ft 0 in)
- Positions: Winger; forward

Team information
- Current team: Al-Salt

Senior career*
Years	Team	Apps	(Gls)
2010–2012	Panthère du Ndé	0	(0)
2012–2013	Étoile du Sahel	15	(1)
2013–2014	Omonia	4	(0)
2014	→ Nea Salamina (loan)	13	(5)
2014–2015	Universitatea Cluj	28	(5)
2016	Levski Sofia	7	(0)
2017–2018	Debrecen	24	(4)
2018	Astra Giurgiu	1	(0)
2019	Gżira United	10	(6)
2020–	Al-Salt		

International career
2015	Cameroon	2	(0)
- * Club domestic league appearances and goals as of 21:42, 12 January 2021 (UTC)

Justin Junior Mengolo (born 24 June 1993) is a Cameroonian professional footballer who plays as a winger or forward for Jordanian club Al-Salt.

== Club career ==
Mengolo started his career in Cameroon with Panthère du Ndé, before moving onto Tunisian football to sign for Étoile du Sahel. One goal in fifteen appearances followed in Tunisian Ligue Professionnelle 1 for Mengolo before he left to join Cypriot First Division club Omonia in 2013. In January 2014, he departed as he joined fellow Cypriot top-tier side Nea Salamina on loan. He scored five times in seventeen appearances in Cyprus for the two aforementioned teams prior to leaving to complete a move to Universitatea Cluj in Romania's Liga I.

In January 2016, Mengolo joined Levski Sofia in Bulgaria but left five months later. He was a free agent from July 2016 to January 2017 when he signed for Nemzeti Bajnokság I side Debrecen. He left the team at the end of the 2017/18 season.

On 28 September 2018, Mengolo signed for Romanian club Astra Giurgiu.

In December 2018, Mengolo signed for Maltese Premier League leaders, Gzira United FC. In February 2020, Mengolo then moved to Al-Salt in Jordan.

== International career ==
Mengolo has won two caps for the Cameroon national team, both caps came in June 2015.

== Career statistics ==
=== Club ===
As of 8 May 2018

Club statistics
Club	Season	League			Cup (Note: Includes the Magyar Kupa.)		League Cup		Continental (Note: Includes the UEFA Champions League and UEFA Europa League.)		Other		Total	
Club	Season	Division	Apps	Goals	Apps	Goals	Apps	Goals	Apps	Goals	Apps	Goals	Apps	Goals
Étoile du Sahel	2012–13	Tunisian Ligue Professionnelle 1	15	1	—		—		4	0	0	0	19	1
Étoile du Sahel	Total		15	1	0	0	0	0	4	0	0	0	19	1
Omonia Nicosia	2013–14	Cypriot First Division	4	0	3	0	—		—		0	0	7	0
Omonia Nicosia	Total		4	0	3	0	0	0	0	0	0	0	7	0
Nea Salamis	2013–14	Cypriot First Division	13	5	0	0	—		—		0	0	13	5
Nea Salamis	Total		13	5	0	0	0	0	0	0	0	0	13	5
Universitatea Cluj	2014–15	Liga I	28	5	5	0	1	0	—		0	0	34	5
Universitatea Cluj	Total		28	5	5	0	1	0	0	0	0	0	34	5
Levski Sofia	2015–16	A Group	7	0	0	0	—		0	0	0	0	7	0
Levski Sofia	Total		7	0	0	0	0	0	0	0	0	0	7	0
Debrecen	2016–17	Nemzeti Bajnokság I	5	0	0	0	—		—		0	0	5	0
Debrecen	2017–18	Nemzeti Bajnokság I	18	4	3	1	—		—		0	0	21	5
Debrecen	Total		24	4	3	1	0	0	0	0	0	0	27	6
Career total			96	15	11	1	1	0	4	0	0	0	112	17

== Honours ==
=== Club ===
Étoile du Sahel

- Tunisian Cup: 2011–12
