= Dušan Brković =

Serbian association football player

Dušan Brković Душан Брковић
Personal information
- Full name: Dušan Brković
- Date of birth: 20 January 1989 (age 37)
- Place of birth: Titovo Užice, SFR Yugoslavia
- Height: 1.82 m (6 ft 0 in)
- Position: Centre-back

Team information
- Current team: Leiknir
- Number: 25

Youth career
- Partizan

Senior career*
Years	Team	Apps	(Gls)
2007–2010	Partizan	0	(0)
2007–2009	→ Teleoptik (loan)	65	(3)
2010	→ Hajduk Kula (loan)	13	(0)
2010–2012	Smederevo	56	(0)
2012–2013	Hapoel Haifa	30	(1)
2013–2017	Debrecen	116	(8)
2017	Riga	8	(0)
2018–2020	Diósgyőr	71	(9)
2021–2023	KA Akureyri	65	(1)
2024	FH Hafnarfjarðar	7	(0)
2024–	Leiknir	21	(1)

International career
2005–2006	Serbia and Montenegro U17 (Note: Only official UEFA matches included)	9	(1)
2007–2008	Serbia U19	5	(0)
2010	Serbia U21	1	(0)
- * Club domestic league appearances and goals as of 15 October 2025

Dušan Brković (Serbian Cyrillic: Душан Брковић; born 20 January 1989) is a Serbian professional footballer who plays as a defender for Icelandic club Leiknir.

== Club career ==
Born in Titovo Užice, Brković came through the youth system at Partizan, but never made it into the senior squad. He was instead loaned to affiliated club Teleoptik in order to gain experience. Before moving abroad, Brković made his Serbian SuperLiga debuts with Hajduk Kula and Smederevo.

In the summer of 2012, Brković signed for Israeli club Hapoel Haifa. He spent one year there, winning the Toto Cup, before moving to Hungarian side Debrecen. In his debut season at the club, Brković helped them win the league title.

After a brief spell at Latvian club Riga, Brković returned to Hungary and joined Diósgyőr in the 2018 winter transfer window. He spent there two and a half years, becoming leader of the team and captain. After expiring of the contract he left the Hangary.

== International career ==
Brković represented Serbia and Montenegro at the 2006 UEFA Under-17 Championship. His only appearance for the Serbia U21s came in a 0–3 friendly loss away to Romania U21 on 26 May 2010.

== Honours ==
Hapoel Haifa

- Toto Cup: 2012–13

Debrecen

- Nemzeti Bajnokság I: 2013–14
- Ligakupa: Runner-up 2014–15
- Szuperkupa: Runner-up 2013, 2014
