= Ádám Kovács (footballer) =

Hungarian footballer (born 1991)

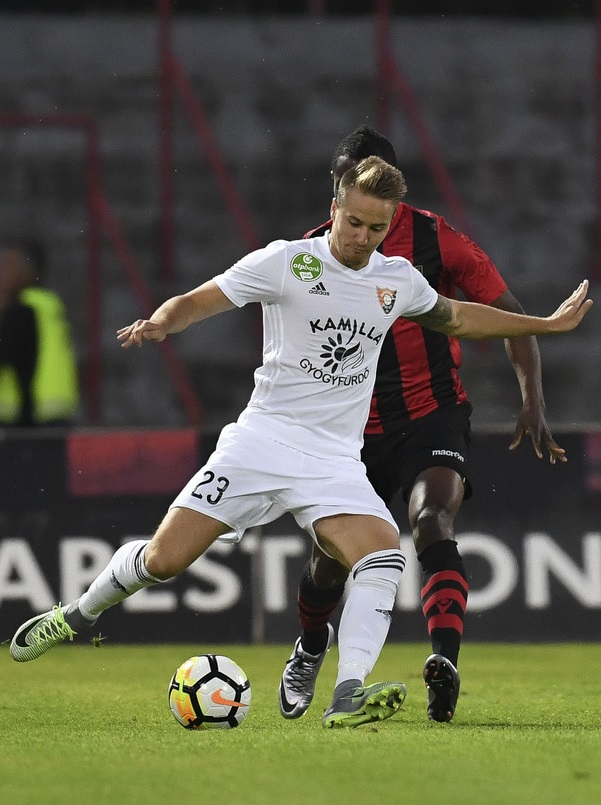
- Kovács playing for Balmazújváros in 2017

Personal information
- Full name: Ádám Tibor Kovács
- Date of birth: 14 April 1991 (age 35)
- Place of birth: Budapest, Hungary
- Height: 1.80 m (5 ft 11 in)
- Position: Forward

Team information
- Current team: Szakoly

Youth career
- 2005–2006: Újpest FC
- 2006–2007: III. Kerületi TUE
- 2007–2010: OH Leuven

Senior career*
Years	Team	Apps	(Gls)
2010–2011	OH Leuven	1	(0)
2011	Budapest Honvéd II	10	(2)
2011–2012	Nyíregyháza	14	(5)
2012	Vasas	5	(1)
2012–2014	Nyíregyháza	12	(3)
2013	→ Kecskemét II (loan)	3	(0)
2013	→ Nyírbátor (loan)	18	(9)
2014–2015	Debrecen	0	(0)
2014–2015	→ Soproni (loan)	22	(6)
2015–2016	Győr	3	(0)
2016–2018	Balmazújváros	59	(12)
2018	Zalaegerszeg	8	(0)
2018–2019	Mosonmagyaróvár	23	(3)
2019–2021	Békéscsaba	52	(5)
2022	Nyíregyháza	13	(3)
2023	Sényő		
2024	Mátészalka		
2024	Újfehértó	12	(8)
2025–	Szakoly		
- * Club domestic league appearances and goals as of 1 May 2022

Ádám Tibor Kovács (born 14 April 1991) is a Hungarian professional footballer who plays for Szakoly in the Megyei Bajnokság II, county Szabolcs-Szatmár-Bereg.
