= Tamás Takács (footballer, born 1991) =

Hungarian footballer

- Takács playing for Tiszakécske in 2026

Personal information
- Date of birth: 20 February 1991 (age 35)
- Place of birth: Subotica, SFR Yugoslavia
- Height: 1.96 m (6 ft 5 in)
- Position: Forward

Team information
- Current team: Tiszakécske
- Number: 9

Youth career
- Vinogradar
- Subotica
- Zlatibor Voda

Senior career*
Years	Team	Apps	(Gls)
2009–2010	Kozármisleny	14	(3)
2010–2013	OFK Beograd	15	(2)
2012	→ Bačka Topola (loan)	4	(0)
2013–2014	Szigetszentmiklós	32	(13)
2014–2016	Diósgyőr	38	(5)
2016–2019	Debrecen	78	(22)
2017	→ Nyíregyháza (loan)	12	(4)
2019–2021	Mezőkövesd	15	(0)
2020	→ Szeged-Csanád (loan)	13	(3)
2021	Kazincbarcika	12	(2)
2021–2022	Csákvár	22	(13)
2022–2023	Kazincbarcika	23	(1)
2023	Mosonmagyaróvár	16	(4)
2024–	Tiszakécske	60	(17)
- * Club domestic league appearances and goals as of 31 May 2026

Tamás Takács (Serbian: Tamaš Takač / Тамаш Такач; born 20 February 1991) is a Hungarian football striker who plays for Tiszakécske.

== Career ==
Born in Subotica, SFR Yugoslavia, he played with FK Vinogradar, FK Subotica and FK Spartak Zlatibor Voda before joining Hungarian side Kozármisleny SE where he played until the end of the 2009–10 NB II season. In mid-2010 he signed with OFK Beograd and after playing two seasons in the Serbian SuperLiga, he was loaned, in mid-2012, to TSC Bačka Topola playing in the Serbian League Vojvodina.

On 29 June 2022, Takács returned to Kazincbarcika.

== Club statistics ==
As of 27 June 2020

Club	Season	League			Cup		League Cup		Europe		Total	
Club	Season	Division	Apps	Goals	Apps	Goals	Apps	Goals	Apps	Goals	Apps	Goals
Kozármisleny	2009–10	Nemzeti Bajnokság II	14	3	1	0	—		—		15	3
OFK Beograd	2010–11	Serbian SuperLiga	1	0	—		—		—		1	0
OFK Beograd	2011–12	Serbian SuperLiga	12	2	3	2	—		—		15	4
OFK Beograd	2012–13	Serbian SuperLiga	1	0	—		—		—		1	0
OFK Beograd	Total		14	2	3	2	0	0	0	0	16	4
Szigetszentmiklós	2012–13	Nemzeti Bajnokság II	6	3	—		—		—		6	3
Szigetszentmiklós	2013–14	Nemzeti Bajnokság II	26	10	2	0	7	3	—		35	13
Szigetszentmiklós	Total		32	13	2	0	7	3	0	0	41	16
Diósgyőr	2014–15	Nemzeti Bajnokság I	26	5	4	3	5	4	1	0	36	12
Diósgyőr	2015–16	Nemzeti Bajnokság I	12	0	2	0	—		—		14	0
Diósgyőr	Total		38	5	6	3	5	4	1	0	50	12
Nyíregyháza	2016–17	Nemzeti Bajnokság II	12	4	—		—		—		12	4
Debrecen	2015–16	Nemzeti Bajnokság I	10	5	3	3	—		—		13	8
Debrecen	2016–17	Nemzeti Bajnokság I	11	2	1	0	—		2	0	14	2
Debrecen	2017–18	Nemzeti Bajnokság I	25	9	7	2	—		—		32	11
Debrecen	2018–19	Nemzeti Bajnokság I	32	6	7	3	—		—		39	9
Debrecen	2019–20	Nemzeti Bajnokság I	0	0	0	0	—		1	0	1	0
Debrecen	Total		78	22	18	8	0	0	3	0	99	31
Mezőkövesd	2019–20	Nemzeti Bajnokság I	15	0	7	3	—		—		22	3
Career total			203	49	37	16	12	7	4	0	255	72
