= Péter Bíró (footballer, born 1997) =

Hungarian footballer

Personal information
- Date of birth: 4 November 1997 (age 29)
- Place of birth: Debrecen, Hungary
- Height: 1.87 m (6 ft 2 in)
- Position: Forward

Team information
- Current team: Tiszafüred

Youth career
- 2003–2015: Debrecen

Senior career*
Years	Team	Apps	(Gls)
2015–2018	Debrecen	2	(0)
2015–2017	→ Debrecen II	49	(21)
2018–2021	DEAC		
2021–	Tiszafüred		
- * Club domestic league appearances and goals as of 9 December 2017

Péter Bíró (born 4 November 1997) is a Hungarian football player who plays for Tiszafüred.

== Career ==
=== Debrecen ===
On 22 July 2017, Bíró played his first match for Debrecen in a 0–1 loss against Szombathelyi Haladás in the Hungarian League.

== Career statistics ==
As of 9 December 2017

Appearances and goals by club, season and competition
Club	Season	League			Cup		Europe		Total	
Club	Season	Division	Apps	Goals	Apps	Goals	Apps	Goals	Apps	Goals
Debrecen II
Debrecen II	2015–16	Nemzeti Bajnokság III	14	2	0	0	—		14	2
Debrecen II	2016–17	Nemzeti Bajnokság III	26	10	0	0	—		26	10
Debrecen II	2017–18	Megyei Bajnokság I	9	9	0	0	—		9	9
Debrecen II	Total		49	21	0	0	0	0	49	21
Debrecen	2017–18	Nemzeti Bajnokság I	2	0	2	1	—		4	1
Career total			51	21	2	1	0	0	53	22
