= Aleksandar Jovanović (footballer, born 1984) =

Bosnian Serb footballer

Personal information
- Date of birth: 26 October 1984 (age 41)
- Place of birth: Sarajevo, SFR Yugoslavia
- Height: 1.75 m (5 ft 9 in)
- Position: Midfielder

Senior career*
Years	Team	Apps	(Gls)
2002–2005	Leotar		
2005–2011	Hajduk Kula	87	(4)
2011–2014	Ferencváros	70	(1)
2014–2019	Debrecen	163	(9)
2019–2021	Szeged-Csanád	40	(4)

International career
2002	Bosnia and Herzegovina U19	3	(0)
2004	Bosnia and Herzegovina U21	7	(0)
- * Club domestic league appearances and goals as of 9 May 2021

Aleksandar Jovanović (Serbian Cyrillic: Александар Јовановић; born 26 October 1984) is a Bosnian professional footballer.

== Club career ==
He played with FK Leotar where started playing as a senior. In 2005, he moved to Serbia where signed with SuperLiga club FK Hajduk Kula where he played until 2011.

Ahead of the 2019/20 season, Jovanović joined Szeged 2011.

== Club statistics ==
Club	Season	League		Cup		League Cup		Europe		Total	
Club	Season	Apps	Goals	Apps	Goals	Apps	Goals	Apps	Goals	Apps	Goals
Hajduk Kula	2007–08	18	1	1	0	0	0	0	0	19	1
Hajduk Kula	2008–09	26	1	0	0	0	0	0	0	26	1
Hajduk Kula	2009–10	14	0	0	0	0	0	0	0	14	0
Hajduk Kula	2010–11	27	2	0	0	0	0	0	0	27	2
Hajduk Kula	Total	85	4	1	0	0	0	0	0	86	4
Ferencváros	2011–12	25	1	3	0	0	0	3	0	31	1
Ferencváros	2012–13	16	0	1	0	5	0	0	0	22	0
Ferencváros	2013–14	20	0	2	0	11	0	0	0	33	0
Ferencváros	Total	61	1	6	0	16	0	3	0	86	1
Debrecen	2014–15	26	1	2	0	4	1	6	0	38	2
Debrecen	2015–16	29	3	6	0	–	–	6	0	41	3
Debrecen	2016–17	30	2	0	0	–	–	4	0	34	2
Debrecen	2017–18	27	2	6	0	–	–	–	–	33	2
Debrecen	2018–19	15	0	6	1	–	–	–	–	21	1
Career total		273	13	27	1	20	1	19	0	339	15

== Honours ==
Ferencváros

- Hungarian League Cup (1): 2012–13
