= Péter Szilvási =

Hungarian footballer

Personal information
- Date of birth: 20 June 1994 (age 32)
- Place of birth: Nyíregyháza, Hungary
- Height: 1.92 m (6 ft 3 1/2 in)
- Position: Defender

Youth career
- 2002–2009: Nyíregyháza
- 2009–2012: Honvéd
- 2012–2013: Greuther Fürth

Senior career*
| Years | Team | Apps | (Gls) |
| 2012–2015 | Greuther Fürth II | 72 | (2) |
| 2015–2018 | Debrecen | 2 | (0) |
| 2015–2018 | → Debrecen II | 30 | (4) |
| 2016 | → Mezőkövesd (loan) | 9 | (0) |
| 2018–2020 | Gyirmót | 54 | (2) |
| 2020 | Tiszaújváros | | |
| 2020–2021 | Szeged-Csanád | 21 | (0) |
| 2021 | Sényő | | |

International career
| 2010–2011 | Hungary U-17 | 6 | (0) |
| 2012 | Hungary U-19 | 3 | (0) |
| 2015–2016 | Hungary U-21 | 10 | (0) |
- * Club domestic league appearances and goals

Péter Szilvási (born 20 June 1994) is a Hungarian former football defender.
