= Sóstói Stadion =

Multi-purpose stadium in Székesfehérvár, Hungary

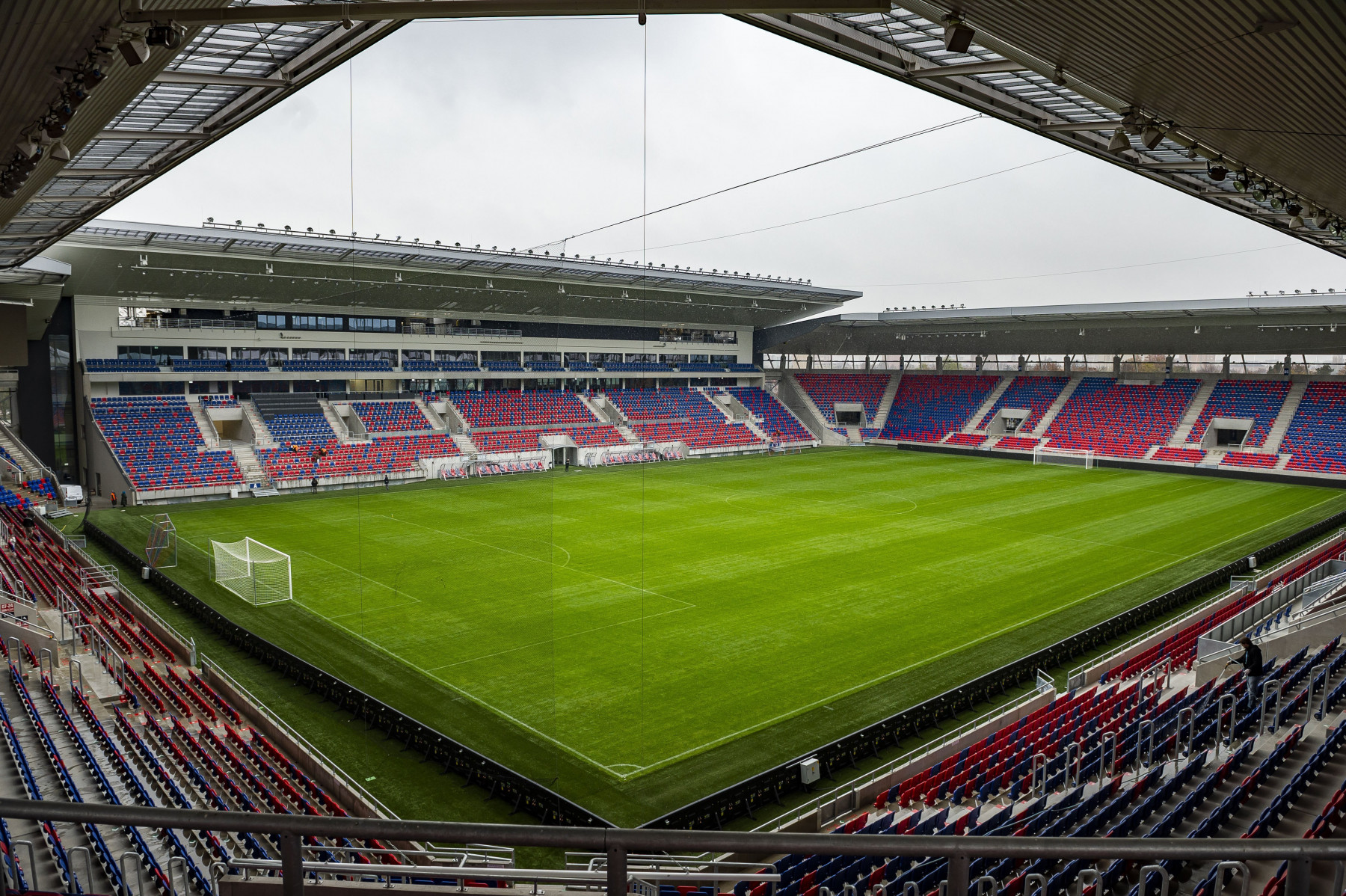
- UEFA
- Interactive map of Sóstói Stadion
- Coordinates: 47°10′25″N 18°24′55″E
- Operator: Városfejlesztesési Kft.
- Capacity: 14,201
- Surface: Grass
- Record attendance: 11,251 (MOL Vidi v Újpest; 28 November 2018)
- Field size: 105 x 68 m

Construction
- Groundbreaking: 2016
- Built: 2016–2018
- Opened: 21 November 2018
- Cost: 13.98 billion HUF
- Architects: Ágnes Streit; Oktávián Burits; László Péterfy
- Project manager: Győző Kókány
- Structural engineers: László Szántó; Zoltán Hajtó; László Kovács

Tenant
- Fehérvár FC (2018–present)

Website
- Official website

Sóstói Stadion, formerly known as MOL Aréna Sóstó, (MOL Aréna Salt Lake) is a multi-purpose stadium in Székesfehérvár, Hungary, primarily used for football matches.

== History ==
=== Planning ===
On 12 November 2014, the design of the new stadium was revealed at press conference held by László Vigh and András Cser-Palkovics, mayor of Székesfehérvár. Three new stands are going to be built. The main stand is going to be renewed. The reconstruction is going to start in autumn 2015. The expected finish of the construction is going to be the end of 2016. During the 2015-16 season the club are going to play their matches at the Pancho Arena in Felcsút, Fejér County.

On 18 September 2015, it was announced that the demolition of the current stadium is going to be in January 2016.

On 10 December 2015, András Cser-Palkovics said that a totally new multi-use stadium will be built creating the Vidi-city. He emphasised the importance of the reconstruction of the neighbouring parks, routes and buildings. The demolition will kick off on 14 December 2015 and the new stadium will be opened in 2017. During that period the trainings for the club will be in Székesfehérvár. However, the Nemzeti Bajnokság I matches will be played at the Pancho Arena, in Felcsút.

=== Construction ===
On 14 October 2016, it was revealed by feol.hu that the construction might start within days as soon as the contracts are signed by all parties. The feol.hu website also adds that the opening will be further delayed due to the late start of the constructions.

On 23 November 2016 the construction officially started.

On 7 February 2017, László Horváth, project manager of Sóstó Konzorcium, said that the first phase of the construction ended. The demolition of the interior of the remaining main stand ended. The concrete of the demolished parts of the main stand will be reused in the building of the new stands. The Sóstó Konzorcium will have 14 months to finish the construction of the stadium.

On 13 March 2017, László Horváth, project manager of Sóstó Konzorcium, said that thanks to the mild winter the construction of the new stadium is in good progress. The construction of the base of the stands were finished in March.

On 27 March 2017, it was confirmed that the construction of the stadium would be finished by 16 January 2018. Péter Gönczöl, managing director of Strabag-MML Kft., said that the construction is in the most spectacular phase when the biggest panels are positioned into their places. András Cser-Palkovics, mayor of Székesfehérvár, said that due to the severe weather conditions during winter the construction could be finished by the deadline. Róbert Varga, director of Strabag-Hungary, added that the new stadium will be able to host 14,201 spectators and the stadium will be lying on a base of 10,199 square metres and the highest point of the stadium will be 21.28 metres.

On 4 April 2017 new pictures were revealed on Nemzeti Sport about the construction. It was also confirmed by the official website of Videoton that the construction will be finished by 16 January 2018.

On 18 August 2017, it was announced that the main stand should also be demolished due to statical problems. Originally, the new stadium would have been built around the main stand. Due to the reconstruction of the main stand the opening of the new stadium will be delayed to June 2018.

On 27 July 2018, it was announced that MOL Vidi FC will rent the stadium.

On 14 August 2018, an article was published on the Hungarian news website, Index.hu, stating that there will be further delays in the opening of the new stadium. One day later, it was announced that the 2018–19 UEFA Champions League play-off matches will be played at Ferencvárosi TC's home stadium, Groupama Aréna in Budapest.

=== Opening ===
The stadium was opened on 21 November 2018. The first match was played between MOL Vidi and Újpest in the 6th round of the 2018–19 Nemzeti Bajnokság I season and the match ended with a 1-0 victory for the home side. The first goal was scored by Roland Juhász in the 58th minute.

The opening of the stadium started with the performance of the Hungarian pop band Wellhello since the singer of this group, Tomi Fluor, has roots in Székesfehérvár. In addition, the members of the legendary 1958-team were also present including Péter Disztl, Gábor Horváth, and Imre Vadász. Former football coaches of Videoton FC were also present such as János Csank, Péter Bozsik, and Imre Gellei.

On 21 November 2018 the stadium was renamed as MOL Aréna Sóstó due to sponsorship reasons.

On 27 February 2019, the first Magyar Kupa match was played at the stadium. MOL Vidi FC hosted Taksony SE in the 8th round of the 2018–19 Magyar Kupa season. The match ended with a 3-0 victory for MOL Vidi. Huszti scored twice, while Anel Hadžić once. The home side qualified for the quarter-finals on 4-0 aggregate.

=== Recent ===
The stadium was selected to host the 2021 UEFA European Under-21 Championship.

In 2023, the stadium was renamed as Sóstói Stadion since the Hungarian oil company, MOL, stopped financing the club.

== Milestone matches ==
21 November 2018	Fehérvár (Hungary)	1–0	(Hungary) Újpest	(First Nemzeti Bajnokság I match)
	Juhász 58'	Report		Attendance: 11,251; Referee: Sándor Andó-Szabó (Hungary)

27 February 2019	Fehérvár (Hungary)	3–0	(Hungary) Taksony	(First Magyar Kupa match)
18:00 CET	Huszti 26' 42'; Hadžić 32'	Report		Referee: Gábor Barna

== Attendances ==
As of 11 April 2017.

Season	Average
2018–19	TBA

== Gallery ==
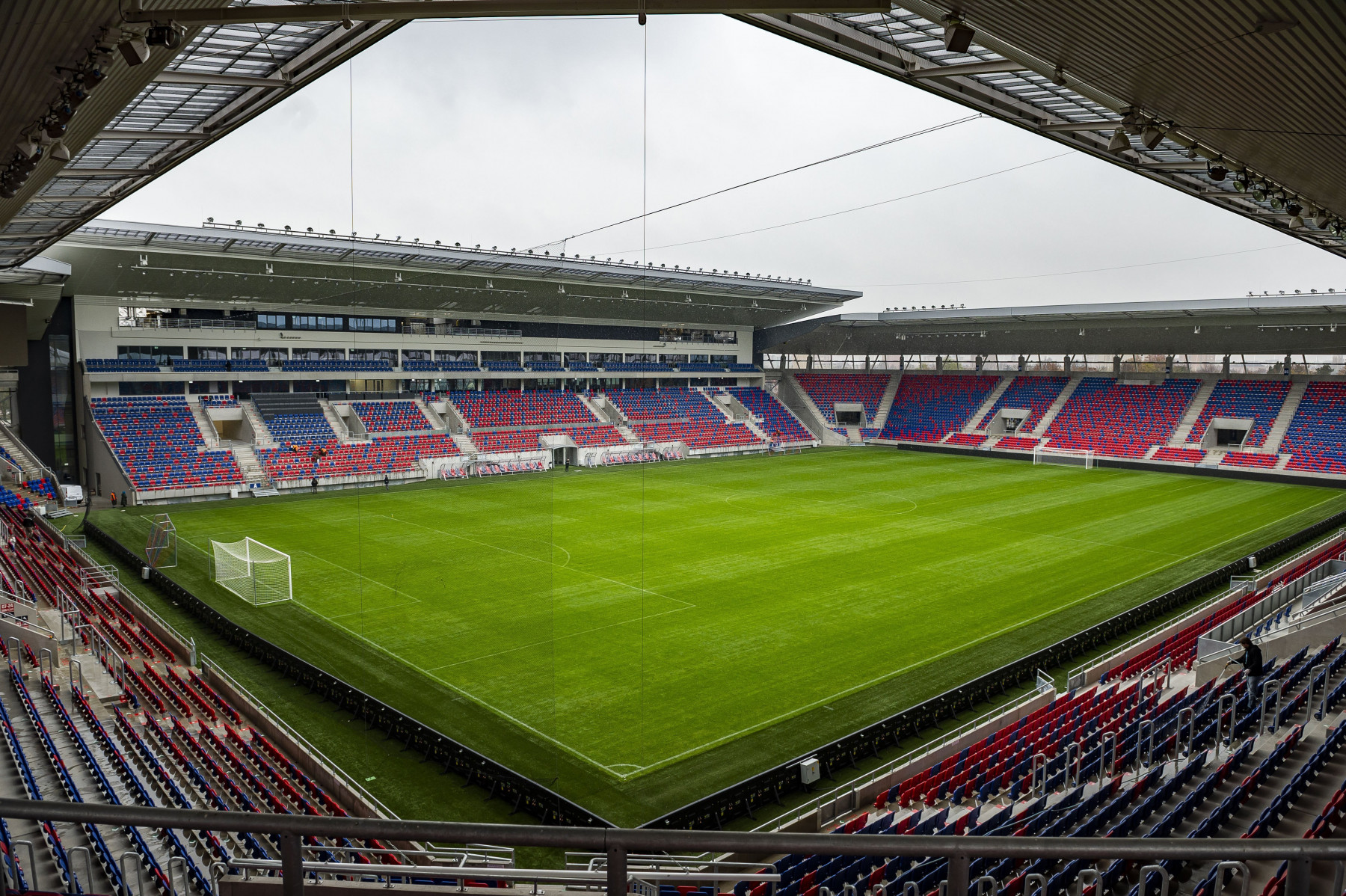

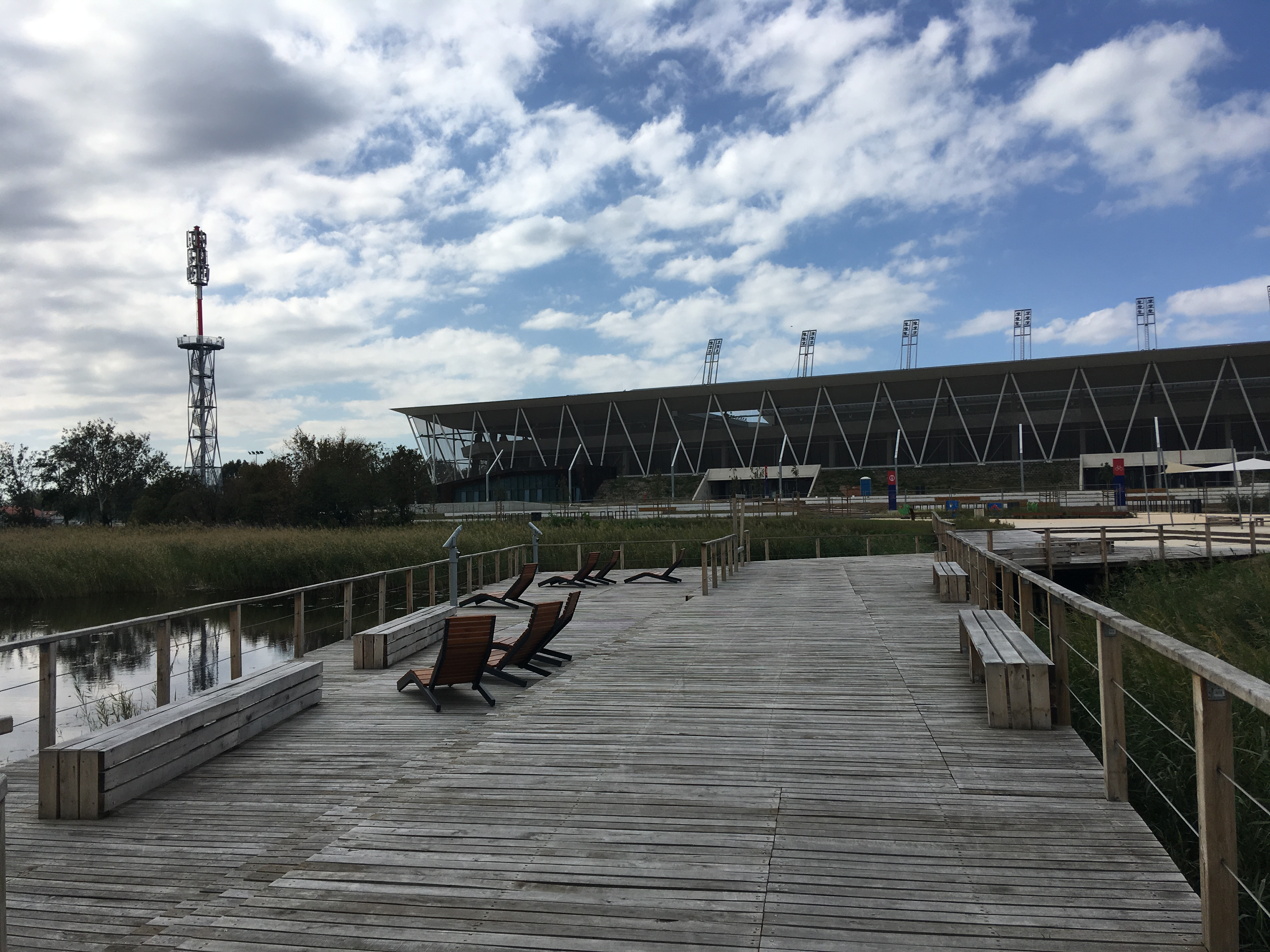

== See also ==
- List of football stadiums in Hungary
- Lists of stadiums
