= History of Székesfehérvár =

The History of Székesfehérvár, dates back to the 5th century BCE.

== Pre-Hungarian ==
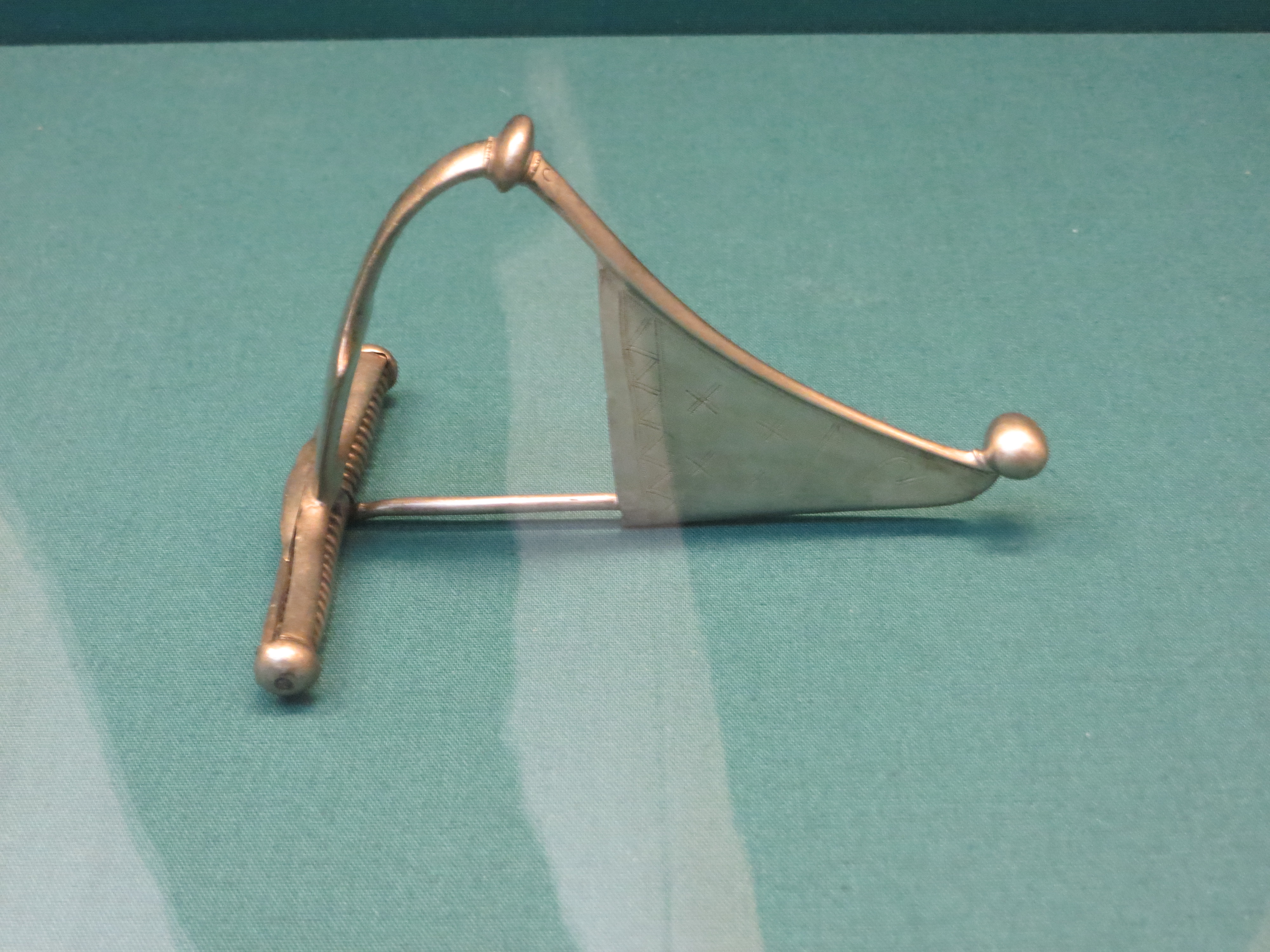
La Tène Silver hinged brooch found in Székesfehérvár, dating from 1-100 AD (British Museum).

The place has been inhabited since the 5th century BCE. In Roman times, the settlements were called Gorsium and Herculia. After the Migration Period Fejér County was the part of the Avar Khaganate, while the Slavic and Great Moravian presence is disputed. (There is no source for the name of the place before the late 10th century.) In the Middle Ages its Latin name was Alba Regalis/Alba Regia. The town was an important traffic junction between Lake Balaton and Lake Velence, several trade routes led from here to the Balkans and Italy, and to Buda and Vienna. Today, the town is a junction of seven railroad lines.

== Early Hungarian ==
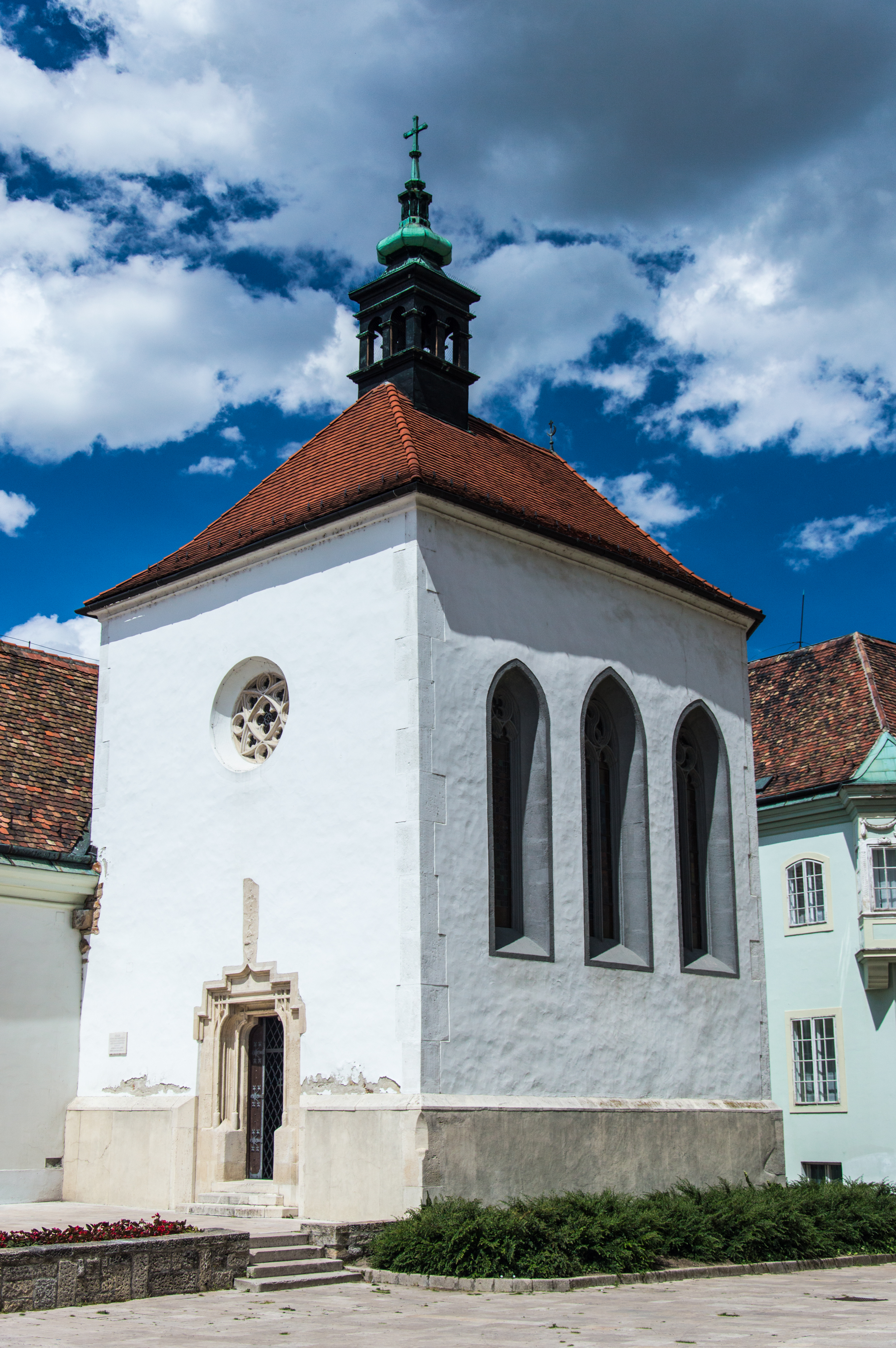
Later Gothic St. Anna Chapel, built around 1485.

Grand Prince Géza of the Árpád dynasty was the nominal overlord of all seven Magyar tribes but in reality ruled only part of the united territory. He aimed to integrate Hungary into Christian Western Europe by rebuilding the state according to the Western political and social models. Géza founded the Hungarian town in 972 on four moorland islands between the Gaja stream and its tributary, the Sárvíz, one of the most important Hungarian tributaries of the Danube. He also had a small stone castle built. Székesfehérvár was first mentioned in a document by the Bishopric of Veszprém, 1009, as Alba Civitas.

István I, Grand Prince of the Hungarians, granted town rights to the settlement, surrounded the town with a plank wall, and founded a school and a monastery. Under his rule the construction of the Romanesque Székesfehérvár Basilica began (it was built between 1003 and 1038). The settlement had about 3,500 inhabitants at this time and was the royal seat for hundreds of years. 43 kings were crowned in Székesfehérvár (the last one in 1526) and 15 kings were buried here (the last one in 1540). In the past few decades, archaeologists have excavated medieval ruins, including those of the Romanesque basilica and the mausoleum of King István I; they can now be visited.

In the 12th century, the town prospered; churches, monasteries, and houses were built. It was an important station on the pilgrim route to the Holy Land. András II issued the Golden Bull here in 1222. The Bull included the rights of nobles and the duties of the king, and the Constitution of Hungary was based on it until 1848. It is often compared to England's Magna Carta.

During the Mongol invasion of Hungary (1241–1242), the invaders could not get close to the castle: Kadan ruled Mongol warriors could not get through the surrounding marshes because of flooding caused by melting snow. In the 13th–15th centuries, the town prospered, and several palaces were built. In the 14th century, Székesfehérvár was surrounded by city walls.

After the death of King Mátyás (1490), the German army of 20,000 men led by the Holy Roman Emperor Maximilian I invaded Hungary. They advanced into the heart of Hungary and captured the city of Székesfehérvár, which they sacked, as well as the tomb of King Mátyás, which was kept there. His Landsknechts were still unsatisfied with the plunder and refused to go for taking Buda. He returned to the Empire in late December and the Hungarian troops liberated Székesfehérvár in the next year.

== Ottoman period ==
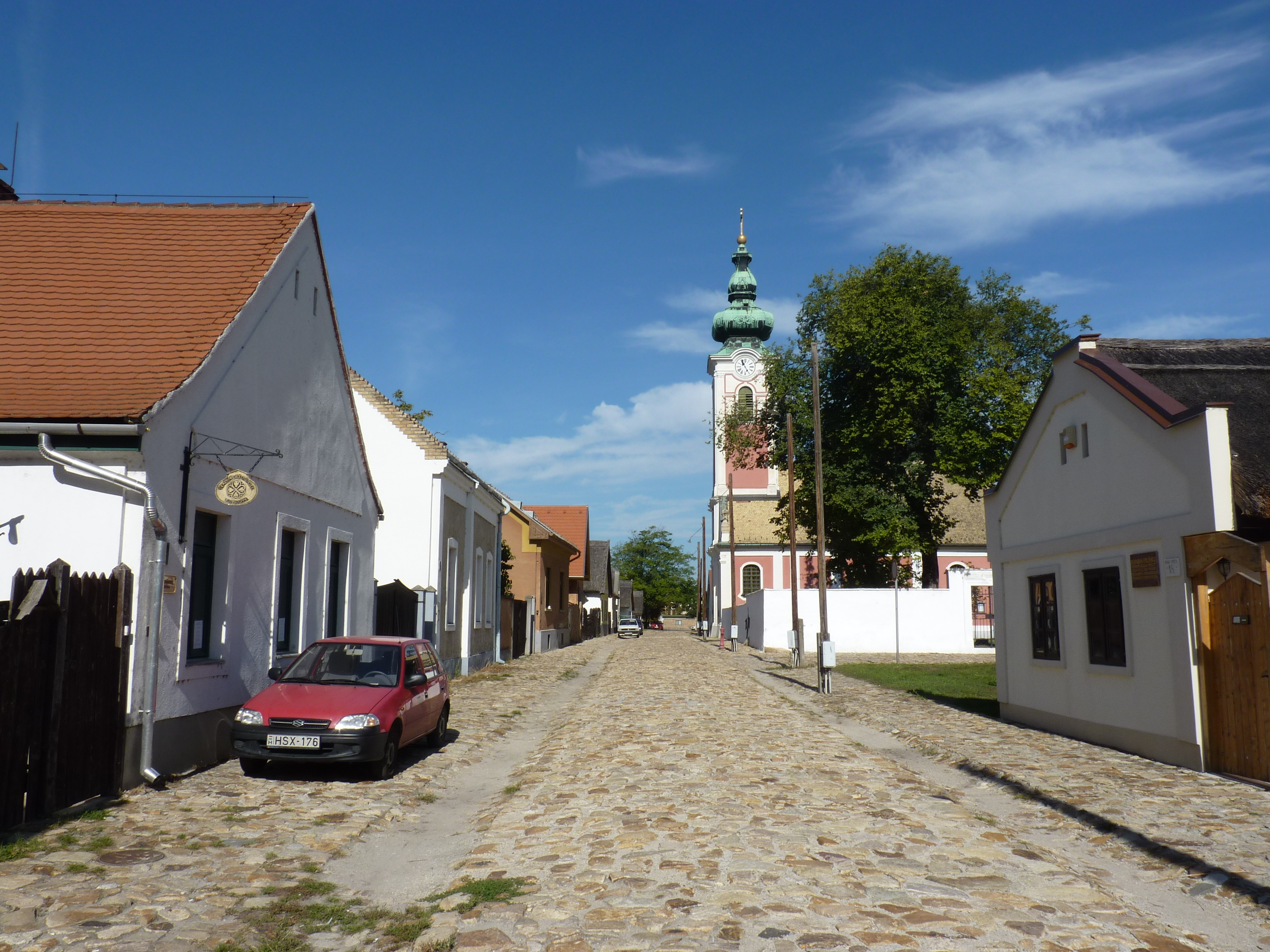
19th-century Serbian Quarter with the Church of St. John the Baptist, preserved in the middle of Székesfehérvár.

The Ottoman Turks invaded the city after a long siege in 1543 and only after a sally ended in most of the defenders including the commander, György Varkoch, being locked out by wealthy citizens fearing they might incur the wrath of the Ottomans by a lengthy siege. The Ottoman Empire continued to stretch northwards, taking parts of the Kingdom of Hungary in the 16th century, and reaching as far north as the Podolia in the mid-17th century; by the signing of the Peace of Buczacz with the Polish–Lithuanian Commonwealth in 1672, most of the Balkans was under Ottoman control.

Except for a short period in 1601, when Székesfehérvár was reconquered by an army led by Lawrence of Brindisi, the city remained under Ottoman administration for 145 years, until 1688, with the Ottomans being preoccupied with the Morean War. They renamed the city Beograd ("White city", from Serbian Beograd) and built mosques. In the 16th–17th centuries, it looked like a Muslim city. As a result, most of the original Hungarian population fled. It became a sanjak centre in the Budin Province, known as İstolni Beograd during Ottoman rule.

Ottoman expansion in Europe ended with their defeat in the Great Turkish War in 1699. The Treaty of Karlowitz forced them to surrender the region of Hungary under Ottoman control and portions of present-day Croatia, Romania, Slovakia, and Serbia to the Habsburg Empire, which pushed the Great Migrations of the Serbs to the southern regions of the Kingdom of Hungary (though as far in the north as the town of Szentendre, in which they formed the majority of the population in the 18th century, but to smaller extent also in the town of Komárom) and Habsburg-ruled Croatia.

== Habsburg Empire ==
The city began to prosper again only in the 18th century. It had a mixed population: Hungarians, Germans, Serbs, and Moravians.

By 1702, the cathedral of Nagyboldogasszony was blown up, thus destroying the largest cathedral in Hungary at that time, and the coronation temple. By the Doctrine of the Holy Crown, all kings of Hungary were obliged to be crowned in this cathedral, and to take part in coronation ceremony in the surroundings of the cathedral. The coronations after that time were held in Pozsony (now Bratislava).

In 1703, Székesfehérvár regained the status of a free royal town. In the middle of the century, several new buildings were erected (Franciscan church and monastery, Jesuit churches, public buildings, Baroque palaces). Maria Theresa made the city an episcopal seat in 1777.

By the early 19th century, the German population was assimilated. On 15 March 1848, the citizens joined the revolution. After the revolution and war for independence, Székesfehérvár lost its importance and became a mainly agricultural city. In 1909 The Times Engineering Contract List noted a bridge construction contract valued at £12,000 to be overseen by the Chief Magistrate.

=== Interwar period ===
New prosperity arrived between the two world wars, when several new factories were opened. In 1922 a radio station was established. It used two masts insulated against ground, each with a height of 152 metres. The last mast of the station was demolished in 2009.

=== World War II ===
In 1944, after the occupation of Hungary by Nazi Germany, the city's Jewish population was confined to a ghetto and was eventually deported to the Auschwitz concentration camp, together with further 3,000 Jews from the area. The pre-war Jewish population consisted of Neolog (Reform) and Orthodox communities with their respective synagogues, and some of its members were active Zionists.

In December 1944, Fehérvár came under Russian artillery fire, and stiff fighting broke out as the Red Army advanced on the city. The Germans had chosen to concentrate their forces to protect the 15-mile gap between Fehérvár and Lake Balaton. Whereas most of the gap consisted of marsh and difficult ground, Fehérvár was the node for eight highways and six railways. Despite the heavy German defences, a Soviet flying column broke through and occupied the city on 23 December; the Germans were able to push them out on 22 January 1945. In March 1945, the area was the battleground for the last major German offensive of World War II; but following its failure Marshal Tolbukhin broke through the German lines once more and recaptured the city on 22 March. A Soviet airfield was established at nearby Szabadbattyán.

== Post-war period ==
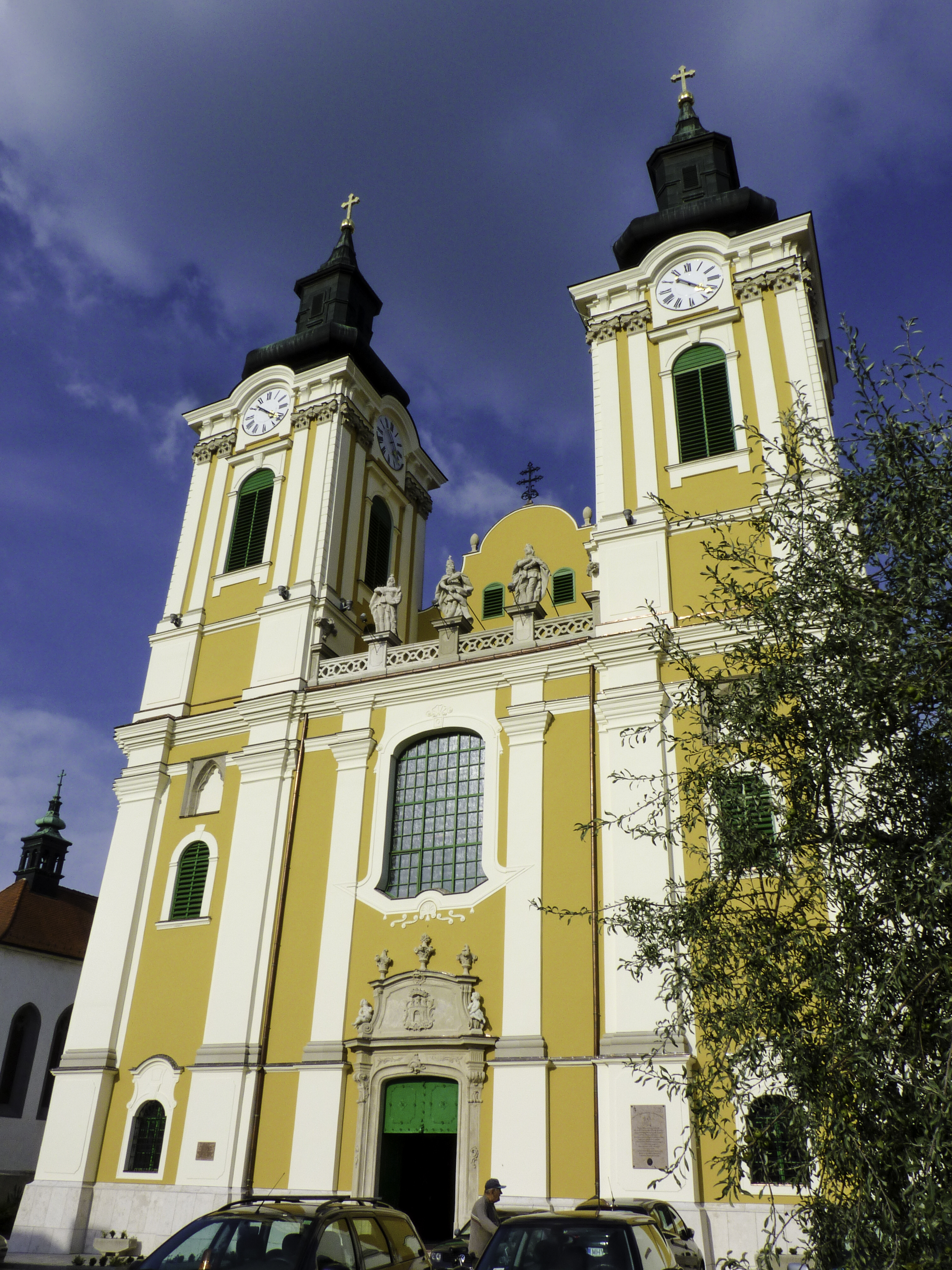
St. Stephen Cathedral.

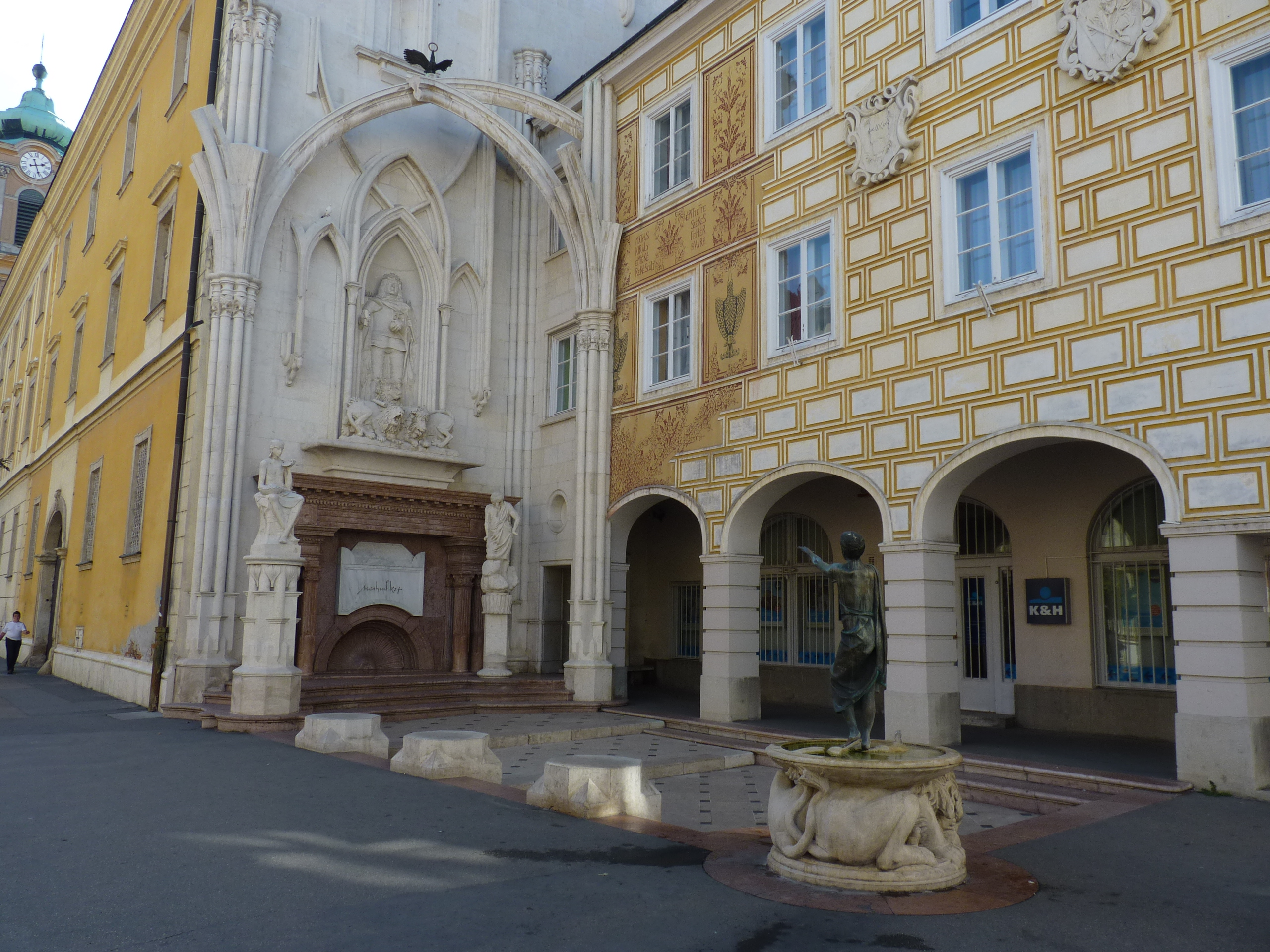
Matthias Corvinus Memorial.

In August 1951, over 150 people were killed when two trains collided in Fehérvár.

In the aftermath of World War II, the city was subject to industrialization, like many other cities and towns in the country. The most important factories were the Ikarus Bus factory, the Videoton radio and TV factory, and the Könnyűfémmű (colloquially Köfém) aluminium processing plant, since acquired by Alcoa. By the 1970s, Székesfehérvár had swelled to more than 100,000 inhabitants (in 1945 it had only about 35,000). Several housing estates were built, but the city centre preserved its Baroque atmosphere. The most important Baroque buildings are the cathedral, the episcopal palace and the city hall.

After the end of the Communist regime in Hungary (1989), the planned economy was abandoned in favor of the implementation of a free market system; all the important factories were on the verge of collapse (some eventually folded) and thousands of people lost their jobs. However, the city profited from losing the old and inefficient companies, as an abundance of skilled labour coupled with excellent traffic connections, and existing infrastructure attracted numerous foreign firms seeking to invest in Hungary. Székesfehérvár became one of the prime destinations for multinational companies setting up shop in Hungary (Ford and IBM are some of them), turning the city into a success story of Hungary's transition to a market economy. A few years later Denso, Alcoa, Philips, and Sanmina-SCI Corporation also settled in the city.
