= List of football stadiums in Hungary =

The following is a list of football stadiums in Hungary, ranked in order of capacity, with the minimum capacity being 1,000. Stadiums in bold are part of the 2026–27 Nemzeti Bajnokság I (NB I). Entries in italics are currently under construction or reconstruction.

== Current stadiums ==
#	Image	Stadium	Capacity	City	County	Home team	Opened	UEFA rank
1		Puskás Aréna	67,215	Budapest	Budapest, XIV.ker	Hungary national football team	2019	4/4 stars
2		Groupama Arena	23,700	Budapest	Budapest, IX.ker	**Ferencvárosi TC**	2014	4/4 stars
3		Nagyerdei Stadion	20,340	Debrecen	Hajdú-Bihar	**Debreceni VSC**	2014	4/4 stars
4		ETO Park	15,600	Győr	Győr-Moson-Sopron	**ETO FC**	2008	
5		Diósgyőri Stadion	15,325	Miskolc	Borsod-Abaúj-Zemplén	Diósgyőri VTK	2018	4/4 stars
6		National Athletics Centre	15,000	Budapest	Budapest	Hungarian Athletics Association	2023	
7		Sóstói Stadion	14,201	Székesfehérvár	Fejér	Fehérvár FC	2018	4/4 stars
8		Béke téri Stadion	14,000	Budapest	Budapest	Ferencvárosi TC II; Csepel FC	1939	
9		Szusza Ferenc Stadion	13,501	Budapest	Budapest	**Újpest FC**	2001	4/4 stars
10		Stadler Stadion	12,000	Akasztó	Bács-Kiskun	Stadler FC	1995	
11		Dunaújvárosi Stadion	12,000	Dunaújváros	Fejér	Dunaújváros PASE	2003	
12		Városi stadion	12,000	Ózd	Borsod-Abaúj-Zemplén	Ózd FC	1958	
13		ZTE Aréna	11,200	Zalaegerszeg	Zala	**Zalaegerszegi TE**	2002	
14		Oláh Gábor utcai stadion	10,200	Debrecen	Hajdú-Bihar		1950	
15		Bányász Stadion	10,000	Komló	Baranya	Komlói Bányász SK	1958	
16		Városi Stadion	10,000	Hódmezővásárhely	Csongrád	Hódmezővásárhelyi FC	1958	
17		Buzánszky Jenő Stadion	10,000	Dorog	Komárom-Esztergom	Dorogi FC	1921	
18		Szőnyi úti Stadion	9,000	Budapest	Budapest	Budapesti VSC		
19		Ligeti Stadion	9,000	Vác	Pest	Vác FC	1967	
20		Haladás Sportkomplexum	8,940	Szombathely	Vas	Szombathelyi Haladás	2017	4/4 stars
21		Bozsik Aréna	8,200	Budapest	Budapest	**Kispest Honvéd FC**	2020	4/4 stars
22		Városi Stadion	8,150	Nyíregyháza	Szabolcs-Szatmár-Bereg	**Nyíregyháza Spartacus FC**	2024	4/4 stars
23		Szent Gellért Fórum	8,136	Szeged	Csongrád	Szeged-Csanád	2019	4/4 stars
24		MVSC Stadion	8,000	Miskolc	Borsod-Abaúj-Zemplén	Miskolci VSC	1931	
25		Stadion Budai II. Laszló	7,500	Budapest	Budapest	Rákospalotai EAC	1959	
26		Városi Stadion	7,500	Szekszárd	Tolna	Szekszárdi UFC	1962	
27		PMFC Stadion	7,000	Pécs	Baranya	Pécsi MFC	1955	
28		Rákóczi Stadion	7,000	Kaposvár	Somogy	Kaposvári Rákóczi	2004	
29		Szojka Ferenc Stadion	7,000	Salgótarján	Nógrád	Salgótarján FC	1924	
30		Olajbányász Sporttelep	7,000	Nagykanizsa	Zala	Nagykanizsa LE	1964	
31		Révész utcai stadion	6,500	Siófok	Somogy	BFC Siófok	1961	
32		Széktói Stadion	6,320	Kecskemét	Bács-Kiskun	Kecskeméti TE	1962	
33		Fehérvári úti Stadion	6,150	Paks	Tolna	**Paksi FC**	1966	
34		Városi Stadion	6,000	Eger	Heves	Egri FC	1954	
35		Nádorvárosi Stadion	6,000	Győr	Győr-Moson-Sopron	DAC 1912 FC	1980	
36		Városi sporttelep	6,000	Hajdúnánás FK	Hajdú-Bihar	Hajdúnánás		
37		Perutz Stadion	5,500	Pápa	Veszprém	Lombard-Pápa TFC	1995	
38		Illovszky Rudolf Stadion	5,054	Budapest	Budapest	**Vasas SC**	2019	
39		Grosics Gyula Stadion	5,021	Tatabánya	Komárom-Esztergom	FC Tatabánya	1946	
40		Hidegkuti Nándor stadion	5,014	Budapest	Budapest	**MTK Budapest FC**	2016	
41		MÁV NTE Stadion	5,000	Nagykanizsa	Zala		1934	
42		Városi Sportcentrum	5,000	Ajka	Veszprém	FC Ajka	1948	
43		ESMTK Stadion	5,000	Budapest	Budapest	Erzsébeti Spartacus MTK LE	1912	
44		Szamosi Mihály Sporttelep	5,000	Budapest	Budapest	Soroksár SC		
45		Tatárárok Stadion	5,000	Salgótarján	Nógrád	Salgótarjáni BTC	1966	
46		Városi Sporttelep	5,000	Keszthely	Zala	FC Keszthely; Keszthelyi Haladás SC	1964	
47		Szegedi VSE Stadion	5,000	Szeged	Csongrád	Szegedi VSE	1937	
48		Városi Sporttelep	5,000	Kiskőrös	Bács-Kiskun	Kiskőrösi LC	1968	
49		Erzsébet-ligeti Sporttelep	5,000	Szarvas	Békés	Szarvasi FC	1921	
50		Kórház utcai Stadion	4,963	Békéscsaba	Békés	Békéscsaba 1912 Előre SE	1974	
51		Káposztás utcai Stadion	4,500	Sopron	Győr-Moson-Sopron	FC Sopron	2003	
52		Ménfői úti Stadion	4,500	Győr	Győr-Moson-Sopron	Gyirmót SE	2005	
53		Városi Sporttelep	4,450	Baja	Bács-Kiskun	Bajai LSE	1912	
54		Városi Stadion	4,183	Mezőkövesd	Borsod-Abaúj-Zemplén	Mezőkövesd Zsóry SE	2009	
55		Zsengellér Gyula Sportcentrum	4,000	Cegléd	Pest	Ceglédi VSE	1926	
56		Városi Sporttelep	4,000	Veszprém	Veszprém	Veszprém FC	1923	
57		Wittmann Antal park	4,000	Mosonmagyaróvár	Győr-Moson-Sopron	Mosonmagyaróvári TE		
58		BMTE Stadion	4,000	Budapest	Budapest	Budafoki LC	1912	
59		Tiszaújvárosi Sport Park	4,000	Tiszaújváros	Hajdú-Bihar	FC Tiszaújváros	1998	
60		Pancho Aréna	3,816	Felcsút	Fejér	**Puskás Akadémia FC**	2014	
61		Városi Stadion	3,500	Makó	Csongrád	Makó FC		
62		DEAC stadion	3,200	Debrecen	Hajdú-Bihar	Debreceni EAC; DVSC-DEAC	1926	
63		Tiszaligeti Stadion	3,026	Szolnok	Jász-Nagykun-Szolnok	Szolnoki MÁV FC	1974	
64		Várady Béla Sportközpont	3,000	Putnok	Borsod-Abaúj-Zemplén	Putnok VSE		
65		Mátrai Sándor Stadion	3,000	Orosháza	Békés	Orosháza FC	2005	
66		Várkerti Stadium	2,850	Kisvárda	Szabolcs-Szatmár-Bereg	**Kisvárda FC**	2018	
67		Városi Sportközpont	2,800	Hajdúböszörmény	Hajdú-Bihar	Hajdúböszörményi TE		
68		id. Christián László Városi Sporttelep	2,700	Gyula	Békés	Gyulai FC	1925	
69		Népkert-Sporttelep	2,500	Hatvan	Heves	FC Hatvan		
70		Városi Stadion	2,500	Jászapáti	Jász-Nagykun-Szolnok	Jászapáti VSE		
71		Sport utca	2,500	Budapest	Budapest	BKV Előre SC	1929	
71		Tersztyánszky Ödön Sportközpont	2,500	Csákvár	Fejér	Csákvári TK	1983	
73		Sport utca	2,500	Nyírbátor	Szabolcs-Szatmár-Bereg	Nyírbátori FC	1902	
74		Városi Sporttelep	2,500	Dabas	Pest	FC Dabas		
75		Városi Sportpálya	2,300	Balmazújváros	Hajdú-Bihar	Balmazújvárosi FC	1980	
76		Balassi utcai Stadion	2,250	Monor	Pest	Monori SE		
77		Cigándi Sportpálya	2,000	Cigánd	Borsod-Abaúj-Zemplén	Cigánd SE		
78		Kertész Károly Stadion	2,000	Maglód	Pest	Maglódi TC		
79		Elektromos-pálya	2,000	Budapest	Budapest	Vizafogó FC; Angyalföldi RSE		
80		Alkotmány tér	1,500	Kozármisleny	Baranya	Kozármisleny SE	1995	
81		Grosics Akadémia	1,500	Gyula	Békés	Szeged 2011	2010	
82		Angyalföldi Sportközpont	1,500	Budapest	Budapest	Hidegkúti SC; HunReál SC; Respect FC		
83		Sport utca	1,500	Tököl	Pest	Tököl VSK		
84		Sport utca	1,200	Szigetszentmiklós	Pest	Szigetszentmiklósi TK	2007	
85		Árok utca	1,200	Budaörs	Pest	Budaörsi SC	1999	
86		Pete András Stadion	1,080	Kazincbarcika	Borsod-Abaúj-Zemplén	Kazincbarcikai SC	1969	
87		RKSK-pálya	1,000	Budapest	Budapest	Rákosmenti KSK	1940	

== Former stadiums ==
Stadiums which have been demolished and no longer exist.

Image	Stadium	Capacity	City	County	Home team	Opened	Closed	Demolished
	Puskás Ferenc Stadion (1953); Népstadion	56,000	Budapest	Budapest	Hungary national football team	1953	2014	2016
	Stadion ETO	28,000	Győr	Győr-Moson-Sopron	Győri ETO FC	1967	2007	2008
	Üllői úti Stadion; Albert Flórián Stadion	18,100	Budapest	Budapest	Ferencvárosi TC	1974	2013	2013
	Felső Tisza-parti stadion	15,000	Szeged	Csongrád	Tisza Volán SC	1951		
	Sóstói Stadion (1967)	14,300	Székesfehérvár	Fejér	Videoton FC	1967	2016	2016
	Hidegkuti Nándor Stadion (1947)	12,700	Budapest	Budapest	MTK Budapest FC	1947	2014	2015
	Építők Stadion	12,500	Budapest	Budapest		1936		
	PVSK Stadion	12,000	Pécs	Baranya	Pécsi VSK	1952	2018	2018
	Városi Stadion (1958)	10,300	Nyíregyháza	Szabolcs-Szatmár-Bereg	Nyíregyháza Spartacus FC	1958	2021	2021
	Rohonci úti Stadion	9,500	Szombathely	Vas	Szombathelyi Haladás	1923	2015	2015
	Diósgyőri Stadion (1939)	9,345	Miskolc	Borsod-Abaúj-Zemplén	Diósgyőri VTK	1939	2016	2016
	Illovszky Rudolf Stadion (1960)	9,000	Budapest	Budapest	Vasas SC	1960	2016	2016

== See also ==
- List of European stadiums by capacity
- List of association football stadiums by capacity
- List of association football stadiums by country
- List of sports venues by capacity
- List of stadiums by capacity
- Lists of stadiums
