= Tibor Viniczai =

Hungarian politician (1956–2022)

Mayor of Székesfehérvár
- In office 1 July 2010 – 3 October 2010
- Preceded by: Tihamér Warvasovszky
- Succeeded by: András Cser-Palkovics

Personal details
- Born: 6 September 1956 Székesfehérvár, Hungary
- Died: 27 December 2022 (aged 66)
- Party: MDF
- Profession: Politician

Tibor Viniczai (6 September 1956 – 27 December 2022) was a Hungarian agricultural engineer and politician, who served as Mayor of Székesfehérvár in 2010.

Viniczai was a founding member of the Hungarian Democratic Forum (MDF) in 1988. He was appointed mayor of his hometown in July 2010, after his predecessor, Tihamér Warvasovszky resigned when he became Vice President of the State Audit Office of Hungary.

Viniczai died on 27 December 2022, at the age of 66.

Political offices
Preceded by Tihamér Warvasovszky	Mayor of Székesfehérvár; 2010	Succeeded by András Cser-Palkovics
