= Székesfehérvár =

City with county rights in Central Transdanubia, Hungary

- City with county rights
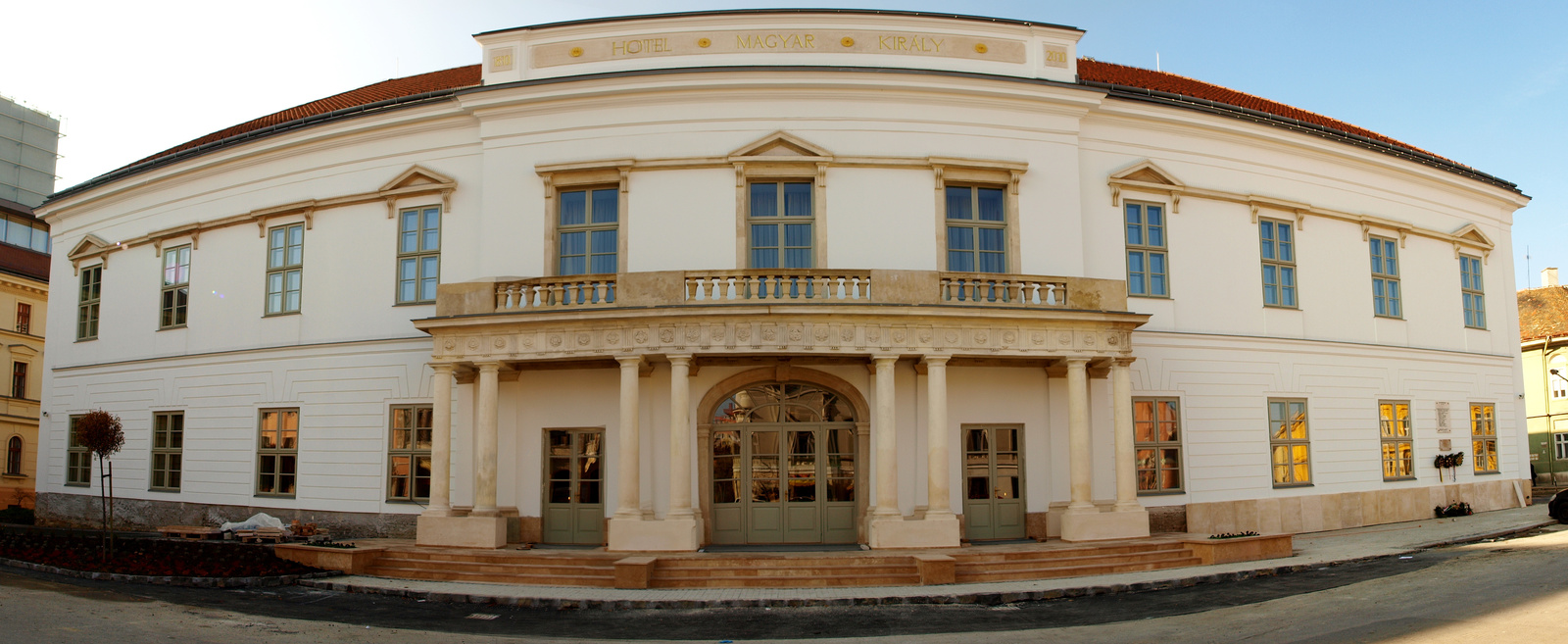
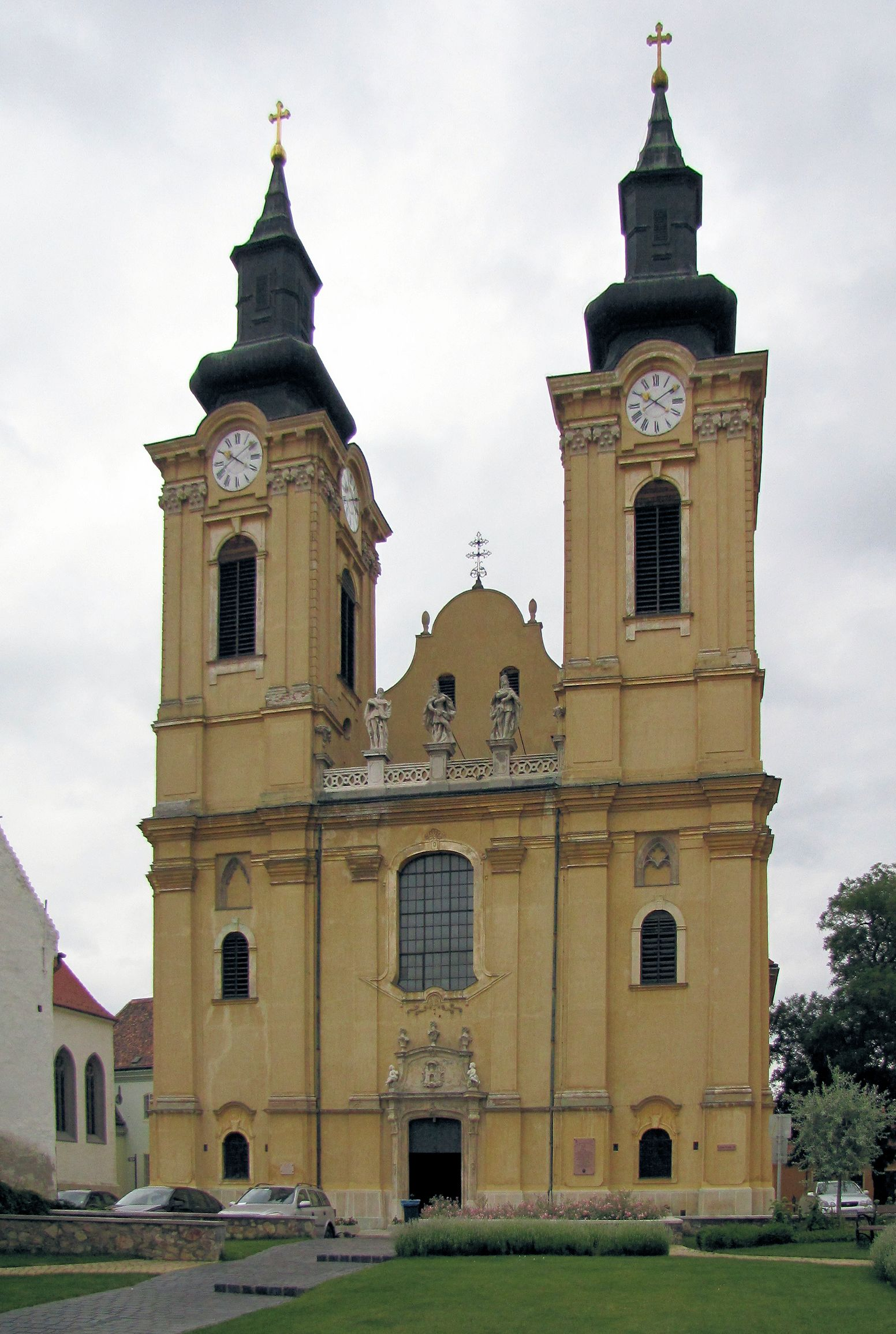
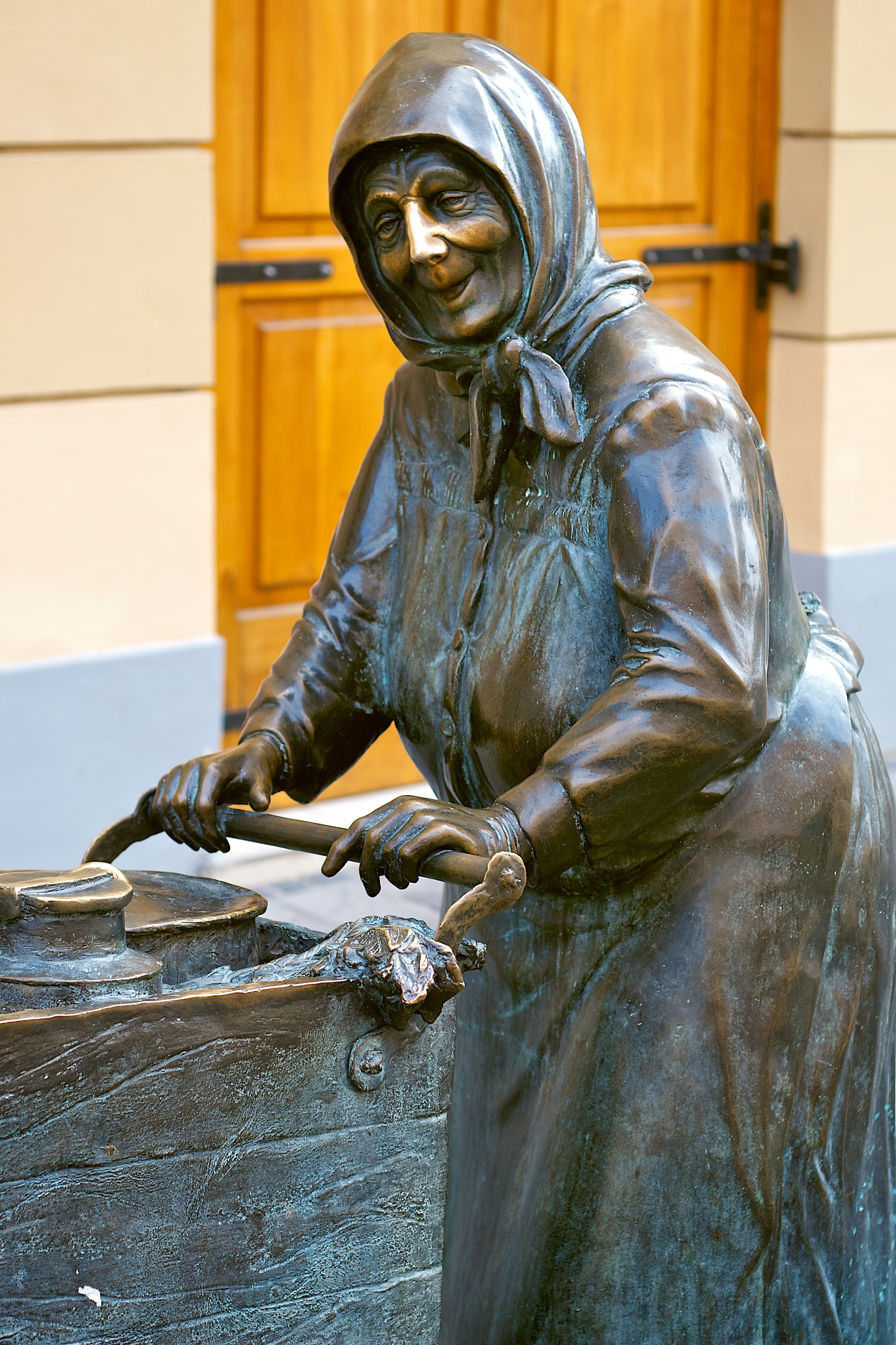
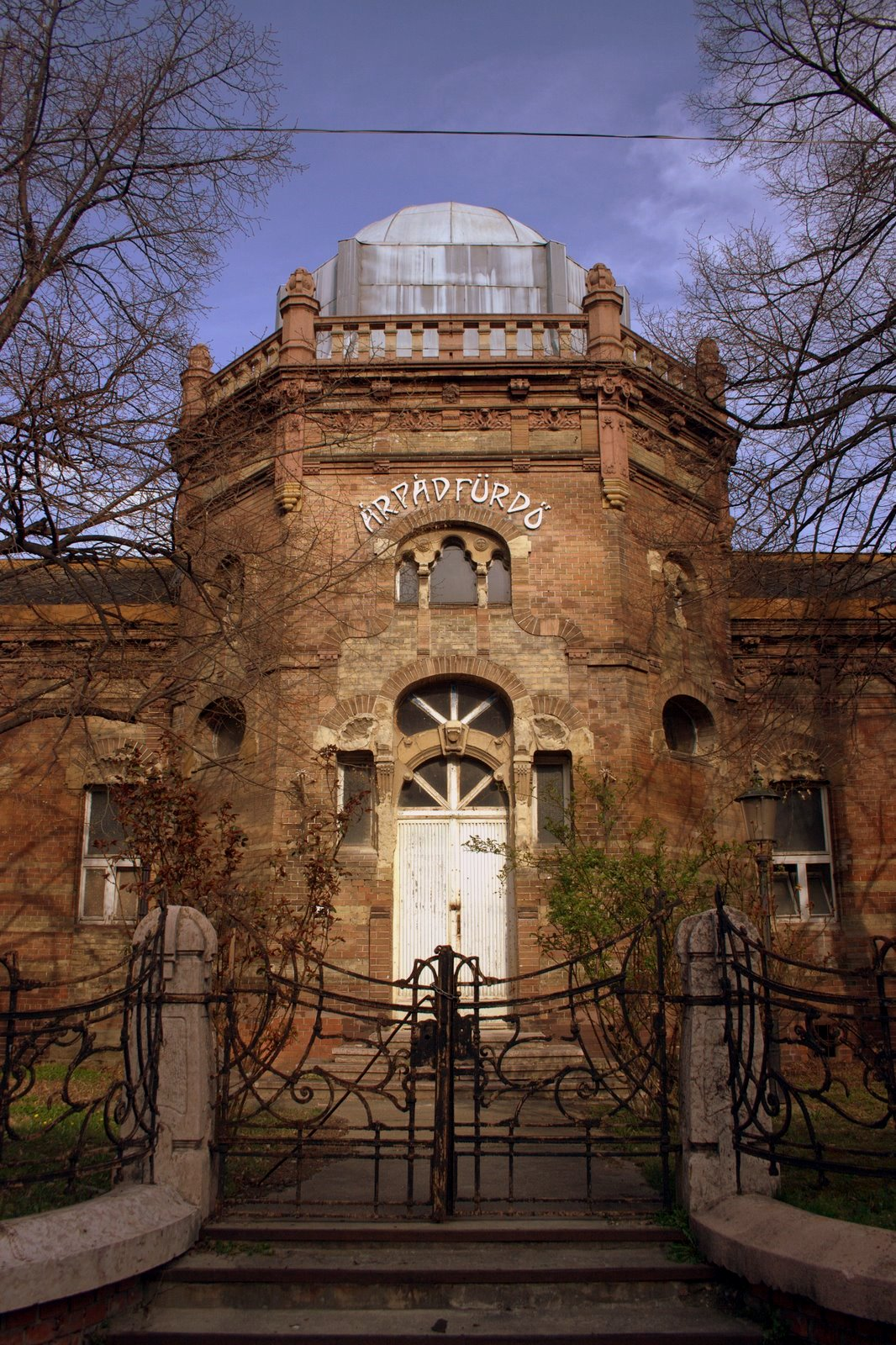
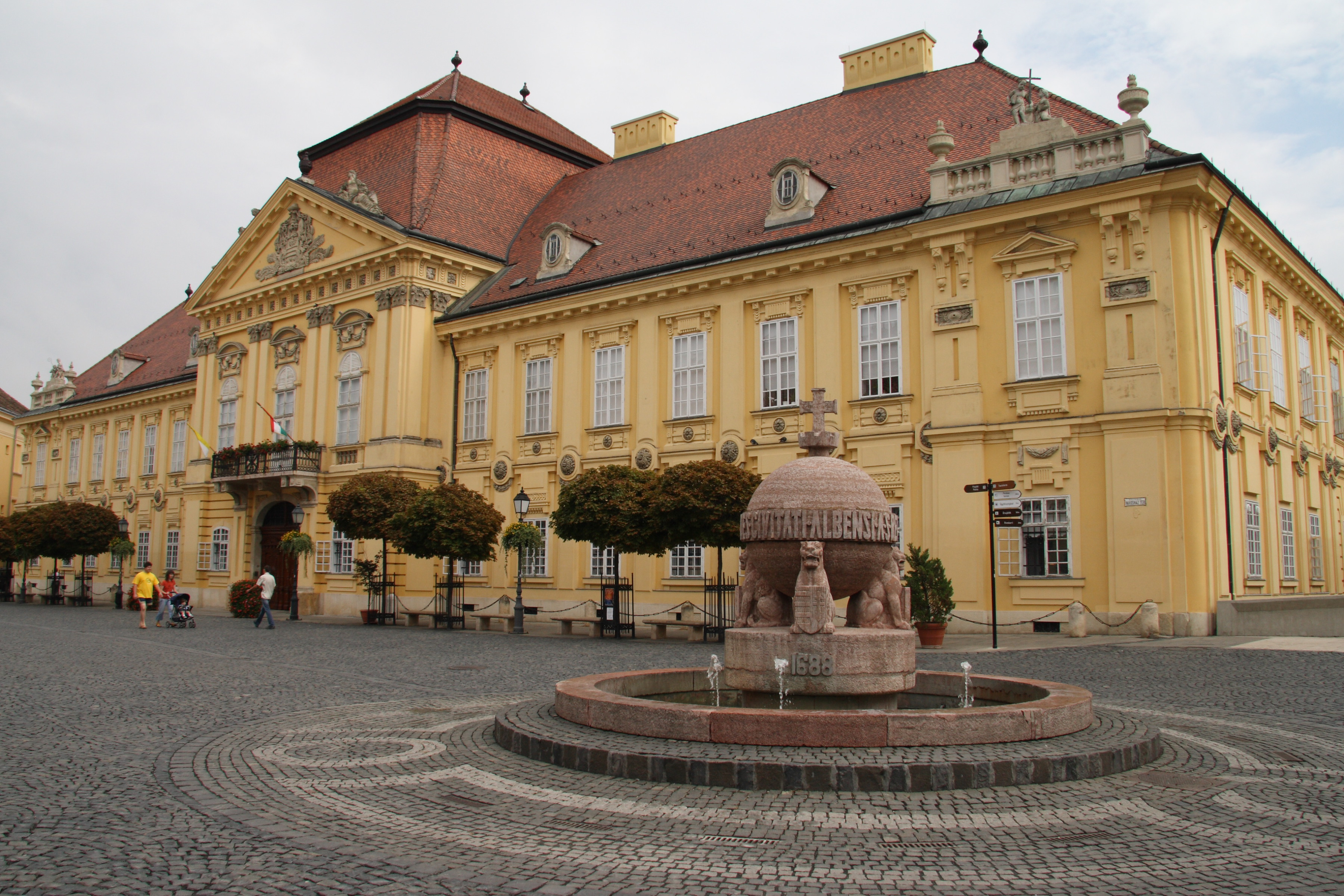
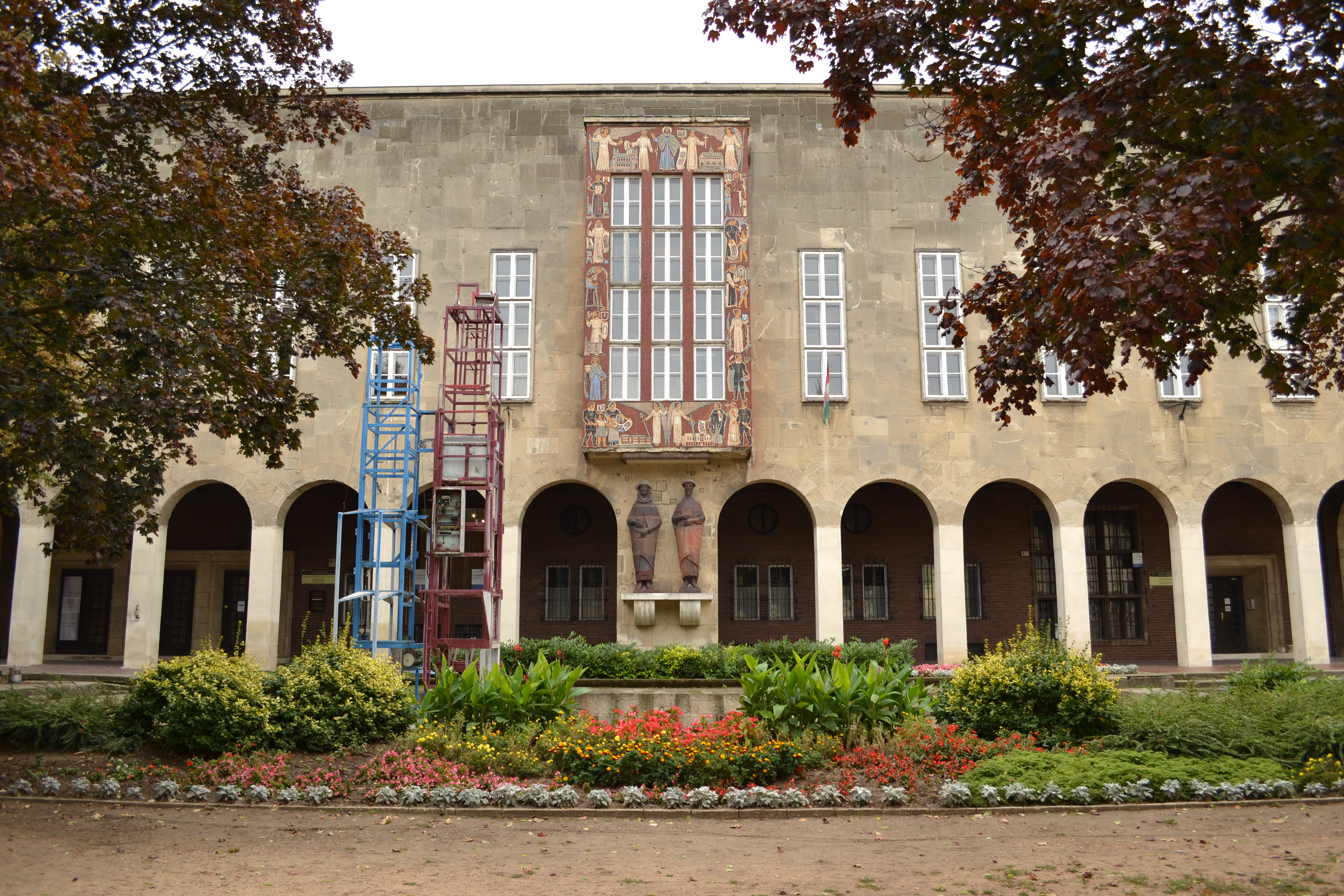
- From the top, left to right: Hungarian Royal Hotel, Cathedral of Székesfehérvár, Aunt Kati statue, Árpád Spa, Episcopal Palace, and Csók István Gallery and Vörösmarty Mihály Library

- Flag Coat of arms
- Nicknames: Fehérvár; Hungarian Crowning City; City of Kings; City of Churches
- Location within Fejér County Location within Hungary
- Coordinates: 47.18877°N 18.41384°E
- Country: Hungary
- Region: Central Transdanubia
- County: Fejér
- District: Székesfehérvár
- Established: 972
- City status: 972

Government
  - Mayor: András Cser-Palkovics (Fidesz-KDNP)
  - Deputy Mayor: Éva Brájer (Fidesz-KDNP); Tamás Égi (Fidesz-KDNP); Péter Róth (Fidesz-KDNP); Attila Mészáros (Fidesz-KDNP)
  - Town Notary: Dr Viktor Bóka

Area
  - City with county rights: 170.89 km^{2} (65.98 sq mi)
- Elevation: 118 m (387 ft)

Population (2014)
  - City with county rights: 97,617
  - Rank: 9th
  - Density: 571.23/km^{2} (1,479.5/sq mi)
  - Urban: 272,474 (9th)
- Demonym(s): székesfehérvári, fehérvári

Population by ethnicity
  - Hungarians: 85.0%
  - Germans: 1.3%
  - Roma: 0.8%
  - Romanians: 0.1%
  - Serbs: 0.1%
  - Slovaks: 0.1%
  - Croats: 0.1%
  - Poles: 0.1%
  - Ukrainians: 0.1%

Population by religion
  - Roman Catholic: 35.0%
  - Greek Catholic: 0.3%
  - Calvinists: 8.2%
  - Lutherans: 1.4%
  - Other: 1.6%
  - Non-religious: 21.9%
  - Unknown: 31.7%
- Time zone: UTC+1 (CET)
  - Summer (DST): UTC+2 (CEST)
- Postal code: 8000 to 8019
- Area code: (+36) 22
- Motorways: M7
- NUTS 3 code: HU211
- Distance from Budapest: 64.2 km (39.9 mi) Southwest
- International airports: Székesfehérvár
- MP: Tamás Vargha (Fidesz-KDNP); Gábor Törő (Fidesz-KDNP)
- Website: szekesfehervar.hu

Székesfehérvár (Hungarian: [ˈseːkɛʃfɛheːrvaːr]; German: Stuhlweißenburg [ʃtuːlˈvaɪsn̩bʊʁk]; Latin: Alba Regia; Croatian: Stolni Biograd; Serbian: Стони Београд, romanized: Stoni Beograd; Slovak: Stoličný Belehrad), known colloquially as Fehérvár (lit. 'white castle'), is a city in central Hungary, and the country's ninth-largest city. It is the regional capital of Central Transdanubia, and the centre of Fejér County and Székesfehérvár District. The area is an important rail and road junction between Lake Balaton and Lake Velence.

Székesfehérvár, a royal residence (székhely), as capital of the Kingdom of Hungary, held a central role in the Middle Ages. As required by the Doctrine of the Holy Crown, the first kings of Hungary were crowned and buried here. Significant trade routes led to the Balkans and Italy, and to Buda and Vienna. Historically the city has come under Ottoman and Habsburg control, and was known in many languages by translations of "white castle" – Croatian: Biograd, Slovak: Belehrad, etc.

== History ==
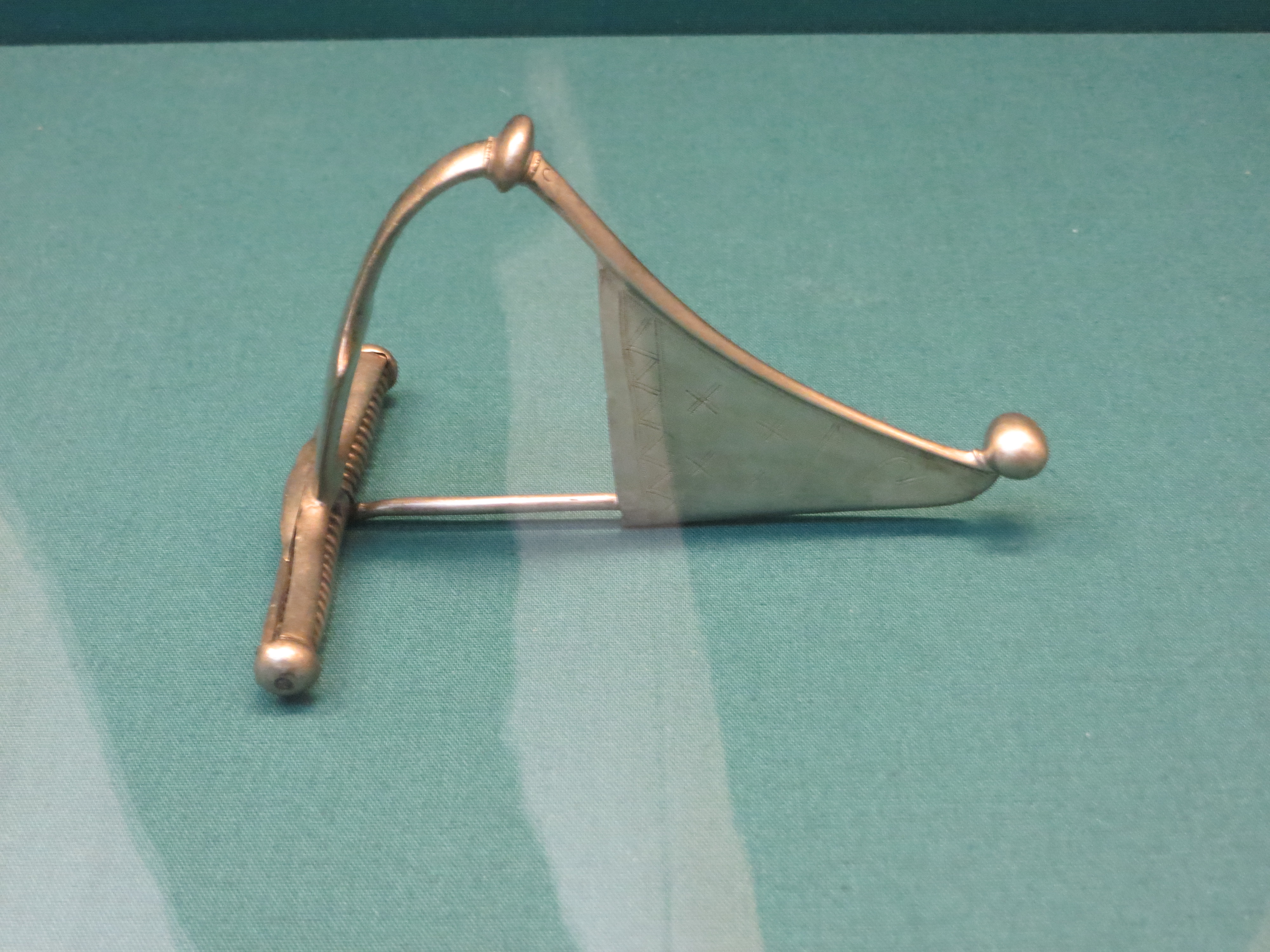
La Tène Silver hinged brooch found in Székesfehérvár, dating from 1-100 AD (British Museum)

=== Pre-Hungarian ===
The place has been inhabited since the 5th century BCE. In Roman times, the settlements were called Gorsium and Herculia. After the Migration Period Fejér County was the part of the Avar Khaganate, while the Slavic and Great Moravian presence is disputed. (There is no source for the name of the place before the late 10th century.) In the Middle Ages its Latin name was Alba Regalis/Alba Regia. The town was an important traffic junction between Lake Balaton and Lake Velence, several trade routes led from here to the Balkans and Italy, and to Buda and Vienna. Today, the town is a junction of seven railroad lines.

=== Early Hungarian ===
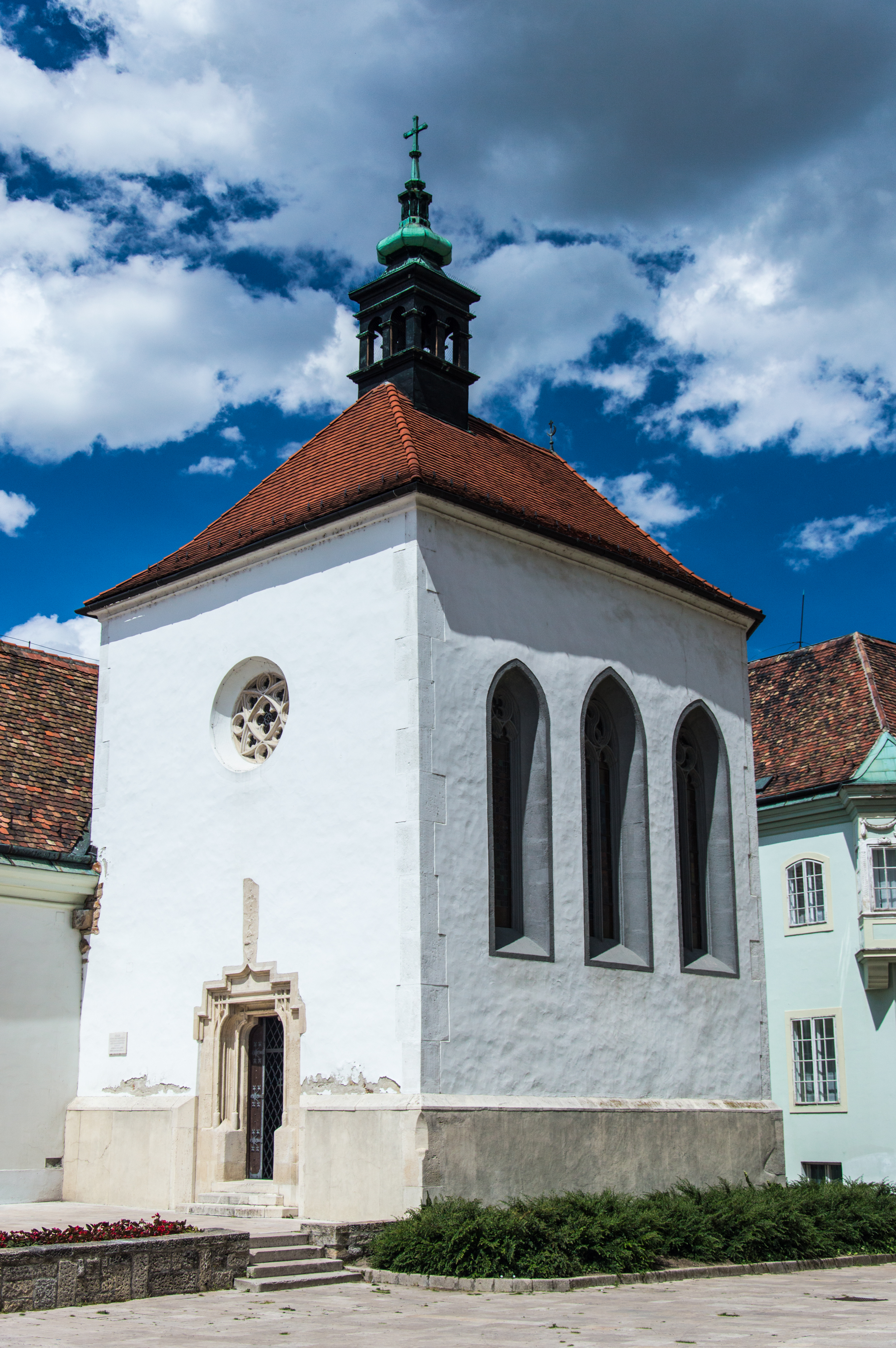
Later Gothic St. Anna Chapel, built around 1485

Grand Prince Géza of the Árpád dynasty was the nominal overlord of all seven Magyar tribes but in reality ruled only part of the united territory. He aimed to integrate Hungary into Christian Western Europe by rebuilding the state according to the Western political and social models. Géza founded the Hungarian town in 972 on four moorland islands between the Gaja stream and its tributary, the Sárvíz, one of the most important Hungarian tributaries of the Danube. He also had a small stone castle built. Székesfehérvár was first mentioned in a document by the Bishopric of Veszprém, 1009, as Alba Civitas.

István I, Grand Prince of the Hungarians, granted town rights to the settlement, surrounded the town with a plank wall, and founded a school and a monastery. Under his rule the construction of the Romanesque Székesfehérvár Basilica began (it was built between 1003 and 1038). The settlement had about 3,500 inhabitants at this time and was the royal seat for hundreds of years. 43 kings were crowned in Székesfehérvár (the last one in 1526) and 15 kings were buried here (the last one in 1540), including King St. Stephen I, Hungary's first monarch. In the past few decades, archaeologists have excavated medieval ruins, including those of the Romanesque basilica and the mausoleum of King István I; they can now be visited.

The area is also determined to be the location where Gottschalk, a monk leading a contingent of the People Crusade, got annihilated with his troops.

In the 12th century, the town prospered; churches, monasteries, and houses were built. It was an important station on the pilgrim route to the Holy Land. András II issued the Golden Bull here in 1222. The Bull included the rights of nobles and the duties of the king, and the Constitution of Hungary was based on it until 1848. It is often compared to England's Magna Carta.

During the Mongol invasion of Hungary (1241–1242), the invaders could not get close to the castle: Kadan ruled Mongol warriors could not get through the surrounding marshes because of flooding caused by melting snow. In the 13th–15th centuries, the town prospered, and several palaces were built. In the 14th century, Székesfehérvár was surrounded by city walls.

After the death of King Mátyás (1490), the German army of 20,000 men led by the Holy Roman Emperor Maximilian I invaded Hungary. They advanced into the heart of Hungary and captured the city of Székesfehérvár, which they sacked, as well as the tomb of King Mátyás, which was kept there. His Landsknechts were still unsatisfied with the plunder and refused to go for taking Buda. He returned to the Empire in late December and the Hungarian troops liberated Székesfehérvár in the next year.

=== Ottoman period ===
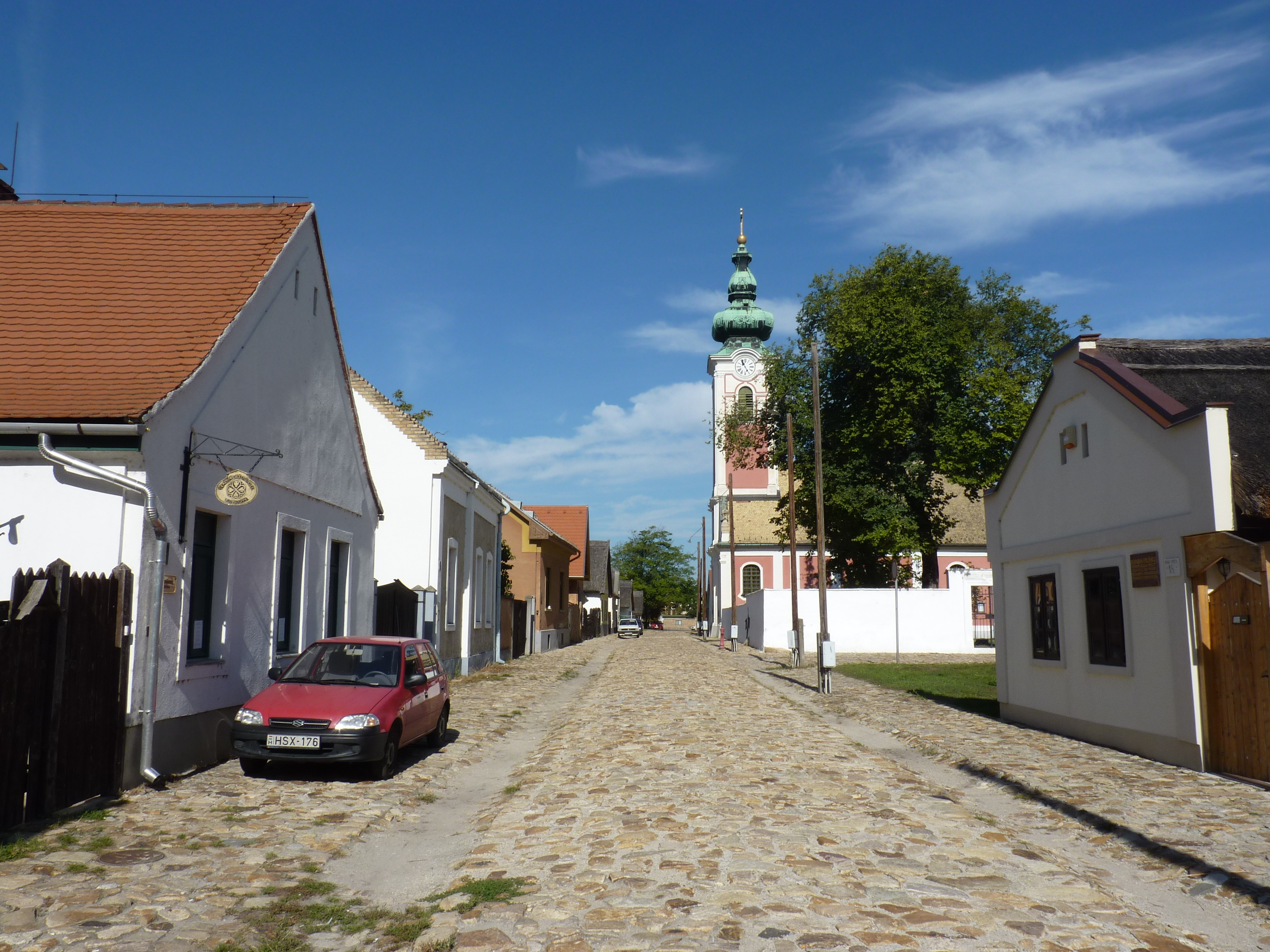
19th-century Serbian Quarter with the Church of St. John the Baptist, preserved in the middle of Székesfehérvár

The Ottoman Turks invaded the city after a long siege in 1543 and only after a sally ended in most of the defenders including the commander, György Varkoch, being locked out by wealthy citizens fearing they might incur the wrath of the Ottomans by a lengthy siege. The Ottoman Empire continued to stretch northwards, taking parts of the Kingdom of Hungary in the 16th century, and reaching as far north as the Podolia in the mid-17th century; by the signing of the Peace of Buczacz with the Polish–Lithuanian Commonwealth in 1672, most of the Balkans was under Ottoman control.

Except for a short period in 1601, when Székesfehérvár was reconquered by an army led by Lawrence of Brindisi, the city remained under Ottoman administration for 145 years, until 1688, with the Ottomans being preoccupied with the Morean War. They renamed the city Beograd ("White city", from Serbian Beograd) and built mosques. In the 16th–17th centuries, it looked like a Muslim city. As a result, most of the original Hungarian population fled. It became a sanjak centre in the Budin Province, known as İstolni Beograd during Ottoman rule.

Ottoman expansion in Europe ended with their defeat in the Great Turkish War in 1699. The Treaty of Karlowitz forced them to surrender the region of Hungary under Ottoman control and portions of present-day Croatia, Romania, Slovakia, and Serbia to the Habsburg Empire, which pushed the Great Migrations of the Serbs to the southern regions of the Kingdom of Hungary (though as far in the north as the town of Szentendre, in which they formed the majority of the population in the 18th century, but to smaller extent also in the town of Komárom) and Habsburg-ruled Croatia.

=== Habsburg Empire ===
The city began to prosper again only in the 18th century. It had a mixed population: Hungarians, Germans, Serbs, and Moravians.

By 1702, the Cathedral of the Assumption of the Blessed Virgin Mary was blown up, thus destroying the largest cathedral in Hungary at that time, and the coronation temple. By the Doctrine of the Holy Crown, all kings of Hungary were obliged to be crowned in this cathedral, and to take part in coronation ceremony in the surroundings of the cathedral. The coronations after that time were held in Pozsony (now Bratislava).

In 1703, Székesfehérvár regained the status of a free royal town. In the middle of the century, several new buildings were erected (Franciscan church and monastery, Jesuit churches, public buildings, Baroque palaces). Maria Theresa made the city an episcopal seat in 1777.

By the early 19th century, the German population was assimilated. On 15 March 1848, the citizens joined the revolution. After the revolution and war for independence, Székesfehérvár lost its importance and became a mainly agricultural city. In 1909 The Times Engineering Contract List noted a bridge construction contract valued at £12,000 to be overseen by the Chief Magistrate.

=== Interwar period ===
New prosperity arrived between the two world wars, when several new factories were opened. In 1922 a radio station was established. It used two masts insulated against ground, each with a height of 152 metres. The last mast of the station was demolished in 2009.

=== World War II ===
In 1944, after the occupation of Hungary by Nazi Germany, the city's Jewish population was confined to a ghetto and was eventually deported to the Auschwitz concentration camp, together with further 3,000 Jews from the area. The pre-war Jewish population consisted of Neolog (Reform) and Orthodox communities with their respective synagogues, and some of its members were active Zionists.

In December 1944, Fehérvár came under Russian artillery fire, and stiff fighting broke out as the Red Army advanced on the city. The Germans had chosen to concentrate their forces to protect the 15-mile gap between Fehérvár and Lake Balaton. Whereas most of the gap consisted of marsh and difficult ground, Fehérvár was the node for eight highways and six railways. Despite the heavy German defences, a Soviet flying column broke through and occupied the city on 23 December; the Germans were able to push them out on 22 January 1945. In March 1945, the area was the battleground for the last major German offensive of World War II; but following its failure Marshal Tolbukhin broke through the German lines once more and recaptured the city on 22 March. A Soviet airfield was established at nearby Szabadbattyán.

=== Post-war period ===
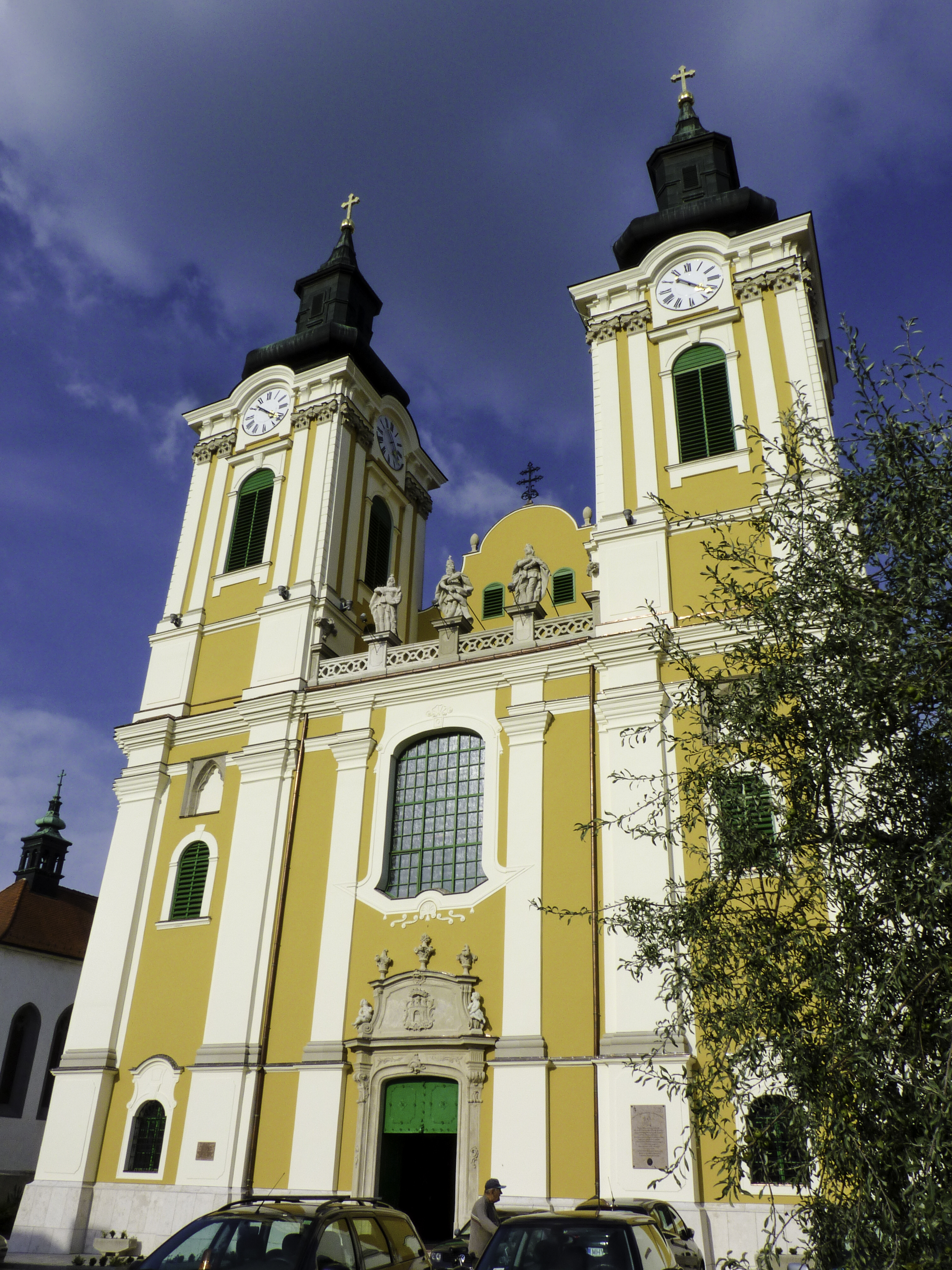
St. Stephen Cathedral

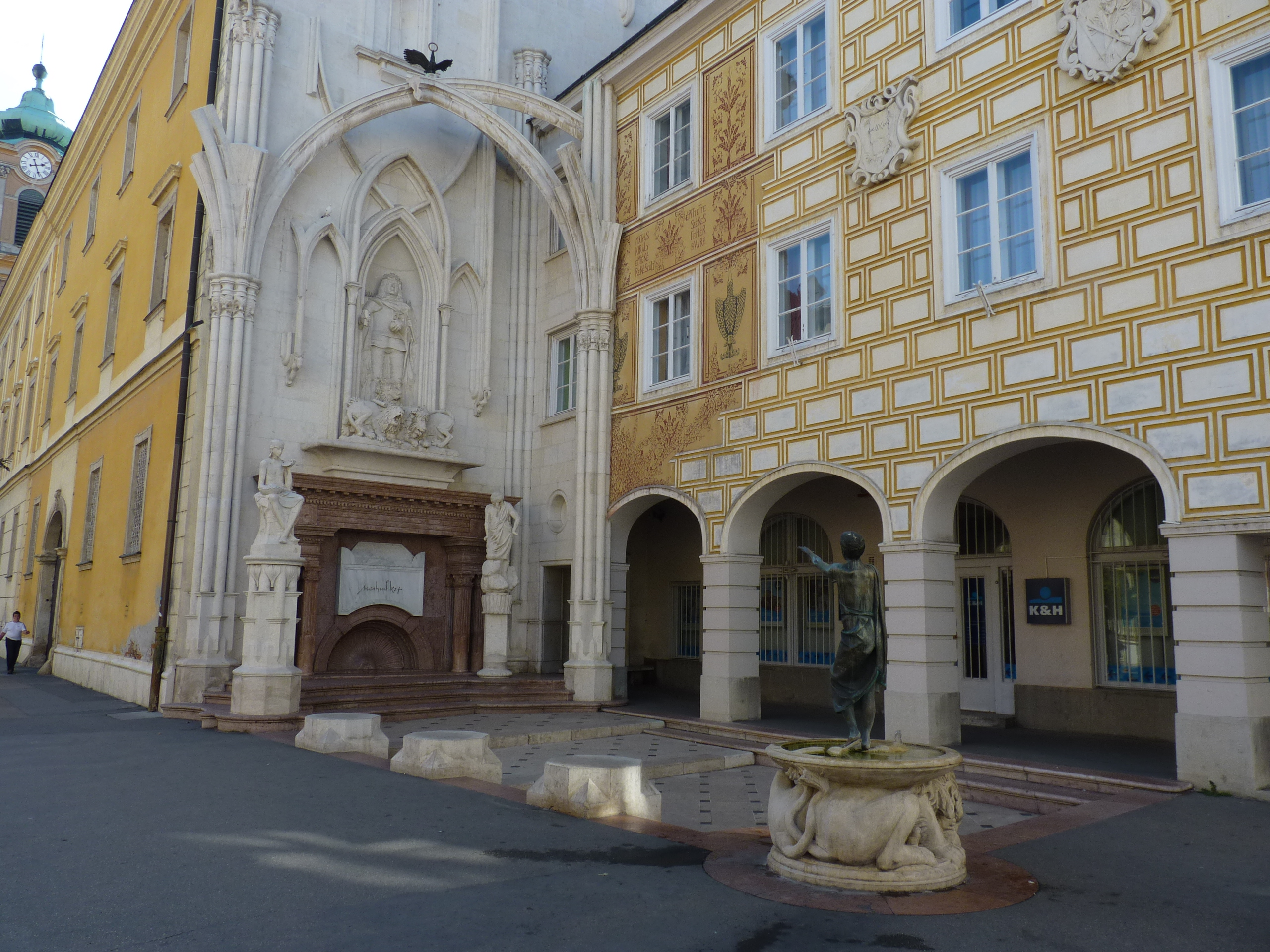
Matthias Corvinus Memorial

In August 1951, over 150 people were killed when two trains collided in Fehérvár.

In the aftermath of World War II, the city was subject to industrialization, like many other cities and towns in the country. The most important factories were the Ikarus Bus factory, the Videoton radio and TV factory, and the Könnyűfémmű (colloquially Köfém) aluminium processing plant, since acquired by Alcoa. By the 1970s, Székesfehérvár had swelled to more than 100,000 inhabitants (in 1945 it had only about 35,000). Several housing estates were built, but the city centre preserved its Baroque atmosphere. The most important Baroque buildings are the cathedral, the episcopal palace and the city hall.

After the end of the Communist regime in Hungary (1989), the planned economy was abandoned in favor of the implementation of a free market system; all the important factories were on the verge of collapse (some eventually folded) and thousands of people lost their jobs. However, the city profited from losing the old and inefficient companies, as an abundance of skilled labour coupled with excellent traffic connections, and existing infrastructure attracted numerous foreign firms seeking to invest in Hungary. Székesfehérvár became one of the prime destinations for multinational companies setting up shop in Hungary (Ford and IBM are some of them), turning the city into a success story of Hungary's transition to a market economy. A few years later Denso, Alcoa, Philips, and Sanmina-SCI Corporation also settled in the city.

== Culture ==
=== Architecture ===
- Historical centre (Baroque, Classical) buildings
- St Stephen Cathedral and ruins of Székesfehérvár Basilica (one of the largest basilicas in medieval Europe), where the Diets were held and the crown jewels kept, seat for the coronation of the Hungarian monarch and location of royal burials and memorials.
- St Anna Chapel (Gothic, built around 1470)
- "Ruin Garden": Ruins of medieval church founded by St Stephen
- Episcopal Palace (Zopf style)
- City Hall
- Zichy Palace (Zopf style manor house, 1781)
- Serbian Quarter (12 thatched peasant houses and a Byzantine-style church, won a Europa Nostra award in 1990)
- Bory Castle (20th century). A fantastic castle-like structure built by the sculptor Jenő Bory and his wife with their own hands.
- Vörösmarty Theater, the oldest theater of the country

=== Statues and memorials ===
- Golden Bull memorial. The Golden Bull was an important charter of King András II, it was released here; the memorial is from 1972.
- Globus crucifer (a stone image of the royal symbol of power of the same name)
- Statue of György Varkoch at the supposed site of his death at the gates (see above)
- Flower clock
- Railway model exhibition

=== Museums and galleries ===
- King István Museum
- Doll Museum
- Black Eagle (Fekete Sas) Pharmacy Museum
- City Museum
- City Gallery
- Csitáry spring (mineral water source)

== Population ==
Historical population
Year	Pop.	±%
1870	23,279	—
1880	26,559	+14.1%
1890	28,539	+7.5%
1900	33,196	+16.3%
1910	37,710	+13.6%
1920	40,352	+7.0%
1930	41,890	+3.8%
1941	49,103	+17.2%
1945	35,000	−28.7%
1949	42,260	+20.7%
1960	56,978	+34.8%
1970	79,064	+38.8%
1980	103,571	+31.0%
1990	108,958	+5.2%
2001	106,869	−1.9%
2011	100,570	−5.9%
2022	94,906	−5.6%

Ethnic groups (2001 census):

- Hungarians - 95.7%
- Germans - 0.8%
- Roma - 0.5%
- Others - 0.5%
- No answer - 2.4%

Religions (2001 census):

- Roman Catholic - 53.8%. The city stands in the Roman Catholic Diocese of Székesfehérvár
- Calvinist - 12.1%
- Lutheran - 1.9%
- Greek Catholic - 0.5%
- Other (Christian) - 1%
- Other (non-Christian) - 0.2%
- Atheists - 19.7%
- No answer, unknown - 10.7%

== Politics ==
The current mayor of Székesfehérvár is András Cser-Palkovics (Fidesz).

The local Municipal Assembly, elected at the 2019 local government elections, is made up of 21 members (1 Mayor, 14 Individual constituencies MEPs and 6 Compensation List MEPs) divided into this political parties and alliances:

Party	Seats	Current Municipal Assembly
Fidesz	14	M
Opposition coalition (Note: Coalition of DK-Jobbik-LMP-Mindenki Magyarországa-Momentum-MSZP-Dialogue.)	4	
Independent	2	
Válasz, Independent Civils	1	

=== List of mayors ===
List of City Mayors from 1990:

Member	Party	Term of office
István Balsay	Independent	1990–1994
István Nagy	Fidesz	1994–1998
Tihamér Warvasovszky	MSZP-SZDSZ	1998–2010
Tibor Viniczai	MDF	2010
András Cser-Palkovics	Fidesz	2010–

== Economy ==
=== Transport ===
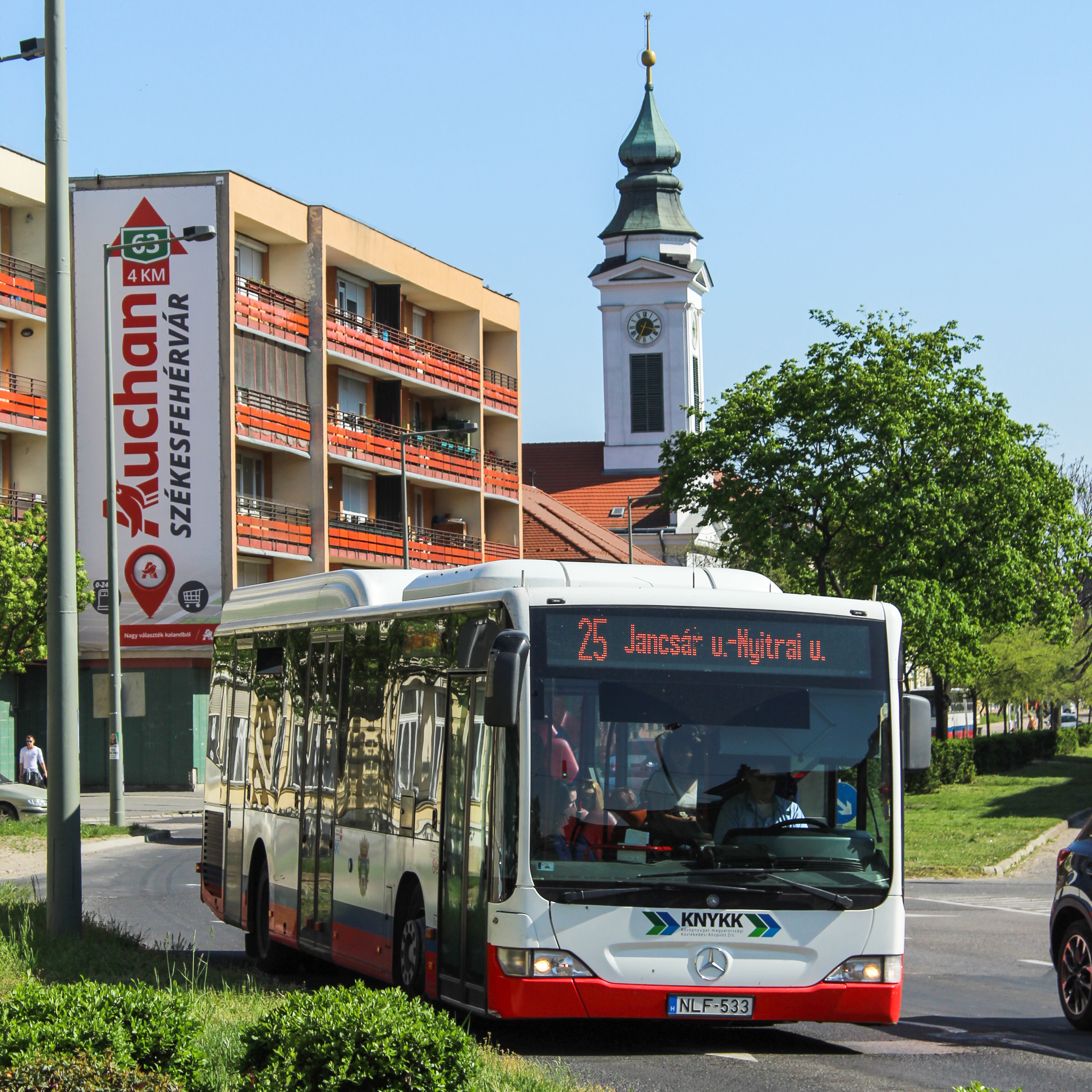
Mercedes-Benz Citaro on Line 25 operated by KNYKK

Székesfehérvár is an important hub for the Hungarian railway system (MÁV). Trains depart to the northern and southern coasts of Lake Balaton and towards the capital. The city is also reachable by regional buses from other major national destinations. There are numerous local buslines operating 7 days a week, operated by the company that also operates the regional buses in the region, KNYKK Zrt. (Közép-Nyugat Magyarországi Közlekedési Központ).

== Sport ==
Alba Regia Sportcsarnok is an indoor stadium in the city. It hosts a number of sport clubs from amateur to professional level, with 2017 Hungarian basketball championship winner Alba Fehérvár being its most notable tenant.

Other city sports clubs include:

- Fehérvár FC (football)
- Székesfehérvári MÁV Előre SC (football)
- Fehérvár AV19 (ice hockey)
- Alba Fehérvár KC (handball)
- Fehérvár Enthroners (American football)
- Székesfehérvári Kempo SE (martial arts)
- Profi Kempo Akadémia - PKA

== Notable people ==
=== Born in Székesfehérvár ===
- Béla Balogh (1885–1945), film director
- Katalin Bogyay (b. 1956), journalist, diplomat
- Bendegúz Bolla (b. 1999), footballer
- Jenő Bory (1879–1959), sculptor, architect
- István Deák (1926–2023), historian
- Dávid Disztl (b. 1985), football player
- George Fisher (1795–1873), Serbian leader of the Texas Revolution
- Ignác Goldziher (1850–1921), orientalist
- Katarina Ivanović (1811–1882), early 19th century Serbian Biedermeier painter
- Péter Kuczka (1923–1999), writer
- Kornél Lánczos (1893–1974), physicist
- George Lang (1924–2011), restaurateur
- Lőrinc Mészáros (b. 1966), richest person in Hungary, former politician close to Fidesz
- Zsolt Nagy (b. 1993), footballer
- Viktor Orbán (b. 1963), Prime Minister of Hungary in 1998–2002 and 2010–2026
- Lajos Simicska (b. 1960), business magnate, former politician of Fidesz
- Bálint Szabó (b. 2001), football player
- Gyula Szekfű, historian
- Dominik Szoboszlai (b. 2000), football player
- Márk Tamás (b. 1993), football player
- Miklós Ybl (1814–1891), architect

=== Buried royalty ===
- Prince Saint Emeric of Hungary (1031)
- King Saint Stephen (1038)
- Coloman the Bookish (1116)
- Álmos the Blind (1129)
- Béla the Blind (1141)
- Géza II (1162)
- Stephen IV (1165)
- Agnes of Antioch (1184)
- Béla III (1196)
- Ladislaus III (1205)
- Charles I of Hungary (1342)
- Louis the Great (1382)
- Albert the Magnanimous (1439)
- Matthias Corvinus (1490)
- Vladislaus II of Bohemia and Hungary (1516)
- Louis II (1526)

=== Fictional ===
- Albert Horn, character in Louis Malle's film Lacombe, Lucien.

== Twin towns – sister cities ==
Székesfehérvár is twinned with:

- Alba Iulia, Romania
- Biograd na Moru, Croatia
- Birmingham, United States
- Blagoevgrad, Bulgaria
- Bratislava, Slovakia
- Cento, Italy
- Chorley, England, United Kingdom
- Erdenet, Mongolia
- Esztergom, Hungary
- Kemi, Finland
- Kocaeli, Turkey
- Luhansk, Ukraine
- Miercurea Ciuc, Romania
- Opole, Poland
- Schwäbisch Gmünd, Germany
- Zadar, Croatia
- Sariwon, North Korea

== See also ==
- Alba Iulia
