= List of Serbian neighborhoods =

This is a list of historical and traditional city neighborhoods or quarters with a significant Serbian population.

== Modern ==
Neighborhood	Location	Total population		Official			Estimation		
Neighborhood	Location	Population	Year	Serbs	%	Year	Serbs	%	Year
Balkan Mile	Hernals, Vienna, Austria	~10,000	2012					~80%	
Eller	Düsseldorf, NRW, Germany								
East Side	Chicago, IL, United States								
Eatonville	Toronto, Canada	19,131	2006	613	3.2%	2006	1,000-2,000	5-10%	
Irving Park	Chicago, IL, United States								
Norwood Park	Chicago, IL, United States								
Ridgewood	Queens, New York City, NY, United States								

== Historical ==
- Balkan Street, Zurich, Switzerland
- Belgrad Forest, Sarıyer, Istanbul, Turkey

After the sacking of Belgrade in the 16th century, Sultan Suleiman the Magnificent settled thousands of Serbs into the wooded area of Istanbul.

- Bournville, Birmingham, England, United Kingdom.

A community of Serbian refugees was allowed to settle after World War I, and more refugees came after World War II.

- Calumet Heights, Chicago, Illinois, United States
- Goodrich–Kirtland Park, Cleveland, Ohio, United States

Most Serbs lived in the area north of Superior Ave between East 20th and 40th streets. Hamilton and St.Clair avenues were particularly dense areas of Serbian settlement.

- Serbian Quarter, Prizren, Kosovo

The neighborhood was attacked in an Albanian Pogrom in 2004, burning several churches and buildings. Since then the Serb population has dropped dramatically.

- Serbian Quarter, Székesfehérvár, Hungary

Serbs settled during the Ottoman-Austrian wars in the 17th century.

- Serb Street, Budapest, Hungary
