= András Cser-Palkovics =

Hungarian politician (born 1974)

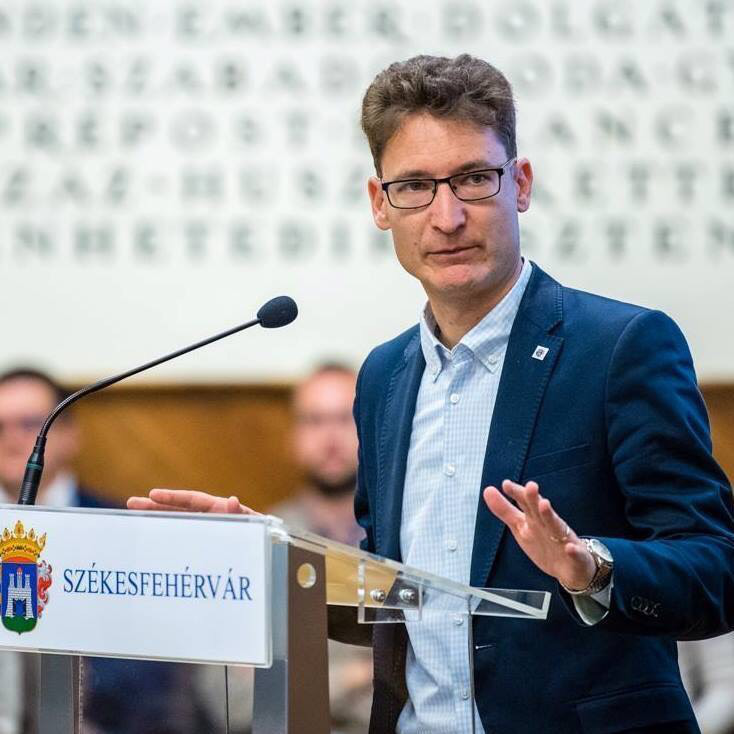

Mayor of Székesfehérvár
- Incumbent
- Assumed office 3 October 2010
- Preceded by: Tibor Viniczai

Member of the National Assembly
- In office 16 May 2006 – 5 May 2014

Personal details
- Born: 25 September 1974 (age 52) Székesfehérvár, Hungary
- Party: Fidesz
- Spouse: Edina Cser-Palkovics
- Children: Zalán; Ágoston; Emma
- Profession: politician
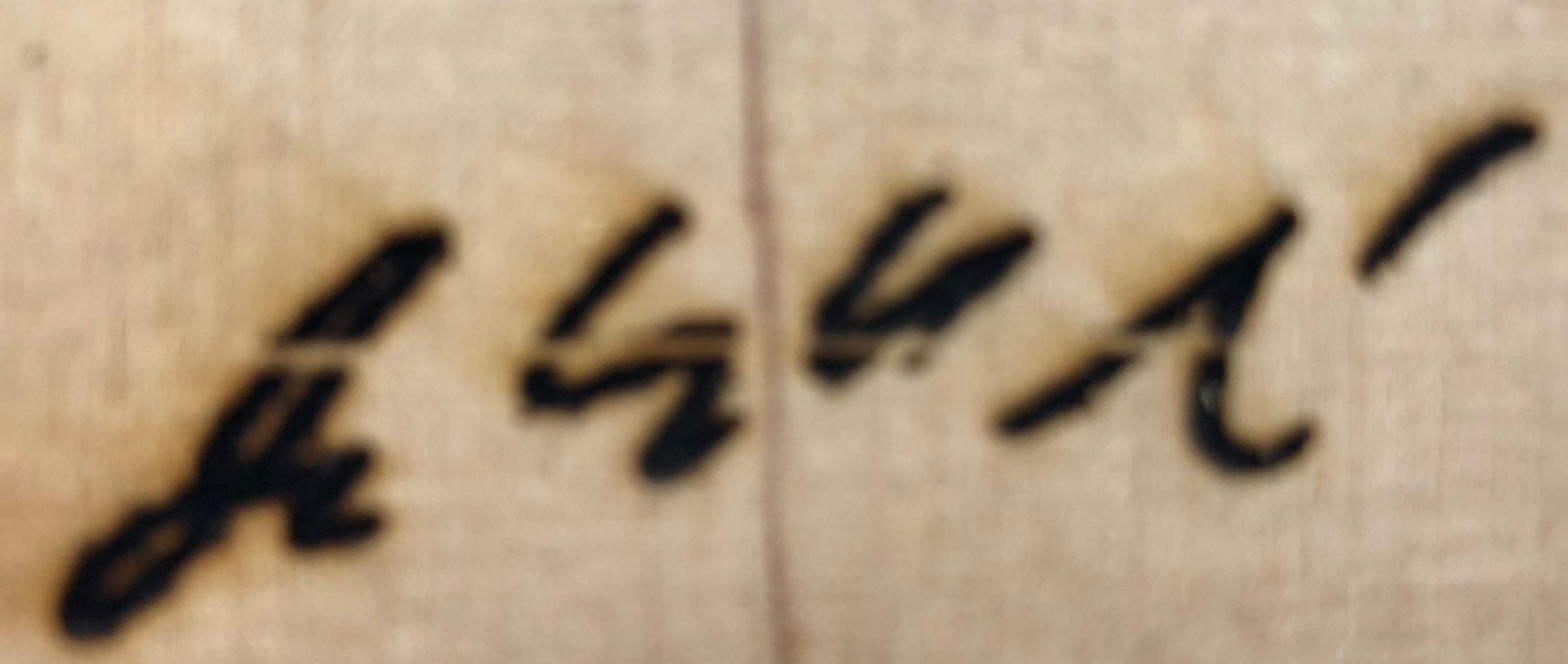
- Signature

András Cser-Palkovics (born 25 September 1974) is a Hungarian politician, member of the National Assembly (MP) for Székesfehérvár (Fejér County Constituency I) between 2010 and 2014. He was a Member of the Parliament from Fejér County Regional List between 2006 and 2010. He became mayor of Székesfehérvár in October 2010.

== Personal life ==
He is married. His wife is Edina Cser-Palkovics. They have a daughter, Emma and two sons, Zalán and Ágoston.

Political offices
Preceded by Tibor Viniczai	Mayor of Székesfehérvár; 2010–	Succeeded by Incumbent
