= Muslim Europe =

Geographical term

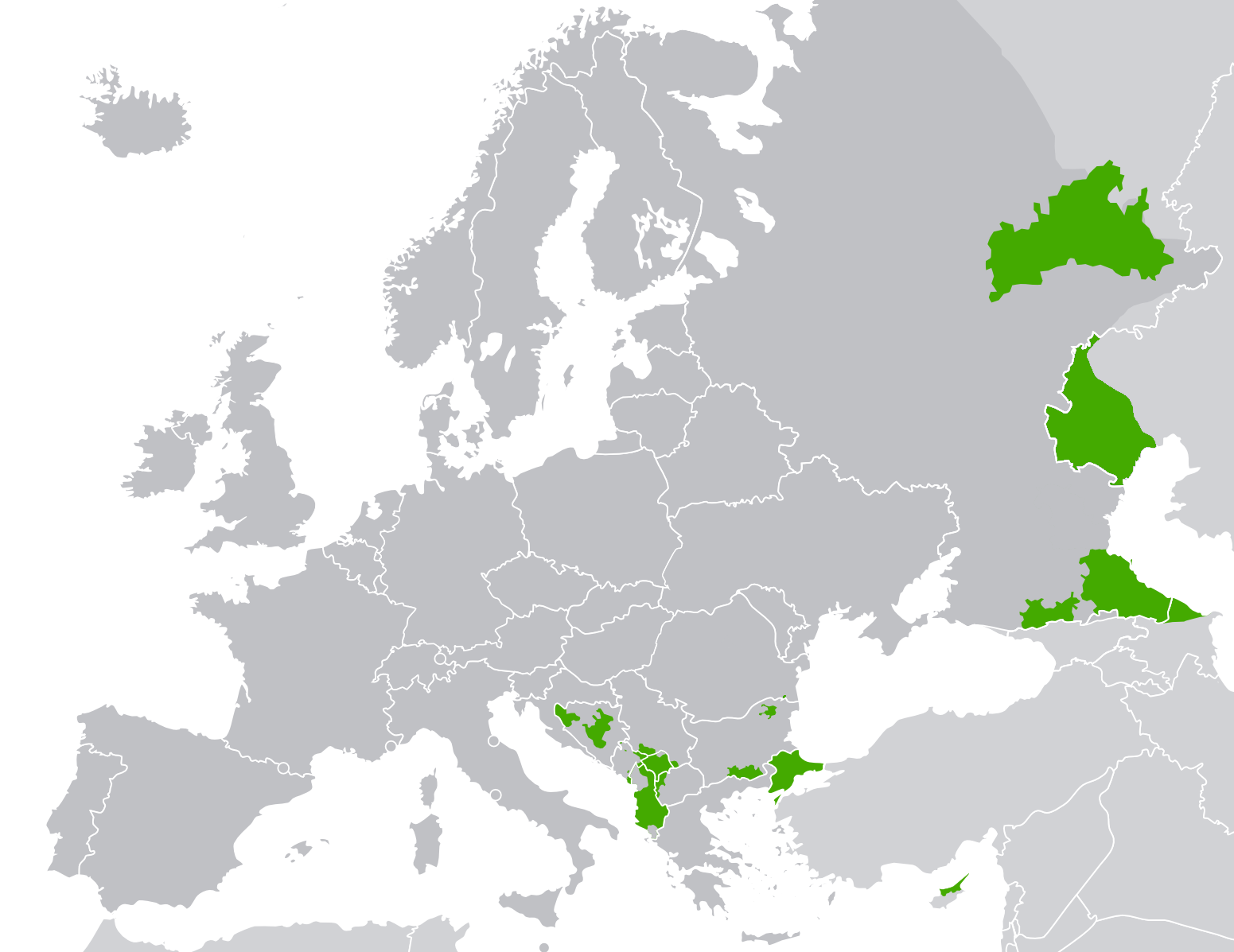
Territories inhabited by European Muslim ethnic groups (Albanians, Bosniaks, Tatars, Chechens, Bashkirs, Avars, Dargins, Kumyks, Kabardians, Ingush, Lezgins, Karachays, Laks, Tabasarans, Balkars, Circassians, Nogais, Abazins, Aghuls, Rutuls and Tsakhurs) and nearby peoples (Turks, Kazakhs and Azerbaijanis) in Europe.

The term "Muslim Europe" refers to territories in Europe inhabited by autochthonous European Muslim ethnic groups and nearby peoples. Currently, the European countries where they constitute a majority are Albania, Kosovo and Bosnia and Herzegovina, along with the European portions of Turkey, Kazakhstan, and Azerbaijan. Islam has had a historical stronghold in the Balkans since the Ottoman wars in Europe. It also includes Muslim-majority regions in other European nations, including western parts of North Macedonia, the Sandžak region within Serbia and Montenegro, the Rhodope Mountains in Bulgaria, and many Muslim-majority republics within Russia. "Muslim Europe" can also be used to describe the Muslim community in Europe.

As of 2012, the number of Muslims in Europe was estimated at 45 million, or 6% of the total population of Europe.

== See also ==
- European Islam – Hypothesized new branch of Islam

== Sources ==
- H. T. Norris (1993). Islam in the Balkans: Religion and Society Between Europe and the Arab World. Univ of South Carolina Press. ISBN 978-0-87249-977-5.
- Mesut Idriz; Osman Bakar (2014). Islam in Southeast Europe: Past Reflections and Future Prospects. ISBN 978-99917-1-276-5.
- Nezar AlSayyad; Manuel Castells (2002). Muslim Europe Or Euro-Islam: Politics, Culture, and Citizenship in the Age of Globalization. Lexington Books. pp. 33–. ISBN 978-0-7391-0339-5.
