= 2016–17 Vasas FC season =

Vasas
2016–17 season
- Chief executive: Miklós Vancsa
- Manager: Michael Oenning
- Stadium: Illovszky Rudolf Stadion (Old stadium); Bozsik József Stadion; Szusza Ferenc Stadion; Hidegkuti Nándor Stadion (Temporary stadiums)
- Nemzeti Bajnokság I: 3rd
- Magyar Kupa: Runners-up
- Top goalscorer: League: Martin Ádám (7); All: Mahir Sağlık (13)
- Highest home attendance: 5,045 v Videoton (29 October 2016, Nemzeti Bajnokság I)
- Lowest home attendance: 1,100 v Újpest (11 April 2017, Nemzeti Bajnokság I)
- Average home league attendance: 3,077
- Biggest win: 7–2 v Csorna (Away, 26 October 2016, Magyar Kupa); 5–0 v Mezőkövesd (Away, 17 May 2017, Magyar Kupa)
- Biggest defeat: 0–3 v Paks (Home, 6 May 2017, Nemzeti Bajnokság I)
Home colours	Away colours	Third colours

The 2016–17 season was Vasas Football Club's 86th competitive season, 2nd consecutive season in the Nemzeti Bajnokság I and 115th year in existence as a football club. In addition to the domestic league, Vasas participated in this season's editions of the Magyar Kupa.

This was the last season the team played at the Illovszky Rudolf Stadion built in 1960, before it is finally demolished to make room for the new ground. On 29 October 2016, first placed Vasas hosted second placed Videoton in a 1–1 draw in the Nemzeti Bajnokság I at the farewell match.

Vasas temporarily played at the home of teams from Budapest. The last two games of the first half of the season were played at the Bozsik József Stadion of Honvéd. In the second half of the season, the club played their home games at Újpest's Szusza Ferenc Stadion. In matches against the latter club, the home of the opposing team cannot be chosen as the venue for the matches between them for Vasas, according to the competition rules. Therefore, the Magyar Kupa match were played at the Hidegkuti Nándor Stadion of MTK, where the 26th round again at the Bozsik.

The team fought with Honvéd and Videoton for the title, which they finally had to relinquish due to the defeat against Paks in the 30th round. After 11 years, they also reached their 8th Magyar Kupa final, where they lost the match 5–4 on penalties following a 1–1 draw after extra time against Ferencváros.

== Squad ==
As of 28 April 2017

Note: Flags indicate national team as defined under FIFA eligibility rules; some limited exceptions apply. Players may hold more than one non-FIFA nationality.

No.	Pos.	Nation	Player
1	GK	HUN	Gergely Nagy
3	MF	CAN	Manjrekar James
4	DF	MKD	Kire Ristevski
6	MF	HUN	Donát Szivacski
7	DF	HUN	Szilveszter Hangya
8	FW	HUN	Martin Ádám
10	FW	HUN	Mohamed Remili
12	FW	HUN	Botond Király
13	MF	HUN	Zsombor Berecz
14	FW	HUN	Bálint Gaál
17	FW	UKR	Yevhen Pavlov

No.	Pos.	Nation	Player
19	DF	GER	Felix Burmeister
20	MF	HUN	Márk Kleisz
21	DF	HUN	Zsolt Korcsmár
23	MF	HUN	Máté Vida
27	FW	HUN	Benedek Murka
28	DF	HUN	Tamás Vaskó
33	GK	MNE	Vukašin Poleksić (loaned from Békéscsaba)
66	FW	TUR	Mahir Sağlık
70	FW	HUN	Tamás Kulcsár
89	DF	HUN	András Debreceni
90	GK	HUN	Dániel Póser

== Transfers ==
=== Transfers in ===
Transfer window	Pos.	No.	Player	From
Summer	FW	—	(Hungary) Patrik Horváth	Youth team
Summer	MF	—	(Hungary) Dávid Kovács	Youth team
Summer	DF	—	(Hungary) Zoltán Szilágyi	Youth team
Summer	DF	—	(Hungary) Olivér Tóth	Youth team
Summer	MF	3	(Canada) Manjrekar James	Diósgyőr
Summer	FW	12	(Hungary) Botond Király	Rákosmente
Summer	DF	19	(Germany) Felix Burmeister	Free agent (Note: Previous club Arminia Bielefeld.)
Summer	MF	20	(Hungary) Márk Kleisz	Youth team
Summer	DF	28	(Hungary) Tamás Vaskó	Békéscsaba
Summer	FW	66	(Turkey) Mahir Sağlık	Free agent (Note: Previous club SC Paderborn.)
Summer	FW	70	(Hungary) Tamás Kulcsár	Debrecen
Summer	FW	88	(Hungary) Dániel Gergye	Free agent (Note: Previous club Puskás Akadémia.)
Winter	FW	14	(Hungary) Bálint Gaál	Haladás

=== Transfers out ===
Transfer window	Pos.	No.	Player	To
Summer	DF	—	(Romania) László Tamás	Balmazújváros
Summer	FW	9	(Greece) Ilias Ignatidis	Released
Summer	MF	12	(Serbia) Miloš Adamović	(Serbia) Radnik Surdulica
Summer	MF	15	(Hungary) Mátyás Gál	Siófok
Summer	DF	26	(Hungary) Tamás Grúz	Budafok
Summer	GK	31	(Hungary) Bence Hermány	Released (Note: Joined Nyíregyháza.)
Summer	MF	37	(Germany) Christian Müller	Released
Summer	FW	42	(Hungary) Norbert Könyves	Debrecen
Summer	DF	93	(Croatia) Danijel Romić	(Israel) Hapoel Katamon
Winter	FW	77	(Hungary) Péter Czvitkovics	Released (Note: Joined Siófok.)

=== Loans in ===
Transfer window	Pos.	No.	Player	From	End date
Summer	GK	33	(Montenegro) Vukašin Poleksić	Békéscsaba	End of season

=== Loans out ===
Transfer window	Pos.	No.	Player	To	End date
Summer	FW	—	(Hungary) Patrik Horváth	Budaörs	End of season
Summer	MF	—	(Hungary) Dávid Kovács	Siófok	End of next season
Summer	DF	—	(Hungary) Zoltán Szilágyi	Siófok	End of next season
Summer	DF	—	(Hungary) Olivér Tóth	Budaörs	End of season
Summer	FW	99	(Hungary) Csanád Novák	Gyirmót	End of season
Winter	DF	2	(Hungary) Attila Osváth	Debrecen	End of season
Winter	DF	14	(Hungary) Csaba Preklet	Cegléd	End of season

== Competitions ==
=== Overview ===
Competition	First match	Last match	Starting round	Final position	Record							
Competition	First match	Last match	Starting round	Final position	Pld	W	D	L	GF	GA	GD	Win %
Nemzeti Bajnokság I	17 July 2016	27 May 2017	Matchday 1	3rd	33	15	7	11	50	40	+10	45.45
Magyar Kupa	14 September 2016	31 May 2017	Round of 128	Runners-up	10	8	1	1	30	8	+22	80.00
Total					43	23	8	12	80	48	+32	53.49

Source: Competitions

=== Nemzeti Bajnokság I ===
==== League table ====
Pos	Team	Pld	W	D	L	GF	GA	GD	Pts	Qualification or relegation
1	Honvéd (C)	33	20	5	8	55	30	+25	65	Qualification for the Champions League second qualifying round
2	Videoton	33	18	8	7	65	28	+37	62	Qualification for the Europa League first qualifying round (Note: Ferencváros qualified for the Europa League first qualifying round by winning the 2016–17 Magyar Kupa.)
3	Vasas	33	15	7	11	50	40	+10	52	Qualification for the Europa League first qualifying round
4	Ferencváros	33	14	10	9	54	44	+10	52	Qualification for the Europa League first qualifying round
5	Paks	33	11	12	10	41	37	+4	45	

Source: Hungarian Football Federation (in Hungarian), Soccerway
Rules for classification: 1) Points; 2) Matches won; 3) Goal difference; 4) Goals scored; 5) Head-to-head points; 6) Head-to-head goal difference; 7) Head-to-head away goals scored; 8) Fairplay; 9) Draw.
(C) Champions

==== Results summary ====
Overall								Home						Away					
Pld	W	D	L	GF	GA	GD	Pts	W	D	L	GF	GA	GD	W	D	L	GF	GA	GD
33	15	7	11	50	40	+10	52	7	4	5	28	21	+7	8	3	6	22	19	+3

Source: Hungarian Football Federation

==== Results by round ====
Round	1	2	3	4	5	6	7	8	9	10	11	12	13	14	15	16	17	18	19	20	21	22	23	24	25	26	27	28	29	30	31	32	33
Ground	A	H	A	H	A	H	A	H	A	A	H	H	A	H	A	H	A	H	A	H	H	A	A	H	A	H	A	H	A	H	A	A	H
Result	W	W	W	L	W	W	D	W	L	L	W	W	W	D	D	D	L	W	L	L	D	W	L	L	W	L	W	W	L	L	D	W	D
Position	4	2	2	2	1	1	1	1	1	1	1	1	1	1	1	1	1	1	3	3	3	3	3	3	3	3	3	3	3	4	4	3	3
Points	3	6	9	9	12	15	16	19	19	19	22	25	28	29	30	31	31	34	34	34	35	38	38	38	41	41	44	47	47	47	48	51	52

Source: Matches
A = Away; H = Home; W = Win; D = Draw; L = Loss

==== Matches ====
17 July 2016 1	MTK	0–1	Vasas	Dunaújváros (Note: The match was played at the Dunaújvárosi Stadion in Dunaújváros, instead of MTK regular stadium, the Hidegkuti Nándor Stadion in Budapest, built in 1947 which was demolished to make way to the newly built Hidegkuti Nándor Stadion.)
18:00 CEST (UTC+2)	Poór (yellow card) 55'	Report	Berecz (yellow card) 5'; Ádám 56'; Remili (yellow card) 73'	Stadium: Dunaújvárosi Stadion; Attendance: 638; Referee: Ádám Farkas

24 July 2016 2	Vasas	3–1	Debrecen	Budapest
18:00 CEST (UTC+2)	Korcsmár (yellow card) 32'; Berecz (yellow card) 52'; Ádám 54'; Vida (yellow card) 57'; Vaskó 85', 88'	Report	Ferenczi 33'; Tisza (yellow card) 64'	Stadium: Illovszky Rudolf Stadion; Attendance: 2,692; Referee: Tamás Bognár

31 July 2016 3	Videoton	1–2	Vasas	Felcsút (Note: The match was played at the Pancho Aréna in Felcsút, instead of Videoton regular stadium, the Sóstói Stadion in Székesfehérvár, built in 1967 which was demolished to make way to the newly built Sóstói Stadion.)
18:00 CEST (UTC+2)	Szolnoki (yellow card) 25'; Simon (yellow card) 53'; Vinícius (yellow card) 72', (goal) 90+4'	Report	Debreceni (yellow card) 16'; Szivacski (yellow card) 31'; Korcsmár (yellow card) 56', (goal) 70'; Berecz (yellow card) 76'; Pavlov 81'	Stadium: Pancho Aréna; Attendance: 1,500; Referee: Viktor Kassai

6 August 2016 4	Vasas	0–1	Újpest	Budapest
20:30 CEST (UTC+2)	Berecz (yellow card) 51'	Report	Kecskés (yellow card) 30'; Cseke (yellow card) 32'; Lázok (yellow card) 65'; Bardhi (yellow card) 84', (goal) 85'; Balázs (yellow card) 90+3'	Stadium: Illovszky Rudolf Stadion; Attendance: 4,629; Referee: Péter Solymosi

13 August 2016 5	Ferencváros	1–2	Vasas	Budapest
20:30 CEST (UTC+2)	Dilaver (yellow card) 12'; Trinks (yellow card) 20', (goal) 45'; Nalepa (yellow card) 90+3'	Report	Vaskó 28'; Ádám (yellow card) 32'; G. Nagy (yellow card) 63'; Hangya (yellow card) 76'; Szivacski (yellow card) 83'; Pavlov 89'; Vida (yellow card) 90+5'	Stadium: Groupama Arena; Attendance: 6,843; Referee: Zoltán Iványi

17 August 2016 6	Vasas	2–0	Honvéd	Budapest
19:00 CEST (UTC+2)	Berecz 28'; Ádám (yellow card) 48'; Osváth (yellow card) 70'; Remili 73'	Report	Holender (yellow card) 15'; Bobál (red card) 47'; Eppel (yellow card) 69'	Stadium: Illovszky Rudolf Stadion; Attendance: 4,375; Referee: Sándor Andó-Szabó

21 August 2016 7	Diósgyőr	1–1	Vasas	Miskolc
18:00 CEST (UTC+2)	Bacsa 35'; Elek (yellow card) 67'; Lázár (yellow card) 90+2'	Report	Ádám 37'; Szivacski (yellow card) 61'	Stadium: Diósgyőri Stadion; Attendance: 2,873; Referee: József Erdős

10 September 2016 8	Vasas	1–0	Paks	Budapest
18:00 CEST (UTC+2)	Ádám (yellow card) 27'; Kulcsár 33'; Vaskó (yellow card) 89'	Report	Kecskés (yellow card) 7'; Lenzsér (yellow card) 31'	Stadium: Illovszky Rudolf Stadion; Attendance: 3,612; Referee: István Vad

17 September 2016 9	Haladás	1–0	Vasas	Sopron (Note: The match was played at the Káposztás utcai Stadion in Sopron, instead of Haladás regular stadium, the Rohonci út in Szombathely, which was demolished to make way to the newly built Haladás Sportkomplexum.)
18:30 CEST (UTC+2)	Iszlai (yellow card) 21', (goal) 62'; Kovács (yellow card) 38'; Rózsa (yellow card) 88'; Bošnjak (red card) 90+3'	Report	Debreceni (yellow card) 18'; Vida (yellow card) 21'; Vaskó (yellow card) 90'; James (yellow card) 90+3'	Stadium: Káposztás utcai Stadion; Attendance: 2,136; Referee: Balázs Berke

21 September 2016 10	Gyirmót	1–0	Vasas	Győr
19:00 CEST (UTC+2)	Bojović (yellow card) 44'; Filkor 51'; Achim (yellow card) 58'; Novák (red card) 64'; Jancsó (yellow card) 73'; S. Nagy (yellow card) 83'	Report	James (yellow card) 49'; Szivacski (yellow card) 69'; Remili (yellow card) 79'	Stadium: Alcufer Stadion; Attendance: 1,400; Referee: Zsolt Szabó

24 September 2016 11	Vasas	4–0	Mezőkövesd	Budapest
18:00 CEST (UTC+2)	Ádám 43', 50'; Berecz 63'; Vida 90+1'	Report	Hudák (yellow card) 49'; Mevoungou (yellow card) 84'	Stadium: Illovszky Rudolf Stadion; Attendance: 2,832; Referee: Péter Solymosi

15 October 2016 12	Vasas	3–2	MTK	Budapest
18:00 CEST (UTC+2)	Ádám 18', (yellow card) 33'; Sağlık 23', 31'; Berecz (red card) 89'; Kulcsár (yellow card) 90+1'	Report	Vadnai 4'; Torghelle 21'; Vogyicska (yellow card) 38'; Vass (yellow card) 42'; Vukmir (yellow card) 44'	Stadium: Illovszky Rudolf Stadion; Attendance: 3,754; Referee: István Vad

22 October 2016 13	Debrecen	1–2	Vasas	Debrecen
17:30 CEST (UTC+2)	Holman 51'; Castillion (yellow card) 71'; Tőzsér (yellow card) 90+6'	Report	Murka 45'; Sağlık 56'; James (yellow card) 90+6'	Stadium: Nagyerdei Stadion; Attendance: 3,723; Referee: József Erdős

29 October 2016 14	Vasas	1–1	Videoton	Budapest
17:45 CEST (UTC+2)	Korcsmár (yellow card) 23'; Sağlık (yellow card) 34'; Remili 37'; Kleisz (yellow card) 52'; Ristevski (yellow card) 73'; Király (yellow card) 90+4'	Report	Szolnoki (yellow card) 11'; Fiola (yellow card) 24'; Stopira (yellow card) 79'; Lazović 90+2'; Hadžić (yellow card) 90+2'	Stadium: Illovszky Rudolf Stadion; Attendance: 5,045; Referee: Zoltán Iványi

5 November 2016 15	Újpest	2–2	Vasas	Kecskemét (Note: The match was played at the Széktói Stadion in Kecskemét, instead of Újpest regular stadium, the Szusza Ferenc Stadion in Budapest, due to the ongoing renovation. The demolition has begun of the Illovszky Rudolf Stadion in Budapest last, which were used as the temporary stadium during the renovation.)
18:00 CET (UTC+1)	Windecker 34'; Bardhi 61'	Report	Ristevski (yellow card) 32'; Sağlık 49', (yellow card) 87'; Korcsmár 76'; Vida (yellow card) 90+1'	Stadium: Széktói Stadion; Attendance: 1,442; Referee: Péter Solymosi

19 November 2016 16	Vasas	2–2	Ferencváros	Budapest
18:00 CET (UTC+1)	Vaskó (yellow card) 26'; Sağlık (red card) 86'; Ferenczi 88' (pen.), 90+3'	Report	Djuricin 9', (yellow card) 24'; D. Nagy (yellow card) 12'; Ramírez (red card) 49'; Nalepa (yellow card) 52'; Dilaver (yellow card) 68'; Gera (yellow card) 72', (goal) 90+2' (pen.)	Stadium: Bozsik József Stadion; Attendance: 3,425; Referee: Viktor Kassai

26 November 2016 17	Honvéd	2–1	Vasas	Budapest
15:30 CET (UTC+1)	Lovrić (yellow card) 33'; Holender (yellow card) 48'; Prosser 81'; Eppel 90+1'	Report	Remili (yellow card) 35'; Burmeister (yellow card) 61'; Pavlov 71', (yellow card) 82'; Ristevski (yellow card) 90'	Stadium: Bozsik József Stadion; Attendance: 2,908; Referee: Zoltán Iványi

3 December 2016 18	Vasas	3–0	Diósgyőr	Budapest
15:30 CET (UTC+1)	Burmeister (yellow card) 47'; Németh 58' (o.g.); Vaskó 61'; Berecz 75'	Report	Lázár (yellow card) 43'; Németh (yellow card) 63'	Stadium: Bozsik József Stadion; Attendance: 2,225; Referee: István Vad

10 December 2016 19	Paks	1–0	Vasas	Paks
15:30 CET (UTC+1)	Hahn 43'; Vernes (yellow card) 51'; Gévay (yellow card) 59'; Szakály (yellow card) 62'; Lenzsér (yellow card) 79'; Laczkó (yellow card) 87'	Report	Ádám (yellow card) 51'; Remili (yellow card) 59'; Burmeister (yellow card) 64'; Korcsmár (yellow card) 74'; Murka (yellow card) 89'	Stadium: Fehérvári úti Stadion; Attendance: 1,467; Referee: Ferenc Karakó

25 February 2017 21	Vasas	1–1	Gyirmót	Budapest
15:30 CET (UTC+1)	Vaskó (yellow card) 38'; Király 80'; Sağlık (yellow card) 90+3'	Report	Novák 25'; Simon (yellow card) 27'; Vass (yellow card) 70'; Bebeto (yellow card) 81'	Stadium: Szusza Ferenc Stadion; Attendance: 2,350; Referee: Ferenc Karakó

4 March 2017 22	Mezőkövesd	0–2	Vasas	Mezőkövesd
15:30 CET (UTC+1)	Tóth (yellow card) 37'; Farkaš (yellow card) 50'	Report	Ristevski 20'; Hangya (yellow card) 48'; Berecz 50'; James (yellow card) 86'	Stadium: Városi Stadion; Attendance: 2,200; Referee: József Erdős

11 March 2017 23	MTK	1–0	Vasas	Budapest
15:30 CET (UTC+1)	Ramos (yellow card) 14', (goal) 42'; Kolomoyets (yellow card) 53'; Kanta (yellow card) 69'	Report	Korcsmár (yellow card) 42'	Stadium: Hidegkuti Nándor Stadion; Attendance: 2,971; Referee: Tamás Bognár

16 March 2017 20	Vasas	2–3	Haladás	Budapest
17:30 CET (UTC+1)	Ristevski 47'; Nagy (yellow card) 54'; Sağlık 83'	Report	Wils (yellow card) 23'; Williams 25', 70'; Iszlai (yellow card) 30'; Kovács 51', (yellow card) 54'; Devecseri (yellow card) 56'; Rácz (yellow card) 64'; Halmosi (red card) 90+1'	Stadium: Szusza Ferenc Stadion; Attendance: 1,490; Referee: Balázs Berke
Note: The match was originally scheduled for 18 February 2017, but was postponed due to freezing conditions.

1 April 2017 24	Vasas	2–3	Debrecen	Budapest
18:00 CEST (UTC+2)	Ádám 45'; Vaskó 77'	Report	Tőzsér 26'; Burmeister 43' (o.g.); Szatmári (yellow card) 44'; Könyves 88'	Stadium: Szusza Ferenc Stadion; Attendance: 2,459; Referee: Csaba Pintér

8 April 2017 25	Videoton	1–2	Vasas	Felcsút
18:00 CEST (UTC+2)	Burmeister 45' (o.g.); Szolnoki (yellow card) 57'; Lazović (red card) 78'; Pátkai (yellow card) 80'	Report	Remili 6'; Ádám (yellow card) 27'; Ristevski (yellow card) 30'; Vaskó (yellow card) 68'; Hangya (red card) 78'; James (red card) 83'; Burmeister (yellow card) 87'; Murka 90+3'	Stadium: Pancho Aréna; Attendance: 2,469; Referee: Zsolt Szabó

11 April 2017 26	Vasas	2–3	Újpest	Budapest
18:00 CEST (UTC+2)	Debreceni (yellow card) 32'; Gaál 54'; Király 88'; Ferenczi (yellow card) 90+1'	Report	Heris 4'; Kecskés (yellow card) 38'; Balogh 45+1'; Mohl 61'	Stadium: Bozsik József Stadion; Attendance: 1,100; Referee: Sándor Andó-Szabó

15 April 2017 27	Ferencváros	1–2	Vasas	Budapest
20:30 CEST (UTC+2)	Sternberg 45+1', (yellow card) 83'; Dilaver (yellow card) 49'; Böde (yellow card) 53'; Nalepa (red card) 66'; Čukić (yellow card) 77'	Report	James (yellow card) 36'; Ristevski (yellow card) 45'; Remili (yellow card) 50'; Berecz 54'; Sağlık 56'	Stadium: Groupama Arena; Attendance: 5,044; Referee: Ádám Farkas

22 April 2017 28	Vasas	1–0	Honvéd	Budapest
20:30 CEST (UTC+2)	Burmeister 42'; Korcsmár (yellow card) 62'	Report	Zsótér (yellow card) 8'; Lovrić (yellow card) 45'	Stadium: Szusza Ferenc Stadion; Attendance: 4,854; Referee: József Erdős

29 April 2017 29	Diósgyőr	2–1	Vasas	Mezőkövesd (Note: The match was played at the Városi Stadion in Mezőkövesd, instead of Diósgyőr regular stadium, the Diósgyőri Stadion in Miskolc, opened in 1939 which was demolished to make way to the newly built Diósgyőri Stadion.)
18:00 CEST (UTC+2)	Szarka 6', (yellow card) 34'; Karan (yellow card) 25'; Lipták (red card) 74'; Makrai 85', (yellow card) 90+4'	Report	James (yellow card) 32'; Vaskó (yellow card) 42'; Ristevski (yellow card) 57'; Burmeister 71', (yellow card) 76'	Stadium: Városi Stadion; Attendance: 3,656; Referee: Viktor Kassai

6 May 2017 30	Vasas	0–3	Paks	Budapest
18:00 CEST (UTC+2)	Ristevski (yellow card) 30'; Korcsmár (yellow card) 54'	Report	Lenzsér 8'; Gévay (yellow card) 28'; D. Kulcsár (yellow card) 31'; Bartha 84'; Hahn 90+2'	Stadium: Szusza Ferenc Stadion; Attendance: 2,000; Referee: István Vad

13 May 2017 31	Haladás	2–2	Vasas	Sopron
18:00 CEST (UTC+2)	Iszlai 49'; Schimmer 89'	Report	Korcsmár (yellow card) 30'; Burmeister 36'; Hangya (yellow card) 65'; Gaál 72'	Stadium: Káposztás utcai Stadion; Attendance: 2,435; Referee: István Vad

20 May 2017 32	Gyirmót	1–2	Vasas	Győr
18:00 CEST (UTC+2)	Radeljić (yellow card) 42'; Présinger (yellow card) 53'; Csiki 55'; Szalánszki (red card) 79'; Bojović (yellow card) 90+2'	Report	Kulcsár 9'; Berecz 67'	Stadium: Alcufer Stadion; Attendance: 500; Referee: Péter Solymosi

27 May 2017 33	Vasas	1–1	Mezőkövesd	Budapest
19:00 CEST (UTC+2)	Vaskó 72'	Report	Fótyik (red card) 41'; Vági 49'	Stadium: Szusza Ferenc Stadion; Attendance: 2,400; Referee: Balázs Berke

=== Magyar Kupa ===
14 September 2016 Round of 128	Testvériség	0–4	Vasas	Budapest
15:30 CEST (UTC+2)		Report	Korcsmár 25'; James 51'; Ferenczi 79'; Czvitkovics 86'	Stadium: Barátság Sporttelep; Attendance: 800; Referee: László Lovas

26 October 2016 Round of 64	Csorna	2–7	Vasas	Csorna
13:30 CEST (UTC+2)	Császár (yellow card) 49'; Kerékgyártó 71'; Folmer 90'	Report	Korcsmár 16'; Hangya 35'; Vaskó 40' (pen.); Ferenczi 50', 74'; Sağlık 60', 76'	Stadium: Kocsis István Sporttelep; Attendance: 600; Referee: Ákos Gaál

29 November 2016 Round of 32	Győr	2–3	Vasas	Győr
18:00 CET (UTC+1)	Rácz 39' (pen.); L. Szabó 46'; Varga (yellow card) 53'; Németh (yellow card) 58'	Report	Sağlık 11'; Kulcsár (yellow card) 61'; Remili 79'; Pavlov 90+1'	Stadium: ETO Park; Attendance: 1,050; Referee: Péter Zierkelbach

==== Round of 16 ====
11 February 2017 First leg	Dorog	1–2	Vasas	Dorog
14:00 CET (UTC+1)	Mészáros (yellow card) 13', (goal) 36'; Hauser (yellow card) 59'	Report	Sağlık 4', (yellow card) 89'; Murka 53'; Hangya (yellow card) 54'; Burmeister (yellow card) 77'	Stadium: Buzánszky Jenő Stadion; Attendance: 1,500; Referee: Tibor II Gyarmati

28 February 2017 Second leg	Vasas	4–0 (6–1 agg.)	Dorog	Budapest
14:30 CET (UTC+1)	Berecz 10'; Kleisz 42'; Sağlık 48', 59'	Report	Perović (yellow card) 56'	Stadium: Szusza Ferenc Stadion; Referee: Róbert Nagy
Note: Vasas won 6–1 on aggregate.

==== Quarter-finals ====
29 March 2017 First leg	Újpest	1–2	Vasas	Budapest
20:00 CET (UTC+1)	Lázok 5'; Mohl (yellow card) 7'; Diarra (yellow card) 38'; Heris (yellow card) 74'; Kálnoki-Kis (red card) 90'	Report	James (yellow card) 38', (goal) 62'; Vaskó (yellow card) 42'; Remili 86'	Stadium: Szusza Ferenc Stadion; Attendance: 1,733; Referee: István Vad

5 April 2017 Second leg	Vasas	0–1 ((a) 2–2 agg.)	Újpest	Budapest
20:30 CEST (UTC+2)	Gaál (yellow card) 49'; James (yellow card) 66'	Report	Andrić 45+2'; Heris (yellow card) 81'	Stadium: Hidegkuti Nándor Stadion; Attendance: 1,300; Referee: Gergely Szőts
Note: 2–2 on aggregate. Vasas won on away goals.

==== Semi-finals ====
26 April 2017 First leg	Vasas	2–0	Mezőkövesd	Budapest
16:00 CEST (UTC+2)	Berecz 45+1' (pen.); Kulcsár 49'	Report	Egerszegi (yellow card) 45'; Diallo (yellow card) 53'	Stadium: Szusza Ferenc Stadion; Referee: Péter Solymosi

17 May 2017 Second leg	Mezőkövesd	0–5 (0–7 agg.)	Vasas	Mezőkövesd
20:00 CEST (UTC+2)	Tóth (yellow card) 32'; Farkaš (yellow card) 51'; Veselinović (yellow card) 52'	Report	Berecz 4'; Kulcsár 27'; Ristevski (yellow card) 52'; Sağlık 68'; Ádám 71'; Hangya 86'	Stadium: Városi Stadion; Attendance: 1,105; Referee: Csaba Pintér
Note: Vasas won 7–0 on aggregate.

==== Final ====
31 May 2017 Final	Vasas	1–1 (a.e.t.) (4–5 p)	Ferencváros	Budapest
19:00 CEST (UTC+2)	Burmeister (yellow card) 24'; Remili (yellow card) 37'; Sağlık (yellow card) 42'; Kulcsár 47'	Report	Varga 25'; Moutari (yellow card) 80'; Čukić (yellow card) 97'	Stadium: Groupama Arena; Attendance: 14 970; Referee: Péter Solymosi
	Penalties
	Remili (penalty scored); Berecz (penalty scored); Ristevski (penalty missed); Vida (penalty scored); Gaál (penalty scored)		(penalty scored) Varga; (penalty scored) Leandro; (penalty scored) Radó; (penalty scored) Sternberg; (penalty scored) Čukić

== Statistics ==
=== Overall ===
Appearances (Apps) numbers are for appearances in competitive games only, including sub appearances.
Source: Competitions

No.	Player	Pos.	Nemzeti Bajnokság I				Magyar Kupa				Total			
No.	Player	Pos.	Apps	Goal	Booked	Sent off (straight red)	Apps	Goal	Booked	Sent off (straight red)	Apps	Goal	Booked	Sent off (straight red)
1	(Hungary) Gergely Nagy	GK	29		2		5				34		2	
2	(Hungary) Attila Osváth	DF	3		1		2				5		1	
3	(Canada) Manjrekar James	MF	11		6	1	6	2	2		17	2	8	1
4	(North Macedonia) Kire Ristevski	DF	31	2	7		8		1		39	2	8	
6	(Hungary) Donát Szivacski	MF	15		4		3				18		4	
7	(Hungary) Szilveszter Hangya	DF	30		3	1	8	2	1		38	2	4	1
8	(Hungary) Martin Ádám	FW	24	7	6		6	1			30	8	6	
10	(Hungary) Mohamed Remili	FW	30	3	5		9	2	1		39	5	6	
12	(Hungary) Botond Király	FW	10	2	1		5				15	2	1	
13	(Hungary) Zsombo Berecz	MF	32	6	4	1	9	3			41	9	4	1
14	(Hungary) Bálint Gaál	FW	13	2			5		1		18	2	1	
14	(Hungary) Csaba Preklet	DF					1				1			
17	(Ukraine) Yevhen Pavlov	FW	20	3	1		2	1			22	4	1	
19	(Germany) Felix Burmeister	DF	27	3	5		8		2		35	3	7	
20	(Hungary) Márk Kleisz	MF	20		1		7	1			27	1	1	
21	(Hungary) Zsolt Korcsmár	DF	23	2	8		7	2			30	4	8	
23	(Hungary) Máté Vida	MF	25	1	4		5				30	1	4	
24	(Hungary) Zoltán Tomori	GK												
27	(Hungary) Benedek Murka	FW	20	2	1		5	1			25	3	1	
28	(Hungary) Tamás Vaskó	DF	24	6	6		8	1	1		32	7	7	
33	(Montenegro) Vukašin Poleksić	GK	4								4			
39	(Hungary) István Ferenczi	FW	6	2	1		2	3			8	5	1	
42	(Hungary) Norbert Könyves	FW	1								1			
66	(Turkey) Mahir Sağlık	FW	25	6	3	1	10	7	2		35	13	5	1
70	(Hungary) Tamás Kulcsár	FW	12	2	1		6	3	1		18	5	2	
77	(Hungary) Péter Czvitkovics	FW	5				2	1			7	1		
88	(Hungary) Dániel Gergye	FW					1				1			
89	(Hungary) András Debreceni	DF	16		3		4				20		3	
90	(Hungary) Dániel Póser	GK					5				5			
98	(Hungary) Áron Borvető	FW												
99	(Hungary) Csanád Novák	FW	4								4			
99	(Hungary) Botond Szabó	MF												
Own goals				1								1		
Totals				50	73	4		30	12			80	85	4

=== Clean sheets ===
			Clean sheets		
No.	Player	Games Played	Nemzeti Bajnokság I	Magyar Kupa	Total
1	(Hungary) Gergely Nagy	34	6	1	7
90	(Hungary) Dániel Póser	5		3	3
33	(Montenegro) Vukašin Poleksić	4	1		1
24	(Hungary) Zoltán Tomori	0			0
Totals			7	4	11
