= 2017–18 Vasas FC season =

Vasas
2017–18 season
- Manager: Michael Oenning
- Stadium: Szusza Ferenc Stadion
- Nemzeti Bajnokság I: 12th (relegated)
- Magyar Kupa: Round of 64
- UEFA Europa League: First qualifying round
- Top goalscorer: League: Bálint Gaál (6); All: Bálint Gaál (6)
- Highest home attendance: 4,016 vs Beitar Jerusalem (6 July 2017); UEFA Europa League
- Lowest home attendance: 600 vs Budapest Honvéd (10 March 2018); Nemzeti Bajnokság I
- Average home league attendance: 1,320
- Biggest win: 4–1 vs Budapest Honvéd (A) (30 September 2017); Nemzeti Bajnokság I
- Biggest defeat: 0–5 vs Diósgyőr (A) (14 October 2017); Nemzeti Bajnokság I

The 2017–18 season was Vasas Football Club's 87th competitive season, 3rd consecutive season in the Nemzeti Bajnokság I and 116th year in existence as a football club. In addition to the domestic league, Vasas participated in this season's editions of the Magyar Kupa and UEFA Europa League. The season covered the period from 30 May 2017 to 2 June 2018.

Following the rebuilding of Illovszky Rudolf Stadion, Vasas played most of their home fixtures at Szusza Ferenc Stadion during this season. There were concerns that the stadium will not meet stadium heating obligations, but a mobile track heating device lifted the problem.

This was the team's first ever qualifying phase in the UEFA Europa League after the format change since their last participation in 2000–01. Vasas entered the competition in the first qualifying round where they were defeated by Beitar Jerusalem.

The club entered the last rounds of the league in a fierce relegation battle between Diósgyőr, Balmazújváros, Haladás, Mezőkövesd and eventually finishing in the bottom. After finishing third and reaching Magyar Kupa final last season, Vasas will not play in Hungary's top-flight next season.

== First team squad ==
Note: Flags indicate national team as defined under FIFA eligibility rules; some limited exceptions apply. Players may hold more than one non-FIFA nationality.

No.	Pos.	Nation	Player
1	GK	HUN	Gergely Nagy
3	DF	CAN	Manjrekar James
4	DF	MKD	Kire Ristevski
6	MF	HUN	Donát Szivacski
7	MF	HUN	Szilveszter Hangya
8	FW	HUN	Martin Ádám
9	FW	HUN	Norbert Csiki
10	FW	HUN	Mohamed Remili (captain)
13	MF	HUN	Zsombor Berecz
14	FW	HUN	Bálint Gaál
17	FW	UKR	Yevhen Pavlov
19	DF	GER	Felix Burmeister

No.	Pos.	Nation	Player
20	MF	HUN	Márk Kleisz
23	MF	HUN	Máté Vida
27	FW	HUN	Benedek Murka
28	DF	HUN	Tamás Vaskó
31	MF	HUN	Dávid Barczi
32	DF	CZE	Vít Beneš
40	FW	HUN	István Ferenczi
77	MF	HUN	Tamás Egerszegi
86	FW	HUN	Zsolt Laczkó
87	GK	SVK	Ľuboš Kamenár
90	GK	HUN	Dániel Póser
98	MF	HUN	Bálint Vogyicska

== Transfers ==
=== Summer ===
In: Note: Flags indicate national team as defined under FIFA eligibility rules; some limited exceptions apply. Players may hold more than one non-FIFA nationality.

No.	Pos.	Nation	Player
2	DF	HUN	Attila Osváth (loan return from Debrecen)
12	FW	GRE	Nikos Vergos (loan from (Greece) Olympiacos)
14	DF	HUN	Csaba Preklet (loan return from Cegléd)
15	DF	HUN	Máté Czingráber (loan return from Siófok)
22	DF	CZE	Jan Šimůnek (from (Czech Republic) Dukla Prague)
32	DF	CZE	Vít Beneš (from (Czech Republic) Jablonec)
87	GK	SVK	Ľuboš Kamenár (from (Poland) Śląsk Wrocław)
98	MF	HUN	Bálint Vogyicska (loan from MTK Budapest)
99	FW	HUN	Csanád Novák (loan return from Gyirmót)

Out: Note: Flags indicate national team as defined under FIFA eligibility rules; some limited exceptions apply. Players may hold more than one non-FIFA nationality.

No.	Pos.	Nation	Player
2	DF	HUN	Attila Osváth (to Puskás Akadémia)
14	DF	HUN	Csaba Preklet (to Cegléd)
21	DF	HUN	Zsolt Korcsmár (to (Denmark) Midtjylland)
33	GK	MNE	Vukašin Poleksić (loan return to Békéscsaba)
66	FW	TUR	Mahir Sağlık (to (Turkey) Sakaryaspor)
89	DF	HUN	András Debreceni (to Győr)
98	FW	HUN	Áron Borvető (to Vác)
99	FW	HUN	Csanád Novák (to Mezőkövesd)

=== Winter ===
In: Note: Flags indicate national team as defined under FIFA eligibility rules; some limited exceptions apply. Players may hold more than one non-FIFA nationality.

No.	Pos.	Nation	Player
9	FW	HUN	Norbert Csiki (from Gyirmót)
31	MF	HUN	Dávid Barczi (from Videoton)
77	MF	HUN	Tamás Egerszegi (from (Poland) Miedź Legnica)
86	FW	HUN	Zsolt Laczkó (from Paks)

Out: Note: Flags indicate national team as defined under FIFA eligibility rules; some limited exceptions apply. Players may hold more than one non-FIFA nationality.

No.	Pos.	Nation	Player
9	MF	HUN	Botond Király (loan to Csákvár)
12	FW	GRE	Nikos Vergos (loan return to (Greece) Olympiacos)
15	DF	HUN	Máté Czingráber (to Soproni VSE)
22	DF	CZE	Jan Šimůnek (Retired)
70	FW	HUN	Tamás Kulcsár (to MTK Budapest)

== Competitions ==
=== Overview ===
Competition	First match	Last match	Starting round	Final position	Record							
Competition	First match	Last match	Starting round	Final position	Pld	W	D	L	GF	GA	GD	Win %
Nemzeti Bajnokság I	16 July 2017	2 June 2018	Matchday 1	12th	33	9	7	17	38	61	−23	27.27
Magyar Kupa	20 September 2017	25 October 2017	Round of 128	Round of 64	2	1	0	1	3	2	+1	50.00
UEFA Europa League	29 June 2017	6 July 2017	First qualifying round	First qualifying round	2	0	0	2	3	7	−4	0.00
Total					37	10	7	20	44	70	−26	27.03

Source: Competitions

=== Nemzeti Bajnokság I ===
==== League table ====
Pos	Team	Pld	W	D	L	GF	GA	GD	Pts	Qualification or relegation
8	Szombathelyi Haladás	33	11	5	17	35	50	−15	38	
9	Mezőkövesd	33	9	10	14	35	52	−17	37	
10	Diósgyőr	33	10	6	17	44	53	−9	36	
11	Balmazújváros (R)	33	8	12	13	39	46	−7	36	Relegation to the Nemzeti Bajnokság II
12	Vasas (R)	33	9	7	17	38	61	−23	34	Relegation to the Nemzeti Bajnokság II

Source: Hungarian Football Federation (in Hungarian), Soccerway
Rules for classification: 1) Points; 2) Matches won; 3) Goal difference; 4) Goals scored; 5) Head-to-head points; 6) Head-to-head goal difference; 7) Head-to-head away goals scored; 8) Fair play ranking; 9) Drawing of lots.
(R) Relegated

==== Results summary ====
Overall								Home						Away					
Pld	W	D	L	GF	GA	GD	Pts	W	D	L	GF	GA	GD	W	D	L	GF	GA	GD
33	9	7	17	38	61	−23	34	6	3	8	17	23	−6	3	4	9	21	38	−17

Source: Hungarian Football Federation

==== Results by round ====
Round	1	2	3	4	5	6	7	8	9	10	11	12	13	14	15	16	17	18	19	20	21	22	23	24	25	26	27	28	29	30	31	32	33
Ground	H	A	H	A	H	A	H	A	H	H	A	A	H	A	H	A	H	A	H	A	A	H	H	A	H	A	H	A	H	A	H	H	A
Result	L	W	W	L	D	L	W	L	W	W	W	L	L	D	L	D	L	L	L	L	L	W	D	D	L	L	D	W	L	D	L	W	L
Position	12	6	2	4	4	5	4	7	6	4	3	4	4	6	7	7	7	8	9	10	11	9	9	8	10	12	12	10	11	10	12	11	12

Source: Matches
A = Away; H = Home; W = Win; D = Draw; L = Loss

==== Matches ====
16 July 2017 1	Vasas	0–2	Diósgyőr	Budapest
17:00 CET (UTC+1)	Ristevski (yellow card) 36'; Kulcsár (yellow card) 67'; Vida (yellow card) 87'	Report	Vela 5', (yellow card) 38'; Nono (yellow card) 66'; Makrai (yellow card) 70'; Szarka 73'; Tóth (yellow card) 90+2'	Stadium: Szusza Ferenc stadion Attendance: 2,514; Referee: Tamás Bognár

23 July 2017 2	Balmazújváros	0–1	Vasas	Balmazújváros
18:00 CEST (UTC+2)	Habovda (yellow card) 27'; Sigér (yellow card) 32'; Haris (yellow card) 62'; Fekete (yellow card) 87'	Report	Remili 5'; Murka (yellow card) 9'; Kleisz (yellow card) 38'; Kulcsár (yellow card) 77'	Stadium: Városi Sportpálya; Attendance: 1,396; Referee: Sándor Andó-Szabó

30 July 2017 3	Vasas	2–0	Puskás Akadémia	Budapest
18:00 CEST (UTC+2)	Burmeister 41'; Vaskó (yellow card) 59'; Kulcsár 74'	Report		Stadium: Szusza Ferenc stadion Attendance: 1,500; Referee: József Erdős

6 August 2017 4	Újpest	1–0	Vasas	Budapest
20:00 CEST (UTC+2)	Nagy 25'	Report		Stadium: Szusza Ferenc stadion Attendance: 0 Referee: Péter Solymosi
Note: As of HFF decision the fixture were played on closed doors and the start date postponed from 18:00 due to excessive heat.

12 August 2017 5	Vasas	1–1	Mezőkövesd	Budapest
18:00 CEST (UTC+2)	Kulcsár 60'; Ádám (yellow card) 65'; Kamenár (yellow card) 83'; Burmeister (yellow card) 84'	Report	Hudák (yellow card) 39'; Pillár 90'; Majtán (yellow card) 90+1'	Stadium: Szusza Ferenc Stadion; Attendance: 1,700; Referee: Balázs Berke

18 August 2017 6	Debrecen	4–1	Vasas	Debrecen
19:30 CEST (UTC+2)	Tőzsér 27' (pen.), 43'; Mengolo 30'; Varga 36'	Report	Szivacski 66', (yellow card) 70'	Stadium: Nagyerdei Stadion; Attendance: 3,634; Referee: Zoltán Iványi

26 August 2017 7	Vasas	3–1	Paks	Budapest
18:00 CEST (UTC+2)	James 22'; Gaál 41'; Pavlov (yellow card) 89'; Burmeister (yellow card) 90'; Kulcsár (yellow card) 90+2'; Hangya 90+7'	Report	Lenzsér (yellow card) 24'; Bartha 45'; Hajdú (yellow card) 90+6'	Stadium: Szusza Ferenc Stadion; Attendance: 1,000; Referee: Tamás Bognár

9 September 2017 8	Ferencváros	5–2	Vasas	Budapest
18:00 CEST (UTC+2)	Paintsil 32'; Pedroso (yellow card) 43'; Varga 62', 81', 90+3' (pen.); Priskin 84'	Report	Kulcsár 14'; Ristevski (yellow card) 52'; Hangya (yellow card) 55'; Gaál 60'; Szivacski (red card) 72'; James (yellow card) 90+2'	Stadium: Groupama Arena; Attendance: 7,135; Referee: Tamás Bognár

16 September 2017 9	Vasas	3–1	Videoton	Budapest
18:00 CEST (UTC+2)	Burmeister 22', 82'; Ristevski 28'; James (yellow card) 34'; Gaál (yellow card) 54'; Vogyicska (yellow card) 65'; Hangya (yellow card) 78'; Remili (yellow card) 82'	Report	Pátkai 12', (yellow card) 56'; Fiola (yellow card) 43'; Nego (red card) 89'; Lazović (red card) 90+4'	Stadium: Szusza Ferenc Stadion; Attendance: 2,000; Referee: Sándor Andó-Szabó

30 September 2017 11	Budapest Honvéd	1–4	Vasas	Budapest
20:30 CEST (UTC+2)	Eppel (yellow card) 68'; Cirino 76'; Kamber (red card) 86'	Report	Remili 15', 48', 90+3'; Vaskó (yellow card) 20'; Ristevski (yellow card) 31'; Gaál 52'; James (yellow card) 65'; Kulcsár (yellow card) 88'; Kamenár (yellow card) 89'	Stadium: Bozsik József Stadion; Attendance: 2,522; Referee: Viktor Kassai

14 October 2017 12	Diósgyőr	5–0	Vasas	Debrecen
15:30 CEST (UTC+2)	Nono 14'; Lipták (yellow card) 19'; Ugrai 48', 58'; Eperjesi (yellow card) 51'; Vela 71'; Ioannidis 77'; Forgács (yellow card) 88'	Report	Remili (yellow card) 15'; Berecz (yellow card) 63'	Stadium: Nagyerdei Stadion; Attendance: 1,081; Referee: Csaba Pintér

17 October 2017 10	Vasas	1–0	Haladás	Budapest
18:00 CEST (UTC+2)	Berecz (yellow card) 14'; Gaál 28', (yellow card) 81'; Vida (yellow card) 33'	Report	Kiss (yellow card) 43'; Medgyes (yellow card) 84'	Stadium: Szusza Ferenc Stadion; Attendance: 1,000; Referee: Gergely Szőts
Note: The match was originally played on 23 September 2017, but was interrupted due to failure of illumination after 22 minutes of playing.

21 October 2017 13	Vasas	1–2	Balmazújváros	Budapest
15:30 CET (UTC+1)	Burmeister (yellow card) 38'; Szivacski (yellow card) 50'; Hangya (yellow card) 53'; Remili 59'	Report	Sigér (yellow card) 31', (goal) 32'; Maisuradze (yellow card) 41'; Arabuli 43'; Póti (yellow card) 88'; Vayda (yellow card) 90+3'	Stadium: Szusza Ferenc Stadion; Attendance: 1,034; Referee: Sándor Andó-Szabó

28 October 2017 14	Puskás Akadémia	0–0	Vasas	Felcsút
17:45 CEST (UTC+2)	Bačelić-Grgić (yellow card) 52'; Vanczák (yellow card) 60'	Report	Ádám (yellow card) 44'; Burmeister (yellow card) 76'	Stadium: Pancho Arena; Attendance: 986; Referee: Ádám Farkas

4 November 2017 15	Vasas	0–1	Újpest	Dunaújváros
15:30 CET (UTC+1)		Report	Pávkovics (yellow card) 41'; Novothny (yellow card) 45', (goal) 69'; Mohl (yellow card) 89'	Stadium: Dunaújvárosi Stadion (Note: The match was played at Dunaújváros Stadion, Dunaújváros, instead of temporary stadium Szusza Ferenc Stadion, Budapest, due to Vasas cannot choose the same venue as their opponent's home to play.); Attendance: 1,200; Referee: Zoltán Iványi

18 November 2017 16	Mezőkövesd	3–3	Vasas	Mezőkövesd
15:30 CET (UTC+1)	Koszta 13', 59', (yellow card) 69'; Střeštík 64'; Lázár (yellow card) 81'; Vadnai (yellow card) 84'	Report	Burmeister 28'; Berecz 63', (yellow card) 76'; Gaál 66'; Vaskó (yellow card) 83'	Stadium: Városi Stadion; Attendance: 2,430; Referee: Zsolt Szabó

25 November 2017 17	Vasas	1–5	Debrecen	Budapest
15:30 CET (UTC+1)	Ádám 81' (pen.); Berecz (yellow card) 90+2'	Report	Takács 18', 36'; Varga (yellow card) 26'; Sós 73'; Mengolo 90+1', 90+3'	Stadium: Szusza Ferenc Stadion; Attendance: 618; Referee: József Erdős

2 December 2017 18	Paks	3–1	Vasas	Paks
15:30 CET (UTC+1)	Nikházi (yellow card) 52'; Szabó 56', 62'; Lenzsér 73'	Report	Pavlov 72'; Szivacski (yellow card) 82'; Ádám (yellow card) 89'; James (red card) 90+1'	Stadium: Fehérvári úti Stadion; Attendance: 842; Referee: Péter Solymosi

9 December 2017 19	Vasas	0–2	Ferencváros	Budapest
19:30 CET (UTC+1)	Szivacski (yellow card) 60'	Report	Lovrencsics 2'; Spirovski (yellow card) 89'; Gorriarán 90+3'	Stadium: Szusza Ferenc Stadion; Attendance: 1,800; Referee: Csaba Pintér

24 February 2018 20	Videoton	2–1	Vasas	Felcsút
17:00 CET (UTC+1)	Hadžić 26', (yellow card) 79'; Šćepović 60'; Lazović (yellow card) 70'; Fiola (yellow card) 90+3'	Report	Ádám 40', (yellow card) 51'; Ristevski (yellow card) 62'; Barczi (red card) 72'; Burmeister (yellow card) 88'	Stadium: Pancho Arena; Attendance: 1,525; Referee: Zsolt Szabó

3 March 2018 21	Haladás	3–0	Vasas	Szombathely
17:00 CET (UTC+1)	Kovács 26', (yellow card) 45'; Mészáros (yellow card) 39'; Rácz 47'; Ramos 60'	Report	Remili (yellow card) 16'; Vida (yellow card) 58'; Hangya (yellow card) 62'; James (yellow card) 75'	Stadium: Haladás Sportkomplexum; Attendance: 2,866; Referee: Balázs Berke

10 March 2018 22	Vasas	2–1	Budapest Honvéd	Budapest
17:00 CET (UTC+1)	Berecz 10'; Ádám (yellow card) 45'; Barczi 46'; Ristevski (yellow card) 57'; Remili (yellow card) 64'	Report	Kukoč (yellow card) 21'; Lovrić (yellow card) 28'; Eppel 48'; Košút (yellow card) 83'	Stadium: Szusza Ferenc Stadion; Attendance: 600; Referee: Viktor Kassai

17 March 2018 23	Vasas	1–1	Diósgyőr	Budapest
17:00 CET (UTC+1)	Berecz 72'	Report	Nagy (yellow card) 47'; Ioannidis (yellow card) 53'; Kocsis (yellow card) 57'; Shestakov (yellow card) 59'; Brković 90+4'	Stadium: Szusza Ferenc Stadion; Attendance: 1,200; Referee: Tamás Bognár

31 March 2018 24	Balmazújváros	1–1	Vasas	Balmazújváros
17:00 CEST (UTC+2)	Andrić 29'; Maisuradze (yellow card) 31'	Report	James (yellow card) 41'; Vida 64'; Pavlov (yellow card) 70'	Stadium: Városi Sportpálya; Attendance: 1,094; Referee: Balázs Berke

7 April 2018 25	Vasas	1–2	Puskás Akadémia	Budapest
17:00 CEST (UTC+2)	Berecz (yellow card) 45'; Vaskó (yellow card) 80'; Mevoungou 90+4' (o.g.)	Report	Trajkovski (yellow card) 15'; Spandler 22'; Diallo (yellow card) 22'; Poór (yellow card) 68'; Mevoungou (yellow card) 75'; Radó 84'	Stadium: Szusza Ferenc Stadion; Attendance: 1,200; Referee: Zoltán Iványi

14 April 2018 26	Újpest	4–2	Vasas	Budapest
17:00 CEST (UTC+2)	Nwobodo 25'; Novothny 53', 76'; Diallo (yellow card) 61'; Pauljević 66'	Report	Ádám (yellow card) 23'; Egerszegi (yellow card) 28', (goal) 54'; James 33'; Hangya (yellow card) 44'; Vaskó (yellow card) 75'	Stadium: Szusza Ferenc Stadion; Attendance: 2,418; Referee: József Erdős

21 April 2018 27	Vasas	0–0	Mezőkövesd	Budapest
17:00 CEST (UTC+2)	Laczkó (yellow card) 83'; James (yellow card) 88'	Report	Tóth (yellow card) 33'	Stadium: Szusza Ferenc Stadion; Attendance: 1,500; Referee: Balázs Berke

28 April 2018 28	Debrecen	2–3	Vasas	Debrecen
17:00 CEST (UTC+2)	Barna (yellow card) 50'; Tőzsér (yellow card) 56'; Tabaković 81', 84'	Report	Ristevski (yellow card) 8'; Egerszegi 9', 24'; Vida (yellow card) 47'; Beneš 51'; Ádám (red card) 76'; Vogyicska (yellow card) 90'	Stadium: Nagyerdei Stadion; Attendance: 3,214; Referee: Viktor Kassai

5 May 2018 29	Vasas	0–1	Paks	Budapest
17:00 CEST (UTC+2)	James (yellow card) 11'; Beneš (yellow card) 90+4'; Hangya (yellow card) 90+4'	Report	Á. Simon (yellow card) 33'; Hahn 76'; Lenzsér (yellow card) 81'; Haraszti (yellow card) 84'	Stadium: Szusza Ferenc Stadion; Attendance: 1,000; Referee: István Vad

12 May 2018 30	Ferencváros	1–1	Vasas	Budapest
19:30 CEST (UTC+2)	Lovrencsics (yellow card) 33'; Blažič 89'; Böde (yellow card) 90'; Holczer (yellow card) 90'; Leandro (yellow card) 90+3'	Report	Hangya (yellow card) 78'; Vida (yellow card) 90+3'; Egerszegi 90+4'; Laczkó (yellow card) 90+4'	Stadium: Groupama Arena; Attendance: 11,345; Referee: Sándor Andó-Szabó

19 May 2018 31	Vasas	0–3	Videoton	Budapest
17:00 CEST (UTC+2)	James (yellow card) 23'; Egerszegi (yellow card) 24'; Ádám (yellow card) 32'; Murka (yellow card) 79'	Report	Šćepović 5'; Hadžić (yellow card) 23'; Kovács 57', (yellow card) 60'; Pátkai (yellow card) 77'; Tamás 90+2'	Stadium: Szusza Ferenc Stadion; Attendance: 1,079; Referee: Balázs Berke

27 May 2018 32	Vasas	1–0	Haladás	Budapest
17:00 CEST (UTC+2)	Egerszegi (yellow card) 28'; Barczi (yellow card) 50'; Hangya (yellow card) 84'; Vogyicska (yellow card) 88'; Pavlov 90+1'	Report	Bošnjak (yellow card) 19'; Rácz (yellow card) 44'; Ramos (yellow card) 49'; Kovács (yellow card) 53'; Halmosi (yellow card) 58'	Stadium: Szusza Ferenc Stadion; Attendance: 1,500; Referee: Zoltán Iványi

2 June 2018 33	Budapest Honvéd	3–1	Vasas	Budapest
19:00 CEST (UTC+2)	Eppel (yellow card) 13', (goal) 54'; Lanzafame 66', (yellow card) 66'; Holender 77'	Report	Egerszegi (yellow card) 22'; Barczi (yellow card) 70'; Vida (yellow card) 73'; Vaskó (yellow card) 77'; Gaál 87'	Stadium: Bozsik József Stadion; Attendance: 3,783; Referee: Péter Solymosi

=== Magyar Kupa ===
20 September 2017 Round of 128	Nyíradony	0–2	Vasas	Nyíradony
15:00 CEST (UTC+2)		Report	Pavlov 63'; Berecz (yellow card) 89'; Kulcsár 90+2'	Stadium: Nyíradonyi Városi Sporttelep; Attendance: 300; Referee: Gábor Kátai

25 October 2017 Round of 64	Dunaújváros	2–1	Vasas	Dunaújváros
20:00 CEST (UTC+2)	T. Tóth 37'; Karacs (yellow card) 54'; Csendes (yellow card) 85'; Csehi 90'	Report	Vaskó (yellow card) 37'; Burmeister (yellow card) 41'; Hangya (yellow card) 54'; Vergos 62'	Stadium: Dunaújvárosi Stadion; Attendance: 600; Referee: Szabolcs Szilasi

=== UEFA Europa League ===
==== First qualifying round ====
29 June 2017 First Leg	Beitar Jerusalem (Israel)	4–3	(Hungary) Vasas	Petah Tikva, Israel
19:45 IDT (UTC+3)	Georginho 19'; Sabo (yellow card) 48', (goal) 90+2'; Benayoun 88'; Vered 90+1'	Report	Pavlov 36', 43'; Kulcsár 52', (yellow card) 59'; Sağlık (yellow card) 56'	Stadium: HaMoshava Stadium; Attendance: 100 (No-crowd match); Referee: Nenad Đokić (Serbia)

6 July 2017 Second Leg	Vasas (Hungary)	0–3 (3–7 agg.)	(Israel) Beitar Jerusalem	Budapest, Hungary
20:30 CEST (UTC+2)	Burmeister (yellow card) 17'; Vaskó (yellow card) 73'	Report	Ezra 10', 61'; Vered (yellow card) 31'; Heister (yellow card) 43'; Klaiman (yellow card) 50'; Mori (yellow card) 53'; Varenne 90+1'	Stadium: Szusza Ferenc stadion Attendance: 4,016; Referee: Fábio Veríssimo (Portugal)
Note: Beitar Jerusalem won 7-3 on aggregate.

== Statistics ==
=== Appearances and goals ===
No.	Pos	Nat	Player	Total		Nemzeti Bajnokság I		Magyar Kupa		UEFA Europa League	
No.	Pos	Nat	Player	Apps	Goals	Apps	Goals	Apps	Goals	Apps	Goals
1	GK	(Hungary) HUN	Gergely Nagy	15	0	12	0	1	0	2	0
3	DF	(Canada) CAN	Manjrekar James	31	2	29	2	2	0	0	0
4	DF	(North Macedonia) MKD	Kire Ristevski	27	1	25	1	0	0	2	0
6	MF	(Hungary) HUN	Donát Szivacski	22	1	20	1	0	0	2	0
7	MF	(Hungary) HUN	Szilveszter Hangya	31	1	28	1	1	0	2	0
8	FW	(Hungary) HUN	Martin Ádám	30	2	27	2	1	0	2	0
9	FW	(Hungary) HUN	Norbert Csiki	1	0	1	0	0	0	0	0
10	FW	(Hungary) HUN	Mohamed Remili	32	5	28	5	2	0	2	0
13	MF	(Hungary) HUN	Zsombor Berecz	26	3	24	3	2	0	0	0
14	FW	(Hungary) HUN	Bálint Gaál	23	6	22	6	1	0	0	0
17	FW	(Ukraine) UKR	Yevhen Pavlov	29	5	26	2	1	1	2	2
19	DF	(Germany) GER	Felix Burmeister	32	4	28	4	2	0	2	0
20	MF	(Hungary) HUN	Márk Kleisz	7	0	4	0	1	0	2	0
23	MF	(Hungary) HUN	Máté Vida	33	1	30	1	1	0	2	0
27	FW	(Hungary) HUN	Benedek Murka	13	0	11	0	0	0	2	0
28	DF	(Hungary) HUN	Tamás Vaskó	29	0	26	0	2	0	1	0
31	MF	(Hungary) HUN	Dávid Barczi	13	1	13	1	0	0	0	0
32	DF	(Czech Republic) CZE	Vít Beneš	26	1	24	1	2	0	0	0
40	FW	(Hungary) HUN	István Ferenczi	5	0	4	0	1	0	0	0
77	MF	(Hungary) HUN	Tamás Egerszegi	14	4	14	4	0	0	0	0
86	FW	(Hungary) HUN	Zsolt Laczkó	4	0	4	0	0	0	0	0
87	GK	(Slovakia) SVK	Ľuboš Kamenár	22	0	22	0	0	0	0	0
90	GK	(Hungary) HUN	Dániel Póser	1	0	0	0	1	0	0	0
98	MF	(Hungary) HUN	Bálint Vogyicska	21	0	20	0	1	0	0	0
Players loaned out (for spring):
9	MF	(Hungary) HUN	Botond Király	3	0	1	0	1	0	1	0
Players left the club (from summer):
66	FW	(Turkey) TUR	Mahir Sağlık	1	0	0	0	0	0	1	0
89	DF	(Hungary) HUN	András Debreceni	0	0	0	0	0	0	0	0
Players left the club (from winter):
12	FW	(Greece) GRE	Nikos Vergos	6	1	4	0	2	1	0	0
15	DF	(Hungary) HUN	Máté Czingráber	0	0	0	0	0	0	0	0
22	DF	(Czech Republic) CZE	Jan Šimůnek	2	0	2	0	0	0	0	0
70	FW	(Hungary) HUN	Tamás Kulcsár	21	5	17	3	2	1	2	1

=== Goalscorers ===
Includes all competitive matches. The list is sorted by shirt number when total goals are equal.

Rank	No.	Nat.	Name	Nemzeti Bajnokság I	Magyar Kupa	UEFA Europa League	Total
1	14	(Hungary)	Bálint Gaál	6	0	0	6
2	10	(Hungary)	Mohamed Remili	5	0	0	5
2	17	(Ukraine)	Yevhen Pavlov	2	1	2	5
2	70	(Hungary)	Tamás Kulcsár	3	1	1	5
5	19	(Germany)	Felix Burmeister	4	0	0	4
5	77	(Hungary)	Tamás Egerszegi	4	0	0	4
7	13	(Hungary)	Zsombor Berecz	3	0	0	3
8	3	(Canada)	Manjrekar James	2	0	0	2
8	8	(Hungary)	Martin Ádám	2	0	0	2
10	4	(North Macedonia)	Kire Ristevski	1	0	0	1
10	6	(Hungary)	Donát Szivacski	1	0	0	1
10	7	(Hungary)	Szilveszter Hangya	1	0	0	1
10	12	(Greece)	Nikos Vergos	0	1	0	1
10	23	(Hungary)	Máté Vida	1	0	0	1
10	31	(Hungary)	Dávid Barczi	1	0	0	1
10	32	(Czech Republic)	Vít Beneš	1	0	0	1
Own goals				1	0	0	1
Total				38	3	3	44

=== Hat-tricks ===
Player	Against	Result	Date	Competition	Round	Ref
(Hungary) Mohamed Remili	Budapest Honvéd	4–1 (A)	30 September 2017	Nemzeti Bajnokság I	11	

=== Disciplinary record ===
No.	Pos.	Nat.	Name	Nemzeti Bajnokság I		Magyar Kupa		UEFA Europa League		Total	
No.	Pos.	Nat.	Name	Yellow card	Red card	Yellow card	Red card	Yellow card	Red card	Yellow card	Red card
3	DF	(Canada)	Manjrekar James	8	1					8	1
7	MF	(Hungary)	Szilveszter Hangya	8		1				9	
8	FW	(Hungary)	Martin Ádám	7	1					7	1
28	DF	(Hungary)	Tamás Vaskó	6		1		1		8	
19	DF	(Germany)	Felix Burmeister	5		1		1		7	
4	DF	(North Macedonia)	Kire Ristevski	6						6	
13	MF	(Hungary)	Zsombor Berecz	5		1				6	
23	MF	(Hungary)	Máté Vida	6						6	
6	MF	(Hungary)	Donát Szivacski	4	1					4	1
70	FW	(Hungary)	Tamás Kulcsár	4				1		5	
10	FW	(Hungary)	Mohamed Remili	4						4	
77	MF	(Hungary)	Tamás Egerszegi	4						4	
31	MF	(Hungary)	Dávid Barczi	2	1					2	1
98	MF	(Hungary)	Bálint Vogyicska	3						3	
14	FW	(Hungary)	Bálint Gaál	2						2	
17	FW	(Ukraine)	Yevhen Pavlov	2						2	
27	FW	(Hungary)	Benedek Murka	2						2	
86	FW	(Hungary)	Zsolt Laczkó	2						2	
87	GK	(Slovakia)	Ľuboš Kamenár	2						2	
20	MF	(Hungary)	Márk Kleisz	1						1	
32	DF	(Czech Republic)	Vít Beneš	1						1	
66	FW	(Turkey)	Mahir Sağlık					1		1	
Totals				84	4	4	0	4	0	92	4

=== Clean sheets ===
Rank	Nat.	Name	Nemzeti Bajnokság I	Magyar Kupa	UEFA Europa League	Total
1	(Slovakia)	Ľuboš Kamenár	4	0	0	4
2	(Hungary)	Gergely Nagy	2	0	0	2
3	(Hungary)	Dániel Póser	0	1	0	1
Total			6	1	0	7
