= 2017 Magyar Kupa final =

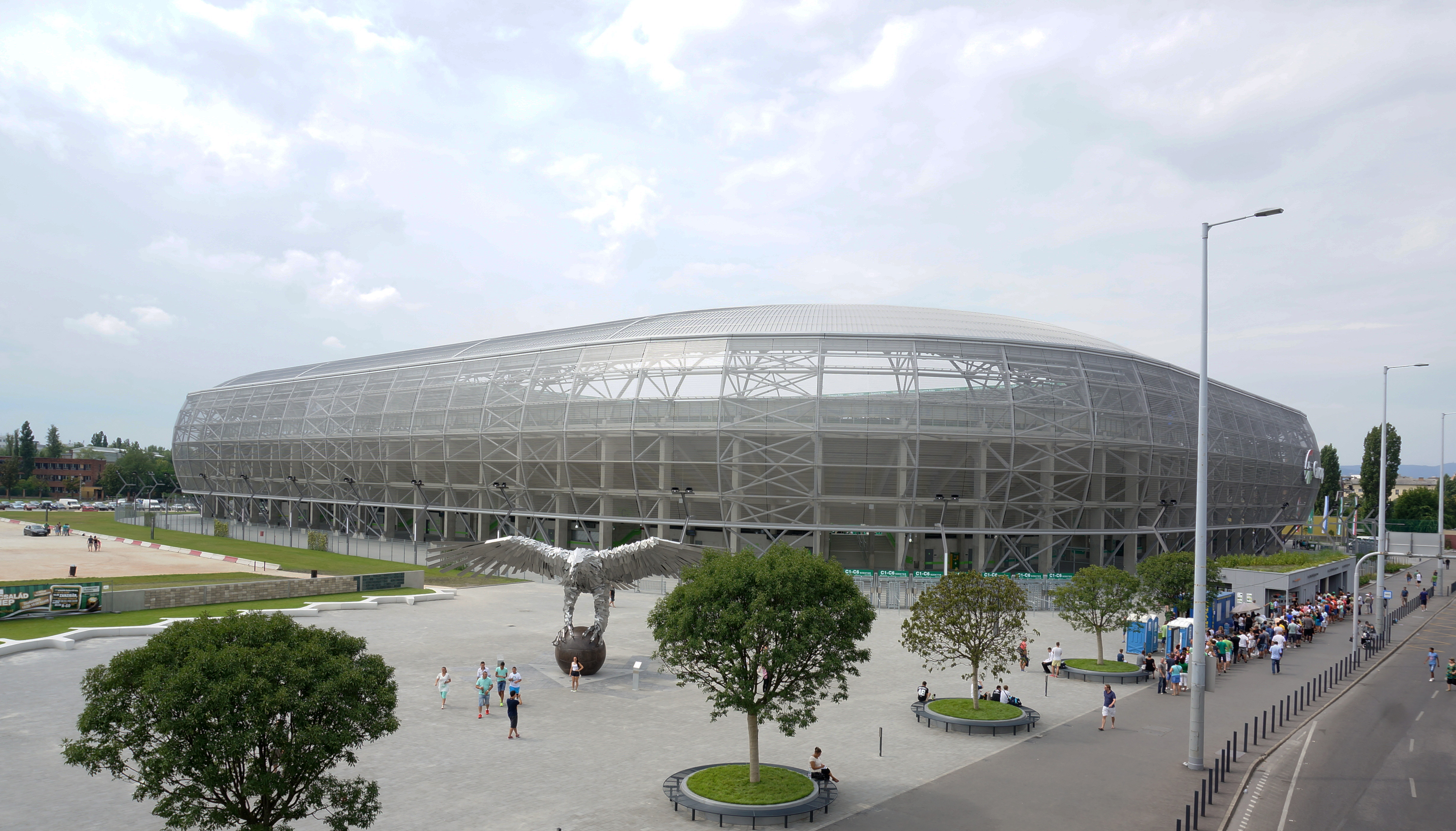
- Groupama Aréna hosted the final
- Event: 2016–17 Magyar Kupa
Vasas SC	Ferencváros
1	1
- Ferencváros won 5–4 on penalties
- Date: 31 May 2017
- Venue: Groupama Aréna, Budapest
- Referee: Péter Solymosi
- Attendance: 14,970

The 2017 Magyar Kupa final was the final match of the 2016–17 Magyar Kupa, played between Vasas SC and Ferencváros on 31 May 2017 at the Groupama Aréna in Budapest, Hungary.

On 29 May 2017, Péter Solymosi was appointed as the referee of the 2017 Magyar Kupa Final.

In the 80th minute Gergő Lovrencsics, Hungary international, suffered a horrible injury when he jumped up to head the ball against Vasas SC player Benedek Murka. Lovrencsics collapsed and lost his consciousness for a minute. He was transferred to Uzsoki utcai Kórház, located in Zugló, immediately after the accident.

== Teams ==
Team	Previous finals appearances (bold indicates winners)
Vasas	7 (**1955**, **1973**, 1980, **1981**, **1986**, 2000, 2006)
Ferencváros	31 (1912, **1913**, **1922**, **1927**, **1928**, 1931, 1932, **1933**, **1935**, **1942**, **1943**, **1944**, **1958**, 1966, **1972**, **1974**, **1976**, 1977, **1978**, 1979, 1986, 1989, **1991**, **1993**, **1994**, **1995**, **2003**, **2004**, 2005, **2015**, **2016**)

== Route to the final ==
Vasas			Round	Ferencváros
Opponent	Result	Legs		Opponent	Result	Legs
Testvériség SE (county I)	4–0	4–0 away	Round of 128	BKV Előre SC (NBIII)	0–1	0–1 away
Csornai SE (NBIII)	7–2	7–2 away	Round of 64	Koroncó KSSZE (county II)	9–0	9–0 away
Győri ETO FC (NBIII)	3–2	3–2 away	Round of 32	Puskás Akadémia FC (NBII)	2–1 (a.e.t.)	2–1 away
Dorogi FC (NBII)	6–1	2–1 away; 4–0 home	Round of 16	Budapest Honvéd FC (NBI)	4–1	2–1 home; 2–0 away;
Újpest FC (NBI)	2–2	2–1 away; 0–1 home	Quarterfinals	Diósgyőri VTK (NBI)	2–1	2–1 home; 0–0 away
Mezőkövesdi SE (NBI)	7–0	2–0 home; 5–0 away	Semifinals	Budafoki LC (NBIII)	12–2	8–0 home; 4–2 away

== Match ==
31 May 2017
(CEST) 20:30

Vasas	1–1 (a.e.t.)	Ferencváros
Kulcsár 47'	Report	26' Varga
Penalties
Remili (penalty scored); Berecz (penalty scored); Ristevski (penalty missed); Vida (penalty scored); Gaál (penalty scored)	4–5	(penalty scored) Varga; (penalty scored) Leandro; (penalty scored) Radó; (penalty scored) Sternberg; (penalty scored) Cukic

Groupama Aréna, Budapest (Ferencváros)
Attendance: 14,970
Referee: Péter Solymosi

**Vasas**	**Ferencváros**

VASAS:
GK	1	(Hungary) Gergely Nagy
RB	19	(Germany) Felix Burmeister	(yellow card) 24'	(substituted off) 46'
B	28	(Hungary) Tamás Vaskó
B	4	(North Macedonia) Kire Ristevski
MF	20	(Hungary) Márk Kleisz
MF	23	(Hungary) Máté Vida
MF	13	(Hungary) Zsombor Berecz
DF	7	(Hungary) Szilveszter Hangya	(substituted off) 57'
F	66	(Turkey) Mahir Sağlık	(yellow card) 42'
F	70	(Hungary) Tamás Kulcsár	(substituted off) 96'
F	10	(Hungary) Mohamed Remili	(yellow card) 37'
Substitutes:
DF	21	(Hungary) Zsolt Korcsmár (substituted in) 46'
F	27	(Hungary) Benedek Murka (substituted in) 57'
F	14	(Hungary) Bálint Gaál (substituted in) 96'
MF	90	(Hungary) Dániel Póser
MF	3	(Canada) James Manjrekar
F	8	(Hungary) Ádám Martin
F	39	(Hungary) István Ferenczi
Manager:
(Germany) Michael Oenning

FERENCVÁROS:
GK	90	(Hungary) Dénes Dibusz
RB	66	(Austria) Emir Dilaver
B	27	(Poland) Michał Nalepa
B	16	(Hungary) Leandro de Almeida
F	8	(Hungary) Gergő Lovrencsics (substituted off) 90+5'
MF	20	(Hungary) Zoltán Gera (substituted off) 69'
MF	15	(Hungary) Tamás Hajnal (substituted off) 79'
MF	97	(Hungary) Roland Varga
F	6	(Hungary) László Kleinheisler
MF	40	(Niger) Amadou Moutari	(yellow card) 80'
F	10	(Hungary) András Radó
Substitutes:
GK	31	(Hungary) Ádám Holczer
DF	5	(Germany) Oliver Hüsing
MF	11	(Hungary) István Bognár
MF	17	(Hungary) Kornél Csernik (substituted in) 90+5'
MF	30	(Serbia) Vladan Cukic (substituted in) 69'	(yellow card) 97'
DF	37	(Germany) Janek Sternberg (substituted in) 79'
Manager:
(Germany) Thomas Doll
