= 2016–17 Magyar Kupa =

Tournament details
- Country: Hungary
- Dates: 3 August 2016 – 31 May 2017
- Teams: 111

Final positions
- Champions: Ferencváros (23rd title)
- Runners-up: Vasas

Tournament statistics
- Top goal scorer: (Turkey) Mahir Saglik (7 goals)
- All statistics correct as of 9 February 2017.

The 2016–17 Magyar Kupa (English: Hungarian Cup) was the 77th season of Hungary's annual knock-out cup football competition. The 2017 Magyar Kupa final was won by Ferencvárosi TC on penalties against Vasas SC on 31 May 2017.

== Round of 128 ==
Team 1	Score	Team 2
14 September 2016
BTE Felsőzsolca (county I)	0 – 4	Újpest FC (NBI)
Mórahalom VSE (NBIII)	1 – 7	Budapest Honvéd FC (NBI)
Egri FC (county I)	1 – 3	Diósgyőri VTK (NBI)
BKV Előre SC (NBIII)	0 – 1	Ferencvárosi TC (NBI)
Testvériség SE (county I)	0 – 4	Vasas SC (NBI)
Szekszárdi UFC (NBIII)	0 – 1	Paksi FC (NBI)
Zalakomár FC (county I)	0 – 7	Gyirmót FC Győr (NBI)
Oroszlány (county I)	0 – 4	MTK Budapest FC (NBI)
Rakamazi Spartacus SE (county I)	0 – 2	Mezőkövesdi SE(NBI)
Füzesgyarmati SK (county I)	0 – 2	Szombathelyi Haladás (NBI)
Ménfőcsanaki SE (county I)	1 – 1 (p. 4–3)	FC Ajka (NB III)
Pécsi MFC (NBIII)	0 – 4	Videoton FC (NBI)
Győri ETO FC (NBIII)	1 – 0	Debreceni VSC (NBI)
21 September 2016
Komlói Bányász SK (NBIII)	1 – 2	Csákvári TK (NB II)
Pétervására SE (county I)	1 – 6	Soroksár SC (NB II)
FC Tatabánya (NBIII)	0 – 3	Dorogi FC (NB II)
Inter CDF SE (county I)	1 – 2	Mosonmagyaróvári TE (NB II)
Erzsébeti SMTK (NBIII)	1 – 3	Vác FC (NB II)
Balatonlelle SE (county I)	0 – 2	Budaörsi SC (NB II)
Teveli MEDOSZ SE (county I)	0 – 9	Zalaegerszegi TE (NB II)
Kazincbarcikai SC (NBIII)	1 – 2	Soproni VSE (NB II)
Siklós FC (county I)	2 – 3	Szegedi EOL SC (NB II)
Baktalórántháza VSE (county I)	4 – 4 (p. 5–4)	Cigánd SE (NB II)
Csepel FC (NBIII)	0 – 1	Ceglédi VSE (NB II)
Hódmezővásárhelyi FC (NBIII)	2 – 0	Várda SE (NB II)
Monori SE (NBIII)	1 – 7	Szolnoki MÁV FC (NB II)
Veszprém FC (NBIII)	0 – 3	Kozármisleny SE (NB II)
Rákospalotai EAC (NBIII)	2 – 0	BFC Siófok (NB II)
Tatai AC (county I)	0 – 5	Puskás Akadémia FC (NB II)
43. sz Építők (county I)	0 – 6	Békéscsaba 1912 Előre (NB II)
Hévíz FC (NBIII)	0 – 1	Szeged 2011 (NB II)
Andráshida SC (NBIII)	0 – 3	Balmazújvárosi FC (NB II)
Iváncsa KSE (county I)	0 – 3	Nyíregyháza Spartacus FC (NB II)
Tállya KSE (NBIII)	4 – 0	III. Kerületi TUE (NBIII)
Mád FC (county I)	5 – 0	Edelényi FC (county I)
Marcali VFC (county I)	3 – 3 (p. 4–3)	Pénzügyőr SE (NBIII)
Ceredvölgye SE (county I)	2 – 5	Csornai SE (NBIII)
Várpalotai BSK (county I)	1 – 6	Bicskei TC (county I)
Balatonfüredi FC (county I)	0 – 3	Tiszakécske FC (county I)
Balkányi SE (county I)	1 – 2	Budafoki MTE (NBIII)
Olajmunkás SE (county I)	0 – 1	Dunaharaszti MTK (NBIII)
Taksony SE (county I)	0 – 6	Érdi VSE (NBIII)
Bácsalmási PVSE (county I)	3 – 1	Diósdi TC (NBIII)
Mór VSE (county I)	3 – 2	FC Dabas (NBIII)
Balassagyarmati VSE (county I)	2 – 1	Hajdúböszörményi TE (NB III)
Dabas–Gyón FC (NBIII)	0 – 3	Komárom VSE (NBIII)
Gyulai FC (NBIII)	1 – 1 (p. 6–5)	FC Tiszaújváros (NB III)
Tiszaszigeti SE (megye I)	4 – 1	Szászvári SE (megye I.)
Nyúl SC (megye I)	2 – 4	Rákosmenti KSK (NBIII)
Méhkeréki SE (NBIII)	0 – 2	Putnok VSE (NBIII)
Koroncó KSSZE (county II)	1 – 0	Bonyhád VLC (megye I)
Makó FC (county I)	2 – 2 (p. 4–2)	Sárvári FC (NBIII)
Törökszentmiklósi FC (county I)	0 – 1	FC Hatvan (NBIII)
Berettyóújfalui SE (county I)	0 – 4	Salgótarjáni BTC (NBIII)
Szentantalfa NVSE (county II)	1 – 1 (p. 9–10)	Király SZE (megye I)
Tura VSK (county I)	2 – 1	Nyírbátori FC (NBIII)
Nagykáta SE (county I)	1 – 2	Szigetszentmiklósi TK (NBIII)
Kecskeméti LC (county I)	7 – 0	Babócsa SE (county I)
Berkenye SE (county I)	2 – 3	Jászberényi FC (NBIII)
Kondorosi TE (county I)	0 – 4	Kaposvári Rákóczi FC (NBIII)
Körmendi FC (county I)	3 – 2	Szajol KLK (county I)
Sárrétudvari KSE (county I)	0 – 2	Dunaújváros PASE (NBIII)
Nagykanizsa FC (county I)	1 – 1 (p. 3–4)	Celldömölki VSE (county I)
Sellye VSK (county I)	2 – 5	Szentlőrinc SE (NBIII)

== Round of 64 ==
Team 1	Score	Team 2
25 October 2016
Ménfőcsanaki SE (county I)	0 – 1‡	Soroksár SC (NBII)
Dunaújváros PASE (NBIII)	2 – 3	Szolnoki MÁV FC (NBII)
Csákvári TK (NBII)	1 – 1 (p.6–5)	Békéscsaba 1912 Előre (NBII)
26 October 2016
Csornai SE (NBIII)	2 – 7	Vasas SC (NBI)
Balassagyarmati VSE (county I)	1 – 3	MTK Budapest FC (NBI)
Mosonmagyaróvári TE (NBII)	2 – 3	Gyirmót FC Győr (NBI)
Salgótarjáni BTC (NBIII)	0 – 1	Diósgyőri VTK (NBI)
Koroncó KSSZE (county II)	0 – 9	Ferencvárosi TC (NBI)
Makó FC (county I)	1 – 6	Videoton FC (NBI)
Rákosmenti KSK (NBIII)	1 – 6	Budapest Honvéd FC (NBI)
Mád FC (county I)	0 – 4	Újpest FC (NBI)
Marcali VFC (county I)	0 – 13	Mezőkövesd-Zsóry SE (NBI)
Balmazújvárosi FC (NBII)	3 – 2	Paksi FC (NBI)
Vác FC (NBII)	0 – 3	Szombathelyi Haladás (NBI)
Mór Városi SE (county I)	0 – 3	Puskás Akadémia FC (NBII)
Kozármisleny SE (NBII)	3 – 2	Nyíregyháza Spartacus FC (NBII)
Hódmezővásárhelyi FC (NBIII)	0 – 4	Dorogi FC (NBII)
Tállya KSE (NBIII)	1 – 3	Ceglédi VSE (NBII)
Bácsalmási PVSE (county I)	1 – 2	Celldömölki VSE (county I)
Tura VSK (county I)	1 – 2	Putnok FC (NBIII)
Kecskeméti LC (county I)	5 – 0	Dunaharaszti MTK (NBIII)
Szegedi EOL SC (NB II)	1 – 3	Soproni VSE (NBII)
Körmendi FC (county I)	2 – 5	Szentlőrinc SE (NB III)
FC Hatvan (NBIII)	3 – 2	Jászberényi FC (NBIII)
Budafoki MTE (NB III)	2 – 1	Szeged 2011 (NBII)
Bicskei TC (county I)	2 – 1	Szigetszentmiklósi TK (NBIII)
Király SZE (county I)	0 – 4	Rákospalotai EAC (NBIII)
Tiszaszigeti SE (county I)	0 – 1	Kaposvári Rákóczi FC (NBIII)
Baktalórántháza VSE (county I)	1 – 1 (p.4–3)	Gyulai FC (NBIII)
Érdi VSE (NBIII)	3 – 3 (p.4–1)	Budaörsi SC (NB II)
Tiszakécske FC (county I)	0 – 1	Zalaegerszegi TE (NBII)
Győri ETO FC (NBIII)	7 – 1	Komárom VSE (NBIII)

== Round of 32 ==
The third round of the 2016–17 Magyar Kupa was held on 29 and 30 November 2016.

29 November 2016	Rákospalota	1–3	Mezőkövesd	Budapest, Hungary
12:30 CET		[ Report]

29 November 2016	Győr	2–3	Vasas	Győr, Hungary
12:30 CET		[ Report]		Stadium: ETO Park

30 November 2016	Dorog	1–0	MTK Budapest	Dorog, Hungary
12:30 CET		[ Report]

30 November 2016	Budafoki MTE	2–1	Videoton	Budapest, Hungary
12:30 CET		[ Report]

30 November 2016	Putnok	1–4	Diósgyőr	Putnok, Hungary
12:30 CET		[ Report]

30 November 2016	Ménfőcsanak	0–5	Budapest Honvéd	Ménfőcsanak, Hungary
12:30 CET		[ Report]

30 November 2016	Érd	3–3 (p. 5–3)	Szombathely	Érd, Hungary
12:30 CET		Report

30 November 2016	Baktalórántháza	1–2	Szolnok	Baktalórántháza, Hungary
12:30 CET		[ Report]

30 November 2016	Celldömölk	0–1	Szentlőrinc	Celldömölk, Hungary
12:30 CET		[ Report]

30 November 2016	Hatvan	1–2	Csákvár	Hatvan, Hungary
12:30 CET		[ Report]

30 November 2016	Bicske	0–2	Cegléd	Bicske, Hungary
12:30 CET		[ Report]

30 November 2016	Kaposvár	0–1	Sopron	Kaposvár, Hungary
12:30 CET		[ Report]

30 November 2016	Balmazújváros	1–2	Zalaegerszeg	Balmazújváros, Hungary
12:30 CET		[ Report]

30 November 2016	Kecskemét	0–2	Gyirmót	Kecskemét, Hungary
12:30 CET		[ Report]

30 November 2016	Kozármisleny	1–1 (p. 2–4)	Újpest	Kozármisleny, Hungary
12:30 CET		Report

30 November 2016	Puskás Akadémia	1–2 (aet)	Ferencváros	Felcsút, Hungary
12:30 CET		[ Report]		Stadium: Pancho Arena

== Round of 16 ==
The 8th finals were competed between 11 February 2017 and 1 March 2017.

=== 1st leg ===
11 February 2017	Zalaegerszeg (NBII)	1–4	Újpest (NBI)	Zalaegerszeg, Hungary
12:30 CET	Bobál 88'	Report	10' Mohl; 18' Bardhi; 69' Balogh; 71' Diarra	Stadium: ZTE Arena

11 February 2017	Dorog (NBII)	1–2	Vasas (NBI)	Dorog, Hungary
12:30 CET	Mészáros 30'	Report	4' Saglik; 52'Murka

11 February 2017	Érd (NBIII)	2–1	Budafok (NBIII)	Érd, Hungary
12:30 CET	Melczer 29' 77'	Report	21' Oláh

11 February 2017	Mezőkövesd (NBI)	0–0	Gyirmót (NBI)	Mezőkövesd, Hungary
12:30 CET		Report		Stadium: Mezőkövesdi Városi Stadion

11 February 2017	Csákvár (NBII)	2–1	Sopron (NBII)	Csákvár, Hungary
12:30 CET	Oldal 1'; Kiprich 23'	Report	Eszlatyi 38'

11 February 2017	Ferencváros (NBI)	2–1	Budapest Honvéd (NBI)	Budapest, Hungary
12:30 CET	Amadou 33'; Leandro 52'	Report	88' Lanzafame	Stadium: Groupama Aréna; Attendance: 6,817

14 February 2017	Szentlőrinc (NBIII)	0–2	Szolnok (NBII)	Szentlőrinc, Hungary
14:00 CET		Report	63' Olasz; 78' Tóth	Stadium: Szentlőrinci sportpálya

14 February 2017	Cegléd (NBIII)	0–1	Diósgyőr (NBI)	Albertirsa, Hungary
12:30 CET		Report	26' Ugrai	Stadium: Ecsedi László sportcentrum

=== 2nd leg ===
1 March 2017	Újpest (NBI)	2–0 (6–1 agg.)	Zalaegerszeg (NBII)	Budapest, Hungary
14:30 CET		Report		Stadium: Szusza Ferenc Stadion

28 February 2017	Vasas (NBI)	4–0 (6–1 agg.)	Dorog (NBII)	Budapest, Hungary
14:30 CET	Berecz 10'; Kleisz 42'; Sağlık 48', 58' (pen.)	Report		Stadium: Szusza Ferenc Stadion

1 March 2017	Budafok (NBIII)	2–0 (3–2 agg.)	Érd (NBIII)	Budapest, Hungary
14:30 CET		Report

1 March 2017	Gyirmót (NBI)	1–1 (1–1 (a) agg.)	Mezőkövesd (NBI)	Győr, Hungary
14:30 CET		Report		Stadium: Ménfői úti Stadion

1 March 2017	Sopron (NBII)	2–0 (3–2 agg.)	Csákvár (NBII)	Sopron, Hungary
18:00 CET		Report

1 March 2017	Budapest Honvéd (NBI)	0–2 (1–4 agg.)	Ferencváros (NBI)	Budapest, Hungary
20:30 CET		Report		Stadium: Bozsik József Stadion

1 March 2017	Szolnok (NBII)	3–0 (5–0 agg.)	Szentlőrinc (NBII)	Szolnok, Hungary
14:30 CET		Report		Stadium: Tiszaligeti Stadion

1 March 2017	Diósgyőr (NBI)	2–0 (3–0 agg.)	Cegléd (NBII)	Debrecen, Hungary
18:00 CET		Report		Stadium: Nagyerdei Stadion

== Quarter-finals ==
=== 1st leg ===
28 March 2017	Mezőkövesd (NBI)	3–1	Szolnok (NBII)	Mezőkövesd, Hungary
18:30 CET	Kenderes 2' (o.g.); Vági 25'; Veselinović 30'	Report	45+1' Tóth	Stadium: Városi Stadion; Referee: Ádám Németh (Hungary)

29 March 2017	Budafok (NBIII)	1–2	Sopron (NBII)	Budapest, Hungary
16:00 CET	Pölöskei 90+3'	Report	29' Kapacina; 78' Erdélyi	Stadium: Promontor utcai Stadion; Referee: (Hungary)

29 March 2017	Ferencváros (NBI)	2–1	Diósgyőr (NBI)	Budapest, Hungary
19:00 CET	Böde 65'; Moutari 90+2'	Report	13' Ugrai	Stadium: Groupama Arena; Referee: (Hungary)

29 March 2017	Újpest (NBI)	1–2	Vasas (NBI)	Budapest, Hungary
20:00 CET	Lázok 5'	Report	62' James; 86' Remili	Stadium: Szusza Ferenc Stadion; Referee: (Hungary)

=== 2nd leg ===
5 April 2017	Szolnok (NBII)	3–4	Mezőkövesd (NBI)	Szolnok, Hungary
17:00 CET	Hajba 5'; Pantovic 47'; Berdó 73'	Report	26' Diallo; 71' Baracskai; 77' Strestik; 84' Molnár	Stadium: Tiszaligeti Stadion; Referee: (Hungary)

5 April 2017	Sopron (NBII)	0–2	Budafok (NBIII)	Sopron, Hungary
17:00 CET		Report	8' Kovács; 45' Csizmadia	Stadium: Káposztás utcai Stadion; Referee: (Hungary)

4 April 2017	Diósgyőr (NBI)	0–0	Ferencváros (NBI)	Mezőkövesd, Hungary
19:45 CET		Report		Stadium: Városi Stadion; Referee: (Hungary)

5 April 2017	Vasas (NBI)	0–1	Újpest (NBI)	Budapest, Hungary
20:30 CET		Report	45+2' Andrić	Stadium: Hidegkuti Nándor Stadion; Referee: (Hungary)

== Semi-finals ==
The draw of the semi-finals was held on 7 April 2017.

=== 1st leg ===
26 April 2017	Vasas (NBI)	2–0	Mezőkövesd (NBI)	Budapest, Hungary
16:00 CET	Berecz 45+1' (p.); Kulcsár 49'	Report		Stadium: Szusza Ferenc Stadion; Attendance: Referee: (Solymosi Hungary)

26 April 2017	Ferencváros (NBI)	8–0	Budafok (NBIII)	Budapest, Hungary
18:00 CET	Bognár 13' 40'; Böde 26' 55'; Varga 38'; Moutari 43'; Djuricin 56' 58'	Report		Stadium: Groupama Arena; Attendance: 4,055; Referee: (Karakó Hungary)

=== 2nd leg ===
17 May 2017	Mezőkövesd (NBI)	0–5	Vasas (NBI)	Mezőkövesd, Hungary
20:00 CET		Report	4' Berecz; 28' Kulcsár; 68' Sağlık; 71' Ádám; 86' Hangya	Stadium: Városi Stadion; Referee: (Hungary)

17 May 2017	Budafok (NBIII)	2–4	Ferencváros (NBI)	Budapest, Hungary
15:00 CET	Csizmadia 25'; Kovács 49'	Report	Kundrák 21' 33'; Hajnal 30'; Moutari 71'	Stadium: Promontor utcai Stadion; Referee: (Hungary)

== Final ==
31 May 2017
20:30 CEST

Vasas SC (I)	1–1 (a.e.t.)	Ferencváros (I)
Kulcsár 47'	Report	26' Varga
Penalties
Remili (penalty scored); Berecz (penalty scored); Ristevski (penalty missed); Vida (penalty scored); Gaál (penalty scored)	4–5	(penalty scored) Varga; (penalty scored) Leandro; (penalty scored) Radó; (penalty scored) Sternberg; (penalty scored) Cukic

Groupama Aréna, Budapest (Ferencváros)
Attendance: 14,970
Referee: Péter Solymosi

== See also ==
- 2017 Magyar Kupa final
- 2016–17 Nemzeti Bajnokság I
- 2016–17 Nemzeti Bajnokság II
- 2016–17 Nemzeti Bajnokság III
