= Benedek Murka =

Hungarian footballer (born 1997)

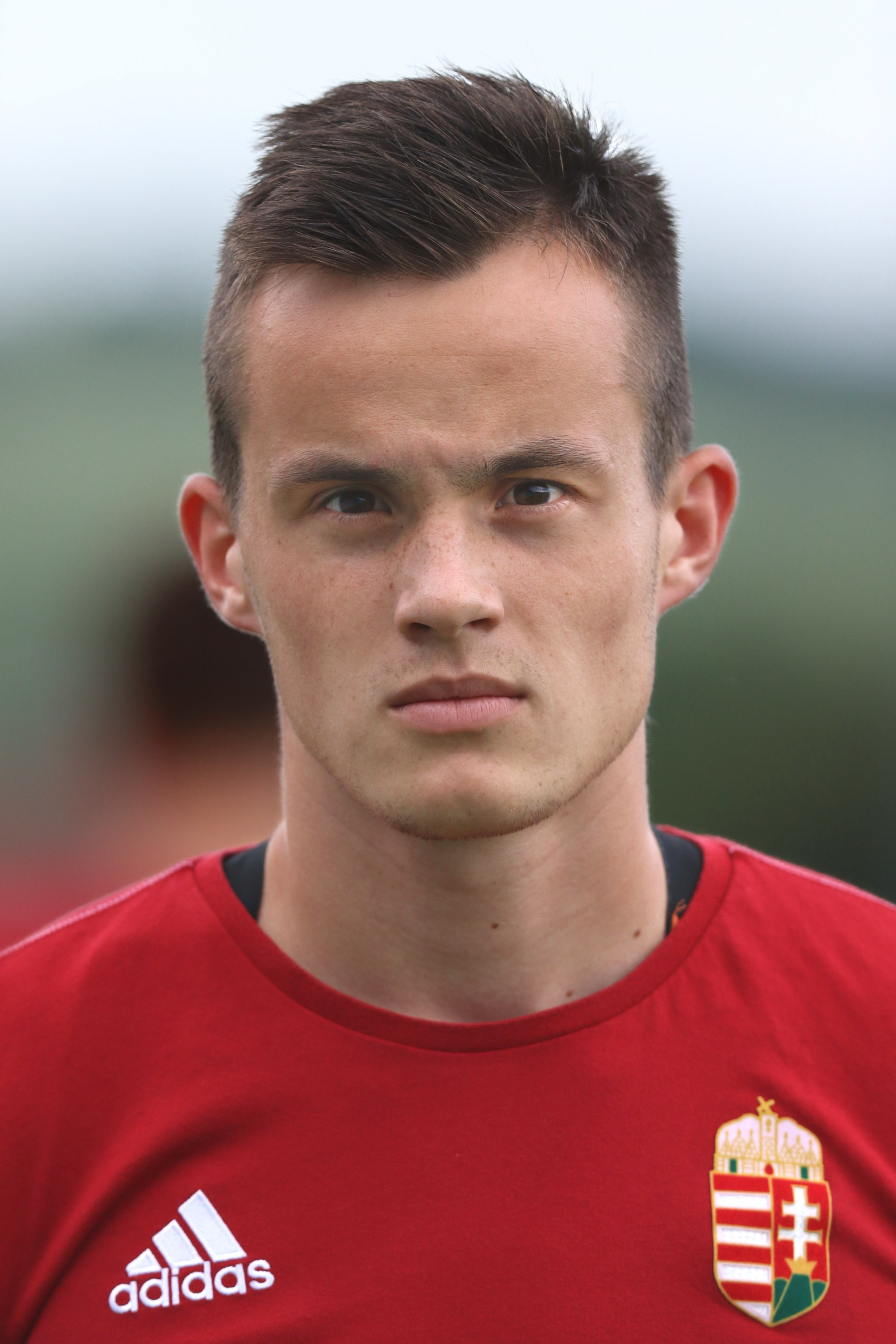

Personal information
- Date of birth: 10 September 1997 (age 29)
- Place of birth: Budapest, Hungary
- Height: 1.79 m (5 ft 10 in)
- Position: Forward

Team information
- Current team: Videoton Fehérvár
- Number: 27

Youth career
- 2006–2011: Dunakeszi
- 2011–2015: Újpest

Senior career*
Years	Team	Apps	(Gls)
2015–2022	Vasas	67	(2)
2015–2016	→ Siófok (loan)	14	(1)
2021	→ Csákvár (loan)	11	(0)
2021–2022	→ Ajka (loan)	15	(0)
2022–2025	Csákvár	82	(7)
2025–	Videoton Fehérvár	23	(2)

International career^{‡}
2014–2015	Hungary U18	10	(1)
2015	Hungary U19	7	(1)
2017–2018	Hungary U21	3	(0)
- * Club domestic league appearances and goals as of 31 May 2026 ‡ National team caps and goals as of 12:10, 26 September 2024 (UTC)

Benedek Murka (born 10 September 1997) is a Hungarian professional footballer who plays as a forward for Nemzeti Bajnokság II club Videoton Fehérvár. He represented Hungary at youth level.

== Career ==
In February 2015, Murka signed a 2 1/2 year contract with Nemzeti Bajnokság II side Vasas. In the 2015–16 season, he went back to loan to the second tier with Siófok after the promotion of Vasas.

On 24 July 2021, after the loan spell at Csákvár, Murka loaned out to also second division team Ajka.

== Career statistics ==
=== Club ===
As of match played 14 September 2024

Appearances and goals by club, season and competition
Club	Season	League			National cup (Note: Includes Magyar Kupa)		Europe		Total	
Club	Season	Division	Apps	Goals	Apps	Goals	Apps	Goals	Apps	Goals
Vasas	2014–15	Nemzeti Bajnokság II	4	0	—		—		4	0
Vasas	2015–16	Nemzeti Bajnokság I	2	0	—		—		2	0
Vasas	Total		6	0	—		—		6	0
Siófok (loan)	2015–16	Nemzeti Bajnokság II	14	1	—		—		14	1
Vasas	2016–17	Nemzeti Bajnokság I	20	2	5	1	—		25	3
Vasas	2017–18	Nemzeti Bajnokság I	11	0	—		2 (Note: Appearances in UEFA Europa League)	0	13	0
Vasas	2018–19	Nemzeti Bajnokság II	29	0	2	0	—		31	0
Vasas	2020–21	Nemzeti Bajnokság II	1	0	2	0	—		3	0
Vasas	Total		61	2	9	1	2	0	72	3
Csákvár (loan)	2020–21	Nemzeti Bajnokság II	11	0	—		—		11	0
Ajka (loan)	2021–22	Nemzeti Bajnokság II	15	0	1	0	—		16	0
Csákvár	2022–23	Nemzeti Bajnokság II	29	3	0	0	—		29	3
Csákvár	2023–24	Nemzeti Bajnokság II	33	3	0	0	—		33	3
Csákvár	2024–25	Nemzeti Bajnokság II	6	0	0	0	—		6	0
Csákvár	Total		68	6	0	0	—		68	6
Career total			175	9	10	1	2	0	187	10

== Honours ==
Vasas

- Nemzeti Bajnokság II: 2014–15
