= Vít Beneš =

Czech footballer (born 1988)

Personal information
- Full name: Vít Beneš
- Date of birth: 12 August 1988 (age 38)
- Place of birth: Ústí nad Labem, Czechoslovakia
- Height: 1.91 m (6 ft 3 in)
- Position: Centre back

Team information
- Current team: Vysočina Jihlava
- Number: 12

Youth career
- Ravel Usti
- Sparta Prague
- Kladno

Senior career*
Years	Team	Apps	(Gls)
2006–2010	Kladno	60	(1)
2010–2017	Jablonec	141	(14)
2017–2019	Vasas	24	(1)
2018	→ Haladás (loan)	12	(0)
2019–2024	Sigma Olomouc	134	(8)
2024	→→ Sigma Olomouc B	7	(0)
2024–	Vysočina Jihlava	45	(3)

International career
2010–2011	Czech Republic U21	1	(0)
- * Club domestic league appearances and goals as of 28 May 2026

Vít Beneš (born 12 August 1988) is a Czech footballer who currently plays for Vysočina Jihlava in the Czech National Football League.

== Career ==
In June 2013, he was chased by Sparta Prague but the Jablonec owner decided not to sell him because of the European campaign of the club. On 6 September 2024, Beneš signed a contract with Vysočina Jihlava.

== Honours ==
=== Jablonec ===
- Czech Cup: 2012–13
- Czech Supercup: 2013
