= 2014–15 Nemzeti Bajnokság II =

Nemzeti Bajnokság II
- Season: 2014–15
- Champions: Vasas Budapest; Békéscsaba
- Relegated: Siófok; Cegléd; Kaposvár
- Top goalscorer: Mohamed Remili (19 goals)

The 2014–2015 Nemzeti Bajnokság II was the 116th season of the Nemzeti Bajnokság II, the second tier of the Hungarian football league.

The 2014–15 Nemzeti Bajnokság II football season was a single sixteen-team league, unlike previous years, which had two geographically-based sixteen-team groups. Kaposvár and Mezőkövesd were relegated from the 2013–14 Nemzeti Bajnokság I.

== Teams ==
Location of teams in 2013–14 Nemzeti Bajnokság II

=== Stadium and locations ===
Following is the list of clubs competing in 2014–15 Nemzeti Bajnokság II, with their location, stadium and stadium capacity.

Team	Location	Stadium	Capacity
FC Ajka	Ajka	Ajkai Városi Szabadidő- és Sportcentrum	5,000
Balmazújvárosi FC	Balmazújváros	Batthyány utcai Sportpálya	2,300
Békéscsaba 1912 Előre SE	Békéscsaba	Stadion Kórház utcai	10,432
Ceglédi VSE	Cegléd	Stadion Malomtó széli	4,000
Csákvári TK	Csákvár	Tersztyánszky Ödön Sportközpont	2,020
Gyirmót SE	Győr	Ménfői út	2,700
Kaposvári Rákóczi FC	Kaposvár	Stadion Kaposvár Rákóczi	7,000
Mezőkövesd-Zsóry SE	Mezőkövesd	Mezőkövesdi Városi Stadion	2,571
BFC Siófok	Siófok	Révész Street Stadium	6,500
Soproni VSE	Sopron	Stadion Városi	5,300
Soroksár SC	Budapest	Szamosi Mihály Sporttelep	5,000
Szeged 2011	Gyula	Grosics Akadémia Centerpálya	1,500
Szigetszentmiklósi TK	Szigetszentmiklós	Stadium Sport Street	1,200
Szolnoki MÁV	Szolnok	Tiszaligeti Stadion	4,000
Vasas SC	Budapest	Stadion Rudolf Illovszky	9,000
Zalaegerszegi TE	Zalaegerszeg	ZTE Arena	9,300

=== Personnel and kits ===
Following is the list of clubs competing in 2013–14 Nemzeti Bajnokság II, with their manager, captain, kit manufacturer and shirt sponsor.

Team	Manager	Captain	Kit manufacturer	Shirt sponsor
Ajka	(Hungary) István Klement	Gergő Pákai	Legea	Polus Coop Zrt.
Balmazújváros	(Hungary) János Szabó	Pál Szalma	Nike	Dantnova Kft.
Békéscsaba	(Serbia) Zoran Spisljak	Zsolt Balog	saller	Békés Drén
Cegléd	(Hungary) István Szabó	Zsolt Koncz	Joma	
Csákvár	(Hungary) György Bognár	Attila Domján	Adidas	Aqvital
Gyirmót	(Hungary) Tibor Sisa	Zoltán Balog	Jako	Alcufer
Kaposvár	(Hungary) Gábor Márton	István Bank	Toti Sport	Ippon
Mezőkövesd	(Hungary) László Tóth	Péter Takács	Legea	Zsóry
Siófok	(Hungary) Károly Horváth	Norbert Tajti	Puma	AVE
Sopron	(Hungary) Attila Supka	András Horváth	Nike	GYSEV
Soroksár	(Hungary) Attila Varga	Péter Pandur	Jako	Banetti
Szeged	(Hungary) Elek Nyilas	Péter Máté	Puma	Pick
Szigetszentmiklós	(Hungary) Attila Vágó	Zoltán Pollák	Erima	Erima
Szolnok	(Hungary) Károly Kis	Krisztián Mile	hummel	Stadler Rail
Vasas	(Hungary) Károly Szanyó	Mohamed Remili	Adidas	Linartech
Zalaegerszeg	(Hungary) Emil Lőrincz	Gábor Simonfalvi	mass	Pharos

== League table ==
Pos	Team	Pld	W	D	L	GF	GA	GD	Pts	Promotion or relegation
1	Vasas (C, P)	30	21	3	6	68	31	+37	66	Promotion to Nemzeti Bajnokság I
2	Békéscsaba (P)	30	18	7	5	42	23	+19	61	Promotion to Nemzeti Bajnokság I
3	Gyirmót	30	16	11	3	54	32	+22	59	
4	Mezőkövesd	30	13	9	8	53	37	+16	48	
5	Sopron	30	12	12	6	46	38	+8	48	
6	Szolnok	30	13	7	10	50	47	+3	46	
7	Szeged	30	13	6	11	36	32	+4	45	
8	Zalaegerszeg	30	10	8	12	42	47	−5	38	
9	Soroksár	30	9	6	15	32	41	−9	33	
10	Szigetszentmiklós	30	7	12	11	24	35	−11	33	
11	Ajka	30	8	8	14	43	46	−3	32	
12	Csákvár	30	8	8	14	44	56	−12	32	
13	Balmazújváros	30	8	8	14	35	52	−17	32	
14	Siófok	30	7	10	13	40	52	−12	31	
15	Cegléd (R)	30	6	9	15	33	56	−23	27	Relegation to Nemzeti Bajnokság III
16	Kaposvár (R)	30	5	8	17	30	47	−17	23	Relegation to Nemzeti Bajnokság III

Source: mlsz.hu (in Hungarian)
Rules for classification: 1st points; 2nd overall wins; 3rd goal difference; 4th head-to-head points; 5th head-to-head goal difference; 6th head-to-head away goals scored; 7th fair-play points; 8th drawing of lots
(C) Champions; (P) Promoted; (R) Relegated

=== Positions by round ===
Team ╲ Round	1	2	3	4	5	6	7	8	9	10	11	12	13	14	15	16	17	18	19	20	21	22	23	24	25	26	27	28	29	30
Ajka	1	8	11	12	8	11	13	15	16	11	13	11	12	12	11															
Balmazújváros	11	16	16	16	16	16	16	16	16	16	16	16	16	16	16															
Békéscsaba	4	11	6	7	10	12	10	6	6	5	4	4	3	4	2															
Cegléd	7	12	13	13	13	14	14	13	14	15	12	13	13	13	13															
Csákvár	12	5	10	11	12	10	12	12	12	13	14	14	14	14	14															
Gyirmót	15	6	4	3	2	2	2	1	1	1	1	1	4	2	4															
Kaposvár	6	4	8	9	6	6	4	7	8	10	9	9	11	11	12															
Mezőkövesd	5	2	2	2	3	3	3	3	3	4	2	2	1	1	3															
Siófok	10	15	15	15	15	15	15	14	13	14	15	15	15	15	15															
Sopron	13	13	14	14	14	13	11	11	11	9	7	7	7	7	9															
Soroksár	2	9	3	4	4	4	7	10	10	12	11	11	8	8	7															
Szeged	9	3	7	8	5	9	6	8	9	8	6	6	6	6	6															
Szigetszentmiklós	14	10	5	5	7	7	9	5	5	6	8	8	10	10	10															
Szolnok	8	14	9	10	11	8	5	4	4	3	5	5	5	5	5															
Vasas	3	1	1	1	1	1	1	2	2	2	3	3	2	3	1															
Zalaegerszeg	16	7	12	6	9	5	8	9	7	7	10	10	9	9	8															

Source: mlsz.hu (in Hungarian)
= Promotion to 2015–16 Nemzeti Bajnokság I; = Relegation to 2015–16 Nemzeti Bajnokság III

== Results ==
Home \ Away	AJK	BAL	BÉK	CEG	CSÁ	GYI	KAP	MEZ	SIÓ	SOP	SOR	SZE	SZI	SZL	VAS	ZTE
Ajka		5–0	0–2			0–1			2–2	3–1	2–0		2–1			2–2
Balmazújváros				1–1	3–2		0–0	2–3	1–1			1–2		0–3	2–4	
Békéscsaba		4–2				0–2	1–0		1–0	1–0						2–0
Cegléd	2–2		0–3		3–2			0–2			0–0		0–1		2–0	
Csákvár	2–2		4–0					0–3			2–0	0–1	1–1		2–6	0–0
Gyirmót		4–0		2–1	1–1		3–1	2–2				1–0		0–2		
Kaposvár	2–0			0–0	1–0			1–1	1–3			0–1		1–2	3–1	
Mezőkövesd	3–1		4–0							2–0	1–0		0–0		1–2	1–1
Siófok				2–2	2–2	2–2		1–2		1–2	0–4	1–1			1–5	2–2
Sopron		0–2		2–2	2–0	1–1	2–2					3–2		2–2		
Soroksár		3–0	1–0			0–4	2–0			2–3		0–3		2–2		2–0
Szeged	1–0		0–3	2–2				2–1					0–1		0–1	
Szigetszentmiklós		1–0	0–1			0–0	0–3		1–1	1–1	1–3			1–2		3–1
Szolnok	1–0		1–2	1–1	2–1			3–3	3–2			1–2			3–2	
Vasas	2–0		3–2			2–0				1–2	3–0		0–1			2–0
Zalaegerszegi TE		3–3		2–0		2–3	2–1			2–1		2–1		3–0		

Updated to match(es) played on 20 January 2015. Source: mlsz.hu (in Hungarian)
Legend: Blue = home team win; Yellow = draw; Red = away team win.

== Top goalscorers ==
Rank	Player	Club	Goals
1	(Hungary) Mohamed Remili	Vasas	14
2	(Hungary) István Ferenczi	Vasas	12
3	(Hungary) Péter Rajczi	Kaposvár	9
4	(Hungary) János Máté	Mezőkövesd	7
4	(Hungary) Tamás Germán	Szeged	7
4	(Hungary) István Eszlátyi	Sopron	7
4	(Hungary) Balázs Lovrencsics	Soroksár	7
4	(Hungary) József Magasföldi	Gyirmót	7

Updated to games played on 22 November 2014

== See also ==
- 2014–15 Magyar Kupa
- 2014–15 Nemzeti Bajnokság I
- 2014–15 Nemzeti Bajnokság III
