= Bálint Vogyicska =

Hungarian footballer

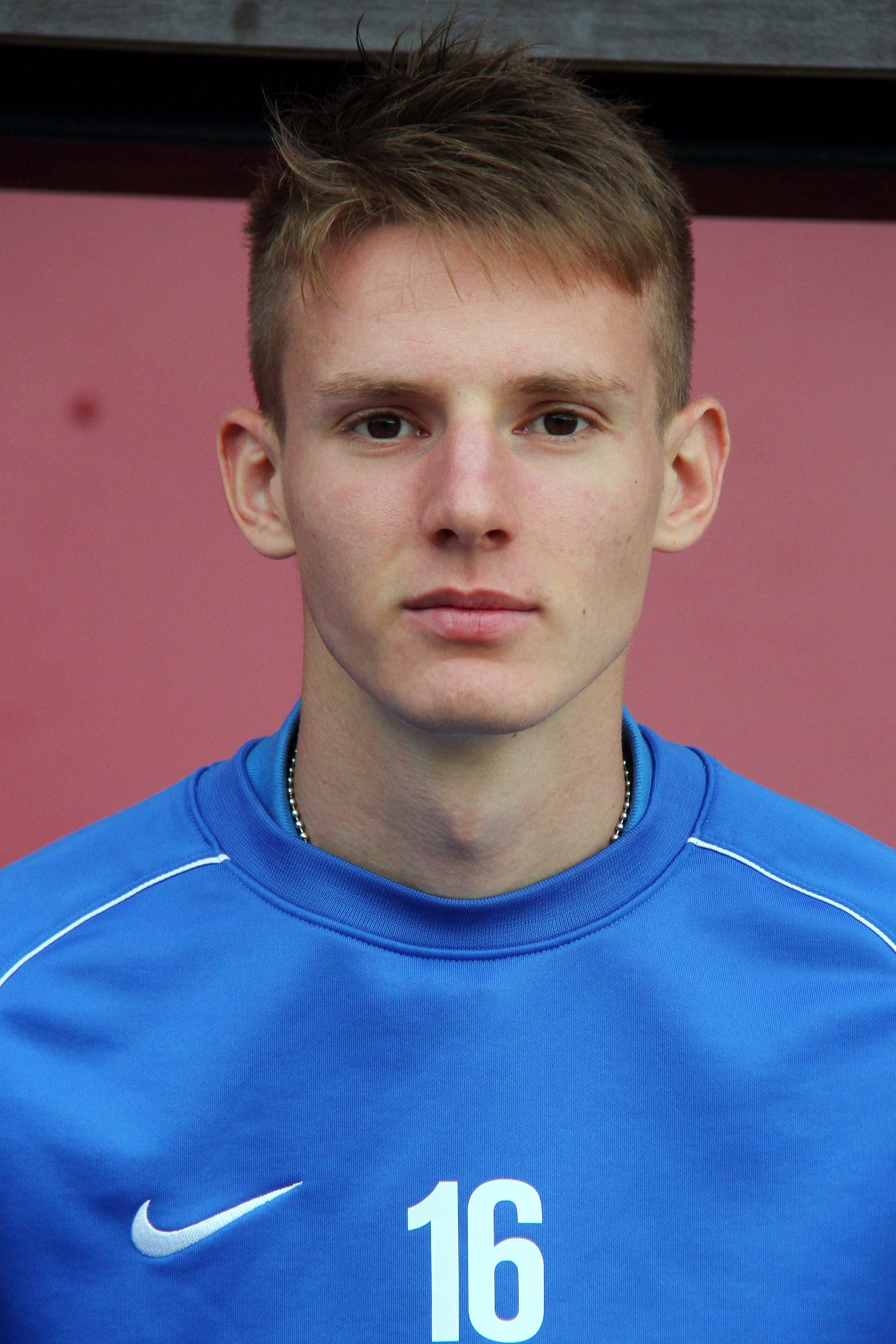

Personal information
- Date of birth: 27 February 1998 (age 28)
- Place of birth: Mohács, Hungary
- Height: 1.77 m (5 ft 9 1/2 in)
- Position: Right midfielder

Team information
- Current team: Kozármisleny
- Number: 10

Youth career
- 2011–2015: MTK Budapest

Senior career*
Years	Team	Apps	(Gls)
2015–2019	MTK Budapest	50	(1)
2017–2018	→ Vasas (loan)	20	(0)
2019–2022	Gyirmót	37	(0)
2022–2024	Ajka	44	(2)
2024–	Kozármisleny	0	(0)

International career
2014	Hungary U-16	1	(0)
2014–2015	Hungary U-17	6	(0)
2016	Hungary U-18	1	(1)
2015–2017	Hungary U-19	14	(0)
- * Club domestic league appearances and goals as of 18 February 2024

Bálint Vogyicska (born 27 February 1998) is a Hungarian football player who plays for Kozármisleny.

== Club career ==
On 16 February 2022, Vogyicska joined Ajka.

On 8 January 2024, he moved to Kozármisleny.

== Career statistics ==
Appearances and goals by club, season and competition
Club	Season	League			Cup		Europe		Total	
Club	Season	Division	Apps	Goals	Apps	Goals	Apps	Goals	Apps	Goals
MTK Budapest
MTK Budapest	2014–15	Nemzeti Bajnokság I	2	0	0	0	—		2	0
MTK Budapest	2015–16	Nemzeti Bajnokság I	6	0	0	0	—		6	0
MTK Budapest	2016–17	Nemzeti Bajnokság I	24	1	1	0	0	0	25	1
MTK Budapest	2018–19	Nemzeti Bajnokság I	18	0	3	2	—		21	2
MTK Budapest	Total		50	1	4	2	0	0	54	3
Vasas	2017–18	Nemzeti Bajnokság I	20	0	1	0	—		21	0
Gyirmót
Gyirmót	2019–20	Nemzeti Bajnokság II	17	0	3	0	—		20	0
Gyirmót	2020–21	Nemzeti Bajnokság II	17	0	1	0	—		18	0
Gyirmót	2021–22	Nemzeti Bajnokság I	3	0	2	0	—		5	0
Gyirmót	Total		37	0	6	0	0	0	43	0
Ajka	2021–22	Nemzeti Bajnokság II	10	1	0	0	—		10	1
Career total			117	2	11	2	0	0	128	4

Updated to games played as of 15 May 2022.
