= Botond Király =

Hungarian footballer

Personal information
- Date of birth: 26 October 1994 (age 32)
- Place of birth: Pápa, Hungary
- Height: 1.82 m (6 ft 0 in)
- Position: Right midfielder

Team information
- Current team: Pápa

Youth career
- 2004–2011: Pápa

Senior career*
Years	Team	Apps	(Gls)
2011–2015	Pápa	32	(1)
2015–2016	Rákosmente	30	(23)
2016–2020	Vasas	38	(8)
2018	→ Csákvár (loan)	16	(2)
2020–2022	Győri ETO	3	(0)
2022–	Pápa	0	(0)
- * Club domestic league appearances and goals as of 31 July 2022

Botond Király (born 26 October 1994) is a Hungarian professional footballer who plays for Pápa.

== Career statistics ==
Appearances and goals by club, season and competition
Club	Season	League			Cup		League Cup		Europe		Total	
Club	Season	Division	Apps	Goals	Apps	Goals	Apps	Goals	Apps	Goals	Apps	Goals
Pápa
Pápa	2011–12	Nemzeti Bajnokság I	0	0	1	0	0	0	0	0	1	0
Pápa	2012–13	Nemzeti Bajnokság I	7	1	1	1	5	1	0	0	13	3
Pápa	2013–14	Nemzeti Bajnokság I	12	0	4	1	6	0	0	0	22	1
Pápa	2014–15	Nemzeti Bajnokság I	8	0	1	0	5	0	0	0	14	0
Pápa	Total		27	1	7	2	16	1	0	0	50	4
Career total			27	1	7	2	16	1	0	0	50	4

Updated to games played as of 6 December 2014.
