= Mohamed Remili =

Hungarian footballer (born 1991)

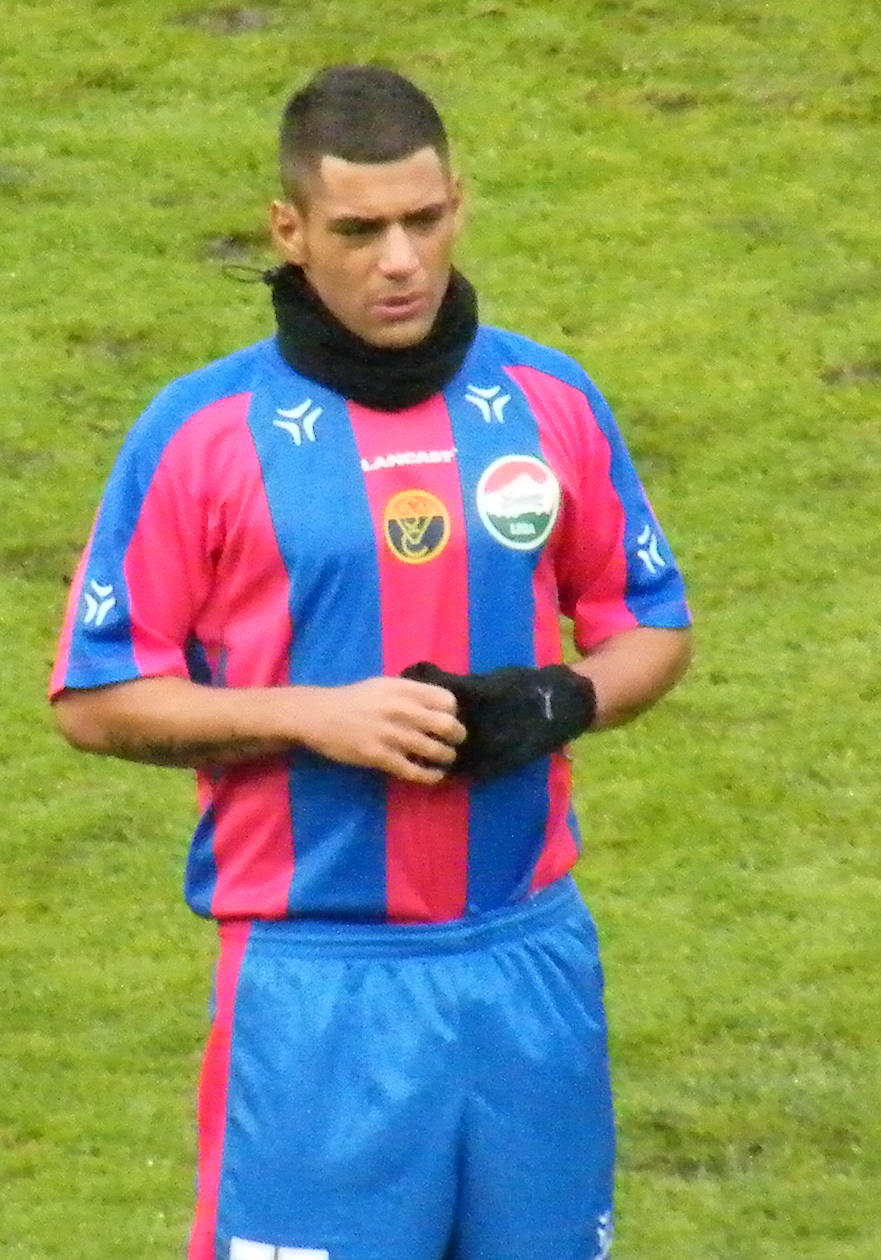

Personal information
- Date of birth: 31 May 1985 (age 41)
- Place of birth: Hussein Dey, Algeria
- Height: 1.83 m (6 ft 0 in)
- Position: Winger

Team information
- Current team: Kelen

Youth career
- 2002–2005: Szolnok

Senior career*
| Years | Team | Apps | (Gls) |
| 2005–2006 | Pápa | 10 | (1) |
| 2006–2008 | Szolnok | 63 | (17) |
| 2008–2013 | Újpest | 39 | (4) |
| 2009–2010 | → Vasas (loan) | 19 | (4) |
| 2010–2011 | → Szolnok (loan) | 20 | (7) |
| 2013–2018 | Vasas | 142 | (50) |
| 2018–2020 | Paks | 35 | (6) |
| 2020 | Siófok | 7 | (4) |
| 2020–2022 | III. Kerület | 55 | (17) |
| 2022–2023 | Jászberény | 19 | (6) |
| 2023 | Vecsés | 0 | (0) |
| 2023– | Kelen | 16 | (6) |

International career
| 2003–2004 | Hungary U20 | | |
- * Club domestic league appearances and goals as of 06:14, 7 December 2021 (UTC)

Mohamed Remili (born 31 May 1985) is a Hungarian footballer who plays as a winger for Kelen in Nemzeti Bajnokság III.

== Career ==
He joined Újpest FC from Szolnoki MÁV FC in June 2008. and then on 8 August 2009 he moved to Vasas Budapest.

== Career statistics ==
As of 1 December 2019

Appearances and goals by club, season and competition
| Club | Season | League | | | Cup | | League Cup | | Total | |
| Club | Season | Division | Apps | Goals | Apps | Goals | Apps | Goals | Apps | Goals |
|---|---|---|---|---|---|---|---|---|---|---|
| Pápa | 2005–06 | Nemzeti Bajnokság I | 10 | 1 | 0 | 0 | — | | 10 | 1 |
| Szolnok | 2004–05 | Nemzeti Bajnokság II | 24 | 3 | 3 | 1 | — | | 27 | 4 |
| Szolnok | 2005–06 | Nemzeti Bajnokság II | 9 | 0 | 0 | 0 | — | | 9 | 0 |
| Szolnok | 2006–07 | Nemzeti Bajnokság II | 26 | 9 | 0 | 0 | — | | 26 | 9 |
| Szolnok | 2007–08 | Nemzeti Bajnokság II | 28 | 8 | 1 | 0 | — | | 29 | 8 |
| Szolnok | Total | | 87 | 20 | 4 | 1 | 0 | 0 | 91 | 21 |
| Újpest | 2009–10 | Nemzeti Bajnokság I | 1 | 0 | 0 | 0 | 0 | 0 | 1 | 0 |
| Újpest | 2010–11 | Nemzeti Bajnokság I | 0 | 0 | 0 | 0 | 0 | 0 | 0 | 0 |
| Újpest | 2011–12 | Nemzeti Bajnokság I | 12 | 1 | 6 | 4 | 1 | 1 | 19 | 6 |
| Újpest | 2012–13 | Nemzeti Bajnokság I | 27 | 3 | 1 | 0 | 1 | 0 | 29 | 3 |
| Újpest | Total | | 39 | 4 | 7 | 4 | 2 | 1 | 49 | 9 |
| Vasas (loan) | 2009–10 | Nemzeti Bajnokság I | 19 | 4 | 1 | 1 | 4 | 1 | 24 | 6 |
| Szolnok (loan) | 2010–11 | Nemzeti Bajnokság I | 20 | 7 | 0 | 0 | 2 | 1 | 22 | 8 |
| Vasas | 2013–14 | Nemzeti Bajnokság II | 28 | 17 | 1 | 0 | 7 | 3 | 36 | 20 |
| Vasas | 2014–15 | Nemzeti Bajnokság II | 29 | 19 | 1 | 0 | 5 | 0 | 35 | 19 |
| Vasas | 2015–16 | Nemzeti Bajnokság I | 27 | 6 | 2 | 4 | — | | 29 | 10 |
| Vasas | 2016–17 | Nemzeti Bajnokság I | 30 | 3 | 9 | 3 | — | | 39 | 6 |
| Vasas | 2017–18 | Nemzeti Bajnokság I | 28 | 5 | 2 | 0 | — | | 30 | 5 |
| Vasas | Total | | 142 | 50 | 15 | 7 | 12 | 3 | 169 | 60 |
| Paks | 2018–19 | Nemzeti Bajnokság I | 23 | 4 | 5 | 2 | — | | 28 | 6 |
| Paks | 2019–20 | Nemzeti Bajnokság I | 12 | 2 | 1 | 0 | — | | 13 | 2 |
| Paks | Total | | 35 | 6 | 6 | 2 | 0 | 0 | 41 | 8 |
| Career total | | | 352 | 92 | 33 | 15 | 20 | 6 | 406 | 113 |

== Honours ==
- Hungarian Cup
  - Runners-up : 2016–17
