= Felix Burmeister =

German footballer (born 1990)

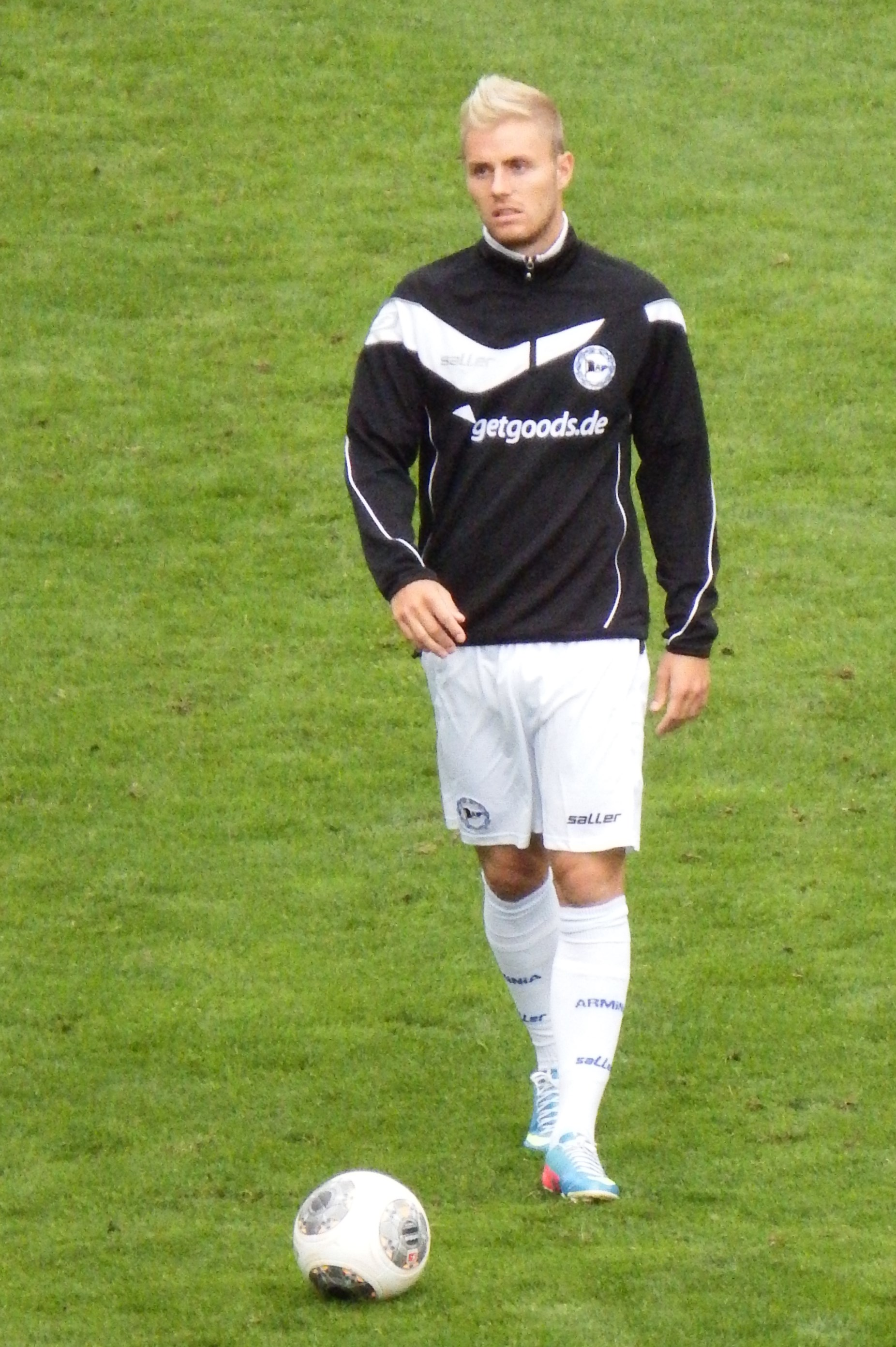
- Burmeister in 2013

Personal information
- Date of birth: 9 March 1990 (age 36)
- Place of birth: Würzburg, West Germany
- Height: 1.86 m (6 ft 1 in)
- Position: Centre-back

Youth career
- –2006: SV Hambühren
- 2006–2009: Hannover 96

Senior career*
Years	Team	Apps	(Gls)
2009–2011	Hannover 96 II	50	(11)
2010–2011	Hannover 96	0	(0)
2011–2016	Arminia Bielefeld	99	(2)
2013	→ Arminia Bielefeld II	1	(0)
2016–2018	Vasas	54	(7)
2018–2021	Eintracht Braunschweig	40	(1)
- * Club domestic league appearances and goals as of 12 August 2021

Felix Burmeister (born 9 March 1990) is a German professional footballer who plays as a centre-back. He is without a club.

== Career ==
In June 2018 Burmeister joined Eintracht Braunschweig.
