= Janek Sternberg =

German footballer (born 1992)

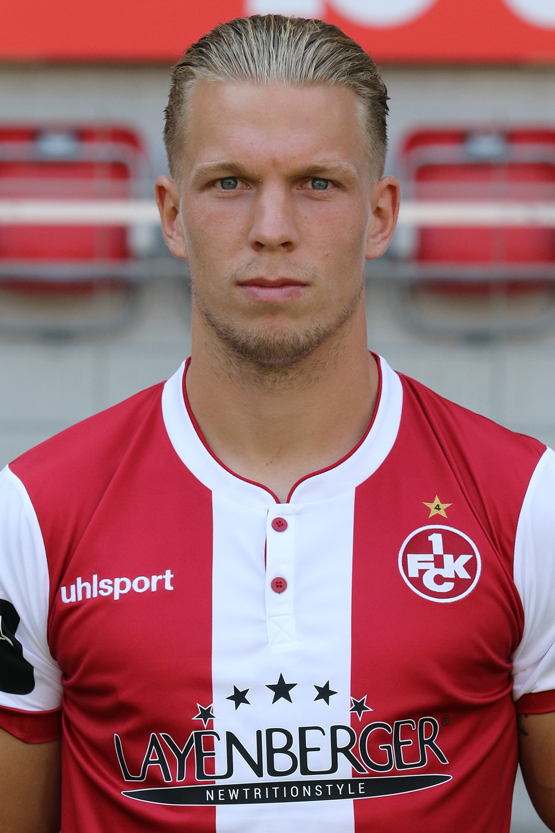
- Sternberg with 1. FC Kaiserslautern in 2018

Personal information
- Date of birth: 19 October 1992 (age 34)
- Place of birth: Bad Segeberg, Germany
- Height: 1.82 m (6 ft 0 in)
- Position: Left-back

Team information
- Current team: SV Todesfelde
- Number: 37

Youth career
- 1996–2006: Leezener SC
- 2006–2007: SV Eichede
- 2007–2011: Hamburger SV

Senior career*
Years	Team	Apps	(Gls)
2011–2013	Hamburg II	66	(3)
2011–2013	Hamburg	0	(0)
2013–2017	Werder Bremen II	47	(4)
2014–2017	Werder Bremen	25	(0)
2017–2018	Ferencváros	16	(1)
2018–2020	1. FC Kaiserslautern	39	(1)
2020–2022	Hallescher FC	64	(0)
2023–2024	VfB Lübeck	43	(1)
2024–	SV Todesfelde	56	(2)

International career^{‡}
2009	Germany U18	4	(0)
- * Club domestic league appearances and goals as of 22 September 2026 ‡ National team caps and goals as of 1 July 2019

Janek Sternberg (born 19 October 1992) is a German professional footballer who plays as a left-back for SV Todesfelde in Regionalliga Nord.

== Club career ==
Sternberg joined Werder Bremen in 2013 from Hamburger SV. After initially playing matches with Werder's reserve team, he made his first team debut in a Bundesliga game against SC Paderborn 07 on 29 November, 2014. He played the full game in a 4–0 home win.

On 21 January, 2017, Sternberg joined Ferencváros.

In May 2018, 1. FC Kaiserslautern, newly relegated to the 3. Liga, announced Sternberg would join for the 2018–19 season, having agreed a contract until 2021.

On 31 January, 2020, Sternberg joined Hallescher FC on a deal lasting until the summer of 2021.

Free agent Sternberg moved to VfB Lübeck, which placed first in the Regionalliga Nord, in January 2023. He signed a one-year contract with the option of another year.

== International career ==
Sternberg is a youth international for Germany at the U18 level.
