= Tamás Vaskó =

Hungarian footballer

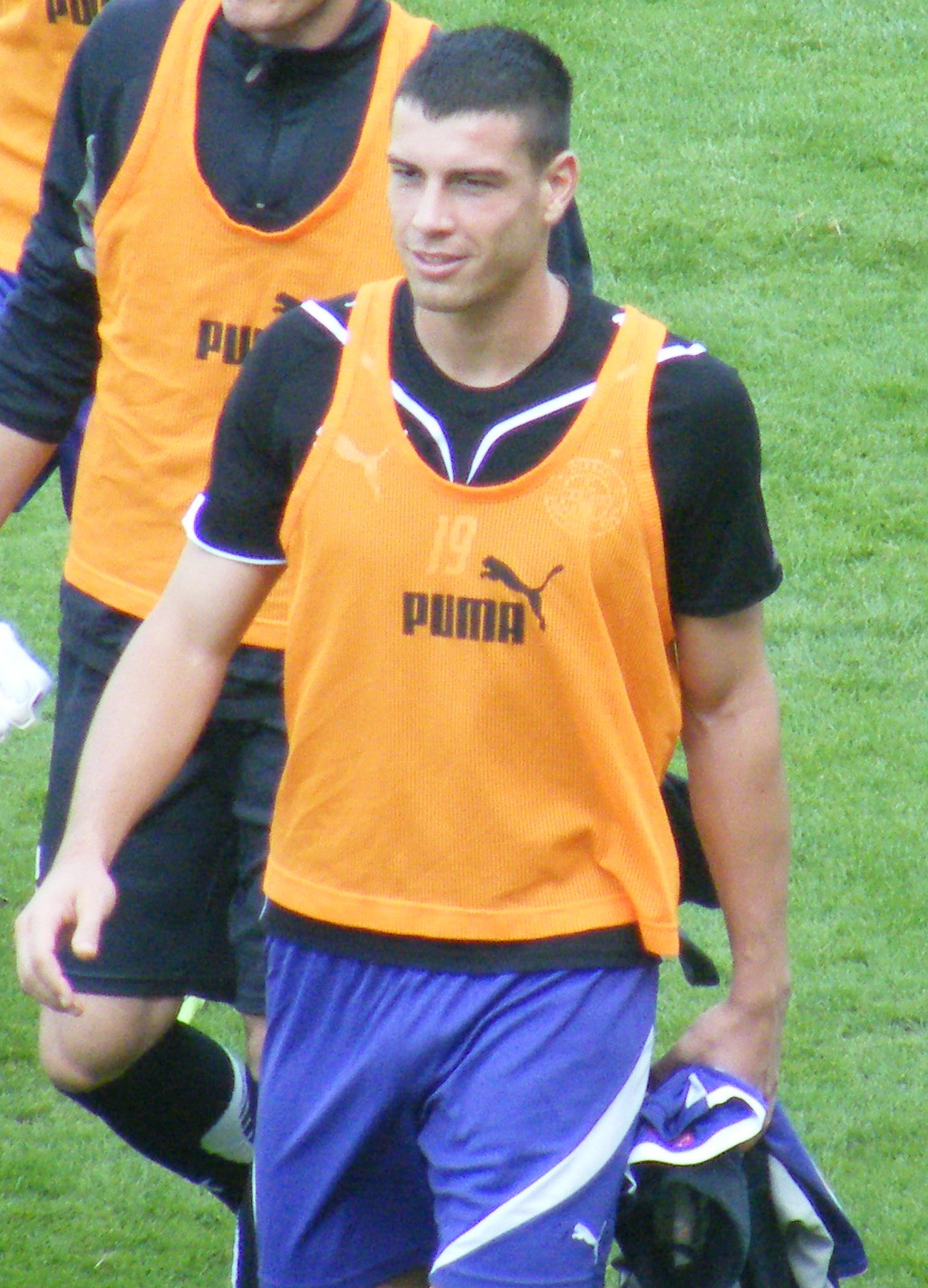

Personal information
- Date of birth: 20 February 1984 (age 42)
- Place of birth: Budapest, Hungary
- Height: 6 ft 4 in (1.93 m)
- Position: Centre back

Youth career
- 1997–2001: Vasas

Senior career*
| Years | Team | Apps | (Gls) |
| 2002–2010 | Újpest | 67 | (7) |
| 2004–2005 | → Tatabánya (loan) | 22 | (3) |
| 2007–2008 | → Bristol City (loan) | 19 | (1) |
| 2008–2009 | → Avellino (loan) | 30 | (2) |
| 2010–2012 | Videoton | 43 | (1) |
| 2012–2013 | Kecskemét | 26 | (1) |
| 2013–2014 | Mezőkövesd | 3 | (0) |
| 2014–2015 | Dunaújváros | 13 | (1) |
| 2015–2016 | Békéscsaba | 22 | (3) |
| 2016–2019 | Vasas | 66 | (7) |
| 2019–2021 | Eger | 8 | (0) |
| 2021–2023 | Csákvár | 66 | (11) |

International career
| 2007–2009 | Hungary | 11 | (0) |
- * Club domestic league appearances and goals

Tamás Vaskó (Hungarian pronunciation: [ˈtɒmaːʃ ˈvɒʃkoː]; born 20 February 1984) is a Hungarian former footballer.

== Career ==
Vaskó started to play football in smaller clubs and joined Vasas in 1998. Three years later he started to play for Újpest FC, and he has been with the team ever since, except for a year he spent on loan with FC Tatabánya.

In 2006, despite his young age, he became the captain of Újpest FC.

Vaskó was on trial at Southampton F.C. during July 2007, but he failed to make sufficient impression and was not signed by the Championship club. Vaskó has now sealed a year-long loan deal with newly promoted League 1 runners up Bristol City. At the end of the loan deal Bristol City have the option of signing the defender on a 3-year contract. In the games he has played he has made an impression, scoring a goal against Burnley and defending well. However, he was sent back to Újpest FC after Bristol City did not wish to sign him permanently. Now is a player of US Avellino Italy second division. However, his spell at Bristol City seems to have made a lasting impression on the club's management, who have been rumoured to have made a bid to resign the Centre Half permanently. But instead he moved to Italian side Avellino. His loan spell ended after the 2009 season and he returned to Újpest FC.

== Nickname ==
His nickname whilst at Újpest FC was 'The White Rhino' because of his immense size.

== Career statistics ==
=== Club ===
As of 23 March 2014

Appearances and goals by club, season and competition
| Club | Season | League | | | National Cup | | League Cup | | Europe | | Total | |
| Club | Season | Division | Apps | Goals | Apps | Goals | Apps | Goals | Apps | Goals | Apps | Goals |
|---|---|---|---|---|---|---|---|---|---|---|---|---|
| Újpest | 2003–04 | Nemzeti Bajnokság I | 2 | 0 | 0 | 0 | 0 | 0 | 0 | 0 | 2 | 0 |
| Újpest | 2005–06 | Nemzeti Bajnokság I | 15 | 2 | 0 | 0 | 0 | 0 | 0 | 0 | 15 | 2 |
| Újpest | 2006–07 | Nemzeti Bajnokság I | 27 | 3 | 5 | 1 | 0 | 0 | 0 | 0 | 32 | 4 |
| Újpest | 2007–08 | Nemzeti Bajnokság I | 1 | 0 | 0 | 0 | 0 | 0 | 0 | 0 | 1 | 0 |
| Újpest | 2008–09 | Nemzeti Bajnokság I | 5 | 1 | 0 | 0 | 0 | 0 | 0 | 0 | 5 | 1 |
| Újpest | 2009–10 | Nemzeti Bajnokság I | 17 | 1 | 6 | 1 | 2 | 0 | 0 | 0 | 25 | 2 |
| Újpest | Total | | 67 | 7 | 11 | 2 | 2 | 0 | 0 | 0 | 80 | 9 |
| Tatabánya (loan) | 2004–05 | Nemzeti Bajnokság II | 22 | 3 | 1 | 0 | 0 | 0 | 0 | 0 | 23 | 3 |
| Bristol City (loan) | 2007–08 | Championship | 19 | 1 | 1 | 0 | 1 | 0 | 0 | 0 | 21 | 1 |
| Avellino (loan) | 2008–09 | Serie B | 30 | 2 | 0 | 0 | 0 | 0 | 0 | 0 | 30 | 2 |
| Videoton | 2010–11 | Nemzeti Bajnokság I | 26 | 0 | 7 | 1 | 2 | 0 | 0 | 0 | 35 | 1 |
| Videoton | 2011–12 | Nemzeti Bajnokság I | 16 | 1 | 3 | 0 | 8 | 1 | 0 | 0 | 27 | 2 |
| Videoton | 2012–13 | Nemzeti Bajnokság I | 1 | 0 | 0 | 0 | 0 | 0 | 0 | 0 | 1 | 0 |
| Videoton | Total | | 43 | 1 | 10 | 1 | 10 | 1 | 0 | 0 | 63 | 3 |
| Kecskemét | 2012–13 | Nemzeti Bajnokság I | 26 | 1 | 1 | 0 | 4 | 0 | 0 | 0 | 31 | 1 |
| Mezőkövesd | 2013–14 | Nemzeti Bajnokság I | 3 | 0 | 0 | 0 | 2 | 2 | 0 | 0 | 5 | 2 |
| Puskás | 2013–14 | Nemzeti Bajnokság I | 4 | 0 | 0 | 0 | 1 | 0 | 0 | 0 | 5 | 0 |
| Career total | | | 214 | 15 | 24 | 3 | 20 | 3 | 0 | 0 | 258 | 21 |

=== International ===
Appearances and goals by national team and year
| National team | Year | Apps | Goals |
|---|---|---|---|
| Hungary | 2007 | 9 | 0 |
| Hungary | 2008 | 1 | 0 |
| Hungary | 2009 | 1 | 0 |
| Total | | 11 | 0 |
