= Tamás Kulcsár =

Hungarian footballer

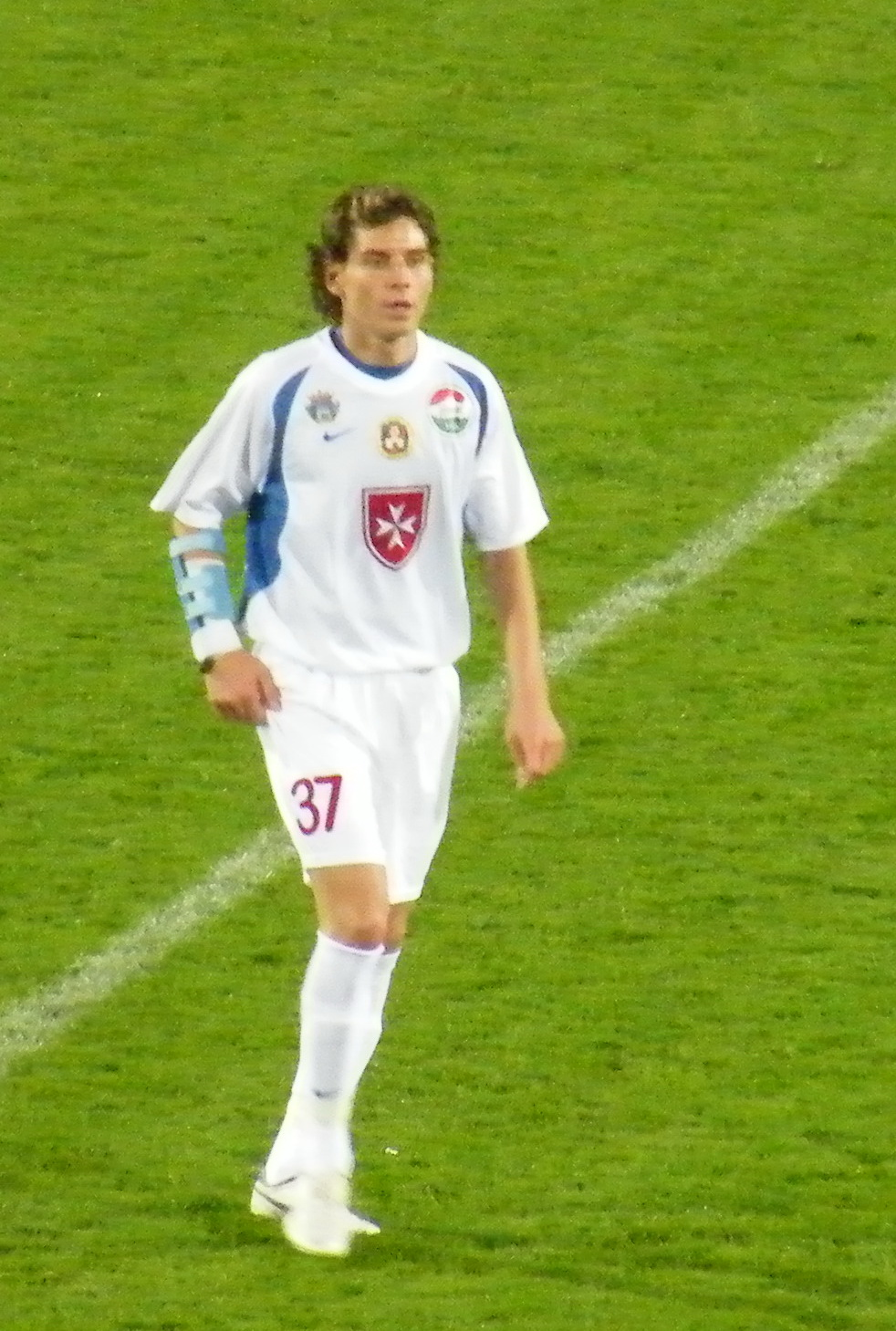

Personal information
- Date of birth: 13 October 1982 (age 44)
- Place of birth: Debrecen, Hungary
- Height: 1.85 m (6 ft 1 in)
- Position: Forward

Team information
- Current team: Unione FC Budapest
- Number: 7

Senior career*
Years	Team	Apps	(Gls)
2002–2003	Hajdúnánás FK	28	(9)
2003–2004	Létavértes SC 97		
2004–2006	Bőcs	55	(18)
2006–2007	Vác	28	(2)
2007–2009	MTK	32	(3)
2008–2009	→ Videoton (loan)	10	(2)
2009–2010	Polonia Warsaw	6	(0)
2010	→ MTK (loan)	15	(3)
2010–2016	Debrecen	119	(29)
2016–2018	Vasas SC	28	(5)
2018–2019	MTK Budapest	27	(4)
2019–2020	Budaörsi	17	(8)
2020–	Unione FC Budapest	14	(10)
- * Club domestic league appearances and goals as of 17:41, 24 March 2021 (UTC)

Tamás Kulcsár (born 13 October 1982) is a Hungarian professional footballer who plays as a forward for Unione FC Budapest.

== Career ==
Kulcsár was born in Debrecen.

On 1 May 2012, Kulcsár won the Magyar Kupa with Debrecen by beating MTK on penalty shoot-out in the 2011–12 season. This was the fifth Hungarian Cup trophy for Debrecen.

On 12 May 2012, Kulcsár won the Nemzeti Bajnokság I title with Debrecen after beating Pécs in the 28th round of the Hungarian League by 4–0 at the Oláh Gábor út Stadium which resulted in the sixth Hungarian League title for the Hajdús.

On 19 June 2019 Budaörsi SC announced that Kulcsár had joined the club.

== Honours ==
MTK

- Nemzeti Bajnokság I: 2007–08
- Szuperkupa: 2008

Debrecen

- Nemzeti Bajnokság I: 2011–12, 2013–14
- Magyar Kupa: 2011–12, 2012–13
