= Márk Kleisz =

Hungarian footballer

Personal information
- Full name: Márk Kleisz
- Date of birth: 2 July 1998 (age 28)
- Place of birth: Budapest, Hungary
- Position: Midfielder

Team information
- Current team: III. Kerület (on loan from Vasas)
- Number: 24

Youth career
- 2004–2012: Újpest
- 2012–2015: Fővárosi Vízművek
- 2015–2016: Vasas

Senior career*
Years	Team	Apps	(Gls)
2016–	Vasas	35	(0)
2021–	→ III. Kerület (loan)	10	(0)

International career^{‡}
2016–2017	Hungary U-19	6	(1)
2019	Hungary U-21	2	(0)
2017–	Hungary	1	(0)
- * Club domestic league appearances and goals as of 20:20, 4 February 2022 (UTC) ‡ National team caps and goals as of 25 December 2020

Márk Kleisz (born 2 July 1998) is a Hungarian footballer who plays as a midfielder for III. Kerületi TVE on loan from Vasas SC.

== Club career ==
=== Vasas ===
In 2016, Kleisz was called up for Vasas SC's first team. On 17 July 2016, Kleisz made his senior team debut in the Nemzeti Bajnokság I against MTK Budapest, replacing Martin Ádám at the 86th minute.

== Club career statistics ==
Club performance			League		Cup		Continental		Total	
Season	Club	League	Apps	Goals	Apps	Goals	Apps	Goals	Apps	Goals
Hungary			League		Magyar Kupa		Europe		Total	
2016–17	Vasas SC	Nemzeti Bajnokság I	8	0	0	0	—		8	0
Total	Hungary		8	0	0	0	0	0	8	0
Total	Career total		8	0	0	0	0	0	8	0
