= 2021–22 Vasas FC season =

Vasas
2021–22 season
- Chairman: László Markovits
- Manager: Attila Kuttor
- Stadium: Illovszky Rudolf Stadion
- Nemzeti Bajnokság II: 1st (promoted)
- Magyar Kupa: Round of 16
- Top goalscorer: League: Róbert Feczesin (15); All: Róbert Feczesin; András Radó (15 each)
Home colours	Away colours

The 2021–22 season was Vasas Sport Club's 23rd competitive season, 4th consecutive season in the Nemzeti Bajnokság II and 110th year in existence as a football club. In addition to the domestic league, Vasas participated in this season's editions of the Magyar Kupa.

At the end of 2021, Vasas was one point behind first placed Diósgyőr in the league. The club made an unbeaten run in the second half of the season from the 16th round, and haven't lost a home game in whole season except in the domestic cup. In the Round of 16, they knocked out from the competition after losing 2–0 against first division Ferencváros after beating Budaörs and third division team, Jászberény.

On 2 May, Vasas became the champion of the second division for the second time, after a draw against Haladás.

== Squad ==
As of 9 August 2021

Note: Flags indicate national team as defined under FIFA eligibility rules; some limited exceptions apply. Players may hold more than one non-FIFA nationality.

No.	Pos.	Nation	Player
2	DF	HUN	Donát Szivacski
3	DF	HUN	Olivér Kalmár
4	DF	HUN	Zoltán Szilágyi
5	DF	HUN	Róbert Litauszki
6	FW	HUN	Botond Birtalan
7	MF	HUN	Richárd Vernes
8	MF	HUN	Krisztián Köböl
9	FW	HUN	Róbert Feczesin
10	MF	HUN	Lóránd Szatmári (captain)
13	MF	HUN	Zsombor Berecz
14	MF	HUN	Dávid Márkvárt
15	MF	HUN	Sándor Hidi
17	MF	HUN	Kristóf Hinora
18	FW	HUN	Donát Varga

No.	Pos.	Nation	Player
20	MF	HUN	Márk Kleisz
21	MF	HUN	Máté Pátkai
23	DF	HUN	Martin Csató
25	DF	HUN	Ádám Viczián
26	GK	HUN	János Uram
29	DF	HUN	Botond Terbe
33	FW	HUN	Ádám Balajti
34	DF	HUN	Kenneth Otigba
55	GK	HUN	Levente Jova
58	DF	HUN	Erik Silye
70	FW	HUN	András Radó
71	FW	HUN	Gergely Bobál
77	MF	HUN	László Pekár

== Transfers ==
=== Summer ===
In: Note: Flags indicate national team as defined under FIFA eligibility rules; some limited exceptions apply. Players may hold more than one non-FIFA nationality.

No.	Pos.	Nation	Player
14	MF	HUN	Dávid Márkvárt (from Diósgyőr)
23	DF	HUN	Martin Csató (loan return from Csákvár)
24	MF	HUN	Róbert Rétyi (loan return from Ajka)
26	GK	HUN	János Uram (from Békéscsaba)
71	FW	HUN	Gergely Bobál (from (Portugal) Nacional)
—	MF	HUN	Máté Vida (from (Slovakia) Dunajská Streda)
—	MF	HUN	Zoltán Szedlár (loan return from Dorog)
—	MF	HUN	Benedek Murka (loan return from Csákvár)
—	DF	HUN	Ádám Újvárosi (loan return from Szentlőrinc)

Out: Note: Flags indicate national team as defined under FIFA eligibility rules; some limited exceptions apply. Players may hold more than one non-FIFA nationality.

No.	Pos.	Nation	Player
3	DF	HUN	Olivér Kalmár (to Budafok)
7	FW	HUN	Richárd Vernes (loan to Győr)
8	MF	HUN	Krisztián Köböl (to III. Kerület)
12	MF	HUN	Milán Kovács (loan to Szeged)
20	MF	HUN	Márk Kleisz (loan to III. Kerület)
83	DF	HUN	Bence Tóth (loan to Szolnok)
98	DF	ROU	Szabolcs Kilyén (to Nyíregyháza)
—	MF	HUN	Zoltán Szedlár (to Dorog)
—	DF	HUN	Ádám Újvárosi (loan to Szentlőrinc)
—	MF	HUN	Benedek Murka (loan to Ajka)

=== Winter ===
In: Note: Flags indicate national team as defined under FIFA eligibility rules; some limited exceptions apply. Players may hold more than one non-FIFA nationality.

No.	Pos.	Nation	Player
8	MF	HUN	Sebestyén Ihrig-Farkas (from Budafok)
16	DF	HUN	Péter Kiss-Szemán (loan return from Szentlőrinc)
67	FW	HUN	Dominik Cipf (from Siófok)
97	FW	HUN	Dávid Zimonyi (loan from Zalaegerszeg)
99	MF	HUN	József Szalai (loan return from Kecskemét)

Out: Note: Flags indicate national team as defined under FIFA eligibility rules; some limited exceptions apply. Players may hold more than one non-FIFA nationality.

No.	Pos.	Nation	Player
6	FW	HUN	Botond Birtalan (loan to III. Kerület)
18	MF	HUN	Donát Varga (loan to Budafok)
24	MF	HUN	Róbert Rétyi (loan to Szentlőrinc)
28	GK	HUN	Dániel Bánfalvi (loan to Komárom)
32	MF	HUN	Botond Farkas (loan to Békéscsaba)

== Pre-season and friendlies ==
26 June 2021 Friendly	BVSC	1–5	Vasas	Budapest
10:00 CEST (UTC+2)	Zala 84'	Report	Szalai 63', 76'; Birtalan 72' (pen.); Rétyi 80'; Silye 89'	Stadium: Szőnyi úti Stadion; Attendance: 300; Referee: Áron Bodzay

30 June 2021 Friendly	Vasas (Hungary)	1–0	(Slovakia) Komárno	Budapest
17:00 CEST (UTC+2)	Márkvárt (yellow card) 2'; Radó 61' (pen.)	Report		Stadium: Fáy utcai Sportcentrum; Attendance: 250; Referee: Gábor Oláh (Hungary)

3 July 2021 Friendly	Budapest Honvéd	7–2	Vasas	Budapest
10:00 CEST (UTC+2)	Eppel 8'; Nono 14'; D. Nagy 22'; Lovrić 39'; Z. Szilágyi 62' (o.g.); Májer (yellow card) 85'; Banó-Szabó 112'; Traoré 119'	Report	Sztojka 4'; Szatmári 53'	Stadium: Magyar Futball Akadémia; Attendance: 300; Referee: Bálint Dolnegó
Note: (Note: The match consisted of two halves of 60 minutes each.)

9 July 2021 Friendly	DAC Dunajská Streda (Slovakia)	2–1	(Hungary) Vasas	Dunajská Streda, Slovakia
17:00 CEST (UTC+2)	Kružliak (yellow card) 14'; Nicolaescu 66'; Veselovský 109'	Report	Berecz (yellow card) 43'; Hinora 77'	Stadium: MOL Futball Akadémia; Attendance: 125; Referee: Peter Kralović (Slovakia)
Note:

14 July 2021 Friendly	Győr	0–3	Vasas	Győr
17:00 CEST (UTC+2)	Toma 51'; Kanalos 118'	Report	Balajti 33'; Birtalan 63'; Vukasović 83' (o.g.)	Stadium: ETO Park; Attendance: 0 Referee: Csaba Pintér
Note:

3 September 2021 Friendly	Vasas (Hungary)	0–1	(Ukraine) Mynai	Budapest
17:00 CEST (UTC+2)	Z. Szilágyi (yellow card) 104'; Pekár (yellow card) 107'	Report	Seleznyov 99'; Lykhovydko (yellow card) 109'	Stadium: Fáy utcai Sportcentrum; Referee: Péter Solymosi (Hungary)

== Competitions ==
=== Overview ===
Competition	First match	Last match	Starting round	Final position	Record							
Competition	First match	Last match	Starting round	Final position	Pld	W	D	L	GF	GA	GD	Win %
Nemzeti Bajnokság II	1 August 2021	22 May 2022	Matchday 1	Winners	38	25	10	3	80	22	+58	65.79
Magyar Kupa	18 September 2021	9 February 2022	Round of 64	Round of 16	3	2	0	1	4	3	+1	66.67
Total					41	27	10	4	84	25	+59	65.85

Source: Competitions

=== Nemzeti Bajnokság II ===
==== League table ====
Pos	Team	Pld	W	D	L	GF	GA	GD	Pts	Promotion or relegation
1	Vasas (P, C)	38	25	10	3	80	22	+58	85	Promotion to Nemzeti Bajnokság I
2	Kecskemét (P)	38	23	8	7	75	36	+39	77	Promotion to Nemzeti Bajnokság I
3	Diósgyőr	38	21	9	8	57	40	+17	72	
4	Szeged	38	19	9	10	64	34	+30	66	
5	Siófok	38	15	14	9	42	37	+5	59	

Source: MLSZ (in Hungarian), Soccerway
Rules for classification: 1) Points; 2) Head-to-head points; 3) Head-to-head goal difference; 4) Head-to-head goals scored; 5) Head-to-head away goals scored; 6) Goal difference; 7) Goals scored.
(C) Champions; (P) Promoted

==== Results summary ====
Overall								Home						Away					
Pld	W	D	L	GF	GA	GD	Pts	W	D	L	GF	GA	GD	W	D	L	GF	GA	GD
38	25	10	3	80	22	+58	85	14	5	0	44	10	+34	11	5	3	36	12	+24

Source: Soccerway

==== Results by round ====
Round	1	2	3	4	5	6	7	8	9	10	11	12	13	14	15	16	17	18	19	20	21	22	23	24	25	26	27	28	29	30	31	32	33	34	35	36	37	38
Ground	H	A	H	H	A	H	A	H	A	H	A	H	A	H	A	H	A	H	A	A	H	A	A	H	A	H	A	H	A	H	A	H	A	H	A	H	A	H
Result	W	L	W	W	D	H	W	W	L	W	W	W	D	W	L	W	W	D	W	D	D	W	D	D	W	W	W	W	W	W	W	W	W	W	D	W	W	D
Position	4	11	7	1	4	6	3	2	4	3	3	1	2	1	2	1	1	1	1	2	2	2	2	2	2	2	1	1	1	1	1	1	1	1	1	1	1	1

Source: Matches
A = Away; H = Home; W = Win; D = Draw; L = Loss

==== Matches ====
1 August 2021 1	Vasas	2–1	Ajka	Budapest
19:00 CEST (UTC+2)	Radó 22' (pen.); Berecz 28'; Sztojka (yellow card) 39'; Jova (yellow card) 72'; Otigba (yellow card) 90+3'	Report	Lehoczky (yellow card) 19'; Présinger 30'; Tar (yellow card) 50'; Tajthy (yellow card) 65'	Stadium: Illovszky Rudolf Stadion; Attendance: 1,150; Referee: Péter Antal

9 August 2021 2	Diósgyőr	2–1	Vasas	Miskolc
20:00 CEST (UTC+2)	Könyves 6'; Molnár (yellow card) 57', (goal) 76' (pen.); Eperjesi (yellow card) 83'; Zsemlye (red card) 90+3'	Report	Silye (yellow card) 31'; Rétyi (yellow card) 48'; Berecz (yellow card) 69', (goal) 72'; Márkvárt (yellow card) 75'	Stadium: DVTK Stadion; Attendance: 5,226; Referee: Sándor Andó-Szabó

15 August 2021 3	Vasas	2–1	Csákvár	Budapest
19:00 CEST (UTC+2)	Radó 19' (pen.), 50'; Sztojka (yellow card) 20'	Report	Kalmár (yellow card) 53'; Takács 60'; Magyar (yellow card) 69'	Stadium: Illovszky Rudolf Stadion; Attendance: 1,234; Referee: Szabolcs Szilasi

18 August 2021 4	Vasas	3–1	Budafok	Budapest
18:00 CEST (UTC+2)	Pátkai 9'; Szivacski 49'; Berecz (yellow card) 67'; Radó 80'	Report	Szalai (yellow card) 55'; Nándori (yellow card) 55'; Micsinai 81'	Stadium: Illovszky Rudolf Stadion; Attendance: 1,137; Referee: Márk Szigetvári

22 August 2021 5	Siófok	2–2	Vasas	Siófok
19:00 CEST (UTC+2)	Polényi (yellow card) 23'; Cipf 45', (yellow card) 52'; Varjas (yellow card) 46', (goal) 88'; Szakály (yellow card) 90+2'	Report	Radó 28'; Bobál (yellow card) 57'; Otigba (yellow card) 62'; Pekár 84'	Stadium: Révész Géza utcai Stadion; Attendance: 1,300; Referee: Marcell Derdák

29 August 2021 6	Vasas	1–1	Kecskemét	Budapest
19:00 CEST (UTC+2)	Pekár (yellow card) 55'; Berecz (yellow card) 79'; Pátkai 90+4'	Report	Nagy (yellow card) 26'; B. Tóth (yellow card) 28', (goal) 34'; Vágó (yellow card) 43'; Hadaró (yellow card) 55'; Belényesi (yellow card) 69'	Stadium: Illovszky Rudolf Stadion; Attendance: 1,317; Referee: Bence Csonka

12 September 2021 7	Szolnok	0–5	Vasas	Szolnok
17:00 CEST (UTC+2)	Gohér (yellow card) 15'; Irmes (yellow card) 35'; Tisza (yellow card) 52'; Berdó (yellow card) 62'	Report	Otigba 7'; Márkvárt (yellow card) 13'; Feczesin 16' (pen.); Silye 53'; Hinora (yellow card) 63', (goal) 77'; Berecz (yellow card) 86'; Sztojka (yellow card) 87', (goal) 88'	Stadium: Tiszaligeti Stadion; Attendance: 1,700; Referee: Ádám Pillók
Note: Csábi (yellow card) 23'

15 September 2021 8	Vasas	1–0	Pécs	Budapest
17:00 CEST (UTC+2)	Pátkai (yellow card) 40'; Berecz 71'	Report	Sági (yellow card) 28'; Preklet (red card) 59'; Króner (yellow card) 85'	Stadium: Illovszky Rudolf Stadion; Attendance: 870; Referee: Bence Hanyecz
Note: Vas (yellow card) 59'

26 September 2021 9	Győr	3–1	Vasas	Győr
19:30 CEST (UTC+2)	Bacsa (yellow card) 35', (goal) 70'; Toma (yellow card) 46'; Berki 63'; Óvári 82'	Report	Silye (yellow card) 28'; Pátkai (yellow card) 57'; Pekár 76'	Stadium: ETO Park; Attendance: 1,000; Referee: Gábor Oláh

29 September 2021 10	Vasas	2–0	Nyíregyháza	Budapest
17:00 CEST (UTC+2)	Pekár 8'; Feczesin 82'	Report	Sigér (yellow card) 18'; Zamostny (yellow card) 49'; Kilyén (yellow card) 53'; Paku (yellow card) 78'	Stadium: Illovszky Rudolf Stadion; Attendance: 980; Referee: Csaba Pintér

3 October 2021 11	Békéscsaba	0–3	Vasas	Békéscsaba
17:00 CEST (UTC+2)	P. Szabó (yellow card) 22'; Kitl (yellow card) 53'; Czinanó (yellow card) 64'	Report	Bobál 15'; Hinora (yellow card) 22'; Pekár (yellow card) 57'; Radó 65' (pen.); Otigba (yellow card) 77'; Pátkai 82'	Stadium: Kórház utcai Stadion; Attendance: 1,160; Referee: Márk Szigetvári

18 October 2021 12	Vasas	1–0	III. Kerület	Budapest
20:00 CEST (UTC+2)	Silye 14'; Otigba (red card) 77'; Pátkai (yellow card) 90'	Report	Rabatin (yellow card) 35'; Borvető (yellow card) 67'	Stadium: Illovszky Rudolf Stadion; Attendance: 1,131; Referee: Péter Zierkelbach

24 October 2021 13	Szeged	0–0	Vasas	Szeged
17:00 CEST (UTC+2)	Gajdos (yellow card) 28'	Report	Iyinbor (yellow card) 32'; Litauszki (yellow card) 78'	Stadium: Szent Gellért Fórum; Attendance: 3,000; Referee: Sándor Szilágyi

31 October 2021 14	Vasas	5–0	Dorog	Budapest
17:00 CET (UTC+1)	Feczesin 4', 71'; Pátkai 39'; Hinora 50'; Iyinbor 84'	Report	Csillag (yellow card) 15'; Oldal (yellow card) 22'	Stadium: Illovszky Rudolf Stadion; Attendance: 1,112; Referee: Péter Antal

7 November 2021 15	Tiszakécske	1–0	Vasas	Tiszakécske
13:00 CET (UTC+1)	Oláh (yellow card) 20'; Heffler 23'	Report	Otigba (yellow card) 84'; Pekár (yellow card) 86'	Stadium: Városi Stadion; Attendance: 500; Referee: Bálint Dolnegó

21 November 2021 16	Vasas	1–0	Haladás	Budapest
12:30 CET (UTC+1)	Pátkai 14'; Iyinbor (red card) 27'; Feczesin (yellow card) 68'; Litauszki (red card) 90+3'	Report	Mi. Tóth (yellow card) 68'; Németh (red card) 90+3'	Stadium: Illovszky Rudolf Stadion; Attendance: 1,476; Referee: István Vad

24 November 2021 17	Szentlőrinc	0–2	Vasas	Kozármisleny
13:00 CET (UTC+1)	Keresztes (yellow card) 35'	Report	Grumić 45' (o.g.); Feczesin 75'	Stadium: Városi Stadion; Attendance: 400; Referee: Szabolcs Szilasi
Note: Sluka (yellow card) 43'

28 November 2021 18	Vasas	1–1	Budaörs	Budapest
17:00 CET (UTC+1)	Pátkai 7'; Pekár (yellow card) 89'	Report	Pintér (yellow card) 58'; Gyurácz 79'; Slakta (yellow card) 87'; Zsidai (yellow card) 90'	Stadium: Illovszky Rudolf Stadion; Attendance: 805; Referee: Márió Görög

5 December 2021 19	Soroksár	1–2	Vasas	Budapest
17:00 CET (UTC+1)	Katona 52'; Csontos (yellow card) 75'; Pászka (yellow card) 84'	Report	Hinora 68'; Pekár (yellow card) 78'; Feczesin 82'; Berecz (yellow card) 85'; Rétyi (yellow card) 90+3'	Stadium: Mihály Szamosi Sporttelep; Attendance: 450; Referee: János Takács

12 December 2021 20	Ajka	2–2	Vasas	Ajka
17:00 CET (UTC+1)	Lehoczky 5'; Csizmadia 10'; Horváth (yellow card) 83'	Report	Szivacski (yellow card) 53'; Feczesin 66'; Tar 79' (o.g.)	Stadium: Városi Stadion; Attendance: 400; Referee: Marcell Derdák

31 January 2022 21	Vasas	0–0	Diósgyőr	Budapest
20:00 CET (UTC+1)	Berecz (yellow card) 26'; Litauszki (yellow card) 76'; Ihrig-Farkas (yellow card) 79'; Hidi (yellow card) 85'; Szivacski (yellow card) 89'	Report	Németh (yellow card) 35'; Oláh (yellow card) 44'; Bokros (yellow card) 89'	Stadium: Illovszky Rudolf Stadion; Attendance: 2,259; Referee: Tamás Bognár

6 February 2022 22	Csákvár	1–4	Vasas	Csákvár
17:00 CET (UTC+1)	Molnár 57'; Körmendi (yellow card) 77'	Report	Hidi (yellow card) 28'; Hinora 35'; Berecz (yellow card) 38'; Feczesin 43'; Ihrig-Farkas 51'; Silye (yellow card) 55'; Litauszki (yellow card) 63'; S. Szilágyi 75'	Stadium: Tersztyánszky Ödön Sportközpont; Attendance: 400; Referee: Péter Antal

13 February 2022 23	Budafok	0–0	Vasas	Budapest
17:00 CET (UTC+1)	Filkor (yellow card) 72'; Kotula (yellow card) 90+2'	Report	Hidi (yellow card) 71'	Stadium: Promontor utcai Stadion; Attendance: 700; Referee: Tamás Takács

21 February 2022 24	Vasas	0–0	Siófok	Budapest
20:00 CET (UTC+1)	Hinora (yellow card) 64'; Hidi (yellow card) 73'	Report	Deutsch (yellow card) 11'; Lorentz (yellow card) 43'; Polényi (yellow card) 81'; Hutvágner (yellow card) 90+3'	Stadium: Illovszky Rudolf Stadion; Attendance: 805; Referee: Marcell Derdák

28 February 2022 25	Kecskemét	0–1	Vasas	Kecskemét
20:00 CET (UTC+1)	Vágó (yellow card) 70'	Report	Hinora (yellow card) 13', (goal) 48'; Litauszki (yellow card) 21'; Iyinbor (yellow card) 90+3'	Stadium: Széktói Stadion; Attendance: 700; Referee: Ádám Pillók

6 March 2022 26	Vasas	3–0	Szolnok	Budapest
17:00 CET (UTC+1)	Berecz 12'; Radó 31'; Pátkai (yellow card) 45'; Litauszki (yellow card) 72'; Zimonyi 77'; Cipf (yellow card) 90+1'	Report	Szekszárdi (yellow card) 75'; Hleba (yellow card) 84'	Stadium: Illovszky Rudolf Stadion; Attendance: 780; Referee: Zoltán Kovács J.

9 March 2022 27	Pécs	0–1	Vasas	Pécs
18:00 CET (UTC+1)	Zsemlye (yellow card) 45'; Katona (red card) 54'; Adamcsek (yellow card) 57'; Preklet (yellow card) 79'	Report	Ihrig-Farkas (yellow card) 39'; Radó 68'; Zimonyi (yellow card) 81'	Stadium: Stadion PMFC; Attendance: 2,000; Referee: Attila Molnár

13 March 2022 28	Vasas	2–0	Győr	Budapest
19:30 CET (UTC+1)	Kiss 72' (o.g.); Pátkai (yellow card) 73'; Iyinbor (yellow card) 82'; Feczesin 89'	Report	Toma (yellow card) 66'; Fodor (yellow card) 86'	Stadium: Illovszky Rudolf Stadion; Attendance: 1,063; Referee: Ádám Radványi

20 March 2022 29	Nyíregyháza	0–1	Vasas	Balmazújváros
14:00 CET (UTC+1)	Szabó (yellow card) 36'; Zamostny (yellow card) 49'	Report	Berecz (yellow card) 45'; Otigba 75'; Márkvárt (yellow card) 86'	Stadium: Balmazújvárosi Városi Sportpálya; Attendance: 600; Referee: Péter Antal

3 April 2022 30	Vasas	6–0	Békéscsaba	Budapest
17:00 CEST (UTC+2)	Ihrig-Farkas 12', 53', 86'; Feczesin 15'; Szivacski (yellow card) 67'; Zimonyi 77'; S. Szilágyi 90'	Report	Váradi (yellow card) 74'; Mikló (red card) 82'	Stadium: Illovszky Rudolf Stadion; Attendance: 980; Referee: Péter Zierkelbach

6 April 2022 31	III. Kerület	0–3	Vasas	Budapest
16:00 CEST (UTC+2)		Report	Radó 59', 77'; Pekár 90+3'	Stadium: Hévízi úti Stadion; Attendance: 800; Referee: József Ducsai

11 April 2022 32	Vasas	3–1	Szeged	Budapest
20:00 CEST (UTC+2)	Silye 58'; Hinora 62'; Otigba 69'; Feczesin (yellow card) 78'	Report	Horváth 13'; Ódor (yellow card) 39'; Simon (yellow card) 51'; Csoboth (yellow card) 64'; Gajdos (yellow card) 64'	Stadium: Illovszky Rudolf Stadion; Attendance: 1,476; Referee: Tamás Bognár

17 April 2022 33	Dorog	0–3	Vasas	Dorog
17:00 CEST (UTC+2)	Keresztes (yellow card) 15'	Report	Pátkai 27'; Feczesin 53'; Berecz (yellow card) 61'; Cipf 63'	Stadium: Buzánszky Jenő Stadion; Attendance: 800; Referee: Márió Görög

24 April 2022 34	Vasas	4–0	Tiszakécske	Budapest
17:00 CEST (UTC+2)	Feczesin 15' (pen.); Radó 19'; Cipf 44'; Szalai 64'	Report	Farkas (yellow card) 14'; Vachtler (yellow card) 25'; Pongrácz (yellow card) 38'; Csősz (yellow card) 75'	Stadium: Illovszky Rudolf Stadion; Attendance: 1,699; Referee: Bence Hanyecz

2 May 2022 35	Haladás	0–0	Vasas	Szombathely
20:00 CEST (UTC+2)	Doktorics (yellow card) 72'; Németh (yellow card) 73'; Bošnjak (yellow card) 76'	Report	Otigba (yellow card) 22'; Iyinbor (yellow card) 55'; Szivacski (yellow card) 86'	Stadium: Haladás Sportkomplexum; Attendance: 1,731; Referee: Mihály Káprály

8 May 2022 36	Vasas	4–1	Szentlőrinc	Budapest
17:00 CEST (UTC+2)	Litauszki 42'; Cipf (yellow card) 54', (goal) 74'; Feczesin 83'; Silye 89'	Report	Grumić (yellow card) 49'; Szabó (yellow card) 59'; Harsányi 70'; Rétyi (yellow card) 75'; Drljo (yellow card) 90+1'	Stadium: Illovszky Rudolf Stadion; Attendance: 1,675; Referee: Gergely Szőts

15 May 2022 37	Budaörs	0–5	Vasas	Budaörs
17:00 CEST (UTC+2)		Report	Radó 4', 22'; Otigba 31'; Hinora 46'; Pátkai 82', (yellow card) 87'	Stadium: Városi Stadion; Attendance: 1,600; Referee: Róbert Nagy

22 May 2022 38	Vasas	3–3	Soroksár	Budapest
15:30 CEST (UTC+2)	Feczesin 29', 57'; Szivacski (yellow card) 55'; Radó 69'; Iyinbor (yellow card) 77'	Report	Lovrencsics 7', 18'; Lőrinczy 14', (yellow card) 16'; Ternován (yellow card) 50'	Stadium: Illovszky Rudolf Stadion; Attendance: 3,065; Referee: Gábor Oláh

=== Magyar Kupa ===
18 September 2021 Round of 64	Budaörs	1–3	Vasas	Budaörs
15:00 CEST (UTC+2)	Molnár 54' (pen.)	Report	Radó 43'; Hidi 47'; Hinora 56'	Stadium: Árok utcai Stadion; Attendance: 1,100; Referee: Róbert Nagy

27 October 2021 Round of 32	Jászberény	0–1	Vasas	Jászberény
13:30 CEST (UTC+2)	Aranyos (yellow card) 32'	Report	Balajti 39'	Stadium: Városi Stadion; Attendance: 500; Referee: János Takács

9 February 2022 Round of 16	Vasas	0–2	Ferencváros	Budapest
20:00 CET (UTC+1)	Z. Szilágyi (yellow card) 52'; Hinora (yellow card) 69'; Berecz (yellow card) 89'	Report	Botka 9', (yellow card) 75'; R. Mmaee 73'	Stadium: Illovszky Rudolf Stadion; Attendance: 4,011; Referee: Mihály Káprály

=== Appearances and goals ===
No.	Pos	Nat	Player	Total		Nemzeti Bajnokság II		Magyar Kupa	
No.	Pos	Nat	Player	Apps	Goals	Apps	Goals	Apps	Goals
2	DF	(Hungary) HUN	Donát Szivacski	39	1	37	1	2	0
4	DF	(Hungary) HUN	Zoltán Szilágyi	11	0	8	0	3	0
5	DF	(Hungary) HUN	Róbert Litauszki	18	1	16	1	2	0
6	FW	(Hungary) HUN	Botond Birtalan	3	0	3	0	0	0
8	MF	(Hungary) HUN	Sebestyén Ihrig-Farkas	13	4	12	4	1	0
9	FW	(Hungary) HUN	Róbert Feczesin	35	15	34	15	1	0
10	MF	(Hungary) HUN	Lóránd Szatmári	6	0	4	0	2	0
13	MF	(Hungary) HUN	Zsombor Berecz	40	4	37	4	3	0
14	MF	(Hungary) HUN	Dávid Márkvárt	36	0	34	0	2	0
15	MF	(Hungary) HUN	Sándor Hidi	27	1	24	0	3	1
16	DF	(Hungary) HUN	Péter Kiss-Szemán	0	0	0	0	0	0
17	MF	(Hungary) HUN	Kristóf Hinora	36	8	34	7	2	1
19	MF	(Hungary) HUN	Ákos Kapornai	5	0	4	0	1	0
21	MF	(Hungary) HUN	Máté Pátkai	36	8	34	8	2	0
23	MF	(Hungary) HUN	Máté Vida	2	0	2	0	0	0
24	MF	(Hungary) HUN	Róbert Rétyi	11	0	9	0	2	0
25	DF	(Hungary) HUN	Ádám Viczián	7	0	6	0	1	0
26	GK	(Hungary) HUN	János Uram	6	0	3	0	3	0
29	DF	(Hungary) HUN	Botond Terbe	8	0	6	0	2	0
30	MF	(Romania) ROU	Szabolcs Szilágyi	22	2	19	2	3	0
33	FW	(Hungary) HUN	Ádám Balajti	7	1	5	0	2	1
34	DF	(Hungary) HUN	Kenneth Otigba	26	4	25	4	1	0
55	GK	(Hungary) HUN	Levente Jova	35	0	35	0	0	0
57	DF	(Hungary) HUN	Patrick Iyinbor	31	1	30	1	1	0
58	DF	(Hungary) HUN	Erik Silye	38	4	37	4	1	0
66	MF	(Hungary) HUN	Dominik Sztojka	12	1	10	1	2	0
67	FW	(Hungary) HUN	Dominik Cipf	12	3	11	3	1	0
70	FW	(Hungary) HUN	András Radó	39	15	38	14	1	1
71	FW	(Hungary) HUN	Gergely Bobál	20	1	18	1	2	0
77	MF	(Hungary) HUN	László Pekár	28	4	27	4	1	0
97	FW	(Hungary) HUN	Dávid Zimonyi	12	2	12	2	0	0
99	MF	(Hungary) HUN	József Szalai	6	1	5	1	1	0
Youth players:
18	MF	(Hungary) HUN	Donát Varga	0	0	0	0	0	0
22	MF	(Hungary) HUN	Bálint Faragó	0	0	0	0	0	0
32	MF	(Hungary) HUN	Botond Farkas	0	0	0	0	0	0
42	GK	(Hungary) HUN	Kornél Horváth	0	0	0	0	0	0
47	DF	(Hungary) HUN	Máté Bonifert	0	0	0	0	0	0
88	GK	(Hungary) HUN	Zsombor Molnár	0	0	0	0	0	0
Out to loan:
Players no longer at the club:

=== Top scorers ===
Includes all competitive matches. The list is sorted by shirt number when total goals are equal.

Position	Nation	Number	Name	Nemzeti Bajnokság II	Magyar Kupa	Total
1	(Hungary)	9	Róbert Feczesin	15	0	15
1	(Hungary)	70	András Radó	14	1	15
3	(Hungary)	17	Kristóf Hinora	7	1	8
3	(Hungary)	21	Máté Pátkai	8	0	8
5	(Hungary)	8	Sebestyén Ihrig-Farkas	4	0	4
5	(Hungary)	13	Zsombor Berecz	4	0	4
5	(Hungary)	34	Kenneth Otigba	4	0	4
5	(Hungary)	58	Erik Silye	4	0	4
5	(Hungary)	77	László Pekár	4	0	4
10	(Hungary)	67	Dominik Cipf	3	0	3
11	(Romania)	30	Szabolcs Szilágyi	2	0	2
11	(Hungary)	97	Dávid Zimonyi	2	0	2
13	(Hungary)	2	Donát Szivacski	1	0	1
13	(Hungary)	5	Róbert Litauszki	1	0	1
13	(Hungary)	15	Sándor Hidi	0	1	1
13	(Hungary)	33	Ádám Balajti	0	1	1
13	(Hungary)	57	Patrick Iyinbor	1	0	1
13	(Hungary)	66	Dominik Sztojka	1	0	1
13	(Hungary)	71	Gergely Bobál	1	0	1
13	(Hungary)	99	József Szalai	1	0	1
/	/	/	Own Goals	3	0	3
			TOTALS	80	4	84

=== Hat-tricks ===
Player	Against	Result	Date	Competition	Round
(Hungary) Sebestyén Ihrig-Farkas	Békéscsaba	6–0 (H)	3 April 2022	Nemzeti Bajnokság II	30

=== Disciplinary record ===
Includes all competitive matches. Players with 1 card or more included only.

Position	Nation	Number	Name	Nemzeti Bajnokság II		Magyar Kupa		Total (Hu Total)	
Position	Nation	Number	Name	Yellow card	Red card	Yellow card	Red card	Yellow card	Red card
DF	(Hungary)	2	Donát Szivacski	5	0	0	0	5 (5)	0 (0)
DF	(Hungary)	4	Zoltán Szilágyi	0	0	1	0	1 (0)	0 (0)
DF	(Hungary)	5	Róbert Litauszki	5	1	0	0	5 (5)	1 (1)
MF	(Hungary)	8	Sebestyén Ihrig-Farkas	2	0	0	0	2 (2)	0 (0)
FW	(Hungary)	9	Róbert Feczesin	2	0	0	0	2 (2)	0 (0)
MF	(Hungary)	13	Zsombor Berecz	9	0	1	0	10 (9)	0 (0)
MF	(Hungary)	14	Dávid Márkvárt	3	0	0	0	3 (3)	0 (0)
MF	(Hungary)	15	Sándor Hidi	4	0	0	0	4 (4)	0 (0)
MF	(Hungary)	17	Kristóf Hinora	4	0	1	0	5 (4)	0 (0)
MF	(Hungary)	21	Máté Pátkai	6	0	0	0	6 (6)	0 (0)
MF	(Hungary)	24	Róbert Rétyi	2	0	0	0	2 (2)	0 (0)
DF	(Hungary)	34	Kenneth Otigba	5	1	0	0	5 (5)	1 (1)
GK	(Hungary)	55	Levente Jova	1	0	0	0	1 (1)	0 (0)
DF	(Hungary)	57	Patrick Iyinbor	5	1	0	0	5 (5)	1 (1)
DF	(Hungary)	58	Erik Silye	3	0	0	0	3 (3)	0 (0)
FW	(Hungary)	67	Dominik Cipf	2	0	0	0	2 (2)	0 (0)
MF	(Hungary)	66	Dominik Sztojka	3	0	0	0	3 (3)	0 (0)
FW	(Hungary)	71	Gergely Bobál	1	0	0	0	1 (1)	0 (0)
MF	(Hungary)	77	László Pekár	5	0	0	0	5 (5)	0 (0)
FW	(Hungary)	97	Dávid Zimonyi	1	0	0	0	1 (1)	0 (0)
			TOTALS	68	3	3	0	71 (68)	3 (3)

=== Clean sheets ===
Position	Nation	Number	Name	Nemzeti Bajnokság II	Magyar Kupa	Total
1	(Hungary)	55	Levente Jova	23	0	23
2	(Hungary)	26	János Uram	0	1	1
3	(Hungary)	42	Kornél Horváth	0	0	0
4	(Hungary)	88	Zsombor Molnár	0	0	0
			TOTALS	23	1	24
