= 2022–23 Vasas FC season =

Vasas
2022–23 season
- Chairman: László Markovits
- Manager: Attila Kuttor (until 6 September); Elemér Kondás (from 6 September to 5 April); Szilárd Desits (from 5 April)
- Nemzeti Bajnokság I: 12th (relegated)
- Magyar Kupa: Semi-finals
- Top goalscorer: League: Filip Holender (8); All: Filip Holender (8)
- Highest home attendance: 4,295 vs Ferencváros (31 August 2022); Nemzeti Bajnokság I
- Lowest home attendance: 1,200 vs Budapest Honvéd (7 February 2023); Magyar Kupa
- Average home league attendance: 2,210
- Biggest win: 2–0 vs Fehérvár (H) (15 October 2022); Nemzeti Bajnokság I 2–0 vs Budapest Honvéd (H) (7 February 2023); Magyar Kupa
- Biggest defeat: 0–3 vs Debrecen (H) (6 November 2022); Nemzeti Bajnokság I
Home colours	Away colours
- All statistics correct as of 13 March 2023.

The 2022–23 season is Vasas Sport Club's 88th competitive season, 1st consecutive season in the Nemzeti Bajnokság I and 111st year in existence as a football club. In addition to the domestic league, Vasas participated in this season's editions of the Magyar Kupa.

== Transfers ==
=== Summer ===
In: Note: Flags indicate national team as defined under FIFA eligibility rules; some limited exceptions apply. Players may hold more than one non-FIFA nationality.

No.	Pos.	Nation	Player
—	LW	HUN	Filip Holender (from (Serbia) Partizan Belgrade)
—	GK	HUN	Dávid Dombó (from Kisvárda)
—	FW	HUN	Soma Novothny (from (Cyprus) Anorthosis)
—	DF	HUN	Botond Baráth (from Budapest Honvéd)
—	LW	HUN	Krisztián Géresi (from Fehérvár)
—	DF	HUN	László Deutsch (from Puskás Akadémia)
—	DF	HUN	Máté Ódor (from Szeged)
—	MF	HUN	Patrik Hidi (from Budapest Honvéd)
—	FW	HUN	Dávid Zimonyi (from Zalaegerszeg)
—	DF	HUN	Patrick Iyinbor (loan from Ferencváros)
—	MF	HUN	Milán Kovács (loan return from Szeged)
—	RW	HUN	Richárd Vernes (loan return from Győr)
—	MF	HUN	Milán Kovács (loan return from Szeged)
—	DF	HUN	Bence Tóth (loan return from Szolnok)
—	FW	HUN	Botond Birtalan (loan return from III. Kerület)
—	MF	HUN	Márk Kleisz (loan return from III. Kerület)
—	RW	HUN	Benedek Murka (loan return from Ajka)

Out: Note: Flags indicate national team as defined under FIFA eligibility rules; some limited exceptions apply. Players may hold more than one non-FIFA nationality.

No.	Pos.	Nation	Player
—	DF	HUN	Ádám Viczián (to Diósgyőr)
—	MF	HUN	Lóránd Szatmári (to Szeged)
—	RW	HUN	Benedek Murka (to Csákvár)
—	DF	HUN	Péter Kiss-Szemán (to Szentlőrinc)
—	DF	HUN	Bence Tóth (to Szeged)
—	DF	HUN	Botond Terbe (to Pécs)
—	DF	HUN	Zoltán Szilágyi (to Szeged)
—	FW	HUN	Ádám Balajti (loan to Tiszakécske)
—	FW	HUN	Gergely Bobál (loan to Mezőkövesd)
—	GK	HUN	Zsombor Molnár (loan to Dorog)
—	MF	HUN	László Pekár
—	RW	HUN	Richárd Vernes

=== Winter ===
In: Note: Flags indicate national team as defined under FIFA eligibility rules; some limited exceptions apply. Players may hold more than one non-FIFA nationality.

No.	Pos.	Nation	Player
—	DF	HUN	János Hegedűs (from Diósgyőr)
—	FW	HUN	Norbert Balogh (loan from (Slovakia) Dunajská Streda)
—	DF	HUN	Ádám Újvárosi (loan return from Debreceni EAC)
—	FW	HUN	Donát Varga (loan return from Budafok)

Out: Note: Flags indicate national team as defined under FIFA eligibility rules; some limited exceptions apply. Players may hold more than one non-FIFA nationality.

No.	Pos.	Nation	Player
7	FW	HUN	Krisztián Géresi (loan to Szeged)
—	DF	HUN	Ádám Újvárosi (to Debreceni EAC)

== Competitions ==
=== Overview ===
Competition	First match	Last match	Starting round	Final position	Record							
Competition	First match	Last match	Starting round	Final position	Pld	W	D	L	GF	GA	GD	Win %
Nemzeti Bajnokság I	30 July 2022	27 May 2023	Matchday 1	12th	33	4	14	15	29	43	−14	12.12
Magyar Kupa	17 September 2022	5 April 2023	Round of 64	Semi-finals	5	4	0	1	9	7	+2	80.00
Total					38	8	14	16	38	50	−12	21.05

Source: Competitions

=== Nemzeti Bajnokság I ===
==== League table ====
Pos	Team	Pld	W	D	L	GF	GA	GD	Pts	Qualification or relegation
8	Újpest	33	11	8	14	42	55	−13	41	
9	Zalaegerszeg	33	10	9	14	37	43	−6	39	Qualification for the Europa Conference League second qualifying round (Note: Zalaegerszeg qualified to the Europa Conference League second qualifying round as winners of the 2022–23 Magyar Kupa.)
10	Fehérvár	33	8	11	14	38	43	−5	35	
11	Budapest Honvéd (R)	33	8	9	16	34	51	−17	33	Relegation to the Nemzeti Bajnokság II
12	Vasas (R)	33	4	14	15	29	43	−14	26	Relegation to the Nemzeti Bajnokság II

Source: Hungarian Football Federation (in Hungarian), Soccerway
Rules for classification: 1) Points; 2) Matches won; 3) Goal difference; 4) Goals scored; 5) Head-to-head points; 6) Head-to-head goal difference; 7) Fair play ranking; 8) Drawing of lots.
(R) Relegated

==== Results summary ====
Overall								Home						Away					
Pld	W	D	L	GF	GA	GD	Pts	W	D	L	GF	GA	GD	W	D	L	GF	GA	GD
33	4	14	15	29	43	−14	26	2	7	8	16	23	−7	2	7	7	13	20	−7

Source: Soccerway

==== Results by round ====
Round	1	2	3	4	5	6	7	8	9	10	11	12	13	14	15	16	17	18	19	20	21	22	23	24	25	26	27	28	29	30	31	32	33
Ground	A	H	A	H	A	H	H	A	H	A	H	H	A	H	A	H	A	A	H	A	H	A	A	H	A	H	A	H	H	A	H	A	H
Result	D	D	D	L	D	L	D	L	D	L	W	L	W	L	L	W	D	D	L	D	D	L	L	L	L	L	W	L	D	D	D	L	D
Position	9	8	9	11	10	11	12	12	11	12	12	12	12	12	12	12	12	12	12	12	12	12	12	12	12	12	12	12	12	12	12	12	12

Source: Matches
A = Away; H = Home; W = Win; D = Draw; L = Loss

==== Matches ====
30 July 2022 1	Kecskemét	0–0	Vasas	Kecskemét
17:45 CEST (UTC+2)	Sági (yellow card) 16' (yellow-red card) 40'	Report		Stadium: Széktói Stadion; Attendance: 2,527; Referee: József Erdős

5 August 2022 2	Vasas	2–2	Paks	Budapest
20:00 CEST (UTC+2)	Holender 37'; Radó 45'	Report	B. Szabó 8'; Haraszti 48'	Stadium: Illovszky Rudolf Stadion; Attendance: 2,429; Referee: Ádám Pillók

12 August 2022 3	Debrecen	1–1	Vasas	Debrecen
20:00 CEST (UTC+2)	Do. Babunski 86'	Report	Berecz 21'; Baráth (red card) 29'	Stadium: Nagyerdei Stadion; Attendance: 5,665; Referee: Gergő Bogár

21 August 2022 4	Vasas	1–2	Budapest Honvéd	Budapest
20:00 CEST (UTC+2)	Hidi 11'	Report	Ennin 33'; Lukić 65'	Stadium: Illovszky Rudolf Stadion; Attendance: 2,966; Referee: Tamás Bognár

27 August 2022 5	Mezőkövesd	1–1	Vasas	Mezőkövesd
15:30 CEST (UTC+2)	Pillár 44'	Report	Holender 24'	Stadium: Mezőkövesdi Városi Stadion; Attendance: 1,894; Referee: Ádám Farkas

31 August 2022 6	Vasas	0–1	Ferencváros	Budapest
20:30 CEST (UTC+2)		Report	Zachariassen 17'	Stadium: Illovszky Rudolf Stadion; Attendance: 4,295; Referee: Sándor Andó-Szabó

3 September 2022 7	Vasas	1–1	Puskás Akadémia	Budapest
16:15 CEST (UTC+2)	Holender 28'	Report	Zahedi 56'	Stadium: Illovszky Rudolf Stadion; Attendance: 1,778; Referee: Gergő Bogár

11 September 2022 8	Újpest	2–1	Vasas	Budapest
20:00 CEST (UTC+2)	Katona 11'; Diaby 69'	Report	Holender 20'	Stadium: Szusza Ferenc Stadion; Attendance: 2,444; Referee: Ferenc Karakó

1 October 2022 9	Vasas	1–1	Zalaegerszeg	Budapest
19:30 CEST (UTC+2)	Holender 44'	Report	Lesjak 53'	Stadium: Illovszky Rudolf Stadion; Attendance: 1,770; Referee: Sándor Andó-Szabó

8 October 2022 10	Kisvárda	2–0	Vasas	Kisvárda
17:00 CEST (UTC+2)	Baráth 17' (o.g.); Makowski 38'	Report	Szivacski (red card) 27'	Stadium: Várkerti Stadion; Attendance: 2,403; Referee: Gergő Bogár

15 October 2022 11	Vasas	2–0	Fehérvár	Budapest
19:30 CEST (UTC+2)	Novothny 36'; Ihrig-Farkas 83'	Report	Serafimov (red card) 71'	Stadium: Illovszky Rudolf Stadion; Attendance: 2,027; Referee: Balázs Berke

21 October 2022 12	Vasas	1–2	Kecskemét	Budapest
20:00 CEST (UTC+2)	Cipf 47'	Report	Vágó 35'; Zeke 40'	Stadium: Illovszky Rudolf Stadion; Attendance: 2,022; Referee: Ádám Farkas

29 October 2022 13	Paks	0–1	Vasas	Paks
19:30 CEST (UTC+2)		Report	Novothny 2'	Stadium: Fehérvári úti Stadion; Attendance: 1,528; Referee: Csaba Pintér

6 November 2022 14	Vasas	0–3	Debrecen	Budapest
15:15 CET (UTC+1)		Report	Dzsudzsák 10'; Szécsi 17'; Babunski 38'	Stadium: Illovszky Rudolf Stadion; Attendance: 2,654; Referee: István Vad

10 November 2022 15	Budapest Honvéd	2–0	Vasas	Budapest
19:00 CET (UTC+1)	Lukić 84', 88'	Report		Stadium: Bozsik Aréna; Attendance: 2,389; Referee: Ferenc Karakó

13 November 2022 16	Vasas	1–0	Mezőkövesd	Budapest
18:00 CET (UTC+1)	Novothny 14'	Report		Stadium: Illovszky Rudolf Stadion; Attendance: 1,328; Referee: Balázs Berke

28 January 2023 17	Ferencváros	0–0	Vasas	Budapest
19:30 CET (UTC+1)		Report		Stadium: Groupama Arena; Attendance: 8,579; Referee: Gergő Bogár

3 February 2023 18	Puskás Akadémia	1–1	Vasas	Felcsút
20:00 CET (UTC+1)	Slagveer 13'	Report	Berecz 57'	Stadium: Pancho Aréna; Attendance: 500; Referee: István Vad

12 February 2023 19	Vasas	0–1	Újpest	Budapest
17:30 CET (UTC+1)		Report	Csoboth 47'; Hámori (red card) 90+7'	Stadium: Illovszky Rudolf Stadion; Attendance: 1,700; Referee: Csaba Pintér

19 February 2023 20	Zalaegerszeg	0–0	Vasas	Zalaegerszeg
15:00 CET (UTC+1)		Report		Stadium: ZTE Arena; Attendance: 2,324; Referee: Gergő Bogár

25 February 2023 21	Vasas	2–2	Kisvárda	Budapest
19:30 CET (UTC+1)	Hidi 18'; Feczesin 90'	Report	Mešanović 31'; Hegedűs 75' (o.g.)	Stadium: Illovszky Rudolf Stadion; Attendance: 1,350; Referee: Balázs Berke

4 March 2023 22	Fehérvár	2–1	Vasas	Székesfehérvár
20:15 CET (UTC+1)	Schön 15'; Kodro 78'	Report	Urblík 28'	Stadium: MOL Aréna Sóstó; Attendance: 2,563; Referee: József Erdős

12 March 2023 23	Kecskemét	2–0	Vasas	Kecskemét
14:05 CET (UTC+1)	B. Tóth 59'; Banó-Szabó 85'	Report		Stadium: Széktói Stadion; Attendance: 3,223; Referee: Ádám Farkas

19 March 2023 24	Vasas	2–3	Paks	Budapest
13:30 CET (UTC+1)	Szivacski (yellow card) 15'; Otigba (yellow card) 22'; Holender 80'; Berecz 90'	Report	Papp (yellow card) 21'; Hahn 24'; Böde 55', 73'	Stadium: Illovszky Rudolf Stadion; Attendance: 1,595; Referee: Tamás Bognár

2 April 2023 25	Debrecen	3–1	Vasas	Debrecen
19:00 CEST (UTC+2)	Varga 34', 49'; Mance 44'; Manrique (yellow card) 72'	Report	Berecz 73' (pen.), (yellow card) 85'	Stadium: Nagyerdei Stadion; Attendance: 3,379; Referee: Csaba Pintér

9 April 2023 26	Vasas	0–1	Budapest Honvéd	Budapest
14:15 CEST (UTC+2)	Otigba (yellow card) 16'; Iyinbor (yellow card) 75'; Holender (yellow card) 77'; Balogh (yellow card) 90+1'	Report	Lovrić (yellow card) 37'; Lukić 85'	Stadium: Illovszky Rudolf Stadion; Attendance: 1,984; Referee: Balázs Berke

15 April 2023 27	Mezőkövesd	1–4	Vasas	Mezőkövesd
17:00 CEST (UTC+2)	Babunski 11' (pen.); Lukić (yellow card) 25'; Karnitsky (yellow card) 35'; Ephestion (yellow card) 89'	Report	Berecz (yellow card) 9'; Otigba (yellow card) 28', (goal) 88'; Novothny 39', 41'; Holender 71'; Szivacski (yellow card) 89'	Stadium: Városi Stadion; Attendance: 1,850; Referee: Gergő Bogár

22 April 2023 28	Vasas	0–1	Ferencváros	Budapest
19:30 CEST (UTC+2)	Holender (yellow card) 30'; Urblík (yellow card) 70'; Ihrig-Farkas (yellow card) 90+5'	Report	Kovačević (yellow card) 32'; Lisztes 79'	Stadium: Illovszky Rudolf Stadion; Attendance: 3,718; Referee: József Erdős

29 April 2023 29	Vasas	2–2	Puskás Akadémia	Budapest
19:30 CEST (UTC+2)	Szivacski (yellow card) 31'; Urblík (yellow card) 42', (goal) 73', 88'	Report	Favorov 50', (yellow card) 87'; Golla (yellow card) 86'; Komáromi 90'; Batik (yellow card) 90+2'	Stadium: Illovszky Rudolf Stadion; Attendance: 1,458; Referee: Péter Antal

6 May 2023 30	Újpest	1–1	Vasas	Budapest
14:00 CEST (UTC+2)	Antzoulas 42'	Report	Urblík (yellow card) 26'; Holender (yellow card) 31', (goal) 37'; Novothny (yellow card) 50'; Berecz (yellow card) 90+3'	Stadium: Szusza Ferenc Stadion; Attendance: 3,880; Referee: Ferenc Karakó

13 May 2023 31	Vasas	1–1	Zalaegerszeg	Budapest
14:15 CEST (UTC+2)	Berecz (yellow card) 28'; Hinora 63'	Report	D. Németh 6'; Gergényi (yellow card) 84'	Stadium: Illovszky Rudolf Stadion; Attendance: 1,376; Referee: Mihály Káprály

19 May 2023 32	Kisvárda	2–1	Vasas	Kisvárda
20:30 CEST (UTC+2)	Mešanović 45+5' (pen.); Leoni 46', (yellow card) 78'; Karabelyov (yellow card) 51'	Report	Iyinbor (yellow card) 10'; Szilágyi (yellow card) 28'; Berecz 39'; Szivacski (yellow card) 45+4'; Novothny (yellow card) 49'; Sztojka (yellow card) 87'	Stadium: Várkerti Stadion; Attendance: 2,380; Referee: Sándor Andó-Szabó

27 May 2023 33	Vasas	0–0	Fehérvár	Budapest
20:00 CEST (UTC+2)	Novothny (yellow card) 45'; Ódor (yellow card) 51'; Berecz (yellow card) 54'	Report	Flores (yellow card) 11'; Schön (yellow card) 39'	Stadium: Illovszky Rudolf Stadion; Attendance: 2,305; Referee: Balázs Berke

=== Magyar Kupa ===
17 September 2022 Round of 64	Balassagyarmat	1–2	Vasas	Balassagyarmat
15:00 CEST (UTC+2)	Bartos 28' (pen.)	Report	Ihrig-Farkas 13'; Novothny 86'	Stadium: Kövi Pál Sportközpont; Attendance: 700; Referee: Tamás Nazsa

18 October 2022 Round of 32	Nyíregyháza	1–2	Vasas	Sényő
13:30 CEST (UTC+2)	Gresó 60'	Report	Zimonyi 42'; Otigba 81'	Stadium: Sényő Sporttelep; Attendance: 344; Referee: Imre Kovács

7 February 2023 Round of 16	Vasas	2–0	Budapest Honvéd	Budapest
19:00 CET (UTC+1)	Zimonyi 22'; Hinora 90+2'	Report	Prenga (red card) 90+3'	Stadium: Illovszky Rudolf Stadion; Attendance: 1,200; Referee: Sándor Andó-Szabó

1 March 2023 Quarter-finals	Paks	2–3	Vasas	Paks
20:00 CET (UTC+1)	Varga 19'; Böde 64'	Report	Silye 3'; Iyinbor 16'; Berecz 52' (pen.)	Stadium: Fehérvári úti Stadion; Attendance: 1,312; Referee: Péter Antal

5 April 2023 Semi-finals	Budafok	3–0	Vasas	Budapest
20:00 CEST (UTC+2)	Soltész (yellow card) 10'; Beke 22', 34', 39'; Gundel-Takács (yellow card) 80'; Fótyik (yellow card) 84'	Report	Litauszki (yellow card) 5'; Ihrig-Farkas (yellow card) 84'	Stadium: Promontor utcai Stadion; Attendance: 2,450; Referee: Ádám Farkas

== Statistics ==
=== Appearances and goals ===
Last updated on 13 March 2023.

No.	Pos	Nat	Player	Total		Nemzeti Bajnokság I		Magyar Kupa	
No.	Pos	Nat	Player	Apps	Goals	Apps	Goals	Apps	Goals
2	DF	(Hungary) HUN	Donát Szivacski	21	0	17	0	4	0
5	DF	(Hungary) HUN	Róbert Litauszki	11	0	8	0	3	0
6	MF	(Hungary) HUN	Patrik Hidi	26	2	23	2	3	0
8	MF	(Hungary) HUN	Sebestyén Ihrig-Farkas	13	2	10	1	3	1
9	FW	(Hungary) HUN	Róbert Feczesin	8	1	8	1	0	0
10	FW	(Hungary) HUN	Filip Holender	24	5	21	5	3	0
13	MF	(Hungary) HUN	Zsombor Berecz	25	3	21	2	4	1
14	MF	(Hungary) HUN	Dávid Márkvárt	17	0	14	0	3	0
15	MF	(Hungary) HUN	Sándor Hidi	11	0	9	0	2	0
17	MF	(Hungary) HUN	Kristóf Hinora	23	1	20	0	3	1
20	DF	(Hungary) HUN	Máté Ódor	14	0	11	0	3	0
21	MF	(Hungary) HUN	Máté Pátkai	6	0	6	0	0	0
23	MF	(Hungary) HUN	Máté Vida	7	0	5	0	2	0
26	GK	(Hungary) HUN	János Uram	7	-8	7	-8	0	-0
30	MF	(Romania) ROU	Szabolcs Szilágyi	8	0	7	0	1	0
34	DF	(Hungary) HUN	Kenneth Otigba	20	1	18	0	2	1
36	DF	(Hungary) HUN	Botond Baráth	15	0	15	0	0	0
55	GK	(Hungary) HUN	Levente Jova	12	-15	12	-15	0	-0
57	DF	(Hungary) HUN	Patrick Iyinbor	19	1	17	0	2	1
58	DF	(Hungary) HUN	Erik Silye	20	1	19	0	1	1
67	FW	(Hungary) HUN	Dominik Cipf	14	1	13	1	1	0
68	DF	(Hungary) HUN	János Hegedűs	7	0	5	0	2	0
70	FW	(Hungary) HUN	András Radó	22	1	18	1	4	0
73	DF	(Hungary) HUN	László Deutsch	7	0	5	0	2	0
86	FW	(Hungary) HUN	Soma Novothny	21	4	17	3	4	1
88	MF	(Slovakia) SVK	Jozef Urblík	4	1	3	1	1	0
95	GK	(Hungary) HUN	Dávid Dombó	9	-9	5	-5	4	-4
97	FW	(Hungary) HUN	Dávid Zimonyi	11	2	8	0	3	2
98	FW	(Hungary) HUN	Norbert Balogh	4	0	3	0	1	0
99	MF	(Hungary) HUN	József Szalai	3	0	3	0	0	0
Youth players:
19	MF	(Hungary) HUN	Ákos Kapornai	0	0	0	0	0	0
66	MF	(Hungary) HUN	Dominik Sztojka	2	0	1	0	1	0
Out to loan:
7	FW	(Hungary) HUN	Krisztián Géresi	11	0	9	0	2	0
71	FW	(Hungary) HUN	Gergely Bobál	1	0	1	0	0	0
Players no longer at the club:
77	MF	(Hungary) HUN	László Pekár	0	0	0	0	0	0

=== Top scorers ===
Includes all competitive matches. The list is sorted by shirt number when total goals are equal.

Position	Nation	Number	Name	Nemzeti Bajnokság I	Magyar Kupa	Total
1	(Hungary)	10	Filip Holender	8	0	8
2	(Hungary)	13	Zsombor Berecz	5	1	6
2	(Hungary)	86	Soma Novothny	5	1	6
4	(Slovakia)	88	Jozef Urblík	3	0	3
5	(Hungary)	6	Patrik Hidi	2	0	2
5	(Hungary)	8	Sebestyén Ihrig-Farkas	1	1	2
5	(Hungary)	17	Kristóf Hinora	1	1	2
5	(Hungary)	34	Kenneth Otigba	1	1	2
5	(Hungary)	97	Dávid Zimonyi	0	2	2
10	(Hungary)	9	Róbert Feczesin	1	0	1
10	(Hungary)	57	Patrick Iyinbor	0	1	1
10	(Hungary)	58	Erik Silye	0	1	1
10	(Hungary)	67	Dominik Cipf	1	0	1
10	(Hungary)	70	András Radó	1	0	1
/	/	/	Own Goals	0	0	0
			TOTALS	29	9	38

=== Disciplinary record ===
Includes all competitive matches. Players with 1 card or more included only.

Last updated on 13 March 2023

Position	Nation	Number	Name	Nemzeti Bajnokság I		Magyar Kupa		Total (Hu Total)	
Position	Nation	Number	Name	Yellow card	Red card	Yellow card	Red card	Yellow card	Red card
DF	(Hungary)	2	Donát Szivacski	3	1	1	0	4 (3)	1 (1)
DF	(Hungary)	5	Róbert Litauszki	1	0	0	0	1 (1)	0 (0)
MF	(Hungary)	6	Patrik Hidi	2	0	0	0	2 (2)	0 (0)
FW	(Hungary)	7	Krisztián Géresi	2	0	0	0	2 (2)	0 (0)
MF	(Hungary)	8	Sebestyén Ihrig-Farkas	0	0	1	0	1 (0)	0 (0)
FW	(Hungary)	10	Filip Holender	5	0	0	0	5 (5)	0 (0)
MF	(Hungary)	13	Zsombor Berecz	5	0	0	0	5 (5)	0 (0)
MF	(Hungary)	14	Dávid Márkvárt	5	0	0	0	5 (5)	0 (0)
MF	(Hungary)	15	Sándor Hidi	1	0	0	0	1 (1)	0 (0)
MF	(Hungary)	17	Kristóf Hinora	3	0	0	0	3 (3)	0 (0)
DF	(Hungary)	20	Máté Ódor	2	0	1	0	3 (2)	0 (0)
DF	(Hungary)	34	Kenneth Otigba	6	0	1	0	7 (6)	0 (0)
DF	(Hungary)	36	Botond Baráth	3	1	0	0	3 (3)	1 (1)
GK	(Hungary)	55	Levente Jova	1	0	0	0	1 (1)	0 (0)
DF	(Hungary)	58	Erik Silye	2	0	0	0	2 (2)	0 (0)
MF	(Hungary)	66	Dominik Sztojka	1	0	0	0	1 (1)	0 (0)
FW	(Hungary)	67	Dominik Cipf	2	0	0	0	2 (2)	0 (0)
MF	(Hungary)	70	András Radó	1	0	0	0	1 (1)	0 (0)
DF	(Hungary)	73	László Deutsch	0	0	1	0	1 (0)	0 (0)
FW	(Hungary)	86	Soma Novothny	2	0	1	0	3 (2)	0 (0)
			TOTALS	47	2	6	0	53 (47)	2 (2)

=== Clean sheets ===
Last updated on 10 April 2023

Position	Nation	Number	Name	Nemzeti Bajnokság I	Magyar Kupa	Total
1	(Hungary)	55	Levente Jova	3	0	3
2	(Hungary)	95	Dávid Dombó	2	1	3
3	(Hungary)	26	János Uram	2	0	2
			TOTALS	7	1	8
