= 2025–26 Vasas SC season =

Vasas
2025–26 season
- Manager: Gábor Erős
- Top goalscorer: League: Bence Pethő (3); All: Bence Pethő (3)
- Highest home attendance: 1,791 vs Csákvár (27 July 2025)
- Lowest home attendance: 1,781 vs Békéscsaba (11 August 2025)
- Average home league attendance: 1,786
- Biggest win: 2–1 vs Kecskemét (A) (4 August 2025); 4-3 vs Békéscsaba (H) (11 August 2025)
- Biggest defeat: 1–4 vs Csákvár (H) (27 July 2025)
- All statistics correct as of 22 August 2025.

The 2025–26 season is Vasas Sport Club's 91st competitive season, 3rd consecutive season in the Nemzeti Bajnokság II and 114th year in existence as a football club. In addition to the domestic league, Vasas participated in this season's editions of the Hungarian cup.

== Transfers ==
=== Summer ===
In: Note: Flags indicate national team as defined under FIFA eligibility rules; some limited exceptions apply. Players may hold more than one non-FIFA nationality.

No.	Pos.	Nation	Player
—	RB	UKR	Viktor Hey (from MTK Budapest)
—	LW	HUN	Rajmund Horváth (from Gyirmót)
—	CF	HUN	Bence Pethő (from Kazincbarcika)
—	CF	HUN	Barnabás Németh (loan return from Nyíregyháza)
—	DM	HUN	Boldizsár Rab (loan return from Szentlőrinc)
—	CM	HUN	Dominik Sztojka (loan return from Budafok)
—	RW	HUN	Benjámin Szabó (loan return from Ajka)
—	GK	HUN	János Uram (loan return from Békéscsaba)

Out: Note: Flags indicate national team as defined under FIFA eligibility rules; some limited exceptions apply. Players may hold more than one non-FIFA nationality.

No.	Pos.	Nation	Player
—	DM	HUN	Máté Vida (to Karcag)
—	CM	ROU	Szabolcs Szilágyi (to (Romania) Csíkszereda)
—	GK	HUN	Gergő Bánfalvi (loan to Kazincbarcika)
—	RW	HUN	Csaba Bukta (loan to Budafok)
—	CF	HUN	Filip Pintér (loan to Kisvárda)
—	LW	HUN	Filip Holender (loan return to Fehérvár)
—	DM	HUN	Roland Lehoczky (loan return to MTK Budapest)
—	AM	HUN	Barnabás Rácz (mutual consent)
—	CM	HUN	Zsombor Berecz (end of contract)
—	RW	HUN	Regő Szánthó (end of contract)
—	RB	HUN	Gergő Bodnár (mutual consent)

== Competitions ==
=== Overview ===
Competition	First match	Last match	Starting round	Final position	Record							
Competition	First match	Last match	Starting round	Final position	Pld	W	D	L	GF	GA	GD	Win %
Nemzeti Bajnokság II	27 July 2025	17 May 2025	Matchday 1	TBD	5	3	0	2	8	9	−1	60.00
Magyar Kupa	TBD	TBD	Round of 64	TBD	0	0	0	0	0	0	+0	—
Total					5	3	0	2	8	9	−1	60.00

Source: Competitions

=== Nemzeti Bajnokság II ===
==== League table ====
Pos	Team	Pld	W	D	L	GF	GA	GD	Pts	Promotion or relegation
1	Vasas (C, P)	30	20	4	6	59	26	+33	64	Promotion to Nemzeti Bajnokság I
2	Honvéd (P)	30	18	5	7	49	25	+24	59	Promotion to Nemzeti Bajnokság I
3	Kecskemét	30	16	3	11	49	39	+10	51	
4	Kozármisleny	30	13	9	8	38	40	−2	48	
5	Mezőkövesd	30	13	7	10	37	34	+3	46	

Source: Hungarian Football Federation (in Hungarian), Soccerway
Rules for classification: 1) Points; 2) Matches won; 3) Goal difference; 4) Goals scored; 5) Head-to-head points; 6) Head-to-head goal difference; 7) Fair play ranking; 8) Drawing of lots.
(C) Champions; (P) Promoted

==== Results summary ====
Overall								Home						Away					
Pld	W	D	L	GF	GA	GD	Pts	W	D	L	GF	GA	GD	W	D	L	GF	GA	GD
5	3	0	2	8	9	−1	9	2	0	1	6	7	−1	1	0	1	2	2	0

Source: Soccerway

==== Results by round ====
Round	1	2	3	4	5	6	7	8	9	10	11	12	13	14	15	16	17	18	19	20	21	22	23	24	25	26	27	28	29	30
Ground	H	A	H	A	H	A	H	A	H	H	A	H	A	H	A	A	H	A	H	A	H	A	H	A	A	H	A	H	A	H
Result	L	W	W	L	W	W																								
Position	14	8	4	8	5	3																								

Source: Matches
A = Away; H = Home; W = Win; D = Draw; L = Loss

==== Matches ====
27 July 2025 1	Vasas	1–4	Csákvár	Budapest
19:00 CEST (UTC+2)	Kapornai 45'	Report	Magyar 14', 17'; Hey 37' (o.g.); Szalai 89'	Stadium: Illovszky Rudolf Stadion; Attendance: 1,791; Referee: Attila Molnár

4 August 2025 2	Kecskemét	1-2	Vasas	Kecskemét
20:00 CEST	Bolyki 76'	Report	Urblík 7' (pen.); Pethő 25'	Stadium: Széktói Stadion; Attendance: 2,127; Referee: Gergő Bogár

11 August 2025 3	Vasas	4-3	Békéscsaba	Budapest
20:00 CEST	Urblík 15'; Barkóczi 20'; Pethő 61', 79'	Report	Borsos 33', 45', 74'	Stadium: Illovszky Rudolf Stadion; Attendance: 1,781; Referee: Balázs Katona

17 August 2025 4	Karcag	1-0	Vasas	Karcag
17:30 CEST	Kovalovszki 45'	Report		Stadium: Ligeti úti Sporttelep; Attendance: 1,000; Referee: Bence Hanyecz

25 August 2025 5	Vasas	1-0	Tiszakécske	Budapest
20:00 CEST	Tóth 85' (pen.)	Report		Stadium: Illovszky Rudolf Stadion; Referee: Imre Kovács

31 August 2025 6	Kozármisleny	0-4	Vasas	Kozármisleny
19:00 CEST		Report	Radó 13'; Urblík 29'; Hidi M. 31'; Girsik 77'	Stadium: Kozármislenyi Stadion; Referee: Tamás Sipos

21 September 2025 7	Vasas	v	Mezőkövesd	Budapest
19:00 CEST				Stadium: Illovszky Rudolf Stadion

28 September 2025 8	Soroksár	v	Vasas	Budapest (Soroksár)
19:00 CEST				Stadium: Szamosi Mihály Sportelep

5 October 2025 9	Vasas	v	Szeged	Budapest
17:00 CEST				Stadium: Illovszky Rudolf Stadion

19 October 2025 10	Vasas	v	Szentlőrinc	Budapest
17:00 CEST				Stadium: Illovszky Rudolf Stadion

26 October 2025 11	BVSC	v	Vasas	Budapest (Zugló)
13:00 CET				Stadium: Szőnyi úti Stadion

2 November 2025 12	Vasas	v	Fehérvár	Budapest
17:00 CET				Stadium: Illovszky Rudolf Stadion

9 November 2025 13	Budafok	v	Vasas	Budapest (Budafok)
13:00 CET				Stadium: Promontor utcai Stadion

23 November 2025 14	Vasas	v	Honvéd	Budapest
17:00 CET				Stadium: Illovszky Rudolf Stadion

30 November 2025 15	Ajka	v	Vasas	Ajka
15:00 CET				Stadium: Városi Stadion

== Statistics ==
=== Appearances and goals ===
Last updated on 31 August 2025.

No.	Pos	Nat	Player	Total		Nemzeti Bajnokság II		Magyar Kupa	
No.	Pos	Nat	Player	Apps	Goals	Apps	Goals	Apps	Goals
1	GK	(Hungary) HUN	Ágoston Kiss	3	-8	3	-8	0	0
26	GK	(Hungary) HUN	János Uram	3	-1	3	-1	0	0
4	DF	(Hungary) HUN	Bence Pávkovics	5	0	5	0	0	0
6	MF	(Hungary) HUN	Dominik Sztojka	3	0	3	0	0	0
7	FW	(Hungary) HUN	András Radó	4	1	4	1	0	0
9	FW	(Hungary) HUN	Dávid Zimonyi	2	0	2	0	0	0
14	FW	(Hungary) HUN	Áron Doktorics	6	0	6	0	0	0
15	MF	(Hungary) HUN	Sándor Hidi M.	5	1	5	1	0	0
16	MF	(Hungary) HUN	Boldizsár Rab	3	0	3	0	0	0
21	MF	(Hungary) HUN	Bertalan Kapornai	4	1	4	1	0	0
23	GK	(Ukraine) UKR	Viktor Hey	5	0	5	0	0	0
29	FW	(Hungary) HUN	Bence Pethő	6	3	6	3	0	0
34	DF	(Hungary) HUN	Kenneth Otigba	3	0	3	0	0	0
36	DF	(Hungary) HUN	Botond Baráth	3	0	3	0	0	0
46	FW	(Hungary) HUN	Barnabás Barkóczi	5	1	5	1	0	0
56	MF	(Hungary) HUN	Zsombor Hős	6	0	6	0	0	0
57	DF	(Hungary) HUN	Patrick Iyinbor	1	0	1	0	0	0
68	DF	(Hungary) HUN	Attila Girsik	5	1	5	1	0	0
77	FW	(Hungary) HUN	Milán Tóth	3	1	3	1	0	0
84	FW	(Hungary) HUN	Rajmund Horváth	3	0	3	0	0	0
88	MF	(Slovakia) SVK	Jozef Urblík	6	3	6	3	0	0
89	FW	(Hungary) HUN	Csaba Molnár	3	0	3	0	0	0
92	FW	(Hungary) HUN	Barnabás Németh	4	0	4	0	0	0
94	MF	(Hungary) HUN	Benjámin Cseke	2	0	2	0	0	0

=== Top scorers ===
Includes all competitive matches. The list is sorted by shirt number when total goals are equal.

Position	Nation	Number	Name	Nemzeti Bajnokság II	Magyar Kupa	Total
1	(Hungary)	29	Bence Pethő	3	0	3
1	(Slovakia)	88	Jozef Urblík	3	0	3
3	(Hungary)	7	András Radó	1	0	1
3	(Hungary)	15	Sándor Hidi M.	1	0	1
3	(Hungary)	21	Bertalan Kapornai	1	0	1
3	(Hungary)	46	Barnabás Barkóczi	1	0	1
3	(Hungary)	68	Attila Girsik	1	0	1
3	(Hungary)	77	Milán Tóth	1	0	1
			Own Goals	0	0	0
			TOTALS	7	0	7

=== Disciplinary record ===
Includes all competitive matches. Players with 1 card or more included only.

Last updated on 31 August 2025

Position	Nation	Number	Name	Nemzeti Bajnokság II		Magyar Kupa		Total (Hu Total)	
Position	Nation	Number	Name	Yellow card	Red card	Yellow card	Red card	Yellow card	Red card
DF	(Hungary)	4	Bence Pávkovics	2	0	0	0	2 (2)	0 (0)
MF	(Hungary)	6	Dominik Sztojka	2	0	0	0	2 (2)	0 (0)
MF	(Hungary)	15	Hidi M. Sándor	1	0	0	0	1 (1)	0 (0)
MF	(Hungary)	16	Boldizsár Rab	1	0	0	0	1 (1)	0 (0)
DF	(Hungary)	36	Botond Baráth	2	0	0	0	2 (2)	0 (0)
FW	(Hungary)	46	Barnabás Barkóczi	2	0	0	0	2 (2)	0 (0)
MF	(Hungary)	56	Zsombor Hős	1	0	0	0	1 (1)	0 (0)
DF	(Hungary)	68	Attila Girsik	1	0	0	0	1 (1)	0 (0)
FW	(Hungary)	77	Milán Tóth	1	0	0	0	1 (1)	0 (0)
MF	(Slovakia)	88	Jozef Urblík	3	0	0	0	3 (3)	0 (0)
FW	(Hungary)	89	Csaba Molnár	1	0	0	0	1 (1)	0 (0)
MF	(Hungary)	94	Benjámin Cseke	1	0	0	0	1 (1)	0 (0)
			TOTALS	18	0	0	0	18 (18)	0 (0)
