= László Pekár =

Hungarian footballer (born 1993)

- Pekár playing for BVSC in 2026

Personal information
- Date of birth: 20 January 1993 (age 33)
- Place of birth: Szolnok, Hungary
- Height: 1.73 m (5 ft 8 in)
- Position: Winger

Team information
- Current team: Budafok

Youth career
- 2002–2008: Szolnok
- 2008–2011: Kecskemét

Senior career*
Years	Team	Apps	(Gls)
2010–2014	Kecskemét II	8	(0)
2010–2014	Kecskemét	56	(3)
2014–2015	Nyíregyháza	29	(9)
2015–2017	Puskás Akadémia	48	(12)
2015–2017	Puskás Akadémia II	5	(2)
2017–2019	Nyíregyháza	55	(17)
2019–2020	Mezőkövesd	36	(3)
2019–2020	Mezőkövesd II	2	(3)
2020–2022	Vasas	57	(4)
2022–2023	Nyíregyháza	27	(3)
2023–2024	Kazincbarcika	29	(7)
2024–2026	BVSC	52	(9)
2026–	Budafok	7	(3)

International career
2011–2012	Hungary U19	9	(1)
2012	Hungary U21	2	(0)
- * Club domestic league appearances and goals as of 19 September 2026

László Pekár (born 20 January 1993) is a Hungarian professional footballer who plays for Nemzeti Bajnokság III club Budafok.

== Club career ==
On 30 September 2022, Pekár returned to Nyíregyháza on a two-year contract.

== International career ==
In November 2015 he was part of the Hungary national squad for the UEFA Euro 2016 play-offs against Norway.

== Career statistics ==
As of match played 19 September 2026

Appearances and goals by club, season and competition
Club	Season	League			National cup (Note: Includes Magyar Kupa)		League cup (Note: Includes Ligakupa)		Other		Total	
Club	Season	Division	Apps	Goals	Apps	Goals	Apps	Goals	Apps	Goals	Apps	Goals
Kecskemét II	2010–11	Nemzeti Bajnokság III	1	0	—		—		—		1	0
Kecskemét II	2011–12	Nemzeti Bajnokság III	7	0	—		—		—		7	0
Kecskemét II	Total		8	0	—		—		—		8	0
Kecskemét	2011–12	Nemzeti Bajnokság I	11	1	1	0	9	1	—		21	2
Kecskemét	2012–13	Nemzeti Bajnokság I	23	2	—		2	0	—		25	2
Kecskemét	2013–14	Nemzeti Bajnokság I	22	0	3	0	5	4	—		30	4
Kecskemét	Total		56	3	4	0	16	5	—		76	8
Nyíregyháza	2014–15	Nemzeti Bajnokság I	29	9	3	6	8	3	—		40	18
Puskás Akadémia	2015–16	Nemzeti Bajnokság I	31	7	1	0	—		—		32	7
Puskás Akadémia	2016–17	Nemzeti Bajnokság II	17	5	3	0	—		—		20	5
Puskás Akadémia	Total		48	12	4	0	—		—		52	12
Puskás Akadémia II	2016–17	Nemzeti Bajnokság III	5	2	—		—		—		5	2
Nyíregyháza	2017–18	Nemzeti Bajnokság II	38	9	1	0	—		—		39	9
Nyíregyháza	2018–19	Nemzeti Bajnokság II	17	8	2	0	—		—		19	8
Nyíregyháza	Total		55	17	3	0	—		—		58	17
Mezőkövesd	2018–19	Nemzeti Bajnokság I	10	2	1	0	—		—		11	2
Mezőkövesd	2019–20	Nemzeti Bajnokság I	26	1	8	2	—		—		34	3
Mezőkövesd	Total		36	3	9	2	—		—		45	5
Mezőkövesd II	2018–19	Megyei Bajnokság I	2	3	—		—		—		2	3
Vasas	2020–21	Nemzeti Bajnokság II	30	0	3	2	—		—		33	2
Vasas	2021–22	Nemzeti Bajnokság II	27	4	1	0	—		—		28	4
Vasas	2022–23	Nemzeti Bajnokság I	0	0	—		—		—		0	0
Vasas	Total		57	4	4	2	—		—		61	6
Nyíregyháza	2022–23	Nemzeti Bajnokság II	27	3	1	0	—		2 (Note: Appearances in Nemzeti Bajnokság II Relegation play-offs)	0	30	3
Nyíregyháza	Nyíregyháza total		111	29	7	6	8	3	2	0	128	38
Kazincbarcika	2023–24	Nemzeti Bajnokság II	29	7	2	1	—		—		31	8
BVSC	2024–25	Nemzeti Bajnokság II	29	8	2	0	—		—		31	8
BVSC	2025–26	Nemzeti Bajnokság II	23	1	1	0	—		—		24	1
BVSC	Total		52	9	3	0	—		—		55	69
Budafok	2026–27	Nemzeti Bajnokság III	7	3	1	0	—		—		8	3
Career total			411	75	34	11	24	8	2	0	471	94

== Honours ==
Kecskemét

- Ligakupa runner-up: 2011–12

Puskás Akadémia

- Nemzeti Bajnokság II: 2016–17

Mezőkövesd

- Magyar Kupa runner-up: 2019–20

Vasas

- Nemzeti Bajnokság II: 2021–22
