= Dávid Sinkovits =

Serbian-born Hungarian footballer

Personal information
- Full name: Dávid Sinkovits
- Date of birth: 7 May 1998 (age 28)
- Place of birth: Subotica, FR Yugoslavia
- Height: 1.69 m (5 ft 7 in)
- Position: Defensive midfielder

Team information
- Current team: Čantavir

Youth career
- Spartak Subotica
- TSC

Senior career*
Years	Team	Apps	(Gls)
2017–2021	TSC	59	(2)
2020–2021	→ Szentlőrinc (loan)	2	(0)
2021–2022	Tisa Adorjan		
2022-	FK Čantavir		
- * Club domestic league appearances and goals as of 13 July 2020

Dávid Sinkovits (Serbian Cyrillic: Давид Шинковић, romanized: David Šinković; born 7 May 1998) is a Serbian-born Hungarian footballer who plays as a defensive midfielder.
