= Kristóf Hinora =

Hungarian footballer (born 1998)

Personal information
- Date of birth: 5 February 1998 (age 28)
- Place of birth: Mór, Hungary
- Height: 1.76 m (5 ft 9 in)
- Position: Midfielder

Team information
- Current team: Paks
- Number: 17

Youth career
- Bodajk SE
- Főnix-Gold
- Fehérvár
- MTK

Senior career*
Years	Team	Apps	(Gls)
2016–2019	MTK	0	(0)
2016–2019	MTK II	6	(0)
2017–2018	→ Nyíregyháza (loan)	27	(2)
2018–2019	→ Vasas (loan)	27	(3)
2019–2025	Vasas	141	(14)
2024–2025	Vasas II	3	(2)
2025–	Paks	26	(2)

International career^{‡}
2016	Hungary U18	6	(0)
2017	Hungary U19	2	(0)
2017–2021	Hungary U21	10	(0)
- * Club domestic league appearances and goals as of 30 May 2026 ‡ National team caps and goals as of 14:35, 29 September 2024 (UTC)

Kristóf Hinora (born 5 February 1998) is a Hungarian professional footballer who plays as a midfielder for Nemzeti Bajnokság I club Paks. He represented Hungary at youth level.

== Career ==
On 20 August 2016, Hinora extended his contract until summer 2019 with Nemzeti Bajnokság I club MTK to prove himself in the reserve team.

In the 2017–18 season, he was loaned out to Nemzeti Bajnokság II club Nyíregyháza.

On 3 July 2018, Hinora completed a season-long loan move to Nemzeti Bajnokság II club Vasas along with Balázs Bese. On 13 June 2019, he completed his permanent move to the Budapest team.

It was announced on 11 September 2024 that he went on a successful hernia surgery after missing from trainings and matches due to constant pain.

On 14 May 2025, he won the 2025 Magyar Kupa final with Paksi FC after beating Ferencvárosi TC 4–3 on penalty shoot-out.

== Career statistics ==
=== Club ===
As of match played 26 May 2024

Appearances and goals by club, season and competition
Club	Season	League			National cup (Note: Includes Magyar Kupa)		Total	
Club	Season	Division	Apps	Goals	Apps	Goals	Apps	Goals
MTK II	2016–17	Nemzeti Bajnokság III	6	0	—		6	0
Nyíregyháza (loan)	2017–18	Nemzeti Bajnokság II	27	2	2	0	29	2
Vasas (loan)	2018–19	Nemzeti Bajnokság II	27	3	3	0	30	3
Vasas	2019–20	Nemzeti Bajnokság II	26	2	3	0	29	2
Vasas	2020–21	Nemzeti Bajnokság II	30	4	2	0	32	4
Vasas	2021–22	Nemzeti Bajnokság II	34	7	2	1	36	8
Vasas	2022–23	Nemzeti Bajnokság I	29	1	4	1	33	2
Vasas	2023–24	Nemzeti Bajnokság II	22	0	4	0	26	0
Vasas	Total		168	17	18	2	186	19
Vasas II	2023–24	Nemzeti Bajnokság III	3	2	—		3	2
Vasas	2024–25	Nemzeti Bajnokság II	0	0	0	0	0	0
Paks	2024–25	Nemzeti Bajnokság I	0	0	0	0	0	0
Career total			204	21	20	2	224	23

== Honours ==
Vasas

- Nemzeti Bajnokság II: 2021–22
