= Dominik Cipf =

Hungarian footballer (born 2001)

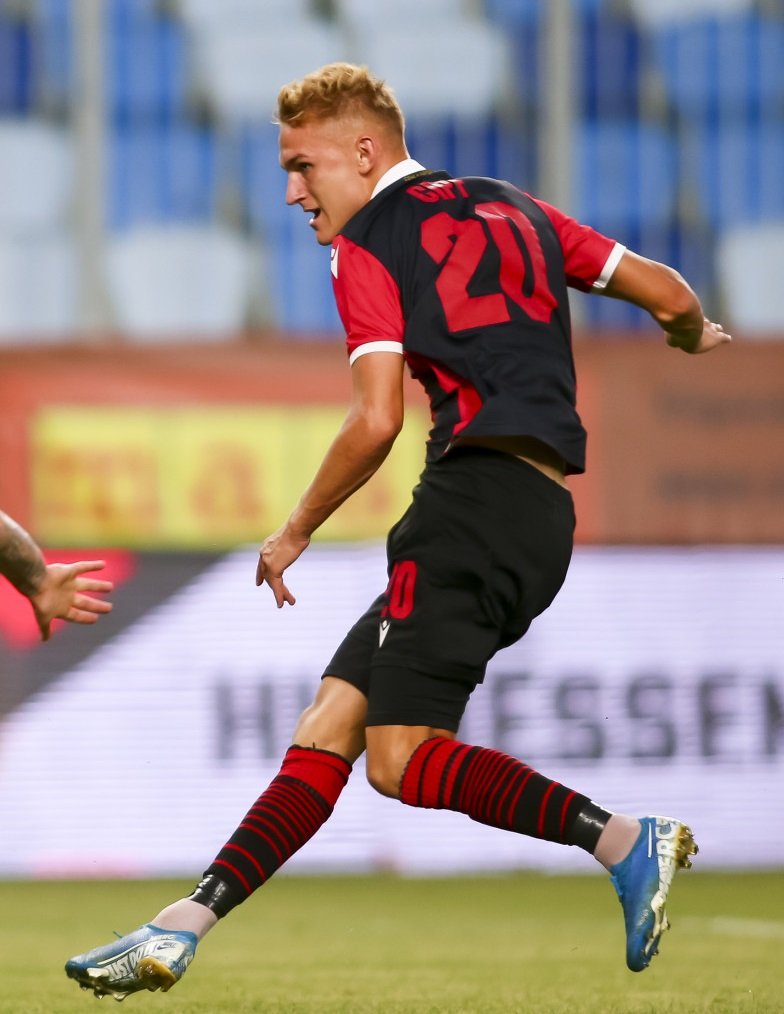
- Cipf playing for Honvéd in 2020

Personal information
- Date of birth: 30 January 2001 (age 25)
- Place of birth: Kisvárda, Hungary
- Height: 1.80 m (5 ft 11 in)
- Position: Forward

Team information
- Current team: Ajka
- Number: 10

Youth career
- 2011–2015: Nyíregyháza
- 2015–2018: Honvéd

Senior career*
Years	Team	Apps	(Gls)
2018–2021	Honvéd	18	(0)
2020	→ Ajka (loan)	2	(0)
2021	→ Siófok (loan)	20	(3)
2021–2022	Siófok	21	(7)
2022–2023	Vasas	30	(4)
2023–2025	Tiszakécske	26	(1)
2024–2025	→ Kozármisleny (loan)	26	(1)
2025–	Ajka	25	(6)

International career^{‡}
2017	Hungary U-16	5	(2)
2017–2018	Hungary U-17	12	(1)
2018–2019	Hungary U-18	13	(1)
2019	Hungary U-19	6	(2)
- * Club domestic league appearances and goals as of 31 May 2026 ‡ National team caps and goals as of 15 October 2019

Dominik Cipf (born 30 January 2001) is a Hungarian football player who plays for Ajka.

== Career ==
=== Honvéd ===
On 21 July 2018, Cipf played his first match for Honvéd in a 3–2 win against Szombathelyi Haladás in the Hungarian League.

=== Vasas ===
On 4 February 2022, Cipf signed with Vasas.

== Career statistics ==
Appearances and goals by club, season and competition
Club	Season	League			Cup		Europe		Total	
Club	Season	Division	Apps	Goals	Apps	Goals	Apps	Goals	Apps	Goals
Honvéd II
Honvéd II	2017–18	Nemzeti Bajnokság III	1	0	—		—		1	0
Honvéd II	2018–19	Nemzeti Bajnokság III	2	0	—		—		2	0
Honvéd II	2019–20	Nemzeti Bajnokság III	9	4	—		—		9	4
Honvéd II	2020–21	Nemzeti Bajnokság III	6	0	—		—		6	0
Honvéd II	Total		18	4	0	0	0	0	18	4
Honvéd
Honvéd	2018–19	Nemzeti Bajnokság I	2	0	2	0	1	0	5	0
Honvéd	2019–20	Nemzeti Bajnokság I	14	0	1	1	2	0	17	1
Honvéd	2020–21	Nemzeti Bajnokság I	2	0	1	0	0	0	3	0
Honvéd	Total		18	0	4	1	3	0	25	1
Ajka	2019–20	Nemzeti Bajnokság II	2	0	0	0	—		2	0
Siófok
Siófok	2020–21	Nemzeti Bajnokság II	20	3	2	0	—		22	3
Siófok	2021–22	Nemzeti Bajnokság II	21	7	1	0	—		22	7
Siófok	Total		41	10	3	0	0	0	44	10
Vasas
Vasas	2021–22	Nemzeti Bajnokság II	11	3	1	0	—		12	3
Vasas	2022–23	Nemzeti Bajnokság I	19	1	1	0	—		20	1
Vasas	Total		30	4	2	0	0	0	32	4
Tiszakécske
Tiszakécske	2023–24	Nemzeti Bajnokság II	25	1	2	0	—		27	1
Tiszakécske	2024–25	Nemzeti Bajnokság III	1	0	1	0	—		2	0
Tiszakécske	Total		26	1	3	0	0	0	29	1
Kozármisleny	2024–25	Nemzeti Bajnokság II	26	1	1	0	—		27	1
Career total			161	20	13	1	3	0	177	21

Updated to games played as of 20 July 2025.
