= Máté Ódor =

Hungarian footballer (born 2001)

Personal information
- Date of birth: 29 April 2001 (age 25)
- Place of birth: Székesfehérvár, Hungary
- Height: 1.89 m (6 ft 2 in)
- Position: Defender

Team information
- Current team: FK Csíkszereda (on loan from Vasas)
- Number: 22

Youth career
- 2007–2013: Aba Sárvíz
- 2013–2019: Fehérvár

Senior career*
Years	Team	Apps	(Gls)
2018–2020	Fehérvár II	22	(0)
2020–2022	Szeged-Csanád	67	(1)
2022–	Vasas	40	(0)
2022–2026	Vasas II	8	(1)
2026–	→ FK Csíkszereda (loan)	11	(0)

International career
2017	Hungary U17	1	(0)
- * Club domestic league appearances and goals as of 7 November 2026

Máté Ódor (born 29 April 2001) is a Hungarian professional footballer who plays as a defender for Liga I club FK Csíkszereda, on loan from Nemzeti Bajnokság I club Vasas.

== Honours ==
Vasas

- Nemzeti Bajnokság II: 2025–26
