= Levente Jova =

Hungarian footballer

Personal information
- Date of birth: 30 January 1992 (age 34)
- Place of birth: Orosháza, Hungary
- Height: 1.86 m (6 ft 1 in)
- Position: Goalkeeper

Team information
- Current team: Soroksár
- Number: 28

Youth career
- 2002–2007: Békéscsaba
- 2007–2010: MTK

Senior career*
Years	Team	Apps	(Gls)
2010–2017	Ferencváros	69	(0)
2017	→ Soroksár	18	(0)
2017–2020	Nyíregyháza	84	(5)
2020–2026	Vasas	114	(0)
2026–	Soroksár	2	(0)

International career^{‡}
2011–2012	Hungary U-20	2	(0)
2012–2014	Hungary U-21	13	(0)
- * Club domestic league appearances and goals as of 31 May 2026 ‡ National team caps and goals as of 5 March 2014

Levente Jova (born 30 January 1992) is a Hungarian football player. He plays for Soroksár in the Hungarian NB II. He played his first league match in 2011.

== Career statistics ==
As of games played as of 6 July 2017

Appearances and goals by club, season and competition
Club	Season	League			Cup		League Cup		Europe		Total	
Club	Season	Division	Apps	Goals	Apps	Goals	Apps	Goals	Apps	Goals	Apps	Goals
Ferencváros	2010–11	Nemzeti Bajnokság I	0	0	0	0	1	0	0	0	1	0
Ferencváros	2011–12	Nemzeti Bajnokság I	20	0	4	0	1	0	0	0	25	0
Ferencváros	2012–13	Nemzeti Bajnokság I	30	0	0	0	4	0	0	0	34	0
Ferencváros	2013–14	Nemzeti Bajnokság I	17	0	3	0	3	0	0	0	23	0
Ferencváros	2014–15	Nemzeti Bajnokság I	0	0	4	0	10	0	0	0	14	0
Ferencváros	2015–16	Nemzeti Bajnokság I	2	0	3	0	0	0	0	0	5	0
Ferencváros	2016–17	Nemzeti Bajnokság I	0	0	2	0	0	0	0	0	2	0
Ferencváros	Total		69	0	16	0	19	0	0	0	104	0
Soroksár	2016–17	Nemzeti Bajnokság II	19	0	0	0	0	0	0	0	19	0
Career total			88	0	14	0	19	0	0	0	121	0

== Honours ==
Ferencváros

- Hungarian League Cup (1): 2012–13
