= Zsolt Magyar =

Hungarian footballer (born 2001)

Personal information
- Full name: Zsolt János Magyar
- Date of birth: 11 July 2001 (age 25)
- Place of birth: Zirc, Hungary
- Height: 1.69 m (5 ft 7 in)
- Position: Midfielder

Team information
- Current team: FK Csíkszereda (on loan from Puskás Akadémia)
- Number: 30

Youth career
- 2007–2015: Veszprém
- 2015–2016: Ferencváros
- 2016–2020: Puskás Akadémia

Senior career*
Years	Team	Apps	(Gls)
2018–2023	Puskás Akadémia II	33	(7)
2020–2023	Puskás Akadémia	0	(0)
2020–2022	→ Csákvár (loan)	60	(6)
2023–2024	Szeged-Csanád	21	(1)
2024–2025	Veszprém	18	(2)
2025–2026	Csákvár	14	(8)
2026–	Puskás Akadémia	12	(1)
2026–	→ FK Csíkszereda (loan)	3	(0)

International career
2017	Hungary U17	1	(0)
- * Club domestic league appearances and goals as of 17 August 2026

Zsolt János Magyar (born 11 July 2001) is a Hungarian professional footballer who plays as a midfielder for Liga I club FK Csíkszereda, on loan from Nemzeti Bajnokság I club Puskás Akadémia.
