= Róbert Feczesin =

Hungarian footballer

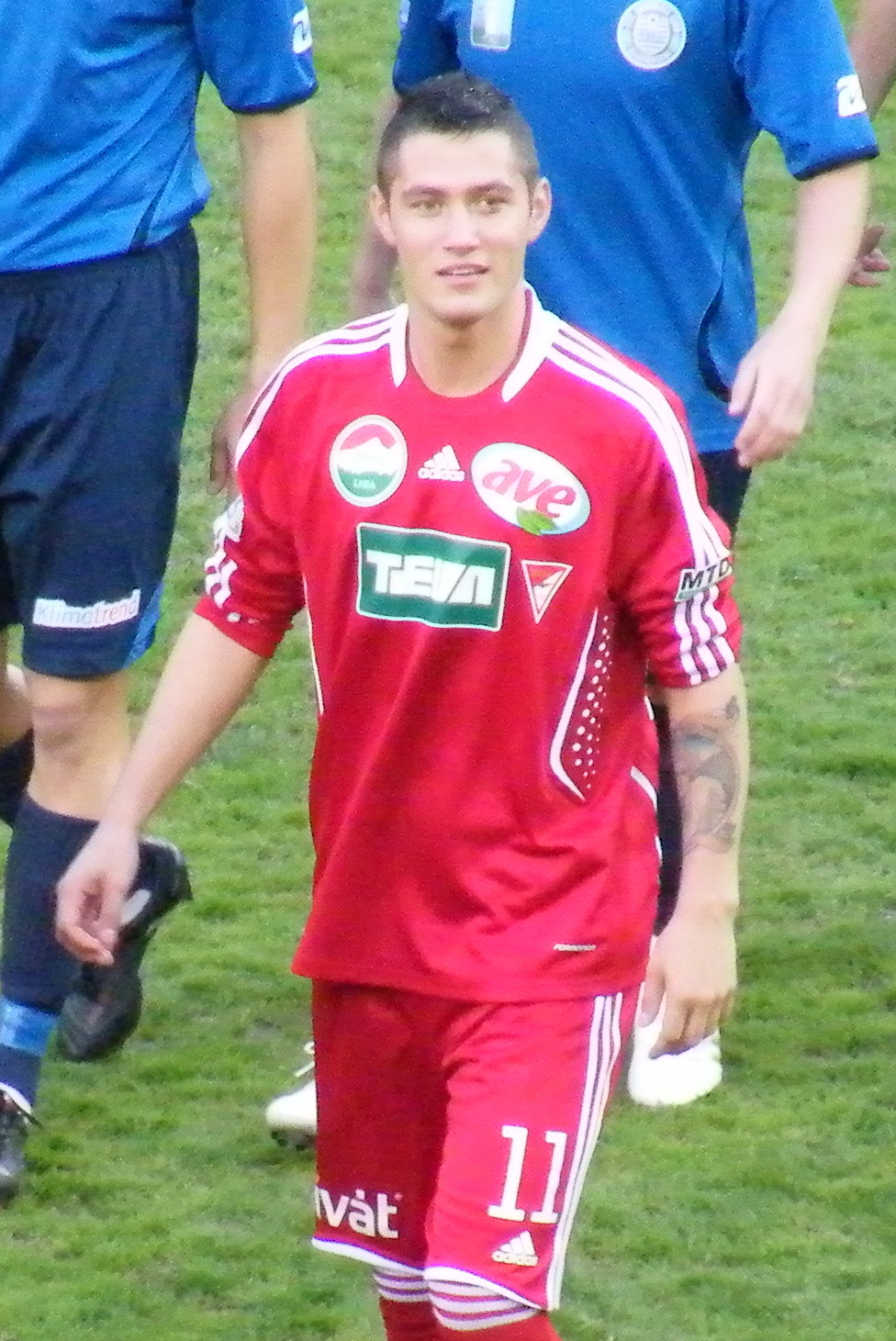

Personal information
- Date of birth: 22 February 1986 (age 40)
- Place of birth: Dabas, Hungary
- Height: 1.87 m (6 ft 2 in)
- Position: Striker

Youth career
- 1995–1999: Dabas
- 1999–2001: Vasas
- 2001–2003: Újpest

Senior career*
Years	Team	Apps	(Gls)
2003–2006	Újpest	48	(12)
2006–2007	Sopron	38	(11)
2007–2012	Brescia	82	(9)
2009–2010	→ Debrecen (loan)	16	(8)
2011	→ Ascoli (loan)	19	(8)
2012–2013	Ascoli	39	(7)
2013–2014	Padova	15	(0)
2014–2017	Videoton	64	(20)
2017–2018	Jeonnam Dragons	32	(10)
2018–2019	Adanaspor	24	(4)
2019–2020	Újpest	12	(8)
2020–2023	Vasas	74	(35)
2023	Vasas II	11	(3)

International career
2002–2003	Hungary U-17	6	(2)
2004	Hungary U-19	2	(0)
2004–2008	Hungary U-21	15	(7)
2005–2019	Hungary	12	(4)
- * Club domestic league appearances and goals as of 21 May 2023

Róbert Feczesin (Hungarian: [ˈroːbɛrt ˈfɛt͡sɛʃin]; born 22 February 1986) is a Hungarian professional footballer who plays as a striker.

He has played twelve times for Hungary scoring four goals, including one in a win against world champions Italy on 22 August 2007.

He won his first cap against Mexico on 14 December 2005.

== Career statistics ==
=== Club ===
As of 2 August 2020

Appearances and goals by club, season and competition
Club	Season	League			Cup		—		Total	
Club	Season	Division	App	Goal	App	Goal	App	Goal	App	Goal
Újpest	2003–04	Nemzeti Bajnokság I	13	4	–	–	—	—	13	4
Újpest	2004–05	Nemzeti Bajnokság I	23	4	1	1	4	1	28	6
Újpest	2005–06	Nemzeti Bajnokság I	12	4	1	2	—	—	13	6
Újpest	Total		48	12	2	3	4	1	54	16
FC Sopron	2005–06	Nemzeti Bajnokság I	9	0	—	—	—	—	9	0
FC Sopron	2006–07	Nemzeti Bajnokság I	29	11	2	2	2	1	33	14
FC Sopron	Total		38	11	2	2	2	1	42	14
Brescia Calcio	2007–08	Serie B	28	3	1	1	—	—	30	4
Brescia Calcio	2008–09	Serie B	22	1	1	0	—	—	23	1
Brescia Calcio	2010–11	Serie A	2	0	2	1	—	—	23	1
Brescia Calcio	2011–12	Serie B	29	5	2	2	—	—	23	1
Brescia Calcio	2012–13	Serie B	1	0	1	0	—	—	23	1
Brescia Calcio	Total		82	9	7	4	—	—	89	13
Debrecen (loan)	2009–10	Nemzeti Bajnokság I	16	8	3	1	—	—	19	9
Ascoli (loan)	2010–11	Serie B	19	8	0	0	—	—	19	8
Ascoli	2012–13	Serie B	38	7	0	0	—	—	38	7
Padova	2013–14	Serie B	15	0	0	0	—	—	15	0
Videoton	2014–15	Nemzeti Bajnokság I	20	7	18	20	1	0	39	27
Videoton	2015–16	Nemzeti Bajnokság I	26	5	6	2	6	2	38	9
Videoton	2016–17	Nemzeti Bajnokság I	18	8	2	2	—	—	20	10
Videoton	Total		64	20	26	24	7	2	97	46
Jeonnam Dragons	2017	K League 1	32	10	2	1	—	—	34	11
Adanaspor	2018–19	TFF First League	24	4	1	1	—	—	25	5
Újpest	2019–20	Nemzeti Bajnokság I	12	8	2	1	—	—	14	9
Vasas	2019–20	Nemzeti Bajnokság II	7	6	0	0	—	—	7	6
Vasas	2020–21	Nemzeti Bajnokság II	1	1	0	0	—	—	1	1
Vasas	Total		8	7	0	0	0	0	8	7
Career total			396	104	45	37	13	4	454	149

=== International ===
#	Date	Venue	Opponent	Score	Result	Competition
1.	18 December 2005	Miami Stadium, Miami, United States	Antigua and Barbuda	2–0	3–0	International Friendly
2.	22 August 2007	Puskás Ferenc Stadium, Budapest, Hungary	Italy	2–1	3–1	International Friendly
3.	13 October 2007	Puskás Ferenc Stadium, Budapest, Hungary	Malta	1–0	2–0	UEFA Euro 2008 Qual.
4.	11 September 2011	Puskás Ferenc Stadium, Budapest, Hungary	Liechtenstein	5–0	5–0	International Friendly

== Honours ==
Újpest

- Nemzeti Bajnokság I runner-up: 2005–06, 2003–04

Debrecen

- Nemzeti Bajnokság I: 2009–10
- Hungarian Cup: 2009–10
- Hungarian League Cup: 2010

Videoton

- Nemzeti Bajnokság I: 2014-15
