= Ádám Balajti =

Hungarian footballer

Personal information
- Full name: Ádám Balajti
- Date of birth: 7 March 1991 (age 35)
- Place of birth: Eger, Hungary
- Height: 1.76 m (5 ft 9 in)
- Position: Striker

Team information
- Current team: Budaörs

Youth career
- 1999–2000: Debrecen
- 2000–2005: Eger
- 2005–2007: Ferencváros
- 2007–2009: Újpest

Senior career*
| Years | Team | Apps | (Gls) |
| 2009–2010 | Diósgyőr | 23 | (6) |
| 2010–2014 | Debrecen | 1 | (0) |
| 2011–2012 | → Újpest (loan) | 17 | (4) |
| 2012–2013 | → MTK (loan) | 36 | (9) |
| 2013–2014 | → Mezőkövesd (loan) | 24 | (4) |
| 2014–2015 | Mezőkövesd | 27 | (5) |
| 2015–2016 | Szolnok | 26 | (2) |
| 2016 | Győr | 3 | (0) |
| 2016–2018 | Vác FC | 65 | (25) |
| 2018–2023 | Vasas | 93 | (52) |
| 2022–2023 | → Tiszakécske (loan) | 10 | (1) |
| 2023–2024 | Vasas II | 9 | (4) |
| 2024– | Budaörs | 0 | (0) |

International career
| 2009–2010 | Hungary U-20 | 4 | (1) |
| 2010–2013 | Hungary U-21 | 6 | (0) |
- * Club domestic league appearances and goals as of 18 November 2023

Ádám Balajti (born 7 March 1991) is a Hungarian professional footballer who plays as a striker for Budaörs.

== Career statistics ==
As of 22 May 2022

Appearances and goals by club, season and competition
| Club | Season | League | | | Cup | | Continental | | Other | | Total | |
| Club | Season | Division | Apps | Goals | Apps | Goals | Apps | Goals | Apps | Goals | Apps | Goals |
|---|---|---|---|---|---|---|---|---|---|---|---|---|
| Diósgyőr | 2008–09 | Nemzeti Bajnokság I | 1 | 1 | 0 | 0 | — | | — | | 1 | 1 |
| Diósgyőr | 2009–10 | Nemzeti Bajnokság I | 22 | 5 | 1 | 0 | — | | 3 | 0 | 26 | 5 |
| Diósgyőr | Total | | 23 | 6 | 1 | 0 | 0 | 0 | 3 | 0 | 27 | 6 |
| Debrecen | 2007–08 | Nemzeti Bajnokság I | 1 | 0 | 0 | 0 | — | | 0 | 0 | 1 | 0 |
| Újpest | 2010–11 | Nemzeti Bajnokság I | 13 | 3 | 2 | 0 | — | | 0 | 0 | 15 | 3 |
| Újpest | 2011–12 | Nemzeti Bajnokság I | 4 | 1 | 2 | 0 | — | | 2 | 0 | 8 | 1 |
| Újpest | Total | | 17 | 4 | 4 | 0 | 0 | 0 | 2 | 0 | 23 | 4 |
| MTK Budapest | 2012–13 | Nemzeti Bajnokság II | 13 | 7 | 3 | 0 | — | | — | | 16 | 7 |
| MTK Budapest | 2012–13 | Nemzeti Bajnokság I | 23 | 2 | 1 | 0 | — | | 5 | 4 | 29 | 6 |
| MTK Budapest | Total | | 36 | 9 | 4 | 0 | 0 | 0 | 5 | 4 | 45 | 13 |
| Mezőkövesd | 2013–14 | Nemzeti Bajnokság I | 24 | 4 | 2 | 1 | — | | 7 | 3 | 33 | 8 |
| Mezőkövesd | 2014–15 | Nemzeti Bajnokság II | 28 | 5 | 2 | 2 | — | | 2 | 0 | 32 | 7 |
| Mezőkövesd | Total | | 52 | 9 | 4 | 3 | 0 | 0 | 9 | 3 | 65 | 15 |
| Szolnok | 2015–16 | Nemzeti Bajnokság II | 26 | 2 | 2 | 0 | — | | — | | 28 | 2 |
| Győr | 2016–17 | Nemzeti Bajnokság III | 3 | 0 | 0 | 0 | — | | — | | 3 | 0 |
| Vác | 2016–17 | Nemzeti Bajnokság II | 26 | 9 | 2 | 2 | — | | — | | 28 | 11 |
| Vác | 2017–18 | Nemzeti Bajnokság II | 37 | 14 | 2 | 0 | — | | — | | 39 | 14 |
| Vác | 2018–19 | Nemzeti Bajnokság II | 2 | 2 | 0 | 0 | — | | — | | 2 | 2 |
| Vác | Total | | 65 | 25 | 4 | 2 | 0 | 0 | 0 | 0 | 69 | 27 |
| Vasas | 2018–19 | Nemzeti Bajnokság II | 35 | 30 | 1 | 0 | — | | — | | 36 | 30 |
| Vasas | 2019–20 | Nemzeti Bajnokság II | 23 | 13 | 2 | 1 | — | | — | | 25 | 14 |
| Vasas | 2020–21 | Nemzeti Bajnokság II | 30 | 9 | 1 | 0 | — | | — | | 31 | 9 |
| Vasas | 2021–22 | Nemzeti Bajnokság II | 5 | 0 | 2 | 1 | — | | — | | 7 | 1 |
| Vasas | Total | | 93 | 52 | 5 | 2 | 0 | 0 | 0 | 0 | 99 | 54 |
| Career total | | | 316 | 107 | 24 | 7 | 0 | 0 | 19 | 7 | 360 | 121 |

== Honours ==
- FIFA U-20 World Cup:
  - Third place: 2009
