= Illovszky Rudolf Stadion =

Sports venue in Budapest, Hungary

Coordinates: 47°32′13″N 19°04′50″E

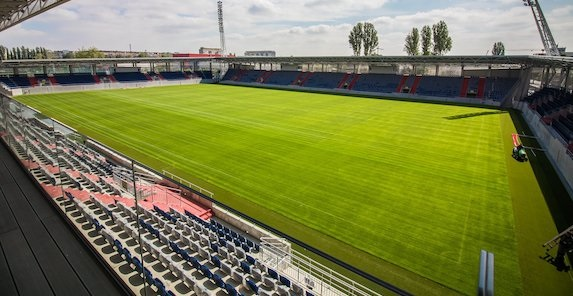
- Interactive map of Illovszky Rudolf Stadion
- Location: Angyalföld, Budapest, Hungary
- Owner: Vasas SC
- Capacity: 5,054
- Surface: Grass; Field
- Field size: 105x68m

Construction
- Groundbreaking: 2017
- Opened: 5 July 2019
- Cost: 7,5 billion HUF

Tenant
- Vasas SC

Illovszky Rudolf Stadion is a multi-use stadium in Angyalföld, Budapest, Hungary. It is used mostly for football matches and is the home stadium of Vasas SC. The stadium holds 5,054 people.

== History ==
=== Planning ===
On 8 December 2015 it was announced that a completely new stadium will be built by the end of the year 2017. László Markovits, president of Vasas SC, said that the constructions will begin in the 2016–17 Nemzeti Bajnokság I season. Therefore, the club will have to move to the newly built Hidegkuti Nándor Stadium to play the rest of the matches. The capacity of the stadium will be 5,000.

On 29 October 2016, the last match was played at the stadium. Vasas SC hosted Videoton FC on the 14 match day of the 2016–17 Nemzeti Bajnokság I season. The first goals was scored by Remili in the 37th minute. However, the last goal was scored by Lazović in the 92nd minute. The match ended with a 1–1 draw in front of 5,050 spectators.

On 1 November 2016, it was revealed that the new stadium will be rotated minimally. The new stadium will be perpendicular to Fáy utca.

On 7 January 2017, the supporters of Vasas wrote an open letter asking for a stadium with a bigger capacity. Vasas FC backed the idea to apply for a bigger stadium.

On 16 March 2017 László Markovits, president of Vasas SC, signed the contract with the Market-KÉSZ consortium. The capacity of the stadium will be 5,154 but the eastern stand can be expanded reaching a total capacity of 6,204. The construction will be finished by the summer of 2018. Markovits also said that the expansion of the stadium would postpone the constructions by 1 and half years. However, it was rumored that Viktor Orbán would support the idea to build a bigger stadium in Fáy utca.

=== Opening ===
On 5 July 2019 the stadium was opened. The first match was played between Vasas SC and FC DAC 1904 Dunajská Streda. On 11 July 2019 the first international match was played in the stadium, when Budapest Honvéd hosted FK Žalgiris in the 2019-20 UEFA Europa League qualifying phase.

== Milestone matches ==
5 July 2019	Vasas (Hungary)	2–0	FC DAC 1904 Dunajská Streda (Slovakia)	First match
	Birtalan 78' 87'	Report		Attendance: 4,900; Referee: Solymosi (Hungary)

7 August 2019	Vasas (Hungary)	5–2	Soroksár (Hungary)	2019–20 Nemzeti Bajnokság II (First match)
19:00	Balajti 42' 61' 88'; Szatmári 69'; Hinora 72'	Report	18' Gárdos; 22' Huszák	Attendance: T.B.A. Referee: Szabolcs Szilasi (Hungary)

11 July 2019	Budapest Honvéd (Hungary)	3–1	(Lithuania) Žalgiris	First UEFA Europa League match
21:00	Banó-Szabó 32'; Ngog 55'; Gazdag 69' (pen.)	Report	Uzėla 90+2'	Attendance: 3,622; Referee: Boris Marhefka (Slovakia)

== Attendances ==
As of 11 April 2017.

Season	Average
2018–19	TBA
