= Donát Szivacski =

Hungarian footballer

Personal information
- Date of birth: 18 January 1997 (age 29)
- Place of birth: Szeged, Hungary
- Height: 1.87 m (6 ft 2 in)
- Position: Defensive midfielder

Team information
- Current team: Szentlőrinci
- Number: 2

Youth career
- 2008–2012: Tisza Volán
- 2012: Honvéd
- 2012–2014: Kecskemét

Senior career*
Years	Team	Apps	(Gls)
2014–2015	Kecskemét	7	(0)
2015–2024	Vasas SC	188	(3)
2015	→ BFC Siófok (loan)	12	(0)
2024	→ Mezőkövesd (loan)	13	(0)
2024–	Szentlőrinci	42	(0)

International career^{‡}
2014–2015	Hungary U-18	7	(0)
2015	Hungary U-19	7	(1)
2016–2018	Hungary U-21	14	(0)
- * Club domestic league appearances and goals as of 31 May 2026 ‡ National team caps and goals as of 16 October 2018

Donát Szivacski (born 18 January 1997) is a Hungarian football player who plays for Szentlőrinci.

== Career statistics ==
Appearances and goals by club, season and competition
Club	Season	League			Cup		League Cup		Europe		Total	
Club	Season	Division	Apps	Goals	Apps	Goals	Apps	Goals	Apps	Goals	Apps	Goals
Kecskemét	2014–15	Nemzeti Bajnokság I	9	0	0	0	5	0	0	0	14	0
Siófok (loan)	2015–16	Nemzeti Bajnokság II	13	0	0	0	0	0	0	0	13	0
Vasas	2015–16	Nemzeti Bajnokság I	10	0	0	0	0	0	0	0	10	0
Vasas	2016–17	Nemzeti Bajnokság I	21	0	3	0	0	0	0	0	24	0
Vasas	2017–18	Nemzeti Bajnokság I	19	1	0	0	0	0	2	0	21	1
Vasas	2018–19	Nemzeti Bajnokság II	17	0	0	0	0	0	0	0	17	0
Vasas	Total		67	1	3	0	0	0	2	0	72	1
Career total			89	1	3	0	5	0	2	0	99	1

Updated to games played as of 17 February 2019.
