= Szabolcs Szilágyi =

Romanian professional footballer

Personal information
- Full name: Szabolcs Krisztián Szilágyi
- Date of birth: 23 September 2003 (age 23)
- Place of birth: Cluj-Napoca, Romania
- Height: 1.83 m (6 ft 0 in)
- Position: Midfielder

Team information
- Current team: Unirea Slobozia (on loan from FK Csíkszereda)
- Number: 16

Youth career
- 2010–2020: CFR Cluj
- 2020: Fehérvár
- 2020–2022: Vasas

Senior career*
Years	Team	Apps	(Gls)
2021–2025	Vasas	39	(2)
2022–2024	Vasas II	4	(0)
2024	→ Mezőkövesd (loan)	7	(0)
2024–2025	→ FK Csíkszereda (loan)	18	(1)
2025–	FK Csíkszereda	5	(0)
2026	→ Szentlőrinc (loan)	8	(0)
2026–	→ Unirea Slobozia (loan)	12	(0)

International career^{‡}
2023–2024	Romania U20	6	(0)
- * Club domestic league appearances and goals as of 31 October 2026 ‡ National team caps and goals as of 21 March 2024

Szabolcs Krisztián Szilágyi (born 23 September 2003) is a Romanian professional footballer who plays as a midfielder for Liga II club Unirea Slobozia, on loan from Liga I club FK Csíkszereda.

== International career ==
Szilágyi has represented Romania at under-20 level.

== Personal life ==
Born in Cluj-Napoca, Szilágyi is of Hungarian ethnicity.
