= Kenneth Otigba =

Hungarian association football player

Kenny Otigba
Personal information
- Full name: Kenneth Karim Otigba
- Date of birth: 29 August 1992 (age 34)
- Place of birth: Kaduna, Nigeria
- Height: 1.87 m (6 ft 2 in)
- Position: Centre back

Team information
- Current team: Vasas
- Number: 34

Youth career
- 2000–2004: Gyula
- 2004–2008: Békéscsaba
- 2008–2012: Heerenveen

Senior career*
Years	Team	Apps	(Gls)
2012–2017	Heerenveen	82	(8)
2016–2017	→ Kasımpaşa (loan)	15	(1)
2017–2020	Ferencváros	39	(1)
2020–	Vasas	127	(13)

International career^{‡}
2010	Hungary U19	1	(0)
2012–2014	Hungary U21	6	(0)
2018	Hungary	2	(0)
- * Club domestic league appearances and goals as of 31 May 2026 ‡ National team caps and goals as of 16:21, 24 March 2019 (UTC)

Kenneth Karim Otigba (born 29 August 1992) is a professional footballer who last played for Vasas as a centre back.

== Club career ==
=== Heerenveen ===
Otigba was born in Kaduna, Nigeria. He made his debut for SC Heerenveen on 16 December 2012 against Utrecht, coming on a 75th-minute substitute in a 3–1 loss.

On 30 August 2014, Otigba gave an assist to Mark Uth to beat FC Utrecht 3–1 in the 2014–15 Eredivisie. On 13 December 2014, Otigba gave an assist to Uth to beat NAC Breda 2–0 at the Rat Verlegh Stadion in Breda, Netherlands in the 2014–15 Eredivisie. On 7 January 2015, Otigba was chosen to be in the best team of December of the 2014–15 Eredivisie.

In August 2016, Otigba joined Kasımpaşa S.K. on loan for the 2016–17 with an option for Kasımpaşa to sign him permanently.

=== Ferencváros ===
On 5 June 2017, it was announced that an agreement was reached between SC Heerenveen and Ferencvárosi TC in connection with the signing of Otigba. By signing Otigba, Ferencváros ended a two-year long project since on 14 December 2015 it was announced that Ferencváros showed interest in signing him.

On 16 June 2020, he became champion with Ferencváros by beating Budapest Honvéd FC at the Hidegkuti Nándor Stadion on the 30th match day of the 2019–20 Nemzeti Bajnokság I season.

== International career ==
Having represented Hungary U-21 as a youth player, he refused Pál Dárdai's invitation to represent Hungary at the adult team saying he would choose Nigeria instead. However, in 2018, he reconsidered himself and chose to play for the national team, making his debut in the friendly match against Kazakhstan.

== Personal life ==
Otigba was born in Nigeria to a Hungarian mother and a Nigerian father, he moved to Hungary with his mother at age five and spent his childhood in Gyula. Otigba said in an interview with the Hungarian Nemzeti Sport that "I'm a very lucky chap" when he was asked about his partner, Dutch singer and model Sanne Verbeek, a.k.a. Ayden. Verbeek participated in the X Factor in 2013.

== Career statistics ==
As of 3 February 2023

Appearances and goals by club, season and competition
Club	Season	League		Cup		Europe		Other		Total	
Club	Season	Apps	Goals	Apps	Goals	Apps	Goals	Apps	Goals	Apps	Goals
Heerenveen	2011–12	0	0	0	0	—		0	0	0	0
Heerenveen	2012–13	3	0	1	0	—		1	0	5	0
Heerenveen	2013–14	24	5	3	0	—		1	0	28	5
Heerenveen	2014–15	24	0	1	0	—		4	0	29	0
Heerenveen	2015–16	31	3	3	0	—		—		34	3
Heerenveen	Total	82	8	8	0	0	0	6	0	96	8
Kasımpaşa	2016–17	15	1	5	2	—		—		20	3
Ferencváros	2017–18	24	1	1	0	1	0	—		26	1
Ferencváros	2018–19	3	0	2	0	—		—		5	0
Ferencváros	2019–20	12	0	0	0	—		—		12	0
Ferencváros	Total	39	1	3	0	1	0	0	0	43	1
Vasas	2020–21	13	4	0	0	0	0	—		13	4
Vasas	2021–22	25	4	1	0	0	0	—		26	4
Vasas	2022–23	22	1	2	1	0	0	—		24	2
Vasas	Total	60	9	3	1	0	0	0	0	63	10
Career total		196	19	19	3	1	0	6	0	222	22
