= Dávid Zimonyi =

Hungarian footballer

Personal information
- Date of birth: 24 December 1997 (age 28)
- Place of birth: Kimle, Hungary
- Height: 1.70 m (5 ft 7 in)
- Position: Forward

Team information
- Current team: Videoton
- Number: 23

Youth career
- 2006–2008: Kimle KSE
- 2008–2013: Mosonmagyaróvár

Senior career*
Years	Team	Apps	(Gls)
2013–2020	Lipót	19	(14)
2020–2022	Zalaegerszeg	40	(7)
2022	→ Vasas (loan)	12	(2)
2022–2024	Vasas	28	(3)
2024	Paks	10	(0)
2025–2026	Vasas	11	(1)
2026–	Videoton	5	(0)
- * Club domestic league appearances and goals as of 31 May 2026

Dávid Zimonyi (born 24 December 1997) is a Hungarian professional footballer who plays as a forward for Nemzeti Bajnokság II club Videoton.

== Club career ==
On 14 February 2022, Zimonyi joined Vasas on loan until the end of the season, with an obligation for Vasas to buy his rights in case of promotion. Vasas achieved the promotion, and the club bought out his rights.
