= Zsombor Berecz (footballer) =

Hungarian footballer (born 1995)

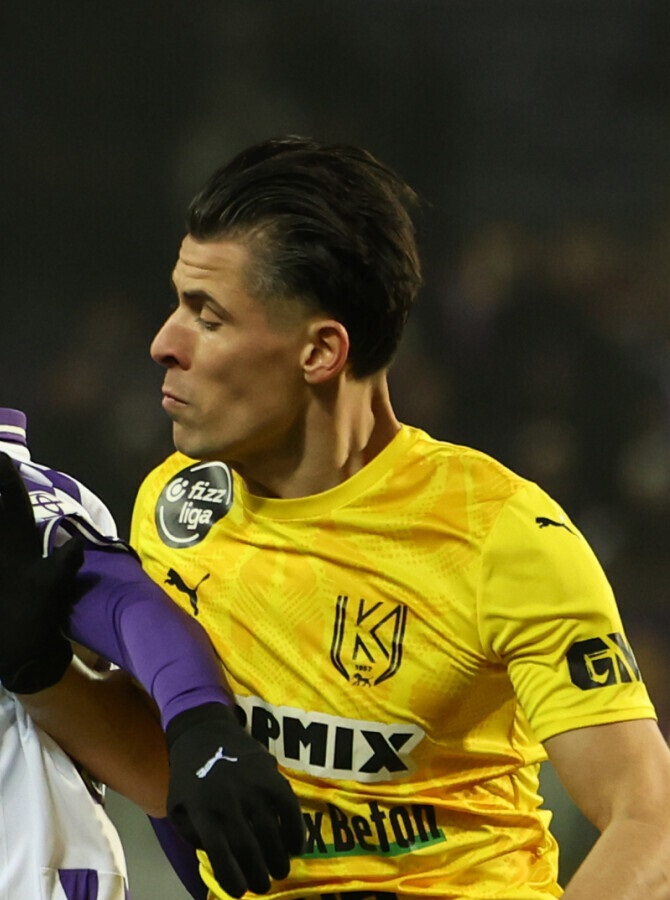
- Berecz playing for Kazincbarcika in 2025

Personal information
- Date of birth: 13 December 1995 (age 30)
- Place of birth: Miskolc, Hungary
- Height: 1.80 m (5 ft 11 in)
- Position: Midfielder

Team information
- Current team: Kazincbarcika
- Number: 8

Youth career
- 2006–2009: Diósgyőr
- 2009–2012: Vasas

Senior career*
Years	Team	Apps	(Gls)
2012–2018	Vasas	136	(15)
2018–2020	Fehérvár	9	(0)
2019–2020	→ Mezőkövesd (loan)	28	(4)
2020–2021	Mezőkövesd	21	(4)
2021–2025	Vasas	103	(17)
2025–	Kazincbarcika	14	(0)

International career^{‡}
2014	Hungary U19	1	(0)
2014–2015	Hungary U20	6	(0)
2015–2016	Hungary U21	3	(1)
2016	Hungary	1	(0)
- * Club domestic league appearances and goals as of 30 May 2026 ‡ National team caps and goals as of 17 November 2016

Zsombor Berecz (born 13 December 1995) is a Hungarian professional footballer who plays as a midfielder for Nemzeti Bajnokság I club Kazincbarcika. He was also part of the Hungarian U-20 team at the 2015 FIFA U-20 World Cup.

== International career ==
In November 2016 Berecz received his first call-up to the senior Hungary squad for matches against Andorra and Sweden.

== Career statistics ==
Appearances and goals by club, season and competition
Club	Season	League			Cup		League Cup		Europe		Total	
Club	Season	Division	Apps	Goals	Apps	Goals	Apps	Goals	Apps	Goals	Apps	Goals
Vasas	2012–13	Nemzeti Bajnokság II	2	0	2	1	—		—		4	1
Vasas	2013–14	Nemzeti Bajnokság II	22	4	0	0	4	1	—		26	5
Vasas	2014–15	Nemzeti Bajnokság II	27	2	1	0	3	0	—		31	2
Vasas	2015–16	Nemzeti Bajnokság I	29	0	3	1	—		—		32	1
Vasas	2016–17	Nemzeti Bajnokság I	32	6	9	4	—		—		41	10
Vasas	2017–18	Nemzeti Bajnokság I	24	3	2	0	—		—		26	3
Vasas	Total		136	15	17	6	7	1	—		160	22
MOL Vidi	2018–19	Nemzeti Bajnokság I	9	0	5	0	—		1	0	15	0
Mezőkövesd	2019–20	Nemzeti Bajnokság I	28	4	9	2	—		—		37	6
Mezőkövesd	2020–21	Nemzeti Bajnokság I	21	4	3	3	—		—		24	7
Mezőkövesd	Total		49	8	12	5	—		0	0	61	13
Career total			194	23	34	11	7	1	1	0	236	35

Updated to games played as of 15 January 2021.
