= Máté Vida =

Hungarian footballer

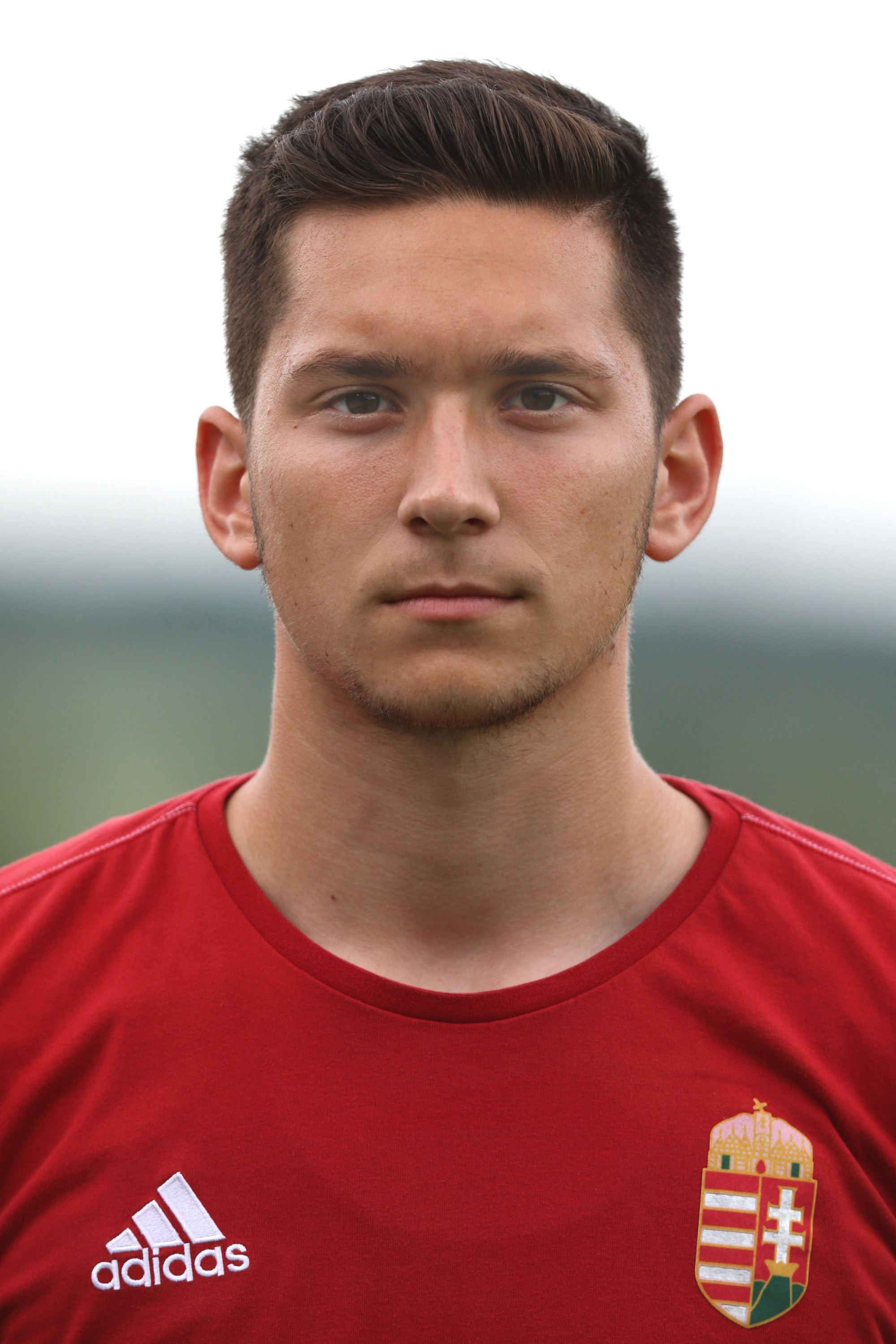
- Vida in 2017

Personal information
- Date of birth: 8 March 1996 (age 30)
- Place of birth: Budapest, Hungary
- Height: 1.82 m (6 ft 0 in)
- Position: Defensive midfielder

Team information
- Current team: Karcagi
- Number: 8

Youth career
- Soltvadkerti TE
- 2008–2013: Vasas

Senior career*
Years	Team	Apps	(Gls)
2013–2018	Vasas	122	(4)
2018–2021	DAC Dunajská Streda	53	(2)
2021–2025	Vasas	21	(0)
2022–2025	Vasas II	8	(3)
2025–	Karcagi	8	(0)

International career^{‡}
2014	Hungary U19	1	(0)
2015	Hungary U20	5	(0)
2015–2018	Hungary U21	18	(2)
2016–2019	Hungary	6	(0)
- * Club domestic league appearances and goals as of 31 May 2026 ‡ National team caps and goals as of 29 November 2019

Máté Vida (born 8 March 1996) is a Hungarian football player who plays for Karcagi.

== Club career ==
Vida joined Slovak club DAC Dunajská Streda in 2018.

On 20 August 2021, he returned to Vasas.

== International career ==
He was also part of the Hungarian U-20 team at the 2015 FIFA U-20 World Cup.

== Career statistics ==
=== Club ===
Appearances and goals by club, season and competition
Club	Season	League			Cup		League Cup		Europe		Total	
Club	Season	Division	Apps	Goals	Apps	Goals	Apps	Goals	Apps	Goals	Apps	Goals
Vasas	2013–14	Nemzeti Bajnokság I	15	0	0	0	3	0	-	-	18	0
Vasas	2014–15	Nemzeti Bajnokság I	22	1	1	0	4	1	-	-	27	2
Vasas	2015–16	Nemzeti Bajnokság I	31	1	1	0	0	0	0	0	32	1
Vasas	2016–17	Nemzeti Bajnokság I	11	1	0	0	0	0	0	0	11	1
Career total			79	3	2	0	7	1	0	0	88	4

=== International ===
As of match played 6 September 2016

National team	Season	Apps	Goals
Hungary	2016	3	0
Total		3	0
