= 2021–22 Nemzeti Bajnokság II =

Nemzeti Bajnokság II
- Season: 2021–22
- Champions: Vasas
- Promoted: Vasas; Kecskemét
- Relegated: Szolnok; Budaörs; III. Kerület
- All statistics correct as of 4 August 2021.

The 2021–22 Nemzeti Bajnokság II (also known as 2021–22 Merkantil Bank Liga) was Hungary's 71st season of the Nemzeti Bajnokság II, the second tier of the Hungarian football league system. The season began in July 2021.

== Teams ==
The following teams have changed division since the 2020–21 season.

=== Team changes ===
==== To NB II ====
Relegated from 2020–21 Nemzeti Bajnokság I	Promoted from 2020–21 Nemzeti Bajnokság III
▼ Diósgyőr ▼ Budafok	▲ Tiszakécske (East) ▲ Kecskemét (Centre) ▲III. Kerület(West)

Although Iváncsa KSE finished 1st in the 2020-21 Nemzeti Bajnokság III Centre group, Kecskeméti TE were promoted.

==== From NB II ====
Promoted to 2021–22 Nemzeti Bajnokság I	Relegated to 2021–22 Nemzeti Bajnokság III
▲ Debrecen ▲ Gyirmót	▼ Kazincbarcika (East) ▼ Kaposvári Rákóczi (West) ▼ Debreceni EAC (East)

=== Stadium and locations ===
Location of teams in 2020–21 Nemzeti Bajnokság II
Location of Budapest teams.

Following is the list of clubs competing in the league this season, with their location, stadium and stadium capacity.

Team	Location	Stadium	Capacity	2019–20
III. Kerület	Budapest			
Ajka	Ajka	Városi Stadion	5,000	9th
Békéscsaba	Békéscsaba	Kórház utcai Stadion	2,479	15th
Csákvár	Csákvár	Tersztyánszky Ödön Stadion	2,020	4th
Budaörs	Budaörs	Árok utcai Stadion	604	11th
Dorog	Dorog	Buzánszky Jenő Stadion	5,000	13th
Győr	Győr	ETO Park	15,600	6th
Kecskemét	Kecskemét	Széktói Stadion		
Nyíregyháza	Nyíregyháza	Városi Stadion	10,300	8th
Pécs	Pécs	Stadion PMFC	7,000	1st (NB III, Central)
Siófok	Siófok	Révész Géza utcai Stadion	6,500	5th
Soroksár	Budapest (Soroksár)	Szamosi Mihály Sportelep	5,000	10th
Szeged-Csanád	Szeged	Szent Gellért Fórum	8,136	12th
Szentlőrinc	Szentlőrinc	Szentlőrinci Sportpálya	1,020	2nd (NB III, Central)
Szolnok	Szolnok	Tiszaligeti Stadion	3,437	16th
Szombathelyi Haladás	Szombathely	Haladás Sportkomplexum	8,940	17th
Tiszakécske	Tiszakécske			17th
Vasas	Budapest (Angyalföld)	Illovszky Rudolf Stadion	5,154	3rd

=== Personnel and kits ===
Team	Head coach	Captain	Kit manufacturer	Shirt sponsor
Ajka	(Hungary) Károly Kis	(Hungary) Zoltán Kenderes	Zeus	–
Békéscsaba	(Hungary) Sándor Preisinger	(Hungary) Sándor Nagy	Saller	Békés Drén
Budaörs	(Hungary) Tibor Márkus		Ziccer	Volkswagen
Csákvár	(Hungary) Ede Visinka		2Rule	Euroaszfalt
Dorog	(Hungary) Szabolcs Németh	(Hungary) Áron Mészáros	Adidas	Pannon Falap-Lemez
Győri ETO	(Hungary) Barna Dobos		Adidas	WKW
Nyíregyháza	(Hungary) György Gálhidi	(Hungary) Ferenc Fodor	Jako	Révész
Pécs	(Hungary) László Vas	(Hungary) Zsombor Futó	Macron	–
Siófok	(Hungary) István Gál		Nike	HunGast
Soroksár	(Hungary) Péter Lipcsei		Nike	Soroksár District
Szeged-Csanád	(Hungary) Barna Dobos	(Hungary) Tamás Germán	hummel	–
Szentlőrinc	(Slovakia) Marián Sluka		Macron	–
Szolnok	(Hungary) József Csábi		hummel	–
Szombathelyi Haladás	(Hungary) János Mátyus		2Rule	–
Vasas	(Hungary) Szabolcs Schindler		Adidas	Alprosys

=== Managerial changes ===
Team	Outgoing manager	Manner of departure	Date of vacancy	Position in table	Incoming manager	Date of appointment	Ref.
Debreceni VSC	(Hungary) Elemér Kondás	Sacked	16 February 2021	1st	(Hungary) Szabolcs Huszti	16 February 2021	

== League table ==
Pos	Team	Pld	W	D	L	GF	GA	GD	Pts	Promotion or relegation
1	Vasas (P, C)	38	25	10	3	80	22	+58	85	Promotion to Nemzeti Bajnokság I
2	Kecskemét (P)	38	23	8	7	75	36	+39	77	Promotion to Nemzeti Bajnokság I
3	Diósgyőr	38	21	9	8	57	40	+17	72	
4	Szeged	38	19	9	10	64	34	+30	66	
5	Siófok	38	15	14	9	42	37	+5	59	
6	Szombathelyi Haladás	38	16	9	13	37	30	+7	57	
7	Győr	38	16	8	14	57	46	+11	56	
8	Soroksár	38	14	10	14	67	61	+6	52	
9	Ajka	38	14	9	15	49	49	0	51	
10	Nyíregyháza	38	13	11	14	45	51	−6	50	
11	Pécs	38	12	12	14	38	39	−1	48	
12	Csákvár	38	10	13	15	52	57	−5	43	
13	Tiszakécske	38	12	6	20	41	65	−24	42	
14	Budafok	38	11	9	18	39	50	−11	42	
15	Békéscsaba	38	10	12	16	53	69	−16	42	
16	Szentlőrinc	38	10	12	16	39	57	−18	42	
17	Dorog	38	11	8	19	35	60	−25	41	
18	Szolnok (R)	38	9	11	18	35	55	−20	38	Relegation to Nemzeti Bajnokság III
19	Budaörs (R)	38	8	14	16	40	61	−21	38	Relegation to Nemzeti Bajnokság III
20	III. Kerület (R)	38	9	10	19	36	62	−26	37	Relegation to Nemzeti Bajnokság III

Source: MLSZ (in Hungarian), Soccerway
Rules for classification: 1) Points; 2) Head-to-head points; 3) Head-to-head goal difference; 4) Head-to-head goals scored; 5) Head-to-head away goals scored; 6) Goal difference; 7) Goals scored.
(C) Champions; (P) Promoted; (R) Relegated

== Statistics ==
=== Number of teams by counties and regions ===
Number of teams by counties
Pos.	County (megye)	No. of teams	Teams
1	Baranya	2	Pécs and Szentlőrinc
1	Budapest (capital)	2	Soroksár and Vasas
1	Győr-Moson-Sopron	2	Gyirmót and Győr
1	Hajdú-Bihar	2	Debreceni EAC and Debreceni VSC
1	Somogy	2	Kaposvár and Siófok
2	Békés	1	Békéscsaba
2	Borsod-Abaúj-Zemplén	1	Kazincbarcika
2	Csongrád-Csanád	1	Szeged-Csanád
2	Fejér	1	Csákvár
2	Jász-Nagykun-Szolnok	1	Szolnok
2	Komárom-Esztergom	1	Dorog
2	Pest	1	Budaörs
2	Szabolcs-Szatmár-Bereg	1	Nyíregyháza
2	Vas	1	Szombathelyi Haladás
2	Veszprém	1	Ajka

Number of teams by regions
Transdanubia	Central Hungary	Great Plain and North
Ajka; Csákvár; Dorog; Győr; Pécs; Siófok; Szentlőrinc; Szombathelyi Haladás	III. Kerület; Budaörs; Kecskemét; Soroksár; Vasas	Békéscsaba; Nyíregyháza; Szeged-Csanád; Szolnok; Tiszakécske
8 Teams	5 Teams	5 Teams

== See also ==
- 2021–22 Magyar Kupa
- 2021–22 Nemzeti Bajnokság I
- 2021–22 Nemzeti Bajnokság III
- 2021–22 Megyei Bajnokság I
