= Szentlőrinci SE =

Hungarian football club

Szentlőrinc SE
- Full name: Szentlőrinci Sportegyesület
- Founded: 1912; 114 years ago
- Ground: Szentlőrinc SE Sporttelep
- Capacity: 1,020
- Chairman: Ferenc Tóth
- Manager: Róbert Waltner
- League: NB II
- 2025–26: NB II, 14th of 16
- Website: https://www.szentlorincse.hu/
Home colours	Away colours

Szentlőrinci Sportegyesület is a professional football club based in Szentlőrinc, Baranya county, Hungary. The team set to compete in the Nemzeti Bajnokság II from 2024–25, the second tier of Hungarian football after promotion from Nemzeti Bajnokság III in 2023–24.

== Name changes ==
- 1912–1948: Szentlőrinci Vasutas SE
- 1948–1998: Szentlőrinci Sportegyesület
- 1998–2009: Szentlőrinc-Ormánság Takarékszövetkezet SE
- 2009–2010: Szentlőrinc-Pécsi Vasutas Sportkör SE
- 2010–present: Szentlőrinci Sportegyesület
- 2020-present: Szentlőrinc (just the first team's name)

== History ==
On 16 June 2020, the club were promoted to the Nemzeti Bajnokság II since 2019-20 Nemzeti Bajnokság III-winner Érdi VSE did not want to be promoted to the second tier of the Hungarian League system.

On 9 June 2024, Szentlőrinc secure promotion to NB II from 2024–25 after defeat Putnok 2–0 and win aggregate 3–1 in 2023–24 NB III promotion play-off, the club return to second tier after a year absence.

== Honours ==
- Nemzeti Bajnokság III
  - Winners (4): 2005–06, 2007–08, 2008–09, 2023–24

== Current squad ==
As of 20 January 2026.

Note: Flags indicate national team as defined under FIFA eligibility rules; some limited exceptions apply. Players may hold more than one non-FIFA nationality.

No.	Pos.	Nation	Player
2	DF	HUN	Donát Szivacski
3	DF	HUN	Levente Márta
7	MF	HUN	Márk Lakatos
8	MF	SRB	Aleksandar Rac
9	FW	HUN	Máté Adamcsek
10	MF	HUN	Patrik Nyári
11	MF	HUN	István Harsányi
14	MF	SVK	Máté Szolgai
16	MF	HUN	Andreas Böcking
18	MF	ROU	Szabolcs Szilágyi (on loan from Csíkszereda)
19	FW	CRO	Marino Žeravica (on loan from Osijek)
21	DF	HUN	Péter Kiss-Szemán
22	DF	HUN	Gergő Bolla
23	FW	CAN	Nathaniel Lawrenzo

No.	Pos.	Nation	Player
27	DF	SRB	Lazar Milovanovic
33	DF	HUN	Olivér Dinnyés
39	MF	HUN	Marcell Herczeg
40	FW	HUN	Ábris Sámson
42	DF	HUN	Patrik Poór
44	GK	HUN	Márton Gyurján
47	MF	HUN	Ádám Décsy
67	MF	HUN	Erik Czérna
69	DF	HUN	Bálint Ignácz
70	FW	HUN	Imre Tollár
74	GK	HUN	Martin Auerbach
77	MF	HUN	Bence Kocsis
86	MF	HUN	Patrik Weiz
90	GK	HUN	Rajmund Kostyák

=== Out on loan ===
Note: Flags indicate national team as defined under FIFA eligibility rules; some limited exceptions apply. Players may hold more than one non-FIFA nationality.

No.	Pos.	Nation	Player
7	FW	HUN	Raul Csörgő (at Pécs until 30 June 2026)
66	FW	HUN	Ákos Tarcson (at Kaposvár until 30 June 2026)

No.	Pos.	Nation	Player
—	DF	HUN	Patrik Stifter (at Kaposvár until 30 June 2026)

== Seasons ==
The table below shows the seasons of Szentlőrinc SE.

Season	Tier	Club's name	Position	Pts
1947–48	4	Szentlőrinci Vasutas SE	5 / 8	12
1948–49	5	Szentlőrinci SE	8 / 11	14
1949–50	5	Szentlőrinci SE	4 / 10	10
1950	5	Szentlőrinci NSE	12 / 12	-
1951	4	Szentlőrinc	0 / 6	
1952	4	Szentlőrinc	0 / 8	
1954	5	Szentlőrinc	3 / 9	10
1955	4	Szentlőrinc	7 / 10	14
1956	4	Szentlőrinc	0 / 13	
1957	4	Szentlőrinc	1 / 9	25
1957–58	4	Szentlőrinc	12 / 15	15
1958–59	4	Szentlőrinc	16 / 16	1
1959–60	5	Szentlőrinc	8 / 11	16
1960–61	5	Szentlőrinc	1 / 11	29
1961–62	5	Szentlőrinc	6 / 12	5
1962–63	6	Szentlőrinc	0 / 10	
1963	7	Szentlőrinc	3 / 5	11
1964	7	Szentlőrinc	2 / 7	16
1965	6	Szentlőrinc	9 / 10	4
1966	7	Szentlőrinc	0 / 10	
1968	7	Szentlőrinc	7 / 9	10
1969	7	Szentlőrinc	2 / 9	18
1970–71	7	Szentlőrinc	5 / 9	18
1971–72	7	Szentlőrinc	0 / 7	
1972–73	6	Szentlőrinc	6 / 14	26
1973–74	6	Szentlőrinc	8 / 16	26
1974–75	5	Szentlőrinc	7 / 16	32
1975–76	5	Szentlőrinc	13 / 16	22
1976–77	6	Szentlőrinc	6 / 14	28
1977–78	5	Szentlőrinc	5 / 14	31
1978–79	4	Szentlőrinc	9 / 16	29
1979–80	4	Szentlőrinc	0 / 14	
1980–81	4	Szentlőrinc	2 / 16	42
1981–82	5	Szentlőrinc	1 / 16	49
1982–83	4	Szentlőrinc	8 / 18	37
1983–84	4	Szentlőrinc	17 / 18	17
1984–85	5	Szentlőrinci ÁFÉSZ SE	1 / 16	52
1985–86	4	Szentlőrinc	16 / 19	26
1986–87	4	Szentlőrinc	14 / 18	29
1987–88	4	Szentlőrinc	13 / 16	20
1988–89	4	Szentlőrinc	15 / 16	19
1989–90	4	Szentlőrinc	14 / 16	18
1990–91	4	Szentlőrinc	16 / 16	14
1991–92	5	Szentlőrinc	2 / 16	46
1992–93	5	Szentlőrinc	3 / 16	38
1993–94	5	Szentlőrinc	1 / 17	56
1994–95	4	Szentlőrinci SE	12 / 16	36
1995–96	4	Szentlőrinci SE	15 / 16	19
1996–97	5	Szentlőrinc	1 / 16	76
1997–98	5	Szentlőrinc	15 / 18	21
1998–99	5	Szentlőrinc	13 / 16	28
1999–00	5	Szentlőrinc	1 / 16	66
2000	3	Szetlőrinc	3 / 8	22
2000–01	4	Szentlőrinci SE	2 / 11	52
2001–02	4	Szentlőrinc SE	2 / 14	58
2002–03	4	Szentlőrinc SE	2 / 16	67
2003–04	4	Szentlőrinc SE	1 / 16	80
2004–05	3	Szentlőrinc	11 / 16	41
2005–06	3	Szentlõrinc-Ormánság Takarékszövetkezet SE	1 / 16	74
2006–07	3	Szentlőrinc SE	3 / 14	56
2007–08	3	Szentlőrinci SE	1 / 18	83
2008–09	3	Szentlőrinci SE	1 / 16	74
2009–10	3	Szentlőrinc-PVSK SE	3 / 14	49
2010–11	3	Szentlőrinc SE	2 / 16	67
2011–12	3	Szentlőrinc SE	5 / 15	52
2012–13	3	Szentlőrinc SE	4 / 14	42
2013–14	4	Szentlőrinc SE	1 / 16	80
2014–15	3	Szentlőrinc SE	13 / 16	33
2015–16	3	Szentlőrinc SE	8 / 17	44
2016–17	3	Szentlőrinc SE	8 / 18	47
2017–18	3	Szentlőrinc SE	7 / 16	44
2018–19	3	Szentlőrinc SE	2 / 16	63
2019–20	3	Szentlőrinc SE	2 / 16	44
2020–21	2	Szentlőrinc SE	16 / 20	42
2021–22	2	Szentlőrinc SE	16 / 20	42
2022–23	2	Szentlőrinc SE	17 / 20	39
2023–24	3	Szentlőrinc SE	1 / 16	75
2024–25	2	Szentlőrinc SE	5 / 16	47
2025–26	2	Szentlőrinc SE	14 / 16	33
