= 2015–16 Újpest FC season =

Újpest FC
2015–16 season
- Chairman: Roderick Duchâtelet
- Manager: Nebojša Vignjević
- Stadium: Ferenc Szusza Stadium
- OTP Bank Liga: 6th
- Hungarian Cup: Runners-up
- Top goalscorer: League: Mbaye Diagne (11); All: Enis Bardhi (12)
- Highest home attendance: 8,445 (vs Ferencváros, 09 September 2015)
- Lowest home attendance: 1,048 (vs Paks, 20 April 2016)
Home colours	Away colours

The 2015–16 season was Újpest Football Club's 110th competitive season, 104th consecutive season in the Nemzeti Bajnokság I and 130th year in existence as a football club.

== First Team Squad ==
As of 14 March 2016.

Squad No.	Name	Nationality	Position	Date of birth (age)
Goalkeepers
1	Szabolcs Balajcza	(Hungary)	GK	14 July 1979 (age 47)
23	Dávid Banai	(Hungary)	GK	9 May 1994 (age 32)
32	Zoltán Kovács	(Hungary)	GK	29 October 1984 (age 41)
Defenders
2	Tibor Nagy	(Hungary)	RB	14 August 1991 (age 35)
3	Jonathan Heris	(Belgium)	CB / DM	3 September 1990 (age 36)
4	Dávid Kálnoki-Kis	(Hungary)	CB / RB	6 August 1991 (age 35)
5	Róbert Litauszki	(Hungary)	CB / LB / RB	15 March 1990 (age 36)
13	Dávid Mohl	(Hungary)	LB / LM	22 April 1985 (age 41)
15	Ákos Kecskés	(Hungary)	CB	4 January 1996 (age 30)
30	Péter Bauer	(Hungary)	CB	9 March 1998 (age 28)
Midfielders
6	József Windecker	(Hungary)	DM	2 December 1992 (age 33)
8	Balázs Balogh	(Hungary)	DM / LB / LM	11 June 1990 (age 36)
14	Gábor Nagy	(Hungary)	RM / AM / CM	16 October 1985 (age 40)
18	Bojan Sanković	(Montenegro)	DM / CM	21 November 1993 (age 32)
20	Souleymane Diarra	(Mali)	CM	30 January 1995 (age 31)
21	Benjamin Balázs	(Hungary)	LW / AM / RW	26 April 1990 (age 36)
26	Benjámin Cseke	(Hungary)	LM	22 July 1994 (age 32)
27	Bence Pávkovics	(Hungary)	CM	27 March 1997 (age 29)
29	Enis Bardhi	(North Macedonia)	LW / RW / CF	2 July 1995 (age 31)
88	Attila Filkor	(Hungary)	CM / DM / AM	12 July 1988 (age 38)
Strikers
7	Kylian Hazard	(Belgium)	AM	5 August 1995 (age 31)
9	László Lencse	(Hungary)	CF	2 July 1988 (age 38)
11	Mihailo Perović	(Montenegro)	CF	23 January 1997 (age 29)
17	Viktor Angelov	(North Macedonia)	CF	27 March 1994 (age 32)
19	Nemanja Andrić	(Serbia)	LW / RW	13 June 1987 (age 39)
22	Péter Kabát	(Hungary)	CF / AM / SS	25 September 1977 (age 48)
25	Zoltán Gere	(Hungary)	CF	13 June 1997 (age 29)
28	János Lázok	(Hungary)	CF	4 October 1984 (age 41)

== Transfers ==
=== In ===
==== Summer ====
Player	Nationality	Position	Age	Moving from	Transfer fee	Date
Zoltán Gubacsi	Hungary	Right back	19	(Hungary) Soproni VSE	End of loan	30 June 2015
Dávid Kálnoki-Kis	Hungary	Centre back	23	(Hungary) MTK Budapest FC	Free transfer	1 July 2015
Zoltán Kovács	Hungary	Goalkeeper	30	(Romania) FC Dinamo București	Free transfer	1 July 2015
József Windecker	Hungary	Defensive midfielder	22	(Hungary) Győri ETO FC	Free transfer	1 July 2015
Dániel Sallói	Hungary	Centre forward	19	(United States) Sporting Kansas City	Free transfer	1 July 2015
Attila Filkor	Hungary	Centre midfielder	27	(Italy) A.C. Milan	Free transfer	1 July 2015
Kylian Hazard	Belgium	Attacking midfielder	19	(Belgium) S.V. Zulte Waregem	Unknown	1 July 2015
Patrik Tóth	Hungary	Centre forward	18	(Hungary) Újpest FC U20		1 July 2015
Dávid Mohl	Hungary	Left back	30	(Hungary) Pécsi MFC	Free transfer	16 July 2015
Bence Pávkovics	Hungary	Central midfielder	18	(Hungary) Pécsi MFC	Free transfer	17 July 2015
Souleymane Diarra	Mali	Right midfielder	20	(Morocco) Wydad Casablanca	Unknown	26 August 2015
Benjamin Balázs	Hungary	Attacking midfielder	25	(Czech Republic) FK Teplice	Unknown	28 August 2015
Nemanja Andrić	Serbia	Left winger	28	(Hungary) Győri ETO FC	Free transfer	31 August 2015

==== Winter ====
Player	Nationality	Position	Age	Moving from	Transfer fee	Date
Péter Bauer	Hungary	Defender	17	(Hungary) Újpest FC U20	Free transfer	8 January 2016
Viktor Angelov	Macedonia	Centre forward	21	(North Macedonia) FK Metalurg Skopje	Free transfer	24 January 2016
Zoltán Gere	Hungary	Centre forward	18	(Hungary) Újpest FC U20	Free transfer	8 February 2016
János Lázok	Hungary	Attacking midfielder	31	(Hungary) Vasas SC	Free transfer	8 February 2016

=== Out ===
==== Summer ====
Player	Nationality	Position	Age	Moving to	Transfer fee	Date
Berat Ahmeti	Albania	Forward	20	(Albania) KF Vllaznia Shkodër	Free transfer	5 June 2015
Dávid Hudák	Slovakia	Defender	22	(Slovakia) ŠK Slovan Bratislava	End of loan	30 June 2015
Kim Ojo	Nigeria	Forward	26	(Belgium) K.R.C. Genk	End of loan	30 June 2015
Nemanja Andrić	Serbia	Midfielder	28	(Hungary) Győri ETO FC	End of loan	30 June 2015
János Nagy	Hungary	Defender	22	(Hungary) BFC Siófok	Free transfer	1 July 2015
Filip Stanisavljević	Serbia	Midfielder	28	(Greece) AÓ Plataniá	Free transfer	1 July 2015
Darwin Andrade	Colombia	Defender	24	(Belgium) Standard Liège	£1.40m	3 July 2015
Rodrigo Rojo	Uruguay	Midfielder	26	(Uruguay) Centro Atlético Fénix	Unknown	6 July 2015
Loïc Nego	France	Defender	24	(England) Charlton Athletic F.C.	End of loan	10 July 2015
Asmir Suljić	Bosnia	Midfielder	23	(Hungary) Videoton FC	Unknown	28 August 2015
Viktor Vadász	Hungary	Defender	29	Unknown	Released	31 August 2015

==== Winter ====
Player	Nationality	Position	Age	Moving to	Transfer fee	Date
Gyula Forró	Hungary	Defender	27	(Hungary) Puskás Akadémia FC	Free transfer	13 January 2016
Dániel Sallói	Hungary	Forward	19	(United States) Sporting Kansas City	Free transfer	15 January 2016
Mbaye Diagne	Senegal	Forward	24	(China) Tianjin Teda F.C.	£1.43m	4 February 2016
Falaye Sacko	Mali	Defensive midfielder	20	(Portugal) Vitória S.C.	Free transfer	4 February 2016

=== Loan In ===
==== Summer ====
Player	Nationality	Position	Age	Loaned From
Benjámin Cseke	Hungary	Left midfielder	21	(Hungary) MTK Budapest FC
Mbaye Diagne	Senegal	Centre forward	23	(Italy) Juventus FC
Ákos Kecskés	Hungary	Centre back	19	(Italy) Atalanta B.C.
Tibor Nagy	Hungary	Right back	24	(Hungary) MTK Budapest FC

==== Winter ====
Player	Nationality	Position	Age	Loaned To
László Lencse	Hungary	Striker	27	(Hungary) Puskás Akadémia FC

=== Loan Out ===
==== Winter ====
Player	Nationality	Position	Age	Loaned To
Patrik Tóth	Hungary	Centre forward	19	(Hungary) Budaörsi SC

== Statistics ==
=== Appearances and goals ===
Last updated: 7 May 2016.

No.	Pos.	Name	OTP Bank Liga		Hungarian Cup		Total		Discipline	
No.	Pos.	Name	Apps	Goals	Apps	Goals	Apps	Goals	Yellow card	Red card
1	GK	(Hungary) Szabolcs Balajcza	31	0	4	0	35	0	0	2
2	DF	(Hungary) Tibor Nagy	8 (1)	0	3	0	11 (1)	0	4	0
3	DF	(Belgium) Jonathan Heris	24	0	6	0	30	0	8	1
4	DF	(Hungary) Dávid Kálnoki-Kis	22	1	5	0	27	1	3	1
5	DF	(Hungary) Róbert Litauszki	29 (1)	1	7	0	36 (1)	1	9	0
6	MF	(Hungary) József Windecker	9 (3)	1	2	0	11 (3)	1	1	0
7	MF	(Belgium) Kylian Hazard	26 (3)	3	3 (4)	1	29 (7)	4	1	0
8	MF	(Hungary) Balázs Balogh	29 (1)	4	8	4	37 (1)	8	2	0
9	FW	(Hungary) László Lencse	12 (1)	3	3	2	15 (1)	5	0	0
11	FW	(Montenegro) Mihailo Perović	3 (5)	3	2 (1)	2	5 (6)	5	0	0
13	DF	(Hungary) Dávid Mohl	27 (3)	1	4 (2)	2	31 (5)	3	4	0
14	MF	(Hungary) Gábor Nagy	9 (2)	0	5	2	14 (2)	2	4	0
15	DF	(Hungary) Ákos Kecskés	7 (2)	0	6	0	13 (2)	0	2	0
17	FW	(North Macedonia) Viktor Angelov	5 (5)	0	0 (3)	0	5 (8)	0	2	0
18	DF	(Montenegro) Bojan Sanković	20 (2)	1	8	0	29 (2)	1	4	0
19	MF	(Serbia) Nemanja Andrić	19 (6)	4	5 (2)	3	24 (8)	7	2	0
20	MF	(Mali) Souleymane Diarra	7 (3)	0	3 (1)	0	10 (4)	0	7	0
21	MF	(Hungary) Benjamin Balázs	11 (2)	0	2 (3)	1	13 (5)	1	1	0
22	FW	(Hungary) Péter Kabát	1 (13)	1	5 (2)	7	6 (15)	8	2	0
23	GK	(Hungary) Dávid Banai	0 (1)	0	0	0	0 (1)	0	0	0
25	FW	(Hungary) Zoltán Gere	0	0	1	0	1	0	0	0
26	MF	(Hungary) Benjámin Cseke	4 (12)	0	7 (1)	3	11 (13)	3	2	0
27	MF	(Hungary) Bence Pávkovics	0	0	1	0	1	0	0	0
28	DF	(Hungary) Zoltán Gubacsi	0	0	0 (2)	0	0 (2)	0	0	0
29	MF	(North Macedonia) Enis Bardhi	23 (6)	6	4 (3)	6	27 (9)	12	4	0
32	GK	(Hungary) Zoltán Kovács	2	0	5	0	7	0	0	0
88	MF	(Hungary) Attila Filkor	3 (4)	0	2 (2)	0	5 (6)	0	0	0
-	FW	(Hungary) János Lázok	0	0	0	0	0	0	0	0
Loaned Out
24	FW	(Hungary) Patrik Tóth	1 (5)	1	1	1	2 (5)	2	1	0
No longer in team
25	DF	(Hungary) Viktor Vadász	1 (2)	0	0	0	1 (2)	0	0	0
99	MF	(Bosnia and Herzegovina) Asmir Suljić	5	0	0 (1)	3	5 (1)	3	1	0
17	DF	(Hungary) Gyula Forró	3 (1)	0	3	0	6 (1)	0	1	0
30	FW	(Hungary) Dániel Sallói	7 (5)	1	4 (1)	6	11 (6)	7	2	0
9	FW	(Senegal) Mbaye Diagne	13 (1)	11	0 (2)	0	13 (3)	11	5	0

=== Top scorers ===
Includes all competitive matches. The list is sorted by shirt number when total goals are equal.

Last updated on 1 May 2016

Position	Nation	Number	Name	OTP Bank Liga	Hungarian Cup	Total
1	(North Macedonia)	29	Enis Bardhi	6	6	12
2	(Senegal)	9	Mbaye Diagne	11	0	11
3	(Hungary)	8	Balázs Balogh	4	4	8
4	(Hungary)	22	Péter Kabát	1	7	8
5	(Serbia)	19	Nemanja Andrić	4	3	7
6	(Hungary)	30	Dániel Sallói	1	6	7
7	(Montenegro)	11	Mihailo Perović	3	2	5
8	(Hungary)	9	László Lencse	3	2	5
9	(Belgium)	7	Kylian Hazard	3	1	4
10	(Hungary)	13	Dávid Mohl	1	2	3
11	(Hungary)	26	Benjámin Cseke	0	3	3
12	(Bosnia and Herzegovina)	99	Asmir Suljić	0	3	3
13	(Hungary)	24	Patrik Tóth	1	1	2
14	(Hungary)	14	Gábor Nagy	0	2	2
15	(Montenegro)	18	Bojan Sanković	1	0	1
16	(Hungary)	6	József Windecker	1	0	1
17	(Hungary)	5	Róbert Litauszki	1	0	1
18	(Hungary)	4	Dávid Kálnoki-Kis	1	0	1
19	(Hungary)	21	Benjamin Balázs	0	1	1
/	/	/	Own Goals	2	1	3
			TOTALS	44	44	88

=== Overall ===
Games played	43 (33 OTP Bank Liga, 10 Hungarian Cup)
Games won	18 (11 OTP Bank Liga, 7 Hungarian Cup)
Games drawn	15 (13 OTP Bank Liga, 2 Hungarian Cup)
Games lost	10 (9 OTP Bank Liga, 1 Hungarian Cup)
Goals scored	88
Goals conceded	42
Goal difference	+46
Yellow cards	70
Red cards	4
Worst discipline	(Belgium) Jonathan Heris (8 (yellow card) , 1 (red card) )
Best result	14–1 (A) v Vértessomlói KSK – Hungarian Cup – 12–08–2015
Worst result	0–3 (A) v Videoton – OTP Bank Liga – 19–09–2015
Worst result	0–3 (H) v Videoton – OTP Bank Liga – 30–04–2016
Most appearances	(Hungary) Balázs Balogh (38 appearances)
Top scorers	(North Macedonia) Enis Bardhi (12 goals)
Points	46/99 (46.4%)

Last updated: 7 May 2016

== Friendlies ==
=== Pre-season ===
20 July 2015	Újpest	2 – 1	Újpest FC U21	Budapest, Pest County
11:00 CEST	Bacanin 18'; Nagy 37'	Report	Száraz 10'	Stadium: Szusza Ferenc Stadium

27 June 2015	Újpest	1 – 2	Békéscsaba	Budapest, Pest County
14:00 CEST	Heris 13'	Report	Borbély 24'; Prasler 73'	Stadium: Szusza Ferenc Stadium

1 July 2015	KAA Gent	0 – 1	Újpest	Ghent, Belgium
19:00 CEST		Report	Nego 90+3'	Stadium: Ghelamco Arena

4 July 2015	Sint-Truiden	2 – 2	Újpest	Sint-Truiden, Belgium
19:00 CEST	Mbombo 59'; Dompé 77'	Report	Hazard 35'; Sallói 39'	Stadium: Stayen

10 July 2015	Oostende	2 – 1	Újpest	Ostend, Belgium
19:00 CEST	Cornet 55'; Cyriac 59'	Report	Mabrouk 63'	Stadium: Albertpark

=== Mid-season ===
10 October 2015	Újpest	2 – 0	Siófok	Budapest, Pest County
11:00 CEST	Hazard 48'; Diagne 84'	Report		Stadium: Szusza Ferenc Stadium

6 November 2015	Újpest	1 – 2	Paks	Budapest, Pest County
13:00 CEST	Balázs 41'	Report	Bajner 14'; Frőhlich 77'	Stadium: Szusza Ferenc Stadium

13 November 2015	Újpest	2 – 2	Dunaújváros	Dunaújváros, Fejér County
13:00 CET	Mohl 44'; Diagne 70'; Kálnoki-Kis (red card) 88'	Report	Magasföldi 40', 90'	Stadium: Dunaferr Arena

20 January 2016	FC Wil 1900	2 – 1	Újpest	Turkey
15:00 CET	Koller 45'; Söylemezgiller 78'	Report	Andrić 59' (pen.)

23 January 2016	1. FC Nürnberg	2 – 1	Újpest	Turkey
15:00 CET	Stieber 32'; Burgstaller 86'	Report	Hazard 11'

26 January 2016	FC Steaua București	2 – 0	Újpest	Turkey
19:00 CET	Stanciu 32'; Stefănescu (yellow card) 80'; Popa 85'	Report

29 January 2016	FC Carl Zeiss Jena	3 – 0	Újpest	Turkey
15:00 CET	Buval 4'; Starke 36'; Wolfram 86'	Report

3 February 2016	Újpest	1 – 0	SzTK Erima	Budapest, Pest County
14:00 CET	Angelov 59'	Report		Stadium: Szusza Ferenc Stadium

== Nemzeti bajnokság I ==
=== Matches ===
18 July 2015 1	Újpest	0 – 0	Paks	Budapest, Pest County
18:00 CEST	Litauszki (yellow card) 42'; Kálnoki-Kis (yellow card) 32' (yellow-red card) 90+3'	Report	Gévay (yellow card) 28'; Bartha (yellow card) 50'; Bertus (yellow card) 53'	Stadium: Szusza Ferenc Stadium; Attendance: 2 637; Referee: (Hungary) Zsolt Szabó

25 July 2015 2	Vasas	1 – 3	Újpest	Budapest, Pest County
20:30 CEST	Remili 41'; Grúz (yellow card) 63'; Pajovic (yellow card) 49' (red card) 76'; Hangya (yellow card) 90+1'	Report	Mohl 30'; Heris (yellow card) 33'; Sallói 52'; Sanković 59', (yellow card) 80'	Stadium: Stadion Rudolf Illovszky; Attendance: 4 500; Referee: (Hungary) István Vad

01 August 2015 3	Újpest	2 – 0	Békéscsaba	Budapest, Pest County
18:00 CEST	Kálnoki-Kis 23'; Perović 43'; Nagy (yellow card) 55'	Report	Bényei (yellow card) 39'; Fehér (yellow card) 52'; Korudzhiev (yellow card) 58'; Laczkó (yellow card) 90+1'	Stadium: Szusza Ferenc Stadium; Attendance: 3 692; Referee: (Hungary) Ádám Németh

08 August 2015 4	Újpest	2 – 2	Puskás Akadémia	Budapest, Pest County
18:00 CEST	Perović 36'; Sanković (yellow card) 54'; Suljić (yellow card) 57'; Litauszki (yellow card) 68'; Bardhi 90+2'	Report	Sallai 45'; Heris 45+3' (o.g.); Hudák (yellow card) 88'	Stadium: Szusza Ferenc Stadium; Attendance: 3 060; Referee: (Hungary) Csaba Pintér

15 August 2015 5	Újpest	1 – 1	Honvéd	Budapest, Pest County
18:00 CEST	Nagy (yellow card) 46'; Tóth (yellow card) 67', (goal) 88'; Balogh (yellow card) 73'	Report	Youla (yellow card) 20', (goal) 62'; Kamber (yellow card) 45'; Prosser (yellow card) 49'; Lovrić (yellow card) 68'; Gazdag (yellow card) 90+2'; Nagy (yellow card) 90+4'	Stadium: Szusza Ferenc Stadium; Attendance: 4 157; Referee: (Hungary) István Vad

22 August 2015 6	Újpest	0 – 0	Haladás	Budapest, Pest County
18:00 CEST		Report		Stadium: Szusza Ferenc Stadium; Attendance: 3 050; Referee: (Hungary) Sándor Andó-Szabó

29 August 2015 7	Diósgyőr	2 – 1	Újpest	Miskolc, Borsod-Abaúj-Zemplén County
18:00 CEST	Nikházi (yellow card) 16'; Bacsa (yellow card) 33'; Barczi (yellow card) 65'; Bognár 90+2'; Tamás 90+4'; Takács (yellow card) 90+5'	Report	Balogh 14'; Hazard (yellow card) 54'; Nagy (yellow card) 90'	Stadium: DVTK Stadion; Attendance: 4 580; Referee: (Hungary) Tamás Bognár

12 September 2015 8	Újpest	1 – 2	Ferencváros	Budapest, Pest County
20:30 CEST	Diagne 4'; Mohl (yellow card) 39'; Kálnoki-Kis (yellow card) 67'	Report	Nalepa (yellow card) 57'; Dilaver (yellow card) 75'; Böde 78', 89'; Leandro (yellow card) 88'; Ramírez (yellow card) 90'	Stadium: Szusza Ferenc Stadium; Attendance: 8 445; Referee: (Hungary) Viktor Kassai

19 September 2015 9	Videoton	3 – 0	Újpest	Székesfehérvár, Fejér County
20:30 CEST	Gyurcsó 58', 86'; Kovács 90'	Report	Sallói (yellow card) 28'; Mohl (yellow card) 58'; Heris (yellow card) 72' (red card)	Stadium: Sóstói Stadion; Attendance: 2 549; Referee: (Hungary) Péter Solymosi

26 September 2015 10	Újpest	2 – 2	MTK Budapest	Budapest, Pest County
20:30 CEST	Diagne 14' (yellow card) 15'; Nagy (yellow card) 23'; Bardhi 48'; Sallói (yellow card) 82'; Balajcza (yellow card) 50' (yellow-red card) 87'	Report	Torghelle 63'; Kanta 88' (yellow card) 90'	Stadium: Szusza Ferenc Stadium; Attendance: 1 444; Referee: (Hungary) Zoltán Iványi

03 October 2015 11	Debrecen	1 – 1	Újpest	Debrecen, Hajdú-Bihar County
18:00 CEST	Tisza 28'; Brković (yellow card) 78'	Report	Diagne 32'; Bardhi (yellow card) 72'; Nagy (yellow card) 76'	Stadium: Nagyerdei Stadion; Attendance: 4 052; Referee: (Hungary) Ádám Farkas

17 October 2015 12	Paks	1 – 0	Újpest	Paks, Tolna County
18:00 CEST	Kulcsár (yellow card) 64'; Bertus 70'; Bajner (yellow card) 85'	Report	Nagy (yellow card) 87'; Heris (yellow card) 90+2'	Stadium: Stadion PSE; Attendance: 1 521; Referee: (Hungary) Sándor Andó-Szabó

24 October 2015 13	Újpest	2 – 0	Vasas	Budapest, Pest County
17:30 CEST	Diagne 80', 85'; Forró (yellow card) 84'	Report	Könyves (yellow card) 4'; Remili (yellow card) 53'; Debreceni (yellow card) 79'	Stadium: Szusza Ferenc Stadium; Attendance: 1 834; Referee: (Hungary) József Erdős

31 October 2015 14	Békéscsaba	1 – 3	Újpest	Békéscsaba, Békés County
18:00 CEST	Punoševac 4' (yellow card) 68'; Birtalan (yellow card) 21'; Bényei (yellow card) 39'	Report	Diagne (yellow card) 40' (goal) 79'; Nagy (yellow card) 68'; Perović 53'; Heris (yellow card) 89'; Balogh 90+1'	Stadium: Stadion Kórház utcai Attendance: 1 485; Referee: (Hungary) Tamás Bognár

01 December 2015 15	Puskás Akadémia	1 – 1	Újpest	Felcsút, Fejér County
18:00 CET	Lencse (yellow card) 25'; Nagy 67'	Report	Diagne (yellow card) 82' (goal) 90+3'	Stadium: Pancho Arena; Attendance: 1 302; Referee: (Hungary) Sándor Andó-Szabó

21 November 2015 16	Honvéd	1 – 2	Újpest	Budapest, Pest County
15:30 CET	Bobál 81'; Botka (yellow card) 82'; Baráth (yellow card) 90+3'	Report	Balázs (yellow card) 11'; Diagne 67'; Hazard 74'	Stadium: Bozsik Stadion; Attendance: 1 500; Referee: (Hungary) Ádám Farkas

28 November 2015 17	Haladás	0 – 3	Újpest	Szombathely, Vas County
15:30 CET	Gosztonyi (yellow card) 15'; Iszlai (yellow card) 27'; Wils (yellow card) 70'; Jagodics (yellow card) 87'	Report	Hazard 9'; Litauszki 30'; Kálnoki-Kis (yellow card) 45'; Diagne 60' (yellow card) 60'; Bardhi (yellow card) 81'	Stadium: Rohonci Street Stadium; Attendance: 2 817; Referee: (Hungary) Péter Solymosi

05 December 2015 18	Újpest	2 – 1	Diósgyőr	Budapest, Pest County
14:30 CET	Bardhi 33'; Diagne 88'	Report	Novothny 53' (yellow card) 82'	Stadium: Szusza Ferenc Stadium; Attendance: 2 514; Referee: (Hungary) Csaba Pintér

12 December 2015 19	Ferencváros	0 – 1	Újpest	Budapest, Pest County
19:30 CET	Nagy (yellow card) 71'; Dilaver (yellow card) 76'	Report	Heris (yellow card) 45'; Diagne 59'; Litauszki (yellow card) 76'; Bardhi (yellow card) 90'	Stadium: Groupama Arena; Attendance: 17 489; Referee: (Hungary) Viktor Kassai

13 February 2016 20	Újpest	1 – 0	Videoton	Budapest, Pest County
18:00 CET	Heris (yellow card) 56'; Hazard 69'; Litauszki (yellow card) 83'	Report	Oliveira (yellow card) 77'; Fejes (yellow card) 87'	Stadium: Szusza Ferenc Stadium; Attendance: 2 564; Referee: (Hungary) Viktor Kassai

20 February 2016 21	Újpest	1 – 1	MTK Budapest	Budapest, Pest County
17:00 CET	Andrić 8'; Nagy (yellow card) 80'	Report	Torghelle 45' (yellow card) 87'; Střeštík (yellow card) 59'; Kanta (yellow card) 70'; Vass (yellow card) 91'	Stadium: Szusza Ferenc Stadium; Attendance: 2 746; Referee: (Hungary) István Vad

27 February 2016 22	Újpest	1 – 1	Debrecen	Budapest, Pest County
15:30 CET	Windecker (yellow card) 23'; Lencse 86'	Report	Szakály 37'; Bódi (red card) 85'	Stadium: Szusza Ferenc Stadium; Attendance: 3 347; Referee: (Hungary) Ádám Farkas

05 March 2016 23	MTK Budapest	2 – 1	Újpest	Budapest, Pest County
15:30 CET	Vogyicska (yellow card) 32'; Baki (yellow card) 52'; Střeštík 58'; Hrepka 83'; Kanta (yellow card) 88'	Report	Angelov (yellow card) 35'; Mohl (yellow card) 72'; Bardhi 77'	Stadium: Hidegkuti Nándor Stadium; Attendance: 1 500; Referee: (Hungary) Viktor Kassai

09 March 2016 24	Haladás	1 – 1	Újpest	Szombathely, Vas County
18:00 CET	Williams 11'; Iszlai (yellow card) 50'	Report	Lencse 30'; Diarra (yellow card) 72'; Andrić (yellow card) 79'	Stadium: Rohonci Street Stadium; Attendance: 1 728; Referee: (Hungary) Zoltán Iványi

12 March 2016 25	Újpest	1 – 0	Diósgyőr	Budapest, Pest County
15:30 CET	Bardhi (yellow card) 25'; Diarra (yellow card) 40'; Mohl (yellow card) 90+3'; Andrić 90+3'	Report	Nemes (yellow card) 44'; Novothny (yellow card) 62'; Egerszegi (yellow card) 88'	Stadium: Szusza Ferenc Stadium; Attendance: 3 017; Referee: (Hungary) István Vad

19 March 2016 26	Békéscsaba	1 – 0	Újpest	Békéscsaba, Békés County
15:30 CET	Birtalan (yellow card) 24'; Paukner 89'	Report		Stadium: Stadion Kórház utcai Attendance: 1 431; Referee: (Hungary) József Erdős

09 April 2016 27	Újpest	2 – 2	Puskás Akadémia	Budapest, Pest County
18:00 CET	Souleymane Diarra (yellow card) 8'; Sanković (yellow card) 39'; Angelov (yellow card) 47'; Kecskés (yellow card) 55'; Balogh 58'; Kabát 90+2'	Report	Fiola 6' (yellow card) 45'; Márkvárt (yellow card) 60'; Churko 81'; Zsótér (yellow card) 90+6'	Stadium: Szusza Ferenc Stadium; Attendance: 2 014; Referee: (Hungary) József Erdős

02 April 2016 28	Vasas	3 – 2	Újpest	Budapest, Pest County
20:45 CET	Martin Ádám 13'; Grúz (yellow card) 36'; Könyves 73'; Müller (yellow card) 79'; Hangya 90'	Report	Andrić 20' (yellow card) 79'; Heris (yellow card) 58'; Bardhi 78'	Stadium: Stadion Rudolf Illovszky; Attendance: 1 200; Referee: (Hungary) Ferenc Karakó

06 April 2016 29	Újpest	2 – 0	Honvéd	Budapest, Pest County
15:45 CET	Heris (yellow card) 38'; Balogh 46'; Bardhi 64'; Litauszki (yellow card) 79'	Report	Szilágyi (yellow card) 30'; Baráth (yellow card) 72'; Kamber (yellow card) 75'	Stadium: Szusza Ferenc Stadium; Attendance: 1 131; Referee: (Hungary) Viktor Kassai

16 April 2016 30	Debrecen	1 – 0	Újpest	Debrecen, Hajdú-Bihar County
18:00 CET	Máté (yellow card) 23'; Bódi (yellow card) 44'; Tisza 82'	Report	Litauszki (yellow card) 85'	Stadium: Nagyerdei Stadion; Attendance: 3 247; Referee: (Hungary) István Vad

20 April 2016 31	Újpest	1 – 1	Paks	Budapest, Pest County
19:00 CET	Kabát (yellow card) 51'; Windecker 90+1'	Report	Hahn 18'; Kecskés (yellow card) 76'; Bartha (yellow card) 90+3'	Stadium: Szusza Ferenc Stadium; Attendance: 1 048; Referee: (Hungary) Balázs Berke

23 April 2016 32	Ferencváros	2 – 2	Újpest	Budapest, Pest County
20:30 CET	Varga 42'; Litauszki 53' (o.g.)	Report	Andrić 6'; Lencse 40'; Litauszki (yellow card) 79'; Diarra (yellow card) 90'	Stadium: Groupama Arena; Attendance: 11 267; Referee: (Hungary) Viktor Kassai

30 April 2016 33	Újpest	0 – 3	Videoton	Budapest, Pest County
16:30 CET	Kecskés (yellow card) 28'; Balajcza (red card) 30'; Cseke (yellow card) 68'; Diarra (yellow card) 71'	Report	Nego 55'; Simon (yellow card) 71'; Tischler 76'; Géresi (yellow card) 83'; Juhász 90+3'	Stadium: Szusza Ferenc Stadium; Attendance: 1 894; Referee: (Hungary) Zsolt Szabó

=== League table ===
Pos	Team	Pld	W	D	L	GF	GA	GD	Pts	Qualification or relegation
4	MTK Budapest	33	14	9	10	39	37	+2	51	Qualification for the Europa League first qualifying round (Note: Since the winners of the 2015–16 Magyar Kupa, Ferencváros, qualified for European competition based on league position, the spot awarded to the cup winners (Europa League first qualifying round) was passed to the fourth-placed team.)
5	Haladás	33	13	11	9	33	37	−4	50	
6	Újpest	33	11	13	9	42	37	+5	46	
7	Paks	33	12	7	14	41	40	+1	43	
8	Honvéd	33	12	7	14	40	39	+1	43	

Source: Soccerway
Rules for classification: 1) Points; 2) Matches won; 3) Goal difference; 4) Goals scored; 5) Head-to-head points; 6) Head-to-head goal difference; 7) Head-to-head away goals scored; 8) Fairplay; 9) Draw.

=== Results by round ===
Round	1	2	3	4	5	6	7	8	9	10	11	12	13	14	15	16	17	18	19	20	21	22	23	24	25	26	27	28	29	30	31	32	33
Ground	H	A	H	H	H	H	A	H	A	H	A	A	H	A	A	A	A	H	A	H	H	H	A	A	H	A	H	A	H	A	H	A	H
Result	D	W	W	D	D	D	L	L	L	D	D	L	W	W	D	W	W	W	W	W	D	D	L	D	W	L	W	L	W	L	D	D	L
Position	7	4	2	2	3	5	5	7	8	8	9	9	9	7	6	6	4	4	2	2	2	2	4	5	3	4	4	4	4	6	6	6	6

Updated to match(es) played on 1 May 2016. Source: Matches
A = Away; H = Home; W = Win; D = Draw; L = Loss

=== Results summary ===
Overall								Home						Away					
Pld	W	D	L	GF	GA	GD	Pts	W	D	L	GF	GA	GD	W	D	L	GF	GA	GD
33	11	13	9	42	37	+5	46	7	8	2	21	16	+5	4	5	7	21	21	0

Last updated: 1 May 2016.
Source: Matches

== Hungarian Cup ==
12 August 2015 Round 1	Vértessomló	1 – 14	Újpest	Vértessomló, Komárom-Esztergom County
17:00 CEST	Tóth (yellow card) 19' (yellow-red card) 66'; Igó 84' (pen.)	Report	Bardhi 5', 18', 20', 68'; Sallói 6', 25', 30', 55'; Balogh 14', (yellow card) 29'; Tóth 15'; Cseke 40' (pen.); Suljić 75', 86' (pen.), 90'; Litauszki (yellow card) 84'	Stadium: Vértessomló KSK Sports Ground; Referee: (Hungary) Renáta Németh

23 September 2015 Round 2	Celldömölk	0 – 9	Újpest	Celldömölk, Vas County
15:00 CEST	Enyingi (yellow card) 62'	Report	Kabát 12', 24', 42', 85'; Cseke 15'; Nagy 30', 75'; Sanković (yellow card) 42'; Balázs 81'; Bardhi 88'	Stadium: Kolozsvár utcai sporttelep Referee: (Hungary) Attila Molnár

14 October 2015 Round 3	Velence	1 – 2	Újpest	Velence, Fejér County
14:00 CEST	Király 30'	Report	Kabát 47', 49'	Stadium: Velence SE sporttelep Attendance: 400; Referee: (Hungary) Tibor II. Gyarmati

28 October 2015 Last 16 / 1st Leg	Zalaegerszeg	0 – 5	Újpest	Hévíz, Zala County
13:30 CEST		Report	Mohl 17'; Sallói 20', 37'; Perović 45', 50'	Stadium: Hévíz SK sporttelep Attendance: 700; Referee: (Hungary) Szabolcs Szilasi

18 November 2015 Last 16 / 2nd Leg	Újpest	1 – 1	Zalaegerszeg	Budapest, Pest County
18:00 CET	Balogh 66'	Report	Fodor (yellow card) 33'; Gyagya (yellow card) 65'; Szakály 80'	Stadium: Ferenc Szusza Stadium; Attendance: 500; Referee: (Hungary) Ádám Radványi

10 February 2016 Quarter-finals / 1st Leg	Újpest	8 – 1	Tiszaújváros	Budapest, Pest County
18:00 CET	Heris (yellow card) 21'; Andrić 41', 48'; Balogh 44', 57'; Katona 59' (o.g.); Bardhi 62'; Hazard 65'; Mohl 73'	Report	Katona 11'	Stadium: Ferenc Szusza Stadium; Attendance: 700; Referee: (Hungary) József Erdős

02 March 2016 Quarter-finals / 2nd Leg	Tiszaújváros	0 – 2	Újpest	Budapest, Pest County
13:30 CET	Czégel (yellow card) 29'	Report	Cseke (yellow card) 43' (goal) 60'; Kálnoki-Kis (yellow card) 53'; Kabát 80'; Diarra (yellow card) 82'	Stadium: Siketek SC Sporttelep; Attendance: 700; Referee: (Hungary) Gergő Bogár

16 March 2016 Semi-finals / 1st Leg	Újpest	2 – 0	Békéscsaba	Budapest, Pest County
16:00 CET	Kabát (yellow card) 33'; Lencse 53', 87'	Report	Ezequiel Calvente (yellow card) 58'	Stadium: Ferenc Szusza Stadium; Attendance: 825; Referee: (Hungary) Peter Solymosi

12 April 2016 Semi-finals / 2nd Leg	Békéscsaba	1 – 1	Újpest	Békéscsaba, Békés County
18:00 CET	Birtalan 35'; Laczkó (yellow card) 57'; Punoševac (yellow card) 84'	Report	Andrić 65'	Stadium: Stadion Kórház utcai Attendance: 659; Referee: (Hungary) Zsolt Szabó

07 May 2016 Final	Újpest	0 – 1	Ferencváros	Budapest, Pest County
20:30 CET	Litauszki (yellow card) 25'; Diarra (yellow card) 90+2'	Report	Gyömbér (yellow card) 57'; Gera 78'; Ramírez (yellow card) 90'	Stadium: Groupama Arena; Attendance: 19 000; Referee: (Hungary) Zoltán Iványi
