= 2016–17 Újpest FC season =

Újpest FC
2016–17 season
- Chairman: Roderick Duchâtelet
- Manager: Nebojša Vignjević
- Stadium: Ferenc Szusza Stadium
- OTP Bank Liga: 12th place
- Hungarian Cup: Pre-Season
- Lowest home attendance: 2 500 (vs Honvéd, 16 July 2016)
Home colours	Away colours

The 2016–17 season was Újpest Football Club's 111th competitive season, 105th consecutive season in the OTP Bank Liga and 131st year in existence as a football club.

== First Team Squad ==
As of 05 November 2016.

Squad No.	Name	Nationality	Position	Date of Birth (Age)
Goalkeepers
1	Szabolcs Balajcza	(Hungary)	GK	14 July 1979 (age 47)
23	Dávid Banai	(Hungary)	GK	9 May 1994 (age 32)
32	Zoltán Kovács	(Hungary)	GK	29 October 1984 (age 42)
Defenders
2	Tibor Nagy	(Hungary)	RB	14 August 1991 (age 35)
3	Jonathan Heris	(Belgium)	CB / DM	3 September 1990 (age 36)
4	Dávid Kálnoki-Kis	(Hungary)	CB / RB	6 August 1991 (age 35)
13	Dávid Mohl	(Hungary)	LB / LM	22 April 1985 (age 41)
15	Ákos Kecskés	(Hungary)	CB	4 January 1996 (age 30)
30	Péter Bauer	(Hungary)	CB	9 March 1998 (age 28)
Midfielders
5	Benjámin Cseke	(Hungary)	LM	22 July 1994 (age 32)
6	József Windecker	(Hungary)	DM	2 December 1992 (age 33)
7	Enis Bardhi	(North Macedonia)	LW / RW / CF	2 July 1995 (age 31)
8	Balázs Balogh	(Hungary)	DM / LB / LM	11 June 1990 (age 36)
14	Gábor Nagy	(Hungary)	RM / AM / CM	16 October 1985 (age 41)
18	Bojan Sanković	(Montenegro)	DM / CM	21 November 1993 (age 32)
20	Souleymane Diarra	(Mali)	CM	30 January 1995 (age 31)
21	Benjamin Balázs	(Hungary)	LW / AM / RW	26 April 1990 (age 36)
27	Bence Pávkovics	(Hungary)	CM	27 March 1997 (age 29)
Strikers
10	Kylian Hazard	(Belgium)	AM	5 August 1995 (age 31)
11	Mihailo Perović	(Montenegro)	CF	23 January 1997 (age 29)
17	Viktor Angelov	(North Macedonia)	CF	27 March 1994 (age 32)
19	Nemanja Andrić	(Serbia)	LW / RW	13 June 1987 (age 39)
24	Patrik Tóth	(Hungary)	CF	31 July 1996 (age 30)
25	Zoltán Gere	(Hungary)	CF	13 June 1997 (age 29)
28	János Lázok	(Hungary)	CF	4 October 1984 (age 42)

== New contracts ==
No.	Pos	Player	Contract length	Contract end	Date	Source
—	CB	(Hungary) Ákos Kecskés	1 year	2017	30 June 2016	
7	LW / RW / CF	(North Macedonia) Enis Bardhi	4 year	2020	1 August 2016	
20	CM	(Mali) Souleymane Diarra	4 year	2020	18 August 2016	

== Transfers ==
=== In ===
==== Summer ====
Player	Nationality	Position	Age	Moving from	Transfer fee	Date
Bence Pávkovics	Hungary	Central midfielder	19	(Hungary) Újpest FC U20	Free transfer	30 June 2016

== Statistics ==
=== Appearances and goals ===
Last updated: 4 November 2016.

No.	Pos.	Name	OTP Bank Liga		Hungarian Cup		Total		Discipline	
No.	Pos.	Name	Apps	Goals	Apps	Goals	Apps	Goals	Yellow card	Red card
1	GK	(Hungary) Szabolcs Balajcza	9	0	0	0	9	0	0	0
2	DF	(Hungary) Tibor Nagy	12	0	0	0	12	0	4	0
3	DF	(Belgium) Jonathan Heris	3	0	0	0	3	0	1	0
4	DF	(Hungary) Dávid Kálnoki-Kis	7	0	0	0	7	0	2	0
5	MF	(Hungary) Benjámin Cseke	10 (1)	2	0	0	10 (1)	2	1	0
6	MF	(Hungary) József Windecker	11 (3)	1	0	0	11 (3)	1	0	0
7	MF	(North Macedonia) Enis Bardhi	11 (2)	6	0	0	11 (2)	6	2	0
8	MF	(Hungary) Balázs Balogh	6 (1)	2	0	0	6 (1)	2	1	0
10	MF	(Belgium) Kylian Hazard	0	0	0	0	0	0	0	0
11	FW	(Montenegro) Mihailo Perović	0	0	0	0	0	0	0	0
13	DF	(Hungary) Dávid Mohl	14	0	0	0	14	0	2	0
14	MF	(Hungary) Gábor Nagy	0 (4)	0	0	0	0 (4)	0	1	0
15	DF	(Hungary) Ákos Kecskés	10	0	0	0	10	0	2	1
17	FW	(North Macedonia) Viktor Angelov	4 (4)	0	0	0	4 (4)	0	0	0
18	DF	(Montenegro) Bojan Sanković	6 (1)	0	0	0	6 (1)	0	2	0
19	MF	(Serbia) Nemanja Andrić	9 (4)	2	0	0	9 (4)	2	4	0
20	MF	(Mali) Souleymane Diarra	13 (1)	3	0	0	13 (1)	3	4	0
21	MF	(Hungary) Benjamin Balázs	8 (5)	2	0	0	8 (5)	2	2	0
23	GK	(Hungary) Dávid Banai	5	0	0	0	5	0	0	0
24	FW	(Hungary) Patrik Tóth	0 (5)	0	0	0	0 (5)	0	0	0
25	FW	(Hungary) Zoltán Gere	0	0	0	0	0	0	0	0
27	MF	(Hungary) Bence Pávkovics	8 (4)	0	0	0	8 (4)	0	2	0
28	FW	(Hungary) János Lázok	8 (6)	3	0	0	8 (6)	3	3	0
30	DF	(Hungary) Péter Bauer	0	0	0	0	0	0	0	0
32	GK	(Hungary) Zoltán Kovács	0	0	0	0	0	0	0	0

=== Top scorers ===
Includes all competitive matches. The list is sorted by shirt number when total goals are equal.

Last updated on 21 August 2016

Position	Nation	Number	Name	OTP Bank Liga	Hungarian Cup	Total
1	(North Macedonia)	7	Enis Bardhi	3	0	3
2	(Serbia)	19	Nemanja Andrić	2	0	2
3	(Hungary)	28	János Lázok	1	0	1
4	(Hungary)	21	Benjamin Balázs	1	0	1
5	(Mali)	20	Souleymane Diarra	1	0	1
			TOTALS	8	0	8

=== Overall ===
Games played	6 (6 OTP Bank Liga, 0 Hungarian Cup)
Games won	4 (4 OTP Bank Liga, 0 Hungarian Cup)
Games drawn	0 (0 OTP Bank Liga, 0 Hungarian Cup)
Games lost	2 (2 OTP Bank Liga, 0 Hungarian Cup)
Goals scored	8
Goals conceded	5
Goal difference	+3
Yellow cards	18
Red cards	0
Worst discipline	(Serbia) Nemanja Andrić (3 (yellow card) , 0 (red card) )
Best result	2–0 (A) v Mezőkövesd – OTP Bank Liga – 17-08-2016
Worst result	0–2 (H) v Honvéd – OTP Bank Liga – 16-07-2016
Most appearances	(Hungary) Tibor Nagy (6 appearances)
Most appearances	(Hungary) Benjámin Cseke (6 appearances)
Most appearances	(Hungary) József Windecker (6 appearances)
Most appearances	(Hungary) Dávid Mohl (6 appearances)
Most appearances	(Montenegro) Bojan Sanković (6 appearances)
Most appearances	(Serbia) Nemanja Andrić (6 appearances)
Most appearances	(Mali) Souleymane Diarra (6 appearances)
Most appearances	(Hungary) Benjamin Balázs (6 appearances)
Most appearances	(Hungary) Bence Pávkovics (6 appearances)
Most appearances	(Hungary) János Lázok (6 appearances)
Top scorers	(North Macedonia) Enis Bardhi (3 goals)
Points	12/18 (66.66%)

Last updated: 21 August 2016

== Friendlies ==
=== Pre-season ===
19 June 2016	Újpest	1 – 1	Hajduk Split	Grein, Upper Austria
	Angelov 19'	Report	Sušić 80'

21 June 2016	Újpest	2 – 3	St. Pölten	Grein, Upper Austria
18:00 CEST	Mohl 73'; Andrić 88'	Report	Thürauer 16'; Mader 51'; Segovia 54'

24 June 2016	Újpest	2 – 2	FC Rostov	Grein, Upper Austria
18:30 CEST	Bardhi; Andrić	Report	Doumbia; Poloz

9 July 2016	Újpest	3 – 0	Budaörsi SC	Budapest, Pest County
	Angelov; Balázs; Gere	Report		Stadium: Szusza Ferenc Stadium

== Nemzeti bajnokság I ==
=== Matches ===
16 July 2016 1	Újpest	0 – 2	Honvéd	Budapest, Pest County
18:00 CEST	Andrić (yellow card) 18'; Kecskés (yellow card) 28'; Diarra (yellow card) 58'; Sanković (yellow card) 79'	Report	Hidi 4'; Holender (yellow card) 12'; Eppel 44'; Lovrić (yellow card) 89'	Stadium: Szusza Ferenc Stadium; Attendance: 2 500; Referee: (Hungary) Zoltán Iványi

23 July 2016 2	Diósgyőr	2 – 1	Újpest	Miskolc, Borsod-Abaúj-Zemplén County
18:00 CEST	Tamás (yellow card) 11'; Oláh (yellow card) 14' (goal) 52'; Antal (yellow card) 27'; Okuka (yellow card) 28'; Elek (yellow card) 49'; Bognár 54'; Nikházi (yellow card) 56'	Report	Mohl (yellow card) 11'; Andrić 28'; Pávkovics (yellow card) 50'	Stadium: DVTK Stadion; Attendance: 6 381; Referee: (Hungary) István Vad

30 July 2016 3	Újpest	1 – 0	Paks	Budapest, Pest County
18:00 CEST	Nagy (yellow card) 8'; Lázok 11'; Balázs (yellow card) 70'	Report	Balázs (yellow card) 90'; Bartha (red card) 90+2'; Gévay (yellow card) 90+2'	Stadium: Szusza Ferenc Stadium; Attendance: 1 400; Referee: (Hungary) Csaba Pintér

6 August 2016 4	Vasas	0 – 1	Újpest	Budapest, Pest County
20:30 CEST	Berecz (yellow card) 51'	Report	Kecskés (yellow card) 30'; Cseke (yellow card) 32'; Lázok (yellow card) 65'; Bardhi (yellow card) 84' (goal) 85'; Balázs (yellow card) 90+3'	Stadium: Stadion Rudolf Illovszky; Attendance: 4 629; Referee: (Hungary) Péter Solymosi

13 August 2016 5	Újpest	3 – 1	Gyirmót	Budapest, Pest County
18:00 CEST	Kálnoki-Kis (yellow card) 57'; Andrić (yellow card) 64'; Bardhi 66', 71'; Balázs 68'; Nagy (yellow card) 75'	Report	Máté 3'; Nagy (yellow card) 67'	Stadium: Szusza Ferenc Stadium; Attendance: 2 500; Referee: (Hungary) József Erdős

17 August 2016 6	Mezőkövesd	0 – 2	Újpest	Mezőkövesd, Borsod-Abaúj-Zemplén County
19:00 CEST	Hudák (yellow card) 66'	Report	Andrić 29' (yellow card) 58'; Diarra 43'; Sanković (yellow card) 62'	Stadium: Mezőkövesdi Városi Stadion; Attendance: 2 452; Referee: (Hungary) Balázs Berke

21 August 2016 7	Újpest	0 – 0	MTK	Budapest, Pest County
18:00 CEST	Kálnoki-Kis (yellow card) 62'; Diarra (yellow card) 81'; Nagy (yellow card) 82'	Report	Borbély (yellow card) 54'; Vukmir (yellow card) 77'	Stadium: Illovszky Rudolf Stadion; Attendance: 3,300; Referee: (Hungary) Peter Solymosi

10 September 2016 8	Debreceni VSC	2 – 1	Újpest	Debrecen, Hajdú-Bihar County
18:00 CEST	Holman 9'; Sekulić (yellow card) 75'; Horváth 83'; Ferenczi (yellow card) 86'; Nagy (yellow card) 90+2'	Report	Lázok (yellow card) 44'; Andrić (yellow card) 49'; Sekulić 78' (o.g.); Nagy (yellow card) 89'	Stadium: Nagyerdei Stadion; Attendance: 4,081; Referee: (Hungary) Tamás Bognár

17 September 2016 9	Újpest	3 – 4	Videoton	Budapest, Pest County
18:30 CEST	Windecker 54'; Diarra 57' (yellow card) 72'; Bardhi 90+2'	Report	Lazović 21'; Krisztián Géresi 29'; Stopira 45'; Nego (yellow card) 51'; Paulo Vinícius (yellow card) 65'; Pátkai 70'; Filipe Oliveira (yellow card) 71'	Stadium: Illovszky Rudolf Stadion; Attendance: 3,500; Referee: (Hungary) Zoltan Ivanyi

21 September 2016 10	Újpest	1 – 1	Haladás	Budapest, Pest County
19:00 CEST	Wils 18' (o.g.)	Report	Kovács (yellow card) 57'; Wils 61'	Stadium: Illovszky Rudolf Stadion; Attendance: 2,500; Referee: (Hungary) Gergely Szots

24 September 2016 11	Ferencváros	3 – 3	Újpest	Budapest, Pest County
20:30 CEST	Djuricin 10' (yellow card) 66'; Pintér (yellow card) 45+2'; Nagy (yellow card) 53'; Leandro 60' (yellow card) 85'; Bence Pávkovics 65' (o.g.)	Report	Diarra 20' (yellow card) 69'; Balogh 38' 53' (pen.); Nagy (yellow card) 45'; Bence Pávkovics (yellow card) 74'	Stadium: Groupama Arena; Attendance: 11,760; Referee: (Hungary) Viktor Kassai

15 October 2016 12	Honvéd	1 – 1	Újpest	Budapest, Pest County
18:00 CEST	Lanzafame 69'	Report	Lázok 52'; Bardhi (yellow card) 68'; Balogh (yellow card) 89'	Stadium: Bozsik József Stadion; Attendance: 2,713; Referee: (Hungary) Sandor Ando-Szabo

22 October 2016 13	Újpest	4 – 4	Diósgyőr	Budapest, Pest County
18:00 CEST	Lázok 21' (yellow card) 57'; Cseke 37' 88'; Mohl (yellow card) 69'; Bardhi 85'	Report	Diego Vela 3' (yellow card) 58'; Nono (yellow card) 34'; Bognár 52' (pen.); Lipták 74'; Lázár (yellow card) 81'; Jagodinskis 90+2'	Stadium: Illovszky Rudolf Stadion; Attendance: 2,000; Referee: (Hungary) Csaba Pinter

29 October 2016 14	Paks	1 – 1	Újpest	Paks, Tolna County
18:00 CEST	Gévay (yellow card) 40'; Kulcsár (yellow card) 58'; Báló (yellow card) 67'; Szakály 88'; Vernes (yellow card) 90+1'	Report	Balázs 9'; Heris (yellow card) 40'; Kecskés (yellow card) 75' (yellow-red card)	Stadium: Fehérvári úti Stadion; Attendance: 1,234; Referee: (Hungary) Tamás Bognár

5 November 2016 15	Újpest	2 – 2	Vasas FC	Kecskemét, Bács-Kiskun County
18:00 CEST	Windecker 34'; Bardhi 61'	Report	Ristevski (yellow card) 32'; Sağlık 49' (yellow card) 87'; Korcsmár 76'; Vida (yellow card) 90+1'	Stadium: Széktói Stadion; Attendance: 1,442; Referee: (Hungary) Peter Solymosi

19 November 2016 16	Gyirmót	1 – 2	Újpest	Győr, Győr-Moson-Sopron County
15:30 CEST	Filkor (yellow card) 13'; Bojović 78'	Report	Diarra (yellow card) 13'; Windecker (yellow card) 67' (goal) 90+3'; Nagy (yellow card) 80'; Lázok 84'	Stadium: Alcufer Stadion; Attendance: 1,324; Referee: (Hungary) Gergely Szots

26 November 2016 17	Újpest	1 – 1	Mezőkövesd-Zsóry SE	Kecskemét, Bács-Kiskun County
15:30 CEST	Windecker (yellow card) 42'; Andrić 52' (pen.); Bardhi (yellow card) 58'	Report	Hudák (yellow card) 55'; Pauljević 55' (yellow card) 62'; Tujvel (yellow card) 90+2'	Stadium: Széktói Stadion; Attendance: 700; Referee: (Hungary) Sandor Ando-Szabo

3 December 2016 18	MTK Budapest	1 – 1	Újpest	Budapest, Pest County
15:30 CEST	Poór 47'; Vukmir (yellow card) 78'	Report	Bardhi 16'; Heris (yellow card) 66'; Diarra (yellow card) 73'	Stadium: Hidegkuti Nándor Stadion; Attendance: 2,584; Referee: (Hungary) Tamás Bognár

10 December 2016 19	Újpest	2 – 0	Debreceni VSC	Kecskemét, Bács-Kiskun County
15:30 CEST	Diarra (yellow card) 44'; Bence Pávkovics (yellow card) 46'; Andrić 48'; Balázs (yellow card) 56'; Bardhi 78'	Report	Sekulić (yellow card) 68'; Takács (yellow card) 78'; Tőzsér (yellow card) 84'	Stadium: Széktói Stadion; Attendance: 300; Referee: (Hungary) Zoltan Ivanyi

18 February 2017 20	Videoton	5 – 1	Újpest	Felcsút, Fejér County
15:30 CEST	Hadžić 32'; Šćepović 58' 83'; Suljić 64'; Stopira 84'	Report	Perović 7'; Kálnoki-Kis (yellow card) 17'; Diarra (yellow card) 65' (yellow-red card)	Stadium: Pancho Arena; Attendance: 2,179; Referee: (Hungary) Peter Solymosi

25 February 2017 21	Haladás	0 – 2	Újpest	Sopron, Sopron County
15:30 CEST		Report	Perović 13'; Kristóf Szűcs (yellow card) 78' (goal) 90+3'	Stadium: Káposztás utcai Stadion; Attendance: 1,834; Referee: (Hungary) Sandor Ando-Szabo

4 March 2017 22	Újpest	0 – 1	Ferencváros	Budapest, Pest County
18:00 CEST	Balázs (yellow card) 34'; Cseke (yellow card) 52'; Bence Pávkovics (yellow card) 67'	Report	Gera 36'; Djuricin (yellow card) 84'; Radó (yellow card) 88'	Stadium: Szusza Ferenc Stadium; Attendance: 8,005; Referee: (Hungary) Adam Farkas

11 March 2017 23	Újpest	1 – 1	Honvéd	Budapest, Pest County
18:00 CEST	Heris (yellow card) 17'; Kecskés (yellow card) 56'; Angelov 90+1'	Report	Zsótér (yellow card) 24' (goal) 28'; Holender (yellow card) 30'; Lanzafame (yellow card) 72'; Ikenne (yellow card) 90'	Stadium: Szusza Ferenc Stadium; Attendance: 3,130; Referee: (Hungary) Viktor Kassai

1 April 2017 24	Diósgyőr	3 – 1	Újpest	Mezőkövesd, Borsod-Abaúj-Zemplén County
18:00 CEST	Makrai 19'; Ugrai 32'; Lipták (yellow card) 54'; Karan 69' (yellow card) 72'	Report	Balogh (yellow card) 14'; Diarra (yellow card) 41'; Lázok 52'; Bardhi (yellow card) 66'; Sanković (yellow card) 89'	Stadium: Mezőkövesdi Városi Stadion; Attendance: 2,295; Referee: (Hungary) Adam Farkas

8 April 2017 25	Újpest	1 – 1	Paks	Budapest, Pest County
18:00 CEST	Kovács (yellow card) 31'; Diarra (yellow card) 49'; Heris 65'; Perović (yellow card) 90+3'	Report	Bartha 23' (pen.); Lenzsér (yellow card) 59'; Vernes (yellow card) 83'	Stadium: Szusza Ferenc Stadium; Attendance: 1,568; Referee: (Hungary) Ferenc Karakó

11 April 2017 26	Vasas FC	2 – 3	Újpest	Budapest, Pest County
18:00 CEST	Debrecceni (yellow card) 32'; Gaál 54'; Király 88'; Ferenczi (yellow card) 90+1'	Report	Heris 4'; Kecskés (yellow card) 38'; Balogh 45+1'; Mohl 60'	Stadium: Bozsik Stadion; Attendance: 1,100; Referee: (Hungary) Sandor Ando-Szabo

15 April 2017 27	Újpest	2 – 2	Gyirmót	Budapest, Pest County
18:00 CEST	Diarra 26' (yellow card) 76'; Bardhi 56'	Report	Bojović (yellow card) 17' (goal) 35'; Novák 54' (yellow card) 88'; Kolčák (yellow card) 59'; Simon (yellow card) 77'; Nad (yellow card) 84'	Stadium: Szusza Ferenc Stadium; Attendance: 1,673; Referee: (Hungary) Csaba Pinter

22 April 2017 28	Mezőkövesd Zsóry FC	1 – 3	Újpest	Mezőkövesd, Borsod-Abaúj-Zemplén County
18:00 CEST	Pauljević (yellow card) 3' (yellow-red card); Bačelić-Grgić 90+2'	Summary	Andrić 32' (yellow card) 64'; Bardhi 34'; Balázs (yellow card) 39' (goal) 72'; Kristóf Szűcs (yellow card) 68'	Stadium: Mezőkövesdi Városi Stadion; Attendance: 1,507; Referee: (Hungary) Viktor Kassai

29 April 2017 29	Újpest	1 – 2	MTK Budapest	Budapest, Pest County
18:00 CEST	Sanković (yellow card) 2'; Cseke (yellow card) 44'; Lázok (yellow card) 45'; Bardhi 83' (pen.)	Summary	Baki (yellow card) 30'; Katona (yellow card) 38'; Torghelle 45' (pen.); Grgić (yellow card) 64'; Hrepka 90' (yellow card) 90+5'	Stadium: Szusza Ferenc Stadium; Attendance: 1,962; Referee: (Hungary) István Vad

6 May 2017 30	Debreceni VSC	1 – 0	Újpest	Debrecen, Hajdú-Bihar County
18:00 CEST	Brković (yellow card) 47'; Filip (red card) 67'; Heris 78' (o.g.)	Summary	Diarra (yellow card) 90+4'	Stadium: Nagyerdei Stadion; Attendance: 5,112; Referee: (Hungary) Zoltan Ivanyi

13 May 2017 31	Újpest	0 – 3	Videoton	Budapest, Pest County
20:30 CEST	Diarra (red card) 28'; Kálnoki-Kis (yellow card) 31'; Windecker (yellow card) 59'	Summary	Nego 14'; Stopira 16'; Šćepović 41'; Varga (yellow card) 77'	Stadium: Szusza Ferenc Stadium; Attendance: 2,160; Referee: (Hungary) Ferenc Karakó

20 May 2017 32	Újpest	2 – 1	Haladás	Budapest, Pest County
18:00 CEST	Balogh 21'; Kristóf Szűcs (yellow card) 70'; Bardhi 86'	Summary	Wils (yellow card) 61'; Williams 71' (pen.)	Stadium: Szusza Ferenc Stadium; Attendance: 2,050; Referee: (Hungary) Jozsef Erdos

27 May 2017 33	Ferencváros	v	Újpest	Budapest, Pest County
19:00 CEST				Stadium: Groupama Arena

=== Magyar Kupa ===
14 September 2016 6 Round	BTE Felsőzsolca	0 – 4	Újpest	Felsőzsolca, Borsod-Abaúj-Zemplén County
		Report		Stadium: Felsőzsolcai Sportpálya

26 October 2016 Last 64	Mád FC	0 – 4	Újpest	Mád, Borsod-Abaúj-Zemplén County
13:30		Report		Stadium: Mád FC Sporttelep

30 November 2016 Last 32	Kozármisleny	1 – 1 (a.e.t.) (2 – 4 p)	Újpest	Pécs, Baranya County
17:00		Report		Stadium: Stadion PMFC

11 February 2017 Last 16 First Leg	Zalaegerszegi TE	1 – 4	Újpest	Zalaegerszeg, Zala County
14:00	Nagy (yellow card) 65'; Bobál 88'	Report	Mohl 10'; Bardhi 18'; Balogh 69'; Diarra 71'	Stadium: ZTE Arena; Attendance: 3,150; Referee: (Hungary) Tamás Bognár

1 March 2017 Last 16 Second Leg	Újpest	2 – 0 (6 – 1 agg.)	Zalaegerszegi TE	Budapest
18:00	Nagy 49'; Diarra 59'	Report		Stadium: Szusza Ferenc stadion Attendance: 1,009; Referee: (Hungary) Gergő Bogár

29 March 2017 Quarter Final First Leg	Újpest	1 – 2	Vasas	Budapest
20:00	Lázok 5'; Mohl (yellow card) 7'; Diarra (yellow card) 38'; Heris (yellow card) 74'; Kálnoki-Kis (red card) 90'	Report	James (yellow card) 38' (goal) 62'; Vaskó (yellow card) 42'; Remili 86'	Stadium: Szusza Ferenc stadion Referee: (Hungary) István Vad

5 April 2017 Quarter Final Second Leg	Vasas	0 – 1 (2 – 2 agg.)	Újpest	Budapest
20:30	Gaál (yellow card) 49'; James (yellow card) 66'	Report	Andrić 47'; Heris (yellow card) 81'	Stadium: Hidegkuti Nándor Stadion; Attendance: 1,300; Referee: (Hungary) Gergely Szots

=== League table ===
Pos	Team	Pld	W	D	L	GF	GA	GD	Pts
5	Paks	33	11	12	10	41	37	+4	45
6	Haladás	33	12	7	14	42	46	−4	43
7	Újpest	33	10	12	11	47	51	−4	42
8	Debrecen	33	11	8	14	42	46	−4	41
9	Mezőkövesd	33	10	10	13	39	54	−15	40

Source: Hungarian Football Federation (in Hungarian), Soccerway
Rules for classification: 1) Points; 2) Matches won; 3) Goal difference; 4) Goals scored; 5) Head-to-head points; 6) Head-to-head goal difference; 7) Head-to-head away goals scored; 8) Fairplay; 9) Draw.

=== Results by round ===
Round	1	2	3	4	5	6	7	8	9	10	11	12	13	14	15	16	17	18	19	20	21	22	23	24	25	26	27	28	29	30	31	32	33
Ground	H	A	H	A	H	A	H	A	H	H	A	A	H	A	H	A	H	A	H	A	A	H	H	A	H	A	H	A	H	A	H	H	A
Result	L	L	W	W	W	W	D	L	L	D	D	D	D	D	D	W	D	D	W	L	W	L	D	L	D	W	D	W	L	L	L	W	
Position	12	12	7	5	4	3	4	5	7	7	7	7	7	7	7	7	7	7	7	8	8	8	8	8	7	6	6	6	6	7	7	7	

Updated to match(es) played on 20 May 2017. Source: Matches
A = Away; H = Home; W = Win; D = Draw; L = Loss

=== Results summary ===
Overall								Home						Away					
Pld	W	D	L	GF	GA	GD	Pts	W	D	L	GF	GA	GD	W	D	L	GF	GA	GD
32	10	12	10	47	49	−2	42	4	8	5	24	26	−2	6	4	5	23	23	0

Last updated: 20 May 2017.
Source: Matches
