= Ákos Kecskés =

Hungarian footballer

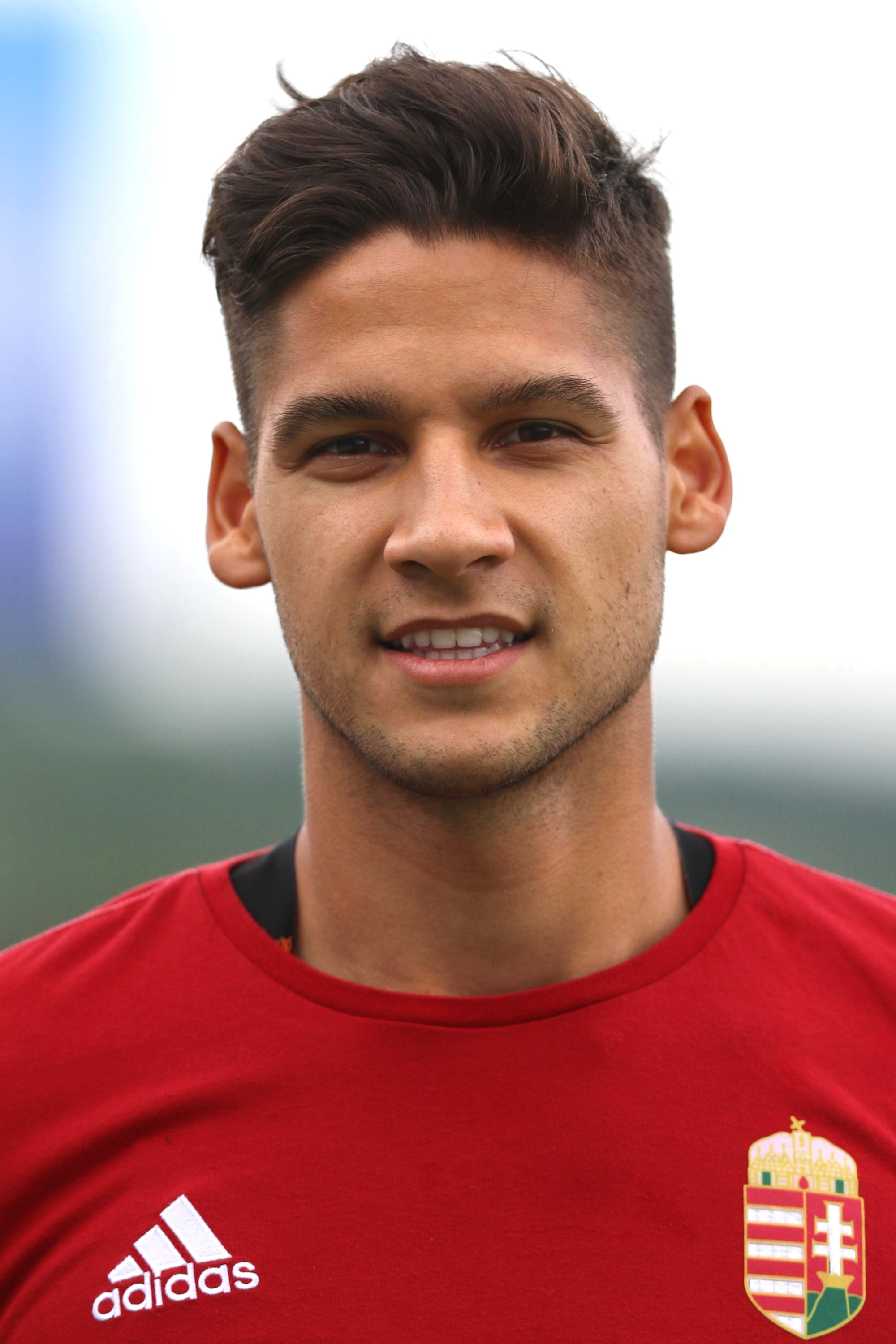
- Kecskés in 2017

Personal information
- Full name: Ákos Kecskés
- Date of birth: 4 January 1996 (age 30)
- Place of birth: Hódmezővásárhely, Hungary
- Height: 1.90 m (6 ft 3 in)
- Position: Centre-back

Team information
- Current team: Diósgyőri VTK
- Number: 5

Youth career
- 2003–2004: Makó
- 2004–2012: Tisza Volán
- 2012–2015: Atalanta

Senior career*
Years	Team	Apps	(Gls)
2015–2018	Atalanta	0	(0)
2015–2017	→ Újpest (loan)	31	(0)
2017	→ Termalica Nieciecza (loan)	12	(0)
2018	→ Korona Kielce (loan)	4	(0)
2018–2021	Lugano	62	(2)
2021–2022	Nizhny Novgorod	20	(1)
2022–2023	LASK	6	(0)
2023–2024	Sepsi OSK	29	(0)
2024–2025	AEL Limassol	11	(0)
2025–	Diósgyőr	12	(0)

International career
2011	Hungary U16	1	(0)
2012–2013	Hungary U17	4	(0)
2014	Hungary U18	5	(0)
2014	Hungary U19	2	(0)
2015–2017	Hungary U20	7	(0)
2015–2018	Hungary U21	15	(0)
2020–2022	Hungary	6	(0)
- * Club domestic league appearances and goals as of 19 January 2026

Ákos Kecskés (born 4 January 1996) is a Hungarian professional footballer who plays for as a centre-back in Hungarian club Diósgyőri VTK.

== Club career ==
On 29 July 2021, he signed a two-year contract with Russian Premier League club Nizhny Novgorod.

On 4 August 2022, Kecskés joined LASK in Austria on a contract until 2026.

On 2 September 2023, he was signed by Liga I club Sepsi OSK.

On 7 September 2024, he signed for Limassol on a free transfer.

On 8 July 2025, he was signed by Hungarian club Diósgyőri VTK.

== International career ==
On 1 June 2021, Kecskés was included in the final 26-man squad to represent Hungary at the rescheduled UEFA Euro 2020 tournament.

== Career statistics ==
As of match played 2 January 2025

Appearances and goals by club, season and competition
Club	Season	League			National cup (Note: Includes Magyar Kupa, Polish Cup, Swiss Cup, Russian Cup, Cupa României, Cypriot Cup)		Continental		Total	
Club	Season	Division	Apps	Goals	Apps	Goals	Apps	Goals	Apps	Goals
Újpest	2015–16	NB I	9	0	5	0	—		14	0
Újpest	2016–17	NB I	22	0	4	0	—		26	0
Újpest	Total		31	0	9	0	—		40	0
Bruk-Bet Termalica (loan)	2017–18	Ekstraklasa	12	0	1	0	—		13	0
Korona Kielce (loan)	2017–18	Ekstraklasa	4	0	1	0	—		5	0
Lugano	2018–19	Swiss Super League	7	0	1	0	—		8	0
Lugano	2019–20	Swiss Super League	26	2	1	0	2 (Note: Appearances in UEFA Europa League)	0	29	2
Lugano	2020–21	Swiss Super League	29	0	2	0	—		31	0
Lugano	Total		62	2	4	0	2	0	68	2
Nizhny Novgorod	2021–22	RPL	19	1	1	0	—		20	1
Nizhny Novgorod	2022–23	RPL	1	0	—		—		1	0
Nizhny Novgorod	Total		20	1	1	0	0	0	21	1
LASK	2022–23	Austrian Bundesliga	6	0	2	0	—		8	0
Sepsi OSK	2023–24	Liga I	26	0	1	0	—		27	0
Sepsi OSK	2024–25	Liga I	3	0	0	0	—		3	0
Sepsi OSK	Total		29	0	1	0	0	0	30	0
AEL Limassol	2024–25	Cypriot First Division	4	0	1	0	—		5	0
Diósgyőri VTK	2025–26	Nemzeti Bajnokság I	12	0	1	0	—		13	0
Career total			158	3	17	0	2	0	177	3

=== International ===
As of 29 March 2022

Appearances and goals by national team and year
National team	Year	Apps	Goals
Hungary	2020	1	0
Hungary	2021	3	0
Hungary	2022	2	0
Total		6	0

== Honours ==
Újpest

- Magyar Kupa runner-up: 2015–16
