= Enis Bardhi =

Macedonian footballer (born 1995)

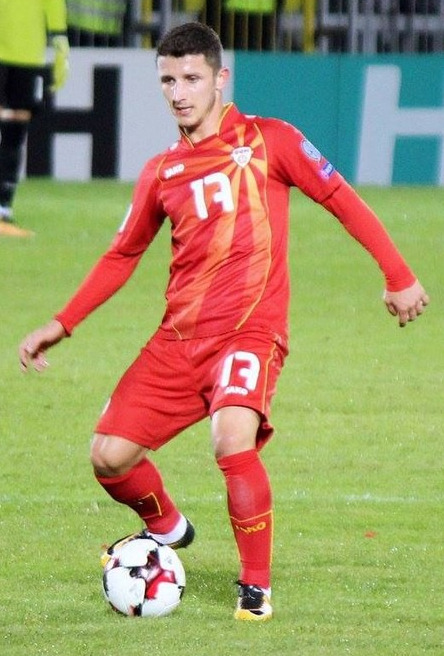
- Bardhi with Macedonia in 2017

Personal information
- Full name: Enis Bardhi
- Date of birth: 2 July 1995 (age 31)
- Place of birth: Blace, Macedonia
- Height: 1.72 m (5 ft 8 in)
- Position: Attacking midfielder

Team information
- Current team: Konyaspor
- Number: 10

Youth career
- –2013: Shkupi
- 2013–2014: Brøndby

Senior career*
Years	Team	Apps	(Gls)
2014	Prespa Birlik	10	(5)
2014–2017	Újpest	79	(20)
2017–2022	Levante	148	(23)
2022–2025	Trabzonspor	73	(13)
2025	Bodrum	15	(1)
2025–	Konyaspor	40	(5)

International career^{‡}
2012–2013	Macedonia U17	1	(0)
2013–2014	Macedonia U19	4	(0)
2014–2017	Macedonia U21	14	(4)
2015–	North Macedonia	88	(20)
- * Club domestic league appearances and goals as of 30 October 2026 ‡ National team caps and goals as of 16 November 2026

Enis Bardhi (born 2 July 1995) is a Macedonian professional footballer who plays as an attacking midfielder for Turkish Süper Lig club Konyaspor and North Macedonia national team.

== Club career ==
=== Early career ===
Born in Skopje, Macedonia (now North Macedonia), to Albanian parents, Bardhi started his early career at KF Skupi. He later joined the Brøndby IF's youth system in 2013. In November of that year, however, he agreed to a one-year professional deal with Swedish Football Division 2 club KSF Prespa Birlik. He featured in ten matches and scored five goals for the club during his spell, helping in their narrow escape from relegation.

=== Újpest ===
In August 2014, Bardhi moved to Hungarian Nemzeti Bajnokság I club Újpest on trial, and signed a three-year contract late in the month.

=== Levante ===
On 17 July 2017, Bardhi agreed to a three-year deal with La Liga side Levante UD for an estimated €1.5 million. He made his La Liga debut on August 21, starting in a 1–0 home win against Villarreal CF.

On 26 August, he scored his debut goal in the top tier, a direct free kick in a 2–2 home draw against Deportivo de La Coruña.

=== Trabzonspor ===
On 12 August 2022, following Levante's relegation from La Liga, Bardhi moved to Turkish Süper Lig club Trabzonspor. On 15 January 2025 his contract with the club was mutually terminated.

=== Bodrum ===
On 24 January 2025, Turkish Süper Lig club Bodrum announced the signing of Bardhi until the end of the season. He debuted with his new team on January 26, subbing in for Jonathan Okita at minute 83 of the game played against Eyüpspor. On 16 March, he netted his first goal in a 2–0 away win over Çaykur Rizespor. A month later, on 2 April, he scored a goal in a 3–2 away defeat after extra time against his former club Trabzonspor in the Turkish Cup quarter-finals.

=== Konyaspor ===
On July 12, 2025, Bardhi signed a two-year contract with Süper Lig club Konyaspor. On 5 May 2026, he netted a stoppage-time penalty in a 1–0 away win over Beşiktaş, sealing his club's place in the Turkish Cup final.

== International career ==
Bardhi was born in Macedonia to a Kosovar Albanian family and was thus eligible to represent Macedonia, Albania or Kosovo. Bardhi desired to represent Albania, stating "I do not believe there is an Albanian born in Skopje, with Albanian families, who would not want to play for Albania". Redi Jupi, who was appointed as scouting manager for the Albanian Football Association, never approached Bardhi or responded to Bardhi's agents. With Football Federation of Macedonia showing genuine interest and Bardhi viewing the Albanian Football Association's handling of the situation and response as unprofessional, he accepted the call-up for Macedonia.

However, Jetmir Salihu, a representative for the Albanian Football Association, dismissed Bardhi's claim, unveiling all the text messages between him and the player, showing that Bardhi was never interested in playing for Albania in the first place. He also accused the player of trying to damage the image of the association with the aim to be seen as a hero to Albanian people, stating: "Since 2010 I've had hundreds of such cases, footballers that have refused the national team and at the end they came out with such statements because they want to make FSHF guilty so they can win the sympathy of Albanians."

Bardhi represented Macedonia at under-17, under-19 and under-21 levels before making his senior international debut on 27 March 2015, coming on as a first-half substitute for Artim Položani in a 2–1 UEFA Euro 2016 qualifying home loss against Belarus.

Bardhi was part of North Macedonia's UEFA Euro 2020 squad, starting in all three of their group stage games. In September 2023, he became the captain of the North Macedonia national football team.

== Career statistics ==
=== Club ===
As of match played 13 October 2024

Appearances and goals by club, season and competition
Club	Season	League			National cup (Note: Includes Magyar Kupa, Copa del Rey, Turkish Cup)		League cup (Note: Includes Ligakupa)		Europe		Total	
Club	Season	Division	Apps	Goals	Apps	Goals	Apps	Goals	Apps	Goals	Apps	Goals
Prespa Birlik	2014	Swedish Division 2	10	5	—		—		—		10	5
Újpest	2014–15	NB I	21	2	6	0	3	0	—		30	2
Újpest	2015–16	NB I	29	6	5	1	—		—		34	7
Újpest	2016–17	NB I	29	12	4	1	—		—		33	13
Újpest	Total		79	20	15	2	3	0	—		97	22
Levante	2017–18	La Liga	26	9	4	0	—		—		30	9
Levante	2018–19	La Liga	36	3	2	0	—		—		38	3
Levante	2019–20	La Liga	30	7	2	0	—		—		32	7
Levante	2020–21	La Liga	26	1	4	1	—		—		30	2
Levante	2021–22	La Liga	30	3	2	0	—		—		32	3
Levante	Total		148	23	14	1	—		—		162	24
Trabzonspor	2022–23	Süper Lig	30	6	3	0	—		9 (Note: Two appearances in UEFA Champions League, six appearances and one goal in UEFA Europa League, one appearance in UEFA Europa Conference League)	1	42	7
Trabzonspor	2023–24	Süper Lig	35	6	7	0	—		—		42	6
Trabzonspor	2024–25	Süper Lig	6	0	0	0	—		5 (Note: Three appearances in UEFA Europa League, two appearance in UEFA Europa Conference League)	0	11	0
Trabzonspor	Total		71	12	10	0	—		14	1	95	13
Career total			308	60	39	3	3	0	14	1	364	64

=== International ===
As of match played 16 November 2026

Appearances and goals by national team and year
National team	Year	Apps	Goals
North Macedonia	2015	4	0
North Macedonia	2016	2	0
North Macedonia	2017	5	1
North Macedonia	2018	8	2
North Macedonia	2019	8	2
North Macedonia	2020	4	0
North Macedonia	2021	11	4
North Macedonia	2022	10	4
North Macedonia	2023	10	3
North Macedonia	2024	8	2
North Macedonia	2025	10	2
North Macedonia	2026	8	0
Total		88	20

Scores and results list North Macedonia's goal tally first, score column indicates score after each Bardhi goal.

List of international goals scored by Enis Bardhi
No.	Date	Venue	Opponent	Score	Result	Competition
1	9 October 2017	Stadion Mladost, Strumica, Macedonia	Liechtenstein	3–0	4–0	2018 FIFA World Cup qualification
2	16 November 2018	Rheinpark Stadion, Vaduz, Liechtenstein	Liechtenstein	1–0	2–0	2018–19 UEFA Nations League D
3	19 November 2018	Philip II Arena, Skopje, Macedonia	Gibraltar	1–0	4–0	2018–19 UEFA Nations League D
4	25 March 2019	Stožice Stadium, Ljubljana, Slovenia	Slovenia	1–1	1–1	UEFA Euro 2020 qualifying
5	9 September 2019	Daugava Stadium, Riga, Latvia	Latvia	2–0	2–0	UEFA Euro 2020 qualifying
6	28 March 2021	Toše Proeski Arena, Skopje, North Macedonia	Liechtenstein	1–0	5–0	2022 FIFA World Cup qualification
7	11 November 2021	Vazgen Sargsyan Republican Stadium, Yerevan, Armenia	Armenia	2–0	5–0	2022 FIFA World Cup qualification
8	11 November 2021	Vazgen Sargsyan Republican Stadium, Yerevan, Armenia	Armenia	3–0	5–0	2022 FIFA World Cup qualification
9	11 November 2021	Vazgen Sargsyan Republican Stadium, Yerevan, Armenia	Armenia	5–0	5–0	2022 FIFA World Cup qualification
10	5 June 2022	Victoria Stadium, Gibraltar	Gibraltar	1–0	2–0	2022–23 UEFA Nations League C
11	12 June 2022	Toše Proeski Arena, Skopje, North Macedonia	Gibraltar	1–0	4–0	2022–23 UEFA Nations League C
12	17 November 2022	Toše Proeski Arena, Skopje, North Macedonia	Finland	1–1	1–1	Friendly
13	20 November 2022	Toše Proeski Arena, Skopje, North Macedonia	Azerbaijan	1–0	1–3	Friendly
14	16 June 2023	Toše Proeski Arena, Skopje, North Macedonia	Ukraine	1–0	2–3	UEFA Euro 2024 qualifying
15	9 September 2023	Toše Proeski Arena, Skopje, North Macedonia	Italy	1–1	1–1	UEFA Euro 2024 qualifying
16	20 November 2023	Toše Proeski Arena, Skopje, North Macedonia	England	1–0	1–1	UEFA Euro 2024 qualifying
17	7 September 2024	Tórsvøllur, Tórshavn, Faroe Islands	Faroe Islands	1–1	1–1	2024–25 UEFA Nations League C
18	10 September 2024	Toše Proeski Arena, Skopje, North Macedonia	Armenia	1–0	2–0	2024–25 UEFA Nations League C
19	7 September 2025	Toše Proeski Arena, Skopje, North Macedonia	Liechtenstein	2–0	5–0	2026 FIFA World Cup qualification
20	13 October 2025	Toše Proeski Arena, Skopje, North Macedonia	Kazakhstan	1–1	1–1	2026 FIFA World Cup qualification

== Honours ==
Újpest

- Szuperkupa: 2014

Individual

- Macedonian Footballer of the Year: 2017
