= Mihailo Perović =

Montenegrin footballer

Personal information
- Date of birth: 23 January 1997 (age 29)
- Place of birth: Podgorica, FR Yugoslavia
- Height: 1.80 m (5 ft 11 in)
- Position: Forward

Team information
- Current team: Bengaluru
- Number: 9

Youth career
- 2012–2015: Budućnost Podgorica

Senior career*
Years	Team	Apps	(Gls)
2015–2017	Újpest	29	(8)
2017–2018	Voždovac	6	(1)
2018–2019	Budućnost Podgorica	46	(11)
2020	Zorya Luhansk	20	(1)
2021–2022	Olimpija Ljubljana	14	(2)
2022	→ Iskra Danilovgrad (loan)	15	(2)
2022–2024	Iskra Danilovgrad	13	(3)
2024–2025	Jezero	35	(16)
2025–2026	Persebaya Surabaya	28	(6)
2026–	Bengaluru	2	(1)

International career
2013	Montenegro U17	1	(0)
2015	Montenegro U19	6	(3)
2016–2017	Montenegro	7	(1)
- * Club domestic league appearances and goals as of 17 October 2026

Mihailo Perović (Cyrillic: Михаило Перовић; born 23 January 1997) is a Montenegrin professional footballer who plays as a forward for Indian Super League club Bengaluru.

== Club career ==
=== Újpest ===
At the age of 18, he signed his first professional contract with Hungarian team Újpest in February 2015. He made his NB I debut with Újpest under coach Nebojša Vignjević on 21 March 2015 in a game against Honvéd. In 2016 he suffered an ACL injury which kept him from playing for six months.

=== Voždovac ===
Perović signed with Serbian team Voždovac in July 2017. He saw little playing time at Voždovac and scored his only goal in a 2–1 win against Borac Čačak on 5 August 2017.

=== Budućnost Podgorica ===
Perović signed with his childhood team Budućnost Podgorica in July 2018. On 30 May 2019, he scored a hat-trick against Lovćen in the 2019 Montenegrin Cup Final, which Budućnost won 4–0. On 25 July 2019, he scored a goal in a 3–1 loss against Ukrainian club Zorya Luhansk in the second qualifying round of the 2019–20 UEFA Europa League.

=== Zorya Luhansk ===
On 23 January 2020, Perović signed a two-and-a-half-year contract with Ukrainian club Zorya Luhansk.

=== Olimpija Ljubljana ===
On 26 January 2021, Perović joined Slovenian team Olimpija Ljubljana, signing a contract until summer 2023.

== Career statistics ==
=== Club ===
As of match played 21 April 2025

Club	Season	League			National Cup (Note: Includes Magyar Kupa, Montenegro Cup, Serbian Cup, Ukrainian Cup, Slovenian Football Cup)		Continental		Total	
Club	Season	Division	Apps	Goals	Apps	Goals	Apps	Goals	Apps	Goals
Újpest	2014–15	Nemzeti Bajnokság I	9	3	3	0	—		12	3
Újpest	2015–16	Nemzeti Bajnokság I	8	3	3	2	—		11	5
Újpest	2016–17	Nemzeti Bajnokság I	12	2	4	4	—		16	6
Újpest	Total		29	8	10	6	—		39	14
Voždovac	2017–18	Serbian SuperLiga	6	1	1	1	—		7	2
Buducnost Podgorica	2018–19	Montenegrin First League	32	7	5	3	2 (Note: Appearances in UEFA Europa League)	1	39	11
Buducnost Podgorica	2019–20	Montenegrin First League	14	4	4	1	4	2	22	7
Buducnost Podgorica	Total		46	11	9	4	6	3	61	18
Zorya Luhansk	2019–20	Ukrainian Premier League	11	1	—		—		11	1
Zorya Luhansk	2020–21	Ukrainian Premier League	9	0	1	0	5	0	15	0
Zorya Luhansk	Total		20	1	1	0	5	0	26	1
Olimpija Ljubljana	2020–21	Slovenian PrvaLiga	14	2	2	0	—		16	2
Iskra Danilovgrad (loan)	2021–22	Montenegrin First League	15	2	2	1	—		17	3
Iskra Danilovgrad	2022–23	Montenegrin First League	6	2	2	0	—		8	2
Iskra Danilovgrad	2023–24	Montenegrin Second League	7	1	—		—		7	1
Iskra Danilovgrad	Total		13	3	2	0	—		15	3
Jezero	2024–25	Montenegrin First League	35	16	—		—		35	16
Persebaya Surabaya	2025–26	Indonesian Super League	28	6	—		—		28	6
Bengaluru	2026–27	Indian Super League	0	0	—		—		0	0
Career total			206	50	27	12	11	3	244	65

== Honours ==
Budućnost Podgorica

- Montenegrin Cup: 2019

Olimpija Ljubljana

- Slovenian Cup: 2020–21
