= Tibor Nagy (footballer, born 1991) =

Hungarian footballer (born 1991)

Personal information
- Date of birth: 14 August 1991 (age 35)
- Place of birth: Nyíregyháza, Hungary
- Height: 1.83 m (6 ft 0 in)
- Position: Right back

Team information
- Current team: Monor
- Number: 2

Youth career
- 2006–2007: Debrecen
- 2007–2010: MTK

Senior career*
| Years | Team | Apps | (Gls) |
| 2010–2016 | MTK | 40 | (0) |
| 2011–2012 | → Szigetszentmiklós (loan) | 21 | (1) |
| 2015–2016 | → Újpest (loan) | 9 | (0) |
| 2016–2017 | Újpest | 15 | (0) |
| 2017–2018 | Diósgyőr | 20 | (0) |
| 2019–2020 | Bicske | 16 | (1) |
| 2020–2021 | III. Kerület | 26 | (0) |
| 2021– | Monor | 15 | (0) |

International career
| 2009–2010 | Hungary U-19 | 6 | (0) |
- * Club domestic league appearances and goals as of 7 February 2021

Tibor Nagy (born 14 August 1991) is a Hungarian football player who plays for Monor.

== Club statistics ==
Appearances and goals by club, season and competition
| Club | Season | League | | | Cup | | League Cup | | Europe | | Total | |
| Club | Season | Division | Apps | Goals | Apps | Goals | Apps | Goals | Apps | Goals | Apps | Goals |
|---|---|---|---|---|---|---|---|---|---|---|---|---|
MTK Budapest
| MTK Budapest | 2009–10 | Nemzeti Bajnokság I | 0 | 0 | 3 | 1 | 4 | 0 | 0 | 0 | 7 | 1 |
| MTK Budapest | 2010–11 | Nemzeti Bajnokság I | 0 | 0 | 2 | 0 | 1 | 0 | 0 | 0 | 3 | 0 |
| MTK Budapest | 2012–13 | Nemzeti Bajnokság I | 5 | 0 | 1 | 0 | 4 | 0 | 0 | 0 | 10 | 0 |
| MTK Budapest | 2013–14 | Nemzeti Bajnokság I | 17 | 0 | 3 | 0 | 2 | 0 | 0 | 0 | 22 | 0 |
| MTK Budapest | 2014–15 | Nemzeti Bajnokság I | 18 | 0 | 2 | 0 | 8 | 0 | 0 | 0 | 28 | 0 |
| MTK Budapest | Total | | 40 | 0 | 11 | 1 | 19 | 0 | 0 | 0 | 70 | 1 |
| Szigetszentmiklós | 2011–12 | Nemzeti Bajnokság II | 21 | 1 | 2 | 0 | — | | 0 | 0 | 23 | 1 |
Újpest
| Újpest | 2015–16 | Nemzeti Bajnokság I | 9 | 0 | 3 | 0 | — | | 0 | 0 | 12 | 0 |
| Újpest | 2016–17 | Nemzeti Bajnokság I | 15 | 0 | 2 | 0 | — | | 0 | 0 | 17 | 0 |
| Újpest | Total | | 24 | 0 | 5 | 0 | 0 | 0 | 0 | 0 | 29 | 0 |
Diósgyőr
| Diósgyőr | 2016–17 | Nemzeti Bajnokság I | 2 | 0 | 0 | 0 | — | | 0 | 0 | 2 | 0 |
| Diósgyőr | 2017–18 | Nemzeti Bajnokság I | 16 | 0 | 5 | 0 | — | | 0 | 0 | 21 | 0 |
| Diósgyőr | 2018–19 | Nemzeti Bajnokság I | 2 | 0 | 2 | 1 | — | | 0 | 0 | 4 | 1 |
| Diósgyőr | Total | | 20 | 0 | 7 | 1 | 0 | 0 | 0 | 0 | 27 | 1 |
| Bicske | 2019–20 | Nemzeti Bajnokság III | 16 | 1 | 0 | 0 | — | | — | | 16 | 1 |
| III. Kerület | 2020–21 | Nemzeti Bajnokság III | 26 | 0 | 2 | 0 | — | | — | | 28 | 0 |
| Monor | 2021–22 | Nemzeti Bajnokság III | 15 | 0 | 2 | 0 | — | | — | | 17 | 0 |
| Career total | | | 162 | 1 | 29 | 2 | 19 | 0 | 0 | 0 | 210 | 4 |

Updated to games played as of 7 February 2022.
