= Nemanja Andrić =

Serbian footballer (born 1987)

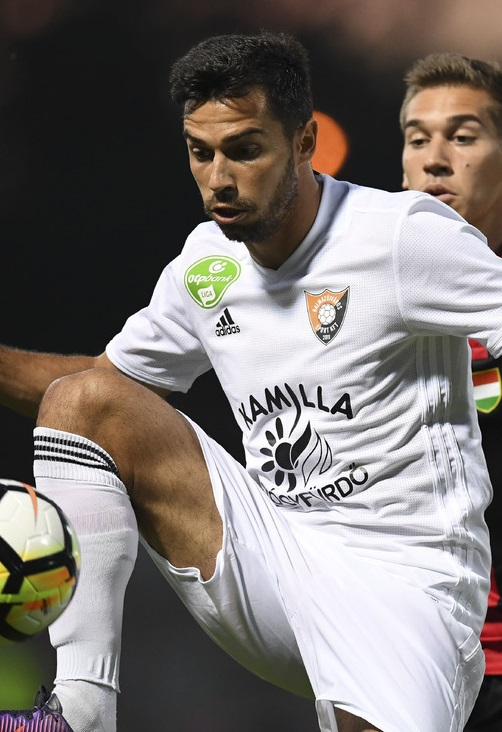
- Andrić playing for Balmazújváros in 2017

Personal information
- Date of birth: 13 June 1987 (age 39)
- Place of birth: Lazarevac, SFR Yugoslavia
- Height: 1.81 m (5 ft 11 1/2 in)
- Position: Midfielder

Team information
- Current team: Karcag

Senior career*
Years	Team	Apps	(Gls)
2004–2005	Obilić	1	(0)
2005–2012	Rad	154	(9)
2012–2015	Győr	62	(10)
2015–2017	Újpest	64	(14)
2017–2018	Balmazújváros	25	(6)
2018–2020	Győr	57	(15)
2020–2021	Kaposvár	33	(2)
2021–2022	Kolubara	34	(3)
2023	Vršac	18	(6)
2023-	Karcag	13	(2)
- * Club domestic league appearances and goals as of 1 March 2024

Nemanja Andrić (Serbian Cyrillic: Немања Aндpић; born 13 June 1987) is a Serbian professional footballer who plays as a midfielder for Hungarian third-tier side Karcag.

He has been playing with Rad since 2005, when he came from another Belgrade's club, FK Obilić.

== Club statistics ==
Club	Season	League		Cup		League Cup		Europe		Total	
Club	Season	Apps	Goals	Apps	Goals	Apps	Goals	Apps	Goals	Apps	Goals
Rad Belgrade
Rad Belgrade	2009–10	28	4	0	0	–	–	–	–	28	4
Rad Belgrade	2010–11	28	2	1	0	–	–	–	–	29	2
Rad Belgrade	2011–12	20	1	0	0	–	–	4	0	24	1
Rad Belgrade	Total	76	7	1	0	0	0	4	0	81	7
Győr
Győr	2012–13	21	3	9	6	6	3	–	–	36	12
Győr	2013–14	29	7	5	2	5	1	2	0	41	10
Győr	2014–15	12	0	3	0	4	0	2	1	21	1
Győr	Total	62	10	17	8	15	4	4	1	98	23
Újpest
Újpest	2014–15	10	5	3	0	–	–	–	–	13	5
Újpest	2015–16	25	4	7	3	–	–	–	–	32	7
Újpest	2016–17	29	5	6	1	–	–	–	–	35	6
Újpest	Total	64	14	16	4	0	0	0	0	80	18
Balmazújváros
Balmazújváros	2017–18	25	6	6	0	–	–	–	–	31	6
Balmazújváros	Total	25	6	6	0	0	0	0	0	31	6
Career Total		227	37	40	12	15	4	8	1	290	54

Updated to games played as of 2 June 2018.
