= Kylian Hazard =

Belgian footballer (born 1995)

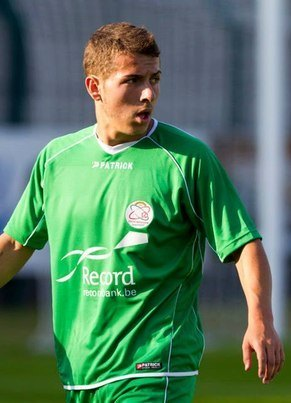
- Hazard with Zulte Waregem in 2014

Personal information
- Full name: Kylian Hazard
- Date of birth: 5 August 1995 (age 31)
- Place of birth: La Louvière, Belgium
- Height: 1.72 m (5 ft 8 in)
- Position: Attacking midfielder

Team information
- Current team: RFC Liège
- Number: 10

Youth career
- 2001–2011: Tubize
- 2011–2013: Lille

Senior career*
Years	Team	Apps	(Gls)
2013–2014	White Star Bruxelles	4	(0)
2014–2015	Zulte Waregem	2	(0)
2015–2017	Újpest	34	(3)
2017–2019	Chelsea	0	(0)
2018–2019	→ Cercle Brugge (loan)	21	(4)
2019–2022	Cercle Brugge	45	(2)
2022	→ RWDM (loan)	8	(2)
2022–2024	RWDM	22	(6)
2024	→ Beveren (loan)	3	(0)
2024–2025	Tubize-Braine	18	(3)
2025–	RFC Liège	24	(2)
- * Club domestic league appearances and goals as of 19 April 2026

Kylian Hazard (born 5 August 1995) is a Belgian professional footballer who plays as an attacking midfielder for Challenger Pro League club RFC Liège. He has two older brothers, Eden and Thorgan, and one younger, Ethan, with Thorgan and Ethan being fellow footballers.

== Early life ==
Hazard was born in La Louvière and grew up in Braine-le-Comte. His mother, Carine, and father, Thierry, were both footballers playing in Belgium. His father spent most of his career playing as a semi-professional for La Louvière in the Belgian Second Division. He played mainly as a defensive midfielder. His mother played as a striker in the Belgian Women's First Division and stopped playing when she was three months pregnant with her eldest son Eden Hazard. After playing football, both his parents became sports teachers. Thierry retired from his position in 2009 in order to devote more time to his children.

Kylian is the third of four children. His eldest brother, Eden, previously played for Lille in France, Chelsea in England and Real Madrid in Spain. His other elder brother, Thorgan, joined Eden at Chelsea in 2012 before moving to Borussia Mönchengladbach in 2015. Thorgan moved to Dortmund in May 2019 (summer transfer window) and had previously progressed through the youth ranks of Lille's biggest rivals Lens. His younger brother Ethan came up through the youth academy of A.F.C. Tubize and its successor Royale Union Tubize-Braine, where Eden, Thorgan and Kylian all played earlier in their lives, and currently plays for FC Ganshoren.

Kylian and his three brothers were raised in a comfortable environment with their parents ensuring they had whatever they needed to excel. The family lived "no more than three meters" from a football training ground and the brothers often ventured onto a training pitch through a small hole in order to hone and develop their skills.

Hazard began his professional career at White Star Bruxelles, joining the club in 2013 from the Lille academy where he spent two years.

== Club career ==
After spending one season in the Belgian Second Division, it was announced on 25 June 2014 that Hazard joined Pro League side Zulte Waregem on a two-year contract, with an option to extend the contract for another season. In signing for Zulte Waregem, Hazard followed in the footsteps of his older brother Thorgan, who spent two seasons there on loan from Chelsea, and linked up with Jonathan Benteke, whose brother Christian is also a Belgian international.

Hazard made his professional debut for Zulte Waregem on 7 August 2014, replacing Ibrahima Conté after 69 minutes against Belarusian side Shakhtyor Soligorsk in the third qualifying round of the UEFA Europa League. He could not help prevent his team from crashing out in the tournament after a 2–2 draw and a 7–4 loss on aggregate.

Hazard made his first start for Zulte Waregem on 21 January 2015 against R.S.C. Anderlecht in second leg of the Belgian Cup; the match ended in a 4–2 loss. He played only 5 games for Zulte Waregem.

On 27 June 2015, Hazard signed a three-year contract with Hungarian side Újpest. Hazard made his debut on 18 July 2015 against Paksi FC which ended in a 0–0 draw. On 21 November 2015, Hazard scored his first goal in a 2–1 away victory over Honvéd.

On 29 August 2017, Hazard joined Premier League side Chelsea, and was put in the club's development squad. Despite reports suggesting Hazard had left Chelsea after a year, he agreed a new two-year deal and was sent out on loan to Cercle Brugge on a season-long loan.

On 5 May 2019, it was announced that Hazard's spell at Cercle Brugge would be made permanent as of 1 July 2019. In January 2021, he was demoted to the reserves for disciplinary reasons.

On 31 January 2022, Hazard was loaned to RWDM until the end of the season, with an option to buy. He made his competitive debut for the club on 13 February, coming on as a substitute for Thomas Ephestion in the 79th minute of a 1–0 Belgian First Division B win over Deinze. Following the loan, Cercle Brugge terminated his contract and signed a two-year contract with RWDM.

Hazard helped RWDM achieve promotion to the 2023–24 Belgian Pro League, however, he suffered an ACL tear in the summer of 2023 and was not able to appear for the club in the first half of the season.

On 1 February 2024, Hazard moved on loan to Beveren.

On 11 June 2025, Hazard signed a two-year contract with RFC Liège.

== Career statistics ==
As of match played 23 June 2022.

Appearances and goals by club, season and competition
Club	Season	League			National cup		League cup		Europe		Other		Total	
Club	Season	Division	Apps	Goals	Apps	Goals	Apps	Goals	Apps	Goals	Apps	Goals	Apps	Goals
White Star Bruxelles	2013–14	Belgian Second Division	4	0	1	0	—		—		—		5	0
Zulte Waregem	2014–15	Belgian Pro League	2	0	2	0	—		1 (Note: Appearance in UEFA Europa League)	0	—		5	0
Újpest	2015–16	Nemzeti Bajnokság I	29	3	6	1	—		—		—		35	4
Újpest	2016–17	Nemzeti Bajnokság I	5	0	2	0	—		—		—		7	0
Újpest	Total		34	3	8	1	—		—		—		42	4
Chelsea	2017–18	Premier League	0	0	0	0	0	0	0	0	0	0	0	0
Chelsea	2018–19	Premier League	0	0	0	0	0	0	0	0	0	0	0	0
Chelsea	Total		0	0	0	0	0	0	0	0	0	0	0	0
Cercle Brugge (loan)	2018–19	Belgian First Division A	17	4	1	0	—		—		4 (Note: Appearances in Belgian First Division A European play-offs)	0	22	4
Cercle Brugge	2019–20	Belgian First Division A	27	1	1	0	—		—		0	0	28	1
Cercle Brugge	2020–21	Belgian First Division A	18	1	0	0	—		—		0	0	18	1
Cercle Brugge	Total		62	6	2	0	—		—		4	0	68	6
RWDM (loan)	2021–22	Belgian First Division B	8	2	0	0	—		—		2 (Note: Appearances in Promotion-Relegation play-offs)	0	10	2
RWDM (loan)	2022–23	Belgian First Division B	0	0	0	0	—		—		0	0	0	0
RWDM (loan)	Total		8	2	0	0	—		—		2	0	10	2
Career total			84	8	13	1	0	0	1	0	4	0	92	9
