= Jonathan Heris =

Belgian footballer (born 1990)

Personal information
- Full name: Jonathan Steve Heris
- Date of birth: 3 September 1990 (age 36)
- Place of birth: Brussels, Belgium
- Height: 1.84 m (6 ft 0 in)
- Position: Centre-back

Team information
- Current team: Holstebro

Youth career
- 1996–1998: SV Alsemberg
- 1998–2002: Anderlecht
- 2002–2008: Brussels

Senior career*
| Years | Team | Apps | (Gls) |
| 2009–2013 | Brussels | 92 | (2) |
| 2013 | RWS Bruxelles | 5 | (3) |
| 2013–2014 | Tubize | 21 | (3) |
| 2014–2017 | Újpest | 81 | (5) |
| 2017–2019 | Puskás Akadémia | 43 | (1) |
| 2019–2020 | Újpest | 26 | (1) |
| 2020–2022 | Eupen | 54 | (4) |
| 2022–2024 | RWD Molenbeek | 37 | (1) |
| 2025– | Holstebro | | |
- * Club domestic league appearances and goals as of 28 March 2024

Jonathan Steve Heris (born 3 September 1990) is a Belgian professional footballer who plays as a centre-back for Danish 3rd Division side Holstebro Boldklub.

== Professional career ==
In the 2008–09 season, Heris was promoted from the youth academy of FC Brussels to the first team. Over time, he grew into a starter there. After shorter stints at RWS Bruxelles and Tubize, both competing at the second highest level in Belgium, he moved abroad in January 2014. Heris signed a contract with the Hungarian first division team Újpest, partly due to the Belgian chairman of the club, Roland Duchâtelet. At Újpest, Heris became an undisputed starter in defense. In his first season, the club won the Hungarian Cup. After three-and-a-half seasons, he moved to rivals Puskás Akadémia. After two seasons there, Heris returned to Újpest.

On 14 July 2020, it was announced that Eupen had signed Heris on a two-year contract. On 10 August, he made his debut in the starting line-up against Oud-Heverlee Leuven.

In the summer of 2022, Heris returned to RWD Molenbeek on a two-year contract. He left the club in July 2024.

In February 2025, after moving to Danish city Struer, Heris signed an amateur contract with Danish 3rd Division club Holstebro.

== Club statistics ==
Updated to games played as of 27 June 2020.

| Club | Season | League | | Cup | | League Cup | | Europe | | Total | |
| Club | Season | Apps | Goals | Apps | Goals | Apps | Goals | Apps | Goals | Apps | Goals |
|---|---|---|---|---|---|---|---|---|---|---|---|
Brussels
| Brussels | 2008–09 | 3 | 0 | 0 | 0 | 0 | 0 | 0 | 0 | 3 | 0 |
| Brussels | 2009–10 | 18 | 2 | 0 | 0 | 0 | 0 | 0 | 0 | 18 | 2 |
| Brussels | 2010–11 | 24 | 0 | 0 | 0 | 0 | 0 | 0 | 0 | 24 | 0 |
| Brussels | 2011–12 | 31 | 0 | 0 | 0 | 0 | 0 | 0 | 0 | 31 | 0 |
| Brussels | 2012–13 | 16 | 0 | 2 | 0 | 0 | 0 | 0 | 0 | 18 | 0 |
| Brussels | Total | 92 | 2 | 2 | 0 | 0 | 0 | 0 | 0 | 94 | 2 |
White Star
| White Star | 2012–13 | 5 | 3 | 0 | 0 | 0 | 0 | 0 | 0 | 5 | 3 |
| White Star | Total | 5 | 3 | 0 | 0 | 0 | 0 | 0 | 0 | 5 | 3 |
Tubize
| Tubize | 2013–14 | 12 | 2 | 1 | 0 | 0 | 0 | 0 | 0 | 13 | 2 |
| Tubize | Total | 12 | 2 | 1 | 0 | 0 | 0 | 0 | 0 | 13 | 2 |
Újpest
| Újpest | 2013–14 | 10 | 0 | 5 | 0 | 0 | 0 | – | – | 15 | 0 |
| Újpest | 2014–15 | 27 | 3 | 6 | 0 | 5 | 0 | – | – | 38 | 3 |
| Újpest | 2015–16 | 24 | 0 | 6 | 0 | – | – | – | – | 30 | 0 |
| Újpest | 2016–17 | 20 | 2 | 4 | 0 | – | – | – | – | 24 | 2 |
| Újpest | 2019–20 | 26 | 1 | 4 | 1 | – | – | – | – | 30 | 2 |
| Újpest | Total | 107 | 6 | 25 | 1 | 5 | 0 | 0 | 0 | 137 | 7 |
Puskás Akadémia
| Puskás Akadémia | 2017–18 | 22 | 1 | 3 | 0 | – | – | – | – | 25 | 1 |
| Puskás Akadémia | 2018–19 | 21 | 0 | 5 | 0 | – | – | – | – | 26 | 0 |
| Puskás Akadémia | Total | 43 | 1 | 8 | 0 | 0 | 0 | 0 | 0 | 51 | 1 |
| Career total | | 259 | 14 | 36 | 1 | 5 | 0 | 0 | 0 | 300 | 15 |

== Honours ==
Újpest

- Hungarian Cup: 2013–14
