= Dávid Kálnoki-Kis =

Hungarian footballer (born 1991)

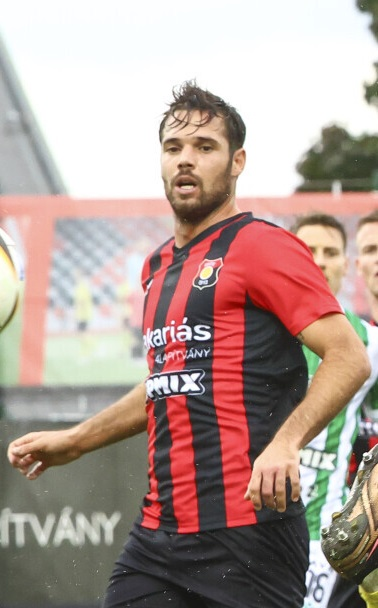
- Kálnoki-Kis playing for Budafok in 2024

Personal information
- Date of birth: 6 August 1991 (age 35)
- Place of birth: Budapest, Hungary
- Height: 1.87 m (6 ft 1 1/2 in)
- Position: Defender

Team information
- Current team: Budafok
- Number: 4

Youth career
- 2002–2006: MAC
- 2006–2010: MTK
- 2009–2010: → Oldham (loan)

Senior career*
Years	Team	Apps	(Gls)
2010–2015	MTK Budapest	80	(3)
2015–2018	Újpest	51	(1)
2018–2020	Budapest Honvéd	16	(1)
2018–2020	→ Honvéd II	14	(0)
2021–2023	Zalaegerszeg	57	(1)
2023–2024	Budapest Honvéd	18	(0)
2024–	Budafok	37	(0)

International career^{‡}
2010–2011	Hungary U19	2	(0)
2011–2012	Hungary U21	9	(1)
- * Club domestic league appearances and goals as of 31 May 2026 ‡ National team caps and goals as of 5 June 2012

Dávid Kálnoki-Kis (born 6 August 1991) is a Hungarian professional footballer who plays as a defender for Nemzeti Bajnokság II club Budafok.

== Club career ==
He joined English club Oldham Athletic on loan in 2009 as part of an agreement between Oldham, MTK and Liverpool. He joined the club's new Development squad. He was given the no. 31 squad number and was named as substitute for the first-team on a number of occasions. In February 2010 he returned to MTK after his loan period was cut short.

== International career ==
Kálnoki-Kis has represented Hungary at international level as an under-17, under-19 and under-21. He was called up to the senior Hungary squad to face Faroe Islands in August 2016.

== Career statistics ==
Appearances and goals by club, season and competition
Club	Season	League			Cup		League Cup		Europe		Total	
Club	Season	Division	Apps	Goals	Apps	Goals	Apps	Goals	Apps	Goals	Apps	Goals
MTK
MTK	2008–09	Nemzeti Bajnokság I	0	0	1	0	0	0	0	0	1	0
MTK	2009–10	Nemzeti Bajnokság I	0	0	0	0	0	0	0	0	0	0
MTK	2010–11	Nemzeti Bajnokság I	5	0	0	0	2	0	0	0	7	0
MTK	2011–12	Nemzeti Bajnokság II	25	2	9	0	1	0	0	0	35	2
MTK	2012–13	Nemzeti Bajnokság I	12	1	0	0	0	0	1	0	13	1
MTK	2013–14	Nemzeti Bajnokság I	29	0	6	0	2	0	0	0	37	0
MTK	2014–15	Nemzeti Bajnokság I	14	0	1	0	5	0	0	0	20	0
MTK	Total		85	3	17	0	10	0	1	0	113	3
Újpest
Újpest	2015–16	Nemzeti Bajnokság I	22	1	5	0	—		—		27	1
Újpest	2016–17	Nemzeti Bajnokság I	20	0	2	0	—		—		22	0
Újpest	2017–18	Nemzeti Bajnokság I	9	0	3	1	—		—		12	1
Újpest	Total		51	1	10	1	0	0	0	0	61	2
Honvéd
Honvéd	2018–19	Nemzeti Bajnokság I	8	0	5	1	—		0	0	13	1
Honvéd	2019–20	Nemzeti Bajnokság I	8	1	4	1	—		2	0	14	2
Honvéd	Total		16	1	9	2	0	0	2	0	27	3
Zalaegerszeg
Zalaegerszeg	2020–21	Nemzeti Bajnokság I	11	1	1	0	—		—		12	1
Zalaegerszeg	2021–22	Nemzeti Bajnokság I	0	0	0	0	—		—		0	0
Zalaegerszeg	Total		11	1	1	0	0	0	0	0	11	1
Career total			163	6	37	3	10	0	3	0	212	9

Updated to games played as of 19 May 2021.

== Honours ==
Újpest

- Magyar Kupa: 2017–18

Honvéd

- Magyar Kupa: 2019–20

Zalaegerszeg

- Magyar Kupa: 2022–23
