= Viktor Angelov =

Macedonian footballer

Personal information
- Full name: Viktor Angelov
- Date of birth: 27 March 1994 (age 32)
- Place of birth: Dortmund, Germany
- Height: 1.80 m (5 ft 11 in)
- Position: Forward

Team information
- Current team: Vushtrria
- Number: 10

Youth career
- –2009: Borussia Dortmund
- 2010–2011: Rabotnički
- 2010–2011: → Schalke 04 (loan)

Senior career*
Years	Team	Apps	(Gls)
2010–2013	Rabotnički	34	(4)
2013	→ Teteks (loan)	0	(0)
2013–2016	Metalurg Skopje	58	(6)
2016–2018	Újpest	31	(2)
2018	→ Rabotnički (loan)	15	(5)
2018–2019	Shkupi	29	(7)
2019–2021	Široki Brijeg	20	(7)
2021–2022	Voluntari	24	(1)
2022–2023	Brera Strumica	25	(3)
2023–2024	Gloria Buzău	17	(2)
2024–	Vushtrria	0	(0)

International career
2009–2010	Macedonia U17	3	(0)
2012–2013	Macedonia U19	7	(2)
2014–2017	Macedonia U21	14	(3)
2015	Macedonia	1	(0)
- * Club domestic league appearances and goals as of 1 July 2024

Viktor Angelov (Macedonian: Виктор Ангелов; born 27 March 1994) is a Macedonian professional footballer who plays as a forward for Vushtrria.

== International career ==
Angelov made his senior debut for Macedonia in a November 2015 friendly match against Lebanon, as of February 2020, his sole international game.

== Honours ==
Rabotnički

- Macedonian Cup runner-up: 2009–10, 2011–12

Metalurg Skopje

- Macedonian Cup runner-up: 2013–14
