= Benjámin Cseke =

Hungarian footballer (born 1994)

Personal information
- Date of birth: 22 July 1994 (age 32)
- Place of birth: Budapest, Hungary
- Height: 1.84 m (6 ft 0 in)
- Position: Midfielder

Team information
- Current team: Vasas
- Number: 94

Youth career
- 2007–2009: Honvéd
- 2009–2012: Vasas

Senior career*
Years	Team	Apps	(Gls)
2012–2014	Vasas	43	(8)
2014–2016	MTK Budapest	4	(0)
2015–2016	→ Újpest (loan)	16	(0)
2016–2019	Újpest	41	(2)
2019–2020	Paks	7	(1)
2019–2020	→ MTK Budapest (loan)	17	(2)
2020–2021	MTK Budapest	29	(2)
2021–2024	Mezőkövesd	61	(5)
2022–2023	→ DVTK (loan)	26	(4)
2024–	Vasas	28	(1)

International career
2014	Hungary U20	1	(0)
2016	Hungary U21	4	(0)
- * Club domestic league appearances and goals as of 31 May 2026

Benjámin Cseke (born 22 July 1994) is a Hungarian football player who plays for Vasas.

== Career ==
=== MTK Budapest ===
On 30 August 2019 it was confirmed, that Cseke had returned to MTK Budapest FC on loan with an option to buy from Paksi FC until the summer 2020. MTK announced on 21 January 2020, that the club had triggered the option and signed a long-term deal with the club.

== Career statistics ==
Appearances and goals by club, season and competition
Club	Season	League			Cup		League Cup		Europe		Total	
Club	Season	Division	Apps	Goals	Apps	Goals	Apps	Goals	Apps	Goals	Apps	Goals
Vasas
Vasas	2012–13	Nemzeti Bajnokság II	14	4	4	0	0	0	—		18	4
Vasas	2013–14	Nemzeti Bajnokság II	29	4	1	0	5	0	—		35	4
Vasas	Total		43	8	5	0	5	0	—		53	8
MTK
MTK	2014–15	Nemzeti Bajnokság I	4	0	2	2	8	0	—		14	2
MTK	2019–20	Nemzeti Bajnokság II	17	2	8	1	—		—		25	3
MTK	2020–21	Nemzeti Bajnokság I	29	2	3	0	—		—		32	2
MTK	Total		50	4	13	3	8	0	—		71	7
Újpest
Újpest	2015–16	Nemzeti Bajnokság I	16	0	8	3	—		—		24	3
Újpest	2016–17	Nemzeti Bajnokság I	29	2	6	0	—		—		35	2
Újpest	2017–18	Nemzeti Bajnokság I	11	0	4	0	—		—		15	0
Újpest	2018–19	Nemzeti Bajnokság I	1	0	1	1	—		2	0	4	1
Újpest	Total		57	2	19	4	—		2	0	78	6
Paks
Paks	2018–19	Nemzeti Bajnokság I	5	1	0	0	—		—		5	1
Paks	2019–20	Nemzeti Bajnokság I	2	0	0	0	—		—		2	0
Paks	Total		7	1	0	0	—		—		7	1
Career total			157	15	37	7	13	0	2	0	209	22

Updated to games played as of 15 May 2021.
