= János Lázok =

Hungarian footballer

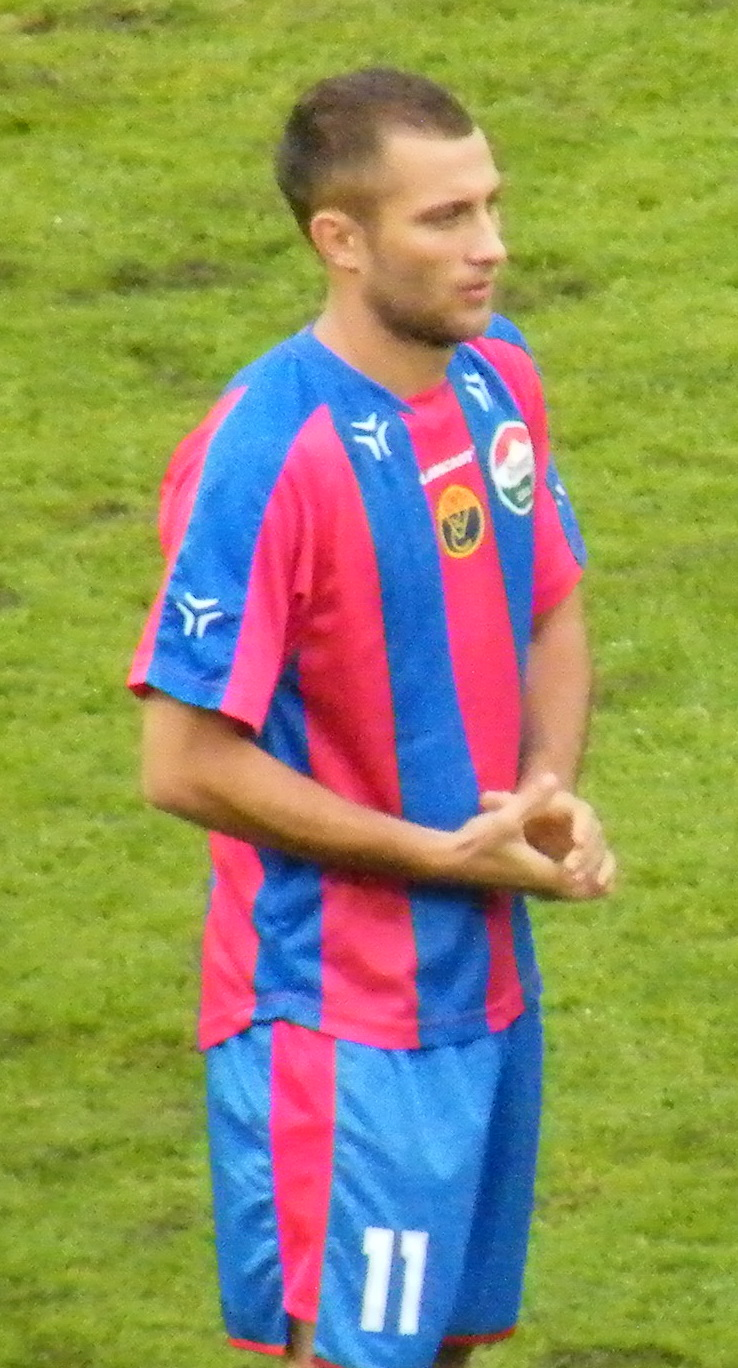

Personal information
- Full name: János Lázok
- Date of birth: 4 October 1984 (age 42)
- Place of birth: Elek, Hungary
- Height: 1.84 m (6 ft 1/2 in)
- Position: Midfielder

Team information
- Current team: Vasas
- Number: 19

Senior career*
Years	Team	Apps	(Gls)
2002–2004	Gyula	19	(1)
2004–2005	Békéscsaba	25	(1)
2005–2011	Vasas	98	(27)
2010–2011	→ MTK (loan)	14	(5)
2011–2012	MSV Duisburg	6	(0)
2012	MTK	3	(0)
2012–2014	Paks	29	(9)
2013–2014	→ Győr (loan)	6	(1)
2014–2016	Vasas	24	(2)
2016–	Újpest	3	(1)

International career
2010	Hungary	2	(0)
- * Club domestic league appearances and goals as of 3 August 2016

János Lázok (born 4 October 1984, in Elek) is a Hungarian football player who currently plays for Gyori ETO.

== MSV Duisburg ==
He made his debut against Union Berlin, where he was a titular.
