= Souleymane Diarra =

Malian footballer

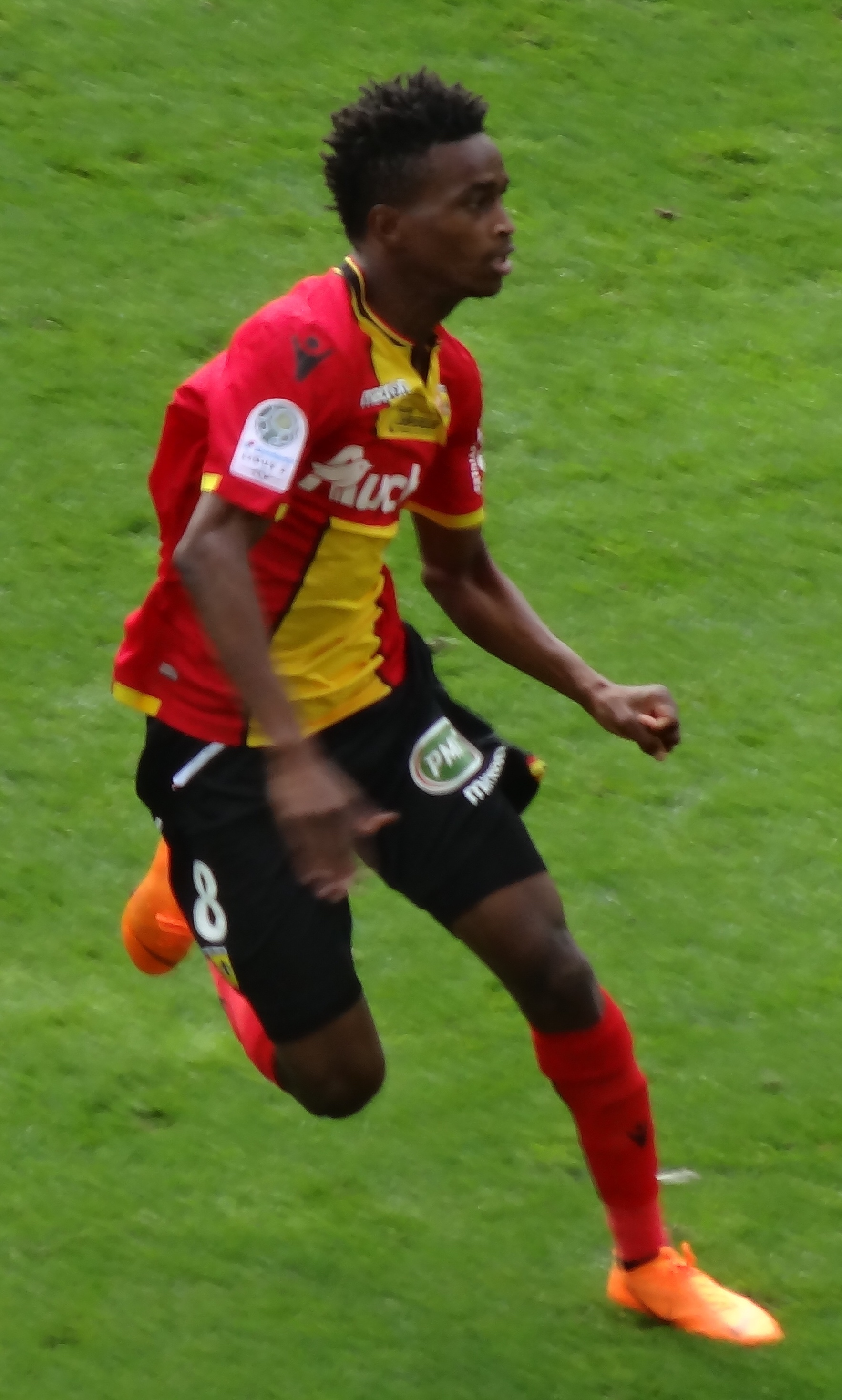
- Diarra with Lens in 2018

Personal information
- Date of birth: 30 January 1995 (age 31)
- Place of birth: Bamako, Mali
- Height: 1.73 m (5 ft 8 in)
- Position: Midfielder

Team information
- Current team: Feignies Aulnoye

Youth career
- JMG Bamako

Senior career*
Years	Team	Apps	(Gls)
2013–2014	AS Bamako	2	(0)
2014–2015	Wydad Casablanca	0	(0)
2015–2018	Újpest	39	(4)
2017–2018	→ Lens (loan)	29	(4)
2018–2019	Lens	33	(1)
2019–2020	Gaziantep	24	(2)
2021	Pau FC	17	(0)
2021–2023	Guingamp	36	(0)
2024–	Feignies Aulnoye	9	(2)

International career^{‡}
2014–2016	Mali U20	17	(2)
2017–	Mali	7	(0)
Medal record
Representing Mali
FIFA U-20 World Cup
Third place	2015 New Zealand	U-20 Team
- * Club domestic league appearances and goals as of 7 December 2024 ‡ National team caps and goals as of 4 May 2021

Souleymane Diarra (born 30 January 1995) is a Malian professional footballer who plays as a midfielder for French Championnat National 1 club Feignies Aulnoye.

== Club career ==
In August 2015, Diarra joined Hungarian side Újpest FC on a three-year deal.

On 3 August 2019, Diarra signed a three-year contract with Turkish Süper Lig club Gazişehir Gaziantep.

On 18 January 2021, Diarra signed with Ligue 2 club Pau FC.

== International career ==
Diarra was part of the Malian squad reaching 2015 FIFA U-20 World Cup semi-final. He also played in the 2016 Toulon Tournament. Diarra made his senior debut for the Mali national football team in a 3–1 win against China, wherein he got a red card on the 38th minute on 29 June 2016.
