= 2014–15 Békéscsaba 1912 Előre season =

Békéscsaba
2014–15 season
- Manager: Zoran Spišljak
- Stadium: Stadion Kórház utcai (Home stadium); Grosics Gyula Akadémia (from 1 March to 16 March)
- Nemzeti Bajnokság II: 2nd (promoted)
- Magyar Kupa: Round of 16
- Ligakupa: Round of 16
- Top goalscorer: League: Botond Birtalan; Péter Szilágyi (9 each); All: Botond Birtalan (13)
- Highest home attendance: 6,200 (vs Cegléd, 31 May 2015)
- Lowest home attendance: 100 (multiple league cup matches)
| Home colours | Away colours |

The 2014–15 season was Békéscsaba 1912 Előre's 97th competitive season, 7th consecutive season in the Nemzeti Bajnokság II and 102nd year in existence as a football club. In addition to the domestic league, Békéscsaba participated in this season's editions of the Magyar Kupa and Ligakupa.

In the middle of the season, the turf of the Békéscsaba stadium was replaced, therefore the team temporarily played their home fixtures in Gyula, at the Grosics Gyula Akadémia. Despite the unique circumstances the team went undefeated in the second half of the season in the league, with promotion achieved in the last round since the last time they had played in the Nemzeti Bajnokság I 10 years ago.

== Kits ==
| Home | Away | Goalkeeper |

== First team squad ==
The players listed had league appearances and stayed until the end of the season.

Note: Flags indicate national team as defined under FIFA eligibility rules; some limited exceptions apply. Players may hold more than one non-FIFA nationality.

| No. | Pos. | Nation | Player |
|---|---|---|---|
| 3 | MF | HUN | Máté Zsilinszki |
| 4 | MF | HUN | Viktor Tölgyesi |
| 5 | DF | HUN | Balázs Koszó |
| 6 | FW | HUN | Botond Birtalan |
| 7 | MF | HUN | Richárd Balázs |
| 8 | DF | HUN | István Bagi |
| 9 | FW | HUN | Thomas Prasler |
| 10 | MF | HUN | István Spitzmüller |
| 11 | DF | HUN | Zsolt Balog (captain) |
| 13 | MF | HUN | Márkó Pilán |
| 14 | MF | HUN | Bálint Borbély |
| 15 | DF | HUN | Zsolt Fehér |

| No. | Pos. | Nation | Player |
|---|---|---|---|
| 16 | FW | HUN | Roland Vólent |
| 17 | FW | HUN | Tamás Kertész |
| 18 | MF | HUN | Patrik Király |
| 19 | DF | HUN | Miklós Balogh |
| 20 | FW | HUN | Péter Szilágyi |
| 21 | DF | HUN | György Juhász |
| 22 | DF | HUN | Ádám Viczián |
| 23 | DF | HUN | Balázs Bényei |
| 24 | FW | HUN | Péter Berki |
| 25 | MF | HUN | Milán Balogh |
| 32 | GK | HUN | Roland Mursits |
| 90 | GK | HUN | Dániel Póser |

== Transfers ==
=== Transfers in ===
| Transfer window | Pos. | No. | Name | From |
|---|---|---|---|---|
| Summer | DF | 3 | (Hungary) Mihály Szántó | Kaposvár |
| Summer | MF | 4 | (Hungary) Viktor Tölgyesi | Kecskemét |
| Summer | MF | 7 | (Hungary) Richárd Balázs | Soproni VSE |
| Summer | FW | 14 | (Hungary) Bálint Borbély | Szabadkígyós |
| Summer | DF | 15 | (Hungary) Dániel Zámbori | Kaposvár |
| Summer | DF | 19 | (Hungary) Miklós Balogh | Free agent (Note: Previous club: Szigetszentmiklós.) |
| Summer | FW | 20 | (Hungary) Péter Szilágyi | Nyíregyháza |
| Summer | DF | 22 | (Hungary) Ádám Viczián | Youth team |
| Summer | FW | 24 | (Hungary) Péter Berki | BKV Előre |
| Winter | MF | 10 | (Hungary) István Spitzmüller | Free agent (Note: Previous club: Nyíregyháza.) |
| Winter | MF | 13 | (Hungary) Márkó Pilán | Youth team |
| Winter | DF | 15 | (Hungary) Dániel Zámbori | Youth team |
| Winter | DF | 15 | (Hungary) Zsolt Fehér | Siófok |
| Winter | GK | 32 | (Hungary) Roland Mursits | Haladás |

=== Transfers out ===
| Transfer window | Pos. | No. | Name | To |
|---|---|---|---|---|
| Summer | FW | 9 | (Romania) Alexandru Leucuță | (Romania) Olt Slatina |
| Summer | FW | 10 | (Hungary) Gábor Pozsár | Szeged |
| Summer | FW | 17 | (Colombia) Arbey Mosquera | Released |
| Summer | DF | 19 | (Central African Republic) Calvin Tolmbaye | (Romania) Mioveni |
| Summer | DF | 22 | (Hungary) Tamás Horváth | Retired |
| Summer | GK | 32 | (Montenegro) Nemanja Šćekić | Released |
| Winter | DF | 13 | (Hungary) Zsolt Pataki | Released (Note: Joined Gyula in January 2015.) |
| Winter | MF | 15 | (Hungary) János Soós | Released |

=== Loans in ===
| Transfer window | Pos. | No. | Name | From | End date |
|---|---|---|---|---|---|
| Summer | GK | 1 | (Hungary) Márton Czuczi | Budapest Honvéd | January 2015 |
| Summer | FW | 10 | (Hungary) Attila Lőrinczy | Budapest Honvéd | January 2015 |
| Summer | FW | 16 | (Hungary) Roland Vólent | Budapest Honvéd | End of season |
| Summer | FW | 17 | (Hungary) Tamás Kertész | Debrecen | End of season |
| Summer | DF | 23 | (Hungary) Balázs Bényei | Debrecen | End of season |

=== Loans out ===
| Transfer window | Pos. | No. | Name | From | End date |

== Competitions ==
=== Overview ===
| Competition | First match | Last match | Starting round | Final position | Record | | | | | | | |
| Competition | First match | Last match | Starting round | Final position | Pld | W | D | L | GF | GA | GD | Win % |
|---|---|---|---|---|---|---|---|---|---|---|---|---|
| Nemzeti Bajnokság II | 16 August 2014 | 31 May 2015 | Matchday 1 | 2nd | 30 | 18 | 7 | 5 | 42 | 23 | +19 | 60.00 |
| Magyar Kupa | 9 August 2014 | 29 October 2014 | Round of 128 | Round of 16 | 4 | 3 | 0 | 1 | 9 | 5 | +4 | 75.00 |
| Ligakupa | 2 September 2014 | 9 December 2014 | Group stage | Round of 16 | 8 | 3 | 1 | 4 | 12 | 17 | −5 | 37.50 |
| Total | | | | | 42 | 24 | 8 | 10 | 63 | 45 | +18 | 57.14 |

Source: Competitions

=== Nemzeti Bajnokság II ===
==== League table ====
| Pos | Team | Pld | W | D | L | GF | GA | GD | Pts | Promotion or relegation |
|---|---|---|---|---|---|---|---|---|---|---|
| 1 | Vasas (C, P) | 30 | 21 | 3 | 6 | 68 | 31 | +37 | 66 | Promotion to Nemzeti Bajnokság I |
| 2 | Békéscsaba (P) | 30 | 18 | 7 | 5 | 42 | 23 | +19 | 61 | Promotion to Nemzeti Bajnokság I |
| 3 | Gyirmót | 30 | 16 | 11 | 3 | 54 | 32 | +22 | 59 | |
| 4 | Mezőkövesd | 30 | 13 | 9 | 8 | 53 | 37 | +16 | 48 | |
| 5 | Sopron | 30 | 12 | 12 | 6 | 46 | 38 | +8 | 48 | |

Source: mlsz.hu (in Hungarian)
Rules for classification: 1st points; 2nd overall wins; 3rd goal difference; 4th head-to-head points; 5th head-to-head goal difference; 6th head-to-head away goals scored; 7th fair-play points; 8th drawing of lots
(C) Champions; (P) Promoted

==== Results summary ====
| Overall | | | | | | | | Home | | | | | | Away | | | | | |
| Pld | W | D | L | GF | GA | GD | Pts | W | D | L | GF | GA | GD | W | D | L | GF | GA | GD |
|---|---|---|---|---|---|---|---|---|---|---|---|---|---|---|---|---|---|---|---|
| 30 | 18 | 7 | 5 | 42 | 23 | +19 | 61 | 11 | 3 | 1 | 21 | 6 | +15 | 7 | 4 | 4 | 21 | 17 | +4 |

Source: Hungarian Football Federation

==== Results by round ====
| Round | 1 | 2 | 3 | 4 | 5 | 6 | 7 | 8 | 9 | 10 | 11 | 12 | 13 | 14 | 15 | 16 | 17 | 18 | 19 | 20 | 21 | 22 | 23 | 24 | 25 | 26 | 27 | 28 | 29 | 30 |
|---|---|---|---|---|---|---|---|---|---|---|---|---|---|---|---|---|---|---|---|---|---|---|---|---|---|---|---|---|---|---|
| Ground | H | A | H | A | H | A | H | A | H | H | A | A | A | A | A | A | H | A | H | A | H | A | H | A | A | H | H | H | H | H |
| Result | W | L | W | L | L | L | W | W | W | W | W | W | W | L | W | D | D | W | W | D | W | D | D | D | W | W | W | D | W | W |
| Position | 3 | 11 | 6 | 7 | 10 | 12 | 10 | 6 | 6 | 5 | 4 | 4 | 3 | 4 | 2 | 3 | 4 | 4 | 3 | 3 | 1 | 2 | 3 | 3 | 3 | 3 | 3 | 3 | 2 | 2 |

Source: Matches
A = Away; H = Home; W = Win; D = Draw; L = Loss

==== Matches ====
| 16 August 2014 1 | Békéscsaba | 2–0 | Zalaegerszeg | Békéscsaba |
| 17:30 CEST (UTC+2) | Szilágyi 10', 49'; Bagi (yellow card) 55'; Juhász (yellow card) 79' | Report | Melczer (yellow card) 89' | Stadium: Stadion Kórház utcai Attendance: 800; Referee: József Berger |

| 22 August 2014 2 | Csákvár | 4–0 | Békéscsaba | Csákvár |
| 19:30 CEST (UTC+2) | Domján 7', (yellow card) 68'; Gajdos 29', 60'; Molnár 90' | Report | Bagi (yellow card) 35'; Balog (yellow card) 51' | Stadium: Tersztyánszky Ödön Sportközpont; Attendance: 800; Referee: Gábor Oláh |

| 30 August 2014 3 | Békéscsaba | 1–0 | Sopron | Békéscsaba |
| 17:30 CET (UTC+1) | Kertész 75'; Berki (yellow card) 76'; Mik. Balogh (yellow card) 79'; Juhász (yellow card) 86' | Report | Pintér (yellow card) 26'; Fazakas (yellow card) 29'; A. Horváth (yellow card) 63'; Eszlátyi (yellow card) 76'; Szabó (yellow card) 90+2' | Stadium: Stadion Kórház utcai Attendance: 600; Referee: Róbert Nagy |

| 5 September 2014 4 | Mezőkövesd | 4–0 | Békéscsaba | Mezőkövesd |
| 15:30 CEST (UTC+2) | Takács 4', 72', (yellow card) 77'; Kulcsár 30'; Balajti 62'; Hegedűs (yellow card) 80' | Report | Bagi (yellow card) 49'; Tölgyesi (yellow card) 81' | Stadium: Városi Stadion; Attendance: 1,100; Referee: Péter Solymosi |

| 13 September 2014 5 | Békéscsaba | 0–2 | Gyirmót | Békéscsaba |
| 16:30 CET (UTC+1) | Szilágyi (yellow card) 28' | Report | Balog (yellow card) 9'; Oross 14'; Hajba 73'; Paku (yellow card) 90' | Stadium: Stadion Kórház utcai Attendance: 500; Referee: Szabolcs Szilasi |

| 20 September 2014 6 | Vasas | 3–2 | Békéscsaba | Budapest |
| 19:00 CEST (UTC+2) | T. Nagy (yellow card) 12'; Ferenczi 14'; Grúz (yellow card) 51'; Remili 63', 75'; Rodenbücher (yellow card) 86' | Report | Tölgyesi (yellow card) 12'; Lőrinczy (yellow card) 14'; Bényei (yellow card) 15', (goal) 42'; Pataki (yellow card) 30'; Vólent 52' (pen.); Király (yellow card) 64'; Viczián (yellow card) 86'; Borbély (yellow card) 90+3' | Stadium: Stadion Rudolf Illovszky; Attendance: 1,800; Referee: Balázs Böcskei |

| 27 September 2014 7 | Békéscsaba | 4–2 | Balmazújváros | Békéscsaba |
| 16:00 CET (UTC+1) | Borbély 8' (pen.); Vólent (red card) 18'; Szilágyi 22', 52', (yellow card) 29'; Juhász (yellow card) 34'; Kertész 43'; Balog (yellow card) 51' | Report | Papp (yellow card) 31'; Angyal 56'; D. Sigér (yellow card) 68'; Reznek 90' | Stadium: Stadion Kórház utcai Attendance: 500; Referee: Ferenc Karakó |

| 4 October 2014 8 | Ajka | 0–2 | Békéscsaba | Ajka |
| 15:00 CEST (UTC+2) | Szabó (yellow card) 33'; Németh (yellow card) 66'; Kalász (yellow card) 80' | Report | Borbély (yellow card) 3'; Berki 54'; Kertész (yellow card) 77'; Balázs 78' | Stadium: Városi Stadion; Attendance: 300; Referee: Tibor Farkas |

| 12 October 2014 9 | Békéscsaba | 1–0 | Kaposvár | Békéscsaba |
| 15:00 CET (UTC+1) | Kertész 12'; Borbély (yellow card) 31' | Report | Zsdrál (yellow card) 24'; T. Kovács (yellow card) 38' | Stadium: Stadion Kórház utcai Attendance: 1,200; Referee: Zsolt Szabó |

| 18 October 2014 10 | Békéscsaba | 1–0 | Siófok | Békéscsaba |
| 14:30 CET (UTC+1) | Kertész 38' | Report | S. Papp (yellow card) 12'; Fülöp (yellow card) 70'; Kirchner (yellow card) 78'; Eisenberger (yellow card) 90+2' | Stadium: Stadion Kórház utcai Attendance: 500; Referee: Zoltán J. Kovács |

| 24 October 2014 11 | Szolnok | 1–2 | Békéscsaba | Szolnok |
| 17:00 CEST (UTC+2) | Mile (red card) 58'; Nagy 65' | Report | Borbély (yellow card) 62'; Koszó 69'; Balázs 85' | Stadium: Tiszaligeti Stadion; Attendance: 200; Referee: Gábor Oláh |

| 1 November 2014 12 | Szigetszentmiklós | 0–1 | Békéscsaba | Szigetszentmiklós |
| 13:30 CEST (UTC+2) | Kvekveskiri (yellow card) 33' | Report | Kertész 44'; Bagi (yellow card) 61'; Bényei (red card) 69'; Borbély (yellow card) 78' | Stadium: Stadium Sport Street; Attendance: 200; Referee: József Berger |

| 8 November 2014 13 | Szeged | 0–3 | Békéscsaba | Gyula |
| 13:30 CEST (UTC+2) | Zelenyánszki (yellow card) 29'; Oláh (yellow card) 42'; Belecan (yellow card) 88' | Report | Balázs 14'; Király 20'; Kertész (yellow card) 76'; Birtalan 78' | Stadium: Grosics Gyula Akadémia; Attendance: 900; Referee: János Takács |

| 15 November 2014 14 | Soroksár | 1–0 | Békéscsaba | Budapest |
| 13:00 CEST (UTC+2) | Nyilas 79' | Report | | Stadium: Sporttelep Mihály Szamosi; Attendance: 400; Referee: Péter Solymosi |

| 22 November 2014 15 | Cegléd | 0–3 | Békéscsaba | Cegléd |
| 13:00 CEST (UTC+2) | Albert (yellow card) 35'; Majoros (yellow card) 76'; Koncz (yellow card) 86' | Report | Király 9'; Szilágyi 14'; Borbély (yellow card) 33'; Bagi 78' | Stadium: Stadion Malomtó széli Attendance: 300; Referee: Béla Botló |

| 21 February 2015 16 | Zalaegerszeg | 0–0 | Békéscsaba | Zalaegerszeg |
| 14:00 CEST (UTC+2) | Forgács (yellow card) 31'; Ge. Kovács (red card) 59'; Farkas (yellow card) 90+2' | Report | Spitzmüller (yellow card) 22'; Koszó (yellow card) 55'; Bényei (yellow card) 63' | Stadium: ZTE Arena; Attendance: 1,846; Referee: Zsolt Szabó |

| 1 March 2015 17 | Békéscsaba | 0–0 | Csákvár | Gyula |
| 14:00 CET (UTC+1) | Juhász (yellow card) 28'; Birtalan (yellow card) 52'; Bényei (yellow card) 81'; Bagi (yellow card) 86' | Report | Fényes (yellow card) 50'; Domján (red card) 53'; Dulló (yellow card) 72'; C. Molnár (red card) 80'; Kocsis (yellow card) 85' | Stadium: Grosics Gyula Akadémia; Attendance: 500; Referee: Tamás Nazsa |

| 6 March 2015 18 | Sopron | 0–2 | Békéscsaba | Sopron |
| 15:30 CEST (UTC+2) | Sifter (yellow card) 75'; L. Szabó (red card) 88' | Report | Bényei (yellow card) 45'; Koszó 55'; Borbély (yellow card) 70'; Balázs 89' (pen.), (yellow card) 90+1' | Stadium: Stadion Városi; Attendance: 500; Referee: Gábor Oláh |

| 16 March 2015 19 | Békéscsaba | 2–1 | Mezőkövesd | Gyula |
| 14:30 CET (UTC+1) | Koszó (yellow card) 11'; Bényei (yellow card) 23'; Borbély (yellow card) 53'; Viczián 70', 90+4'; Kertész (yellow card) 87' | Report | Dvorschák (yellow card) 40'; C. Hegedűs (yellow card) 66'; Takács 90+1' (pen.); Bajzát (red card) 90+3' | Stadium: Grosics Gyula Akadémia; Attendance: 600; Referee: Ferenc Karakó |

| 21 March 2015 20 | Gyirmót | 2–2 | Békéscsaba | Győr |
| 18:00 CEST (UTC+2) | Madarász 28'; Bobál 84' | Report | Szilágyi 59'; Birtalan 76' | Stadium: Ménfői úti Stadion; Attendance: 1,500; Referee: Balázs Berke |

| 31 March 2015 21 | Békéscsaba | 2–1 | Vasas | Békéscsaba |
| 18:00 CET (UTC+1) | Borbély 69'; Szilágyi 74' | Report | Görgényi (yellow card) 48'; Berecz 90+3'; Hangya (yellow card) 90+4' | Stadium: Stadion Kórház utcai Attendance: 4,450; Referee: Csaba Pintér |
Note: The match was originally scheduled for 29 March 2015, but was postponed due to the renovated stadium was not yet ready for the game.

| 5 April 2015 22 | Balmazújváros | 1–1 | Békéscsaba | Balmazújváros |
| 16:30 CEST (UTC+2) | Pintér (yellow card) 14'; Papp (yellow card) 49'; Sigér (red card) 50'; Popović 60' | Report | Koszó (yellow card) 59'; Bényei (yellow card) 60'; Borbély (yellow card) 65'; Szilágyi 70' | Stadium: Városi Sportpálya; Attendance: 1,000; Referee: József Berger |

| 11 April 2015 23 | Békéscsaba | 0–0 | Ajka | Békéscsaba |
| 16:30 CET (UTC+1) | Bényei (yellow card) 56' | Report | Zsirai (yellow card) 32'; Nagy (red card) 75'; Zámbó (yellow card) 90'; Jánosa (yellow card) 90+3'; Szabó (yellow card) 90+4' | Stadium: Stadion Kórház utcai Attendance: 1,400; Referee: János Takács |

| 18 April 2015 24 | Kaposvár | 1–1 | Békéscsaba | Kaposvár |
| 19:00 CEST (UTC+2) | Lakatos (yellow card) 24', (goal) 35'; Albert (yellow card) 65'; Olasz (yellow card) 90+2' | Report | Spitzmüller (yellow card) 13'; Borbély 15'; Király (yellow card) 55' | Stadium: Rákóczi Stadion; Attendance: 500; Referee: Balázs Böcskei |

| 25 April 2015 25 | Siófok | 0–2 | Békéscsaba | Siófok |
| 17:00 CEST (UTC+2) | Mogyorósi (yellow card) 70' | Report | Borbély (yellow card) 15'; Mursits (yellow card) 31'; Berki 49'; Koszó (yellow card) 64'; Birtalan 77' | Stadium: Révész Street Stadium; Attendance: 800; Referee: Tibor II Gyarmati |

| 2 May 2015 26 | Békéscsaba | 2–0 | Szolnok | Békéscsaba |
| 19:00 CET (UTC+1) | Birtalan 11', 80' (pen.); Király (yellow card) 30'; Bényei (yellow card) 56'; Viczián (yellow card) 86' | Report | Zsdrál (yellow card) 67'; Papucsek (yellow card) 79' | Stadium: Stadion Kórház utcai Attendance: 1,000; Referee: Attila Molnár |

| 9 May 2015 27 | Békéscsaba | 1–0 | Szigetszentmiklós | Békéscsaba |
| 19:00 CET (UTC+1) | Birtalan 35' | Report | Mészáros (yellow card) 43' | Stadium: Stadion Kórház utcai Attendance: 1,200; Referee: János Takács |

| 16 May 2015 28 | Békéscsaba | 0–0 | Szeged | Békéscsaba |
| 19:00 CET (UTC+1) | Balog (yellow card) 39'; Juhász (yellow card) 53' | Report | Szántai (yellow card) 69' | Stadium: Stadion Kórház utcai Attendance: 1,000; Referee: Béla Botló |

| 23 May 2015 29 | Békéscsaba | 2–0 | Soroksár | Békéscsaba |
| 19:00 CET (UTC+1) | Bényei (yellow card) 29'; Birtalan 61', (yellow card) 61'; Szilágyi 85' | Report | Huszák (yellow card) 49'; Hodgyai (yellow card) 80' | Stadium: Stadion Kórház utcai Attendance: 1,100; Referee: Zoltán J. Kovács |

| 31 May 2015 30 | Békéscsaba | 3–0 | Cegléd | Békéscsaba |
| 19:00 CET (UTC+1) | Birtalan 28', 63'; Borbély (yellow card) 83'; Berki 86' | Report | Makrai (yellow card) 23'; Albert (yellow card) 62'; Pesti (yellow card) 75' | Stadium: Stadion Kórház utcai Attendance: 6,200; Referee: Zsolt Szabó |

=== Magyar Kupa ===
| 9 August 2014 Round of 128 | Dunaharaszti | 1–2 | Békéscsaba | Dunaharaszti |
| 17:00 CEST (UTC+2) | Kalmár (yellow card) 11'; Gacsal (yellow card) 15'; Lázár 31' | Report | Vólent 12'; Szilágyi 47'; Király (yellow card) 66'; Lőrinczy (yellow card) 74' | Stadium: DMTK Stadium; Attendance: 400; Referee: József Ducsai |

| 9 September 2014 Round of 64 | Békéscsaba | 3–1 | Siófok | Békéscsaba |
| 15:30 CEST (UTC+2) | Vólent 16'; Berki 47'; Szilágyi 90+1' | Report | Daru 88' | Stadium: Stadion Kórház utcai Attendance: 150; Referee: József Berger |

| 24 September 2014 Round of 32 | Salgótarján | 1–3 | Békéscsaba | Salgótarján |
| 15:00 CEST (UTC+2) | Horváth 80' | Report | Birtalan (yellow card) 25', (goal) 81'; Viczián 52'; Juhász (yellow card) 60'; Berki 74'; Czuczi (yellow card) 79' | Stadium: Tó-strandi Sporttelep; Attendance: 400; Referee: Ádám Radványi |

| 29 October 2014 Round of 16 | Csákvár | 2–1 | Békéscsaba | Csákvár |
| 18:00 CEST (UTC+2) | Gajdos (yellow card) 35', (goal) 58'; T. Molnár 73'; C. Molnár (yellow card) 90+2' | Report | Birtalan 45'; Bényei (yellow card) 51'; Balog (yellow card) 90' | Stadium: Tersztyánszky Ödön Sportközpont; Attendance: 200; Referee: Szabolcs Szilasi |

=== Ligakupa ===
==== Group stage ====
| Pos | Team | Pld | W | D | L | GF | GA | GD | Pts | Qualification | DEB | BÉK | KEC | SZE |
|---|---|---|---|---|---|---|---|---|---|---|---|---|---|---|
| 1 | Debrecen | 6 | 4 | 1 | 1 | 17 | 4 | +13 | 13 | Advance to knockout phase | — | 2–3 | 2–0 | 1–1 |
| 2 | Békéscsaba | 6 | 3 | 0 | 3 | 10 | 14 | −4 | 9 | Advance to knockout phase | 0–6 | — | 2–3 | 2–0 |
| 3 | Kecskemét | 6 | 2 | 1 | 3 | 6 | 9 | −3 | 7 | | 0–2 | 2–0 | — | 0–0 |
| 4 | Szeged | 6 | 1 | 2 | 3 | 5 | 11 | −6 | 5 | | 0–4 | 1–3 | 3–1 | — |

Source: Soccerway
Legend: Blue = home team win; Yellow = draw; Red = away team win.

| 2 September 2014 1 | Békéscsaba | 2–3 | Kecskemét | Békéscsaba |
| 16:30 CET (UTC+1) | Vólent 19', (yellow card) 27'; Birtalan 53'; Viczián (yellow card) 74' | Report | Gréczi 9'; Novák 22'; T. Szabó 33'; Csillag (yellow card) 89' | Stadium: Stadion Kórház utcai Attendance: 150; Referee: Tamás Nazsa |

| 16 September 2014 2 | Debrecen | 2–3 | Békéscsaba | Debrecen |
| 16:00 CEST | Mészáros 35', (yellow card) 90+3'; Szakály (yellow card) 52'; Volaš 81'; Ferenczi (red card) 88' | Report | Kertész 18'; Vólent 21', 65' | Stadium: Stadion Oláh Gábor Út; Attendance: 800; Referee: Róbert Nagy |

| 7 October 2014 3 | Békéscsaba | 2–0 | Szeged | Békéscsaba |
| 15:00 CET (UTC+1) | Balázs 21', (yellow card) 46'; Király 30' | Report | Gadó (yellow card) 43'; Faragó-Barát (yellow card) 70' | Stadium: Stadion Kórház utcai Attendance: 100; Referee: János Takács |

| 15 October 2014 4 | Szeged | 1–3 | Békéscsaba | Gyula |
| 15:00 CEST (UTC+2) | Manga 15'; Gadó (yellow card) 43'; Kéri (yellow card) 48'; Belecan (yellow card) 57'; Pászka (red card) 61'; Zelenyánszki (yellow card) 75'; P. Szabó (yellow card) 84' | Report | Birtalan 49'; Lőrinczy 58'; Szántó 75' | Stadium: Grosics Gyula Akadémia; Attendance: 200; Referee: Ferenc Karakó |

| 12 November 2014 5 | Békéscsaba | 0–6 | Debrecen | Békéscsaba |
| 13:30 CEST (UTC+2) | Mik. Balogh (yellow card) 27'; Vozár (red card) 31'; Király (yellow card) 89' | Report | Bódi (yellow card) 23'; Mihelič 27', 66' (pen.), 90' (pen.); Tisza 63', 88'; Sós 72'; Kinyik (yellow card) 73' | Stadium: Stadion Kórház utcai Attendance: 300; Referee: Balázs Berke |

| 18 November 2014 6 | Kecskemét | 2–0 | Békéscsaba | Kecskemét |
| 15:00 CEST (UTC+2) | Kitl 27'; Bebeto 76' | Report | Borbély (yellow card) 68' | Stadium: Széktói Stadion; Attendance: 200; Referee: Róbert Nagy |

==== Knockout phase ====
Round of 16

| 2 December 2014 First Leg | Békéscsaba | 2–2 | Nyíregyháza | Békéscsaba |
| 13:00 CET (UTC+1) | Szilágyi 59'; Bényei (yellow card) 63'; Balázs 84' | Report | Pekár 22'; Bajzát 28'; Abdouraman (yellow card) 70'; Nagy (yellow card) 86'; Gengeliczki (yellow card) 90+3' | Stadium: Stadion Kórház utcai Attendance: 100; Referee: Ádám Radványi |

| 9 December 2014 Second Leg | Nyíregyháza | 1–0 (3–2 agg.) | Békéscsaba | Nyíregyháza |
| 13:00 CEST (UTC+2) | Kostić 88' | Report | Juhász (yellow card) 53' | Stadium: Örökösföld Sporttelep; Attendance: 100; Referee: Róbert Nagy |
Note: Nyíregyháza won 3–2 on aggregate.

== Statistics ==
=== Overall ===
Appearances (Apps) numbers are for appearances in competitive games only, including sub appearances.
Source: Competitions

| No. | Player | Pos. | Nemzeti Bajnokság II | | | | Magyar Kupa | | | | Ligakupa | | | | Total | | | |
| No. | Player | Pos. | Apps | Goal | Booked | Sent off (straight red) | Apps | Goal | Booked | Sent off (straight red) | Apps | Goal | Booked | Sent off (straight red) | Apps | Goal | Booked | Sent off (straight red) |
|---|---|---|---|---|---|---|---|---|---|---|---|---|---|---|---|---|---|---|
| 1 | (Hungary) Márton Czuczi | GK | 1 | | | | 2 | | 1 | | 6 | | | | 9 | | 1 | |
| 3 | (Hungary) Máté Zsilinszki | MF | 1 | | | | | | | | 3 | | | | 4 | | | |
| 3 | (Hungary) Mihály Szántó | DF | | | | | | | | | 5 | 1 | | | 5 | 1 | | |
| 4 | (Hungary) Viktor Tölgyesi | MF | 10 | | 2 | | 1 | | | | 6 | | | | 17 | | 2 | |
| 5 | (Hungary) Balázs Koszó | DF | 24 | 2 | 4 | | 2 | | | | 2 | | | | 28 | 2 | 4 | |
| 5 | (Hungary) Gergely Tóth | | | | | | | | | | 1 | | | | 1 | | | |
| 6 | (Hungary) Botond Birtalan | FW | 19 | 9 | 2 | | 4 | 2 | 1 | | 7 | 2 | | | 30 | 13 | 3 | |
| 7 | (Hungary) Richárd Balázs | MF | 16 | 4 | 1 | | 2 | | | | 5 | 2 | 1 | | 23 | 6 | 2 | |
| 8 | (Hungary) István Bagi | DF | 27 | 1 | 5 | | 4 | | | | 2 | | | | 33 | 1 | 5 | |
| 8 | (Hungary) Gábor Krajcs | | | | | | | | | | 1 | | | | 1 | | | |
| 9 | (Hungary) Thomas Prasler | FW | 12 | | | | | | | | 2 | | | | 14 | | | |
| 9 | (Hungary) Erhard Lakatos | FW | | | | | | | | | 3 | | | | 3 | | | |
| 9 | (Hungary) Zoltán Konyecsni | MF | | | | | | | | | 1 | | | | 1 | | | |
| 10 | (Hungary) Attila Lőrinczy | FW | 9 | | 1 | | 3 | | 1 | | 6 | 1 | | | 18 | 1 | 2 | |
| 10 | (Hungary) István Spitzmüller | MF | 15 | | 2 | | | | | | | | | | 15 | | 2 | |
| 11 | (Hungary) Zsolt Balog | DF | 30 | | 3 | | 4 | | 1 | | | | | | 34 | | 4 | |
| 12 | (Hungary) Kristóf Koszecz | GK | | | | | | | | | 1 | | | | 1 | | | |
| 13 | (Hungary) Márkó Pilán | MF | 1 | | | | | | | | 1 | | | | 2 | | | |
| 13 | (Hungary) Zsolt Pataki | DF | 1 | | 1 | | | | | | 6 | | | | 7 | | 1 | |
| 13 | (Hungary) Milán Lászik | DF | | | | | | | | | 1 | | | | 1 | | | |
| 14 | (Hungary) Bálint Borbély | MF | 24 | 3 | 11 | | 3 | | | | 6 | | 1 | | 33 | 3 | 12 | |
| 15 | (Hungary) Dániel Zámbori | DF | | | | | | | | | 6 | | | | 6 | | | |
| 15 | (Hungary) Zsolt Fehér | DF | 10 | | | | | | | | | | | | 10 | | | |
| 15 | (Hungary) János Soós | MF | | | | | 1 | | | | | | | | 1 | | | |
| 15 | (Hungary) Máté Mezei | | | | | | | | | | | | | | | | | |
| 16 | (Hungary) Roland Vólent | FW | 14 | 1 | | 1 | 3 | 2 | | | 8 | 3 | 1 | | 25 | 6 | 1 | 1 |
| 17 | (Hungary) Tamás Kertész | FW | 19 | 5 | 3 | | 3 | | | | 4 | 1 | | | 26 | 6 | 3 | |
| 17 | (Hungary) Gábor Tóth | | | | | | | | | | 3 | | | | 3 | | | |
| 18 | (Hungary) Patrik Király | MF | 27 | 2 | 3 | | 1 | | 1 | | 4 | 1 | 1 | | 32 | 3 | 5 | |
| 19 | (Hungary) Miklós Balogh | DF | 4 | | 1 | | 2 | | | | 7 | | 1 | | 13 | | 2 | |
| 20 | (Hungary) Péter Szilágyi | FW | 30 | 9 | 2 | | 4 | 2 | | | 2 | 1 | | | 36 | 12 | 2 | |
| 21 | (Hungary) György Juhász | DF | 25 | | 5 | | 4 | | 1 | | 2 | | 1 | | 31 | | 7 | |
| 22 | (Hungary) Ádám Viczián | DF | 17 | 2 | 2 | | 2 | 1 | | | 3 | | 1 | | 22 | 3 | 3 | |
| 23 | (Hungary) Balázs Bényei | DF | 26 | 1 | 9 | 1 | 3 | | 1 | | 3 | | 1 | | 32 | 1 | 11 | 1 |
| 23 | (Hungary) Attila Solymosi | | | | | | | | | | 2 | | | | 2 | | | |
| 24 | (Hungary) Péter Berki | FW | 21 | 3 | 1 | | 4 | 2 | | | 1 | | | | 26 | 5 | 1 | |
| 25 | (Hungary) Dávid Vozár | DF | | | | | 1 | | | | 4 | | | 1 | 5 | | | 1 |
| 25 | (Hungary) Milán Balogh | MF | 7 | | | | 1 | | | | 6 | | | | 14 | | | |
| 32 | (Hungary) Roland Mursits | GK | 13 | | 1 | | | | | | | | | | 13 | | 1 | |
| 90 | (Hungary) Dániel Póser | GK | 17 | | | | 2 | | | | 2 | | | | 21 | | | |
| Own goals | | | | | | | | | | | | | | | | | | |
| Totals | | | | 42 | 59 | 2 | | 9 | 7 | | | 12 | 8 | 1 | | 63 | 74 | 3 |

=== Clean sheets ===
| | | | Clean sheets | | | |
| No. | Player | Games Played | Nemzeti Bajnokság II | Magyar Kupa | Ligakupa | Total |
|---|---|---|---|---|---|---|
| 90 | (Hungary) Dániel Póser | 21 | 10 | 0 | 0 | 10 |
| 32 | (Hungary) Roland Mursits | 13 | 9 | | | 9 |
| 1 | (Hungary) Márton Czuczi | 9 | 0 | 0 | 1 | 1 |
| 12 | (Hungary) Kristóf Koszecz | 1 | | | 1 | 1 |
| Totals | | | 19 | 0 | 2 | 21 |
