= 2015–16 Vasas FC season =

Vasas
2015–16 season
- Chief executive: Miklós Vancsa
- Manager: Károly Szanyó (until 19 October); Antal Simon (from 19 October to 31 December); Michael Oenning (from 1 January)
- Stadium: Illovszky Rudolf Stadion
- Nemzeti Bajnokság I: 10th
- Magyar Kupa: Round of 32
- Top goalscorer: League: Mohamed Remili (6); All: Mohamed Remili (10)
- Highest home attendance: 4,500 v Újpest (25 July 2015, Nemzeti Bajnokság I)
- Lowest home attendance: 950 v Puskás Akadémia (28 November 2015, Nemzeti Bajnokság I)
- Average home league attendance: 2,121
- Biggest win: 12–0 v Hidasnémeti (Away, 12 August 2015, Magyar Kupa)
- Biggest defeat: 1–5 v Ferencváros (Away, 31 October 2015, Nemzeti Bajnokság I); 0–4 v Debrecen (Away, 13 February 2016, Nemzeti Bajnokság I)

The 2015–16 season was Vasas Football Club's 85th competitive season, 104th year in existence as a football club and first season in the Nemzeti Bajnokság I after winning the second division in the previous season. In addition to the domestic league, Vasas participated in that season's editions of the Magyar Kupa.

Besides Vasas, MTK played their home games in the Illovszky Rudolf Stadion due to the Hidegkuti Nándor Stadion in Budapest, built in 1947, being demolished to make way to the newly built Hidegkuti Nándor Stadion. During the season, MTK changed their temporary stadion to Dunaújváros due to the condition of the pitch deteriorating because of the unusual weather conditions and high loads.

On 19 October 2015, Károly Szanyó, who earned promotion, was sacked for the team being in a relegation spot and replaced by Antal Simon. His mandate expired on 31 December 2015, and Simon was replaced by German Michael Oenning on the first day of the new year.

In the last round, they were battling with Puskás Akadémia to avoid relegation, and they eventually came out on top after beating MTK 2–0.

== Squad ==
Squad at end of season

Note: Flags indicate national team as defined under FIFA eligibility rules; some limited exceptions apply. Players may hold more than one non-FIFA nationality.

No.	Pos.	Nation	Player
1	GK	HUN	Gergely Nagy
2	DF	HUN	Attila Osváth
4	DF	MKD	Kire Ristevski
6	DF	HUN	Tamás Grúz
6	MF	HUN	Donát Szivacski
7	DF	HUN	Szilveszter Hangya
8	FW	HUN	Martin Ádám
9	FW	GRE	Ilias Ignatidis
10	FW	HUN	Mohamed Remili
12	MF	SRB	Miloš Adamović
13	MF	HUN	Zsombor Berecz

No.	Pos.	Nation	Player
14	DF	HUN	Csaba Preklet
15	FW	HUN	Norbert Könyves
16	FW	UKR	Yevhen Pavlov
21	DF	HUN	Zsolt Korcsmár
23	MF	HUN	Máté Vida
31	GK	HUN	Bence Hermány
37	MF	GER	Christian Müller
77	MF	HUN	Péter Czvitkovics
89	DF	HUN	András Debreceni
90	GK	HUN	Dániel Póser
99	FW	HUN	Csanád Novák

== Transfers ==
=== Transfers in ===
Transfer window	Pos.	No.	Player	From
Summer	DF	—	(Hungary) Máté Czingráber	Haladás
Summer	GK	1	(Hungary) Gergely Nagy	Dunaújváros
Summer	DF	2	(Hungary) Attila Osváth	Szigetszentmiklós
Summer	MF	5	(Montenegro) Marko Vukasović	Free agent (Note: Previous club Kecskemét.)
Summer	MF	6	(Hungary) Donát Szivacski	Kecskemét
Summer	DF	7	(Hungary) Szilveszter Hangya	MTK
Summer	MF	12	(Serbia) Miloš Adamović	(Serbia) Mladost Lučani
Summer	FW	15	(Hungary) Norbert Könyves	Paks
Summer	FW	16	(Ukraine) Yevhen Pavlov	(Serbia) Mladost Lučani
Summer	DF	21	(Hungary) Gábor Bori	Diósgyőr
Summer	FW	22	(Serbia) Vojo Ubiparip	Free agent (Note: Previous club Lech Poznań.)
Summer	MF	29	(Hungary) Benedek Murka	Youth team
Summer	DF	33	(Serbia) Tomislav Pajović	(Israel) Hapoel Be'er Sheva
Summer	GK	90	(Hungary) Dániel Póser	Free agent (Note: Previous club Békéscsaba.)
Summer	DF	93	(Croatia) Danijel Romić	Free agent (Note: Previous club Pécs.)
Summer	FW	99	(Hungary) Csanád Novák	Kecskemét
Winter	DF	4	(North Macedonia) Kire Ristevski	(North Macedonia) Rabotnički
Winter	FW	9	(Greece) Ilias Ignatidis	(Greece) Kallithea
Winter	DF	21	(Hungary) Zsolt Korcsmár	(Greece) Greuther Fürth
Winter	MF	37	(Germany) Christian Müller	(Germany) Arminia Bielefeld

=== Transfers out ===
Transfer window	Pos.	No.	Player	To
Summer	MF	16	(Hungary) Dániel Nagy	Released (Note: Joined Siófok.)
Summer	DF	17	(Hungary) Dávid Görgényi	Vác
Summer	DF	18	(Hungary) Dávid Pál	Zalaegerszeg
Summer	DF	21	(Hungary) Gábor Bori	Gyirmót
Summer	DF	21	(Hungary) Gábor Polényi	Mezőkövesd
Summer	MF	24	(Hungary) Tamás Nagy	Budaörs
Summer	MF	27	(Hungary) Attila Menyhárt	Budaörs
Summer	MF	28	(Hungary) Krisztofer Takács	Released (Note: Joined MTK.)
Summer	FW	29	(Hungary) László Oláh	Released (Note: Joined Békéscsaba.)
Summer	GK	33	(Hungary) Gábor Németh	Retired
Winter	MF	5	(Montenegro) Marko Vukasović	Released (Note: Joined Chikhura.)
Winter	MF	19	(Hungary) János Lázok	Released (Note: Joined Újpest.)
Winter	FW	20	(Hungary) Krisztián Kenesei	Released (Note: Joined III. Kerület.)
Winter	FW	22	(Serbia) Vojo Ubiparip	(Serbia) Novi Pazar
Winter	DF	33	(Serbia) Tomislav Pajović	Released (Note: Joined Budućnost Podgorica.)

=== Loans in ===
Transfer window	Pos.	No.	Player	From	End date

=== Loans out ===
Transfer window	Pos.	No.	Player	To	End date
Summer	DF	—	(Hungary) Máté Czingráber	Siófok	End of season
Summer	MF	—	(Hungary) Richárd Nagy	Siófok	End of season
Summer	N/A	—	(Hungary) Norbert Rabatin	Pénzügyőr	End of season
Summer	GK	1	(Hungary) Soma Lékai	Pénzügyőr	Middle of season
Summer	DF	3	(Hungary) László Tamás	Siófok	End of season
Summer	MF	6	(Hungary) Donát Szivacski	Siófok	Middle of season
Summer	MF	15	(Hungary) Mátyás Gál	Siófok	End of season
Summer	MF	29	(Hungary) Benedek Murka	Siófok	End of season

== Competitions ==
=== Overview ===
Competition	First match	Last match	Starting round	Final position	Record							
Competition	First match	Last match	Starting round	Final position	Pld	W	D	L	GF	GA	GD	Win %
Nemzeti Bajnokság I	18 July 2015	30 April 2016	Matchday 1	10th	33	9	5	19	32	54	−22	27.27
Magyar Kupa	12 August 2015	21 October 2015	Round of 128	Round of 32	3	2	1	0	15	2	+13	66.67
Total					36	11	6	19	47	56	−9	30.56

Source: Competitions

=== Nemzeti Bajnokság I ===
==== League table ====
Pos	Team	Pld	W	D	L	GF	GA	GD	Pts	Qualification or relegation
8	Honvéd	33	12	7	14	40	39	+1	43	
9	Diósgyőr	33	10	8	15	37	47	−10	38	
10	Vasas	33	9	5	19	32	54	−22	32	
11	Puskás Akadémia (R)	33	7	10	16	35	51	−16	31	Relegation to the Nemzeti Bajnokság II
12	Békéscsaba (R)	33	6	9	18	25	55	−30	27	Relegation to the Nemzeti Bajnokság II

Source: Soccerway
Rules for classification: 1) Points; 2) Matches won; 3) Goal difference; 4) Goals scored; 5) Head-to-head points; 6) Head-to-head goal difference; 7) Head-to-head away goals scored; 8) Fairplay; 9) Draw.
(R) Relegated

==== Results summary ====
Overall								Home						Away					
Pld	W	D	L	GF	GA	GD	Pts	W	D	L	GF	GA	GD	W	D	L	GF	GA	GD
33	9	5	19	32	54	−22	32	6	1	9	19	25	−6	3	4	10	13	29	−16

Source: Hungarian Football Federation

==== Results by round ====
Round	1	2	3	4	5	6	7	8	9	10	11	12	13	14	15	16	17	18	19	20	21	22	23	24	25	26	27	28	29	30	31	32	33
Ground	A	H	H	A	H	A	H	A	H	A	H	H	A	A	H	A	H	A	H	A	H	A	A	H	A	H	A	H	A	H	A	H	A
Result	L	L	L	W	W	L	L	W	L	D	L	L	L	L	W	L	L	L	W	L	W	L	D	D	L	L	D	W	L	L	D	W	W
Position	9	11	11	9	8	9	10	9	11	10	11	11	11	11	10	10	11	11	10	11	10	10	10	11	11	11	11	10	10	10	11	10	10
Points	0	0	0	3	6	6	6	9	9	10	10	10	10	10	13	13	13	13	16	16	19	19	20	21	21	21	22	25	25	25	26	29	32

Source: Matches
A = Away; H = Home; W = Win; D = Draw; L = Loss

==== Matches ====
18 July 2015 1	Diósgyőr	2–1	Vasas	Miskolc
18:00 CEST (UTC+2)	Kovács (yellow card) 19'; Grumić 28'; Grúz 36' (o.g.); Nikházi (yellow card) 45'; Egerszegi (yellow card) 72'; Takács (yellow card) 79'	Report	Lázok 14'; Osváth (yellow card) 45'; Berecz (yellow card) 55'	Stadium: Diósgyőri Stadion; Attendance: 4,351; Referee: Péter Solymosi

25 July 2015 2	Vasas	1–3	Újpest	Budapest
20:30 CEST (UTC+2)	Remili 41'; Grúz (yellow card) 63'; Pajović (red card) 76'; Hangya (yellow card) 90+1'	Report	Mohl 30'; Heris (yellow card) 33'; Sallói 52'; Sanković 59', (yellow card) 80'	Stadium: Illovszky Rudolf Stadion; Attendance: 4,500; Referee: István Vad

1 August 2015 3	Vasas	0–2	Ferencváros	Budapest
20:30 CEST (UTC+2)	Hangya (yellow card) 38'; Lázok (yellow card) 42'; Remili (yellow card) 70'	Report	Somália (yellow card) 7'; Böde 48', 59'; Dilaver (yellow card) 90+2'	Stadium: Illovszky Rudolf Stadion; Attendance: 3,000; Referee: Viktor Kassai

8 August 2015 4	Békéscsaba	0–2	Vasas	Békéscsaba
18:00 CEST (UTC+2)	Spitzmüller (yellow card) 45'; Piermayr (yellow card) 67'; Calvente (yellow card) 71'; Borbély (red card) 87'	Report	Debreceni (yellow card) 12'; Lázok (yellow card) 18'; Remili 52'; Novák 57'; Berecz (yellow card) 68'	Stadium: Kórház utcai Stadion; Attendance: 2,914; Referee: Zsolt Szabó

15 August 2015 5	Vasas	2–1	Videoton	Budapest
18:00 CEST (UTC+2)	Pajović (yellow card) 17'; Novák 48'; Remili 76'	Report	Heffler (yellow card) 28'; Ivanovski (yellow card) 42'; Kovács 45+2', (yellow card) 49'	Stadium: Illovszky Rudolf Stadion; Attendance: 2,500; Referee: Péter Solymosi

22 August 2015 6	Puskás Akadémia	1–0	Vasas	Felcsút
18:00 CEST (UTC+2)	Fodor (yellow card) 32'; Pauljević (yellow card) 82'; Pekár 85'	Report	Lázok (yellow card) 51'; Adamović (yellow card) 65'; Remili (yellow card) 90'	Stadium: Pancho Aréna; Attendance: 2,081; Referee: Tamás Bognár

29 August 2015 7	Vasas	0–1	MTK	Budapest
18:00 CEST (UTC+2)		Report	Vass (yellow card) 64'; Vadnai (yellow card) 66'; Hegedűs (yellow card) 84'; Szatmári 85'	Stadium: Stadion Rudolf Illovszky; Attendance: 2,000; Referee: Ádám Németh

12 September 2015 8	Honvéd	0–1	Vasas	Budapest
18:00 CEST (UTC+2)	Lovrić (yellow card) 24'; Délczeg (yellow card) 68'; Baráth (yellow card) 90'	Report	Hangya (yellow card) 8'; Novák (yellow card) 13'; Osváth 18'; Adamović (yellow card) 33'; Pajović (yellow card) 60'	Stadium: Bozsik József Stadion; Attendance: 2,530; Referee: Sándor Andó-Szabó

19 September 2015 9	Vasas	0–1	Debrecen	Budapest
18:00 CEST (UTC+2)	Vukasović (yellow card) 20'; Adamović (yellow card) 40'; Pajović (yellow card) 72'; Ádám (yellow card) 87'	Report	Ferenczi (yellow card) 41'; Castillion (yellow card) 72'; Kulcsár 77'	Stadium: Illovszky Rudolf Stadion; Attendance: 2,850; Referee: Csaba Pintér

26 September 2015 10	Haladás	1–1	Vasas	Szombathely
18:00 CEST (UTC+2)	Gaál 52'; P. Nagy (yellow card) 57'; Popin (yellow card) 79'; Király (yellow card) 83'	Report	Ubiparip (yellow card) 49'; Berecz (yellow card) 54'; Grúz (yellow card) 61'; Kenesei 88'	Stadium: Rohonci út Attendance: 4,085; Referee: Péter Solymosi

3 October 2015 11	Vasas	1–2	Paks	Budapest
18:00 CEST (UTC+2)	Remili 60'; Osváth (yellow card) 67'; Pavlov (yellow card) 85'; Grúz (yellow card) 90+3'	Report	Koltai 23'; Rodenbücher (yellow card) 40'; Bartha 42'; Papp (yellow card) 90+1'	Stadium: Illovszky Rudolf Stadion; Attendance: 1,500; Referee: Tamás Bognár

17 October 2015 12	Vasas	0–1	Diósgyőr	Budapest
18:00 CEST (UTC+2)	Könyves (yellow card) 36'; Remili (yellow card) 90+1'	Report	Tamás (yellow card) 68'; Bacsa 70'; Lipták (yellow card) 80'; Okuka (yellow card) 81'; James (yellow card) 88'	Stadium: Illovszky Rudolf Stadion; Attendance: 1,800; Referee: Ferenc Karakó

24 October 2015 13	Újpest	2–0	Vasas	Budapest
17:30 CEST (UTC+2)	Diagne 80', 85'; Forró (yellow card) 84'	Report	Könyves (yellow card) 4'; Remili (yellow card) 53'; Debreceni (yellow card) 79'	Stadium: Szusza Ferenc Stadion; Attendance: 1,834; Referee: József Erdős

31 October 2015 14	Ferencváros	5–1	Vasas	Budapest
18:00 CET (UTC+1)	Šesták 2', (yellow card) 60'; Varga 23', 63'; Leandro 26'; Ramírez 81'	Report	Adamović (yellow card) 43'; Ubiparip 46'; Grúz (yellow card) 60'; Preklet (yellow card) 62'; Debreceni (yellow card) 69'; Ádám (yellow card) 80'	Stadium: Groupama Arena; Attendance: 6,873; Referee: Ádám Farkas

21 November 2015 16	Videoton	2–0	Vasas	Székesfehérvár
15:30 CET (UTC+1)	Kovács 10'; Gyurcsó 33'; Pátkai (yellow card) 63'	Report	Adamović (yellow card) 31'; Vukasović (yellow card) 74'	Stadium: Sóstói Stadion; Attendance: 1,616; Referee: Csaba Pintér

28 November 2015 17	Vasas	2–4	Puskás Akadémia	Budapest
15:30 CET (UTC+1)	Ádám 23', (yellow card) 44'; Vukasović (yellow card) 39'; Debreceni (yellow card) 53'; Preklet (yellow card) 56'; Remili (red card) 73'; Czvitkovics 74'	Report	Pekár (yellow card) 19'; Debreceni 34' (o.g.); Bačelić-Grgić 36'; Tischler 40', 85'	Stadium: Illovszky Rudolf Stadion; Attendance: 950; Referee: István Vad

2 December 2015 15	Vasas	4–0	Békéscsaba	Budapest
18:30 CET (UTC+1)	Pajović (yellow card) 20'; Könyves 41', 51'; Ádám (yellow card) 53'; Debreceni (yellow card) 58'; Pavlov 64'; Preklet (yellow card) 81'; Kenesei 84' (pen.)	Report	Bényei (yellow card) 66'; Laczkó (yellow card) 80'	Stadium: Illovszky Rudolf Stadion; Attendance: 1,150; Referee: Ádám Farkas
Note: The matches of the 15th round were originally scheduled for 7 November 2015, but was postponed due to HFF decision.

5 December 2015 18	MTK	2–1	Vasas	Budapest
15:30 CET (UTC+1)	Torghelle 6', 53'; Thiam (yellow card) 76'; Vadnai (yellow card) 90+1'	Report	Pavlov 22'; Adamović (yellow card) 74'; Romić (yellow card) 75'; Kenesei (yellow card) 89'	Stadium: Illovszky Rudolf Stadion; Attendance: 714; Referee: Viktor Kassai

12 December 2015 19	Vasas	2–1	Honvéd	Budapest
15:30 CET (UTC+1)	Pajović (yellow card) 33'; Kenesei 75' (pen.); Ádám (yellow card) 77'; Debreceni 79'	Report	Botka (yellow card) 31'; Kamber 42'	Stadium: Illovszky Rudolf Stadion; Attendance: 1,000; Referee: Ádám Németh

13 February 2016 20	Debrecen	4–0	Vasas	Debrecen
15:30 CET (UTC+1)	Bódi 5'; Horváth 26'; Holman 35'; Sidibe 49'	Report	Debreceni (yellow card) 73'	Stadium: Nagyerdei Stadion; Attendance: 2,124; Referee: József Erdős

20 February 2016 21	Vasas	1–0	Haladás	Budapest
15:30 CET (UTC+1)	Vida (yellow card) 37'; Preklet (yellow card) 67'; Pavlov (yellow card) 79'; Ferenczi 82'	Report	Williams (yellow card) 47'; Jagodics (red card) 53'; Wils (yellow card) 81'; Halmosi (yellow card) 85'	Stadium: Illovszky Rudolf Stadion; Attendance: 2,032; Referee: Ádám Németh

27 February 2016 22	Paks	3–0	Vasas	Paks
15:30 CET (UTC+1)	Lenzsér (yellow card) 41', (goal) 45'; Kulcsár (yellow card) 50', (goal) 76'; Bartha 58'; Hahn (yellow card) 72'	Report	Adamović (yellow card) 29'; Vida (yellow card) 32'	Stadium: Fehérvári úti Stadion; Attendance: 1,136; Referee: Sándor Andó-Szabó

5 March 2016 23	Honvéd	0–0	Vasas	Budapest
18:00 CET (UTC+1)	Botka (yellow card) 40'; Vasiljević (yellow card) 50'; Eppel (red card) 59'; Gazdag (red card) 70'	Report	Ristevski (yellow card) 33'; Vida (yellow card) 52'; Könyves (yellow card) 90'	Stadium: Bozsik József Stadion; Attendance: 1,659; Referee: Ferenc Karakó

8 March 2016 24	Vasas	0–0	Debrecen	Budapest
18:00 CET (UTC+1)	Novák (yellow card) 7'; Hangya (yellow card) 83'; Ristevski (yellow card) 86'	Report	Takács (red card) 59'	Stadium: Illovszky Rudolf Stadion; Attendance: 1,100; Referee: Ádám Németh

12 March 2016 25	Paks	2–0	Vasas	Paks
15:30 CET (UTC+1)	Bartha (yellow card) 17'; Papp (yellow card) 31'; Bertus 33'; Szakály (yellow card) 35'; Bajner (yellow card) 57'; Hahn 79'	Report	Ristevski (yellow card) 24'; Novák (yellow card) 55'; Hangya (yellow card) 83'; Ferenczi (yellow card) 87'; Vida (yellow card) 90+2'	Stadium: Fehérvári úti Stadion; Attendance: 1,072; Referee: Ádám Farkas

19 March 2016 26	Vasas	1–4	Ferencváros	Budapest
18:00 CET (UTC+1)	Pavlov 22', (yellow card) 67'; Remili (yellow card) 44'; G. Nagy (yellow card) 75'	Report	Šesták 11', 19'; Böde 65', 76'	Stadium: Illovszky Rudolf Stadion; Attendance: 3,452; Referee: Viktor Kassai

2 April 2016 28	Vasas	3–2	Újpest	Budapest
20:45 CEST (UTC+2)	Ádám 13'; Grúz (yellow card) 36'; Könyves 73'; Müller (yellow card) 79'; Hangya 90'	Report	Andrić 20', (yellow card) 79'; Heris (yellow card) 58'; Bardhi 78'	Stadium: Illovszky Rudolf Stadion; Attendance: 1,200; Referee: Ferenc Karakó

6 April 2016 29	Haladás	2–1	Vasas	Sopron (Note: The match was played at the Káposztás utcai Stadion in Sopron, instead of Haladás regular stadium, the Rohonci út in Szombathely, which was demolished to make way to the newly built Haladás Sportkomplexum.)
19:00 CEST (UTC+2)	Németh 56'; Gaál 63'	Report	Müller 37', (yellow card) 69'; Pavlov (red card) 90+5'	Stadium: Káposztás utcai Stadion; Attendance: 1,117; Referee: Péter Solymosi

9 April 2016 27	Videoton	2–2	Vasas	Felcsút (Note: The match was played at the Pancho Aréna in Felcsút, instead of Videoton regular stadium, the Sóstói Stadion in Székesfehérvár, built in 1967 which was demolished to make way to the newly built Sóstói Stadion.)
18:00 CEST (UTC+2)	Pátkai (yellow card) 33'; Juhász (yellow card) 63'; Suljić (yellow card) 73'; Géresi 74'; Négo 78', (yellow card) 90+4'	Report	Remili 14', 18', (yellow card) 73'; Hangya (yellow card) 17'; Novák (yellow card) 71'	Stadium: Pancho Aréna; Attendance: 1,287; Referee: Ádám Farkas

16 April 2016 30	Vasas	1–3	Diósgyőr	Budapest
18:00 CEST (UTC+2)	Ferenczi 80'	Report	Egerszegi 19', 63'; Tamás (red card) 38'; Elek 48'	Stadium: Illovszky Rudolf Stadion; Attendance: 1,552; Referee: József Erdős

19 April 2016 31	Békéscsaba	1–1	Vasas	Békéscsaba
20:00 CEST (UTC+2)	Bényei (yellow card) 18'; Vaskó (yellow card) 57', (goal) 74'; Punoševac (yellow card) 59'; Piermayr (yellow card) 72'; Takács (yellow card) 77'	Report	Novák (yellow card) 7'; Szivacski (yellow card) 28'; Laczkó 50' (o.g.); Ádám (yellow card) 79'; Ristevski (yellow card) 81'; Adamović (yellow card) 90+3'	Stadium: Kórház utcai Stadion; Attendance: 3,754; Referee: Ferenc Karakó

23 April 2016 32	Vasas	1–0	Puskás Akadémia	Budapest
18:00 CEST (UTC+2)	Korcsmár 6'; Szivacski (yellow card) 23'; Remili (yellow card) 24'	Report	Pekár (yellow card) 25'; Polonkai (yellow card) 90+2'	Stadium: Illovszky Rudolf Stadion; Attendance: 3,350; Referee: Ádám Farkas

30 April 2016 33	MTK	0–2	Vasas	Dunaújváros
16:30 CEST (UTC+2)	Grgić (yellow card) 45'; Gera (yellow card) 78'	Report	Vida 66'; Ristevski (yellow card) 80'; Pavlov 90+1'	Stadium: Dunaújvárosi Stadion; Attendance: 1,003; Referee: István Vad

=== Magyar Kupa ===
12 August 2015 Round of 128	Hidasnémeti	0–12	Vasas	Hidasnémeti
17:00 CEST (UTC+2)	Eperjesi (yellow card) 47'	Report	Kenesei 7', 48', 69'; Czvitkovics 9', 59', 84'; Lázok 37'; Gál 42'; Remili 46', 62', 87'; Berecz 76'	Stadium: Hidasnémeti Sportcentrum; Referee: Csaba Sándor

22 September 2015 Round of 64	Szolnok	1–2	Vasas	Szolnok
18:00 CEST (UTC+2)	Gajdos 26'; Kovács (yellow card) 90+2'; Pokorni (red card) 90+2'	Report	Czvitkovics 34'; Vukasović (yellow card) 36'; Papucsek 53' (o.g.); Pavlov (yellow card) 64'; Hangya (yellow card) 88'; Osváth (yellow card) 90'	Stadium: Tiszaligeti Stadion; Attendance: 800; Referee: Róbert Nagy

21 October 2015 Round of 32	Nyíregyháza	1–1 (a.e.t.) (5–3 p)	Vasas	Nyíregyháza
18:00 CEST (UTC+2)	Rezes 17', (yellow card) 90+2'; Kostić (yellow card) 43'; Szokol (yellow card) 60'; Törtei (yellow card) 120'	Report	Preklet (yellow card) 21'; Adamović (yellow card) 34'; Remili (yellow card) 37', (goal) 56'; Hangya (yellow card) 117'	Stadium: Városi Stadion; Attendance: 2,300; Referee: Zoltán Iványi
	Penalties
	Kostić (penalty scored); Žofčák (penalty scored); Rubus (penalty scored); Kapacina (penalty scored); Törtei (penalty scored)		(penalty scored) Debreceni; (penalty scored) Vida; (penalty missed) Berecz; (penalty scored) Adamović

== Statistics ==
=== Overall ===
Appearances (Apps) numbers are for appearances in competitive games only, including sub appearances.
Source: Competitions

No.	Player	Pos.	Nemzeti Bajnokság I				Magyar Kupa				Total			
No.	Player	Pos.	Apps	Goal	Booked	Sent off (straight red)	Apps	Goal	Booked	Sent off (straight red)	Apps	Goal	Booked	Sent off (straight red)
1	(Hungary) Gergely Nagy	GK	23		1						23		1	
2	(Hungary) Attila Osváth	DF	11	1	2		1		1		12	1	3	
3	(Hungary) Roland Pataki	FW					1				1			
4	(North Macedonia) Kire Ristevski	DF	12		5						12		5	
4	(Hungary) Olivér Tóth	DF												
5	(Montenegro) Marko Vukasović	MF	15		3		2		1		17		4	
6	(Hungary) Tamás Grúz	DF	17		5		1				18		5	
6	(Hungary) Donát Szivacski	MF	8		2						8		2	
7	(Hungary) Szilveszter Hangya	DF	26	1	6		2		2		28	1	8	
8	(Hungary) Martin Ádám	FW	21	2	6		2				23	2	6	
9	(Greece) Ilias Ignatidis	FW	3								3			
10	(Hungary) Mohamed Remili	FW	27	6	7	1	2	4	1		29	10	8	1
12	(Serbia) Miloš Adamović	MF	16		8		2		1		18		9	
13	(Hungary) Zsombor Berecz	MF	29		3		3	1			32	1	3	
14	(Hungary) Csaba Preklet	DF	14		4		2		1		16		5	
15	(Hungary) Mátyás Gál	MF	1				1	1			2	1		
15	(Hungary) Norbert Könyves	FW	19	3	3		1				20	3	3	
16	(Ukraine) Yevhen Pavlov	FW	21	4	3	1	2		1		23	4	4	1
17	(Hungary) Dávid Görgényi	DF	1				1				2			
19	(Hungary) János Lázok	MF	13	1	3		3	1			16	2	3	
20	(Hungary) Krisztián Kenesei	FW	9	3	1		2	3			11	6	1	
21	(Hungary) Gábor Bori	DF	2								2			
21	(Hungary) Zsolt Korcsmár	DF	14	1							14	1		
22	(Serbia) Vojo Ubiparip	FW	9	1	1		1				10	1	1	
23	(Hungary) Máté Vida	MF	31	1	4		1				32	1	4	
28	(Hungary) Márk Kleisz	MF												
29	(Hungary) Benedek Murka	MF	2								2			
31	(Hungary) Bence Hermány	GK	11				3				14			
33	(Serbia) Tomislav Pajović	DF	17		5	1	2				19		5	1
37	(Germany) Christian Müller	MF	12	1	2						12	1	2	
39	(Hungary) István Ferenczi	FW	5	2	1						5	2	1	
77	(Hungary) Péter Czvitkovics	MF	14	1			3	4			17	5		
89	(Hungary) András Debreceni	DF	26	1	6		3				29	1	6	
90	(Hungary) Dániel Póser	GK												
93	(Croatia) Danijel Romić	DF	4		1						4		1	
99	(Hungary) Csanád Novák	FW	23	2	5		1				24	2	5	
Own goals				1				1				2		
Totals				32	87	3		15	8			47	95	3

=== Hat-tricks ===
No.	Player	Against	Result	Date	Competition
20	(Hungary) Krisztián Kenesei	Hidasnémeti (A)	12–0	12 August 2015	Magyar Kupa
77	(Hungary) Péter Czvitkovics	Hidasnémeti (A)	12–0	12 August 2015	Magyar Kupa
10	(Hungary) Mohamed Remili	Hidasnémeti (A)	12–0	12 August 2015	Magyar Kupa

=== Clean sheets ===
			Clean sheets		
No.	Player	Games Played	Nemzeti Bajnokság I	Magyar Kupa	Total
1	(Hungary) Gergely Nagy	23	5		5
31	(Hungary) Bence Hermány	14	3	1	4
90	(Hungary) Dániel Póser	0			0
Totals			8	1	9
