= Arbey Mosquera =

Colombian footballer (born 1988)

Personal information
- Full name: Arbey Mosquera Mina
- Date of birth: 20 January 1988 (age 38)
- Place of birth: Buenaventura, Colombia
- Height: 1.85 m (6 ft 1 in)
- Position: Centre-forward

Senior career*
Years	Team	Apps	(Gls)
2009–2011	Cortuluá	5	(1)
2011–2012	Atlético Bucaramanga	29	(4)
2012–2013	Yaracuyanos	13	(1)
2013–2014	Békéscsaba	39	(10)
2015–2016	Tucanes	25	(6)
2016–2017	Puerto Cabello		
2017–2018	Ureña	11	(2)
2018–2019	La Equidad	20	(3)
2019–2020	Naft Al-Wasat	0	(0)
2020	AD Isidro Metapán	0	(0)
- * Club domestic league appearances and goals as of January 27, 2019

Arbey Mosquera Mina (born 20 January 1988 in Buenaventura), is a Colombian professional footballer who currently plays for Naft Al-Wasat in Iraqi Premier League.

== Honours ==
Cortuluá

- Categoría Primera B: 2009
