= Calvin Tolmbaye =

Central African Republic footballer

Personal information
- Full name: Ali Calvin Tolmbaye
- Date of birth: 10 May 1986 (age 40)
- Place of birth: Arad, Romania
- Height: 1.85 m (6 ft 1 in)
- Position: Central defender

Team information
- Current team: Șoimii Șimand

Youth career
- AS Romvest Arad
- CS Atletico Arad

Senior career*
Years	Team	Apps	(Gls)
2005–2006	Gloria Arad		
2006–2007	Râmnicu Vâlcea	4	(0)
2007	Internațional		
2008	Arieșul Turda	8	(0)
2008–2009	Unirea Sânnicolau Mare		
2010	Gloria Arad		
2010–2012	UTA Arad	41	(2)
2013–2014	Békéscsaba	30	(0)
2014–2016	Mioveni	55	(3)
2016	Gloria LT Cermei	11	(0)
2017–2019	Șoimii Lipova	49	(3)
2019–2020	Crișul Chișineu-Criș	15	(0)
2020–2023	Frontiera Curtici	23	(0)
2023–2024	Unirea Sântana		
2025–	Șoimii Șimand		

International career^{‡}
2013–2015	Central African Republic	6	(0)
- * Club domestic league appearances and goals as of 22:23, 6 January 2025 (UTC) ‡ National team caps and goals as of 6 October 2015

Calvin Tolmbaye (born May 10, 1986) is a footballer who plays as a central defender for Șoimii Șimand in the Liga IV. Born in Romania, he represented the Central African Republic internationally, making six appearances. He was called up to the national team for the first time in 2013 ahead of World Cup qualification matches against South Africa and Botswana.
