= Botond Birtalan =

Hungarian football forward player

Personal information
- Full name: Botond Birtalan
- Date of birth: 8 April 1989 (age 37)
- Place of birth: Budapest, Hungary
- Height: 1.83 m (6 ft 0 in)
- Position: Forward

Team information
- Current team: III. Kerület (on loan from Vasas)

Youth career
- 1997–1998: BVSC
- 1998–1999: Vasas
- 1999–2003: Ferencváros
- 2003–2006: Vasas

Senior career*
Years	Team	Apps	(Gls)
2006–2008	Sopron	14	(1)
2008–2009	Liberty Salonta	24	(5)
2009–2010	Kecskemét	0	(0)
2010	Rákospalota	12	(2)
2010–2012	Bihor Oradea	19	(7)
2012	Debrecen II	10	(3)
2012–2013	Kozármisleny	12	(3)
2013–2014	Dunaújváros	4	(0)
2014	Tatabánya	6	(1)
2014–2018	Békéscsaba	112	(45)
2018–	Vasas	74	(26)
2022–	→ III. Kerület (loan)	0	(0)
- * Club domestic league appearances and goals as of 20:56, 4 February 2022 (UTC)

Botond Birtalan (born 8 April 1989 in Budapest) is a Hungarian football forward player who plays for III. Kerületi TVE on loan from Vasas SC.
