= Szilveszter Hangya =

Hungarian footballer (born 1994)

Personal information
- Date of birth: 2 January 1994 (age 32)
- Place of birth: Baja, Hungary
- Height: 1.76 m (5 ft 9 in)
- Position: Left back

Team information
- Current team: Honvéd
- Number: 11

Youth career
- 2004–2008: Baja
- 2008–2011: MTK

Senior career*
| Years | Team | Apps | (Gls) |
| 2011–2014 | MTK | 3 | (0) |
| 2011–2014 | MTK II | 21 | (1) |
| 2014 | → Dunaújváros (loan) | 1 | (0) |
| 2014 | → Dunaújváros II (loan) | 2 | (1) |
| 2015–2018 | Vasas | 97 | (2) |
| 2018–2024 | Fehérvár | 74 | (1) |
| 2018–2024 | Fehérvár II | 5 | (0) |
| 2024– | Honvéd | 53 | (1) |

International career^{‡}
| 2010–2011 | Hungary U-18 | 3 | (0) |
| 2014 | Hungary U-20 | 1 | (0) |
| 2014–2016 | Hungary U-21 | 11 | (0) |
| 2016– | Hungary | 10 | (0) |
- * Club domestic league appearances and goals as of 31 May 2026 ‡ National team caps and goals as of 25 May 2025

Szilveszter Hangya (born 2 January 1994) is a Hungarian professional footballer who plays as a defender for Nemzeti Bajnokság II club Honvéd.

== International career ==
In November 2016 Hangya received his first call-up to the senior Hungary squad for matches against Andorra and Sweden.

== Career statistics ==
As of match played 25 May 2025

Appearances and goals by club, season and competition
| Club | Season | League | | | National cup (Note: Includes Magyar Kupa) | | League cup (Note: Includes Ligakupa) | | Europe | | Other | | Total | |
| Club | Season | Division | Apps | Goals | Apps | Goals | Apps | Goals | Apps | Goals | Apps | Goals | Apps | Goals |
|---|---|---|---|---|---|---|---|---|---|---|---|---|---|---|
| MTK | 2011–12 | Nemzeti Bajnokság II | 2 | 0 | — | | — | | — | | — | | 2 | 0 |
| MTK | 2012–13 | Nemzeti Bajnokság I | — | | — | | 1 | 0 | — | | — | | 1 | 0 |
| MTK | 2013–14 | Nemzeti Bajnokság I | 1 | 0 | — | | 4 | 1 | — | | — | | 5 | 1 |
| MTK | Total | | 3 | 0 | — | | 5 | 1 | — | | — | | 8 | 1 |
| MTK II | 2012–13 | Nemzeti Bajnokság III | 21 | 1 | — | | — | | — | | 2 (Note: Appearances in Nemzeti Bajnokság III Relegation play-offs) | 0 | 23 | 1 |
| Dunaújváros (loan) | 2014–15 | Nemzeti Bajnokság I | 1 | 0 | — | | 7 | 0 | — | | — | | 8 | 0 |
| Dunaújváros II (loan) | 2014–15 | Megyei Bajnokság I | 2 | 1 | — | | — | | — | | — | | 2 | 1 |
| Vasas | 2014–15 | Nemzeti Bajnokság II | 13 | 0 | — | | — | | — | | — | | 13 | 0 |
| Vasas | 2015–16 | Nemzeti Bajnokság I | 26 | 1 | 2 | 0 | — | | — | | — | | 28 | 1 |
| Vasas | 2016–17 | Nemzeti Bajnokság I | 30 | 0 | 8 | 2 | — | | — | | — | | 38 | 2 |
| Vasas | 2017–18 | Nemzeti Bajnokság I | 28 | 1 | 1 | 0 | — | | 2 (Note: Appearances in UEFA Europa League) | 0 | — | | 31 | 1 |
| Vasas | Total | | 97 | 2 | 11 | 2 | — | | 2 | 0 | — | | 110 | 4 |
| Fehérvár | 2018–19 | Nemzeti Bajnokság I | 5 | 0 | 5 | 1 | — | | 1 | 0 | — | | 11 | 1 |
| Fehérvár | 2019–20 | Nemzeti Bajnokság I | 21 | 0 | 5 | 0 | — | | 0 | 0 | — | | 26 | 0 |
| Fehérvár | 2020–21 | Nemzeti Bajnokság I | 25 | 1 | 4 | 0 | — | | 2 | 0 | — | | 31 | 1 |
| Fehérvár | 2021–22 | Nemzeti Bajnokság I | 13 | 0 | 2 | 0 | — | | — | | — | | 15 | 0 |
| Fehérvár | 2022–23 | Nemzeti Bajnokság I | 10 | 0 | 1 | 0 | — | | 5 (Note: Appearances in UEFA Europa Conference League) | 0 | — | | 16 | 0 |
| Fehérvár | 2023–24 | Nemzeti Bajnokság I | 0 | 0 | — | | — | | — | | — | | 0 | 0 |
| Fehérvár | Total | | 74 | 1 | 17 | 1 | — | | 8 | 0 | — | | 99 | 2 |
| Fehérvár II | 2018–19 | Nemzeti Bajnokság III | 1 | 0 | — | | — | | — | | — | | 1 | 0 |
| Fehérvár II | 2021–22 | Nemzeti Bajnokság III | 3 | 0 | — | | — | | — | | — | | 3 | 0 |
| Fehérvár II | 2022–23 | Nemzeti Bajnokság III | 1 | 0 | — | | — | | — | | — | | 1 | 0 |
| Fehérvár II | Total | | 5 | 0 | — | | — | | — | | — | | 5 | 0 |
| Honvéd | 2024–25 | Nemzeti Bajnokság II | 24 | 1 | 1 | 0 | — | | — | | — | | 25 | 1 |
| Career total | | | 227 | 6 | 29 | 3 | 12 | 1 | 10 | 0 | 2 | 0 | 280 | 10 |

== Honours ==
MTK

- Nemzeti Bajnokság II: 2011–12

Vasas

- Nemzeti Bajnokság II: 2014–15

Fehérvár

- Magyar Kupa: 2018–19
