= Yevhen Pavlov =

Ukrainian footballer (born 1991)

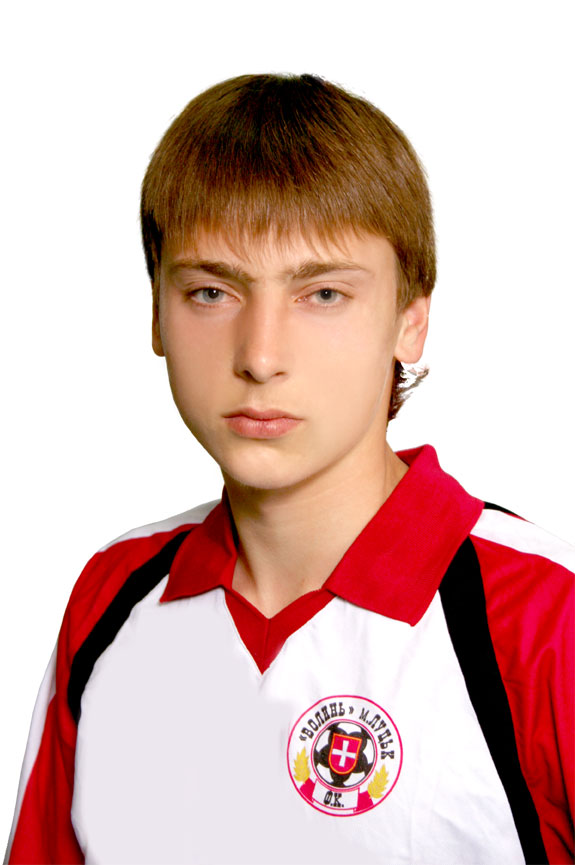
- Pavlov with Volyn Lutsk in 2008

Personal information
- Full name: Yevhen Stepanovych Pavlov
- Date of birth: 12 March 1991 (age 35)
- Place of birth: Sevastopol, Ukraine
- Height: 1.91 m (6 ft 3 in)
- Position: Striker

Team information
- Current team: Bor
- Number: 9

Youth career
- 2003–2008: Volyn Lutsk

Senior career*
Years	Team	Apps	(Gls)
2007–2013	Volyn Lutsk	110	(20)
2014	Sevastopol	3	(0)
2014	Sokol Saratov	18	(2)
2015	Mladost Lučani	16	(3)
2015–2018	Vasas	73	(13)
2018–2019	Doxa Katokopias	27	(4)
2019–2021	Radnik Surdulica	38	(16)
2021	Shakhter Karagandy	7	(0)
2021–2022	Radnički Niš	18	(0)
2022–2023	OFK Vršac	30	(11)
2023–2024	Železničar Pančevo	35	(6)
2024–2025	Radnik Surdulica	40	(10)
2025–2026	Dubočica	29	(6)
2026–	Bor	10	(0)

International career^{‡}
2005	Ukraine U16	1	(0)
2006	Ukraine U17	2	(0)
2008–2009	Ukraine U18	5	(2)
2009–2010	Ukraine U19	12	(1)
2010	Ukraine U20	1	(2)
2010–2012	Ukraine U21	14	(2)
- * Club domestic league appearances and goals as of 23 September 2026 ‡ National team caps and goals as of 26 June 2023

Yevhen Stepanovych Pavlov (Ukrainian: Євген Степанович Павлов), Yevgeny Stepanovich Pavlov (Russian: Евгений Степанович Павлов; born 12 March 1991) is a Ukrainian professional footballer who plays as a striker for Serbian club Bor.

== Club career ==
Pavlov came through the youth system of Volyn Lutsk. He scored on his first team debut after coming on as a second-half substitute in a 2–1 home win over Obolon Kyiv on 20 March 2007, aged 16. Pavlov had his highest goalscoring tally in the 2009–10 season, netting 11 goals in 19 league appearances, as the club won promotion to the Ukrainian Premier League. He spent three more seasons at the club, before being released in the summer of 2013.

After being without a club for several months, Pavlov had a trial with Serbian champions Partizan in December 2013. He scored two goals for their affiliated side Teleoptik in a test match, but failed to sign a contract. He eventually signed with Sevastopol in March 2014, making three league appearances until the end of the 2013–14 season.

After the annexation of Crimea, including Sevastopol, by Russia, Pavlov took Russian citizenship and adopted the name Yevgeny Pavlov. In August 2014, he joined Russian club Sokol Saratov.

In January 2015, Pavlov returned to Serbia by signing a permanent contract for SuperLiga club Mladost Lučani. He made 10 league appearances and scored two goals until the end of the 2014–15 season.

On 18 August 2015 Pavlov signed a three-year deal with Hungarian club Vasas.

On 6 September 2021, he signed with Radnički Niš in Serbia.

== International career ==
Pavlov represented his country at all youth international levels from Under-16 to Under-21.

== Statistics ==
As of 6 September 2015

Club	Season	League		Cup		Continental		Total	
Club	Season	Apps	Goals	Apps	Goals	Apps	Goals	Apps	Goals
Volyn Lutsk	2006–07	4	1	0	0	0	0	4	1
Volyn Lutsk	2007–08	18	0	0	0	0	0	18	0
Volyn Lutsk	2008–09	18	4	1	0	0	0	19	4
Volyn Lutsk	2009–10	19	11	1	0	0	0	20	11
Volyn Lutsk	2010–11	20	2	1	0	0	0	21	2
Volyn Lutsk	2011–12	20	2	1	0	0	0	21	2
Volyn Lutsk	2012–13	11	0	2	1	0	0	13	1
Volyn Lutsk	Total	110	20	6	1	0	0	116	21
Sevastopol	2013–14	3	0	0	0	0	0	3	0
Sevastopol	Total	3	0	0	0	0	0	3	0
Sokol Saratov	2014–15	16	1	2	1	0	0	18	2
Sokol Saratov	Total	16	1	2	1	0	0	18	2
Mladost Lučani	2014–15	10	2	0	0	0	0	10	2
Mladost Lučani	2015–16	6	1	0	0	0	0	6	1
Mladost Lučani	Total	16	3	0	0	0	0	16	3
Vasas	2015–16	0	0	0	0	0	0	0	0
Vasas	Total	0	0	0	0	0	0	0	0
Career total		145	24	8	2	0	0	153	26
