= Ilias Ignatidis =

Greek footballer

Personal information
- Date of birth: 11 November 1996 (age 30)
- Place of birth: Thessaloniki, Greece
- Height: 1.91 m (6 ft 3 in)
- Position: Forward

Team information
- Current team: Asteras Agios Nikolaos

Youth career
- –2013: Aris
- 2013–2016: Olympiacos
- 2015–2016: → Kallithea (loan)

Senior career*
| Years | Team | Apps | (Gls) |
| 2016 | Vasas | 3 | (0) |
| 2016–2017 | Levski Karlovo | 11 | (4) |
| 2017–2018 | Poseidon Michaniona | | |
| 2018–2019 | Aris Palaiochori | 35 | (14) |
| 2019–2020 | Poseidon Michaniona | | |
| 2020–2021 | Aetos Vasilika | | |
| 2021 | → Makedonikos (loan) | 0 | (0) |
| 2021–2022 | Poseidon Michaniona | 24 | (14) |
| 2022–2023 | Kampaniakos | 34 | (25) |
| 2023–2024 | Panionios | 34 | (23) |
| 2024 | Olympiakos Nicosia | 9 | (1) |
| 2024–2025 | Marko | 15 | (6) |
| 2025–2026 | Aetos Ofrynio | | |
| 2026– | Asteras Agios Nikolaos | | |
- * Club domestic league appearances and goals as of 15 May 2025

Ilias Ignatidis (Greek: Ηλίας Ιγνατίδης; born 11 November 1996) is a Greek professional footballer who plays as a forward for Gamma Ethniki club Asteras Agios Nikolaos.

== Career ==
Ignatidis joined the Bulgarian club Levski Karlovo in October. He scored a brace on his debut for the team in a 2–1 home win against Ludogorets Razgrad II.

Ignatidis played for Poseidon Nea Michanionas from the summer 2017 until January 2018, before joining Aris Paleochoriou. However, he returned to the club on 30 July 2019.

In December 2024 he signed a contract with GS Marko He was released in June 2025.

== Career statistics ==
=== Club ===
As of 20 July 2023

| Club performance | | | League | | Cup | | Continental | | Other | | Total | |
| Club | League | Season | Apps | Goals | Apps | Goals | Apps | Goals | Apps | Goals | Apps | Goals |
| Hungary | | | League | | Magyar Kupa | | Europe | | Other (Note: Includes Szuperkupa matches.) | | Total | |
|---|---|---|---|---|---|---|---|---|---|---|---|---|
| Vasas | Nemzeti Bajnokság I | 2015–16 | 3 | 0 | 0 | 0 | – | | – | | 3 | 0 |
| Vasas | Total | | 3 | 0 | 0 | 0 | 0 | 0 | 0 | 0 | 3 | 0 |
| Bulgaria | | | League | | Bulgarian Cup | | Europe | | Other (Note: Includes Bulgarian Supercup matches.) | | Total | |
| Levski Karlovo | Vtora Liga | 2016–17 | 6 | 3 | 0 | 0 | — | | — | | 6 | 3 |
| Levski Karlovo | Total | | 6 | 3 | 0 | 0 | 0 | 0 | 0 | 0 | 6 | 3 |
| Greece | | | League | | Greek Cup | | Europe | | Other (Note: Includes Promotional Play off matches.) | | Total | |
| Aris Palaiochori | Gamma Ethniki | 2017–18 | 13 | 5 | 0 | 0 | — | | — | | 13 | 5 |
| Aris Palaiochori | Gamma Ethniki | 2018–19 | 22 | 9 | 0 | 0 | — | | — | | 22 | 9 |
| Aris Palaiochori | Total | | 35 | 14 | 0 | 0 | 0 | 0 | 0 | 0 | 35 | 14 |
| Poseidon Michaniona | Gamma Ethniki | 2021–22 | 21 | 10 | 3 | 4 | — | | — | | 24 | 14 |
| Poseidon Michaniona | Total | | 21 | 10 | 3 | 4 | 0 | 0 | 0 | 0 | 24 | 14 |
| Kampaniakos | Gamma Ethniki | 2022–23 | 27 | 22 | 0 | 0 | – | | 7 | 3 | 34 | 25 |
| Kampaniakos | Total | | 27 | 22 | 0 | 0 | 0 | 0 | 7 | 3 | 34 | 25 |
| Career statistics | | | 92 | 49 | 3 | 4 | 0 | 0 | 7 | 3 | 102 | 56 |
