= Balázs Bényei =

Hungarian footballer

Personal information
- Date of birth: 10 January 1990 (age 36)
- Place of birth: Debrecen, Hungary
- Height: 1.87 m (6 ft 2 in)
- Position: Defender

Team information
- Current team: DEAC

Youth career
- 2002–2008: Debrecen

Senior career*
Years	Team	Apps	(Gls)
2008–2014	Debrecen II	29	(0)
2008–2012	→ Létavértes (loan)	54	(2)
2012–2013	→ Mezőkövesd (loan)	8	(0)
2013–2014	→ Létavértes (loan)	25	(1)
2014–2017	Békéscsaba	77	(2)
2017–2021	Debrecen	58	(0)
2021	→ DEAC (loan)	12	(1)
2021–	DEAC	0	(0)
- * Club domestic league appearances and goals as of 2 May 2021

Balázs Bényei (born 10 January 1990) is a Hungarian football player who plays for DEAC.

== Career ==
=== Debrecen ===
On 29 July 2017, Kinyik played his first match for Debrecen in a 1–1 drawn against Paks in the Hungarian League.

== Career statistics ==
As of 27 June 2020

Appearances and goals by club, season and competition
Club	Season	League		Cup		League Cup		Europe		Total	
Club	Season	Apps	Goals	Apps	Goals	Apps	Goals	Apps	Goals	Apps	Goals
Létavértes
Létavértes	2008–09	30	1	0	0	–	–	–	–	30	1
Létavértes	2009–10	24	1	0	0	–	–	–	–	24	1
Létavértes	2011–12	11	3	0	0	–	–	–	–	11	3
Létavértes	2013–14	25	1	0	0	–	–	–	–	25	1
Létavértes	Total	90	6	0	0	0	0	0	0	90	6
Debrecen II
Debrecen II	2010–11	15	0	2	0	–	–	–	–	17	0
Debrecen II	2015–16	14	0	2	0	–	–	–	–	16	0
Debrecen II	Total	29	0	4	0	0	0	0	0	33	0
Mezőkövesd
Mezőkövesd	2012–13	8	0	0	0	–	–	–	–	8	0
Mezőkövesd	Total	8	0	0	0	0	0	0	0	8	0
Békéscsaba
Békéscsaba	2014–15	26	1	3	0	3	0	–	–	32	1
Békéscsaba	2015–16	28	0	6	0	–	–	–	–	34	0
Békéscsaba	2016–17	23	1	2	0	–	–	–	–	25	1
Békéscsaba	Total	77	2	11	0	3	0	0	0	91	2
Debrecen
Debrecen	2017–18	27	0	2	0	–	–	–	–	29	0
Debrecen	2018–19	8	0	2	1	–	–	–	–	10	1
Debrecen	2019–20	19	0	1	0	–	–	0	0	20	0
Debrecen	Total	54	0	5	1	0	0	0	0	59	1
Career total		258	8	20	1	3	0	0	0	281	9
