= 2022–23 Gyirmót FC Győr season =

Gyirmót FC Győr
2022–23 season
- Chairman: Ernő Horváth
- Manager: Aurél Csertői
- Stadium: Ménfői úti Stadion
- Nemzeti Bajnokság II: 6th
- Magyar Kupa: Round of 64
- Top goalscorer: League: Dominik Soltész (12); All: Dominik Soltész (12)
- Highest home attendance: 2,356 vs Győr (2 April 2023); Nemzeti Bajnokság II
- Lowest home attendance: 326 vs Pécs (30 April 2023); Nemzeti Bajnokság II
- Average home league attendance: 834
- Biggest win: 4–0 vs Szentlőrinc (H) (30 July 2022); Nemzeti Bajnokság II; 4–0 vs Győr (H) (2 April 2023); Nemzeti Bajnokság II
- Biggest defeat: 2–5 vs MTK Budapest (A) (4 December 2022); Nemzeti Bajnokság II; 0–3 vs Szeged (A) (14 May 2023); Nemzeti Bajnokság II
Home colours	Away colours

The 2022–23 season was Gyirmót FC Győr's 16th competitive season, 1st consecutive season in the Nemzeti Bajnokság II and 42nd year in existence as a football club. In addition to the domestic league, Gyirmót participated in this season's editions of the Magyar Kupa.

== Transfers ==
=== Summer ===
In: Note: Flags indicate national team as defined under FIFA eligibility rules; some limited exceptions apply. Players may hold more than one non-FIFA nationality.

No.	Pos.	Nation	Player
—	DF	HUN	Kristóf Polgár (from Diósgyőr)
—	MF	HUN	Patrik Király (from Békéscsaba)
—	MF	HUN	István Berki (from Győr)
—	MF	HUN	Milán Kovács (from Vasas)
—	MF	HUN	Dominik Soltész (from Budapest Honvéd II)
—	FW	HUN	Bence Pethő (from Paks)
—	DF	HUN	Márk Helembai (from MTK Budapest II)
—	FW	HUN	Milán Erdei (from Győr II)
—	DF	UKR	Artem Nagirnyi (loan from Puskás Akadémia II)

Out: Note: Flags indicate national team as defined under FIFA eligibility rules; some limited exceptions apply. Players may hold more than one non-FIFA nationality.

No.	Pos.	Nation	Player
—	MF	BLR	Vladislav Klimovich (to (Cyprus) Nea Salamis)
—	LW	MKD	Matej Cvetanoski (to (Albania) Partizani Tirana)
—	DF	HUN	Imre Széles (to Kisvárda)
—	MF	SVK	Denis Ventúra (to (Czech Republic) Sigma Olomouc)
—	RW	KOS	Florent Hasani (to (Albania) Tirana)
—	DF	CRO	Frane Ikić (to (Bosnia and Herzegovina) Velež Mostar)
—	DF	ROU	Cornel Ene (to (Romania) Mioveni)
—	DF	HUN	Henrik Kirják (to III. Kerület)
—	FW	HUN	Barnabás Varga (to Paks)
—	RW	CUW	Gino van Kessel
—	DF	HUN	Márió Zeke (loan return to Fehérvár)

== Competitions ==
=== Overview ===
Competition	First match	Last match	Starting round	Final position	Record							
Competition	First match	Last match	Starting round	Final position	Pld	W	D	L	GF	GA	GD	Win %
Nemzeti Bajnokság II	30 July 2022	21 May 2023	Matchday 1	6th	38	17	9	12	59	46	+13	44.74
Hungarian Cup	17 September 2022	17 September 2022	Round of 64	Round of 64	1	0	0	1	2	3	−1	0.00
Total					39	17	9	13	61	49	+12	43.59

Source: Competitions

=== Nemzeti Bajnokság II ===
==== League table ====
Pos	Team	Pld	W	D	L	GF	GA	GD	Pts
4	Szeged	38	18	10	10	50	38	+12	64
5	Soroksár	38	16	13	9	57	48	+9	61
6	Gyirmót	38	17	9	12	59	46	+13	60
7	Pécs	38	14	16	8	38	31	+7	58
8	Siófok	38	15	11	12	45	51	−6	56

Source: Hungarian Football Federation (in Hungarian), Soccerway
Rules for classification: 1) Points; 2) Matches won; 3) Goal difference; 4) Goals scored; 5) Head-to-head points; 6) Head-to-head goal difference; 7) Fair play ranking; 8) Drawing of lots.

==== Results summary ====
Overall								Home						Away					
Pld	W	D	L	GF	GA	GD	Pts	W	D	L	GF	GA	GD	W	D	L	GF	GA	GD
38	17	9	12	59	46	+13	60	8	3	8	31	22	+9	9	6	4	28	24	+4

Last updated: 15 May 2023.
Source: Soccerway

==== Results by round ====
Round	1	2	3	4	5	6	7	8	9	10	11	12	13	14	15	16	17	18	19	20	21	22	23	24	25	26	27	28	29	30	31	32	33	34	35	36	37	38
Ground	H	A	H	A	H	A	H	A	H	A	H	A	H	A	H	A	H	H	A	A	H	A	H	A	H	A	H	A	H	A	H	A	H	A	H	A	A	H
Result	W	W	L	D	W	W	L	W	L	W	L	W	D	W	L	D	W	L	L	D	D	D	W	W	W	L	W	W	W	D	L	D	W	L	D	W	L	L
Position	1	1	5	4	4	2	3	2	3	3	4	3	4	3	4	5	5	5	5	6	5	7	5	4	4	4	4	3	3	4	4	4	4	4	4	4	5	6

Source: Matches
A = Away; H = Home; W = Win; D = Draw; L = Loss

==== Matches ====
30 July 2022 1	Gyirmót	4–0	Szentlőrinc	Győr
17:30 CEST (UTC+2)	Pethő 7', 29'; M. Kovács 22'; Csörgő 53'; Hajdú (yellow card) 68'	Report	Mervó (yellow card) 68'; Tamás (yellow card) 83'	Stadium: Ménfői úti Stadion; Attendance: 1,042; Referee: Tamás Takács

7 August 2022 2	Dorog	1–4	Gyirmót	Dorog
17:30 CEST (UTC+2)	Tóth 81'	Report	Csörgő 5', (yellow card) 23'; Nagy 20'; Helembai 46'; Major (yellow card) 73'; Herjeczki 76'	Stadium: Buzánszky Jenő Stadion; Attendance: 522; Referee: Róbert Nagy

14 August 2022 3	Gyirmót	0–1	Békéscsaba	Győr
17:30 CEST (UTC+2)		Report	Fazekas (yellow card) 36'; Mikló (yellow card) 42'; Kitl (yellow card) 50'; Máris (yellow card) 80'; Hamed 90+2'	Stadium: Ménfői úti Stadion; Attendance: 1,043; Referee: Bálint Dolnegó

17 August 2022 4	Budafok	0–0	Gyirmót	Budapest
19:00 CEST (UTC+2)	Kalmár (yellow card) 39'	Report		Stadium: Promontor utcai Stadion; Attendance: 900; Referee: Mihály Káprály

21 August 2022 5	Gyirmót	3–1	Mosonmagyaróvár	Győr
17:30 CEST (UTC+2)	Nagy 5', 13' (pen.), 74' (pen.)	Report	Czingráber (yellow card) 46'; Monori 48'; Szabó (yellow card) 59'	Stadium: Ménfői úti Stadion; Attendance: 1,432; Referee: Tamás Sipos

28 August 2022 6	Kozármisleny	0–1	Gyirmót	Kozármisleny
19:00 CEST (UTC+2)	Gajág (yellow card) 50'	Report	Szegi (yellow card) 43'; Simon (yellow card) 47'; Pethő 49', (yellow card) 90+4'; Hársfalvi (yellow card) 86'; Medgyes (red card) 89'	Stadium: Kozármislenyi Stadion; Attendance: 730; Referee: Tibor Farkas

5 September 2022 7	Gyirmót	1–2	Diósgyőr	Győr
20:15 CEST (UTC+2)	Polgár (yellow card) 12'; Nagy 44' (pen.); Csörgő (yellow card) 53'; Nagirnyi (yellow card) 90+3'	Report	Bokros (yellow card) 27'; Papp 34'; Cseke (yellow card) 76'; Szatmári (yellow card) 83'; Lukács (yellow card) 83'; Eppel 87'	Stadium: Ménfői úti Stadion; Attendance: 1,300; Referee: Péter Zierkelbach

11 September 2022 8	Csákvár	1–2	Gyirmót	Csákvár
16:00 CEST (UTC+2)	Tamás (yellow card) 3'; Fejős 41'	Report	Medgyes 8'; Polgár 13'; Szegi (yellow card) 81'	Stadium: Tersztyánszky Ödön Sportközpont; Attendance: 300; Referee: László Lovas

2 October 2022 9	Gyirmót	2–3	Nyíregyháza	Győr
15:00 CEST (UTC+2)	Herjeczki 15'; Nagy (yellow card) 24'; Medgyes 38'; Csörgő (yellow card) 50'; D. Kovács (yellow card) 80'	Report	Pantović (yellow card) 2', (goal) 45+2'; Novák 17', 59', (yellow card) 65'	Stadium: Ménfői úti Stadion; Attendance: 618; Referee: Marcell Derdák

5 October 2022 10	Győr	0–2	Gyirmót	Győr
17:00 CEST (UTC+2)	Kovács (yellow card) 67'; Benczenleitner (yellow card) 81'	Report	M. Kovács (yellow card) 52'; Herjeczki 56'; Szegi (yellow card) 69'; Medgyes 82'	Stadium: ETO Park; Attendance: 1,124; Referee: Bence Hanyecz

9 October 2022 11	Gyirmót	1–2	Haladás	Győr
15:00 CEST (UTC+2)	Herjeczki (yellow card) 14'; Pethő 26'; Medgyes (yellow card) 37'; Szegi (yellow card) 79'; Rusák (yellow card) 90+2'	Report	Csató (yellow card) 22'; Csilus (yellow card) 39'; Szegi 55' (o.g.); Taipi 72'; Derekas (yellow card) 75'	Stadium: Ménfői úti Stadion; Attendance: 954; Referee: Attila Molnár

16 October 2022 12	Siófok	1–3	Gyirmót	Siófok
17:00 CEST (UTC+2)	Balogh 14'; Makrai (yellow card) 86'	Report	M. Kovács (yellow card) 33'; Berki 42'; Simon 77', 90+3'	Stadium: Révész Géza utcai Stadion; Attendance: 580; Referee: József Ducsai

22 October 2022 13	Gyirmót	2–2	Soroksár	Győr
13:00 CEST (UTC+2)	Vass 3'; Rusák (red card) 18'; Medgyes 42'; Szegi (yellow card) 64'; Simon (yellow card) 78'	Report	Króner (yellow card) 53'; Lisztes 58'; Erdélyi (yellow card) 62'; Halmai 90+4'	Stadium: Ménfői úti Stadion; Attendance: 638; Referee: Ádám Pillók

30 October 2022 14	Tiszakécske	0–1	Gyirmót	Tiszakécske
15:00 CET (UTC+1)		Report	Berki 57'	Stadium: Városi Stadion; Attendance: 400; Referee: Tamás Berényi

6 November 2022 15	Gyirmót	1–3	Ajka	Győr
13:00 CET (UTC+1)	Nagy 35' (pen.); Simon (yellow card) 81'	Report	Csemer (yellow card) 4'; Doncsecz 20'; Zsolnai (yellow card) 37', (goal) 40'; Berzsenyi 78'; Vogyicska (yellow card) 90'; Présinger (yellow card) 90+2'	Stadium: Ménfői úti Stadion; Attendance: 825; Referee: Balázs Katona

9 November 2022 16	Pécs	1–1	Gyirmót	Pécs
18:00 CET (UTC+1)	Tóth-Gábor 12' (pen.); Rácz (yellow card) 39'; Mayer (yellow card) 55'	Report	Erdei 59'; Major (yellow card) 75'; Csörgő (yellow card) 86'	Stadium: Stadion PMFC; Attendance: 1,200; Referee: Péter Antal

13 November 2022 17	Gyirmót	3–0	Kazincbarcika	Győr
13:00 CET (UTC+1)	Simon 31'; M. Kovács 48'; Medgyes (yellow card) 54'; Székely 63' (o.g.)	Report	Csatári (yellow card) 43'; Laczkó (yellow card) 64'	Stadium: Ménfői úti Stadion; Attendance: 525; Referee: Gergő Bogár

26 November 2022 18	Gyirmót	0–1	Szeged	Győr
13:00 CET (UTC+1)	Szegi (yellow card) 18'; Soltész (yellow card) 85'	Report	Szakály 30'	Stadium: Ménfői úti Stadion; Attendance: 587; Referee: Csaba Pintér

4 December 2022 19	MTK Budapest	5–2	Gyirmót	Budapest
13:00 CET (UTC+1)	Németh 21', 37'; Stieber 29'; Kata (yellow card) 33'; Poór (yellow card) 63'; Zsóri 90+2', 90+4'	Report	Szegi (yellow card) 9'; Polgár 12'; Csörgő 45'	Stadium: Hidegkuti Nándor Stadion; Attendance: 420; Referee: István Vad

11 December 2022 20	Szentlőrinc	0–0	Gyirmót	Szentlőrinc
13:00 CET (UTC+1)	Keresztes (yellow card) 63'	Report	Szegi (yellow card) 70'; Nagy (yellow card) 73'; Vass (yellow card) 80'	Stadium: Szentlőrinci Sporttelep; Attendance: 310; Referee: Gergely Bana

29 January 2023 21	Gyirmót	1–1	Dorog	Győr
13:00 CET (UTC+1)	Soltész (yellow card) 73'; Berki 83'	Report	Szalai 41'; Sztojka (yellow card) 52'; Magyari (yellow card) 69'	Stadium: Ménfői úti Stadion; Attendance: 521; Referee: Marcell Derdák

5 February 2023 22	Békéscsaba	1–1	Gyirmót	Békéscsaba
14:00 CET (UTC+1)	Máris (yellow card) 21'; Horváth 27' (pen.); Bora (yellow card) 34'; Czékus (yellow card) 90+2'	Report	Medgyes (yellow card) 11'; Soltész (yellow card) 38'; Major (yellow card) 69'; Madarász 83'	Stadium: Kórház utcai Stadion; Attendance: 460; Referee: Imre Kovács

12 February 2023 23	Gyirmót	2–1	Budafok	Győr
14:00 CET (UTC+1)	Madarász 17'; Medgyes 33'; Szegi (yellow card) 43'; M. Kovács (yellow card) 80'; Erdei (yellow card) 85'; Kichun (yellow card) 87'; Rusák (yellow card) 90+6'	Report	Adorján (yellow card) 33'; O. Horváth (yellow card) 40'; Fótyik 65', (yellow card) 85'; Gundel-Takács (yellow card) 85'; Jagodics (yellow card) 86'	Stadium: Ménfői úti Stadion; Attendance: 628; Referee: József Ducskai

19 February 2023 24	Mosonmagyaróvár	1–2	Gyirmót	Mosonmagyaróvár
14:00 CET (UTC+1)	Vukasović (yellow card) 31'; Z. Nagy 84'	Report	Soltész 11' (pen.); Simon 39'; Nagirnyi (yellow card) 87'; Hársfalvi (yellow card) 88'	Stadium: Wittmann Antal park Attendance: 240; Referee: Tamás Berényi

26 February 2023 25	Gyirmót	2–0	Kozármisleny	Győr
14:00 CET (UTC+1)	Szegi 17'; Madarász (yellow card) 77'; Nagirnyi (yellow card) 78'; Berki 90+2'	Report		Stadium: Ménfői úti Stadion; Attendance: 529; Referee: Tamás Nazsa

6 March 2023 26	Diósgyőr	3–1	Gyirmót	Miskolc
19:00 CET (UTC+1)	Szatmári 41'; Obounet 61', 76'; Farkaš (yellow card) 64'	Report	Csörgő (yellow card) 22'; Szegi (yellow card) 30'; Soltész 51'; Berki (yellow card) 89'	Stadium: DVTK Stadion; Attendance: 2,492; Referee: Ádám Pillók

12 March 2023 27	Gyirmót	2–1	Csákvár	Győr
14:00 CET (UTC+1)	Soltész 17', 23'; Kovács (yellow card) 40'; Simon (yellow card) 72'	Report	Körmendi 29'; Magyar (yellow card) 53'; Vaskó (yellow card) 76'	Stadium: Ménfői úti Stadion; Attendance: 519; Referee: Ákos Gaál

19 March 2023 28	Nyíregyháza	2–3	Gyirmót	Balmazújváros
14:00 CET (UTC+1)	Novák (yellow card) 19', (goal) 26'; Pantović 67' (pen.); Baki (yellow card) 88'	Report	M. Kovács (yellow card) 8'; Soltész 23' (pen.), 65'; Polgár (yellow card) 37'; Hársfalvi (yellow card) 66'; Medgyes 80'; Nagy (yellow card) 83'; Erdei (yellow card) 88'	Stadium: Városi Stadion; Attendance: 250; Referee: Imre Kovács

2 April 2023 29	Gyirmót	4–0	Győr	Győr
16:00 CEST (UTC+2)	Soltész 12'; Csontos 16', 74' (o.g.); Medgyes 18'	Report		Stadium: Ménfői úti Stadion; Attendance: 2,356; Referee: Márton Rúsz
Note: Muñoz (yellow card) 66'

9 April 2023 30	Haladás	3–3	Gyirmót	Szombathely
17:00 CEST (UTC+2)	Horváth (yellow card) 13', (goal) 64'; Rácz (yellow card) 28'; Csilus 72'; Bolla 83'	Report	Soltész 53', 61', 73'; M. Kovács (yellow card) 85'	Stadium: Haladás Sportkomplexum; Attendance: 801; Referee: Tibor Farkas

12 April 2023 31	Gyirmót	1–2	Siófok	Győr
16:00 CEST (UTC+2)	Soltész 44' (pen.); Helembai (yellow card) 78'; Hajdú (yellow card) 86'; Nagy (yellow card) 90+2'	Report	Szakály 2' (pen.); Debreceni (yellow card) 43'; Pataki (yellow card) 56'; Farkas 84'	Stadium: Ménfői úti Stadion; Attendance: 529; Referee: Tamás Takács

16 April 2023 32	Soroksár	1–1	Gyirmót	Budapest
17:00 CEST (UTC+2)	Lovrencsics 9'; Redzic (yellow card) 50'	Report	Madarász 13'; Helembai (yellow card) 25'; Soltész (yellow card) 60'	Stadium: Sporttelep Mihály Szamosi; Attendance: 400; Referee: Róbert Nagy

23 April 2023 33	Gyirmót	1–0	Tiszakécske	Győr
17:00 CEST (UTC+2)	Medgyes 63'	Report	Horváth (yellow card) 77'	Stadium: Ménfői úti Stadion; Attendance: 512; Referee: Tamás Sipos

26 April 2023 34	Ajka	1–0	Gyirmót	Ajka
17:00 CEST (UTC+2)	Jagodics (yellow card) 4'; Kenderes (yellow card) 16'; Vogyicska (yellow card) 32'; Zsolnai 42'; Horváth (yellow card) 73'; Szarka (yellow card) 78'	Report	Szegi (yellow card) 13'; Soltész (yellow card) 63'; Berki (yellow card) 82'	Stadium: Városi Stadion; Attendance: 1,000; Referee: Attila Molnár
Note: Jeney (yellow card) 77'

30 April 2023 35	Gyirmót	0–0	Pécs	Győr
17:00 CEST (UTC+2)	Madarász (yellow card) 43'; Medgyes (yellow card) 49'; M. Kovács (yellow card) 67'; Erdei (yellow card) 71'; Szegi (yellow card) 85'; Berki (yellow card) 88'	Report	Kocsis (yellow card) 82'	Stadium: Ménfői úti Stadion; Attendance: 326; Referee: Tibor Farkas

7 May 2023 36	Kazincbarcika	0–1	Gyirmót	Kazincbarcika
17:00 CEST (UTC+2)	Kurdics (yellow card) 19'; Süttő (yellow card) 81'; Szemere (yellow card) 90+3'	Report	Soltész 12' (pen.), (yellow card) 85'; Helembai (yellow card) 32'; Medgyes (yellow card) 32'	Stadium: Kolorcity Aréna; Attendance: 480; Referee: József Ducsai

14 May 2023 37	Szeged	3–0	Gyirmót	Szeged
17:00 CEST (UTC+2)	Géresi 11' (pen.), 45' (pen.); Farkas (red card) 52'; Bíró 77'	Report		Stadium: Szent Gellért Fórum; Attendance: 1,295; Referee: Tamás Nazsa

21 May 2023 38	Gyirmót	1–2	MTK Budapest	Győr
17:00 CEST (UTC+2)	Medgyes 46'	Report	Zsóri 32' (pen.); Barkóczi 41'; Szépe (yellow card) 88'	Stadium: Ménfői úti Stadion; Attendance: 972; Referee: Tamás Sipos

=== Magyar Kupa ===
17 September 2022 Round of 64	Iváncsa	3–2	Gyirmót	Iváncsa
15:00 CEST (UTC+2)	Medgyes 10' (o.g.); Kercsó (yellow card) 33'; Suszter 37', 52'; Fehér (yellow card) 90'	Report	M. Kovács (yellow card) 38'; Nagy 68' (pen.), 75'	Stadium: Károlyi István Sporttelep; Referee: Tibor Horváth

== Statistics ==
=== Appearances and goals ===
Last updated on 13 November 2022.

No.	Pos	Nat	Player	Total		Nemzeti Bajnokság II		Hungarian Cup	
No.	Pos	Nat	Player	Apps	Goals	Apps	Goals	Apps	Goals
1	GK	(Hungary) HUN	Barnabás Kecskés	1	-1	1	-1	0	-0
7	MF	(Hungary) HUN	Dominik Soltész	16	0	16	0	0	0
8	MF	(Hungary) HUN	Patrik Nagy	17	8	16	6	1	2
9	FW	(Hungary) HUN	Bence Pethő	16	4	16	4	0	0
10	DF	(Hungary) HUN	Vince Szegi	16	0	15	0	1	0
11	RW	(Hungary) HUN	Kristóf Herjeczki	16	3	15	3	1	0
12	GK	(Hungary) HUN	Edvárd Rusák	6	-10	5	-7	1	-3
14	MF	(Hungary) HUN	István Berki	12	2	11	2	1	0
15	DF	(Hungary) HUN	Martin Major	5	0	5	0	0	0
17	FW	(Hungary) HUN	András Simon	18	3	17	3	1	0
18	MF	(Hungary) HUN	Ádám Hajdú	16	0	15	0	1	0
20	MF	(Hungary) HUN	Dominik Kovács	10	0	9	0	1	0
22	DF	(Hungary) HUN	Márk Helembai	8	1	7	1	1	0
27	DF	(Hungary) HUN	Bálint Bagó	1	0	1	0	0	0
29	FW	(Hungary) HUN	Milán Erdei	6	1	5	1	1	0
33	DF	(Hungary) HUN	Kristóf Polgár	13	1	12	1	1	0
38	MF	(Hungary) HUN	Ádám Vass	17	1	17	1	0	0
39	DF	(Slovakia) SVK	Dávid Hudák	6	0	6	0	0	0
50	FW	(Hungary) HUN	Ádám Mayer	2	0	1	0	1	0
51	GK	(Hungary) HUN	András Hársfalvi	12	-10	12	-10	0	-0
67	DF	(Hungary) HUN	Viktor Csörgő	13	2	13	2	0	0
70	RW	(Hungary) HUN	Zoltán Medgyes	17	4	16	4	1	0
77	DF	(Ukraine) UKR	Artem Nagirnyi	11	0	11	0	0	0
99	MF	(Hungary) HUN	Milán Kovács	17	2	16	2	1	0
Youth players:
16	DF	(Hungary) HUN	Bence Ominger	0	0	0	0	0	0
23	MF	(Hungary) HUN	Patrik Király	0	0	0	0	0	0
25	DF	(Hungary) HUN	Kristóf Tarsoly	0	0	0	0	0	0
90	DF	(Hungary) HUN	Patrik Lázár	0	0	0	0	0	0
Out to loan:
Players no longer at the club:

=== Top scorers ===
Includes all competitive matches. The list is sorted by shirt number when total goals are equal.

Position	Nation	Number	Name	Nemzeti Bajnokság II	Magyar Kupa	Total
1	(Hungary)	7	Dominik Soltész	12	0	12
2	(Hungary)	70	Zoltán Medgyes	9	0	9
3	(Hungary)	8	Patrik Nagy	6	2	8
4	(Hungary)	9	Bence Pethő	4	0	4
4	(Hungary)	14	István Berki	4	0	4
4	(Hungary)	17	András Simon	4	0	4
7	(Hungary)	11	Kristóf Herjeczki	3	0	3
7	(Hungary)	67	Viktor Csörgő	3	0	3
7	(Hungary)	95	Márk Madarász	3	0	3
10	(Hungary)	33	Kristóf Polgár	2	0	2
10	(Hungary)	99	Milán Kovács	2	0	2
12	(Hungary)	10	Vince Szegi	1	0	1
12	(Hungary)	22	Márk Helembai	1	0	1
12	(Hungary)	29	Milán Erdei	1	0	1
12	(Hungary)	38	Ádám Vass	1	0	1
/	/	/	Own Goals	3	0	3
			TOTALS	59	2	61

=== Disciplinary record ===
Includes all competitive matches. Players with 1 card or more included only.

Last updated on 13 November 2022

Position	Nation	Number	Name	Nemzeti Bajnokság II		Hungarian Cup		Total (Hu Total)	
Position	Nation	Number	Name	Yellow card	Red card	Yellow card	Red card	Yellow card	Red card
MF	(Hungary)	8	Patrik Nagy	1	0	0	0	1 (1)	0 (0)
FW	(Hungary)	9	Bence Pethő	1	0	0	0	1 (1)	0 (0)
DF	(Hungary)	10	Vince Szegi	5	0	0	0	5 (5)	0 (0)
FW	(Hungary)	11	Kristóf Herjeczki	1	0	0	0	1 (1)	0 (0)
GK	(Hungary)	12	Edvárd Rusák	1	1	0	0	1 (1)	1 (1)
DF	(Hungary)	15	Martin Major	2	0	0	0	2 (2)	0 (0)
FW	(Hungary)	17	András Simon	3	0	0	0	3 (3)	0 (0)
MF	(Hungary)	18	Ádám Hajdú	1	0	0	0	1 (1)	0 (0)
MF	(Hungary)	20	Dominik Kovács	1	0	0	0	1 (1)	0 (0)
DF	(Hungary)	33	Kristóf Polgár	1	0	0	0	1 (1)	0 (0)
GK	(Hungary)	51	András Hársfalvi	1	0	0	0	1 (1)	0 (0)
DF	(Hungary)	67	Viktor Csörgő	4	0	0	0	4 (4)	0 (0)
RW	(Hungary)	70	Zoltán Medgyes	2	1	0	0	2 (2)	1 (1)
DF	(Ukraine)	77	Artem Nagirnyi	1	0	0	0	1 (1)	0 (0)
MF	(Hungary)	99	Milán Kovács	2	0	1	0	3 (2)	0 (0)
			TOTALS	27	2	1	0	28 (27)	2 (2)

=== Clean sheets ===
Last updated on 13 November 2022

Position	Nation	Number	Name	Nemzeti Bajnokság II	Hungarian Cup	Total
1	(Hungary)	51	András Hársfalvi	5	0	5
2	(Hungary)	12	Edvárd Rusák	1	0	1
3	(Hungary)	1	Barnabás Kecskés	0	0	0
			TOTALS	6	0	6
