= 2021–22 Gyirmót FC Győr season =

Gyirmót FC Győr
2021–22 season
- Chairman: Ernő Horváth
- Manager: Aurél Csertői
- Stadium: Ménfői úti Stadion
- Nemzeti Bajnokság I: 12th (relegated)
- Hungarian Cup: Round of 16
- Top goalscorer: League: Barnabás Varga (13); All: Barnabás Varga (13)
- Highest home attendance: 4,013 vs Ferencváros (30 October 2021); Nemzeti Bajnokság I
- Lowest home attendance: 785 vs Mezőkövesd (4 December 2021); Nemzeti Bajnokság I
- Average home league attendance: 1,620
- Biggest win: 3–0 vs MTK Budapest (A) (5 November 2021); Nemzeti Bajnokság I
- Biggest defeat: 0–5 vs Debrecen (A) (10 September 2021); Nemzeti Bajnokság I
| Home colours | Away colours |

The 2021–22 season was Gyirmót FC Győr's 2nd competitive season, 1st consecutive season in the OTP Bank Liga and 41st year in existence as a football club.

== Squad ==
As of 26 March 2022

Note: Flags indicate national team as defined under FIFA eligibility rules; some limited exceptions apply. Players may hold more than one non-FIFA nationality.

| No. | Pos. | Nation | Player |
|---|---|---|---|
| 1 | GK | HUN | Péter Iváncsics |
| 2 | MF | HUN | Vince Szegi |
| 4 | DF | ROU | Cornel Ene |
| 5 | DF | HUN | Dániel Karacs |
| 6 | MF | HUN | Márton Radics |
| 7 | MF | HUN | Bálint Vogyicska |
| 8 | MF | HUN | Patrik Nagy |
| 10 | MF | HUN | István Szatmári |
| 11 | FW | HUN | Kristóf Herjeczki |
| 12 | GK | HUN | Edvárd Rusák |
| 14 | DF | HUN | Imre Széles |
| 15 | DF | HUN | Martin Major |
| 17 | FW | HUN | András Simon |
| 18 | MF | HUN | Ádám Hajdú |
| 20 | MF | HUN | Dominik Kovács |
| 21 | MF | KOS | Florent Hasani |

| No. | Pos. | Nation | Player |
|---|---|---|---|
| 25 | FW | HUN | Barnabás Varga |
| 26 | FW | HUN | Bence Somogyi-Bakos |
| 27 | MF | HUN | András Csonka |
| 29 | FW | HUN | László Lencse |
| 30 | MF | HUN | Kristóf Nagy |
| 38 | MF | HUN | Ádám Vass |
| 39 | DF | SVK | Dávid Hudák |
| 50 | FW | HUN | Ádám Mayer |
| 51 | GK | HUN | András Hársfalvi |
| 55 | DF | CRO | Frane Ikić |
| 67 | DF | HUN | Viktor Csörgő |
| 70 | FW | HUN | Zoltán Medgyes |
| 77 | DF | HUN | Márió Zeke |
| 90 | DF | HUN | Patrik Lázár |
| 99 | DF | HUN | Henrik Kirják |
| — | FW | UKR | Denys Bezborodko on loan from Desna Chernihiv |

== Transfers ==
=== Summer ===
In: Note: Flags indicate national team as defined under FIFA eligibility rules; some limited exceptions apply. Players may hold more than one non-FIFA nationality.

| No. | Pos. | Nation | Player |
|---|---|---|---|
| 4 | DF | ROU | Cornel Ene (from Kisvárda) |
| 15 | DF | HUN | Martin Major (from Fehérvár II) |
| 20 | MF | HUN | Dominik Kovács (from Budapest Honvéd II) |
| 21 | MF | KOS | Florent Hasani (from (Israel) Hapoel Kfar Saba) |
| 27 | MF | HUN | András Csonka (loan from Ferencváros) |
| 55 | DF | CRO | Frane Ikić (from (Bosnia and Herzegovina) Željezničar Sarajevo) |
| 67 | DF | HUN | Viktor Csörgő (from Budapest Honvéd II) |
| 70 | MF | HUN | Zoltán Medgyes (from Szombathelyi Haladás) |
| 77 | DF | HUN | Márió Zeke (loan from Fehérvár) |
| — | GK | HUN | Péter Iváncsics (from Gyirmót U-19) |

Out: Note: Flags indicate national team as defined under FIFA eligibility rules; some limited exceptions apply. Players may hold more than one non-FIFA nationality.

| No. | Pos. | Nation | Player |
|---|---|---|---|
| 15 | DF | HUN | Martin Major (loan return to Fehérvár II) |
| 17 | MF | SVK | Dominik Sandal (to Pápa) |
| 21 | GK | HUN | Donát Pálfi (to Győr) |
| 22 | MF | HUN | Norbert Heffler (loan to Tiszakécske) |
| 23 | MF | HUN | Levente Lustyik (loan return to MTK Budapest II) |

=== Winter ===
In: Note: Flags indicate national team as defined under FIFA eligibility rules; some limited exceptions apply. Players may hold more than one non-FIFA nationality.

| No. | Pos. | Nation | Player |
|---|---|---|---|
| — | MF | SVK | Denis Ventúra (from (Romania) Academica Clinceni) |
| — | FW | CUW | Gino van Kessel (from (Sweden) Dalkurd) |
| — | MF | BLR | Vladislav Klimovich (from (Belarus) Dinamo Minsk) |
| — | FW | MKD | Matej Cvetanoski (from (North Macedonia) Shkupi) |
| — | FW | UKR | Denys Bezborodko (on loan from (Ukraine) Desna Chernihiv) |

Out: Note: Flags indicate national team as defined under FIFA eligibility rules; some limited exceptions apply. Players may hold more than one non-FIFA nationality.

| No. | Pos. | Nation | Player |
|---|---|---|---|
| 29 | FW | HUN | László Lencse (to Szombathelyi Haladás) |

== Competitions ==
=== Overview ===
| Competition | First match | Last match | Starting round | Final position | Record | | | | | | | |
| Competition | First match | Last match | Starting round | Final position | Pld | W | D | L | GF | GA | GD | Win % |
|---|---|---|---|---|---|---|---|---|---|---|---|---|
| Nemzeti Bajnokság I | 31 July 2021 | 14 May 2022 | Matchday 1 | 12th | 33 | 7 | 11 | 15 | 34 | 49 | −15 | 21.21 |
| Hungarian Cup | 19 September 2021 | 9 February 2022 | Round of 64 | Round of 16 | 3 | 1 | 1 | 1 | 2 | 3 | −1 | 33.33 |
| Total | | | | | 36 | 8 | 12 | 16 | 36 | 52 | −16 | 22.22 |

Source: Competitions

=== Nemzeti Bajnokság I ===
==== League table ====
| Pos | Team | Pld | W | D | L | GF | GA | GD | Pts | Qualification or relegation |
|---|---|---|---|---|---|---|---|---|---|---|
| 8 | Zalaegerszeg | 33 | 10 | 9 | 14 | 44 | 58 | −14 | 39 | |
| 9 | Honvéd | 33 | 10 | 8 | 15 | 48 | 51 | −3 | 38 | |
| 10 | Mezőkövesd | 33 | 10 | 8 | 15 | 37 | 49 | −12 | 38 | |
| 11 | MTK (R) | 33 | 9 | 9 | 15 | 28 | 50 | −22 | 36 | Relegation to the Nemzeti Bajnokság II |
| 12 | Gyirmót (R) | 33 | 7 | 11 | 15 | 34 | 49 | −15 | 32 | Relegation to the Nemzeti Bajnokság II |

Source: Hungarian Football Federation (in Hungarian), Soccerway
Rules for classification: 1) Points; 2) Matches won; 3) Goal difference; 4) Goals scored; 5) Head-to-head points; 6) Head-to-head goal difference; 7) Head-to-head away goals scored; 8) Fair play ranking; 9) Drawing of lots.
(R) Relegated

==== Results summary ====
| Overall | | | | | | | | Home | | | | | | Away | | | | | |
| Pld | W | D | L | GF | GA | GD | Pts | W | D | L | GF | GA | GD | W | D | L | GF | GA | GD |
|---|---|---|---|---|---|---|---|---|---|---|---|---|---|---|---|---|---|---|---|
| 33 | 7 | 11 | 15 | 34 | 49 | −15 | 32 | 2 | 8 | 7 | 15 | 23 | −8 | 5 | 3 | 8 | 19 | 26 | −7 |

Last updated: 15 May 2022.
Source: Soccerway

==== Results by round ====
| Round | 1 | 2 | 3 | 4 | 5 | 6 | 7 | 8 | 9 | 10 | 11 | 12 | 13 | 14 | 15 | 16 | 17 | 18 | 19 | 20 | 21 | 22 | 23 | 24 | 25 | 26 | 27 | 28 | 29 | 30 | 31 | 32 | 33 |
|---|---|---|---|---|---|---|---|---|---|---|---|---|---|---|---|---|---|---|---|---|---|---|---|---|---|---|---|---|---|---|---|---|---|
| Ground | H | A | H | A | H | A | H | A | H | A | H | A | H | A | H | A | H | A | H | A | H | A | H | A | H | A | H | A | H | A | H | A | H |
| Result | D | L | D | D | L | L | L | W | W | L | L | W | D | L | L | L | D | W | W | W | L | D | D | L | L | L | D | L | D | D | D | W | L |
| Position | 5 | 10 | 9 | 11 | 11 | 12 | 12 | 11 | 11 | 11 | 11 | 10 | 10 | 11 | 12 | 12 | 12 | 11 | 10 | 9 | 10 | 11 | 11 | 11 | 11 | 11 | 11 | 11 | 11 | 12 | 12 | 12 | 12 |

Updated to match(es) played on 15 May 2022. Source: Matches
A = Away; H = Home; W = Win; D = Draw; L = Loss

==== Matches ====
| 30 July 2021 1 | Gyirmót | 1–1 | MTK Budapest | Győr |
| 20:30 CEST | Ferreira 27' (o.g.) | Report | Miovski 54' | Stadium: Ménfői úti Stadion; Attendance: 1,200; Referee: Péter Zierkelbach |

| 6 August 2021 2 | Kisvárda | 2–1 | Gyirmót | Kisvárda |
| 20:00 CEST | Melnyk 31'; Bumba 56' | Report | Varga 36' | Stadium: Várkerti Stadion; Attendance: 2,022; Referee: Csaba Pintér |

| 14 August 2021 3 | Gyirmót | 1–1 | Fehérvár | Győr |
| 20:30 CEST | Varga 62' | Report | Petryak 30' | Stadium: Ménfői úti Stadion; Attendance: 1,822; Referee: Ferenc Karakó |

| 22 August 2021 4 | Mezőkövesd | 0–0 | Gyirmót | Mezőkövesd |
| 15:45 CEST | | Report | | Stadium: Városi Stadion; Attendance: 1,550; Referee: Gergő Bogár |

| 29 August 2021 5 | Gyirmót | 0–1 | Puskás Akadémia | Győr |
| 17:45 CEST | | Report | Nagy 63' | Stadium: Ménfői úti Stadion; Attendance: 2,086; Referee: Balázs Berke |

| 10 September 2021 6 | Debrecen | 5–0 | Gyirmót | Debrecen |
| 20:00 CEST | Bévárdi 47'; Ugrai 51', 77'; Sós 64', 66' | Report | | Stadium: Nagyerdei Stadion; Attendance: 3,089; Referee: Sándor Andó-Szabó |

| 25 September 2021 7 | Gyirmót | 2–4 | Budapest Honvéd | Győr |
| 20:00 CEST | Simon 15', 57' | Report | Tamás 12'; Nagy 21'; Lukić 25', 48' | Stadium: Ménfői úti Stadion; Attendance: 2,381; Referee: József Erdős |

| 2 October 2021 8 | Újpest | 1–3 | Gyirmót | Budapest |
| 14:45 CEST | Kastrati 52' | Report | Varga 11', 27' (pen.); Szegi 16' | Stadium: Szusza Ferenc Stadion; Attendance: 1,456; Referee: Balázs Berke |

| 16 October 2021 8 | Gyirmót | 2–1 | Paks | Győr |
| 14:45 CEST | Simon 24'; Hasani 68' | Report | Ádám 63' | Stadium: Ménfői úti Stadion; Attendance: 1,024; Referee: Sándor Andó-Szabó |

| 22 October 2021 10 | Zalaegerszeg | 2–1 | Gyirmót | Zalaegerszeg |
| 15:00 CEST | Koszta 3'; Serafimov 35' | Report | Szegi 45' | Stadium: ZTE Arena; Attendance: 728; Referee: Péter Antal |

| 30 October 2021 11 | Gyirmót | 0–2 | Ferencváros | Győr |
| 19:30 CEST | | Report | Uzuni 47'; Nguen 85' | Stadium: Ménfői úti Stadion; Attendance: 4,013; Referee: Csaba Pintér |

| 5 November 2021 12 | MTK Budapest | 0–3 | Gyirmót | Budapest |
| 20:00 CET | | Report | Szegi 41'; Simon 59'; Csonka 74' | Stadium: Hidegkuti Nándor Stadion; Attendance: 1,545; Referee: Ádám Pillók |

| 20 November 2021 13 | Gyirmót | 1–1 | Kisvárda | Győr |
| 17:00 CET | Ikić 90+2' | Report | Bumba 11' (pen.) | Stadium: Ménfői úti Stadion; Attendance: 864; Referee: Mihály Káprály |

| 27 November 2021 14 | Fehérvár | 3–2 | Gyirmót | Székesfehérvár |
| 17:00 CET | Nikolić 10' (pen.); Kodro 49' (pen.), 84' | Report | Varga 38' (pen.), 90+3' | Stadium: MOL Aréna Sóstó; Attendance: 1,206; Referee: Ádám Farkas |

| 4 December 2021 15 | Gyirmót | 0–1 | Mezőkövesd | Győr |
| 13:00 CET | | Report | Pillár 47' | Stadium: Ménfői úti Stadion; Attendance: 785; Referee: István Vad |

| 11 December 2021 16 | Puskás Akadémia | 3–0 | Gyirmót | Felcsút |
| 15:45 CET | Slagveer 53', 80'; Corbu 65' | Report | | Stadium: Pancho Aréna; Attendance: 586; Referee: Péter Antal |

| 19 December 2021 17 | Gyirmót | 0–0 | Debrecen | Győr |
| 16:30 CET | | Report | | Stadium: Ménfői úti Stadion; Attendance: 811; Referee: József Erdős |

| 29 January 2022 18 | Budapest Honvéd | 0–1 | Gyirmót | Bozsik Stadion |
| 19:30 CET | | Report | Varga 70' (pen.) | Stadium: Budapest; Attendance: 1,880; Referee: Ádám Farkas |

| 5 February 2022 19 | Gyirmót | 1–0 | Újpest | Győr |
| 17:00 CET | Varga 64' (pen.) | Report | | Stadium: Ménfői úti Stadion; Attendance: 1,420; Referee: Bence Csonka |

| 12 February 2022 20 | Paks | 2–3 | Gyirmót | Fehérvári úti Stadion |
| 14:45 CET | Ádám 39', 72' | Report | Varga 17' (pen.), 25'; Ventúra 82' | Stadium: Paks; Attendance: 1,398; Referee: István Vad |

| 19 February 2022 21 | Gyirmót | 0–1 | Zalaegerszeg | Győr |
| 17:00 CET | | Report | Koszta 18' | Stadium: Ménfői úti Stadion; Attendance: 1,053; Referee: Ádám Pillók |

| 26 February 2022 22 | Ferencváros | 1–1 | Gyirmót | Budapest |
| 19:30 CET | Bassey 45' | Report | Mak 26' (o.g.) | Stadium: Groupama Arena; Attendance: 5,887; Referee: Tamás Bognár |

| 4 March 2022 23 | Gyirmót | 1–1 | MTK Budapest | Győr |
| 20:00 CET | Szegi 42' | Report | Kovácsréti 86' | Stadium: Ménfői úti Stadion; Attendance: 972; Referee: Gergő Bogár |

| 13 March 2022 24 | Kisvárda | 1–0 | Gyirmót | Kisvárda |
| 14:30 CET | Mešanović 45' | Report | | Stadium: Várkerti Stadion; Attendance: 2,120; Referee: Péter Antal |

| 19 March 2022 25 | Gyirmót | 0–2 | Fehérvár | Győr |
| 17:30 CET | | Report | Nikolić 2', 30' | Stadium: Ménfői úti Stadion; Attendance: 1,844; Referee: Ferenc Karakó |

| 1 April 2022 26 | Mezőkövesd | 1–0 | Gyirmót | Mezőkövesd |
| 20:00 CEST | Jurina 20' | Report | Zeke (red card) 63' | Stadium: Városi Stadion; Attendance: 688; Referee: Csaba Pintér |

| 9 April 2022 27 | Gyirmót | 1–1 | Puskás Akadémia | Győr |
| 17:00 CEST | Ikić 16' | Report | Băluță 82' | Stadium: Ménfői úti Stadion; Attendance: 1,012; Referee: Péter Zierkelbach |

| 15 April 2022 28 | Debrecen | 3–1 | Gyirmót | Debrecen |
| 20:00 CEST | Baráth 3', 24'; Do. Babunski 86' | Report | Hasani 9' | Stadium: Nagyerdei Stadion; Attendance: 3,621; Referee: József Erdős |

| 24 April 2022 29 | Gyirmót | 1–1 | Budapest Honvéd | Győr |
| 19:30 CEST | Hasani 28' | Report | Bőle 21' | Stadium: Ménfői úti Stadion; Attendance: 1,462; Referee: István Vad |

| 1 May 2022 30 | Újpest | 2–2 | Gyirmót | Budapest |
| 17:00 CEST | Mitrović 47'; Onovo 84' | Report | Nagy 14'; Ventúra 90' | Stadium: Szusza Ferenc Stadion; Attendance: 3,441; Referee: Gergő Bogár |

| 4 May 2022 31 | Gyirmót | 3–3 | Paks | Győr |
| 16:30 CEST (UTC+2) | Varga 70', (yellow card) 77'; Széles (yellow card) 70'; Radics (yellow card) 76'; Bezborodko (yellow card) 79'; Kovács 82'; Ventúra 90+2' | Report | J. Szabó (yellow card) 18'; Medgyes 31'; Ádám 39', 51' | Stadium: Ménfői úti Stadion; Attendance: 978; Referee: Sándor Andó-Szabó |

| 8 May 2022 32 | Zalaegerszeg | 0–1 | Gyirmót | Zalaegerszeg |
| 16:15 CEST | | Report | Varga 47' | Stadium: ZTE Arena; Attendance: 1,902; Referee: József Erdős |

| 14 May 2022 33 | Gyirmót | 1–2 | Ferencváros | Győr |
| 14:45 CEST | Varga 57' | Report | Bassey 46'; Ćivić 78' | Stadium: Ménfői úti Stadion; Attendance: 2,628; Referee: Péter Zierkelbach |

=== Hungarian Cup ===
| 19 September 2021 Round of 64 | Ajka | 0–1 | Gyirmót | Ajka |
| 17:00 CEST | | Report | Medgyes 26' | Stadium: Városi Stadion; Attendance: 1,000; Referee: Gábor Barna |

| 27 October 2021 Round of 32 | Szombathelyi Haladás | 0–0 (a.e.t.) (2–3 p) | Gyirmót | Szombathely |
| 18:00 CEST | | Report | | Stadium: Haladás Sportkomplexum; Attendance: 1,310; Referee: Zoltán J. Kovács |
| | Penalties |
| | Holdampf (penalty scored); Romić (penalty scored); Németh (penalty missed); Hegedűs (penalty missed); Monori (penalty missed) | | Hasani (penalty scored); Nagy (penalty scored); Simon (penalty missed); Hajdú (penalty missed); Szegi (penalty scored) |

| 9 February 2022 Round of 16 | Békéscsaba | 3–1 | Gyirmót | Békéscsaba |
| 17:00 CET | Ilyés 51'; Gránicz 54'; Hodonicki 89' | Report | Ventúra 68' | Stadium: Kórház utcai Stadion; Attendance: 1,060; Referee: Péter Antal |

=== Appearances and goals ===
Last updated on 15 May 2022.

| No. | Pos | Nat | Player | Total | | OTP Bank Liga | | Hungarian Cup | |
| No. | Pos | Nat | Player | Apps | Goals | Apps | Goals | Apps | Goals |
|---|---|---|---|---|---|---|---|---|---|
| 2 | MF | (Hungary) HUN | Vince Szegi | 28 | 4 | 25 | 4 | 3 | 0 |
| 4 | DF | (Romania) ROU | Cornel Ene | 8 | 0 | 8 | 0 | 0 | 0 |
| 5 | DF | (Hungary) HUN | Dániel Karacs | 10 | 0 | 7 | 0 | 3 | 0 |
| 6 | MF | (Hungary) HUN | Márton Radics | 29 | 0 | 27 | 0 | 2 | 0 |
| 7 | MF | (Hungary) HUN | Bálint Vogyicska | 5 | 0 | 3 | 0 | 2 | 0 |
| 8 | MF | (Hungary) HUN | Patrik Nagy | 35 | 1 | 32 | 1 | 3 | 0 |
| 9 | FW | (Curaçao) CUW | Gino van Kessel | 4 | 0 | 3 | 0 | 1 | 0 |
| 10 | MF | (Hungary) HUN | István Szatmári | 0 | 0 | 0 | 0 | 0 | 0 |
| 11 | FW | (Hungary) HUN | Kristóf Herjeczki | 21 | 0 | 19 | 0 | 2 | 0 |
| 12 | GK | (Hungary) HUN | Edvárd Rusák | 20 | -30 | 18 | -30 | 2 | -0 |
| 14 | DF | (Hungary) HUN | Imre Széles | 21 | 0 | 20 | 0 | 1 | 0 |
| 15 | DF | (Hungary) HUN | Martin Major | 18 | 0 | 16 | 0 | 2 | 0 |
| 17 | FW | (Hungary) HUN | András Simon | 31 | 4 | 29 | 4 | 2 | 0 |
| 18 | MF | (Hungary) HUN | Ádám Hajdú | 33 | 0 | 31 | 0 | 2 | 0 |
| 19 | MF | (Slovakia) SVK | Denis Ventúra | 13 | 4 | 12 | 3 | 1 | 1 |
| 20 | MF | (Hungary) HUN | Dominik Kovács | 6 | 1 | 5 | 1 | 1 | 0 |
| 21 | MF | (Kosovo) KOS | Florent Hasani | 35 | 3 | 32 | 3 | 3 | 0 |
| 22 | MF | (Belarus) BLR | Vladislav Klimovich | 14 | 0 | 14 | 0 | 0 | 0 |
| 23 | FW | (North Macedonia) MKD | Matej Cvetanoski | 10 | 0 | 10 | 0 | 0 | 0 |
| 25 | FW | (Hungary) HUN | Barnabás Varga | 31 | 13 | 29 | 13 | 2 | 0 |
| 27 | MF | (Hungary) HUN | András Csonka | 12 | 1 | 10 | 1 | 2 | 0 |
| 38 | MF | (Hungary) HUN | Ádám Vass | 30 | 0 | 29 | 0 | 1 | 0 |
| 39 | DF | (Slovakia) SVK | Dávid Hudák | 0 | 0 | 0 | 0 | 0 | 0 |
| 50 | FW | (Hungary) HUN | Ádám Mayer | 6 | 0 | 4 | 0 | 2 | 0 |
| 51 | GK | (Hungary) HUN | András Hársfalvi | 16 | -22 | 15 | -19 | 1 | -3 |
| 55 | DF | (Croatia) CRO | Frane Ikić | 18 | 2 | 16 | 2 | 2 | 0 |
| 67 | DF | (Hungary) HUN | Viktor Csörgő | 13 | 0 | 13 | 0 | 0 | 0 |
| 70 | MF | (Hungary) HUN | Zoltán Medgyes | 32 | 1 | 29 | 0 | 3 | 1 |
| 77 | DF | (Hungary) HUN | Márió Zeke | 28 | 0 | 26 | 0 | 2 | 0 |
| 80 | FW | (Ukraine) UKR | Denys Bezborodko | 3 | 0 | 3 | 0 | 0 | 0 |
Youth players:
| 57 | GK | (Hungary) HUN | Barnabás Kecskés | 0 | 0 | 0 | -0 | 0 | -0 |
| 90 | DF | (Hungary) HUN | Patrik Lázár | 0 | 0 | 0 | 0 | 0 | 0 |
| 99 | DF | (Hungary) HUN | Henrik Kirják | 1 | 0 | 0 | 0 | 1 | 0 |
Out to loan:
| 22 | MF | (Hungary) HUN | Norbert Heffler | 1 | 0 | 1 | 0 | 0 | 0 |
Players no longer at the club:
| 29 | FW | (Hungary) HUN | László Lencse | 14 | 0 | 12 | 0 | 2 | 0 |

=== Top scorers ===
Includes all competitive matches. The list is sorted by shirt number when total goals are equal.

Last updated on 15 May 2022

| Position | Nation | Number | Name | OTP Bank Liga | Hungarian Cup | Total |
|---|---|---|---|---|---|---|
| 1 | (Hungary) | 25 | Barnabás Varga | 13 | 0 | 13 |
| 2 | (Hungary) | 17 | András Simon | 4 | 0 | 4 |
| 3 | (Hungary) | 2 | Vince Szegi | 4 | 0 | 4 |
| 4 | (Slovakia) | 19 | Denis Ventúra | 3 | 1 | 4 |
| 5 | (Kosovo) | 21 | Florent Hasani | 3 | 0 | 3 |
| 6 | (Croatia) | 55 | Frane Ikić | 2 | 0 | 2 |
| 7 | (Hungary) | 27 | András Csonka | 1 | 0 | 1 |
| 8 | (Hungary) | 8 | Patrik Nagy | 1 | 0 | 1 |
| 9 | (Hungary) | 20 | Dominik Kovács | 1 | 0 | 1 |
| 10 | (Hungary) | 70 | Zoltán Medgyes | 0 | 1 | 1 |
| / | / | / | Own Goals | 2 | 0 | 2 |
| | | | TOTALS | 34 | 2 | 36 |

=== Disciplinary record ===
Includes all competitive matches. Players with 1 card or more included only.

Last updated on 15 May 2022

| Position | Nation | Number | Name | OTP Bank Liga | | Hungarian Cup | | Total (Hu Total) | |
| Position | Nation | Number | Name | Yellow card | Red card | Yellow card | Red card | Yellow card | Red card |
| MF | (Hungary) | 2 | Vince Szegi | 11 | 1 | 0 | 0 | 11 (11) | 1 (1) |
| DF | (Romania) | 4 | Cornel Ene | 1 | 0 | 0 | 0 | 1 (1) | 0 (0) |
| DF | (Hungary) | 5 | Dániel Karacs | 1 | 0 | 2 | 0 | 3 (1) | 0 (0) |
| MF | (Hungary) | 6 | Márton Radics | 6 | 0 | 1 | 0 | 7 (6) | 0 (0) |
| MF | (Hungary) | 8 | Patrik Nagy | 5 | 0 | 1 | 0 | 6 (5) | 0 (0) |
| GK | (Hungary) | 12 | Edvárd Rusák | 1 | 0 | 0 | 0 | 1 (1) | 0 (0) |
| DF | (Hungary) | 14 | Imre Széles | 4 | 0 | 0 | 0 | 4 (4) | 0 (0) |
| DF | (Hungary) | 15 | Martin Major | 3 | 0 | 0 | 0 | 3 (3) | 0 (0) |
| FW | (Hungary) | 17 | András Simon | 3 | 0 | 0 | 0 | 3 (3) | 0 (0) |
| MF | (Hungary) | 18 | Ádám Hajdú | 3 | 0 | 1 | 0 | 4 (3) | 0 (0) |
| MF | (Slovakia) | 19 | Denis Ventúra | 2 | 0 | 0 | 0 | 2 (2) | 0 (0) |
| MF | (Kosovo) | 21 | Florent Hasani | 5 | 0 | 1 | 0 | 6 (5) | 0 (0) |
| MF | (Belarus) | 22 | Vladislav Klimovich | 3 | 0 | 0 | 0 | 3 (3) | 0 (0) |
| FW | (Hungary) | 25 | Barnabás Varga | 8 | 0 | 0 | 0 | 8 (8) | 0 (0) |
| MF | (Hungary) | 27 | András Csonka | 3 | 0 | 0 | 0 | 3 (3) | 0 (0) |
| FW | (Hungary) | 29 | László Lencse | 1 | 0 | 1 | 0 | 2 (1) | 0 (0) |
| MF | (Hungary) | 38 | Ádám Vass | 1 | 0 | 0 | 0 | 1 (1) | 0 (0) |
| FW | (Hungary) | 50 | Ádám Mayer | 1 | 0 | 0 | 0 | 1 (1) | 0 (0) |
| GK | (Hungary) | 51 | András Hársfalvi | 2 | 0 | 0 | 0 | 2 (2) | 0 (0) |
| DF | (Croatia) | 55 | Frane Ikić | 2 | 0 | 0 | 0 | 2 (2) | 0 (0) |
| DF | (Hungary) | 67 | Viktor Csörgő | 2 | 0 | 0 | 0 | 2 (2) | 0 (0) |
| MF | (Hungary) | 70 | Zoltán Medgyes | 2 | 0 | 1 | 0 | 3 (2) | 0 (0) |
| DF | (Hungary) | 77 | Márió Zeke | 8 | 1 | 0 | 0 | 8 (8) | 1 (1) |
| FW | (Ukraine) | 80 | Denys Bezborodko | 1 | 0 | 0 | 0 | 1 (1) | 0 (0) |
| | | | TOTALS | 80 | 2 | 8 | 0 | 88 (80) | 2 (2) |

=== Clean sheets ===
Last updated on 15 May 2022

| Position | Nation | Number | Name | OTP Bank Liga | Hungarian Cup | Total |
|---|---|---|---|---|---|---|
| 1 | (Hungary) | 12 | Edvárd Rusák | 3 | 2 | 5 |
| 2 | (Hungary) | 51 | András Hársfalvi | 3 | 0 | 3 |
| 3 | (Hungary) | 57 | Barnabás Kecskés | 0 | 0 | 0 |
| | | | TOTALS | 6 | 2 | 8 |
