= Márk Madarász =

Hungarian footballer (born 1995)

Personal information
- Date of birth: 24 November 1995 (age 30)
- Place of birth: Mosonmagyaróvár, Hungary
- Height: 1.76 m (5 ft 9 in)
- Position: Midfielder

Team information
- Current team: Gyirmót
- Number: 95

Youth career
- 2003–2011: Jánossomorja
- 2011–2013: Gyirmót

Senior career*
Years	Team	Apps	(Gls)
2013–2017	Gyirmót	94	(11)
2016–2017	Gyirmót II	12	(4)
2017–2021	Puskás Akadémia	2	(0)
2017–2018	Puskás Akadémia II	10	(2)
2018–2019	→ Zalaegerszeg (loan)	21	(3)
2019	→ Győr (loan)	14	(3)
2019–2021	→ Csákvár (loan)	60	(17)
2021–2023	Mezőkövesd	29	(2)
2023–	Gyirmót	82	(17)

International career^{‡}
2016	Hungary U21	3	(0)
- * Club domestic league appearances and goals as of 23 August 2025 ‡ National team caps and goals as of 10 October 2016

Márk Madarász (born 24 November 1995) is a Hungarian professional footballer, who plays as a midfielder for Nemzeti Bajnokság III club Gyirmót. He represented Hungary at youth level.

== Career ==
In June 2021, he signed with Nemzeti Bajnokság I club Mezőkövesd.

On 17 January 2023, following lack of playing time at Mezőkövesd, Madarász returned to Gyirmót, competing in Nemzeti Bajnokság II.

== Career statistics ==
As of match played 23 August 2025

Appearances and goals by club, season and competition
Club	Season	League			Magyar Kupa		Ligakupa		Other		Total	
Club	Season	Division	Apps	Goals	Apps	Goals	Apps	Goals	Apps	Goals	Apps	Goals
Gyirmót	2013–14	Nemzeti Bajnokság II	15	2	2	0	4	0	—		21	2
Gyirmót	2014–15	Nemzeti Bajnokság II	26	7	3	1	1	0	—		30	8
Gyirmót	2015–16	Nemzeti Bajnokság II	26	1	2	0	—		—		28	1
Gyirmót	2016–17	Nemzeti Bajnokság I	27	1	4	1	—		—		31	2
Gyirmót	Total		94	11	11	2	5	0	—		110	13
Gyirmót II	2015–16	Megyei Bajnokság I	3	2	—		—		2 (Note: Appearances in Megyei Bajnokság I promotion play-offs)	3	5	5
Gyirmót II	2016–17	Nemzeti Bajnokság III	9	2	—		—		—		9	2
Gyirmót II	Total		12	4	—		—		2	3	14	7
Puskás Akadémia	2017–18	Nemzeti Bajnokság I	2	0	5	1	—		—		7	1
Puskás Akadémia II	2017–18	Nemzeti Bajnokság III	10	2	—		—		—		10	2
Zalaegerszeg (loan)	2018–19	Nemzeti Bajnokság II	21	3	1	0	—		—		22	3
Győr (loan)	2018–19	Nemzeti Bajnokság II	14	3	—		—		—		14	3
Csákvár (loan)	2019–20	Nemzeti Bajnokság II	24	3	1	0	—		—		25	3
Csákvár (loan)	2020–21	Nemzeti Bajnokság II	36	14	3	3	—		—		39	17
Csákvár (loan)	Total		60	17	4	3	—		—		64	20
Mezőkövesd	2021–22	Nemzeti Bajnokság I	23	1	2	0	—		—		25	1
Mezőkövesd	2022–23	Nemzeti Bajnokság I	6	1	—		—		—		6	1
Mezőkövesd	Total		29	2	2	0	—		—		31	2
Gyirmót	2022–23	Nemzeti Bajnokság II	18	3	—		—		—		18	3
Gyirmót	2023–24	Nemzeti Bajnokság II	31	9	2	0	—		—		33	9
Gyirmót	2024–25	Nemzeti Bajnokság II	29	4	3	1	—		—		32	5
Gyirmót	2025–26	Nemzeti Bajnokság III	4	1	2	0	—		—		6	1
Gyirmót	Total		82	17	7	1	—		—		89	18
Career total			324	59	30	7	5	0	2	3	361	69

== Honours ==
Gyirmót

- Nemzeti Bajnokság II: 2015–16

Gyirmót II

- Megyei Bajnokság I – Győr–Moson–Sopron: 2015–16

Puskás Akadémia

- Magyar Kupa runner-up: 2017–18

Zalaegerszeg

- Nemzeti Bajnokság II: 2018–19
