= 2023–24 Nemzeti Bajnokság II =

Nemzeti Bajnokság II
- Season: 2023–24
- Dates: 30 July 2023 – 26 May 2024
- Champions: Nyíregyháza
- Promoted: Nyíregyháza; Győr
- Relegated: Haladás; Mosonmagyaróvár; Pécs; Siófok; Tiszakécske
- Matches: 306
- Goals: 733 (2.4 per match)
- Top goalscorer: György Kirchner, Milán Tóth (18 goals each)

The 2023–24 Nemzeti Bajnokság II (also known as 2023–24 Merkantil Bank Liga for sponsorship reasons) is Hungary's 126th season of the Nemzeti Bajnokság II, the second tier of the Hungarian football league system.

== Overview ==
After the reduction from 20 teams, this will be the first and last season with 18 teams as for 2023–24, the league will transform to 16 teams from 2024 to 2025.

== Teams ==
The following teams have changed division since the 2022–23 season.

=== Changes ===
==== To NB II ====
| Relegated from 2022–23 Nemzeti Bajnokság I | Promoted from 2022–23 Nemzeti Bajnokság III |
|---|---|
| ▼ Honvéd ▼ Vasas | ▲BVSC-Zugló (East) |

==== From NB II ====
| Promoted to 2023–24 Nemzeti Bajnokság I | Relegated to 2023–24 Nemzeti Bajnokság III |
|---|---|
| ▲ Diósgyőr ▲MTK Budapest | ▼ Szentlőrinc ▼ Békéscsaba ▼ Dorog |

BVSC-Zugló play in NB II for the first time in history since 2003–04.

=== Stadium and locations ===
Note: Table lists in alphabetical order.

Location of teams in 2023–24 Nemzeti Bajnokság II
Location of the teams in Budapest.

| Team | Location | Stadium | Capacity | 2022–23 |
|---|---|---|---|---|
| Ajka | Ajka | Városi Stadion | 5,000 | 3rd |
| Budafok | Budapest (Budafok) | Promontor utcai Stadion | 4,000 | 10th |
| Honvéd | Budapest (Kispest) | Bozsik Aréna | 8,000 | 11th (NB I) |
| BVSC-Zugló | Budapest (Zugló) | Szőnyi úti Stadion | 12,000 | 1st (NB III, East) |
| Csákvár | Csákvár | Tersztyánszky Ödön Stadion | 2,020 | 15th |
| Gyirmót | Győr (Gyirmót) | Alcufer Stadion | 4,728 | 6th |
| Győr | Győr (Gyárváros) | ETO Park | 15,600 | 13th |
| Kazincbarcika | Kazincbarcika | Kolorcity Aréna | 1,080 | 14th |
| Kozármisleny | Kozármisleny | Kozármislenyi Stadion | 2,000 | 16th |
| Mosonmagyaróvár | Mosonmagyaróvár | Wittmann Antal park | 4,000 | 12th |
| Nyíregyháza | Balmazújváros | Városi Sportpálya (Note: Nyíregyháza play their home games at Balmazújvárosi Városi Sportpálya until spring 2024 due to the rebuilding of their own stadium.) | 3,385 | 18th |
| Pécs | Pécs | Stadion PMFC | 7,000 | 7th |
| Siófok | Siófok | Révész Géza utcai Stadion | 6,500 | 8th |
| Soroksár | Budapest (Soroksár) | Szamosi Mihály Sportelep | 5,000 | 5th |
| Szeged | Szeged | Szent Gellért Fórum | 8,136 | 4th |
| Haladás | Szombathely | Haladás Sportkomplexum | 8,940 | 9th |
| Tiszakécske | Tiszakécske | Városi Stadion | 4,500 | 11th |
| Vasas | Budapest (Angyalföld) | Illovszky Rudolf Stadion | 5,154 | 12th (NB I) |

=== Personnel and kits ===
Hungarian national sports betting brand Tippmix sponsored all 18 teams of the second league since February 2019, their logo were present on all team kits.

Note: Flags indicate national team as has been defined under FIFA eligibility rules. Players and Managers may hold more than one non-FIFA nationality.

| Team | Head coach | Captain | Kit manufacturer | Additional shirt sponsor |
|---|---|---|---|---|
| Ajka | (Hungary) Szabolcs Schindler | (Hungary) Richárd Zsolnai | Puma | Bakony Erőmű |
| Budafok | (Hungary) László Dajka | (Hungary) Dávid Kovács | 2Rule | Zakariás Alapítvány |
| Honvéd | (Hungary) Aurél Csertői | (Croatia) (Hungary) Ivan Lovrić | Macron | None |
| BVSC-Zugló | (Hungary) Ádám Kincses | (Hungary) József Nagy | Adidas | None |
| Csákvár | (Hungary) Balázs Tóth | | 2Rule | Aqvital |
| Gyirmót | (Hungary) Zsolt Tamási | (Slovakia) Dávid Hudák | Jako | Alcufer |
| Győr | (Slovakia) (Hungary) Balázs Borbély | (Hungary) Krisztián Keresztes | Adidas | Kukkonia |
| Kazincbarcika | (Hungary) József Csábi | (Romania) (Hungary) Valter Heil | Puma | GreenPlan |
| Kozármisleny | (Hungary) Zoltán Aczél | (Hungary) Gergő Gajág | Macron | HR-Rent |
| Mosonmagyaróvár | (Hungary) Ádám Nagy | (Hungary) Márk Heinrich | Jako | Credo |
| Nyíregyháza | (Hungary) Krisztián Timár | (Hungary) Ákos Baki | Macron | Révész |
| Pécs | (Hungary) János Mátyus | (Hungary) László Rácz | Adidas | None |
| Siófok | (Hungary) Gyula Jeney | (Hungary) Gábor Polényi | Nike | HunGast |
| Soroksár | (Hungary) Péter Lipcsei | (Hungary) Balázs Lovrencsics | Nike | Provident |
| Szeged | (Slovenia) Bekim Kapić | (Hungary) Molnár F. Tamás | Foreleven11 | None |
| Haladás | (Serbia) (Hungary) Predrag Bošnjak | (Hungary) Barnabás Rácz | Adidas | Endo-Plus-Service |
| Tiszakécske | (Hungary) Pál Balogh | (Romania) (Hungary) Carlo Erdei | 2Rule | Duna Aszfalt |
| Vasas | (Hungary) Zoltán Gera | (Hungary) Zsombor Berecz | Adidas | OTP Bank |

=== Managerial changes ===
| Team | Outgoing manager | Manner of departure | Date of vacancy | Position in table | Incoming manager | Date of appointment |
|---|---|---|---|---|---|---|
| Gyirmót | (Hungary) Aurél Csertői | End of contract | 21 May 2023 | Pre-season | (Hungary) Csaba Csizmadia | 27 May 2023 |
| Tiszakécske | (Hungary) László Klausz | End of contract | 21 May 2023 | Pre-season | (Hungary) László Vas | 16 June 2023 |
| Honvéd | (Croatia) Dean Klafurić | Sacked | 28 May 2023 | Pre-season | (Hungary) Máté Pintezits | 16 June 2023 |
| Haladás | (Slovakia) Michal Hipp | End of contract | 31 May 2023 | Pre-season | (Serbia) Aleksandar Jović | 12 June 2023 |
| Mosonmagyaróvár | (Hungary) József Király | End of interim spell | 1 June 2023 | Pre-season | (Hungary) Zoltán Németh | 1 June 2023 |
| Budafok | (Hungary) János Mátyus | End of contract | 1 June 2023 | Pre-season | (Hungary) Gábor Erős | 6 June 2023 |
| Kozármisleny | (Hungary) Gábor Márton | End of contract | 9 June 2023 | Pre-season | (Hungary) Zoltán Aczél | 9 June 2023 |
| Nyíregyháza | (Hungary) Tivadar Fekete | End of interim spell | 16 June 2023 | Pre-season | (Hungary) Krisztián Tímár | 16 June 2023 |
| Mosonmagyaróvár | (Hungary) Zoltán Németh | Sacked | 17 August 2023 | 18th | (Hungary) József Király | 1 June 2023 |
| BVSC-Zugló | (Hungary) Flórián Urbán | Sacked | 5 September 2023 | 16th | (Hungary) Ádám Kincses^{i} | |
| Gyirmót | (Hungary) Csaba Csizmadia | Sacked | 25 September 2023 | 17th | (Hungary) Zsolt Tamási | 25 September 2023 |
| Ajka | (Hungary) Gyula Jeney | Sacked | 27 September 2023 | 17th | (Hungary) Szabolcs Schindler | 1 October 2023 |
| Pécs | (Hungary) Ádám Weitner | Sacked | 29 September 2023 | 8th | (Hungary) Zsolt Németh | 29 September 2023 |
| Honvéd | (Hungary) Máté Pinezits | Mutual consent | 31 October 2023 | 11th | (Bosnia and Herzegovina) (Hungary) Đorđe Kamber^{i} | 31 October 2023 |
| Tiszakécske | (Hungary) László Vas | Resigned | 6 November 2023 | 15th | (Hungary) Gábor Toldi^{i} | 6 November 2023 |
| Honvéd | (Bosnia and Herzegovina) (Hungary) Đorđe Kamber | End of interim spell | 9 November 2023 | 13th | (Hungary) Aurél Csertői | 9 November 2023 |
| BVSC-Zugló | (Hungary) Ádám Kincses | End of interim spell | 30 November 2023 | 14th | (Hungary) Tamás Szekeres | 30 November 2023 |
| Tiszakécske | (Hungary) Gábor Toldi | End of interim spell | 19 December 2023 | 15th | (Hungary) Károly Kis | 19 December 2023 |
| Mosonmagyaróvár | (Hungary) József Király | End of interim spell | 19 December 2023 | 18th | (Hungary) Ádám Nagy | 19 December 2023 |
| Budafok | (Hungary) Gábor Erős | Mutual consent | 18 February 2024 | 14th | (Hungary) László Dajka | 20 February 2024 |
| Pécs | (Hungary) Árpád Kulcsár | Mutual consent | 20 February 2024 | 10th | (Hungary) János Mátyus | 21 February 2024 |
| Győr | (Spain) Antonio Muñoz | Sacked | 24 February 2024 | 2nd | (Ukraine) (Hungary) Serhiy Kuznetsov | 24 February 2024 |
| Vasas | (Hungary) Szilárd Desits | Sacked | 26 February 2024 | 3rd | (Hungary) Zoltán Gera | 26 February 2024 |
| Tiszakécske | (Hungary) Károly Kis | Sacked | 28 March 2024 | 17th | (Hungary) Pál Balogh^{i} | 28 March 2024 |
| Siófok | (Serbia) (Hungary) Dragan Vukmir | Mutual consent | 15 April 2024 | 16th | (Hungary) Gyula Jeney | 15 April 2024 |
| BVSC-Zugló | (Hungary) Tamás Szekeres | Resigned | 22 April 2024 | 14th | (Hungary) Ádám Kincses^{i} | 22 April 2024 |
| Győr | (Ukraine) (Hungary) Serhiy Kuznetsov | Sacked | 24 April 2024 | 3rd | (Slovakia) (Hungary) Balázs Borbély | 24 April 2024 |
| Haladás | (Serbia) Aleksandar Jović | Resigned | 7 May 2024 | 13th | (Serbia) (Hungary) Predrag Bošnjak^{i} | 7 May 2024 |
| Szeged | (Serbia) Aleksandar Stevanović | Mutual consent | 13 May 2024 | 4th | (Slovenia) Bekim Kapić | 13 May 2024 |

== League table ==
| Pos | Team | Pld | W | D | L | GF | GA | GD | Pts | Promotion or relegation |
|---|---|---|---|---|---|---|---|---|---|---|
| 1 | Nyíregyháza (C, P) | 34 | 24 | 7 | 3 | 69 | 27 | +42 | 79 | Promotion to Nemzeti Bajnokság I |
| 2 | Győr (P) | 34 | 22 | 3 | 9 | 65 | 37 | +28 | 69 | Promotion to Nemzeti Bajnokság I |
| 3 | Vasas | 34 | 19 | 10 | 5 | 72 | 33 | +39 | 67 | |
| 4 | Szeged | 34 | 15 | 15 | 4 | 35 | 23 | +12 | 60 | |
| 5 | Kozármisleny | 34 | 15 | 7 | 12 | 55 | 45 | +10 | 52 | |
| 6 | Gyirmót | 34 | 12 | 13 | 9 | 49 | 45 | +4 | 49 | |
| 7 | Soroksár | 34 | 12 | 9 | 13 | 39 | 44 | −5 | 45 | |
| 8 | Ajka | 34 | 13 | 4 | 17 | 30 | 33 | −3 | 43 | |
| 9 | Csákvár | 34 | 12 | 7 | 15 | 39 | 45 | −6 | 43 | |
| 10 | Budafok | 34 | 12 | 8 | 14 | 37 | 44 | −7 | 44 | |
| 11 | Honvéd | 34 | 11 | 11 | 12 | 39 | 36 | +3 | 44 | |
| 12 | Kazincbarcika | 34 | 11 | 11 | 12 | 37 | 41 | −4 | 44 | |
| 13 | BVSC-Zugló | 34 | 10 | 8 | 16 | 27 | 40 | −13 | 38 | |
| 14 | Haladás (R) | 34 | 9 | 11 | 14 | 42 | 52 | −10 | 38 | Dissolved |
| 15 | Pécs (R) | 34 | 8 | 12 | 14 | 20 | 39 | −19 | 36 | Relegation to Nemzeti Bajnokság III |
| 16 | Tiszakécske (R) | 34 | 7 | 13 | 14 | 33 | 40 | −7 | 34 | Relegation to Nemzeti Bajnokság III |
| 17 | Siófok (R) | 34 | 8 | 7 | 19 | 36 | 60 | −24 | 31 | Relegation to Nemzeti Bajnokság III |
| 18 | Mosonmagyaróvár (R) | 34 | 5 | 6 | 23 | 29 | 69 | −40 | 21 | Relegation to Nemzeti Bajnokság III |

Updated to match(es) played on 20 May 2024. Source: Hungarian Football Federation (in Hungarian), Soccerway
Rules for classification: 1) Points; 2) Matches won; 3) Goal difference; 4) Goals scored; 5) Head-to-head points; 6) Head-to-head goal difference; 7) Fair play ranking; 8) Drawing of lots.
(C) Champions; (P) Promoted; (R) Relegated

== Results ==
| Home \ Away | AJK | BUD | HON | BVS | CSÁ | GYI | GYŐ | KAZ | KOZ | MOS | NYÍ | PMF | SIÓ | SOR | SZG | HAL | TKÉ | VAS |
|---|---|---|---|---|---|---|---|---|---|---|---|---|---|---|---|---|---|---|
| Ajka | — | 3–1 | 0–2 | 0–1 | 0–1 | 1–0 | 0–1 | 1–0 | 0–3 | 1–0 | 1–0 | 0–2 | 0–2 | 1–1 | 0–0 | 3–1 | 1–0 | 1–2 |
| Budafok | 2–0 | — | 1–0 | 2–0 | 1–2 | 1–3 | 2–1 | 2–0 | 1–2 | 2–2 | 3–2 | 2–0 | 1–0 | 0–0 | 1–0 | 0–1 | 2–1 | 0–0 |
| Honvéd | 1–0 | 2–2 | — | 1–1 | 2–2 | 2–2 | 2–1 | 0–1 | 1–2 | 3–1 | 1–1 | 4–0 | 0–1 | 4–1 | 0–1 | 1–2 | 2–1 | 0–3 |
| BVSC-Zugló | 0–2 | 2–1 | | — | 1–0 | 0–3 | 1–0 | 3–0 | 0–1 | 1–0 | 1–2 | 0–0 | 2–0 | 1–2 | 0–1 | 1–0 | 0–0 | 0–2 |
| Csákvár | 1–0 | 0–1 | 1–2 | 0–1 | — | 0–2 | 1–2 | 0–0 | 3–1 | 2–0 | 1–7 | 1–0 | 1–0 | 1–2 | 0–1 | 4–2 | 1–2 | 2–3 |
| Gyirmót | 2–1 | 1–1 | 1–1 | 2–1 | 2–1 | — | 2–3 | 2–2 | 3–5 | 2–2 | 2–4 | 2–1 | 1–0 | 1–0 | 0–0 | 2–1 | 1–1 | 1–2 |
| Győr | 1–0 | 4–1 | 0–1 | 4–0 | 2–1 | 0–0 | — | 2–0 | 2–1 | 4–0 | 0–1 | 3–1 | 4–2 | 2–0 | 0–1 | 1–1 | 2–0 | |
| Kazincbarcika | 1–0 | 1–1 | 1–0 | 2–2 | 1–1 | 1–0 | 2–3 | — | 1–0 | 1–0 | 0–1 | 0–0 | 1–1 | 3–1 | 0–1 | 2–2 | 2–2 | 1–1 |
| Kozármisleny | 1–0 | 2–0 | 1–2 | 0–2 | 1–1 | 2–2 | 1–0 | 0–2 | — | 2–1 | 0–2 | 3–0 | 7–0 | 2–1 | 1–1 | 2–0 | 1–2 | 4–3 |
| Mosonmagyaróvár | 0–2 | 1–1 | 0–2 | 3–3 | 0–1 | 2–2 | 0–5 | 0–3 | 1–1 | — | 0–3 | 0–1 | 1–3 | 0–2 | 0–1 | 2–1 | 0–2 | 1–3 |
| Nyíregyháza | 2–1 | 2–0 | 0–0 | 2–0 | 2–1 | 3–1 | 3–2 | 1–0 | 5–1 | 2–0 | — | 2–1 | 2–0 | 1–1 | 0–0 | 2–1 | 2–0 | 3–1 |
| Pécs | 0–1 | 1–0 | 0–0 | 1–1 | 0–1 | 0–0 | 0–1 | 0–3 | 2–2 | 1–0 | 0–4 | — | 2–2 | 1–0 | 1–1 | 1–1 | 1–0 | 0–0 |
| Siófok | 1–1 | 3–1 | 2–1 | 1–0 | 1–2 | 2–4 | 2–4 | 3–0 | 0–3 | 1–3 | 1–3 | 0–1 | — | 0–1 | 0–0 | 1–1 | 1–1 | 0–1 |
| Soroksár | 1–3 | 3–1 | 1–1 | 2–1 | 2–0 | 1–0 | 1–3 | 3–1 | 2–1 | 3–4 | 1–2 | 0–0 | 2–0 | — | 1–1 | 1–1 | 1–0 | 1–1 |
| Szeged | 0–2 | 1–0 | 1–0 | 2–0 | 0–2 | 1–1 | 1–1 | 3–0 | 2–0 | 3–2 | 1–1 | 1–0 | 1–1 | 0–0 | — | 2–1 | 0–2 | 4–3 |
| Haladás | 1–3 | 2–0 | 1–0 | 1–0 | 2–2 | 1–1 | 1–3 | 1–3 | 1–1 | 0–1 | 1–1 | 0–1 | 3–2 | 2–1 | 1–1 | — | 2–1 | 3–3 |
| Tiszakécske | 2–1 | 2–2 | 1–1 | 1–1 | 1–1 | 0–1 | 0–1 | 2–0 | 0–0 | 0–1 | 1–1 | 0–0 | 1–3 | 1–0 | 2–2 | 2–3 | — | 1–2 |
| Vasas | 0–0 | 0–1 | 3–0 | 2–0 | 1–1 | 2–0 | 6–0 | 2–2 | 2–1 | 5–1 | 3–0 | 4–1 | 4–0 | 4–0 | 0–0 | 1–0 | 1–1 | — |

Source: Hungarian Football Federation (in Hungarian), Soccerway
Legend: Blue = home team win; Yellow = draw; Red = away team win.
For upcoming matches, an "a" indicates there is an article about the rivalry between the two participants.

=== Results by round ===
| Team ╲ Round | 1 | 2 | 3 | 4 | 5 | 6 | 7 | 8 | 9 | 10 | 11 | 12 | 13 | 14 | 15 | 16 | 17 | 18 | 19 | 20 | 21 | 22 | 23 | 24 | 25 | 26 | 27 | 28 | 29 | 30 | 31 | 32 | 33 | 34 |
|---|---|---|---|---|---|---|---|---|---|---|---|---|---|---|---|---|---|---|---|---|---|---|---|---|---|---|---|---|---|---|---|---|---|---|
| Ajka | D | L | D | W | L | L | L | L | L | L | L | L | L | W | L | W | L | W | W | W | W | W | W | D | D | W | | | | | | | | |
| Budafok | W | W | D | W | W | L | L | W | D | L | L | D | L | L | D | L | W | D | L | L | L | L | L | W | D | W | | | | | | | | |
| Honvéd | W | L | D | W | L | L | W | D | D | L | W | D | L | L | W | D | D | D | W | D | D | L | L | W | W | L | | | | | | | | |
| BVSC-Zugló | W | L | L | L | L | D | D | D | L | W | L | W | W | L | L | D | D | L | W | L | W | L | W | D | W | L | | | | | | | | |
| Csákvár | L | W | L | L | L | W | W | W | D | D | W | L | L | W | D | L | D | D | D | L | L | W | L | W | W | D | | | | | | | | |
| Gyirmót | L | L | D | D | D | D | D | L | W | W | W | W | D | L | W | D | D | D | W | W | D | D | W | L | L | L | | | | | | | | |
| Győr | W | W | W | W | L | W | L | D | W | W | W | D | W | W | W | L | W | D | L | W | L | L | W | L | W | W | | | | | | | | |
| Kazincbarcika | L | W | D | D | D | W | D | D | D | W | L | D | W | D | L | W | L | L | W | W | L | D | L | W | L | D | | | | | | | | |
| Kozármisleny | L | W | W | L | W | W | D | D | W | L | W | W | D | W | D | W | L | D | L | D | W | L | W | L | W | D | | | | | | | | |
| Mosonmagyaróvár | L | L | L | L | D | D | L | D | L | L | L | W | L | L | D | L | W | L | L | L | L | D | L | L | L | L | | | | | | | | |
| Nyíregyháza | W | D | D | D | W | W | W | D | W | W | W | L | W | W | W | W | W | W | W | D | W | W | D | L | D | W | | | | | | | | |
| Pécs | W | W | D | D | W | D | D | L | L | L | D | D | W | L | D | W | L | W | D | L | L | L | L | D | L | D | | | | | | | | |
| Siófok | L | L | D | D | W | L | D | W | L | L | L | L | W | L | D | L | L | L | D | W | W | W | L | L | D | L | | | | | | | | |
| Soroksár | D | W | W | W | L | L | L | D | L | L | W | D | D | W | D | L | D | L | L | W | W | W | D | W | L | D | | | | | | | | |
| Szeged | W | W | D | D | W | L | D | D | D | W | D | D | D | W | D | W | W | W | D | L | D | W | W | W | D | L | | | | | | | | |
| Haladás | L | L | L | D | W | W | D | D | W | W | D | L | L | D | D | L | D | W | D | D | L | W | W | W | L | D | | | | | | | | |
| Tiszakécske | W | D | D | L | L | L | W | L | D | W | D | D | L | L | L | D | D | D | L | L | D | L | L | L | D | W | | | | | | | | |
| Vasas | L | L | W | D | D | W | W | W | W | D | L | W | W | W | D | W | D | D | D | W | W | D | W | D | W | W | | | | | | | | |

Updated to match(es) played on 3 April 2024. Source: Hungarian Football Federation
W = Win; D = Draw; L = Loss

=== Positions by round ===
Note: The place taken by the team that played fewer matches than the opponents was underlined. (Note: The list of postponed matches: Tiszakécske - Kozármisleny (17th round, played on 14 February 2024); Haladás - BVSC-Zugló (17th round, played on 14 February 2024); Győr - Gyirmót (17th round, played on 14 February 2024); Soroksár - Ajka (17th round, played on 14 February 2024); Budafok - Vasas (17th round, played on 14 February 2024))

| Team ╲ Round | 1 | 2 | 3 | 4 | 5 | 6 | 7 | 8 | 9 | 10 | 11 | 12 | 13 | 14 | 15 | 16 | 17 | 18 | 19 | 20 | 21 | 22 | 23 | 24 | 25 | 26 | 27 | 28 | 29 | 30 | 31 | 32 | 33 | 34 |
|---|---|---|---|---|---|---|---|---|---|---|---|---|---|---|---|---|---|---|---|---|---|---|---|---|---|---|---|---|---|---|---|---|---|---|
| Nyíregyháza | 1 | 5 | 7 | 8 | 7 | 4 | 2 | 3 | 2 | 2 | 2 | 2 | 2 | 2 | 2 | 1 | 1 | 1 | 1 | 1 | 1 | 1 | 1 | 1 | 1 | 1 | 1 | 1 | 1 | 1 | 1 | 1 | | |
| Győr | 2 | 1 | 1 | 1 | 2 | 1 | 1 | 1 | 1 | 1 | 1 | 1 | 1 | 1 | 1 | 2 | 2 | 2 | 2 | 2 | 2 | 2 | 2 | 2 | 2 | 2 | | | | | | | | |
| Vasas | 17 | 14 | 11 | 12 | 10 | 9 | 7 | 4 | 3 | 3 | 4 | 4 | 3 | 3 | 3 | 3 | 3 | 4 | 4 | 3 | 3 | 3 | 3 | 3 | 3 | 3 | | | | | | | | |
| Szeged | 8 | 3 | 3 | 4 | 4 | 6 | 6 | 7 | 6 | 6 | 5 | 5 | 5 | 5 | 5 | 5 | 5 | 3 | 3 | 4 | 5 | 4 | 4 | 4 | 4 | 4 | | | | | | | | |
| Kozármisleny | 13 | 11 | 6 | 7 | 6 | 3 | 3 | 5 | 4 | 4 | 3 | 3 | 4 | 4 | 4 | 4 | 4 | 5 | 5 | 5 | 4 | 5 | 5 | 5 | 5 | 5 | | | | | | | | |
| Gyirmót | 11 | 15 | 15 | 15 | 17 | 17 | 17 | 17 | 15 | 14 | 12 | 8 | 8 | 10 | 7 | 7 | 7 | 8 | 6 | 6 | 6 | 6 | 6 | 6 | 6 | 7 | | | | | | | | |
| Soroksár | 10 | 7 | 4 | 3 | 5 | 7 | 8 | 9 | 12 | 13 | 11 | 12 | 12 | 8 | 8 | 10 | 11 | 12 | 12 | 10 | 8 | 7 | 7 | 7 | 7 | 6 | | | | | | | | |
| Kazincbarcika | 15 | 8 | 9 | 9 | 9 | 8 | 10 | 11 | 11 | 8 | 10 | 11 | 6 | 7 | 9 | 6 | 6 | 9 | 7 | 7 | 7 | 8 | 8 | 8 | 10 | 10 | | | | | | | | |
| Csákvár | 12 | 9 | 12 | 13 | 15 | 12 | 11 | 8 | 7 | 9 | 6 | 7 | 10 | 6 | 6 | 9 | 9 | 7 | 10 | 11 | 11 | 9 | 11 | 11 | 8 | 9 | | | | | | | | |
| Honvéd | 3 | 10 | 10 | 6 | 8 | 10 | 9 | 10 | 9 | 12 | 9 | 9 | 11 | 13 | 10 | 11 | 12 | 11 | 9 | 8 | 9 | 10 | 12 | 12 | 9 | 12 | | | | | | | | |
| Haladás | 16 | 16 | 17 | 17 | 14 | 11 | 13 | 12 | 10 | 7 | 8 | 10 | 13 | 12 | 13 | 13 | 13 | 13 | 14 | 13 | 12 | 11 | 9 | 9 | 11 | 11 | | | | | | | | |
| Ajka | 9 | 13 | 14 | 11 | 13 | 14 | 15 | 16 | 17 | 17 | 17 | 18 | 18 | 17 | 17 | 17 | 17 | 17 | 16 | 15 | 13 | 12 | 10 | 10 | 12 | 8 | | | | | | | | |
| Pécs | 7 | 4 | 5 | 5 | 3 | 5 | 5 | 6 | 8 | 10 | 13 | 13 | 9 | 11 | 12 | 8 | 10 | 6 | 8 | 9 | 10 | 13 | 14 | 14 | 15 | 15 | | | | | | | | |
| Budafok | 5 | 2 | 2 | 2 | 1 | 2 | 4 | 2 | 5 | 5 | 7 | 6 | 7 | 9 | 11 | 12 | 8 | 10 | 11 | 12 | 14 | 14 | 15 | 15 | 14 | 13 | | | | | | | | |
| BVSC-Zugló | 6 | 12 | 13 | 14 | 16 | 16 | 16 | 15 | 16 | 16 | 16 | 15 | 14 | 14 | 14 | 14 | 14 | 14 | 13 | 14 | 15 | 15 | 13 | 13 | 13 | 14 | | | | | | | | |
| Siófok | 18 | 17 | 16 | 16 | 12 | 15 | 14 | 13 | 14 | 15 | 15 | 16 | 16 | 16 | 16 | 16 | 16 | 16 | 17 | 16 | 16 | 16 | 16 | 16 | 16 | 16 | | | | | | | | |
| Tiszakécske | 4 | 6 | 8 | 10 | 11 | 13 | 12 | 14 | 13 | 11 | 14 | 14 | 15 | 15 | 15 | 15 | 15 | 15 | 15 | 17 | 17 | 17 | 17 | 17 | 17 | 17 | 17 | | | | | | | |
| Mosonmagyaróvár | 14 | 18 | 18 | 18 | 18 | 18 | 18 | 18 | 18 | 18 | 18 | 17 | 17 | 18 | 18 | 18 | 18 | 18 | 18 | 18 | 18 | 18 | 18 | 18 | 18 | 18 | 18 | 18 | 18 | | | | | |

| Nemzeti Bajnokság II champion Promotion to Nemzeti Bajnokság I |
| Promotion to Nemzeti Bajnokság I |
| Relegation to Nemzeti Bajnokság III |

Updated to match(es) played on 3 April 2024. Source: Hungarian Football Federation

== Statistics ==
=== Top goalscorers ===
As of 26 May 2024

| Rank | Player | Club | Goals |
|---|---|---|---|
| 1 | (Hungary) Krisztián Kirchner | Kozármisleny | 18 |
| 1 | (Hungary) Milán Tóth | Vasas | 18 |
| 3 | (Romania) Claudiu Bumba | Győr | 17 |
| 4 | (Hungary) Zalán Kerezsi | Honvéd | 11 |
| 4 | (Hungary) Dominik Nagy | Nyíregyháza | 11 |
| 6 | (Hungary) Zoltán Gálfi | Soroksár | 10 |
| 6 | (Hungary) Krisztián Géresi | Nyíregyháza | 10 |
| 6 | (Hungary) Zoárd Nagy | Csákvár | 10 |
| 6 | (Hungary) Barnabás Rácz | Haladás | 10 |
| 10 | (Hungary) Péter Horváth | Kozármisleny | 9 |
| 10 | (Hungary) Balázs Lovrencsics | Soroksár | 9 |
| 10 | (Hungary) Márk Madarász | Gyirmót | 9 |
| 10 | (Hungary) Zoltán Medgyes | Gyirmót | 9 |
| 10 | (Hungary) Barnabás Németh | Siófok | 9 |

=== Hat-tricks ===
| Player | For | Against | Result | Date | Round |
|---|---|---|---|---|---|
| (Hungary) Tamás Takács | Mosonmagyaróvár | BVSC-Zugló | 3–3 (H) | 28 August 2023 | 6 |
| (Hungary) Krisztián Géresi | Nyíregyháza | Csákvár | 1–7 (A) | 26 November 2023 | 15 |
| (Hungary) Milán Tóth | Vasas | Pécs | 4–1 (H) | 19 February 2024 | 21 |

=== Attendances ===
| Pos | Team | Total | High | Low | Average | Change |
|---|---|---|---|---|---|---|
| 1 | Honvéd | 29,466 | 3,709 | 1,075 | 2,456 | −39.6%^{1} |
| 2 | Győr | 19,612 | 2,218 | 887 | 1,783 | +108.3% |
| 3 | Szeged | 16,052 | 3,214 | 516 | 1,459 | +29.0% |
| 4 | Vasas | 15,921 | 2,522 | 949 | 1,447 | −35.3%^{1} |
| 5 | Gyirmót | 11,868 | 4,578 | 525 | 989 | +15.9% |
| 6 | Haladás | 9,452 | 1,513 | 300 | 859 | −24.4% |
| 7 | Pécs | 9,350 | 2,500 | 200 | 850 | −30.4% |
| 8 | Ajka | 9,400 | 2,000 | 200 | 783 | −28.5% |
| 9 | Kozármisleny | 9,300 | 1,000 | 600 | 775 | +33.9% |
| 10 | BVSC-Zugló | 5,888 | 1,359 | 200 | 535 | n/a^{2} |
| 11 | Nyíregyháza | 5,393 | 1,000 | 200 | 490 | −1.4%^{3} |
| 12 | Siófok | 5,850 | 2,000 | 100 | 488 | +39.8% |
| 13 | Kazincbarcika | 5,230 | 650 | 300 | 475 | −10.9% |
| 14 | Budafok | 5,050 | 700 | 250 | 459 | +5.3% |
| 15 | Tiszakécske | 4,900 | 750 | 200 | 408 | +17.6% |
| 16 | Soroksár | 4,000 | 700 | 200 | 364 | −3.2% |
| 17 | Csákvár | 4,000 | 1,000 | 200 | 333 | +43.5% |
| 18 | Mosonmagyaróvár | 2,980 | 500 | 100 | 271 | −44.6% |
| | League total | 166,865 | 4,578 | 100 | 843 | +1.3% |

Updated to games played on 7 March 2024
Source: magyarfutball (in Hungarian)
Notes:
1. Team played last season in NB I.
2. Team played last season in NB III.
3. Nyíregyháza played their home matches in different stadium, because their stadium (Városi Stadion) is under reconstruction.

=== Number of teams by counties and regions ===
Number of teams by counties
| Pos. | County (megye) | No. of teams | Teams |
|---|---|---|---|
| 1 | Budapest | 5 | Budafok, BVSC-Zugló, Honvéd, Soroksár and Vasas |
| 2 | Győr-Moson-Sopron | 3 | Gyirmót, Győr and Mosonmagyaróvár |
| 3 | Baranya | 2 | Kozármisleny and Pécs |
| 4 | Bács-Kiskun | 1 | Tiszakécske |
| 4 | Borsod-Abaúj-Zemplén | 1 | Kazincbarcika |
| 4 | Csongrád-Csanád | 1 | Szeged |
| 4 | Fejér | 1 | Csákvár |
| 4 | Somogy | 1 | Siófok |
| 4 | Szabolcs-Szatmár-Bereg | 1 | Nyíregyháza |
| 4 | Vas | 1 | Haladás |
| 4 | Veszprém | 1 | Ajka |

Number of teams by regions
| Transdanubia | Central Hungary | Great Plain and North |
|---|---|---|
| Ajka; Csákvár; Gyirmót; Győr; Kozármisleny; Mosonmagyaróvár; Pécs; Siófok; Haladás | Budafok; BVSC-Zugló; Honvéd; Soroksár; Vasas | Kazincbarcika; Nyíregyháza; Szeged; Tiszakécske |
| 9 Teams | 5 Teams | 4 Teams |

== See also ==
- 2023–24 Magyar Kupa
- 2023–24 Nemzeti Bajnokság I
- 2023–24 Nemzeti Bajnokság III
- 2023–24 Megyei Bajnokság I
