= Dénes Vilmos =

Hungarian footballer (born 2005)

Personal information
- Full name: Dénes Csanád Vilmos
- Date of birth: 17 November 2004 (age 21)
- Place of birth: Budapest, Hungary
- Height: 1.81 m (5 ft 11 in)
- Positions: Winger; forward

Team information
- Current team: Debreceni VSC
- Number: 97

Youth career
- –2016: Szár KSE
- 2016–2019: Puskás Akadémia FC
- 2019–2021: Aqvital FC Csákvár
- 2021–2022: Videoton FC Fehérvár

Senior career*
Years	Team	Apps	(Gls)
2020–2021	Csákvár	0	(0)
2021–2022	Videoton FC Fehérvár	34	(3)
2022–2024	BFC Siófok	55	(9)
2024–2025	Zalaegerszegi TE	37	(6)
2025–2026	KV Kortrijk	21	(1)
2026–	Debreceni VSC	9	(2)

International career^{‡}
- Hungary U18
2024	Hungary U20	2	(0)
2024–2026	Hungary U21	16	(2)
- * Club domestic league appearances and goals as of 24 October 2026 ‡ National team caps and goals as of 1 October 2026

Dénes Csanád Vilmos (born 17 November 2004) is a Hungarian professional footballer who plays as a winger or forward for Debreceni VSC.

== Club career ==
As a youth player, Vilmos joined the youth academy of Aqvital FC Csákvár and was promoted to the club's senior team in 2020, where he made zero league appearances and scored zero goals.

Following his stint there, he signed for Videoton FC Fehérvár in 2021. One year later, he signed for BFC Siófok. Ahead of the 2024–25 season, he signed for Zalaegerszegi TE, before signing for Belgian side KV Kortrijk in 2025, where he was regarded to have failed to establish himself as a regular starter while playing for the club and helped them achieve promotion from the second tier to the top flight. Afterwards, he signed for Debreceni VSC in 2026, where he worse the number ninety-seven jersey.

== International career ==
Vilmos is a Hungary youth international and has represented the country internationally at under-18, under-20 and under-21 levels. Altogether, he made two appearances and scored zero goals while playing for the Hungary national under-20 football team.

On 5 September 2024, he debuted for the Hungary national under-21 football team during a 1–2 home friendly loss to the Slovakia national under-21 football team. During September and October 2024, he played for the Hungary national under-21 football team for 2025 UEFA European Under-21 Championship qualification.

== Personal life ==
Vilmos was born on 17 November 2004. Born in Hungary, he has been nicknamed "Vili".
