= István Berki =

Hungarian footballer

Personal information
- Date of birth: 1 February 1994 (age 32)
- Place of birth: Vác, Hungary
- Height: 1.69 m (5 ft 7 in)
- Position: Midfielder

Youth career
- 2006–2008: Újpest
- 2008–2011: Haladás
- 2011–2013: Vác
- 2013: Eger

Senior career*
Years	Team	Apps	(Gls)
2011–2013	Vác	32	(3)
2013–2014	Csákvár	16	(1)
2014–2015	Puskás	4	(0)
2015–2016	Siófok	19	(1)
2016–2017	Salgótarján	11	(2)
2017–2018	Rakosmente	13	(3)
2018	Monor	10	(0)
2018–2019	Balmazújváros	31	(8)
2019–2020	Kazincbarcikai	22	(4)
2020–2022	Győri ETO	60	(7)
2022–2023	Gyirmót	21	(4)

International career^{‡}
2014	Hungary U-20	1	(0)
- * Club domestic league appearances and goals as of 14 May 2023 ‡ National team caps and goals as of 30 April 2014

István Berki (born 1 February 1994) is a Hungarian professional footballer.

== Career ==
On 25 August 2022, Berki joined Gyirmót on a two-year contract, with an option for a third year.

== Career statistics ==
Appearances and goals by club, season and competition
Club	Season	League			Cup		League Cup		Europe		Total	
Club	Season	Division	Apps	Goals	Apps	Goals	Apps	Goals	Apps	Goals	Apps	Goals
Vác
Vác	2011–12	Nemzeti Bajnokság II	20	0	2	0	—		—		22	0
Vác	2012–13	Nemzeti Bajnokság II	12	3	3	1	—		—		15	4
Vác	Total		32	3	5	1	—		—		37	4
Csákvár	2013–14	Nemzeti Bajnokság III	16	1	3	0	—		—		19	1
Puskás	2013–14	Nemzeti Bajnokság I	4	0	0	0	2	0	—		6	0
Siófok	2015–16	Nemzeti Bajnokság II	19	1	1	0	—		—		20	1
Salgótarján	2016–17	Nemzeti Bajnokság III	11	2	0	0	—		—		11	2
Rakosmente	2017–18	Nemzeti Bajnokság III	13	3	2	0	—		—		15	3
Monor	2017–18	Nemzeti Bajnokság III	10	0	0	0	—		—		10	0
Balmazújváros	2018–19	Nemzeti Bajnokság II	31	8	0	0	—		—		31	8
Career total			136	18	11	1	2	0	0	0	149	18

Updated to games played as of 19 May 2019.
