= Kristóf Herjeczki =

Hungarian footballer

Personal information
- Full name: Kristóf Herjeczki
- Date of birth: 23 June 1998 (age 28)
- Place of birth: Budapest, Hungary
- Height: 1.73 m (5 ft 8 in)
- Position: Right winger

Team information
- Current team: Csákvár
- Number: 71

Youth career
- 2006–2010: Ferencváros
- 2010–2017: Budapest Honvéd

Senior career*
Years	Team	Apps	(Gls)
2017–2019	Budapest Honvéd	9	(0)
2015–2018	→ Budapest Honvéd II	48	(8)
2018–2020	→ Gyirmót (loan)	56	(9)
2020–2023	Gyirmót	62	(3)
2022	→ Gyirmót II	9	(8)
2023–2024	Nyíregyháza Spartacus	22	(3)
2024–2025	Kazincbarcika	27	(2)
2025–2026	Ajka	13	(0)
2026–	Csákvár	10	(2)

International career
2015–2016	Hungary U-17	6	(0)
- * Club domestic league appearances and goals as of 31 May 2026

Kristóf Herjeczki (born 23 June 1998) is a Hungarian football player who plays for Nemzeti Bajnokság II club Csákvár.

== Career ==
=== Budapest Honvéd ===
On 15 July 2017, Herjeczki played his first match for Budapest Honvéd in a 2–0 win against Szombathelyi Haladás in the Hungarian League.

== Career statistics ==
Appearances and goals by club, season and competition
Club	Season	League		Cup		Europe		Total	
Club	Season	Apps	Goals	Apps	Goals	Apps	Goals	Apps	Goals
Budapest Honvéd II
Budapest Honvéd II	2014–15	9	0	–	–	–	–	9	0
Budapest Honvéd II	2015–16	7	0	–	–	–	–	7	0
Budapest Honvéd II	2016–17	14	4	–	–	–	–	14	4
Budapest Honvéd II	2017–18	18	4	–	–	–	–	18	4
Budapest Honvéd II	Total	48	8	0	0	0	0	48	8
Budapest Honvéd
Budapest Honvéd	2017–18	9	0	2	0	0	0	11	0
Budapest Honvéd	Total	9	0	2	0	0	0	11	0
Gyirmót
Gyirmót	2018–19	37	5	1	0	–	–	38	5
Gyirmót	2019–20	19	4	2	1	–	–	21	5
Gyirmót	2020–21	24	0	1	0	–	–	25	0
Gyirmót	2021–22	19	0	2	0	–	–	21	0
Gyirmót	2022–23	19	3	1	0	–	–	20	3
Gyirmót	Total	118	12	7	1	0	0	125	13
Nyíregyháza
Nyíregyháza	2023–24	22	3	3	0	–	–	25	3
Nyíregyháza	Total	22	3	3	0	0	0	25	3
Kazincbarcika
Kazincbarcika	2024–25	27	2	0	0	–	–	27	2
Kazincbarcika	Total	27	2	0	0	0	0	27	2
Career total		224	33	12	1	0	0	236	26

Updated to games played as of 20 July 2025.
