= Ede Višinka =

Serbian-Hungarian football manager and player

Ede Višinka Еде Вишинка
Personal information
- Date of birth: 19 May 1972 (age 54)
- Place of birth: Sombor, SFR Yugoslavia
- Height: 1.84 m (6 ft 0 in)
- Position: Defender

Youth career
- Radnički Sombor

Senior career*
| Years | Team | Apps | (Gls) |
| 1991–1993 | Proleter Zrenjanin | 3 | (0) |
| 1993–1995 | Beremendi Építők | | |
| 1996–1997 | Red Star Belgrade | 12 | (1) |
| 1997–1998 | Napredak Kruševac | 27 | (4) |
| 1998–2001 | Rad | 76 | (3) |
| 2001 | Hapoel Be'er Sheva | 3 | (0) |
| 2002–2003 | Obilić | 32 | (0) |
| 2003–2008 | Mladost Apatin | 138 | (14) |
| 2008 | KS/Leiftur | 17 | (2) |
| 2008 | Mladost Apatin | 9 | (0) |
| 2009 | Kecskemét | 13 | (0) |
| 2013–2016 | Ágasegyháza SE | 38 | (12) |
| 2016–2018 | SC Hírös-Ép | 27 | (12) |
| Total | | 395 | (48) |

Managerial career
- 2016–2017: Puskás Akadémia (youth)
- 2018–2019: Puskás Akadémia II
- 2019–2021: Csákvár
- 2021–2022: Tiszakécske
- 2022–2023: Nyíregyháza
- * Club domestic league appearances and goals

Ede Višinka (Serbian Cyrillic: Еде Вишинка, Hungarian: Visinka Ede; born 19 May 1972) is a Serbian-Hungarian football manager and former player.

== Playing career ==
While playing for Red Star Belgrade, Višinka won the FR Yugoslavia Cup in the 1996–97 season. He later played for Napredak Kruševac in the Second League of FR Yugoslavia, as well as for Rad and Obilić in the First League of FR Yugoslavia. Between 2003 and 2008, Višinka spent five seasons with Mladost Apatin, before moving abroad to Iceland. He ended his career after playing in the amateur leagues of Hungary.

== Managerial career ==
In June 2019, Višinka became manager of Nemzeti Bajnokság II club Aqvital FC Csákvár, spending two seasons in charge. He was then appointed as manager of Tiszakécskei LC in August 2021.

== Honours ==
Red Star Belgrade

- FR Yugoslavia Cup: 1996–97
