= 2020–21 Nemzeti Bajnokság II =

Nemzeti Bajnokság II
- Season: 2020–21
- Promoted: Debrecen; Gyirmót
- Relegated: Kazincbarcikai; Kaposvár; DEAC
- Matches: 360
- Goals: 925 (2.57 per match)
- Top goalscorer: Tamás Priskin (21)
- All statistics correct as of 23 July 2020.

The 2020–21 Nemzeti Bajnokság II (also known as the 2020–21 Merkantil Bank Liga) is Hungary's 70th season of the Nemzeti Bajnokság II, the second tier of the Hungarian football league system. The season began in August 2020 and finished in May 2021.

== Teams ==
The following teams have changed division since the 2019–20 season.

=== Team changes ===
==== To NB II ====
Relegated from 2019–20 Nemzeti Bajnokság I	Promoted from 2019–20 Nemzeti Bajnokság III
▼ Debreceni VSC ▼ Kaposvár	▲ Debreceni EAC (East) ▲ Pécs (Centre) ▲ Szentlőrinc (Centre)

==== From NB II ====
Promoted to 2020–21 Nemzeti Bajnokság I	Relegated to 2020–21 Nemzeti Bajnokság III
▲MTK Budapest ▲ Budafok	▼ Tiszakécske (East) ▼ Vác (Centre) ▼ Balmazújváros (Hajdú-Bihar I)

=== Stadium and locations ===
Location of teams in 2020–21 Nemzeti Bajnokság II
Location of Budapest teams.

Following is the list of clubs competing in the league this season, with their location, stadium and stadium capacity.

Team	Location	Stadium	Capacity	2019–20
Ajka	Ajka	Városi Stadion	5,000	9th
Békéscsaba	Békéscsaba	Kórház utcai Stadion	2,479	15th
Csákvár	Csákvár	Tersztyánszky Ödön Stadion	2,020	4th
Budaörs	Budaörs	Árok utcai Stadion	604	11th
Debreceni EAC	Debrecen	Dóczy József utcai Stadion	3,200	1st (NB III, East)
Debreceni VSC	Debrecen	Nagyerdei Stadion	20,340	11th (NB I)
Dorog	Dorog	Buzánszky Jenő Stadion	5,000	13th
Gyirmót	Győr (Gyirmót)	Ménfői úti Stadion	4,728	7th
Győr	Győr	ETO Park	15,600	6th
Kaposvár	Kaposvár	Rákóczi Stadion	7,000	12th (NB I)
Kazincbarcika	Kazincbarcika	Kolorcity Aréna	1,080	14th
Nyíregyháza	Nyíregyháza	Városi Stadion	10,300	8th
Pécs	Pécs	Stadion PMFC	7,000	1st (NB III, Central)
Siófok	Siófok	Révész Géza utcai Stadion	6,500	5th
Soroksár	Budapest (Soroksár)	Szamosi Mihály Sportelep	5,000	10th
Szeged-Csanád	Szeged	Szent Gellért Fórum	8,136	12th
Szentlőrinc	Szentlőrinc	Szentlőrinci Sportpálya	1,020	2nd (NB III, Central)
Szolnok	Szolnok	Tiszaligeti Stadion	3,437	16th
Szombathelyi Haladás	Szombathely	Haladás Sportkomplexum	8,940	17th
Vasas	Budapest (Angyalföld)	Illovszky Rudolf Stadion	5,154	3rd

=== Personnel and kits ===
Team	Head coach	Captain	Kit manufacturer	Shirt sponsor
Ajka	(Hungary) Károly Kis	(Hungary) Zoltán Kenderes	Zeus	–
Békéscsaba	(Hungary) Sándor Preisinger	(Hungary) Sándor Nagy	Saller	Békés Drén
Budaörs	(Hungary) Tibor Márkus		Ziccer	Volkswagen
Csákvár	(Hungary) Ede Visinka		2Rule	Euroaszfalt
Debreceni EAC	(Hungary) László Schőn		Adidas	You;med
Debreceni VSC	(Hungary) Szabolcs Huszti	(Hungary) Balázs Dzsudzsák	Adidas	TippMix, Grand Casino
Dorog	(Hungary) Szabolcs Németh	(Hungary) Áron Mészáros	Adidas	Pannon Falap-Lemez
Gyirmót	(Hungary) Aurél Csertői		Jako	Alcufer
Győri ETO	(Hungary) Barna Dobos		Adidas	WKW
Kaposvár	(Hungary) Péter Várhidi		Zeus	TippMix
Kazincbarcika	(Hungary) Zoltán Vitelki		Puma	KolorCity
Nyíregyháza	(Hungary) György Gálhidi	(Hungary) Ferenc Fodor	Jako	Révész
Pécs	(Hungary) László Vas	(Hungary) Zsombor Futó	Macron	–
Siófok	(Hungary) István Gál		Nike	HunGast
Soroksár	(Hungary) Péter Lipcsei		Nike	Soroksár District
Szeged-Csanád	(Hungary) Barna Dobos	(Hungary) Tamás Germán	hummel	–
Szentlőrinc	(Slovakia) Marián Sluka		Macron	–
Szolnok	(Hungary) József Csábi		hummel	–
Szombathelyi Haladás	(Hungary) János Mátyus		2Rule	–
Vasas	(Hungary) Szabolcs Schindler		Adidas	Alprosys

=== Managerial changes ===
Team	Outgoing manager	Manner of departure	Date of vacancy	Position in table	Incoming manager	Date of appointment	Ref.
Debreceni VSC	(Hungary) Elemér Kondás	Sacked	16 February 2021	1st	(Hungary) Szabolcs Huszti	16 February 2021	

== League table ==
Pos	Team	Pld	W	D	L	GF	GA	GD	Pts	Promotion or relegation
1	Debreceni VSC (P, C)	38	24	8	6	89	40	+49	80	Promotion to Nemzeti Bajnokság I
2	Gyirmót (P)	38	24	6	8	60	31	+29	78	Promotion to Nemzeti Bajnokság I
3	Vasas	38	23	9	6	65	35	+30	78	
4	Pécsi Mecsek FC	38	17	13	8	51	33	+18	64	
5	Ajka	38	19	5	14	65	47	+18	62	
6	Budaörs	38	18	5	15	62	59	+3	59	
7	Nyíregyháza	38	16	9	13	40	31	+9	57	
8	Soroksár	38	16	9	13	51	44	+7	57	
9	Szolnok	38	15	12	11	43	40	+3	57	
10	Szeged-Csanád GA	38	16	8	14	46	54	−8	56	
11	Szombathelyi Haladás	38	14	12	12	50	42	+8	54	
12	Győri ETO	38	12	10	16	53	48	+5	46	
13	Siófok	38	13	6	19	49	58	−9	45	
14	Dorog	38	11	11	16	34	50	−16	44	
15	Békéscsaba	38	11	11	16	43	60	−17	44	
16	Szentlőrinc SE	38	11	9	18	32	52	−20	42	
17	Csákvár	38	9	11	18	54	66	−12	38	
18	Kazincbarcika (R)	38	8	9	21	32	61	−29	33	Relegation to Nemzeti Bajnokság III
19	Kaposvári Rákóczi FC (Note: Deducted 1 point for fielding ineligible player.) (R)	38	7	12	19	33	65	−32	32	Relegation to Nemzeti Bajnokság III
20	DEAC (R)	38	6	5	27	32	68	−36	23	Relegation to Nemzeti Bajnokság III

Source: MLSZ (in Hungarian), Soccerway
Rules for classification: 1) Points; 2) Head-to-head points; 3) Head-to-head goal difference; 4) Head-to-head goals scored; 5) Head-to-head away goals scored; 6) Goal difference; 7) Goals scored.
(C) Champions; (P) Promoted; (R) Relegated

== See also ==
- 2020–21 Magyar Kupa
- 2020–21 Nemzeti Bajnokság I
- 2020–21 Nemzeti Bajnokság III
- 2020–21 Megyei Bajnokság I
