= Ádám Hajdú =

Hungarian footballer

Personal information
- Full name: Ádám Hajdú
- Date of birth: 16 January 1993 (age 33)
- Place of birth: Dunaújváros, Hungary
- Height: 1.83 m (6 ft 0 in)
- Position: Central midfielder

Team information
- Current team: Gyirmót
- Number: 18

Youth career
- 2003–2006: Dunaújváros
- 2006–2012: MTK Budapest
- 2010–2011: → Liverpool (loan)

Senior career*
| Years | Team | Apps | (Gls) |
| 2012–2016 | MTK Budapest | 31 | (2) |
| 2016–2017 | Budapest Honvéd | 13 | (0) |
| 2017 | → Paks (loan) | 11 | (1) |
| 2017–2018 | Paks | 23 | (0) |
| 2018–2020 | Vasas | 39 | (2) |
| 2020– | Gyirmót | 138 | (3) |

International career
| 2011–2012 | Hungary U-19 | 2 | (0) |
- * Club domestic league appearances and goals as of 10 June 2025

Ádám Hajdú (born 16 January 1993 in Dunaújváros) is a Hungarian professional footballer who plays for Gyirmót.

== Career statistics ==
Appearances and goals by club, season and competition
| Club | Season | League | | | Cup | | League Cup | | Europe | | Total | |
| Club | Season | Division | Apps | Goals | Apps | Goals | Apps | Goals | Apps | Goals | Apps | Goals |
|---|---|---|---|---|---|---|---|---|---|---|---|---|
MTK
| MTK | 2011–12 | Nemzeti Bajnokság II | 2 | 1 | 0 | 0 | 0 | 0 | — | | 2 | 1 |
| MTK | 2012–13 | Nemzeti Bajnokság I | 0 | 0 | 0 | 0 | 2 | 0 | — | | 2 | 0 |
| MTK | 2013–14 | Nemzeti Bajnokság I | 6 | 0 | 1 | 0 | 6 | 0 | — | | 13 | 0 |
| MTK | 2014–15 | Nemzeti Bajnokság I | 10 | 0 | 4 | 0 | 11 | 5 | — | | 25 | 5 |
| MTK | 2015–16 | Nemzeti Bajnokság I | 13 | 1 | 1 | 0 | — | | 0 | 0 | 14 | 1 |
| MTK | Total | | 31 | 2 | 6 | 0 | 19 | 5 | 0 | 0 | 56 | 7 |
| Budapest Honvéd | 2016–17 | Nemzeti Bajnokság I | 13 | 0 | 3 | 0 | — | | 0 | 0 | 16 | 0 |
Paks
| Paks | 2016–17 | Nemzeti Bajnokság I | 11 | 1 | 0 | 0 | — | | — | | 11 | 1 |
| Paks | 2017–18 | Nemzeti Bajnokság I | 22 | 0 | 2 | 0 | — | | — | | 24 | 0 |
| Paks | 2018–19 | Nemzeti Bajnokság I | 1 | 0 | 0 | 0 | — | | — | | 1 | 0 |
| Paks | Total | | 34 | 1 | 2 | 0 | 0 | 0 | 0 | 0 | 36 | 1 |
Vasas
| Vasas | 2018–19 | Nemzeti Bajnokság II | 22 | 2 | 2 | 1 | — | | — | | 24 | 3 |
| Vasas | 2019–20 | Nemzeti Bajnokság II | 17 | 0 | 3 | 0 | — | | — | | 20 | 0 |
| Vasas | Total | | 39 | 2 | 5 | 1 | 0 | 0 | 0 | 0 | 44 | 3 |
Gyirmót
| Gyirmót | 2020–21 | Nemzeti Bajnokság II | 35 | 2 | 1 | 0 | — | | — | | 36 | 2 |
| Gyirmót | 2021–22 | Nemzeti Bajnokság I | 31 | 0 | 2 | 0 | — | | — | | 33 | 0 |
| Gyirmót | Total | | 66 | 2 | 3 | 0 | 0 | 0 | 0 | 0 | 68 | 2 |
| Career total | | | 183 | 7 | 16 | 1 | 19 | 5 | 0 | 0 | 220 | 13 |

Updated to games played as of 15 May 2022.
