= Patrik Nagy =

Hungarian footballer

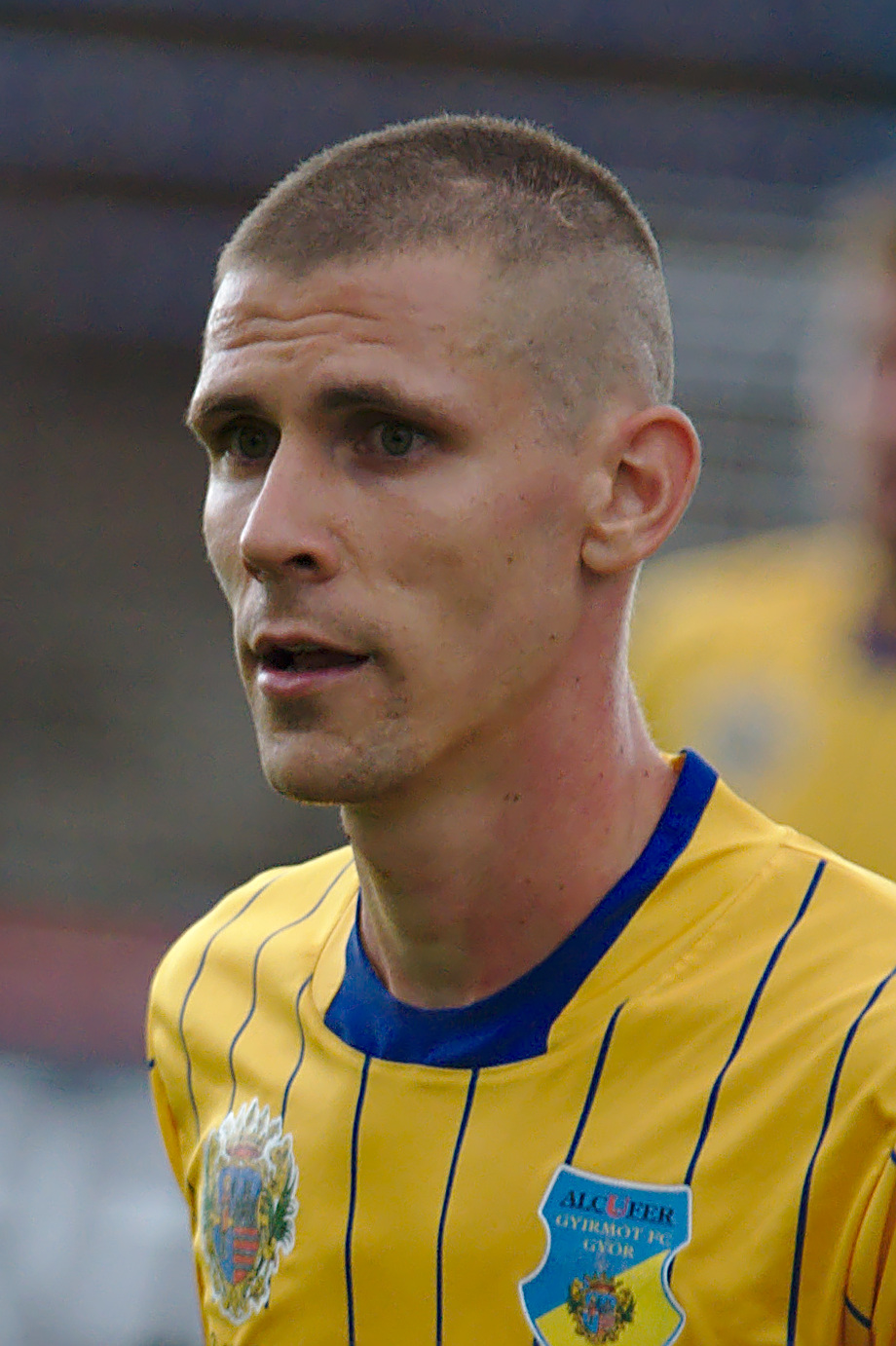

Personal information
- Date of birth: 16 February 1991 (age 35)
- Place of birth: Győr, Hungary
- Height: 1.75 m (5 ft 9 in)
- Position: Midfielder

Youth career
- 2003–2005: Győr
- 2005–2009: Rapid Wien

Senior career*
Years	Team	Apps	(Gls)
2009–2011	Rapid Wien II	17	(2)
2010–2011	→ Ferencváros II (loan)	12	(0)
2011	→ Vasas (loan)	1	(0)
2011–2013	Újpest	13	(0)
2013–2014	Kecskemét	20	(1)
2014–2015	Seligenporten	14	(1)
2015–2017	Haladás	29	(1)
2016–2017	→ Soproni (loan)	35	(0)
2017–2023	Gyirmót	200	(46)
2023	Mosonmagyaróvár	6	(0)

International career
2010	Hungary	1	(0)
- * Club domestic league appearances and goals as of 3 September 2023

Patrik Nagy (born 16 February 1991) is a Hungarian midfielder.
