= Edvárd Rusák =

Hungarian footballer

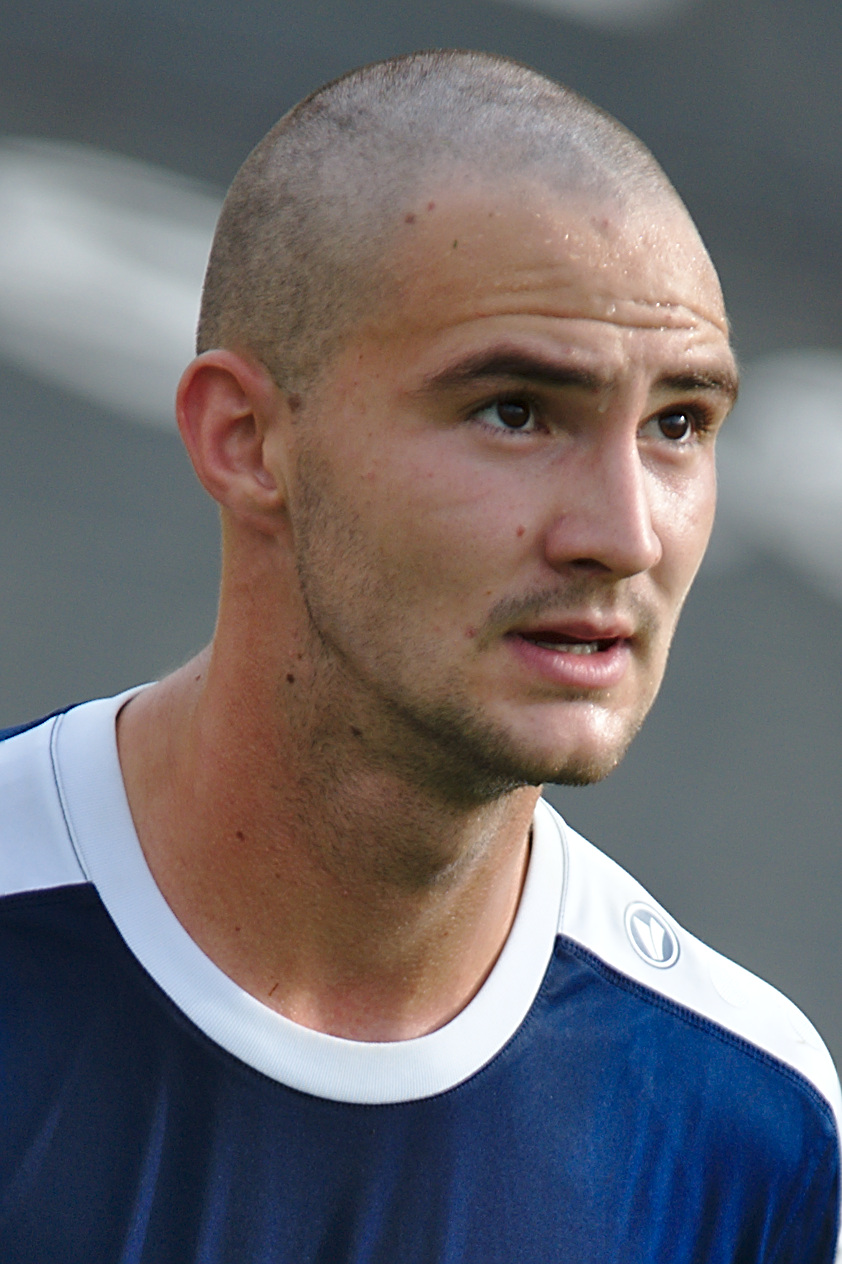

Personal information
- Full name: Edvárd Rusák
- Date of birth: 6 April 1994 (age 32)
- Place of birth: Senta, SFR Yugoslavia
- Height: 1.83 m (6 ft 0 in)
- Position: Goalkeeper

Team information
- Current team: Gyirmót
- Number: 12

Youth career
- 2010: Szentkorona AC
- 2010–2012: Kaposvár

Senior career*
Years	Team	Apps	(Gls)
2012–2015	Kaposvár	8	(0)
2015–	Gyirmót	148	(0)
- * Club domestic league appearances and goals as of 10 June 2025

Edvárd Rusák (born 6 April 1994 in Senta) is a Hungarian football player who currently plays for Gyirmót.

== Career statistics ==
Appearances and goals by club, season and competition
Club	Season	League			Cup		League Cup		Europe		Total	
Club	Season	Division	Apps	Goals	Apps	Goals	Apps	Goals	Apps	Goals	Apps	Goals
Kaposvár
Kaposvár	2012–13	Nemzeti Bajnokság I	0	0	0	0	1	0	—		1	0
Kaposvár	2013–14	Nemzeti Bajnokság I	3	0	2	0	2	0	—		7	0
Kaposvár	2014–15	Nemzeti Bajnokság II	5	0	2	0	3	0	—		10	0
Kaposvár	Total		8	0	4	0	6	0	0	0	18	0
Gyirmót
Gyirmót	2015–16	Nemzeti Bajnokság II	5	0	1	0	—		—		6	0
Gyirmót	2016–17	Nemzeti Bajnokság I	2	0	4	0	—		—		6	0
Gyirmót	2017–18	Nemzeti Bajnokság II	18	0	2	0	—		—		20	0
Gyirmót	2018–19	Nemzeti Bajnokság II	36	0	0	0	—		—		36	0
Gyirmót	2019–20	Nemzeti Bajnokság II	25	0	1	0	—		—		26	0
Gyirmót	2020–21	Nemzeti Bajnokság II	22	0	1	0	—		—		23	0
Gyirmót	2021–22	Nemzeti Bajnokság I	18	0	2	0	—		—		20	0
Gyirmót	Total		126	0	11	0	0	0	0	0	137	0
Career total			134	0	15	0	6	0	0	0	155	0

Updated to games played as of 15 May 2022.
