= Zoltán Medgyes =

Hungarian footballer (born 1995)

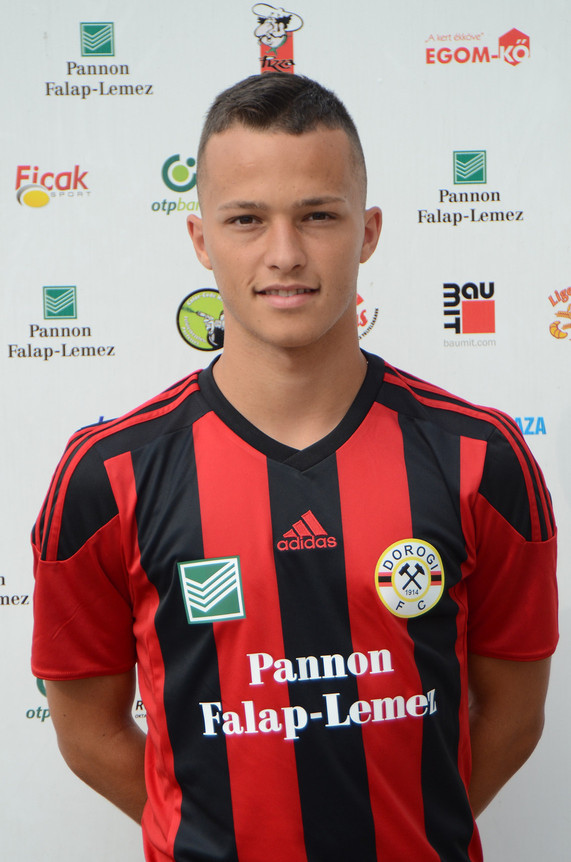

Personal information
- Full name: Zoltán Henrik Medgyes
- Date of birth: 23 July 1995 (age 31)
- Place of birth: Kistarcsa, Hungary
- Height: 1.72 m (5 ft 7 1/2 in)
- Position: Midfielder

Team information
- Current team: Budapest Honvéd
- Number: 23

Youth career
- 2004–2006: Rákosmente
- 2006–2008: Monor
- 2008–2014: Haladás

Senior career*
| Years | Team | Apps | (Gls) |
| 2014–2021 | Haladás | 116 | (22) |
| 2015 | → Mezőkövesd (loan) | 8 | (2) |
| 2016–2017 | → Dorog (loan) | 38 | (8) |
| 2018–2019 | → Siófok (loan) | 37 | (7) |
| 2021–2024 | Gyirmót | 96 | (18) |
| 2024– | Budapest Honvéd | 58 | (15) |

International career^{‡}
| 2012 | Hungary U17 | 3 | (0) |
| 2013–2014 | Hungary U19 | 5 | (0) |
| 2014 | Hungary U20 | 3 | (0) |
- * Club domestic league appearances and goals as of 31 May 2026 ‡ National team caps and goals as of 13 October 2014

Zoltán Henrik Medgyes (born 23 July 1995) is a Hungarian football player who plays for Budapest Honvéd. He was also part of the Hungarian U-19 at the 2014 UEFA European Under-19 Championship.

== Club statistics ==
| Club | Season | Division | League | | Cup | | League Cup | | Europe | | Total | |
| Club | Season | Division | Apps | Goals | Apps | Goals | Apps | Goals | Apps | Goals | Apps | Goals |
|---|---|---|---|---|---|---|---|---|---|---|---|---|
| Haladás | 2012–13 | NB II | 15 | 4 | — | | 2 | 0 | — | | 17 | 4 |
| Haladás | 2013–14 | NB I | 10 | 0 | 1 | 0 | 2 | 0 | — | | 13 | 0 |
| Haladás | 2014–15 | NB I | 3 | 0 | 1 | 0 | 2 | 0 | — | | 6 | 0 |
| Haladás | 2015–16 | NB I | 27 | 0 | 5 | 0 | — | | — | | 32 | 0 |
| Haladás | 2017–18 | NB I | 9 | 0 | 1 | 1 | — | | — | | 10 | 1 |
| Haladás | 2019–20 | NB II | 20 | 2 | 3 | 3 | — | | — | | 23 | 5 |
| Haladás | 2020–21 | NB II | 32 | 16 | — | | — | | — | | 32 | 16 |
| Haladás | Total | | 116 | 22 | 11 | 4 | 6 | 0 | — | | 133 | 26 |
| Mezőkövesd (loan) | 2014–15 | NB II | 8 | 2 | — | | — | | — | | 8 | 2 |
| Dorog (loan) | 2016–17 | NB II | 38 | 8 | 1 | 0 | — | | — | | 39 | 8 |
| Siófok (loan) | 2018–19 | NB II | 37 | 7 | 1 | 0 | — | | — | | 38 | 7 |
| Gyirmót | 2021–22 | NB I | 29 | 0 | 3 | 1 | — | | — | | 32 | 1 |
| Gyirmót | 2022–23 | NB II | 36 | 9 | 1 | 0 | — | | — | | 37 | 9 |
| Gyirmót | 2023–24 | NB II | 31 | 9 | 2 | 0 | — | | — | | 33 | 9 |
| Gyirmót | Total | | 96 | 18 | 6 | 1 | — | | — | | 102 | 19 |
| Budapest Honvéd | 2024–25 | NB II | 29 | 8 | 2 | 1 | — | | — | | 31 | 9 |
| Budapest Honvéd | 2025–26 | NB II | 22 | 6 | 4 | 1 | — | | — | | 26 | 7 |
| Budapest Honvéd | Total | | 51 | 14 | 6 | 2 | — | | — | | 57 | 16 |
| Career Total | | | 346 | 71 | 25 | 7 | 6 | 0 | — | | 377 | 78 |

Updated to games played as of 22 March 2026.
