= Ménfői úti Stadion =

Sports venue in Hungary

Coordinates: 47.6329°N 17.5927°E

- Alcufer
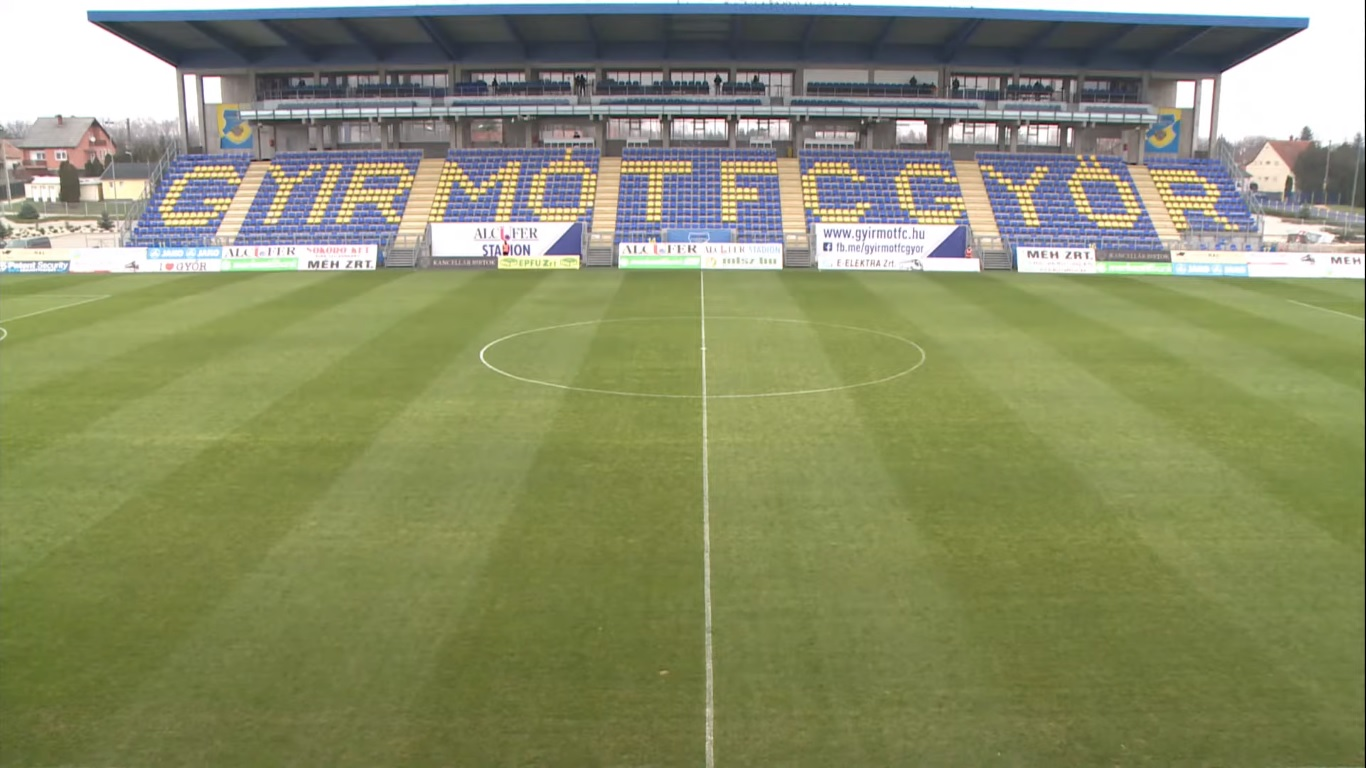
- Interactive map of Ménfői úti Stadion
- Full name: Ménfői úti Stadion
- Location: Győr, Hungary
- Owner: Gyirmót FC Győr
- Capacity: 4,500
- Executive suites: 10 skybox
- Surface: Grass; Field
- Record attendance: 4,000 (Gyirmót vs Dunaújváros, 11 September 2015)
- Field size: 105 m × 68 m (344 ft × 223 ft)

Construction
- Groundbreaking: 2014
- Built: 2014-15
- Opened: 22 September 2015
- Cost: c. 900 million HUF

Tenant
- Gyirmót FC Győr

Website
- www.gyimrotfc.hu

Ménfői úti Stadion or Alcufer Stadion is a sports venue in Gyirmót, a district of Győr, Hungary. The stadium is home to the association football side Gyirmót FC Győr. The stadium has a capacity of 4,500.

== History ==
On 22 September 2015, the stadium was opened. The first match was played against Dunaújváros PASE.

On 25 March 2016, the first international match was played at the stadium. Hungary (U-21) hosted Israel (U-21) in the 2017 UEFA European Under-21 Championship qualification Group 4 match. The final results was a goalless draw.

The stadium was selected to host the 2021 UEFA European Under-21 Championship.

The stadium was used as a home venue by Neman Grodno in the 2023–24 UEFA Europa Conference League starting in the first qualifying round, against Vaduz. Neman Grodno subsequently played in the stadium for their following matchups, against Balzan and NK Celje. The Belarusian club has been using the stadium for their home games ever since, and it is to be used in July 2025 to host the first qualifying round tie against Armenian side FC Urartu.

== Cost ==
The cost of the construction was 900 million HUF.

== Milestone matches ==
24 March 2016	Hungary (U-21)	0–0	Israel (U-21)	2017 UEFA U-21 qualification (First international match)
		Report		Attendance: 800; Referee: Thorarinsson (Iceland)

7 July 2016	MTK Budapest (Hungary)	2–0	(Kazakhstan) Aktobe	2016-17 UEFA Europa League (First UEFA Europa League match)
		Report		Attendance: 601; Referee: Nikolay Yordanov (Bulgaria)

23 July 2016	Gyirmót (Hungary)	0–0	(Hungary) MTK Budapest	2016-17 Nemzeti Bajnokság I (First Nemzeti Bajnokság I match)
		Report		Attendance: 2200; Referee: József Erdős (Hungary)

1 March 2017	Gyirmót (Hungary)	1–1	(Hungary) Mezőkövesd	2016-17 Magyar Kupa (First Magyar Kupa match)
	Simon 75' (p.)	Report	63' Hudák	Attendance: 300; Referee: Sándor Andó-Szabó

25 March 2021
18:00

Russia	v	Iceland
	Report

Ménfői úti Stadion, Győr
