= Gyirmót FC Győr =

Hungarian football club

Gyirmót
- Full name: Gyirmót Futball Club Győr
- Founded: 1993; 33 years ago
- Ground: Ménfői úti Stadion
- Capacity: 4,500
- Chairman: Ernő Horváth
- Manager: Ádám Weitner
- League: NB II
- 2025–26: NB III Northwest, 1st of 16 (promoted via play-offs)
- Website: gyirmotfc.hu
Home colours	Away colours

Gyirmót FC Győr is a Hungarian football club based in Gyirmót [ˈɟirmoːt], a suburb of Győr. The team currently plays in the second division (Nemzeti Bajnokság II) of the Hungarian championship.

== History ==
Former logo, as Gyirmót SE.

The club was founded in 1993 and its colors are yellow and blue.

In the 2014–15 Nemzeti Bajnokság II season Gyirmót could not get promoted to the first division since they collected only two points in their last three matches. On the 28th day they lost at home to Sopron (0–1), drew with Mezőkövesd (2–2), and drew with Siófok (2–2). They finished third in the 2014–15 season.

On 11 July 2015, Gyirmót beat Serie A club A.S. Roma 2–1 in a training match in Pinzolo, Italy.

On 14 May 2016, Gyirmót beat Soproni VSE 3–1 at the Káposztás utcai Stadion in Sopron and won the 2015–16 Nemzeti Bajnokság II season and got promoted to the Nemzeti Bajnokság I for the first time in the club's history.

In the 2020–21 Nemzeti Bajnokság II, Gyirmót finished second and; therefore, they were promoted to the Nemzeti Bajnokság I. Gyirmót could win 13 matches during the second of the season, beating the winners Debreceni VSC away and drawing with Vasas SC away. Since both Vasas and Gyirmót had the same number of points at the end of the seasons, the number of victories counted. According to Nemzeti Sport, the key footballer was László Lencse who scored 11 goals in the season.

On 26 February 2022, Gyirmót drew with Ferencvárosi TC at the Ferencváros Stadion on the 22nd round of the 2021–22 Nemzeti Bajnokság I season.

== Honours ==
- Nemzeti Bajnokság II
  - Winners (1): 2015–16
  - Runners-up (1): 2020–21

== Current squad ==
As of 22 September 2026

Note: Flags indicate national team as defined under FIFA eligibility rules; some limited exceptions apply. Players may hold more than one non-FIFA nationality.

No.	Pos.	Nation	Player
1	GK	HUN	Lőrinc Papp
2	DF	HUN	Vince Szegi
5	DF	HUN	Bence Lányi
6	DF	SRB	Danilo Pejović
8	MF	SVK	Tamás Németh
9	FW	HUN	Zoltán Vasvári
10	MF	HUN	Zsolt Kalmár
12	GK	HUN	Edvárd Rusák
13	MF	HUN	Zsombor Berecz
15	MF	HUN	Norbert Kiss
18	MF	HUN	Ádám Hajdú
19	FW	HUN	Csanád Novák

No.	Pos.	Nation	Player
21	MF	HUN	Márkó Szabó
22	MF	SVK	Alex Iván
23	DF	HUN	Tamás Nagy
24	GK	HUN	Barnabás Kecskés
27	FW	SVK	Ákos Szarka
32	DF	HUN	Sinan Medgyes
70	FW	HUN	Imre Tollár
73	FW	UKR	Yevheniy Kichun
77	FW	HUN	Ádám Miknyóczki
78	MF	HUN	Barnabás Rácz
90	DF	HUN	Dominik Csorba
95	MF	HUN	Márk Madarász

== Seasons ==
The table below shows the seasons of Gyírmót FC.

As of 16 October 2026.

Season	Tier	Club's name	Position	Pts	Manager
1964	7	Gyirmót	10 / 13	5	
1957	6	Gyirmót	0 / 12		
1957–58	6	Gyirmóti SK	1 / 12	28	
1958–59	6	Gyirmót	13 / 13		
1960–61	6	Gyirmót	0 / 10		
1961–62	6	Gyirmót	0 / 8		
1962–63	6	Gyirmót	0 / 6		
1963	6	Gyirmót	8 / 8		
1970	7	Gyirmót	7 / 7	3	
1971–72	6	Gyirmót	13 / 13		
1972–73	7	Gyirmót	6 / 14	32	
1974–75	6	Gyirmót	0 / 8		
1993–94	7	Gyirmót	5 / 14	31	
1994–95	7	Gyirmót SE	1 / 14	59	
1995–96	6	Gyirmót SE	2 / 16	67	
1996–97	6	Gyirmót	1 / 16	69	
1997–98	6	Gyirmót SE	1 / 16	65	
1998–99	5	Gyirmót SE	5 / 18	55	
1999–00	5	Gyirmót SE	4 / 18	70	
2000–01	5	Gyirmót SE	1 / 18	77	
2001–02	5	Gyirmót SE	1 / 16	73	
2002–03	4	Gyirmót SE	1 / 16	69	
2003–04	4	Gyirmót SE	1 / 16	75	
2004–05	3	Gyirmót SE	9 / 16	44	
2005–06	2	Gyirmót SE	3 / 16	57	
2006–07	2	Gyirmót SE	7 / 16	44	
2007–08	2	Gyirmót SE	3 / 16	58	
2008–09	2	Gyirmót SE	1 / 16	67	
2009–10	2	Gyirmót SE	2 / 15	62	
2010–11	2	Gyirmót FC	2 / 16	63	
2011–12	2	Gyirmót FC	3 / 16	52	
2012–13	2	Gyirmót FC Győr	3 / 16	56	
2013–14	2	Gyirmót FC Győr	3 / 16	57	
2014–15	2	Gyirmót FC Győr	3 / 16	59	
2015–16	2	Gyirmót FC Győr	1 / 16	65	
2016–17	1	Gyirmót FC Győr	12 / 12	24	
2017–18	2	Gyirmót FC Győr	6 / 20	59	
2018–19	2	Gyirmót FC Győr	3 / 20	65	
2019–20	2	Gyirmót FC Győr	7 / 20	38	
2020–21	2	Gyirmót FC Győr	2 / 20	78	
2021–22	1	Gyirmót FC Győr	12 / 12	32	
2022–23	2	Gyirmót FC Győr	6 / 20	60	Csaba Csizmadia
2023–24	2	Gyirmót FC Győr	6 / 18	49	
2024–25	2	Gyirmót FC Győr	15 / 16	31	Szabolcs Schindler
2025–26	3	Gyirmót FC Győr	1 / 16	82	Ádám Weitner
