= Aqvital FC Csákvár =

Association football club in Hungary

- Full name: Aqvital Futball Club Csákvár
- Founded: 1947; 79 years ago
- Ground: Tersztyánszky Ödön Sportközpont; Csákvár, Hungary
- Capacity: 2,500
- Chairman: Sándor Nagy
- Manager: Balázs Tóth
- League: NB II
- 2025–26: NB II, 6th of 16
- Website: http://aqvitalfc.hu/
Home colours	Away colours

Aqvital FC Csákvár is a Hungarian football club based in Csákvár, Fejér, that competes in the Nemzeti Bajnokság II, the second tier of Hungarian football league system. The team's colors are yellow and blue.

== History ==
On 14 September 2024, they were eliminated by Mezőkövesdi SE from the 2024–25 Magyar Kupa season. The match ended with a 3-1 defeat at the Mezőkövesdi Városi Stadion.

== Honours ==
- Nemzeti Bajnokság III:
  - Winners (2): 2011–12, 2013–14

== Current squad ==
As of 20 January, 2026

Note: Flags indicate national team as defined under FIFA eligibility rules; some limited exceptions apply. Players may hold more than one non-FIFA nationality.

No.	Pos.	Nation	Player
4	DF	HUN	Márk Helembai
5	DF	HUN	Dániel Karacs
6	DF	HUN	Barna Pál
7	FW	HUN	Áron Fejős
8	MF	HUN	Bence Szabó
10	MF	HUN	Dénes Szakály
11	FW	HUN	Péter Bányai (on loan from Mezőkövesdi)
14	MF	HUN	Aurél Farkas
16	MF	HUN	Dávid Mészáros
17	FW	HUN	András Simon
20	FW	HUN	Viktor Haragos
22	DF	HUN	Péter Szalai
24	MF	HUN	Norbert Dencinger

No.	Pos.	Nation	Player
26	DF	HUN	Ádám Umathum
32	MF	HUN	Márton Radics
33	FW	HUN	Roland Baracskai (captain)
42	MF	HUN	Márton Lorentz
49	DF	HUN	Bence Tifán-Péter
71	FW	HUN	Kristóf Herjeczki
72	GK	HUN	Bendegúz Lehoczki (on loan from Puskás Akadémia)
77	MF	HUN	Bence Ominger
88	GK	HUN	Bence Somodi
92	GK	HUN	András Perczel (on loan from Puskás Akadémia)
99	MF	HUN	Bence Somfalvi (on loan from Puskás Akadémia)

=== Out on loan ===
Note: Flags indicate national team as defined under FIFA eligibility rules; some limited exceptions apply. Players may hold more than one non-FIFA nationality.

No.	Pos.	Nation	Player
18	MF	HUN	Attila Grünfelder (at Bicskei until 30 June 2026)

== Seasons ==
The table below shows the seasons of Csákvári TK.

Season	Tier	Club's name	Position	Pts
1948–49	5	Csákvár	1 / 8	24
1949–50	5	Csákvár	5 / 9	15
1957	4	Csákvár	3 / 8	18
1957–58	4	Csákvári Traktor SK	6 / 15	25
1958–59	4	Csákvári Traktor	10 / 16	28
1959–60	4	Csákvári Traktor	11 / 16	25
1960–61	4	Csákvári MEDOSZ	14 / 16	13
1961–62	5	Csákvári MEDOSZ	1 / 12	34
1962–63	5	Csákvár	3 / 14	28
1963	6	Csákvár	5 / 15	18
1964	7	Csákvár	3 / 14	26
1965	6	Csákvári MEDOSZ	4 / 14	38
1966	6	Csákvár	7 / 9	12
1967	6	Csákvár	4 / 8	15
1968	6	Csákvári MEDOSZ	2 / 8	
1969	6	Csákvári MEDOSZ	5 / 9	15
1970	7	Csákvár	5 / 6	4
1970–71	7	Csákvári MEDOSZ	4 / 11	28
1971–72	7	Csákvár	4 / 10	27
1972–73	7	Csákvári MEDOSZ	1 / 12	40
1973–74	6	Csákvár	11 / 16	25
1974–75	5	Csákvár	7 / 16	29
1975–76	5	Csákvár	14 / 17	24
1976–77	5	Csákvár	8 / 16	34
1977–78	5	Csákvári TC	4 / 14	29
1978–79	4	Csákvári TC	5 / 13	22
1979–80	4	Csákvár	3 / 14	31
1980–81	4	Csákvári TC	2 / 12	33
1981–82	5	Csákvár	3 / 10	26
1982–83	5	Csákvári TC	3 / 12	23
1983–84	5	Csákvár	3 / 11	30
1984–85	5	Csákvár	3 / 12	28
1985–86	5	Csákvár	3 / 9	23
1986–87	5	Csákvár	7 / 14	28
1987–88	5	Csákvár	5 / 15	34
1988–89	5	Csákvár	1 / 16	70
1989–90	4	Csákvár SE	4 / 18	67
1990–91	4	Csákvár	8 / 16	30
1991–92	4	Csákvár	6 / 16	32
1992–93	4	Csákvár	10 / 16	26
1993–94	4	Csákvár	8 / 16	27
1994–95	3	Csákvár-Szentendre	10 / 16	36
1995–96	3	Csákvár FC	3 / 16	61
1996–97	3	Csákvár FC	3 / 16	61
1997–98	3	Csákvári FC	14 / 16	31
1998–99	4	Csákvár FC	6 / 16	48
1999–00	5	Csákvár	4 / 16	48
2000–01	5	Csákvár	9 / 18	44
2001–02	-	-	-	-
2002–03	7	Csákvár	8 / 14	31
2003–04	7	Csákvár	6 / 14	40
2004–05	7	Csákvár	3 / 15	64
2005–06	6	Csákvár	1 / 14	74
2006–07	5	Csákvár	10 / 16	42
2007–08	5	Csákvár	8 / 16	43
2008–09	5	Csákvár	1 / 16	82
2009–10	4	Aqvital Publo Csákvár TK	3 / 16	65
2010–11	4	Aqvital-Publo Csákvár	1 / 16	90
2011–12	3	Aqvital-Publo Csákvári TK	1 / 15	75
2012–13	2	Aqvital-Publo Csákvári TK	9 / 16	44
2013–14	3	Aqvital-Publo Csákvári TK	1 / 16	68
2014–15	2	Aqvital FC Csákvár	12 / 16	32
2015–16	2	Aqvital FC Csákvár	6 / 16	48
2016–17	2	Aqvital FC Csákvár	16 / 20	40
2017–18	2	Aqvital FC Csákvár	11 / 20	47
2018–19	2	Aqvital FC Csákvár	11 / 20	52
2019–20	2	Aqvital FC Csákvár	4 / 20	43
2020–21	2	Aqvital FC Csákvár	17 / 20	38
2021–22	2	Aqvital FC Csákvár	12 / 20	43
2022–23	2	Aqvital FC Csákvár	15 / 20	42
2023–24	2	Aqvital FC Csákvár	12 / 18	43
2024–25	2	Aqvital FC Csákvár	10 / 16	36
2025–26	2	Aqvital FC Csákvár	6 / 16	46
