= 2020–21 Budafoki MTE season =

Budafok
2020–2021 season
- Chairman: Sándor Vízi
- Manager: Csaba Csizmadia (until 25 April 2021); Bálint Pacsi
- Stadium: Promontor utcai Stadion
- NB I: 12th (relegated)
- Hungarian Cup: Quarter-final
- Top goalscorer: League: Dávid Kovács (11); All: Dávid Kovács (12)
- Highest home attendance: 2,000 vs Kisvárda (17 August 2020)
- Lowest home attendance: 650 vs Budapest Honvéd (2 May 2021)
Home colours

The 2020–21 season was Budafoki Munkás Testedző Egyesület's 60th competitive season, 1st consecutive season in the Nemzeti Bajnokság I and 109th year in existence as a football club. In addition to the domestic league, Budafok participated in this season's editions of the Hungarian Cup.

== Transfers ==
=== Summer ===
In: Note: Flags indicate national team as defined under FIFA eligibility rules; some limited exceptions apply. Players may hold more than one non-FIFA nationality.

No.	Pos.	Nation	Player
4	DF	SRB	Marko Nikolić (from (Serbia) Rad Belgrade)
5	MF	HUN	Bálint Oláh (from Mezőkövesd)
17	MF	HUN	Ronald Takács (from (Slovakia) Inter Bratislava)
18	DF	HUN	András Huszti (loan from Puskás Akadémia)
23	DF	SVK	Sinan Medgyes (from Budaörs)
29	GK	HUN	Zoltán Kovács (from Zalaegerszeg)
33	DF	CRO	Marko Iharoš (from Slaven Belupo)
42	GK	HUN	Balázs Bese (loan from MTK Budapest)
72	FW	HUN	Dániel Zsóri (loan from Fehérvár)
77	MF	HUN	Alen Skribek (loan from Puskás Akadémia)
88	MF	HUN	Attila Lőrinczy (from Soroksár)

Out: Note: Flags indicate national team as defined under FIFA eligibility rules; some limited exceptions apply. Players may hold more than one non-FIFA nationality.

No.	Pos.	Nation	Player
2	DF	HUN	Balázs Opavszky (to III. Kerület)
5	MF	HUN	Bálint Oláh (loan return to Mezőkövesd)
6	DF	HUN	Gergő Gohér (to Gyöngyös)
7	FW	HUN	Richárd Zsolnai (loan return to Diósgyőr)
13	MF	SRB	Vladimir Veselinov (retired)
18	MF	HUN	Roland Horváth (to Budaörs)
23	DF	HUN	Martin Króner (to Pécs)
26	FW	HUN	Bálint Farkas (loan to Érd)
29	GK	HUN	Zoltán Kovács (loan return to Zalaegerszeg)
—	FW	HUN	Dániel Földi (to Szabadkikötő)

=== Winter ===
In: Note: Flags indicate national team as defined under FIFA eligibility rules; some limited exceptions apply. Players may hold more than one non-FIFA nationality.

No.	Pos.	Nation	Player
7	DF	HUN	Márió Zeke (loan from Fehérvár)
21	MF	HUN	András Csonka (loan from Ferencváros)
26	DF	HUN	Márk Jagodics (loan from Mezőkövesd)

Out: Note: Flags indicate national team as defined under FIFA eligibility rules; some limited exceptions apply. Players may hold more than one non-FIFA nationality.

No.	Pos.	Nation	Player
7	FW	HUN	Bence Mervó (loan to Szentlőrinc)
21	DF	HUN	Henrik Kirják (to Gyirmót)

=== Nemzeti Bajnokság I ===
==== League table ====
Pos	Team	Pld	W	D	L	GF	GA	GD	Pts	Qualification or relegation
8	Mezőkövesd	33	11	9	13	40	46	−6	42	
9	Zalaegerszeg	33	10	7	16	58	58	0	37	
10	Honvéd	33	9	10	14	46	48	−2	37	
11	Diósgyőr (R)	33	9	6	18	34	53	−19	33	Relegation to the Nemzeti Bajnokság II
12	Budafok (R)	33	7	6	20	34	74	−40	27	Relegation to the Nemzeti Bajnokság II

Source: Hungarian Football Federation (in Hungarian), Soccerway
Rules for classification: 1) Points; 2) Matches won; 3) Goal difference; 4) Goals scored; 5) Head-to-head points; 6) Head-to-head goal difference; 7) Head-to-head away goals scored; 8) Fair play ranking; 9) Drawing of lots.
(R) Relegated

==== Results summary ====
Overall								Home						Away					
Pld	W	D	L	GF	GA	GD	Pts	W	D	L	GF	GA	GD	W	D	L	GF	GA	GD
33	7	6	20	34	74	−40	27	4	2	11	20	40	−20	3	4	9	14	34	−20

Last updated: 15 May 2021.
Source: NB1

==== Results by round ====
Round	1	2	3	4	5	6	7	8	9	10	11	12	13	14	15	16	17	18	19	20	21	22	23	24	25	26	27	28	29	30	31	32	33
Ground	H	A	H	A	H	A	H	A	H	H	A	A	H	A	H	A	H	A	H	A	A	H	H	A	H	A	H	A	H	A	H	H	A
Result	W	D	L	L	L	W	W	W	L	L	L	D	D	L	L	L	D	D	W	L	W	L	W	L	L	L	L	D	L	L	L	L	L
Position	1	4	8	10	11	10	7	4	5	7	8	7	7	7	11	11	11	11	10	11	9	10	9	10	9	11	11	11	11	12	12	12	12

Updated to match(es) played on 15 May 2021. Source: Matches
A = Away; H = Home; W = Win; D = Draw; L = Loss

==== Matches ====
17 August 2020 1	Budafok	2 – 1	Kisvárda	Budapest
19:00 CEST	Kovács 13'; Vaszicsku 80'	Report	Viana 17'	Stadium: Promontor utcai Stadion; Attendance: 2,000; Referee: Csaba Pintér

23 August 2020 2	Újpest	1 – 1	Budafok	Budapest
17:45 CEST	Simon 35'	Report	Zsóri 69'	Stadium: Szusza Ferenc Stadion; Attendance: 2,861; Referee: Péter Zierkelbach

30 August 2020 3	Budafok	1 – 4	Fehérvár	Budapest
17:45 CEST	Skribek 57'	Report	Négo 35', 66'; Nikolić 74'; Petryak 90+1'	Stadium: Promontor utcai Stadion; Attendance: 2,000; Referee: Péter Antal

12 September 2020 4	Mezőkövesd	1 – 0	Budafok	Mezőkövesd
14:45 CEST	Serderov 50'	Report		Stadium: Mezőkövesdi Városi Stadion; Attendance: 1,868; Referee: Ádám Farkas

27 January 2021 5	Budafok	0 – 3	Ferencváros	Budapest
20:00 CET		Report	Uzuni 25' (pen.); Csontos 58'; Kharatin 67' (pen.)	Stadium: Promontor utcai Stadion; Referee: Zoltán Iványi

2 October 2020 6	MTK Budapest	1 – 2	Budafok	Budapest
20:00 CEST	Miovski 73'	Report	Skribek 3'; Ihrig-Farkas 88'	Stadium: Hidegkuti Nándor Stadion; Attendance: 1,573; Referee: Sándor Andó-Szabó

17 October 2020 7	Budafok	2 – 1	Diósgyőr	Budapest
14:45 CEST	Oláh 17'; Ihrig-Farkas 63'	Report	Dražić 72'	Stadium: Promontor utcai Stadion; Attendance: 1,400; Referee: Zoltán Iványi

25 October 2020 8	Zalaegerszeg	1 – 3	Budafok	Zalaegerszeg
14:30 CET	Szalai 10'	Report	Kovács 12'; Kulcsár 22'; Skribek 76'	Stadium: ZTE Arena; Attendance: 1,896; Referee: József Erdős

1 November 2020 9	Budafok	2 – 3	Paks	Budapest
14:05 CET	Ihrig-Farkas 7'; Kovács 27' (pen.)	Report	Sajbán 15'; Hahn 29'; Bognár 42'	Stadium: Promontor utcai Stadion; Attendance: 1,250; Referee: József Erdős

23 December 2020 10	Budafok	1 – 2	Budapest Honvéd	Budapest
20:15 CET	Skribek 1'	Report	Gazdag 45' (pen.); Balogh 68'	Stadium: Promontor utcai Stadion; Attendance: no spectators Referee: Ferenc Karakó

21 November 2020 11	Puskás Akadémia	3 – 0	Budafok	Felcsút
14:45 CET	Knežević 39'; Mance 57', 72'	Report		Stadium: Pancho Aréna; Attendance: no spectators Referee: Ádám Pillók

28 November 2020 12	Kisvárda	0 – 0	Budafok	Kisvárda
14:45 CET		Report		Stadium: Várkerti Stadion; Attendance: no spectators Referee: Péter Zierkelbach

4 December 2020 13	Budafok	1 – 1	Újpest	Budapest
20:15 CET	Kovács 55' (pen.)	Report	Csongvai 59'	Stadium: Promontor utcai Stadion; Attendance: no spectators Referee: Mihály Káprály

12 December 2020 14	Fehérvár	4 – 1	Budafok	Székesfehérvár
19:30 CET	Alef 5'; Petryak 14', 36'; Rus 55'	Report	Kovács 90+2'	Stadium: MOL Aréna Sóstó; Attendance: no spectators Referee: Ádám Farkas

16 December 2020 15	Budafok	0 – 1	Mezőkövesd	Budapest
20:15 CET		Report	Jurina 81'	Stadium: Promontor utcai Stadion; Attendance: no spectators Referee: Péter Antal

19 December 2020 16	Ferencváros	2 – 1	Budafok	Budapest
19:30 CET	Lovrencsics 57'; Kharatin 62' (pen.)	Report	Zsóri 75'	Stadium: Groupama Arena; Attendance: no spectators Referee: Péter Solymosi

24 January 2021 17	Budafok	2 – 2	MTK Budapest	Budapest
13:30 CET	Skribek 6'; Csonka 53'	Report	Schön 2'; Varga 27'	Stadium: Promontor utcai Stadion; Attendance: no spectators Referee: Gergő Bogár

31 January 2021 18	Diósgyőr	1 – 1	Budafok	Miskolc
16:15 CET	Vaněček 40'	Report	Kulcsár 90+5'	Stadium: DVTK Stadion; Attendance: no spectators Referee: Tamás Bognár

3 February 2021 19	Budafok	3 – 1	Zalaegerszeg	Budapest
20:00 CET	Zsóri 40'; Kovács 49', 51'	Report	Lesjak 80'	Stadium: Promontor utcai Stadion; Attendance: no spectators Referee: Sándor Andó-Szabó

7 February 2021 20	Paks	4 – 1	Budafok	Paks
14:10 CET	Jagodics 3' (o.g.); Szabó 19'; Hahn 55' (pen.); Szendrei 90+2'	Report	Takács 62'	Stadium: Fehérvári úti Stadion; Attendance: no spectators Referee: Ádám Pillók

13 February 2021 21	Budapest Honvéd	2 – 3	Budafok	Budapest
19:30 CET	Gazdag 37'; Bőle 40'	Report	Kovács 28'; Szendrei 51' (o.g.); Ihrig-Farkas 90+2'	Stadium: Hidegkuti Nándor Stadion; Attendance: no spectators Referee: Péter Solymosi

21 February 2021 22	Budafok	0 – 3	Puskás Akadémia	Budapest
14:30 CET		Report	Băluță 3'; Slagveer 64'; Mance 90+2'	Stadium: Promontor utcai Stadion; Attendance: no spectators Referee: Gergő Bogár

27 February 2021 23	Budafok	2 – 0	Kisvárda	Budapest
14:45 CET	Ihrig-Farkas 69'; Kovács 70'	Report		Stadium: Promontor utcai Stadion; Attendance: no spectators Referee: Mihály Káprály

3 March 2021 24	Újpest	2 – 0	Budafok	Budapest
17:30 CET	Mitrović 90'; Perošević 90+1'	Report		Stadium: Szusza Ferenc Stadion; Attendance: no spectators Referee: Csaba Pintér

7 March 2021 25	Budafok	1 – 2	Fehérvár	Budapest
20:00 CET	Skribek 41'	Report	Zivzivadze 17'; Zsóri 84' (o.g.)	Stadium: Promontor utcai Stadion; Attendance: no spectators Referee: Péter Zierkelbach

14 March 2021 26	Mezőkövesd	2 – 1	Budafok	Mezőkövesd
14:05 CET	Cseri 13'; Vojtuš 60'	Report	Kovács 36' (pen.)	Stadium: Mezőkövesdi Városi Stadion; Attendance: no spectators Referee: Balázs Berke

4 April 2021 27	Budafok	0 – 4	Ferencváros	Budapest
17:00 CEST		Report	Uzuni 55' (pen.); Boli 61'; Sigér 88'; Kharaishvili 90'	Stadium: Promontor utcai Stadion; Attendance: no spectators Referee: Ádám Farkas

10 April 2021 28	MTK Budapest	0 – 0	Budafok	Budapest
14:45 CEST		Report		Stadium: Hidegkuti Nándor Stadion; Attendance: no spectators Referee: Péter Solymosi

16 April 2021 29	Budafok	1 – 2	Diósgyőr	Budapest
18:00 CEST	Kovács 52'	Report	Suljić 18', 57'	Stadium: Promontor utcai Stadion; Attendance: no spectators Referee: Balázs Berke

20 April 2021 30	Zalaegerszeg	5 – 0	Budafok	Zalaegerszeg
17:30 CEST	Koszta 35' (pen.), 37'; Szánthó 57'; Favorov 67'; Futács 89'	Report		Stadium: ZTE Arena; Attendance: no spectators Referee: Gergő Bogár

25 April 2021 31	Budafok	2 – 9	Paks	Budapest
14:30 CEST	Medgyes 15'; Takács 43'	Report	Nagy 17'; Papp 27'; Hahn 38', 55', 90+1'; Ádám 45'; Bognár 58', 73'; Szabó 71'	Stadium: Promontor utcai Stadion; Attendance: no spectators Referee: Tamás Bognár

2 May 2021 32	Budafok	0 – 1	Budapest Honvéd	Budapest
17:00 CEST		Report	Mezghrani 53'	Stadium: Promontor utcai Stadion; Attendance: 650; Referee: István Vad

9 May 2021 33	Puskás Akadémia	5 – 0	Budafok	Felcsút
17:30 CEST	Nagy 8', 16'; Knežević 15'; Slagveer 34'; Spandler 73'	Report		Stadium: Pancho Aréna; Attendance: 600; Referee: Csaba Pintér

=== Hungarian Cup ===
19 September 2020 Round 6	Mohács	0 – 6	Budafok	Mohács
15:00 CEST		Report	Ihrig-Farkas 23', 73'; Zsóri 38' (pen.), 84'; Marton 47' (o.g.); Kulcsár 50'	Stadium: Városi Sportpálya; Referee: Gábor Barna

28 October 2020 Round of 64	Dabas-Gyón	2 – 3 (a.e.t.)	Budafok	Dabas
12:30 CET	Karacs 19'; Ablonczy 90' (pen.)	Report	Szabó 16'; Kovács 57'; Ihrig-Farkas 117'	Stadium: Városi Sportpálya; Referee: Réka Molnár

10 February 2021 Round of 32	Dunavarsány	0 – 11	Budafok	Dunavarsány
13:00 CET		Report	Romić 12'; Szabó 29', 40', 44'; Zsóri 47', 65'; Ihrig-Farkas 55', 58'; Khiesz 80'; Lőrinczy 88'; Kulcsár 90+2'	Stadium: Városi Sporttelep; Attendance: x Referee: Tamás Nazsa

24 February 2021 Round of 16	Paks	2 – 4	Budafok	Paks
13:00 CET	Nagy 15'; Vaszicsku 34' (o.g.)	Report	Skribek 25', 38', 45'; Zsóri 90+3'	Stadium: Fehérvári úti Stadion; Attendance: x Referee: Szabolcs Szilasi

10 March 2021 Quarter-final	Fehérvár	2 – 0	Budafok	Székesfehérvár
14:30 CET	Romić 68' (o.g.); Stopira 78'	Report		Stadium: MOL Aréna Sóstó; Attendance: x Referee: Péter Solymosi

== Statistics ==
=== Appearances and goals ===
Last updated on 15 May 2021.

No.	Pos	Nat	Player	Total		Nemzeti Bajnokság I		Hungarian Cup	
No.	Pos	Nat	Player	Apps	Goals	Apps	Goals	Apps	Goals
1	GK	(Hungary) HUN	Dániel Póser	24	-53	23	-51	1	-2
3	DF	(Hungary) HUN	Andor Margitics	22	0	20	0	2	0
4	DF	(Serbia) SRB	Marko Nikolić	21	0	16	0	5	0
5	MF	(Hungary) HUN	Bálint Oláh	37	1	32	1	5	0
7	DF	(Hungary) HUN	Márió Zeke	14	0	13	0	1	0
8	MF	(Hungary) HUN	Máté Fekete	7	0	4	0	3	0
9	MF	(Hungary) HUN	Sebestyén Ihrig-Farkas	33	10	28	5	5	5
10	FW	(Hungary) HUN	Dávid Kovács	38	12	33	11	5	1
11	MF	(Hungary) HUN	Miklós Micsinai	27	0	22	0	5	0
16	MF	(Hungary) HUN	Attila Filkor	18	0	18	0	0	0
17	MF	(Hungary) HUN	Ronald Takács	22	2	21	2	1	0
18	DF	(Hungary) HUN	András Huszti	30	0	25	0	5	0
19	DF	(Croatia) CRO	Danijel Romić	23	1	19	0	4	1
20	MF	(Hungary) HUN	Kornél Kulcsár	35	4	30	2	5	2
21	MF	(Hungary) HUN	András Csonka	18	1	18	1	0	0
22	DF	(Hungary) HUN	Kornél Khiesz	2	1	1	0	1	1
23	DF	(Slovakia) SVK	Sinan Medgyes	30	1	26	1	4	0
24	MF	(Hungary) HUN	István Soltész	6	0	5	0	1	0
26	DF	(Hungary) HUN	Márk Jagodics	14	0	14	0	0	0
29	GK	(Hungary) HUN	Zoltán Kovács	2	-6	2	-6	0	0
33	DF	(Croatia) CRO	Marko Iharoš	6	0	5	0	1	0
42	GK	(Hungary) HUN	Balázs Bese	12	-21	8	-17	4	-4
51	DF	(Hungary) HUN	Zsolt Venczel	1	0	1	0	0	0
72	FW	(Hungary) HUN	Dániel Zsóri	26	8	21	3	5	5
77	MF	(Hungary) HUN	Alen Skribek	30	9	26	6	4	3
88	FW	(Hungary) HUN	Attila Lőrinczy	20	1	19	0	1	1
91	DF	(Hungary) HUN	Gergő Vaszicsku	12	1	10	1	2	0
99	FW	(Hungary) HUN	Máté Szabó	35	4	30	0	5	4
Out to loan:
7	FW	(Hungary) HUN	Bence Mervó	4	0	3	0	1	0
Players no longer at the club:
21	DF	(Hungary) HUN	Henrik Kirják	3	0	1	0	2	0

=== Top scorers ===
Includes all competitive matches. The list is sorted by shirt number when total goals are equal.

Last updated on 15 May 2021

Position	Nation	Number	Name	Nemzeti Bajnokság I	Hungarian Cup	Total
1	(Hungary)	10	Dávid Kovács	11	1	12
2	(Hungary)	9	Sebestyén Ihrig-Farkas	5	5	10
3	(Hungary)	77	Alen Skribek	6	3	9
4	(Hungary)	72	Dániel Zsóri	3	5	8
5	(Hungary)	20	Kornél Kulcsár	2	2	4
6	(Hungary)	99	Máté Szabó	0	4	4
7	(Hungary)	17	Ronald Takács	2	0	2
8	(Hungary)	91	Gergő Vaszicsku	1	0	1
9	(Hungary)	5	Bálint Oláh	1	0	1
10	(Hungary)	21	András Csonka	1	0	1
11	(Slovakia)	23	Sinan Medgyes	1	0	1
12	(Croatia)	19	Danijel Romić	0	1	1
13	(Hungary)	22	Kornél Khiesz	0	1	1
14	(Hungary)	88	Attila Lőrinczy	0	1	1
			Own Goals	1	1	2
			TOTALS	34	24	58

=== Disciplinary record ===
Includes all competitive matches. Players with 1 card or more included only.

Last updated on 15 May 2021

Position	Nation	Number	Name	Nemzeti Bajnokság I		Hungarian Cup		Total (Hu Total)	
Position	Nation	Number	Name	Yellow card	Red card	Yellow card	Red card	Yellow card	Red card
GK	(Hungary)	1	Dániel Póser	1	0	0	0	1 (1)	0 (0)
DF	(Hungary)	3	Andor Margitics	3	0	0	0	3 (3)	0 (0)
DF	(Serbia)	4	Marko Nikolić	3	1	2	0	5 (3)	1 (1)
MF	(Hungary)	5	Bálint Oláh	7	0	0	0	7 (7)	0 (0)
DF	(Hungary)	7	Márió Zeke	5	0	0	0	5 (5)	0 (0)
FW	(Hungary)	7	Bence Mervó	0	0	1	0	1 (0)	0 (0)
MF	(Hungary)	9	Sebestyén Ihrig-Farkas	3	0	0	0	3 (3)	0 (0)
MF	(Hungary)	11	Miklós Micsinai	3	0	1	0	4 (3)	0 (0)
MF	(Hungary)	16	Attila Filkor	6	0	0	0	6 (6)	0 (0)
MF	(Hungary)	17	Ronald Takács	4	0	0	0	4 (4)	0 (0)
DF	(Hungary)	18	András Huszti	5	2	1	0	6 (5)	2 (2)
DF	(Croatia)	19	Danijel Romić	5	0	0	0	5 (5)	0 (0)
MF	(Hungary)	20	Kornél Kulcsár	3	1	1	0	4 (3)	1 (1)
MF	(Hungary)	21	András Csonka	3	0	0	0	3 (3)	0 (0)
DF	(Hungary)	21	Henrik Kirják	0	0	1	0	1 (0)	0 (0)
DF	(Slovakia)	23	Sinan Medgyes	1	0	0	0	1 (1)	0 (0)
MF	(Hungary)	24	István Soltész	0	0	1	0	1 (0)	0 (0)
DF	(Hungary)	26	Márk Jagodics	5	0	0	0	5 (5)	0 (0)
GK	(Hungary)	29	Zoltán Kovács	1	0	0	0	1 (1)	0 (0)
GK	(Hungary)	42	Balázs Bese	1	0	1	0	2 (1)	0 (0)
FW	(Hungary)	72	Dániel Zsóri	3	0	2	0	5 (3)	0 (0)
DF	(Hungary)	91	Gergő Vaszicsku	3	0	0	0	3 (3)	0 (0)
FW	(Hungary)	99	Máté Szabó	2	0	0	0	2 (2)	0 (0)
			TOTALS	67	4	11	0	78 (67)	4 (4)

=== Overall ===
Games played	38 (33 Nemzeti Bajnokság I and 5 Hungarian Cup)
Games won	11 (7 Nemzeti Bajnokság I and 4 Hungarian Cup)
Games drawn	6 (6 Nemzeti Bajnokság I and 0 Hungarian Cup)
Games lost	21 (20 Nemzeti Bajnokság I and 1 Hungarian Cup)
Goals scored	58
Goals conceded	80
Goal difference	-22
Yellow cards	78
Red cards	4
Worst discipline	(Hungary) András Huszti (6 (yellow card) , 2 (red card) )
Best result	11–0 (A) v Dunavarsány - Hungarian Cup - 10-2-2021
Worst result	2–9 (H) v Paks - Nemzeti Bajnokság I - 24-4-2021
Most appearances	(Hungary) Dávid Kovács (38 appearances)
Top scorer	(Hungary) Dávid Kovács (12 goals)
Points	39/114 (34.21%)

Last updated: 15 May 2021
