= 2019–20 Budafoki MTE season =

Budafok
2019–20 season
- Chairman: Sándor Vízi
- Manager: Csaba Csizmadia
- Stadium: Promontor utcai Stadion
- NB 2: Runners-up
- Hungarian Cup: Round of 32
- Top goalscorer: League: Dávid Kovács (18); All: Dávid Kovács (15)
- Highest home attendance: 800 vs Ajka (15 September 2019)
- Lowest home attendance: 300 vs Siófok (1 December 2019)
Home colours

The 2019–20 season was Budafoki Munkás Testedző Egyesület's 59th competitive season, 3rd consecutive season in the Nemzeti Bajnokság II and 108th year in existence as a football club. In addition to the domestic league, Budafok participated in this season's editions of the Hungarian Cup.

== First team ==
Note: Flags indicate national team as defined under FIFA eligibility rules; some limited exceptions apply. Players may hold more than one non-FIFA nationality.

No.	Pos.	Nation	Player
1	GK	HUN	Dániel Póser
2	DF	HUN	Blázs Opavszky
3	DF	HUN	Andor Margitics
5	MF	HUN	Bálint Oláh
6	DF	HUN	Gergő Gohér
7	FW	HUN	Richárd Zsolnai
8	FW	HUN	Máté Fekete
9	MF	HUN	Sebestyén Ihrig-Farkas
10	FW	HUN	Dávid Kovács (captain)
11	MF	HUN	Miklós Micsinai
13	MF	SRB	Vladimir Veselinov
14	FW	HUN	Bence Mervó
15	MF	HUN	Alen Skribek
16	MF	HUN	Attila Filkor

No.	Pos.	Nation	Player
17	DF	HUN	Gergő Vaszicsku
18	FW	HUN	Roland Horváth
19	MF	CRO	Danijel Romić
20	MF	HUN	Kornél Kulcsár
21	DF	HUN	Henrik Kirják
22	DF	HUN	Kornél Khiesz
23	DF	HUN	Martin Króner
24	MF	HUN	István Soltész
25	FW	HUN	Máté Szabó
26	FW	HUN	Bálint Farkas
27	FW	HUN	Dániel Harsányi
29	GK	HUN	Zoltán Kovács
30	GK	HUN	Bálint Olasz

== Transfers ==
=== Summer ===
In: Note: Flags indicate national team as defined under FIFA eligibility rules; some limited exceptions apply. Players may hold more than one non-FIFA nationality.

No.	Pos.	Nation	Player
2	DF	HUN	Balázs Opavszky (from Paks II)
19	DF	CRO	Danijel Romić (from Pécs)
24	MF	HUN	István Soltész (from Kelen)
25	MF	HUN	Máté Szabó (from Puskás Akadémia II)
26	FW	HUN	Bálint Farkas (from Budafok U-19)
27	FW	HUN	Dániel Harsányi (from Budafok U-19)
30	GK	HUN	Bálint Olasz (from Budafok U-19)

Out: Note: Flags indicate national team as defined under FIFA eligibility rules; some limited exceptions apply. Players may hold more than one non-FIFA nationality.

No.	Pos.	Nation	Player
6	DF	HUN	Zoltán Gubacsi (to ESMTK)
8	MF	HUN	Bence Vég (to Mohács)
11	DF	HUN	Csanád Horváth (to Dabas–Gyón)
20	MF	HUN	Bence Kercsó (to Kazincbarcika)
26	DF	HUN	Imre Patkós (to Szabadkikötő)
60	FW	HUN	Péter Pölöskei (to Soroksár)
94	GK	HUN	Péter Balogh (to Kelen)

=== Winter ===
In: Note: Flags indicate national team as defined under FIFA eligibility rules; some limited exceptions apply. Players may hold more than one non-FIFA nationality.

No.	Pos.	Nation	Player
7	FW	HUN	Richárd Zsolnai (loan from Diósgyőr)
11	DF	HUN	Csanád Horváth (loan return from Dabas–Gyón)
15	MF	HUN	Alen Skribek (loan from Puskás Akadémia)

Out: Note: Flags indicate national team as defined under FIFA eligibility rules; some limited exceptions apply. Players may hold more than one non-FIFA nationality.

No.	Pos.	Nation	Player
7	MF	HUN	Imre Vankó (to Szeged)
11	DF	HUN	Csanád Horváth (to Ménfőcsanak)
15	MF	HUN	Máté Vass (to Szabadkikötő)

== Nemzeti Bajnokság II ==
=== League table ===
Pos	Team	Pld	W	D	L	GF	GA	GD	Pts	Promotion or relegation
1	MTK Budapest (C, P)	27	18	5	4	60	33	+27	59	Promotion to Nemzeti Bajnokság I
2	Budafok (P)	27	16	6	5	42	23	+19	54	Promotion to Nemzeti Bajnokság I
3	Vasas	27	14	5	8	55	39	+16	47	
4	Csákvár	26	13	4	9	40	43	−3	43	
5	Siófok	26	11	9	6	40	31	+9	42	

Updated to match(es) played on 14 March 2020. Source:
Rules for classification: 1st points; 2nd overall wins; 3rd goal difference; 4th head-to-head points; 5th head-to-head goal difference; 6th head-to-head away goals scored; 7th fair-play points; 8th drawing of lots
(C) Champions; (P) Promoted

=== Results summary ===
Overall								Home						Away					
Pld	W	D	L	GF	GA	GD	Pts	W	D	L	GF	GA	GD	W	D	L	GF	GA	GD
27	16	6	5	42	23	+19	54	7	5	2	19	11	+8	9	1	3	23	12	+11

Last updated: 14 March 2020.
Source: NB2

=== Results by round ===
Round	1	2	3	4	5	6	7	8	9	10	11	12	13	14	15	16	17	18	19	20	21	22	23	24	25	26	27	28	29	30	31	32	33	34	35	36	37	38
Ground	A	H	A	H	A	H	A	H	A	H	A	H	A	H	A	H	H	A	H	H	A	H	A	H	A	H	A	H	A	H	A	H	A	H	A	A	H	A
Result	W	W	L	L	W	W	W	L	W	D	W	W	L	W	W	X	W	D	D	W	W	D	W	D	W	W	L	D	X	X	X	X	X	X	X	X	X	X
Position	1	1	3	7	4	2	1	3	3	4	2	1	2	1	1	2	2	2	2	2	2	2	2	2	2	2	2	2	2	2	2	2	2	2	2	2	2	2

Updated to match(es) played on 30 June 2020. Source: Matches
A = Away; H = Home; W = Win; D = Draw; L = Loss

=== Matches ===
4 August 2019 1	Szeged	0 – 3	Budafok	Gyula
17:30 CEST		Report	D. Kovács 6' (pen.); Kulcsár 19' (pen.); Szabó 43'	Stadium: Városi Sportpálya; Attendance: 250; Referee: János Takács

7 August 2019 2	Budafok	3 – 0	Szolnok	Budapest
19:00 CEST	Szabó 42'; Horváth 53'; Vankó 77'	Report		Stadium: Promontor utcai Stadion; Attendance: 400; Referee: Roland Veizer

11 August 2019 3	Csákvár	2 – 1	Budafok	Csákvár
19:00 CEST	Baracskai 27'; Mészáros 57'	Report	Szabó 34'	Stadium: Tersztyánszky Ödön Sportközpont; Attendance: 600; Referee: Tamás Móri

18 August 2019 4	Budafok	2 – 3	Budaörs	Budapest
19:00 CEST	Horváth 21'; D. Kovács 52' (pen.)	Report	Tóth 12'; Szabó 45'; Kulcsár 72'	Stadium: Promontor utcai Stadion; Attendance: 500; Referee: Péter Zierkelbach

25 August 2019 5	Dorog	1 – 2	Budafok	Dorog
17:30 CEST	Paudits 4'	Report	Romić 24'; Oláh 43'	Stadium: Buzánszky Jenő Stadion; Attendance: 600; Referee: Gergely Kovács

28 August 2019 6	Budafok	1 – 0	Soroksár	Budapest
19:00 CEST	Soltész 8'	Report		Stadium: Promontor utcai Stadion; Attendance: 500; Referee: Bence Hanyecz

1 September 2019 7	Békéscsaba	0 – 3	Budafok	Békéscsaba
17:00 CEST		Report	Vaszicsku 17'; D. Kovács 26'; Ihrig-Farkas 62'	Stadium: Kórház utcai Stadion; Attendance: 1,210; Referee: Sándor Szilágyi

15 September 2019 8	Budafok	1 – 3	Ajka	Budapest
17:00 CEST	Szabó 37'	Report	Csizmadia 10'; Nagy 71'; Csemer 76'	Stadium: Promontor utcai Stadion; Attendance: 800; Referee: Ákos Gaál

8 September 2019 9	Tiszakécske	2 – 3	Budafok	Tiszakécske
16:00 CEST	Puskás 5', 44'	Report	Ihrig-Farkas 17'; D. Kovács 52' (pen.); Kulcsár 62'	Stadium: Városi Sportpálya; Attendance: 450; Referee: Márton Rúsz

29 September 2019 10	Budafok	2 – 2	Kazincbarcika	Budapest
17:00 CEST	D. Kovács 6'; Szabó 18'	Report	Fótyik 57' (pen.); Oldal 69'	Stadium: Promontor utcai Stadion; Attendance: 700; Referee: Tamás Nazsa

27 November 2019 11	Vasas	0 – 2	Budafok	Budapest
18:00 CET		Report	D. Kovács 53' (pen.), 71'	Stadium: Illovszky Rudolf Stadion; Attendance: 500; Referee: László Lovas

6 October 2019 12	Budafok	2 – 0	Nyíregyháza	Budapest
17:00 CEST	D. Kovács 16' (pen.), 76' (pen.)	Report		Stadium: Promontor utcai Stadion; Attendance: 350; Referee: Attila Molnár

20 October 2019 13	MTK Budapest	2 – 1	Budafok	Budapest
18:00 CEST	Katona 19'; Lencse 73'	Report	Micsinai 7'	Stadium: Hidegkuti Nándor Stadion; Attendance: 1,983; Referee: János Takács

27 October 2019 14	Budafok	2 – 0	Vác	Budapest
17:00 CET	Gohér 63'; Szabó 77'	Report		Stadium: Promontor utcai Stadion; Attendance: 400; Referee: Péter Antal

3 November 2019 15	Győr	1 – 3	Budafok	Győr
17:00 CET	Lovrencsics 76'	Report	Ihrig-Farkas 9'; D. Kovács 66' (pen.); Szabó 90+1'	Stadium: ETO Park; Attendance: 1,120; Referee: Norbert Nagy

6 November 2019 16	Budafok	–	Balmazújváros	Budapest
19:00 CET		[ Report]		Stadium: Promontor utcai Stadion

10 November 2019 17	Budafok	1 – 0	Szombathely	Budapest
17:00 CET	Horváth 2'	Report		Stadium: Promontor utcai Stadion; Attendance: 350; Referee: Tibor Horváth

24 November 2019 18	Gyirmót	1 – 1	Budafok	Győr
17:00 CET	Széles 44'	Report	D. Kovács 79'	Stadium: Alcufer Stadion; Attendance: 496; Referee: Róbert Nagy

1 December 2019 19	Budafok	0 – 0	Siófok	Budapest
13:00 CET		Report		Stadium: Promontor utcai Stadion; Attendance: 300; Referee: Márió Görög

8 December 2019 20	Budafok	1 – 0	Szeged	Budapest
13:00 CET	Kulcsár 73'	Report		Stadium: Promontor utcai Stadion; Attendance: 350; Referee: Marcell Derdák

15 December 2019 21	Szolnok	0 – 1	Budafok	Szolnok
13:00 CET		Report	D. Kovács 51'	Stadium: Tiszaligeti Stadion; Attendance: 600; Referee: Bence Hanyecz

2 February 2020 22	Budafok	1 – 1	Csákvár	Budapest
14:00 CET	Skribek 72'	Report	Mim 85'	Stadium: Promontor utcai Stadion; Attendance: 500; Referee: Mihály Káprály

9 February 2020 23	Budaörs	0 – 1	Budafok	Tatabánya
14:00 CET		Report	Skribek 57'	Stadium: Grosics Gyula Stadion; Attendance: 200; Referee: Gábor Barna

16 February 2020 24	Budafok	0 – 0	Dorog	Budapest
14:00 CET		Report		Stadium: Promontor utcai Stadion; Attendance: 400; Referee: Szabolcs Szilasi

23 February 2020 25	Soroksár	1 – 2	Budafok	Budapest
14:00 CET	Szánthó 17'	Report	D. Kovács 86' (pen.); Romić 90+5'	Stadium: Szamosi Mihály Sporttelep; Attendance: 500; Referee: Ádám Radványi

1 March 2020 26	Budafok	3 – 2	Békéscsaba	Budapest
14:30 CET	D. Kovács 34', 61'; Szabó 77'	Report	Lukács 10'; Gréczi 90'	Stadium: Promontor utcai Stadion; Attendance: 350; Referee: Marcell Derdák

8 March 2020 27	Ajka	2 – 0	Budafok	Ajka
17:00 CET	Zamostny 31'; Tóth 90+4'	Report		Stadium: Városi Stadion; Attendance: 1,000; Referee: Zoltán J. Kovács

14 March 2020 28	Budafok	0 – 0	Tiszakécske	Budapest
14:30 CET		Report		Stadium: Promontor utcai Stadion; Attendance: no spectators Referee: Roland Veizer

30 June 2020 29	Kazincbarcika	–	Budafok	Kazincbarcika
CEST		[ Report]		Stadium: Pete András Stadion

30 June 2020 30	Budafok	–	Vasas	Budapest
14:30 CEST		[ Report]		Stadium: Promontor utcai Stadion

30 June 2020 31	Nyíregyháza	–	Budafok	Nyíregyháza
CEST		[ Report]		Stadium: Városi Stadion

30 June 2020 32	Budafok	–	MTK Budapest	Budapest
14:30 CEST		[ Report]		Stadium: Promontor utcai Stadion

30 June 2020 33	Vác	–	Budafok	Vác
CEST		[ Report]		Stadium: Ligeti Stadion

30 June 2020 34	Budafok	–	Győr	Budapest
14:30 CEST		[ Report]		Stadium: Promontor utcai Stadion

30 June 2020 35	Balmazújváros	–	Budafok	Balmazújváros
CEST		[ Report]		Stadium: Városi Sportpálya

30 June 2020 36	Szombathely	–	Budafok	Szombathely
CEST		[ Report]		Stadium: Haladás Sportkomplexum

30 June 2020 37	Budafok	–	Gyirmót	Budapest
14:30 CEST		[ Report]		Stadium: Promontor utcai Stadion

30 June 2020 38	Siófok	–	Budafok	Siófok
CEST		[ Report]		Stadium: Révész Géza utcai Stadion

== Hungarian Cup ==
22 September 2019 6th round	Törökszentmiklós	0 – 5	Budafok	Törökszentmiklós
15:00 CEST		Report	D. Kovács 4' (pen.), 88'; Szabó 51'; Gohér 55', 65'	Stadium: Városi Sportpálya; Attendance: 300; Referee: Bence Hanyecz

30 October 2019 7th round	Sopron	1 – 1 (6 – 7 p)	Budafok	Sopron
18:00 CET	Kocsis 6'	Report	D. Kovács 20'	Stadium: Káposztás utcai Stadion; Attendance: 250; Referee: Ádám Radványi
	Penalties
	P.Tóth (penalty scored); A.Tóth (penalty scored); ? (penalty missed); Krizsonits (penalty scored); Galambos (penalty scored); Gere (penalty scored); Baranyai (penalty scored); ? (penalty missed)		(penalty scored) Gohér; (penalty scored) Romić; (penalty scored) Ihrig-Farkas; (penalty scored) Szabó; (penalty missed) ?; (penalty scored) Horváth; (penalty scored) Opavszky; (penalty scored) Micsinai

4 December 2019 Round of 32	Szombathely	2 – 1	Budafok	Szombathely
15:30 CEST	Kiss 83'; Szalay 86'	Report	Romić 9'	Stadium: Haladás Sportkomplexum; Attendance: 450; Referee: Szabolcs Szilasi

== Statistics ==
=== Appearances and goals ===
Last updated on 14 March 2020.

No.	Pos	Nat	Player	Total		Merkantil Bank Liga		Hungarian Cup	
No.	Pos	Nat	Player	Apps	Goals	Apps	Goals	Apps	Goals
1	GK	(Hungary) HUN	Dániel Póser	17	-9	15	-8	2	-1
2	DF	(Hungary) HUN	Balázs Opavszky	20	0	18	0	2	0
3	DF	(Hungary) HUN	Andor Margitics	19	0	17	0	2	0
5	MF	(Hungary) HUN	Bálint Oláh	27	1	26	1	1	0
6	DF	(Hungary) HUN	Gergő Gohér	15	3	13	1	2	2
7	FW	(Hungary) HUN	Richárd Zsolnai	7	0	7	0	0	0
8	FW	(Hungary) HUN	Máté Fekete	3	0	2	0	1	0
9	MF	(Hungary) HUN	Sebestyén Ihrig-Farkas	20	3	18	3	2	0
10	FW	(Hungary) HUN	Dávid Kovács	29	18	26	15	3	3
11	MF	(Hungary) HUN	Miklós Micsinai	15	1	12	1	3	0
13	MF	(Serbia) SRB	Vladimir Veselinov	5	0	3	0	2	0
14	FW	(Hungary) HUN	Bence Mervó	2	0	2	0	0	0
15	MF	(Hungary) HUN	Alen Skribek	7	2	7	2	0	0
16	MF	(Hungary) HUN	Attila Filkor	19	0	17	0	2	0
17	DF	(Hungary) HUN	Gergő Vaszicsku	17	1	16	1	1	0
18	MF	(Hungary) HUN	Roland Horváth	20	3	18	3	2	0
19	DF	(Croatia) CRO	Danijel Romić	28	3	25	2	3	1
20	MF	(Hungary) HUN	Kornél Kulcsár	22	3	21	3	1	0
21	DF	(Hungary) HUN	Henrik Kirják	19	0	18	0	1	0
22	DF	(Hungary) HUN	Kornél Khiesz	2	0	2	0	0	0
23	DF	(Hungary) HUN	Martin Króner	12	0	10	0	2	0
24	MF	(Hungary) HUN	István Soltész	21	1	20	1	1	0
25	FW	(Hungary) HUN	Máté Szabó	29	9	26	8	3	1
26	FW	(Hungary) HUN	Bálint Farkas	8	0	6	0	2	0
27	FW	(Hungary) HUN	Dániel Harsányi	0	0	0	0	0	0
29	GK	(Hungary) HUN	Zoltán Kovács	13	-17	12	-15	1	-2
30	GK	(Hungary) HUN	Bálint Olasz	0	0	0	-0	0	0
Players no longer at the club:
7	MF	(Hungary) HUN	Imre Vankó	18	1	15	1	3	0
15	MF	(Hungary) HUN	Máté Vass	1	0	1	0	0	0

=== Top scorers ===
Includes all competitive matches. The list is sorted by shirt number when total goals are equal.

Last updated on 14 March 2020

Position	Nation	Number	Name	Merkantil Bank Liga	Hungarian Cup	Total
1	(Hungary)	10	Dávid Kovács	15	3	18
2	(Hungary)	25	Máté Szabó	8	1	9
3	(Hungary)	9	Sebestyén Ihrig-Farkas	3	0	3
4	(Hungary)	18	Roland Horváth	3	0	3
5	(Hungary)	20	Kornél Kulcsár	3	0	3
6	(Croatia)	19	Danijel Romić	2	1	3
7	(Hungary)	6	Gergő Gohér	1	2	3
8	(Hungary)	15	Alen Skribek	2	0	2
9	(Hungary)	7	Imre Vankó	1	0	1
10	(Hungary)	5	Bálint Oláh	1	0	1
11	(Hungary)	24	István Soltész	1	0	1
12	(Hungary)	17	Gergő Vaszicsku	1	0	1
13	(Hungary)	11	Miklós Micsinai	1	0	1
/	/	/	Own Goals	0	0	0
			TOTALS	42	7	49

=== Disciplinary record ===
Includes all competitive matches. Players with 1 card or more included only.

Last updated on 14 March 2020

Position	Nation	Number	Name	Merkantil Bank Liga		Hungarian Cup		Total (Hu Total)	
Position	Nation	Number	Name	Yellow card	Red card	Yellow card	Red card	Yellow card	Red card
GK	(Hungary)	1	Dániel Póser	1	0	0	0	1 (1)	0 (0)
DF	(Hungary)	2	Balázs Opavszky	3	0	0	0	3 (3)	0 (0)
MF	(Hungary)	5	Bálint Oláh	2	0	0	0	2 (2)	0 (0)
DF	(Hungary)	6	Gergő Gohér	1	0	0	0	1 (1)	0 (0)
MF	(Hungary)	9	Sebestyén Ihrig-Farkas	1	0	1	0	2 (1)	0 (0)
FW	(Hungary)	10	Dávid Kovács	5	0	0	0	5 (5)	0 (0)
MF	(Hungary)	11	Miklós Micsinai	1	0	1	0	2 (1)	0 (0)
MF	(Serbia)	13	Vladimir Veselinov	0	0	1	0	1 (0)	0 (0)
MF	(Hungary)	15	Alen Skribek	1	0	0	0	1 (1)	0 (0)
MF	(Hungary)	16	Attila Filkor	4	1	0	0	4 (4)	1 (1)
DF	(Hungary)	17	Gergő Vaszicsku	5	1	0	0	5 (5)	1 (1)
FW	(Hungary)	18	Roland Horváth	1	0	0	0	1 (1)	0 (0)
DF	(Croatia)	19	Danijel Romić	3	0	0	0	3 (3)	0 (0)
MF	(Hungary)	20	Kornél Kulcsár	5	0	0	0	5 (5)	0 (0)
DF	(Hungary)	21	Henrik Kirják	4	0	0	0	4 (4)	0 (0)
DF	(Hungary)	23	Martin Króner	0	0	1	0	1 (0)	0 (0)
MF	(Hungary)	24	István Soltész	8	0	0	0	8 (8)	0 (0)
FW	(Hungary)	25	Máté Szabó	2	1	2	0	4 (2)	1 (1)
GK	(Hungary)	29	Zoltán Kovács	1	0	0	0	1 (1)	0 (0)
			TOTALS	48	3	6	0	54 (48)	3 (3)

=== Overall ===
Games played	30 (27 Merkantil Bank Liga and 3 Hungarian Cup)
Games won	17 (16 Merkantil Bank Liga and 1 Hungarian Cup)
Games drawn	7 (6 Merkantil Bank Liga and 1 Hungarian Cup)
Games lost	6 (5 Merkantil Bank Liga and 1 Hungarian Cup)
Goals scored	49
Goals conceded	26
Goal difference	+23
Yellow cards	54
Red cards	3
Worst discipline	(Hungary) István Soltész (8 (yellow card) , 0 (red card) )
Best result	5–0 (A) v Törökszentmiklós - Nemzeti Bajnokság II - 22-09-2019
Worst result	1–3 (H) v Ajka - Nemzeti Bajnokság II - 15-09-2019
Worst result	0–2 (A) v Ajka - Nemzeti Bajnokság II - 08-03-2020
Most appearances	(Hungary) Dávid Kovács (29 appearances)
Most appearances	(Croatia) Danijel Romić (29 appearances)
Top scorer	(Hungary) Dávid Kovács (18 goals)
Points	58/90 (64.44%)

Last updated: 14 March 2020
