= Alen Skribek =

Hungarian footballer (born 2001)

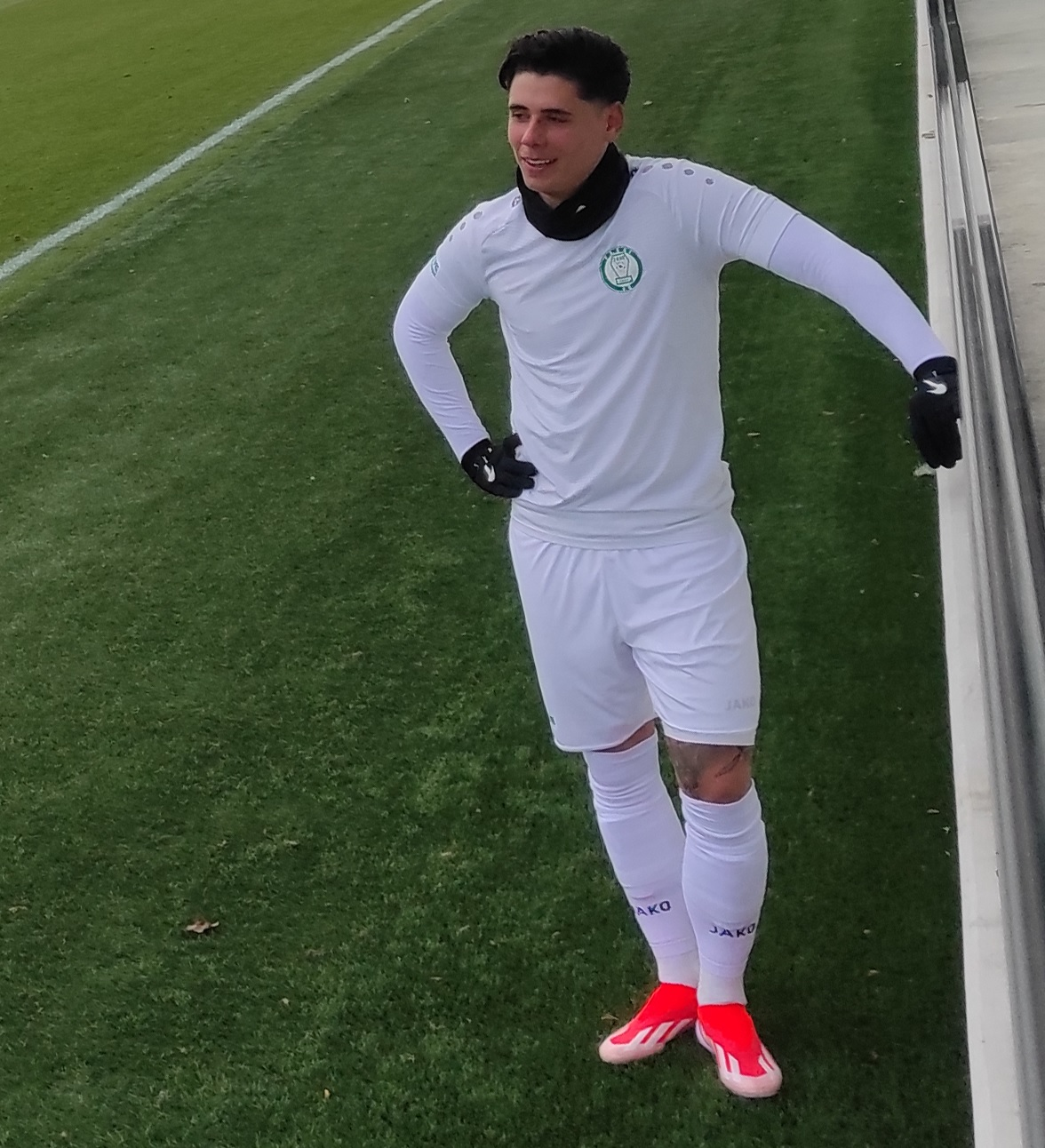
- Skribek with Paks II in 2024

Personal information
- Full name: Alen Martin Skribek
- Date of birth: 11 April 2001 (age 25)
- Place of birth: Budapest, Hungary
- Height: 1.74 m (5 ft 9 in)
- Position: Right winger

Team information
- Current team: Zalaegerszeg (on loan from Paks)
- Number: 7

Youth career
- 2014–2017: Ferencváros
- 2017–2018: Puskás Akadémia

Senior career*
Years	Team	Apps	(Gls)
2018–2022	Puskás Akadémia II	25	(13)
2019–2023	Puskás Akadémia	24	(1)
2019	→ Csákvár (loan)	21	(5)
2020–2021	→ Budafok (loan)	33	(8)
2021	→ Zalaegerszeg (loan)	17	(2)
2023–	Paks	25	(2)
2023–2024	Paks II	8	(2)
2025	→ Diósgyőr (loan)	8	(1)
2025	→ Diósgyőr II (loan)	1	(0)
2025–	→ Zalaegerszeg (loan)	29	(9)

International career^{‡}
2016	Hungary U-16	2	(0)
2018	Hungary U-17	1	(0)
2018	Hungary U-18	9	(3)
2018–2019	Hungary U-19	6	(1)
2021	Hungary U-21	3	(0)
- * Club domestic league appearances and goals as of 30 May 2026 ‡ National team caps and goals as of 19 October 2019

Alen Martin Skribek (born 11 April 2001) is a Hungarian professional footballer who plays as a right winger for Nemzeti Bajnokság I club Zalaegerszeg, on loan from Paks. .

== Club career ==
=== Paks ===
On 26 January 2023, Skribek signed a three-and-a-half-year contract with Paks. On 15 May 2024, he won the 2024 Magyar Kupa Final with Paks by beating Ferencváros 2–0 at the Puskás Aréna.

== International career ==
He was a squad member for the 2021 UEFA European Under-21 Championship.

== Career statistics ==
As of match played 27 September 2025

Appearances and goals by club, season and competition
Club	Season	League			Magyar Kupa		Europe		Total	
Club	Season	Division	Apps	Goals	Apps	Goals	Apps	Goals	Apps	Goals
Puskás Akadémia II	2018–19	Nemzeti Bajnokság III	14	8	—		—		14	8
Puskás Akadémia II	2019–20	Nemzeti Bajnokság III	9	5	—		—		9	5
Puskás Akadémia II	2022–23	Nemzeti Bajnokság III	2	0	—		—		2	0
Puskás Akadémia II	Total		25	13	—		—		25	13
Csákvár (loan)	2018–19	Nemzeti Bajnokság II	14	5	—		—		14	5
Csákvár (loan)	2019–20	Nemzeti Bajnokság II	7	0	—		—		7	0
Csákvár (loan)	Total		21	5	—		—		21	5
Puskás Akadémia	2019–20	Nemzeti Bajnokság I	0	0	1	0	—		1	0
Puskás Akadémia	2021–22	Nemzeti Bajnokság I	16	1	—		—		16	1
Puskás Akadémia	2022–23	Nemzeti Bajnokság I	8	0	2	0	1 (Note: Appearance in UEFA Europa Conference League)	0	11	0
Puskás Akadémia	Total		24	1	2	0	1	0	27	1
Budafok (loan)	2019–20	Nemzeti Bajnokság II	7	2	—		—		7	2
Budafok (loan)	2020–21	Nemzeti Bajnokság I	26	6	4	3	—		30	9
Budafok (loan)	Total		33	8	4	3	—		37	11
Zalaegerszeg (loan)	2021–22	Nemzeti Bajnokság I	17	2	2	0	—		19	2
Paks	2022–23	Nemzeti Bajnokság I	12	1	2	2	—		14	3
Paks	2023–24	Nemzeti Bajnokság I	12	1	3	2	—		15	3
Paks	2024–25	Nemzeti Bajnokság I	1	0	—		0	0	1	0
Paks	Total		25	2	5	4	—		30	6
Paks II	2022–23	Nemzeti Bajnokság III	2	0	—		—		2	0
Paks II	2023–24	Nemzeti Bajnokság III	3	1	—		—		3	1
Paks II	2024–25	Nemzeti Bajnokság III	3	1	—		—		3	1
Paks II	Total		8	2	—		—		8	2
Diósgyőr (loan)	2024–25	Nemzeti Bajnokság I	8	1	—		—		8	1
Diósgyőr II (loan)	2024–25	Nemzeti Bajnokság III	1	0	—		—		1	0
Zalaegerszeg (loan)	2025–26	Nemzeti Bajnokság I	6	3	1	1	—		7	4
Career total			168	37	15	8	1	0	184	45

== Honours ==
Paks

- Magyar Kupa: 2023–24
