= Máté Szabó =

Hungarian footballer (born 1999)

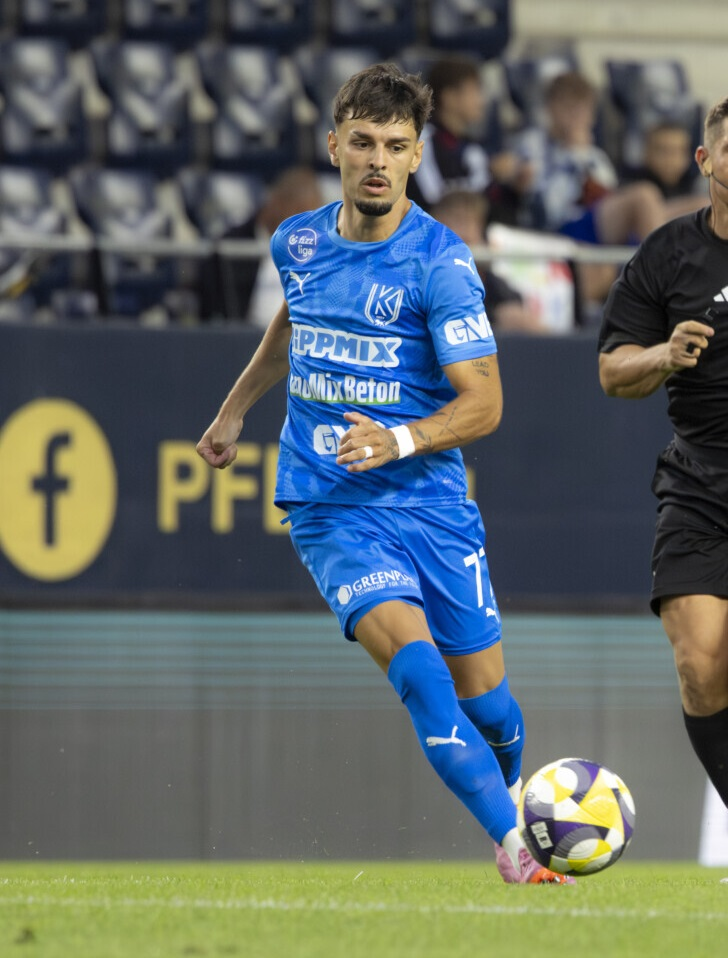
- Szabó playing for Kazincbarcika in 2025

Personal information
- Date of birth: 26 January 1999 (age 27)
- Place of birth: Budapest, Hungary
- Height: 1.78 m (5 ft 10 in)
- Position: Left winger

Team information
- Current team: Ajka (on loan from Kazincbarcika)
- Number: 9

Youth career
- 2006–2010: Budatétény
- 2010–2017: Puskás Akadémia

Senior career*
Years	Team	Apps	(Gls)
2016–2019	Puskás Akadémia II	45	(10)
2019	→ Csákvár (loan)	12	(0)
2019–2022	Budafok	74	(9)
2022–2023	Szentlőrinc	31	(7)
2023–2024	Pécs	35	(2)
2024–	Kazincbarcika	29	(2)
2025–	→ Ajka (loan)	6	(0)

International career^{‡}
2017	Hungary U-18	4	(1)
2019–2020	Hungary U-21	5	(0)
- * Club domestic league appearances and goals as of 20 January 2026 ‡ National team caps and goals as of 13 November 2020

Máté Szabó (born 26 January 1999) is a Hungarian professional footballer who plays for Ajka, on loan from Kazincbarcika.

== Club career ==
On 17 January 2023, Szabó signed with Pécs.

== Career statistics ==
As of 15 May 2021.

Appearances and goals by club, season and competition
Club	Season	League			Cup		Continental		Other		Total	
Club	Season	Division	Apps	Goals	Apps	Goals	Apps	Goals	Apps	Goals	Apps	Goals
Puskás Akadémia II	2017–18	Nemzeti Bajnokság III	10	2	0	0	—		—		10	2
Puskás Akadémia II	2018–19	Nemzeti Bajnokság III	22	4	0	0	—		—		22	4
Puskás Akadémia II	2019–20	Nemzeti Bajnokság III	13	4	0	0	—		—		13	4
Puskás Akadémia II	Total		45	10	0	0	0	0	0	0	45	10
Csákvár	2018–19	Nemzeti Bajnokság II	12	0	0	0	—		—		12	0
Csákvár	Total		12	0	0	0	0	0	0	0	12	0
Budafok	2019–20	Nemzeti Bajnokság II	26	8	3	1	—		—		29	9
Budafok	2020–21	Nemzeti Bajnokság I	30	0	5	4	—		—		35	4
Budafok	Total		56	8	8	5	0	0	0	0	64	13
Career total			113	18	8	5	0	0	0	0	121	23
