= Kornél Kulcsár =

Hungarian footballer

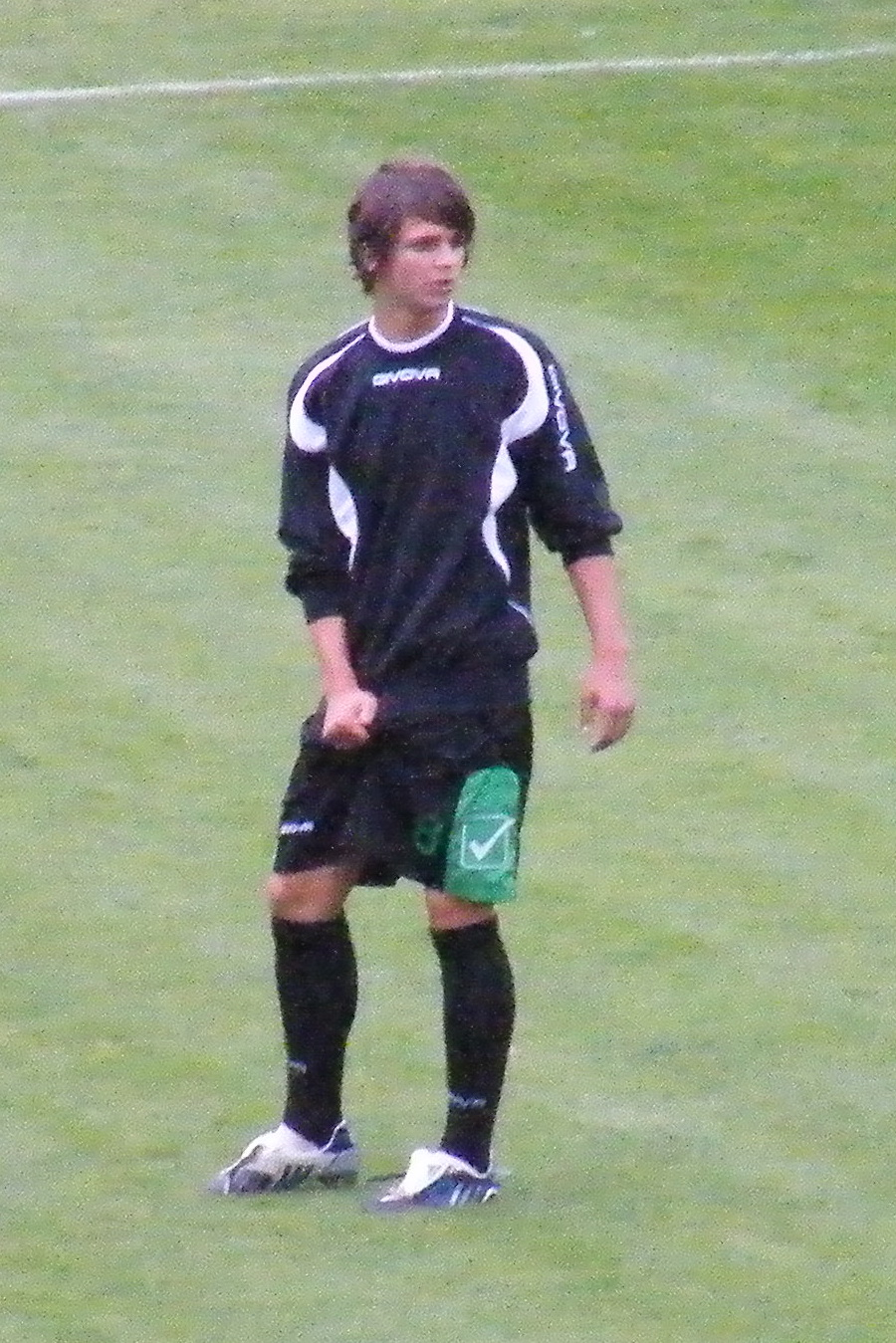

Personal information
- Date of birth: 11 November 1991 (age 35)
- Place of birth: Nagyatád, Hungary
- Height: 1.78 m (5 ft 10 in)
- Position: Midfielder

Team information
- Current team: Târgu Mureș

Youth career
- 2002–2005: Nagyatád
- 2005–2009: Kaposvár

Senior career*
Years	Team	Apps	(Gls)
2009–2012	Kaposvár	45	(1)
2012–2015	Haladás	14	(1)
2013	→ Zalaegerszeg (loan)	11	(3)
2014	→ Pápa (loan)	11	(0)
2014–2015	→ Mezőkövesd (loan)	21	(1)
2015–2016	Kisvárda	17	(1)
2016–2017	Győr	24	(10)
2017–2018	Sopron	7	(0)
2018	Mosonmagyaróvár	15	(3)
2018–2019	Zalaegerszeg	5	(0)
2019–2021	Budafok	68	(9)
2021–2022	Győr	11	(3)
2022	Budafok	7	(0)
2022–2023	Kozármisleny	13	(0)
2023–	Târgu Mureș	0	(0)

International career^{‡}
2009–2010	Hungary U-19	4	(1)
2010–2013	Hungary U-21	2	(0)
- * Club domestic league appearances and goals as of 5 February 2023 ‡ National team caps and goals as of 17 November 2010

Kornél Kulcsár (born 11 November 1991) is a Hungarian football player who plays for Romanian club Târgu Mureș.

== Career statistics ==
Appearances and goals by club, season and competition
Club	Season	League		Cup		League Cup		Europe		Total	
Club	Season	Apps	Goals	Apps	Goals	Apps	Goals	Apps	Goals	Apps	Goals
Kapsovár
Kapsovár	2009–10	12	0	2	0	4	1	–	–	18	1
Kapsovár	2010–11	20	1	5	1	3	0	–	–	28	2
Kapsovár	2011–12	13	0	2	0	4	0	–	–	19	0
Kapsovár	Total	45	1	9	1	11	1	0	0	65	3
Szombathely
Szombathely	2011–12	8	1	0	0	0	0	–	–	8	1
Szombathely	2012–13	6	0	1	0	1	0	–	–	8	0
Szombathely	Total	14	1	1	0	1	0	0	0	16	1
Zalaegerszeg
Zalaegerszeg	2013–14	11	3	1	0	1	0	–	–	13	3
Zalaegerszeg	2018–19	5	0	1	0	–	–	–	–	6	0
Zalaegerszeg	Total	11	3	1	0	1	0	0	0	13	3
Pápa
Pápa	2013–14	11	0	1	0	4	2	–	–	16	2
Pápa	Total	11	0	1	0	4	2	0	0	16	2
Mezőkövesd
Mezőkövesd	2014–15	21	1	2	1	3	2	–	–	26	4
Mezőkövesd	Total	21	1	2	1	3	2	0	0	26	4
Kisvárda
Kisvárda	2015–16	17	1	3	2	–	–	–	–	20	3
Kisvárda	Total	17	1	3	2	0	0	0	0	20	3
Győr
Győr	2016–17	24	10	1	1	–	–	–	–	25	11
Győr	Total	24	10	1	1	0	0	0	0	25	11
Sopron
Sopron	2017–18	7	0	1	0	–	–	–	–	8	0
Sopron	Total	7	0	1	0	0	0	0	0	8	0
Mosonmagyaróvár
Mosonmagyaróvár	2017–18	15	3	0	0	–	–	–	–	15	3
Mosonmagyaróvár	Total	15	3	0	0	0	0	0	0	15	3
Budafok
Budafok	2018–19	17	4	0	0	–	–	–	–	17	4
Budafok	2019–20	21	3	1	0	–	–	–	–	22	3
Budafok	2020–21	30	2	5	2	–	–	–	–	35	4
Budafok	Total	68	9	6	2	0	0	0	0	74	11
Career total		238	29	27	7	20	5	0	0	285	41

Updated to games played as of 15 May 2021.
