= Marko Iharoš =

Croatian footballer (born 1996)

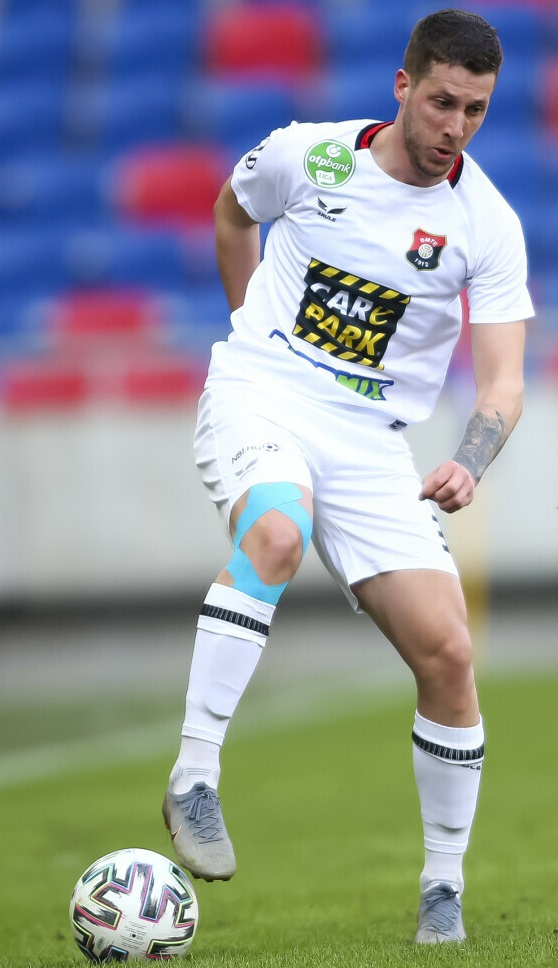
- Iharoš playing for Budafok in 2021

Personal information
- Date of birth: 23 June 1996 (age 30)
- Place of birth: Bjelovar, Croatia
- Height: 1.78 m (5 ft 10 in)
- Position: Defender

Team information
- Current team: Barilović
- Number: 7

Youth career
- 2011–2016: Dinamo Zagreb

Senior career*
Years	Team	Apps	(Gls)
2015	Dinamo Zagreb II	2	(0)
2016–2017	Rudar Velenje	20	(1)
2018	Sūduva	1	(0)
2018–2020	Slaven Belupo	11	(0)
2020–2021	Budafok	5	(0)
2021	Slavia Sofia	0	(0)
2022	Kapfenberger	8	(0)
2022	Kapfenberger Amat.	1	(0)
2023	Radnički NB	6	(0)
2024	Tiszafüred	8	(1)
2024–2025	Bistra	11	(0)
2025–	Barilović	21	(9)

International career
2010–2011	Croatia U15	6	(0)
2012	Croatia U16	10	(0)
2012–2013	Croatia U17	8	(0)
- * Club domestic league appearances and goals as of 30 November 2025

Marko Iharoš (born 23 June 1996) is a Croatian professional footballer who plays as a defender for First County Football League club Barilović.

== Career ==
=== Dinamo Zagreb ===
Iharoš was developed in the Dinamo Zagreb Academy and also played in the UEFA Youth League.

=== Rudar Velenje ===
On 2 November 2016, Iharoš signed a two-year contract with Slovenian PrvaLiga club Rudar Velenje, committing himself to the club until the end of the 2017–18 season. On 7 May 2017, he scored in a 4–2 home victory against Olimpija Ljubljana, a goal that was later named the goal of the year.

On 24 July, Iharoš, alongside Davor Bokalič, mutually terminated his contract with Rudar Velenje.

=== Budafok ===
On 23 June 2020, Iharoš signed with newly promoted Nemzeti Bajnokság I club Budafok.

He suffered a serious knee injury during a pre-season friendly against Radomlje in Slovenia three weeks later after his signing, tearing his anterior cruciate ligament and damaging the cartilage in his right knee. He later underwent surgery in Croatia, which sidelined him for most of the season, with his return expected no earlier than mid-spring.

Following his rehabilitation, Iharos made his competitive debut for the club on 27 February 2021 in the NB I against Kisvárda. He appeared as a late substitute for Sebestyén Ihrig-Farkas in stoppage time, as Budafok secured a 2–0 home victory.

== Personal life ==
Through his paternal grandfather, he has Hungarian ancestry.

== Career statistics ==
=== Club ===
As of match played 30 November 2025

Appearances and goals by club, season and competition
Club	Season	League			National cup (Note: Includes Magyar Kupa, Bulgarian Cup)		Other		Total	
Club	Season	Division	Apps	Goals	Apps	Goals	Apps	Goals	Apps	Goals
Dinamo Zagreb II	2015–16	Croatian Second Football League	2	0	—		—		2	0
Rudar Velenje	2016–17	Slovenian PrvaLiga	20	1	—		—		20	1
Sūduva	2018	A Lyga	1	0	—		1 (Note: Appearance in Lithuanian Supercup)	0	2	0
Slaven Belupo	2018–19	Croatian First Football League	8	0	0	0	—		8	0
Slaven Belupo	2019–20	Croatian First Football League	3	0	—		—		3	0
Slaven Belupo	Total		11	0	0	0	—		11	0
Budafok	2020–21	Nemzeti Bajnokság I	5	0	1	0	—		6	0
Slavia Sofia	2021–22	First Professional Football League	0	0	1	0	—		1	0
Kapfenberger	2021–22	Austrian Football Second League	8	0	—		—		8	0
Kapfenberger Amat.	2021–22	Oberliga Nord	1	0	—		—		1	0
Radnički NB	2022–23	Serbian First League	6	0	—		—		6	0
Tiszafüred	2023–24	Nemzeti Bajnokság III	8	1	—		—		8	1
Bistra	2024–25	Third Football League	11	0	—		—		11	0
Barilović	2024–25	First County Football League	12	5	—		—		12	5
Barilović	2025–26	First County Football League	9	4	—		1 (Note: Appearance in Karlovac Cup)	4	10	8
Barilović	Total		21	9	—		1	4	22	13
Career total			94	11	2	0	2	4	98	15

=== International ===
Appearances and goals by national team and year
Team	Year	Total	
Team	Year	Apps	Goals
Croatia U15	2010	2	0
Croatia U15	2011	4	0
Croatia U15	Total	6	0
Croatia U16	2012	10	0
Croatia U17	2012	6	0
Croatia U17	2013	2	0
Croatia U17	Total	8	0
Career total		24	0

== Honours ==
Sūduva

- A Lyga: 2018
- Lithuanian Supercup: 2018
