= Kornél Khiesz =

Hungarian footballer

Personal information
- Date of birth: 19 October 1992 (age 34)
- Place of birth: Veszprém, Hungary
- Height: 1.83 m (6 ft 0 in)
- Position: Centre back

Team information
- Current team: Balatonfüred

Youth career
- 2003–2012: Veszprém

Senior career*
Years	Team	Apps	(Gls)
2012–2015	Újbuda	78	(6)
2015–2022	Budafok	109	(5)
2022–	Balatonfüred	0	(0)
- * Club domestic league appearances and goals as of 7 November 2021

Kornél Khiesz (born 19 October 1992) is a Hungarian professional footballer who plays for Balatonfüred.

== Career statistics ==
As of 15 May 2021.

Appearances and goals by club, season and competition
Club	Season	League			Cup		Continental		Other		Total	
Club	Season	Division	Apps	Goals	Apps	Goals	Apps	Goals	Apps	Goals	Apps	Goals
Újbuda	2011–12	Nemzeti Bajnokság III	8	0	2	0	—		—		10	0
Újbuda	2012–13	Nemzeti Bajnokság III	22	1	1	0	—		2	0	25	1
Újbuda	2013–14	Nemzeti Bajnokság III	27	3	0	0	—		—		27	3
Újbuda	2014–15	Nemzeti Bajnokság III	21	2	1	0	—		—		22	2
Újbuda	Total		78	6	4	0	0	0	2	0	84	6
Budafok	2015–16	Nemzeti Bajnokság III	30	2	2	0	—		—		32	2
Budafok	2016–17	Nemzeti Bajnokság III	27	1	8	0	—		—		35	1
Budafok	2017–18	Nemzeti Bajnokság II	24	0	3	0	—		—		27	0
Budafok	2018–19	Nemzeti Bajnokság II	25	2	2	0	—		—		27	2
Budafok	2019–20	Nemzeti Bajnokság II	2	0	0	0	—		—		2	0
Budafok	2020–21	Nemzeti Bajnokság I	1	0	1	0	—		—		2	0
Budafok	Total		109	5	16	0	0	0	0	0	125	5
Career total			187	11	20	0	0	0	2	0	209	11
