= Miklós Micsinai =

Hungarian footballer (born 1998)

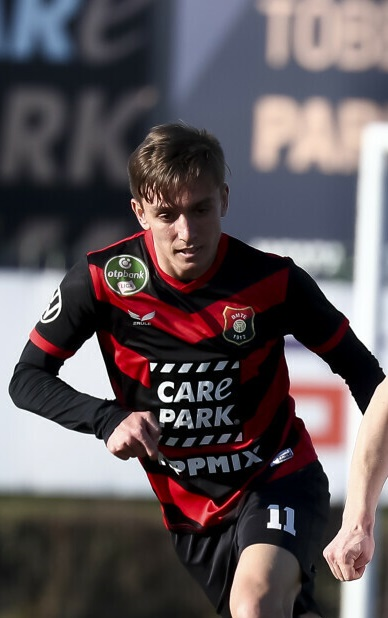
- Micsinai playing for Budafok in 2021

Personal information
- Date of birth: 11 January 1998 (age 28)
- Place of birth: Kecskemét, Hungary
- Height: 1.79 m (5 ft 10 in)
- Position: Central midfielder

Team information
- Current team: Szeged-Csanád

Youth career
- 2005–2009: Kecskemét
- 2009–2016: Vasas

Senior career*
Years	Team	Apps	(Gls)
2016–2017	Siófok	17	(0)
2017–2018	Kazincbarcika	11	(0)
2018–2022	Budafok	67	(3)
2022–	Szeged-Csanád	0	(0)
- * Club domestic league appearances and goals as of 22 May 2022

Miklós Micsinai (born 11 January 1998) is a Hungarian professional footballer who plays for Szeged-Csanád.

== Club career ==
On 24 June 2022, Micsinai joined Szeged-Csanád.

== Career statistics ==
As of 15 May 2021.

Appearances and goals by club, season and competition
Club	Season	League			Cup		Continental		Other		Total	
Club	Season	Division	Apps	Goals	Apps	Goals	Apps	Goals	Apps	Goals	Apps	Goals
Siófok	2016–17	Nemzeti Bajnokság II	17	0	1	0	—		—		18	0
Siófok	Total		17	0	1	0	0	0	0	0	18	0
Kazincbarcika	2017–18	Nemzeti Bajnokság II	11	0	1	0	—		—		12	0
Kazincbarcika	Total		11	0	1	0	0	0	0	0	12	0
Budafok	2017–18	Nemzeti Bajnokság II	3	0	0	0	—		—		3	0
Budafok	2018–19	Nemzeti Bajnokság II	20	1	0	0	—		—		20	1
Budafok	2019–20	Nemzeti Bajnokság II	12	1	3	0	—		—		15	1
Budafok	2020–21	Nemzeti Bajnokság I	22	0	5	0	—		—		27	0
Budafok	Total		57	2	8	0	0	0	0	0	65	2
Career total			85	2	10	0	0	0	0	0	95	2
