= Henrik Kirják =

Hungarian footballer

Personal information
- Date of birth: 12 July 1999 (age 27)
- Place of birth: Szolnok, Hungary
- Height: 1.77 m (5 ft 10 in)
- Position: Left back

Team information
- Current team: III. Kerületi

Youth career
- 2009–2010: Szolnok
- 2010–2011: Vasas
- 2011–2014: Szolnok
- 2014–2016: Győr
- 2016–2017: Haladás

Senior career*
Years	Team	Apps	(Gls)
2017–2021	Budafok	48	(2)
2021–2022	Gyirmót	11	(1)
2022–	III. Kerületi	14	(0)
- * Club domestic league appearances and goals as of 12 March 2023

Henrik Kirják (born 12 July 1999) is a Hungarian professional footballer who plays for III. Kerületi.

== Career statistics ==
As of 22 November 2020.

Appearances and goals by club, season and competition
Club	Season	League			Cup		Continental		Other		Total	
Club	Season	Division	Apps	Goals	Apps	Goals	Apps	Goals	Apps	Goals	Apps	Goals
Budafok	2017–18	Nemzeti Bajnokság II	13	1	0	0	—		—		13	1
Budafok	2018–19	Nemzeti Bajnokság II	16	1	1	0	—		—		17	1
Budafok	2019–20	Nemzeti Bajnokság II	18	0	1	0	—		—		19	0
Budafok	2020–21	Nemzeti Bajnokság I	1	0	2	0	—		—		3	0
Budafok	Total		48	2	4	0	0	0	0	0	52	2
Career total			48	2	4	0	0	0	0	0	52	2
