= István Soltész =

Hungarian footballer (born 2000)

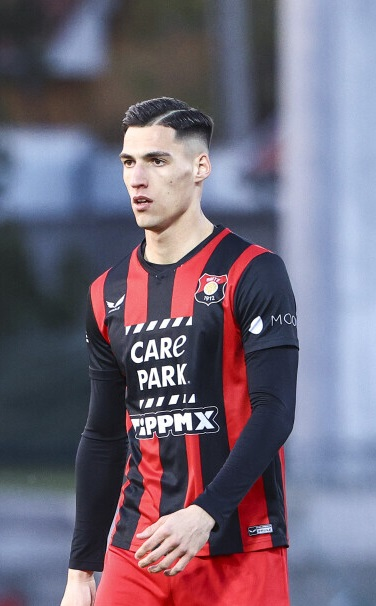
- Soltész playing for Budafok in 2023

Personal information
- Full name: István Zoltán Soltész
- Date of birth: 29 November 2000 (age 25)
- Place of birth: Budapest, Hungary
- Height: 1.77 m (5 ft 10 in)
- Position: Central midfielder

Team information
- Current team: Kisvárda
- Number: 8

Youth career
- 2005–2010: Gyál
- 2010–2018: Budapest Honvéd

Senior career*
Years	Team	Apps	(Gls)
2017–2018	Budapest Honvéd II	2	(0)
2018–2019	Kelen	35	(6)
2019–2023	Budafok	92	(5)
2023–2024	Zalaegerszeg	4	(0)
2024	→ Budafok (loan)	14	(0)
2024–	Kisvárda	26	(1)
- * Club domestic league appearances and goals as of 30 May 2026

István Zoltán Soltész (born 29 November 2000) is a Hungarian professional footballer who plays as a midfielder for Nemzeti Bajnokság I club Kisvárda.

== Career statistics ==
As of 15 May 2021.

Appearances and goals by club, season and competition
Club	Season	League			Cup		Continental		Other		Total	
Club	Season	Division	Apps	Goals	Apps	Goals	Apps	Goals	Apps	Goals	Apps	Goals
Budapest Honvéd II	2017–18	Nemzeti Bajnokság III	2	0	0	0	—		—		2	0
Budapest Honvéd II	Total		2	0	0	0	0	0	0	0	2	0
Kelen	2017–18	Megyei Bajnokság I	11	1	0	0	—		—		11	1
Kelen	2018–19	Megyei Bajnokság I	24	5	1	0	—		6	1	31	6
Kelen	Total		35	6	1	0	0	0	6	1	42	7
Budafok	2019–20	Nemzeti Bajnokság II	20	1	1	0	—		—		21	1
Budafok	2020–21	Nemzeti Bajnokság I	5	0	1	0	—		—		6	0
Budafok	Total		25	1	2	0	0	0	0	0	27	1
Career total			62	7	3	0	0	0	6	1	71	8
