= Bence Mervó =

Hungarian footballer (born 1995)

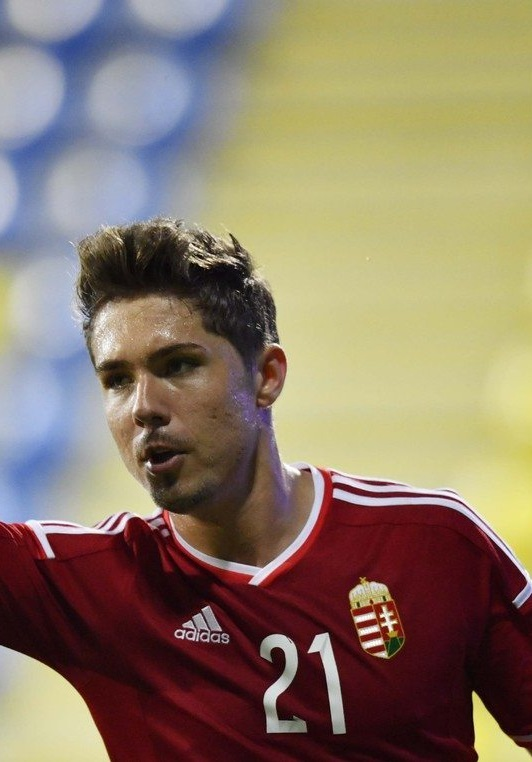
- Mervó playing for Hungary U21 in 2016

Personal information
- Date of birth: 5 March 1995 (age 31)
- Place of birth: Mosonmagyaróvár, Hungary
- Height: 1.85 m (6 ft 1 in)
- Position: Forward

Youth career
- 2006–2014: Győri ETO

Senior career*
Years	Team	Apps	(Gls)
2014–2015	Győri ETO	5	(0)
2015	MTK Budapest	0	(0)
2015–2017	Sion	0	(0)
2016	→ Śląsk Wrocław (loan)	21	(4)
2017–2018	DAC Dunajská Streda	10	(0)
2018–2019	Győri ETO	17	(2)
2019–2022	Budafok	7	(0)
2021	→ Szentlőrinc (loan)	16	(3)
2021–2022	→ Szentlőrinc (loan)	19	(2)
2022–2023	Szentlőrinc	27	(1)

International career
2014	Hungary U19	3	(1)
2015	Hungary U20	4	(5)
2015–2016	Hungary U21	9	(3)
- * Club domestic league appearances and goals as of 5 March 2024

Bence Mervó (born 5 March 1995) is a Hungarian professional footballer who plays as a forward.

== Club career ==
On 31 May 2014, Mervó made his first appearance for Győr on the 30th match day of the 2013–14 Nemzeti Bajnokság I season against Mezőkövesd at ETO Park, Győr, Hungary.

In the 2014–15 Nemzeti Bajnokság I season, he made five more appearances for Győr.

=== Sion ===
In 2015, Mervó was signed by Swiss Super League club Sion. He made no appearances during the 2015–16 Swiss Super League season.

==== Śląsk Wrocław (loan) ====
On 29 February 2016, he was loaned to Polish Ekstraklasa club Śląsk Wrocław.

On 9 April 2016, he scored his first goal in the 70th minute against Cracovia on the 30th match day of the 2015–16 Ekstraklasa season at the Stadion Miejski, Wrocław, Poland. The match ended with a 2–1 victory for Śląsk.

On 20 April 2016, he scored a double, in the 14th and 35th minute, in a 3–1 win over Jagiellonia Białystok on the 2nd match day of the 2015–16 Ekstraklasa play-off.

=== Szentlőrinc ===
After playing for Szentlőrinc on loan in the previous two seasons, on 18 July 2022 Mervó moved to the club on a permanent basis, signing a two-year contract.

== International career ==
He was part of the Hungarian U19 at the 2014 UEFA European Under-19 Championship and the U20 team at the 2015 FIFA U-20 World Cup.

=== Hungary U21 ===
On 1 September 2016, he scored a double against Liechtenstein in the 2017 UEFA European Under-21 Championship qualification match at Ménfői út.

== Career statistics ==
Appearances and goals by club, season and competition
Club	Season	League			Cup		League Cup		Europe		Total	
Club	Season	Division	Apps	Goals	Apps	Goals	Apps	Goals	Apps	Goals	Apps	Goals
Győr
Győr	2013–14	Nemzeti Bajnokság I	1	0	0	0	—		—		1	0
Győr	2014–15	Nemzeti Bajnokság I	5	0	0	0	2	0	—		7	0
Győr	2018–19	Nemzeti Bajnokság II	17	2	1	1	—		—		18	3
Győr	Total		23	2	1	1	2	0	0	0	26	3
Śląsk Wrocław
Śląsk Wrocław	2015–16	Ekstraklasa	10	4	0	0	—		—		10	4
Śląsk Wrocław	2016–17	Ekstraklasa	11	0	1	1	—		—		11	1
Śląsk Wrocław	Total		21	4	1	1	0	0	0	0	21	5
Dunajká Streda
Dunajká Streda	2016–17	Slovak First Football League	3	0	0	0	—		—		3	0
Dunajká Streda	2017–18	Slovak First Football League	7	0	2	1	—		—		9	1
Dunajká Streda	Total		10	0	2	1	0	0	0	0	12	1
Budafok
Budafok	2019–20	Nemzeti Bajnokság II	2	0	0	0	—		—		2	0
Budafok	2020–21	Nemzeti Bajnokság I	3	0	1	0	—		—		4	0
Budafok	Total		5	0	1	0	0	0	0	0	6	0
Career total			59	6	5	3	2	0	0	0	66	9

Updated to games played as of 23 December 2020.
