= Bálint Oláh =

Hungarian footballer (born 1994)

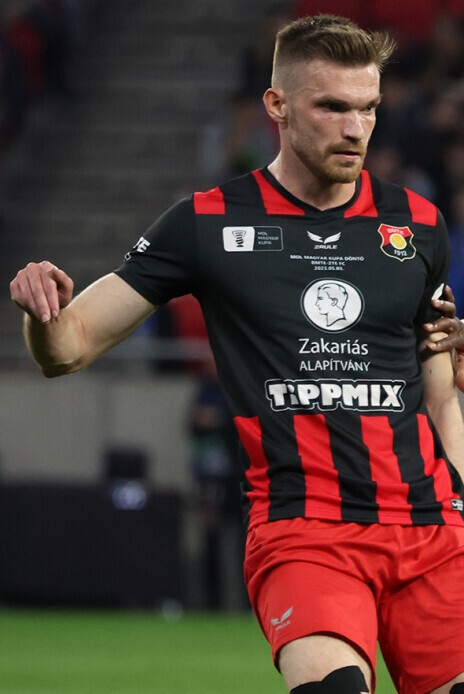
- Oláh playing for Budafok in 2023

Personal information
- Date of birth: 2 December 1994 (age 31)
- Place of birth: Miskolc, Hungary
- Height: 1.88 m (6 ft 2 in)
- Position: Defensive midfielder

Team information
- Current team: Kisvárda
- Number: 50

Youth career
- 2006–2016: Diósgyőr

Senior career*
Years	Team	Apps	(Gls)
2016–2017	Diósgyőr	13	(1)
2016	→ Zalaegerszeg (loan)	13	(0)
2017–2020	Mezőkövesd	4	(0)
2018–2020	→ Budafok (loan)	62	(2)
2020–2021	Budafok	32	(1)
2021–2022	Diósgyőr	38	(1)
2022–2025	Budafok	84	(10)
2025–	Kisvárda	17	(0)
- * Club domestic league appearances and goals as of 30 May 2026

Bálint Oláh (born 2 December 1994) is a Hungarian professional footballer who plays for Nemzeti Bajnokság I club Kisvárda.

== Club career ==
On 28 May 2021, Oláh returned to his first club Diósgyőr.

On 31 August 2022, Oláh returned to Budafok.

On 16 June 2025, Oláh signed to Kisvárda.

== Career statistics ==
Appearances and goals by club, season and competition
Club	Season	League			Cup		Europe		Total	
Club	Season	Division	Apps	Goals	Apps	Goals	Apps	Goals	Apps	Goals
Diósgyőr
Diósgyőr	2016–17	Nemzeti Bajnokság I	9	1	1	1	—		10	2
Diósgyőr	2017–18	Nemzeti Bajnokság I	4	0	3	1	—		7	1
Diósgyőr	Total		13	1	4	2	0	0	17	3
Zalaegerszeg	2016–17	Nemzeti Bajnokság II	13	0	1	0	—		14	0
Mezőkövesd	2017–18	Nemzeti Bajnokság I	4	0	0	0	—		4	0
Budafok
Budafok	2018–19	Nemzeti Bajnokság II	36	1	3	1	—		39	2
Budafok	2019–20	Nemzeti Bajnokság II	26	1	1	0	—		27	1
Budafok	2020–21	Nemzeti Bajnokság I	32	1	5	0	—		37	1
Budafok	Total		94	3	9	1	0	0	103	4
Career total			124	4	14	3	0	0	138	7

Updated to games played as of 15 May 2021.
