= Balázs Bese =

Hungarian footballer (born 1999)

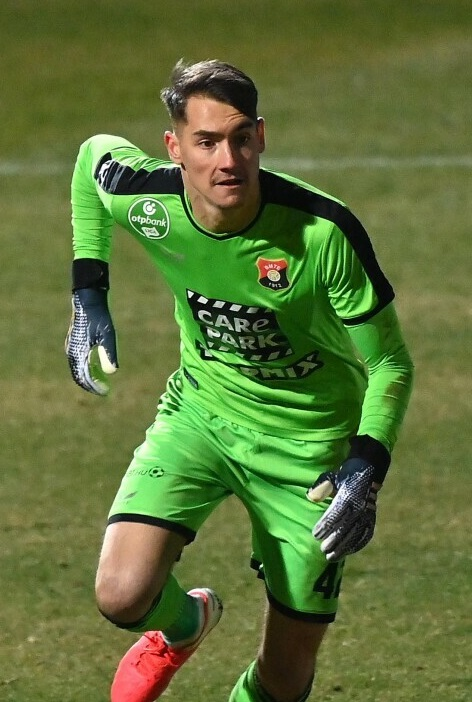
- Bese playing for Budafok in 2021

Personal information
- Date of birth: 22 January 1999 (age 27)
- Place of birth: Budapest, Hungary
- Height: 1.91 m (6 ft 3 in)
- Position: Goalkeeper

Team information
- Current team: Tatabánya (on loan from Nyíregyháza)
- Number: 42

Youth career
- –2009: Csep-Gól FC SE
- 2009–2014: Ferencváros
- 2014–2017: MTK Budapest

Senior career*
Years	Team	Apps	(Gls)
2017–2022	MTK Budapest	12	(0)
2017	→ Budaörs (loan)	16	(0)
2018–2019	→ Vasas (loan)	34	(0)
2020–2022	→ Budafok (loan)	20	(0)
2022–2023	Szentlőrinc	12	(0)
2023–	Nyíregyháza	5	(0)
2025–	→ Tatabánya (loan)	8	(0)

International career^{‡}
2014	Hungary U16	3	(0)
2015–2016	Hungary U17	7	(0)
2016–2017	Hungary U18	6	(0)
2017–2018	Hungary U19	8	(0)
2018–2021	Hungary U21	4	(0)
- * Club domestic league appearances and goals as of 18 May 2025 ‡ National team caps and goals as of 30 March 2021

Balázs Bese (born 22 January 1999) is a Hungarian football player who plays as a goalkeeper for Tatabánya on loan from Nyíregyháza.

== Club career ==
He made his NB I debut for Budafok on 27 February 2021 in a game against Kisvárda.

On 30 July 2022, Bese signed with Szentlőrinc.

== International career ==
Bese represented Hungary at the 2021 UEFA European Under-21 Championship. Hungary lost all three group games and was eliminated, with Bese allowing 11 goals.

== Career statistics ==
As of 15 May 2021.

Appearances and goals by club, season and competition
Club	Season	League			Cup		Continental		Other		Total	
Club	Season	Division	Apps	Goals	Apps	Goals	Apps	Goals	Apps	Goals	Apps	Goals
MTK Budapest II	2016–17	Nemzeti Bajnokság III	6	0	0	0	—		—		6	0
Budaörs	2017–18	Nemzeti Bajnokság II	16	0	1	0	—		—		17	0
Vasas	2018–19	Nemzeti Bajnokság II	34	0	0	0	—		—		34	0
Budafok	2020–21	Nemzeti Bajnokság I	8	0	4	0	—		—		12	0
MTK Budapest	2017–18	Nemzeti Bajnokság II	7	0	2	0	—		—		9	0
MTK Budapest	2019–20	Nemzeti Bajnokság II	5	0	0	0	—		—		5	0
MTK Budapest	Total		12	0	2	0	0	0	0	0	14	0
Career total			76	0	7	0	0	0	0	0	83	0
