= Zsolt Venczel =

Hungarian footballer

Personal information
- Full name: Zsolt Bence Venczel
- Date of birth: 25 November 2002 (age 23)
- Place of birth: Budapest, Hungary
- Height: 1.88 m (6 ft 2 in)
- Position: Defender

Team information
- Current team: Kápolnásnyék

Youth career
- 2012–2020: Budafok

Senior career*
Years	Team	Apps	(Gls)
2020–2022	Budafok	1	(0)
2022–	Kápolnásnyék	0	(0)
- * Club domestic league appearances and goals as of 14 August 2022

Zsolt Venczel (born 25 November 2002) is a Hungarian professional footballer who plays for Kápolnásnyék.

== Career statistics ==
As of 22 November 2020.

Appearances and goals by club, season and competition
Club	Season	League			Cup		Continental		Other		Total	
Club	Season	Division	Apps	Goals	Apps	Goals	Apps	Goals	Apps	Goals	Apps	Goals
Budafok	2020–21	Nemzeti Bajnokság I	1	0	0	0	—		—		1	0
Budafok	Total		1	0	0	0	0	0	0	0	1	0
Career total			1	0	0	0	0	0	0	0	1	0
