= Dániel Póser =

Hungarian footballer (born 1990)

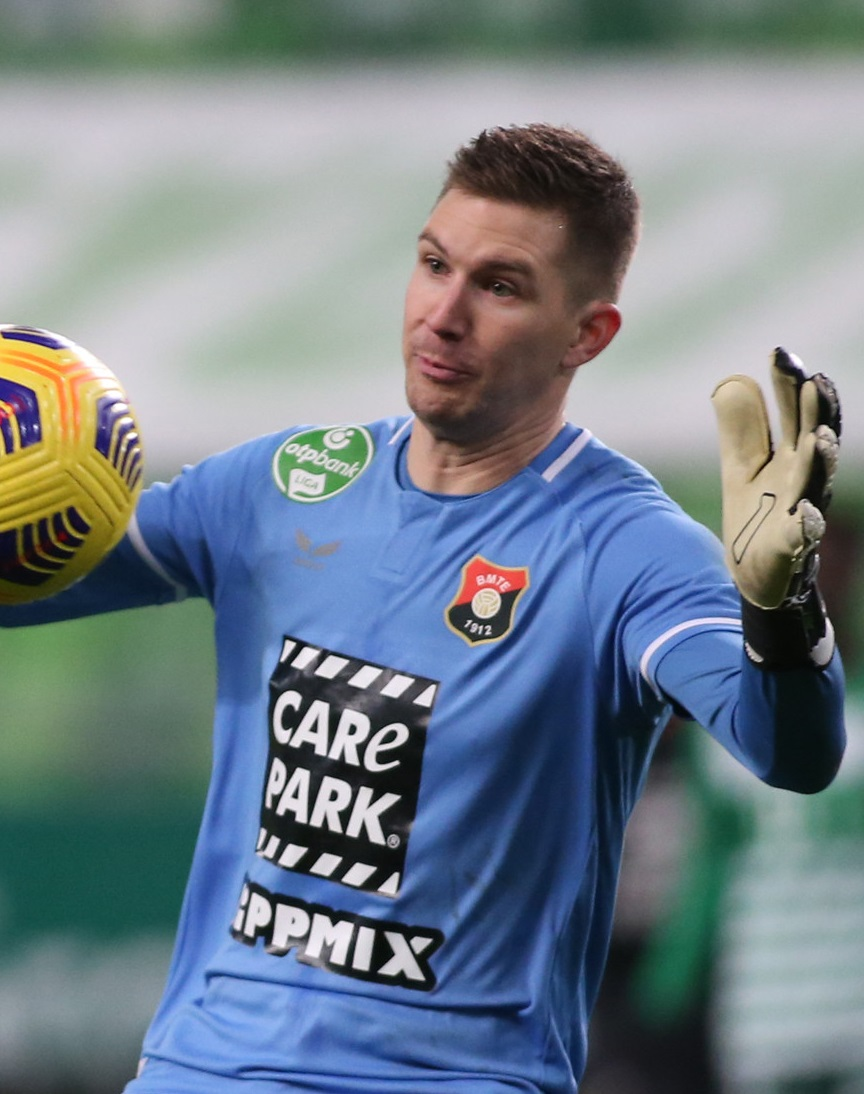
- Póser playing for Budafok in 2020

Personal information
- Date of birth: 12 January 1990 (age 36)
- Place of birth: Debrecen, Hungary
- Height: 1.89 m (6 ft 2 in)
- Position: Goalkeeper

Team information
- Current team: Békéscsaba
- Number: 90

Youth career
- 2002–2007: Debrecen

Senior career*
Years	Team	Apps	(Gls)
2007–2013	Debrecen	0	(0)
2007–2009	→ Debrecen II	5	(0)
2009–2013	→ Létavértes (loan)	53	(0)
2013	Kazincbarcika	7	(0)
2013–2015	Békéscsaba	43	(0)
2015–2018	Vasas	0	(0)
2018–2021	Budafok	47	(0)
2021–2023	Diósgyőr	28	(0)
2023–	Békéscsaba	69	(0)
- * Club domestic league appearances and goals as of 31 May 2026

Dániel Póser (born 12 January 1990) is a Hungarian football goalkeeper who plays for Nemzeti Bajnokság II club Békéscsaba.

== Career ==
On 6 January 2023, Póser returned to Békéscsaba.

== Career statistics ==
As of 15 May 2021.

Appearances and goals by club, season and competition
Club	Season	League			Cup		Continental		Other		Total	
Club	Season	Division	Apps	Goals	Apps	Goals	Apps	Goals	Apps	Goals	Apps	Goals
Debrecen II	2007–08	Nemzeti Bajnokság III	2	0	3	0	—		—		5	0
Debrecen II	2008–09	Nemzeti Bajnokság II	3	0	2	0	—		—		5	0
Debrecen II	Total		5	0	5	0	0	0	0	0	10	0
Debrecen	2008–09	Nemzeti Bajnokság I	0	0	0	0	0	0	1	0	1	0
Debrecen	Total		0	0	0	0	0	0	1	0	1	0
Létavértes	2009–10	Nemzeti Bajnokság III	10	0	1	0	—		—		11	0
Létavértes	2010–11	Nemzeti Bajnokság III	15	0	0	0	—		—		15	0
Létavértes	2011–12	Nemzeti Bajnokság III	15	0	1	0	—		—		16	0
Létavértes	2012–13	Nemzeti Bajnokság III	13	0	5	0	—		—		18	0
Létavértes	Total		53	0	7	0	0	0	0	0	60	0
Kazincbarcika	2012–13	Nemzeti Bajnokság II	7	0	0	0	—		—		7	0
Kazincbarcika	Total		7	0	0	0	0	0	0	0	7	0
Békéscsaba	2013–14	Nemzeti Bajnokság II	26	0	2	0	—		1	0	29	0
Békéscsaba	2014–15	Nemzeti Bajnokság II	17	0	2	0	—		2	0	21	0
Békéscsaba	Total		43	0	4	0	0	0	3	0	50	0
Vasas	2015–16	Nemzeti Bajnokság I	0	0	0	0	—		—		0	0
Vasas	2016–17	Nemzeti Bajnokság I	0	0	5	0	—		—		5	0
Vasas	2017–18	Nemzeti Bajnokság I	0	0	1	0	0	0	—		1	0
Vasas	Total		0	0	6	0	0	0	0	0	6	0
Budafok	2018–19	Nemzeti Bajnokság II	9	0	0	0	—		—		9	0
Budafok	2019–20	Nemzeti Bajnokság II	15	0	2	0	—		—		17	0
Budafok	2020–21	Nemzeti Bajnokság I	23	0	1	0	—		—		24	0
Budafok	Total		47	0	3	0	0	0	0	0	50	0
Career total			155	0	25	0	0	0	4	0	184	0
