= Dávid Kovács (footballer, born 1991) =

Hungarian footballer

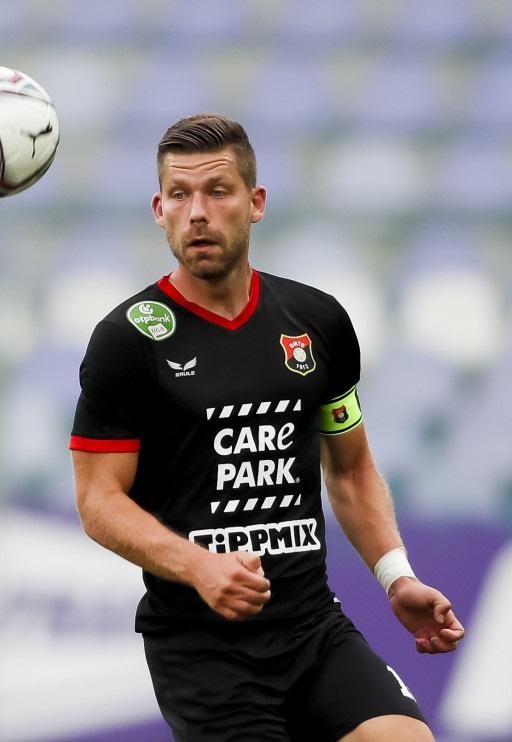
- Kovács playing for Budafok in 2020

Personal information
- Full name: Dávid Kovács
- Date of birth: 18 June 1991 (age 35)
- Place of birth: Budapest, Hungary
- Height: 1.80 m (5 ft 11 in)
- Position: Centre-forward

Team information
- Current team: Budafok
- Number: 10

Youth career
- 2002–2007: Újpest

Senior career*
Years	Team	Apps	(Gls)
2007–2015	Újbuda	183	(77)
2015–	Budafok	331	(92)
- * Club domestic league appearances and goals as of 31 May 2026

Dávid Kovács (born 18 June 1991) is a Hungarian professional footballer who plays as a forward for Nemzeti Bajnokság II club Budafok.

== Career statistics ==
As of 15 May 2021.

Appearances and goals by club, season and competition
Club	Season	League			Cup		Continental		Other		Total	
Club	Season	Division	Apps	Goals	Apps	Goals	Apps	Goals	Apps	Goals	Apps	Goals
Újbuda	2007–08	Megyei Bajnokság I	2	0	0	0	—		—		2	0
Újbuda	2008–09	Nemzeti Bajnokság III	29	6	0	0	—		—		29	6
Újbuda	2009–10	Nemzeti Bajnokság III	19	6	3	2	—		—		22	8
Újbuda	2010–11	Nemzeti Bajnokság III	25	12	5	5	—		—		30	17
Újbuda	2011–12	Nemzeti Bajnokság III	27	15	5	4	—		—		32	19
Újbuda	2012–13	Nemzeti Bajnokság III	25	13	1	0	—		2	1	28	14
Újbuda	2013–14	Nemzeti Bajnokság III	28	14	0	0	—		—		28	14
Újbuda	2014–15	Nemzeti Bajnokság III	28	11	1	1	—		—		29	12
Újbuda	Total		183	77	15	12	0	0	2	1	200	90
Budafok	2015–16	Nemzeti Bajnokság III	30	9	2	2	—		—		32	11
Budafok	2016–17	Nemzeti Bajnokság III	32	10	9	5	—		—		41	15
Budafok	2017–18	Nemzeti Bajnokság II	27	7	1	0	—		—		28	7
Budafok	2018–19	Nemzeti Bajnokság II	36	16	2	2	—		—		38	18
Budafok	2019–20	Nemzeti Bajnokság II	26	15	3	3	—		—		29	18
Budafok	2020–21	Nemzeti Bajnokság I	33	11	5	1	—		—		38	12
Budafok	Total		184	68	22	13	0	0	0	0	206	81
Career total			367	145	37	25	0	0	2	1	406	171
