= Regő Szánthó =

Hungarian footballer

Personal information
- Date of birth: 22 November 2000 (age 25)
- Place of birth: Győr, Hungary
- Height: 1.83 m (6 ft 0 in)
- Position: Left winger

Team information
- Current team: Banská Bystrica
- Number: 10

Youth career
- 2008–2017: Győr

Senior career*
Years	Team	Apps	(Gls)
2017–2020	Győr	59	(10)
2020–2024	Ferencváros	7	(0)
2020	→ Soroksár (loan)	6	(2)
2020–2021	→ ZTE (loan)	27	(10)
2022–2023	→ Dunajská Streda (loan)	29	(5)
2024–2025	Vasas	21	(1)
2025–2026	Žilina	19	(1)
2025–2026	Žilina B	4	(2)
2026–	Banská Bystrica	7	(3)

International career
2018	Hungary U18	6	(0)
2019	Hungary U19	1	(0)
2019–2021	Hungary U21	8	(1)
- * Club domestic league appearances and goals as of 12 September 2026

Regő Szánthó (born 22 November 2000) is a Hungarian professional footballer who plays as a midfielder for Banská Bystrica. He previously played for Vasas.

== Club career ==
=== Ferencváros ===
On 16 June 2020, he became champion with Ferencváros by beating Honvéd Budapest at the Hidegkuti Nándor Stadion on the 30th match day of the 2019–20 Nemzeti Bajnokság I season.

=== Vasas ===
On 2 February 2024, Szánthó joined Vasas.

== Career statistics ==
As of 15 May 2022

Appearances and goals by club, season and competition
Club	Season	League			Magyar Kupa		Continental		Other		Total	
Club	Season	Division	Apps	Goals	Apps	Goals	Apps	Goals	Apps	Goals	Apps	Goals
Győr	2017–18	Nemzeti Bajnokság II	17	3	3	2	—		—		20	5
Győr	2018–19	Nemzeti Bajnokság II	24	1	1	0	—		—		25	1
Győr	2019–20	Nemzeti Bajnokság II	18	6	1	1	—		—		19	7
Győr	Total		59	10	5	3	0	0	0	0	64	13
Soroksár (loan)	2019–20	Nemzeti Bajnokság II	6	2	0	0	—		—		6	2
Zalaegerszeg (loan)	2020–21	Nemzeti Bajnokság I	27	10	2	1	—		—		29	11
Ferencváros	2019–20	Nemzeti Bajnokság I	1	0	0	0	0	0	—		1	0
Ferencváros	2020–21	Nemzeti Bajnokság I	6	0	2	0	3 (Note: One appearance in UEFA Champions League, two appearances in UEFA Europa League)	0	—		11	0
Ferencváros	Total		7	0	2	0	3	0	0	0	12	0
Career total			99	22	9	4	3	0	0	0	112	15

== Honours ==
Žilina

- Slovak Cup: 2025–26

Individual

- Slovak Super Liga Goal of the Month: March 2023
