= Vladimir Veselinov =

Serbian footballer

Personal information
- Full name: Vladimir Veselinov
- Date of birth: 25 May 1984 (age 42)
- Place of birth: Subotica, SFR Yugoslavia
- Height: 1.75 m (5 ft 9 in)
- Position: Midfielder

Senior career*
Years	Team	Apps	(Gls)
2001–2002	Spartak Subotica	15	(0)
2002–2004	Radnički Bajmok	28	(4)
2004–2007	Spartak Subotica	82	(11)
2007–2008	Banat Zrenjanin	21	(0)
2009–2011	Spartak Subotica	45	(4)
2012–2014	Neman Grodno	62	(4)
2015–2016	Szeged	17	(2)
2016–2020	Budafok	70	(1)
- * Club domestic league appearances and goals as of 30 June 2020

Vladimir Veselinov (Serbian Cyrillic: Владимир Веселинов; born 25 May 1984) is a Serbian former professional footballer who played as a midfielder.
