= Attila Filkor =

Hungarian footballer (born 1988)

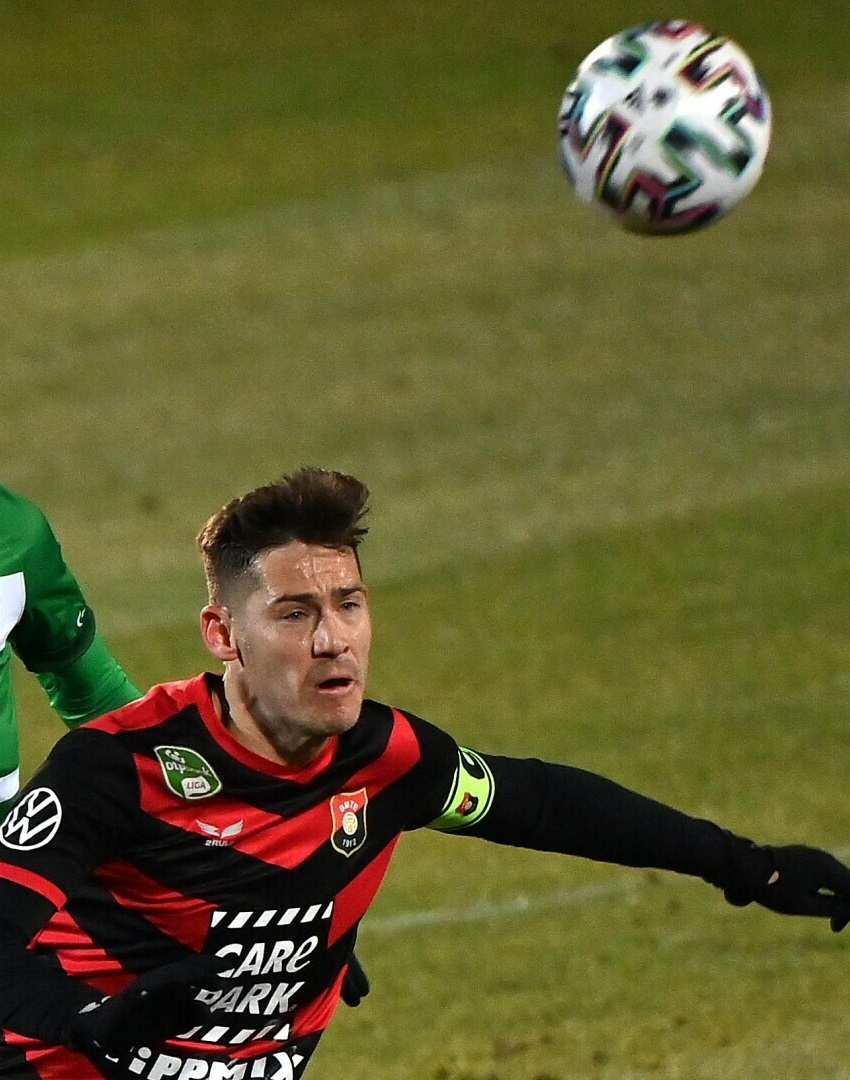
- Filkor playing for Budafok in 2021

Personal information
- Date of birth: 12 July 1988 (age 38)
- Place of birth: Budapest, Hungary
- Height: 1.81 m (5 ft 11 in)
- Position: Central midfielder

Youth career
- 2003–2006: MTK
- 2006: Pietà Hotspurs
- 2006–2008: Inter Milan

Senior career*
Years	Team	Apps	(Gls)
2006–2010	Inter Milan	0	(0)
2008	→ Grosseto (loan)	14	(0)
2008–2010	→ Sassuolo (loan)	15	(0)
2010	→ Gallipoli (loan)	12	(0)
2010–2015	AC Milan	0	(0)
2010–2011	→ Triestina (loan)	26	(2)
2011–2012	→ Livorno (loan)	26	(0)
2012–2013	→ Bari (loan)	10	(0)
2013	→ Pro Vercelli (loan)	11	(0)
2013–2014	→ Châteauroux (loan)	13	(0)
2014–2015	→ Avellino (loan)	4	(0)
2015–2016	Újpest	7	(0)
2016–2017	Gyirmót	16	(1)
2017–2022	Budafok	100	(2)
2022–	Budafok II	0	(0)

International career
	Hungary U-17	1	(0)
	Hungary U-19	9	(1)
	Hungary U-21	4	(2)
2007–2008	Hungary	6	(0)
- * Club domestic league appearances and goals as of 16 October 2022

Attila Filkor (born 12 July 1988) is a Hungarian former professional footballer who played as a Central midfielder.

== Club career ==
=== Early career ===
Born in Budapest, Filkor started playing football with local side MTK, before joining Maltese club Pietà Hotspurs on 22 August 2006 on free transfer. Before he moved to Malta, Internazionale had contacted MTK for a possible transfer of Filkor in July 2006. As Pietà Hotspurs were ranked in category 3 of the FIFA training compensation distribution scheme, Hotspurs were supposed to pay MTK €70,000 (€30,000 times 2 seasons plus €10,000) and should Internazionale sign him directly, it was supposed to pay MTK €160,000 (average of category 1 and 2 times 2 seasons plus €10,000) as training compensation. MTK alleged that the transfer to Malta was the plan of Inter to save cost on training compensation regulated by FIFA.

=== Inter Milan ===
On 25 August 2006, he was transferred to Inter Milan for €90,000 (and ITC arrived on 31 August), where he played in their youth team. During the season, he made also his first-team debut in a 2006–07 Coppa Italia game against Messina, on 9 November 2006.

However, failing to get much playing time, in January 2008 he was loaned out to Serie B side Grosseto in order to gain some first team experience. During his six months at Grosseto, Filkor won a total of 14 first team appearances, but only four of them as a starter.

For the 2008–09 season, Inter loaned Filkor out again, this time to Sassuolo, a newly promoted Serie B team. He made a total of 15 league in one season and a half spent at the club, before leaving for Gallipoli, on another loan spell, for the remainder of the 2009–10 season.

On 30 July 2009, the Court of Arbitration for Sport ordered Inter to pay MTK €144,000 for training compensation (€160,000 times 90% due to MTK fault).

=== AC Milan ===
In July 2010, he completed a move to crosstown rivals AC Milan, along with fellow Inter Milan players Cristian Daminuţă and Marco Fossati for a combined fee of €7 million. (Filkor was valued €1 million.) However, soon thereafter, he was loaned to Serie B side Triestina for the season. In July 2011 he was loaned out again to Livorno, another Serie B club. The following season, he was sent on a third straight loan spell in Serie B, this time at Bari. However, during the January transfer window he was called back and loaned to Pro Vercelli. For 2013–14 season he moved to France, joining Ligue 2 side Châteauroux on loan. On 1 September 2014 he was signed by Avellino.

=== Return to Hungary ===
In summer 2015 Filkor was signed by Újpest FC. In summer 2016 he was signed by Gyirmót SE.

== International career ==
Filkor was called up for the Hungary national football team in 2007. He was on the bench against Canada, in a match between the two sides on 15 November 2006. He made his international début on the pitch on 7 February 2007 in the last 5 minutes of a 2–0 win against Latvia in a friendly. He has also captained the Hungarian U-19 side.
