= 2020–21 Nemzeti Bajnokság I =

Nemzeti Bajnokság I
- Season: 2020–21
- Dates: 14 August 2020 – 8 May 2021
- Champions: Ferencváros
- Relegated: Diósgyőr; Budafok
- Champions League: Ferencváros
- Europa Conference League: Puskás Akadémia; Fehérvár; Újpest

The 2020–21 Nemzeti Bajnokság I (also known as 2020–21 OTP Bank Liga), also known as NB I, is the 122nd season of top-tier football in Hungary. The league was officially named OTP Bank Liga for sponsorship reasons. Ferencváros were the defending champions.

== Effects of the COVID-19 pandemic ==
On 16 August 2020, the match between Puskás Akadémia FC and Budapest Honvéd FC was postponed due to the fact that one player was tested positive for coronavirus.

== Teams ==
Debrecen and Kaposvár finished the 2019–20 Nemzeti Bajnokság I in the last two places and thus were relegated to NB II division.

The two relegated teams were replaced with the top two teams in 2019–20 Nemzeti Bajnokság II, champion MTK and runner-up Budafok, each having the required licence for top-division play.

=== Stadium and locations ===
Following is the list of clubs competing in the league this season, with their location, stadium and stadium capacity.

Team	Location	Stadium	Capacity	2019–20
Budafok	Budapest (Budafok)	Promontor utcai Stadion	4,000	2nd (NB II)
Diósgyőr	Miskolc (Diósgyőr)	Diósgyőri Stadion	15,325	9th
Fehérvár	Székesfehérvár	MOL Aréna Sóstó	14,144	2nd
Ferencváros	Budapest (Ferencváros)	Groupama Aréna	22,043	1st
Honvéd	Budapest (Kispest)	Bozsik Aréna (Note: Budapest Honvéd play their home matches at the Hidegkuti Nándor Stadion due to the reconstruction of their home stadium, Bozsik Stadion.)	8,000	5th
Kisvárda	Kisvárda	Várkerti Stadion	2,993	8th
Mezőkövesd	Mezőkövesd	Városi Stadion	4,183	4th
MTK	Budapest	Hidegkuti Nándor Stadion	5,014	1st (NB II)
Puskás Akadémia	Felcsút	Pancho Aréna	3,816	3rd
Paks	Paks	Fehérvári úti Stadion	6,150	10th
Újpest	Budapest (Újpest)	Szusza Ferenc Stadion	12,670	6th
Zalaegerszeg	Zalaegerszeg	ZTE Aréna	11,200	7th

Budafok	Diósgyőr	Fehérvár	Ferencváros
Promontor utcai Stadion	Diósgyőri Stadion; UEFA Category 4 Stadium	MOL Aréna Sóstó; UEFA Category 4 Stadium	Groupama Aréna; UEFA Category 4 Stadium
Capacity: 4,000	Capacity: 15,325	Capacity: 14,144	Capacity: 22,043
Honvéd	Location of teams in 2019–20 Nemzeti Bajnokság I Location of Budapest teams		Kisvárda
Hidegkuti Nándor Stadion; UEFA Category 3 Stadium	Location of teams in 2019–20 Nemzeti Bajnokság I Location of Budapest teams		Várkerti Stadion
Capacity: 5,014	Location of teams in 2019–20 Nemzeti Bajnokság I Location of Budapest teams		Capacity: 2,993
Mezőkövesd	Location of teams in 2019–20 Nemzeti Bajnokság I Location of Budapest teams		MTK
Városi-Stadion	Location of teams in 2019–20 Nemzeti Bajnokság I Location of Budapest teams		Hidegkuti Nándor Stadion; UEFA Category 3 Stadium
Capacity: 4,183	Location of teams in 2019–20 Nemzeti Bajnokság I Location of Budapest teams		Capacity: 5,014
Paks	Puskás Akadémia	Újpest	Zalaegerszeg
Fehérvári úti Stadion	Pancho Aréna; UEFA Category 2 Stadium	Szusza Ferenc Stadion	ZTE Arena
Capacity: 6,150	Capacity: 3,816	Capacity: 12,670	Capacity: 11,200

=== Personnel and kits ===
All teams are obligated to have the logo of the league sponsor OTP Bank as well as the Nemzeti Bajnokság I logo on the right sleeve of their shirt. Hungarian national sports betting brand Tippmix has sponsored all 12 teams of the first league since February 2019; their logo is therefore present on all team kits.

Note: Flags indicate national team as has been defined under FIFA eligibility rules. Players and Managers may hold more than one non-FIFA nationality.

Team	Chairman	Head coach	Captain	Kit manufacturer	Shirt sponsor
Budafok	(Hungary) Sándor Vízi	(Hungary) Bálint Pacsi	(Hungary) Dávid Kovács	(Hungary) 2Rule	Care Park, nb1.hu
Diósgyőr	(Hungary) Gergely Sántha	(Croatia) Zoran Zekić	(Hungary) Bence Iszlai	(Hungary) 2Rule	Borsodi
Fehérvár	(Hungary) István Garancsi	(Hungary) Imre Szabics	(Hungary) Nemanja Nikolić	(Germany) Adidas	MOL
Ferencváros	(Hungary) Gábor Kubatov	(Ukraine) Serhii Rebrov	(Hungary) Gergő Lovrencsics	(United States) Nike	Magyar Telekom
Honvéd	(Hungary) Zoltán Bozó	(Hungary) Ferenc Horváth	(Bosnia and Herzegovina) Đorđe Kamber	(Italy) Macron	Tippmix
Kisvárda	(Hungary) Attila Révész	(Hungary) Attila Supka	(Brazil) Lucas	(Germany) Adidas	MasterGood
Mezőkövesd	(Hungary) András Tállai	(Hungary) Attila Pintér	(Hungary) Tamás Cseri	(Spain) Joma	Zsóry Bath
MTK	(Hungary) Tamás Deutsch	(Germany) Michael Boris	(Hungary) József Kanta	(United States) Nike	Prohuman
Paks	(Hungary) János Süli	(Hungary) György Bognár	(Hungary) Zsolt Gévay	(Germany) Jako	Tippmix
Puskás Akadémia	(Hungary) Lőrinc Mészáros	(Slovakia) Zsolt Hornyák	(Hungary) Lajos Hegedűs	(Hungary) 2Rule	Mészáros & Mészáros
Újpest	(Belgium) Roland Duchâtelet	(Germany) Michael Oenning	(Hungary) Róbert Litauszki	(Germany) Puma	Volkswagen Centrum
Zalaegerszeg	(Hungary) Gábor Végh	(Hungary) Róbert Waltner	(Hungary) Benjamin Babati	(Hungary) 2Rule	ZÁÉV

=== Managerial changes ===
Team	Outgoing manager	Manner of departure	Date of vacancy	Position in table	Incoming manager	Date of appointment	Ref.
Kisvárda	(Hungary) Tamás Bódog	Mutual consent	29 June 2020	Pre-season	(Hungary) Attila Supka	8 July 2020	
Honvéd	(Hungary) István Pisont (ad int.)	End of interim spell	30 June 2020	Pre-season	(Hungary) Tamás Bódog	1 July 2020	
Fehérvár	(Spain) Joan Carrillo	End of contract	6 July 2020	Pre-season	(Hungary) Gábor Márton	8 July 2020	
Zalaegerszeg	(Hungary) Gábor Márton	Signed by Fehérvár	8 July 2020	Pre-season	(Hungary) Gábor Boér	12 July 2020	
Paks	(Hungary) Gábor Osztermájer	Different role	22 September 2020	12th	(Hungary) György Bognár	22 September 2020	
Mezőkövesd	(Hungary) Attila Kuttor	Mutual consent	10 November 2020	12th	(Hungary) Attila Pintér	11 November 2020	
Honvéd	(Hungary) Tamás Bódog	Sacked	6 December 2020	12th	(Hungary) István Pisont	8 December 2020	
Diósgyőr	(Hungary) Tamás Feczkó	Sacked	8 December 2020	11th	(Slovakia) Gergely Geri	8 December 2020	
Újpest	(Serbia) Predrag Rogan	Sacked	23 December 2020	9th	(Germany) Michael Oenning	23 December 2020	
Diósgyőr	(Slovakia) Gergely Geri	Sacked	7 January 2021	12th	(Croatia) Zoran Zekić	7 January 2021	
Honvéd	(Hungary) István Pisont	Mutual consent	15 February 2021	11th	(Hungary) Ferenc Horváth	15 February 2021	
Fehérvár	(Hungary) Gábor Márton	Sacked	17 February 2021	3rd	(Hungary) Tamás Szalai (ad int.)	17 February 2020	
Zalaegerszeg	(Hungary) Gábor Boér	Sacked	15 March 2021	10th	(Hungary) Róbert Waltner	15 March 2021	
Fehérvár	(Hungary) Tamás Szalai (ad int.)	End of interim spell	1 April 2021	3rd	(Hungary) Imre Szabics	1 April 2021	
Budafok	(Hungary) Csaba Csizmadia	Resigned	25 April 2021	12th	(Hungary) Bálint Pacsi (ad int.)	27 April 2021	

== League table ==
=== Standings ===
Pos	Team	Pld	W	D	L	GF	GA	GD	Pts	Qualification or relegation
1	Ferencváros (C)	33	23	9	1	69	22	+47	78	Qualification for the Champions League first qualifying round
2	Puskás Akadémia	33	18	4	11	52	42	+10	58	Qualification for the Europa Conference League first qualifying round
3	Fehérvár	33	16	8	9	68	38	+30	56	Qualification for the Europa Conference League first qualifying round
4	Paks	33	14	8	11	76	64	+12	50	
5	Kisvárda	33	12	10	11	30	36	−6	46	
6	Újpest	33	12	6	15	46	67	−21	42	Qualification for the Europa Conference League second qualifying round (Note: Újpest qualified for the Europa Conference League second qualifying round as the 2020–21 Magyar Kupa winners.)
7	MTK	33	11	9	13	44	49	−5	42	
8	Mezőkövesd	33	11	9	13	40	46	−6	42	
9	Zalaegerszeg	33	10	7	16	58	58	0	37	
10	Honvéd	33	9	10	14	46	48	−2	37	
11	Diósgyőr (R)	33	9	6	18	34	53	−19	33	Relegation to the Nemzeti Bajnokság II
12	Budafok (R)	33	7	6	20	34	74	−40	27	Relegation to the Nemzeti Bajnokság II

Source: Hungarian Football Federation (in Hungarian), Soccerway
Rules for classification: 1) Points; 2) Matches won; 3) Goal difference; 4) Goals scored; 5) Head-to-head points; 6) Head-to-head goal difference; 7) Head-to-head away goals scored; 8) Fair play ranking; 9) Drawing of lots.
(C) Champions; (R) Relegated

=== Positions by round ===
The table lists the positions of teams after each week of matches. In order to preserve chronological evolvements, any postponed matches are not included to the round at which they were originally scheduled, but added to the full round they were played immediately afterwards.

Team ╲ Round	1	2	3	4	5	6	7	8	9	10	11	12	13	14	15	16	17	18	19	20	21	22	23	24	25	26	27	28	29	30	31	32	33
Budafok	1	2	8	10	11	8	4	3	4	6	7	7	7	7	9	11	11	11	10	11	9	10	9	10	11	11	11	11	11	12	12	12	12
Honvéd	8	11	12	11	12	10	10	9	10	11	11	12	12	11	10	10	10	9	9	10	11	11	11	9	9	9	9	9	9	9	10	10	10
Diósgyőr	2	5	4	8	10	12	12	11	12	9	9	11	11	12	12	12	12	12	12	12	12	12	12	12	12	12	12	12	12	11	11	11	11
Fehérvár	4	6	2	1	2	1	2	2	2	4	3	2	2	2	2	2	2	2	2	3	3	3	3	3	3	3	3	3	3	3	3	3	3
Ferencváros	6	8	5	2	4	2	1	1	1	1	1	1	1	1	1	1	1	1	1	1	1	1	1	1	1	1	1	1	1	1	1	1	1
Kisvárda	10	12	9	5	7	4	7	5	5	3	2	3	4	5	4	5	3	3	5	7	5	6	7	8	7	8	8	7	6	5	6	5	5
Mezőkövesd	11	9	7	3	5	6	11	12	11	12	12	9	10	9	8	8	8	7	7	6	7	7	6	5	5	5	5	6	8	8	7	8	8
MTK	7	1	3	7	8	11	9	8	7	5	4	6	6	4	5	3	4	5	4	5	4	4	4	4	4	4	4	5	5	6	5	6	7
Puskás Akadémia	9	4	1	4	1	3	6	7	6	7	6	4	5	3	3	4	6	4	3	2	2	2	2	2	2	2	2	2	2	2	2	2	2
Paks	12	10	11	12	9	7	3	4	3	2	5	5	3	6	6	6	5	6	6	4	6	5	5	6	6	7	6	4	4	4	4	4	4
Újpest	3	3	6	9	6	9	5	6	9	10	10	10	9	10	11	9	9	10	11	9	8	9	8	7	8	6	7	8	7	7	8	7	6
Zalaegerszeg	5	7	10	6	3	5	8	10	8	8	8	8	8	8	7	7	7	8	8	8	10	8	10	11	10	10	10	10	10	10	9	9	9

Leader and UEFA Champions League first qualifying round
UEFA Europa Conference League first qualifying round
Relegation to 2021–22 NB II

Source: https://adatbank.mlsz.hu/league/54/0/22649/33.html

== Results ==
=== Rounds 1–22 ===
Home \ Away	BDF	DIO	FEH	FER	HON	KIS	MEZ	MTK	PAK	PUS	UJP	ZAL
Budafok	—	2–1	1–4	0–3	1–2	2–1	0–1	2–2	2–3	0–3	1–1	3–1
Diósgyőr	1–1	—	0–4	1–3	2–4	2–0	2–1	1–1	1–2	3–0	3–0 (Note: The Diósgyőr v Újpest match was awarded as a 3–0 win to Diósgyőr.)	1–3
Fehérvár	4–1	3–0	—	1–1	1–2	3–0	0–0	1–2	1–1	3–1	5–1	2–0
Ferencváros	2–1	0–1	2–0	—	1–0	1–1	3–0	2–0	5–0	2–1	2–0	2–0
Honvéd	2–3	5–1	2–2	0–1	—	1–2	1–1	2–2	1–1	0–1	1–2	2–2
Kisvárda	0–0	1–0	2–1	0–2	0–0	—	0–0	0–2	3–1	0–3	1–1	2–1
Mezőkövesd	1–0	2–1	1–2	2–2	2–1	1–2	—	0–1	4–3	1–0	3–2	1–1
MTK	1–2	1–0	3–1	1–1	3–1	1–1	0–0	—	3–1	0–1	1–3	0–3
Paks	4–1	2–1	1–0	1–3	0–0	3–0	1–2	4–0	—	6–2	1–2	3–1
Puskás Akadémia	3–0	2–0	1–1	1–1	1–0	0–0	1–0	0–3	3–2	—	3–2	1–2
Újpest	1–1	1–0	0–5	0–4	2–1	2–4	1–0	0–4	1–1	1–2	—	3–2
Zalaegerszeg	1–3	3–1	3–3	1–2	2–4	1–2	3–0	2–0	4–4	1–2	3–0	—

Source: Hungarian Football Federation (in Hungarian), Soccerway
Legend: Blue = home team win; Yellow = draw; Red = away team win.

=== Rounds 23–33 ===
Home \ Away	BDF	DIO	FEH	FER	HON	KIS	MEZ	MTK	PAK	PUS	UJP	ZAL
Budafok	—	1–2	1–2	0–4	0–1	2–0	—	—	2–9	—	—	—
Diósgyőr	—	—	—	—	0–0	—	2–2	0–0	1–4	2–1	0–0	—
Fehérvár	—	1–3	—	1–2	—	—	—	—	2–2	—	4–0	—
Ferencváros	—	1–0	—	—	—	—	2–1	—	5–2	1–1	3–0	—
Honvéd	—	—	2–3	1–2	—	0–1	2–2	3–2	—	—	2–2	—
Kisvárda	—	0–1	0–0	0–0	—	—	—	—	5–1	0–1	—	—
Mezőkövesd	2–1	—	1–3	—	—	0–1	—	5–1	—	—	—	2–0
MTK	0–0	—	1–3	2–2	—	0–1	—	—	—	—	—	3–0
Paks	—	—	—	—	2–0	—	2–2	3–1	—	4–2	1–3	1–1
Puskás Akadémia	5–0	—	1–0	—	1–2	—	2–0	3–0	—	—	2–1	1–4
Újpest	2–0	—	—	—	—	3–0	3–0	1–3	—	—	—	5–4
Zalaegerszeg	5–0	2–0	0–2	2–2	0–1	0–0	—	—	—	—	—	—

Source: Hungarian Football Federation (in Hungarian), Soccerway
Legend: Blue = home team win; Yellow = draw; Red = away team win.

== Statistics ==
=== Top goalscorers ===
Rank	Player	Club	Goals
1	(Hungary) János Hahn	Paks	22
2	(Hungary) Nemanja Nikolić	Fehérvár	15
3	(Hungary) Dániel Gazdag	Honvéd	13
4	(Ukraine) Ivan Petryak	Fehérvár	12
4	(Albania) Myrto Uzuni	Ferencváros	12
6	(Hungary) Dávid Kovács	Budafok	11
6	(Norway) Tokmac Nguen	Ferencváros	11
8	(Hungary) Norbert Balogh	Honvéd	10
8	(Georgia (country)) Giorgi Beridze	Újpest	10
8	(Hungary) István Bognár	Paks	10
8	(Ivory Coast) Franck Boli	Ferencváros	10
8	(Hungary) Regő Szánthó	Zalaegerszeg	10

=== Hat-tricks ===
Player	For	Against	Result	Date	Round
(Norway) Tokmac Nguen	Ferencváros	Paks	5–0	11 September 2020	4
(Hungary) János Hahn	Paks	MTK	4–0	26 September 2020	5
(Hungary) János Hahn^{4}	Paks	Puskás Akadémia	6–2	7 November 2020	10
(Romania) Gheorghe Grozav	Diósgyőr	Fehérvár	3–1	20 February 2021	22
(Hungary) János Hahn	Paks	Budafok	9–2	24 April 2021	31

- ^{4} Player scored four goals.

== Awards ==
=== Monthly awards ===
Month	Player of the Month		Head coach of the Month		Goal of the Month		Goalkeeping of the Month		References
Month	Player	Club	Manager	Club	Player	Club	Player	Club	References
August	(Hungary) Krisztián Simon	Újpest	(Germany) Michael Boris	MTK Budapest	(Hungary) Gábor Molnár	Diósgyőr	(Hungary) Botond Antal	Diósgyőr	
September	(Hungary) Bence Gergényi	Zalaegerszeg	(Slovakia) Zsolt Hornyák	PAFC	(Hungary) Dániel Gazdag	Honvéd	(Hungary) Balázs Tóth	PAFC	
October	(Hungary) Loïc Négo	Fehérvár	(Ukraine) Serhii Rebrov	Ferencváros	(Hungary) Regő Szánthó	Zalaegerszeg	(Hungary) Dániel Póser	Budafok	
November	(Hungary) János Hahn	Paks	(Hungary) Attila Supka	Kisvárda	(Georgia (country)) Giorgi Beridze	Újpest	(Hungary) Péter Szappanos	Mezőkövesd	
December	(Nigeria) Funsho Bamgboye	Fehérvár	(Ukraine) Serhii Rebrov	Ferencváros	(Croatia) Josip Knežević	PAFC	(Hungary) Dániel Póser	Budafok	
January	(Hungary) Dániel Gazdag	Honvéd	(Slovakia) Zsolt Hornyák	PAFC	(Hungary) Patrik Hidi	Honvéd	(Hungary) Bence Somodi	MTK Budapest	
February	(Hungary) Roland Varga	MTK Budapest	(Slovakia) Zsolt Hornyák	PAFC	(Hungary) Zoltán Horváth	Kisvárda	(Hungary) Balázs Tóth	PAFC	
March	(Ivory Coast) Franck Boli	Ferencváros	(Slovakia) Zsolt Hornyák	PAFC	(France) Yohan Croizet	Újpest	(Hungary) Balázs Bese	Budafok	

== See also ==
- 2020–21 Magyar Kupa
- 2020–21 Nemzeti Bajnokság II
- 2020–21 Nemzeti Bajnokság III
- 2020–21 Megyei Bajnokság I
