= 2019–20 Nemzeti Bajnokság II =

Nemzeti Bajnokság II
- Season: 2019–20
- Promoted: MTK Budapest; Budafok
- Relegated: Tiszakécske; Vác; Balmazújváros
- All statistics correct as of 15 July 2019.

The 2019–20 Nemzeti Bajnokság II (also known as 2019–20 Merkantil Bank Liga) is Hungary's 69th season of the Nemzeti Bajnokság II, the second tier of the Hungarian football league system. On 29 July 2019, it was announced that Balmazújváros did not receive license from the Hungarian Football Federation. On 29 August 2019 it was confirmed that Balmazújváros's license was suspended. Therefore, the 2019-20 Nemzeti Bajnokság would continue with 19 teams only.

On 4 May 2020 season was suspended due to the COVID-19 pandemic.

== Team changes ==
Promoted from 2018–19 Nemzeti Bajnokság III	Relegated from 2018–19 Nemzeti Bajnokság I
Ajka (West)	MTK Budapest
Szeged-Csanád Grosics Akadémia (Center)	Szombathelyi Haladás
Szolnok (East)	
Promoted to 2019–20 Nemzeti Bajnokság I	Relegated to 2019–20 Nemzeti Bajnokság III
Zalaegerszeg	Cegléd
Kaposvár	Mosonmagyaróvár
	Monor

== Stadiums by capacity ==
Team	Location	Stadium	Capacity
Ajka	Ajka		
Balmazújváros	Balmazújváros	Városi Sportpálya	2,435
Békéscsaba	Békéscsaba	Kórház utcai	4,963
Budafok	Budapest, Budafok	Promontor utcai	4,000
Budaörs	Budaörs	Árok utcai	1,204
Aqvital	Csákvár	Tersztyánszky Ödön	2,500
Dorog	Dorog	Buzánszky Jenő	12,000
Gyirmót	Győr	Ménfői úti	4,500
Győr	Győr	ETO Park	16,000
Kazincbarcika	Kazincbarcika	Pete András	8,000
MTK Budapest	Budapest, Józsefváros	Hidegkuti Nándor Stadion	5,322
Nyíregyháza Spartacus	Nyíregyháza	Városi	10,500
Siófok	Siófok	Révész Géza utcai	6,500
Soroksár	Budapest, Soroksár	Szamosi Mihály	5,000
Szeged-Csanád	Szeged	Szent Gellért Fórum	8,256
Szolnok	Szolnok	Tiszaligeti Stadion	4,000
Szombathelyi Haladás	Szombathely	Haladás Sportkomplexum	8,903
Tiszakécske	Tiszakécske	Városi Stadion	4,500
Vác	Vác	Ligeti	9,000
Vasas	Budapest	Illovszky Rudolf	5,054

== Stadiums by locations ==
Location of teams in 2019–20 Nemzeti Bajnokság II
Location of Budapest teams.

== Personnel and kits ==
Team	Manager	Captain	Kit manufacturer	Shirt sponsor
Balmazújváros	(Croatia) Toni Golem	(Hungary)	Adidas	Kamilla Gyógyfürdő
Békéscsaba	(Hungary) Gábor Boér	(Hungary)	Saller	Békés Drén
Budafok	(Hungary) Csaba Csizmadia	(Hungary)	Mitre	Care Park
Budaörs	(Hungary) György Bognár	(Hungary) Ádám Csobánki	Ziccer	Volkswagen
Csákvár	(Hungary) István Szíjjártó	(Hungary)	2Rule	Euroaszfalt
Dorog	(Hungary) Pál Balogh	(Hungary) Illés Sitku	Adidas	Pannon Falap-Lemez
Gyirmót	(Hungary) László Szepessy	(Hungary)	Jako	Alcufer
Győr	(Hungary) József Király	(Hungary)	Adidas	WKW
Kazincbarcika	(Hungary) György Gálhidi	(Hungary)	Adidas	KolorCity
MTK Budapest	(Germany) Michael Boris	(Hungary) József Kanta	Nike	Panzi Pet
Nyíregyháza	(Serbia) Zoran Spišljak	(Hungary) -	Jako	Révész
Siófok	(Hungary) István Mihalecz	(Hungary) -	Nike	HunGast
Soroksár	(Hungary) Péter Lipcsei	(Hungary)	Nike	
Szombathelyi Haladás	(Hungary) Attila Supka	(Hungary)	2Rule	Szuperagro
Tiszakécske	(Hungary) István Szabó	(Hungary)	2Rule	Duna Aszfalt
Vác	(Hungary) Károly Horváth (coach)	(Hungary) Csaba Hegedűs	Nike	Sláger FM
Vasas	(Hungary) Károly Szanyó	(Hungary)	Adidas	Alprosys

== League table ==
Pos	Team	Pld	W	D	L	GF	GA	GD	Pts	Promotion or relegation
1	MTK Budapest (C, P)	27	18	5	4	60	33	+27	59	Promotion to Nemzeti Bajnokság I
2	Budafok (P)	27	16	6	5	42	23	+19	54	Promotion to Nemzeti Bajnokság I
3	Vasas	27	14	5	8	55	39	+16	47	
4	Csákvár	26	13	4	9	40	43	−3	43	
5	Siófok	26	11	9	6	40	31	+9	42	
6	Győr	27	11	8	8	36	32	+4	41	
7	Gyirmót	27	10	8	9	32	29	+3	38	
8	Nyíregyháza	27	11	2	14	45	45	0	35	
9	Ajka	26	10	5	11	41	40	+1	35	
10	Soroksár	26	10	5	11	38	44	−6	35	
11	Budaörs	26	10	4	12	38	37	+1	34	
12	Szeged-Csanád GA	26	8	10	8	31	29	+2	34	
13	Dorog	26	9	6	11	29	29	0	33	
14	Kazincbarcika	27	8	9	10	33	38	−5	33	
15	Békéscsaba	26	8	8	10	30	35	−5	32	
16	Szolnok	26	7	10	9	22	27	−5	31	
17	Szombathelyi Haladás	27	7	9	11	32	34	−2	30	
18	Tiszakécske (R)	27	7	5	15	25	50	−25	26	Relegation to Nemzeti Bajnokság III
19	Vác (R)	27	2	6	19	17	48	−31	12	Relegation to Nemzeti Bajnokság III
20	Balmazújváros (Note: Suspended.) (D)	0	0	0	0	0	0	0	0	Suspended

Updated to match(es) played on 14 March 2020. Source:
Rules for classification: 1st points; 2nd overall wins; 3rd goal difference; 4th head-to-head points; 5th head-to-head goal difference; 6th head-to-head away goals scored; 7th fair-play points; 8th drawing of lots
(C) Champions; (D) Disqualified; (P) Promoted; (R) Relegated
Notes:

Notes

- Note 1: suspended

== See also ==
- 2019–20 Magyar Kupa
- 2019–20 Nemzeti Bajnokság I
- 2019–20 Nemzeti Bajnokság III
- 2019–20 Megyei Bajnokság I
