= Budafoki MTE =

Association football club in Hungary

- Full name: Budafoki Munkás Testedző Egyesület
- Short name: BMTE
- Founded: 1912; 114 years ago
- Ground: Promontor utcai Stadion
- Capacity: 1,200
- Chairman: Sándor Vízi
- Manager: János Lázok
- League: NB III
- 2025–26: NB II, 15th of 16 (relegated)
- Website: budafok1912.hu
Home colours

Budafoki Munkás Testedző Egyesület is a Hungarian football club from the town of Budafok, Budapest, Hungary. The club currently plays in the Nemzeti Bajnokság III.

== History ==
The club was founded in 1912 as Világosság Football Club. At that time, Budafok was not part of Budapest; it joined the capital city only in 1950, along with other towns such as Újpest and Kispest.

Budafok mostly played in the second division of Hungarian football hierarchy, the Nemzeti Bajnokság II between World War I and World War II. However, the club got promoted and debuted in the 1945–46 season of the Hungarian League, and finished ninth. The manager of the club in the top division was the legendary Gusztáv Sebes.

After the fall of Communism, there was a high risk that the club would be dissolved just like many other clubs in Hungary. At that time, Hungarovin, the wine-producing company financed the club. However, the company was sold to Henkell during the privatisation in Hungary. The new owner, Henkell wanted to expand its Budafok factory and wanted to use the club's football stadium too for this purpose. The club was very close to dissolution at this point. However, two sports leaders, Sándor Vízi and Rezső Gallow started to negotiate, aiming to take the football club out of the privatisation and thus to find a way to save football in Budafok. In the end, they succeeded and the football stadium was excluded from the privatisation of the company and a new era started in the life of the club.

=== 2010s ===
In 2015, János Jakab a former Budafok player became the president of the club. Jakab, who also managed MEDOSZ Erdért (the former club of Prime Minister of Hungary, Viktor Orbán) and who was also president of the Puskás Akadémia FC had excellent contacts in the Hungarian football. Jakab was searching for new investors for the football club. He met Róbert Bélteky, a Hungarian-Australian entrepreneur, whom he managed to convince that it is a great opportunity to invest in the club, which then opened a new chapter in the life of Budafok. Bélteky was not new to football, he was the owner of the most popular Australian association football club, Melbourne Victory FC. When Bélteky was asked about the purchase in an interview with Nemzeti Sport, he explained: "I wanted to purchase a club and then see it prospering", "I did not want to buy a club from the first league and my friend Jakab suggested Budafok". Eventually, Bélteky purchased the 95% of the club, while the remaining 5% shares now belong to the Foundation for Budafoki Football.

Budafok merged with Újbuda FC, which allowed the club to advance from the Budapest league to the Nemzeti Bajnokság III. The club started the competitions in the 2015-16 Nemzeti Bajnokság III season. The club finished fourth in that season. After the strong start, Budafok stepped up an other level, and won the 2016-17 Nemzeti Bajnokság III season with manager László Prukner, while the club managed to reach the semi-finals of the 2016-17 Magyar Kupa, where they were beaten by Ferencvárosi TC.

In 2017, the club signed former Inter Milan and A.C. Milan striker Attila Filkor.

On 13 May 2017, Budafok won the 2016–17 Nemzeti Bajnokság III season thereby gaining promotion to the 2017–18 Nemzeti Bajnokság II season.

On 29 June 2017 it was announced by the club that their former player, Lóránt Oláh, became the sport director.

In the 8th round of the 2018–19 Magyar Kupa season, Budafok were eliminated by MOL Vidi FC.

In 2020, the club was promoted to the Nemzeti Bajnokság. Due to the COVID-19 pandemic, the 2019–20 Nemzeti Bajnokság II was interrupted and finally terminated in May. The club was the second at that time, therefore they were promoted to the 2020–21 Nemzeti Bajnokság I.

=== 2020s ===
Bélteky, the owner of the club and resident of Australia, might miss the first match of the 2020–21 Nemzeti Bajnokság I season due to the COVID-19 pandemic.

In the 2020–21 Nemzeti Bajnokság I season, Budafok finished 12th; therefore, they were relegated to the second division.

In the 2022–23 Magyar Kupa season, Budafok reached the final for the first time in the club's history. Budafok beat Iváncsa 2-1 in Iváncsa on 8 February 2023. On 1 March 2023, Budafok beat Kisvárda 2-0 in the quarter-final at home. On 5 April 2023, Budafok beat Nemzet Bajnokság I club Vasas SC in the semi-final 3-0 thanks to Péter Beke's hat-trick. On 3 May 2023, Budafok lost 2-0 to Zalaegerszeg in the 2023 Magyar Kupa final at the Puskás Aréna.

On 18 March 2025, Géza Mészöly was appointed as the manager of the club.

== Current squad ==
As of 20 January 2026

Note: Flags indicate national team as defined under FIFA eligibility rules; some limited exceptions apply. Players may hold more than one non-FIFA nationality.

No.	Pos.	Nation	Player
1	GK	HUN	Máté Ecseri
3	DF	HUN	Donát Horgosi
4	DF	HUN	Dávid Kálnoki-Kis
5	DF	HUN	Ander Lapu (on loan from Paks)
6	MF	HUN	Botond Nándori
8	MF	HUN	Márió Németh
9	FW	HUN	Zoltán Vasvári
10	FW	HUN	Dávid Kovács (captain)
11	FW	HUN	Csaba Bukta (on loan from Vasas)
14	MF	HUN	Bertalan Kun
15	MF	SYR	Subhi Kazmouz
20	FW	HUN	Bálint Rehó
21	FW	HUN	György Varga (on loan from Újpest)

No.	Pos.	Nation	Player
22	FW	HUN	Alexander Torvund
23	DF	HUN	Bálint Selyem (on loan from Győri ETO II)
26	DF	HUN	Márk Jagodics
27	FW	HUN	Bence Korponai
29	GK	HUN	András Horváth
30	MF	HUN	Patrik Posztobányi
37	MF	HUN	Máté Fekete
50	DF	HUN	Zalán Debreceni
51	GK	HUN	András Hársfalvi
96	MF	HUN	Gábor Stumpf (on loan from MTK Budapest II)
97	FW	HUN	Roland Hajdú
98	FW	HUN	Máté Gyurkó (on loan from Kisvárda)

== Naming history ==
- 1912–1913: Világosság Football Csapat
- 1913–1919: Budafoki Atlétikai és Football Club
- 1919–1922: Budafoki Munkás Testedző Egyesület
- 1922–1950: Budafoki Műkedvelő Testedző Egyesület
- 1950: merger with Budapesti Gyárépítők
- 1950–1951: Budapesti Gyárépítők MTE
- 1951–1956: Budapesti Gyárépítők SK
- 1956–1957: Budafoki Építők Munkás Testedző Egyesüle
- 1957–?: Budafoki MTE Kinizsi Sportegyesület
- 1988–1992: Budafoki MTE-Törley
- 1993–2006: Budafoki LC
- 2006–2007: Budafoki Lombard Labdarúgó "Club"
- 2007–2017: Budafoki Labdarúgó Club
- 2017– : Budafoki MTE

== Honours ==
- Nemzeti Bajnokság II
  - Runners-up (3): 1948–49, 1949–50, 2019–20
- Nemzeti Bajnokság III
  - Winners (4): 1972–73, 1985–86, 1988–89, 2016–17
  - Runners-up (2): 1971–72, 1982–83
- Magyar Kupa
  - Runners-up (1): 2022–23

== Seasons ==
=== League positions ===
As of 26 July 2025

- Between 2000–01 and 2004–05 the third tier league called NB II.

== Seasons ==
As of 25 May 2026

Domestic												International		Manager	
League											Cup	International		Manager	
Div.	No.	Season	MP	W	D	L	GF	GA	Dif.	Pts.	Cup	Pos.	Competition	Manager	Result
NBI	1.	1945–46	0	0	0	0	0	0	+0	0	TBD	TBD	Did not qualify		(Hungary)
NBIII	?.	2016–17	34	28	3	3	75	24	+51	87	1st	R16	Did not qualify		(Hungary) Prukner
NBII	?.	2017–18	38	12	9	17	42	56	–14	45	14th	R32	Did not qualify		(Hungary) Tóth, (Hungary) Gálhidi
NBII	?.	2018–19	38	12	5	21	46	66	–20	41	16th	R32	Did not qualify		(Hungary) Vitelki, (Hungary) Csizmadia
NBII ↑	?.	2019–20	27	16	6	5	42	23	+19	54	2nd	R32	Did not qualify		(Hungary) Csizmadia
NBI ↓	2.	2020–21	33	7	6	20	34	74	–40	27	12th	QF	Did not qualify		(Hungary) Csizmadia
NBII	?.	2021-22	38	11	9	18	39	50	–11	42	14th	R16	Did not qualify		(Hungary) Csizmadia
NBII	?.	2022-23	38	12	11	15	39	46	–7	47	10th	R	Did not qualify		(Hungary) Csizmadia, (Hungary) Mátyus
NBII	?.	2023-24	34	12	8	14	37	44	–7	44	8th	?	Did not qualify		?
NBII	?.	2024-25	30	9	8	13	44	53	–9	35	13th	?	Did not qualify		?
NBII	?.	2025-26	30	7	8	15	33	49	–16	29	15th	?	Did not qualify		?

Notes

- Note 1:
- R64: Round of 64

Other Notes

- Italics: in progress
- R: Runners-up
- SF: Semi-finals
- QF: Quarter-finals
- GS: Group stage
- PO: Play-offs
