= 2014–15 Puskás Akadémia FC season =

Puskás Akadémia
2014–15 season
- Chairman: István Garancsi
- Manager: Miklós Benczés
- Nemzeti Bajnokság I: 10th
- Magyar Kupa: Round of 32
- Ligakupa: Group stage
| Home colours | Away colours | Third colours |

The 2014–15 season was Puskás Akadémia Football Club's 2nd competitive season, 2nd consecutive season in the Nemzeti Bajnokság I and 4th year in existence as a football club. In addition to the domestic league, Puskás Akadémia participated in this season's editions of the Magyar Kupa and Ligakupa.

== Squad ==
=== Current squad ===
As of 14 September 2014. Note: Flags indicate national team as defined under FIFA eligibility rules; some limited exceptions apply. Players may hold more than one non-FIFA nationality.

| No. | Pos. | Nation | Player |
|---|---|---|---|
| 2 | DF | BRA | Fábio Guarú |
| 3 | DF | CRO | Renato Kelić |
| 4 | DF | HUN | Márk Tamás |
| 5 | DF | HUN | Zoltán Szélesi |
| 6 | DF | HUN | Gergő Gohér |
| 8 | MF | HUN | Máté Papp (loan from Videoton) |
| 9 | FW | HUN | Patrik Tischler |
| 10 | FW | SVK | Zoltán Harsányi (loan from Mezőkövesd) |
| 11 | FW | HUN | Roland Sallai |
| 13 | MF | HUN | Andor Margitics |
| 14 | MF | MNE | Stefan Denković |
| 18 | MF | HUN | Attila Polonkai |

| No. | Pos. | Nation | Player |
|---|---|---|---|
| 20 | MF | HUN | Balázs Tóth (loan from Videoton) |
| 21 | GK | SVK | Ľuboš Hajdúch |
| 22 | DF | HUN | Zsolt Tar (loan from Videoton) |
| 23 | DF | HUN | Csaba Spandler |
| 29 | FW | HUN | László Lencse |
| 42 | DF | HUN | Márton Lorentz (loan from Videoton) |
| 44 | GK | SRB | Branislav Danilović |
| 70 | MF | HUN | László Tóth |
| 77 | MF | HUN | Péter Czvitkovics |
| 88 | MF | HUN | Dénes Szakály |
| 91 | DF | HUN | Gergő Vaszicsku |
| 99 | FW | HUN | Gábor Makrai |

== Transfers ==
=== Summer ===
In: Note: Flags indicate national team as defined under FIFA eligibility rules; some limited exceptions apply. Players may hold more than one non-FIFA nationality.

| No. | Pos. | Nation | Player |
|---|---|---|---|
| — | FW | HUN | László Lencse (from Videoton) |
| — | MF | HUN | Balázs Tóth (loan from Videoton) |
| — | DF | HUN | Zsolt Tar (loan from Videoton II) |
| — | FW | SVK | Zoltán Harsányi (loan from Mezőkövesd) |
| — | MF | HUN | Máté Papp (loan from Videoton) |
| — | MF | HUN | Martin Hudák (loan from Videoton II) |
| — | MF | HUN | Dénes Szakály (from Videoton) |
| — | DF | HUN | Gergő Gohér (from Diósgyőr) |
| — | GK | SRB | Branislav Danilović (from (Serbia) Rad) |
| — | DF | CRO | Renato Kelić (from (Italy) Padova) |
| — | DF | HUN | Csaba Vachtler (loan return from Balmazújváros) |
| — | FW | HUN | Roland Baracskai (loan return from Videoton II) |
| — | MF | HUN | Zsolt Gajdos (loan return from Békéscsaba) |
| — | MF | HUN | Bálint Károly (loan return from Békéscsaba) |
| — | MF | HUN | Márk Barcsay (loan return from Videoton II) |
| — | FW | HUN | Tibor Molnár (loan return from Videoton II) |

Out: Note: Flags indicate national team as defined under FIFA eligibility rules; some limited exceptions apply. Players may hold more than one non-FIFA nationality.

| No. | Pos. | Nation | Player |
|---|---|---|---|
| 6 | MF | HUN | Gáspár Orbán (retired) |
| 7 | DF | GRE | Vassilios Apostolopoulos (loan return to Videoton) |
| 11 | MF | HUN | Márk Barcsay (loan to Csákvár) |
| 11 | MF | HUN | István Berki (to Siófok) |
| 13 | GK | HUN | Bence Somodi (to Kaposvár) |
| 19 | MF | HUN | Zsolt Gajdos (loan to Csákvár) |
| 20 | MF | HUN | Balázs Tóth (loan return to Videoton) |
| 22 | DF | HUN | Tamás Vaskó |
| 25 | DF | HUN | Zsolt Nagy (loan to Videoton) |
| 26 | MF | HUN | Lajos Bertus (to Paks) |
| 29 | FW | HUN | László Lencse (loan return to Videoton) |
| 30 | MF | HUN | Norbert Farkas (to Zalaegerszeg) |
| 33 | DF | HUN | Balázs Tóth |
| 35 | FW | HUN | Tibor Molnár (loan to Csákvár) |
| 42 | DF | HUN | Márton Lorentz (loan return to Videoton II) |
| 47 | FW | HUN | János Hahn (to Paks) |
| 71 | MF | ESP | Francisco Gallardo (retired) |
| 88 | MF | HUN | Dénes Szakály (loan return to Videoton) |
| 89 | DF | HUN | Adrián Szekeres (loan return to Videoton) |

- List of Hungarian football transfers summer 2014

== Competitions ==
=== Overview ===
| Competition | First match | Last match | Starting round | Final position | Record | | | | | | | |
| Competition | First match | Last match | Starting round | Final position | Pld | W | D | L | GF | GA | GD | Win % |
|---|---|---|---|---|---|---|---|---|---|---|---|---|
| Nemzeti Bajnokság I | 27 July 2014 | 30 May 2015 | Matchday 1 | 10th | 30 | 10 | 5 | 15 | 35 | 40 | −5 | 33.33 |
| Magyar Kupa | 12 August 2014 | 24 September 2014 | Round of 128 | Round of 32 | 3 | 2 | 0 | 1 | 8 | 4 | +4 | 66.67 |
| Ligakupa | 2 September 2014 | 18 November 2014 | Group stage | Group stage | 6 | 1 | 1 | 4 | 6 | 12 | −6 | 16.67 |
| Total | | | | | 39 | 13 | 6 | 20 | 49 | 56 | −7 | 33.33 |

Source: Competitions

=== Nemzeti Bajnokság I ===
==== League table ====
| Pos | Team | Pld | W | D | L | GF | GA | GD | Pts | Qualification or relegation |
|---|---|---|---|---|---|---|---|---|---|---|
| 8 | Győr (R) | 30 | 10 | 8 | 12 | 41 | 44 | −3 | 38 | Relegation to Nemzeti Bajnokság III (Note: Győr won't be a member of 2015–16 Nemzeti Bajnokság I due to financial and licence problems) |
| 9 | Kecskemét (R) | 30 | 10 | 8 | 12 | 30 | 39 | −9 | 38 | Dissolved - Kecskeméti LC KTE SI in the Bács-Kiskun County Football League One as successor (Note: Kecskemét, Nyíregyháza and Pécs won't be members of 2015–16 Nemzeti Bajnokság I due to licence problems) |
| 10 | Puskás Akadémia | 30 | 10 | 5 | 15 | 35 | 40 | −5 | 35 | |
| 11 | Pécs (R) | 30 | 8 | 7 | 15 | 32 | 51 | −19 | 31 | Relegation to Baranya County Football League One |
| 12 | Nyíregyháza (R) | 30 | 8 | 6 | 16 | 33 | 49 | −16 | 30 | Relegation to Nemzeti Bajnokság III |

Source: mlsz.hu (in Hungarian)
Rules for classification: 1st points; 2nd overall wins; 3rd goal difference; 4th head-to-head points; 5th head-to-head goal difference; 6th head-to-head away goals scored; 7th fair-play points; 8th drawing of lots
(R) Relegated

=== Results summary ===
| Overall | | | | | | | | Home | | | | | | Away | | | | | |
| Pld | W | D | L | GF | GA | GD | Pts | W | D | L | GF | GA | GD | W | D | L | GF | GA | GD |
|---|---|---|---|---|---|---|---|---|---|---|---|---|---|---|---|---|---|---|---|
| 30 | 10 | 5 | 15 | 35 | 40 | −5 | 35 | 6 | 4 | 5 | 24 | 18 | +6 | 4 | 1 | 10 | 11 | 22 | −11 |

Source: Hungarian Football Federation

=== Results by round ===
| Round | 1 | 2 | 3 | 4 | 5 | 6 | 7 | 8 | 9 | 10 | 11 | 12 | 13 | 14 | 15 | 16 | 17 | 18 | 19 | 20 | 21 | 22 | 23 | 24 | 25 | 26 | 27 | 28 | 29 | 30 |
|---|---|---|---|---|---|---|---|---|---|---|---|---|---|---|---|---|---|---|---|---|---|---|---|---|---|---|---|---|---|---|
| Ground | A | H | A | H | A | A | A | H | H | H | A | H | A | A | H | H | A | H | A | H | H | H | A | A | A | H | A | H | H | A |
| Result | L | D | L | D | L | L | L | W | W | W | W | L | L | D | W | W | W | L | L | D | D | L | W | W | L | L | L | W | L | L |
| Position | 10 | 11 | 14 | 14 | 14 | 15 | 16 | 14 | 13 | 9 | 8 | 10 | 10 | 10 | 10 | 9 | 8 | 9 | 9 | 9 | 10 | 10 | 9 | 9 | 9 | 9 | 10 | 10 | 10 | 10 |

Source: Matches
A = Away; H = Home; W = Win; D = Draw; L = Loss

=== Matches ===
| 27 July 2014 1 | Diósgyőr | 2–1 | Puskás Akadémia | Miskolc |
| 18:30 CEST (UTC+2) | Husić 50'; Bacsa 72' | Report | Lencse 90+2' | Stadium: DVTK Stadion; Attendance: 4,314; Referee: Tamás Bognár |

| 1 August 2014 2 | Puskás Akadémia | 2–2 | Pécs | Felcsút |
| 19:00 CEST (UTC+2) | Lencse 6' (pen.); Čaušić 88' (o.g.) | Report | Márkvárt 37'; Kővári 62' | Stadium: Pancho Arena; Attendance: 1,077; Referee: Péter Solymosi |

| 9 August 2014 3 | Debrecen | 2–0 | Puskás Akadémia | Debrecen |
| 20:30 CEST (UTC+2) | Zsidai 34', 89' | Report | | Stadium: Nagyerdei Stadion; Attendance: 5,114; Referee: Mihály Fábián |

| 15 August 2014 4 | Puskás Akadémia | 1–1 | Paks | Felcsút |
| 19:00 CEST (UTC+2) | Tóth 7' | Report | Könyves 79' | Stadium: Pancho Arena; Attendance: 1,292; Referee: József Erdős |

| 22 August 2014 5 | Honvéd | 1–0 | Puskás Akadémia | Budapest |
| 19:00 CEST (UTC+2) | Alcibiade 87' | Report | | Stadium: Bozsik Stadion; Attendance: 1,000; Referee: Tamás Bognár |

| 30 August 2014 6 | Videoton | 3–0 | Puskás Akadémia | Székesfehérvár |
| 20:30 CEST (UTC+2) | Gyurcsó 26'; Nikolić 69', 76' | Report | | Stadium: Sóstói Stadion; Attendance: 3,085; Referee: Viktor Kassai |

| 14 September 2014 7 | Ferencváros | 2–1 | Puskás Akadémia | Budapest |
| 18:30 CEST (UTC+2) | Lauth 23'; Böde 24' | Report | Sallai 79' | Stadium: Groupama Arena; Attendance: 7,082; Referee: Zsolt Szabó |

| 20 September 2014 8 | Puskás Akadémia | 3–0 | Pápa | Felcsút |
| 20:30 CEST (UTC+2) | Szakály 7'; Tischler 42'; Sallai 88' | Report | | Stadium: Pancho Arena; Attendance: 500; Referee: József Erdős |

| 27 September 2014 9 | Puskás Akadémia | 3–2 | Dunaújváros | Felcsút |
| 18:30 CEST (UTC+2) | Lorentz 61'; Szakály 69'; Tischler 78' | Report | Orosz 40'; Perić 45' | Stadium: Pancho Arena; Attendance: 800; Referee: István Vad |

| 3 October 2014 10 | Puskás Akadémia | 2–1 | Győr | Felcsút |
| 19:00 CEST (UTC+2) | Lencse 42'; Tischler 70' | Report | Rudolf 19' (pen.) | Stadium: Pancho Arena; Attendance: 1,521; Referee: Péter Solymosi |

| 18 October 2014 11 | Nyíregyháza | 0–1 | Puskás Akadémia | Nyíregyháza |
| 16:00 CEST (UTC+2) | | Report | Tischler 37' | Stadium: Városi Stadion; Attendance: 1,686; Referee: Sándor Andó-Szabó |

| 25 October 2014 12 | Puskás Akadémia | 0–1 | MTK Budapest | Felcsút |
| 14:00 CEST (UTC+2) | | Report | Pölöskei 26' | Stadium: Pancho Arena; Attendance: 1,457; Referee: Csaba Pintér |

== Magyar Kupa ==
| 12 August 2014 Round of 128 | Andráshida | 1–3 | Puskás Akadémia | Zalaegerszeg |
| 17:00 CEST (UTC+2) | Tóth 79' | Report | Tóth 17'; Tischler 37', 76' | Stadium: Andráshida Sporttelep; Referee: Gábor Barna |

| 9 September 2014 Round of 64 | Orosháza | 1–5 | Puskás Akadémia | Orosháza |
| 15:30 CEST (UTC+2) | Lovas 46' | Report | Tischler 8', 17', 20', 25', 71' | Stadium: Mátrai- Stadion; Attendance: 500; Referee: Tamás Nazsa |

| 24 September 2014 Round of 32 | Puskás Akadémia | 0–2 | Debrecen | Felcsút |
| 15:00 CEST (UTC+2) | | Report | Szakály 53'; Kulcsár 90+4' | Stadium: Pancho Arena; Attendance: 200; Referee: Csaba Pintér |

== Ligakupa ==
=== Group stage ===
| Pos | Team | Pld | W | D | L | GF | GA | GD | Pts | Qualification | SZI | PÉC | SOR | PUS |
|---|---|---|---|---|---|---|---|---|---|---|---|---|---|---|
| 1 | Szigetszentmiklós | 6 | 3 | 2 | 1 | 10 | 3 | +7 | 11 | Advance to knockout phase | — | 0–1 | 4–0 | 2–0 |
| 2 | Pécs | 6 | 3 | 2 | 1 | 8 | 5 | +3 | 11 | Advance to knockout phase | 1–1 | — | 2–1 | 0–0 |
| 3 | Soroksár | 6 | 2 | 1 | 3 | 8 | 12 | −4 | 7 | | 1–1 | 0–2 | — | 3–2 |
| 4 | Puskás Akadémia | 6 | 1 | 1 | 4 | 6 | 12 | −6 | 4 | | 0–2 | 3–2 | 1–3 | — |

Source: Soccerway

| 2 September 2014 1 | Soroksár | 3–2 | Puskás Akadémia | Budapest |
| 16:30 CEST (UTC+2) | Hodgyai 22'; Kocsis 37'; Szabó 82' | Report | Sallai 67'; Szakály 88' | Stadium: Sporttelep Mihály Szamosi; Attendance: 250; Referee: Gábor Barna |

| 16 September 2014 2 | Puskás Akadémia | 0–2 | Szigetszentmiklós | Felcsút |
| 16:00 CEST (UTC+2) | | Report | Kollega 70'; Földi 90+1' | Stadium: Pancho Arena; Attendance: 200; Referee: Béla Botló |

| 7 October 2014 3 | Pécs | 0–0 | Puskás Akadémia | Pécs |
| 18:00 CEST (UTC+2) | | Report | | Stadium: Stadion PMFC; Attendance: 200; Referee: József Berger |

| 15 October 2014 4 | Puskás Akadémia | 3–2 | Pécs | Felcsút |
| 15:00 CEST (UTC+2) | Lencse 45'; Tischler 70'; Papp 80' | Report | Romić 9'; Frank 35' | Stadium: Pancho Arena; Attendance: 300; Referee: Szabolcs Szilasi |

== Statistics ==
=== Appearances and goals ===
Last updated on 26 October 2014.

| No. | Pos | Nat | Player | Total | | Nemzeti Bajnokság I | | Magyar Kupa | | Ligakupa | |
| No. | Pos | Nat | Player | Apps | Goals | Apps | Goals | Apps | Goals | Apps | Goals |
|---|---|---|---|---|---|---|---|---|---|---|---|
| 2 | DF | (Brazil) BRA | Fábio Guarú | 6 | 0 | 3 | 0 | 1 | 0 | 2 | 0 |
| 3 | DF | (Croatia) CRO | Renato Kelić | 13 | 0 | 9 | 0 | 2 | 0 | 2 | 0 |
| 4 | DF | (Hungary) HUN | Márk Tamás | 13 | 0 | 11 | 0 | 1 | 0 | 1 | 0 |
| 5 | DF | (Hungary) HUN | Zoltán Szélesi | 13 | 0 | 11 | 0 | 1 | 0 | 1 | 0 |
| 6 | DF | (Hungary) HUN | Gergő Gohér | 12 | 0 | 6 | 0 | 2 | 0 | 4 | 0 |
| 8 | MF | (Hungary) HUN | Máté Papp | 11 | 1 | 5 | 0 | 2 | 0 | 4 | 1 |
| 9 | FW | (Hungary) HUN | Patrik Tischler | 17 | 12 | 12 | 4 | 3 | 7 | 2 | 1 |
| 10 | FW | (Slovakia) SVK | Zoltán Harsányi | 12 | 0 | 7 | 0 | 2 | 0 | 3 | 0 |
| 11 | FW | (Hungary) HUN | Roland Sallai | 11 | 3 | 5 | 2 | 3 | 0 | 3 | 1 |
| 13 | MF | (Hungary) HUN | Andor Margitics | 7 | 0 | 3 | 0 | 1 | 0 | 3 | 0 |
| 14 | FW | (Montenegro) MNE | Stefan Denković | 10 | 0 | 8 | 0 | 1 | 0 | 1 | 0 |
| 18 | MF | (Hungary) HUN | Attila Polonkai | 13 | 0 | 11 | 0 | 1 | 0 | 1 | 0 |
| 20 | MF | (Hungary) HUN | Balázs Tóth | 10 | 1 | 9 | 1 | 1 | 0 | 0 | 0 |
| 21 | GK | (Slovakia) SVK | Ľuboš Hajdúch | 8 | -13 | 2 | -4 | 2 | -3 | 4 | -6 |
| 22 | DF | (Hungary) HUN | Zsolt Tar | 8 | 0 | 1 | 0 | 3 | 0 | 4 | 0 |
| 23 | DF | (Hungary) HUN | Csaba Spandler | 5 | 0 | 4 | 0 | 1 | 0 | 0 | 0 |
| 29 | FW | (Hungary) HUN | László Lencse | 14 | 4 | 12 | 3 | 1 | 0 | 1 | 1 |
| 42 | DF | (Hungary) HUN | Márton Lorentz | 10 | 1 | 6 | 1 | 2 | 0 | 2 | 0 |
| 44 | GK | (Serbia) SRB | Branislav Danilović | 12 | -15 | 10 | -13 | 1 | -1 | 1 | -1 |
| 70 | MF | (Hungary) HUN | László Tóth | 4 | 1 | 1 | 0 | 2 | 1 | 1 | 0 |
| 77 | MF | (Hungary) HUN | Péter Czvitkovics | 14 | 0 | 9 | 0 | 3 | 0 | 2 | 0 |
| 88 | MF | (Hungary) HUN | Dénes Szakály | 14 | 3 | 10 | 2 | 2 | 0 | 2 | 1 |
| 91 | DF | (Hungary) HUN | Gergő Vaszicsku | 13 | 0 | 10 | 0 | 0 | 0 | 3 | 0 |
| 99 | FW | (Hungary) HUN | Gábor Makrai | 5 | 0 | 3 | 0 | 2 | 0 | 0 | 0 |
Youth players:
| 7 | MF | (Hungary) HUN | Martin Hudák | 5 | 0 | 0 | 0 | 2 | 0 | 3 | 0 |
| 9 | FW | (Hungary) HUN | Alex Damásdi | 1 | 0 | 0 | 0 | 0 | 0 | 1 | 0 |
| 14 | MF | (Hungary) HUN | Dávid Mészáros | 2 | 0 | 0 | 0 | 0 | 0 | 2 | 0 |
| 50 | FW | (Hungary) HUN | Erik Németh | 3 | 0 | 0 | 0 | 0 | 0 | 3 | 0 |
| 51 | FW | (Hungary) HUN | Zsolt Óvári | 1 | 0 | 0 | 0 | 0 | 0 | 1 | 0 |
| 55 | DF | (Hungary) HUN | Bencze Koronczi | 1 | 0 | 0 | 0 | 0 | 0 | 1 | 0 |
| 70 | MF | (Hungary) HUN | Tibor Oldal | 2 | 0 | 0 | 0 | 0 | 0 | 2 | 0 |
Players no longer at the club:

=== Top scorers ===
Includes all competitive matches. The list is sorted by shirt number when total goals are equal.

Last updated on 26 October 2014

| Position | Nation | Number | Name | Nemzeti Bajnokság I | Magyar Kupa | Ligakupa | Total |
|---|---|---|---|---|---|---|---|
| 1 | (Hungary) | 9 | Patrik Tischler | 4 | 7 | 1 | 12 |
| 2 | (Hungary) | 29 | László Lencse | 3 | 0 | 1 | 4 |
| 3 | (Hungary) | 11 | Roland Sallai | 2 | 0 | 1 | 3 |
| 4 | (Hungary) | 88 | Dénes Szakály | 2 | 0 | 1 | 3 |
| 5 | (Hungary) | 20 | Balázs Tóth | 1 | 0 | 0 | 1 |
| 6 | (Hungary) | 42 | Márton Lorentz | 1 | 0 | 0 | 1 |
| 7 | (Hungary) | 70 | László Tóth | 0 | 1 | 0 | 1 |
| 8 | (Hungary) | 8 | Máté Papp | 0 | 0 | 1 | 1 |
| / | / | / | Own Goals | 1 | 0 | 0 | 1 |
| | | | TOTALS | 14 | 8 | 5 | 27 |

=== Disciplinary record ===
Includes all competitive matches. Players with 1 card or more included only.

Last updated on 26 October 2014

| Position | Nation | Number | Name | Nemzeti Bajnokság I | | Magyar Kupa | | Ligakupa | | Total (Hu Total) | |
| Position | Nation | Number | Name | Booked | Sent off (straight red) | Booked | Sent off (straight red) | Booked | Sent off (straight red) | Booked | Sent off (straight red) |
| DF | (Brazil) | 2 | Fábio Guarú | 1 | 0 | 0 | 0 | 0 | 0 | 1 (1) | 0 (0) |
| DF | (Croatia) | 3 | Renato Kelić | 3 | 1 | 1 | 0 | 0 | 0 | 4 (3) | 1 (1) |
| DF | (Hungary) | 4 | Márk Tamás | 1 | 0 | 0 | 0 | 0 | 0 | 1 (1) | 0 (0) |
| DF | (Hungary) | 5 | Zoltán Szélesi | 2 | 0 | 0 | 0 | 0 | 0 | 2 (2) | 0 (0) |
| DF | (Hungary) | 6 | Gergő Gohér | 1 | 0 | 0 | 0 | 0 | 0 | 1 (1) | 0 (0) |
| MF | (Hungary) | 7 | Martin Hudák | 0 | 0 | 1 | 0 | 0 | 0 | 1 (0) | 0 (0) |
| MF | (Hungary) | 8 | Máté Papp | 0 | 0 | 0 | 0 | 1 | 0 | 1 (0) | 0 (0) |
| FW | (Hungary) | 9 | Patrik Tischler | 1 | 0 | 0 | 0 | 1 | 0 | 2 (1) | 0 (0) |
| FW | (Slovakia) | 10 | Zoltán Harsányi | 1 | 0 | 1 | 0 | 1 | 0 | 3 (1) | 0 (0) |
| MF | (Montenegro) | 14 | Stefan Denković | 1 | 0 | 0 | 0 | 0 | 0 | 1 (1) | 0 (0) |
| MF | (Hungary) | 20 | Balázs Tóth | 3 | 0 | 0 | 0 | 0 | 0 | 3 (3) | 0 (0) |
| DF | (Hungary) | 22 | Zsolt Tar | 0 | 0 | 0 | 0 | 2 | 0 | 2 (0) | 0 (0) |
| DF | (Hungary) | 23 | Csaba Spandler | 1 | 0 | 0 | 0 | 0 | 0 | 1 (1) | 0 (0) |
| FW | (Hungary) | 29 | László Lencse | 4 | 0 | 0 | 0 | 0 | 0 | 4 (4) | 0 (0) |
| DF | (Hungary) | 42 | Márton Lorentz | 0 | 1 | 1 | 0 | 1 | 0 | 2 (0) | 1 (0) |
| GK | (Serbia) | 44 | Branislav Danilović | 1 | 0 | 0 | 0 | 0 | 0 | 1 (1) | 0 (0) |
| MF | (Hungary) | 88 | Dénes Szakály | 1 | 0 | 0 | 0 | 0 | 0 | 1 (1) | 0 (0) |
| DF | (Hungary) | 91 | Gergő Vaszicsku | 5 | 0 | 0 | 0 | 1 | 0 | 6 (5) | 0 (0) |
| FW | (Hungary) | 99 | Gábor Makrai | 2 | 0 | 0 | 0 | 0 | 0 | 2 (2) | 0 (0) |
| | | | TOTALS | 28 | 2 | 4 | 0 | 7 | 0 | 39 (28) | 2 (2) |

=== Clean sheets ===
| Position | Nation | Number | Name | Nemzeti Bajnokság I | Magyar Kupa | Ligakupa | Total |
|---|---|---|---|---|---|---|---|
| | (Slovakia) | 21 | Ľuboš Hajdúch | | | | |
| | (Serbia) | 44 | Branislav Danilović | | | | |
| | | | TOTALS | | | | |
