= 2013–14 Puskás Akadémia FC season =

Puskás Akadémia
2013–14 season
- Chairman: István Garancsi
- Manager: Miklós Benczés
- Nemzeti Bajnokság I: 14th
- Magyar Kupa: Round of 32
- Ligakupa: Quarter-finals
- Top goalscorer: League: László Lencse (15); All: László Lencse (21)
- Highest home attendance: 3,633 vs Videoton (26 April 2014)
- Lowest home attendance: 50 vs Ceglédi (19 November 2013)
| Home colours | Away colours | Third colours |

The 2013–14 season was Puskás Akadémia Football Club's 1st season in the Nemzeti Bajnokság I (took right to the departure from Felcsút FC) and 3rd year in existence as a football club. In addition to the domestic league, Puskás Akadémia participated in this season's editions of the Magyar Kupa and Ligakupa.

== First team squad ==
Note: Flags indicate national team as defined under FIFA eligibility rules; some limited exceptions apply. Players may hold more than one non-FIFA nationality.

| No. | Pos. | Nation | Player |
|---|---|---|---|
| 2 | DF | BRA | Fabio Guarú |
| 4 | DF | HUN | Márk Tamás |
| 5 | DF | HUN | Zoltán Szélesi |
| 6 | MF | HUN | Gáspár Orbán |
| 7 | DF | GRE | Vassilios Apostolopoulos (loan from Videoton) |
| 9 | FW | HUN | Patrik Tischler |
| 11 | MF | HUN | István Berki |
| 12 | FW | HUN | Zsolt Óvári |
| 13 | GK | HUN | Bence Somodi |
| 14 | FW | MNE | Stefan Denković |
| 17 | MF | HUN | Andor Margitics |
| 18 | MF | HUN | Attila Polonkai |
| 20 | MF | HUN | Balázs II Tóth (loan from Videoton) |
| 21 | GK | SVK | Ľuboš Hajdúch |

| No. | Pos. | Nation | Player |
|---|---|---|---|
| 22 | DF | HUN | Tamás Vaskó |
| 25 | MF | HUN | Zsolt Nagy |
| 26 | MF | HUN | Lajos Bertus |
| 29 | FW | HUN | László Lencse (loan from Videoton) |
| 30 | MF | HUN | Norbert Farkas |
| 33 | DF | HUN | Balázs Tóth |
| 42 | DF | HUN | Márton Lorentz |
| 45 | FW | HUN | Erik Németh |
| 70 | MF | HUN | László Tóth |
| 71 | MF | ESP | Francisco Gallardo |
| 77 | MF | HUN | Péter Czvitkovics |
| 88 | MF | HUN | Dénes Szakály (loan from Videoton) |
| 89 | DF | HUN | Adrián Szekeres (loan from Videoton) |
| 91 | DF | HUN | Gergő Vaszicsku |

== Transfers ==
=== Summer ===
In: Note: Flags indicate national team as defined under FIFA eligibility rules; some limited exceptions apply. Players may hold more than one non-FIFA nationality.

| No. | Pos. | Nation | Player |
|---|---|---|---|
| 4 | DF | HUN | Márk Tamás (from Videoton II) |
| 7 | DF | GRE | Vassilios Apostolopoulos (loan from Videoton) |
| 9 | FW | HUN | Patrik Tischler (from MTK) |
| 10 | MF | SRB | Uroš Nikolić (loan from Videoton) |
| 11 | MF | HUN | Márk Barcsay (from Videoton Academy) |
| 20 | MF | HUN | Bálint Károly (from Videoton II) |
| 21 | GK | SVK | Ľuboš Hajdúch (from Kaposvár) |
| 24 | DF | HUN | Csaba Vachtler (from Videoton II) |
| 26 | MF | HUN | Lajos Bertus (from Kecskemét) |
| 29 | FW | HUN | László Lencse (loan from Videoton) |
| 35 | MF | HUN | Tibor Molnár (from Videoton II) |
| 41 | GK | HUN | Marcell Papp (from Videoton II) |
| 70 | MF | HUN | László Tóth (from Felcsút) |
| 71 | MF | ESP | Francisco Gallardo (from Diósgyőr) |
| 77 | MF | HUN | Péter Czvitkovics (from Debrecen) |
| 80 | FW | HUN | Zsolt Haraszti (loan from Videoton) |
| 88 | MF | HUN | Dénes Szakály (loan from Videoton) |
| 89 | DF | HUN | Adrián Szekeres (loan from Videoton) |
| 90 | DF | FRA | Mamadou Wague (from Debrecen) |
| 95 | MF | HUN | Donát Szelei (from Felcsút) |

Out: Note: Flags indicate national team as defined under FIFA eligibility rules; some limited exceptions apply. Players may hold more than one non-FIFA nationality.

| No. | Pos. | Nation | Player |
|---|---|---|---|
| 4 | DF | HUN | Szilárd Papp (to Siófok) |
| 5 | MF | HUN | János Soós (to Békéscsaba) |
| 6 | FW | HUN | Gáspár Orbán (to Videoton II) |
| 7 | DF | GRE | Vassilios Apostolopoulos (loan return to Videoton) |
| 10 | MF | HUN | László Kleinheisler (to Videoton) |
| 11 | MF | NGA | Moris Enete (to Videoton) |
| 16 | MF | HUN | Dániel Nagy (loan return to Videoton) |
| 23 | GK | HUN | Zoltán Czirjék (to Zalaegerszeg) |
| 29 | MF | HUN | Zsolt Nagy (loan return to Videoton II) |
| 88 | MF | HUN | Dénes Szakály (loan return to Videoton) |

=== Winter ===
In: Note: Flags indicate national team as defined under FIFA eligibility rules; some limited exceptions apply. Players may hold more than one non-FIFA nationality.

| No. | Pos. | Nation | Player |
|---|---|---|---|
| 6 | MF | HUN | Gáspár Orbán (loan return from Videoton II) |
| 11 | MF | HUN | István Berki (from Csákvár) |
| 14 | FW | MNE | Stefan Denković (from (Serbia) Vojvodina) |
| 20 | MF | HUN | Balázs Tóth (loan from Videoton) |
| 22 | DF | HUN | Tamás Vaskó (from Mezőkövesd) |

Out: Note: Flags indicate national team as defined under FIFA eligibility rules; some limited exceptions apply. Players may hold more than one non-FIFA nationality.

| No. | Pos. | Nation | Player |
|---|---|---|---|
| 3 | DF | HUN | Barna Papucsek (to Szolnok) |
| 5 | MF | ESP | Miguel Luque |
| 8 | FW | HUN | Roland Baracskai (loan to Videoton II) |
| 10 | MF | SRB | Uroš Nikolić (loan return to Videoton) |
| 11 | MF | HUN | Márk Barcsay (loan to Videoton II) |
| 15 | FW | HUN | Róbert Zsolnai (to Szolnok) |
| 19 | FW | HUN | Zsolt Gajdos (loan to Békéscsaba) |
| 20 | MF | HUN | Bálint Károly (loan to Békéscsaba) |
| 24 | DF | HUN | Csaba Vachtler (loan to Balmazújváros) |
| 35 | FW | HUN | Tibor Molnár (loan to Videoton II) |
| 80 | FW | HUN | Zsolt Haraszti (loan return to Videoton) |
| 90 | DF | FRA | Mamadou Wague |

- List of Hungarian football transfers summer 2013
- List of Hungarian football transfers winter 2013–14

== Statistics ==
=== Appearances and goals ===
Last updated on 1 June 2014.

| No. | Pos | Nat | Player | Total | | OTP Bank Liga | | Magyar Kupa | | Ligakupa | |
| No. | Pos | Nat | Player | Apps | Goals | Apps | Goals | Apps | Goals | Apps | Goals |
|---|---|---|---|---|---|---|---|---|---|---|---|
| 2 | DF | (Brazil) BRA | Fabio Guarú | 19 | 0 | 14 | 0 | 1 | 0 | 4 | 0 |
| 4 | DF | (Hungary) HUN | Márk Tamás | 26 | 0 | 22 | 0 | 3 | 0 | 1 | 0 |
| 5 | DF | (Hungary) HUN | Zoltán Szélesi | 6 | 0 | 6 | 0 | 0 | 0 | 0 | 0 |
| 6 | MF | (Hungary) HUN | Gáspár Orbán | 6 | 0 | 2 | 0 | 0 | 0 | 4 | 0 |
| 7 | DF | (Greece) GRE | Vassilios Apostolopoulos | 2 | 0 | 1 | 0 | 0 | 0 | 1 | 0 |
| 9 | FW | (Hungary) HUN | Patrik Tischler | 34 | 10 | 28 | 9 | 1 | 0 | 5 | 1 |
| 11 | MF | (Hungary) HUN | István Berki | 6 | 0 | 4 | 0 | 0 | 0 | 2 | 0 |
| 12 | FW | (Hungary) HUN | Zsolt Óvári | 1 | 0 | 1 | 0 | 0 | 0 | 0 | 0 |
| 13 | GK | (Hungary) HUN | Bence Somodi | 14 | -23 | 7 | -13 | 2 | -4 | 5 | -6 |
| 14 | FW | (Montenegro) MNE | Stefan Denković | 15 | 1 | 12 | 0 | 0 | 0 | 3 | 1 |
| 17 | MF | (Hungary) HUN | Andor Margitics | 15 | 1 | 10 | 1 | 2 | 0 | 3 | 0 |
| 18 | MF | (Hungary) HUN | Attila Polonkai | 30 | 0 | 27 | 0 | 1 | 0 | 2 | 0 |
| 20 | MF | (Hungary) HUN | Balázs Tóth | 12 | 1 | 11 | 1 | 0 | 0 | 1 | 0 |
| 21 | GK | (Slovakia) SVK | Ľuboš Hajdúch | 29 | -41 | 25 | -38 | 1 | 0 | 3 | -3 |
| 22 | DF | (Hungary) HUN | Tamás Vaskó | 5 | 0 | 4 | 0 | 0 | 0 | 1 | 0 |
| 25 | MF | (Hungary) HUN | Zsolt Nagy | 15 | 0 | 8 | 0 | 1 | 0 | 6 | 0 |
| 26 | MF | (Hungary) HUN | Lajos Bertus | 18 | 0 | 7 | 0 | 2 | 0 | 9 | 0 |
| 29 | FW | (Hungary) HUN | László Lencse | 30 | 21 | 23 | 15 | 3 | 3 | 4 | 3 |
| 30 | MF | (Hungary) HUN | Norbert Farkas | 14 | 0 | 9 | 0 | 1 | 0 | 4 | 0 |
| 33 | DF | (Hungary) HUN | Balázs Tóth | 25 | 0 | 21 | 0 | 0 | 0 | 4 | 0 |
| 42 | DF | (Hungary) HUN | Márton Lorentz | 5 | 0 | 3 | 0 | 0 | 0 | 2 | 0 |
| 45 | FW | (Hungary) HUN | Erik Németh | 3 | 1 | 1 | 0 | 0 | 0 | 2 | 1 |
| 70 | MF | (Hungary) HUN | László Tóth | 6 | 1 | 3 | 0 | 0 | 0 | 3 | 1 |
| 71 | MF | (Spain) ESP | Francisco Gallardo | 26 | 1 | 20 | 1 | 2 | 0 | 4 | 0 |
| 77 | MF | (Hungary) HUN | Péter Czvitkovics | 32 | 4 | 25 | 2 | 2 | 1 | 5 | 1 |
| 88 | MF | (Hungary) HUN | Dénes Szakály | 18 | 3 | 14 | 3 | 0 | 0 | 4 | 0 |
| 89 | DF | (Hungary) HUN | Adrián Szekeres | 28 | 1 | 21 | 1 | 3 | 0 | 4 | 0 |
| 91 | DF | (Hungary) HUN | Gergő Vaszicsku | 34 | 2 | 27 | 1 | 1 | 0 | 6 | 1 |
Youth players:
| 41 | GK | (Hungary) HUN | Marcell Papp | 2 | -2 | 0 | 0 | 0 | 0 | 2 | -2 |
| 46 | DF | (Hungary) HUN | Csaba Spandler | 6 | 0 | 0 | 0 | 0 | 0 | 6 | 0 |
| 47 | FW | (Hungary) HUN | János Hahn | 2 | 0 | 0 | 0 | 0 | 0 | 2 | 0 |
| 47 | MF | (Hungary) HUN | Tibor Oldal | 1 | 1 | 0 | 0 | 0 | 0 | 1 | 1 |
| 48 | FW | (Hungary) HUN | Gábor Illés | 1 | 0 | 0 | 0 | 0 | 0 | 1 | 0 |
| 48 | MF | (Hungary) HUN | Roland Sallai | 1 | 0 | 0 | 0 | 0 | 0 | 1 | 0 |
Out to loan:
| 8 | FW | (Hungary) HUN | Roland Baracskai | 11 | 2 | 6 | 0 | 1 | 0 | 4 | 2 |
| 19 | FW | (Hungary) HUN | Zsolt Gajdos | 5 | 0 | 3 | 0 | 0 | 0 | 2 | 0 |
| 20 | MF | (Hungary) HUN | Bálint Károly | 3 | 0 | 1 | 0 | 0 | 0 | 2 | 0 |
| 24 | DF | (Hungary) HUN | Csaba Vachtler | 7 | 0 | 4 | 0 | 0 | 0 | 3 | 0 |
| 35 | FW | (Hungary) HUN | Tibor Molnár | 14 | 1 | 9 | 0 | 1 | 0 | 4 | 1 |
Players no longer at the club:
| 3 | DF | (Hungary) HUN | Barna Papucsek | 7 | 0 | 2 | 0 | 1 | 0 | 4 | 0 |
| 5 | MF | (Spain) ESP | Miguel Luque | 7 | 0 | 3 | 0 | 2 | 0 | 2 | 0 |
| 10 | MF | (Serbia) SRB | Uroš Nikolić | 16 | 1 | 9 | 1 | 3 | 0 | 4 | 0 |
| 15 | FW | (Hungary) HUN | Róbert Zsolnai | 17 | 4 | 10 | 0 | 3 | 1 | 4 | 3 |
| 80 | FW | (Hungary) HUN | Zsolt Haraszti | 16 | 3 | 10 | 1 | 3 | 1 | 3 | 1 |
| 90 | DF | (France) FRA | Mamadou Wague | 8 | 1 | 4 | 0 | 1 | 0 | 3 | 1 |

=== Top scorers ===
Includes all competitive matches. The list is sorted by shirt number when total goals are equal.

Last updated on 1 June 2014

| Position | Nation | Number | Name | OTP Bank Liga | Magyar Kupa | Ligakupa | Total |
|---|---|---|---|---|---|---|---|
| 1 | (Hungary) | 29 | László Lencse | 15 | 3 | 3 | 21 |
| 2 | (Hungary) | 9 | Patrik Tischler | 9 | 0 | 1 | 10 |
| 3 | (Hungary) | 77 | Péter Czvitkovics | 2 | 1 | 1 | 4 |
| 4 | (Hungary) | 15 | Róbert Zsolnai | 0 | 1 | 3 | 4 |
| 5 | (Hungary) | 88 | Dénes Szakály | 3 | 0 | 0 | 3 |
| 6 | (Hungary) | 80 | Zsolt Haraszti | 1 | 1 | 1 | 3 |
| 7 | (Hungary) | 91 | Gergő Vaszicsku | 1 | 0 | 1 | 2 |
| 8 | (Hungary) | 8 | Roland Baracskai | 0 | 0 | 2 | 2 |
| 9 | (Serbia) | 10 | Uroš Nikolić | 1 | 0 | 0 | 1 |
| 10 | (Spain) | 71 | Francisco Gallardo | 1 | 0 | 0 | 1 |
| 11 | (Hungary) | 31 | Andor Margitics | 1 | 0 | 0 | 1 |
| 12 | (Hungary) | 89 | Adrián Szekeres | 1 | 0 | 0 | 1 |
| 13 | (Hungary) | 20 | Balázs Tóth | 1 | 0 | 0 | 1 |
| 14 | (Hungary) | 35 | Tibor Molnár | 0 | 0 | 1 | 1 |
| 15 | (France) | 90 | Mamadou Wague | 0 | 0 | 1 | 1 |
| 16 | (Montenegro) | 14 | Stefan Denković | 0 | 0 | 1 | 1 |
| 17 | (Hungary) | 70 | László Tóth | 0 | 0 | 1 | 1 |
| 18 | (Hungary) | 7 | Erik Németh | 0 | 0 | 1 | 1 |
| 19 | (Hungary) | 47 | Tibor Oldal | 0 | 0 | 1 | 1 |
| / | / | / | Own Goals | 0 | 0 | 0 | 0 |
| | | | TOTALS | 36 | 6 | 18 | 60 |

=== Disciplinary record ===
Includes all competitive matches. Players with 1 card or more included only.

Last updated on 1 June 2014

| Position | Nation | Number | Name | OTP Bank Liga | | Magyar Kupa | | Ligakupa | | Total (Hu Total) | |
| Position | Nation | Number | Name | Booked | Sent off (straight red) | Booked | Sent off (straight red) | Booked | Sent off (straight red) | Booked | Sent off (straight red) |
| DF | (Brazil) | 2 | Fabio Guarú | 3 | 0 | 0 | 0 | 0 | 1 | 3 (3) | 1 (0) |
| DF | (Hungary) | 4 | Márk Tamás | 6 | 2 | 0 | 0 | 0 | 0 | 6 (6) | 2 (2) |
| MF | (Spain) | 5 | Miguel Luque | 1 | 0 | 1 | 0 | 1 | 0 | 3 (1) | 0 (0) |
| MF | (Hungary) | 6 | Gáspár Orbán | 0 | 0 | 0 | 0 | 1 | 0 | 1 (0) | 0 (0) |
| FW | (Hungary) | 8 | Roland Baracskai | 1 | 0 | 0 | 1 | 0 | 0 | 1 (1) | 1 (0) |
| FW | (Hungary) | 9 | Patrik Tischler | 1 | 0 | 0 | 0 | 0 | 1 | 1 (1) | 1 (0) |
| MF | (Serbia) | 10 | Uroš Nikolić | 1 | 0 | 0 | 0 | 0 | 0 | 1 (1) | 0 (0) |
| FW | (Montenegro) | 14 | Stefan Denković | 1 | 0 | 0 | 0 | 1 | 0 | 2 (1) | 0 (0) |
| FW | (Hungary) | 15 | Róbert Zsolnai | 1 | 0 | 1 | 0 | 0 | 0 | 2 (1) | 0 (0) |
| MF | (Hungary) | 17 | Andor Margitics | 1 | 1 | 0 | 0 | 0 | 0 | 1 (1) | 1 (1) |
| MF | (Hungary) | 18 | Attila Polonkai | 4 | 0 | 0 | 0 | 0 | 0 | 4 (4) | 0 (0) |
| MF | (Hungary) | 20 | Balázs Tóth | 3 | 1 | 0 | 0 | 0 | 0 | 3 (3) | 1 (1) |
| GK | (Slovakia) | 21 | Ľuboš Hajdúch | 1 | 1 | 0 | 0 | 0 | 0 | 1 (1) | 1 (1) |
| DF | (Hungary) | 22 | Tamás Vaskó | 2 | 0 | 0 | 0 | 1 | 0 | 3 (2) | 0 (0) |
| DF | (Hungary) | 24 | Csaba Vachtler | 1 | 0 | 0 | 0 | 0 | 0 | 1 (1) | 0 (0) |
| MF | (Hungary) | 25 | Zsolt Nagy | 2 | 0 | 0 | 0 | 2 | 0 | 4 (2) | 0 (0) |
| MF | (Hungary) | 26 | Lajos Bertus | 1 | 0 | 1 | 0 | 2 | 0 | 4 (1) | 0 (0) |
| FW | (Hungary) | 29 | László Lencse | 5 | 0 | 1 | 0 | 0 | 0 | 6 (5) | 0 (0) |
| MF | (Hungary) | 30 | Norbert Farkas | 6 | 0 | 0 | 0 | 1 | 1 | 7 (6) | 1 (0) |
| DF | (Hungary) | 33 | Balázs Tóth | 5 | 0 | 0 | 0 | 0 | 0 | 5 (5) | 0 (0) |
| FW | (Hungary) | 35 | Tibor Molnár | 1 | 0 | 0 | 0 | 0 | 0 | 1 (1) | 0 (0) |
| DF | (Hungary) | 42 | Márton Lorentz | 1 | 0 | 0 | 0 | 1 | 0 | 2 (1) | 0 (0) |
| FW | (Hungary) | 46 | Erik Németh | 0 | 0 | 0 | 0 | 1 | 0 | 1 (0) | 0 (0) |
| MF | (Spain) | 71 | Francisco Gallardo | 1 | 0 | 1 | 0 | 3 | 0 | 5 (1) | 0 (0) |
| MF | (Hungary) | 77 | Péter Czvitkovics | 1 | 0 | 0 | 0 | 0 | 0 | 1 (1) | 0 (0) |
| FW | (Hungary) | 80 | Zsolt Haraszti | 2 | 0 | 2 | 0 | 0 | 0 | 4 (2) | 0 (0) |
| DF | (Hungary) | 88 | Dénes Szakály | 1 | 0 | 0 | 0 | 0 | 0 | 1 (1) | 0 (0) |
| DF | (Hungary) | 89 | Adrián Szekeres | 4 | 1 | 0 | 0 | 0 | 0 | 4 (4) | 1 (1) |
| DF | (France) | 90 | Mamadou Wague | 0 | 1 | 1 | 0 | 0 | 0 | 1 (0) | 1 (1) |
| DF | (Hungary) | 91 | Gergő Vaszicsku | 5 | 1 | 0 | 0 | 0 | 0 | 5 (5) | 1 (1) |
| | | | TOTALS | 62 | 8 | 7 | 2 | 14 | 3 | 84 (62) | 12 (8) |

=== Overall ===
| Games played | 43 (30 OTP Bank Liga, 3 Magyar Kupa and 10 Ligakupa) |
| Games won | 16 (8 OTP Bank Liga, 2 Magyar Kupa and 6 Ligakupa) |
| Games drawn | 10 (7 OTP Bank Liga, 1 Magyar Kupa and 2 Ligakupa) |
| Games lost | 17 (15 OTP Bank Liga, 0 Magyar Kupa and 2 Ligakupa) |
| Goals scored | 62 |
| Goals conceded | 66 |
| Goal difference | -4 |
| Yellow cards | 84 |
| Red cards | 12 |
| Worst discipline | (Hungary) Márk Tamás (6 (yellow card) , 2 (red card) ) |
| Best result | 4–0 (H) v Mezőkövesd – OTP Bank Liga – 22-03-2014 |
| Worst result | 0–4 (H) v Budapest Honvéd – OTP Bank Liga – 08-03-2014 |
| Most appearances | (Hungary) Patrik Tischler (34 appearances) |
| Top scorer | (Hungary) László Lencse (21 goals) |
| Points | 58/129 (44.96%) |

Last updated: 1 June 2014

== Nemzeti Bajnokság I ==
=== Matches ===
| 26 July 2013 1 | Pápa | 1–1 | Puskás | Pápa, Veszprém County |
| 19:00 CEST | Eszlátyi 63' | (Report) | Vaszicsku 82' | Stadium: Stadion Várkerti; Attendance: 2,000; Referee: (Hungary) Zoltán Iványi |

| 3 August 2013 2 | Puskás | 1–2 | Újpest | Székesfehérvár, Fejér County |
| 21:00 CEST | Tischler 17' | (Report) | Kabát 23'; Ahjupera 61' | Stadium: Sóstói Stadion; Attendance: 600; Referee: (Hungary) Ádám Farkas |

| 10 August 2013 3 | Paks | 4–1 | Puskás | Paks, Tolna County |
| 19:00 CEST | Kovács 6'; Simon 59', 72', 88' | (Report) | Tischler 54' (pen.) | Stadium: Stadion PSE; Attendance: 1,200; Referee: (Hungary) Péter Solymosi |

| 18 August 2013 4 | Honvéd | 3–0 | Puskás | Budapest, Pest County |
| 16:30 CEST | Ignjatović 32'; Vernes 43'; Živanović 51' | (Report) | | Stadium: Bozsik Stadion; Attendance: 1,100; Referee: (Hungary) József Erdős |

| 24 August 2013 5 | Puskás | 1–0 | Kaposvár | Székesfehérvár, Fejér County |
| 19:00 CEST | Tischler 90' | (Report) | | Stadium: Sóstói Stadion; Attendance: 500; Referee: (Hungary) Tamás Bognár |

| 31 August 2013 6 | Mezőkövesd | 3–1 | Puskás | Mezőkövesd, Borsod-Abaúj-Zemplén County |
| 19:00 CEST | Petneházi 49'; Balajti 56'; Menougong 90+2' | (Report) | Lencse 62' | Stadium: Mezőkövesdi Városi Stadion; Attendance: 3,500; Referee: (Hungary) Zsolt Szabó |

| 14 September 2013 7 | Puskás | 0–2 | Diósgyőr | Székesfehérvár, Fejér County |
| 16:00 CEST | | (Report) | Futács 58'; Bacsa 88' | Stadium: Sóstói Stadion; Attendance: 300; Referee: (Hungary) Péter Solymosi |

| 21 September 2013 8 | Haladás | 2–1 | Puskás | Szombathely, Vas County |
| 16:00 CET | Halmosi 10'; Radó 72' (pen.) | (Report) | Lencse 56' | Stadium: Rohonci Street Stadium; Attendance: 2,840; Referee: (Hungary) Sándor Andó-Szabó |

| 28 September 2013 9 | Puskás | 3–1 | Ferencváros | Székesfehérvár, Fejér County |
| 16:00 CEST | Czvitkovics 16'; Lencse 58', 76' | (Report) | Vaszicsku 78' (o.g.) | Stadium: Sóstói Stadion; Attendance: 2,300; Referee: (Hungary) Ádám Németh |

| 5 October 2013 10 | Pécs | 1–2 | Puskás | Pécs, Baranya County |
| 16:00 CEST | Frőhlich 88' | (Report) | Lencse 4', 35' | Stadium: Stadion PMFC; Attendance: 1,200; Referee: (Hungary) József Erdős |

| 19 October 2013 11 | Videoton | 3–0 | Puskás | Székesfehérvár, Fejér County |
| 14:00 CEST | Zé Luís 66'; Petrolina 75'; Alvarez 90' | (Report) | | Stadium: Sóstói Stadion; Attendance: 3,020; Referee: (Hungary) Péter Solymosi |

| 27 October 2013 12 | Győr | 2–2 | Puskás | Győr, Győr-Moson-Sopron County |
| 18:30 CET | Andrić 5'; Kronaveter 39' | (Report) | Lencse 7'; Nikolić 75' | Stadium: ETO Park; Attendance: 2,600; Referee: (Hungary) Viktor Kassai |

| 2 November 2013 13 | Puskás | 1–1 | MTK | Székesfehérvár, Fejér County |
| 18:00 CET | Tischler 50' | (Report) | Varga 90+3' | Stadium: Sóstói Stadion; Attendance: 300; Referee: (Hungary) József Erdős |

| 9 November 2013 14 | Debrecen | 2–1 | Puskás | Debrecen, Hajdú-Bihar County |
| 14:00 CET | Szakály 10'; Volaš 28' (pen.) | (Report) | Tischler 24' | Stadium: Stadion Oláh Gábor Út; Attendance: 3,500; Referee: (Hungary) Ádám Németh |

| 22 November 2013 15 | Puskás | 2–2 | Kecskemét | Székesfehérvár, Fejér County |
| 19:00 CET | Haraszti 16'; Gallardo 46' | (Report) | Gréczi 75'; Barry 80' | Stadium: Sóstói Stadion; Attendance: 100; Referee: (Hungary) Péter Solymosi |

| 30 November 2013 16 | Puskás | 1–0 | Pápa | Székesfehérvár, Fejér County |
| 16:00 CET | Lencse 35' (pen.) | (Report) | | Stadium: Sóstói Stadion; Attendance: 100; Referee: (Hungary) Zsolt Szabó |

| 7 December 2013 17 | Újpest | 3–3 | Puskás | Budapest, Pest County |
| 14:00 CET | Lázár 60'; Litauszki 79'; Simon 88' | (Report) | Margitics 31'; Szekeres 63'; Lencse 67' (pen.) | Stadium: Szusza Ferenc Stadium; Attendance: 1,230; Referee: (Hungary) Péter Solymosi |

| 28 February 2014 18 | Puskás | 1–0 | Paks | Székesfehérvár, Fejér County |
| 19:00 CET | Tóth 80' | (Report) | | Stadium: Sóstói Stadion; Attendance: 330; Referee: (Hungary) József Erdős |

| 8 March 2014 19 | Puskás | 0–4 | Honvéd | Székesfehérvár, Fejér County |
| 16:00 CET | | (Report) | Vécsei 13'; Ignjatović 36'; Lovrić 59'; Prosser 77' | Stadium: Sóstói Stadion; Attendance: 600; Referee: (Hungary) Ádám Farkas |

| 16 March 2014 20 | Kaposvár | 1–1 | Puskás | Kaposvár, Somogy County |
| 16:30 CET | Kink 57' | (Report) | Lencse 32' | Stadium: Stadion Kaposvár Rákóczi; Attendance: 1,500; Referee: (Hungary) Péter Solymosi |

| 22 March 2014 21 | Puskás | 4–0 | Mezőkövesd | Székesfehérvár, Fejér County |
| 16:00 CET | Lencse 45', 67', 88' (pen.); Tischler 63' | (Report) | | Stadium: Sóstói Stadion; Attendance: 300; Referee: (Hungary) József Erdős |

| 29 March 2014 22 | Diósgyőr | 2–3 | Puskás | Miskolc, Borsod-Abaúj-Zemplén County |
| 14:00 CET | Gosztonyi 17' (pen.); Gohér 80' (pen.) | (Report) | Tischler 66', 88'; Lencse 77' (pen.) | Stadium: DVTK Stadion; Attendance: 4,477; Referee: (Hungary) Ádám Németh |

| 4 April 2014 23 | Puskás | 1–2 | Haladás | Székesfehérvár, Fejér County |
| 17:00 CEST | Czvitkovics 42' | (Report) | Guzmics 33'; Radó 43' | Stadium: Sóstói Stadion; Attendance: 200; Referee: (Hungary) István Vad |

| 12 April 2014 24 | Ferencváros | 1–0 | Puskás | Budapest, Pest County |
| 14:00 CEST | Mateos 65' (pen.) | (Report) | | Stadium: Ferenc Puskás Stadium; Attendance: 6,952; Referee: (Hungary) József Erdős |

| 18 April 2014 25 | Puskás | 1–1 | Pécs | Székesfehérvár, Fejér County |
| 19:00 CEST | Szakály 6' (pen.) | (Report) | Pölöskei 24' | Stadium: Sóstói Stadion; Attendance: 200; Referee: (Hungary) Ádám Farkas |

| 26 April 2014 26 | Puskás | 1–3 | Videoton | Felcsút, Fejér County |
| 14:00 CEST | Tischler 62' | (Report) | Nikolić 19' (pen.); Zé Luís 74'; Oliveira 78' | Stadium: Pancho Arena; Attendance: 3,633; Referee: (Hungary) Viktor Kassai |

| 3 May 2014 27 | Puskás | 0–1 | Győr | Felcsút, Fejér County |
| 20:00 CEST | | (Report) | Kalmár 58' | Stadium: Pancho Arena; Attendance: 3,623; Referee: (Hungary) Ádám Németh |

| 9 May 2014 28 | MTK | 2–1 | Puskás | Budapest, Pest County |
| 19:00 CEST | Szekeres 36' (o.g.); Horváth 46' | (Report) | Lencse 76' | Stadium: Hidegkuti Nándor Stadium; Attendance: 500; Referee: (Hungary) Péter Solymosi |

| 25 May 2014 29 | Puskás | 0–1 | Debrecen | Felcsút, Fejér County |
| 15:00 CEST | | (Report) | Bódi 66' | Stadium: Pancho Arena; Attendance: 2,127; Referee: (Hungary) Tamás Bognár |

| 31 May 2014 30 | Kecskemét | 1–2 | Puskás | Kecskemét, Bács-Kiskun County |
| 18:00 CEST | Balázs 15' | (Report) | Szakály 34', 83' | Stadium: Széktói Stadion; Attendance: 1,684; Referee: (Hungary) Ádám Farkas |

=== Classification ===
| Pos | Team | Pld | W | D | L | GF | GA | GD | Pts | Qualification or relegation |
|---|---|---|---|---|---|---|---|---|---|---|
| 12 | Pápa | 30 | 9 | 6 | 15 | 32 | 50 | −18 | 33 | |
| 13 | Újpest | 30 | 8 | 8 | 14 | 46 | 51 | −5 | 32 | |
| 14 | Puskás Akadémia | 30 | 8 | 7 | 15 | 36 | 51 | −15 | 31 | |
| 15 | Mezőkövesd (R) | 30 | 6 | 6 | 18 | 27 | 52 | −25 | 24 | Relegation to Nemzeti Bajnokság II |
| 16 | Kaposvár (R) | 30 | 4 | 7 | 19 | 21 | 54 | −33 | 19 | Relegation to Nemzeti Bajnokság II |

Source: mlsz.hu (in Hungarian)
Rules for classification: 1st points; 2nd overall wins; 3rd goal difference; 4th head-to-head points; 5th head-to-head goal difference; 6th head-to-head away goals scored; 7th fair-play points; 8th drawing of lots
(R) Relegated

=== Results summary ===
| Overall | | | | | | | | Home | | | | | | Away | | | | | |
| Pld | W | D | L | GF | GA | GD | Pts | W | D | L | GF | GA | GD | W | D | L | GF | GA | GD |
|---|---|---|---|---|---|---|---|---|---|---|---|---|---|---|---|---|---|---|---|
| 30 | 8 | 7 | 15 | 36 | 51 | −15 | 31 | 5 | 3 | 6 | 16 | 18 | −2 | 3 | 4 | 9 | 20 | 33 | −13 |

Last updated: 1 June 2014.
Source: NB1

=== Results by round ===
| Round | 1 | 2 | 3 | 4 | 5 | 6 | 7 | 8 | 9 | 10 | 11 | 12 | 13 | 14 | 15 | 16 | 17 | 18 | 19 | 20 | 21 | 22 | 23 | 24 | 25 | 26 | 27 | 28 | 29 | 30 |
|---|---|---|---|---|---|---|---|---|---|---|---|---|---|---|---|---|---|---|---|---|---|---|---|---|---|---|---|---|---|---|
| Ground | A | H | A | A | H | A | H | A | H | A | A | A | H | A | H | H | A | H | H | A | H | A | H | A | H | H | H | A | H | A |
| Result | D | L | L | L | W | L | L | L | W | W | L | D | D | L | D | W | D | W | L | D | W | W | L | L | D | L | L | L | L | W |
| Position | 10 | 11 | 14 | 15 | 13 | 15 | 15 | 15 | 15 | 12 | 13 | 14 | 14 | 14 | 15 | 14 | 14 | 12 | 12 | 12 | 12 | 10 | 12 | 12 | 12 | 13 | 13 | 14 | 14 | 14 |

Updated to match(es) played on 1 June 2014. Source: Matches
A = Away; H = Home; W = Win; D = Draw; L = Loss

== Magyar Kupa ==
| 28 August 2013 Round 2 | Andráshida | 2–3 | Puskás | Zalaegerszeg, Zala County |
| 16:30 CEST | Tóth 90+1'; Polareczki 90+2' | (Report) | Lencse 10'; Czvitkovics 23'; Haraszti 67' | Stadium: Andráshida LSC Sporttelep; Attendance: 500; Referee: (Hungary) Ádám Radványi |

| 25 September 2013 Round 3 | Sopron | 2–3 | Puskás | Sopron, Győr-Moson-Sopron County |
| 18:00 CEST | Baranyai 11'; Szabó 67' | (Report) | Lencse 28', 96'; Zsolnai 65' | Stadium: Stadion Városi; Attendance: 500; Referee: (Hungary) Csaba Pintér |

| 22 October 2013 Round of 32 | Puskás | 0–0 (a.e.t.) (3–4 p) | Kecskemét | Székesfehérvár, Fejér County |
| 13:30 CEST | | (Report) | | Stadium: Sóstói Stadion; Attendance: 80; Referee: (Hungary) Gábor Oláh |
| | Penalties |
| | (penalty scored) Nikolić; (penalty missed) Haraszti; (penalty scored) Szekeres; (penalty scored) Czvitkovics; (penalty missed) Tischler | | (penalty scored) Pekár; (penalty scored) Gyagya; (penalty scored) Balázs; (penalty scored) Vukasović; (penalty missed) Savić |

== Ligakupa ==
=== Group stage ===
| 4 September 2013 1 | Cegléd | 2–2 | Puskás | Cegléd, Pest County |
| 16:30 CEST | Koncz 13'; Medgyesi 77' | (Report) | Zsolnai 44' (pen.); Baracskai 49' | Stadium: Stadion Malomtó széli Attendance: 400; Referee: (Hungary) László Varga |

| 11 September 2013 2 | Puskás | 4–2 | Szigetszentmiklós | Felcsút, Fejér County |
| 16:30 CEST | Baracskai 4'; Molnár 51'; Zsolnai 61', 81' | (Report) | Bonifert 68'; Takács 71' | Stadium: Felcsúti Sportkomplexum; Attendance: 150; Referee: (Hungary) Szabolcs Szilasi |

| 9 October 2013 3 | Honvéd | 0–0 | Puskás | Budapest, Pest County |
| 19:00 CEST | | (Report) | | Stadium: Bozsik Stadion; Attendance: 200; Referee: (Hungary) Roland Veizer |

| 16 October 2013 4 | Puskás | 2–0 | Honvéd | Felcsút, Fejér County |
| 14:30 CEST | Haraszti 30'; Lencse 54' | (Report) | | Stadium: Felcsúti Sportkomplexum; Attendance: 100; Referee: (Hungary) Balázs Böcskei |

| 13 November 2013 5 | Szigetszentmiklós | 1–0 | Puskás | Szigetszentmiklós, Pest County |
| 13:30 CET | Kollega 55' | (Report) | | Stadium: Stadium Sport Street; Attendance: 100; Referee: (Hungary) Norbert Kiss |

| 19 November 2013 6 | Puskás | 3–0 | Cegléd | Felcsút, Fejér County |
| 13:00 CET | Lencse 37'; Wagué 54'; Czvitkovics 71' | (Report) | | Stadium: Felcsúti Sportkomplexum; Attendance: 50; Referee: (Hungary) Szabolcs Szilasi |

==== Classification ====
| Pos | Team | Pld | W | D | L | GF | GA | GD | Pts | Qualification |
|---|---|---|---|---|---|---|---|---|---|---|
| 1 | Puskás | 6 | 3 | 2 | 1 | 11 | 5 | +6 | 11 | Advance to knockout phase |
| 2 | Szigetszentmiklós | 6 | 3 | 1 | 2 | 9 | 6 | +3 | 10 | Advance to knockout phase |
| 3 | Cegléd | 6 | 2 | 2 | 2 | 8 | 11 | −3 | 8 | |
| 4 | Budapest Honvéd | 6 | 1 | 1 | 4 | 5 | 11 | −6 | 4 | |

Rules for classification: 1) points; 2) goal difference; 3) number of goals scored.

=== Knockout phase ===
| 25 February 2014 Round of 16 (1st leg) | Vasas | 0–3 | Puskás | Budapest, Pest County |
| 16:00 CET | Berecz 24'; Remili 78' | (Report) | | Stadium: Stadion Rudolf Illovszky; Attendance: 500; Referee: (Hungary) Ádám Radványi |

| 4 March 2014 Round of 16 (2nd leg) | Puskás | 3–1 (6–1 agg.) | Vasas | Felcsút, Fejér County |
| 13:30 CET | Tischler 43'; Denković 61'; Vaszicsku 79' | (Report) | Remili 27' | Stadium: Felcsúti Sportkomplexum; Attendance: 200; Referee: (Hungary) Gergely Szőts |

| 18 March 2014 Quarter-final (1st leg) | Debrecen | 3–0 | Puskás | Debrecen, Hajdú-Bihar County |
| 17:00 CET | Tisza 26' | (Report) | Lencse 50' | Stadium: Stadion Oláh Gábor Út; Attendance: 1,200; Referee: (Hungary) István Vad |

| 1 April 2014 Quarter-final (2nd leg) | Puskás | 3–2 (3–5 agg.) | Debrecen | Felcsút, Fejér County |
| 15:00 CEST | Tóth 36'; Németh 83'; Oldal 89' | (Report) | Volaš 5', 6' | Stadium: Felcsúti Sportkomplexum; Attendance: on closed Referee: (Hungary) József Erdős |

== Pre-season ==
| 3 July 2013 1 | Puskás FC (Hungary) | 2–0 | (Croatia) NK Osijek | Felcsút, Fejér County |
| CEST | Gajdos; Tepurić | (Report) |

| 6 July 2013 2 | Gyirmót SE (Hungary) | 1–0 | (Hungary) Puskás FC | Győr, Győr-Moson-Sopron County |
| CEST | Kelemen | (Report) | | Stadium: Stadium Ménfő Street; Attendance: 200; Referee: (Hungary) Gábor Péter |

| 9 July 2013 3 | Puskás FC (Hungary) | 1–0 | (Russia) FC Rubin-2 Kazan | Bük, Vas County |
| CEST | Zsolnai | (Report) |

| 10 July 2013 4 | SC Ritzing (Austria) | 0–3 | (Hungary) Puskás FC | Olbendorf, Austria |
| CEST | | (Report) | Molnár; Károly; Barcsay | Referee: (Austria) Paukovits |

| 13 July 2013 5 | Puskás FC (Hungary) | 3–2 | (Romania) AFC Săgeata Năvodari | Wien, Austria |
| 10:35 CEST | Zsolnai pen.' Gajdos; Szakály | (Report) | | Stadium: Sportplatz Wien; Referee: (Austria) Helmut Hofer |

| 17 July 2013 6 | Puskás FC (Hungary) | 2–1 | (Hungary) Kozármisleny SE | Felcsút, Fejér County |
| CEST | Tóth; Apostolopoulos | (Report) | Papp 63' |

| 22 July 2013 7 | Puskás FC (Hungary) | 0–3 | (England) West Bromwich Albion F.C. | Sopron, Győr-Moson-Sopron County |
| CEST | | (Report) | Anelka 9', 26'; Dorrans 80' (pen.) | Stadium: Stadion Városi; Attendance: 3,000 |
