= 2015–16 Puskás Akadémia FC season =

Puskás Akadémia
2015–16 season
- Owner: Felcsúti Utánpótlás Neveléséért Alapítvány
- Manager: Robert Jarni (until 16 April); István Szijjártó (from 16 April)
- Stadium: Pancho Aréna
- Nemzeti Bajnokság I: 11th (relegated)
- Magyar Kupa: Round of 64
- Top goalscorer: League: László Pekár (7); All: László Pekár (7)
- Highest home attendance: 3,613 (vs Budapest Honvéd, 30 April 206)
- Lowest home attendance: 708 (vs Paks, 9 March 2016)
Home colours	Away colours

The 2015–16 season was Puskás Akadémia Football Club's 4th competitive season, 3rd consecutive season in the Nemzeti Bajnokság I and 5th year in existence as a football club. In addition to the domestic league, Puskás Akadémia participated in this season's editions of the Magyar Kupa.

Robert Jarni took over the team from Miklós Benczés, whose contract was terminated at the end of the previous season. On April 16, Jarni got sacked after the defeat against Békéscsaba on round 30 and got replaced by István Szijjártó.

== First team squad ==
The players listed had league appearances and stayed until the end of the season.

Note: Flags indicate national team as defined under FIFA eligibility rules; some limited exceptions apply. Players may hold more than one non-FIFA nationality.

No.	Pos.	Nation	Player
1	GK	HUN	Krisztián Pogacsics
3	DF	CRO	Renato Kelić
4	DF	HUN	Ádám Lipcsei
5	DF	HUN	Ferenc Fodor
7	MF	UKR	Dmytro Lyopa
8	MF	CRO	Stipe Bačelić-Grgić
10	FW	HUN	Roland Sallai
11	FW	SVK	Karol Mészáros
14	DF	HUN	Gyula Forró
15	GK	SRB	Filip Pajović
17	MF	HUN	László Zsidai
18	MF	HUN	Attila Polonkai (captain)

No.	Pos.	Nation	Player
20	FW	UKR	Vyacheslav Churko
22	DF	HUN	Zsolt Tar
23	MF	CRO	Marko Dinjar
24	DF	HUN	Attila Fiola
25	MF	HUN	Zsolt Nagy
27	FW	HUN	Donát Zsótér
49	DF	SRB	Branko Pauljević
50	FW	HUN	Bence Péter
64	DF	HUN	Gergő Kocsis
77	FW	HUN	László Pekár
88	MF	HUN	Dávid Márkvárt
91	FW	NED	Geoffrey Castillion

== Transfers ==
=== Transfers in ===
Transfer window	Pos.	No.	Player	From
Summer	GK	1	(Hungary) Krisztián Pogacsics	Free agent (Note: Previous club: Győr.)
Summer	DF	5	(Hungary) Ferenc Fodor	Nyíregyháza
Summer	MF	6	(Hungary) Bence Pintér	Youth team
Summer	MF	8	(Croatia) Stipe Bačelić-Grgić	(Belgium) Cercle Brugge
Summer	MF	23	(Croatia) Marko Dinjar	Free agent (Note: Previous club: Győr.)
Summer	MF	28	(Hungary) Dávid Mészáros	Youth team
Summer	DF	39	(Croatia) Ivan Herceg	(Israel) Maccabi Petah Tikva
Summer	GK	47	(Hungary) Ádám Zima	Youth team
Summer	DF	49	(Serbia) Branko Pauljević	Free agent (Note: Previous club: Pécs.)
Summer	DF	64	(Hungary) Gergő Kocsis	Videoton
Summer	FW	77	(Hungary) László Pekár	Nyíregyháza
Summer	MF	88	(Hungary) Dávid Márkvárt	Pécs
Winter	GK	—	(Hungary) Balázs Tóth	Youth team
Winter	DF	4	(Hungary) Ádám Lipcsei	Youth team
Winter	MF	7	(Ukraine) Dmytro Lyopa	(Ukraine) Metalist Kharkiv
Winter	FW	11	(Slovakia) Karol Mészáros	(Slovakia) Slovan Bratislava
Winter	DF	14	(Hungary) Gyula Forró	Újpest
Winter	FW	50	(Hungary) Bence Péter	Youth team
Winter	MF	17	(Hungary) László Zsidai	Debrecen
Winter	MF	53	(Hungary) András Erdei	Youth team

=== Transfers out ===
Transfer window	Pos.	No.	Player	To
Summer	MF	—	(Hungary) Márk Barcsay	Cigánd
Summer	GK	1	(Hungary) László Mikola	Vecsés
Summer	DF	2	(Brazil) Fábio Guarú	Békéscsaba
Summer	DF	4	(Hungary) Márk Tamás	Released (Note: Joined Diósgyőr.)
Summer	DF	5	(Hungary) Zoltán Szélesi	Retired
Summer	MF	13	(Hungary) Andor Margitics	Budafok
Summer	MF	19	(Hungary) Zsolt Gajdos	Szolnok
Summer	MF	20	(Hungary) Bálint Károly	Sopron
Summer	GK	21	(Slovakia) Ľuboš Hajdúch	Released (Note: Joined Skalica.)
Summer	DF	24	(Hungary) Csaba Vachtler	Released (Note: Joined Balmazújváros.)
Summer	DF	42	(Hungary) Márton Lorentz	Dunaújváros (Note: Moved from Puskás Akadémia loan to Dunaújváros loan as a Videoton player.)
Summer	MF	88	(Hungary) Dénes Szakály	Paks
Winter	DF	39	(Croatia) Ivan Herceg	(South Korea) Gyeongnam

=== Loans in ===
Transfer window	Pos.	No.	Player	From	End date
Summer	GK	31	(Hungary) Tamás Horváth	Videoton	January 2016
Summer	FW	27	(Hungary) Donát Zsótér	Videoton	End of season
Winter	GK	15	(Serbia) Filip Pajović	Videoton	End of season
Winter	FW	20	(Ukraine) Vyacheslav Churko	(Ukraine) Shakhtar Donetsk	End of season
Winter	FW	91	(Netherlands) Geoffrey Castillion	Debrecen	End of season

=== Loans out ===
Transfer window	Pos.	No.	Player	To	End date
Summer	FW	35	(Hungary) Tibor Molnár	Csákvár	End of season
Summer	GK	44	(Serbia) Branislav Danilović	Videoton	End of season
Summer	MF	53	(Hungary) Tibor Oldal	Csákvár	End of season
Summer	MF	70	(Hungary) László Tóth	Mezőkövesd	End of season
Summer	DF	88	(Hungary) Szabolcs Fényes	Csákvár	End of season
Summer	DF	91	(Hungary) Gergő Vaszicsku	Csákvár	January 2016
Winter	MF	6	(Hungary) Bence Pintér	Csákvár	End of season
Winter	MF	7	(Hungary) Martin Hudák	Békéscsaba	End of season
Winter	FW	9	(Hungary) Patrik Tischler	Videoton	End of season
Winter	DF	23	(Hungary) Csaba Spandler	Csákvár	End of season
Winter	FW	29	(Hungary) László Lencse	Újpest	End of season
Winter	GK	47	(Hungary) Ádám Zima	Budafok	End of season

== Competitions ==
=== Overview ===
Competition	First match	Last match	Starting round	Final position	Record							
Competition	First match	Last match	Starting round	Final position	Pld	W	D	L	GF	GA	GD	Win %
Nemzeti Bajnokság I	18 July 2015	30 April 2016	Matchday 1	11th	33	7	10	16	35	51	−16	21.21
Magyar Kupa	12 August 2015	22 September 2015	Round of 128	Round of 64	2	1	0	1	5	2	+3	50.00
Total					35	8	10	17	40	53	−13	22.86

Source: Competitions

=== Nemzeti Bajnokság I ===
==== League table ====
Pos	Team	Pld	W	D	L	GF	GA	GD	Pts	Qualification or relegation
8	Honvéd	33	12	7	14	40	39	+1	43	
9	Diósgyőr	33	10	8	15	37	47	−10	38	
10	Vasas	33	9	5	19	32	54	−22	32	
11	Puskás Akadémia (R)	33	7	10	16	35	51	−16	31	Relegation to the Nemzeti Bajnokság II
12	Békéscsaba (R)	33	6	9	18	25	55	−30	27	Relegation to the Nemzeti Bajnokság II

Source: Soccerway
Rules for classification: 1) Points; 2) Matches won; 3) Goal difference; 4) Goals scored; 5) Head-to-head points; 6) Head-to-head goal difference; 7) Head-to-head away goals scored; 8) Fairplay; 9) Draw.
(R) Relegated

==== Results summary ====
Overall								Home						Away					
Pld	W	D	L	GF	GA	GD	Pts	W	D	L	GF	GA	GD	W	D	L	GF	GA	GD
33	7	10	16	35	51	−16	31	5	6	5	14	16	−2	2	4	11	21	35	−14

Source: Hungarian Football Federation

==== Results by round ====
Round	1	2	3	4	5	6	7	8	9	10	11	12	13	14	15	16	17	18	19	20	21	22	23	24	25	26	27	28	29	30	31	32	33
Ground	A	A	H	A	H	H	A	H	A	H	A	H	H	A	H	A	A	H	H	H	A	H	A	H	A	H	A	H	A	H	A	A	H
Result	L	D	W	D	L	W	D	D	L	D	L	L	D	L	D	L	W	L	L	W	L	L	L	W	L	D	D	D	L	L	W	L	W
Position	10	9	7	8	9	7	6	8	9	9	10	10	10	10	11	11	10	10	11	10	11	11	11	10	10	10	10	11	11	12	10	11	11

Source: Matches
A = Away; H = Home; W = Win; D = Draw; L = Loss

==== Matches ====
18 July 2015 1	MTK Budapest	1–0	Puskás Akadémia	Budapest
18:00 CEST (UTC+2)	Torghelle 28', (yellow card) 90+3'; Varga (yellow card) 63'; Střeštík (yellow card) 67'	Report	Fiola (yellow card) 84'	Stadium: Stadion Rudolf Illovszky; Attendance: 800; Referee: Sándor Andó-Szabó

26 July 2015 2	Debrecen	1–1	Puskás Akadémia	Debrecen
18:00 CEST (UTC+2)	Castillion 30'; Morozov (yellow card) 63'	Report	Pekár 56'; Fiola (yellow card) 73'	Stadium: Nagyerdei Stadion; Attendance: 3,245; Referee: Tamás Bognár

1 August 2015 3	Puskás Akadémia	1–0	Paks	Felcsút
18:00 CEST (UTC+2)	Pekár 40'; Sallai (yellow card) 77'	Report	Kecskés (yellow card) 51'	Stadium: Pancho Aréna; Attendance: 1,261; Referee: Péter Solymosi

8 August 2015 4	Újpest	2–2	Puskás Akadémia	Budapest
18:00 CEST (UTC+2)	Perović 36'; Sanković (yellow card) 54'; Suljić (yellow card) 57'; Litauszki (yellow card) 68'; Bardhi 90+2'	Report	Sallai 45'; Heris 45+3' (o.g.); Hudák (yellow card) 88'	Stadium: Ferenc Szusza Stadium; Attendance: 3,060; Referee: Csaba Pintér

15 August 2015 5	Puskás Akadémia	1–2	Békéscsaba	Felcsút
18:00 CEST (UTC+2)	Márkvárt 12'; Tischler (yellow card) 89'; Fodor (yellow card) 90+2'	Report	Calvente (yellow card) 11'; Laczkó (yellow card) 39'; Szilágyi 53'; Pekár 57' (o.g.)	Stadium: Pancho Aréna; Attendance: 941; Referee: Ádám Németh

22 August 2015 6	Puskás Akadémia	1–0	Vasas	Felcsút
18:00 CEST (UTC+2)	Fodor (yellow card) 32'; Pauljević (yellow card) 82'; Pekár 85'	Report	Lázok (yellow card) 51'; Adamović (yellow card) 65'; Remili (yellow card) 90'	Stadium: Pancho Aréna; Attendance: 2,081; Referee: Tamás Bognár

29 August 2015 7	Budapest Honvéd	0–0	Puskás Akadémia	Budapest
18:00 CEST (UTC+2)	Bobál (yellow card) 17'; Holender (yellow card) 33'; Botka (yellow card) 39'; Kamber (yellow card) 61'; Lovrić (yellow card) 85'	Report	Fodor (yellow card) 25'; Márkvárt (yellow card) 45'; Sallai (yellow card) 90+5'	Stadium: Bozsik József Stadion; Attendance: 2,800; Referee: Viktor Kassai

12 September 2015 8	Puskás Akadémia	1–1	Haladás	Felcsút
18:00 CEST (UTC+2)	Dinjar (yellow card) 44'; Tischler (yellow card) 45'; Bačelić-Grgić (yellow card) 46'; Pekár 61'; Sallai (yellow card) 75'	Report	Németh 28', (yellow card) 34'; Popin (yellow card) 35'; Iszlai (red card) 48'; Király (yellow card) 68'; T. Wils (yellow card) 74'	Stadium: Pancho Aréna; Attendance: 800; Referee: István Vad

19 September 2015 9	Diósgyőr	3–2	Puskás Akadémia	Miskolc
18:00 CEST (UTC+2)	Okuka 46'; Novothny 66'; Egerszegi 90+2'	Report	Pekár 81'; Zsótér 86'	Stadium: Diósgyőri Stadion; Attendance: 3,071; Referee: Viktor Kassai

26 September 2015 10	Puskás Akadémia	0–0	Ferencváros	Felcsút
18:00 CEST (UTC+2)	Fiola (yellow card) 70'	Report	Z. Gera (yellow card) 78'	Stadium: Pancho Aréna; Attendance: 3,300; Referee: Sándor Andó-Szabó

3 October 2015 11	Videoton	3–2	Puskás Akadémia	Székesfehérvár
18:00 CEST (UTC+2)	Pölöskei (yellow card) 10'; Gyurcsó 34', 79'; Suljić 50'; Pátkai (yellow card) 52'; Stopira (yellow card) 65'	Report	Lencse 6'; Pekár 22'; Bačelić-Grgić (yellow card) 58'; Márkvárt (yellow card) 69'; Fiola (red card) 84'	Stadium: Sóstói Stadion; Attendance: 1,745; Referee: József Erdős

17 October 2015 12	Puskás Akadémia	2–3	MTK Budapest	Felcsút
18:00 CEST (UTC+2)	Lencse 17' (pen.); Bačelić-Grgić (yellow card) 20'; Herceg (yellow card) 62'; Fodor 77'; Márkvárt (yellow card) 79'	Report	Vadnai (yellow card) 16'; Kanta 32', 86' (pen.), (yellow card) 78'; Torghelle (yellow card) 35'; Bese 53'	Stadium: Pancho Aréna; Attendance: 1,486; Referee: Csaba Pintér

24 October 2015 13	Puskás Akadémia	1–1	Debrecen	Felcsút
15:30 CEST (UTC+2)	Pauljević (yellow card) 6'; Fiola (yellow card) 63'; Lencse 81'; Kocsis (yellow card) 90+3'	Report	Máté (yellow card) 38'; N. Balogh (yellow card) 64'; Sidibe (yellow card) 65'; Korhut 87'	Stadium: Pancho Aréna; Attendance: 1,513; Referee: Sándor Andó-Szabó

31 October 2015 14	Paks	4–2	Puskás Akadémia	Paks
15:30 CET (UTC+1)	Papp (yellow card) 21', (goal) 23', 67'; Hahn (yellow card) 25', (goal) 90+1'; Gévay (yellow card) 25'; Bačelić-Grgić 84' (o.g.)	Report	Márkvárt 27', (yellow card) 41'; Dinjar (yellow card) 72'; Tischler 80'; Herceg (yellow card) 83'	Stadium: Fehérvári úti Stadion; Attendance: 1,186; Referee: Ferenc Karakó

21 November 2015 16	Békéscsaba	2–1	Puskás Akadémia	Békéscsaba
15:30 CET (UTC+1)	Laczkó 8', (yellow card) 87'; Damjanović (yellow card) 43', (goal) 53'	Report	Pauljević 6'; Herceg (yellow card) 36'; Bačelić-Grgić (yellow card) 42'	Stadium: Stadion Kórház utcai Attendance: 632; Referee: Ádám Németh

28 November 2015 17	Vasas	2–4	Puskás Akadémia	Budapest
15:30 CET (UTC+1)	Ádám 23', (yellow card) 44'; Vukasović (yellow card) 39'; Debreceni (yellow card) 53'; Preklet (yellow card) 56'; Remili (red card) 73'; Czvitkovics 74'	Report	Pekár (yellow card) 19'; Debreceni 34' (o.g.); Bačelić-Grgić 36'; Tischler 40', 85'	Stadium: Stadion Rudolf Illovszky; Attendance: 950; Referee: István Vad

1 December 2015 15	Puskás Akadémia	1–1	Újpest	Felcsút
18:00 CET (UTC+1)	Lencse (yellow card) 25'; Nagy 67'	Report	Diagne (yellow card) 82', (goal) 90+3'	Stadium: Pancho Aréna; Attendance: 1,302; Referee: Sándor Andó-Szabó
Note: The matches of the 15th round were originally scheduled for 7 November 2015, but was postponed due to HFF decision.

5 December 2015 18	Puskás Akadémia	0–3	Budapest Honvéd	Felcsút
15:30 CET (UTC+1)	Nagy (yellow card) 11'; Lencse (yellow card) 19'; Tischler (yellow card) 21'; Kelić (yellow card) 51'	Report	Ikenne (yellow card) 12'; Prosser 27'; Youla 35'; Ignjatović (yellow card) 54'; Kamber 90+4'	Stadium: Pancho Aréna; Attendance: 913; Referee: Ferenc Karakó

12 December 2015 19	Haladás	2–1	Puskás Akadémia	Szombathely
15:30 CET (UTC+1)	Németh 24'; Jagodics (yellow card) 31'; Halmosi 49'; Király (yellow card) 80'	Report	Tischler (yellow card) 37'; Lencse 41'; Tar (yellow card) 47'	Stadium: Rohonci Street Stadium; Attendance: 4,280; Referee: Szabolcs Szilasi

13 February 2016 20	Puskás Akadémia	1–0	Diósgyőr	Felcsút
15:30 CET (UTC+1)	Pekár 3' (pen.); Lyopa (yellow card) 7'	Report	Barczi (yellow card) 36'; Lipták (yellow card) 90+2'	Stadium: Pancho Aréna; Attendance: 1,627; Referee: István Vad

20 February 2016 21	Ferencváros	2–0	Puskás Akadémia	Budapest
15:30 CET (UTC+1)	Ramírez 63'; Böde 66'; Leandro (red card) 84'	Report	Zsidai (yellow card) 9'; Fiola (yellow card) 28'; Lyopa (yellow card) 30'; Márkvárt (yellow card) 53'	Stadium: Groupama Arena; Attendance: 6,124; Referee: Ádám Farkas

27 February 2016 22	Puskás Akadémia	0–1	Videoton	Felcsút
15:30 CET (UTC+1)	Bačelić-Grgić (yellow card) 38'; Polonkai (yellow card) 52'; Pauljević (red card) 76'; Sallai (yellow card) 87'	Report	Rudolf (yellow card) 18'; Kovács (yellow card) 63'; Haraszti (yellow card) 86'; Feczesin 90+4'	Stadium: Pancho Aréna; Attendance: 1,756; Referee: Zoltán Iványi

5 March 2016 23	Debrecen	4–2	Puskás Akadémia	Debrecen
18:00 CET (UTC+1)	Takács 12'; Szakály 19', (yellow card) 49'; Horváth 20', 54', (yellow card) 54'; Korhut (yellow card) 45'	Report	Churko 8'; Mészáros 24'; Lyopa (yellow card) 47'	Stadium: Nagyerdei Stadion; Attendance: 2,311; Referee: József Erdős

9 March 2016 24	Puskás Akadémia	2–1	Paks	Felcsút
16:00 CET (UTC+1)	Churko 54', (yellow card) 90'; Zsidai (yellow card) 61'; Mészáros 65'; Lyopa (red card) 90+2'	Report	Kecskés (yellow card) 37'; Gévay (yellow card) 61'; Lenzsér (yellow card) 69'; Hahn 84'	Stadium: Pancho Aréna; Attendance: 708; Referee: Ferenc Karakó

12 March 2016 25	Ferencváros	4–0	Puskás Akadémia	Budapest
18:00 CET (UTC+1)	Pintér (yellow card) 40'; Čukić (yellow card) 59'; Lamah 68' (pen.); Böde 70', 85' (pen.); Radó 90'	Report	Churko (yellow card) 55'; Forró (yellow card) 77'; Lipcsei (yellow card) 84'	Stadium: Groupama Arena; Attendance: 4,858; Referee: Tamás Bognár

19 March 2016 26	Puskás Akadémia	0–0	Videoton	Felcsút
15:30 CET (UTC+1)	Zsidai (yellow card) 31'; Márkvárt (yellow card) 82'; Mészáros (yellow card) 90+4'	Report	Simon (yellow card) 26'; Oliveira (yellow card) 32'; Pátkai (yellow card) 65'	Stadium: Pancho Aréna; Attendance: 1,718; Referee: Péter Solymosi

2 April 2016 28	Puskás Akadémia	1–1	Haladás	Felcsút
18:30 CEST (UTC+2)	Márkvárt 13'; Mészáros (yellow card) 28'; Fiola (yellow card) 40'; Pauljević (yellow card) 71'	Report	Gaál 34'; Kovács (yellow card) 78'; Halmosi (yellow card) 90'; T. Wils (yellow card) 90+1'; Williams (yellow card) 90+2'	Stadium: Pancho Aréna; Attendance: 956; Referee: Viktor Kassai

6 April 2016 29	Diósgyőr	2–1	Puskás Akadémia	Miskolc
19:00 CEST (UTC+2)	Barczi (yellow card) 33'; Koman 38' (pen.), (yellow card) 80'; Elek 40'; Tamás (yellow card) 72'	Report	Mészáros 45'; Kelić (yellow card) 85'	Stadium: Diósgyőri Stadion; Attendance: 3,085; Referee: Ádám Németh

9 April 2016 27	Újpest	2–2	Puskás Akadémia	Budapest
18:00 CEST (UTC+2)	Diarra (yellow card) 8'; Sanković (yellow card) 39'; Angelov (yellow card) 47'; Kecskés (yellow card) 55'; Balogh 58'; Kabát 90+2'	Report	Fiola 6', (yellow card) 45'; Márkvárt (yellow card) 60'; Churko 81'; Zsótér (yellow card) 90+6'	Stadium: Ferenc Szusza Stadium; Attendance: 2,014; Referee: József Erdős
Note: The matches of the 27th round were originally scheduled for 30 March 2016, but were postponed to ease the pressure on the tight schedule.

16 April 2016 30	Puskás Akadémia	0–1	Békéscsaba	Felcsút
18:00 CEST (UTC+2)	Lyopa (yellow card) 53'; Fiola (yellow card) 68'; Castillion (red card) 90+3'	Report	Vaskó 4'; Guarú (yellow card) 43'; Punoševac (yellow card) 66'; Calvente (yellow card) 82'	Stadium: Pancho Aréna; Attendance: 1,327; Referee: Péter Solymosi

20 April 2016 31	MTK Budapest	0–1	Puskás Akadémia	Dunaújváros
19:00 CEST (UTC+2)	Hajdú (yellow card) 26'; Kanta (yellow card) 50'; Torghelle (yellow card) 71'; Baki (yellow card) 90+3'	Report	Zsótér 32'; Zsidai (yellow card) 50'	Stadium: Dunaújvárosi Stadion; Attendance: 521; Referee: István Vad

23 April 2016 32	Vasas	1–0	Puskás Akadémia	Budapest
18:00 CEST (UTC+2)	Korcsmár 6'; Szivacski (yellow card) 23'; Remili (yellow card) 24'	Report	Pekár (yellow card) 25'; Polonkai (yellow card) 90+2'	Stadium: Stadion Rudolf Illovszky; Attendance: 3,350; Referee: Ádám Farkas

30 April 2016 33	Puskás Akadémia	2–1	Budapest Honvéd	Felcsút
16:30 CEST (UTC+2)	Bačelić-Grgić 20'; Tar 31'; Sallai (yellow card) 81'; Pogacsics (yellow card) 83'	Report	Ikenne (yellow card) 73'; Bobál 90+2'	Stadium: Pancho Aréna; Attendance: 3,613; Referee: Zoltán Iványi

=== Magyar Kupa ===
12 August 2015 Round of 128	Sárrétudvari	0–5	Puskás Akadémia	Püspökladány
17:00 CEST (UTC+2)		Report	Balogh 3' (o.g.); Lencse 19'; Tischler 53'; Péter 81', 90+2'	Stadium: Gellér Sándor Sportcentrum; Referee: Róbert Nagy

22 September 2015 Round of 64	Kozármisleny	2–0	Puskás Akadémia	Kozármisleny
15:00 CEST (UTC+2)	Wittrédi (yellow card) 62'; M. Nagy 66'; E. Nagy (yellow card) 67'; Fellai (yellow card) 71'; Kocsis 90'; D. Tóth (yellow card) 90+4'	Report	Hudák (yellow card) 45'; Márkvárt (yellow card) 65'; Tar (yellow card) 87'; Lencse (yellow card) 90+3'	Stadium: Kozármislenyi Stadion; Attendance: 400; Referee: Gergely Szőts

== Statistics ==
=== Overall ===
Appearances (Apps) numbers are for appearances in competitive games only, including sub appearances.
Source: Competitions

No.	Player	Pos.	Nemzeti Bajnokság I				Magyar Kupa				Total			
No.	Player	Pos.	Apps	Goal	Booked	Sent off (straight red)	Apps	Goal	Booked	Sent off (straight red)	Apps	Goal	Booked	Sent off (straight red)
1	(Hungary) Krisztián Pogacsics	GK	27		1						27		1	
3	(Croatia) Renato Kelić	DF	25		2		1				26		2	
4	(Hungary) Ádám Lipcsei	DF	4		1						4		1	
5	(Hungary) Ferenc Fodor	DF	20	1	3						20	1	3	
6	(Hungary) Bence Pintér	MF	8				1				9			
7	(Hungary) Martin Hudák	MF	8		1		2		1		10		2	
7	(Ukraine) Dmytro Lyopa	MF	6		4	1					6		4	1
8	(Croatia) Stipe Bačelić-Grgić	MF	24	2	5		1				25	2	5	
9	(Hungary) Patrik Tischler	FW	18	3	4		2	1			20	4	4	
10	(Hungary) Roland Sallai	FW	31	1	5		1				32	1	5	
11	(Slovakia) Karol Mészáros	FW	14	3	2						14	3	2	
14	(Hungary) Gyula Forró	DF	11		1						11		1	
15	(Serbia) Filip Pajović	GK	5								5			
15	(Hungary) Renátó Boros	GK												
17	(Hungary) László Zsidai	MF	12		4						12		4	
18	(Hungary) Attila Polonkai	MF	12		2						12		2	
20	(Ukraine) Vyacheslav Churko	FW	12	3	2						12	3	2	
22	(Hungary) Zsolt Tar	DF	9	1	1		2		1		11	1	2	
23	(Hungary) Csaba Spandler	DF												
23	(Croatia) Marko Dinjar	MF	16		2						16		2	
24	(Hungary) Attila Fiola	DF	25	1	8	1					25	1	8	1
25	(Hungary) Zsolt Nagy	MF	18	1	1		2				20	1	1	
27	(Hungary) Donát Zsótér	FW	17	2	1		1				18	2	1	
28	(Hungary) Dávid Mészáros	MF					1				1			
29	(Hungary) László Lencse	FW	17	4	2		2	1	1		19	5	3	
31	(Hungary) Tamás Horváth	GK	1				2				3			
39	(Croatia) Ivan Herceg	DF	6		3		2				8		3	
42	(Hungary) Márton Lorentz	DF	1				1				2			
47	(Hungary) Ádám Zima	GK												
49	(Serbia) Branko Pauljević	DF	31	1	3	1					31	1	3	1
50	(Hungary) Bence Péter	FW	1				1	2			2	2		
52	(Hungary) Alex Damásdi	FW					1				1			
53	(Hungary) András Erdei	MF												
54	(Hungary) Ayrton De Oliveira	DF												
64	(Hungary) Gergő Kocsis	DF	3		1		1				4		1	
77	(Hungary) László Pekár	FW	31	7	2		1				32	7	2	
88	(Hungary) Dávid Márkvárt	MF	31	3	7		1		1		32	3	8	
91	(Netherlands) Geoffrey Castillion	FW	8			1					8			1
91	(Hungary) Gergő Vaszicsku	DF					1				1			
99	(Hungary) Gábor Makrai	FW					1				1			
Own goals				2				1				3		
Totals				35	68	4		5	4			40	72	4

=== Clean sheets ===
			Clean sheets		
No.	Player	Games Played	Nemzeti Bajnokság I	Magyar Kupa	Total
27	(Hungary) Krisztián Pogacsics	27	6		6
15	(Serbia) Filip Pajović	5	1		1
31	(Hungary) Tamás Horváth	3	0	1	1
15	(Hungary) Renátó Boros	0			0
47	(Hungary) Ádám Zima	0			0
Totals			7	1	8
