= István Mitring =

Hungarian footballer

Personal information
- Date of birth: 5 September 1969 (age 56)
- Place of birth: Mosonmagyaróvár, Hungary
- Position: Goalkeeper

Senior career*
Years	Team	Apps	(Gls)
-1989	Fehérvár FC		
1989-1990	Budapest Honvéd FC		
1990-1996	Fehérvár FC	18+	(0+)
1996-1997	BFC Siófok	8+	(0+)
1997/1998	Érdi VSE	2+	(0+)
1997/98-1998/99	Fehérvár FC	3+	(0+)
-2003	Myllykosken Pallo -47	110+	(0+)
2004-2005	Kuopion Palloseura	15+	(0+)
-2009/10	Polgárdi VSE	70+	(0+)
2010/11-2011/12	FC Felcsút	3	(0)
- * Club domestic league appearances and goals

István Mitring (born 5 September 1969 in Hungary) is a Hungarian retired footballer.
