= Nikoletta Papp =

Hungarian handball player (born 1996)

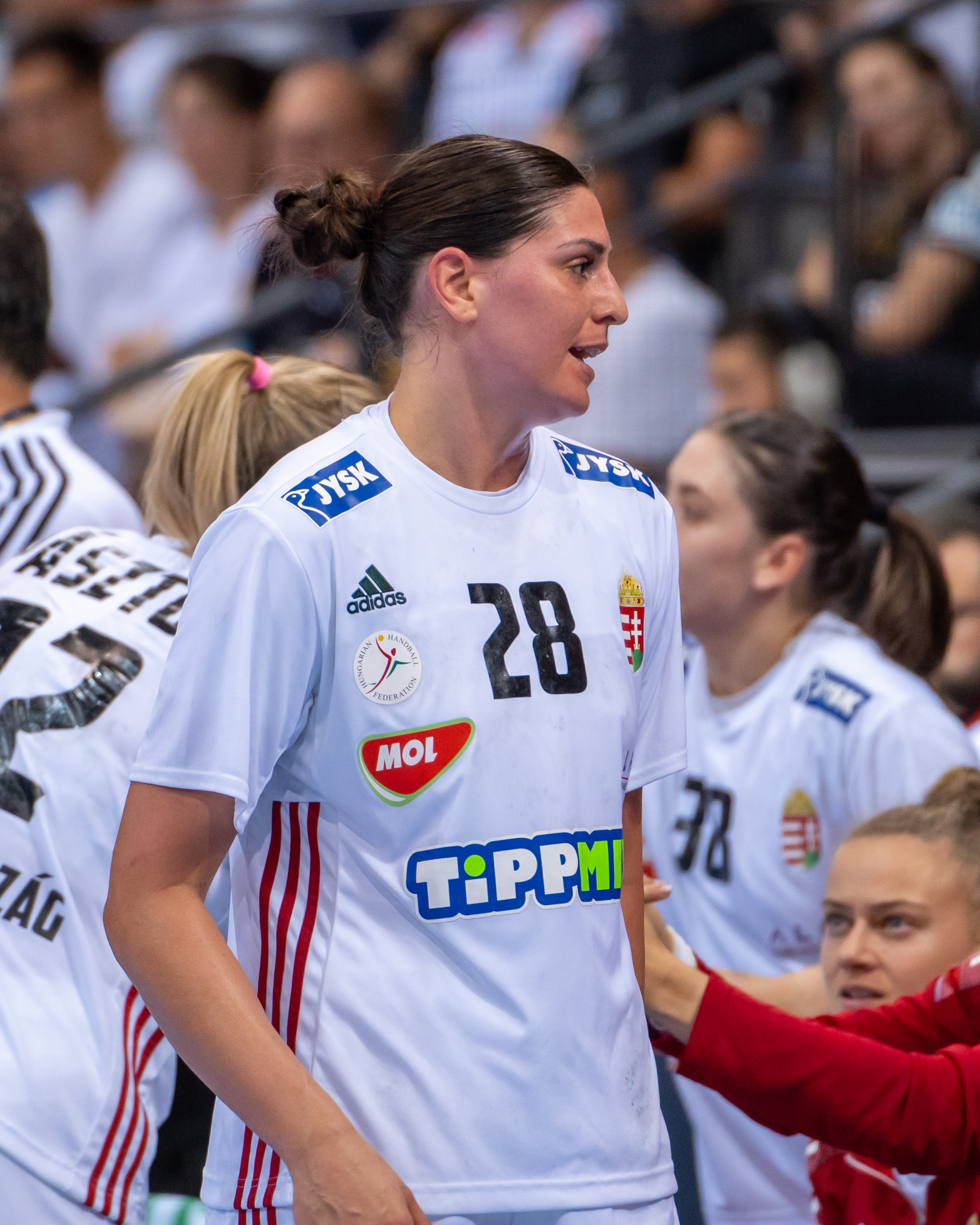

Personal information
- Nationality: Hungarian
- Born: 23 July 1996 (age 30) Budapest, Hungary
- Height: 1.82 m (6 ft 0 in)

Sport
- Sport: Handball
- Position: Right back
- Current club: Minaur Baia Mare
- Number: 28

Senior clubs
- Years: Team
- 2014–2018: Győr
- 2016–2018: → Érd (loan)
- 2018–2020: Érd
- 2020–2023: Siófok KC
- 2023–2025: Gloria Buzău
- 2025–: Minaur Baia Mare
National team
| Years | Team | Apps | (Gls) |
| 2018– | Hungary | 81 | (79) |
Medal record
European Championship
| Bronze medal – third place | 2024 Austria/Hungary/Switzerland |
- Updated on 10 December 2025

Nikoletta Papp (née: Kiss; born 23 July 1996) is a Hungarian handballer for Minaur Baia Mare and the Hungarian national team.

She debuted in the national team on 28 September 2018 against Montenegro. At the 2024 European Championship she was part of the Hungarian team that won bronze medals, losing to Norway in semifinal and beating France in the third place play-off. This was the first Hungarian medals since 2012.

Her husband is Máté Papp, a Hungarian football player.
