= Zsolt Nagy (footballer, born 1993) =

Hungarian footballer

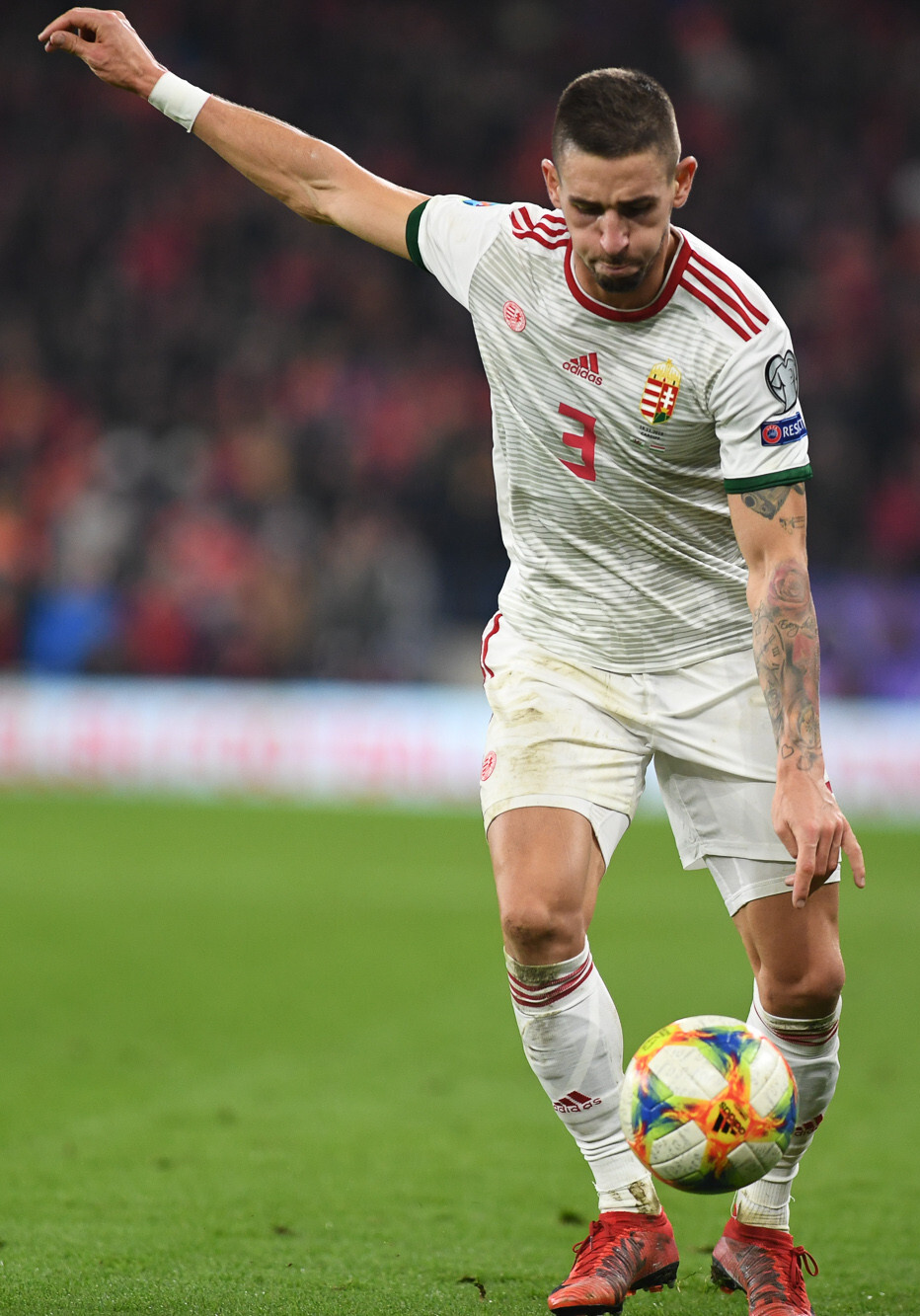
- Nagy with Hungary in 2019

Personal information
- Full name: Zsolt Nagy
- Date of birth: 25 May 1993 (age 33)
- Place of birth: Székesfehérvár, Hungary
- Height: 1.88 m (6 ft 2 in)
- Position: Left midfielder

Team information
- Current team: Puskás Akadémia
- Number: 25

Youth career
- 2003–2004: Lovasberény
- 2004–2007: Videoton
- 2007–2010: Felcsút

Senior career*
Years	Team	Apps	(Gls)
2010–2011	Felcsút	3	(1)
2011–2013	Videoton	0	(0)
2013	→ Puskás Akadémia (loan)	8	(0)
2013–	Puskás Akadémia	240	(43)
2014	→ Videoton (loan)	1	(0)
2017–2018	→ Csákvár (loan)	29	(14)

International career^{‡}
2019–	Hungary	41	(3)
- * Club domestic league appearances and goals as of 30 May 2026 ‡ National team caps and goals as of 14 November 2026

Zsolt Nagy (born 25 May 1993) is a Hungarian professional footballer who plays as a left midfielder for Puskás Akadémia and the Hungary national team.

== Club career ==
On 8 December 2023, he scored twice against in a 3–0 victory over Kecskemét the 2023–24 Nemzeti Bajnokság I season at Pancho Aréna.

On 21 December 2024, he renewed his contract with Puskás until 2028.

== International career ==
Nagy made his debut for Hungary national team on 15 November 2019 in a friendly against Uruguay. He substituted Mihály Korhut in the 75th minute.

On 11 June 2022, he scored his first goal against Germany in the 2022–23 UEFA Nations League A match at the Puskás Aréna. The match ended with a 1–1 draw. Three days later, he scored Hungary's third goal in their 4–0 win over England in the same competition.

On 14 May 2024, Nagy was named in Hungary's squad for UEFA Euro 2024. He appeared as a substitute for Milos Kerkez in both the 2–0 loss to Germany and the 1–0 win over Scotland as the Magyars finished third in Group A.

On 11 October 2024, he gave an assist to Roland Sallai in a 1–1 draw against the Netherlands in the 2024–25 UEFA Nations League A match.

== Career statistics ==
=== Club ===
As of match played 16 May 2026

Appearances and goals by club, season and competition
Club	Season	League			Magyar Kupa		Ligakupa		Europe		Total	
Club	Season	Division	Apps	Goals	Apps	Goals	Apps	Goals	Apps	Goals	Apps	Goals
Felcsút	2010–11	Hungarian Football Federation	3	1	0	0	0	0	0	0	3	1
Videoton	2012–13	Nemzeti Bajnokság I	0	0	0	0	2	0	0	0	2	0
Puskás Akadémia (loan)	2012–13	Nemzeti Bajnokság I	8	0	0	0	—		—		0	0
Puskás Akadémia	2013–14	Nemzeti Bajnokság II	8	0	0	0	0	0	—		8	0
Puskás Akadémia	2015–16	Nemzeti Bajnokság I	18	1	2	0	—		—		20	1
Puskás Akadémia	2016–17	Nemzeti Bajnokság II	25	1	0	0	—		—		25	1
Puskás Akadémia	2017–18	Nemzeti Bajnokság I	1	0	0	0	—		—		1	0
Puskás Akadémia	2018–19	Nemzeti Bajnokság I	14	3	2	0	—		—		16	3
Puskás Akadémia	2019–20	Nemzeti Bajnokság I	25	1	3	0	—		—		28	1
Puskás Akadémia	2020–21	Nemzeti Bajnokság I	27	3	4	2	—		1 (Note: Appearance in UEFA Europa League)	0	32	5
Puskás Akadémia	2021–22	Nemzeti Bajnokság I	28	1	1	0	—		4 (Note: Appearances in UEFA Conference League)	0	33	1
Puskás Akadémia	2022–23	Nemzeti Bajnokság I	9	3	2	0	—		2	0	13	1
Puskás Akadémia	2023–24	Nemzeti Bajnokság I	26	11	1	0	—		–		27	11
Puskás Akadémia	2024–25	Nemzeti Bajnokság I	31	12	1	0	–		4	4	36	16
Puskás Akadémia	2025–26	Nemzeti Bajnokság I	28	7	1	0	–		2	0	31	7
Puskás Akadémia	Total		240	43	18	2	0	0	13	4	271	49
Videoton (loan)	2014–15	Nemzeti Bajnokság I	1	0	3	1	5	0	0	0	9	1
Csákvár (loan)	2017–18	Nemzeti Bajnokság II	17	5	1	0	—		—		18	5
Csákvár (loan)	2018–19	Nemzeti Bajnokság II	12	9	2	0	—		—		14	9
Csákvár (loan)	Total		29	14	3	0	0	0	0	0	32	14
Career total			281	56	23	3	7	0	13	4	324	63

=== International ===
As of match played 14 November 2026

Appearances and goals by national team and year
National team	Year	Apps	Goals
Hungary	2019	2	0
Hungary	2020	0	0
Hungary	2021	3	0
Hungary	2022	8	2
Hungary	2023	3	0
Hungary	2024	12	1
Hungary	2025	7	0
Hungary	2026	6	0
Total		41	3

Scores and results list Hungary's goal tally first, score column indicates score after each Nagy goal.

List of international goals scored by Zsolt Nagy
No.	Date	Venue	Opponent	Score	Result	Competition
1	11 June 2022	Puskás Aréna, Budapest, Hungary	Germany	1–0	1–1	2022–23 UEFA Nations League A
2	14 June 2022	Molineux Stadium, Wolverhampton, England	England	3–0	4–0	2022–23 UEFA Nations League A
3	26 March 2024	Puskás Aréna, Budapest, Hungary	Kosovo	2–0	2–0	Friendly
