= Máté Papp =

Hungarian footballer

Personal information
- Date of birth: 12 March 1993 (age 33)
- Place of birth: Budapest, Hungary
- Height: 1.84 m (6 ft 0 in)
- Position: Defensive midfielder

Team information
- Current team: Dunaújváros

Youth career
- 2003–2007: MTK
- 2007–2013: Videoton

Senior career*
Years	Team	Apps	(Gls)
2013–2015	Videoton	0	(0)
2013	→ Dunaújváros (loan)	12	(2)
2014	→ Puskás (loan)	5	(0)
2015	→ Dunaújváros (loan)	3	(0)
2015–2016	Sopron	4	(0)
2016	→ Soroksár (loan)	9	(1)
2016–2017	Soroksár	17	(1)
2017–2019	Csákvár	25	(0)
2019–2021	Nyíregyháza	33	(3)
2021–	Dunaújváros	30	(5)

International career
2009–2010	Hungary U17	6	(0)
2010–2012	Hungary U18	8	(0)
- * Club domestic league appearances and goals as of 24 April 2022

Máté Papp (born 12 March 1993) is a Hungarian professional footballer who plays for Dunaújváros.

He is married to Hungarian international handball player Nikoletta Papp.

== Career statistics ==
Appearances and goals by club, season and competition
Club	Season	League			Cup		League Cup		Europe		Total	
Club	Season	Division	Apps	Goals	Apps	Goals	Apps	Goals	Apps	Goals	Apps	Goals
Videoton	2012–13	Nemzeti Bajnokság I	0	0	0	0	2	0	0	0	2	0
Dunaújváros	2013–14	Nemzeti Bajnokság II	12	2	4	0	2	0	0	0	18	2
Puskás	2014–15	Nemzeti Bajnokság I	5	0	2	0	4	1	0	0	11	1
Career total			17	2	6	0	8	1	0	0	31	3

Updated to games played as of 19 October 2014.
