= Balázs Tóth (footballer, born 1981) =

Hungarian footballer

Personal information
- Full name: Balázs József Tóth
- Date of birth: 24 September 1981 (age 45)
- Place of birth: Ózd, Hungary
- Height: 1.75 m (5 ft 9 in)
- Position: Defensive midfielder

Team information
- Current team: Puskás (loan from Videoton)
- Number: 20

Youth career
- Ózd

Senior career*
Years	Team	Apps	(Gls)
2000–2005	Videoton	115	(16)
2005–2006	Malatyaspor	47	(1)
2006–2007	Kayseri Erciyesspor	11	(0)
2007–2011	Genk	66	(8)
2010–2011	→ VVV-Venlo (loan)	29	(2)
2011–2015	Videoton	45	(1)
2014–2015	→ Puskás (loan)	29	(3)

International career
1998–1999	Hungary U18	3	(0)
2004–2010	Hungary	34	(0)
- * Club domestic league appearances and goals

Balázs József Tóth (Hungarian pronunciation: [ˈbɒlaːʒ ˈtoːt], born 24 September 1981) is a retired Hungarian football midfielder. He is a Hungarian international.

== Career ==
Tóth signed a three-year contract with the Genk who upset the form book by finishing second in the Belgian First Division in 2005–06. Tóth started his career at Videoton before moving to Turkey with Malatyaspor midway through the 2004–05 season. He spent the 2005–06 season on loan at Kayseri Erciyesspor.

== International career ==
He made his senior international debut against Latvia on 19 February 2004. He gained 34 caps and played his last international game for Hungary in the Wembley Stadium against England on 11 August 2010.

== Career statistics ==
=== Club ===
Club	Season	League			Cup		League Cup		Europe		Other		Total	
Club	Season	Division	Apps	Goals	Apps	Goals	Apps	Goals	Apps	Goals	Apps	Goals	Apps	Goals
Videoton	2000–01	Nemzeti Bajnokság I	25	0	0	0	0	0	0	0	0	0	25	0
Videoton	2001–02	Nemzeti Bajnokság I	27	2	0	0	0	0	0	0	0	0	27	2
Videoton	2002–03	Nemzeti Bajnokság I	23	3	3	1	0	0	0	0	0	0	26	4
Videoton	2003–04	Nemzeti Bajnokság I	26	6	2	1	0	0	2	0	0	0	30	7
Videoton	2004–05	Nemzeti Bajnokság I	14	5	3	2	0	0	0	0	0	0	17	7
Videoton	Total		115	16	8	4	0	0	2	0	0	0	125	20
Malatyaspor	2004–05	Süper Lig	15	0	0	0	0	0	0	0	0	0	15	0
Malatyaspor	2005–06	Süper Lig	31	1	0	0	0	0	0	0	0	0	31	1
Malatyaspor	2006–07	Süper Lig	1	0	0	0	0	0	0	0	0	0	1	0
Malatyaspor	Total		47	1	0	0	0	0	0	0	0	0	47	1
Erciyesspor	2006–07	Süper Lig	11	0	0	0	0	0	0	0	0	0	11	0
Erciyesspor	Total		11	0	0	0	0	0	0	0	0	0	11	0
Genk	2007–08	Belgian First Division	23	3	0	0	0	0	2	0	0	0	25	3
Genk	2008–09	Belgian First Division	28	5	5	0	0	0	0	0	0	0	33	5
Genk	2009–10	Belgian First Division	15	0	0	0	0	0	2	0	4 (Note: Belgian Pro League playoffs)	0	21	0
Genk	Total		66	8	5	0	0	0	4	0	4	0	79	8
Venlo	2010–11	Eredivisie	29	2	1	1	0	0	0	0	4 (Note: Eredivisie relegation playoffs)	1	34	4
Venlo	Total		29	2	1	1	0	0	0	0	4	1	34	4
Videoton	2011–12	Nemzeti Bajnokság I	20	0	7	0	6	0	0	0	0	0	33	0
Videoton	2012–13	Nemzeti Bajnokság I	21	1	2	0	5	0	10	0	1 (Note: Szuperkupa)	0	38	1
Videoton	2013–14	Nemzeti Bajnokság I	4	0	3	0	5	0	2	0	0	0	14	0
Videoton	Total		45	1	12	0	16	0	12	0	1	0	86	1
Puskás	2013–14	Nemzeti Bajnokság I	11	1	0	0	1	0	0	0	0	0	12	1
Puskás	2014–15	Nemzeti Bajnokság I	18	2	1	0	0	0	0	0	0	0	19	2
Puskás	Total		29	3	1	0	1	0	0	0	0	0	31	3
Career total			342	31	27	5	17	0	18	0	9	1	413	37
