= Stefan Denković =

Montenegrin footballer (born 1991)

Stefan Denković Стефан Денковић
Personal information
- Date of birth: 16 June 1991 (age 35)
- Place of birth: Belgrade, SFR Yugoslavia
- Height: 1.84 m (6 ft 0 in)
- Position: Forward

Team information
- Current team: Mornar
- Number: 7

Youth career
- Red Star Belgrade

Senior career*
Years	Team	Apps	(Gls)
2009–2011	Red Star Belgrade	0	(0)
2009–2011	→ Sopot (loan)	40	(1)
2011–2013	Hapoel Haifa	52	(2)
2013–2014	Vojvodina	1	(0)
2014	Puskás	21	(0)
2015	Zawisza Bydgoszcz	3	(0)
2016	Osotspa		
2016	Zemun	1	(0)
2017	Bokelj	15	(4)
2017–2018	Sutjeska Nikšić	32	(6)
2018–2021	Spartak Subotica	65	(20)
2021	Kaisar	21	(1)
2022	Dinamo Batumi	4	(0)
2022	Dečić	15	(6)
2023–2024	Igman Konjic	45	(13)
2025	Radnik Bijeljina	11	(3)
2025–	Mornar	30	(10)

International career
2009–2010	Montenegro U19	6	(1)
- * Club domestic league appearances and goals as of 17 June 2026

Stefan Denković (Serbian Cyrillic: Стефан Денковић; born 16 June 1991) is a Montenegrin professional footballer who plays as a forward for Mornar.

== Club career ==
An ethnic Montenegrin born in Belgrade, Serbia, Denković started playing in the youth team of Red Star Belgrade and he made his senior debut in 2009 when he was loaned to Red Star's farm team, FK Sopot, where he played two seasons in the Serbian League Belgrade, Serbian third tier before moving to Israel in summer 2011. There he made his competitive debut on 20 August 2011 as a substitute in Hapoel Haifa's 1–0 loss to Ironi Kiryat Shmona.

In spring 2016, Denković played with Osotspa Samut Prakan in Thai Premier League, and in summer he returned to Europe and joined FK Zemun from the Serbian First League.

== International career ==
He has been a member of the Montenegrin under-19 national team since 2009.

== Honours ==
Hapoel Haifa

- Toto Cup: 2012–13

Sutjeska

- Montenegrin First League: 2017–18
