= Gáspár Orbán =

Hungarian footballer and religious leader

Personal information
- Full name: Gáspár Orbán
- Date of birth: 7 February 1992 (age 34)
- Place of birth: Budapest, Hungary
- Height: 1.82 m (6 ft 0 in)
- Position: Midfielder

Senior career*
Years	Team	Apps	(Gls)
2010–2012	Videoton FC	11	(0)
2012–2014	Puskás Akadémia FC	3	(0)
Total		14	(0)
- * Club domestic league appearances and goals

Gáspár Orbán (born 7 February 1992) is a Hungarian lawyer, soldier and former professional footballer. He is the son of former Hungarian Prime Minister Viktor Orbán.

== Early life ==
Gáspár Orbán was born in 1992 in Budapest, as the second child of Viktor Orbán and Anikó Lévai. He completed his secondary school studies at the Premontre Szent Norbert High School in Gödöllő, where he graduated in 2011. In 2018, he graduated as a lawyer from the Faculty of State and Law of Eötvös Loránd University. During his university years, he was a member of István Bibó College for advanced studies, of which his father was a member between 1983 and 1987. Around this time, he completed an anti-corruption course organized by Transparency International. He wrote his thesis, entitled The issue of gay marriage in Hungary and Europe: same-sex marriage and possible directions for the regulation of the family, under the supervision of Szabolcs Nagypál.

Orbán was raised in the Catholic Church, together with his four sisters.

== Football career ==
Gáspár Orbán played as a midfielder for Videoton II and Puskás Akadémia. According to the MLSZ database, Orbán played in twelve NB II and two NB I matches from 2011 to 2014, spending a total of 347 minutes on the pitch during his professional career. He didn't score a goal.

== Military career ==
In 2019, Orbán became a professional soldier. In 2020, he went to the Royal Military Academy Sandhurst with a study agreement with the Hungarian state and graduated in January 2021. He undertook five years of military service in exchange.

In October 2023, Orbán appeared, officially as a liaison officer, on at least 3 diplomatic trips to Chad and Niger as part of Hungary's diplomatic-military deployment in the Sahel strip. According to an investigation by Le Monde and Direkt36, Orbán was crucial in securing political contacts, notably with the son of the President of Niger.

During the parliamentary election campaign in April 2026, an interview was published with Hungarian Army Captain Szilveszter Pálinkás, who sharply criticized Viktor Orbán government's defense policy. He said about Gáspár Orbán that he had attended Sandhurst together in 2020, where Gáspár Orbán entered without a selection process. Orbán allegedly told him that he had a "divine inspiration" to help African Christians. After their return home, Orbán "was given an office in the Carmelite" and, as a first lieutenant, began planning the Hungarian Army's mission to Chad. According to Orbán, he also expected a 50% casualty rate in connection with the mission. According to Minister of Defence Kristóf Szalay-Bobrovniczky, the statement was made with political intent, and he wrote that "the Hungarian Defence Forces is an institution independent of party politics, and will remain so." He later denied that there was a Chadian mission, even though Szalay-Bobrovniczky himself had made several statements about it years earlier and parliament had voted on it.

Following the 2026 election, in which Viktor Orbán suffered a landslide defeat, Gáspár Orbán was discharged from the army. He submitted his demobilization request months before the election.
