= Patrik Tischler =

Hungarian footballer

Personal information
- Date of birth: 30 July 1991 (age 35)
- Place of birth: Budapest, Hungary
- Height: 1.79 m (5 ft 10 in)
- Position: Forward

Team information
- Current team: Dorog
- Number: 27

Youth career
- 2003–2008: MTK
- 2009–2010: → Oldham (loan)

Senior career*
Years	Team	Apps	(Gls)
2008–2013	MTK	88	(35)
2013–2017	Puskás Akadémia	108	(42)
2016	→ Videoton (loan)	11	(2)
2017–2019	Újpest	33	(4)
2018–2019	→ Budapest Honvéd (loan)	19	(1)
2019–2020	Kisvárda	26	(5)
2020–2022	Debrecen	48	(11)
2022–2023	Budafok	21	(1)
2023–2025	Bicske	36	(19)
2025–	Dorog	17	(9)

International career
2009–2010	Hungary U-19	5	(1)
2010–2012	Hungary U-21	8	(0)
- * Club domestic league appearances and goals as of 14 January 2026

Patrik Tischler (born 30 July 1991) is a Hungarian football player.

== Club career ==
He made his debut for MTK during the 2008–09 season and joined Oldham on loan in 2009 as part of an agreement between Oldham, MTK and Liverpool. He joined the club's new Development squad. He was given the no. 34 squad number and was named as substitute for the first-team on a number of occasions. In February 2010 he returned to MTK after his loan period was cut short.

On 21 June 2022, Tischler signed with Budafok.

== International career ==
Tischler has represented Hungary at international level as an under-19 and under-21 player.

== Career statistics ==
Club	Season	League			Cup		League Cup		Europe		Total	
Club	Season	Division	Apps	Goals	Apps	Goals	Apps	Goals	Apps	Goals	Apps	Goals
MTK
MTK	2007–08	Nemzeti Bajnokság I	0	0	0	0	1	0	0	0	1	0
MTK	2008–09	Nemzeti Bajnokság I	1	1	1	1	3	0	0	0	5	2
MTK	2009–10	Nemzeti Bajnokság I	3	0	0	0	0	0	0	0	3	0
MTK	2010–11	Nemzeti Bajnokság I	30	12	5	1	1	0	0	0	36	13
MTK	2011–12	Nemzeti Bajnokság II	25	15	6	4	6	2	0	0	37	21
MTK	2012–13	Nemzeti Bajnokság I	29	7	1	0	2	0	1	0	33	7
MTK	Total		88	35	13	6	13	2	1	0	115	43
Puskás Akadémia
Puskás Akadémia	2013–14	Nemzeti Bajnokság I	28	9	1	0	5	1	—		34	10
Puskás Akadémia	2014–15	Nemzeti Bajnokság I	30	15	3	7	4	2	—		37	24
Puskás Akadémia	2015–16	Nemzeti Bajnokság I	18	3	2	1	—		—		20	4
Puskás Akadémia	2016–17	Nemzeti Bajnokság II	32	15	2	3	—		—		34	18
Puskás Akadémia	Total		108	42	8	11	9	3	0	0	125	56
Videoton	2015–16	Nemzeti Bajnokság I	11	2	1	0	—		0	0	12	2
Újpest
Újpest	2017–18	Nemzeti Bajnokság I	27	4	9	10	—		—		36	14
Újpest	2018–19	Nemzeti Bajnokság I	5	0	0	0	—		3	0	8	0
Újpest	Total		32	4	9	10	0	0	3	0	44	14
Budapest Honvéd	2018–19	Nemzeti Bajnokság I	19	1	8	4	—		0	0	27	5
Kisvárda	2019–20	Nemzeti Bajnokság I	26	5	3	1	—		—		29	6
Debrecen
Debrecen	2020–21	Nemzeti Bajnokság II	26	8	5	2	—		—		31	10
Debrecen	2021–22	Nemzeti Bajnokság I	22	3	1	0	—		—		23	3
Debrecen	Total		48	11	6	2	0	0	0	0	54	13
Career total			332	100	48	34	22	5	4	0	406	139

Updated to games played as of 15 May 2022.
