= Andor Margitics =

Hungarian footballer (born 1991)

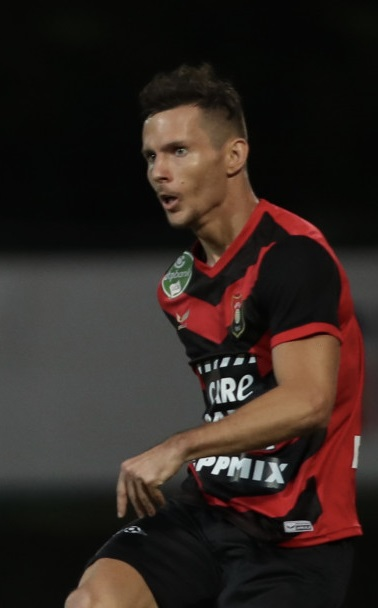
- Margitics playing for Budafok in 2020

Personal information
- Date of birth: 3 January 1991 (age 35)
- Place of birth: Budapest, Hungary
- Height: 1.82 m (6 ft 0 in)
- Position: Right-back

Youth career
- 2003–2007: Újbuda

Senior career*
Years	Team	Apps	(Gls)
2007–2010	Újbuda	10	(2)
2007–2009	→ Vác (loan)	57	(9)
2010–2012	Videoton	0	(0)
2009–2012	→ Puskás Akadémia (loan)	65	(5)
2012–2015	Puskás Akadémia	47	(2)
2015–2023	Budafok	202	(5)

International career^{‡}
2009–2010	Hungary U19	6	(0)
2011–2012	Hungary U21		
- * Club domestic league appearances and goals as of 21 May 2023 ‡ National team caps and goals as of 15 September 2013

Andor Margitics (born 3 January 1991) is a Hungarian former professional footballer who played as a right-back.

== Club statistics ==
Appearances and goals by club, season and competition
Club	Season	League			Cup		League Cup		Europe		Total	
Club	Season	Division	Apps	Goals	Apps	Goals	Apps	Goals	Apps	Goals	Apps	Goals
Vác
Vác	2007–08	Nemzeti Bajnokság II	30	4	1	1	—		—		31	5
Vác	2008–09	Nemzeti Bajnokság II	27	5	1	0	9	0	—		37	5
Vác	Total		57	9	2	1	9	0	0	0	68	10
Újbuda	2009–10	Nemzeti Bajnokság III	10	2	1	0	—		—		11	2
Videoton
Videoton	2009–10	Nemzeti Bajnokság I	0	0	0	0	2	0	—		2	0
Videoton	2011–12	Nemzeti Bajnokság I	0	0	1	0	5	0	—		6	0
Videoton	Total		0	0	1	0	7	0	0	0	8	0
Puskás Akadémia
Puskás Akadémia	2009–10	Nemzeti Bajnokság II	11	3	0	0	—		—		11	3
Puskás Akadémia	2010–11	Nemzeti Bajnokság II	27	1	2	0	—		—		29	1
Puskás Akadémia	2011–12	Nemzeti Bajnokság II	27	1	2	0	—		—		29	1
Puskás Akadémia	2012–13	Nemzeti Bajnokság II	29	1	0	0	—		—		29	1
Puskás Akadémia	2013–14	Nemzeti Bajnokság I	10	1	2	0	3	0	—		15	1
Puskás Akadémia	2014–15	Nemzeti Bajnokság I	8	0	1	0	4	0	—		13	0
Puskás Akadémia	Total		112	7	7	0	7	0	0	0	126	7
Budafok
Budafok	2015–16	Nemzeti Bajnokság III	33	2	2	0	—		—		35	2
Budafok	2016–17	Nemzeti Bajnokság III	30	1	8	0	—		—		38	1
Budafok	2017–18	Nemzeti Bajnokság II	33	1	3	0	—		—		36	1
Budafok	2018–19	Nemzeti Bajnokság II	30	0	1	0	—		—		31	0
Budafok	2019–20	Nemzeti Bajnokság II	17	0	2	0	—		—		19	0
Budafok	2020–21	Nemzeti Bajnokság I	20	0	2	0	—		—		22	0
Budafok	Total		163	4	18	0	0	0	0	0	181	4
Career total			342	22	29	1	23	0	0	0	394	23

Updated to games played as of 15 May 2021.
