= László Lencse =

Hungarian footballer

Personal information
- Date of birth: 2 July 1988 (age 38)
- Place of birth: Győr, Hungary
- Height: 1.80 m (5 ft 11 in)
- Position: Striker

Team information
- Current team: SC Lockenhaus

Youth career
- Góliát
- Győr
- Gyirmót

Senior career*
Years	Team	Apps	(Gls)
2007–2009	MTK	39	(12)
2008–2009	→ MTK II	5	(2)
2010–2014	Videoton	30	(6)
2011	→ Videoton II	5	(4)
2011–2012	→ Kecskemét (loan)	21	(15)
2012	→ Ironi Kiryat Shmona (loan)	10	(2)
2013	→ Asteras Tripoli (loan)	9	(3)
2013–2014	→ Puskás (loan)	24	(15)
2014–2017	Puskás	80	(24)
2016	→ Újpest (loan)	13	(4)
2017–2021	MTK Budapest	98	(42)
2021–2022	Gyirmót	28	(11)
2022–2023	Haladás	37	(4)
2023–	SC Lockenhaus	0	(0)

International career
2006–2007	Hungary U19	2	(0)
2009–2010	Hungary U21	5	(0)
- * Club domestic league appearances and goals as of 31 May 2023

László Lencse (born 2 July 1988) is a Hungarian football player who plays for Austrian club SC Lockenhaus.

== Club career ==
On 6 January 2022, Lencse signed with Haladás. In June 2023, Lencse moved to Austrian club SC Lockenhaus.

== International career ==
Lencse was named in Hungary's provisional squad for UEFA Euro 2016 but was cut from the final squad.

== Career statistics ==
Appearances and goals by club, season and competition
Club	Season	League			Cup		League Cup		Europe		Total	
Club	Season	Division	Apps	Goals	Apps	Goals	Apps	Goals	Apps	Goals	Apps	Goals
MTK Budapest	2007–08	Nemzeti Bajnokság I	3	0	0	0	12	3	—		15	3
MTK Budapest	2008–09	Nemzeti Bajnokság I	22	3	6	4	6	0	—		34	7
MTK Budapest	2009–10	Nemzeti Bajnokság I	14	9	5	1	2	1	—		21	11
MTK Budapest	2017–18	Nemzeti Bajnokság II	33	22	3	0	—		—		36	22
MTK Budapest	2018–19	Nemzeti Bajnokság I	31	6	1	0	—		—		32	6
MTK Budapest	2019–20	Nemzeti Bajnokság II	27	14	5	0	—		—		32	14
MTK Budapest	Total		130	54	20	5	20	4	0	0	170	64
Videoton	2009–10	Nemzeti Bajnokság I	9	0	0	0	5	0	—		14	0
Videoton	2010–11	Nemzeti Bajnokság I	14	3	5	3	2	0	2	0	23	6
Videoton	Total		23	3	5	3	7	0	2	0	37	6
Kecskemét	2011–12	Nemzeti Bajnokság I	21	15	3	0	7	3	—		31	18
Shmona	2012–13	Israeli Premier League	10	2	4	2	—		8	2	22	6
Asteras Tripoli	2012–13	Super League Greece	12	3	3	0	—		—		15	3
Puskás Akadémia	2013–14	Nemzeti Bajnokság I	24	15	3	3	4	3	—		31	21
Puskás Akadémia	2014–15	Nemzeti Bajnokság I	29	9	1	0	3	1	—		33	10
Puskás Akadémia	2015–16	Nemzeti Bajnokság I	17	4	2	1	—		—		19	5
Puskás Akadémia	2016–17	Nemzeti Bajnokság II	34	11	2	1	—		—		36	12
Puskás Akadémia	Total		104	39	8	5	7	4	0	0	129	48
Újpest	2015–16	Nemzeti Bajnokság I	13	3	3	2	—		—		16	5
Career total			313	119	46	17	41	11	10	2	420	149

Updated to games played as of 26 May 2020.
