= Tibor Molnár (footballer, born 1993) =

Hungarian footballer

Personal information
- Date of birth: 12 May 1993 (age 33)
- Place of birth: Székesfehérvár, Hungary
- Height: 1.82 m (6 ft 0 in)
- Position: Forward

Team information
- Current team: Budaörs
- Number: 14

Youth career
- 2004–2011: Videoton

Senior career*
Years	Team	Apps	(Gls)
2011–2012	Felcsút	13	(0)
2012–2013	Videoton	0	(0)
2013–2018	Puskás	9	(0)
2013–2014	→ Videoton II (loan)		
2014–2018	→ Csákvári (loan)	109	(21)
2018–2019	Ajka		
2019–2021	Budaörs	47	(8)
2021–2022	Ostuni		
2022–	Budaörs	13	(2)
- * Club domestic league appearances and goals as of 1 May 2022

Tibor Molnár (born 12 May 1993) is a Hungarian professional footballer who plays for Budaörsi SC.

== Career statistics ==
Appearances and goals by club, season and competition
Club	Season	League			Cup		League Cup		Europe		Total	
Club	Season	Division	Apps	Goals	Apps	Goals	Apps	Goals	Apps	Goals	Apps	Goals
Felcsút	2011–12	Nemzeti Bajnokság II	13	0	0	0	0	0	0	0	13	0
Videoton	2012–13	Nemzeti Bajnokság I	0	0	0	0	1	0	0	0	1	0
Puskás	2013–14	Nemzeti Bajnokság I	9	0	1	0	4	1	0	0	14	1
Career total			22	0	1	0	5	1	0	0	28	1

Updated to games played as of 13 November 2013.
