= Gergő Vaszicsku =

Hungarian footballer

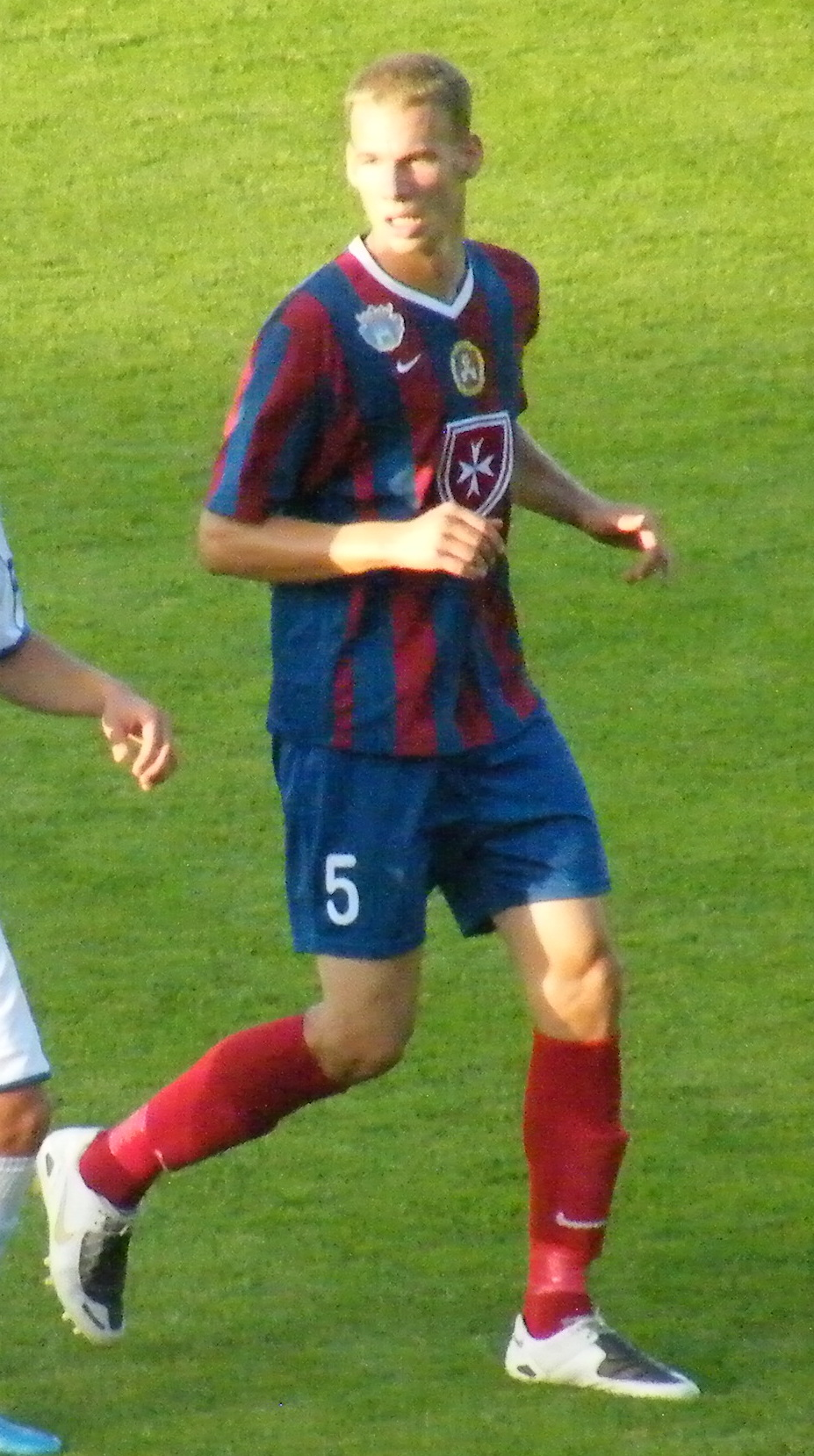

Personal information
- Date of birth: 30 June 1991 (age 35)
- Place of birth: Debrecen, Hungary
- Height: 1.88 m (6 ft 2 in)
- Position: Defender

Team information
- Current team: Budafok
- Number: 91

Youth career
- 2003–2007: Jászfényszaru

Senior career*
Years	Team	Apps	(Gls)
2007–2008	Jászberény	1	(0)
2008–2015	Fehérvár	0	(0)
2008–2009	→ Fehérvár II	2	(0)
2009	→ Felcsút (loan)	12	(0)
2009–2012	→ Puskás Akadémia (loan)	40	(0)
2012–2016	Puskás Akadémia	61	(1)
2016	→ Csákvár (loan)	2	(0)
2016–	Budafok	127	(8)
- * Club domestic league appearances and goals as of 30 May 2023

Gergő Vaszicsku (born 30 June 1991) is a Hungarian professional footballer who plays for Budafoki MTE.

== Career statistics ==
Appearances and goals by club, season and competition
Club	Season	League			Cup		League Cup		Europe		Total	
Club	Season	Division	Apps	Goals	Apps	Goals	Apps	Goals	Apps	Goals	Apps	Goals
Jászberény	2007–08	Nemzeti Bajnokság III	1	0	0	0	—		—		1	0
Felcsút	2008–09	Nemzeti Bajnokság II	12	0	0	0	—		—		12	0
Fehérvár II	2008–09	Nemzeti Bajnokság III	2	0	5	2	—		—		7	2
Fehérvár
Fehérvár	2008–09	Nemzeti Bajnokság I	0	0	0	0	2	0	—		2	0
Fehérvár	2009–10	Nemzeti Bajnokság I	0	0	0	0	2	0	—		2	0
Fehérvár	Total		0	0	0	0	4	0	0	0	4	0
Bicske	2010–11	Nemzeti Bajnokság III	16	0	1	0	—		—		17	0
Puskás Akadémia
Puskás Akadémia	2009–10	Nemzeti Bajnokság II	5	0	2	0	—		—		7	0
Puskás Akadémia	2010–11	Nemzeti Bajnokság II	11	0	0	0	—		—		11	0
Puskás Akadémia	2011–12	Nemzeti Bajnokság II	24	0	2	0	—		—		26	0
Puskás Akadémia	2012–13	Nemzeti Bajnokság II	19	0	0	0	—		—		19	0
Puskás Akadémia	2013–14	Nemzeti Bajnokság I	27	1	1	0	6	1	—		34	2
Puskás Akadémia	2014–15	Nemzeti Bajnokság I	15	0	0	0	4	0	—		19	0
Puskás Akadémia	2015–16	Nemzeti Bajnokság I	0	0	1	0	—		—		1	0
Puskás Akadémia	Total		101	1	6	0	10	1	0	0	117	2
Csákvár	2015–16	Nemzeti Bajnokság II	2	0	3	0	—		—		5	0
Budafok
Budafok	2016–17	Nemzeti Bajnokság III	32	3	8	0	—		—		40	3
Budafok	2017–18	Nemzeti Bajnokság II	19	0	3	0	—		—		22	0
Budafok	2018–19	Nemzeti Bajnokság II	16	2	1	0	—		—		17	2
Budafok	2019–20	Nemzeti Bajnokság II	16	1	1	0	—		—		17	1
Budafok	2020–21	Nemzeti Bajnokság I	10	1	2	0	—		—		12	1
Budafok	Total		93	7	15	0	0	0	0	0	108	7
Career total			227	8	30	2	14	1	0	0	271	11

Updated to games played as of 15 May 2021.
