= László Tóth (footballer) =

Hungarian footballer (born 1995)

Personal information
- Date of birth: 9 July 1995 (age 31)
- Place of birth: Jászberény, Hungary
- Height: 1.84 m (6 ft 0 in)
- Position: Midfielder

Team information
- Current team: Szolnok
- Number: 9

Youth career
- 2003–2006: Jánoshida
- 2006–2009: Jászberény
- 2009–2011: Felcsút
- 2011–2012: Videoton

Senior career*
Years	Team	Apps	(Gls)
2012–2013	Videoton	0	(0)
2013–2016	Puskás	4	(0)
2015	→ Balmazújváros (loan)	10	(0)
2015–2016	→ Mezőkövesd (loan)	2	(0)
2016–2018	Szolnok	65	(25)
2018–2021	Kazincbarcika	60	(10)
2019–2020	→ Vasas (loan)	3	(0)
2021–	Szolnok	26	(2)

International career
2011	Hungary U17	1	(0)
2013–2014	Hungary U19	2	(0)
- * Club domestic league appearances and goals as of 1 May 2022

László Tóth (born 9 July 1995) is a Hungarian professional footballer who plays for Szolnok.

== Career statistics ==
Appearances and goals by club, season and competition
Club	Season	League			Cup		League Cup		Europe		Total	
Club	Season	Division	Apps	Goals	Apps	Goals	Apps	Goals	Apps	Goals	Apps	Goals
Videoton	2012–13	Nemzeti Bajnokság I	0	0	0	0	2	0	0	0	2	0
Puskás
Puskás	2013–14	Nemzeti Bajnokság I	3	0	0	0	3	1	0	0	6	1
Puskás	2014–15	Nemzeti Bajnokság I	1	0	2	1	1	0	0	0	4	1
Puskás	Total		4	0	2	1	4	1	0	0	10	2
Career total			4	0	2	1	6	1	0	0	12	2

Updated to games played as of 9 September 2014.
