= Fábio Guarú =

Brazilian footballer (born 1987)

Personal information
- Full name: Fábio Nascimento de Oliveira
- Date of birth: 3 September 1987 (age 39)
- Place of birth: Guarulhos, Brazil
- Height: 1.83 m (6 ft 0 in)
- Position: Defender

Team information
- Current team: Monor

Senior career*
Years	Team	Apps	(Gls)
2008–2011	Capibaribe	1	(0)
2011	Ferroviária	0	(0)
2011–2012	Bragantino	1	(0)
2012	Szigetszentmiklósi	6	(0)
2012–2015	Puskás	46	(0)
2015–2017	Békéscsaba	57	(1)
2018	FK Csíkszereda		
2019	Tiszakécske	12	(1)
2020–	Monor	4	(0)
- * Club domestic league appearances and goals as of 21:10, 18 August 2020 (UTC)

Fábio Nascimento de Oliveira (born 3 September 1987 in Guarulhos), known as Fábio Guarú, is a Brazilian professional footballer who plays for Monori SE in Hungary.

== Club statistics ==
Club	Season	League		Cup		League Cup		Europe		Total	
Club	Season	Apps	Goals	Apps	Goals	Apps	Goals	Apps	Goals	Apps	Goals
Szigetszentmiklós
Szigetszentmiklós	2011–12	6	0	0	0	0	0	0	0	6	0
Szigetszentmiklós	Total	6	0	0	0	0	0	0	0	6	0
Puskás
Puskás	2012–13	23	0	0	0	0	0	0	0	23	0
Puskás	2013–14	14	0	1	0	4	0	0	0	19	0
Puskás	2014–15	3	0	1	0	2	0	0	0	6	0
Total	40	0	2	0	6	0	0	0	48	0	
Career Total		46	0	2	0	6	0	0	0	54	0

Updated to games played as of 28 September 2014.
