= Ľuboš Hajdúch =

Slovak footballer

Personal information
- Full name: Ľuboš Hajdúch
- Date of birth: 6 March 1980 (age 46)
- Place of birth: Levice, Czechoslovakia
- Height: 1.94 m (6 ft 4 in)
- Position: Goalkeeper

Senior career*
Years	Team	Apps	(Gls)
2002–2009	Ružomberok	149	(0)
2009–2010	Levadiakos	0	(0)
2011	Nieciecza	2	(0)
2011–2013	Kaposvár	57	(0)
2013	Puskás	29	(0)
2015	→ Skalica (loan)	7	(0)
2016–2017	Ružomberok	10	(0)

International career
2006–2007	Slovakia	5	(0)
- * Club domestic league appearances and goals

Ľuboš Hajdúch (born 6 March 1980) is a Slovak former professional footballer who played as a goalkeeper.

== Club career ==
On 27 July 2010, Hajdúch appeared as a trialist goalkeeper for St. Johnstone F.C. against Northern Irish part-time side Distillery Lisburn Distillery F.C. in which he held a clean sheet as Saints won the game 1–0. He played as the Saints management team look to bring in another goalkeeper to challenge Graeme Smith for a first team place following the departure of club legend Alan Main.

In January 2011, he joined LKS Nieciecza. He was released half-year later.

== International career ==
He was a part of Slovakia national team, with which he has appeared five times.

== Honours ==
Ružomberok

- Slovak First Football League: 2005–06
- Slovak Cup: 2005–06
