= Bálint Károly =

Hungarian footballer

Personal information
- Date of birth: 12 January 1993 (age 33)
- Place of birth: Keszthely, Hungary
- Height: 1.85 m (6 ft 1 in)
- Position: Midfielder

Team information
- Current team: Dunaföldvár

Youth career
- 2005–2006: FC Keszthely
- 2006–2010: Zalaegerszeg
- 2010–2012: Videoton

Senior career*
Years	Team	Apps	(Gls)
2012–2013	Videoton	0	(0)
2013–2015	Puskás	1	(0)
2014	→ Békéscsaba (loan)	9	(1)
2014–2015	→ Zalaegerszeg (loan)	7	(0)
2015	Soproni	4	(0)
2016	FK Csíkszereda		
2016–2018	Pécs	59	(37)
2018–2019	Tiszakécske	23	(1)
2019–2020	Békéscsaba	3	(0)
2020–2021	Kecskeméti	37	(20)
2021–2022	Pécs	15	(2)
2022–2023	Kozármisleny	14	(1)
2023–	Dunaföldvár	8	(2)

International career
2009	Hungary U17	3	(1)
- * Club domestic league appearances and goals as of 15 October 2023

Bálint Károly (born 12 January 1993) is a Hungarian professional footballer who plays for Dunaföldvár in the Nemzeti Bajnokság III.

== Club career ==
On 17 June 2021, Károly returned to Pécs. He has been the top goalscorer in the Nemzeti Bajnokság III on two occasions.

On 2 September 2022, Károly signed with Kozármisleny.

== Career statistics ==
Appearances and goals by club, season and competition
Club	Season	League			Cup		League Cup		Europe		Total	
Club	Season	Division	Apps	Goals	Apps	Goals	Apps	Goals	Apps	Goals	Apps	Goals
Videoton	2012–13	Nemzeti Bajnokság I	0	0	0	0	2	0	0	0	2	0
Puskás	2013–14	Nemzeti Bajnokság I	1	0	0	0	2	0	0	0	3	0
Békéscsaba	2013–14	Nemzeti Bajnokság II	9	1	0	0	0	0	0	0	9	1
Career total			10	1	0	0	4	0	0	0	14	1

Updated to games played as of 10 May 2014.
