= 2022–23 Budafoki MTE season =

Budafok
2022–23 season
- Chairman: Sándor Vízi
- Manager: Csaba Csizmadia (until 22 August); János Mátyus (from 23 August)
- Stadium: Promontor utcai Stadion
- Nemzeti Bajnokság II: 10th
- Magyar Kupa: Runners-up
- Top goalscorer: League: Péter Beke (15); All: Péter Beke (21)
- Biggest win: 4–0 vs Kazincbarcika (H) (5 February 2023); Nemzeti Bajnokság II
- Biggest defeat: 0–3 vs Ajka (A) (31 July 2022); Nemzeti Bajnokság II; 1–4 vs MTK Budapest (A) (21 August 2022); Nemzeti Bajnokság II; 0–3 vs Kozármisleny (H) (9 October 2022); Nemzeti Bajnokság II; 0–3 vs Nyíregyháza (A) (30 October 2022); Nemzeti Bajnokság II
Home colours	Away colours

The 2022–23 season was Budafoki Munkás Testedző Egyesület's 62nd competitive season, 2nd consecutive season in the Nemzeti Bajnokság II and 111th year in existence as a football club. In addition to the domestic league, Budafok participated in this season's editions of the Magyar Kupa.

== First team squad ==
Note: Flags indicate national team as defined under FIFA eligibility rules; some limited exceptions apply. Players may hold more than one non-FIFA nationality.

No.	Pos.	Nation	Player
1	GK	HUN	István Oroszi
3	DF	HUN	Andor Margitics
6	MF	HUN	Botond Nándori
7	FW	HUN	Arthur Györgyi
8	MF	HUN	András Csonka
9	FW	HUN	Péter Beke
10	FW	HUN	Dávid Kovács (captain)
11	FW	HUN	Olivér Horváth
13	FW	HUN	Zoltán Vasvári
14	DF	HUN	Donát Horgosi
15	MF	HUN	Márió Németh
17	FW	HUN	Ronald Takács
18	FW	HUN	Krisztián Adorján

No.	Pos.	Nation	Player
19	FW	HUN	Patrik Tischler
20	DF	HUN	Márk Bíró
23	MF	HUN	Balázs Bakti
24	MF	HUN	István Soltész
26	DF	HUN	Márk Jagodics
27	GK	HUN	Bence Gundel-Takács
29	GK	HUN	András Horváth
33	DF	HUN	Olivér Kalmár
37	MF	HUN	Máté Fekete
48	DF	HUN	Dominik Fótyik
50	MF	HUN	Bálint Oláh
82	FW	HUN	Máté Sós
91	DF	HUN	Gergő Vaszicsku

== Transfers ==
=== Summer ===
In: Note: Flags indicate national team as defined under FIFA eligibility rules; some limited exceptions apply. Players may hold more than one non-FIFA nationality.

No.	Pos.	Nation	Player
8	MF	HUN	András Csonka (from Ferencváros)
11	FW	HUN	Olivér Horváth (from III. Kerület)
15	MF	HUN	Márió Németh (from DVTK)
19	FW	HUN	Patrik Tischler (from DVSC)
20	DF	HUN	Márk Bíró (from Újpest II)
21	FW	HUN	Zsolt Szűcs (from Szeged II)
27	GK	HUN	Bence Gundel-Takács (from Fehérvár)
29	GK	HUN	András Horváth (from Budapest Honvéd)
37	MF	HUN	Máté Fekete (from ESMTK)
50	MF	HUN	Bálint Oláh (from DVTK)
82	FW	HUN	Máté Sós (from Puskás Akadémia)

Out: Note: Flags indicate national team as defined under FIFA eligibility rules; some limited exceptions apply. Players may hold more than one non-FIFA nationality.

No.	Pos.	Nation	Player
11	MF	HUN	Miklós Micsinai (to Szeged)
15	FW	HUN	Dániel Szalai (to Békéscsaba)
19	FW	HUN	Marcell Papp (to DVTK)
21	FW	HUN	Bálint Farkas (to Érd)
20	FW	HUN	Ákos Zuigéber (loan return to MTK Budapest)
27	FW	HUN	Levente Szabó (loan return to Fehérvár)
37	DF	HUN	Máté Kotula (loan return to Mezőkövesd)
42	GK	HUN	Balázs Bese (loan return to MTK Budapest)
82	FW	HUN	Dávid László (loan return to Budapest Honvéd)
88	MF	HUN	Kornél Kulcsár (to Kozármisleny)

=== Winter ===
In: Note: Flags indicate national team as defined under FIFA eligibility rules; some limited exceptions apply. Players may hold more than one non-FIFA nationality.

No.	Pos.	Nation	Player
13	FW	HUN	Zoltán Vasvári (loan from MTK Budapest II)
23	MF	HUN	Balázs Bakti (loan from Puskás Akadémia)

Out: Note: Flags indicate national team as defined under FIFA eligibility rules; some limited exceptions apply. Players may hold more than one non-FIFA nationality.

No.	Pos.	Nation	Player
5	DF	CRO	Danijel Romić (to (Austria) Purkersdorf)
21	FW	HUN	Zsolt Szűcs (loan to Putnok)
99	FW	HUN	Donát Varga (loan return to Vasas)

== Competitions ==
=== Overview ===
Competition	First match	Last match	Starting round	Final position	Record							
Competition	First match	Last match	Starting round	Final position	Pld	W	D	L	GF	GA	GD	Win %
Nemzeti Bajnokság II	31 July 2022	21 May 2023	Matchday 1	10th	38	12	11	15	39	46	−7	31.58
Magyar Kupa	17 September 2022	3 May 2023	Round of 64	Runners-up	6	5	0	1	10	4	+6	83.33
Total					44	17	11	16	49	50	−1	38.64

Source: Competitions

=== Nemzeti Bajnokság II ===
==== League table ====
Pos	Team	Pld	W	D	L	GF	GA	GD	Pts
8	Siófok	38	15	11	12	45	51	−6	56
9	Haladás	38	14	9	15	54	56	−2	51
10	Budafok	38	12	11	15	39	46	−7	47
11	Tiszakécske	38	13	7	18	38	50	−12	46
12	Mosonmagyaróvár	38	12	10	16	36	44	−8	46

Source: Hungarian Football Federation (in Hungarian), Soccerway
Rules for classification: 1) Points; 2) Matches won; 3) Goal difference; 4) Goals scored; 5) Head-to-head points; 6) Head-to-head goal difference; 7) Fair play ranking; 8) Drawing of lots.

==== Results summary ====
Overall								Home						Away					
Pld	W	D	L	GF	GA	GD	Pts	W	D	L	GF	GA	GD	W	D	L	GF	GA	GD
38	12	11	15	39	46	−7	47	7	7	5	22	17	+5	5	4	10	17	29	−12

Source: Soccerway

==== Results by round ====
Round	1	2	3	4	5	6	7	8	9	10	11	12	13	14	15	16	17	18	19	20	21	22	23	24	25	26	27	28	29	30	31	32	33	34	35	36	37	38
Ground	A	H	A	H	A	H	A	H	A	A	H	A	H	A	H	A	H	A	H	H	A	H	A	H	A	H	A	H	H	A	H	A	H	A	H	A	H	A
Result	L	D	L	D	L	D	D	W	L	W	L	L	D	L	W	D	W	W	D	L	W	W	L	L	W	W	D	L	W	L	L	W	D	D	W	L	D	L
Position	19	16	18	20	20	20	20	17	19	17	18	18	19	19	18	17	17	15	15	17	15	11	12	13	11	10	9	10	9	10	11	11	11	12	10	10	10	10

Source: Matches
A = Away; H = Home; W = Win; D = Draw; L = Loss

==== Matches ====
31 July 2022 1	Ajka	3–0	Budafok	Ajka
19:00 CEST (UTC+2)	Sejben 16'; Szarka 35'; Gundel-Takács 43' (o.g.)	Report	Romić (yellow card) 12'; Sós (yellow card) 64'; Kovács (yellow card) 70'; Beke (yellow card) 75'	Stadium: Városi Stadion; Attendance: 1,700; Referee: Tamás Sipos

7 August 2022 2	Budafok	2–2	Pécs	Budapest
19:00 CEST (UTC+2)	Fótyik 15'; Horgosi 41'	Report	Tóth-Gábor 12'; Harsányi 58'	Stadium: Promontor utcai Stadion; Attendance: 500; Referee: Márió Görög

14 August 2022 3	Kazincbarcika	2–1	Budafok	Kazincbarcika
19:00 CEST (UTC+2)	Kállai 17', (yellow card) 70'; Pálinkás 84'; Szabó (yellow card) 89'; Süttő (yellow card) 90+2'	Report	O. Horváth (yellow card) 54'; Vaszicsku 87'	Stadium: Kolorcity Aréna; Attendance: 600; Referee: Bence Hanyecz

17 August 2022 4	Budafok	0–0	Gyirmót	Budapest
19:00 CEST (UTC+2)		Report		Stadium: Promontor utcai Stadion

21 August 2022 5	MTK Budapest	4–1	Budafok	Budapest
19:00 CEST (UTC+2)		Report		Stadium: Hidegkuti Nándor Stadion

28 August 2022 6	Budafok	1–1	Szentlőrinc	Budapest
17:30 CEST (UTC+2)		Report		Stadium: Promontor utcai Stadion

4 September 2022 7	Dorog	0–0	Budafok	Dorog
17:00 CEST (UTC+2)		Report		Stadium: Buzánszky Jenő Stadion

11 September 2022 8	Budafok	1–0	Békéscsaba	Budapest
16:00 CEST (UTC+2)		Report		Stadium: Promontor utcai Stadion

2 October 2022 9	Szeged	2–1	Budafok	Szeged
17:00 CEST (UTC+2)		Report		Stadium: Szent Gellért Fórum

5 October 2022 10	Mosonmagyaróvár	0–1	Budafok	Mosonmagyaróvár
15:00 CEST (UTC+2)		Report		Stadium: Wittmann Antal park

9 October 2022 11	Budafok	0–3	Kozármisleny	Budapest
15:00 CEST (UTC+2)	Sós 9'; Beke 13', (yellow card) 51'; Jagodics 68'	Report	Füredi (yellow card) 34'; Beke (yellow card) 86'	Stadium: Promontor utcai Stadion; Referee: Tibor Horváth
Note: Kozármisleny given the win, since an unauthorized player played for Budafok, as a ruling by MLSZ. The decision was subject to appeal.

16 October 2022 12	Diósgyőr	2–1	Budafok	Diósgyőr
15:00 CEST (UTC+2)	Bokros (yellow card) 36'; Gera 65', (yellow card) 74'; Csirmaz (yellow card) 85'; Szatmári (yellow card) 87'; Jurek 90+2', (yellow card) 90+3'	Report	Beke 27'; O. Horváth (yellow card) 33'; Györgyi (yellow card) 75'; Sós (red card) 77'; Jagodics (yellow card) 90+3'	Stadium: DVTK Stadion; Attendance: 2,612; Referee: Norbert Nagy
Note: Mátyus (yellow card) 79'

22 October 2022 13	Budafok	2–2	Csákvár	Budapest
13:00 CEST (UTC+2)		Report		Stadium: Promontor utcai Stadion

30 October 2022 14	Nyíregyháza	3–0	Budafok	Sényő
13:00 CET (UTC+1)		Report		Stadium: Sényő Sporttelep

6 November 2022 15	Budafok	2–1	Győr	Budapest
13:00 CET (UTC+1)		Report		Stadium: Promontor utcai Stadion

9 November 2022 16	Haladás	1–1	Budafok	Szombathely
17:00 CET (UTC+1)		Report		Stadium: Haladás Sportkomplexum

13 November 2022 17	Budafok	3–0	Siófok	Budapest
13:00 CET (UTC+1)		Report		Stadium: Promontor utcai Stadion

27 November 2022 18	Soroksár	1–2	Budafok	Budapest
13:00 CET (UTC+1)		Report		Stadium: Sporttelep Mihály Szamosi

4 December 2022 19	Budafok	1–1	Tiszakécske	Budapest
13:00 CET (UTC+1)		Report		Stadium: Promontor utcai Stadion

11 December 2022 20	Budafok	1–2	Ajka	Budapest
13:00 CET (UTC+1)		Report		Stadium: Promontor utcai Stadion

29 January 2023 21	Pécs	0–1	Budafok	Pécs
15:00 CET (UTC+1)		Report		Stadium: Stadion PMFC

5 February 2023 22	Budafok	4–0	Kazincbarcika	Budapest
14:00 CET (UTC+1)	Beke 28' (pen.), 46', 67'; Sós 75'	Report	Szekszárdi (yellow card) 62'	Stadium: Promontor utcai Stadion; Attendance: 250; Referee: Gergely Bana

12 February 2023 23	Gyirmót	2–1	Budafok	Győr
14:00 CET (UTC+1)	Madarász 17'; Medgyes 33'; Szegi (yellow card) 43'; M. Kovács (yellow card) 80'; Erdei (yellow card) 85'; Kichun (yellow card) 87'; Rusák (yellow card) 90+6'	Report	Adorján (yellow card) 33'; O. Horváth (yellow card) 40'; Fótyik 65', (yellow card) 85'; Gundel-Takács (yellow card) 85'; Jagodics (yellow card) 86'	Stadium: Ménfői úti Stadion; Attendance: 628; Referee: József Ducskai

19 February 2023 24	Budafok	0–1	MTK Budapest	Budapest
14:00 CET (UTC+1)	Adorján (yellow card) 14'	Report	Zuigéber 44'; Kata (yellow card) 68'; Bobál (yellow card) 90+9'	Stadium: Promontor utcai Stadion; Attendance: 500; Referee: Bence Hanyecz

26 February 2023 25	Szentlőrinc	1–2	Budafok	Szentlőrinc
14:00 CET (UTC+1)		Report		Stadium: Szentlőrinci Sporttelep

5 March 2023 26	Budafok	1–0	Dorog	Budapest
14:00 CET (UTC+1)		Report		Stadium: Promontor utcai Stadion

12 March 2023 27	Békéscsaba	2–2	Budafok	Békéscsaba
14:00 CET (UTC+1)		Report		Stadium: Kórház utcai Stadion

19 March 2023 28	Budafok	1–2	Szeged	Budapest
14:00 CET (UTC+1)		Report		Stadium: Promontor utcai Stadion

2 April 2023 29	Budafok	1–0	Mosonmagyaróvár	Budapest
16:00 CEST (UTC+2)		Report		Stadium: Promontor utcai Stadion

9 April 2023 30	Kozármisleny	2–0	Budafok	Kozármisleny
17:00 CEST (UTC+2)		Report		Stadium: Kozármislenyi Stadion

13 April 2023 31	Budafok	1–2	Diósgyőr	Budapest
18:00 CEST (UTC+2)		Report		Stadium: Promontor utcai Stadion

16 April 2023 32	Csákvár	0–1	Budafok	Csákvár
17:00 CEST (UTC+2)		Report		Stadium: Tersztyánszky Ödön Sportközpont

23 April 2023 33	Budafok	0–0	Nyíregyháza	Budapest
17:00 CEST (UTC+2)		Report		Stadium: Promontor utcai Stadion

26 April 2023 34	Győr	1–1	Budafok	Győr
15:00 CEST (UTC+2)	Deákovits (yellow card) 43'; Szendrei 81'; Be. Kiss (yellow card) 90+1'	Report	Adorján (yellow card) 31'; Kalmár (yellow card) 43'; Beke 46'; Fótyik (yellow card) 46'; Jagodics (yellow card) 90+1'	Stadium: ETO Park; Attendance: 150; Referee: Ákos Gaál

29 April 2023 35	Budafok	1–0	Haladás	Budapest
17:00 CEST (UTC+2)	Jagodics (yellow card) 37'; Csonka 51'	Report	Rácz (yellow card) 33'; Zvekanov (yellow card) 52'; Borvető (yellow card) 61'; Csilus (yellow card) 65'; Csernik (yellow card) 72'	Stadium: Promontor utcai Stadion; Attendance: 400; Referee: Tamás Nazsa

7 May 2023 36	Siófok	2–1	Budafok	Siófok
17:00 CEST (UTC+2)	Varjas 43', (yellow card) 87'; Szakály 56' (pen.)	Report	Nándori (yellow card) 21'; Fekete (yellow card) 42'; Fótyik (yellow card) 55'; O. Horváth 60'; Vaszicsku (yellow card) 77'	Stadium: Révész Street Stadium; Attendance: 200; Referee: Bence Hanyecz

14 May 2023 37	Budafok	0–0	Soroksár	Budapest
17:00 CEST (UTC+2)	Bíró (yellow card) 41'; Kalmár (yellow card) 75'; Oláh (yellow card) 88'	Report		Stadium: Promontor utcai Stadion; Attendance: 350; Referee: Tamás Múri

21 May 2023 38	Tiszakécske	1–0	Budafok	Tiszakécske
19:45 CEST (UTC+2)	Vólent (yellow card) 87', (goal) 90'	Report	Beke (yellow card) 37'	Stadium: Városi Stadion; Attendance: 350; Referee: Norbert Nagy

=== Magyar Kupa ===
17 September 2022 Round of 64	Bölcske	1–2	Budafok	Bölcske
15:00 CEST (UTC+2)	Rompos 87'	Report	Hajdók 3' (o.g.); Romić (yellow card) 36'; Beke 44'	Stadium: Bölcskei Sporttelep; Referee: Zoltán Maml

19 October 2022 Round of 32	Budafok	1–0 (a.e.t.)	Szeged	Budapest
13:30 CEST (UTC+2)	Németh (yellow card) 43'; Romić (yellow card) 81'; Soltész (yellow card) 103', (goal) 120'	Report	Kővári (yellow card) 51'; Szilágyi (yellow card) 120+1'	Stadium: Promontor utcai Stadion; Attendance: 100; Referee: Bence Hanyecz

8 February 2023 Round of 16	Iváncsa	1–2	Budafok	Iváncsa
13:00 CET (UTC+1)	Bányai 41'; Kercsó (yellow card) 84'; Jova (yellow card) 90+2'	Report	Beke (yellow card) 9', (goal) 81'; Gundel-Takács (yellow card) 29'; Jagodics 55'; Adorján (yellow card) 84'	Stadium: Károlyi István Sporttelep; Attendance: 400; Referee: Péter Zierkelbach

1 March 2023 Quarter-finals	Budafok	2–0	Kisvárda	Budapest
27:00 CET (UTC+1)	Nándori 10'; Soltész (yellow card) 16'; Adorján (yellow card) 27'; Beke 45'; Vasvári (yellow card) 90+1'	Report	Leoni (yellow card) 74'	Stadium: Promontor utcai Stadion; Attendance: 528; Referee: Márió Zimmermann
Note: Mátyus (yellow card) 90+1'

5 April 2023 Semi-finals	Budafok	3–0	Vasas	Budapest
20:00 CEST (UTC+2)	Soltész (yellow card) 10'; Beke 22', 34', 39'; Gundel-Takács (yellow card) 80'; Fótyik (yellow card) 84'	Report	Litauszki (yellow card) 5'; Ihrig-Farkas (yellow card) 84'	Stadium: Promontor utcai Stadion; Attendance: 2,450; Referee: Ádám Farkas

3 May 2023 Final	Budafok	0–2 (a.e.t.)	Zalaegerszeg	Budapest
19:30 CEST (UTC+2)	Beke (yellow card) 24'; Csonka (yellow card) 72'; Németh (yellow card) 111'; Jagodics (yellow card) 120+1'	Report	Huszti (yellow card) 93'; D. Németh 117'; Szendrei (yellow card) 120+1'; Szalay (yellow card) 120+1', (goal) 120+2'	Stadium: Puskás Aréna; Attendance: 24,152; Referee: István Vad

== Statistics ==
=== Appearances and goals ===
No.	Pos	Nat	Player	Total		Nemzeti Bajnokság II		Magyar Kupa	
No.	Pos	Nat	Player	Apps	Goals	Apps	Goals	Apps	Goals
1	GK	(Hungary) HUN	István Oroszi	3	0	2	0	1	0
3	DF	(Hungary) HUN	Andor Margitics	17	0	13	0	4	0
6	MF	(Hungary) HUN	Botond Nándori	22	1	18	0	4	1
7	FW	(Hungary) HUN	Arthur Györgyi	24	0	21	0	3	0
8	MF	(Hungary) HUN	András Csonka	35	1	31	1	4	0
9	FW	(Hungary) HUN	Péter Beke	36	21	31	15	5	6
10	FW	(Hungary) HUN	Dávid Kovács	36	2	31	2	5	0
11	FW	(Hungary) HUN	Olivér Horváth	43	1	37	1	6	0
13	FW	(Hungary) HUN	Zoltán Vasvári	10	0	9	0	1	0
14	DF	(Hungary) HUN	Donát Horgosi	17	1	14	1	3	0
15	MF	(Hungary) HUN	Márió Németh	38	1	32	1	6	0
17	FW	(Hungary) HUN	Ronald Takács	15	2	13	2	2	0
18	FW	(Hungary) HUN	Krisztián Adorján	40	2	36	2	4	0
19	FW	(Hungary) HUN	Patrik Tischler	24	1	21	1	3	0
20	DF	(Hungary) HUN	Márk Bíró	18	0	15	0	3	0
23	MF	(Hungary) HUN	Balázs Bakti	20	0	16	0	4	0
24	MF	(Hungary) HUN	István Soltész	37	2	32	1	5	1
26	DF	(Hungary) HUN	Márk Jagodics	35	4	30	3	5	1
27	GK	(Hungary) HUN	Bence Gundel-Takács	40	0	36	0	4	0
29	GK	(Hungary) HUN	András Horváth	1	0	0	0	1	0
33	DF	(Hungary) HUN	Olivér Kalmár	34	0	28	0	6	0
37	MF	(Hungary) HUN	Máté Fekete	5	0	4	0	1	0
48	DF	(Hungary) HUN	Dominik Fótyik	39	3	34	3	5	0
50	MF	(Hungary) HUN	Bálint Oláh	27	1	24	1	3	0
82	FW	(Hungary) HUN	Máté Sós	28	5	26	5	2	0
91	DF	(Hungary) HUN	Gergő Vaszicsku	27	1	23	1	4	0
Youth players:
16	MF	(Hungary) HUN	Attila Filkor	1	0	0	0	1	0
23	DF	(Hungary) HUN	Zoltán Forrai	0	0	0	0	0	0
42	FW	(Hungary) HUN	Samu Dala	1	0	1	0	0	0
51	FW	(Hungary) HUN	Benedek Horváth	1	0	1	0	0	0
52	DF	(Hungary) HUN	Gergely Szöllösi	0	0	0	0	0	0
88	MF	(Hungary) HUN	Bence Molnár	1	0	1	0	0	0
Players loaned out (for fall):
Players loaned out (for spring):
21	FW	(Hungary) HUN	Zsolt Szűcs	10	1	10	1	0	0
Players loaned out (for full season):
Players left the club (from summer):
Players left the club (from winter):
5	DF	(Croatia) CRO	Danijel Romić	8	0	6	0	2	0
99	FW	(Hungary) HUN	Donát Varga	6	0	5	0	1	0

=== Top scorers ===
Includes all competitive matches. The list is sorted by shirt number when total goals are equal.

Position	Nation	Number	Name	Nemzeti Bajnokság II	Magyar Kupa	Total
1	(Hungary)	9	Péter Beke	15	6	21
2	(Hungary)	82	Máté Sós	5	0	5
3	(Hungary)	26	Márk Jagodics	3	1	4
4	(Hungary)	48	Dominik Fótyik	3	0	3
5	(Hungary)	10	Dávid Kovács	2	0	2
5	(Hungary)	17	Ronald Takács	2	0	2
5	(Hungary)	18	Krisztián Adorján	2	0	2
5	(Hungary)	24	István Soltész	1	1	2
9	(Hungary)	6	Botond Nándori	0	1	1
9	(Hungary)	8	András Csonka	1	0	1
9	(Hungary)	11	Olivér Horváth	1	0	1
9	(Hungary)	14	Donát Horgosi	1	0	1
9	(Hungary)	15	Márió Németh	1	0	1
9	(Hungary)	19	Patrik Tischler	1	0	1
9	(Hungary)	21	Zsolt Szűcs	1	0	1
9	(Hungary)	50	Bálint Oláh	1	0	1
9	(Hungary)	91	Gergő Vaszicsku	1	0	1
/	/	/	Own Goals	1	1	2
			TOTALS	42	10	52

=== Hat-tricks ===
Player	Against	Result	Date	Competition	Round
(Hungary) Péter Beke	Kazincbarcika	4–0 (H)	5 February 2023	Nemzeti Bajnokság II	22
(Hungary) Péter Beke	Vasas	3–0 (H)	5 April 2023	Magyar Kupa	Semi-finals

=== Disciplinary record ===
Includes all competitive matches. Players with 1 card or more included only.

Position	Nation	Number	Name	Nemzeti Bajnokság II		Magyar Kupa		Total (Hu Total)	
Position	Nation	Number	Name	Yellow card	Red card	Yellow card	Red card	Yellow card	Red card
DF	(Hungary)	3	Andor Margitics	1	0	0	0	1 (1)	0 (0)
DF	(Croatia)	5	Danijel Romić	2	0	2	0	4 (2)	0 (0)
MF	(Hungary)	6	Botond Nándori	3	0	0	0	3 (3)	0 (0)
FW	(Hungary)	7	Arthur Györgyi	3	0	0	0	3 (3)	0 (0)
MF	(Hungary)	8	András Csonka	3	1	1	0	4 (3)	1 (1)
FW	(Hungary)	9	Péter Beke	6	1	2	0	8 (6)	1 (1)
FW	(Hungary)	10	Dávid Kovács	5	0	0	0	5 (5)	0 (0)
FW	(Hungary)	11	Olivér Horváth	3	0	0	0	3 (3)	0 (0)
FW	(Hungary)	13	Zoltán Vasvári	2	0	1	0	3 (2)	0 (0)
DF	(Hungary)	14	Donát Horgosi	4	0	0	0	4 (4)	0 (0)
MF	(Hungary)	15	Márió Németh	2	0	2	0	4 (2)	0 (0)
FW	(Hungary)	17	Ronald Takács	1	0	0	0	1 (1)	0 (0)
FW	(Hungary)	18	Krisztián Adorján	10	0	2	0	12 (10)	0 (0)
FW	(Hungary)	19	Patrik Tischler	1	0	0	0	1 (1)	0 (0)
DF	(Hungary)	20	Márk Bíró	2	0	0	0	2 (2)	0 (0)
MF	(Hungary)	23	Balázs Bakti	1	0	0	0	1 (1)	0 (0)
MF	(Hungary)	24	István Soltész	6	0	3	0	9 (6)	0 (0)
DF	(Hungary)	26	Márk Jagodics	10	1	1	0	11 (10)	1 (1)
GK	(Hungary)	27	Bence Gundel-Takács	1	0	2	0	3 (1)	0 (0)
DF	(Hungary)	33	Olivér Kalmár	5	0	0	0	5 (5)	0 (0)
MF	(Hungary)	37	Máté Fekete	1	0	0	0	1 (1)	0 (0)
DF	(Hungary)	48	Dominik Fótyik	7	0	1	0	8 (7)	0 (0)
MF	(Hungary)	50	Bálint Oláh	3	1	0	0	3 (3)	1 (1)
FW	(Hungary)	82	Máté Sós	4	1	0	0	4 (4)	1 (1)
DF	(Hungary)	91	Gergő Vaszicsku	3	0	0	0	3 (3)	0 (0)
			TOTALS	89	5	17	0	106 (89)	5 (5)

=== Clean sheets ===
Position	Nation	Number	Name	Nemzeti Bajnokság II	Magyar Kupa	Total
1	(Hungary)	27	Bence Gundel-Takács	13	2	15
2	(Hungary)	1	István Oroszi	1	0	1
2	(Hungary)	26	András Horváth	0	1	1
			TOTALS	14	3	17
