= 2022–23 Diósgyőri VTK season =

Diósgyőr
2022–23 season
- Chairman: Gergely Sántha
- Manager: Dragan Vukmir (until 24 August 2022); Serhiy Kuznetsov
- Stadium: DVTK Stadion
- Nemzeti Bajnokság II: 1st (promoted)
- Magyar Kupa: Round of 64
- Top goalscorer: League: Dániel Lukács (19); All: Dániel Lukács (19)
| Home colours | Away colours |

The 2022–23 season was Diósgyőri Vasgyárak Testgyakorló Köre's 55th competitive season, 2nd consecutive season in the Nemzeti Bajnokság II and 112nd year in existence as a football club. In addition to the domestic league, Diósgyőr participated in this season's editions of the Magyar Kupa.

== Transfers ==
=== Summer ===
In: Note: Flags indicate national team as defined under FIFA eligibility rules; some limited exceptions apply. Players may hold more than one non-FIFA nationality.

| No. | Pos. | Nation | Player |
|---|---|---|---|
| — | DF | SRB | Daniel Farkaš (from Mezőkövesd) |
| — | FW | HUN | Adrián Szőke (from (Netherlands) Heracles Almelo) |
| — | RW | HUN | Dániel Gera (from Ferencváros) |
| — | MF | HUN | Vladimir Koman (from (India) Chennaiyin) |
| — | DF | HUN | István Csirmaz (from Puskás Akadémia) |
| — | MF | HUN | Gergő Holdampf (from Szombathelyi Haladás) |
| — | DF | HUN | Ádám Viczián (from Vasas) |
| — | FW | HUN | Dániel Lukács (from Kecskemét) |
| — | MF | HUN | Ágoston Bényei (from Debreceni VSC) |
| — | DF | HUN | Szilárd Bokros (from Puskás Akadémia II) |
| — | LW | HUN | Marcell Papp (from Budafok) |
| — | MF | HUN | Benjámin Cseke (loan from Mezőkövesd) |
| — | MF | HUN | Márton Radics (loan from Puskás Akadémia) |
| — | DF | HUN | Máté Kotula (loan from Mezőkövesd) |
| — | DF | HUN | Botond Vajda (from Diósgyőr II) |
| — | FW | HUN | Gábor Makrai (loan return from Csákvár) |
| — | MF | HUN | Balázs Zsemlye (loan return from Pécs) |
| — | DF | HUN | Marcell Orosz (loan return from Debreceni EAC) |

Out: Note: Flags indicate national team as defined under FIFA eligibility rules; some limited exceptions apply. Players may hold more than one non-FIFA nationality.

| No. | Pos. | Nation | Player |
|---|---|---|---|
| — | FW | HUN | Gábor Molnár (to Mezőkövesd) |
| — | MF | HUN | Bálint Oláh (to Budafok) |
| — | FW | HUN | Zoltán Horváth (to Tiszakécske) |
| — | MF | HUN | Tamás Szeles (to Pécs) |
| — | DF | HUN | Kristóf Polgár (to Gyirmót) |
| — | MF | HUN | Márió Németh (to Budafok) |
| — | FW | HUN | Gábor Makrai (to Pécs) |
| — | FW | HUN | Richárd Zsolnai (to Ajka) |
| — | DF | HUN | Csaba Belényesi (to Kecskemét) |
| — | DF | HUN | Marcell Orosz (to Debreceni EAC) |
| — | FW | HUN | Marcell Hornyák (loan to Csákvár) |
| — | MF | HUN | Balázs Zsemlye (loan to (Slovakia) Slavoj Trebišov) |
| — | DF | HUN | Donát Orosz (loan to Eger) |
| — | MF | HUN | Tamás Kispál (loan to Eger) |
| — | DF | SRB | Dejan Karan (Retired) |
| — | DF | ISR | Rotem Keller (loan return to (Israel) Maccabi Netanya) |
| — | MF | HUN | Lucas (loan return to Kisvárda) |
| — | GK | HUN | Vilmos Borsos (loan return to Paks) |
| — | MF | HUN | Dominik Kocsis (loan return to Budapest Honvéd) |

== Competitions ==
=== Overview ===
| Competition | First match | Last match | Starting round | Final position | Record | | | | | | | |
| Competition | First match | Last match | Starting round | Final position | Pld | W | D | L | GF | GA | GD | Win % |
|---|---|---|---|---|---|---|---|---|---|---|---|---|
| Nemzeti Bajnokság II | 31 July 2022 | 21 May 2023 | Matchday 1 | Winners | 38 | 28 | 3 | 7 | 79 | 36 | +43 | 73.68 |
| Magyar Kupa | 17 September 2022 | 17 September 2022 | Round of 64 | Round of 64 | 1 | 0 | 0 | 1 | 0 | 1 | −1 | 0.00 |
| Total | | | | | 39 | 28 | 3 | 8 | 79 | 37 | +42 | 71.79 |

Source: Competitions

=== Nemzeti Bajnokság II ===
==== League table ====
| Pos | Team | Pld | W | D | L | GF | GA | GD | Pts | Promotion or relegation |
|---|---|---|---|---|---|---|---|---|---|---|
| 1 | Diósgyőr (C, P) | 38 | 28 | 3 | 7 | 79 | 36 | +43 | 87 | Promotion to Nemzeti Bajnokság I |
| 2 | MTK Budapest (P) | 38 | 22 | 8 | 8 | 86 | 48 | +38 | 74 | Promotion to Nemzeti Bajnokság I |
| 3 | Ajka | 38 | 20 | 8 | 10 | 54 | 37 | +17 | 68 | |
| 4 | Szeged | 38 | 18 | 10 | 10 | 50 | 38 | +12 | 64 | |
| 5 | Soroksár | 38 | 16 | 13 | 9 | 57 | 48 | +9 | 61 | |

Source: Hungarian Football Federation (in Hungarian), Soccerway
Rules for classification: 1) Points; 2) Matches won; 3) Goal difference; 4) Goals scored; 5) Head-to-head points; 6) Head-to-head goal difference; 7) Fair play ranking; 8) Drawing of lots.
(C) Champions; (P) Promoted

==== Results summary ====
| Overall | | | | | | | | Home | | | | | | Away | | | | | |
| Pld | W | D | L | GF | GA | GD | Pts | W | D | L | GF | GA | GD | W | D | L | GF | GA | GD |
|---|---|---|---|---|---|---|---|---|---|---|---|---|---|---|---|---|---|---|---|
| 38 | 28 | 3 | 7 | 79 | 36 | +43 | 87 | 15 | 2 | 2 | 41 | 17 | +24 | 13 | 1 | 5 | 38 | 19 | +19 |

Source: Soccerway

==== Results by round ====
| Round | 1 | 2 | 3 | 4 | 5 | 6 | 7 | 8 | 9 | 10 | 11 | 12 | 13 | 14 | 15 | 16 | 17 | 18 | 19 | 20 | 21 | 22 | 23 | 24 | 25 | 26 | 27 | 28 | 29 | 30 | 31 | 32 | 33 | 34 | 35 | 36 | 37 | 38 |
|---|---|---|---|---|---|---|---|---|---|---|---|---|---|---|---|---|---|---|---|---|---|---|---|---|---|---|---|---|---|---|---|---|---|---|---|---|---|---|
| Ground | A | H | A | H | A | H | A | H | A | H | A | H | A | H | A | A | H | A | H | H | A | H | A | H | A | H | A | H | A | H | A | H | A | H | H | A | H | A |
| Result | L | L | W | W | L | W | W | W | L | W | W | W | W | D | W | W | W | W | L | W | W | W | W | W | L | W | L | W | W | W | W | D | W | W | W | D | W | W |
| Position | 15 | 18 | 13 | 10 | 13 | 9 | 6 | 4 | 5 | 4 | 2 | 2 | 2 | 2 | 1 | 1 | 1 | 1 | 1 | 1 | 1 | 1 | 1 | 1 | 2 | 1 | 1 | 1 | 1 | 1 | 1 | 1 | 1 | 1 | 1 | 1 | 1 | 1 |

Source: Matches
A = Away; H = Home; W = Win; D = Draw; L = Loss

==== Matches ====
| 31 July 2022 1 | Siófok | 1–0 | Diósgyőr | Siófok |
| 19:00 CEST | Elek 21' | Report | | Stadium: Révész Géza utcai Stadion; Attendance: 1,600; Referee: Márió Görög |

| 8 August 2022 2 | Diósgyőr | 1–2 | Soroksár | Miskolc |
| 20:15 CEST | Szőke 77' | Report | Lőrinczy 36'; Hajdú 39' | Stadium: DVTK Stadion; Attendance: 3,180; Referee: Bence Csonka |

| 14 August 2022 3 | Tiszakécske | 1–2 | Diósgyőr | Siófok |
| 17:30 CEST | Vólent 75' | Report | Bényei 30', 46' | Stadium: Városi Stadion; Attendance: 700; Referee: Tibor Farkas |

| 17 August 2022 4 | Diósgyőr | 3–1 | Ajka | Miskolc |
| 19:00 CEST | Jurek 17'; Lukács 54', 61' | Report | Gaál 35' | Stadium: DVTK Stadion; Attendance: 2,818; Referee: Tamás Berényi |

| 22 August 2022 5 | Pécs | 4–3 | Diósgyőr | Pécs |
| 17:45 CEST | Tóth-Gábor 20' (pen.), 36'; Harsányi 24', 69' | Report | Farkaš 5'; Szőke 26'; Lukács 49'; Szatmári (red card) 20'; Oláh (red card) 75' | Stadium: Stadion PMFC; Attendance: 1,800; Referee: Péter Antal |

| 28 August 2022 6 | Diósgyőr | 1–0 | Kazincbarcika | Miskolc |
| 19:00 CEST | Koman 84' | Report | | Stadium: DVTK Stadion; Attendance: 5,061; Referee: József Ducsai |

| 5 September 2022 7 | Gyirmót | 1–2 | Diósgyőr | Győr |
| 20:15 CEST (UTC+2) | Polgár (yellow card) 12'; Nagy 44' (pen.); Csörgő (yellow card) 53'; Nagirnyi (yellow card) 90+3' | Report | Bokros (yellow card) 27'; Papp 34'; Cseke (yellow card) 76'; Szatmári (yellow card) 83'; Lukács (yellow card) 83'; Eppel 87' | Stadium: Ménfői úti Stadion; Attendance: 1,300; Referee: Péter Zierkelbach |

| 12 September 2022 8 | Diósgyőr | 3–0 | MTK Budapest | Miskolc |
| 20:00 CEST | Biben 44' (o.g.); Könyves 49', 67' | Report | | Stadium: DVTK Stadion; Attendance: 5,011; Referee: Sándor Andó-Szabó |

| 2 October 2022 9 | Szentlőrinc | 2–0 | Diósgyőr | Szentlőrinc |
| 15:00 CEST | Szabó 3' (pen.); Daróczi 27' | Report | | Stadium: Szentlőrinci Sporttelep; Attendance: 900; Referee: Zoltán J. Kovács |

| 5 October 2022 10 | Diósgyőr | 2–1 | Dorog | Miskolc |
| 18:00 CEST | Gyurácz 7' (o.g.); Lukács 90+5' | Report | Vígh 14' | Stadium: DVTK Stadion; Attendance: 2,085; Referee: Mihály Káprály |

| 9 October 2022 11 | Békéscsaba | 1–2 | Diósgyőr | Békéscsaba |
| 17:00 CEST | Czékus 86' | Report | Fazekas 61' (o.g.); Holdampf 74' | Stadium: Kórház utcai Stadion; Attendance: 1,228; Referee: Zoltán J. Kovács |

| 16 October 2022 12 | Diósgyőr | 2–1 | Budafok | Miskolc |
| 15:00 CEST (UTC+2) | Bokros (yellow card) 36'; Gera 65', (yellow card) 74'; Csirmaz (yellow card) 85'; Szatmári (yellow card) 87'; Jurek 90+2', (yellow card) 90+3' | Report | Beke 27'; O. Horváth (yellow card) 33'; Györgyi (yellow card) 75'; Sós (red card) 77'; Jagodics (yellow card) 90+3' | Stadium: DVTK Stadion; Attendance: 2,612; Referee: Norbert Nagy |
Note: Mátyus (yellow card) 79'

| 22 October 2022 13 | Mosonmagyaróvár | 0–3 | Diósgyőr | Mosonmagyaróvár |
| 13:00 CEST | | Report | Jurek 67'; Deak 80' (o.g.); Eppel 88' | Stadium: Wittmann Antal park Attendance: 600; Referee: Tamás Berényi |

| 30 October 2022 14 | Diósgyőr | 1–1 | Kozármisleny | Miskolc |
| 15:00 CET | Füredi 71' (o.g.) | Report | Bartha 87' | Stadium: DVTK Stadion; Attendance: 3,058; Referee: Tamás Nazsa |

| 6 November 2022 15 | Szeged | 0–3 | Diósgyőr | Szeged |
| 15:00 CET | | Report | Lukács 36' (pen.); Jurek 41'; Eppel 49' (pen.) | Stadium: Szent Gellért Fórum; Attendance: 3,271; Referee: Tamás Takács |

| 9 November 2022 16 | Csákvár | 0–3 | Diósgyőr | Csákvár |
| 13:00 CET | | Report | Jurek 15'; Szatmári 29'; Lukács 57' | Stadium: Tersztyánszky Ödön Sportközpont; Attendance: 300; Referee: József Ducsai |

| 13 November 2022 17 | Diósgyőr | 2–0 | Nyíregyháza | Miskolc |
| 15:00 CET | Gera 16'; Bényei 38' | Report | | Stadium: DVTK Stadion; Attendance: 7,340; Referee: Ádám Pillók |

| 27 November 2022 18 | Győr | 0–3 | Diósgyőr | Győr |
| 15:00 CET | Máté Tuboly (yellow card) 5'; Milán Papp (yellow card) 29'; Kiss (yellow card) 47'; Toma (yellow card) 55' | Report | Csirmaz 13'; Gera 43'; Szatmári (yellow card) 45+1'; Lukács 65' | Stadium: ETO Park; Referee: (Hungary) Sandor Ando-Szabo |

| 3 December 2022 19 | Diósgyőr | 1–2 | Haladás | Miskolc |
| 13:00 CET | Lukács 29'; Csirmaz (yellow card) 85' | Report | Mario Lucas Simut 19'; Rácz 75' (pen.); Áron Doktorics (yellow card) 82' | Stadium: DVTK Stadion; Referee: (Hungary) Gergő Bogár |

| 11 December 2022 20 | Diósgyőr | 3–1 | Siófok | Miskolc |
| 15:45 CET | Bényei 14' (yellow card) 69'; Eppel 34' (yellow card) 65'; Lukács 82' | Report | Nikházi 61' | Stadium: DVTK Stadion; Referee: (Hungary) Kovacs Imre |

| 29 January 2023 21 | Soroksár | 0–5 | Diósgyőr | Budapest |
| 13:00 CET | Erik Németh (yellow card) 57' | Report | Lukács 17' 59' 86'; Gera 23'; Bertus 50' | Stadium: Sporttelep Mihály Szamosi; Referee: (Hungary) Mario Görög |

| 6 February 2023 22 | Diósgyőr | 1–0 | Tiszakécske | Miskolc |
| 19:00 CET | Lukács 34' (pen.) | Report | Norbert Kiss (yellow card) 58' | Stadium: DVTK Stadion; Referee: (Hungary) Bence Csonka |

| 12 February 2023 23 | Ajka | 0–1 | Diósgyőr | Ajka |
| 15:00 CET | Kristóf Szűcs (yellow card) 45'; Szarka (yellow card) 82'; Zsolnai (yellow card) 85'; Richard Rabatin (yellow card) 88' | Report | Szatmári (yellow card) 8'; Bárdos 23'; Csirmaz (yellow card) 37'; Danilović (yellow card) 88' | Stadium: Stadium Városi; Referee: (Hungary) Tibor Horváth |

| 20 February 2023 24 | Diósgyőr | 3–2 | Pécs | Miskolc |
| 19:00 CET (UTC+1) | Bényei (yellow card) 20'; Bokros (yellow card) 31'; Lukács 40' (pen.); Eppel (yellow card) 41'; Könyves (yellow card) 62'; Lőrinczy 75'; Cseke 80'; Bárdos (red card) 81'; Danilović (yellow card) 90+3' | Report | Shvedyuk (yellow card) 39'; Kocsis 45+2'; Rácz (yellow card) 71'; Gera 90+3' | Stadium: DVTK Stadion; Attendance: 3,153; Referee: Imre Kovács |

| 26 February 2023 25 | Kazincbarcika | 1–0 | Diósgyőr | Kazincbarcika |
| 14:00 CET (UTC+1) | Kurdics 43'; Szekszárdi (yellow card) 54'; J. Nagy (yellow card) 88' | Report | | Stadium: Kolorcity Aréna; Attendance: 1,100; Referee: László Lovas |

| 6 March 2023 26 | Diósgyőr | 3–1 | Gyirmót | Miskolc |
| 19:00 CET (UTC+1) | Szatmári 41'; Obounet 61', 76'; Farkaš (yellow card) 64' | Report | Csörgő (yellow card) 22'; Szegi (yellow card) 30'; Soltész 51'; Berki (yellow card) 89' | Stadium: DVTK Stadion; Attendance: 2,492; Referee: Ádám Pillók |

| 13 March 2023 27 | MTK Budapest | 4–2 | Diósgyőr | Budapest |
| 19:00 CET (UTC+1) | Horváth 27'; Bognár 38'; Stieber 59' (pen.); Zuigéber 74', (yellow card) 79' | Report | Jurek 64', 87'; Farkaš (yellow card) 75'; Bokros (yellow card) 82' | Stadium: Hidegkuti Nándor Stadion; Attendance: 3,255; Referee: Dr Bence Csonka |

| 19 March 2023 28 | Diósgyőr | 5–1 | Szentlőrinc | Miskolc |
| 15:00 CET (UTC+1) | Cseke 30'; Lukács 48' (pen.); Bárdos 68'; Szatmári 76'; Lőrinczy 86'; Farkaš (yellow card) 90+2' | Report | Keresztes (yellow card) 25'; Erdélyi (red card) 59'; Havas (yellow card) 66'; László 90+4' (pen.) | Stadium: DVTK Stadion; Attendance: 2,678; Referee: Bence Hanyecz |

| 2 April 2023 29 | Dorog | 0–1 | Diósgyőr | Dorog |
| 16:00 CEST (UTC+2) | Hesz (yellow card) 12'; Király (yellow card) 30'; Kárász (yellow card) 84' | Report | Holdampf (yellow card) 33'; Lőrinczy 86'; Obounet (yellow card) 88' | Stadium: Buzánszky Jenő Stadion; Attendance: 500; Referee: Zoltán J. Kovács |

| 9 April 2023 30 | Diósgyőr | 1–0 | Békéscsaba | Miskolc |
| 16:30 CEST (UTC+2) | Csirmaz (yellow card) 27'; Holdampf (yellow card) 84'; Lukács 88'; Lőrinczy (yellow card) 90+1' | Report | Farkas (yellow card) 53'; Krnács (yellow card) 58'; Mikló (yellow card) 83' | Stadium: DVTK Stadion; Attendance: 3,872; Referee: Norbert Nagy |

| 13 April 2023 31 | Budafok | 1–2 | Diósgyőr | Budapest |
| 18:00 CEST (UTC+2) | Bíró (yellow card) 17'; Beke 66' | Report | Holdampf (yellow card) 15'; Bokros (yellow card) 23'; Jurek 73'; Lukács 90+1' | Stadium: Promontor utcai Stadion; Attendance: 650; Referee: Péter Zierkelbach |

| 17 April 2023 32 | Diósgyőr | 1–1 | Mosonmagyaróvár | Mosonmagyaróvár |
| 20:00 CEST (UTC+2) | Lukács (yellow card) 7'; Kuznetsov (yellow card) 63' (not on pitch); Jurek 77'; Koman (yellow card) 90' | Report | Pukhtyeyev (yellow card) 15'; Korbély (yellow card) 81'; Z. Nagy (yellow card) 89', (goal) 90'; Heinrich (yellow card) 90+2' | Stadium: Wittmann Antal park Attendance: 2,021; Referee: Ádám Pillók |

| 23 April 2023 33 | Kozármisleny | 2–3 | Diósgyőr | Kozármisleny |
| 17:00 CEST (UTC+2) | Vogyicska 52'; Beke (yellow card) 54'; Gránicz 76' (pen.) | Report | Bényei 43'; Cseke (yellow card) 55', (goal) 60'; Szatmári (yellow card) 74'; Medgyes 90' | Stadium: Kozármislenyi Stadion; Attendance: 1,000; Referee: Péter Antal |

| 26 April 2023 34 | Diósgyőr | 2–1 | Szeged | Miskolc |
| 18:00 CEST (UTC+2) | Bárdos 31'; Jurek 84' | Report | Géresi 5' (pen.) | Stadium: DVTK Stadion; Attendance: 3,030; Referee: Tamás Sipos |

| 30 April 2023 35 | Diósgyőr | 3–1 | Csákvár | Miskolc |
| 20:00 CEST (UTC+2) | Obounet 3'; Lukács 13'; Cseke 18' | Report | Vaskó 26'; Karacs (yellow card) 37'; Mészáros (yellow card) 74' | Stadium: DVTK Stadion; Attendance: 5,810; Referee: Marcell Derdák |

| 7 May 2023 36 | Nyíregyháza | 1–1 | Diósgyőr | Balmazújváros |
| 17:00 CEST (UTC+2) | Novák 55'; Vass (yellow card) 68'; Hegedüs (yellow card) 71' | Report | Koman (yellow card) 20'; Bárdos 88' | Stadium: Városi Sportpálya; Attendance: 1,500; Referee: Márió Görög |

| 14 May 2023 37 | Diósgyőr | 3–1 | Győr | Miskolc |
| 17:00 CEST (UTC+2) | Lőrinczy 55'; Obounet 64', (yellow card) 65'; Koman 80' | Report | Borsos 53'; Ruisz (yellow card) 57'; Csontos (yellow card) 70'; Tuboly (yellow card) 86' | Stadium: DVTK Stadion; Attendance: 12,606; Referee: Ádám Radványi |

| 21 May 2023 38 | Haladás | 0–2 | Diósgyőr | Szombathely |
| 17:00 CEST (UTC+2) | Devecseri (yellow card) 14'; Zvekanov (yellow card) 64' | Report | Lőrinczy 13'; Lukács 86' | Stadium: Haladás Sportkomplexum; Attendance: 1,263; Referee: Gergely Bana |

=== Magyar Kupa ===
| 17 September 2022 Round of 64 | Diósgyőr | 0–1 | Szeged | Miskolc |
| 16:00 CEST | Könyves (yellow card) 20' | Report | Kundrák 14', (yellow card) 90+2'; Tóth (yellow card) 22'; Farkas (yellow card) 60'; Jammeh (yellow card) 90' | Stadium: DVTK Stadion; Attendance: 2,951; Referee: József Erdős |

== Statistics ==
=== Appearances and goals ===
Last updated on 13 November 2022.

| No. | Pos | Nat | Player | Total | | Nemzeti Bajnokság II | | Magyar Kupa | |
| No. | Pos | Nat | Player | Apps | Goals | Apps | Goals | Apps | Goals |
|---|---|---|---|---|---|---|---|---|---|
| 1 | GK | (Hungary) HUN | Dániel Póser | 0 | 0 | 0 | -0 | 0 | -0 |
| 3 | DF | (Hungary) HUN | Csaba Szatmári | 17 | 1 | 16 | 1 | 1 | 0 |
| 4 | DF | (Hungary) HUN | Szilárd Bokros | 13 | 0 | 12 | 0 | 1 | 0 |
| 5 | DF | (Hungary) HUN | Máté Kotula | 1 | 0 | 1 | 0 | 0 | 0 |
| 6 | DF | (Hungary) HUN | Bence Bárdos | 18 | 0 | 17 | 0 | 1 | 0 |
| 7 | DF | (Hungary) HUN | István Csirmaz | 16 | 0 | 15 | 0 | 1 | 0 |
| 8 | MF | (Hungary) HUN | Lajos Bertus | 17 | 0 | 16 | 0 | 1 | 0 |
| 9 | FW | (Hungary) HUN | Márton Eppel | 18 | 3 | 17 | 3 | 1 | 0 |
| 10 | FW | (Hungary) HUN | Dániel Lukács | 18 | 6 | 17 | 6 | 1 | 0 |
| 11 | LW | (Hungary) HUN | Gábor Jurek | 15 | 5 | 15 | 5 | 0 | 0 |
| 17 | FW | (Hungary) HUN | Adrián Szőke | 15 | 2 | 14 | 2 | 1 | 0 |
| 20 | MF | (Hungary) HUN | Ágoston Bényei | 18 | 3 | 17 | 3 | 1 | 0 |
| 23 | MF | (Hungary) HUN | Vladimir Koman | 14 | 1 | 13 | 1 | 1 | 0 |
| 25 | MF | (Hungary) HUN | Gergő Holdampf | 16 | 1 | 15 | 1 | 1 | 0 |
| 26 | DF | (Hungary) HUN | Kornél Szűcs | 0 | 0 | 0 | 0 | 0 | 0 |
| 27 | DF | (Hungary) HUN | Botond Vajda | 4 | 0 | 4 | 0 | 0 | 0 |
| 33 | RW | (Hungary) HUN | Dániel Gera | 8 | 2 | 7 | 2 | 1 | 0 |
| 36 | DF | (Hungary) HUN | Ádám Viczián | 5 | 0 | 5 | 0 | 0 | 0 |
| 42 | FW | (Hungary) HUN | Norbert Könyves | 5 | 2 | 4 | 2 | 1 | 0 |
| 44 | GK | (Serbia) SRB | Branislav Danilović | 18 | -17 | 17 | -16 | 1 | -1 |
| 48 | MF | (Hungary) HUN | Márton Radics | 5 | 0 | 5 | 0 | 0 | 0 |
| 66 | MF | (Hungary) HUN | Bálint Illés | 2 | 0 | 2 | 0 | 0 | 0 |
| 68 | DF | (Hungary) HUN | János Hegedűs | 3 | 0 | 3 | 0 | 0 | 0 |
| 72 | DF | (Serbia) SRB | Daniel Farkaš | 8 | 1 | 8 | 1 | 0 | 0 |
| 94 | MF | (Hungary) HUN | Benjámin Cseke | 12 | 0 | 11 | 0 | 1 | 0 |
| 99 | LW | (Hungary) HUN | Marcell Papp | 10 | 1 | 9 | 1 | 1 | 0 |
Youth players:
| 18 | DF | (Hungary) HUN | Patrik Mrva | 0 | 0 | 0 | 0 | 0 | 0 |
| 22 | GK | (Hungary) HUN | Bogdán Bánhegyi | 0 | 0 | 0 | -0 | 0 | -0 |
| 78 | LW | (Hungary) HUN | Péter Benkő | 0 | 0 | 0 | 0 | 0 | 0 |
Out to loan:
Players no longer at the club:
| 5 | MF | (Hungary) HUN | Bálint Oláh | 3 | 0 | 3 | 0 | 0 | 0 |

=== Top scorers ===
Includes all competitive matches. The list is sorted by shirt number when total goals are equal.

Last updated on 13 November 2022

| Position | Nation | Number | Name | Nemzeti Bajnokság II | Magyar Kupa | Total |
|---|---|---|---|---|---|---|
| 1 | (Hungary) | 10 | Dániel Lukács | 6 | 0 | 6 |
| 2 | (Hungary) | 11 | Gábor Jurek | 5 | 0 | 5 |
| 3 | (Hungary) | 9 | Márton Eppel | 3 | 0 | 3 |
| 4 | (Hungary) | 20 | Ágoston Bényei | 3 | 0 | 3 |
| 5 | (Hungary) | 17 | Adrián Szőke | 2 | 0 | 2 |
| 6 | (Hungary) | 42 | Norbert Könyves | 2 | 0 | 2 |
| 7 | (Hungary) | 33 | Dániel Gera | 2 | 0 | 2 |
| 8 | (Serbia) | 72 | Daniel Farkaš | 1 | 0 | 1 |
| 9 | (Hungary) | 23 | Vladimir Koman | 1 | 0 | 1 |
| 10 | (Hungary) | 99 | Marcell Papp | 1 | 0 | 1 |
| 11 | (Hungary) | 25 | Gergő Holdampf | 1 | 0 | 1 |
| 12 | (Hungary) | 3 | Csaba Szatmári | 1 | 0 | 1 |
| / | / | / | Own Goals | 5 | 0 | 5 |
| | | | TOTALS | 33 | 0 | 33 |

=== Disciplinary record ===
Includes all competitive matches. Players with 1 card or more included only.

Last updated on 13 November 2022

| Position | Nation | Number | Name | Nemzeti Bajnokság II | | Magyar Kupa | | Total (Hu Total) | |
| Position | Nation | Number | Name | Yellow card | Red card | Yellow card | Red card | Yellow card | Red card |
| DF | (Hungary) | 3 | Csaba Szatmári | 3 | 1 | 0 | 0 | 3 (3) | 1 (1) |
| DF | (Hungary) | 4 | Szilárd Bokros | 2 | 0 | 0 | 0 | 2 (2) | 0 (0) |
| MF | (Hungary) | 5 | Bálint Oláh | 0 | 1 | 0 | 0 | 0 (0) | 1 (1) |
| DF | (Hungary) | 6 | Bence Bárdos | 2 | 0 | 0 | 0 | 2 (2) | 0 (0) |
| DF | (Hungary) | 7 | István Csirmaz | 4 | 0 | 0 | 0 | 4 (4) | 0 (0) |
| FW | (Hungary) | 10 | Dániel Lukács | 1 | 0 | 0 | 0 | 1 (1) | 0 (0) |
| FW | (Hungary) | 11 | Gábor Jurek | 4 | 0 | 0 | 0 | 4 (4) | 0 (0) |
| FW | (Hungary) | 17 | Adrián Szőke | 1 | 0 | 0 | 0 | 1 (1) | 0 (0) |
| MF | (Hungary) | 23 | Vladimir Koman | 1 | 0 | 0 | 0 | 1 (1) | 0 (0) |
| MF | (Hungary) | 25 | Gergő Holdampf | 2 | 0 | 0 | 0 | 2 (2) | 0 (0) |
| RW | (Hungary) | 33 | Dániel Gera | 2 | 0 | 0 | 0 | 2 (2) | 0 (0) |
| DF | (Hungary) | 36 | Ádám Viczián | 1 | 0 | 0 | 0 | 1 (1) | 0 (0) |
| FW | (Hungary) | 42 | Norbert Könyves | 0 | 0 | 1 | 0 | 1 (0) | 0 (0) |
| GK | (Serbia) | 44 | Branislav Danilović | 1 | 0 | 0 | 0 | 1 (1) | 0 (0) |
| DF | (Hungary) | 68 | János Hegedűs | 1 | 0 | 0 | 0 | 1 (1) | 0 (0) |
| DF | (Serbia) | 72 | Daniel Farkaš | 2 | 0 | 0 | 0 | 2 (2) | 0 (0) |
| MF | (Hungary) | 94 | Benjámin Cseke | 3 | 0 | 0 | 0 | 3 (3) | 0 (0) |
| LW | (Hungary) | 99 | Marcell Papp | 1 | 0 | 0 | 0 | 1 (1) | 0 (0) |
| | | | TOTALS | 31 | 2 | 1 | 0 | 32 (31) | 2 (2) |

=== Clean sheets ===
Last updated on 13 November 2022

| Position | Nation | Number | Name | Nemzeti Bajnokság II | Magyar Kupa | Total |
|---|---|---|---|---|---|---|
| 1 | (Serbia) | 44 | Branislav Danilović | 6 | 0 | 6 |
| 2 | (Hungary) | 1 | Dániel Póser | 0 | 0 | 0 |
| 3 | (Hungary) | 22 | Bogdán Bánhegyi | 0 | 0 | 0 |
| | | | TOTALS | 6 | 0 | 6 |
