= 2024–25 Zalaegerszegi TE season =

Zalaegerszeg
2024–25 season
- Chairman: Gábor Végh
- Manager: Gábor Márton (until 23 April 2025); István Mihalecz Jr. (from 23 April 2025)
- Stadium: ZTE Arena
- Nemzeti Bajnokság I: 10th
- Magyar Kupa: Semi-finals
- Top goalscorer: League: Gergely Mim (8); All: Gergely Mim (10)
- Highest home attendance: 6,451 v Ferencváros (12 April 2025, Nemzeti Bajnokság I)
- Lowest home attendance: 1,560 v Nyíregyháza (1 April 2025, Magyar Kupa)
- Average home league attendance: 2,959
- Biggest win: 4–0 v Hatvan (Away, 14 September 2024, Magyar Kupa)
- Biggest defeat: 1–3 v Debrecen (Away, 31 August 2024, Nemzeti Bajnokság I); 0–2 v Újpest (Home, 6 October 2024, Nemzeti Bajnokság I); 0–2 v Győr (Away, 23 February 2025, Nemzeti Bajnokság I); 0–2 v Ferencváros (Home, 12 April 2025, Nemzeti Bajnokság I)
Home colours	Away colours	Third colours

The 2024–25 season was Zalaegerszegi Torna Egylet's 42nd competitive season, 6th consecutive season in the Nemzeti Bajnokság I and 85th season in existence as a football club. In addition to the domestic league, Zalaegerszeg participated in that season's editions of the Magyar Kupa.

== Squad ==
Squad at end of season

Note: Flags indicate national team as defined under FIFA eligibility rules; some limited exceptions apply. Players may hold more than one non-FIFA nationality.

No.	Pos.	Nation	Player
GK	1	HUN	Bence Gundel-Takács
DF	2	HUN	Sebő Deme
DF	3	UKR	Oleksandr Safronov
DF	5	HUN	Bence Várkonyi
MF	6	HUN	Gergely Mim
MF	8	HUN	András Csonka
FW	9	HUN	Máté Sajbán
MF	10	FRA	Yohan Croizet
MF	11	HUN	Norbert Szendrei
MF	13	NGA	Anderson Esiti
DF	17	HUN	Vince Nyíri
MF	18	MNE	Bojan Sanković
FW	19	SVK	Ladislav Almási

No.	Pos.	Nation	Player
DF	21	HUN	Dániel Csóka
GK	22	HUN	Ervin Németh
DF	23	SVK	Sinan Medgyes
DF	24	BIH	Marko Čubrilo
MF	25	NGA	Jack Ipalibo
FW	27	HUN	Ábel Krajcsovics
DF	41	GRE	Stefanos Evangelou
GK	44	HUN	Martin Barbarics
DF	49	HUN	Bence Kiss
MF	67	HUN	Balázs Bakti
GK	89	HUN	Vilmos Borsos
FW	97	HUN	Dániel Németh
FW	99	HUN	Csanád Dénes

== Transfers ==
=== Transfers in ===
Transfer window	Pos.	No.	Player	From
Summer	GK	1	(Hungary) Bence Gundel-Takács	(Hungary) Budafok
Summer	DF	5	(Hungary) Bence Várkonyi	(Hungary) MTK
Summer	MF	8	(Hungary) András Csonka	(Hungary) Ferencváros
Summer	MF	10	(France) Yohan Croizet	Free agent (Note: Previous club Újpest.)
Summer	DF	13	(Hungary) Dominik Csontos	(Hungary) Győr
Summer	DF	17	(Hungary) Vince Nyíri	(Hungary) Haladás
Summer	DF	24	(Bosnia and Herzegovina) Marko Čubrilo	(Bosnia and Herzegovina) Igman Konjic
Summer	MF	25	(Nigeria) Jack Ipalibo	(Ukraine) Chornomorets Odesa
Summer	DF	41	(Greece) Stefanos Evangelou	(Croatia) Osijek
Summer	DF	49	(Hungary) Bence Kiss	(Hungary) Kecskemét
Summer	FW	99	(Hungary) Csanád Dénes	(Hungary) Siófok
Winter	DF	–	(Hungary) Benett Bagó	Youth team
Winter	FW	–	(Hungary) Botond Bazsika	Youth team
Winter	MF	13	(Nigeria) Anderson Esiti	(Hungary) Ferencváros
Winter	GK	89	(Hungary) Vilmos Borsos	Free agent (Note: Previous club Paks.)

=== Transfers out ===
Transfer window	Pos.	No.	Player	To
Summer	GK	–	(Hungary) Botond Gergely	(Romania) Csíkszereda Miercurea Ciuc
Summer	GK	–	(Hungary) Ágoston Kiss	(Hungary) Vasas
Summer	FW	–	(Hungary) László Papp	(Austria) Edelserpentin
Summer	GK	1	(Hungary) Dávid Dombó	Released
Summer	DF	4	(Croatia) Zoran Lesjak	(Slovenia) Nafta 1903
Summer	MF	8	(Hungary) István Soltész	(Hungary) Kisvárda
Summer	MF	14	(Hungary) Barnabás Kovács	(Hungary) Kecskemét
Summer	FW	19	(Croatia) Antonio Mance	(Qatar) Umm Salal
Summer	MF	23	(Israel) Guy Hadida	(Israel) Maccabi Bnei Reineh
Summer	MF	27	(Hungary) Bence Bedi	Released (Note: Joined Fehérvár.)
Summer	FW	29	(Nigeria) Philip Baloteli	Released
Summer	FW	70	(Nigeria) Meshack Ubochioma	Released (Note: Joined Dundee United.)
Summer	MF	71	(Hungary) Dominik Csóka	(Slovenia) Nafta 1903
Summer	GK	95	(Hungary) Márton Gyurján	Released (Note: Joined Szentlőrinc.)
Winter	DF	13	(Hungary) Dominik Csontos	(Hungary) Honvéd
Winter	FW	77	(Croatia) Josip Špoljarić	(Slovenia) Nafta 1903
Winter	FW	88	(Hungary) Balázs Vogyicska	(Hungary) Szeged

=== Loans in ===
Transfer window	Pos.	No.	Player	From	End date
Summer	FW	7	(Croatia) Kristian Fućak	(Croatia) Osijek	Middle of season
Summer	FW	27	(Hungary) Ábel Krajcsovics	(Hungary) Honvéd	End of season
Summer	MF	67	(Hungary) Balázs Bakti	(Hungary) Puskás Akadémia	End of season
Winter	FW	7	(Ghana) Owusu Kwabena	(Hungary) Ferencváros	Terminated loan
Winter	FW	19	(Slovakia) Ladislav Almási	(Czech Republic) Baník Ostrava	End of season

=== Loans out ===
Transfer window	Pos.	No.	Player	To	End date
Summer	DF	17	(Hungary) András Huszti	(Hungary) Fehérvár	End of season
Summer	GK	55	(Hungary) Zsombor Senkó	(Slovenia) Nafta 1903	End of season
Summer	MF	70	(Hungary) Csongor Papp	(Hungary) Szentlőrinc	End of season
Summer	FW	77	(Hungary) Szabolcs Szalay	(Slovenia) Nafta 1903	End of season
Summer	FW	80	(Hungary) Milán Klausz	(Slovenia) Nafta 1903	End of season

== Competitions ==
=== Overview ===
Competition	First match	Last match	Starting round	Final position	Record							
Competition	First match	Last match	Starting round	Final position	Pld	W	D	L	GF	GA	GD	Win %
Nemzeti Bajnokság I	26 July 2024	25 May 2025	Matchday 1	10th	33	7	13	13	35	42	−7	21.21
Magyar Kupa	14 September 2024	22 April 2025	Round of 64	Semi-finals	5	4	0	1	11	4	+7	80.00
Total					38	11	13	14	46	46	+0	28.95

Source: Competitions

=== Nemzeti Bajnokság I ===
==== League table ====
Pos	Team	Pld	W	D	L	GF	GA	GD	Pts	Qualification or relegation
8	Nyíregyháza	33	9	9	15	31	52	−21	36	
9	Debrecen	33	9	7	17	52	59	−7	34	
10	Zalaegerszeg	33	7	13	13	35	42	−7	34	
11	Fehérvár (R)	33	8	7	18	34	52	−18	31	Relegation to the Nemzeti Bajnokság II
12	Kecskemét (R)	33	4	13	16	31	53	−22	25	Relegation to the Nemzeti Bajnokság II

Source: Hungarian Football Federation (in Hungarian)
Rules for classification: 1) Points; 2) Matches won; 3) Goal difference; 4) Goals scored; 5) Head-to-head points; 6) Head-to-head goal difference; 7) Fair play ranking; 8) Drawing of lots.
(R) Relegated

==== Results summary ====
Overall								Home						Away					
Pld	W	D	L	GF	GA	GD	Pts	W	D	L	GF	GA	GD	W	D	L	GF	GA	GD
33	7	13	13	35	42	−7	34	5	7	5	18	18	0	2	6	8	17	24	−7

Source: Hungarian Football Federation

==== Results by round ====
Round	1	2	3	4	5	6	7	8	9	10	11	12	13	14	15	16	17	18	19	20	21	22	23	24	25	26	27	28	29	30	31	32	33
Ground	H	A	H	A	H	A	H	A	H	H	A	A	H	A	H	A	H	A	H	A	A	H	H	A	H	A	H	A	H	A	H	H	A
Result	L	L	W	D	D	L	W	L	L	L	D	D	W	D	L	L	W	L	W	W	L	D	D	L	D	W	L	L	D	D	D	D	D
Position	12	11	8	8	9	9	9	10	10	11	11	11	10	10	10	10	10	10	9	9	9	9	9	9	9	9	9	10	10	10	9	9	10
Points	0	0	3	4	5	5	8	8	8	8	9	10	13	14	14	14	17	17	20	23	23	24	25	25	26	29	29	29	30	31	32	33	34

Source: Matches
A = Away; H = Home; W = Win; D = Draw; L = Loss

==== Matches ====
26 July 2024 1	Zalaegerszeg	0–1	MTK	Zalaegerszeg
18:00 CEST (UTC+2)	Várkonyi (yellow card) 61'; Croizet (yellow card) 81'	Report	Antonov (yellow card) 56'; Jurina 90+2', (yellow card) 90+5'	Stadium: ZTE Arena; Attendance: 2,867; Referee: Mihály Káprály; Assistant referees: István Albert, Gergő Vígh-Tarsonyi; Fourth official: Ádám Pillók

4 August 2024 2	Puskás Akadémia	2–1	Zalaegerszeg	Felcsút
18:50 CEST (UTC+2)	Plšek 5'; Ormonde-Ottewill (yellow card) 37'; Szolnoki (yellow card) 50'; Maceiras (yellow card) 62'; Zsol. Nagy 90+1'	Report	Medgyes (yellow card) 47'; Sajbán 66'	Stadium: Pancho Aréna; Attendance: 1,321; Referee: Dr. Bence Csonka; Assistant referees: Gergő Vígh-Tarsonyi, Ádám Berényi; Fourth official: Péter Zierkelbach

10 August 2024 3	Zalaegerszeg	3–1	Paks	Zalaegerszeg
19:45 CEST (UTC+2)	Bakti 21', (yellow card) 50'; Mim 63'; D. Németh 69'	Report	Gyurkits (yellow card) 51'; Haraszti (yellow card) 77'; Kinyik (yellow card) 81'; Ötvös 83'	Stadium: ZTE Arena; Attendance: 2,379; Referee: Csaba Pintér; Assistant referees: Vencel Tóth II, István Szécsényi; Fourth official: Marcell Derdák

18 August 2024 4	Fehérvár	1–1	Zalaegerszeg	Székesfehérvár
15:30 CEST (UTC+2)	Spandler (yellow card) 37'; P. Kovács II 90+4'	Report	Dénes 54'	Stadium: Sóstói Stadion; Attendance: 2,763; Referee: Mihály Káprály; Assistant referees: Péter Kóbor, Dániel Szalai; Fourth official: Tamás Bognár

31 August 2024 6	Debrecen	3–1	Zalaegerszeg	Debrecen
17:45 CEST (UTC+2)	Dzsudzsák 54' (pen.); Szécsi (yellow card) 61'; Pëllumbi (yellow card) 63'; Ferenczi 65'; Domingues 90+6', (yellow card) 90+6'	Report	Dénes 5'; Sanković (yellow card) 21'; Safronov (yellow card) 52'; Szendrei (yellow card) 80'; Evangelou (yellow card) 87'	Stadium: Nagyerdei Stadion; Attendance: 5,072; Referee: Márton Rúsz; Assistant referees: Péter Garai, Zoltán Horváth; Fourth official: Marcell Derdák

21 September 2024 7	Zalaegerszeg	2–1	Kecskemét	Zalaegerszeg
14:30 CEST (UTC+2)	Sajbán 23'; Csóka 69'	Report	Lukács 34'; Ryashko (yellow card) 57'; Zeke (yellow card) 63'; Belényesi (yellow card) 73'	Stadium: ZTE Arena; Attendance: 2,567; Referee: Péter Zierkelbach; Assistant referees: Gergely Becséri, Dávid Rózsa; Fourth official: Marcell Derdák

28 September 2024 8	Diósgyőr	2–1	Zalaegerszeg	Miskolc
15:00 CEST (UTC+2)	Rakonjac 10'; Szatmári 69'	Report	Mim 54'	Stadium: Diósgyőri Stadion; Attendance: 4,107; Referee: Péter Antal; Assistant referees: Vencel Tóth II, Zoltán Horváth; Fourth official: Ádám Pillók

6 October 2024 9	Zalaegerszeg	0–2	Újpest	Zalaegerszeg
15:30 CEST (UTC+2)	Bakti (yellow card) 52'; Sanković (yellow card) 57'; Dénes (yellow card) 75'	Report	Brodić 7', (yellow card) 80'; Ljujić 17' (pen.); Kr. Horváth (yellow card) 57'; Tamás (yellow card) 71'; Duarte (yellow card) 75'	Stadium: ZTE Arena; Attendance: 4,974; Referee: Tamás Bognár; Assistant referees: Péter Kóbor, István Szécsényi; Fourth official: Péter Zierkelbach

20 October 2024 10	Zalaegerszeg	1–2	Győr	Zalaegerszeg
15:15 CEST (UTC+2)	Croizet 25'; Csóka (yellow card) 85'	Report	Bitri (yellow card) 39', (goal) 72'; Marku (yellow card) 50'; Bumba 82'; Štefulj (yellow card) 90+4'	Stadium: ZTE Arena; Attendance: 3,017; Referee: Imre Kovács; Assistant referees: Balázs Huszár, Péter Ország; Fourth official: Tamás Bognár

27 October 2024 11	Nyíregyháza	1–1	Zalaegerszeg	Nyíregyháza
13:00 CET (UTC+1)	Alaxai (yellow card) 65'; D. Nagy 90'; Keresztes (yellow card) 90+3'	Report	Evangelou (yellow card) 7'; Mim 15'; Safronov (yellow card) 37'	Stadium: Városi Stadion; Attendance: 5,822; Referee: Csaba Pintér; Assistant referees: Balázs Szalai, Dávid Rózsa; Fourth official: Márton Rúsz

2 November 2024 12	MTK	1–1	Zalaegerszeg	Budapest
12:30 CET (UTC+1)	I. Bognár (yellow card) 45'; Kosznovszky (yellow card) 69'; Németh 87'	Report	Croizet 10'; Evangelou (yellow card) 64'	Stadium: Hidegkuti Nándor Stadion; Attendance: 2,365; Referee: Péter Zierkelbach; Assistant referees: Balázs Szalai, Róbert Horváth; Fourth official: Csaba Pintér

9 November 2024 13	Zalaegerszeg	4–2	Puskás Akadémia	Zalaegerszeg
13:30 CET (UTC+1)	Mim 31'; Kiss 33', (yellow card) 86'; Croizet 37', 68'	Report	Stronati 41'; Favorov 74'; Maceiras (yellow card) 82'	Stadium: ZTE Arena; Attendance: 1,667; Referee: Gergő Bogár; Assistant referees: Balázs Huszár, Péter Ország; Fourth official: Marcell Derdák

24 November 2024 14	Paks	2–2	Zalaegerszeg	Paks
13:00 CET (UTC+1)	Osváth 40', (yellow card) 66'; Böde 82'	Report	Várkonyi (red card) 36'; Mim 45+1', 74'; Evangelou (yellow card) 77'	Stadium: Fehérvári úti Stadion; Attendance: 1,912; Referee: Péter Antal; Assistant referees: Norbert Bornemissza, István Szécsényi; Fourth official: Péter Zierkelbach

1 December 2024 15	Zalaegerszeg	0–1	Fehérvár	Zalaegerszeg
17:00 CET (UTC+1)	Kiss (yellow card) 39'; Szendrei (yellow card) 48'	Report	Spandler (yellow card) 22'; Huszti (yellow card) 39'; Melnyk 71'	Stadium: ZTE Arena; Attendance: 1,937; Referee: Mihály Káprály; Assistant referees: Georgiou Theodoros, Balázs Huszár; Fourth official: Tamás Bognár

8 December 2024 16	Ferencváros	1–0	Zalaegerszeg	Budapest
20:00 CET (UTC+1)	B. Varga 11'	Report		Stadium: Groupama Arena; Attendance: 6,897; Referee: Csaba Pintér; Assistant referees: Balázs Szert, Bence Péter Belicza; Fourth official: Ádám Pillók

14 December 2024 17	Zalaegerszeg	2–0	Debrecen	Zalaegerszeg
14:30 CET (UTC+1)	Mim 22', (yellow card) 23'; Várkonyi 81'; Bakti (yellow card) 83'	Report	Drešković 63'; Dzsudzsák (yellow card) 63'; Lagator (red card) 79'; Szécsi (yellow card) 85'; Kaye (yellow card) 90+3'; Megyeri (yellow card) 90+5'	Stadium: ZTE Arena; Attendance: 1,623; Referee: Péter Antal; Assistant referees: Zoltán Horváth, Dávid Rózsa; Fourth official: Péter Zierkelbach

2 February 2025 18	Kecskemét	1–0	Zalaegerszeg	Kecskemét
17:30 CET (UTC+1)	Berki (red card) 66'; Vágó (yellow card) 81'; Pálinkás 90+4' (pen.)	Report	Kiss (yellow card) 55'; Sanković (yellow card) 81'; Esiti (yellow card) 84'	Stadium: Széktói Stadion; Attendance: 2,563; Referee: Dr. Csonka Bence; Assistant referees: Dániel Szalai, Dávid Rózsa; Fourth official: Imre Kovács

5 February 2025 5	Zalaegerszeg	2–2	Ferencváros	Zalaegerszeg
19:30 CET (UTC+1)	Dénes 7', 35'; Csonka (yellow card) 65'; Evangelou (yellow card) 81'	Report	B. Varga 15', 25', (yellow card) 81'; Ćivić (yellow card) 41'	Stadium: ZTE Arena; Attendance: 3,087; Referee: Tamás Bognár; Assistant referees: Balázs Buzás, Balázs Szalai; Fourth official: Csaba Pintér

9 February 2025 19	Zalaegerszeg	2–1	Diósgyőr	Zalaegerszeg
15:30 CET (UTC+1)	Esiti (yellow card) 11'; Csonka (yellow card) 40'; Márton (manager) (yellow card) 45'; Szendrei (yellow card) 70'; Nyíri 72'; Várkonyi (yellow card) 81'; D. Németh 90+6'	Report	Bárdos 8'; Jurek (yellow card) 52'; Acolatse (yellow card) 67'; Rakonjac (yellow card) 82'	Stadium: ZTE Arena; Attendance: 2,177; Referee: Imre Kovács; Assistant referees: István Szécsényi, Zoltán Horváth; Fourth official: Csaba Pintér

16 February 2025 20	Újpest	1–2	Zalaegerszeg	Budapest
15:30 CET (UTC+1)	Karamoko 17'; Fiola (yellow card) 68'; Lacoux (red card) 75'; Kaczvinszki (yellow card) 82'	Report	Sanković (yellow card) 32'; Croizet (yellow card) 36'; Dénes 83'; Medgyes 90+4'; Almási (red card) 90+5'	Stadium: Szusza Ferenc Stadion; Attendance: 4,082; Referee: Gergő Bogár; Assistant referees: Dániel Szalai, Péter Ország; Fourth official: Tamás Bognár

23 February 2025 21	Győr	2–0	Zalaegerszeg	Győr
15:30 CET (UTC+1)	Várkonyi 41' (o.g.); Štefulj (yellow card) 46'; Ouro (yellow card) 80'; Benbouali 82'; Anton (yellow card) 82'	Report	Medgyes (red card) 44'	Stadium: ETO Park; Attendance: 2,670; Referee: Ferenc Karakó; Assistant referees: István Albert, Bence Péter Belicza; Fourth official: József Erdős

1 March 2025 22	Zalaegerszeg	0–0	Nyíregyháza	Zalaegerszeg
14:30 CET (UTC+1)	Evangelou (yellow card) 46'; Csóka (yellow card) 49'; Szendrei (yellow card) 56'	Report	Keita (yellow card) 58'; Benczenleitner (yellow card) 75'; Kovácsréti (yellow card) 76'; Kvekveskiri (yellow card) 90+2'	Stadium: ZTE Arena; Attendance: 2,358; Referee: József Erdős; Assistant referees: Dániel Szalai, József Aradi; Fourth official: Imre Kovács

8 March 2025 23	Zalaegerszeg	1–1	MTK	Zalaegerszeg
17:00 CET (UTC+1)	Croizet 3'; Bakti (yellow card) 54'; Nyíri (yellow card) 62'; Esiti (red card) 76'; Szendrei (yellow card) 85'; Evangelou (yellow card) 90+4'	Report	R. Molnár (yellow card) 40'; P. Kovács I (yellow card) 88'; Polievka 90+1'; Kata (yellow card) 90+3'	Stadium: ZTE Arena; Attendance: 2,616; Referee: Dr. Bence Csonka; Assistant referees: Péter Kóbor, István Szécsényi; Fourth official: Ádám Pillók

16 March 2025 24	Puskás Akadémia	2–1	Zalaegerszeg	Felcsút
19:30 CET (UTC+1)	Favorov (yellow card) 27'; Zsol. Nagy 62', (yellow card) 89'; Colley 78', (yellow card) 79'; Duarte (yellow card) 90+4'	Report	Golla 12' (o.g.); Csóka (yellow card) 51'; Kiss (red card) 90+2'	Stadium: Pancho Aréna; Attendance: 1,629; Referee: Ádám Pillók; Assistant referees: Balázs Szalai, Dániel Szalai; Fourth official: Márton Rúsz

29 March 2025 25	Zalaegerszeg	1–1	Paks	Zalaegerszeg
17:00 CET (UTC+1)	Szendrei (yellow card) 59'; Krajcsovics 81'; Evangelou (yellow card) 87'	Report	Lenzsér (yellow card) 24'; Könyves 28'; Hinora (yellow card) 54'; Ádám (yellow card) 70'; Ke. Horváth (yellow card) 86'	Stadium: ZTE Arena; Attendance: 2,366; Referee: Marcell Derdák; Assistant referees: Zoltán Horváth, Dávid Rózsa; Fourth official: Péter Zierkelbach

6 April 2025 26	Fehérvár	0–2	Zalaegerszeg	Székesfehérvár
14:00 CEST (UTC+2)	B. Szabó (yellow card) 54'; Šaponjić (yellow card) 57'	Report	Croizet 24', 55', (yellow card) 61'; Sanković (yellow card) 90+3'	Stadium: Sóstói Stadion; Attendance: 2,193; Referee: Gergő Bogár; Assistant referees: Zoltán Horváth, József Aradi; Fourth official: Péter Zierkelbach

12 April 2025 27	Zalaegerszeg	0–2	Ferencváros	Zalaegerszeg
19:45 CEST (UTC+2)	Csonka (yellow card) 45'	Report	Szalai (yellow card) 25', (goal) 79'; Gartenmann (yellow card) 58'; Saldanha 84'	Stadium: ZTE Arena; Attendance: 6,451; Referee: Csaba Pintér; Assistant referees: Norbert Bornemissza, Péter Ország; Fourth official: Marcell Derdák

19 April 2025 28	Debrecen	4–3	Zalaegerszeg	Debrecen
13:15 CEST (UTC+2)	Bárány 6'; T. Szűcs 52', (yellow card) 74'; Domingues (yellow card) 54', (goal) 88', 90+6'; Lang (yellow card) 63'	Report	Csonka (yellow card) 22'; Mim 25'; Krajcsovics 29'; Ipalibo 81'; Gundel-Takács (yellow card) 90+4'	Stadium: Nagyerdei Stadion; Attendance: 5,712; Referee: Péter Zierkelbach; Assistant referees: Georgiou Theodoros, Zoltán Horváth; Fourth official: Ádám Pillók

27 April 2025 29	Zalaegerszeg	0–0	Kecskemét	Zalaegerszeg
18:00 CEST (UTC+2)	Sanković (yellow card) 48'; Szendrei (yellow card) 55'	Report	L. Katona (yellow card) 77'; Bocskay (yellow card) 81'; Belényesi (yellow card) 88'	Stadium: ZTE Arena; Attendance: 2,985; Referee: Csaba Pintér; Assistant referees: Balázs Szert, József Aradi; Fourth official: Péter Zierkelbach

4 May 2025 30	Diósgyőr	1–1	Zalaegerszeg	Miskolc
13:30 CEST (UTC+2)	Rakonjac 59'; Holdampf (yellow card) 74'	Report	Esiti (yellow card) 72'; Ipalibo 80'; Krajcsovics (yellow card) 90'	Stadium: Diósgyőri Stadion; Attendance: 4,632; Referee: József Erdős; Assistant referees: Vencel Tóth II, Dániel Szalai; Fourth official: Péter Antal

11 May 2025 31	Zalaegerszeg	0–0	Újpest	Zalaegerszeg
13:00 CEST (UTC+2)	Kiss (yellow card) 33'; Sanković (yellow card) 58'; Esiti (yellow card) 90+1'	Report	Gergényi (yellow card) 49'; Lacoux (yellow card) 67'; Fiola (yellow card) 78'; Ljujić (red card) 81'	Stadium: ZTE Arena; Attendance: 3,780; Referee: Tamás Bognár; Assistant referees: István Szécsényi, Dániel Szalai; Fourth official: Csaba Pintér

17 May 2025 32	Zalaegerszeg	0–0	Győr	Zalaegerszeg
13:45 CEST (UTC+2)		Report	Vitális (yellow card) 68'; Benbouali (yellow card) 69'	Stadium: ZTE Arena; Attendance: 3,449; Referee: Péter Antal; Assistant referees: Balázs Huszár, Gergely Becséri; Fourth official: Imre Kovács

25 May 2025 33	Nyíregyháza	0–0	Zalaegerszeg	Nyíregyháza
14:15 CEST (UTC+2)	D. Nagy (yellow card) 32'; Korrea (yellow card) 36'; K. Kovács (yellow card) 70'; Eppel (yellow card) 73'; Alaxai (yellow card) 82'; Tamás (red card) 90'	Report	Sanković (yellow card) 58'; Csóka (yellow card) 73'; Esiti (yellow card) 80'; Szendrei (yellow card) 83'	Stadium: Városi Stadion; Attendance: 7,531; Referee: Márton Rúsz; Assistant referees: Péter Garai, Norbert Bornemissza; Fourth official: Ádám Pillók

=== Magyar Kupa ===
14 September 2024 Round of 64	Hatvan	0–4	Zalaegerszeg	Hatvan
15:00 CEST (UTC+2)		Report	Mim 5' (pen.); Ipalibo 11'; Evangelou (yellow card) 23'; Fućak 40'; Sanković (yellow card) 55'; Sajbán 65'	Stadium: Népkert Sporttelep; Attendance: 600; Referee: Márió Zimmermann; Assistant referees: Róbert Horváth, Péter Márkus

30 October 2024 Round of 32	Szentlőrinc	1–2	Zalaegerszeg	Szentlőrinc
12:30 CET (UTC+1)	Gelesh 31' (pen.); Tarcson (yellow card) 37'; Bíró (yellow card) 65'; Tamás (yellow card) 78'; Medgyesi (yellow card) 90+2'; Szekszárdi (yellow card) 90+2'	Report	Dénes (yellow card) 35'; Szendrei (yellow card) 61'; Márton (manager) (yellow card) 71'; Mim 71'; Croizet 85' (pen.), (yellow card) 90+2'	Stadium: Szentlőrinc SE Sporttelep; Attendance: 700; Referee: Tamás Sipos; Assistant referees: Gábor Máyer, Szabin Topálszki; Fourth official: Attila Szommer

26 February 2025 Round of 16	Karcag	1–2	Zalaegerszeg	Karcag
13:00 CET (UTC+1)	K. Szabó (yellow card) 42'; B. Varga (yellow card) 47'; Ádám (yellow card) 52'; Caba 77'	Report	Almási 34' (pen.); Nyíri (yellow card) 55'; Safronov (yellow card) 68'; Caba 86' (o.g.); Mim (yellow card) 90'	Stadium: Ligeti úti Sportcentrum; Attendance: 1,300; Referee: Mihály Káprály; Assistant referees: Georgiou Theodoros, Pál Vrbovszki; Fourth official: Tamás Takács

1 April 2025 Quarter-finals	Zalaegerszeg	2–0	Nyíregyháza	Zalaegerszeg
19:30 CEST (UTC+2)	Ipalibo 33', (yellow card) 52'; Várkonyi 67'	Report	Alaxai (yellow card) 13'; Keresztes (yellow card) 38'; Korrea (yellow card) 51'; Toma (yellow card) 87'	Stadium: ZTE Arena; Attendance: 1,560; Referee: József Erdős; Assistant referees: Georgiou Theodoros, Péter Ország; Fourth official: Dr. Bence Csonka

22 April 2025 Semi-finals	Paks	2–1	Zalaegerszeg	Paks
20:00 CEST (UTC+2)	Mezei 36'; Hinora (yellow card) 41'; Osváth (yellow card) 50'; Böde 83'	Report	Várkonyi (yellow card) 45'; Evangelou 90+1', (yellow card) 90+3'; Szendrei (yellow card) 90+3'	Stadium: Fehérvári úti Stadion; Attendance: 4,095; Referee: Gergő Bogár; Assistant referees: Norbert Bornemissza, Bence Péter Belicza; Fourth official: Márton Rúsz

== Statistics ==
=== Overall ===
Appearances (Apps) numbers are for appearances in competitive games only, including sub appearances.
Source: Competitions

No.	Player	Pos.	Nemzeti Bajnokság I				Magyar Kupa				Total			
No.	Player	Pos.	Apps	Goal	Booked	Sent off (straight red)	Apps	Goal	Booked	Sent off (straight red)	Apps	Goal	Booked	Sent off (straight red)
1	(Hungary) Bence Gundel-Takács	GK	29		1		2				31		1	
3	(Ukraine) Oleksandr Safronov	DF	17		2		4		1		21		3	
5	(Hungary) Bence Várkonyi	DF	28	1	2	2	5	1	1		33	2	3	2
6	(Hungary) Gergely Mim	MF	28	8	1		5	2	1		33	10	2	
7	(Croatia) Kristian Fućak	FW	7				2	1			9	1		
8	(Hungary) András Csonka	MF	22		4		4				26		4	
9	(Hungary) Máté Sajbán	FW	27	2			3	1			30	3		
10	(France) Yohan Croizet	MF	27	7	3		4	1	1		31	8	4	
11	(Hungary) Norbert Szendrei	MF	28		8		5		2		33		10	
13	(Hungary) Dominik Csontos	DF												
13	(Nigeria) Anderson Esiti	MF	10		5	1	1				11		5	1
16	(Hungary) Marcell Király	DF												
17	(Hungary) Vince Nyíri	DF	16	1	1		5		1		21	1	2	
18	(Montenegro) Bojan Sanković	MF	30		8		3		1		33		9	
19	(Slovakia) Ladislav Almási	FW	11			1	2	1			13	1		1
21	(Hungary) Dániel Csóka	DF	19	1	4		1				20	1	4	
22	(Hungary) Ervin Németh	GK	4				3				7			
23	(Slovakia) Sinan Medgyes	DF	24	1	1		4				28	1	1	
24	(Bosnia and Herzegovina) Marko Čubrilo	DF	1				2				3			
25	(Nigeria) Jack Ipalibo	MF	17	2			4	2	1		21	4	1	
27	(Hungary) Ábel Krajcsovics	FW	14	2	1		2				16	2	1	
29	(Hungary) Dániel Mulasics	MF												
33	(Hungary) Bence Bodrogi	DF												
41	(Greece) Stefanos Evangelou	DF	26		8		3	1	2		29	1	10	
44	(Hungary) Martin Barbarics	GK												
49	(Hungary) Bence Kiss	DF	28	1	4	1	4				32	1	4	1
59	(Hungary) Gergő Wolf	DF												
67	(Hungary) Balázs Bakti	MF	28	1	4		2				30	1	4	
71	(Hungary) Dominik Csóka	MF	1								1			
77	(Croatia) Josip Špoljarić	FW	6				2				8			
88	(Hungary) Balázs Vogyicska	FW	5				1				6			
89	(Hungary) Vilmos Borsos	GK												
97	(Hungary) Dániel Németh	FW	14	2			1				15	2		
99	(Hungary) Csanád Dénes	FW	32	5	1		4		1		36	5	2	
Own goals				1				1				2		
Totals				35	58	5		11	12			46	70	5

=== Clean sheets ===
			Clean sheets		
No.	Player	Games Played	Nemzeti Bajnokság I	Magyar Kupa	Total
1	(Hungary) Bence Gundel-Takács	31	7	1	8
22	(Hungary) Ervin Németh	7		1	1
44	(Hungary) Martin Barbarics				
89	(Hungary) Vilmos Borsos				
Totals			'7	2	9
