= Balázs Bakti =

Hungarian footballer (born 2004)

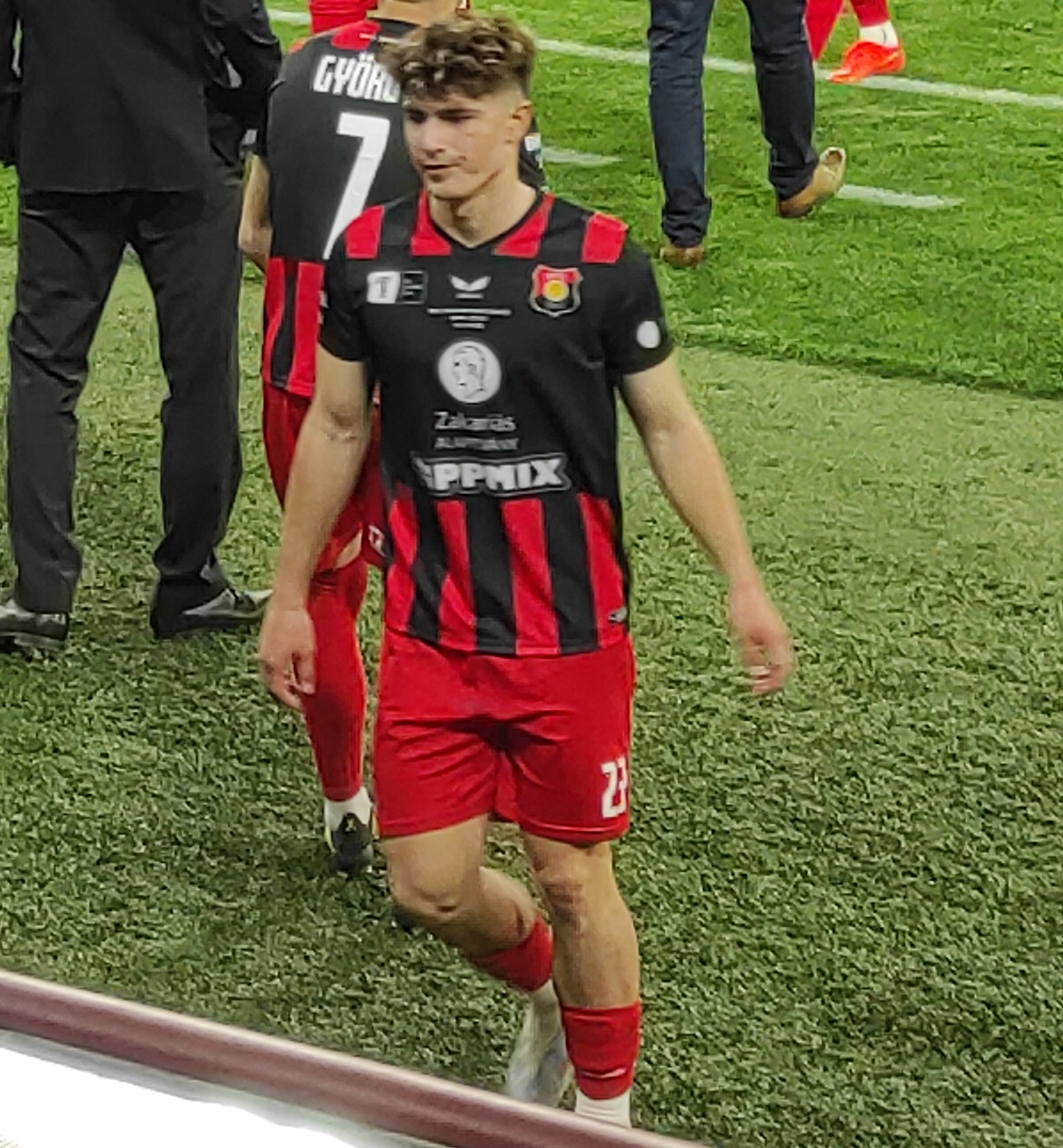
- Bakti with Budafok in 2023

Personal information
- Date of birth: 31 December 2004 (age 21)
- Place of birth: Budapest, Hungary
- Position: Midfielder

Team information
- Current team: Zalaegerszeg
- Number: 67

Youth career
- 2012–2013: Dalnoki Akadémia
- 2013: Vasas Akadémia
- 2013–2015: Mészöly Focisuli
- 2015–2022: Puskás Akadémia

Senior career*
Years	Team	Apps	(Gls)
2021–2022	Puskás Akadémia II	27	(4)
2021–2025	Puskás Akadémia	15	(0)
2023	→ Budafok (loan)	16	(0)
2023–2024	→ Vasas II (loan)	3	(0)
2023–2024	→ Vasas (loan)	29	(2)
2024–2025	→ Zalaegerszeg (loan)	28	(1)
2025–	Zalaegerszeg	12	(1)

International career^{‡}
2022–2023	Hungary U19	6	(0)
- * Club domestic league appearances and goals as of 19 January 2026 ‡ National team caps and goals as of 28 March 2023

Balázs Bakti (born 31 December 2004) is a Hungarian professional footballer, who plays as a midfielder for Nemzeti Bajnokság I club Zalaegerszeg.

== Career ==
On 24 June 2024, Bakti joined Nemzeti Bajnokság I side Zalaegerszeg on loan for the duration of the season. On 30 May 2025, he joined Zalaegerszeg permanently for an undisclosed fee.

== Career statistics ==
As of match played 21 September 2025

Appearances and goals by club, season and competition
Club	Season	League			Magyar Kupa		Europe		Total	
Club	Season	Division	Apps	Goals	Apps	Goals	Apps	Goals	Apps	Goals
Puskás Akadémia II	2020–21	Nemzeti Bajnokság III	1	0	—		—		1	0
Puskás Akadémia II	2021–22	Nemzeti Bajnokság III	18	3	—		—		18	3
Puskás Akadémia II	2022–23	Nemzeti Bajnokság III	8	1	—		—		8	1
Puskás Akadémia II	Total		27	4	—		—		27	4
Puskás Akadémia	2021–22	Nemzeti Bajnokság I	11	0	1	0	—		12	0
Puskás Akadémia	2022–23	Nemzeti Bajnokság I	4	0	0	0	1 (Note: Appearance in UEFA Europa Conference League)	0	5	0
Puskás Akadémia	Total		15	0	1	0	1	0	17	0
Budafok (loan)	2022–23	Nemzeti Bajnokság II	16	0	4	0	—		20	0
Vasas II (loan)	2023–24	Nemzeti Bajnokság III	3	0	—		—		3	0
Vasas (loan)	2023–24	Nemzeti Bajnokság II	29	2	1	0	—		30	2
Zalaegerszeg (loan)	2024–25	Nemzeti Bajnokság I	28	1	2	0	—		30	1
Zalaegerszeg	2025–26	Nemzeti Bajnokság I	6	0	0	0	—		6	0
Zalaegerszeg	Zalaegerszeg total		34	1	2	0	—		36	1
Career total			124	7	8	0	1	0	133	7

== Honours ==
Budafok

- Magyar Kupa runner-up: 2022–23
