= Krisztián Adorján =

Hungarian footballer (born 1993)

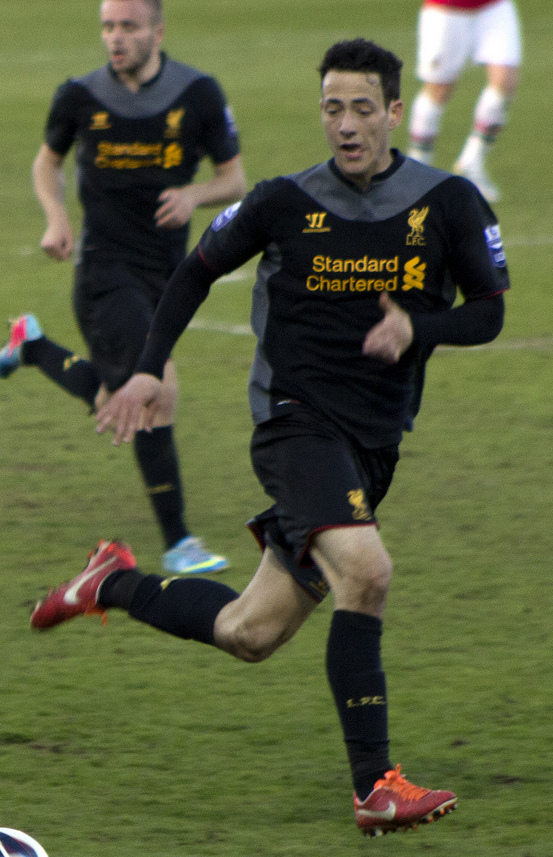
- Adorján playing for Liverpool under-21s in 2012

Personal information
- Full name: Krisztián Adorján Gábor
- Date of birth: 19 January 1993 (age 33)
- Place of birth: Budapest, Hungary
- Height: 1.84 m (6 ft 0 in)
- Positions: Attacking midfielder; winger

Youth career
- 2008-2009: MTK Budapest
- 2009–2013: Liverpool

Senior career*
Years	Team	Apps	(Gls)
2013–2014	Liverpool	0	(0)
2013–2014	→ Groningen (loan)	19	(3)
2014–2018	Novara	35	(2)
2017–2018	→ Partizani Tirana (loan)	9	(0)
2018	→ Dundalk (loan)	16	(3)
2018–2020	Virtus Entella	24	(0)
2021–2023	Budafok	65	(3)
2023–2024	Budapest Honvéd	29	(1)
Total		197	(12)

International career
2012	Hungary U19	4	(1)
2012–2014	Hungary U21	8	(3)
- * Club domestic league appearances and goals as of 21 December 2023

Krisztián Adorján Gábor (born 19 January 1993) is a Hungarian retired footballer who played as a forward or a winger.

== Club career ==
=== Early career ===
Adorján started his career with MTK Budapest before joining Liverpool in 2009.

=== Groningen ===
In the summer of 2013, it was officially announced that he was loaned out to Groningen, in the Eredivisie. He made his debut against NEC Nijmegen in a 4–1 win. He scored his first league goal against Go Ahead Eagles, on 25 August, which was the second goal. The match ended in a 3–3 away draw, where he received a red card in the 68th minute for an elbow. Adorján scored his second goal, the team's third, in injury time during a 4–1 win against RKC Waalwijk.

=== Novara Calcio ===
On 1 September 2014, Adorján joined Serie C club, Novara Calcio.

=== Dundalk ===
Adorján was announced as a loan signing for League of Ireland side Dundalk on 1 February 2018.

=== Budafok ===
On 25 August 2021, Adorján moved to the first Hungarian club of his professional career, Budafok.

== Career statistics ==
As of 12 June 2018

Appearances and goals by club, season and competition
Club	Season	League			National cup (Note: Includes KNVB Cup, Coppa Italia, Albanian Cup, FAI Cup, Hungarian Cup.)		League cup (Note: Includes League of Ireland Cup.)		Europe		Other		Total	
Club	Season	Division	Apps	Goals	Apps	Goals	Apps	Goals	Apps	Goals	Apps	Goals	Apps	Goals
Liverpool	2013–14	Premier League	0	0	0	0	0	0	0	0	–		0	0
FC Groningen (loan)	2013–14	Eredivisie	19	3	2	0	–		–		–		21	3
Novara	2014–15	Serie C	3	0	0	0	–		–		–		3	0
Novara	2015–16	Serie B	7	0	1	0	–		–		–		8	0
Novara	2016–17	Serie B	25	2	3	0	–		–		–		28	2
Novara	Total		35	2	4	0		0	0	0	0	0	39	2
Partizani Tirana (loan)	2017–18	Albanian Superliga	9	0	3	1	–		–		–		12	1
Dundalk (loan)	2018	League of Ireland Premier Division	13	2	1	0	1	0	0	0	0	0	15	2
Career total			76	7	10	0	1	0	0	0	0	0	87	7
