= Péter Beke (footballer, born 2001) =

Hungarian footballer

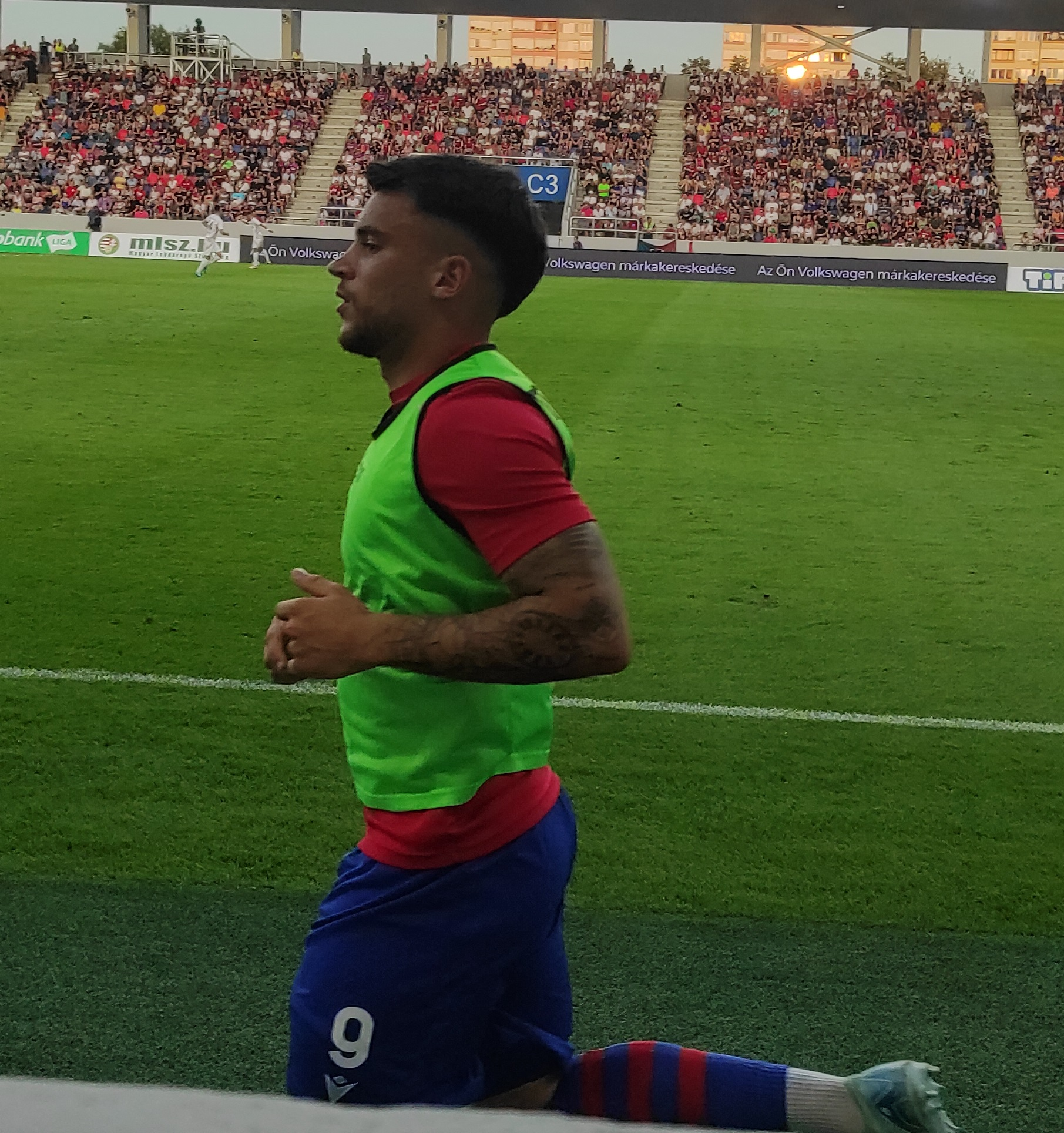
- Beke with Nyíregyháza in 2024

Personal information
- Date of birth: 14 March 2001 (age 25)
- Place of birth: Budapest, Hungary
- Height: 1.81 m (5 ft 11 in)
- Position: Forward

Team information
- Current team: Kecskemét (on loan from Nyíregyháza)
- Number: 14

Youth career
- 2008–2009: Bolha FTSE-Tárnok
- 2009–2012: Dalnoki Akadémia
- 2012–2017: Ferencváros
- 2017–2020: Hamburger SV

Senior career*
Years	Team	Apps	(Gls)
2020–2021	Hamburger SV II	7	(3)
2021–2022	Zalaegerszeg	0	(0)
2021–2022	Zalaegerszeg II	17	(6)
2022–2023	Budafok	42	(15)
2023–2024	Paks	4	(0)
2023	Paks II	2	(1)
2024–	Nyíregyháza	44	(10)
2024	Nyíregyháza II	1	(1)
2025–	→ Kecskemét (loan)	18	(6)

International career^{‡}
2015–2016	Hungary U15	6	(2)
2017	Hungary U16	11	(5)
2018	Hungary U17	9	(3)
2018–2019	Hungary U18	7	(4)
2019	Hungary U19	4	(3)
- * Club domestic league appearances and goals as of 31 May 2026 ‡ National team caps and goals as of 20:06, 27 April 2023 (UTC)

Péter Beke (born 14 March 2001) is a Hungarian professional footballer, who plays as a forward for Nemzeti Bajnokság II club Kecskemét, on loan from Nemzeti Bajnokság I club Nyíregyháza.

== Club career ==
Beke spent his early years in academies, such as Bolha Focitanoda, Dalnoki Akadémia, and Ferencváros. He signed with Hamburger SV in 2017, and stayed there for four years.

Beke returned to Hungary, to play in a Nemzeti Bajnokság I club Zalaegerszeg. On 26 January 2022, he signed with Budafok. The club reached the 2023 Magyar Kupa final with a hat-trick scored by him against Vasas. After the season, Paks signed the forward, to replace the previous season top scorer Barnabás Varga.

After making just four appearances for Paks, he agreed a move to NB2 side Nyíregyháza.

On 28 August 2025, Beke left on loan to Nemzeti Bajnokság II club Kecskemét with an option to buy.

== Career statistics ==
As of match played 28 September 2025

Appearances and goals by club, season and competition
Club	Season	League			National cup (Note: Includes Magyar Kupa)		Total	
Club	Season	Division	Apps	Goals	Apps	Goals	Apps	Goals
Hamburger SV II	2019–20	Regionalliga Nord	0	0	—		0	0
Hamburger SV II	2020–21	Regionalliga Nord	7	3	—		7	3
Hamburger SV II	Total		7	3	—		7	3
Zalaegerszeg	2021–22	Nemzeti Bajnokság I	0	0	—		0	0
Zalaegerszeg II	2021–22	Nemzeti Bajnokság III	17	6	—		17	6
Budafok	2021–22	Nemzeti Bajnokság II	11	0	—		11	0
Budafok	2022–23	Nemzeti Bajnokság II	31	15	5	6	36	21
Budafok	Total		42	15	5	6	47	21
Paks	2023–24	Nemzeti Bajnokság I	4	0	2	3	6	3
Paks II	2023–24	Nemzeti Bajnokság III	2	1	—		2	1
Nyíregyháza	2023–24	Nemzeti Bajnokság II	16	4	3	1	19	5
Nyíregyháza	2024–25	Nemzeti Bajnokság I	25	6	2	0	27	6
Nyíregyháza	2025–26	Nemzeti Bajnokság I	3	0	—		3	0
Nyíregyháza	Total		44	10	5	1	49	11
Nyíregyháza II	2024–25	Nemzeti Bajnokság III	1	1	—		1	1
Kecskemét (loan)	2025–26	Nemzeti Bajnokság II	3	2	1	0	4	2
Career total			120	38	12	10	133	48

== Honours ==
Budafok

- Magyar Kupa runner-up: 2022–23

Paks

- Magyar Kupa: 2023–24

Nyíregyháza

- Nemzeti Bajnokság II: 2023–24
