= Máté Fekete =

Hungarian footballer (born 1995)

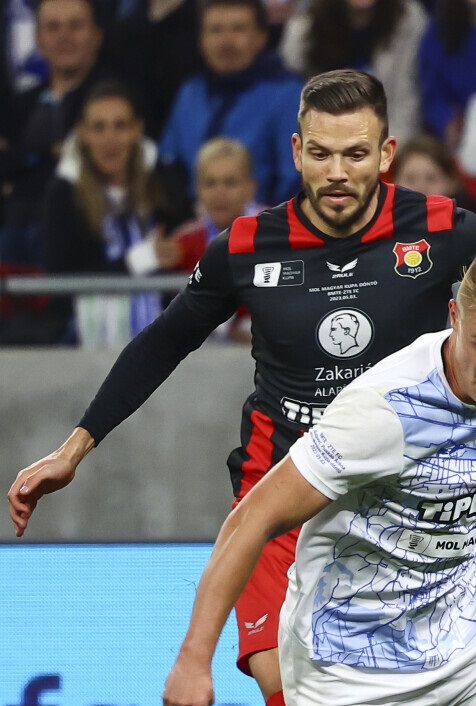
- Fekete playing for Budafok in 2023

Personal information
- Date of birth: 22 August 1995 (age 31)
- Place of birth: Budapest, Hungary
- Height: 1.84 m (6 ft 0 in)
- Position: Right midfielder

Team information
- Current team: Budafok
- Number: 37

Youth career
- 2002–2015: Budafok

Senior career*
Years	Team	Apps	(Gls)
2015–	Budafok	189	(27)
2022	→ ESMTK (loan)	15	(0)
- * Club domestic league appearances and goals as of 31 May 2026

Máté Fekete (born 22 August 1995) is a Hungarian professional footballer who plays as a midfielder for Nemzeti Bajnokság II club Budafok.

== Career statistics ==
As of 15 May 2021

Appearances and goals by club, season and competition
Club	Season	League			Cup		Continental		Other		Total	
Club	Season	Division	Apps	Goals	Apps	Goals	Apps	Goals	Apps	Goals	Apps	Goals
Budafok	2010–11	Nemzeti Bajnokság III	2	0	1	0	—		—		3	0
Budafok	2011–12	Nemzeti Bajnokság III	4	1	0	0	—		—		4	1
Budafok	2012–13	Nemzeti Bajnokság III	25	0	1	0	—		—		26	0
Budafok	2013–14	Megyei Bajnokság I	25	11	2	0	—		—		27	11
Budafok	2014–15	Megyei Bajnokság I	24	13	4	1	—		2	0	28	14
Budafok	2015–16	Nemzeti Bajnokság III	13	0	1	0	—		—		14	0
Budafok	2016–17	Nemzeti Bajnokság III	11	0	6	0	—		—		17	0
Budafok	2017–18	Nemzeti Bajnokság II	18	2	3	1	—		—		21	3
Budafok	2018–19	Nemzeti Bajnokság II	12	0	2	1	—		—		14	1
Budafok	2019–20	Nemzeti Bajnokság II	2	0	1	0	—		—		3	0
Budafok	2020–21	Nemzeti Bajnokság I	4	0	3	0	—		—		7	0
Budafok	Total		140	26	24	3	0	0	0	0	164	30
Career total			140	26	24	3	0	0	0	0	164	30
