= Attila Lőrinczy =

Hungarian footballer (born 1994)

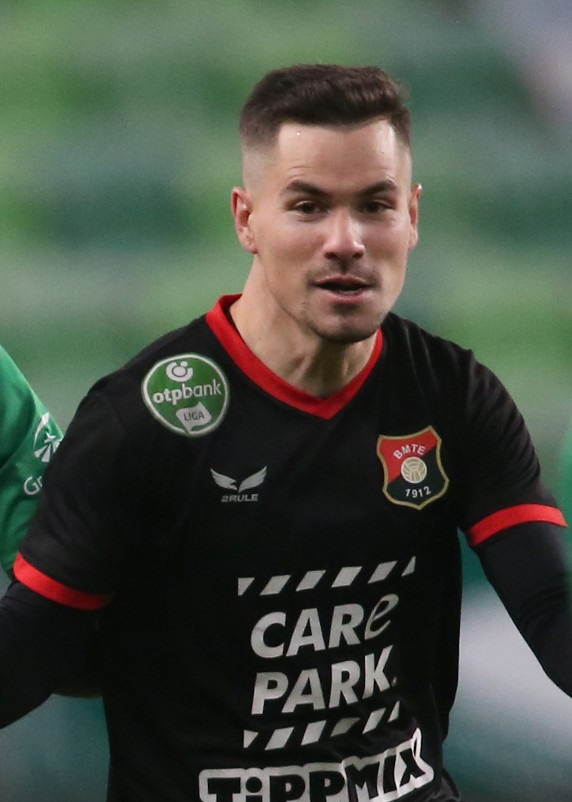
- Lőrinczy playing for Budafok in 2020

Personal information
- Date of birth: 8 April 1994 (age 32)
- Place of birth: Budapest, Hungary
- Height: 1.76 m (5 ft 9 1/2 in)
- Position: Left winger

Team information
- Current team: Mezőkövesd
- Number: 10

Youth career
- 2001–2002: Ferencváros
- 2002–2003: Újpest
- 2003–2008: Vác
- 2010–2012: Budapest Honvéd

Senior career*
Years	Team	Apps	(Gls)
2012–2017	Budapest Honvéd	7	(1)
2012–2017	→ Budapest Honvéd II	49	(13)
2014	→ Békéscsaba (loan)	9	(0)
2016	→ Szolnok (loan)	13	(0)
2016–2017	→ Ajka	29	(9)
2017–2018	Mosonmagyaróvár	37	(4)
2018–2020	Soroksár	60	(15)
2020–2021	Budafok	19	(0)
2021–2023	Soroksár	54	(18)
2023	Diósgyőr	18	(5)
2023–2024	Budapest Honvéd	37	(6)
2025–	Mezőkövesd	36	(6)

International career
2010–2011	Hungary U17	1	(0)
2010–2011	Hungary U18	3	(0)
2011–2012	Hungary U19	5	(1)
2014–2015	Hungary U21	3	(0)
- * Club domestic league appearances and goals as of 31 May 2026

Attila Lőrinczy (born 8 April 1994) is a Hungarian football player who plays for Mezőkövesd.

== Career ==
On 16 December 2022, Lőrinczy signed a contract with Diósgyőr.

== Career statistics ==
Appearances and goals by club, season and competition
Club	Season	League			Cup		League Cup		Europe		Total	
Club	Season	Division	Apps	Goals	Apps	Goals	Apps	Goals	Apps	Goals	Apps	Goals
Budapest Honvéd
Budapest Honvéd	2011–12	Nemzeti Bajnokság I	0	0	1	0	0	0	0	0	1	0
Budapest Honvéd	2012–13	Nemzeti Bajnokság I	1	0	0	0	0	0	0	0	1	0
Budapest Honvéd	2013–14	Nemzeti Bajnokság I	5	1	1	0	2	0	0	0	8	1
Budapest Honvéd	2014–15	Nemzeti Bajnokság I	1	0	0	0	0	0	0	0	1	0
Budapest Honvéd	2015–16	Nemzeti Bajnokság I	0	0	2	0	—		0	0	2	0
Budapest Honvéd	Total		7	1	4	0	2	0	0	0	13	1
Budapest Honvéd II
Budapest Honvéd II	2011–12	Nemzeti Bajnokság II	2	0	—		—		—		2	0
Budapest Honvéd II	2012–13	Nemzeti Bajnokság II	10	2	—		—		—		10	2
Budapest Honvéd II	2013–14	Nemzeti Bajnokság III	20	3	—		—		—		20	3
Budapest Honvéd II	2014–15	Nemzeti Bajnokság III	6	3	—		—		—		6	3
Budapest Honvéd II	2015–16	Nemzeti Bajnokság I	11	5	—		—		—		11	5
Budapest Honvéd II	Total		49	13	0	0	0	0	0	0	49	13
Békéscsaba	2014–15	Nemzeti Bajnokság II	9	0	3	0	7	1	0	0	19	1
Szolnok	2015–16	Nemzeti Bajnokság II	13	0	0	0	—		—		13	0
Ajka	2016–17	Nemzeti Bajnokság III	29	9	0	0	—		—		29	9
Mosonmagyaróvár	2017–18	Nemzeti Bajnokság II	37	4	0	0	—		—		37	4
Soroksár
Soroksár	2018–19	Nemzeti Bajnokság II	37	8	8	2	—		—		45	10
Soroksár	2019–20	Nemzeti Bajnokság II	23	7	1	0	—		—		24	7
Soroksár	Total		60	15	9	2	0	0	0	0	69	17
Budafok	2020–21	Nemzeti Bajnokság I	19	0	1	1	—		—		20	1
Career total			223	42	17	3	9	1	0	0	249	46

Updated to games played as of 15 May 2021.
