= Bence Kiss =

Hungarian footballer (born 1999)

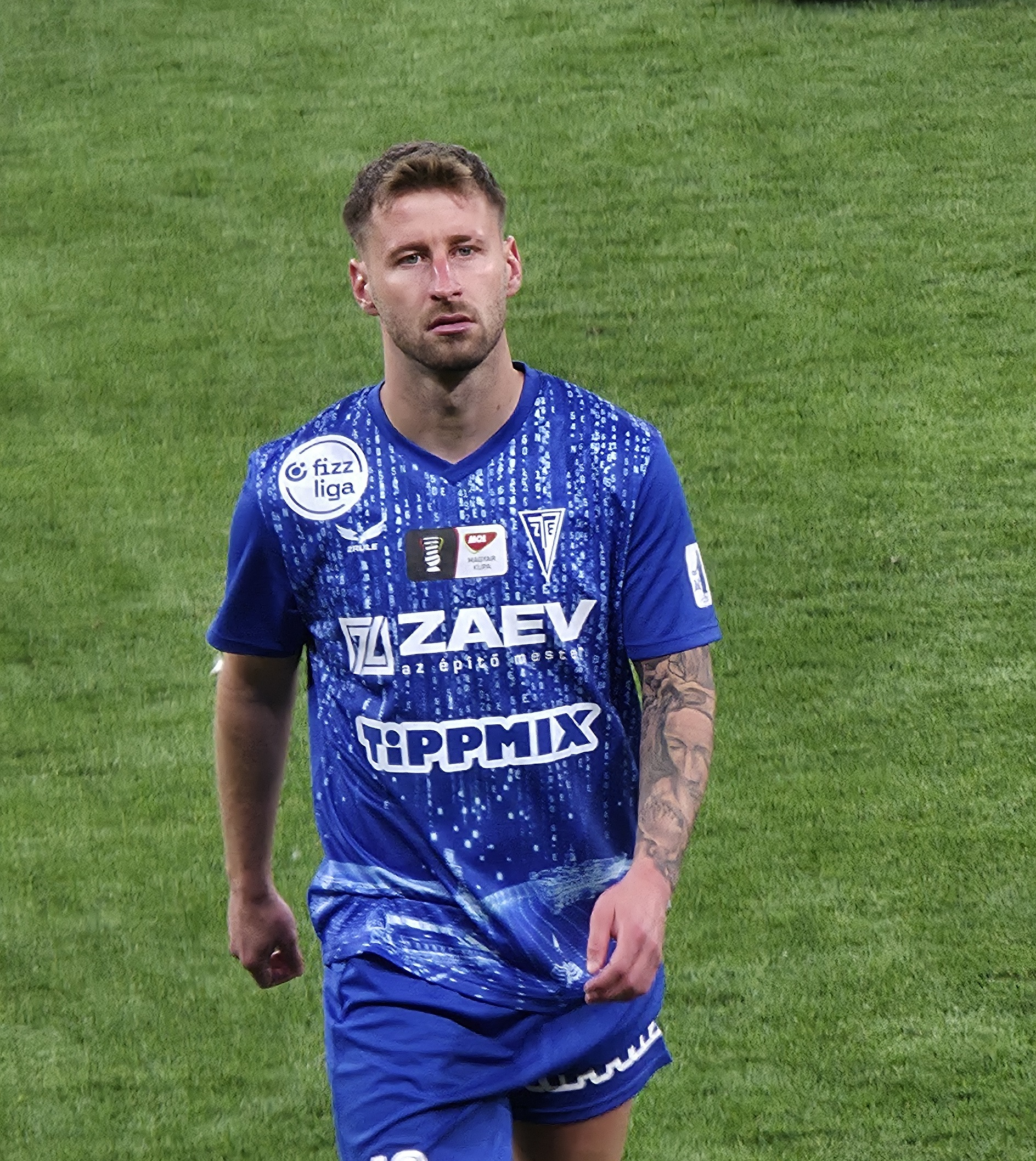
- Kiss with Zalaegerszeg in 2026

Personal information
- Full name: Bence András Kiss
- Date of birth: 1 July 1999 (age 27)
- Place of birth: Celldömölk, Hungary
- Height: 1.80 m (5 ft 11 in)
- Position: Midfielder

Team information
- Current team: Zalaegerszeg
- Number: 49

Senior career*
Years	Team	Apps	(Gls)
2016–2022	Haladás	119	(8)
2018–2019	→ Kazincbarcika (loan)	32	(0)
2018	→ Bánhorváti-Kazincbarcika (loan)	1	(0)
2022–2023	Győr	35	(0)
2023–2024	Kecskemét	10	(0)
2023	Kecskemét II	1	(0)
2024–	Zalaegerszeg	75	(7)

International career^{‡}
2015	Hungary U15	2	(1)
2016	Hungary U16	8	(1)
2015–2016	Hungary U17	4	(0)
2017	Hungary U18	5	(0)
2017–2018	Hungary U19	4	(0)
2019–2020	Hungary U21	5	(0)
- * Club domestic league appearances and goals as of 30 May 2026 ‡ National team caps and goals as of 7 September 2020

Bence András Kiss (born 1 July 1999) is a Hungarian footballer who plays as midfielder for Zalaegerszeg.

== Club career ==
On 21 June 2022, Kiss signed a one-year contract with Győr. On 13 June 2023, Kiss signed to Kecskemét.

On 14 January 2024, Kiss moved to Zalaegerszeg.

== Career statistics ==
As of match played 14 December 2024

Appearances and goals by club, season and competition
Club	Season	League			National cup (Note: Includes Magyar Kupa)		Europe		Total	
Club	Season	Division	Apps	Goals	Apps	Goals	Apps	Goals	Apps	Goals
Haladás	2016–17	Nemzeti Bajnokság I	11	0	2	0	—		13	0
Haladás	2017–18	Nemzeti Bajnokság I	15	0	—		—		15	0
Haladás	2019–20	Nemzeti Bajnokság II	26	2	4	1	—		30	3
Haladás	2020–21	Nemzeti Bajnokság II	32	3	2	0	—		34	3
Haladás	2021–22	Nemzeti Bajnokság II	35	3	0	0	—		35	3
Haladás	Total		119	8	8	1	—		127	9
Kazincbarcika (loan)	2018–19	Nemzeti Bajnokság II	32	0	2	0	—		34	0
Bánhorváti-Kazincbarcika (loan)	2018–19	Megyei Bajnokság I	1	0	—		—		1	0
Győr	2022–23	Nemzeti Bajnokság II	35	0	2	1	—		37	1
Kecskemét	2023–24	Nemzeti Bajnokság I	10	0	0	0	2 (Note: Appearances in UEFA Europa Conference League)	0	12	0
Kecskemét II	2023–24	Nemzeti Bajnokság III	1	0	—		—		1	0
Zalaegerszeg	2023–24	Nemzeti Bajnokság I	16	1	0	0	—		16	1
Zalaegerszeg	2024–25	Nemzeti Bajnokság I	15	1	2	0	—		17	1
Zalaegerszeg	Total		31	2	2	0	—		33	2
Career total			229	10	14	2	2	0	245	12
