= István Csirmaz =

Hungarian footballer

Personal information
- Date of birth: 4 May 1995 (age 31)
- Place of birth: Mezőkövesd, Hungary
- Height: 1.72 m (5 ft 8 in)
- Positions: Right midfielder; right back

Team information
- Current team: Mezőkövesd
- Number: 7

Youth career
- 2004–2014: Mezőkövesd

Senior career*
Years	Team	Apps	(Gls)
2014–2019	Mezőkövesd	8	(0)
2015–2016	→ Felsőtárkány (loan)	15	(0)
2016–2017	→ Szolnok (loan)	33	(1)
2017–2018	→ Szolnok (loan)	7	(1)
2018–2019	→ Cegléd (loan)	27	(0)
2019–2021	Szolnok	52	(1)
2021	Csákvár	5	(0)
2021–2022	Puskás Akadémia	7	(0)
2022–2024	Diósgyőr	29	(1)
2024–	Mezőkövesd	33	(0)
- * Club domestic league appearances and goals as of 31 May 2026

István Csirmaz (born 4 May 1995) is a Hungarian football player who plays for Mezőkövesd.

== Club career ==
On 30 August 2021, Csirmaz signed with Puskás Akadémia.

On 16 June 2022, Csirmaz moved to Diósgyőr.

== Career statistics ==
Appearances and goals by club, season and competition
Club	Season	League			Cup		League Cup		Europe		Total	
Club	Season	Division	Apps	Goals	Apps	Goals	Apps	Goals	Apps	Goals	Apps	Goals
Mezőkövesd
Mezőkövesd	2013–14	Nemzeti Bajnokság I	1	0	0	0	0	0	—		1	0
Mezőkövesd	2014–15	Nemzeti Bajnokság II	3	0	1	0	6	1	—		10	1
Mezőkövesd	2015–16	Nemzeti Bajnokság II	2	0	0	0	—		—		2	0
Mezőkövesd	2017–18	Nemzeti Bajnokság I	2	0	0	0	—		—		2	0
Mezőkövesd	Total		8	0	2	0	6	1	0	0	16	1
Felsőtárkány	2015–16	Nemzeti Bajnokság III	15	0	1	0	—		—		16	0
Szolnok	2016–17	Nemzeti Bajnokság II	33	1	6	0	—		—		39	1
Career total			56	1	8	0	6	1	0	0	70	2

Updated to games played as of 9 December 2017.
