= Márk Jagodics =

Hungarian footballer (born 1992)

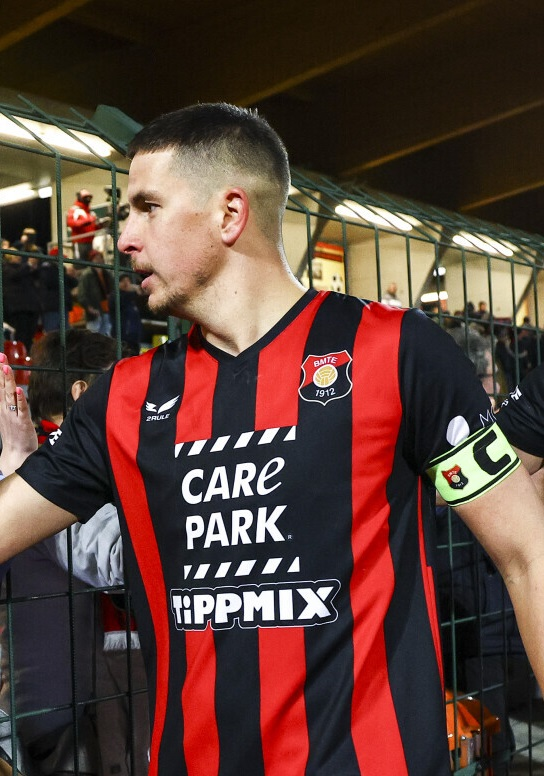
- Jagodics with Budafok in 2023

Personal information
- Date of birth: 10 April 1992 (age 34)
- Place of birth: Szombathely, Hungary
- Height: 1.90 m (6 ft 3 in)
- Position: Centre-back

Team information
- Current team: Budafok
- Number: 26

Youth career
- 2003–2011: Mezőkövesd

Senior career*
| Years | Team | Apps | (Gls) |
| 2011–2020 | Haladás | 160 | (5) |
| 2013–2014 | → Ajka (loan) | 27 | (0) |
| 2020–2021 | Mezőkövesd | 4 | (0) |
| 2021 | → Budafok (loan) | 14 | (0) |
| 2021–2023 | Budafok | 76 | (3) |
| 2023–2024 | Haladás | 31 | (1) |
| 2024–2025 | Tatabánya | 28 | (4) |
| 2025– | Budafok | 19 | (1) |

International career
| 2012–2013 | Hungary U-21 | 3 | (0) |
- * Club domestic league appearances and goals as of 31 May 2026

Márk Jagodics (born 10 April 1992) is a Hungarian professional footballer who plays as a centre-back for Nemzeti Bajnokság II club Budafok.

== Career statistics ==
Appearances and goals by club, season and competition
| Club | Season | League | | | Cup | | League Cup | | Europe | | Total | |
| Club | Season | Division | Apps | Goals | Apps | Goals | Apps | Goals | Apps | Goals | Apps | Goals |
|---|---|---|---|---|---|---|---|---|---|---|---|---|
Haladás
| Haladás | 2010–11 | Nemzeti Bajnokság I | 1 | 0 | 2 | 0 | 2 | 0 | 0 | 0 | 5 | 0 |
| Haladás | 2011–12 | Nemzeti Bajnokság I | 1 | 0 | 0 | 0 | 4 | 0 | 0 | 0 | 5 | 0 |
| Haladás | 2012–13 | Nemzeti Bajnokság I | 10 | 0 | 1 | 0 | 3 | 0 | 0 | 0 | 14 | 0 |
| Haladás | 2014–15 | Nemzeti Bajnokság I | 17 | 1 | 3 | 0 | 4 | 0 | 0 | 0 | 24 | 1 |
| Haladás | 2015–16 | Nemzeti Bajnokság I | 23 | 1 | 3 | 0 | — | | — | | 26 | 1 |
| Haladás | 2016–17 | Nemzeti Bajnokság I | 20 | 0 | 2 | 0 | — | | — | | 22 | 0 |
| Haladás | 2017–18 | Nemzeti Bajnokság I | 27 | 2 | 1 | 0 | — | | — | | 28 | 2 |
| Haladás | 2018–19 | Nemzeti Bajnokság I | 25 | 1 | 4 | 1 | — | | — | | 29 | 2 |
| Haladás | 2019–20 | Nemzeti Bajnokság II | 26 | 0 | 3 | 0 | — | | — | | 29 | 0 |
| Haladás | Total | | 160 | 5 | 19 | 1 | 13 | 0 | 0 | 0 | 182 | 6 |
| Ajka | 2013–14 | Nemzeti Bajnokság II | 27 | 0 | 2 | 0 | 4 | 0 | 0 | 0 | 33 | 0 |
| Mezőkövesd | 2020–21 | Nemzeti Bajnokság I | 4 | 0 | 0 | 0 | — | | — | | 4 | 0 |
| Budafok | 2020–21 | Nemzeti Bajnokság I | 14 | 0 | 0 | 0 | — | | — | | 14 | 0 |
| Career total | | | 195 | 5 | 21 | 1 | 17 | 0 | 0 | 0 | 233 | 6 |

Updated to games played as of 15 May 2021.
