= Promontor utcai Stadion =

Budafoki MTE's home ground, stadium in Budapest

Coordinates: 47°25′18″N 19°01′42″E

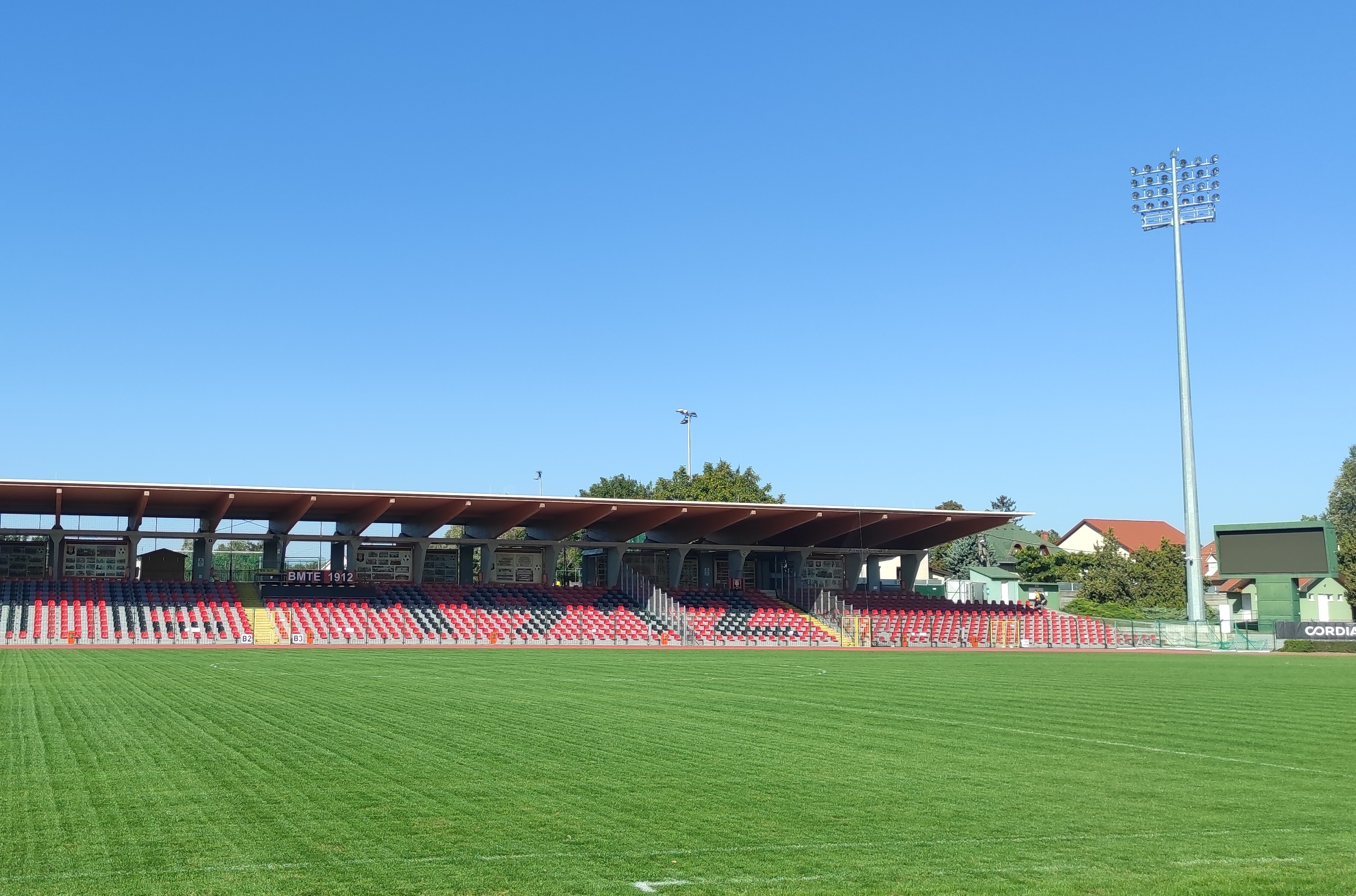
- Interactive map of Promontor utcai Stadion
- Full name: Promontor utcai Stadion
- Location: Budapest, Hungary
- Owner: Budafoki MTE
- Capacity: 1,200
- Surface: Grass; Field
- Record attendance: 7,000 (Budafok v Ferencváros, 19 May 1984 Magyar Kupa)
- Field size: 105 m × 68 m (344 ft × 223 ft) February

Tenants
- Budafoki MTE; Újbuda FC

Website
- www.magyarfutball.hu

Promontor utcai Stadion is a football stadium in Budapest, Hungary. The stadium is home to the association football side Budafoki MTE. The stadium has a capacity of 1,200.

== History ==
In 2017 floodlights were installed and a roof was built over the stands.

On 15 September 2024, Budafok hosted Ferencvárosi TC in the 2024–25 Magyar Kupa season.

== Transport ==
The stadium is located in Budafok, the 22nd district of Budapest, Hungary. The stadium can be easily reached by public transport via bus.

Service	Station/Stop	Line/Route	Walking distance from stadium
Budapest bus	Víg utca	58	100 m 2 mins
Budapest bus	Víg utca	158	100 m 2 mins
Budapest bus	Víg utca	250	100 m 2 mins
Budapest bus	Víg utca	250B	100 m 2 mins

== Gallery ==
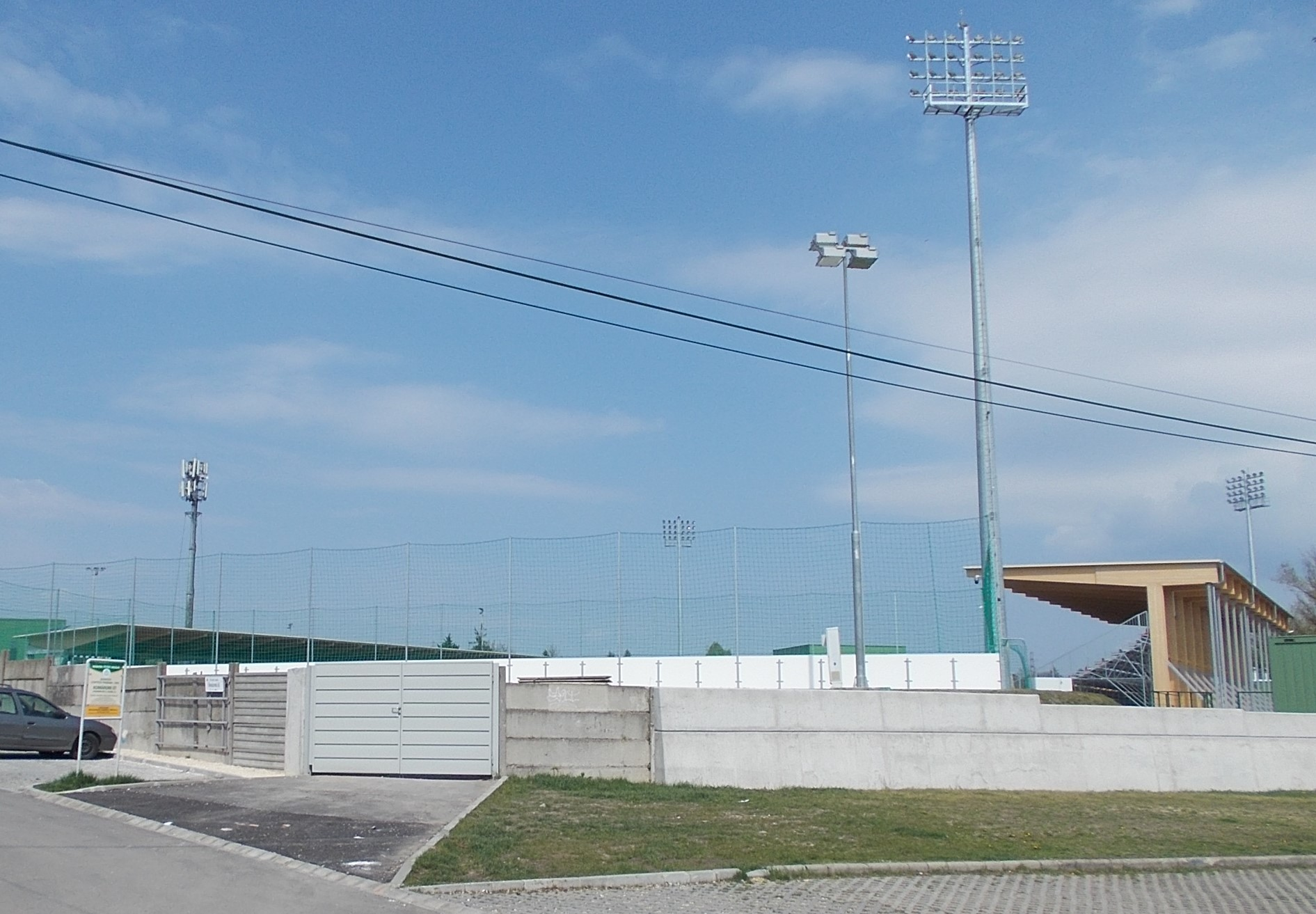
