= Olivér Horváth =

Hungarian footballer (born 2000)

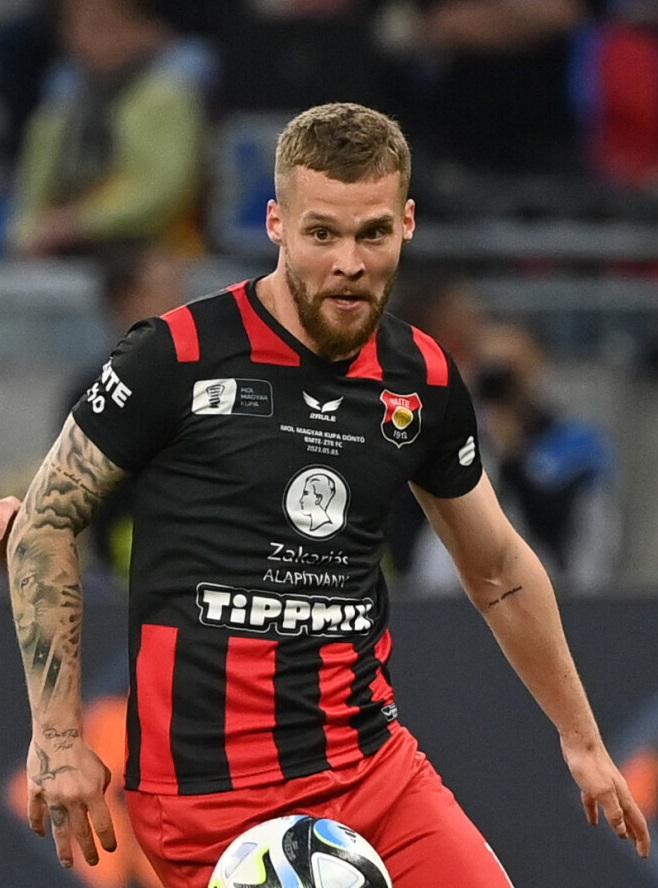
- Horváth playing for Budafok in 2023

Personal information
- Full name: Olivér Milán Horváth
- Date of birth: 18 July 2000 (age 26)
- Place of birth: Budapest, Hungary
- Height: 1.70 m (5 ft 7 in)
- Position: Winger

Team information
- Current team: Dorog
- Number: 7

Youth career
- 2007–2011: Ferencváros
- 2011–2016: MTK
- 2016–2018: Ajax
- 2018–2019: PSV Eindhoven

Senior career*
Years	Team	Apps	(Gls)
2019–2020	Jong PSV	15	(0)
2020–2021	MTK Budapest	0	(0)
2020	→ Haladás (loan)	7	(0)
2021	Győr	5	(0)
2021–2022	III. Kerület	31	(1)
2022–2025	Budafok	75	(2)
2025–	Dorog	17	(0)

International career^{‡}
2016	Hungary U17	2	(0)
2018	Hungary U18	2	(0)
2018	Hungary U19	2	(0)
- * Club domestic league appearances and goals as of 15 June 2025 ‡ National team caps and goals as of 8 September 2018

Olivér Milán Horváth (born 18 July 2000) is a Hungarian footballer who plays as a winger for Nemzeti Bajnokság III club Dorog.

== Career ==
On 1 September 2020, Horváth returned to Hungary from the Netherlands, where he signed with MTK Budapest FC. However, due to the rules, he could not be registered for MTK and for that reason, he was immediately loaned out to Szombathelyi Haladás for the 2020–21 season.

In February 2021, he moved to Győri ETO FC. Five months later, in July 2021, Horváth joined III. Kerületi TVE.

== Career statistics ==
=== Club ===
As of 16 June 2020.

Club	Season	League			Cup		Continental		Other		Total	
Club	Season	Division	Apps	Goals	Apps	Goals	Apps	Goals	Apps	Goals	Apps	Goals
Jong PSV	2019–20	Eerste Divisie	15	0	–		–		0	0	15	0
Career total			15	0	0	0	0	0	0	0	15	0
