= 2014–15 Magyar Kupa =

Tournament details
- Country: Hungary

Final positions
- Champions: Ferencváros (21st title)
- Runners-up: Videoton

Tournament statistics
- Top goal scorer: (Hungary) Róbert Feczesin

The 2014–15 Magyar Kupa (English: Hungarian Cup) was the 75th season of Hungary's annual knock-out cup football competition. It started with the first match of the first round on 7 August 2014 and ended with the final held in May 2015 at Ferenc Puskás Stadium, Budapest. Újpest are the defending champions, having won their ninth cup competition last season. The winner of the competition will qualify for the second qualifying round of the 2015–16 UEFA Europa League.

== Round of 128 ==
Matches were played on 7, 9, 10, 12, & 13 August 2014 and involved the teams qualified through the local cup competitions during the previous season, Nemzeti Bajnokság III, Nemzeti Bajnokság II, and the Nemzeti Bajnokság I teams.

Team 1	Score	Team 2
7 August 2014
Újbuda (III)	1–2	Zalaegerszegi (II)
9 August 2014
Ónod SE (IV)	0–6	Siófok (II)
Kozármisleny (III)	5–1 (a.e.t.)	Diósdi TC (III)
Monori SE (III)	2–4	Balmazújvárosi (II)
Dunaharaszti MTK (III)	1–2	Békéscsaba (II)
Tatabánya (III)	2–3	Szeged 2011 (II)
Püspökladányi LE (IV)	1–2	Győrsövényház (IV)
Mórahalom VSE (IV)	3–2	Maglódi TC (III)
Nyírbátori FC (III)	1–5	Vác FC (III)
Jászfényszarui (IV)	0–1	Bajai (III)
Kisújszállási SE (IV)	1–3	Tiszaújváros (III)
Alsózsolcai KSC (IV)	2–3	Velence SE (IV)
Nőtincs SE (IV)	5–1	II. Rákóczi Ferenc SE Szakoly (IV)
Iváncsa KSE (IV)	1–0	Hajdúböszörményi TE (III)
Hatvan (III)	2–3	Csákvári TK (II)
Csepel FC (III)	12–0	Létavértes SC 97 (III)
Körmendi FC (IV)	0–5	Gyirmót SE (II)
Majosi SE (IV)	0–8	Ceglédi VSE (II)
Sárosd NSK (IV)	3–2	Mosonmagyaróvári TE (III)
Ikarus Budapest SE (IV)	1–0	Kondorosi TE (IV)
Sárisáp (IV)	1–2	Jászapáti VSE (IV)
Cigánd SE (III)	2–3	Szigetszentmiklósi TK (II)
Soltvadkerti TE (IV)	2–0	Ebes KKSE (IV)
Pétervására SE (IV)	1–2	BKV Előre (III)
Balatoni Vasas SE (IV)	0–0 (4–5 p)	Fertőszentmiklós SE (IV)
Veresegyhaz VSK (III)	0–7	Bölcskei SE (III)
Mezőkovácsházi TE (IV)	0–7	Mezőkövesd-Zsóry SE (II)
Sajóbábony Vegyész SE (IV)	5–2	Nagybajomi AC (IV)
Gyulaháza KSE (IV)	0–3	Ajka (II)
Várda SE (III)	4–1	Tököl Városi SK (III)
Celldömölki VSE (IV)	3–0	Sárvári FC (III)
Kunszállás SE (IV)	1–8	Rákosmenti KSK (III)
Semjénháza SE (IV)	2–4	Szegedi EOL SC (III)
Orosháza FC (III)	1–0	Dunaújváros PASE (I)
10 August 2014
Tevel SE (IV)	7–2	Csetény SE (IV)
Nagykáta SE (IV)	0–4	Balatonfüredi FC (III)
Taksony SE (IV)	1–3	Szolnoki MÁV FC (II)
Himesháza KSE (IV)	2–1	Csácsbozsok-Nemesapáti SE (IV)
Babócsa SE (IV)	0–2	Kazincbarcikai SC (III)
Fűzfői AK (IV)	0–6	Vecsési FC 1911 (IV)
Szerencs VSE (IV)	3–1	Komlói Bányász SK (IV)
Tatai AC (IV)	3–9	Salgótarjáni BTC (III)
FC Dabas (III)	1–3	Erzsébeti Spartacus MTK LE (III)
Kótaj SE (IV)	0–1	Rákospalotai EAC (III)
Répcelaki SE (IV)	0–1	Nagyatádi FC (III)
Gyöngyösi AK (III)	2–3	Putnok VSE (III)
Taliándörögd-Halimba SE (IV)	0–2	FC Veszprém (III)
Győrszemere KSK (IV)	1–2	Kaposvári Rákóczi FC (II)
Voyage FC (IV)	1–2	Gyulai FC (III)
12 August 2014
Felsőtárkány SC (III)	2–1	Paks (I)
Andráshida SC (IV)	1–3	Puskás Akadémia FC (I)
Szentlőrinc SE (III)	0–2	MTK Budapest FC (I)
13 August 2014
Dorogi FC (III)	1–4	Szombathelyi Haladás (I)
Kalocsai FC (IV)	0–8	Nyíregyháza Spartacus FC (I)
Szászvári SE Nyuszi (IV)	0–3	Pécsi MFC (I)
Soroksár SC (II)	2–0	Lombard-Pápa TFC (I)
Budaörsi SC (III)	1–3	Újpest FC (I)
Nyíradony VVTK (IV)	0–8	Kecskeméti TE (I)
Szekszárdi UFC (III)	0–3	Debreceni VSC (I)
Csornai SE (IV)	0–2	Budapest Honvéd FC (I)
Hévíz FC (IV)	0–8	Ferencvárosi TC (I)
Testvériség SE (IV)	0–7	Videoton FC (I)
Vasas SC (II)	0–4	Diósgyőri VTK (I)
27 August 2014
Soproni VSE (II)	0–1	Győri ETO FC (I)

== Round of 64 ==
Team 1	Score	Team 2
2 September 2014
Nagyatádi FC (III)	2–0	FC Veszprém (III)
9 September 2014
Békéscsaba (II)	3–1	Siófok (II)
Tiszaújváros (III)	0–3	Mezőkövesd-Zsóry SE (II)
Felsőtárkány SC (III)	0–1	Budapest Honvéd FC (I)
Himesháza KSE (IV)	0–13	Újpest FC (I)
Orosháza FC (III)	1–5	Puskás Akadémia FC (I)
Tevel SE (IV)	2–7	MTK Budapest FC (I)
Velence SE (IV)	1–2	Kaposvári Rákóczi FC (II)
Szeged 2011 (II)	0–1	Szigetszentmiklósi TK (II)
10 September 2014
Szerencs VSE (IV)	0–10	Erzsébeti Spartacus MTK LE (III)
Szegedi EOL SC (III)	1–4	Pécsi MFC (I)
Soltvadkerti TE (IV)	1–6	BKV Előre (III)
Sárosd NSK (IV)	1–2	Salgótarjáni BTC (III)
Sajóbábony Vegyész SE (IV)	2–1	Nőtincs SE (IV)
Rákosmenti KSK (III)	0–8	Videoton FC (I)
Putnok VSE (III)	1–3	Győri ETO FC (I)
Mórahalom VSE (IV)	0–6	Debreceni VSC (I)
Kozármisleny (III)	2–1	Balmazújvárosi (II)
Várda SE (III)	2–0	Ceglédi VSE (II)
Kazincbarcikai SC (III)	4–1	Rákospalotai EAC (III)
Jászapáti VSE (IV)	3–1	Gyulai FC (III)
Iváncsa KSE (IV)	0–4	Diósgyőri VTK (I)
Ikarus Budapest SE (IV)	1–5	Csákvári TK (II)
Győrsövényház (IV)	0–8	Nyíregyháza Spartacus FC (I)
Fertőszentmiklós SE (IV)	0–7	Szombathelyi Haladás (I)
Csepel FC (III)	3–4	Szolnoki MÁV FC (II)
Celldömölki VSE (IV)	0–4	Ajka (II)
Bölcskei SE (III)	0–4	Gyirmót SE (II)
Balatonfüredi FC (III)	1–2	Vác FC (III)
Bajai (III)	1–4	Soroksár SC (II)
Zalaegerszegi (II)	2–3	Kecskeméti TE (I)
Vecsési FC 1911 (IV)	1–6	Ferencvárosi TC (I)

== Round of 32 ==
Team 1	Score	Team 2
23 September 2014
BKV Előre (III)	1–3	Budapest Honvéd FC (I)
Kazincbarcikai SC (III)	1–2	Csákvári TK (II)
Kozármisleny (III)	0–5	Pécsi MFC (I)
Nagyatádi FC (III)	0–2	Szolnoki MÁV FC (II)
Szigetszentmiklósi TK (II)	1–2	Videoton FC (I)
24 September 2014
Erzsébeti Spartacus MTK LE (III)	0–3	Ferencvárosi TC (I)
Ajka (II)	2–1	Soroksár SC (II)
Jászapáti VSE (IV)	0–9	MTK Budapest FC (I)
Várda SE (III)	3–2	Nyíregyháza Spartacus FC (I)
Puskás Akadémia FC (I)	0–2	Debreceni VSC (I)
Sajóbábony Vegyész SE (IV)	1–4	Diósgyőri VTK (I)
Salgótarjáni BTC (III)	1–3	Békéscsaba (II)
Vác FC (III)	5–2 (a.e.t.)	Kecskeméti TE (I)
Újpest FC (I)	2–0	Szombathelyi Haladás (I)
Mezőkövesd-Zsóry SE (II)	1–2	Győri ETO FC (I)
Gyirmót SE (II)	1–0	Kaposvári Rákóczi FC (II)

== Round of 16 ==
Team 1	Score	Team 2
28 October 2014
Videoton FC (I)	2–1	Diósgyőri VTK (I)
29 October 2014
Ajka (II)	1–1 (3–5 p)	Újpest FC (I)
Várda SE (III)	4–0	Vác FC (III)
Pécsi MFC (I)	1–0	Debreceni VSC (I)
Szolnoki MÁV FC (II)	2–1	MTK Budapest FC (I)
Budapest Honvéd FC (I)	0–0 (1–3 p)	Ferencvárosi TC (I)
Csákvári TK (II)	2–1	Békéscsaba (II)
Gyirmót SE (II)	2–0	Győri ETO FC (I)

== Quarter-finals ==
=== First leg ===
4 March 2015	Ferencvárosi TC (I)	5–0	Csákvári TK (II)	Groupama Arena, Budapest
18:00	Busai 7'; Lamah 37'; Busai 62'; Ramírez 65'; Busai 70'

4 March 2015	Gyirmót SE (II)	0–0	Újpest FC (I)	Ménfői úti stadion, Győr
17:00

4 March 2015	Videoton FC (I)	2–1	Pécsi MFC (I)	Sóstói Stadion, Székesfehérvár
18:00	Feczesin 66'; Alvarez 90+5'		Feczesin 44'

4 March 2015	Várda SE (III)	1–3	Szolnoki MÁV FC (II)	Stadion Várkerti, Kisvárda

=== Second leg ===
1 April 2015	Csákvári TK (II)	0–5 (0–10 agg.)	Ferencvárosi TC (I)	Tersztyánszky Ödön Sportközpont, Csákvár
18:00			Kukuruzović 27'; Čukić 33'; Nagy 44'; Ugrai 54'; Nagy 76'

1 April 2015	Újpest FC (I)	4–0 (4–0 agg.)	Gyirmót SE (II)	Ferenc Szusza Stadium, Újpest
	Balogh 8'; Litauszki 20'; Suljic 18'; Ojo 82'

1 April 2015	Pécsi MFC (I)	0–3 (1–5 agg.)	Videoton FC (I)	Stadion PMFC, Pécs

1 April 2015	Szolnoki MÁV FC (II)	1–1 (4–2 agg.)	Várda SE (III)	Tiszaligeti Stadion, Szolnok

== Semi-finals ==
=== First leg ===
7 April 2015	Szolnoki MÁV FC (II)	0–2	Ferencvárosi TC (I)	Tiszaligeti Stadion, Szolnok
18:00		Report	Lengyel 3' (o.g.); Varga 30'	Attendance: 2,200; Referee: Zoltán Iványi

8 April 2015	Videoton FC (I)	1–0	Újpest FC (I)	Sóstói Stadion, Székesfehérvár
18:00	Gyurcsó 43'	Report		Attendance: 1,200; Referee: Csaba Pintér

=== Second leg ===
28 April 2015	Újpest FC (I)	1–4 (1–5 agg.)	Videoton FC (I)	Ferenc Szusza Stadium, Budapest
18:00	Litauszki 39'	Report	Nikolić 23', 71'; Feczesin 88'; Oliveira 90+3'	Attendance: 1,000; Referee: Zsolt Szabó

29 April 2015	Ferencvárosi TC (I)	1–1 (3–1 agg.)	Szolnoki MÁV FC (II)	Groupama Arena, Budapest
18:00	Lamah 20'	Report	Papucsek 75'	Attendance: 750; Referee: Csaba Pintér

== Final ==
20 May 2015
20:00 (UTC+2)

Videoton FC (I)	0–4	Ferencvárosi TC (I)
	Report	Varga 53'; Batik 60'; Lamah 68'; Szolnoki 86' (o.g.)

Groupama Aréna
Attendance: 15,127
Referee: Zoltán Iványi

== See also ==
- 2014–15 Nemzeti Bajnokság I
- 2014–15 Nemzeti Bajnokság II
- 2014–15 Nemzeti Bajnokság III
- 2014–15 Ligakupa
