= 2014–15 Nemzeti Bajnokság III =

Nemzeti Bajnokság III
- Season: 2014–15
- Promoted: Budaörs (West); Vác (Central); Kisvárda (East)

The 2014–15 Nemzeti Bajnokság III began on August 16, 2014 and ended on June 30, 2015. 48 teams are competing in the season, divided into 3 groups. The 3 winners of the groups are promoted to NB II, while the teams from 14th to 16th and the worst 13th are relegated to Megyei Bajnokság I.

== Changes from 2013-14 ==
Teams relegated from NB II to NB III:

- Kisvárda
- Kozármisleny
- Tatabánya

Teams promoted to NB II from NB III:

- Soroksár champion of the Central
- Szeged best runner-up (instead of Létavértes)
- Csákvár champion of the West

Relegated form NB III to MB I:

- Komló
- Körmend
- Ferencváros II
- Ebes
- Eger disqualified

Teams promoted to NB III from MB I:

- Gyöngyös
- Jászberény
- Salgótarján
- Veresegyház stayed in NB III (due to lack of lower teams with NB III licence)
- Vác
- Maglód stayed in NB III (due to lack of lower teams with NB III licence)
- Bölcske stayed in NB III (due to lack of lower teams with NB III licence)
- SZEOL
- Szentlőrinc
- III. Kerület
- Diósd stayed in NB III (due to lack of lower teams with NB III licence)
- Tököl stayed in NB III (due to lack of lower teams with NB III licence)
- Sárvár

== Teams ==
=== Central ===
Following is the list of clubs competing in 2014–15 Nemzeti Bajnokság III - Central, with their location and stadium.

Locations of the 2014-15 Nemzeti Bajnokság III - Central teams

Team	Home city	Home ground
Baja	Baja	Bajai Városi Sporttelep
Bölcske	Bölcske	Bölcskei Sportpálya
ESMTK	Budapest	Ady Endre utcai Stadion
Rákospalota	Budapest	Budai II. László Stadion
Dabas	Dabas	Dabasi Sporttelep
Dunaharaszti	Dunaharaszti	Dunaharaszti Sportpálya
Gyula	Gyula	id. Christián László Városi Sporttelep
Kozármisleny	Kozármisleny	Alkotmány téri Stadion
Maglód	Maglód	Kertész Károly Stadion
Monor	Monor	Balassi Bálint utcai Stadion
Orosháza	Orosháza	Mátrai- Stadion
SZEOL	Szeged	Felső Tisza-parti stadion
Videoton II	Székesfehérvár	Sóstói Stadion
Szekszárd	Szekszárd	Szekszárdi Városi Stadion
Szentlőrinc	Szentlőrinc	Szentlőrinci Sportpálya
Vác	Vác	Ligeti Stadion

=== East ===
Following is the list of clubs competing in 2014–15 Nemzeti Bajnokság III - East, with their location and stadium.

Locations of the 2014-15 Nemzeti Bajnokság III -East teams

Team	Home city	Home ground
Honvéd II	Budapest	Bozsik József Stadion
Cigánd	Cigánd	Cigándi Sportpálya
Debrecen II	Debrecen	Oláh Gábor utcai Stadion
Felsőtárkány	Felsőtárkány	Felsőtárkányi Sportpálya
Gyöngyös	Gyöngyös	Kömlei Károly Városi Sporttelep
Hajdúböszörmény	Hajdúböszörmény	Városi sport- és rendezvényközpont
Hatvan	Hatvan	Népkert-Sporttelep
Jászberény	Jászberény	Jászberényi Városi Stadion
Kazincbarcika	Kazincbarcika	Pete András Stadion
Létavértes	Létavértes	Létavértesi Sportcentrum
Kisvárda	Kisvárda	Várkerti Stadion
Nyírbátor	Nyírbátor	Sport utcai Stadion
Putnok	Putnok	Várady Béla Sportközpont
Salgótarján	Salgótarján	Tó-strandi Sporttelep
Tiszaújváros	Tiszaújváros	Tiszaújvárosi Sport Park
Veresegyház	Veresegyház	Veresegyházi Sportpálya

=== West ===
Following is the list of clubs competing in 2014–15 Nemzeti Bajnokság III - West, with their location and stadium.

Locations of the 2014-15 Nemzeti Bajnokság III - West teams

Team	Home city	Home ground
Balatonfüred	Balatonfüred	Balatonfüredi Városi Sportpálya
Budaörs	Budaörs	Árok utcai Stadion
BKV Előre	Budapest	Sport utcai Stadion
Újbuda	Budapest	Sportmax Pálya
III. Kerület	Budapest	Hévízi úti Stadion
Rákosmente	Budapest	RKSK-pálya
Csepel	Budapest	Béke téri Stadion
Diósd	Diósd	Diósdi Sportpálya
Dorog	Dorog	Buzánszky Jenő Stadion
Győr II	Győr	ETO Park
Mosonmagyaróvár	Mosonmagyaróvár	Wittmann Antal park
Nagyatád	Nagyatád	Mudin Imre Sportcentrum
Sárvár	Sárvár	Sárvári Sporttelep
Tatabánya	Tatabánya	Grosics Gyula Stadion
Tököl	Tököl	Sport utca
Veszprém	Veszprém	Veszprémi Városi Stadion

=== Personnel ===
==== Central ====
Team	Manager
Baja	(Hungary) Zoltán Evanics
Bölcske	(Hungary) Attila Buzás
ESMTK	(Hungary) Zoltán Turi
Rákospalota	(Hungary) József Dzurják
Dabas	(Hungary) József Honti
Dunaharaszti	(Hungary) Péter Króner
Gyula	(Hungary) Lajos Szekeres
Kozármisleny	(Hungary) Zsolt Németh
Maglód	(Hungary) Tibor Bajor
Monor	(Hungary) Mihály Tóth
Orosháza	(Hungary) József Kvasznovszky
SZEOL	(Hungary) Ákos Tóth
Videoton II	(Hungary) Imre Biró
Szekszárd	(Hungary) János Kvanduk
Szentlőrinc	(Hungary) Tamás Nagy
Vác	(Hungary) János Csank

==== East ====
Team	Manager
Honvéd II	(Hungary) Miklós Simon
Cigánd	(Hungary) Zoltán Fogarasi
Debrecen II	(Hungary) Csaba Szatmári
Felsőtárkány	(Hungary) Norbert Elek
Gyöngyös	(Hungary) Zoltán Majzik
Hajdúböszörmény	(Serbia) Igor Bogdanović
Hatvan	(Hungary) Gábor Híres
Jászberény	(Hungary) Imre Szabó
Kazincbarcika	(Hungary) György Koleszár
Létavértes	(Hungary) Zoltán Szilágyi
Kisvárda	(Hungary) Attila Révész
Nyírbátor	(Hungary) János Kovács
Putnok	(Hungary) Péter Koszta
Salgótarján	(Hungary) Zoltán Tamási
Tiszaújváros	(Hungary) Zoltán Bocsi
Veresegyház	(Hungary) Csaba Balogh

==== West ====
Team	Manager
Balatonfüred	(Hungary) Tamás Pető
Budaörs	(Hungary) Flórián Albert
BKV Előre	(Hungary) Imre Soós
Újbuda	(Hungary) Sándor Pári
III. Kerület	(Hungary) László Varga
Rákosmente	(Hungary) Tibor Halgas
Csepel	(Hungary) Zoltán Szabó
Diósd	(Hungary) József Orenstein
Dorog	(Hungary) Szabolcs Németh
Győr II	(Hungary) Zoltán Németh
Mosonmagyaróvár	(Hungary) Zoltán Tiba
Nagyatád	(Hungary) Zoltán Papp
Sárvár	(Hungary) Gábor Takács
Tatabánya	(Hungary) Attila Miskei
Tököl	(Hungary) Tamás Futó
Veszprém	(Hungary) Attila Simon

=== Managerial changes ===
Team	Outgoing manager	Manner of departure	Date of vacancy	Position in table	Incoming manager	Date of appointment
Salgótarján	(Hungary) Zoltán Tamási	Promotion to Board Member	10 September 2014	10th	(Hungary) Béla Oláh	10 September 2014
Felsőtárkány	(Hungary) Norbert Elek	Resigned	23 September 2014	9th	(Hungary) József Balogh (caretaker)	23 September 2014
Kazincbarcika	(Hungary) György Koleszár	Resigned	23 September 2014	7th	(Hungary) Richárd Vincze (caretaker)	23 September 2014
Kazincbarcika	(Hungary) Richárd Vincze (caretaker)	End of appointment	7 October 2014	6th	(Hungary) György Gálhidi	7 October 2014
Cigánd	(Hungary) Zoltán Fogarasi	Sacked	21 October 2014	4th	(Hungary) Ferenc Vígh (caretaker)	21 October 2014
Gyöngyös	(Hungary) Zoltán Majzik	Sacked	30 October 2014	15th	(Hungary) Dr. János Tóth	30 October 2014
Felsőtárkány	(Hungary) József Balogh (caretaker)	End of appointment	3 November 2014	14th	(Hungary) Szilárd Sütő	3 November 2014
Balatonfüred	(Hungary) Tamás Pető	Resigned	5 December 2014	10th	(Hungary) Károly Földesi	13 January 2015
Cigánd	(Hungary) Ferenc Vígh (caretaker)	End of appointment	23 December 2014	5th	(Hungary) Pál Popovits	23 December 2014
Hajdúböszörmény	(Serbia) Igor Bogdanović	Sacked	28 March 2015	13th	(Hungary) Zoltán Fogarasi	2 April 2015

== Standings ==
=== Central ===
Pos	Team	Pld	W	D	L	GF	GA	GD	Pts	Promotion or relegation
1	Vác (C, P)	30	19	6	5	70	29	+41	63	Promotion to Nemzeti Bajnokság II
2	Kozármisleny	30	18	7	5	76	26	+50	61	
3	Rákospalota	30	14	9	7	55	45	+10	51	
4	Videoton II	30	15	5	10	53	34	+19	50	
5	SZEOL	30	15	4	11	43	34	+9	49	
6	Monor	30	14	6	10	50	45	+5	48	
7	Szekszárd	30	13	6	11	48	40	+8	45	
8	Dunaharaszti	30	12	9	9	42	35	+7	45	
9	ESMTK	30	13	6	11	40	33	+7	45	
10	Dabas	30	13	6	11	51	45	+6	45	
11	Bölcske	30	13	3	14	61	49	+12	42	
12	Gyula	30	10	8	12	41	56	−15	38	
13	Szentlőrinc	30	8	9	13	37	50	−13	33	Possible Relegation to Megyei Bajnokság I
14	Orosháza (R)	30	7	5	18	23	53	−30	26	Relegation and not competed in any division next season
15	Baja (R)	30	5	4	21	20	84	−64	19	Relegation to Megyei Bajnokság I
16	Maglód (R)	30	2	5	23	20	72	−52	11	Relegation to Megyei Bajnokság I

Source: HFF
Rules for classification: 1) Points; 2) Matches won; 3) Goal difference; 4) Goals scored; 5) Head-to-head points; 6) Head-to-head goal difference; 7) Head-to-head away goals scored; 8) Fair play ranking; 9) Drawing of lots.
(C) Champions; (P) Promoted; (R) Relegated

=== East ===
Pos	Team	Pld	W	D	L	GF	GA	GD	Pts	Promotion or relegation
1	Kisvárda (C, P)	28	24	2	2	92	21	+71	74	Promotion to Nemzeti Bajnokság II
2	Putnok	28	22	3	3	71	24	+47	69	
3	Hatvan	28	15	6	7	59	36	+23	51	
4	Kazincbarcika	28	15	6	7	46	25	+21	51	
5	Cigánd	28	14	7	7	46	30	+16	49	
6	Tiszaújváros	28	14	2	12	36	52	−16	44	
7	Honvéd II	28	13	2	13	44	29	+15	41	
8	Nyírbátor	28	12	3	13	52	51	+1	39	
9	Jászberény	28	11	6	11	46	50	−4	39	
10	Debrecen II	28	10	8	10	48	33	+15	38	
11	Felsőtárkány	28	9	4	15	37	64	−27	31	
12	Veresegyház (R)	28	7	3	18	28	61	−33	24	Possible Relegation to Megyei Bajnokság I
13	Hajdúböszörmény (R)	28	6	3	19	32	57	−25	21	Relegation to Megyei Bajnokság I
14	Salgótarján (R)	28	5	4	19	32	70	−38	19	Relegation to Megyei Bajnokság I
15	Gyöngyös (R)	28	1	5	22	13	79	−66	8	Relegation to Megyei Bajnokság I
16	Létavértes (Note: Létavértes failed to meet the financial expectations of the league, and officially withdrew from the tournament on 5 September 2014.) (D)	0	0	0	0	0	0	0	0	Exclution and relegation to Megyei Bajnokság II

Source: HFF
Rules for classification: 1) Points; 2) Matches won; 3) Goal difference; 4) Goals scored; 5) Head-to-head points; 6) Head-to-head goal difference; 7) Head-to-head away goals scored; 8) Fair play ranking; 9) Drawing of lots.
(C) Champions; (D) Disqualified; (P) Promoted; (R) Relegated

=== West ===
Pos	Team	Pld	W	D	L	GF	GA	GD	Pts	Promotion or relegation
1	Budaörs (C, P)	28	19	7	2	63	19	+44	64	Promotion to Nemzeti Bajnokság II
2	Győr II (Note: Győr's first team could only submit an entry in NB III instead of the first division after financial and license problems.) (R)	28	16	6	6	50	26	+24	54	Relegation and not competed in any division next season
3	Diósd	28	14	5	9	37	35	+2	47	
4	Rákosmente	28	13	6	9	44	30	+14	45	
5	Tatabánya	28	12	9	7	53	35	+18	45	
6	Újbuda (Note: Újbuda merged into Budafok and competed together next season, with the Budafok MB I playing rights being acquired by this legal entity.) (R)	28	13	5	10	34	33	+1	44	Relegation to Megyei Bajnokság I
7	BKV Előre	28	10	10	8	41	38	+3	40	
8	Dorog	28	17	6	5	36	18	+18	35 (Note: Dorog were deducted 22 points.)	
9	Sárvár	28	10	5	13	33	43	−10	35	
10	III. Kerület	28	9	7	12	39	48	−9	34	
11	Balatonfüred	28	8	6	14	37	42	−5	30	
12	Mosonmagyaróvár	28	7	8	13	32	43	−11	29	
13	Csepel	28	8	4	16	25	34	−9	26 (Note: Csepel were deducted 2 points.)	Possible Relegation to Megyei Bajnokság I
14	Nagyatád (R)	28	6	6	16	22	49	−27	24	Relegation to Megyei Bajnokság I
15	Tököl (R)	28	1	4	23	13	66	−53	6 (Note: Tököl were deducted 1 point.)	Relegation to Megyei Bajnokság I
16	Veszprém (Note: Veszprém officially withdrawed from the tournament on 13 February 2015.) (D)	0	0	0	0	0	0	0	0	Exclution and relegation to Megyei Bajnokság I

Source: HFF
Rules for classification: 1) Points; 2) Matches won; 3) Goal difference; 4) Goals scored; 5) Head-to-head points; 6) Head-to-head goal difference; 7) Head-to-head away goals scored; 8) Fair play ranking; 9) Drawing of lots.
(C) Champions; (D) Disqualified; (P) Promoted; (R) Relegated
