= 2011–12 Nemzeti Bajnokság III =

Nemzeti Bajnokság III
- Season: 2011–12
- Champions: Dunaharaszti MTK (Alföld); Aqvital FC Csákvár (Bakony); Kaposvári Rákóczi FC II (Dráva); Érdi VSE (Duna); Putnok VSE (Mátra) Várda SE (Tisza)
- Promoted: Aqvital FC Csákvár (Bakony); Szombathelyi Haladás II (Bakony); Kaposvári Rákóczi FC II (Dráva); Putnok VSE (Mátra)

The 2011–12 Nemzeti Bajnokság III season was the 31st edition of the Nemzeti Bajnokság III.

== League tables ==
=== Alföld group ===
Pos	Team	Pld	W	D	L	GF	GA	GD	Pts	Relegation
1	Dunaharaszti MTK	30	19	7	4	58	19	+39	64	
2	FC Dabas	30	18	10	2	64	22	+42	64	
3	Várfürdő-Gyulai Termál FC	30	15	8	7	51	25	+26	53	
4	Tisza Volán SC Szeged	30	15	6	9	72	38	+34	51	
5	Kecskeméti TE II	30	14	9	7	53	34	+19	51	
6	Tápiószecső FC	30	14	5	11	58	47	+11	47	
7	Tököl VSK	30	12	9	9	55	38	+17	45	
8	Indotek Csepel FC	30	10	13	7	39	27	+12	43	
9	Monor SE	30	12	3	15	44	50	−6	39	
10	Üllő SE	30	11	4	15	45	54	−9	37	
11	Hódmezővásárhelyi FC	30	10	5	15	35	43	−8	35	
12	Makó FC	30	8	10	12	40	44	−4	34	
13	Szolnoki MÁV FC II	30	9	6	15	29	48	−19	33	Relegated
14	Szarvasi FC	30	7	4	19	38	61	−23	25	Relegated
15	Jánoshida SE	30	5	2	23	24	115	−91	17	Relegated
16	Pilis Sport (Note: Withdrew)	30	9	3	18	18	58	−40	30	Relegated

=== Bakony group ===
Pos	Team	Pld	W	D	L	GF	GA	GD	Pts	Promotion or relegation
1	Aqvital-Publo Csákvári TK	28	24	3	1	81	18	+63	75	Promotion to Nemzeti Bajnokság II
2	Szombathelyi Haladás II	28	23	2	3	78	15	+63	71	
3	Csornai SE	30	20	2	8	56	26	+30	62	
4	Balatonfüredi FC	28	14	8	6	51	34	+17	50	
5	Hévíz SK	28	13	4	11	34	32	+2	43	
6	Répcelaki SE	28	13	3	12	35	33	+2	42	
7	Zalaegerszegi TE FC II (Note: did not participate in any competitions due to the relegation of their first team from the first tier)	28	12	3	13	50	51	−1	39	Relegated
8	Móri SE	28	11	5	12	43	44	−1	38	
9	Lombard Pápa Termál FC II	28	11	4	13	47	37	+10	37	
10	Mosonmagyaróvári TE 1904	28	10	7	11	48	38	+10	37	
11	Körmendi FC	28	10	5	13	46	58	−12	35	
12	Nagykanizsai TE 1866-Horváth Méh	28	9	5	14	44	55	−11	32	
13	Sárvár FC	28	7	4	17	31	45	−14	25	
14	Morello.hu-Várpalotai BSK	28	6	1	21	27	90	−63	19	Relegated
15	Badacsonytomaj SE (Note: deleted)	28	0	0	28	8	103	−95	0	

=== Dráva group ===
Pos	Team	Pld	W	D	L	GF	GA	GD	Pts	Promotion or relegation
1	Kaposvári Rákóczi FC II	28	19	6	3	60	23	+37	63	Promotion to Nemzeti Bajnokság II
2	Pécsi MFC-Matias II	28	17	6	5	62	23	+39	57	
3	Nagyatádi FC	28	17	5	6	53	32	+21	56	
4	Tolle UFC Szekszárd	28	15	8	5	55	18	+37	53	
5	Szentlőrinc SE	28	16	4	8	52	26	+26	52	
6	Komlói Bányász SK	28	14	4	10	49	39	+10	46	
7	Bölcskei SE	28	11	8	9	50	42	+8	41	
8	Bonyhád VLC	28	13	2	13	51	58	−7	41	
9	BFC Siófok II	28	11	7	10	53	51	+2	40	
10	AC Nagybajom	28	11	6	11	50	48	+2	39	
11	Balatonlelle SE	28	8	7	13	36	50	−14	31	
12	Dombóvári FC-Rutin	28	7	5	16	31	48	−17	26	
13	Bátaszék SE	28	5	5	18	31	60	−29	20	Relegation
14	Mohácsi TE	28	5	4	19	34	77	−43	19	Relegation
15	Barcsi SC	28	2	1	25	11	83	−72	7	Relegation

=== Duna group ===
Pos	Team	Pld	W	D	L	GF	GA	GD	Pts	Relegation
1	Érdi Városi SE	30	24	3	3	75	21	+54	75	
2	Dorogi FC	30	20	8	2	51	14	+37	68	
3	Erzsébeti Spartacus MTK LE	30	18	7	5	64	25	+39	61	
4	Újbuda TC	30	16	7	7	58	38	+20	55	
5	Soroksár SC	30	15	6	9	46	26	+20	51	
6	Diósdi TC-SELECT	30	14	6	10	54	39	+15	48	
7	Sárisáp-Tatabányai Alapítvány SK	30	13	9	8	42	37	+5	48	
8	Viadukt SE-Tópark	30	12	10	8	43	35	+8	46	
9	Pénzügyőr SE	30	14	2	14	47	40	+7	44	
10	Százhalombattai LK-investiz	30	9	10	11	48	52	−4	37	
11	Rákosszentmihályi AFC	30	10	3	17	31	51	−20	33	
12	III. Kerületi TUE	30	8	4	18	39	62	−23	28	
13	Budafoki LC	30	8	4	18	27	51	−24	28	
14	Bicskei TC	30	7	7	16	33	51	−18	28	Relegation
15	Lindab-Törökbálinti TC	30	5	4	21	34	79	−45	19	Relegation
16	Gázművek MTE	30	1	2	27	21	92	−71	5	Relegation

=== Mátra group ===
Pos	Team	Pld	W	D	L	GF	GA	GD	Pts	Promotion or relegation
1	Putnok VSE	28	20	5	3	72	30	+42	65	Promotion to Nemzeti Bajnokság II
2	Maglódi TC	28	16	6	6	68	40	+28	54	
3	Vasas SC II (Note: did not participate in any competitions due to the relegation of their first team from the first tier)	28	17	1	10	45	33	+12	52	Relegation
4	Diósgyőri VTK II	28	16	3	9	58	35	+23	51	
5	Rákosmenti KSK-Rojik	28	14	9	5	43	28	+15	51	
6	Turawell-Tura VSK	28	15	5	8	64	39	+25	50	
7	Dunakeszi Vasutas SE	28	12	8	8	59	46	+13	44	Relegation
8	FC Tiszaújváros	28	13	3	12	58	44	+14	42	
9	Felsőtárkány SC	28	12	4	12	44	49	−5	40	
10	Salgótarjáni BTC	28	11	3	14	38	57	−19	36	
11	Ózdi FC	28	10	4	14	38	43	−5	34	
12	Gyöngyösi AK-Ytong	28	8	5	15	32	48	−16	29	
13	FC Hatvan	28	6	7	15	36	58	−22	25	
14	Balassagyarmati VSE	28	4	1	23	22	58	−36	13	Relegation
15	Gyöngyöshalász SE	28	3	2	23	34	103	−69	11	

=== Tisza group ===
Pos	Team	Pld	W	D	L	GF	GA	GD	Pts	Relegation
1	Várda SE	30	24	3	3	78	16	+62	75	
2	Nyírbátori FC	30	20	5	5	76	26	+50	65	
3	Cigánd SE	30	20	4	6	56	36	+20	64	
4	Létavértes SC '97	30	16	9	5	59	26	+33	57	
5	Tiszakanyár SE	30	15	10	5	59	35	+24	55	
6	Hajdúszoboszlói SE	30	16	6	8	51	25	+26	54	
7	SE Kemecse	30	14	4	12	59	42	+17	46	Relegation
8	Nagyecsed RSE	30	13	7	10	49	43	+6	46	
9	Debreceni EAC-Szertár Sportbolt	30	12	10	8	52	40	+12	46	
10	Baktalórántháza VSE	30	12	4	14	62	55	+7	40	
11	Hajdúböszörményi TE	30	10	5	15	57	51	+6	35	
12	Ibrány SE	30	7	5	18	36	58	−22	26	
13	Tiszalök VSE	30	7	4	19	33	72	−39	25	Relegation
14	Kótaj SE	30	5	4	21	28	63	−35	19	Relegation
15	Tuzsér SE	30	5	2	23	28	105	−77	17	Relegation
16	Sárospataki TC	30	3	0	27	19	109	−90	9	Relegation

== See also ==
- 2011–12 Magyar Kupa
- 2011–12 Nemzeti Bajnokság I
- 2011–12 Nemzeti Bajnokság II
