= 2012–13 Nemzeti Bajnokság III =

Nemzeti Bajnokság III
- Season: 2012–13
- Champions: Soroksár (Alföld); Dorog (Bakony); Dunaújváros (Dráva); Budaörs (Duna); Felsőtárkány (Mátra); Kisvárda (Tisza)
- Promoted: Dunaújváros; Kisvárda
- Relegated: 51 teams

The 2012–13 Nemzeti Bajnokság III was Hungary's third-level football competition.

== Standings ==
=== Alföld ===
| Pos | Team | Pld | W | D | L | GF | GA | GD | Pts | Qualification or relegation |
|---|---|---|---|---|---|---|---|---|---|---|
| 1 | Soroksár (C) | 26 | 15 | 7 | 4 | 44 | 20 | +24 | 52 | Qualification to promotion play-offs |
| 2 | Monor | 26 | 15 | 5 | 6 | 52 | 31 | +21 | 50 | |
| 3 | Gyula (O) | 26 | 14 | 6 | 6 | 53 | 23 | +30 | 48 | Qualification for the relegation play-offs |
| 4 | Dunaharaszti (O) | 26 | 13 | 9 | 4 | 41 | 27 | +14 | 48 | Qualification for the relegation play-offs |
| 5 | Tököl (O) | 26 | 13 | 6 | 7 | 39 | 28 | +11 | 45 | Qualification for the relegation play-offs |
| 6 | Dabas (Note: Remained in NB III due to withdrawals.) | 26 | 12 | 4 | 10 | 49 | 38 | +11 | 40 | |
| 7 | Mórahalom (R) | 26 | 11 | 5 | 10 | 45 | 38 | +7 | 38 | Relegation to Megyei Bajnokság I |
| 8 | Vecsés (R) | 26 | 9 | 5 | 12 | 45 | 54 | −9 | 32 | Relegation to Megyei Bajnokság I |
| 9 | Nagykőrös (R) | 26 | 8 | 8 | 10 | 40 | 47 | −7 | 32 | Relegation to Megyei Bajnokság I |
| 10 | Tisza Volán (R) | 26 | 8 | 6 | 12 | 31 | 34 | −3 | 30 | Relegation to Megyei Bajnokság I |
| 11 | Kecskemét II (R) | 26 | 8 | 4 | 14 | 35 | 46 | −11 | 28 | Relegation and not competed in any division next season |
| 12 | Üllő (R) | 26 | 8 | 3 | 15 | 35 | 58 | −23 | 24 (Note: Üllő were deducted 3 points.) | Relegation to Megyei Bajnokság I |
| 13 | Makó (R) | 26 | 4 | 10 | 12 | 30 | 50 | −20 | 22 | Relegation to Megyei Bajnokság I |
| 14 | Hódmezővásárhely (R) | 26 | 3 | 4 | 19 | 16 | 61 | −45 | 13 | Relegation to Megyei Bajnokság I |

Source: Soccerway
(C) Champions; (O) Play-off winners; (R) Relegated

=== Bakony ===
| Pos | Team | Pld | W | D | L | GF | GA | GD | Pts | Qualification or relegation |
|---|---|---|---|---|---|---|---|---|---|---|
| 1 | Dorog (C) | 26 | 17 | 7 | 2 | 57 | 21 | +36 | 58 | Qualification to promotion play-offs |
| 2 | Andráshida | 26 | 18 | 2 | 6 | 44 | 24 | +20 | 56 | |
| 3 | Mosonmagyaróvár (Note: Remained in NB III due to withdrawals.) | 26 | 16 | 6 | 4 | 51 | 20 | +31 | 54 | Qualification for the relegation play-offs |
| 4 | Balatonfüred (O) | 26 | 15 | 5 | 6 | 51 | 24 | +27 | 50 | Qualification for the relegation play-offs |
| 5 | Újbuda (O) | 26 | 15 | 4 | 7 | 55 | 37 | +18 | 49 | Qualification for the relegation play-offs |
| 6 | Körmend | 26 | 13 | 6 | 7 | 57 | 38 | +19 | 45 | Qualification for the relegation play-offs |
| 7 | Répcelak (R) | 26 | 10 | 5 | 11 | 43 | 42 | +1 | 35 | Relegation to Megyei Bajnokság I |
| 8 | Sárvár (R) | 26 | 10 | 5 | 11 | 36 | 45 | −9 | 35 | Relegation to Megyei Bajnokság I |
| 9 | Csorna (R) | 26 | 9 | 4 | 13 | 37 | 37 | 0 | 31 | Relegation to Megyei Bajnokság I |
| 10 | Hévíz (R) | 26 | 8 | 6 | 12 | 34 | 45 | −11 | 30 | Relegation to Megyei Bajnokság I |
| 11 | Nagykanizsa (R) | 26 | 8 | 1 | 17 | 29 | 54 | −25 | 25 | Relegation to Megyei Bajnokság I |
| 12 | Mór (R) | 26 | 4 | 7 | 15 | 29 | 54 | −25 | 19 | Relegation to Megyei Bajnokság I |
| 13 | Pápa II (R) | 26 | 5 | 3 | 18 | 21 | 40 | −19 | 18 | Relegation and not competed in any division next season |
| 14 | Komárom (R) | 26 | 3 | 1 | 22 | 21 | 84 | −63 | 10 | Relegation to Megyei Bajnokság I |

Source: Soccerway
(C) Champions; (O) Play-off winners; (R) Relegated

=== Dráva ===
| Pos | Team | Pld | W | D | L | GF | GA | GD | Pts | Qualification or relegation |
|---|---|---|---|---|---|---|---|---|---|---|
| 1 | Dunaújváros (C, P) | 26 | 21 | 3 | 2 | 86 | 12 | +74 | 66 | Qualification to promotion play-offs |
| 2 | Szekszárd | 26 | 19 | 6 | 1 | 53 | 15 | +38 | 63 | |
| 3 | Nagyatád (O) | 26 | 13 | 5 | 8 | 43 | 43 | 0 | 44 | Qualification for the relegation play-offs |
| 4 | Szentlőrinc (R) | 26 | 13 | 3 | 10 | 52 | 36 | +16 | 42 | Qualification for the relegation play-offs |
| 5 | Pécs II (O, R) | 26 | 12 | 6 | 8 | 53 | 30 | +23 | 42 | Qualification for the relegation play-offs |
| 6 | Bölcske (Note: Remained in NB III due to withdrawals.) | 26 | 12 | 4 | 10 | 50 | 42 | +8 | 40 | |
| 7 | Komló | 26 | 12 | 4 | 10 | 45 | 42 | +3 | 40 | |
| 8 | Bonyhád (R) | 26 | 11 | 7 | 8 | 47 | 45 | +2 | 40 | Relegation to Megyei Bajnokság I |
| 9 | Híd (R) | 26 | 9 | 5 | 12 | 55 | 45 | +10 | 32 | Relegation to Megyei Bajnokság I |
| 10 | Dombóvár (R) | 26 | 8 | 7 | 11 | 43 | 43 | 0 | 31 | Relegation to Megyei Bajnokság I |
| 11 | Siófok II (R) | 26 | 7 | 4 | 15 | 29 | 72 | −43 | 25 | Relegation and not competed in any division next season |
| 12 | Nagybajom (R) | 26 | 5 | 6 | 15 | 26 | 61 | −35 | 21 | Relegation to Megyei Bajnokság I |
| 13 | Balatonlelle (R) | 26 | 4 | 3 | 19 | 22 | 68 | −46 | 15 | Relegation to Megyei Bajnokság I |
| 14 | Tolna (R) | 26 | 2 | 5 | 19 | 23 | 73 | −50 | 11 | Relegation to Megyei Bajnokság I |

Source: Soccerway
(C) Champions; (O) Play-off winners; (P) Promoted; (R) Relegated

=== Duna ===
| Pos | Team | Pld | W | D | L | GF | GA | GD | Pts | Qualification or relegation |
|---|---|---|---|---|---|---|---|---|---|---|
| 1 | Budaörs (C) | 28 | 19 | 4 | 5 | 54 | 22 | +32 | 61 | Qualification to promotion play-offs |
| 2 | ESMTK | 28 | 17 | 6 | 5 | 61 | 26 | +35 | 57 | |
| 3 | Diósd (O) | 28 | 16 | 6 | 6 | 54 | 21 | +33 | 54 | Qualification for the relegation play-offs |
| 4 | Videoton II (O) | 28 | 15 | 6 | 7 | 55 | 30 | +25 | 51 | Qualification for the relegation play-offs |
| 5 | Jászapáti (O) | 28 | 14 | 7 | 7 | 60 | 38 | +22 | 49 | Qualification for the relegation play-offs |
| 6 | Csepel (Note: Remained in NB III due to withdrawals.) | 28 | 12 | 10 | 6 | 42 | 25 | +17 | 46 | |
| 7 | Sárisáp (R) | 28 | 12 | 4 | 12 | 42 | 53 | −11 | 40 | Relegation to Megyei Bajnokság I |
| 8 | Érd (R) | 28 | 11 | 7 | 10 | 44 | 36 | +8 | 40 | Relegation to Megyei Bajnokság I |
| 9 | III. Kerület (R) | 28 | 9 | 9 | 10 | 45 | 38 | +7 | 36 | Relegation to Megyei Bajnokság I |
| 10 | Biatorbágy (R) | 28 | 11 | 6 | 11 | 42 | 36 | +6 | 35 (Note: Biatorbágy were deducted 4 points.) | Relegation to Megyei Bajnokság I |
| 11 | Pénzügyőr (R) | 28 | 10 | 5 | 13 | 35 | 47 | −12 | 35 | Relegation to Megyei Bajnokság I |
| 12 | Százhalombattai LK (R) | 28 | 11 | 4 | 13 | 47 | 56 | −9 | 32 (Note: Százhalombatta were deducted 5 points.) | Relegation to Megyei Bajnokság I |
| 13 | Budafok (R) | 28 | 6 | 3 | 19 | 30 | 72 | −42 | 21 | Relegation to Megyei Bajnokság I |
| 14 | Rákosmenti TK (R) | 28 | 3 | 5 | 20 | 28 | 76 | −48 | 14 | Relegation to Megyei Bajnokság I |
| 15 | Rákosszentmihály (R) | 28 | 2 | 2 | 24 | 26 | 89 | −63 | 8 | Relegation to Megyei Bajnokság I |

Source: Soccerway
(C) Champions; (O) Play-off winners; (R) Relegated

=== Mátra ===
| Pos | Team | Pld | W | D | L | GF | GA | GD | Pts | Qualification or relegation |
|---|---|---|---|---|---|---|---|---|---|---|
| 1 | Felsőtárkány (C) | 26 | 17 | 6 | 3 | 55 | 24 | +31 | 57 | Qualification to promotion play-offs |
| 2 | Hatvan | 26 | 17 | 5 | 4 | 52 | 26 | +26 | 56 | |
| 3 | Rákospalota (O) | 26 | 17 | 3 | 6 | 57 | 25 | +32 | 54 | Qualification for the relegation play-offs |
| 4 | MTK II (O, R) | 26 | 15 | 6 | 5 | 71 | 28 | +43 | 51 | Qualification for the relegation play-offs and not competed in any division next season |
| 5 | Rákosmenti KSK (Note: Remained in NB III due to withdrawals.) | 26 | 13 | 8 | 5 | 58 | 28 | +30 | 47 | Qualification for the relegation play-offs |
| 6 | Maglód (O) | 26 | 14 | 2 | 10 | 58 | 45 | +13 | 44 | Qualification for the relegation play-offs |
| 7 | Salgótarján (R) | 26 | 10 | 7 | 9 | 48 | 45 | +3 | 37 | Relegation to Megyei Bajnokság I |
| 8 | Gyöngyös (R) | 26 | 9 | 7 | 10 | 34 | 36 | −2 | 34 | Relegation to Megyei Bajnokság I |
| 9 | Tura (R) | 26 | 8 | 6 | 12 | 37 | 45 | −8 | 30 | Relegation to Megyei Bajnokság I |
| 10 | Tápiószecső (R) | 26 | 7 | 6 | 13 | 33 | 50 | −17 | 27 | Relegation to Megyei Bajnokság I |
| 11 | Bükkábrány (R) | 26 | 7 | 3 | 16 | 25 | 47 | −22 | 24 | Relegation to Megyei Bajnokság I |
| 12 | Eger II (R) | 26 | 4 | 6 | 16 | 20 | 61 | −41 | 18 | Relegation and not competed in any division next season |
| 13 | Nagybátonyi SC (R) | 26 | 4 | 4 | 18 | 30 | 60 | −30 | 16 | Relegation to Megyei Bajnokság I |
| 14 | Ózd (R) | 26 | 4 | 3 | 19 | 21 | 79 | −58 | 15 | Relegation to Megyei Bajnokság I |

Source: Soccerway
(C) Champions; (O) Play-off winners; (R) Relegated

=== Tisza ===
| Pos | Team | Pld | W | D | L | GF | GA | GD | Pts | Qualification or relegation |
|---|---|---|---|---|---|---|---|---|---|---|
| 1 | Kisvárda (C, P) | 26 | 19 | 6 | 1 | 77 | 15 | +62 | 63 | Qualification to promotion play-offs |
| 2 | Nyírbátor | 26 | 17 | 3 | 6 | 57 | 28 | +29 | 54 | |
| 3 | Tiszaújváros (O) | 26 | 16 | 6 | 4 | 54 | 17 | +37 | 54 | Qualification for the relegation play-offs |
| 4 | Cigánd (O) | 26 | 14 | 6 | 6 | 41 | 27 | +14 | 48 | Qualification for the relegation play-offs |
| 5 | Létavértes (O) | 26 | 15 | 2 | 9 | 52 | 20 | +32 | 47 | Qualification for the relegation play-offs |
| 6 | Hajdúböszörmény (Note: Remained in NB III due to withdrawals.) | 26 | 13 | 5 | 8 | 51 | 44 | +7 | 44 | |
| 7 | Hajdúszoboszló (R) | 26 | 11 | 4 | 11 | 43 | 40 | +3 | 37 | Relegation to Megyei Bajnokság I |
| 8 | Tiszakanyár (R) | 26 | 11 | 3 | 12 | 42 | 45 | −3 | 36 | Relegation to Megyei Bajnokság I |
| 9 | Baktalórántháza (R) | 26 | 10 | 3 | 13 | 37 | 53 | −16 | 33 | Relegation to Megyei Bajnokság I |
| 10 | Szatmár Unió (R) | 26 | 9 | 6 | 11 | 33 | 40 | −7 | 33 | Relegation to Megyei Bajnokság I |
| 11 | Ibrány (R) | 26 | 7 | 7 | 12 | 26 | 34 | −8 | 28 | Relegation to Megyei Bajnokság I |
| 12 | Nagyecsed (R) | 26 | 6 | 5 | 15 | 31 | 52 | −21 | 23 | Relegation to Megyei Bajnokság I |
| 13 | DEAC (R) | 26 | 4 | 1 | 21 | 15 | 58 | −43 | 13 | Relegation to Megyei Bajnokság I |
| 14 | Diósgyőr II (R) | 26 | 1 | 1 | 24 | 17 | 103 | −86 | 4 | Relegation and not competed in any division next season |

Source: Soccerway
(C) Champions; (O) Play-off winners; (P) Promoted; (R) Relegated

== Relegation play-offs ==
The relegation play-offs schedule and pairing were announced on 4 June 2013 between Nemzeti Bajnokság III and Megyei Bajnokság I teams.

=== Overview ===
| Team 1 | Agg. | Team 2 | 1st leg | 2nd leg |
|---|---|---|---|---|
| Balatonfüred | 10–0 | Balatonszárszó | 6–0 | 4–0 |
| Ikarus | 2–16 | Diósd | 2–6 | 0–10 |
| Jászapáti | 9–4 | Úrkút | 5–2 | 4–2 |
| Kiskunfélegyháza | 0–19 | MTK II | 0–10 | 0–9 |
| Maglód | 10–2 | Kecskéd | 8–0 | 2–2 |
| Majos | 3–3 (a) | Mosonmagyaróvár | 1–1 | 2–2 |
| Markaz | 2–7 | Dunaharaszti | 2–2 | 0–5 |
| Nagyatád | 7–0 | Kőszeg | 2–0 | 5–0 |
| Pécsvárad | 4–2 | Szentlőrinc | 4–1 | 0–1 |
| Rákosmenti KSK | 4–5 | Veresegyház | 3–2 | 1–3 |
| Szikszó-Tomor-Lak | 4–13 | Tiszaújváros | 2–4 | 2–9 |
| Tápé | 0–5 | Cigánd | 0–3 | 0–2 |
| Tiszafüred | 0–17 | Létavértes | 0–3 | 0–14 |
| Tököl | 3–0 | Kemecse | 1–0 | 2–0 |
| Újbuda | 4–1 | Zalaszentgrót | 2–1 | 2–0 |
| Velence | 3–3 (a) | Pécs II | 1–3 | 2–0 |
| Videoton II | 6–3 | Győrszemere | 4–1 | 2–2 |
| Ebes | 4–1 | Körmend | 1–1 | 3–0 |
| Méhkerék | 0–9 | Gyula | 0–2 | 0–7 |
| Rákospalota | 7–3 | Berkenye | 3–1 | 4–2 |

=== Matches ===
All times Central European Summer Time (UTC+2)

8 June 2013
17:00

| Balatonfüred | 6–0 | Balatonszárszó |
|---|---|---|
| G. Kovács 31', 56', 60'; P. Bognár 69'; A. Babik 77', 86' | Report |

Balatonfüredi FC Sporttelep, Balatonfüred
Attendance: 200
Referee: Norbert Kiss
15 June 2013
17:00

| Balatonszárszó | 0–4 | Balatonfüred |
|---|---|---|
| | Report | Z. Babics 60'; Á. Krén 71'; I. Benedek 85'; D. Boromisza 89' |

Balatonszárszói Sportpálya, Balatonszárszó
Attendance: 300
Referee: Péter Zierkelbach

Balatonfüred won 10–0 on aggregate and therefore both clubs remained in their respective leagues.

8 June 2013
17:00

| Ikarus | 2–6 | Diósd |
|---|---|---|
| K. Horváth 10'; I. Kasinszky 13' | Report | G. Mojzer 29', 71'; Z. Kovács 39', 52'; C. Králik 43'; P. Szabó 68' (o.g.) |

Ikarus BSE Sporttelep, Budapest
Referee: Dr Géza Jakab
15 June 2013
17:00

| Diósd | 10–0 | Ikarus |
|---|---|---|
| G. Mojzer 3', 18', 60', 83', 85'; B. Hegybányai 34'; Fekete 50'; L. Michels 74', 90'; Á. Flórián 79' | Report |

Diósdi TC Sporttelep, Diósd
Referee: István Mészáros

Diósd won 16–2 on aggregate and therefore both clubs remained in their respective leagues.

8 June 2013
17:00

| Jászapáti | 5–2 | Úrkút |
|---|---|---|
| Kotula 19', 29'; Vén 22'; Dragóner 43', 70' | Report | M. Marics 42'; Z. Csörnyei 73' |

Jászapáti Városi Stadion, Jászapáti
Referee: László Lovas
15 June 2013
17:00

| Úrkút | 2–4 | Jászapáti |
|---|---|---|
| T. Korpos 42', 87' | Report | M. Kovács 34'; Kotula 46'; B. Csőke 49', 72' |

Úrkúti Sporttelep, Úrkút
Referee: Gábor Péter Kovács

Jászapáti won 9–4 on aggregate and therefore both clubs remained in their respective leagues.

8 June 2013
17:00

| Kiskunfélegyháza | 0–10 | MTK II |
|---|---|---|
| | Report | Vass 11', 32', 53', 79', 88'; Batizi-Pócsi 15', 72'; Varga 58', 65', 68' |

Honvéd Sporttelep, Kiskunfélegyháza
Attendance: 600
Referee: Zoltán J. Kovács
15 June 2013
17:00

| MTK II | 9–0 | Kiskunfélegyháza |
|---|---|---|
| Á. Huller 11', 32'; D. Gera 41'; Batizi-Pócsi 43', 50', 66', 81'; Asztalos 54'; Baki 65' | Report |

Hidegkuti Nándor Stadion, Budapest
Referee: Eszter Urbán

MTK II won 19–0 on aggregate and therefore both clubs should have remained in their respective leagues however the reserve team decided to not compete in any division next season.

8 June 2013
17:00

| Maglód | 8–0 | Kecskéd |
|---|---|---|
| Weisz 2', 28'; L. Vincze 23', 45'; Lovrencsics 39', 43'; K. Rudolf 79'; Z. Kerner 88' (o.g.) | Report |

Kertész Károly Stadion, Maglód
Attendance: 250
Referee: Mátyás Farkas
15 June 2013
17:00

| Kecskéd | 2–2 | Maglód |
|---|---|---|
| A. Szappanos 35'; B. Földi 57' | Report | P. Baranyai 80'; O. Molnár 90+3' |

Kecskédi Sportpálya, Kecskéd
Referee: Ákos Papp

Maglód won 10–2 on aggregate and therefore both clubs remained in their respective leagues.

8 June 2013
17:00

| Majos | 1–1 | Mosonmagyaróvár |
|---|---|---|
| B. Máté 88' | Report | G. Schmatovich 70' |

Majosi SE Sporttelep, Majos
Attendance: 400
Referee: Béla Botló
15 June 2013
17:00

| Mosonmagyaróvár | 2–2 | Majos |
|---|---|---|
| Z. Kovács 18'; G. Schmatovich 90' | Report | Z. Tálas 13', 43' |

Wittmann Antal park, Mosonmagyaróvár
Referee: Szabolcs Fenyvesi

3–3 on aggregate. Majos won on away goals and were about to be promoted to the Nemzeti Bajnokság III, however they decided to not compete in it, while Mosonmagyaróvár were about to be relegated to the Megyei Bajnokság I, however they remained in NB III due to withdrawals.

8 June 2013
17:00

| Markaz | 2–2 | Dunaharaszti |
|---|---|---|
| Z. Tari 46'; I. Kiss 87' | Report | D. Mészáros 10'; G. Németh 62' |

Markaz Sportpálya, Markaz
Referee: Róbert Nagy
15 June 2013
17:00

| Dunaharaszti | 5–0 | Markaz |
|---|---|---|
| B. Dobesch 4'; D. Mészáros 47', 62'; A. Wágner 51'; G. Dallos 81' | Report |

Dunaharaszti MTK Sporttelep, Dunaharaszti
Attendance: 200
Referee: László Lovas

Dunaharaszti won 7–2 on aggregate and therefore both clubs remained in their respective leagues.

8 June 2013
17:00

| Nagyatád | 2–0 | Kőszeg |
|---|---|---|
| D. Galamb 34'; P. Csongár 40' | Report |

Nagyatádi Mudin Imre Sportcentrum, Nagyatád
Attendance: 500
Referee: Balázs Berke
15 June 2013
17:00

| Kőszeg | 0–5 | Nagyatád |
|---|---|---|
| | Report | V. Nikolić 13', 56', 58'; D. Bezdi 61' (o.g.); P. Csongár 86' |

Lóránt Gyula Sporttelep, Kőszeg
Attendance: 300
Referee: Zoltán J. Kovács

Nagyatád won 7–0 on aggregate and therefore both clubs remained in their respective leagues.

8 June 2013
17:00

| Pécsvárad | 4–1 | Szentlőrinc |
|---|---|---|
| A. Tóth 9'; B. Varga 27', 77'; B. Krapecz 48' | Report | D. Nagy 34' |

Dr. Kófiás Mihály Városi Sporttelep, Pécsvárad
Referee: István Mészáros
15 June 2013
17:00

| Szentlőrinc | 1–0 | Pécsvárad |
|---|---|---|
| M. Hideg 89' | Report |

Szentlőrinci Sportpálya, Szentlőrinc
Referee: Norbert Kiss

Pécsvárad won 4–2 on aggregate and were about to be promoted to the Nemzeti Bajnokság III, however they decided to not compete in it, while Szentlőrinc are relegated to the Megyei Bajnokság I.

8 June 2013
17:00

| Rákosmenti KSK | 3–2 | Veresegyház |
|---|---|---|
| T. Less 25', 63'; I. Kovács 56' | Report | T. Huszai 11'; D. Kozma 58' |

RKSK Sporttelep, Budapest
Referee: Balázs Böcskei
15 June 2013
17:00

| Veresegyház | 3–1 | Rákosmenti KSK |
|---|---|---|
| M. Bogdán 6'; B. Kovács 20'; M. Bánhalmi 90+4' | Report | P. Mohácsi 52' |

Veresegyházi Sporttelep, Veresegyház
Referee: József Berger

Veresegyház won 5–4 on aggregate and are promoted to the Nemzeti Bajnokság III, while Rákosmenti KSK were about to be relegated to the Megyei Bajnokság I, however they remained in NB III due to withdrawals.

8 June 2013
17:00

| Szikszó-Tomor-Lak | 2–4 | Tiszaújváros |
|---|---|---|
| A. Subert 68'; L. Boros 90+1' | Report | G. Molnár 19'; G. Lippai 25'; Z. Dávid 32'; P. Fodor 60' |

Laki Sportpálya, Lak
Referee: László Varga
15 June 2013
17:00

| Tiszaújváros | 9–2 | Szikszó-Tomor-Lak |
|---|---|---|
| P. Kovács 21', 59', 61', 86'; G. Molnár 31', 81'; Z. Dávid 39', 55'; E. Zádori 71' | Report | L. Boros 2'; D. Komjáti 25' |

Tiszaújvárosi Sportcentrum, Tiszaújváros
Referee: János Takács

Tiszaújváros won 13–4 on aggregate and therefore both clubs remained in their respective leagues.

8 June 2013
17:00

| Tápé | 0–3 | Cigánd |
|---|---|---|
| | Report | Z. Varga 7'; M. Boldog 10'; I. Tempfli 26' |

KÉSZ Sport Aréna, Szeged
Attendance: 600
Referee: Zsolt Szabó
15 June 2013
17:00

| Cigánd | 2–0 | Tápé |
|---|---|---|
| Roszel 59'; L. Vicickó 90' | Report |

Tiszakanyár Sportpálya, Tiszakanyár
Attendance: 400
Referee: Ferenc Karakó

Cigánd won 5–0 on aggregate and therefore both clubs remained in their respective leagues.

8 June 2013
17:00

| Tiszafüred | 0–3 | Létavértes |
|---|---|---|
| | Report | Berdó 62', 67', 90' |

Lipcsey Elemér Sporttelep, Tiszafüred
Referee: János Takács
15 June 2013
17:00

| Létavértes | 14–0 | Tiszafüred |
|---|---|---|
| Kertész 4', 13', 75'; P. Kelemen 31', 44'; V. Király 34', 52'; A. Burics 43'; I. Hajdu 58'; T. Nagy 67'; Kinyik 74'; I. Albert 82'; A. Gömze 84'; Á. Suskó 89' | Report |

Létavértesi Sportcentrum, Létavértes
Attendance: 200
Referee: Róbert Nagy

Létavértes won 17–0 on aggregate and therefore both clubs remained in their respective leagues.

8 June 2013
17:00

| Tököl | 1–0 | Kemecse |
|---|---|---|
| L. Langó 72' | Report |

Tököl VSE Sporttelep, Tököl
Attendance: 100
Referee: Gábor Péter Kovács
15 June 2013
17:00

| Kemecse | 0–2 | Tököl |
|---|---|---|
| | Report | L. Radnics 47'; N. Paluska 51' |

Kemecse Sportpálya, Kemecse
Referee: Roland Veizer

Tököl won 3–0 on aggregate and therefore both clubs remained in their respective leagues.

8 June 2013
17:00

| Újbuda | 2–1 | Zalaszentgrót |
|---|---|---|
| A. Németh 65'; G. Kun 90+4' (pen.) | Report | J. Láncz 90+2' (pen.) |

SPORT11 Sport és Szabadidőközpont, Budapest
Attendance: 300
Referee: Gergely Szőts
15 June 2013
17:00

| Zalaszentgrót | 0–2 | Újbuda |
|---|---|---|
| | Report | G. Kun 63'; D. Kovács 83' |

Zalaszentgróti Sporttelep, Zalaszentgrót
Attendance: 900
Referee: Csaba Pintér

Újbuda won 4–1 on aggregate and therefore both clubs remained in their respective leagues.

8 June 2013
17:00

| Velence | 1–3 | Pécs II |
|---|---|---|
| N. Kovács 55' | Report | Kővári 7', 30'; G. Horváth 75' |

Velence Sporttelep, Velence
Referee: Csaba Pintér
15 June 2013
17:00

| Pécs II | 0–2 | Velence |
|---|---|---|
| | Report | I. Pál 8'; N. Kovács 59' |

Stadion PMFC, Pécs
Referee: Balázs Böcskei

3–3 on aggregate. Pécs II won on away goals and therefore both clubs should have remained in their respective leagues however the reserve team decided to not compete in any division next season.

8 June 2013
17:00

| Videoton II | 4–1 | Győrszemere |
|---|---|---|
| Papp 12'; Hudák 45'; Zsótér 70', 75' | Report | Germán 23' |

Pancho Aréna, Felcsút
Referee: Szabolcs Fenyvesi
15 June 2013
17:00

| Győrszemere | 2–2 | Videoton II |
|---|---|---|
| Á. Nyári 19', 33' | Report | T. Molnár 18', 24' |

Győrszemere KSK sporttelep, Győrszemere
Referee: Tibor Gyarmati II

Videoton II won 6–3 on aggregate and therefore both clubs remained in their respective leagues.

9 June 2013
17:00

| Ebes | 1–1 | Körmend |
|---|---|---|
| L. Tóth 45' | Report | T. Niksz 29' |

Ebesi Sporttelep, Ebes
Attendance: 1,000
Referee: Ferenc Karakó
15 June 2013
17:00

| Körmend | 0–3 | Ebes |
|---|---|---|
| Z. Bácsi 53'; L. Tóth 57', 71' | Report |

Papp István Labdarúgó Centrum, Körmend
Attendance: 800
Referee: Béla Botló

Ebes won 4–1 on aggregate and are promoted to the Nemzeti Bajnokság III, while Körmend were about to be relegated to the Megyei Bajnokság I, however they remained in NB III due to withdrawals.

9 June 2013
17:00

| Méhkerék | 0–2 | Gyula |
|---|---|---|
| | Report | G. Nagy 31'; T. Kovács 88' |

Méhkerék Sportpálya, Méhkerék
Attendance: 710
Referee: Gábor Oláh
15 June 2013
17:00

| Gyula | 7–0 | Méhkerék |
|---|---|---|
| Á. Laurinyecz 10', 37'; Cigan 35', 43', 78'; T. Kovács 46'; D. Kondoros 88' | Report |

Christián László Városi Sporttelep, Gyula
Attendance: 750
Referee: Balázs Berke

Gyula won 9–0 on aggregate and therefore both clubs remained in their respective leagues.

9 June 2013
17:00

| Rákospalota | 3–1 | Berkenye |
|---|---|---|
| P. Czimmermann 33'; Kollár 70'; V. Lucz 87' | Report | G. Gulyás 49' |

Budai II. László Stadion, Budapest
Referee: Dániel Becséri
16 June 2013
17:00

| Berkenye | 2–4 | Rákospalota |
|---|---|---|
| T. Fábri 59'; Rusvay 85' | Report | V. Lucz 16'; P. Czimmermann 43'; A. Honti 45'; N. Iflinger 80' |

Berkenye SE Sporttelep, Berkenye
Referee: Ádám Farkas

Rákospalota won 7–3 on aggregate and therefore both clubs remained in their respective leagues.

== See also ==
- 2012–13 Magyar Kupa
- 2012–13 Nemzeti Bajnokság I
- 2012–13 Nemzeti Bajnokság II
