= 2013–14 Nemzeti Bajnokság III =

Nemzeti Bajnokság III
- Season: 2013–14
- Champions: Soroksár (Central); Létavértes (East); Csákvár (West)
- Promoted: Csákvár; Soroksár; Szeged
- Relegated: Andráshida; Ebes; Eger; Ferencváros II; Haladás II; Jászapáti; Komló; Körmend

The 2013–14 Nemzeti Bajnokság III football season had three geographically-based groups (East, Central and West) of sixteen teams. The winners of the groups promoted to next season's Nemzeti Bajnokság II, while the bottom three teams would play next season in the Hungarian County Championship. The 13th-placed teams had to play a qualifier to secure their spot at the third level of Hungarian football.

== Central ==
Pos	Team	Pld	W	D	L	GF	GA	GD	Pts	Promotion or relegation
1	Soroksár (C, P)	30	24	3	3	82	19	+63	75	Promotion to Nemzeti Bajnokság II
2	Szeged (Note: Promoted as the best runner-up out of three group due to the licence problem of Létavértes.) (P)	30	20	7	3	71	29	+42	67	Promotion to Nemzeti Bajnokság II
3	Honvéd II	30	19	5	6	76	41	+35	62	
4	Videoton II	30	16	8	6	51	31	+20	56	
5	Rákosmente	30	15	10	5	62	36	+26	55	
6	Dunaharaszti	30	12	8	10	41	44	−3	44	
7	Gyula	30	12	6	12	41	37	+4	42	
8	Orosháza	30	10	7	13	44	53	−9	37	
9	Baja	30	8	9	13	30	50	−20	33	
10	ESMTK	30	9	5	16	42	56	−14	32	
11	Szekszárd	30	8	8	14	37	51	−14	32	
12	Dabas	30	8	5	17	40	66	−26	29	
13	Monor	30	7	8	15	43	57	−14	29	
14	Bölcske (Note: Bölcske and Maglód remained in NB III due to withdrawals.)	30	6	11	13	42	57	−15	28 (Note: Bölcske were deducted 1 point.)	
15	Maglód	30	6	10	14	38	63	−25	28	
16	Komló (R)	30	2	6	22	15	65	−50	12	Relegation to Megyei Bajnokság I

Source: HFF
Rules for classification: 1) Points; 2) Matches won; 3) Goal difference; 4) Goals scored; 5) Head-to-head points; 6) Head-to-head goal difference; 7) Head-to-head away goals scored; 8) Fair play ranking; 9) Drawing of lots.
(C) Champions; (P) Promoted; (R) Relegated

== East ==
Pos	Team	Pld	W	D	L	GF	GA	GD	Pts	Promotion or relegation
1	Létavértes (Note: NB II licence application of Létavértes was rejected, and Szeged (West), the best runner-up out of three group, were promoted instead.) (C)	30	22	4	4	81	30	+51	70	
2	Kazincbarcika	30	18	8	4	62	30	+32	62	
3	Debrecen II	30	17	6	7	65	38	+27	57	
4	Felsőtárkány	30	16	6	8	54	35	+19	54	
5	Putnok	30	15	6	9	56	38	+18	51	
6	Cigánd	30	14	9	7	56	42	+14	51	
7	Tiszaújváros	30	13	6	11	41	40	+1	45	
8	Nyírbátor	30	12	8	10	49	44	+5	44	
9	Hatvan	30	11	7	12	46	47	−1	40	
10	Hajdúböszörmény	30	9	11	10	45	49	−4	38	
11	Jászapáti (Note: Jászapáti did not submit an entry for NB III.) (R)	30	10	5	15	38	61	−23	35	Relegation to Megyei Bajnokság I
12	Rákospalota	30	7	12	11	39	49	−10	33	
13	Ferencváros II (R)	30	7	7	16	47	47	0	28	Relegation and not competed in any division next season
14	Veresegyház (Note: Veresegyház remained in NB III due to withdrawals.)	30	4	9	17	33	73	−40	21	
15	Ebes (R)	30	6	2	22	29	71	−42	14 (Note: Ebes were deducted 6 points.)	Relegation to Megyei Bajnokság I
16	Eger (Note: Eger were excluded due to insolvency.) (R)	30	4	4	22	20	67	−47	16	Exclution

Source: HFF
Rules for classification: 1) Points; 2) Matches won; 3) Goal difference; 4) Goals scored; 5) Head-to-head points; 6) Head-to-head goal difference; 7) Head-to-head away goals scored; 8) Fair play ranking; 9) Drawing of lots.
(C) Champions; (R) Relegated

== West ==
Pos	Team	Pld	W	D	L	GF	GA	GD	Pts	Promotion or relegation
1	Csákvár (C, P)	30	21	5	4	77	35	+42	68	Promotion to Nemzeti Bajnokság II
2	Budaörs	30	19	3	8	74	32	+42	60	
3	BKV Előre	30	16	7	7	48	25	+23	55	
4	Győr II	30	17	3	10	61	47	+14	54	
5	Andráshida (Note: Andráshida submitted an entry in MB I instead of NB III.) (R)	30	15	8	7	53	31	+22	53	Relegation to Megyei Bajnokság I
6	Csepel	30	13	9	8	46	29	+17	48	
7	Balatonfüred	30	13	8	9	45	31	+14	47	
8	Mosonmagyaróvár	30	12	7	11	40	40	0	43	
9	Újbuda	30	12	6	12	45	43	+2	42	
10	Nagyatád	30	10	8	12	34	39	−5	38	
11	Dorog	30	11	4	15	46	47	−1	37	
12	Haladás II (Note: Haladás II has withdrawn from NB III, and is replaced by Tököl.) (R)	30	9	7	14	39	44	−5	34	Relegation and not competed in any division next season
13	Veszprém	30	8	4	18	35	64	−29	28	
14	Diósd (Note: Diósd and Tököl remained in NB III due to withdrawals.)	30	7	8	15	33	51	−18	28 (Note: Diósd were deducted 1 points.)	
15	Tököl	30	7	2	21	23	74	−51	18 (Note: Tököl were deducted 5 points.)	
16	Körmend (R)	30	5	1	24	29	96	−67	16	Relegation to Megyei Bajnokság I

Source: HFF
Rules for classification: 1) Points; 2) Matches won; 3) Goal difference; 4) Goals scored; 5) Head-to-head points; 6) Head-to-head goal difference; 7) Head-to-head away goals scored; 8) Fair play ranking; 9) Drawing of lots.
(C) Champions; (P) Promoted; (R) Relegated
