= Balázs Slakta =

Hungarian footballer

Personal information
- Date of birth: 1 December 1994 (age 31)
- Place of birth: Eger, Hungary
- Height: 1.93 m (6 ft 4 in)
- Position: Goalkeeper

Team information
- Current team: MTE 1904
- Number: 15

Youth career
- 2009–2011: Debrecen

Senior career*
Years	Team	Apps	(Gls)
2011–2016	Debrecen II	45	(0)
2016–2020	Kaposvár	52	(0)
2020–2021	Szentlőrinc	16	(0)
2021–2022	Budaörs	11	(0)
2022–	MTE 1904	8	(0)
- * Club domestic league appearances and goals as of 21 December 2023

Balázs Slakta (born 1 December 1994) is a Hungarian professional footballer who plays for MTE 1904.

== Career ==
On 28 September 2019, Slakta played his first match for Kaposvár in a 2–0 win against Diósgyőr in the Hungarian League.

== Career statistics ==
As of 14 March 2020.

Appearances and goals by club, season and competition
Club	Season	League			Cup		Continental		Other		Total	
Club	Season	Division	Apps	Goals	Apps	Goals	Apps	Goals	Apps	Goals	Apps	Goals
Debrecen II	2011–12	Nemzeti Bajnokság II	1	0	0	0	—		—		1	0
Debrecen II	2012–13	Nemzeti Bajnokság II	3	0	0	0	—		—		3	0
Debrecen II	2013–14	Nemzeti Bajnokság III	13	0	0	0	—		—		13	0
Debrecen II	2014–15	Nemzeti Bajnokság III	18	0	0	0	—		—		18	0
Debrecen II	2015–16	Nemzeti Bajnokság III	10	0	1	0	—		—		11	0
Debrecen II	Total		45	0	1	0	0	0	0	0	46	0
Kaposvár	2016–17	Nemzeti Bajnokság III	3	0	0	0	—		—		3	0
Kaposvár	2017–18	Nemzeti Bajnokság III	29	0	1	0	—		—		30	0
Kaposvár	2018–19	Nemzeti Bajnokság II	13	0	3	0	—		—		16	0
Kaposvár	2019–20	Nemzeti Bajnokság I	7	0	3	0	—		—		10	0
Kaposvár	Total		52	0	7	0	0	0	0	0	59	0
Career total			97	0	8	0	0	0	0	0	105	0
