= 2015–16 Nemzeti Bajnokság III =

NB III
- Season: 2015–16
- Promoted: Kozármisleny (Central); Nyíregyháza (East); Mosonmagyaróvár (West)
- Relegated: Bölcske (Central); Felsőtarkány (East); Balatonfüred (West)

The 2015–16 Nemzeti Bajnokság III was Hungary's third-level football competition. The group winner and runner-up teams in each of the three groups were promoted, while the best third placed team overall were also promoted.

The championship was won by Ferencváros II, Kozármisleny, and Nyíregyháza. However, Ferencváros II could not be promoted to Nemzeti Bajnokság II since reserve teams could not get promotion to Nemzeti Bajnokság III.

== Standings ==
=== Central ===
Pos	Team	Pld	W	D	L	GF	GA	GD	Pts	Promotion or relegation
1	Kozármisleny (C, P)	32	25	6	1	81	15	+66	81	Promotion to Nemzeti Bajnokság II
2	SZEOL (P)	32	19	6	7	54	25	+29	63	Promotion to Nemzeti Bajnokság II
3	Dabas	32	13	12	7	52	34	+18	51	Possible promotion to Nemzeti Bajnokság II
4	Budafok-Újbuda	32	14	8	10	47	34	+13	50	
5	Pénzügyőr	32	12	10	10	36	30	+6	46	
6	Komló	32	14	7	11	33	34	−1	45 (Note: Komló were deducted 4 points due to lack of players for their U19 and U17 teams.)	
7	Dunaharaszti	32	12	9	11	38	42	−4	45	
8	Szentlőrinc	32	13	5	14	40	44	−4	44	
9	Paks II	32	11	9	12	53	54	−1	42	
10	Honvéd II	32	11	7	14	50	46	+4	40	
11	ESMTK	32	11	6	15	32	40	−8	39	
12	Monor	32	11	6	15	34	43	−9	39	
13	Gyula	32	9	9	14	40	56	−16	36	
14	Békéscsaba II	32	10	5	17	37	50	−13	35	
15	Hódmezővásárhely	32	8	9	15	31	45	−14	33	
16	Szekszárd	32	8	6	18	26	55	−29	30	
17	Bölcske (R)	32	7	8	17	32	69	−37	29	Relegation to Megyei Bajnokság II

Source: HFF
Rules for classification: 1) Points; 2) Matches won; 3) Goal difference; 4) Goals scored; 5) Head-to-head points; 6) Head-to-head goal difference; 7) Head-to-head away goals scored; 8) Fair play ranking; 9) Drawing of lots.
(C) Champions; (P) Promoted; (R) Relegated

=== East ===
Pos	Team	Pld	W	D	L	GF	GA	GD	Pts	Promotion or relegation
1	Nyíregyháza (C, P)	32	27	2	3	74	19	+55	83	Promotion to Nemzeti Bajnokság II
2	Cegléd (P)	32	24	4	4	62	25	+37	76	Promotion to Nemzeti Bajnokság II
3	Cigánd (P)	32	20	6	6	82	40	+42	66	Possible promotion to Nemzeti Bajnokság II
4	Putnok	32	18	5	9	58	37	+21	59	
5	Hatvan	32	18	1	13	48	36	+12	55	
6	Kazincbarcika	32	15	10	7	56	32	+24	55	
7	Rákosmente	32	14	9	9	70	48	+22	51	
8	Jászberény	32	12	7	13	57	45	+12	43	
9	Somos	32	12	5	15	37	50	−13	41	
10	Újpest II	32	12	5	15	34	62	−28	41	
11	Debrecen II	32	11	6	15	46	48	−2	39	
12	Diósgyőr II	32	11	4	17	38	48	−10	37	
13	Tállya	32	6	7	19	31	54	−23	25	
14	Nyírbátor	32	6	7	19	30	68	−38	25	
15	Tiszaújváros	32	5	10	17	24	52	−28	25	
16	Rákospalota	32	6	6	20	36	73	−37	24	
17	Felsőtárkány (R)	32	5	6	21	28	74	−46	21	Relegation to Megyei Bajnokság I

Source: HFF
Rules for classification: 1) Points; 2) Matches won; 3) Goal difference; 4) Goals scored; 5) Head-to-head points; 6) Head-to-head goal difference; 7) Head-to-head away goals scored; 8) Fair play ranking; 9) Drawing of lots.
(C) Champions; (P) Promoted; (R) Relegated

=== West ===
Pos	Team	Pld	W	D	L	GF	GA	GD	Pts	Promotion or relegation
1	Ferencváros II (Note: The reserve team of an NB I team was not eligible for promotion.) (C)	32	22	6	4	65	26	+39	72	
2	Mosonmagyaróvár (P)	32	21	6	5	72	34	+38	69	Promotion to Nemzeti Bajnokság II
3	Dorog (P)	32	20	8	4	44	16	+28	68	Promotion to Nemzeti Bajnokság II
4	Győr	32	16	9	7	60	33	+27	57	
5	Tatabánya	32	17	4	11	55	40	+15	55	
6	Videoton II	32	16	5	11	70	50	+20	53	
7	Andráshida	32	14	8	10	49	38	+11	50	
8	BKV Előre	32	13	8	11	49	39	+10	47	
9	MTK II	32	13	7	12	44	46	−2	46	
10	Érd	32	12	8	12	47	47	0	44	
11	Puskás Akadémia II	32	11	6	15	56	53	+3	39	
12	III. Kerület	32	11	6	15	47	55	−8	39	
13	Diósd	32	11	6	15	39	48	−9	36 (Note: Diósd were deducted 3 points.)	
14	Csepel	32	7	5	20	27	71	−44	26	
15	Csorna	32	6	3	23	26	62	−36	21	
16	Sárvár	32	4	8	20	28	76	−48	20	
17	Balatonfüred (R)	32	4	5	23	26	70	−44	12 (Note: Balatonfüred were deducted 5 points due to lack of players for their youth system teams.)	Relegation to Megyei Bajnokság I

Source: HFF
Rules for classification: 1) Points; 2) Matches won; 3) Goal difference; 4) Goals scored; 5) Head-to-head points; 6) Head-to-head goal difference; 7) Head-to-head away goals scored; 8) Fair play ranking; 9) Drawing of lots.
(C) Champions; (P) Promoted; (R) Relegated

== See also ==
- 2015–16 Magyar Kupa
- 2015–16 Nemzeti Bajnokság I
- 2015–16 Nemzeti Bajnokság II
