= 2009–10 Nemzeti Bajnokság III =

Nemzeti Bajnokság III
- Season: 2009–10
- Champions: Orosháza FC (Alföld); Veszprém FC (Bakony); Bajai LSE (Dráva); Újpest FC II (Duna); Ferencvárosi TC II (Mátra); Kemecse SE (Tisza)
- Promoted: Orosháza FC (Alföld); Veszprém FC (Bakony); Bajai LSE (Dráva); Újpest FC II (Duna); Ferencvárosi TC II (Mátra)

The 2009–10 Nemzeti Bajnokság III season was the 29th edition of the Nemzeti Bajnokság III.

== League tables ==
=== Alföld group ===
Pos	Team	Pld	W	D	L	GF	GA	GD	Pts	Promotion or relegation
1	Orosháza FC	24	14	5	5	61	32	+29	47	Promotion to Nemzeti Bajnokság II
2	Szolnoki Spartacus SK	24	14	4	6	36	29	+7	46	
3	Erzsébeti SMTK	24	13	1	10	41	31	+10	40	
4	Tisza Volán SC	24	11	6	7	34	28	+6	39	
5	Kecskeméti TE II	24	11	5	8	47	39	+8	38	
6	Vasas SC II	24	10	6	8	35	33	+2	36	
7	Hódmezővásárhely FC	24	9	4	11	27	37	−10	31	
8	Monor SE	24	8	6	10	33	31	+2	30	
9	Soroksár SC	24	8	6	10	30	29	+1	30	
10	Százhalombattai LK	24	8	5	11	33	42	−9	29	
11	FC Dabas	24	9	1	14	26	42	−16	28	
12	Várfürdő-Gyulai TFC	24	7	5	12	31	36	−5	26	
13	Battonyai TK	24	5	4	15	29	54	−25	19	Relegation to Megyei Bajnokság I
14	Algyő SK (Note: Withdrew)	0	0	0	0	0	0	0	0	Relegation to Megyei Bajnokság I

=== Bakony group ===
Pos	Team	Pld	W	D	L	GF	GA	GD	Pts	Promotion or relegation
1	Veszprém FC	26	21	5	0	73	16	+57	68	Promotion to Nemzeti Bajnokság II
2	Lipót Pékség SK	26	17	3	6	49	24	+25	54	
3	Soproni VSE-GYSEV	26	13	8	5	29	12	+17	47	
4	Szombathelyi Haladás II	26	13	6	7	48	29	+19	45	
5	Első Mosonmagyaróvári TE 1904	26	13	5	8	31	26	+5	44	
6	Csornai SE	26	12	8	6	31	32	−1	44	
7	Sárvári FC	26	9	8	9	23	32	−9	35	
8	Lombard Pápa Termál FC II	26	8	6	12	30	34	−4	30	
9	Celldömölki VSE-Mávépcell	26	8	6	12	32	38	−6	30	
10	Badacsonytomaji SE	26	7	9	10	37	37	0	30	
11	Körmendi FC-Boldizsár Trans	26	7	6	13	26	40	−14	27	Relegation to Megyei Bajnokság I
12	Répcelaki SE	26	6	5	15	25	48	−23	23	
13	Csesztreg KSE-Femat	26	3	6	17	25	55	−30	15	Relegation to Megyei Bajnokság I
14	Büki TK	26	2	5	19	22	58	−36	11	

=== Dráva group ===
Pos	Team	Pld	W	D	L	GF	GA	GD	Pts	Promotion or relegation
1	Bajai LSE-Kalo-MÉH	26	21	4	1	64	7	+57	67	Promotion to Nemzeti Bajnokság II
2	Nagyatádi FC	26	15	5	6	60	31	+29	50	
3	Szentlőrinc-PVSK SE	26	14	7	5	47	23	+24	49	
4	Paksi FC II	26	13	7	6	60	25	+35	46	
5	Dombóvári FC-Rutin	26	14	3	9	41	34	+7	45	
6	Nagykanizsai TE 1866-Horváth MÉH	26	12	5	9	37	35	+2	41	
7	Tolle UFC Szekszárd	26	10	5	11	32	35	−3	35	
8	Pogány-Pólótransz SE	26	10	3	13	32	41	−9	33	
9	Kaposvári Rákóczi FC II	26	9	6	11	41	47	−6	33	
10	Bogád SE	26	9	4	13	34	46	−12	31	
11	Ócsárd SE	26	6	8	12	36	55	−19	26	Relegation to Megyei Bajnokság I
12	Mohácsi TE	26	4	9	13	29	49	−20	21	
13	Komlói Bányász SK	26	5	5	16	30	55	−25	20	
14	Várpalotai Bányász SK	26	3	3	20	23	83	−60	7 (Note: 5 points deducted)	Relegation to Megyei Bajnokság I

=== Duna group ===
Pos	Team	Pld	W	D	L	GF	GA	GD	Pts	Promotion
1	Újpest FC "B"	26	19	1	6	74	27	+47	58	Promotion to Nemzeti Bajnokság II
2	Dunaharaszti MTK	26	15	9	2	61	27	+34	54	
3	Érdi VSE	26	17	2	7	63	33	+30	53	
4	Újbuda TC	26	15	3	8	54	44	+10	48	
5	Tököli VSK	26	13	7	6	43	24	+19	46	
6	Lindab-Törökbálinti TC	26	13	4	9	48	40	+8	43	
7	Csepel FC	26	10	5	11	42	38	+4	35	
8	Móri SE	26	10	5	11	49	50	−1	35	
9	Rákosmenti KSK-Rojik	26	8	7	11	36	40	−4	31	
10	Dorogi FC	26	9	1	16	39	59	−20	28	
11	Pénzügyőr SE	26	6	9	11	37	48	−11	27	
12	Zsámbéki SK	26	6	3	17	27	63	−36	21	
13	Sárisáp-Sikér SE	26	5	6	15	25	56	−31	21	
14	Budafoki LC	26	1	8	17	12	61	−49	11	

=== Mátra group ===
Pos	Team	Pld	W	D	L	GF	GA	GD	Pts	Promotion
1	Ferencvárosi TC II	26	19	2	5	76	28	+48	59	Promotion to Nemzeti Bajnokság II
2	Maglódi TC	26	16	6	4	60	22	+38	54	
3	Putnok VSE	26	15	4	7	51	37	+14	49	
4	Balmazújvárosi FC	26	13	5	8	43	35	+8	44	
5	Egri FC	26	12	5	9	42	22	+20	41	
6	Balassagyarmati VSE-Nógrád Volán	26	12	5	9	35	26	+9	41	
7	Tura VSK-BioTech USA	26	12	4	10	50	34	+16	40	
8	Jászberényi SE	26	11	4	11	47	47	0	37	
9	Hevesi LSC Ro-Geo Global	26	10	5	11	42	48	−6	35	
10	Püspökladányi LE	26	7	8	11	31	41	−10	29	
11	Gyöngyösi AK-YTONG	26	5	11	10	27	41	−14	26	
12	Ózd FC	26	5	4	17	34	71	−37	19	
13	Rákosszentmihályi AFC	26	5	4	17	24	68	−44	19	
14	Dunakeszi Vasutas SE	26	5	3	18	27	69	−42	18	

=== Tisza group ===
Pos	Team	Pld	W	D	L	GF	GA	GD	Pts	Relegation
1	Kemecse SE	26	17	4	5	46	22	+24	55	
2	Tiszakanyár SE	26	15	6	5	65	38	+27	51	
3	Létavértes SC '97	26	15	6	5	53	27	+26	51	
4	Nyíregyháza Spartacus FC II	26	13	6	7	38	28	+10	45	Relegation to Megyei Bajnokság I
5	Nagyecsed Rákóczi SE	26	12	6	8	41	28	+13	42	
6	Cigánd SE	26	12	5	9	48	40	+8	41	
7	Diósgyőri VTK II	26	12	4	10	43	38	+5	40	
8	Balkányi SE	26	10	4	12	30	41	−11	34	
9	Nyírmadai ISE	26	9	7	10	38	28	+10	34	
10	Tuzsér SE	26	7	12	7	34	36	−2	33	
11	Ibrány SE	26	7	7	12	33	43	−10	28	
12	Kótaj SE	26	4	5	17	26	66	−40	16 (Note: 1 point deducted)	
13	Tiszalök VSE	26	5	6	15	27	46	−19	15 (Note: 6 points deducted)	
14	Berettyóújfalui SE	26	2	6	18	20	61	−41	12	

== See also ==
- 2009–10 Magyar Kupa
- 2009–10 Nemzeti Bajnokság I
- 2009–10 Nemzeti Bajnokság II
