= 2012–13 Nemzeti Bajnokság II =

Nemzeti Bajnokság II
- Season: 2012–13
- Champions: Puskás Akadémia (West); Mezőkövesd (East)
- Matches: 7
- Goals: 29 (4.14 per match)
- Biggest home win: Békéscsaba 6–4 Cegléd
- Biggest away win: Kazincbarcika 1–3 Vác
- Highest scoring: Békéscsaba 6–4 Cegléd
- Longest winning run: 6 teams (1 games)
- Longest unbeaten run: 8 teams (1 games)
- Longest winless run: 8 teams (1 games)
- Longest losing run: 6 teams (1 games)

The 2012–2013 Nemzeti Bajnokság II was the 115th season of the Nemzeti Bajnokság II, the second tier of the Hungarian football league.

Zalaegerszeg and Vasas finished the 2011–12 season in the bottom two places of the table and thus were relegated to their respective NB II divisions. Vasas ended an 8-year stay in the top league. Zalaegerszeg ended an 18-year stay in the top league. The two relegated teams were replaced with the champions of the two 2011–12 NB II groups, Eger of the East Group and MTK of the West Group. MTK made their immediate comeback to the league, while Eger returned to the competition after an absence of 26 seasons.

== Eastern group ==
=== Stadium and locations ===
Location of teams in 2011–12 Nemzeti Bajnokság II

Club	Short name	City	Stadium	Capacity
Balmazújvárosi FC	Balmazújváros	Balmazújváros	Batthyány utcai Sportpálya	2,300
Békéscsaba 1912 Előre SE	Békéscsaba	Békéscsaba	Kórház utcai stadion	10,432
Budapest Honvéd FC II	Honvéd II	Budapest	Bozsik Stadion (Training)	700
Ceglédi VSE	Cegléd	Cegléd	Malomtó széli Stadion	4,000
Debreceni VSC II	Debrecen II	Debrecen	DEAC Stadion	3,200
Ferencvárosi TC II	FTC II	Budapest	Stadion Albert Flórián	15,804
Kazincbarcikai SC	Kazincbarcika	Kazincbarcika	Pete András Stadion	3,000
Mezőkövesd-Zsóry SE	Mezőkövesd	Mezőkövesd	Városi Stadion	2,571
Nyíregyháza Spartacus	Nyíregyháza	Nyíregyháza	Városi Stadion	10,300
Orosháza FC	Orosháza	Orosháza	Mátrai- Stadion	3,000
Putnok VSE	Putnok	Putnok	Stadium Állomás Street	3,000
Szeged 2011	Szeged	Szeged	Szegedi VSE Stadion	5,000
Szolnoki MÁV FC	Szolnok	Szolnok	Tiszaligeti Stadion	4,000
Újpest FC II	Újpest II	Budapest	Szusza Ferenc Stadium	13,501
Vasas SC	Vasas	Budapest	Stadion Rudolf Illovszky	18,000
Dunakanyar-Vác FC	Vác	Vác	Városi Stadion	9,000

=== League table ===
Pos	Team	Pld	W	D	L	GF	GA	GD	Pts	Promotion or relegation
1	Mezőkövesd (C, P)	30	18	4	8	60	36	+24	58	Promotion to Nemzeti Bajnokság I
2	Vasas	30	17	4	9	49	34	+15	55	
3	Békéscsaba	30	15	10	5	58	38	+20	55	
4	Balmazújváros	30	14	8	8	50	37	+13	50	
5	Nyíregyháza	30	15	4	11	44	33	+11	49	
6	Szolnok (O)	30	14	6	10	54	41	+13	48	Qualification to relegation play-offs
7	Szeged (R)	30	11	9	10	43	41	+2	42	Qualification to relegation play-offs
8	Ferencváros II (R)	30	12	5	13	49	49	0	41	Relegation to Nemzeti Bajnokság III
9	Cegléd (O)	30	11	9	10	50	47	+3	40 (Note: Cegléd were deducted 2 points.)	Qualification to relegation play-offs
10	Orosháza (R)	30	12	3	15	51	57	−6	39	Relegation to Nemzeti Bajnokság III
11	Újpest II (R)	30	11	5	14	43	49	−6	38	Relegation to Nemzeti Bajnokság III
12	Honvéd II (R)	30	11	5	14	48	56	−8	38	Relegation to Nemzeti Bajnokság III
13	Putnok (R)	30	9	8	13	43	51	−8	35	Relegation to Nemzeti Bajnokság III
14	Debrecen II (R)	30	8	6	16	49	58	−9	30	Relegation to Nemzeti Bajnokság III
15	Kazincbarcika (R)	30	8	6	16	40	63	−23	30	Relegation to Nemzeti Bajnokság III
16	Vác (R)	30	6	4	20	22	63	−41	22	Relegation to Nemzeti Bajnokság III

Source: soccerway.com
Rules for classification: 1st points; 2nd overall wins; 3rd goal difference; 4th goals scored
(C) Champions; (O) Play-off winners; (P) Promoted; (R) Relegated

=== Results ===
Home \ Away	BAL	BÉK	BHA	CEG	DEB	FTC	KAZ	MEZ	NYÍ	ORO	PUT	SZE	SZL	UTE	VAS	VÁC
Balmazújváros			2–2	1–2	3–1			2–1	2–0			4–1		2–2	1–2	0–2
Békéscsaba	1–1			6–4	5–2	2–1	3–0	2–4	1–1				2–3	2–0		1–1
Honvéd II	2–1	1–2			0–1	0–0	1–2				3–2	2–1	2–0			
Cegléd		2–2	2–2					1–0	1–0	5–1	1–3	1–1			1–1	
Debrecen II	0–2		5–1	1–1				1–1	2–1	5–2		1–1			3–0	1–2
Ferencváros II	2–3	1–3		5–4	1–1		1–1		1–3				1–0			1–0
Kazincbarcika	0–1			0–2	1–0	4–2		2–3	1–2		3–0			2–0	1–0	1–3
Mezőkövesd			1–2			3–2			2–0	0–1	0–0	2–1	3–1		1–0	
Nyíregyháza			3–2			1–0		0–3		2–1	1–1	1–1	1–1	2–1	2–0	
Orosháza	1–1	0–1	3–1		1–0	4–1	2–1				1–2		3–1	3–1		1–0
Putnok	2–1	1–4			3–1	1–2	2–3						2–1		2–3	2–2
Szeged		0–0	3–2	0–0		1–5	2–1			1–1	4–1		0–1	3–1		1–1
Szolnok	2–0	0–0		1–1	2–1		2–2	1–2						2–1		
Újpest II			1–2		2–1	1–2		3–0	2–0	3–1	2–1		2–1			3–2
Vasas		1–1	2–0	3–1		1–0		2–3		6–3	1–1	2–1	1–0	2–0		
Vác			2–3	1–0				1–0	2–1	0–2		3–3			0–1	

Updated to match(es) played on 24 March 2013. Source: (in Hungarian)
Legend: Blue = home team win; Yellow = draw; Red = away team win.

== Western group ==
=== Stadium and locations ===
Location of teams in 2012–13 Nemzeti Bajnokság II

Club	Short name	City	Stadium	Capacity
FC Ajka	Ajka	Ajka	Stadium Város	5,000
Bajai LSE	Baja	Baja	Stadium Város	700
BKV Előre SC	Budapest	Budapest	Stadium Sport Street	2,500
Csákvári TK	Csákvár	Csákvár	Tersztyánszky Ödön Stadium	2,500
Gyirmót SE	Gyirmót	Győr	Ménfői út	2,700
Győri ETO FC II	Győr II	Győr	ETO Park (Training)	1,000
Kaposvári Rákóczi FC II	Kaposvár II	Kaposvár	Stadium Cseri Street	2,000
Kozármisleny SE	Kozármisleny	Kozármisleny	Stadium Alkotmány Square	1,500
Paksi SE II	Paks II	Paks	Stadium Atomerőmű	3,500
Puskás FC	Puskás	Felcsút	Felcsúti Sportkomplexum	3,000
Soproni VSE	Sopron	Sopron	Stadium Káposztás Street	5,800
Szigetszentmiklósi TK	Szigetszentmiklós	Szigetszentmiklós	Stadium Sport Street	1,200
Szombathelyi Haladás II	Szombathely II	Szombathely	Rohonci Street Stadium	9,500
FC Tatabánya	Tatabánya	Tatabánya	Stadion Városi	5,021
Veszprém FC	Veszprém	Veszprém	Stadion Városi	4,000
Zalaegerszegi TE	ZTE	Zalaegerszeg	ZTE Arena	9,300

=== League table ===
Pos	Team	Pld	W	D	L	GF	GA	GD	Pts	Promotion or relegation
1	Puskás Akadémia (C, P)	30	21	7	2	57	18	+39	70	Promotion to Nemzeti Bajnokság I
2	Kozármisleny	30	18	6	6	55	28	+27	60	
3	Gyirmót	30	17	5	8	57	39	+18	56	
4	Zalaegerszeg	30	15	6	9	50	35	+15	51	
5	Ajka	30	14	9	7	36	27	+9	51	
6	Tatabánya (O)	30	14	8	8	46	32	+14	50	Qualification to relegation play-offs
7	Szigetszentmiklós (O)	30	14	4	12	50	43	+7	46	Qualification to relegation play-offs
8	Sopron	30	13	7	10	45	39	+6	46	Qualification to relegation play-offs
9	Csákvár (R)	30	13	5	12	41	40	+1	44	Relegation to Nemzeti Bajnokság III
10	Haladás II (R)	30	11	9	10	41	43	−2	42	Relegation to Nemzeti Bajnokság III
11	Veszprém (R)	30	9	9	12	51	51	0	36	Relegation to Nemzeti Bajnokság III
12	BKV Előre (R)	30	9	6	15	36	54	−18	33	Relegation to Nemzeti Bajnokság III
13	Kaposvár II (R)	30	6	8	16	29	50	−21	26	Relegation to Nemzeti Bajnokság III
14	Győr II (R)	30	6	7	17	40	51	−11	25	Relegation to Nemzeti Bajnokság III
15	Baja (R)	30	5	2	23	29	75	−46	17	Relegation to Nemzeti Bajnokság III
16	Paks II (R)	30	4	4	22	21	59	−38	16	Relegation to Nemzeti Bajnokság III

Source: soccerway.com
Rules for classification: 1st points; 2nd overall wins; 3rd goal difference; 4th goals scored
(C) Champions; (O) Play-off winners; (P) Promoted; (R) Relegated

== Relegation play-offs ==
=== Overview ===
Team 1	Agg.	Team 2	1st leg	2nd leg
Dorog	1–7	Szigetszentmiklós	0–6	1–1
Dunaújváros	2–1	Sopron	1–1	1–0
Felsőtárkány	1–11	Szolnok	0–1	1–10
Kisvárda	4–1	Szeged	1–1	3–0
Soroksár	2–6	Cegléd	0–3	2–3
Tatabánya	7–3	Budaörs	4–2	3–1

=== Matches ===
All times Central European Summer Time (UTC+2)

8 June 2013
17:00

Dorog	0–6	Szigetszentmiklós
	Report	Miloš 7'; Takács 14', 60', 67'; Zsivóczky 30'; Khous 45'

Buzánszky Jenő Stadion, Dorog
Attendance: 500
Referee: József Erdős
15 June 2013
17:00

Szigetszentmiklós	1–1	Dorog
Takács 14'	Report	Z. Tóth 56'

Sport utcai stadion, Szigetszentmiklós
Attendance: 500
Referee: László Varga

Szigetszentmiklós won 7–1 on aggregate and therefore both clubs remained in their respective leagues.

8 June 2013
17:00

Dunaújváros	1–1	Sopron
Böőr 77'	Report	Varga 16'

Dunaújvárosi Stadion, Dunaújváros
Attendance: 2,020
Referee: Viktor Kassai
15 June 2013
17:00

Sopron	0–1	Dunaújváros
	Report	Sitku 33'

Káposztás utcai Stadion, Sopron
Attendance: 4,000
Referee: Sándor Andó-Szabó

Dunaújváros won 2–1 on aggregate and are promoted to the Nemzeti Bajnokság II, while Sopron were about to be relegated to the Nemzeti Bajnokság III, however they took over the vacant place of Eger.

8 June 2013
17:00

Felsőtárkány	0–1	Szolnok
	Report	R. Bohner 88'

Szentmarjay Tibor Városi Stadion, Eger
Attendance: 500
Referee: István Vad
15 June 2013
17:00

Szolnok	10–1	Felsőtárkány
Á. Rokszin 27', 79'; R. Bohner 28', 87'; Vári 43'; Busai 63'; Mile 66'; Balogh 71', 74'; Antal 88'	Report	Z. Vágó 84'

Tiszaligeti Stadion, Szolnok
Attendance: 800
Referee: Gábor Oláh

Szolnok won 11–1 on aggregate and therefore both clubs remained in their respective leagues.

8 June 2013
17:00

Kisvárda	1–1	Szeged
S. Marković 52' (o.g.)	Report	Lakatos 30' (o.g.)

Várkerti Stadion, Kisvárda
Attendance: 1,500
Referee: Péter Solymosi
15 June 2013
17:00

Szeged	0–3	Kisvárda
	Report	Miskolczi 7'; Kapić 64' (o.g.); T. Soós 90+11'

Szegedi VSE Stadion, Szeged
Attendance: 3,000
Referee: Ádám Németh

Kisvárda won 4–1 on aggregate and are promoted to the Nemzeti Bajnokság II, while Szeged are relegated to the Nemzeti Bajnokság III.

8 June 2013
17:00

Soroksár	0–3	Cegléd
	Report	Rebryk 5'; Kormos 9'; Farkas 55'

Szamosi Mihály Sporttelep, Budapest
Attendance: 500
Referee: Ádám Farkas
15 June 2013
17:00

Cegléd	3–2	Soroksár
Balog 43'; Kormos 61'; T. Kiss 82'	Report	Urbán 4'; Márkus 8'

Malomtó széli stadion, Cegléd
Attendance: 700
Referee: Ádám Radványi

Cegléd won 6–2 on aggregate and therefore both clubs remained in their respective leagues.

8 June 2013
17:00

Tatabánya	4–2	Budaörs
Hegedűs 27'; Đurić 36'; Oláh 60'; I. Kovács 85'	Report	G. Lőrincz 48'; Lattenstein 67'

Városi Stadion, Tatabánya
Attendance: 600
Referee: Tamás Bognár
15 June 2013
17:00

Budaörs	1–3	Tatabánya
Sánta 88'	Report	Móri 31'; Weitner 48', 84'

Városi Stadion, Budaörs
Attendance: 500
Referee: Zsolt Szabó

Tatabánya won 7–3 on aggregate and therefore both clubs remained in their respective leagues.

== See also ==
- 2012–13 Magyar Kupa
- 2012–13 Nemzeti Bajnokság I
- 2012–13 Nemzeti Bajnokság III
