= András Winkler =

Hungarian footballer

Personal information
- Date of birth: 9 November 2000 (age 26)
- Place of birth: Mosonmagyaróvár, Hungary
- Height: 1.76 m (5 ft 9 in)
- Position: Winger

Team information
- Current team: Tiszakécske
- Number: 7

Youth career
- Mosonmagyaróvári TE
- Haladás

Senior career*
Years	Team	Apps	(Gls)
2017–2019	Haladás	1	(0)
2017	→ Sopron (loan)	8	(0)
2018–2019	→ MTE (loan)	43	(0)
2019–2020	Bruck/Leitha	13	(1)
2020	Csorna	2	(1)
2020–2021	Lipót	34	(13)
2021–2022	Budaörs	29	(4)
2022–	Tiszakécske	26	(3)

International career
2016	Hungary U17	7	(2)
2016	Hungary U19	2	(0)
- * Club domestic league appearances and goals as of 21 December 2023

András Winkler (born 9 November 2000) is a Hungarian footballer who plays as a winger for Tiszakécske.

== Career ==
=== Bruck/Leitha ===
Ahead of the 2019–20 season, Winkler joined Austrian Regionalliga club ASK-BSC Bruck/Leitha.

=== Tiszakécske ===
On 11 June 2022, Winkler signed with Tiszakécske.
