= Béla Lengyel (football player) =

Hungarian footballer

Personal information
- Date of birth: 29 October 1990 (age 36)
- Place of birth: Szolnok, Hungary
- Height: 1.79 m (5 ft 10 in)
- Position: Attacking midfielder

Team information
- Current team: Budaörs
- Number: 21

Youth career
- 2002–2008: Szolnok

Senior career*
Years	Team	Apps	(Gls)
2007–2016	Szolnok	163	(16)
2008–2009	→ Szolnoki Spartacus (loan)	36	(1)
2016–2017	Kisvárda	0	(0)
2017	Cegléd	10	(0)
2017–2019	Budaörs	65	(16)
2019–2021	Ajka	26	(3)
2021–	Budaörs	22	(0)
- * Club domestic league appearances and goals as of 1 May 2022

Béla Lengyel (born 29 October 1990) is a Hungarian attacking midfielder who plays for Budaörs.

== Career statistics ==
As of 9 August 2020.

Appearances and goals by club, season and competition
Club	Season	League			Cup		Continental		Other		Total	
Club	Season	Division	Apps	Goals	Apps	Goals	Apps	Goals	Apps	Goals	Apps	Goals
Szolnoki Spartacus	2007–08	Nemzeti Bajnokság III	14	1	0	0	—		—		14	1
Szolnoki Spartacus	2008–09	Nemzeti Bajnokság III	22	0	0	0	—		—		22	0
Szolnoki Spartacus	Total		36	1	0	0	0	0	0	0	36	1
Szolnoki MÁV	2007–08	Nemzeti Bajnokság II	1	0	0	0	—		—		1	0
Szolnoki MÁV	2009–10	Nemzeti Bajnokság II	11	3	4	0	—		—		15	3
Szolnoki MÁV	2010–11	Nemzeti Bajnokság I	19	1	0	0	—		3	0	22	1
Szolnoki MÁV	2011–12	Nemzeti Bajnokság II	29	6	2	0	—		—		31	6
Szolnoki MÁV	2012–13	Nemzeti Bajnokság II	24	1	5	0	—		5	0	34	1
Szolnoki MÁV	2013–14	Nemzeti Bajnokság II	23	1	1	0	—		6	0	30	1
Szolnoki MÁV	2014–15	Nemzeti Bajnokság II	30	4	8	1	—		4	0	42	5
Szolnoki MÁV	2015–16	Nemzeti Bajnokság II	26	0	2	0	—		—		28	0
Szolnoki MÁV	Total		163	16	22	1	0	0	18	0	203	17
Cegléd	2016–17	Nemzeti Bajnokság II	10	0	1	0	—		—		11	0
Cegléd	Total		10	0	1	0	0	0	0	0	11	0
Budaörs	2017–18	Nemzeti Bajnokság II	31	7	2	1	—		—		33	8
Budaörs	2018–19	Nemzeti Bajnokság II	34	9	7	3	—		—		41	12
Budaörs	Total		65	16	9	4	0	0	0	0	74	20
Ajka	2019–20	Nemzeti Bajnokság II	22	3	2	3	—		—		24	6
Ajka	2020–21	Nemzeti Bajnokság II	2	0	0	0	—		—		2	0
Ajka	Total		24	3	2	3	0	0	0	0	26	6
Career total			298	36	34	8	0	0	18	0	350	44
