= FC Tiszaújváros =

Hungarian football club

- Full name: Football Club Tiszaújváros
- Founded: 1960; 66 years ago
- Ground: Tiszaújvárosi Sportpark
- Capacity: 4,000
- Manager: Zoltán Vitelki
- League: NB III; Northeast
- 2023–24: NB III; Northeast, 6th of 16
- Website: https://www.fctiszaujvaros.hu/
Home colours

Football Club Tiszaújváros is a professional football club based in Tiszaújváros, Borsod-Abaúj-Zemplén County, Hungary, that competes in the Nemzeti Bajnokság III, the third tier of Hungarian football.

== History ==
Tiszaújváros won the Tisza group of the 1996–97 Nemzeti Bajnokság III season and gained promotion to the second division.

In June 2016, Máté Gerliczki was appointed as the trainer of the club. He said that the goal was to build a team that can solidify their position in the third division. In 2021, Gerliczki resigned.

On 5 June 2021, Attila Uray was appointed as the manager of the club.

On 16 October 2025, Elemér Kondás was appointed as the manager of the club.

== Name changes ==
- 1960–62: Tiszavidéki Vegyi Kombinát Sport Club
- 1962–63: Tiszai Vegyi Kombinát Sport Club
- 1963: merger with Tiszapalkonyai Erőmű Vasas
- 1963–70: Tiszaszederkényi Munkás Testedző Kör
- 1970–79: Leninvárosi MTK
- 1979–89: Olefin Sport Club
- 1989–93: TVK Olefin SC
- 1993–98: Tiszaújvárosi Sport Club
- 1998–2003: Tiszaújvárosi Futball Club
- 2003–05: Tiszaújváros Labdarúgásáért Egyesület
- 2005–13: Football Club Tiszaújváros
- 2013–present: Termálfürdő Football Club Tiszaújváros

== Honours ==
- Nemzeti Bajnokság III:
  - Winners (1): 1996–97

== Seasons ==
The table below shows the seasons of Tiszaújváros.

Season	Tier	Club's name	Position	Pts
1960–61	5	Tiszavidéki Vegyi Kombinát SC	9 / 12	19
1962–63	5	Tiszavidéki Vegyi Kombinát SC	10 / 16	27
1963	5	Tiszaszederkényi MTK	6 / 16	17
1964	5	Tiszaszederkényi MTK	4 / 16	40
1965	5	Tiszaszederkényi MTK	11 / 16	27
1966	5	Tiszaszederkényi MTK	8 / 16	31
1967	5	Tiszaszederkényi MTK	8 / 16	28
1968	5	Tiszaszederkényi MTK	1 / 16	47
1969	4	Tiszaszederkényi MTK	1 / 16	45
1970	3	Leninvárosi MTK	4 / 16	18
1970–71	3	Leninvárosi MTK	12 / 16	24
1971–72	3	Leninvárosi MTK	5 / 16	31
1972–73	3	Leninvárosi MTK	5 / 16	34
1973–74	3	Leninvárosi MTK	15 / 16	17
1974–75	3	Leninvárosi MTK	10 / 20	39
1975–76	3	Leninvárosi MTK	5 / 20	46
1976–77	3	Leninvárosi MTK	5 / 20	40
1977–78	3	Leninvárosi MTK	13 / 20	38
1978–79	2	Leninvárosi MTK	10 / 20	38
1979–80	2	Olefin SC	19 / 20	31
1980–81	3	Olefin SC	3 / 18	47
1981–82	3	Olefin SC	6 / 16	34
1982–83	3	Olefin SC	5 / 16	35
1983–84	3	Olefin SC	2 / 16	39
1984–85	3	Olefin SC	3 / 16	40
1985–86	3	Olefin SC	2 / 16	40
1986–87	3	Olefin SC	13 / 16	26
1987–88	3	Olefin SC	5 / 16	38
1988–89	3	Olefin SC	7 / 16	48
1989–90	3	Olefin SC	12 / 16	34
1990–91	3	Olefin SC	11 / 16	26
1991–92	3	Olefin SC	13 / 16	23
1992–93	3	Olefin SC	11 / 16	28
1993–94	3	Tiszaújvárosi SC	12 / 16	23
1994–95	3	Tiszaújvárosi SE	3 / 16	47
1995–96	3	Tiszaújvárosi SE	2 / 16	66
1996–97	3	Tiszaújvárosi SC	1 / 16	64
1997–98	2	FC Tiszaújváros	18 / 20	36
1998–99	2	FC Tiszaújváros	6 / 20	60
1999–00	2	FC Tiszaújváros	12 / 20	52
2000	2	FC Tiszaújváros	6 / 7	10
2000–01	3	FC Tiszaújváros	5 / 12	30
2001–02	3	FC Tiszaújváros	4 / 13	41
2002–03	3	Tiszaújvárosi FC	12 / 12	8
2002–03	3	Tiszaújvárosi FC	12 / 12	5
2003–04	7	Tiszaújváros	4 / 13	42
2004–05	7	Tiszaújvárosi SC	1 / 12	63
2005–06	5	Tiszaújváros	5 / 16	50
2006–07	5	FC Tiszaújváros	1 / 16	82
2007–08	4	FC Tiszaújváros	1 / 18	78
2008–09	3	FC Tiszaújváros	14 / 16	32
2009–10	4	FC Tiszaújváros	1 / 18	89
2010–11	3	FC Tiszaújváros	4 / 16	58
2011–12	3	FC Tiszaújváros	8 / 15	42
2012–13	3	FC Tiszaújváros	3 / 14	54
2013–14	3	Termálfürdő FC Tiszaújváros	7 / 16	45
2014–15	3	Termálfürdő FC Tiszaújváros	6 / 16	44
2015–16	3	Termálfürdő FC Tiszaújváros	15 / 17	25
2016–17	3	Termálfürdő FC Tiszaújváros	13 / 18	45
2017–18	3	Termálfürdő FC Tiszaújváros	4 / 16	43
2018–19	3	Termálfürdő FC Tiszaújváros	7 / 16	48
2019–20	3	Termálfürdő FC Tiszaújváros	7 / 16	26
2020–21	3	Termálfürdő FC Tiszaújváros	12 / 20	48
2021–22	3	Termálfürdő FC Tiszaújváros	5 / 20	69
2022–23	3	Termálfürdő FC Tiszaújváros	13 / 20	48
2023–24	3	Termálfürdő FC Tiszaújváros	6 / 16	46
2024–25	3	Termálfürdő FC Tiszaújváros	5 / 16	49
2025–26	3	Termálfürdő FC Tiszaújváros	11 / 16	34

== Managers ==
- (Hungary) Máté Gerliczki (2016–2021)
- (Hungary) Attila Uray (5 June 2021-)
- (Hungary) Elemér Kondás
