= Andráshida SC =

Hungarian football club

- Full name: Andráshida Sport Club
- Founded: 1952; 74 years ago
- Ground: Novák Mihály street
- Capacity: 1,850
- League: NB III
- 2017–18: NB III, West, 6th
Home colours

Andráshida Sport Club is a professional football club based in Andráshida, Zalaegerszeg, Hungary, that competes in the Nemzeti Bajnokság III, the third tier of Hungarian football.

== History ==
Andráshida were eliminated from the round of 16 of the 2018–19 Magyar Kupa by Soroksár on 2–4 aggregate.

== Honours ==
=== Domestic ===
- Nemzeti Bajnokság III
  - Runners-up (1): 2012–13

== Seasons ==
As of 16 October 2026.

Season	Tier	Club's name	Position	Pts
1956	4	Andráshida	5 / 14	24
1964	5	Andráshida	5 / 18	34
1965	5	Andráshidai MEDOSZ	4 / 18	36
1966	5	Andráshidai MEDOSZ	1 / 16	40
1967	4	Andráshidai Medosz	16 / 16	20
1968	5	Andráshida	2 / 8	17
1969	5	Andráshidai MEDOSZ	6 / 16	25
1957–58	4	Andráshida	4 / 18	46
1958–59	4	Andráshida	5 / 14	29
1959–60	4	Andráshidai MEDOSZ	10 / 16	31
1960–61	4	Andráshida	6 / 18	30
1961–62	4	Andráshida	7 / 16	27
1962–63	4	Andráshida	2 / 16	45
1963	5	Andráshidai MEDOSZ	2 / 18	22
1998–99	8	Andráshida	6 / 14	40
1999–00	8	Andráshida	1 / 14	65
2000–01	7	Andráshida Recop	2 / 16	70
2001–02	7	Andráshida	1 / 16	75
2002–03	6	Andráshida	1 / 16	77
2003–04	5	Andráshida	2 / 18	83
2004–05	5	Andráshida	1 / 18	88
2005–06	3	Andráshida SC	9 / 16	43
2006–07	3	RECOP Andráshida SC	2 / 14	51
2007–08	3	Andráshida LSC	12 / 18	43
2008–09	4	Kentaur-Andráshida SC	1 / 16	71
2009–10	4	Kentaur-Andráshida SC	2 / 16	62
2010–11	4	Kentaur-Andráshida SC	1 / 16	63
2011–12	4	Tarr Sprint Andráshida SC	1 / 16	71
2012–13	3	Tarr Sprint Andráshida SC	2 / 14	56
2013–14	3	Tarr Sprint Andráshida SC	5 / 16	53
2014–15	4	Tarr Sprint Andráshida SC	1 / 16	75
2015–16	3	Tarr Andráshida SC	7 / 17	50
2016–17	3	Tarr Andráshida SC	10 / 18	43
2017–18	3	Tarr Andráshida SC	6 / 16	48
2018–19	3	Tarr Andráshida SC	16 / 16	27
2019–20	4	Tarr Andráshida SC	4 / 15	32
2020–21	4	Tarr Andráshida SC	1 / 15	70
2021–22	3	Tarr Andráshida SC	20 / 20	11
2022–23	4	Tarr Andráshida SC	8 / 13	28
2023–24	4	Tarr Andráshida SC	8 / 14	34
2024–25	4	Tarr Andráshida SC	13 / 14	15
2025–26	4	Tarr Andráshida SC	9 / 14	35
