= Lak, Hungary =

Lak
- Location of Borsod-Abaúj-Zemplén county in Hungary

- Location of Lak, Hungary
- Coordinates: 48.34773°N 20.86317°E
- Country: Hungary
- County: Borsod-Abaúj-Zemplén

Area
  - Total: 19.76 km^{2} (7.63 sq mi)

Population (2004)
  - Total: 625
  - Density: 31.62/km^{2} (81.9/sq mi)
- Time zone: UTC+1 (CET)
  - Summer (DST): UTC+2 (CEST)
- Postal code: 3786
- Area code: 48

Lak is a village in Borsod-Abaúj-Zemplén county, Hungary.
