= Körmendi FC =

Hungarian football club

- Full name: Körmendi Football Club
- Founded: 1911; 115 years ago
- Ground: MTE pálya
Home colours	Away colours

Körmendi Football Club is a professional football club based in Körmend, Vas County, Hungary, that competes in the Vas county league.

== History ==
The first soccer match took place in Körmend on September 24, 1899, on the meadow behind the Herceg Park (in English: Prince’s Park). A large crowd from our town and the surrounding countryside watched the game unfold. The team from Vasvármegyei SE in Szombathely came to play. The Körmend Athletic Club (KAC) enthusiastically promised at that time that in the spring they would “take up the practice of this fine sport.”

The KFC players were very popular: Gigler, the Fülöp brothers, Grósz, and Steiner. The Rábavidék newspaper reported on the KFC’s results. Most matches were played within the county, and the majority were friendly matches. The club represented the town until 1915, when World War I brought its activities to an end. During that time, the KFC was one of the best teams in the county.

József “Piki” Szabó recalls soccer during the war years as follows: "In the summer of 1917, a small group set out to cross the Rába River to hold a meeting. They learned from Lajos Langler (Zigi) and Lajos Horváth (Púderos) that the legendary KFC’s sports equipment was stored in the doorless attic of the ticket office. They took inventory of the items and founded “MUSI,” the Márton Street Sports Youth Club. Kauz rét was their pitch, and they competed wearing the KFC colors—black and white. Following their example, street sports clubs were formed in Körmend. Only those who could pay 2 Hungarian koronas per game were allowed to play on the teams".

== Name changes ==
- ?-?: Körmendi Testedző Kör
- ?–1945: Körmendi LE
- 1945–1949: Körmendi Testedző Kör
- 1949–1950: Körmendi Építők
- 1950–1951: Körmendi Ládagyári SE
- 1951–1952: Körmendi Ládagyári Építők
- 1952–1970: Körmendi Építők
- 1970: merger with Körmendi Felsőfokú Mezőgazdasági Technikum
- 1970–1973: Körmendi Medosz Technikus Egyetértés
- 1973–1976: Körmendi Főiskola MEDOSZ Technikus Egyetértés
- 1976–?: Körmendi Dózsa FMTE
- ?–?: Körmendi Dózsa Munkás Testedző Egyesület
- ?–1994:Körmendi Football Club
- 1994–?: Körmend Pumtex-Babati Hús FC
- ?–?: Körmendi Football Club
- 2009–2010: Körmendi Football Club-Boldizsár Trans
- 2010–present: Körmendi Football Club

== Honours ==
- Nemzeti Bajnokság III:
  - Winners (1): 1995–96

== Seasons ==
The table below shows the seasons of Körmend FC.

Season	Tier	Club's name	Position	Pts
1923–24	3	Körmendi TK	4 / 8	10
1924–25	3	Körmendi TK	4 / 7	12
1925–26	3	Körmendi TK	7 / 11	17
1931–32	3	Körmendi TK	9 / 11	13
1934–35	3	Körmendi TK	9 / 12	15
1936–37	3	Körmendi TK	4 / 12	24
1937–38	3	Körmendi TK	6 / 10	14
1938–39	4	Körmendi TK	4 / 11	23
1939–40	4	Körmendi TK	7 / 11	18
1941–42	5	Körmendi LE	4 / 10	22
1942–43	5	Körmendi LE	2 / 8	21
1943–44	4	Körmendi LE	5 / 12	25
1944–45	3	Körmendi LE	0 / 10	
1945–46	2	Körmendi TK	9 / 10	-
1946–47	4	Körmendi TK	9 / 14	24
1947–48	4	Körmendi TK	12 / 14	21
1948–49	4	Körmendi TK	6 / 15	24
1949–50	4	Körmendi Építők	4 / 16	39
1950	4	Körmendi Ládagyári SE	3 / 16	21
1951	3	Körmendi Ládagyári Építők	11 / 14	16
1952	3	Körmendi Építők	12 / 14	15
1953	3	Körmendi Építők	12 / 14	21
1954	3	Körmendi Építők	5 / 16	37
1955	3	Körmendi Építők	9 / 14	24
1956	3	Körmend	13 / 14	18
1957–58	4	Körmendi Ládagyár SK	8 / 16	31
1958–59	4	Körmendi Ládagyár	5 / 16	37
1959–60	4	Körmendi Építők	3 / 16	41
1960–61	4	Körmend	8 / 17	31
1961–62	4	Körmend	2 / 17	41
1962–63	4	Körmendi Építők	10 / 17	25
1963	5	Körmend	2 / 15	19
1964	5	Körmend	8 / 18	35
1965	5	Körmendi Építők	2 / 16	44
1966	5	Körmendi Építők	3 / 16	37
1967	4	Körmendi Építők	13 / 16	28
1968	4	Körmendi Építők	12 / 16	27
1969	4	Körmendi Építők	7 / 17	33
1970	4	Körmendi Építők	13 / 16	14
1970–71	4	Körmendi MTE	6 / 16	34
1971–72	4	Körmendi MTE	1 / 16	48
1972–73	3	Körmendi MTE	13 / 16	23
1973–74	3	Körmendi Főiskola MTE	13 / 16	24
1974–75	3	Körmendi FMTE	10 / 20	35
1975–76	3	Körmendi Főiskola MTE	5 / 19	42
1976–77	3	Körmendi Dózsa FMTE	13 / 20	34
1977–78	4	Körmendi Dózsa MTE	1 / 16	48
1978–79	3	Körmendi Dózsa MTE	1 / 16	51
1979–80	2	Körmendi Dózsa MTE	20 / 20	20
1980–81	3	Körmendi Dózsa MTE	2 / 18	52
1981–82	3	Körmendi Dózsa MTE	4 / 18	41
1982–83	3	Körmendi Dózsa MTE	18 / 18	22
1983–84	4	Körmend	3 / 16	41
1984–85	4	Körmendi Dózsa MTE	4 / 16	41
1985–86	4	Körmendi Dózsa MTE	3 / 16	38
1986–87	4	Körmend	2 / 16	43
1987–88	4	Körmend	2 / 16	48
1988–89	4	Körmendi Dózsa MTE	1 / 16	54
1989–90	3	Körmend	12 / 16	36
1990–91	3	Körmend	10 / 16	30
1991–92	3	Körmend	13 / 16	24
1992–93	3	Körmendi FC	9 / 16	26
1993–94	3	Körmendi FC	13 / 16	24
1994–95	3	Babati Hús-Körmend FC	10 / 16	39
1995–96	3	Körmend Pumtex-Babati Hús FC	1 / 16	68
1996–97	3	Körmend-Pumtex	10 / 16	37
1997–98	4	Körmend	16 / 16	13
1998–99	5	Körmend	5 / 16	51
1999–00	5	Körmend	10 / 16	39
2000–01	5	Körmend	9 / 16	34
2001–02	5	Körmend	10 / 16	39
2002–03	5	Körmend FC	5 / 16	43
2003–04	5	Körmend	9 / 18	50
2004–05	5	Körmendi FC	12 / 16	34
2005–06	4	Körmendi FC	12 / 16	40
2006–07	4	Körmendi FC	12 / 16	34
2007–08	4	Körmendi FC	9 / 16	38
2008–09	4	Körmendi FC	1 / 16	66
2009–10	3	Körmendi FC-Boldizsár Trans	11 / 14	27
2010–11	4	Körmendi FC	1 / 16	78
2011–12	3	Körmendi FC	11 / 15	35
2012–13	3	Körmendi FC	6 / 14	45
2013–14	3	Körmendi FC	16 / 16	16
2014–15	4	Körmendi FC	2 / 16	57
2015–16	4	Körmendi FC	1 / 16	85
2016–17	4	Körmendi FC	1 / 16	86
2017–18	4	Körmendi FC	3 / 16	56
2018–19	4	Körmendi FC	2 / 16	57
2019–20	4	Körmendi FC	10 / 16	24
2020–21	4	Körmendi FC	4 / 17	55
2021–22	4	Körmendi FC	10 / 16	30
2022–23	4	Körmendi FC-Vasi Sekolo Kft.	9 / 16	34
2023–24	4	Körmendi FC	13 / 16	26
2024–25	4	Körmendi FC	10 / 13	20
2025–26	4	Körmendi FC	11 / 12	22
