= Mátrai- Stadion =

Football venue in Hungary

Mátrai Sándor Stadion is a sports stadium in Orosháza, Hungary. The stadium is home to the famous association football side Orosháza FC. The stadium has a capacity of 3,000.
