= Bajai LSE =

Hungarian football club

- Full name: Bajai Labdarúgó Sport Egyesület
- Nickname: -
- Founded: 1972
- Ground: Stadium Városi; Baja, Hungary
- Capacity: 2,000
- Chairman: Lajos Búcsú
- Manager: Gábor Goretich
- League: Nemzeti Bajnokság III (Central group)
- 2012–13: Nemzeti Bajnokság II (East), 15th (relegated)
Home colours	Away colours

Bajai LSE is a Hungarian football club located in Baja, Hungary. It currently plays in Hungarian National Championship III. The team's colors are yellow and blue.

== Honours ==
- Nemzeti Bajnokság III:
  - Winners (3): 1957–58, 1981–82, 2009–10

== Managers ==
- Tamás Nagy (2009–2010)
