= Budaörsi SC =

Association football team in Hungary

Budaörs
- Full name: Budaörsi SC
- Nickname: BSC
- Founded: 3 May 1924; 102 years ago
- Ground: Budaörsi Városi Stadion, Budaörs
- Capacity: 1,204
- Chairman: Gábor Argyelán
- Manager: ifj. Bognár György
- League: NB III
- 2022–23: NB III, West, 9th of 20
- Website: https://bsc1924.com/
Home colours	Away colours

Budaörsi SC is a Hungarian football team founded in 1924 and based in Budaörs, a town near Budapest.

Former crest of the club

== History ==
On 14 September 2024, Budaörs were eliminated from the 2024–25 Magyar Kupa season after losing on penalties against Mosonmagyaróvári TE.

== Honours ==
- Nemzeti Bajnokság III
  - Winners (3): 2005–06, 2012–13, 2014–15

== Current squad ==
As of 14 February 2022.

Note: Flags indicate national team as defined under FIFA eligibility rules; some limited exceptions apply. Players may hold more than one non-FIFA nationality.

No.	Pos.	Nation	Player
—	GK	HUN	Martin Dala
—	GK	HUN	Balázs Slakta
—	GK	HUN	Balázs Szabó
—	GK	HUN	Gábor Tóth
—	DF	HUN	Ádám Galambos
—	DF	HUN	András Gyurácz
—	DF	HUN	Gergely Kapronczai
—	DF	HUN	Zsolt Kojnok (on loan from Fehérvár)
—	DF	HUN	Kristóf Papp (on loan from Puskás Akadémia)
—	DF	HUN	Dominik Pintér
—	DF	HUN	Ádám Tányéros
—	MF	HUN	Dárius Csillag
—	MF	HUN	Szabolcs Fényes
—	MF	HUN	Emil Horváth
—	MF	HUN	Gergő Jász
—	MF	HUN	Béla Lengyel
—	MF	HUN	Csaba Molnár

No.	Pos.	Nation	Player
—	MF	HUN	Márk Petneházi
—	MF	HUN	Miklós Sajbán
—	MF	HUN	Keve Tóth
—	MF	HUN	László Zsidai
—	FW	HUN	Zsolt Balázs
—	FW	HUN	Bence Borbás
—	FW	HUN	Boldizsár Gula
—	FW	HUN	Fülöp Halácsi
—	MF	HUN	Barnabás Horváth (on loan from Fehérvár)
—	MF	HUN	Márkó Molnár
—	FW	Kárpátalja	Tibor Molnár
—	FW	HUN	Márk Murai
—	FW	HUN	Imre Vankó
—	FW	HUN	Alexander Váradi
—	FW	HUN	András Winkler
—	FW	HUN	Donát Zsuppán

== Seasons ==
The table below shows the seasons of Budaörs SC.

Season	Tier	Club's name	Position	Pts
1924–25	3	Budaörsi SE	7 / 9	11
1925–26	3	Budaörsi SE	10 / 10	-
1935–36	4	Budaörsi SE	1 / 8	18
1936–37	3	Budaörsi SE	4 / 10	15
1937–38	3	Budaörsi SE	11 / 11	18
1938–39	4	MOVE Budaörsi SE	2 / 11	30
1939–40	3	MOVE Budaörs	6 / 14	32
1943–44	5	Budaörsi MOVE	4 / 6	10
1946–47	5	Budaörsi SE	1 / 4	
1947–48	4	Budaörsi SE	0 / 14	
1948–49	5	Budaörsi MTE	9 / 12	19
1949–50	5	Budaörsi MTE	7 / 12	21
1950 ősz	5	Budaörsi MTE	2 / 11	18
1951	4	Budaörsi SK	0 / 10	
1952	4	Budaörsi KSK	0 / 14	
1957–58	5	Budaörs	11 / 16	26
1958–59	6	Budaörsi SC	2 / 14	18
1959–60	5	Budaörs	6 / 16	30
1960–61	5	Budaörs	2 / 12	34
1961–62	5	Budaörs	2 / 13	35
1962–63	5	Budaörs	4 / 14	30
1963	6	Budaörs	1 / 14	21
1964	6	Budaörs	3 / 13	30
1965	6	Budaörsi SC	2 / 14	36
1966	6	Budaörs	1 / 14	38
1967	5	Budaörs	13 / 16	23
1968	6	Budaörs	2 / 14	35
1969	6	Budaörs	2 / 16	44
1970	5	Budaörs	1 / 8	19
1970–71	5	Budaörs	11 / 16	26
1971–72	5	Budaörs	5 / 16	33
1972–73	5	Budaörs	4 / 16	34
1973–74	5	Budaörsi Sasad TSZ SK	8 / 16	32
1974–75	4	Budaörs	10 / 16	28
1975–76	4	Budaörs	10 / 16	31
1976–77	4	Budaörs	8 / 16	31
1977–78	4	Budaörs Sasad TSz SC	13 / 16	23
1978–79	3	Budaörs	13 / 18	33
1979–80	3	Budaörs	18 / 18	15
1980–81	4	Budaörs	4 / 14	29
1981–82	5	Budaörs	10 / 14	24
1982–83	5	Budaörs	6 / 14	24
1983–84	5	Budaörs	1 / 14	41
1984–85	4	Budaörsi SC	11 / 16	24
1985–86	4	Budaörsi SC	15 / 16	18
1986–87	5	Budaörs	11 / 14	23
1987–88	5	Budaörs	11 / 14	20
1988–89	5	Budaörs	12 / 14	17
1989–90	5	Budaörs	11 / 14	21
1990–91	5	Budaörs	13 / 16	25
1991–92	5	Budaörs	8 / 16	30
1992–93	5	Budaörs	3 / 16	39
1993–94	5	Budaörs	11 / 16	26
1994–95	5	Budaörs	5 / 16	42
1995–96	5	Budaörs	10 / 16	39
1996–97	5	Budaörs	5 / 16	48
1997–98	6	Budaörs	2 / 16	65
1998–99	5	Budaörs	10 / 18	44
1999–00	5	Budaörs	13 / 18	39
2000–01	5	Budaörs	6 / 18	56
2001–02	5	Budaörs	3 / 16	61
2002–03	5	Budaörs	1 / 16	74
2003–04	4	Budaörs	2 / 16	75
2004–05	4	Budaörs	4 / 15	52
2005–06	3	Budaörs SC	1 / 18	76
2006–07	2	Budaörs SC	13 / 16	31
2007–08	2	Budaörsi SC	8 / 16	39
2008–09	2	Budaörsi SC	7 / 16	40
2009–10	2	Budaörsi SC	10 / 15	33
2010–11	2	Budaörsi SC	11 / 16	41
2011–12	2	Budaörsi SC	16 / 16	25
2012–13	3	Budaörsi SC	1 / 15	61
2013–14	3	Budaörsi SC	2 / 16	60
2014–15	3	Budaörsi SC	1 / 16	64
2015–16	2	Budaörsi SC	8 / 16	43
2016–17	2	Budaörsi SC	15 / 20	47
2017–18	2	Budaörsi SC	4 / 20	63
2018–19	2	Budaörsi SC	5 / 20	64
2019–20	2	Budaörsi SC	11 / 20	34
2020–21	2	Budaörsi SC	6 / 20	59
2021–22	2	Budaörsi SC	19 / 20	38
2022–23	3	Budaörsi SC	9 / 20	60
2023–24	3	Budaörsi SC	6 / 16	45
2024–25	3	Budaörsi SC	7 / 16	47
2025–26	3	Budaörsi SC	9 / 16	41
