= Létavértes SC =

Hungarian football club

Létavértes Sport Club '97
- Full name: Létavértes Sport Club '97
- Founded: 1952
- Ground: Létavértesi Sportcentrum
- League: Megyei Bajnokság I
- Website: https://letavertessport.hu/
Home colours

Létavértes Sport Club '97 is a professional football club based in Létavértes, Hajdú–Bihar County, Hungary, that competes in the Megyei Bajnokság I, the fourth tier of Hungarian football.

== History ==
During the 2010s, Létavértes functioned as the feeder team of Nemzeti Bajnokság I club Debreceni VSC. On 8 August 2013, Balázs Bényei and Vinícius Galvao were loaned to Létavértes from Debreceni VSC.

Létavértes won the Eastern group of the 2013–14 Nemzeti Bajnokság III season. However, the club did not gain promotion to the second division. The club did not apply for license from the Hungarian Football Federation (HFF). Later, Létavértes applied for a special license but the HFF rejected it. On 28 May 2014, the club's license for the second division was officially rejected.

== Name changes ==
- 1952: merger with Nagylétai ÁMGSK, Nagylétai Kinizsi and Nagylétai Petőfi
- 1952–?: Nagylétai SK
- ?–1970: Nagylétai Vörös Meteor
- 1970: the towns of Nagyléta and Vértes were united
- 1970–?: Létavértesi Vörös Meteor SE
- ?–1997: Létavértes SE
- 1997–present: Létavértes SC '97

== Honours ==
=== League ===
- Nemzeti Bajnokság III:
  - Winners (1): 2013–14
