= Orosháza FC =

Hungarian football club

Orosháza
- Full name: Orosháza Football Club
- Nickname: OFC
- Founded: 1950
- Dissolved: 2015
- Ground: Mátrai- Stadion, Orosháza
- Capacity: 3,000
- Chairman: Restál György
- League: NB II (Eastern group)
- 2011–12: 6th
Home colours	Away colours

Orosháza FC was a football club from Orosháza, Hungary. The club played in the Hungarian second division on several occasions, most recently being relegated in 2013.

== Honours ==
- Nemzeti Bajnokság III:
  - Winners (1): 2009–10

== Managers ==
- (Hungary) József Pásztor (2001)
