= Újbuda FC =

Hungarian football club

- Full name: Újbuda Football Club
- Founded: 1928
- Ground: Promontor utcai Stadion
- Capacity: 4,000
- Manager: Sándor Pári
- League: Nemzeti Bajnokság III
- 2016–17: 2014–15 Nemzeti Bajnokság III, 3rd
- Website: ujbudafc.hu
Home colours

Újbuda Football Club is a professional football club based in Újbuda, Budapest, Hungary, that competes in the Nemzeti Bajnokság III, the third tier of Hungarian football.

== History ==
The club merged with Budafoki MTE in 2013.

== Honours ==
=== Domestic ===
- Nemzeti Bajnokság III:
  - Third (1): 2010–11
