= Putnok FC =

Hungarian football club

Putnok VSE
- Full name: Putnok Városi Sport Egyesület
- Founded: 1991; 35 years ago
- Ground: Várady Béla Sportközpont; Putnok, Hungary
- Capacity: 1,300
- Chairman: Ágoston Negrutz
- Manager: Ákos Szala
- League: NB III; Northeast
- 2023–24: NB III; Northeast, 1st of 16
- Website: http://putnokfc.hu/
Home colours	Away colours

Putnok VSE is a Hungarian football club located in Putnok, Hungary. It currently plays in Nemzeti Bajnokság III – Northeast, the third tier of Hungarian football league system. The team's colors are blue and black.

== Honours ==
- Nemzeti Bajnokság III:
  - Winners (2): 2011–12, 2023–24

== Current squad ==
As of 20 December 2022

Note: Flags indicate national team as defined under FIFA eligibility rules; some limited exceptions apply. Players may hold more than one non-FIFA nationality.

No.	Pos.	Nation	Player
1	GK	HUN	András Nyirati
2	DF	HUN	Balázs Gellén
3	MF	HUN	Zoltán Csiba
5	DF	HUN	Félix Sághy
6	FW	UKR	Norbert Nádimov
7	FW	HUN	Erik Galacs
7	MF	HUN	Péter Holló
8	MF	HUN	Román Petrecsko
9	DF	ROU	Zsolt Nagy
10	DF	HUN	Ronáld Sramkó
11	FW	HUN	Bence Katona
13	DF	HUN	Péter Buda
14	MF	HUN	Norbert Csiki

No.	Pos.	Nation	Player
15	DF	UKR	Oleksiy Sich
16	DF	HUN	Mihály Csutora
17	DF	HUN	Cristofer Vajda
18	MF	UKR	Yevgen Dobrovolskyi
19	MF	HUN	Benedek Bodó
19	DF	HUN	Milán Nemes
21	GK	HUN	Krisztián Pápai
22	MF	HUN	Dávid Juhos
23	FW	HUN	György Komári
24	MF	HUN	János Soós
27	FW	ROU	Zsombor Veress
32	FW	HUN	Krisztián Fülöp

== Season results ==
As of 6 August 2017

Domestic												International		Manager	Ref.
Nemzeti Bajnokság											Magyar Kupa	International		Manager	Ref.
Div.	No.	Season	MP	W	D	L	GF–GA	Dif.	Pts.	Pos.	Magyar Kupa	Competition	Result	Manager	Ref.
NBIII	?.	2017–18	0	0	0	0	0–0	+0	0	TBD	TBD	Did not qualify		(Hungary)	
Σ		0	0	0	0	0–0	+0	0							
