= Diósdi TC =

Hungarian football club

- Full name: Diósdi Torna Club
- Founded: 1919
- Ground: SELECT Stadium
- Capacity: 600
- League: Nemzeti Bajnokság III
Home colours

Diósdi Torna Club is a professional football club based in Diósd, Pest County, Hungary, that competes in the Nemzeti Bajnokság III, the third tier of Hungarian football.

== Name changes ==
- 1919–?: Diósdi Torna Club
- ?–?: Diósdi Csapágy-gyári Vasas
- 1990–?: Diósdi Torna Club
- ?–present: Diósdi Torna Club-SELECT
