= Balatonfüredi FC =

Hungarian football club

- Full name: Balatonfüredi Futball Club
- Founded: 1924; 102 years ago
- Ground: Városi Sportpálya
- Capacity: 1000
- Manager: Tamás Szabados
- League: NBIII (North-West)
- 2023/24: 12th NBIII (West)
- Website: www.balatonfuredifc.hu
Home colours	Away colours

Balatonfüredi Futball Club is a professional football club based in Balatonfüred, Veszprém County, Hungary, that competes in the Hungarian third division.

== Name changes ==
- 1924–?: Balatonfüredi Sport Club
- ?-1945: Balatonfüredi Levente Egyesület
- 1945–1947: Balatonfüredi Sport Club
- 1947–1949: Balatonfüredi Hajózási Munkás Sport Egyesület
- 1949-1949: Balatonfüredi TIMSE
- 1949–1951: Balatonfüredi Vasas Hajógyári SK
- 1951–?: Balatonfüredi Vasas
- ?-?: MHD Balatonfüred SE
- 1990–2001: Balatonfüredi SC
- 2001–present: Balatonfüredi Futball Club

== Honours ==
- Nemzeti Bajnokság III:
  - Winners (1): 1994–95
- Szabadföld Kupa:
  - Runners-up (1): 1982

== Current squad ==
Note: Flags indicate national team as defined under FIFA eligibility rules; some limited exceptions apply. Players may hold more than one non-FIFA nationality.

No.	Pos.	Nation	Player
—	GK	HUN	Alex Iváncsics
—	GK	HUN	Levente Schrankó
—	GK	HUN	Ádám Erdélyi
—	DF	HUN	Kevin Molnár
—	DF	HUN	Barnabás Heinczinger
—	DF	HUN	Barna Burucz
—	DF	HUN	Gergő Tóth
—	MF	HUN	Sándor Csikós
—	MF	HUN	Dániel Sárossy
—	MF	HUN	Dániel Farkas
—	MF	HUN	Ákos Schmidt

No.	Pos.	Nation	Player
—	MF	HUN	István Imre
—	MF	HUN	Gergő Mayer
—	MF	HUN	Kevin Berzsenyi
—	FW	HUN	Kevin Rédling
—	FW	HUN	Bence Szabó
—	FW	HUN	László Lencse
—	FW	HUN	Dávid Irmes
—	FW	HUN	Benedek Kalmár
—	FW	HUN	Bálint Ferencz
—	FW	HUN	Roland Bartha

== Seasons ==
As of 17 October 2026.

Season	Tier	Club's name	Position	Pts
1925–26	3	Balatonfüredi SC	10 / 10	-
1932–33	3	Balatonfüredi SC	1 / 7	20
1933–34	3	Balatonfüredi SC	4 / 11	26
1934–35	3	Balatonfüredi SC	5 / 11	29
1935–36	3	Balatonfüredi SC	0 / 10	
1936–37	3	Balatonfüredi SC	11 / 11	3
1942–43	5	Balatonfüredi LE	1 / 13	41
1943–44	4	Balatonfüredi LE	11 / 12	10
1945–46	3	Balatonfüredi SC	0 / 8	
1946–47	5	Balatonfüredi SC	2 / 11	31
1947–48	4	Balatonfüredi Hajózási Munkás SE	3 / 12	32
1948–49	3	Balatonfüredi TIMSE (BHMSE)	15 / 16	20
1949–50	4	Balatonfüredi Vasas HSK	1 / 16	42
1950	3	Balatonfüredi Vasas HSK	6 / 16	17
1951	3	Balatonfüredi Vasas	13 / 14	12
1952	3	Balatonfüredi Vasas	12 / 14	22
1953	3	Balatonfüredi Vasas SK	15 / 16	15
1954	4	Balatonfüredi Vasas	1 / 10	31
1955	3	Balatonfüredi Vasas SK	10 / 16	22
1956	3	Balatonfüredi Vasas SK	13 / 14	12
1957	4	Balatonfüredi SC	0 / 8	14
1957–58	4	Balatonfüredi Vasas SC	13 / 18	24
1958–59	4	Balatonfüredi Vasas SC	13 / 16	23
1959–60	4	Balatonfüredi Vasas SC	7 / 17	35
1960–61	4	Balatonfüredi Vasas SC	9 / 18	31
1961–62	4	Balatonfüredi Vasas SC	11 / 16	26
1962–63	4	Balatonfüredi Vasas SC	14 / 16	23
1963	5	Balatonfüredi Vasas SC	13 / 18	12
1964	5	Balatonfüredi Vasas SC	6 / 18	30
1965	5	Balatonfüredi Vasas SC	5 / 18	32
1966	5	Balatonfüredi Vasas SC	12 / 15	20
1967	5	Balatonfüredi Vasas SC	11 / 16	24
1968	5	Balatonfüredi Vasas SC	7 / 14	19
1969	5	Balatonfüredi Vasas SC	6 / 14	23
1970	5	MHD Balatonfüredi Vasas SC	5 / 7	9
1970–71	5	Balatonfüredi Vasas SC	10 / 14	18
1971–72	5	Balatonfüredi Vasas SC	12 / 14	15
1972–73	6	Balatonfüred	7 / 14	15
1973–74	6	Balatonfüred	1 / 12	34
1974–75	5	Balatonfüred	2 / 14	41
1975–76	5	Balatonfüred	1 / 14	22
1976–77	4	MHD Balatonfüred SE	5 / 16	37
1977–78	4	MHD Balatonfüred SE	7 / 16	26
1978–79	3	MHD Balatonfüred SE	8 / 16	29
1979–80	3	MHD Balatonfüred SE	2 / 16	43
1980–81	3	MHD Balatonfüredi SE	4 / 18	46
1981–82	4	MHD Balatonfüredi SE	1 / 16	51
1982–83	4	MHD Balatonfüred SE	3 / 16	36
1983–84	4	MHD Balatonfüredi SE	3 / 16	41
1984–85	4	MHD Balatonfüredi SE	5 / 16	35
1985–86	4	MHD Balatonfüredi SE	3 / 16	45
1986–87	4	MHD Balatonfüredi SE	3 / 16	45
1987–88	4	Ganz Hajó Balatonfüredi SE	3 / 16	42
1988–89	4	MHD Balatonfüredi SE	7 / 14	25
1989–90	4	Ganz Hajó Balatonfüredi SE	4 / 16	55
1990–91	4	Ganz Hajó Balatonfüredi SE	1 / 16	52
1991–92	3	Balatonfüred	7 / 16	36
1992–93	3	Balatonfüredi SC	4 / 16	35
1993–94	3	Balatonfüredi SC	6 / 16	35
1994–95	3	Balatonfüredi SC	1 / 16	55
1995–96	2	Balatonfüredi SC	10 / 16	34
1996–97	2	Balatonfüredi SC	15 / 16	16
1997–98	4	Balatonfüred	11 / 16	37
1998–99	4	Balatonfüredi SC	8 / 16	44
1999–00	4	Balatonfüredi SC	4 / 16	51
2000	3	Balatonfüredi SC	3 / 8	25
2000–01	4	Balatonfüredi SC	1 / 11	46
2001–02	3	Balatonfüredi FC	11 / 13	24
2002–03	4	Balatonfüredi FC	13 / 16	26
2003–04	4	Balatonfüredi FC	14 / 16	32
2004–05	4	Balatonfüredi FC	14 / 14	14
2005–06	3	Balatonfüredi FC	12 / 16	35
2006–07	4	Balatonfüredi FC	8 / 16	40
2007–08	4	Balatonfüredi FC	4 / 16	54
2008–09	4	Balatonfüredi FC	4 / 16	59
2009–10	4	Balatonfüredi FC	1 / 16	72
2010–11	3	Balatonfüredi FC	6 / 16	50
2011–12	3	Balatonfüredi FC	4 / 15	50
2012–13	3	Balatonfüredi FC	4 / 14	50
2013–14	3	Balatonfüredi FC	7 / 16	47
2014–15	3	Balatonfüredi FC	11 / 16	30
2015–16	3	Balatonfüredi FC	17 / 17	12
2016–17	4	Balatonfüredi FC	2 / 16	81
2017–18	4	Balatonfüredi FC	1 / 16	77
2018–19	4	Balatonfüredi FC	2 / 16	77
2019–20	4	Balatonfüredi FC	1 / 16	54
2020–21	3	Balatonfüredi FC	11 / 20	52
2021–22	3	Balatonfüredi FC	13 / 20	47
2022–23	3	Balatonfüredi FC	10 / 20	56
2023–24	3	Balatonfüredi FC	12 / 16	33
2024–25	3	Balatonfüredi FC	14 / 16	27
2025–26	3	Balatonfüredi FC	15 / 16	18
