= Felsőtárkány SC =

Hungarian football club

- Full name: Felsőtárkány Sport Club
- Founded: 1951; 75 years ago
- Ground: Városi Sporttelep
Home colours	Away colours

Felsőtárkány Sport Club is a professional football club based in Felsőtárkány; Heves County, Hungary. The club competes in the Heves county league.

== Name changes ==
- 1951–2008: Felsőtárkányi TSz SK
- ?–2008: Felsőtárkány SE
- 2008–2015: Felsőtárkány SC
- 2012–2015: Fortress-Felsőtárkány SC
- 2015–2017: Felsőtárkány SC
- 2017–2018: Beton-Termék Felsőtárkány SC
- 2018–present: Felsőtárkány SC

== Honours ==
- Nemzeti Bajnokság III:
  - Winners (1): 2012–13
