= Rákosmenti KSK =

Hungarian football club

- Full name: Rákosmenti Községi Sport Kör
- Founded: 1949; 77 years ago
- Ground: Pesti út
- Capacity: 1,200
- League: NB III
- 2020–21: NB III, Centre, 12th
Home colours

Rákosmenti Községi Sport Kör is a professional football club based in Rákosmente, Budapest, Hungary, that competes in the Nemzeti Bajnokság III, the third tier of Hungarian football.

== Name changes ==
- 1947–48: Rákoskerti MaDISz
- 1948–50: Rákoskerti SzIT
- 1950–51: Rákoskerti DISz
- 1951: dissolved
- 1956: refounded
- 1956–?: Rákoskerti SK

== Honours ==
- Nemzeti Bajnokság III:
  - Fourth place (1): 2014–15

== Managers ==
- (Hungary) György Véber 2015–16
- (Hungary) György Véber 2020–present
