= 2016–17 Nemzeti Bajnokság III =

Nemzeti Bajnokság III
- Season: 2016–17
- Promoted: Győr; Budafok; Kazincbarcika
- Relegated: Sárvár (West); Hévíz (West); Komárom (West); Diósd (West); Tatabánya (West); Békéscsaba II (Central); Gyula (Central); Dabas-Gyón (Central); Méhkerék (Central); Komló (Central); Debreceni VSC II (East); Rákospalota (East); Hatvan (East); Hajdúböszörmény (East); Újpest FC II (East)
- All statistics correct as of 4 June 2017.

The 2016–17 Nemzeti Bajnokság III is Hungary's third-level football competition. Three teams were relegated including Szigetszentmiklós, Dunaújváros PASE, and Ajka from the 2015–16 Nemzeti Bajnokság II.

== Standings ==
=== Central ===
Pos	Team	Pld	W	D	L	GF	GA	GD	Pts	Promotion or relegation
1	Budafok (C, P)	34	28	3	3	75	24	+51	87	Promotion to Nemzeti Bajnokság II
2	Pécs	34	24	4	6	92	22	+70	76	
3	Szigetszentmiklós (Note: Szigetszentmiklós were not granted license for NB III next season) (R)	34	21	5	8	77	39	+38	68	Relegation to Megyei Bajnokság I
4	Dunaújváros	34	19	7	8	77	41	+36	64	
5	Hódmezővásárhely	34	16	10	8	47	37	+10	58	
6	Paks II	34	15	8	11	58	45	+13	53	
7	Szekszárd	34	13	13	8	38	32	+6	52	
8	Szentlőrinc	34	13	8	13	53	56	−3	47	
9	Pénzügyőr	34	13	7	14	43	48	−5	46	
10	Dabas	34	12	7	15	31	38	−7	43	
11	Dunaharaszti	34	12	6	16	39	47	−8	42	
12	Ferencváros II (Note: Ferencváros II ceased to exist after the season.) (R)	34	11	8	15	50	54	−4	41	Not competed in any division next season
13	Mórahalom	34	10	9	15	50	57	−7	39	Possible Relegation to Megyei Bajnokság I
14	Békéscsaba II (R)	34	10	6	18	44	66	−22	36	Relegation to Megyei Bajnokság I
15	Gyula (R)	34	10	6	18	29	56	−27	36	Relegation to Megyei Bajnokság I
16	Dabas-Gyón (R)	34	9	4	21	39	92	−53	31	Relegation to Megyei Bajnokság I
17	Méhkerék (R)	34	7	8	19	34	58	−24	29	Relegation to Megyei Bajnokság I
18	Komló (R)	34	2	3	29	24	88	−64	9	Relegation to Megyei Bajnokság I

Source: HFF
Rules for classification: 1) Points; 2) Matches won; 3) Goal difference; 4) Goals scored; 5) Head-to-head points; 6) Head-to-head goal difference; 7) Head-to-head away goals scored; 8) Fair play ranking; 9) Drawing of lots.
(C) Champions; (P) Promoted; (R) Relegated

=== East ===
Pos	Team	Pld	W	D	L	GF	GA	GD	Pts	Promotion or relegation
1	Kazincbarcika (C, P)	34	25	4	5	88	33	+55	79	Promotion to Nemzeti Bajnokság II
2	Monor	34	20	6	8	53	34	+19	66	
3	Jászberény	34	18	11	5	63	33	+30	65	
4	MTK II	34	15	11	8	64	37	+27	56	
5	Diósgyőr II	34	15	5	14	53	49	+4	50	
6	Putnok	34	14	7	13	46	49	−3	49	
7	Tállya	34	13	10	11	53	58	−5	49	
8	Rákosmente	34	14	6	14	69	54	+15	48	
9	STC Salgótarján	34	13	9	12	56	45	+11	48	
10	ESMTK	34	12	11	11	41	45	−4	47	
11	Nyírbátor	34	12	10	12	51	42	+9	46	
12	BKV Előre	34	14	3	17	57	58	−1	45	
13	Tiszaújváros	34	12	9	13	38	40	−2	45	Possible Relegation to Megyei Bajnokság I
14	Debrecen II (R)	34	11	9	14	49	50	−1	42	Relegation to Megyei Bajnokság I
15	Rákospalota (R)	34	11	7	16	42	55	−13	40	Relegation to Megyei Bajnokság I
16	Hatvan (R)	34	10	10	14	48	50	−2	40	Relegation to Megyei Bajnokság I
17	Hajdúböszörmény (R)	34	8	5	21	33	72	−39	29	Relegation to Megyei Bajnokság I
18	Újpest II (R)	34	1	3	30	24	124	−100	6	Relegation to Megyei Bajnokság I

Source: HFF
Rules for classification: 1) Points; 2) Matches won; 3) Goal difference; 4) Goals scored; 5) Head-to-head points; 6) Head-to-head goal difference; 7) Head-to-head away goals scored; 8) Fair play ranking; 9) Drawing of lots.
(C) Champions; (P) Promoted; (R) Relegated

=== West ===
Pos	Team	Pld	W	D	L	GF	GA	GD	Pts	Promotion or relegation
1	Győr (C, P)	32	27	0	5	84	22	+62	81	Promotion to Nemzeti Bajnokság II
2	Érd	32	23	3	6	70	36	+34	72	
3	Kaposvár	32	20	4	8	65	26	+39	64	
4	Ajka	32	18	5	9	58	39	+19	59	
5	Csorna	32	16	6	10	44	34	+10	54	
6	Puskás Akadémia II	32	16	3	13	54	38	+16	51	
7	Honvéd II	32	13	7	12	63	49	+14	46	
8	III. Kerület	32	14	3	15	47	43	+4	45	
9	Csepel	32	12	8	12	35	35	0	44	
10	Andráshida	32	13	4	15	41	46	−5	43	
11	Veszprém	32	11	7	14	32	49	−17	40	
12	Gyirmót II	32	10	10	12	34	43	−9	40	
13	Videoton II	32	10	5	17	41	60	−19	35	Possible Relegation to Megyei Bajnokság I
14	Sárvár (R)	32	8	9	15	24	42	−18	33	Relegation to Megyei Bajnokság I
15	Hévíz (R)	32	8	7	17	27	42	−15	31	Relegation to Megyei Bajnokság I
16	Komárom (R)	32	5	4	23	27	65	−38	19	Relegation to Megyei Bajnokság I
17	Diósd (R)	32	5	1	26	15	92	−77	16	Relegation to Megyei Bajnokság II
18	Tatabánya (Note: On 28 March 2017, Tatabánya were disqualified from the 2016–17 Nemzeti Bajnokság III season.) (D)	0	0	0	0	0	0	0	0	Not competed in any division next season

Source: HFF
Rules for classification: 1) Points; 2) Matches won; 3) Goal difference; 4) Goals scored; 5) Head-to-head points; 6) Head-to-head goal difference; 7) Head-to-head away goals scored; 8) Fair play ranking; 9) Drawing of lots.
(C) Champions; (D) Disqualified; (P) Promoted; (R) Relegated

== Play-offs ==
The following teams qualified for the 2017-18 Nemzeti Bajnokság III season from 2016-17 Megyei Bajnokság I:

=== Participants ===
County	Champion
Bács-Kiskun County	Tiszakécske FC
Békés County	Füzesgyarmati SK
Budapest	THSE Sashalom
Csongrád County	Makó FC
Fejér County	Iváncsa KSE
Hajdú-Bihar County	Debreceni EAC
Heves County	Gyöngyösi AK
Jász-Nagykun-Szolnok County	Tiszafüred VSE
Nógrád County	Balassagyarmat
Somogy County	Balatonlelle
Pest County	Vecsési FC
Vas County	Körmend
Veszprém County	Pápai PFC
Zala County	Nagykanizsa FC

The following teams qualified for the 2017–18 Nemzeti Bajnokság III on slots.

- THSE Sashalom (Budapest)
- Füzesgyarmati SK (Békés)
- Gyöngyösi AK (Heves),
- Tiszafüred VSE (Jász-Nagykun-Szolnok)
- Vecsési FC (Pest)
- Pápai PFC (Veszprém)

The following teams played play-offs to qualify.

=== 2nd leg ===
The second leg of the play-offs were played on 17 June 2017.

17 June 2017	Iváncsa (Fejér)	2–1	Balatonlelle (Somogy)	Iváncsa, Hungary
20:00 CET	2' 17' László Balogh	Report	88' Böjte	Referee: (Hungary)

17 June 2017	Debrecen (Hajdú)	1–1	Körmend (Vas)	Debrecen, Hungary
20:00 CET	51' Kerekes	Report	80' Simonka (o.g.)	Stadium: Oláh Gábor utcai Stadion; Referee: (Hungary)

17 June 2017	Nagykanizsa (Zala)	2–0	Makó (Csongrád)	Nagykanizsa, Hungary
20:00 CET	12' 39' Gábor Nagy	Report		Referee: (Hungary)

17 June 2017	Balassagyarmat (Nógrád)	0–1	Tiszakécske FC (Bács-Kiskun)	Balassagyarmat, Hungary
20:00 CET		Report	14' Székely	Referee: (Hungary)

== See also ==
- 2016–17 Nemzeti Bajnokság I
- 2016–17 Nemzeti Bajnokság II
- 2016–17 Magyar Kupa
- 2017 Magyar Kupa Final
