= 2017–18 Magyar Kupa =

Tournament details
- Country: Hungary
- Dates: 3 August 2017 – 23 May 2018
- Teams: 128 (Main round)

Final positions
- Champions: Újpest (10th title)
- Runners-up: Puskás Akadémia

Tournament statistics
- Top goal scorer: (Hungary) Patrik Tischler (10 goals)

The 2017–18 Magyar Kupa (English: Hungarian Cup) was the 78th season of Hungary's annual knock-out cup football competition. Újpest FC won the cup beating Puskás Akadémia FC in the final at the Groupama Aréna.

The title-holders, Ferencváros were eliminated in the second round by Kisvárda FC. The tournament was won by Újpest.

== Main Tournament ==
On 6 September 2017, it was announced that the Hungarian Football Federation will distribute 300 million HUF in the 2017–18 Magyar Kupa season.

On 11 September the draw took place at the headquarters of the Hungarian Football Federation. This was the first draw in the 2017–18 season where Nemzeti Bajnokság I and Nemzeti Bajnokság II clubs were included.

On 14 September 2017, the date of the match between Veszprém and Diósgyőr was modified.

== Round of 128 ==
19 September 2017	Dunaharaszti	1–2	Ferencváros	Dunaharaszti
15:00 CET	Mészáros 86'	Report	Botka 63'; Leandro 90+2'	Stadium: Dunaharaszti MTK Sporttelep; Attendance: 800; Referee: Róbert Nagy

19 September 2017	Veszprém	0–3	Diósgyőr	Veszprém
15:00 CET		Report	Szarka 6'; Forgács 10'; Bárdos 89'	Stadium: Egyetemi Városi Stadion; Referee: Gergely Kovács

20 September 2017	Kecskemét	1–4	Mezőkövesd	Kecskemét
15:00 CET	Balog 7'	Report	Baracskai 6'; Majtán 61', 82', 90+1'	Stadium: Műkertvárosi Sportcentrum; Attendance: 600; Referee: Mátyás Farkas

20 September 2017	Karancslapujtő	0–2	Balmazújváros	Karancslapujtő
15:00 CET		Report	Habovda 49'; Vólent 53'	Stadium: KSE Karancslapujtő Sportpálya; Referee: Miklós Bereczki

20 September 2017	Debreceni EAC	0–4	Budafok	Debrecen
15:00 CET		Report	Pölöskei 6'; Filkor 9'; Ihrig-Farkas 75', 87'	Stadium: Debreceni Egyetemi Sportpálya; Referee: Tamás Takács

20 September 2017	Pécs	0–1	Budapest Honvéd	Pécs
15:00 CET		Report	Holender 20'	Stadium: Stadion PMFC; Referee: Gábor Barna

20 September 2017	Gárdony	0–3	Zalaegerszeg	Gárdony
15:00 CET		Report	Babati 60'; Ďubek 71'; Kertész 88'	Stadium: Gárdony-Agárd Sportpálya; Referee: Tamás Berényi

20 September 2017	Tiszakécske	2–3	Nyíregyháza	Tiszakécske
15:00 CET	Juhász 22'; Puskás 57'	Report	Gréczi 3'; Gajdos 17'; Papp 89'	Stadium: Tiszakécske Városi Sportcentrum; Referee: Ádám Németh

20 September 2017	Nyíradony	0–2	Vasas	Nyíradony
15:00 CET		Report	Pavlov 63'; Kulcsár 90+2'	Stadium: Nyíradonyi Sportpálya; Referee: Gábor Kátai

20 September 2017	III. Kerület	1–3 (a.e.t.)	Soroksár	Budapest
15:00 CET	Pálfalvi 90+2'	Report	Pál 65', 117'; Gyepes 108'	Stadium: Hévízi úti Stadion; Attendance: 200; Referee: Tibor Farkas

20 September 2017	BKV Előre	0–3	Kisvárda	Budapest
15:00 CET		Report	Gosztonyi 37'; Ryashko 41'; Lukács 90'	Stadium: BKV Előre Stadion; Referee: Gábor Oláh

20 September 2017	Sárvár	0–3	Paks	Sárvár
15:00 CET		Report	Daru 32'; Simon 67'; Zachán 68'	Stadium: Sárvár FC Sporttelep; Referee: Tamás Móri

20 September 2017	Kozármisleny	0–1 (a.e.t.)	Gyirmót	Kozármisleny
15:00 CET		Report	Kiss 117'	Stadium: Kozármisleny Stadion; Attendance: 250; Referee: Zoltán J. Kovács

20 September 2017	Rákosszentmihály	1–3	Siófok	Budapest
15:00 CET	Ébenhardt 52' (pen.)	Report	Senić 2'; Fehér 78'; Elek 88'	Stadium: RAFC Sporttelep; Referee: Krisztián Debreczeni

20 September 2017	Nagyatád	0–2	Vác	Nagyatád
15:00 CET		Report	Havasi 55'; Króner 62'	Stadium: Nagyatádi Mudin Imre Sportcentrum; Referee: Balázs Nyakas

20 September 2017	Öttevény	0–6	Újpest	Öttevény
15:00 CET		Report	Tischler 23', 32', 41', 44'; Pávkovics 88'; Simon 90+1'	Stadium: Öttevényi TC Sporttelep; Referee: Gyöngyi Gaál

20 September 2017	Szarvaskend	0–6	Szombathelyi Haladás	Szarvaskend
15:00 CET		Report	Medgyes 3'; Mészáros 18', 30'; Tóth 21'; Rácz 43'; Grumić 90'	Stadium: Szarvaskend Sportegyesület; Referee: Annamária Tolnay

20 September 2017	Sényő	2–0 (a.e.t.)	Kazincbarcika	Sényő
15:00 CET	Kállai 97'; Lakatos 100'	Report		Stadium: Sényő Sportpálya; Referee: Norbert Nagy

20 September 2017	Cigánd	2–2 (a.e.t.) (7–6 p)	Szolnok	Cigánd
15:00 CET	Németh 34'; Tóth 89'	Report	Olasz 67'; Pintér 90+2'	Stadium: Cigánd Városi Stadion; Referee: Tamás Nazsa

20 September 2017	Komárom	0–2	Dorog	Komárom
15:00 CET		Report	Szedlár 66'; Simon 86'	Stadium: Komáromi Molaji Sporttelep; Referee: Bálint Juhász

20 September 2017	Tállya	0–9	MTK Budapest	Múcsony
15:00 CET		Report	B. Farkas 18', 63'; Hrepka 34', 55', 68'; Borbély 50'; Forgács 54'; Gera 77'; Katona 87'	Stadium: Sajóvölgye Sportcentrum; Referee: József Ducsai

20 September 2017	Mohács	0–4	Videoton	Mohács
15:00 CET		Report	Szabó 6', 81'; Tamás 21'; Fejes 43'	Stadium: Mohácsi Sporttelep; Referee: Attila Szommer

20 September 2017	Úrkút	2–6	Cegléd	Úrkút
15:00 CET	Keller 15'; Sáringer 80'	Report	Peres 6'; Nyilas 23', 53', 73'; Györe 78'; J. Farkas 79'	Stadium: Úrkút Sporttelep; Referee: Patrik Horváth

20 September 2017	Szekszárd	1–1 (a.e.t.) (4–2 p)	Szeged	Szekszárd
15:00 CET	Beke 28' (o.g.)	Report	Nicorec 15'	Stadium: Városi Szabadidőközpont; Referee: Bálint Dolengó

20 September 2017	Kondoros	0–2	Békéscsaba	Kondoros
15:00 CET		Report	Szélpál 28'; Eszlátyi 51'	Stadium: Kondorosi Sporttelep; Referee: János Dobai

20 September 2017	Csongrád	1–10	Debrecen	Csongrád
15:00 CET	Kiss-Kása 71'	Report	Takács 4'; Borda 9' (o.g.); Tisza 23', 54', 60', 69', 73'; Nagy 56'; Bárány 65', 90+1'	Stadium: Városi Sportpálya; Referee: Tünde Anikó Kiss

20 September 2017	Tatabánya	1–0	Sopron	Tatabánya
15:00 CET	Megyesi 68'	Report		Stadium: Stadion Gyula Grosics; Referee: Szabolcs Fenyvesi

20 September 2017	Kaposvár	1–3	Puskás Akadémia	Kaposvár
15:00 CET		[ Report]		Stadium: Stadion Kaposvár Rákóczi

20 September 2017	Mórahalom	1–4	Budaörs	Mórahalom
15:00 CET		[ Report]

20 September 2017	Nyírbátor	1–1 (3–5 p)	Győr	Nyírbátor
15:00 CET		[ Report]

20 September 2017	THSE Szabadkikötő	1–5	Csákvár	Budapest
15:00 CET		[ Report]

20 September 2017	Szarvas	4–1	Mosonmagyaróvár	Szarvas
15:00 CET		[ Report]

20 September 2017	Nagyhalász	1–3	Iváncsa	Nagyhalász
15:00 CET		[ Report]

20 September 2017	Csácsbozsok-Nemesapáti SE	2–3	Pilis	Szekszárd
15:00 CET		[ Report]

20 September 2017	Jászapáti	v	Nagyecsed	Jászapáti
15:00 CET		[ Report]

20 September 2017	Nagykanizsa	2–0	Törökszentmiklós	Nagykanizsa
15:00 CET		[ Report]

20 September 2017	Ménfőcsanak	1–3	Dabas	Ménfőcsanak
15:00 CET		[ Report]

20 September 2017	Maklár	1–4	Rákosmente	Maklár
15:00 CET		[ Report]

20 September 2017	Szabdaszállás	1–3	Dunaújváros	Szabadszállás
15:00 CET		[ Report]

20 September 2017	Füzesgyarmat	3–0	Makó	Füzesgyarmat
15:00 CET		[ Report]

20 September 2017	Gyöngyös	5–3 (a.e.t.)	Pénzügyőr	Gyöngyös
15:00 CET		[ Report]

20 September 2017	Szentlőrinc	3–0	Csepel	Szentlőrinc
15:00 CET		[ Report]

20 September 2017	Lajoskomárom	0–3	Andráshida	Lajoskomárom
15:00 CET		[ Report]

20 September 2017	Tata	2–7	Putnok	Tata, Hungary
15:00 CET		[ Report]

20 September 2017	Csetény	0–4	Ercsi	Csetény
15:00 CET		[ Report]

20 September 2017	Pécsváradi Spartacus SE	1–4	Tiszaújváros	Pécsvárad
15:00 CET		[ Report]

20 September 2017	Jánoshalom	0–2	Gödöllő	Jánoshalma
15:00 CET		[ Report]

20 September 2017	Ajka	2–2 (4–5 p)	Érd	Ajka
15:00 CET		[ Report]

20 September 2017	Bátaszék	3–2	Tolna VFC	Bátaszék
15:00 CET		[ Report]

20 September 2017	Budakalászi MSE	1–3	STC Salgótarján	Budakalász
15:00 CET		[ Report]

20 September 2017	Edelényi FC	1–3	Szegedi EOL	Edelény
15:00 CET		[ Report]

20 September 2017	Salgótarjáni BTC	7–2	Petőfi SE	Salgótarján
15:00 CET		[ Report]

20 September 2017	Balatonlelle	0–2	Vecsési FC	Balatonlelle
15:00 CET		[ Report]

20 September 2017	Bácsa FC SE	1–0	Pápai PFC	Bácsa
15:00 CET		[ Report]

20 September 2017	Tiszafüred VSE	1–4	Csornai SE	Tiszafüred
15:00 CET		[ Report]

20 September 2017	Ibrány	3–1	Jászberényi FC	Ibrány
15:00 CET		[ Report]

20 September 2017	Ásotthalmi TE	2–2 (4–3 p)	Hódmezővásárhelyi FC	Ásotthalom
15:00 CET		[ Report]

20 September 2017	Tiszakécske	4–1	Algyői SK	Tiszakécske
15:00 CET		[ Report]

20 September 2017	Eger SE	3–1	Testvériség SE	Eger
15:00 CET		[ Report]

20 September 2017	Olajmunkás SE	3–1	Bódva-völgyi Tömegsport	Gellénháza
15:00 CET		[ Report]

20 September 2017	Erzsébeti SMTK	0–1	Monori SE	Budapest
15:00 CET		[ Report]

20 September 2017	Balatonfüredi FC	3–2 (a.e.t.)	Pestszentimrei SK	Balatonfüred
15:00 CET		[ Report]

20 September 2017	Sárrétudvari	1–8	Balassagyarmati VSE	Sárrétudvari
15:00 CET	Sűcs 45'	Report	Tóth 3' (o.g.); Magos 18', 88'; Tóth 21', 33'; Nagy 37', 51'; Molnár 59'	Stadium: Sárrétudvari Sportpálya; Referee: János Takács

20 September 2017	Felsőtárkány	1–3	Mád FC	Felsőtárkány
15:00 CET		[ Report]

== Round of 64 ==
On 22 September 2017 the draw of the second proper took place. The 2016–17 Magyar Kupa winner Ferencváros will play against the leader of the 2017–18 Nemzeti Bajnokság II, Kisvárda FC.

24 October 2017	Kisvárda (NB II)	1–0	Ferencváros (NB I)	Kisvárda, Hungary
15:00 CET	Horvath 37' (pen.)			Stadium: Várkert Sportpálya

24 October 2017	Tiszaújváros	1–1 (p.)	Szombathelyi Haladás (NB I)	Tiszaújváros, Hungary
15:00 CET

24 October 2017	Balassagyarmat	0–1	Diósgyőr (NB I)	Balassagyarmat, Hungary
15:00 CET

24 October 2017	Monor	2–3	Debrecen (NB I)	Monor, Hungary
15:00 CET

24 October 2017	Dabas	0–4	Videoton (NB I)	Dabas, Hungary
15:00 CET

24 October 2017	Cigánd (county I)	1–1 (a.e.t.) (3–1 p)	Füzesgyarmat (NB III)	Cigánd, Hungary
15:00 CET

25 October 2017	Gödöllő (county I)	0–3	Újpest (NB I)	Gödöllő, Hungary
15:00 CET			Tischler 38' (pen.), 49', 65'

25 October 2017	Bátaszék	0–1	Balmazújváros	Bátaszék, Hungary
15:00 CET			Virag 62'

25 October 2017	Eger	0–6	Puskás Akadémia	Eger, Hungary
15:00 CET			Prosser 23', 50', 65'; Knežević 44'; Titko 57' (o.g.); Madarász 63'

25 October 2017	Balatonfüred	0–7	Paks	Balatonfüred, Hungary
15:00 CET		[ Report]

25 October 2017	Szekszárd	0–3	Csákvár	Szekszárd, Hungary
15:00 CET		[ Report]

25 October 2017	Cegléd	0–4	Soroksár	Cegléd, Hungary
15:00 CET		[ Report]

25 October 2017	Törtel	1–3	Sényő	Törtel, Hungary
15:00 CET		[ Report]

25 October 2017	Andráshida	1–2	Siófok	Andráshida, Hungary
15:00 CET		[ Report]

25 October 2017	Nagykanizsa	4–2 (a.e.t.)	Olajmunkás	Nagykanizsa, Hungary
15:00 CET		[ Report]

25 October 2017	Pilis	1–3	Zalaegerszeg	Pilis, Hungary
15:00 CET		[ Report]

25 October 2017	Tatabánya	2–3	Nagyecsed	Tatabánya, Hungary
15:00 CET		[ Report]

25 October 2017	Mád	1–4	Békéscsaba	Mád, Hungary
15:00 CET		[ Report]

25 October 2017	Csorna	2–4	Nyíregyháza	Csorna, Hungary
15:00 CET		[ Report]

25 October 2017	Ercsi	0–6	Érd	Ercsi, Hungary
15:00 CET		[ Report]

25 October 2017	Szegedi EOL SC	2–3	Győr	Szeged, Hungary
15:00 CET		[ Report]

25 October 2017	Iváncsa	1–4	MTK Budapest	Iváncsa, Hungary
15:00 CET		[ Report]

25 October 2017	Ibrány	0–3	Budafok	Ibrány, Hungary
15:00 CET		[ Report]

25 October 2017	Putnok	1–3	Dorog	Putnok, Hungary
15:00 CET		[ Report]

25 October 2017	Somos	0–1	Vác	Salgótarján, Hungary
15:00 CET		[ Report]

25 October 2017	Bácsa	1–1 (p)	Vecsés	Bácsa, Hungary
15:00 CET		[ Report]

25 October 2017	Ásotthalom	0–5	Rákosmente	Ásotthalom, Hungary
15:00 CET		[ Report]

25 October 2017	Gyöngyös	2–1	Szentlőrinc	Gyöngyös, Hungary
15:00 CET		[ Report]

25 October 2017	Salgótarján	2–4 (a.e.t.)	Szarvas	Salgótarján, Hungary
15:00 CET		[ Report]

25 October 2017	Gyirmót	2–1 (a.e.t.)	Mezőkövesd	Győr, Hungary
15:00 CET		[ Report]		Stadium: Ménfői úti Stadion

25 October 2017	Budaörs	1–1 (p)	Budapest Honvéd	Budaörs, Hungary
15:00 CET		[ Report]

25 October 2017	Dunaújváros	2–1	Vasas	Dunaújváros, Hungary
15:00 CET		[ Report]		Stadium: Eszperantó úti Stadion

== Round of 32 ==
On 25 October 2017, the draw of the third round proper took place at the headquarters of the Hungarian Football Federation.

28 November 2017	Kisvárda (NB II)	0–1	Puskás Akadémia (NB I)	Kisvárda, Hungary
15:00 CET		[ Report]	Diallo 18'	Stadium: Várkert Sportpálya

29 November 2017	Dunaújváros (NB III)	1–3	Balmazújváros (NB I)	Dunaújváros, Hungary
15:00 CET		[ Report]

29 November 2017	Soroksár (NB II)	1–3	Diósgyőr (NB I)	Budapest, Hungary
15:00 CET		[ Report]

29 November 2017	Gyöngyös (NB III)	0–4	Budapest Honvéd (NB I)	Gyöngyös, Hungary
15:00 CET		[ Report]

29 November 2017	Csákvár (NB II)	0–1	Paks (NB I)	Csákvár, Hungary
15:00 CET		[ Report]

29 November 2017	Budafok (NB II)	0–3	Debrecen (NB I)	Budapest, Hungary
15:00 CET		[ Report]

29 November 2017	Vecsés (NB III)	0–5	Újpest (NB I)	Vecsés, Hungary
15:00 CET		[ Report]

29 November 2017	Vác (NB II)	3–1	Videoton (NB I)	Vác, Hungary
15:00 CET		[ Report]		Stadium: Ligeti Stadion

29 November 2017	Nagykanizsa (county I)	3–2	Érd (NB III)	Csákvár, Hungary
15:00 CET		[ Report]

29 November 2017	Győr (NB II)	3–1	Nyíregyháza (NB II)	Győr, Hungary
15:00 CET		[ Report]		Stadium: ETO Park

29 November 2017	MTK Budapest (NB II)	2–1	Gyirmót (NB II)	Budapest, Hungary
15:00 CET		[ Report]		Stadium: Hidegkuti Nándor Stadion

29 November 2017	Nagyecsed (county I)	0–4	Siófok (NB II)	Nagyecsed, Hungary
15:00 CET		[ Report]

29 November 2017	Sényő (county I)	2–0	Rákosmente (NB III)	Sényő, Hungary
15:00 CET		[ Report]

29 November 2017	Tiszaújváros (NB III)	0–2	Békéscsaba (NB II)	Tiszaújváros, Hungary
15:00 CET		[ Report]

29 November 2017	Szarvas (county I)	0–3	Zalaegerszeg (NB II)	Szarvas, Hungary
15:00 CET		[ Report]

29 November 2017	Cigánd (NB III)	0–2	Dorog (NB II)	Cigánd, Hungary
15:00 CET		[ Report]

== Round of 16 ==
On 29 November 2017, the draw of the third round proper took place at the headquarters of the Hungarian Football Federation.

=== First leg ===
20 February 2018	Nagykanizsa (county I)	1–3	Békéscsaba (NB II)	Nagykanizsa, Hungary
15:00 CET		[ Report]

20 February 2018	Zalaegerszeg (NB II)	1–0	Puskás Akadémia (NB I)	Zalaegerszeg, Hungary
15:00 CET		[ Report]		Stadium: ZTE Arena

20 February 2018	Debrecen (NB I)	1–2	Dorog (NB II)	Debrecen, Hungary
15:00 CET		[ Report]		Stadium: Nagyerdei Stadion

20 February 2018	Diósgyőr (NB I)	2–0	Vác (NB II)	Debrecen, Hungary
15:00 CET		[ Report]		Stadium: Nagyerdei Stadion

21 February 2018	Győr (NB II)	2–3	Balmazújváros (NB I)	Győr, Hungary
15:00 CET		[ Report]		Stadium: ETO Park

21 February 2018	MTK Budapest (NB II)	4–0	Sényő (county I)	Budapest, Hungary
15:00 CET		[ Report]		Stadium: Hidegkuti Nándor Stadion

21 February 2018	Siófok (NB II)	2–2	Budapest Honvéd (NB I)	Siófok, Hungary
15:00 CET		[ Report]		Stadium: Révész Géza utcai Stadion

27 February 2018	Újpest (NB I)	2–0	Paks (NB I)	Paks, Hungary
15:00 CET		[ Report]		Stadium: Fehérvári úti Stadion

=== Second leg ===
28 February 2018	Békéscsaba (NB II)	1–0 (4–1 agg.)	Nagykanizsa (county I)	Békéscsaba, Hungary
17:00 CET		Report		Stadium: Kórház utcai Stadion; Attendance: 120

28 February 2018	Puskás Akadémia (NB I)	2–0 (2–1 agg.)	Zalaegerszeg (NB II)	Felcsút, Hungary
19:00 CET		Report		Stadium: Pancho Aréna

28 February 2018	Dorog (NB II)	2–3 (4–4 (a) agg.)	Debrecen (NB I)	Dorog, Hungary
15:00 CET		Report		Stadium: Buzánszky Jenő Stadion

28 February 2018	Vác (NB II)	0–1 (0–3 agg.)	Diósgyőr (NB I)	Budapest, Hungary
15:00 CET		Report		Stadium: Hévízi út Attendance: 280

28 February 2018	Balmazújváros (NB I)	0–0 (3–2 agg.)	Győr (NB II)	Balmazújváros, Hungary
15:00 CET		Report		Stadium: Balmazújvárosi Városi Sportpálya

7 March 2018	Sényő (county I)	2–0 (2–4 agg.)	MTK Budapest (NB II)	Sényő, Hungary
13:00 CET		Report

7 March 2018	Budapest Honvéd (NB I)	2–1 (4–3 agg.)	Siófok (NB II)	Budapest, Hungary
18:00 CET		Report		Stadium: Bozsik Stadion

6 March 2018	Paks (NB I)	0–2 (0–4 agg.)	Újpest (NB I)	Paks, Hungary
15:00 CET		Report		Stadium: Fehérvári úti Stadion

== Quarter-finals ==
On 28 February 2018, the draw of the fifth round proper took place.

=== First leg ===
13 March 2018	Puskás Akadémia (NB I)	0–1	Diósgyőr (NB I)	Felcsút, Hungary
17:00 CET		Report	34' Ioannidis	Stadium: Pancho Aréna

13 March 2018	Újpest (NB I)	2–1	MTK Budapest (NB II)	Budapest, Hungary
18:00 CET	Bojović 37'; Nagy 66'	Report	39' Vass	Stadium: Szusza Ferenc Stadion

14 March 2018	Budapest Honvéd (NB I)	0–0	Debrecen (NB I)	Budapest, Hungary
16:00 CET		Report		Stadium: Bozsik Stadion

14 March 2018	Balmazújváros (NB I)	5–0	Békéscsaba (NB II)	Balmazújváros, Hungary
17:00 CET	Vayda 23' 51' 60'; Zsiga 35'; Habovda 44'	Report		Stadium: Balmazújvárosi Városi Sportpálya

=== Second leg ===
3 April 2018	Debrecen (NB I)	3–1 (3–1 agg.)	Budapest Honvéd (NB I)	Debrecen, Hungary
15:00 CET	Könyves 4' 37' 63'	Report	68' Eppel	Stadium: Nagyerdei Stadion

4 April 2018	MTK Budapest (NB II)	3–2 (4–4 (a) agg.)	Újpest (NB I)	Budapest, Hungary
15:00 CET	Kanta 17' 61'; Deutsch 63'	Report	53' 83' Novothny	Stadium: Hidegkuti Nándor Stadion

4 April 2018	Diósgyőr (NB I)	0–3 (1–3 agg.)	Puskás Akadémia (NB I)	Mezőkövesd, Hungary
15:00 CET		Report	40' Perošević; 49' Knežević; 85' Henty	Stadium: Mezőkövesdi Városi Stadion

4 April 2018	Békéscsaba (NB II)	1–2 (1–7 agg.)	Balmazújváros (NB I)	Békéscsaba, Hungary
15:00 CET	Király 75'	Report	25' Shindagoridze; 80' Harsányi	Stadium: Kórház utcai Stadion

== Semi-finals ==
On 3 April 2018, Debrecen reached the last four. On 4 April 2018, Újpest, Balmazújváros and Puskás Akadémia qualified for the semi-finals. On 5 April 2018, it was published by Nemzeti Sport that MTK Budapest is considering to caveat the second-leg of the quarter-finals against Újpest because according to the regulations only 5 non-EU player can play in the Magyar Kupa matches. However, there were 6 non-EU players in the Újpest FC team.

On 6 April 2018, the draw took place at the headquarters of the Hungarian Football Federation.

=== First leg ===
17 April 2018	Újpest (NB I)	2–1	Balmazújváros (NB I)	Budapest, Hungary
19:00 CET	Nagy 19', 33'	Report	85' Arabuli	Stadium: Szusza Ferenc Stadion

18 April 2018	Puskás Akadémia (NB I)	4–0	Debrecen (NB I)	Felcsút, Hungary
20:15 CET	Henty 2', 31'; Perošević 43'; Knežević 80'	Report		Stadium: Pancho Aréna; Attendance: 818

=== Second leg ===
8 May 2018	Debrecen (NB I)	2–0 (2–4 agg.)	Puskás Akadémia (NB I)	Debrecen, Hungary
20:00 CET	Tisza 38'; Takács 50'	Report		Stadium: Nagyerdei Stadion

9 May 2018	Balmazújváros (NB I)	0–0 (1–2 agg.)	Újpest (NB I)	Balmazújváros, Hungary
20:00 CET		[ Report]		Stadium: Balmazújvárosi Városi Sportpálya

== Final ==
23 May 2018	Puskás Akadémia FC (NB I)	2–2 (a.e.t.) (4–5 p)	Újpest FC (NB I)	Budapest
20:00 CEST	Knežević 38'; Perošević 66'	Report	Zsótér 55'; Bojović 63'	Stadium: Groupama Arena; Attendance: 11,270; Referee: Sándor Andó-Szabó
	Penalties
	Perošević (penalty scored); Bačelić-Grgić (penalty scored); Diallo (penalty scored); Henty (penalty missed); Balogh (penalty scored); J. Hegedűs (penalty missed)		(penalty scored) Onovo; (penalty scored) Litauszki; (penalty scored) Diallo; (penalty missed) Balázs; (penalty scored) Zsótér; (penalty scored) Bojović

== Statistics ==
=== Top goalscorers ===
Rank	Player	Club	Goals
1	(Hungary) Patrik Tischler	Újpest	10
2	(Hungary) Tibor Tisza	Debrecen	8
3	(Hungary) Dániel Nagy	Újpest	5

Updated to games played on 11 May 2018

== See also ==
- 2017–18 Nemzeti Bajnokság I
- 2017–18 Nemzeti Bajnokság II
- 2017–18 Nemzeti Bajnokság III
