= 2008–09 Nemzeti Bajnokság III =

Nemzeti Bajnokság III
- Season: 2008–09
- Champions: Budapest Honvéd FC II (Alföld); Hévíz FC (Bakony); Szentlőrinc SE (Dráva); Szigetszentmiklósi TK (Duna); Mezőkövesd-Zsóry SE (Mátra); Hajdúböszörményi TE (Tisza)
- Promoted: Budapest Honvéd FC II (Alföld); Hévíz FC (Bakony); Szigetszentmiklósi TK (Duna); Videoton FC/Puskás Akadémia FC (Duna); Mezőkövesd-Zsóry SE (Mátra); Hajdúböszörményi TE (Tisza)

The 2008–09 Nemzeti Bajnokság III season was the 28th edition of the Nemzeti Bajnokság III.

== League table ==
=== Alföld group ===
Pos	Team	Pld	W	D	L	GF	GA	GD	Pts	Promotion or relegation
1	Budapest Honvéd FC II	30	19	6	5	73	29	+44	63	Promotion to Nemzeti Bajnokság II
2	Szolnoki Spartacus SK	30	19	5	6	60	30	+30	62	
3	Kecskeméti TE II	30	19	2	9	76	36	+40	59	
4	Algyő SK	30	18	5	7	73	34	+39	59	
5	Budafoki LC	30	17	3	10	46	30	+16	54	
6	Hódmezővásárhely FC	30	15	5	10	51	39	+12	50	
7	Orosháza FC	30	14	6	10	59	47	+12	48	
8	Érdi VSE	30	14	4	12	39	33	+6	46	
9	Gyulai Termál FC	30	12	3	15	55	54	+1	39	
10	Dabas FC	30	11	6	13	53	60	−7	39	
11	Tisza Volán SC	30	11	4	15	44	50	−6	37	
12	Monor SE	30	10	4	16	40	64	−24	34	
13	Újbuda TC	30	9	4	17	51	78	−27	31	
14	Adrenalin - Izsáki Sárfehér SE	30	9	2	19	35	62	−27	29	Relegation to Megyei Bajnokság I
15	Kiskunfélegyházi Honvéd TK	30	6	4	20	27	68	−41	22	Relegation to Megyei Bajnokság I
16	Jászapáti VSE	30	3	5	22	17	85	−68	14	Relegation to Megyei Bajnokság I

=== Bakony group ===
Pos	Team	Pld	W	D	L	GF	GA	GD	Pts	Promotion or relegation
1	Hévíz FC	30	24	6	0	106	21	+85	78	Promotion to Nemzeti Bajnokság II
2	Veszprém FC	30	22	6	2	84	16	+68	72	
3	Lipót SK	30	19	4	7	74	32	+42	61	
4	Szombathelyi Haladás II	30	18	3	9	54	36	+18	57	
5	Sárvári FC	30	17	5	8	58	30	+28	56	
6	KSE Csesztreg	30	13	6	11	57	60	−3	45	
7	Badacsonytomaji SE	30	12	4	14	48	59	−11	40	
8	Répcelaki SE	30	11	7	12	41	57	−16	40	
9	Soproni VSE	30	12	3	15	64	69	−5	39	
10	MTE Mosonmagyaróvár	30	12	2	16	47	55	−8	38	
11	Celldömölki VSE	30	11	5	14	41	51	−10	38	
12	Büki TK	30	9	5	16	52	55	−3	32	
13	Csornai SE	30	9	5	16	32	48	−16	32	
14	SK Ajka-Padragkút SE	30	7	2	21	38	81	−43	23	Relegation to Megyei Bajnokság I
15	TIAC-Honvéd VSE	30	5	6	19	33	90	−57	21	Relegation to Megyei Bajnokság I
16	Vépi KSE	30	2	5	23	20	89	−69	11	Relegation to Megyei Bajnokság I

=== Dráva group ===
Pos	Team	Pld	W	D	L	GF	GA	GD	Pts	Relegation
1	Szentlőrinci SE	30	24	2	4	82	23	+59	74	
2	Paksi FC II	30	19	4	7	99	45	+54	61	
3	Nagykanizsai TE 1866	30	18	4	8	67	48	+19	58	
4	Szekszárdi UFC	30	15	11	4	57	31	+26	56	
5	Kaposvári Rákóczi FC II	30	15	5	10	69	48	+21	50	
6	Bogád SE	30	15	4	11	46	44	+2	49	
7	Dombóvári FC-Rutin	30	13	8	9	39	31	+8	47	
8	Pécsi VSK - Fürge Nyuszi	30	12	9	9	55	53	+2	45	Relegation to Megyei Bajnokság I
9	Komlói Bányász SK	30	11	9	10	45	41	+4	42	
10	Nagyatádi FC	30	10	8	12	37	46	−9	38	
11	Mohácsi TE	30	11	2	17	52	63	−11	35	
12	Beremendi Építők SK	30	9	4	17	41	65	−24	31	Relegation to Megyei Bajnokság I
13	Bonyhád VLC	30	8	4	18	38	72	−34	28	Relegation to Megyei Bajnokság I
14	Pécsváradi Spartacus SK	30	5	7	18	40	75	−35	22	Relegation to Megyei Bajnokság I
15	Marcali VFC	30	6	3	21	24	60	−36	21	Relegation to Megyei Bajnokság I
16	Nagybajomi AC	30	5	4	21	36	82	−46	19	Relegation to Megyei Bajnokság I

=== Duna group ===
Pos	Team	Pld	W	D	L	GF	GA	GD	Pts	Promotion or relegation
1	Szigetszentmiklósi TK	30	23	4	3	77	22	+55	73	Promotion to Nemzeti Bajnokság II
2	Velence SE	30	21	5	4	80	38	+42	68	Relegation to Megyei Bajnokság I
3	Soroksár SC	30	19	7	4	59	30	+29	64	
4	Dunaharaszti MTK	30	15	10	5	64	37	+27	55	
5	BFC Siófok II	30	16	5	9	54	26	+28	53	
6	Móri SE	30	11	9	10	47	36	+11	42	
7	Lindab-Törökbálinti TC	30	10	9	11	55	54	+1	39	
8	Pénzügyőr SE	30	9	11	10	37	46	−9	38	
9	Csepel FC	30	10	7	13	36	43	−7	37	
10	Videoton FC-Puskás Akadémia	30	10	5	15	40	49	−9	35	Promotion to Nemzeti Bajnokság II
11	Dorogi FC	30	9	7	14	37	52	−15	34	
12	Sárisáp-Sikér SE	30	7	10	13	35	50	−15	31	
13	III. Kerületi TUE	30	7	9	14	39	63	−24	30	Relegation to Megyei Bajnokság I
14	Környe SE	30	7	5	18	36	65	−29	23 (Note: 3 points deducted?)	Relegation to Megyei Bajnokság I
15	Balatonlelle SE	30	6	6	18	29	55	−26	24	Relegation to Megyei Bajnokság I
16	Csillaghegyi MTE	30	3	5	22	29	88	−59	14	Relegation to Megyei Bajnokság I

=== Mátra group ===
Pos	Team	Pld	W	D	L	GF	GA	GD	Pts	Promotion or relegation
1	Mezőkövesd-Zsóry SE	30	22	4	4	78	21	+57	70	Promotion to Nemzeti Bajnokság II
2	Újpest FC II	30	22	4	4	70	19	+51	70	
3	Tura VSK	30	20	1	9	57	31	+26	61	
4	Gyöngyösi AK-YTONG	30	15	4	11	43	34	+9	49	
5	Salgótarján-Baglyasalja FC	30	15	4	11	41	39	+2	46 (Note: 3 points deducted)	Relegation to Megyei Bajnokság I
6	Balmazújvárosi FC	30	13	7	10	43	44	−1	46	
7	Ózdi FC	30	12	5	13	41	45	−4	41	
8	Putnok VSE	30	10	10	10	51	48	+3	40	
9	Vasas SC II	30	10	7	13	40	39	+1	37	
10	Maglódi TC	30	10	6	14	32	52	−20	36	
11	Egri FC	30	9	9	12	30	35	−5	36	
12	Rákosszentmihályi AFC	30	9	7	14	29	43	−14	34	
13	Balassagyarmati VSE-Nógrád Volán	30	9	7	14	35	52	−17	34	
14	FC Tiszaújváros	30	9	5	16	41	66	−25	32	Relegation to Megyei Bajnokság I
15	Tiszafüredi VSE	30	8	2	20	44	74	−30	26	Relegation to Megyei Bajnokság I
16	Veresegyház VSK	30	4	4	22	33	66	−33	16	Relegation to Megyei Bajnokság I

=== Tisza group ===
Pos	Team	Pld	W	D	L	GF	GA	GD	Pts	Promotion or relegation
1	Hajdúböszörményi TE	30	18	9	3	54	18	+36	63	Promotion to Nemzeti Bajnokság II
2	Nagyecsed RSE	30	17	6	7	56	35	+21	57	
3	Nyírmadai ISE	30	16	4	10	53	33	+20	52	
4	Kemecse SE	30	12	12	6	47	29	+18	48	
5	Ibrány VSE	30	14	5	11	55	47	+8	47	
6	Diósgyőri VTK II	30	14	4	12	43	44	−1	46	
7	Nyíregyháza Spartacus FC II	30	12	7	11	39	35	+4	43	
8	Tiszakanyár SE	30	12	6	12	48	48	0	42	
9	Létavértes SC '97	30	10	7	13	32	36	−4	37	
10	Berettyóújfalu SE	30	10	7	13	36	47	−11	37	
11	Tiszalöki VSE	30	10	6	14	46	46	0	36	
12	Tuzsér SE	30	10	4	16	44	51	−7	34	
13	Balkányi SE	30	10	3	17	35	65	−30	33	
14	Várda SE 1	30	14	8	8	49	36	+13	28 (Note: 22 points deducted due to illegal play)	Relegation to Megyei Bajnokság I
15	Hajdúszoboszlói SE	30	8	4	18	30	57	−27	28	Relegation to Megyei Bajnokság I
16	Volán-Sényő SC	30	6	2	22	25	65	−40	20	Relegation to Megyei Bajnokság I

== See also ==
- 2008–09 Magyar Kupa
- 2008–09 Nemzeti Bajnokság I
- 2008–09 Nemzeti Bajnokság II
