= 2025–26 Nemzeti Bajnokság III =

Hungarian football season

Nemzeti Bajnokság III
- Season: 2025–26
- Champions: Gyirmót (Northwest); Nagykanizsa (Southwest); Kisvárda II (Northeast); Monor (Southeast)
- Promoted: Gyirmót and Nagykanizsa
- Relegated: Northwest: Pápa, Balatonfüred, Zsámbék, Northeast: Ózd, Sényő, Hatvan, Southwest: PTE-PEAC, Balatonlelle, Pénzügyőr, Dombóvár, Southeast: Szeged GA II, Békéscsaba II, Martfű, Tiszaföldvár
- Top goalscorer: Zoltán Horváth (Cigánd) and Zalán Gera (Mosonmagyaróvár) (24–24 each)

The 2025–26 Nemzeti Bajnokság III is Hungary's third-level football competition.

== Overview ==
16 teams will compete in 4 groups. Out of the four group winners, two team will be promoted via promotion play-offs. The last 3 teams in each group and the two worst 13th placed team will get relegated.

== Team changes ==
The following teams have changed division since the 2024–25 season.

=== To Nemzeti Bajnokság III ===
Promoted from Megyei Bajnokság I

- Pápa
- Tarpa
- Ózd
- Gödöllő
- Szeged-Csanád II
- Balatonlelle
- Dunaújváros FC
- Zsámbék
- Békéscsaba II

Relegated from the Nemzeti Bajnokság II

- Gyirmót
- Tatabánya

=== From Nemzeti Bajnokság III ===
Promoted to the Nemzeti Bajnokság II

- Tiszakécske
- Karcag

Relegated to Megyei Bajnokság I

- Gyirmót II
- Kelen
- Salgótarján
- Mátészalkai MTK
- Főnix
- Gárdony
- Dunaföldvár
- Szolnok
- Kecskemét II

=== Stadium and locations ===
Location of teams and stadiums in 2024–25 Nemzeti Bajnokság III.
Yellow: Northwest, Red: Northeast, Blue: Southwest, Green: Southeast
Location of Budapest metropolitan area teams.
Green: Northwest, Red: Northeast, Blue: Southwest, Yellow: Southeast

Following is the list of clubs competing in the league this season, with their location, stadium and stadium capacity.

Note: Table lists in alphabetical order.

==== Northwest ====
Team	Location	Stadium	Cap.
Balatonfüred	Balatonfüred	Balatonfüredi Sporttelep	N/A
Bicske	Bicske	Bicskei Sportpálya	N/A
Budaörs	Budaörs	Budaörsi Stadion	1,300
Dorog	Dorog	Buzánszky Jenő Stadion	5,000
Gyirmót	Győr (Gyirmót)	Alcufer Stadion	4,728
Győr II	Győr (Gyárváros)	ETO Park, Camping Pálya	1,000
Komárom	Komárom	Czibor Zoltán Városi Sporttelep	4,132
Mosonmagyaróvár	Mosonmagyaróvár	Wittmann Antal park	4,000
Pápa	Pápa	Perutz Stadion	5,500
Puskás Akadémia II	Felcsút	PFLA füves IV. pálya	N/A
Sopron	Sopron	Káposztás utcai Stadion	4,500
Szombathelyi Haladás	Szombathely	Haladás Sportkomplexum	8,940
Tatabánya	Tatabánya	Grosics Gyula Stadion	5,021
Veszprém	Veszprém	Városi Stadion	4,000
Újpest II	Budapest (Újpest)	Chinoin Sport és Szabadidő Központ	700
Zsámbék	Zsámbék	Zsámbéki Sportpálya	N/A

==== Northeast ====
Team	Location	Stadium	Cap.
Cigánd	Cigánd	Cigándi Sportpálya	1,670
Debreceni EAC	Debrecen	Dóczy József utcai Sportpálya	3,200
Debreceni VSC II	Debrecen (Pallag)	Debreceni Labdarúgó Akadémia	200
Diósgyőr II	Miskolc (Diósgyőr)	DVTK Training Center	N/A
Eger	Eger	Szentmarjay Tibor Városi Stadion	6,000
Füzesabony	Füzesabony	Füzesabonyi Sporttelep	N/A
Gödöllő	Gödöllő	Szűcs Lajos Sportcentrum	2,500
Hatvan	Hatvan	Népkert Sporttelep	N/A
Kisvárda II	Kisvárda	Várkerti Stadion	2,124
Nyíregyháza II	Nyíregyháza	Örökösföldi Sportelep	N/A
Ózd	Ózd	Városi Stadion	12,000
Putnok	Putnok	Várady Béla Sportközpont	3,000
Sényő	Sényő	Sényői Sportpálya	N/A
Tarpa	Tarpa	Sportcentrum	N/A
Tiszafüred	Tiszafüred	Lipcsey Elemér Sporttelep	N/A
Tiszaújváros	Tiszaújváros	Tiszaújvárosi Sport Park	4,000

==== Southwest ====
Team	Location	Stadium	Cap.
Balatonlelle	Balatonlelle	Balatonlellei Sporttelep	2,000
Dombóvár	Dombóvár	Újvári Kálmán Sporttelep	1,600
Dunaújváros	Dunaújváros	Dunaújvárosi Stadion	12,000
Érd	Érd	Novák Ferenc Sportközpont	3,500
Ferencváros II	Budapest (Ferencváros)	Sárosi György pálya	3,000
Iváncsa	Iváncsa	Károlyi István Sporttelep	N/A
Kaposvár	Kaposvár	Rákóczi Stadion	7,000
Majos	Bonyhád (Majos)	Sport úti Pálya	2,500
MTK Budapest II	Budapest (Józsefváros)	Szőnyi úti Stadion	9,000
Nagykanizsa	Nagykanizsa	Olajbányász Sporttelep	7,000
Paks II	Paks	Fehérvári úti Stadion, Artificial turf pitch	196
PEAC	Pécs	Stadion PMFC	7,000
PMFC	Pécs	Stadion PMFC	7,000
Pénzügyőr	Budapest (Pasarét)	Pasaréti úti Sporttelep	3,000
Siófok	Siófok	Révész Géza utcai Stadion	6,500
Szekszárd	Szekszárd	Városi Stadion	7,500

==== Southeast ====
Team	Location	Stadium	Cap.
III. Kerület	Budapest (Óbuda)	Hévízi úti Stadion	914
Békéscsaba II	Békéscsaba	Kórház utcai Stadion	2,479
BKV Előre	Budapest (Józsefváros)	Sport utcai Stadion	2,500
Budapest Honvéd II	Budapest (Kispest)	Honvéd MFA Utánpótlás Központ	N/A
Csepel	Budapest (Csepel)	Béke téri Stadion	10,000
Dabas	Dabas	Wellis Sportpark	2,500
Dunaharaszti	Dunaharaszti	Dunaharaszti Sportpálya	N/A
ESMTK	Budapest (Pesterzsébet)	Ady Endre utca	5,000
Gyula	Gyula	Christián László Sports Complex	2,700
Hódmezővásárhely	Hódmezővásárhely	Városi Stadion	10,000
Martfű	Martfű	Martfűi Sporttelep	N/A
Monor	Monor	Balassi Bálint utcai Stadion	2,250
Szeged GA	Szeged	Szent Gellért Fórum	8,136
Szegedi VSE	Szeged	Szegedi VSE Stadion	5,000
Tiszaföldvár	Tiszaföldvár	Tiszaföldvári Sportpálya	N/A
Vasas II	Budapest (Angyalföld)	Illovszky Rudolf Stadion	1,000

== Standings ==
=== Northwest (Észak-Nyugat) ===
Pos	Team	Pld	W	D	L	GF	GA	GD	Pts	Promotion or relegation
1	Gyirmót (C, Q)	30	27	1	2	106	20	+86	82	Qualification to promotion play-offs
2	Tatabánya	30	20	2	8	64	37	+27	62	
3	Dorog	30	18	4	8	49	34	+15	58	
4	Puskás Akadémia II	30	17	3	10	58	37	+21	54	
5	Komárom	30	15	6	9	59	45	+14	51	
6	Szombathelyi Haladás	30	15	6	9	43	32	+11	51	
7	Mosonmagyaróvár	30	14	5	11	48	33	+15	47	
8	Veszprém	30	12	8	10	36	37	−1	44	
9	Budaörs	30	12	5	13	53	51	+2	41	
10	Bicske	30	10	6	14	50	51	−1	36	
11	Győri ETO II	30	10	4	16	47	63	−16	34	
12	Újpest II	30	9	7	14	46	50	−4	34	
13	Sopron	30	9	7	14	43	58	−15	34	
14	Pápa (R)	30	6	4	20	43	83	−40	22	Relegation to Megyei Bajnokság I
15	Balatonfüred (R)	30	4	6	20	20	62	−42	18	Relegation to Megyei Bajnokság I
16	Zsámbék (R)	30	3	4	23	35	107	−72	13	Relegation to Megyei Bajnokság I

Updated to match(es) played on 24 May 2026 (complete). Source: Soccerway
Rules for classification: 1) Points; 2) Matches won; 3) Goal difference; 4) Goals scored; 5) Head-to-head points; 6) Head-to-head goal difference; 7) Fair play ranking; 8) Drawing of lots.
(C) Champions; (Q) Qualified for the phase indicated; (R) Relegated

=== Northeast (Észak-Kelet) ===
Pos	Team	Pld	W	D	L	GF	GA	GD	Pts	Promotion or relegation
1	Kisvárda II (Note: Kisvárda II won the championship but the club's first team is in Nemzeti Bajnokság I and cannot advance according to the regulations, so the second-place team (Cigánd) can fight for Nemzeti Bajnokság II membership in the promotion play-offs.) (C)	30	20	7	3	60	22	+38	67	
2	Cigánd (Q)	30	18	7	5	66	30	+36	61	Qualification to promotion play-offs
3	Debreceni EAC	30	18	7	5	63	29	+34	61	
4	Tiszafüred	30	16	8	6	61	36	+25	56	
5	Debreceni VSC II	30	16	7	7	66	40	+26	55	
6	Tarpa	30	12	11	7	39	28	+11	47	
7	Gödöllő	30	11	7	12	52	44	+8	40	
8	Diósgyőr II	30	11	5	14	48	58	−10	38	
9	Nyíregyháza Spartacus II	30	11	4	15	65	56	+9	37	
10	Eger	30	11	4	15	46	71	−25	37	
11	Tiszaújváros	30	9	7	14	41	66	−25	34	
12	Putnok	30	9	5	16	44	52	−8	32	
13	Füzesabony	30	7	9	14	25	41	−16	30	
14	Ózd (R)	30	7	8	15	51	68	−17	29	Relegation to Megyei Bajnokság I
15	Sényő (R)	30	7	7	16	32	74	−42	28	Relegation to Megyei Bajnokság I
16	Hatvan (R)	30	5	1	24	37	81	−44	16	Relegation to Megyei Bajnokság I

Updated to match(es) played on 24 May 2026 (complete). Source: Soccerway
Rules for classification: 1) Points; 2) Matches won; 3) Goal difference; 4) Goals scored; 5) Head-to-head points; 6) Head-to-head goal difference; 7) Fair play ranking; 8) Drawing of lots.
(C) Champions; (Q) Qualified for the phase indicated; (R) Relegated

=== Southwest (Dél-Nyugat) ===
Pos	Team	Pld	W	D	L	GF	GA	GD	Pts	Promotion or relegation
1	Nagykanizsa (C, Q)	30	21	6	3	64	27	+37	69	Qualification to promotion play-offs
2	PMFC	30	20	7	3	71	25	+46	67	
3	Kaposvári Rákóczi	30	20	3	7	64	32	+32	63	
4	Ferencváros II	30	17	4	9	63	43	+20	55	
5	Majos	30	17	3	10	78	49	+29	54	
6	MTK Budapest II	30	16	4	10	62	33	+29	52	
7	Érd	30	15	7	8	47	39	+8	52	
8	Dunaújváros	30	13	10	7	58	42	+16	49	
9	Iváncsa	30	11	6	13	49	44	+5	39	
10	Siófok	30	11	5	14	40	55	−15	38	
11	Paksi II	30	10	2	18	42	62	−20	32	
12	Szekszárd	30	9	4	17	43	75	−32	31	
13	PTE-PEAC (R)	30	6	10	14	39	51	−12	28	Relegation to Megyei Bajnokság I
14	Balatonlelle (R)	30	6	6	18	24	53	−29	24	Relegation to Megyei Bajnokság I
15	Pénzügyőr (R)	30	4	8	18	31	61	−30	20	Relegation to Megyei Bajnokság I
16	Dombóvár (R)	30	0	3	27	22	106	−84	3	Relegation to Megyei Bajnokság I

Updated to match(es) played on 24 May 2026 (complete). Source: Soccerway
Rules for classification: 1) Points; 2) Matches won; 3) Goal difference; 4) Goals scored; 5) Head-to-head points; 6) Head-to-head goal difference; 7) Fair play ranking; 8) Drawing of lots.
(C) Champions; (Q) Qualified for the phase indicated; (R) Relegated

=== Southeast (Dél-Kelet) ===
Pos	Team	Pld	W	D	L	GF	GA	GD	Pts	Promotion or relegation
1	Monor (C, Q)	30	20	7	3	63	31	+32	67	Qualification to promotion play-offs
2	ESMTK	30	21	3	6	70	24	+46	66	
3	Gyula	30	20	5	5	80	24	+56	65	
4	III. Kerület	30	18	7	5	71	38	+33	61	
5	Vasas II	30	14	11	5	65	40	+25	53	
6	Csepel	30	15	4	11	50	41	+9	49	
7	Dabas	30	12	6	12	47	41	+6	42	
8	Budapest Honvéd II	30	11	9	10	40	39	+1	42	
9	Dunaharaszti	30	11	7	12	46	50	−4	40	
10	Hódmezővásárhely	30	10	7	13	48	56	−8	37	
11	Szegedi VSE	30	10	5	15	46	62	−16	35	
12	BKV Előre	30	9	5	16	50	64	−14	32	
13	Szeged GA II (R)	30	7	8	15	37	53	−16	29	Relegation to Megyei Bajnokság I
14	Békéscsaba II (R)	30	7	5	18	30	61	−31	26	Relegation to Megyei Bajnokság I
15	Martfű (R)	30	6	2	22	26	75	−49	20	Relegation to Megyei Bajnokság I
16	Tiszaföldvár (R)	30	3	1	26	25	95	−70	10	Relegation to Megyei Bajnokság I

Updated to match(es) played on 24 May 2026 (complete). Source: Soccerway
Rules for classification: 1) Points; 2) Matches won; 3) Goal difference; 4) Goals scored; 5) Head-to-head points; 6) Head-to-head goal difference; 7) Fair play ranking; 8) Drawing of lots.
(C) Champions; (Q) Qualified for the phase indicated; (R) Relegated

== Season statistics ==
=== Top goalscorers ===
After Regular season, the promotion play-offs matches are not included.

==== Northwest (Észak-Nyugat) ====
As of match played 24 May 2026

Rank	Player	Club	Goals
1	(Hungary) Zalán Gera	Mosonmagyaróvár	24
2	(Hungary) Barnabás László Fehér	Bicske	22
3	(Hungary) Patrik Tischler	Dorog	20
4	(Slovakia) Ákos Szarka	Gyirmót	14
5	(Hungary) József Magasföldi	Puskás Akadémia II	13

==== Northeast (Észak-Kelet) ====
As of match played 24 May 2026

Rank	Player	Club	Goals
1	(Hungary) Zoltán Horváth	Cigánd	24
2	(Hungary) Kristóf Korbély	Ózd-Sajóbölgye	20
3	(Hungary) Tamás Batai	DEAC	17
4	(Hungary) Gábor Boros	Eger	16
5	(Hungary) Vince Fekete	DEAC	15
5	(Hungary) Benjámin Győri	Tiszafüred	15

==== Southwest (Dél-Nyugat) ====
As of match played 24 May 2026

Rank	Player	Club	Goals
1	(Hungary) Zalán Keresztes	Majos	23
2	(Hungary) Bence Lőrincz	Nagykanizsa	20
3	(Ukraine) Yaroslav Helesh	Pécsi MFC	19
4	(Hungary) Ármin Arena	Szekszárd	16
5	(Hungary) Ádám Hampuk	Kaposvár	14

==== Southeast (Dél-Kelet) ====
As of match played 24 May 2026

Rank	Player	Club	Goals
1	(Hungary) Dániel Wirth	III. Kerület	22
2	(Hungary) Csongor Bata	Dunaharaszti	19
2	(Hungary) Krisztián Zádori	Gyula	19
4	(Hungary) Mirkó Halácsi	Csepel	17
5	(Hungary) Alex Burzi	ESMTK	16

== Promotion play-offs ==
Two of the qualifying teams of the four groups of Nemzeti Bajnokság III will replace the two teams eliminated from Nemzeti Bajnokság II this year and will start the 2026–27 season in the second division (Nemzeti Bajnokság II). Promotion is decided by a playoff, in which the qualifying teams from the four groups of Nemzeti Bajnokság III (which does not always mean the champion) play a two-round duel to decide which of them advances one division higher, to 2026–27 Nemzeti Bajnokság II.

In the Northeast group, Cigánd, which finished second place, had to wait for the draw for the qualifiers (because Kisvárda II, which finished in first place, cannot advance according to the announcement, as the club has an Nemzeti Bajnokság I team). In Southeast group, Monor won the championship, Gyirmót in the Northwest and Nagykanizsa in the Southwest, so these four teams competed against each other in the qualifying competition for promotion.

Team 1	Agg.	Team 2	1st leg	2nd leg
Gyirmót	5–3	Monor	2–2	3–1
Nagykanizsa	4–2	Cigánd	2–2	2–0 (a.e.t.)

Promoted teams to 2026–27 Nemzeti Bajnokság II: Gyirmót and Nagykanizsa.

=== Gyirmót–Monor ===
31 May 2026 First leg	Gyirmót	2–2	Monor	Győr-Gyirmót
17:30 CEST	T. Nagy (yellow card) 21'; Lányi (yellow card) 38'; Tömösvári 39'; Kishchun 65'	Report	Puskás (yellow card) 22'; D. Bálint (yellow card) 38'; Hulicsár (yellow card) 40'; L. Horváth (yellow card) 56'; Markó 62'; Farkas 81'; Bedővári (yellow card) 87'	Stadium: Alcufer Stadion; Attendance: 2,120; Referee: Ákos Gaál; Assistant referees: Csaba János Tóth, Dominik Dobos

7 June 2026 Second leg	Monor	1–3 (3–5 agg.)	Gyirmót	Monor
17:00 CEST	Agóts (yellow card) 13'; L. Horváth 46' (yellow card) 50'; Juhász (yellow card) 51'; Farkas (yellow card) 53'; Hulicsár (yellow card) 90+3'	Report	Szarka 33', 34'; Rácz (yellow card) 33'; Bobál (yellow card) 69'; T. Németh (yellow card) 79'; Lányi 90+3' (pen.) (yellow card) 90+3'	Stadium: Balassi Bálint utcai stadion Attendance: 2,200; Referee: Márió Zimmermann; Assistant referees: Gyula Punyi, Levente Balla

=== Nagykanizsa–Cigánd ===
31 May 2026 First leg	Nagykanizsa	2–2	Cigánd	Nagykanizsa
17:30 CEST	Vékony (yellow card) 18'; Eckl 23'; M. Nagy 29' (yellow card) 89'; D. Varga (yellow card) 39'; Ekker (yellow card) 73'	Report	Z. Horváth 15' (yellow card) 90+1'; Girdán 54'; Sikorszki (yellow card) 65'; Iváncsics (yellow card) 90+4'	Stadium: Olajbányász Sporttelep; Attendance: 2,800; Referee: Bálint Juhász; Assistant referees: Milán Mohos, Gergely Holpár

7 June 2026 Second leg	Cigánd	0–2 (a.e.t.) (2–4 agg.)	Nagykanizsa	Cigánd
17:00 CEST	Králik (yellow card) 40'; Juhász (yellow card) 42'; Vass (yellow card) 100'	Report	Ekker (yellow card) 40'; B. Horváth (yellow card) 50'; Godzsajev-Telmán (yellow card) 94'; M. Nagy 108'; D. Varga 112' (yellow card) 113'; Medgyesi (yellow card) 114'; János (yellow card) 119'	Stadium: Városi Stadion; Attendance: 2,000; Referee: Péter Antal; Assistant referees: Norbert Bornemissza, Szabin Topálszki

== Season statistics ==
=== Hat-tricks ===
Player	For	Against	Result	Date	Round
(Hungary) Dávid Irmes	Veszprém	Pápa	3–1 (H)	10 August 2025	3
(Hungary) Krisztián Zádori	Gyula	Dunaharaszti	4–0 (H)	10 August 2025	3
(Nigeria) Teslim Balogun	Kisvárda II	Ózd	6–1 (H)	17 August 2025	4
(Hungary) Zalán Keresztes	Majos	Balatonlelle	6–0 (H)	27 August 2025	5
(Hungary) Ádám Hampuk	Kaposvár	Majos	5–4 (A)	7 September 2025	7
(Hungary) Olivér Varga	Sopron	Újpest FC II	3–2 (A)	21 September 2025	8
(Hungary) Zalán Gera	Mosonmagyaróvár	Budaörs	3–0 (H)	28 September 2025	9
(Hungary) Patrik Tischler (4)	Dorog	Zsámbék	6–2 (H)	8 March 2026	19
(Hungary) Barnabás Fehér	Bicske	Pápa	9–0 (H)	8 March 2026	19
(Hungary) Alex Iván	Gyirmót	Zsámbék	10–0 (H)	22 March 2026	21
(Hungary) Dániel Árvai	Tatabánya	Zsámbék	5–3 (A)	15 April 2026	22
(Hungary) Attila Krán	Szombathelyi Haladás	Sopron	4–1 (H)	11 April 2026	24
(Hungary) Bálint Bagó	Komárom	Pápa	8–2 (H)	19 April 2026	25
(Hungary) Botond Rónaszéki	Budaörs	Zsámbék	8–0 (H)	3 May 2026	27
(Hungary) Patrik Tischler	Dorog	Balatonfüred	3–1 (A)	3 May 2026	27
(Hungary) Ádám Hampuk	Kaposvár	Dombóvár	6–2 (H)	24 May 2026	30

== See also ==
- 2025–26 in Hungarian football
- 2025–26 Magyar Kupa
- 2025–26 Nemzeti Bajnokság I
- 2025–26 Nemzeti Bajnokság II
- 2025–26 Megyei Bajnokság I
