= 2017–18 Nemzeti Bajnokság III =

Nemzeti Bajnokság III
- Season: 2017–18
- Champions: Kaposvár (West); Tiszakécske (Centre); Monor (East)
- Promoted: Kaposvár; Tiszakécske; Monor
- Relegated: Balassagyarmat (East); Csorna (West); Gyirmót II (West); Mórahalom (Centre); Tiszafüred (East); Vecsés (Centre); Veszprém (West)
- All statistics correct as of 28 June 2017.

The 2017–18 Nemzeti Bajnokság III is Hungary's third-level football competition.

On 20 June 2017, the play-offs finished and the full tables were formed. On 26 June 2017, it was announced that the Hungarian Football Federation did not accept the of Szigetszentmiklósi TK. On 12 July 2017, the Hungarian Football Federation issued the three groups of the 2017–18 season.

On 28 March 2018, the STC Salgótarján announced its withdrawal from the 2017–18 Nemzeti Bajnokság III season.

The results for STC Salgótarján were deleted for the entire season due to their withdrawal.

== Teams ==
=== Changes ===
Zone	Promoted from 2016–17 MB I	Relegated from 2016–17 NB II
West	Szabadkikötő, Pápa	Kozármisleny
Centre	Iváncsa, Tiszakécske, Makó, Vecsés	Szegedi EOL
East	Balassagyarmat, Debrecen, Füzesgyarmat, Gyöngyös, Tiszafüred	Cigánd
Zone	Promoted to 2017–18 NB II	Relegated to 2017–18 MB I
West	Győr	Sárvár, Hévíz, Komárom, Diósd, Tatabánya
Centre	Budafok	Békéscsaba II, Gyula, Dabas-Gyón, Méhkerék, Komló
East	Kazincbarcika	Debrecen II, Rákospalota, Hatvan, Hajdúböszörmény, Újpest II

== Standings ==
=== West ===
Pos	Team	Pld	W	D	L	GF	GA	GD	Pts	Promotion or relegation
1	Kaposvár (C, P)	30	22	4	4	66	24	+42	70	Promotion to 2018–19 Nemzeti Bajnokság II
2	Ajka	30	20	4	6	76	31	+45	64	
3	Érd	30	17	6	7	56	34	+22	57	
4	Puskás Akadémia II	30	16	5	9	57	34	+23	53	
5	III. Kerület	30	13	11	6	49	43	+6	50	
6	Andráshida	30	15	3	12	43	41	+2	48	
7	Pápa	30	15	1	14	48	43	+5	46	
8	BKV Előre	30	13	6	11	37	36	+1	45	
9	Csepel	30	12	6	12	43	34	+9	42	
10	Videoton II	30	12	3	15	48	54	−6	39	
11	Dunaharaszti	30	8	9	13	38	46	−8	33	
12	Pénzügyőr	30	8	5	17	32	53	−21	29	
13	Szabadkikötő (O)	30	8	3	19	30	72	−42	27	Qualification for Relegation play-offs
14	Csorna (R)	30	7	5	18	27	55	−28	26	Relegation to 2018–19 Megyei Bajnokság I
15	Gyirmót II (R)	30	6	5	19	28	58	−30	23	Relegation to 2018–19 Megyei Bajnokság I
16	Veszprém (R)	30	6	8	16	38	58	−20	22 (Note: Veszprém deducted 4 points)	Relegation to 2018–19 Megyei Bajnokság I

Source: soccerway.com
Rules for classification: 1st points; 2nd overall wins; 3rd goal difference; 4th head-to-head points; 5th head-to-head goal difference; 6th head-to-head away goals scored; 7th fair-play points; 8th drawing of lots
(C) Champions; (O) Play-off winners; (P) Promoted; (R) Relegated

=== Centre ===
Pos	Team	Pld	W	D	L	GF	GA	GD	Pts	Promotion or relegation
1	Tiszakécske (C, P)	30	22	5	3	75	32	+43	71	Promotion to 2018–19 Nemzeti Bajnokság II
2	Pécs	30	21	5	4	75	23	+52	68	
3	Iváncsa	30	17	9	4	62	41	+21	60	
4	Dunaújváros	30	17	4	9	53	33	+20	55	
5	SZEOL	30	16	5	9	42	29	+13	53	
6	Dabas	30	13	5	12	44	40	+4	44	
7	Szentlőrinc	30	13	5	12	43	42	+1	44	
8	Szekszárd	30	10	9	11	36	41	−5	39	
9	Budapest Honvéd II	30	11	5	14	47	44	+3	38	
10	Paks II	30	11	4	15	39	47	−8	37	
11	Kozármisleny	30	9	7	14	31	45	−14	34	
12	Rákosmente	30	9	6	15	32	41	−9	33	
13	Makó (O)	30	8	7	15	34	62	−28	31	Qualification for Relegation play-offs
14	Hódmezővásárhely	30	8	6	16	30	49	−19	30	Spared from relegation
15	Mórahalom (R)	30	3	8	19	28	62	−34	17	Relegation to 2018–19 Megyei Bajnokság I
16	Vecsés (R)	30	3	8	19	20	60	−40	17	Relegation to 2018–19 Megyei Bajnokság I

Source: soccerway.com
Rules for classification: 1st points; 2nd overall wins; 3rd goal difference; 4th head-to-head points; 5th head-to-head goal difference; 6th head-to-head away goals scored; 7th fair-play points; 8th drawing of lots
(C) Champions; (O) Play-off winners; (P) Promoted; (R) Relegated

=== East ===
Pos	Team	Pld	W	D	L	GF	GA	GD	Pts	Promotion or relegation
1	Monor (C, P)	28	24	4	0	77	18	+59	76	Promotion to 2018–19 Nemzeti Bajnokság II
2	ESMTK	28	14	8	6	37	24	+13	50	
3	Putnok	28	13	7	8	46	40	+6	46	
4	Tiszaújváros	28	12	7	9	43	40	+3	43	
5	Diósgyőr II	28	11	5	12	41	34	+7	38	
6	Jászberény	28	9	11	8	36	35	+1	38	
7	Nyírbátor	28	10	7	11	47	42	+5	37	
8	Füzesgyarmat	28	10	6	12	38	39	−1	36	
9	Gyöngyös	28	9	9	10	41	45	−4	36	
10	Cigánd	28	10	5	13	41	51	−10	35	
11	DEAC	28	10	4	14	42	57	−15	34	
12	MTK Budapest II	28	9	7	12	45	40	+5	34	
13	Tállya (O)	28	7	8	13	32	49	−17	29	Qualification for Relegation play-offs
14	Balassagyarmat (R)	28	6	7	15	33	59	−26	25	Relegation to 2018–19 Megyei Bajnokság I
15	Tiszafüred (R)	28	7	3	18	32	58	−26	24	Relegation to 2018–19 Megyei Bajnokság I
16	Salgótarján (R)	0	0	0	0	0	0	0	0	Relegation to 2018–19 Megyei Bajnokság I

Source: soccerway.com
Rules for classification: 1st points; 2nd overall wins; 3rd goal difference; 4th head-to-head points; 5th head-to-head goal difference; 6th head-to-head away goals scored; 7th fair-play points; 8th drawing of lots
(C) Champions; (O) Play-off winners; (P) Promoted; (R) Relegated

== Season statistics ==
=== Top goalscorers - West ===
Rank	Player	Club	Goals
1	(Hungary) Zsolt Szabó	Pápa	20
2	(Hungary) Ádám Hamar	III. Ker.	15
3	(Hungary) Vilmos Melczer	Érd	13

Updated to games played on 3 June 2018

== Promotion and relegation play-off ==
Promoted: Taksony, Méhkeréki SE and Sényő qualified on slots. The following champions did not assume the Nemzeti Bajnokság III, although they won their county championships: Tolna, Algyő and Pécsvárad

=== 2nd leg ===
16 June 2018	Sárvári FC	1–0 (1–0 agg.)	Rákospalotai EAC	Sárvár, Hungary
20:00 CET	Venczel 116'	Report		Referee: (Hungary)

16 June 2018	Balatonfüred	0–1 (1–6 agg.)	Egri FC	Balatonfüred, Hungary
20:00 CET	Vajda 10'	Report		Referee: (Hungary)

16 June 2018	Sajóbábony	2–1 (4–4 agg.)	Szajol	Sajóbábony, Hungary
20:00 CET	Sebők 14'; Lázi 82'	Report	87' Dobos	Referee: (Hungary)

16 June 2018	Nagyatád	0–2 (0–7 agg.)	Nagykanizsa FC	Nagyatád, Hungary
20:00 CET		Report	62' Horváth; 88' Szalai	Referee: (Hungary)

16 June 2018	Hajdúböszörményi TE	3–1 (3–5 agg.)	Kecskemét	Hajdúböszörmény, Hungary
20:00 CET	Jeremiás 17'; Barna 20'; Lippai 66'	Report	49' Vladul	Referee: (Hungary)

16 June 2018	Salgótarján	1–0 (3–4 agg.)	Ménfőcsanak	Salgótarján, Hungary
20:00 CET	Tarlósi 28'	Report		Referee: (Hungary)

16 June 2018	Maroshegy	1–2 (1–4 agg.)	Komárom VSE	Maroshegy, Hungary
20:00 CET	Bencze 56'	Report	9' Solymosi; 33' Kenesei	Referee: (Hungary)

== See also ==
- 2017–18 Magyar Kupa
- 2018 Magyar Kupa Final
- 2017–18 Nemzeti Bajnokság I
- 2017–18 Nemzeti Bajnokság II
- 2017–18 Megyei Bajnokság I
