= Cigánd SE =

Hungarian football club

- Full name: Cigánd Sport Egyesület
- Nickname: Wasps
- Founded: 1998; 28 years ago
- Ground: Cigándi Sportpálya
- Capacity: 2,117
- Chairman: Gábor Nagy
- Manager: István Paulik
- League: NB III; Northeast
- 2023–24: NB III; Northeast, 2nd of 16
- Website: cigandse.hu
colours	colours	colours

Cigánd SE is a Hungarian football club based in Cigánd, Hungary.They play their home games at the Cigándi Sportpálya.

== Honours ==
- Nemzeti Bajnokság III:
  - Winners (1): 2025–26

== Season results ==
As of 6 August 2017

Domestic												International		Manager	Ref.
Nemzeti Bajnokság											Magyar Kupa	International		Manager	Ref.
Div.	No.	Season	MP	W	D	L	GF–GA	Dif.	Pts.	Pos.	Magyar Kupa	Competition	Result	Manager	Ref.
NBIII	?.	2017–18	0	0	0	0	0–0	+0	0	TBD	TBD	Did not qualify		(Hungary)	
Σ		0	0	0	0	0–0	+0	0							
