= Zalán Keresztes =

Hungarian footballer

Personal information
- Date of birth: 17 June 2001 (age 25)
- Place of birth: Dombóvár, Hungary
- Position: Centre forward

Team information
- Current team: Veszprém

Youth career
- 2007–2011: Dombóvár
- 2011-2020: Kaposvár

Senior career*
Years	Team	Apps	(Gls)
2020	Kaposvár	2	(0)
2020–	Veszprém	42	(4)
- * Club domestic league appearances and goals as of 27 March 2022

Zalán Keresztes (born 17 June 2001) is a Hungarian professional footballer who plays for Veszprém (Forward)

== Career statistics ==
As of 17 June 2020.

Appearances and goals by club, season and competition
Club	Season	League			Cup		Continental		Other		Total	
Club	Season	Division	Apps	Goals	Apps	Goals	Apps	Goals	Apps	Goals	Apps	Goals
Kaposvár	2019–20	Nemzeti Bajnokság I	2	0	0	0	—		0	0	2	0
Kaposvár	Total		2	0	0	0	0	0	0	0	2	0
Career total			2	0	0	0	0	0	0	0	2	0
