= Somos SE =

Hungarian football club

STC Salgótarján
- Full name: STC Salgótarján
- Founded: 2007
- Ground: Szojka Ferenc Stadium
- Capacity: 7,000
- League: Megyei I
- 2017–18: NB III, East, 16th (relegated)
Home colours

STC Salgótarján is a professional football club based in Salgótarján, Nógrád County, Hungary, that competes in the Nemzeti Bajnokság III, the third tier of Hungarian football.

== History ==
STC Salgótarján is going to compete in the 2017–18 Nemzeti Bajnokság III.

On 28 March 2018, the club announced its withdrawal from the 2017-18 Nemzeti Bajnokság III season.

The results of the 2017–18 Nemzeti Bajnoksáh III were cancelled for the club.

== Honours ==
=== Domestic ===
- Nógrád I:
  - Winner (1): 2016–17

== Managers ==
- (Hungary) György Véber 2015

== Season results ==
As of 6 August 2017

| Domestic | | | | | | | | | | | | International | | Manager | Ref. |
| Nemzeti Bajnokság | | | | | | | | | | | Magyar Kupa | International | | Manager | Ref. |
| Div. | No. | Season | MP | W | D | L | GF–GA | Dif. | Pts. | Pos. | Magyar Kupa | Competition | Result | Manager | Ref. |
|---|---|---|---|---|---|---|---|---|---|---|---|---|---|---|---|
| NBIII | ?. | 2017–18 | 0 | 0 | 0 | 0 | 0–0 | +0 | 0 | TBD | TBD | Did not qualify | | (Hungary) | |
| Σ | | 0 | 0 | 0 | 0 | 0–0 | +0 | 0 | | | | | | | |
