= Hajdúböszörményi TE =

Hungarian football club

- Full name: Hajdúböszörményi Torna Egylet
- Nicknames: HTE, Boszi, Böszike
- Founded: 1919
- Ground: Városi Stadion, Hajdúböszörmény, Hungary
- Capacity: 2,800
- Chairman: Komáromi Imre
- Manager: Florian Zsolt
- League: Megyei bajnoskág I
- Website: http://www.hte.gportal.hu
Home colours	Away colours

Hajdúböszörményi TE is a Hungarian football club from the city of Hajdúböszörmény. It was founded in 1919 and currently plays in the Megyei Bajnoskág I, fourth tier on Hungarian football.

== Current squad ==
Note: Flags indicate national team as defined under FIFA eligibility rules; some limited exceptions apply. Players may hold more than one non-FIFA nationality.

No.	Pos.	Nation	Player
—	GK	HUN	Norbert Bákonyi
—	GK	HUN	Csaba Tóth
—	DF	HUN	László Király
—	DF	HUN	Ferenc Papp
—	DF	HUN	Attila Hortó
—	DF	HUN	Ferenc Frida
—	DF	HUN	Balazs Kerek
—	DF	HUN	Krisztián Póti
—	DF	HUN	Péter Usztics
—	MF	HUN	László Kiss
—	MF	HUN	Attila Bellon

No.	Pos.	Nation	Player
—	MF	HUN	Tamás Arnokzki
—	MF	HUN	Márton Lovas
—	MF	HUN	Krisztián Szilágyi
—	MF	HUN	László Kádar
—	MF	HUN	Mihály Varga
—	MF	ROU	Eduard Tatar
—	MF	HON	Luis Ramos
—	FW	HUN	Adám Kolbe
—	FW	HUN	David Nagy
—	FW	HUN	Péter Urbin

== Season results ==
As of 6 August 2017

Domestic												International		Manager	Ref.
Nemzeti Bajnokság											Magyar Kupa	International		Manager	Ref.
Div.	No.	Season	MP	W	D	L	GF–GA	Dif.	Pts.	Pos.	Magyar Kupa	Competition	Result	Manager	Ref.
NBIII	?.	2016–17	34	8	5	21	33–72	-39	29	17th	L128	Did not qualify		(Hungary)	
NBIII	?.	2017–18	0	0	0	0	0–0	+0	0	TBD	TBD	Did not qualify		(Hungary)	
Σ		0	0	0	0	0–0	+0	0							
