= 2017–18 Nemzeti Bajnokság I =

Nemzeti Bajnokság I
- Season: 2017–18
- Dates: 15 July 2017 – 2 June 2018
- Champions: Videoton
- Relegated: Balmazújváros; Vasas
- Champions League: Videoton
- Europa League: Ferencváros; Újpest; Honvéd
- Top goalscorer: Davide Lanzafame (18 goals)
- Biggest home win: Ferencváros 5–0 Mezőkövesd; Diósgyőr 5–0 Vasas; Ferencváros 5–0 Balmazújváros
- Biggest away win: Haladás 1–5 Puskás Akadémia; Vasas 1–5 Debrecen
- Highest scoring: Ferencváros 5–2 Vasas; Honvéd 4–3 Puskás Akadémia; Debrecen 2–5 Videoton; Ferencváros 5–2 Honvéd
- Highest attendance: 19,125; Ferencváros 2–1 Debrecen
- Lowest attendance: 200; Puskás Akadémia 0–0 Debrecen

The 2017–18 Nemzeti Bajnokság I (also known as 2017–18 OTP Bank Liga), also known as NB I, was the 119th season of top-tier football in Hungary. The league was officially named OTP Bank Liga for sponsorship reasons. Honvéd were the defending champions, having won their fourteenth Hungarian league title. As in the previous season, 12 teams competed for the championship title and played 33 matches. The fixtures were published on 14 July 2017.

On 20 June 2017, the rounds were drawn by the Hungarian Football Federation. The 33 rounds was divided into two parts. 19 rounds were played in 2017 and the remaining 14 in 2018.

== Teams ==
MTK and Gyirmót finished the 2016–17 Nemzeti Bajnokság I in the last two places and thus were relegated to NB II division.

The two relegated teams were replaced with the top two teams in 2016–17 Nemzeti Bajnokság II, champion Puskás Akadémia and runner-up Balmazújváros, each having the required licence for top-division play.

=== Stadium and locations ===
Following is the list of clubs competed in the league this season, with their location, stadium and stadium capacity.

Team	Location	Stadium	Capacity	Ref
Balmazújváros	Balmazújváros	Városi Sportpálya	2,435	
Debrecen	Debrecen	Nagyerdei Stadion	20,340	
Diósgyőr	Miskolc	Diósgyőri Stadion ^{1}	15,325	
Diósgyőr	Debrecen	Nagyerdei Stadion	20,340	
Ferencváros	Budapest (Ferencváros)	Groupama Aréna	23,700	
Haladás	Szombathely	Haladás Sportkomplexum ^{2}	9,859	
Haladás	Sopron	Káposztás utcai Stadion ^{2}	5,300	
Honvéd	Budapest (Kispest)	Bozsik József Stadion	10,000	
Mezőkövesd	Mezőkövesd	Városi Stadion	4,183	
Paks	Paks	Fehérvári úti Stadion	6,150	
Puskás Akadémia	Felcsút	Pancho Aréna	3,816	
Újpest	Budapest (Újpest)	Szusza Ferenc Stadion	13,501	
Vasas	Budapest (Angyalföld)	Szusza Ferenc Stadion ^{3}	13,501	
Videoton	Felcsút	Pancho Aréna ^{4}	3,816	

Notes

- Note 1: Diósgyőri Stadion was demolished in 2016, while their proposed stadium, Diósgyőri Stadion was under construction. Therefore, Diósgyőr played their home matches in Nagyerdei Stadion, since their original stadium, Diósgyőri Stadion (1939) was demolished. From 5 May 2018, Diósgyőr played their home matches at the new Diósgyőri Stadion.
- Note 2: Szombathelyi Haladás VSE played their home matches at the Káposztás utcai Stadion, in Sopron since their original stadium, Rohonci úti Stadion was demolished in 2016. From 21 November 2017 Haladás played their home matches at the new Haladás Sportkomplexum.
- Note 3: Vasas's original stadium, Illovszky Rudolf Stadion (1960) was demolished, while their proposed stadium, Illovszky Rudolf Stadion was under construction.
- Note 4: Videoton's original stadium, Sóstói Stadion (1967) was demolished in 2016, while their proposed stadium, Sóstói Stadion was under construction.

Balmazújváros	Debrecen	Diósgyőr	Ferencváros
Városi Sportpálya	Nagyerdei Stadion	Diósgyőri Stadion	Groupama Aréna
Capacity: 2,435	Capacity: 20,340	Capacity: 15,325	Capacity: 23,700
Haladás	Location of teams in 2017–18 Nemzeti Bajnokság I Location of Budapest teams		Honvéd
Haladás Sportkomplexum	Location of teams in 2017–18 Nemzeti Bajnokság I Location of Budapest teams		Bozsik József Stadion
Capacity: 9,859	Location of teams in 2017–18 Nemzeti Bajnokság I Location of Budapest teams		Capacity: 10,000
Mezőkövesd	Location of teams in 2017–18 Nemzeti Bajnokság I Location of Budapest teams		Paks
Városi-Stadion	Location of teams in 2017–18 Nemzeti Bajnokság I Location of Budapest teams		Fehérvári úti Stadion
Capacity: 4,183	Location of teams in 2017–18 Nemzeti Bajnokság I Location of Budapest teams		Capacity: 6,150
Puskás Akadémia	Újpest	Vasas	Videoton
Pancho Aréna	Szusza Ferenc Stadion	Szusza Ferenc Stadion	Pancho Aréna
Capacity: 3,816	Capacity: 13,501	Capacity: 13,501	Capacity: 3,816

=== Personnel and kits ===
Following is the list of clubs competed in the league this season, with their manager, captain, kit manufacturer and shirt sponsor.
Note: Flags indicate national team as has been defined under FIFA eligibility rules. Players and Managers may hold more than one non-FIFA nationality.

Team	Manager		Captain		Kit manufacturer	Shirt sponsor
Team		Name		Name	Kit manufacturer	Shirt sponsor
Balmazújváros	(Hungary)	Ferenc Horváth	(Hungary)	Dávid Sigér	Adidas	Kamilla Gyógy-, Termál- és Strandfürdő
Debrecen	(Hungary)	András Herczeg	(Hungary)	Dániel Tőzsér	Adidas	TEVA
Diósgyőr	(Spain)	Fernando	(Hungary)	Zoltán Lipták	Nike	Borsodi
Ferencváros	(Germany)	Thomas Doll	(Hungary)	Dániel Böde	Nike	Magyar Telekom
Haladás	(Slovakia)	Michal Hipp	(Hungary)	Péter Halmosi	Adidas	Swietelsky
Honvéd	(Hungary)	Attila Supka	(Bosnia and Herzegovina)	Đorđe Kamber	Macron	–
Mezőkövesd	(Hungary)	Attila Kuttor	(Hungary)	Dávid Hegedűs	Adidas	Cronus, Zsóry
Paks	(Hungary)	Aurél Csertői	(Hungary)	Tamás Báló	Jako	–
Puskás Akadémia	(Hungary)	Attila Pintér	(Hungary)	Attila Polonkai	Adidas	Mészáros és Mészáros Kft.
Újpest	(Serbia)	Nebojša Vignjević	(Hungary)	Róbert Litauszki	Joma	Gallica
Vasas	(Germany)	Michael Oenning	(Hungary)	András Debreceni	Adidas	Alprosys
Videoton	(Serbia)	Marko Nikolić	(Hungary)	Roland Juhász	Adidas	MOL

==== Managerial changes ====
Team	Outgoing manager	Manner of departure	Date of vacancy	Position in table	Replaced by	Date of appointment
Honvéd	(Italy) Marco Rossi	Resigned	End of 2016–17 season	Pre-season	(Netherlands) Erik van der Meer	28 May 2017
Videoton	(Norway) Henning Berg	Contract terminated	End of 2016–17 season	Pre-season	(Serbia) Marko Nikolić	6 June 2017
Balmazújváros	(Hungary) Tamás Feczkó	Contract run out	End of 2016–17 season	Pre-season	(Hungary) Ferenc Horváth	14 June 2017
Haladás	(Hungary) Géza Mészöly	Mutual agreement	29 August 2017	10th	(Hungary) Bálint Pacsi	30 August 2017
Mezőkövesd	(Slovakia) Mikuláš Radványi	Mutual agreement	16 October 2017	11th	(Hungary) Attila Kuttor	17 October 2017
Haladás	(Hungary) Bálint Pacsi	Sacked	8 November 2017	11th	(Slovakia) Michal Hipp	13 November 2017
Honvéd	(Netherlands) Erik van der Meer	Sacked	9 December 2017	4th	(Hungary) Attila Supka	10 December 2017
Diósgyőr	(Hungary) Tamás Bódog	Sacked	23 April 2018	9th	(Spain) Fernando	23 April 2018

== League table ==
Pos	Team	Pld	W	D	L	GF	GA	GD	Pts	Qualification or relegation
1	Videoton (C)	33	20	8	5	65	28	+37	68	Qualification for the Champions League first qualifying round
2	Ferencváros	33	18	12	3	69	31	+38	66	Qualification for the Europa League first qualifying round (Note: Since the winners of the 2017–18 Magyar Kupa, Újpest, qualified for European competition based on league position, the spot awarded to the cup winners (Europa League first qualifying round) was passed to the fourth-placed team.)
3	Újpest	33	12	13	8	41	38	+3	49	Qualification for the Europa League first qualifying round
4	Honvéd	33	13	8	12	50	53	−3	47	Qualification for the Europa League first qualifying round
5	Debrecen	33	12	8	13	53	47	+6	44	
6	Puskás Akadémia	33	11	10	12	41	46	−5	43	
7	Paks	33	11	9	13	43	48	−5	42	
8	Szombathelyi Haladás	33	11	5	17	35	50	−15	38	
9	Mezőkövesd	33	9	10	14	35	52	−17	37	
10	Diósgyőr	33	10	6	17	44	53	−9	36	
11	Balmazújváros (R)	33	8	12	13	39	46	−7	36	Relegation to the Nemzeti Bajnokság II
12	Vasas (R)	33	9	7	17	38	61	−23	34	Relegation to the Nemzeti Bajnokság II

Source: Hungarian Football Federation (in Hungarian), Soccerway
Rules for classification: 1) Points; 2) Matches won; 3) Goal difference; 4) Goals scored; 5) Head-to-head points; 6) Head-to-head goal difference; 7) Head-to-head away goals scored; 8) Fair play ranking; 9) Drawing of lots.
(C) Champions; (R) Relegated

=== Positions by round ===
Team ╲ Round	1	2	3	4	5	6	7	8	9	10	11	12	13	14	15	16	17	18	19	20	21	22	23	24	25	26	27	28	29	30	31	32	33
Videoton	9	4	6	2	2	2	1	1	1	1	1	1	1	2	1	1	1	1	2	2	2	2	2	2	2	2	1	2	2	1	1	1	1
Ferencváros	7	8	4	6	6	3	5	3	2	2	2	2	2	1	2	2	2	2	1	1	1	1	1	1	1	1	2	1	1	2	2	2	2
Újpest	5	7	8	7	9	7	6	8	9	7	8	9	9	9	8	5	5	4	5	4	4	4	3	4	6	4	3	3	4	6	5	3	3
Honvéd	1	2	5	1	1	1	2	2	3	4	6	5	5	4	4	4	4	5	4	5	6	7	6	6	4	5	5	4	6	4	3	5	4
Debrecen	10	12	11	11	11	11	7	5	4	3	3	3	3	3	3	3	3	3	3	3	3	3	4	5	3	3	4	6	5	3	4	4	5
Puskás Akadémia	8	11	12	12	12	12	8	6	5	5	7	8	8	8	9	9	9	9	8	8	8	8	10	9	8	9	7	7	7	7	7	7	6
Paks	4	9	9	9	8	8	11	10	8	8	5	6	7	7	6	8	8	6	7	6	7	5	5	3	5	6	6	5	3	5	6	6	7
Haladás	11	5	7	10	7	9	10	11	10	10	10	10	10	10	11	11	11	11	10	11	9	10	11	11	9	7	8	8	8	8	9	9	8
Mezőkövesd	3	1	3	5	5	6	9	9	11	11	11	11	11	12	12	12	12	12	12	12	12	12	8	10	11	11	11	12	9	9	8	8	9
Diósgyőr	2	3	1	3	3	4	3	4	7	9	9	7	6	5	5	6	6	7	6	7	5	6	7	7	7	8	9	9	10	11	10	12	10
Balmazújváros	6	10	10	8	10	10	12	12	12	12	12	12	12	11	10	10	10	10	11	9	10	11	12	12	12	10	10	11	12	12	11	10	11
Vasas	12	6	2	4	4	5	4	7	6	6	4	4	4	6	7	7	7	8	9	10	11	9	9	8	10	12	12	10	11	10	12	11	12

Source: mlsz.hu (in Hungarian)
= Leader; = 2018–19 UEFA Europa League First qualifying round; = Relegation to 2018–19 Nemzeti Bajnokság II

== Results ==
In the first 22 rounds each team played against every other team home-and-away in a round-robin format. In the remaining 11 rounds, the first six placed teams from the previous season played six matches at home and five matches away, and the remaining six teams played five matches at home and six matches away.

=== Rounds 1–22 ===
Home \ Away	BAL	DEB	DIÓ	FER	SZO	HON	MEZ	PAK	PUS	ÚJP	VAS	VID
Balmazújváros	—	0–1	4–0	2–3	2–1	0–3	0–0	0–0	2–2	0–1	0–1	1–1
Debrecen	0–2	—	3–1	0–0	1–1	1–0	1–2	3–2	3–0	1–2	4–1	2–5
Diósgyőr	1–2	3–2	—	2–1	1–2	2–1	2–1	2–4	2–2	1–2	5–0	2–3
Ferencváros	5–0	2–1	2–0	—	2–0	5–2	5–0	1–1	1–1	1–0	5–2	3–1
Haladás	3–1	1–0	0–3	2–1	—	1–2	2–2	1–2	1–5	1–0	3–0	1–0
Honvéd	2–2	1–3	2–2	1–3	2–0	—	1–2	1–0	4–3	2–1	1–4	1–4
Mezőkövesd	2–2	0–2	0–0	0–1	2–1	1–2	—	3–2	0–0	2–4	3–3	0–2
Paks	1–0	1–1	2–1	0–2	2–0	2–2	1–1	—	3–1	2–2	3–1	1–4
Puskás Akadémia	2–1	0–0	1–0	1–1	1–3	0–2	1–0	1–2	—	2–1	0–0	1–3
Újpest	2–2	1–1	1–1	2–2	1–0	2–1	2–3	0–0	1–3	—	1–0	2–2
Vasas	1–2	1–5	0–2	0–2	1–0	2–1	1–1	3–1	2–0	0–1	—	3–1
Videoton	1–1	1–0	4–1	3–1	3–1	1–1	4–0	2–0	2–0	2–2	2–1	—

Source: Hungarian Football Federation (in Hungarian)
Legend: Blue = home team win; Yellow = draw; Red = away team win.

=== Rounds 23–33 ===
Home \ Away	BAL	DEB	DIÓ	FER	SZO	HON	MEZ	PAK	PUS	ÚJP	VAS	VID
Balmazújváros	—	4–0	2–1	3–3	—	—	—	—	—	1–1	1–1	—
Debrecen	—	—	2–1	1–1	—	—	2–3	—	1–1	—	2–3	—
Diósgyőr	—	—	—	—	—	1–1	0–1	1–0	0–1	—	—	2–1
Ferencváros	—	—	4–0	—	2–1	—	3–0	2–2	3–1	—	1–1	—
Haladás	0–0	1–1	—	—	—	—	1–0	—	3–2	1–1	—	—
Honvéd	2–0	1–3	—	1–1	2–1	—	—	—	—	0–0	3–1	—
Mezőkövesd	1–0	—	—	—	—	1–2	—	2–3	—	0–1	—	0–0
Paks	0–1	2–5	—	—	1–2	1–2	—	—	—	0–0	—	1–0
Puskás Akadémia	3–1	—	—	—	—	1–1	1–2	1–0	—	—	—	0–0
Újpest	—	2–1	1–0	0–0	—	—	—	—	0–1	—	4–2	—
Vasas	—	—	1–1	—	1–0	—	0–0	0–1	1–2	—	—	0–3
Videoton	1–0	1–0	—	0–0	3–0	2–0	—	—	—	3–0	—	—

Source: Hungarian Football Federation (in Hungarian)
Legend: Blue = home team win; Yellow = draw; Red = away team win.
For upcoming matches, an "a" indicates there is an article about the rivalry between the two participants.

== Season statistics ==
=== Top goalscorers ===
Rank	Player	Club	Goals
1	(Italy) Davide Lanzafame	Honvéd	18
2	(Hungary) Soma Novothny	Újpest	17
2	(Hungary) Roland Varga	Ferencváros	17
4	(Hungary) Márton Eppel	Honvéd	14
4	(Serbia) Danko Lazović	Videoton	14
6	(Hungary) Dániel Böde	Ferencváros	13
7	(Switzerland) Haris Tabaković	Debrecen	12
8	(Croatia) Josip Knežević	Puskás	11
9	(Hungary) Márk Koszta	Mezőkövesd	10
9	(Ghana) Joseph Paintsil	Ferencváros	10
9	(Serbia) Marko Šćepović	Videoton	10

Updated to games played on 3 June 2018

=== Hat-tricks ===
Name	For	Against	Round	Result	Date
(Hungary) Dániel Böde	Ferencváros	Balmazújváros	22nd	5–0	10 March 2018
(Serbia) Marko Šćepović	Videoton	Debrecen	16th	2–5	18 November 2017
(Hungary) Mohamed Remili	Vasas	Honvéd	11th	1–4	30 September 2017
(Hungary) Soma Novothny	Újpest	Mezőkövesd	10th	2–4	23 September 2017
(Hungary) Roland Varga	Ferencváros	Vasas	8th	5–2	9 September 2017

== Attendances ==
Pos	Team	Total	High	Low	Average	Change
1	Ferencváros	154,120	19,125	4,911	9,066	+34.9%
2	Debrecen	62,649	10,841	1,635	3,916	+14.9%
3	Újpest	38,081	9,596	1,546	3,462	+41.2%^{2}
4	Diósgyőr	54,869	12,753	1,081	3,429	+3.8%^{4}
5	Haladás	52,566	8,028	1,075	3,092	+75.2%^{3}
6	Honvéd	42,673	4,680	1,212	2,510	−9.1%
7	Mezőkövesd	37,530	3,643	1,256	2,346	+11.8%
8	Videoton	35,715	3,474	1,108	2,101	+1.4%
9	Balmazújváros	23,675	2,291	578	1,480	+44.7%^{1}
10	Vasas	22,445	2,514	600	1,320	−57.1%
11	Puskás Akadémia	19,176	3,127	200	1,199	+46.6%^{1}
12	Paks	17,580	2,000	400	1,034	−31.4%
	League total	561,079	19,125	200	2,907	+7.5%

Source: League matches: NB I 2017/2018
Notes:
1: Played last season in NB/II.
2: Újpest played four matches under closed doors, not included in the stats.
3: Haladás played nine matches out of their stadium until it was opened.
4: Diósgyőr played 13 matches out of their stadium until it was opened.

== See also ==
- 2017–18 Magyar Kupa
- 2018 Magyar Kupa Final
- 2017–18 Nemzeti Bajnokság II
- 2017–18 Nemzeti Bajnokság III
- 2017–18 Megyei Bajnokság I
