= Gyöngyösi AK =

Hungarian football club

- Full name: Gyöngyösi Atlétikai Klub
- Founded: 1906; 120 years ago
- Ground: Kömlei Károly Városi Sporttelep
- Capacity: 3,000
- League: NB III
- 2022–23: MB I, Heves, 1st of 13 (promoted via play-offs)
Home colours

Gyöngyösi Atlétikai Klub is a professional football club based in Gyöngyös, Heves County, Hungary, that competes in the Nemzeti Bajnokság III, the third tier of Hungarian football.

== History ==
Gyöngyös is going to compete in the 2017–18 Nemzeti Bajnokság III.

== Honours ==
=== Domestic ===
- Heves I:
  - Winner (1): 2016–17

== Season results ==
As of 6 August 2017

Domestic												International		Manager	Ref.
Nemzeti Bajnokság											Magyar Kupa	International		Manager	Ref.
Div.	No.	Season	MP	W	D	L	GF–GA	Dif.	Pts.	Pos.	Magyar Kupa	Competition	Result	Manager	Ref.
NBIII	?.	2017–18	0	0	0	0	0–0	+0	0	TBD	TBD	Did not qualify			
Σ		0	0	0	0	0–0	+0	0							
