= Pápai PFC =

Hungarian football club

- Full name: Pápai Perutz Futball Club
- Founded: 2015; 11 years ago
- Ground: Perutz Stadion
- League: NB III
- 2020–21: NB III, West, 14th
- Website: https://perutzfc.hu/
Home colours

Pápai Perutz Futball Club is a professional football club based in Pápa, Hungary, that competes in the Nemzeti Bajnokság III, the third tier of Hungarian football.

== History ==
Pápai FC qualified for the 2017–18 Nemzeti Bajnokság III season on slots.

On 16 December 2025, Patrik Jurik was appointed as the manager of the club.

== Honours ==
=== Domestic ===
- Megyei Bajnokság I:
  - Winner (1): 2016–17

== Seasons ==
The table below shows the seasons of Pápai PFC.

Season	Tier	Club's name	Position	Pts	Manager
2015–16	4	Pápai Perutz FC	3 / 18	75	
2016–17	4	Pápai Perutz FC	1 / 16	87	
2017–18	3	Pápai Perutz FC	7 / 16	46	
2018–19	3	Pápai Perutz FC	8 / 16	40	
2019–20	3	Pápai Perutz FC	5 / 16	30	Ferenc Lengyel
2020–21	3	Pápai Perutz FC	14 / 20	48	
2021–22	3	Pápai Perutz FC	7 / 20	59	
2022–23	4	Pápai Perutz FC	2 / 16	63	
2023–24	4	Pápai Perutz FC	3 / 16	69	
2024–25	4	Frutti Drink-Perutz FC	1 / 15	71	
2025–26	3	Frutti Drink-Perutz FC	14 / 16	22	Attila Kun-Szabó, Patrik Jurik
