= Mórahalom VSE =

Hungarian football club

- Full name: Mórahalom Városi Sportegylet
- Founded: 1936
- Ground: Móradomb körúti stadium
- Capacity: 1,288
- League: MB I
- 2017–18: NB III, Centre, 15th (relegated)
Home colours

Mórahalom Városi Sportegylet is a professional football club based in Mórahalom, Csongrád County, Hungary, that competes in the Nemzeti Bajnokság III, the third tier of Hungarian football.
