= Pénzügyőr SE =

Hungarian football club

- Full name: Pénzügyőr Sportegyesület
- Founded: 1950; 76 years ago
- Ground: Pasaréti út
- Capacity: 3,000
- Manager: László Major
- League: NB III; Southeast
- 2023–24: NB III; Southeast, 13th of 16
- Website: https://penzugyorse.hu/
Home colours

Pénzügyőr Sportegyesület is a professional football club based in Pasarét, Budapest, Hungary, that competes in the Nemzeti Bajnokság III – Southeast, the third tier of Hungarian football.

== History ==
The club was established in 1950.

== Honours ==
=== Domestic ===
- Nemzeti Bajnokság III:
  - Winners (2): 1970–71, 1991–92

== Seasons ==
The table below shows the seasons of Pénzügyőr SE.

| Season | Tier | Club's name | Position | Pts |
|---|---|---|---|---|
| 1949–50 | 4 | Pénzügyőrök | 9 / 16 | 24 |
| 1950 | 3 | Pénzügyőri SE | 4 / 16 | 19 |
| 1951 | 3 | Pénzügyőrök | 4 / 12 | 28 |
| 1952 | 2 | Pénzügyőrök SE | 16 / 18 | 23 |
| 1953 | 3 | Pénzügyőrök SE | 1 / 16 | 48 |
| 1954 | 2 | Pénzügyőrök | 4 / 16 | 38 |
| 1955 | 2 | Pénzügyőrök | 5 / 16 | 30 |
| 1956 | 2 | Pénzügyőrök SE | 6 / 16 | 32 |
| 1957–58 | 2 | Pénzügyőrök SE | 6 / 19 | 40 |
| 1958–59 | 2 | Pénzügyőrök SE | 13 / 16 | 25 |
| 1959–60 | 2 | Pénzügyőrök SE | 6 / 16 | 32 |
| 1960–61 | 2 | Pénzügyőr SE | 9 / 16 | 29 |
| 1961–62 | 2 | Pénzügyőrök SE | 16 / 16 | 21 |
| 1962–63 | 3 | Pénzügyőrök | 5 / 16 | 33 |
| 1963 | 4 | Pénzügyőrök SE | 1 / 16 | 22 |
| 1964 | 4 | Pénzügyőr | 1 / 16 | 42 |
| 1965 | 3 | Pénzügyőr SE | 4 / 18 | 41 |
| 1966 | 3 | Pénzügyőr SE | 8 / 18 | 34 |
| 1967 | 3 | Pénzügyőr SE | 9 / 16 | 29 |
| 1968 | 3 | Pénzügyőr SE | 6 / 16 | 33 |
| 1969 | 3 | Pénzügyőr SE | 4 / 16 | 36 |
| 1970 | 3 | Pénzügyőr SE | 2 / 16 | 20 |
| 1970–71 | 3 | Pénzügyőr SE | 1 / 16 | 42 |
| 1971–72 | 2 | Pénzügyőr SE | 13 / 18 | 30 |
| 1972–73 | 2 | Pénzügyőr SE | 11 / 18 | 32 |
| 1973–74 | 2 | Pénzügyőr | 17 / 18 | 29 |
| 1974–75 | 3 | Pénzügyőr SE | 7 / 20 | 42 |
| 1975–76 | 3 | Pénzügyőr SE | 4 / 20 | 44 |
| 1976–77 | 3 | Pénzügyőr SE | 7 / 20 | 44 |
| 1977–78 | 3 | Pénzügyőr SE | 5 / 20 | 47 |
| 1978–79 | 2 | Pénzügyőr SE | 14 / 19 | 32 |
| 1979–80 | 2 | Pénzügyőr SE | 17 / 20 | 31 |
| 1980–81 | 2 | Pénzügyőr SE | 8 / 20 | 41 |
| 1981–82 | 2 | Pénzügyőr SE | 11 / 16 | 26 |
| 1982–83 | 3 | Pénzügyőr SE | 11 / 18 | 29 |
| 1983–84 | 3 | Pénzügyőr SE | 10 / 18 | 37 |
| 1984–85 | 3 | Pénzügyőr SE | 8 / 18 | 37 |
| 1985–86 | 3 | Pénzügyőr SE | 13 / 18 | 31 |
| 1986–87 | 3 | Pénzügyőr SE | 10 / 18 | 33 |
| 1987–88 | 3 | Pénzügyőr SE | 9 / 18 | 31 |
| 1988–89 | 3 | Pénzügyőr SE | 3 / 16 | 57 |
| 1989–90 | 3 | Pénzügyőr SE | 6 / 16 | 51 |
| 1990–91 | 3 | Pénzügyőr SE | 2 / 16 | 42 |
| 1991–92 | 3 | Pénzügyőr SE | 1 / 16 | 43 |
| 1992–93 | 2 | Pénzügyőr SE | 13 / 16 | 24 |
| 1993–94 | 2 | Pénzügyőr SE | 15 / 16 | 20 |
| 1994–95 | 3 | Pénzügyőr SE | 3 / 16 | 58 |
| 1995–96 | 3 | Pénzügyőr SE | 9 / 16 | 39 |
| 1996–97 | 3 | Pénzügyőr SE | 6 / 16 | 52 |
| 1997–98 | 4 | Pénzügyőr | 2 / 16 | 65 |
| 1998–99 | 4 | Pénzügyőr SE | 8 / 16 | 44 |
| 1999–00 | 4 | Pénzügyőr | 4 / 16 | 50 |
| 2000 | 3 | Pénzügyőr SE | 5 / 8 | 21 |
| 2000–01 | 4 | Pénzügyör SE | 1 / 10 | 47 |
| 2001–02 | 3 | Pénzügyőr SE | 12 / 13 | 17 |
| 2002–03 | 3 | Pénzügyőr SE | 12 / 12 | 23 |
| 2002–03 | 3 | Pénzügyőr SE | 12 / 12 | 14 |
| 2003–04 | 3 | Pénzügyőr SE | 15 / 16 | 22 |
| 2004–05 | 3 | Pénzügyőr | 16 / 16 | 14 |
| 2005–06 | 3 | Pénzügyőr SE | 6 / 18 | 58 |
| 2006–07 | 3 | Pénzügyőr SE | 2 / 14 | 52 |
| 2007–08 | 3 | Pénzügyőr SE | 4 / 16 | 54 |
| 2008–09 | 3 | Pénzügyőr SE | 8 / 16 | 38 |
| 2009–10 | 3 | Pénzügyőr SE | 11 / 14 | 27 |
| 2010–11 | 3 | Pénzügyőr SE | 7 / 16 | 44 |
| 2011–12 | 3 | Pénzügyőr SE | 9 / 16 | 44 |
| 2012–13 | 3 | Pénzügyőr SE | 11 / 15 | 35 |
| 2013–14 | 4 | Pénzügyőr SE | 2 / 16 | 74 |
| 2014–15 | 4 | Pénzügyőr SE | 1 / 16 | 82 |
| 2015–16 | 3 | Pénzügyőr SE | 5 / 17 | 46 |
| 2016–17 | 3 | Pénzügyőr SE | 9 / 18 | 46 |
| 2017–18 | 3 | Pénzügyőr SE | 12 / 16 | 29 |
| 2018–19 | 3 | Pénzügyőr SE | 14 / 16 | 31 |
| 2019–20 | 4 | Pénzügyőr SE | 5 / 16 | 36 |
| 2020–21 | 4 | Pénzügyőr SE | 4 / 16 | 55 |
| 2021–22 | 4 | Pénzügyőr SE | 1 / 16 | 76 |
| 2022–23 | 3 | Pénzügyőr SE | 10 / 20 | 50 |
| 2023–24 | 3 | Pénzügyőr SE | 13 / 16 | 32 |
| 2024–25 | 3 | Pénzügyőr SE | 13 / 16 | 27 |
| 2025–26 | 3 | Pénzügyőr SE | 15 / 16 | 20 |
