= Sényő =

Coordinates: 48°00′N 21°53′E

- Interactive map of Sényő
- Country: Hungary
- County: Szabolcs-Szatmár-Bereg

Area
  - Total: 18.30 km^{2} (7.07 sq mi)

Population (2001)
  - Total: 1,399
  - Density: 76.45/km^{2} (198.0/sq mi)
- Time zone: UTC+1 (CET)
  - Summer (DST): UTC+2 (CEST)
- Postal code: 4533
- Area code: 42

Location of Szabolcs-Szatmar-Bereg county in Hungary

Sényő (Hungarian pronunciation: [ˈʃeːɲøː]) is a village in Szabolcs-Szatmár-Bereg county, in the Northern Great Plain region of eastern Hungary.

== Geography ==
It covers an area of 18.30 km^{2} (7 sq mi) and has a population of 1399 people (2001).
