= Tiszafüred VSE =

Hungarian football club

- Full name: Tiszafüred Városi Sportegyesület
- Founded: 1913
- Ground: Lipcsey Elemér Sporttelep
- Manager: Zoltán Dorcsák
- League: NB III; Northeast
- 2023–24: NB III; Northeast, 10th of 16
- Website: https://tiszafuredivse.hu/
Home colours

Tiszafüred Városi Sportegyesület is a professional football club based in Tiszafüred, Jász-Nagykun-Szolnok County, Hungary, that competes in the Nemzeti Bajnokság III – Northeast, the third tier of Hungarian football.

== History ==
Tiszafüred won the Tisza group of the 1995–96 Nemzeti Bajnokság III season and gained promotion to the second division. However, the club spent only one season in the second division after finishing in the 14th position of the 1996–97 Nemzeti Bajnokság II season.

Tiszafüred VSE is going to compete in the 2017–18 Nemzeti Bajnokság III.

Tiszafüred played with Ferencváros in the 2024–25 Magyar Kupa season. Before the match László Mácsai, captain of the team, said that with a strong defense they can make the match difficult for Ferencváros.

On 31 October 2024, Tiszafüred were defeated 2–1 by Ferencvárosi TC in the fourth round of the 2024–25 Magyar Kupa season. After the match, Pascal Jansen, the manager Ferencváros said that the only positive thing was that Ferencváros qualified for the next round.

== Name changes ==
- Tiszafüredi TC: ? – ?
- Tiszafüredi CIKTA: ? – ?
- Tiszafüredi Barátság SE: 1946 – 1947
- Tiszafüredi DSE: 1947 – 1951
- Tiszafüredi Petőfi SK: 1951 – ?
- Tiszafüredi Bástya SK: ? – 1957?
- Tiszafüredi Petőfi SK: 1957? -?
- Tiszafüredi Spartacus: ? – ?
- Tiszafüredi Vasas Szövetkezeti SE: ? – ?
- Tiszafüredi VSE Ivecosped City Gas: ? – ?
- Tiszafüredi Városi Sportegyesület ? - 2022
- Facultas Tiszafüredi VSE 2022 -

== Honours ==
- Nemzeti Bajnokság III:
  - Winner (1): 1995–96
- Jász-Nagykun-Szolnok:
  - Winner (1): 2016–17

== Seasons ==
The table below shows the seasons of Tiszafüredi VSE.

Season	Tier	Club's name	Position	Pts
1935–36	3	Tiszafüredi TC	6 / 9	11
1942–43	4	Tiszafüredi CIKTA	8 / 8	1
1946–47	4	Tiszafüredi Barátság SE	4 / 12	23
1947–48	4	Tiszafüredi DSE	8 / 12	19
1948–49	4	Tiszafüredi DSE	10 / 16	27
1949–50	4	Tiszafüredi DSE	6 / 16	30
1950	4	Tiszafüredi DSE	9 / 14	13
1951	3	Tiszafüredi Petőfi	12 / 14	20
1952	3	Tiszafüredi Petőfi	12 / 14	15
1953	3	Tiszafüredi Petőfi	14 / 16	14
1954	4	Tiszafüredi Petőfi SK	7 / 14	29
1955	4	Tiszafüredi Bástya	4 / 14	30
1956	4	Tiszafüredi Bástya	3 / 12	22
1957	4	Tiszafüredi Bástya SK	0 / 7	
1957–58	4	Tiszafüred	14 / 16	22
1958–59	4	Tiszafüredi Petőfi	14 / 16	21
1959–60	5	Tiszafüredi Petőfi	2 / 14	25
1960–61	4	Tiszafüredi Petőfi	14 / 16	22
1961–62	4	Tiszafüredi Petőfi SK	15 / 16	20
1962–63	4	Tiszafüred	17 / 18	3
1964	6	Tiszafüred	7 / 15	25
1965	6	Tiszafüred	4 / 15	34
1966	6	Tiszafüred	6 / 15	29
1967	6	Tiszafüred	14 / 18	26
1968	7	Tiszafüredi Spartacus	1 / 13	39
1969	7	Tiszafüredi Spartacus	0 / 14	
1970	6	Tiszafüred	13 / 14	7
1970–71	6	Tiszafüredi Spartacus	8 / 14	26
1971–72	6	Tiszafüred	4 / 12	28
1972–73	6	Tiszafüred	5 / 15	32
1973–74	6	Tiszafüred	5 / 16	36
1974–75	5	Tiszafüred	7 / 16	30
1975–76	5	Tiszafüred	9 / 16	27
1976–77	5	Tiszafüred	1 / 12	38
1977–78	4	Tiszafüred	17 / 18	18
1978–79	4	Tiszafüred	2 / 13	38
1979–80	4	Tiszafüred	1 / 13	45
1980–81	3	Tiszafüredi VSZSE	16 / 18	25
1981–82	4	Tiszafüredi Vasas Szövetkezeti SE	10 / 18	34
1982–83	4	Tiszafüred	4 / 18	42
1983–84	4	Tiszafüred	8 / 18	39
1984–85	4	Tiszafüred	9 / 18	37
1985–86	4	Tiszafüred	15 / 18	27
1986–87	5	Tiszafüred	1 / 16	46
1987–88	4	Tiszafüred	2 / 16	40
1988–89	4	Tiszafüred	3 / 16	38
1989–90	4	Tiszafüred	4 / 16	49
1990–91	4	Tiszafüred	14 / 16	23
1991–92	4	Tiszafüred	6 / 16	33
1992–93	4	Tiszafüred	1 / 16	52
1993–94	3	Tiszafüred Városi SE	7 / 16	31
1994–95	3	Tiszafüred Ivecospeed VSE	4 / 16	45
1995–96	3	Tiszafüred Ivecosped VSE	1 / 16	69
1996–97	2	Tiszafüredi VSE-CityGas	14 / 16	22
1997–98	3	Tiszafüredi VSE	15 / 16	24
1998–99	4	Tiszafüredi VSE-City Gas	14 / 16	27
1999–00	4	Tiszafüred	16 / 16	16
2000–01	5	Tiszafüred	7 / 16	42
2001–02	5	Tiszafüred	2 / 16	67
2002–03	5	Tiszafüredi VSE	2 / 16	57
2003–04	5	Tiszafüred	4 / 16	49
2004–05	5	Tiszafüred	11 / 15	34
2005–06	4	Tiszafüred	10 / 16	38
2006–07	4	Tiszafüredi VSE	1 / 16	71
2007–08	3	Tiszafüredi VSE	9 / 16	38
2008–09	3	Tiszafüredi VSE	15 / 16	26
2009–10	4	Tiszafüredi VSE	5 / 18	60
2010–11	4	Tiszafüredi VSE	8 / 16	44
2011–12	4	Tiszafüred VSE	2 / 16	62
2012–13	4	Tiszafüred VSE	1 / 16	66
2013–14	4	Tiszafüred VSE	3 / 16	66
2014–15	4	Tiszafüred VSE	1 / 16	82
2015–16	4	Tiszafüred VSE	1 / 16	62
2016–17	4	Tiszafüred VSE	1 / 16	72
2017–18	3	Tiszafüred VSE	15 / 16	24
2018–19	4	Tiszafüred VSE	1 / 16	81
2019–20	4	Tiszafüred VSE	1 / 15	46
2020–21	3	Tiszafüred VSE	11 / 20	48
2021–22	3	Tiszafüred VSE	13 / 20	47
2022–23	3	Facultas-Tiszafüredi VSE	16 / 20	46
2023–24	3	Facultas-Tiszafüredi VSE	10 / 16	38
2024–25	3	Facultas-Tiszafüredi VSE	4 / 16	50
2025–26	3	Tiszafüredi VSE	4 / 16	56
