= Cigánd =

- Town
- Flag Coat of arms

- Location of Cigánd in Borsod-Abaúj-Zemplén County Location of Cigánd in Hungary
- Coordinates: 48.26328°N 21.89185°E
- Country: Hungary
- Regions: Northern Hungary
- County: Borsod-Abaúj-Zemplén
- District: Cigánd

Area
  - Total: 56.79 km^{2} (21.93 sq mi)

Population (2015)
  - Total: 3,044
  - Density: 53.60/km^{2} (138.8/sq mi)
- Time zone: UTC+1 (CET)
  - Summer (DST): UTC+2 (CEST)
- Postal code: 3973
- Area code: (+36) 47
- Website: cigand.hu

Cigánd is a very small town in Borsod–Abaúj–Zemplén County, Northern Hungary, 80 kilometres (50 miles) from the county capital Miskolc.

== History ==
The area has been inhabited since ancient times. Before the Hungarians conquered the area, Slavic and Avar tribes lived here.

Cigánd was first mentioned in documents in 1289. Its residents were fishers, hunters and serfs. In 1347 the village was divided into two parts because of a debate over ownership, the two parts were called Small Cigánd and Greater Cigánd. The two parts were reunited in 1922.

After the regulation of the Tisza river, the village got arable land, and from this time the residents grew potatoes.

Cigánd was granted town status on 1 July 2004.

== International relations ==
=== Twin towns – Sister cities ===
Cigánd is twinned with:

- Aluniș, Romania
- Biel, Slovakia
- Sobrance, Slovakia
