= Monori SE =

Hungarian football club

- Full name: Monori Sportegyesület
- Founded: 1901; 125 years ago
- Ground: Balassi Bálint utcai stadion
- Capacity: 2,250
- Chairman: Tamás Zátrok
- Manager: István Halgas
- League: NB II
- 2025–26: NB III; Southeast, 1st of 16 (Promoted)
- Website: monorse.hu
Home colours

Monori Sportegyesület is a professional football club based in Monor, Pest County, Hungary, that competes in the Nemzeti Bajnokság II, the third tier of Hungarian football.

== Name changes ==
- 1901–1906: Monor Sport Club
- 1906–?: Monor Sportegyesület
- ?–1940: Monor Sport Egylet
- 1940–1944: Monori MOVE TSE
- 1945–1947: Monori Munkás SE
- 1947–1951: Monori SzSE
- 1948: merger with Monori Barátság
- 1951–1953: Monori Építők
- 1953–1955: Monori Vörös Meteor
- 1991: merger with Dány
- ?–1998: Monor-Ecker SE
- 1998–2001: Monor-Ilzer SE
- 2001–2002: Monor Sáma SE
- 2002–present: Monori Sportegyesület

== Honours ==
- Nemzeti Bajnokság III:
  - Winners (1): 2025–26

== Seasons ==
The table below shows the seasons of Monori SE.

Season	Tier	Club's name	Position	Pts
1907–08	2	Monori SE	2 / 3	5
1909–10	2	Monori SE	3 / 3	0
1910–11	2	Monori SE	2 / 3	4
1911–12	2	Monori SE	1 / 5	10
1912–13	2	Monori SE	2 / 6	
1913–14	2	Monori SE	4 / 7	8
1917–18	2	Monori SE	5 / 10	
1918–19	2	Monori SE	0 / 4	
1919–20	2	Monori SE	1 / 7	
1919–20	2	Monori SE	2 / 4	
1920–21	2	Monori SE	1 / 7	
1921–22	2	Monori SE	0 / 9	
1922–23	2	Monori SE	5 / 10	15
1923–24	2	Monori SE	7 / 8	7
1924–25	2	Monori SE	2 / 8	14
1925–26	2	Monori SE	8 / 8	4
1926–27	2	Monori SE	8 / 9	7
1927–28	3	Monori SE	4 / 9	8
1928–29	3	Monori SE	1 / 9	25
1929–30	2	Monori SE	2 / 8	16
1930–31	2	Monori SE	3 / 8	14
1931–32	2	Monori SE	9 / 10	3
1932–33	3	Monori SE	4 / 13	
1933–34	3	Monori SE	2 / 12	
1934–35	3	Monori SE	3 / 12	34
1935–36	3	Monori SE	2 / 11	29
1936–37	3	Monori SE	2 / 10	27
1937–38	2	Monori SE	6 / 12	24
1938–39	3	Monori SE	10 / 12	13
1939–40	3	Monori SE	10 / 12	9
1940–41	4	Monori MOVE TSE	7 / 14	26
1941–42	4	Monori MOVE TSE	4 / 13	32
1942–43	3	Monori MOVE	9 / 14	24
1943–44	4	Monori MOVE TSE	7 / 14	24
1943–44	3	Monori MOVE TSE	10 / 15	27
1944–45	2	MOVE Monor	8 / 16	8
1944–45	3	MOVE Monori TSE	0 / 13	
1945	2	Monori Munkás SE	0 / 8	
1945–46	2	Monori Munkás SE	4 / 12	21
1946–47	3	Monori MSE	5 / 16	22
1947–48	3	Monori SE	6 / 16	30
1948–49	3	Monori SE	14 / 16	24
1949–50	3	Monori SzSE	12 / 16	27
1950	3	Monori SzSE	14 / 16	9
1951	3	Monori Építők	3 / 14	33
1952	3	Monori Építők	6 / 14	27
1953	3	Monori Vörös Meteor	3 / 16	36
1954	3	Monori Vörös Meteor	8 / 16	30
1957	4	Monor	3 / 10	26
1957–58	4	Monori Petőfi	3 / 16	38
1958–59	4	Monori KSK	8 / 16	30
1959–60	4	Monori KSK	7 / 16	30
1960–61	4	Monori SE	7 / 18	37
1961–62	4	Monori SE	9 / 17	30
1962–63	4	Monor	6 / 16	31
1963	5	Monori SE	8 / 16	15
1964	5	Monor	3 / 16	36
1965	5	Monor	12 / 16	26
1966	5	Monor	5 / 16	34
1967	5	Monor	11 / 16	27
1968	5	Monor	14 / 16	18
1969	6	Monor	11 / 16	29
1970	6	Monor	6 / 8	10
1970–71	6	Monor	5 / 15	29
1971–72	6	Monor	1 / 16	44
1972–73	5	Monori SE	3 / 16	36
1973–74	5	Monori SE	7 / 16	33
1974–75	4	Monori SE	8 / 16	30
1975–76	4	Monori SE	15 / 16	14
1976–77	4	Monori SE	14 / 16	20
1977–78	5	Monor	5 / 9	22
1978–79	4	Monor	8 / 14	25
1979–80	4	Monor	6 / 16	39
1980–81	4	Monor	4 / 16	41
1981–82	5	Monor	11 / 14	17
1982–83	6	Monor	2 / 14	43
1983–84	6	Monor	1 / 14	41
1984–85	5	Monor	7 / 14	27
1985–86	5	Monor	9 / 14	27
1986–87	5	Monori SE	5 / 14	28
1987–88	5	Monori SE	11 / 14	19
1988–89	5	Monori SE	12 / 14	18
1989–90	5	Monori SE	11 / 14	19
1990–91	5	Monor SE	3 / 16	41
1991–92	3	Monori SE	9 / 16	23
1992–93	3	Monori SE	9 / 16	30
1993–94	3	Monori SE	9 / 16	28
1994–95	3	Monori SE	8 / 16	46
1995–96	3	Monor-Ecker SE	7 / 16	45
1996–97	3	Monor-Ecker Likőrgyár	8 / 16	41
1997–98	4	Monor-Ecker	5 / 16	52
1998–99	4	Monor-Ilzer SE	2 / 16	65
1999–00	3	Monor-Ilzer	9 / 16	40
2000	2	Monor-Ilzer	3 / 7	16
2000–01	2	Monor-Ilzer SE	9 / 12	26
2001–02	2	Monor-Sáma SE	11 / 12	32
2001–02	2	Monor SE	11 / 12	21
2002–03	2	Monor-Sáma	18 / 20	8
2003–04	4	Monor SE	3 / 16	65
2004–05	4	Monor	1 / 14	59
2005–06	3	Monori SE	5 / 15	46
2006–07	3	Monori SE	4 / 14	46
2007–08	3	Monori SE	4 / 16	54
2008–09	3	Monor SE	12 / 16	34
2009–10	3	Monor SE	8 / 14	30
2010–11	3	Monori SE	10 / 16	36
2011–12	3	Monor SE	9 / 16	39
2012–13	3	Monori SE	2 / 14	50
2013–14	3	Monori SE	13 / 16	29
2014–15	3	Monori SE	6 / 16	48
2015–16	3	Monori SE	12 / 17	39
2016–17	3	Monori SE	2 / 18	66
2017–18	3	Monori SE	1 / 16	76
2018–19	2	BSS Monor	20 / 20	30
2019–20	3	Monori SE	3 / 16	38
2020–21	3	Monori SE	8 / 20	56
2021–22	3	Monori SE	8 / 20	61
2022–23	3	Monori SE	10 / 20	45
2023–24	3	Monori SE	8 / 16	39
2024–25	3	Monori SE	3 / 16	64
2025–26	3	Monori SE	1 / 16	67
