= Szekszárdi UFC =

Hungarian football club

- Full name: Szekszárdi Utánpótlásnevelő Football Club
- Founded: 1992; 33 years ago
- Ground: Szekszárdi Városi Stadion
- Capacity: 8,000
- Chairman: Zoltán Kárpáti
- Manager: István Mészáros
- League: NB III; Southwest
- 2023–24: NB III; Southwest, 12th of 16
- Website: https://szufc.hu/
Home colours

Szekszárdi Utánpótlásnevelő Football Club is a professional football club based in Szekszárd, Tolna county, Hungary, that competes in the Nemzeti Bajnokság III – Southwest, the third tier of Hungarian football.

== Name changes ==
- 1993–1994: Szekszárdi Polgári SE
- 1994–1998: Utánpótlás FC Szekszárd
- 1998–1999: Jerking Szekszárd UFC
- 1999–2009: Szekszárdi Utánpótlásnevelő Football Club
- 2009–present: Tolle Utánpótlásnevelő Football Club Szekszárd

== Honours ==
=== County Leagues (Dráva / Tolna) ===
- Megyei Bajnokság I (level 4)
  - Winners (2): 2001–02, 2006–07
