= FC Dabas =

Hungarian football club

Meton-FC Dabas Se
- Full name: Meton-Football Club Dabas
- Founded: 1950; 76 years ago
- Ground: Wellis Sportpark
- Capacity: 2,500
- Manager: László Tóth
- League: NB III; Southeast
- 2023–24: NB III; Southeast, 9th of 16
- Website: fcdabas.hu
Home colours

Football Club Dabas is a professional football club based in Dabas, Pest County, Hungary, that competes in the Nemzeti Bajnokság III, the third tier of Hungarian football.

== Name changes ==
- ?–50: Alsódabasi EPOSz
- 1997–2000: Dabas VSE
- 2000–2002: Diego-FC Dabas
- 2000: purchased the right from Érdi VSE
- 2002–2022: Football Club Dabas
- 2022–present: Meton-FC Dabas Se

== Honours ==
- Nemzeti Bajnokság III:
  - Winners (1): 2002–03
