= Balatonlelle SE =

Hungarian football club

- Full name: Balatonlelle Sportegyesület
- Founded: 1924; 102 years ago
- Ground: Balatonlellei Sporttelep
Home colours	Away colours

Balatonlelle Sportegyesület is a professional football club based in Balatonlelle, Somogy County, Hungary, that competes in the Somogy county league.

== Name changes ==
- 1924–?: Balatonlelle
- ?-1948: Balatonlellei Barátság
- 1948–?: Balatonlelle
- 1950–1974: Balatonlellei Vörös Meteor
- 1974–1975: Balatonlellei Községi Sportkör
- 1975–1979: Balatonlellei Spartacus
- 1979: merger with Balatonboglár
- 1979–1992: Boglárlelle SE
- 1992–present: Balatonlelle Sportegyesület

== Honours ==
- Somogy megyei I
  - Winners (4): 1984–85, 1993–94, 2009–10, 2018–19
- Szabad Föld kupa:
  - Runners-up (1): 1988
- Errea Kupa győztes:
  - Winners (1): 2009–10
- Dél-Dunántúli Regionális Kupa
  - Winners (1): 2009–10

== Seasons ==
As of 18 October 2026.

Season	Tier	Club's name	Position	Pts
1947/1948	5	Balatonlellei Barátság	5 / 16	36
1948/1949	4	Balatonlelle	9 / 16	31
1949/1950	4	Balatonlelle	9 / 16	21
1950	4	Balatonlelle	12 / 14	9
1951	4	Balatonlellei Vörös Meteor	1 / 12	
1952	3	Balatonlellei Vörös Meteor	14 / 14	12
1953	3	Balatonlellei Vörös Meteor	11 / 12	15
1954	4	Balatonlelle	2 / 12	31
1955	4	Balatonlellei Vörös Meteor	1 / 10	31
1956	3	Balatonlelle	14 / 14	12
1957	3	Balatonlellei Vörös Meteor	6 / 7	7
1957/1958	4	Balatonlellei Vörös Meteor SK	10 / 16	29
1958/1959	4	Balatonlelle	9 / 16	27
1959/1960	4	Balatonlellei Vörös Meteor	9 / 16	27
1960/1961	4	Balatonlelle	12 / 16	26
1961/1962	4	Balatonlelle	13 / 18	28
1962/1963	4	Balatonlelle	13 / 16	17
1963	5	Balatonlellei Vörös Meteor	8 / 9	7
1964	5	Balatonlellei Vörös Meteor	16 / 16	13
1965	6	Balatonlelle	9 / 14	19
1966	6	Balatonlelle	7 / 16	29
1967	6	Balatonlelle	5 / 16	37
1968	6	Balatonlelle	6 / 12	21
1969	6	Balatonlelle	9 / 12	15
1970	6	Balatonlelle	8 / 8	8
1970/1971	6	Balatonlelle	8 / 15	25
1971/1972	6	Balatonlelle	5 / 16	32
1972/1973	6	Balatonlelle	6 / 15	28
1973/1974	6	Balatonlelle	1 / 14	38
1974/1975	4	Balatonlelle	5 / 16	34
1975/1976	4	Balatonlelle	6 / 16	37
1976/1977	4	Balatonlelle	5 / 16	35
1977/1978	4	Balatonlellei Spartacus SE	6 / 18	36
1978/1979	3	Balatonlellei Spartacus	3 / 18	49
1979/1980	3	Boglárlelle	4 / 16	37
1980/1981	3	Boglárlellei SE	6 / 16	38
1981/1982	4	Boglárlellei SE	2 / 16	40
1982/1983	4	Boglárlelle SE	1 / 16	44
1983/1984	3	Boglárlellei SE	14 / 16	23
1984/1985	4	Boglárlellei SE	1 / 16	55
1985/1986	3	Boglárlellei SE	15 / 16	22
1986/1987	4	Boglárlellei SE	5 / 16	35
1987/1988	4	Boglárlellei SE	1 / 16	45
1988/1989	3	Boglárlelle SE	13 / 16	34
1989/1990	3	Boglárlellei SE	5 / 16	45
1990/1991	3	Boglárlelle	12 / 16	23
1991/1992	3	Balatonlelle SE	13 / 16	25
1992/1993	3	Balatonlellei SE	16 / 16	16
1993/1994	4	Balatonlelle SE	1 / 16	44
1994/1995	3	Balatonlellei SE	12 / 16	30
1995/1996	3	Balatonlelle	9 / 16	39
1996/1997	3	Balatonlelle	5 / 16	50
1997/1998	4	Balatonlelle	3 / 16	62
1998/1999	4	Balatonlelle SE	1 / 16	74
1999/2000	3	Balatonlelle SE	10 / 16	34
2000	3	Balatonlelle SE	1 / 8	36
2000/2001	3	Balatonlelle SE	5 / 12	34
2001/2002	3	Balatonlelle SE	6 / 13	36
2002/2003	3	Balatonlelle SE	3 / 12	48
2002/2003	3	Balatonlelle SE	1 / 12	40
2003/2004	3	Balatonlelle SE	10 / 16	34
2004/2005	3	Balatonlelle	8 / 16	44
2005/2006	2	Balatonlelle SE	11 / 16	33
2006/2007	2	Balatonlelle SE	16 / 16	11
2007/2008	3	Balatonlelle SE	2 / 18	66
2008/2009	3	Balatonlelle SE	15 / 16	24
2009/2010	4	Balatonlelle SE	1 / 16	75
2010/2011	3	Balatonlelle SE	4 / 16	50
2011/2012	3	Balatonlelle SE	11 / 15	31
2012/2013	3	Balatonlelle SE	13 / 14	15
2013/2014	4	Balatonlelle SE	3 / 16	58
2014/2015	4	Balatonlelle SE	1 / 16	80
2015/2016	4	Balatonlelle SE	5 / 18	62
2016/2017	4	Balatonlelle SE	1 / 16	76
2017/2018	4	Balatonlelle SE	2 / 16	73
2018/2019	4	Balatonlelle SE	1 / 16	83
2019/2020	3	Greenplan-Balatonlelle SE	16 / 16	10
2020/2021	4	Balatonlelle SE	1 / 14	63
2021/2022	4	Balatonlelle SE	1 / 13	58
2022/2023	4	Balatonlelle SE	6 / 15	46
2023/2024	4	Balatonlelle SE	4 / 16	64
2024/2025	4	Balatonlelle SE	1 / 15	71
2025/2026	3	Greenplan-Balatonlelle SE	14 / 16	24
