= FC Veszprém =

Hungarian football club

Veszprém FC
- Full name: Veszprémi Football Club
- Founded: 7 January 1912; 114 years ago
- Ground: Egyetemi Stadion, Veszprém
- Capacity: 5,000
- Chairman: Szabó Péter
- Head Coach: Tamás Pető
- League: NB III
- 2022–23: NB III, West, 1st of 20 (promotion play-offs)

Veszprém FC is a Hungarian association football club, founded in 1912 as Vegyész TC. The club played in the Hungarian First League between 1988 and 1993. In 2005, the club disbanded but was re-organized in 2006.

== History ==
Veszprém FC was established in 1969.

Between 1988 and 1993, Veszprém competed in the first division, Nemzeti Bajnokság I.

== Name changes ==
- Bakony Vegyész TC: 1969 - 1985
- Veszprémi SE: 1985 - 1990
- Veszprémi Futball Club: 1990 - 1992
- Veszprém LC: 1992 - 1993
- Veszprém FC: 1993 - 1996
- Jutas Veszprém FK: 1996 - 1998
- Veszprém LC 2000: 1998
- Veszprém LC 2001: 1999 - 2003
- Veszprém FC-Legea: 2003 - 2005
- Veszprém FC: 2007 - 2015
- Veszprémi Labdarúgó és Sportszervező Kft.: 2015 - 2020
- Practical-VLS Veszprém: 2020 - 2023
- Practical Veszprémi Sport Club: 2023 - 2025
- VSC Veszprém: 2025 -

== Honours ==
- Nemzeti Bajnokság II:
  - Winners (1): 1987–88
- Nemzeti Bajnokság III:
  - Winners (3): 1982–83, 2009–10, 2022–23

== Seasons ==
The table below shows the seasons of Veszprém FC.

Season	Tier	Club's name	Position	Pts
1970	3	Bakony Vegyész TC	3 / 16	20
1970–71	3	Bakony Vegyész TC	9 / 16	31
1971–72	3	Bakony Vegyész TC	7 / 16	30
1972–73	3	Bakony Vegyész TC	8 / 16	29
1973–74	3	Bakony Vegyész TC	9 / 16	29
1974–75	3	Bakony Vegyész	13 / 20	34
1975–76	3	Bakony Vegyész TC	7 / 19	38
1976–77	3	Bakony Vegyész TC	15 / 20	33
1977–78	3	Bakony Vegyész	12 / 20	40
1978–79	2	Bakony Vegyész	16 / 20	34
1979–80	2	Bakony Vegyész TC	13 / 20	33
1980–81	2	Bakony Vegyész TC	13 / 20	36
1981–82	2	Bakony Vegyész TC	14 / 16	18
1982–83	3	Bakony Vegyész TC	1 / 18	58
1983–84	2	Bakony Vegyész TC	6 / 20	40
1984–85	2	Bakony Vegyész	17 / 20	31
1985–86	2	Veszprémi SE	16 / 20	35
1986–87	2	Veszprémi SE	9 / 20	38
1987–88	2	Veszprém SE	1 / 20	49
1988–89	1	Veszprémi SE	10 / 16	41
1989–90	1	Veszprémi SE	6 / 16	41
1990–91	1	Veszprémi FC	5 / 16	34
1991–92	1	Veszprémi FC	12 / 16	24
1992–93	1	Veszprém LC	16 / 16	18
1993–94	2	Veszprémi FC	12 / 16	26
1994–95	2	Veszprém FC	5 / 16	49
1995–96	2	Veszprém FC	13 / 16	28
1996–97	2	Jutas Veszprém HFK	14 / 16	18
1997–98	3	Jutas Veszprém	16 / 16	11
1998–99	3	Veszprém LC 2000	15 / 16	24
1999–00	3	Veszprém LC	2 / 16	50
2000	2	Veszprém LC	7 / 7	7
2000–01	3	Veszprém LC	4 / 12	35
2001–02	3	Veszprém LC	8 / 13	29
2002–03	3	Veszprém LC	7 / 12	34
2002–03	3	Veszprém LC	8 / 12	51
2003–04	3	Veszprém LC	4 / 16	53
2004–05	3	Veszprém	10 / 16	42
2006–07	5	Veszprém FC	1 / 13	65
2007–08	3	Veszprém FC	11 / 18	47
2008–09	3	Veszprém FC	2 / 16	72
2009–10	3	Veszprém FC	1 / 14	68
2010–11	2	Veszprém FC	14 / 16	30
2011–12	2	Veszprém FC	6 / 16	47
2012–13	2	Veszprém FC	11 / 16	36
2013–14	3	Veszprém FC	13 / 16	28
2014–15	3	Veszprém FC	0 / 16	
2015–16	4	Veszprém LS	1 / 18	97
2016–17	3	VLS Veszprém	11 / 18	40
2017–18	3	VLS Veszprém	16 / 16	22
2018–19	4	VLS Veszprém	1 / 16	81
2019–20	3	VLS Veszprém	9 / 16	25
2020–21	3	Practical-VLS Veszprém	3 / 20	70
2021–22	3	Practical-VLS Veszprém	3 / 20	80
2022–23	3	Practical-VLS Veszprém	1 / 20	92
2023–24	3	Practical Veszprémi SC	3 / 16	62
2024–25	3	Practical VSC	3 / 16	57
2025–26	3	VSC 2015 Veszprém	8 / 16	44

== Managers ==
- Tamás Nagy (2013)
