= Hungarian football league system =

The Hungarian football league system is a series of connected leagues for club football in Hungary. This system has hierarchical format with promotion and relegation between leagues at different levels.

== History ==
The governing body of football in Hungary, the Hungarian Football Federation, was founded in 1901. The five founding clubs were Budapesti TC, Magyar Úszó Egylet, Ferencvárosi TC, Műegyetemi AFC, and Budapesti SC.

== Structure ==
Level	Leagues			
	Professional football			
1	NB I (Fizz Liga) 12 teams ↓ 2 relegation spots			
2	NB II (Merkantil Bank Liga) 16 teams ↑2 promotion spots ↓ 2 relegation spots			
	Amateur football (nationwide)			
3
3	NB III; 64 clubs into 4 groups ↑ 2 promotion spots (via Promotion Play-offs) ↓ 3 lowest teams of each group and two worst 13th place teams relegated			
3	Northwest group 16 teams	Northeast group 16 teams	Southwest group 16 teams	Southeast group 16 teams
	Amateur football (regional)			
4	Vármegye I (First tier of local divisions) Bács-Kiskun vármegyei labdarúgó első osztály – 16 teams Baranya vármegyei labdarúgó első osztály – 14 teams Békés vármegyei labdarúgó első osztály – 16 teams Borsod-Abaúj-Zemplén vármegyei labdarúgó első osztály – 18 teams Budapesti labdarúgó első osztály – 18 teams Csongrád-Csanád vármegyei labdarúgó első osztály – 16 teams Fejér vármegyei labdarúgó első osztály – 16 teams Győr-Moson-Sopron vármegyei labdarúgó első osztály – 16 teams Hajdú-Bihar vármegyei labdarúgó első osztály – 18 teams Heves vármegyei labdarúgó első osztály – 16 teams Jász-Nagykun-Szolnok vármegyei labdarúgó első osztály – 18 teams Komárom-Esztergom vármegyei labdarúgó első osztály – 16 teams Nógrád vármegyei labdarúgó első osztály – (Nyugati-, Keleti group) 11+12 teams Pest vármegyei labdarúgó első osztály – 16 teams Somogy vármegyei labdarúgó első osztály – 16 teams Szabolcs-Szatmár-Bereg vármegyei labdarúgó első osztály – 16 teams Tolna vármegyei labdarúgó első osztály – 16 teams Vas vármegyei labdarúgó első osztály – 16 teams Veszprém vármegyei labdarúgó első osztály – 16 teams Zala vármegyei labdarúgó első osztály – 16 teams (20 leagues)			
5	Vármegye II (Second tier of local divisions) Bács-Kiskun vármegyei labdarúgó másodosztály – (Északi-, Déli group) 16+16 teams Baranya vármegyei labdarúgó másodosztály (Vármegye I/B) – 17 teams Békés vármegyei labdarúgó másodosztály – 16 teams Borsod-Abaúj-Zemplén vármegyei labdarúgó másodosztály – (Északi-, Keleti-, Közép group) 16+16+16 teams Budapesti labdarúgó másodosztály (Vármegye I/B) – 16 teams Csongrád-Csanád vármegyei labdarúgó másodosztály – 14 teams Fejér vármegyei labdarúgó másodosztály – (Atlantic-, Femol group) 16+16 teams Győr-Moson-Sopron vármegyei labdarúgó másodosztály – (Győri-, Soproni-, Mosonmagyaróvári- teams) 16+16+16 teams Hajdú-Bihar vármegyei Labdarúgó másodosztály – 16 teams Heves vármegyei labdarúgó másodosztály – (Nyugati-, Keleti group) 17+16 teams Jász-Nagykun-Szolnok vármegyei labdarúgó másodosztály – 18 teams Komárom-Esztergom vármegyei labdarúgó másodosztály – 15 teams Nógrád vármegyei labdarúgó másodosztály – (Déli-, Keleti-, Nyugati group) 10+14+16 teams Pest vármegyei labdarúgó másodosztály – (Ro-La Kft.-, Vabu Sport-, Vésnők Kft. group) 14+14+14 teams Somogy vármegyei labdarúgó másodosztály – (Északi-, Déli group) 16+16 teams Szabolcs-Szatmár-Bereg vármegyei labdarúgó másodosztály – (első-, második-, harmadik group) 16+16+16; Tolna vármegyei labdarúgó másodosztály – 16 teams Vas vármegyei labdarúgó másodosztály – (Szombathelyi-, Körmendi-, Sárvári group) 16+16+14 teams Veszprém vármegyei labdarúgó másodosztály – (Nyugati-, Keleti group) 14+15 teams Zala vármegyei labdarúgó másodosztály – (Északi-, Déli group) 16+16 teams (20 leagues)			
6	Vármegye III (Third tier of local divisions) Bács-Kiskun vármegyei labdarúgó harmadosztály – (Északi-, Közép-, Déli group) 16+15+15 teams Baranya vármegyei labdarúgó harmadosztály (Vármegyei II) – (Mohácsi-, Szigetvári group) 14+14 teams Békés vármegyei labdarúgó harmadosztály – (A-, B group) 15+10 teams Borsod-Abaúj-Zemplén vármegyei labdarúgó harmadosztály – (Miskolci-, Encsi-, Szerencsi-, Zemlpéni-, Kazincbarcikai-, Mezőcsáti group); Budapesti labdarúgó harmadosztály (Vármegyei II) – (első-, második group) 16 teams Csongrád-Csanád vármegyei labdarúgó harmadosztály – (Homokhéti-, Tisza-Maros group) 11+10 teams Fejér vármegyei labdarúgó harmadosztály – (Északi-, Közép-, Déli group) 13+14+13 teams Győr-Moson-Sopron vármegyei labdarúgó harmadosztály – (Győri, Kapuvári, Mosonmagyaróvári, Csornai group) 16+18+16+18 teams Hajdú-Bihar vármegyei labdarúgó harmadosztály – (Nyugati-, Keleti group) 8+8 teams Heves vármegyei labdarúgó harmadosztály – 15 teams Jász-Nagykun-Szolnok vármegyei labdarúgó harmadosztály – 16 teams Komárom-Esztergom vármegyei labdarúgó harmadosztály – (Északi-, Déli group) 11+10 teams Nógrád vármegyei labdarúgó harmadosztály – (Balassagyarmati-, Rétsági group) 13+13 teams Pest vármegyei labdarúgó harmadosztály – (Gödöllői-, Monori-, Nagykátai-, Ráckevei-, Szentendrei-, Váci group) 14+12+12+10+12+14 teams Somogy vármegyei labdarúgó harmadosztály – (Balaton-, Kapos-, Dél-Somogy group) 12+12+12 teams Szabolcs-Szatmár-Bereg vármegyei labdarúgó harmadosztály – (Nyíregyházi-, Kisvárdai-, Fehérgyarmati-, Mátészalkai-, Vásárosnaményi group) 12+12+12+14+10 teams Tolna vármegyei labdarúgó harmadosztály – (Nyugati-, Keleti group) 16+16 teams Vas vármegyei labdarúgó harmadosztály – (Szombathely/Nyugati-, Szombathely/Északi Körmendi-, Sárvári teams) 16+16+14 teams Veszprém vármegyei labdarúgó harmadosztály – 12 teams Zala vármegyei labdarúgó harmadosztály – (Északi-, Déli,- Közép,- Kelet,- Nyugat group) 15+16+16+16+14 teams (20 leagues)			
7	Vármegye IV Baranya vármegyei labdarúgó negyedosztály (Vármegye III) – (Mohácsi-, Szigetvári group) 15+16 teams Budapesti labdarúgó negyedosztály (Vármegye III) – (első-, második group) 16+16 teams Győr-Moson-Sopron vármegyei labdarúgó negyedosztály – 6 teams Somogy vármegyei labdarúgó negyedosztály – 13 teams Szabolcs-Szatmár-Bereg vármegyei labdarúgó negyedosztály – (Nyíregyházi-, Fehérgyarmati group) 16+12 teams Veszprém vármegyei labdarúgó negyedosztály – 10 teams (6 leagues)			
