= 2025–26 Magyar Kupa =

MOL Magyar Kupa
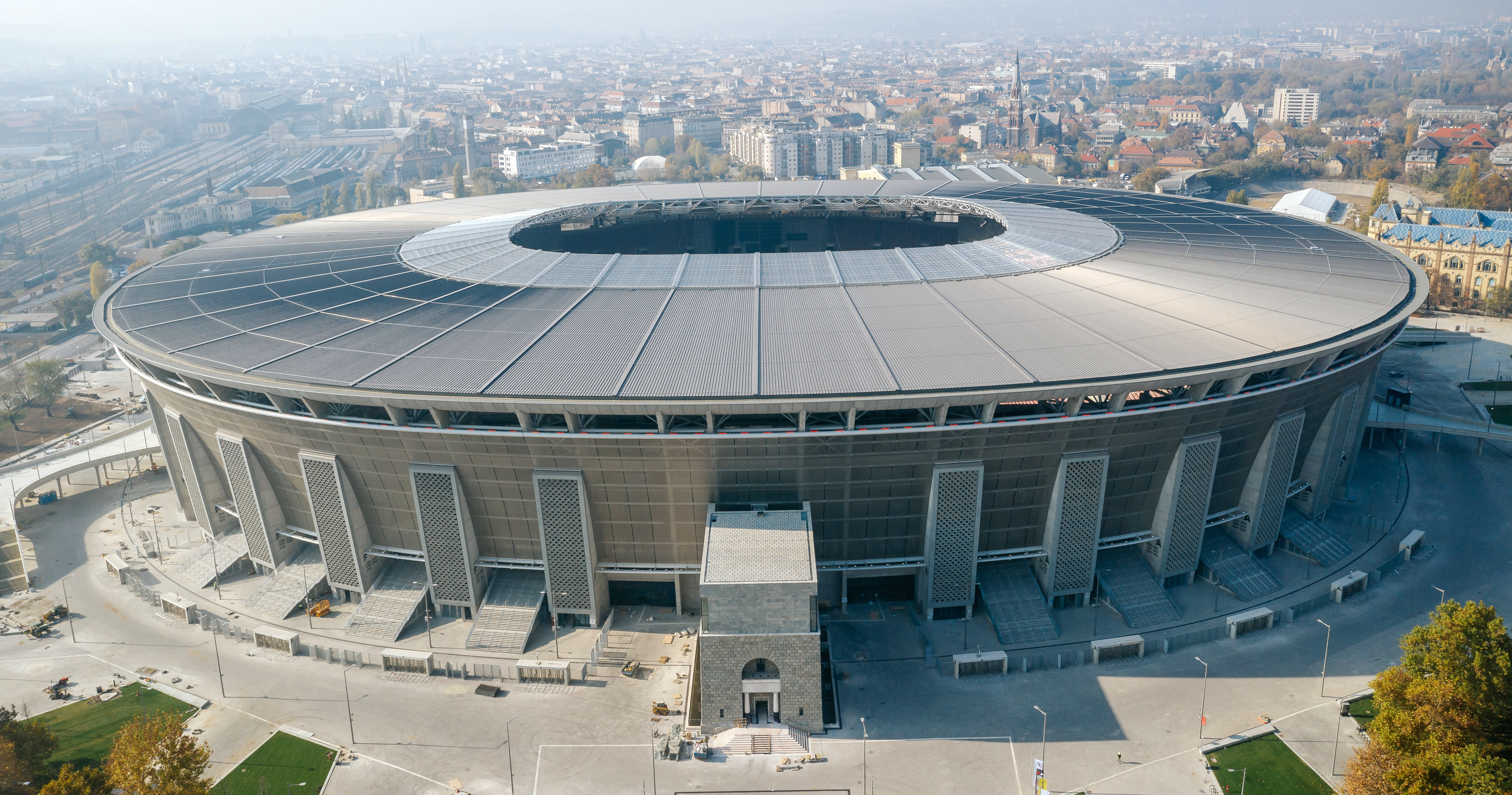
- Puskás Aréna hosted the final

Tournament details
- Country: Hungary
- Dates: 2 August 2025 – 9 May 2026

Final positions
- Champions: Ferencváros (25th title)
- Runners-up: Zalaegerszeg

Tournament statistics
- Top goal scorer: Ádám Gruber, Gergő Lénárt, Yusuf Bamidele (6 each)

The 2025–26 Magyar Kupa (lit. 'Hungarian Cup') was the 86th season of Hungary's annual knock-out cup football competition. MOL will be the sponsor of the tournament, thus the sponsored name is MOL Magyar Kupa. The winners will qualify for the 2026–27 UEFA Europa League first qualifying round.

== Competition format ==
The Magyar Kupa is played as a knockout tournament. All rounds are played as one-off matches. The final is traditionally held in the Puskás Aréna, Budapest. A significant change to this year's competition by the Hungarian Football Federation is that the final will take place on a weekend.

The competition consists of eighth proper rounds. All rounds are single-match elimination rounds. When tied after 90 minutes first an extra time period of 30 minutes will be played, then penalties are to be taken if still necessary. All rounds will be drawn randomly, usually either at the completion of the previous round discounting any replays or on the evening of the last televised game of a round being played, depending on television broadcasting rights. Another change is to this year's competition, that the automatic right of lower-class teams to choose their home team among the Round of 32 will be abolished, so in the new competition, a draw will decide the identity of the home team at this stage. The Round of 64 will continue to take place in accordance with the spirit of the cup, with the lower-class teams choosing their home team.

== Calendar ==
Round	Main date(s)	Fixtures	Clubs	New entries	Leagues entering
First round	2–3 August 2025	72	144 → 72	144	Nemzeti Bajnokság III and Local teams (MB I, MB II, MB III, MB IV)
Second round	23–24 August 2025	36	72 → 36	none	none
Round of 64 (Third round)	13–14 September 2025	32	64 → 32	28	Nemzeti Bajnokság I and Nemzeti Bajnokság II
Round of 32 (Fourth round)	28–30 October 2025	16	32 → 16	none	none
Round of 16 (Fifth round)	11–12 February 2026	8	16 → 8	none	none
Quarter-finals (Sixth round)	3–5 March 2026	4	8 → 4	none	none
Semi-finals (Seventh round)	21–22 April 2026	2	4 → 2	none	none
Final (Eighth round)	9 May 2026	1	2 → 1	none	none

== Matches ==
Times up to 25 October 2025 and from 30 March 2025 are CEST (UTC+2). Times from 26 October 2025 to 28 March 2026 are CET (UTC+1).

=== First round ===
Participating teams: Teams in Tier 3 and below entered the first round:

- 2 teams from 2024–25 Nemzeti Bajnokság II (place 15th and 16th),
- 2 teams: losing teams of the Promotion play-offs matches held between the 1st placed teams of the 4 groups of the 2024–25 Nemzeti Bajnokság III,
- 46 teams: 2nd–16th placed teams of the 4 groups of the 2024–25 Nemzeti Bajnokság III (excluding the second teams of the clubs participating in the 2024–25 Nemzeti Bajnokság I and 2024–25 Nemzeti Bajnokság II),
- 94 teams: 2024–25 Megyei Bajnokság I teams that have qualified from the County Cup.
- Total: 144 teams.

The draw for the First round was held on 11 July 2025. Competition Committee of MLSZ (Hungarian Football Federation) divided the teams that reached the first round of the Hungarian Cup into four regional pots based on their geographical location (North-East, South-East, North-West, South-West) so that amateur teams would not have to travel across the country for cup matches. A blind draw was used to decide between the four groups, as progression is still decided in one match, and the identity of the field selector was determined either by the draw or by the class difference (the one from the lower tier is the field selector). The duels are decided in one match.

Number of teams per tier entering this round
Nemzeti Bajnokság I (tier 1) (Note: Nemzeti Bajnokság I and Nemzeti Bajnokság II teams joined the competition in Round of 64.)	Nemzeti Bajnokság II (tier 2)	Nemzeti Bajnokság III (tier 3)	Megyei Bajnokság I (tier 4)	Megyei Bajnokság II (tier 5)	Total
12 / 12	16 / 16	51 / 51	83 / 83	10 / 10	172 / 172

Team 1	Score	Team 2
2 August 2025
Vecsés (4)	1 – 2	III. Kerületi TVE (3)
Dunaföldvár (4)	1 – 8	Dombóvári FC (3)
Gárdony (3)	1 – 10	PMFC (3)
Jászfényszaru (4)	0 – 5	Hatvan (3)
Bonyhád (4)	0 – 8	Dunaújváros (3)
Sajóbábony (4)	5 – 3	Csenger (4)
Hódoscsépány (5)	1 – 0	Gyulaháza (4)
Mohora (5)	1 – 4	Putnok (3)
Főnix (4)	1 – 8	Siófok (3)
Dombóvári LK (4)	0 – 2	Budaörs (3)
Unione (4)	2 – 4	PTE-PEAC (Pécs) (3)
Karancslapujtő (4)	0 – 3	Sényő (3)
Pásztó (4)	1 – 4	Gödöllő (3)
Monostorpályi (4)	1 – 2	Füzesabony (3)
Hajdúszoboszló (4)	1 – 5	Tiszafüred (3)
Hajdúsámson (4)	0 – 2	Cigánd (3)
MVSC-Miskolc (4)	1 – 4	Ózd-Sajóvölgye (3)
Mezőkeresztes (4)	0 – 4	Mátészalka (4)
Tállya (4)	1 – 3	Vásárosnamény (4)
Nyírmeggyes (4)	3 – 5	CSO-KI Sport (4)
Tarpa (3)	3 – 1	Tiszaújváros (3)
Gyöngyös (4)	0 – 2	Eger (3)
Salgótarján (4)	3 – 1	Andornaktálya (4)
Kiskőrös (4)	0 – 3	BKV Előre (3)
Dunakeszi (4)	0 – 2	Pilis (4)
Orosháza (3)	3 – 7	Dunaharaszti (3)
Ráckeve (5)	0 – 7	ESMTK Budapest (3)
REAC (4)	3 – 2	Dabas (3)
Mezőmegyer (4)	2 – 4	Szajol (4)
Szegedi VSE (3)	0 – 4	Gyula (3)
Csepel (3)	1 – 1 (a.e.t.) (4 – 3 p)	Monor (3)
Sárrétudvari (4)	1 – 4	Hódmezővásárhely (3)
Mezőtúr (4)	0 – 3	Martfű (3)
Szolnok (4)	3 – 1	Jamina (4)
Solt (4)	1 – 6	Rákóczifalva (4)
Mezőberény (5)	0 – 3	Sándorfalva (4)
Tihany (4)	1 – 6	Szombathely (3)
Komárom (3)	6 – 4	Perutz (Pápa) (3)
Tata (4)	2 – 3	Koppánymonostor (4)
Bőny (5)	3 – 2	Újperint (4)
Devecser (4)	1 – 10	Bicske (3)
Sárvár (4)	5 – 3 (a.e.t.)	Zalalövő (4)
Balatonfüred (3)	2 – 3 (a.e.t.)	Tatabánya (3)
Balatonalmádi (4)	5 – 0	Körmend (4)
Mór (4)	4 – 0	Úrkút (4)
Komló (4)	1 – 3	Majosi SE (Bonyhád) (3)
Nagybajom (4)	0 – 4	Kaposvár (3)
Mohács (4)	2 – 0	Toponár (4)
Pénzügyőr (3)	2 – 1	Szekszárd (3)
Baja (4)	0 – 5	Nagykanizsa (3)
Nagyatád (4)	3 – 2 (a.e.t.)	Balatonlelle (3)
Mezőfalva (4)	0 – 2	Lajoskomárom (4)
Szepetnek (4)	0 – 5	Érd (3)
Harkány (4)	1 – 3	Sárbogárd (4)
Issimo (4)	4 – 0	Kiskunfélegyháza (4)
Heves (4)	2 – 4	Újfehértó (4)
Király (4)	1 – 4	Mosonmagyaróvár (3)
Gyirmót (3)	4 – 0	Sopron (3)
TFSE (4)	0 – 3	Iváncsa (3)
3 August 2025
Patak (5)	0 – 14	DEAC (3)
Bordány (4)	2 – 1 (a.e.t.)	Makó (4)
Mártély (5)	0 – 1	43. sz. Építők (4)
Jánoshalom (4)	0 – 4	Tiszaföldvár (3)
Koroncó (4)	0 – 1	Mezőörs (4)
Csesztreg (4)	0 – 6	Veszprém (3)
Ménfőcsanak (4)	1 – 4	Dorog (3)
Soproni FAC (5)	0 – 4	Kapuvár (4)
Szarvaskend (4)	2 – 1	Zalaszentgrót (4)
Sárisáp (4)	5 – 0	Teskánd (4)
Nyergesújfalu (4)	2 – 0	Celldömölk (4)
Mórágy (5)	2 – 1	Airnergy (5)
Villány (4)	1 – 1 (a.e.t.) (4 – 5 p)	Kelen (4)

=== Second round ===
Participating teams: The 72 First round winners entered the Second round.

The draw for the Second round was held on 7 August 2025. Competition Committee of MLSZ (Hungarian Football Federation) divided the teams that reached the second round of the Hungarian Cup into four regional pots based on their geographical location (North-East, South-East, North-West, South-West) so that amateur teams would not have to travel across the country for cup matches. A blind draw was used to decide between the four groups, as progression is still decided in one match, and the identity of the field selector was determined either by the draw or by the class difference (the one from the lower tier is the field selector). The duels are decided in one match.

Number of teams per tier entering this round
Nemzeti Bajnokság I (tier 1)	Nemzeti Bajnokság II (tier 2)	Nemzeti Bajnokság III (tier 3)	Megyei Bajnokság I (tier 4)	Megyei Bajnokság II (tier 5)	Total
12 / 12	16 / 16	40 / 51	29 / 83	3 / 10	100 / 172

Team 1	Score	Team 2
23 August 2025
III. Kerületi TVE (3)	5 – 0	BKV Előre (3)
43. sz. Építők (4)	1 – 3	Martfű (3)
CSO-KI Sport (4)	0 – 3	Putnok (3)
Lajoskomárom (4)	1 – 3	PTE-PEAC (Pécs) (3)
DEAC (3)	2 – 1 (a.e.t.)	Cigánd (3)
Kelen (4)	1 – 0	Dunaújváros (3)
Hódoscsépány (5)	0 – 3	Salgótarján (4)
Hatvan (3)	0 – 4	Tiszafüred (3)
Sényő (3)	0 – 4	Tarpa (3)
Gödöllő (3)	4 – 1 (a.e.t.)	Ózd-Sajóvölgye (3)
Újfehértó (4)	1 – 2	Füzesabony (3)
Mátészalka (4)	0 – 1	Vásárosnamény (4)
Szolnok (4)	2 – 1	Dunaharaszti (3)
Szajol (4)	6 – 1	Rákóczifalva (4)
Sándorfalva (4)	1 – 2	Hódmezővásárhely (3)
REAC (4)	1 – 0	Tiszaföldvár (3)
Gyula (3)	3 – 0	Csepel (3)
Bőny (5)	2 – 4	Mór (4)
Balatonalmádi (4)	1 – 2	Komárom (3)
Mosonmagyaróvár (3)	0 – 1	Gyirmót (3)
Kapuvár (4)	0 – 1	Dorog (3)
Koppánymonostor (4)	1 – 2	Sárvár (4)
Sárisáp (4)	1 – 2	Szarvaskend (4)
Nagyatád (4)	0 – 4	PMFC (3)
Iváncsa (3)	2 – 1	Pénzügyőr (3)
Mohács (4)	2 – 4	Majosi SE (Bonyhád) (3)
Sárbogárd (4)	1 – 6	Dombóvári FC (3)
Budaörs (3)	1 – 2	Nagykanizsa (3)
Kaposvár (3)	2 – 2 (3 – 4 p)	Érd (3)
Pilis (4)	5 – 1	Issimo (4)
Bicske (3)	0 – 2	Veszprém (3)
24 August 2025
Sajóbábony (4)	1 – 4	Eger (3)
Bordány (4)	0 – 8	ESMTK Budapest (3)
Nyergesújfalu (4)	0 – 3	Tatabánya (3)
Mezőörs (4)	3 – 2	Szombathely (3)
Mórágy (5)	1 – 8	Siófok (3)

=== Round of 64 ===
The 36 second round winners, the 12 teams in Tier 1, and the 16 teams in Tier 2 entered the Round of 64.

The draw for the Round of 64 was held on 25 August 2025.

Number of teams per tier entering this round
Nemzeti Bajnokság I (tier 1)	Nemzeti Bajnokság II (tier 2)	Nemzeti Bajnokság III (tier 3)	Megyei Bajnokság I (tier 4)	Total
12 / 12	16 / 16	25 / 51	11 / 83	64 / 172

Team 1	Score	Team 2
12 September 2025
Tatabánya (3)	0 – 2	Soroksár (2)
13 September 2025
Eger (3)	0 – 2	Budafok (2)
PTE-PEAC (Pécs) (3)	1 – 3	III. Kerületi TVE (3)
Vásárosnamény (4)	0 – 13	Zalaegerszeg (1)
Érd (3)	0 – 3	Győr (1)
Veszprém (3)	0 – 2	Debrecen (1)
Iváncsa (3)	0 – 1 (a.e.t.)	Kazincbarcika (1)
Szajol (4)	1 – 5	Paks (1)
Hódmezővásárhely (3)	1 – 3	Diósgyőr (1)
Gyula (3)	0 – 2	Mezőkövesd (2)
Nagykanizsa (3)	1 – 2	Kozármisleny (2)
Füzesabony (3)	0 – 4	BVSC (2)
Mór (4)	1 – 4	Budapest Honvéd (2)
Szolnok (4)	0 – 3	ESMTK Budapest (3)
Majosi SE (Bonyhád) (3)	2 – 0	Gödöllő (3)
Tiszafüred (3)	3 – 2	Putnok (3)
Salgótarján (4)	1 – 4	Tiszakécske (2)
Siófok (3)	1 – 7	MTK (1)
Szarvaskend (4)	0 – 15	Ferencváros (1)
REAC (4)	2 – 4	Karcag (2)
PMFC (3)	0 – 2	DEAC (3)
Békéscsaba (2)	0 – 0 (a.e.t.) (4 – 2 p)	Nyíregyháza (1)
Gyirmót (3)	0 – 1	Csákvár (2)
Vasas (2)	4 – 1	Puskás Akadémia (1)
Ajka (2)	3 – 1	Kisvárda (1)
Dorog (3)	0 – 2	Szeged (2)
Videoton (2)	3 – 0	Szentlőrinc (2)
14 September 2025
Kelen (4)	2 – 2 (a.e.t.) (2 – 0 p)	Tarpa (3)
Mezőörs (4)	1 – 0	Komárom (3)
Martfű (3)	4 – 4 (a.e.t.) (5 – 4 p)	Dombóvári FC (3)
Sárvár (4)	2 – 5	Pilis (4)
Kecskemét (2)	3 – 2 (a.e.t.)	Újpest (1)

==== Matches ====
12 September 2025	Tatabánya (3)	0–2	Soroksár (2)	Tatabánya
19:00 CEST	Preklet (yellow card) 89'	Report	Köböl 42'; Gálfi 80'; G. Tóth (yellow card) 89'	Stadium: Stadion Gyula Grosics; Attendance: 600; Referee: Ádám Papp

13 September 2025	Eger (3)	0–2	Budafok (2)	Eger
11:00 CEST	Valkay (yellow card) 55'	Report	Selyem 31' (yellow card) 85'; Gy. Varga 70'	Stadium: Szentmarjay Tibor Városi Stadion; Referee: Csaba Sándor

13 September 2025	PTE-PEAC (Pécs) (3)	1–3	III. Kerületi TVE (3)	Pécs
13:00 CEST	B. Varga (yellow card) 3'; Hawkins 58'	Report	Bencze 4' (pen.); Erdei 34'; Bozóki 54' (o.g.); Hegyi (yellow card) 89'; Farkas (yellow card) 90+1'	Stadium: Stadion PMFC; Referee: Vilmos Hartung Jr.

13 September 2025	Vásárosnamény (4)	0–13	Zalaegerszeg (1)	Vásárosnamény
14:00 CEST	Hadadi (red card) 45'	Report	Géci 8', 78' (o.g.); Skribek 12' (pen.); Sousa 30'; Bodnár 32'; Maxsuell 48'; Klausz 59'; Daniel 61', 77', 80'; Borges 63'; Csonka 67'; Bîtca 83'	Stadium: Sportpálya; Attendance: 1,200; Referee: Márió Zimmermann

13 September 2025	Érd (3)	0–3	Győr (1)	Érd
15:00 CEST	Pintér (penalty missed); Morvai (yellow card) 64'; Kárász (yellow card) 90'	Report	Schön 46'; Gavrić 55'; Benbouali 70'	Stadium: Novák Ferenc Érdi Sportközpont; Attendance: 600; Referee: Gábor Iványi

13 September 2025	Veszprém (3)	0–2	Debrecen (1)	Veszprém
15:00 CEST	Dobsa (yellow card) 46'; Molnár (yellow card) 59'; Baldauf (yellow card) 76'; Somogyi (yellow card) 81'	Report	Komáromi 35'; Bárány 63' (pen.); Szakál (yellow card) 83'	Stadium: Egyetemi Stadion; Attendance: 600; Referee: Tamás Sipos

13 September 2025	Iváncsa (3)	0–1 (a.e.t.)	Kazincbarcika (1)	Iváncsa
15:00 CEST	Aradi (yellow card) 42'; Ivády (yellow card) 57'; Aristotelis (yellow card) 111'	Report	Haroyan (yellow card) 30'; Eleke 98'	Stadium: Károlyi István Sporttelep; Referee: Márk Szigetvári

13 September 2025	Szajol (4)	1–5	Paks (1)	Szajol
15:00 CEST	Szentmiklósi 53'	Report	Hahn 8'; Haraszti 26'; Pető 81'; Böde 74', 85'	Stadium: Sporttelep; Referee: Tamás Ujhelyi

13 September 2025	Hódmezővásárhely (3)	1–3	Diósgyőr (1)	Hódmezővásárhely
15:00 CEST	Kálovits (yellow card) 36'; P. Tóth 39' (yellow card) 56'; Zámbori (yellow card) 65'; Rajsli (yellow card) 90+1'	Report	Šaponjić 26' (pen.), 37' (pen.) (yellow card) 33'; A. Keita 73'	Stadium: Városi Stadion; Attendance: 1,000; Referee: Bence Hanyecz

13 September 2025	Gyula (3)	0–2	Mezőkövesd (2)	Gyula
15:00 CEST		Report	Szalai 16', 32'	Stadium: Christián László Municipal Sports Complex; Referee: János Dobai

13 September 2025	Nagykanizsa (3)	1–2	Kozármisleny (2)	Nagykanizsa
15:00 CEST	Lőrincz 68'	Report	Babinszky 46'; Bíró 48'	Stadium: Olajbányász Stadion; Referee: Gergely Bana

13 September 2025	Füzesabony (3)	0–4	BVSC (2)	Füzesabony
15:00 CEST		Report	Horváth 25'; Hesz 42'; Székely 68'; Bacsa 74'	Stadium: Sporttelep; Referee: Dávid Juhász

13 September 2025	Mór (4)	1–4	Budapest Honvéd (2)	Mór
15:00 CEST	B. Varga 3'	Report	Baki 28'; Á. Sigér 47'; Kántor 62'; E. Kovács 89'	Stadium: Sporttelep; Referee: Ákos Takács

13 September 2025	Szolnok (4)	0–3	ESMTK Budapest (3)	Szolnok
15:00 CEST		Report	Ladányi 6'; Gincsai 47'; Desnica 83'	Stadium: Tiszaligeti Stadion; Referee: Dávid Hajdú

13 September 2025	Majosi SE (Bonyhád) (3)	2–0	Gödöllő (3)	Bonyhád-Majos
15:00 CEST	Ángyán 33' (pen.); Keresztes 90+3'	Report		Stadium: Sporttelep; Referee: Flórián Holczbauer

13 September 2025	Tiszafüred (3)	3–2	Putnok (3)	Tiszafüred
15:00 CEST	Szerencsi 33', 90+3'; Horváth 34'	Report	Juhos 13'; Talpalló 89'	Stadium: Lipcsey Elemér Sporttelep; Referee: Attila Nagy

13 September 2025	Salgótarján (4)	1–4	Tiszakécske (2)	Salgótarján
15:00 CEST	Kerek 83'	Report	Bouard 12'; Horváth 35', 55'; Pataki 47'	Stadium: Szojka Ferenc Stadion; Referee: Róbert Nagy

13 September 2025	Siófok (3)	1–7	MTK (1)	Siófok
16:00 CEST	Á. Gruber 58' (yellow card) 66'; D. Rácz (yellow card) 89'	Report	K. Németh 14', 17', 74'; Polievka 22'; Bognár 31', 89'; Fiáth 75' (o.g.); Széles (yellow card) 88'	Stadium: Révész Géza utcai Stadion; Attendance: 350; Referee: Péter Zierkelbach

13 September 2025	Szarvaskend (4)	0–15	Ferencváros (1)	Szarvaskend
16:00 CEST	Cseresnyés (yellow card) 90'	Report	Makreckis 13'; Júlio Romão (yellow card) 25'; Yusuf 30', 57', 73', 85'; Levi 38'; Arzani 42', 52', 67'; Abu Fani 61', 74'; Gólik 64', 76', 87'; Gartenmann 70'	Stadium: Sporttelep; Referee: Attila Molnár

13 September 2025	REAC (4)	2–4	Karcag (2)	Budapest
16:00 CEST	Vidovics 31'; Mátrai-Zsurzs 90+1'	Report	Szekszárdi 18', 75'; Pap 70'; Kovalovszki 86'	Stadium: Budai II. László Stadion; Referee: Bálint Juhász

13 September 2025	PMFC (3)	0–2	DEAC (3)	Pécs
17:00 CEST		Report	Török 15'; Lénárt 48'	Stadium: PMFC Stadion; Referee: Árpád Jakab

13 September 2025	Békéscsaba (2)	0–0 (a.e.t.) (4–2 p)	Nyíregyháza (1)	Békéscsaba
18:00 CEST	Mikló (yellow card) 21'; Takács (yellow card) 89'	Report	Farkas (yellow card) 23'; L. Katona (yellow card) 91'; Edomwonyi (yellow card) 93'; K. Varga (yellow card) 117'	Stadium: Kórház utcai Stadion; Attendance: 1,140; Referee: Péter Antal
	Penalties
	Mikló (penalty scored); Hodonicki (penalty scored); G. Nagy (penalty scored); Viczián (penalty scored)		(penalty missed) D. Babunski; (penalty scored) Kovácsréti; (penalty scored) Korrea; (penalty missed) Gilbert

13 September 2025	Gyirmót (3)	0–1	Csákvár (2)	Győr-Gyirmót
18:00 CEST		Report	Farkas 90+3'	Stadium: Alcufer Stadion; Referee: Ákos Gaál

13 September 2025	Vasas (2)	4–1	Puskás Akadémia (1)	Budapest
19:00 CEST	Cseke (yellow card) 20'; Pethő 37' (yellow card) 68'; M. Tóth 49'; Otigba 65'; Pávkovics 83'	Report	Maceiras (yellow card) 51'; Favorov 57' (yellow card) 66'; A. Németh (yellow card) 85'	Stadium: Illovszky Rudolf Stadion; Attendance: 1,997; Referee: Bence Csonka dr.

13 September 2025	Ajka (2)	3–1	Kisvárda (1)	Ajka
19:00 CEST	Doncsecz 48'; Tar 54'; Csizmadia (yellow card) 68'; Mohos (yellow card) 71'; Sejben 80'; Horváth (yellow card) 87'; Lakatos (yellow card) 90'	Report	Medgyes (yellow card) 59'; Chlumecký (yellow card) 63'; Mešanović 69'	Stadium: Városi Sportcentrum; Attendance: 1,000; Referee: Gergő Bogár

13 September 2025	Dorog (3)	0–2	Szeged (2)	Dorog
19:00 CEST		Report	Holman 30'; Borvető 69'	Stadium: Buzánszky Jenő Stadion; Referee: András Gáspár

13 September 2025	Videoton (2)	3–0	Szentlőrinc (2)	Székesfehérvár
19:00 CEST	R. Varga 5' (pen.), 71'; Spandler 60'	Report		Stadium: Sóstói Stadion; Referee: Tibor Farkas

14 September 2025	Kelen (4)	2–2 (a.e.t.) (2–0 p)	Tarpa (3)	Budapest
15:00 CEST	M. Tóth 26'; Orlai 82'; Szogolovszkij (yellow card) 90'	Report	Herman (yellow card) 46'; Stratan (yellow card) 54'; Kamyshanov (red card) 72'; Kuchynskyi 78'; Gál 90'; Bichanov (yellow card) 113'	Stadium: Kelen SC Sporttelep; Referee: Barnabás Drabon
	Penalties
	Orlai (penalty scored); Benkő (penalty scored)		Penalty missed

14 September 2025	Mezőörs (4)	1–0	Komárom (3)	Mezőörs
15:00 CEST	L. Szabó 52'	Report		Stadium: Sporttelep; Referee: Gergely Pusztai

14 September 2025	Martfű (3)	4–4 (a.e.t.) (5–4 p)	Dombóvári FC (3)	Martfű
15:00 CEST	Kinyig 13' (yellow card) 22'; Prozlik 13'; Balla (yellow card) 43'; Mahler 49', 108' (pen.) (yellow card) 72'; Székely (yellow card) 95'	Report	Kilin 66'; Párkányi 73' (pen.); Pintér 83'; D. Szabó 119'	Stadium: Sporttelep; Referee: Patrik Fehérvári
	Penalties
	Prozlik (penalty scored); Mahler (penalty scored); K. Horváth (penalty scored); Bódai (penalty scored); Kalmár (penalty scored)		(penalty scored) Gulyás; (penalty scored) Pintér; (penalty scored) Bunevácz; (penalty scored) Párkányi

14 September 2025	Sárvár (4)	2–5	Pilis (4)	Sárvár
15:00 CEST	Potyi 7'; Csákvári 10'	Report	Seregy 11'; Á. Tóth 36'; Huszárik 68'; Rácz 90'; Pácsa 90+1'	Stadium: Sporttelep; Referee: Kevin Linn

14 September 2025	Kecskemét (2)	3–2 (a.e.t.)	Újpest (1)	Kecskemét
16:15 CEST	Derekas 6' (yellow card) 31'; A. Szabó 38'; Eördögh (yellow card) 40'; Merényi (yellow card) 90'; Banó-Szabó 109'; Győrfi (yellow card) 114'; Czékus (yellow card) 115'; B. Varga (yellow card) 115'	Report	Kr. Horváth 9'; Duarte (yellow card) 37'; Tučić (yellow card) 44'; Medeiros 70'; Fiola (yellow card) 114'; Bese (yellow card) 118'	Stadium: Széktói Stadion; Attendance: 1,532; Referee: Mihály Káprály

=== Round of 32 ===
The 32 Round of 64 winners entered the Round of 32.

The draw for the Round of 32 was held on 14 September 2025.

Number of teams per tier entering this round
Nemzeti Bajnokság I (tier 1)	Nemzeti Bajnokság II (tier 2)	Nemzeti Bajnokság III (tier 3)	Megyei Bajnokság I (tier 4)	Total
8 / 12	15 / 16	6 / 51	3 / 83	32 / 172

Team 1	Score	Team 2
28 October 2025
Diósgyőr (1)	2 – 0	Szeged (2)
29 October 2025
Martfű (3)	1 – 4	Paks (1)
DEAC (3)	1 – 0 (a.e.t.)	BVSC (2)
Majosi SE (Bonyhád) (3)	0 – 1	Videoton (2)
Kelen (4)	0 – 1	Kazincbarcika (1)
Karcag (2)	2 – 3 (a.e.t.)	Csákvár (2)
Kecskemét (2)	2 – 1	Tiszafüred (3)
Ajka (2)	2 – 1 (a.e.t.)	Tiszakécske (2)
Vasas (2)	3 – 0	Mezőörs (4)
Kozármisleny (2)	0 – 0 (2 – 3 p)	ESMTK Budapest (3)
Győr (1)	9 – 0	Pilis (4)
MTK (1)	5 – 1	Mezőkövesd (2)
Ferencváros (1)	4 – 0	Békéscsaba (2)
30 October 2025
III. Kerületi TVE (3)	0 – 1	Soroksár (2)
Zalaegerszeg (1)	3 – 1	Budafok (2)
Debrecen (1)	1 – 2 (a.e.t.)	Budapest Honvéd (2)

==== Matches ====
28 October 2025	Diósgyőr (1)	2–0	Szeged (2)	Miskolc
20:00 CET	Sajbán 36', 69'; Keita (yellow card) 45+1'; Holdampf (yellow card) 64'	Report	Szilágyi (yellow card) 13'; Vágó (yellow card) 25'	Stadium: Diósgyőri Stadion; Attendance: 2,005; Referee: Péter Zierkelbach

29 October 2025	Martfű (3)	1–4	Paks (1)	Martfű
12:30 CET	Prozlik (yellow card) 25'; Kinyig 29'; Mahler (yellow card) 59'	Report	J. Szabó 22'; Böde 59', 62'; B. Balogh 79'	Stadium: Sporttelep; Attendance: 600; Referee: Ákos Takács

29 October 2025	DEAC (3)	1–0 (a.e.t.)	BVSC (2)	Debrecen
12:30 CET	Lénárt (yellow card) 42' (goal) 101'; Jankelic (yellow card) 83'; D. Tóth (yellow card) 91'; Kelemen (yellow card) 99'	Report	Király (yellow card) 68'; Nemes (yellow card) 76'; Ureche (yellow card) 116'	Stadium: DEAC Stadion; Referee: Róbert Nagy

29 October 2025	Majosi SE (Bonyhád) (3)	0–1	Videoton (2)	Bonyhád-Majos
12:30 CET		Report	G. Bobál 52'; Bedi (yellow card) 87'; G. Kocsis (yellow card) 90+3'	Stadium: Sporttelep; Referee: Patrik Fehérvári

29 October 2025	Kelen (4)	0–1	Kazincbarcika (1)	Budapest
12:30 CET	Meszlényi (yellow card) 24'; Kádár (yellow card) 30'; Benkő (yellow card) 51'; Czerula (yellow card) 56'	Report	Gyollai (yellow card) 8'; Eleke 85'; Sós (yellow card) 90+3'	Stadium: Kelen SC Sporttelep; Attendance: 600; Referee: Árpád Jakab

29 October 2025	Karcag (2)	2–3 (a.e.t.)	Csákvár (2)	Karcag
12:30 CET	Sághy 58'; Girsik 68' (pen.) (yellow card) 101'; K. Szűcs (yellow card) 90+2'	Report	Fejős 26' (yellow card) 45+2'; Karacs (yellow card) 41'; Baracskai (yellow card) 89'; Bányai (yellow card) 89'; A. Farkas 90+4'; Zs. Magyar (yellow card) 85' (goal) 105+1'	Stadium: Lipcsey Elemér Sporttelep; Attendance: 200; Referee: Balázs Katona

29 October 2025	Kecskemét (2)	2–1	Tiszafüred (3)	Kecskemét
17:00 CET	Berki 39'; Belényesi (yellow card) 45'; Bocskay (yellow card) 66' (goal) 73' (pen.); B. Kovács (yellow card) 89'; Haris (yellow card) 90+2'	Report	M. Kovács 55'; Füredi (yellow card) 75'	Stadium: Széktói Stadion; Attendance: 1,184; Referee: Bence Hanyecz

29 October 2025	Ajka (2)	2–1 (a.e.t.)	Tiszakécske (2)	Ajka
17:00 CET	Mohos (yellow card) 41'; Tar (yellow card) 51'; Cipf 94'; Csóka (yellow card) 105'; N. Kovács 116'	Report	Zámbó 12'; Valencsik 66'; Ramos 74'; Lucas 103'	Stadium: Városi Sportcentrum; Attendance: 250; Referee: Tamás Móri

29 October 2025	Vasas (2)	3–0	Mezőörs (4)	Budapest
17:15 CET	Wágenhoffer 26' (o.g.); Rab (yellow card) 28'; Ottucsák (yellow card) 57'; B. Pethő 72'; R. Horváth 90+1'	Report	Kerékgyártó (yellow card) 26'; Deákovits (yellow card) 71'	Stadium: Illovszky Rudolf Stadion; Attendance: 1,470; Referee: Marcell Derdák

29 October 2025	Kozármisleny (2)	0–0 (a.e.t.) (2–3 p)	ESMTK Budapest (3)	Kozármisleny
17:30 CET	Pesti (yellow card) 55'; Oroszi (yellow card) 75'; D. Kocsis (yellow card) 93'; Jelena (yellow card) 93'	Report	R. Molnár (yellow card) 49'; R. Horváth (yellow card) 75'; T. Molnár (yellow card) 103'; Puskás (yellow card) 115'	Stadium: Alkotmány tér stadion Attendance: 500; Referee: Ákos Gaál
	Penalties
	Jelena (penalty missed); Turi (penalty missed); Bakó (penalty scored); Babinszky (penalty scored); D. Horváth (penalty missed)		Burzi (penalty scored); T. Molnár (penalty scored); Slezák (penalty missed); Desnica (penalty scored)

29 October 2025	Győr (1)	9–0	Pilis (4)	Győr
18:00 CET	Abrahamsson 5' (yellow card) 41'; Njie 8', 37'; Pyshchur 24', 29'; Huszár 45+1' (pen.); Živković 49', 57'; Urblík (yellow card) 62'; Boldor 67' (yellow card) 84'; Tollár (yellow card) 74'	Report	Nemes (yellow card) 47'; M. Rácz (yellow card) 64'; Á. Tóth (yellow card) 65'	Stadium: ETO Park; Attendance: 2,153; Referee: Mihály Káprály

29 October 2025	MTK (1)	5–1	Mezőkövesd (2)	Budapest
20:00 CET	Átrok 13'; P. Kovács 34', 82'; Plšek 55'; K. Németh 69'	Report	Kata 5' (o.g.); Vidnyánszky (yellow card) 87'	Stadium: Hidegkuti Nándor Stadion; Attendance: 1,714; Referee: Gábor Iványi

29 October 2025	Ferencváros (1)	4–0	Békéscsaba (2)	Budapest
20:00 CET	Joseph 24', 90+2'; Pešić 29'; Zachariassen 45'	Report	Zsolnai (yellow card) 31'	Stadium: Ferencváros Stadion; Attendance: 6,493; Referee: Balázs Berke

30 October 2025	III. Kerületi TVE (3)	0–1	Soroksár (2)	Budapest
12:30 CET	Wirth (yellow card) 65'; Lencsés (red card) 69'	Report	Gálfi 78'; Köböl (yellow card) 90+3'	Stadium: Hévízi úti Stadion; Referee: Imre Kovács

30 October 2025	Zalaegerszeg (1)	3–1	Budafok (2)	Zalaegerszeg
18:00 CET	Szendrei 14' (pen.); Bakti 53'; Krajcsovics 54'	Report	Posztobányi (yellow card) 36'; Horgosi 47'; Gy. Varga (yellow card) 87'	Stadium: ZTE Arena; Referee: Tamás Sipos

30 October 2025	Debrecen (1)	1–2 (a.e.t.)	Budapest Honvéd (2)	Debrecen
20:00 CET	Dzsudzsák 22' (yellow card) 75'; Gordić (yellow card) 96'	Report	Kántor (yellow card) 46'; Pauljević 55'; B. Varga (yellow card) 96'; Pinte (yellow card) 109'; Zuigéber 117' (yellow card) 119'; Baki (yellow card) 119'	Stadium: Nagyerdei Stadion; Attendance: 4,412; Referee: Tamás Bognár

=== Round of 16 ===
The 16 Round of 32 winners entered the Round of 16.

On 12 January 2026 Competition Committee of MLSZ (Hungarian Football Federation) set the starting date for the round of 16 of the MOL Hungarian Cup. Seven matches will be held on 11 February, while the Győri ETO FC-Videoton FC match remains for 12 February.

Number of teams per tier entering this round
Nemzeti Bajnokság I (tier 1)	Nemzeti Bajnokság II (tier 2)	Nemzeti Bajnokság III (tier 3)	Total
7 / 12	7 / 16	2 / 51	16 / 172

Team 1	Score	Team 2
11 February 2026
DEAC (3)	0 – 1	Soroksár (2)
Ajka (2)	0 – 1	Kazincbarcika (1)
Budapest Honvéd (2)	2 – 0	ESMTK Budapest (3)
Zalaegerszeg (1)	2 – 1	Vasas (2)
Ferencváros (1)	4 – 0	Csákvár (2)
MTK (1)	1 – 2	Kecskemét (2)
Paks (1)	2 – 6	Diósgyőr (1)
12 February 2026
Győr (1)	2 – 0	Videoton (2)

==== Matches ====
11 February 2026	DEAC (3)	0–1	Soroksár (2)	Debrecen
12:30 CET	Lakatos (yellow card) 65'	Report	Korozmán (yellow card) 22'; B. Lovrencsics 81'	Stadium: DEAC Stadion; Attendance: 300; Referee: Tamás Ujhelyi

11 February 2026	Ajka (2)	0–1	Kazincbarcika (1)	Ajka
16:30 CET	Csörnyei (yellow card) 43'; Cipf (yellow card) 49'; N. Nagy (yellow card) 61'	Report	Kártik 34' (pen.); Meskhi (yellow card) 77'; Baranyai (yellow card) 86'	Stadium: Városi Sportcentrum; Attendance: 400; Referee: Péter Antal

11 February 2026	Budapest Honvéd (2)	2–0	ESMTK Budapest (3)	Budapest
17:00 CET	Baki 59'; Csontos (yellow card) 73'; Z. Medgyes 86'; Kállai (yellow card) 90+3'	Report	T. Molnár (yellow card) 44'; B. Soós 55'; Schildkraut (yellow card) 65'; Slezák (yellow card) 83'	Stadium: Bozsik Aréna; Attendance: 2,531; Referee: Márton Rúsz

11 February 2026	Zalaegerszeg (1)	2–1	Vasas (2)	Zalaegerszeg
17:00 CET	Amato 52'; B. Kiss 59'; N. Szendrei (yellow card) 90+2'	Report	Pávkovics (yellow card) 26'; Urblík 50' (pen.); R. Horváth (yellow card) 54'; Zimonyi (yellow card) 90'	Stadium: ZTE Arena; Attendance: 2,144; Referee: Gergő Bogár

11 February 2026	Ferencváros (1)	4–0	Csákvár (2)	Budapest
17:30 CET	Joseph 12', 15'; Zachariassen 18'; Cadu 40'	Report	Radics (yellow card) 58'	Stadium: Ferencváros Stadion; Attendance: 5,167; Referee: Bence Csonka dr.

11 February 2026	MTK (1)	1–2	Kecskemét (2)	Budapest
18:00 CET	Armalas 20'; Á. Molnár (yellow card) 64'	Report	M. Papp (yellow card) 7'; Czékus 10'; Derekas 23' (pen.); A. Szabó (yellow card) 51'	Stadium: Hidegkuti Nándor Stadion; Attendance: 1,926; Referee: Tamás Bognár

11 February 2026	Paks (1)	2–6	Diósgyőr (1)	Paks
20:00 CET	Lenzsér (yellow card) 14'; Windecker 25'; Ádám 43'; Alaxai (yellow card) 64'; Ke. Horváth (yellow card) 74'	Report	Croizet 1'; Sajbán 12'; Má. Mucsányi 20', 60'; Colley 28', 47' (yellow card) 49'; Bokros (yellow card) 48'	Stadium: Fehérvári úti Stadion; Attendance: 1,312; Referee: Mihály Káprály

12 February 2026	Győr (1)	2–0	Videoton (2)	Győr
18:00 CET		Report		Stadium: ETO Park; Referee: Ferenc Karakó

=== Quarter-finals ===
The eight Round of 16 winners entered the quarter-finals.

Number of teams per tier entering this round
Nemzeti Bajnokság I (tier 1)	Nemzeti Bajnokság II (tier 2)	Total
5 / 12	3 / 16	8 / 172

Team 1	Score	Team 2
3 March 2026
Győr (1)	3 – 1 (a.e.t.)	Kecskemét (2)
4 March 2026
Zalaegerszeg (1)	1 – 0	Soroksár (2)
Kazincbarcika (1)	0 – 5	Ferencváros (1)
5 March 2026
Budapest Honvéd (2)	1 – 0	Diósgyőr (1)

==== Matches ====
3 March 2026	Győr (1)	3–1 (a.e.t.)	Kecskemét (2)	Győr
20:00 CET	Gavrić 68', 120'; Bánáti (yellow card) 94'; Csinger (yellow card) 105'; Pyshchur 115' (yellow card) 115'; Boldor (yellow card) 121'	Report	Bolyki 12'; Bocskay (yellow card) 55'; Derekas (yellow card) 62'; A. Szabó (yellow card) 76'; Debreceni (yellow card) 76'	Stadium: ETO Park; Attendance: 3,720; Referee: Mihály Káprály

4 March 2026	Zalaegerszeg (1)	1–0	Soroksár (2)	Zalaegerszeg
17:15 CET	Várkonyi (yellow card) 20'; N. Szendrei (yellow card) 66'; Lucas Alfonso 86'	Report	Köböl (yellow card) 79'; D. Lukács (yellow card) 88'	Stadium: ZTE Arena; Attendance: 2,109; Referee: Márton Rúsz

4 March 2026	Kazincbarcika (1)	0–5	Ferencváros (1)	Miskolc
20:00 CET		Report	Yusuf 21', 41'; Gómez 25'; Joseph 30'; Cadu 45'; Rommens (yellow card) 76'	Stadium: Diósgyőri Stadion; Attendance: 1,164; Referee: Imre Kovács

5 March 2026	Budapest Honvéd (2)	1–0	Diósgyőr (1)	Budapest
20:00 CET	Pauljević (yellow card) 25'; Szamosi (yellow card) 27'; Baki (yellow card) 48'; Gyurcsó 64'; Kállai (yellow card) 82'; K. Varga (yellow card) 90+3'	Report	Tamás (yellow card) 72'	Stadium: Bozsik Aréna; Attendance: 3,934; Referee: Ferenc Karakó

=== Semi-finals ===
The four quarter-final winners entered the semi-finals. The draw for the Semi-finals was held on 20 March 2026.

Number of teams per tier entering this round
Nemzeti Bajnokság I (tier 1)	Nemzeti Bajnokság II (tier 2)	Total
3 / 12	1 / 16	4 / 172

Team 1	Score	Team 2
21–22 April 2026
Budapest Honvéd (2)	2 – 2 (a.e.t.) (4 – 5 p)	Zalaegerszeg (1)
Ferencváros (1)	2 – 2 (a.e.t.) (3 – 2 p)	Győr (1)

==== Matches ====
21 April 2026	Budapest Honvéd (2)	2–2 (a.e.t.) (4–5 p)	Zalaegerszeg (1)	Budapest
20:00 CEST	Pekár (yellow card) 7'; Csonka (yellow card) 34'; Pauljević 44'; Csontos (yellow card) 76'; T. Szabó (yellow card) 87'; Szamosi 101'; A. Szabó (yellow card) 110'	Report	López (yellow card) 50'; Calderón (yellow card) 56'; Szendrei (yellow card) 74'; João Victor 90+3' (yellow card) 90+3'; Alfonso 92'; Bîtca (yellow card) 107'	Stadium: Bozsik Aréna; Attendance: 5,450; Referee: Bence Csonka dr.
	Penalties
	Csontos (penalty scored); Szamosi (penalty scored); A. Szabó (penalty missed); Nyers (penalty scored); Zuigéber (penalty scored)		Szendrei (penalty scored); Victory (penalty scored); B. Kiss (penalty scored); Alfonso (penalty scored); Skribek (penalty scored)

22 April 2026	Ferencváros (1)	2–2 (a.e.t.) (3–2 p)	Győr (1)	Budapest
20:00 CEST	Kovačević 5' (yellow card) 15'; O'Dowda (yellow card) 29'; Levi 45+4'; Raemaekers (yellow card) 53'; Gruber (yellow card) 120'	Report	Pyshchur (yellow card) 18'; Csinger 40'; Bumba 45+1'; Vlădoiu (yellow card) 50'; R. Tóth (yellow card) 119'	Stadium: Groupama Aréna; Attendance: 12,122; Referee: Tamás Bognár
	Penalties
	Abu Fani (penalty missed); Gruber (penalty scored); Raemaekers (penalty scored); Joseph (penalty missed); Corbu (penalty scored)		Vitális (penalty missed); Krpić (penalty scored); Štefulj (penalty scored); Benbouali (penalty missed); Gavrić (penalty missed)

=== Final ===
The final will be held between the two semi-final winners. The winner will qualify for the first qualifying round of 2026–27 Europa League.

Team 1	Score	Team 2
9 May 2026
Ferencváros (1)	1–0 (a.e.t.)	Zalaegerszeg (1)

9 May 2026
18:00 CEST

Ferencváros (1)	1–0 (a.e.t.)	Zalaegerszeg (1)
Szalai (yellow card) 87'; Bamidele (penalty missed) 95'; Raemaekers 111'; Abu Fani (yellow card) 114'	Report	Teixeira (yellow card) 96'; N. Szendrei (yellow card) 100'

Puskás Aréna, Budapest
Attendance: 49,858
Referee: Márton Rúsz

== Bracket ==
Round of 16
11 February 2026
Ajka (2)	0
Kazincbarcika (1)	1
11 February 2026
Ferencváros (1)	4
Csákvár (2)	0
12 February 2026
Győri ETO (1)	2
Videoton (2)	0
11 February 2026
MTK Budapest (1)	1
Kecskemét (2)	2
11 February 2026
Budapest Honvéd (2)	2
ESMTK Budapest (3)	0
11 February 2026
Paks (1)	2
Diósgyőr (1)	6
11 February 2026
Zalaegerszeg (1)	2
Vasas (2)	1
11 February 2026
DEAC (3)	0
Soroksár (2)	1

Quarter-finals
4 March 2026
Kazincbarcika (1)	0
Ferencváros (1)	5
3 March 2026
Győri ETO (1) (a.e.t.)	3
Kecskemét (2)	1
5 March 2026
Budapest Honvéd (2)	1
Diósgyőr (1)	0
4 March 2026
Zalaegerszeg (1)	1
Soroksár (2)	0

Semi-finals
22 April 2026
Ferencváros (1) (p)	2 (3)
Győri ETO (1)	2 (2)
21 April 2026
Budapest Honvéd (2)	2 (4)
Zalaegerszeg (1) (p)	2 (5)

Final
9 May 2026
Ferencváros (1) (a.e.t.)	1
Zalaegerszeg (1)	0

== Statistics ==
=== Top goalscorers ===
As of match played 9 May 2026 (completed)

Rank	Player	Club	Goals
1	(Hungary) Ádám Gruber	Siófok	6
1	(Hungary) Gergő Lénárt	DEAC	6
1	(Nigeria) Bamidele Yusuf	Ferencváros	6
4	(Hungary) Raul Csörgő	PMFC	5
4	(Hungary) Bence Szenczi	Siófok	5
4	(France) Lenny Joseph	Ferencváros	5
7	(Hungary) Gergő Ács	Balatonalmádi	4
7	(Hungary) Nándor Benedek	Szajol	4
7	(Hungary) Dániel Böde	Paks	4
7	(Hungary) Bence Bunevácz	Dombóvári FC	4
7	(Ukraine) Yaroslav Helesh	PMFC	4
7	(Hungary) Gergő Ladányi	ESMTK Budapest	4
7	(Hungary) Bence Lőrinczi	Nagykanizsa	4
7	(Hungary) Krisztián Németh	MTK	4
7	(Hungary) Dániel Pruska	Szombathelyi Haladás	4
7	(Hungary) Miklós Szerencsi	Tiszafüred	4
7	(Hungary) Krisztián Zádori	Gyula	4

== See also ==
- 2025–26 in Hungarian football
- 2026 Magyar Kupa final
- 2025–26 Nemzeti Bajnokság I
- 2025–26 Nemzeti Bajnokság II
- 2025–26 Nemzeti Bajnokság III
- 2025–26 Megyei Bajnokság I
