= 2024–25 Nemzeti Bajnokság III =

Nemzeti Bajnokság III
- Season: 2024–25
- Champions: Mosonmagyaróvár (Northwest); Nagykanizsa (Southwest); Karcag (Northeast); Tiszakécske (Southeast)
- Promoted: Karcag; Tiszakécske
- Top goalscorer: Bence Babinszky, Kaposvár (25 goals)

The 2024–25 Nemzeti Bajnokság III is Hungary's third-level football competition.

== Overview ==
16 teams will compete in 4 groups. Out of the four group winners, two team will be promoted via promotion play-offs. The last 3 teams in each group and the two worst 13th placed team will get relegated.

== Teams ==
The following teams have changed division since the 2023–24 season.

=== Stadium and locations ===
Location of teams and stadiums in 2024–25 Nemzeti Bajnokság III.
Yellow: Northwest, Red: Northeast, Blue: Southwest, Green: Southeast
Location of Budapest metropolitan area teams.
Green: Northwest, Red: Northeast, Blue: Southwest, Yellow: Southeast

Following is the list of clubs competing in the league this season, with their location, stadium and stadium capacity.

Note: Table lists in alphabetical order.

==== Northwest ====
Team	Location	Stadium	Capacity
III. Kerület	Budapest (Óbuda)	Hévízi úti Stadion	914
Balatonfüred	Balatonfüred	Balatonfüredi Sporttelep	
Bicske	Bicske	Bicskei Sportpálya	
Budaörs	Budaörs	Árok utcai Stadion	1,300
Dorog	Dorog	Buzánszky Jenő Stadion	5,000
Érd	Érd	Ercsi úti Pálya	3,500
Gyirmót II	Győr (Gyirmót)	Alcufer Stadion	2,291
Győr II	Győr (Gyárváros)	ETO Park, Camping Pálya	1,000
Haladás VSE	Szombathely	Haladás Sporttelep	
Kelen	Budapest (Kelenföld)	Hunyadi Mátyás utca	1,500
Komárom	Komárom	Czibor Zoltán Városi Sporttelep	4,132
Puskás Akadémia II	Felcsút	PFLA füves IV. pálya	
Sopron	Sopron	Káposztás utcai Stadion	4,500
Veszprém	Veszprém	Városi Stadion	4,000
Újpest II	Budapest (Újpest)	Chinoin Sport és Szabadidő Központ	700

==== Northeast ====
Team	Location	Stadium	Capacity
Cigánd	Cigánd	Cigándi Sportpálya	1,000
Debreceni EAC	Debrecen	Dóczy József utcai Sportpálya	3,200
Debreceni VSC II	Debrecen	Dóczy József utcai Sportpálya	3,200
Diósgyőr II	Miskolc (Diósgyőr)	DVTK Stadion II	
Eger	Eger	Szentmarjay Tibor Városi Stadion	6,000
Hatvan	Hatvan	Népkert Sporttelep	
Karcag	Karcag	Ligeti úti Sporttelep	2,500
Kisvárda II	Kisvárda	Várkerti Stadion	2,993
Nyíregyháza II	Nyíregyháza	Örökösföldi Sportelep	
Mátészalka	Mátészalka	MTK Stadion	2,000
Putnok	Putnok	Várady Béla Sportközpont	3,000
Salgótarján	Salgótarján	Szojka Ferenc Stadion	7,000
Sényő	Sényő	Sényői Sportpálya	
Tiszafüred	Tiszafüred	Lipcsey Elemér Sporttelep	
Tiszaújváros	Tiszaújváros	Tiszaújvárosi Sport Park	4,000

==== Southwest ====
Team	Location	Stadium	Capacity
Bonyhád	Bonyhád	Sport úti Pálya	2,500
Dunaföldvár	Dunaföldvár	Dunaföldvári Sportpálya	
Dunaharaszti	Dunaharaszti	DMTK Stadium	1,196
Főnix	Székesfehérvár	Főnix Park	
Ferencváros II	Budapest (Ferencváros)	Sárosi György pálya	3,000
Gárdony	Gárdony	Agárdi Parkerdő Sportközpont	1,400
Iváncsa	Iváncsa	Károlyi István Sporttelep	
Kaposvár	Kaposvár	Rákóczi Stadion	7,000
Majos	Bonyhád (Majos)	Majosi Sportpálya	600
MTK Budapest II	Budapest (Józsefváros)	Sándor Károly Labdarúgó Akadémia	
Nagykanizsa	Nagykanizsa	Olajbányász Sporttelep	7,000
Paks II	Paks	Fehérvári úti Stadion, Artificial turf pitch	
PEAC	Pécs	Stadion PMFC	7,000
PMFC	Pécs	Stadion PMFC	7,000
Szekszárd	Szekszárd	Városi Stadion	7,500

==== Southeast ====
Team	Location	Stadium	Capacity
BKV Előre	Budapest (Józsefváros)	Sport utcai Stadion	2,500
Csepel	Budapest (Csepel)	Béke téri Stadion	10,000
Dabas	Dabas	Wellis Sportpark	2,500
ESMTK	Budapest (Pesterzsébet)	Ady Endre utca	5,000
Gyula	Gyula	Christián László Sports Complex	2,700
Honvéd II	Budapest (Kispest)	Honvéd MFA Utánpótlás Központ	
Hódmezővásárhely	Hódmezővásárhely	Városi Stadion	10,000
Kecskemét II	Kecskemét	Műkertvárosi Sportcentrum	
Martfű	Martfű	LSE Sporttelep	
Monor	Monor	Balassi Bálint utcai Stadion	2,250
Pénzügyőr	Budapest (Pasarét)	NAV Sporttelep	3,000
Szegedi VSE	Szeged	Szegedi VSE Stadion	5,000
Szolnok	Szolnok	Tiszaligeti Stadion	3,437
Tiszaföldvár	Tiszaföldvár	Sportpálya	
Vasas II	Budapest (Angyalföld)	Illovszky Rudolf Stadion	1,000

== Standings ==
=== Northwest (Észak-Nyugat) ===
Pos	Team	Pld	W	D	L	GF	GA	GD	Pts	Promotion or relegation
1	Mosonmagyaróvár (C)	30	21	6	3	58	18	+40	69	Qualification to promotion play-offs
2	Bicske	30	21	2	7	54	26	+28	65	
3	Veszprém	30	17	6	7	42	27	+15	57	
4	Győri ETO II	30	16	5	9	53	49	+4	53	
5	Puskás Akadémia II	30	15	7	8	47	32	+15	52	
6	III. Kerület	30	14	6	10	56	39	+17	48	
7	Budaörs	30	14	5	11	56	50	+6	47	
8	Komárom	30	12	10	8	48	35	+13	46	
9	Érd	30	13	4	13	31	30	+1	43	
10	Sopron	30	8	10	12	33	40	−7	34	
11	Újpest II	30	8	5	17	42	53	−11	29	
12	Dorog	30	7	8	15	35	50	−15	29	
13	Haladás VSE	30	6	11	13	37	54	−17	29	
14	Balatonfüred (R)	30	7	6	17	29	46	−17	27	Relegation to Megyei Bajnokság I
15	Gyirmót II (R)	30	5	7	18	41	75	−34	22	Relegation to Megyei Bajnokság I
16	Kelen (R)	30	5	4	21	24	62	−38	19	Relegation to Megyei Bajnokság I

Source: Soccerway
Rules for classification: 1) Points; 2) Matches won; 3) Goal difference; 4) Goals scored; 5) Head-to-head points; 6) Head-to-head goal difference; 7) Fair play ranking; 8) Drawing of lots.
(C) Champions; (R) Relegated

=== Northeast (Észak-Kelet) ===
Pos	Team	Pld	W	D	L	GF	GA	GD	Pts	Promotion or relegation
1	Karcag (C)	30	21	7	2	66	25	+41	70	Qualification to promotion play-offs
2	Debreceni EAC	30	21	4	5	50	24	+26	67	
3	Putnok	30	19	3	8	66	31	+35	60	
4	Tiszafüred	30	14	8	8	50	43	+7	50	
5	Tiszaújváros	30	14	7	9	41	39	+2	49	
6	Kisvárda II	30	12	9	9	37	36	+1	45	
7	Cigánd	30	12	7	11	43	37	+6	43	
8	Eger	30	10	8	12	40	49	−9	38	
9	Diósgyőr II	30	10	7	13	40	41	−1	37	
10	Debreceni VSC II	30	9	9	12	42	49	−7	36	
11	Nyíregyháza Spartacus II	30	9	8	13	47	44	+3	35	
12	Sényő	30	9	5	16	41	61	−20	32	
13	Füzesabony	30	8	6	16	36	51	−15	30	
14	Hatvan (R)	30	7	9	14	29	45	−16	30	Relegation to Megyei Bajnokság I
15	Salgótarján (R)	30	7	8	15	31	56	−25	29	Relegation to Megyei Bajnokság I
16	Mátészalkai MTK (R)	30	3	5	22	25	53	−28	14	Relegation to Megyei Bajnokság I

Updated to match(es) played on 25 May 2025 (Completed). Source: Soccerway
Rules for classification: 1) Points; 2) Matches won; 3) Goal difference; 4) Goals scored; 5) Head-to-head points; 6) Head-to-head goal difference; 7) Fair play ranking; 8) Drawing of lots.
(C) Champions; (R) Relegated

=== Southwest (Dél-Nyugat) ===
Pos	Team	Pld	W	D	L	GF	GA	GD	Pts	Promotion or relegation
1	Nagykanizsa (C)	30	23	5	2	73	24	+49	74	Qualification to promotion play-offs
2	Iváncsa	30	21	5	4	94	26	+68	68	
3	Ferencváros II	30	17	12	1	67	31	+36	63	
4	Kaposvári Rákóczi	30	18	8	4	78	33	+45	62	
5	Pécsi MFC	30	18	6	6	66	29	+37	60	
6	Siófok	30	15	10	5	56	32	+24	55	
7	Paksi II	30	12	6	12	51	46	+5	42	
8	Majos	30	11	7	12	40	45	−5	40	
9	MTK Budapest II	30	11	5	14	58	57	+1	38	
10	Dunaharaszti MTK	30	10	8	12	47	45	+2	38	
11	Bonyhád Völgység	30	10	5	15	38	55	−17	35	
12	Szekszárd	30	6	7	17	30	54	−24	25	
13	PEAC	30	6	3	21	27	70	−43	21	
14	Főnix (R)	30	6	3	21	36	90	−54	21	Relegation to Megyei Bajnokság I
15	Gárdony (R)	30	5	6	19	34	71	−37	21	Relegation to Megyei Bajnokság I
16	Dunaföldvár (R)	30	1	4	25	22	109	−87	7	Relegation to Megyei Bajnokság I

Updated to match(es) played on 25 May 2025. Source: Soccerway
Rules for classification: 1) Points; 2) Matches won; 3) Goal difference; 4) Goals scored; 5) Head-to-head points; 6) Head-to-head goal difference; 7) Fair play ranking; 8) Drawing of lots.
(C) Champions; (R) Relegated

=== Southeast (Dél-Kelet) ===
Pos	Team	Pld	W	D	L	GF	GA	GD	Pts	Promotion or relegation
1	Tiszakécske (C)	30	20	7	3	68	25	+43	67	Qualification to promotion play-offs
2	Várfürdő-Gyulai Termál	30	19	7	4	59	27	+32	64	
3	Monor	30	19	7	4	59	28	+31	64	
4	Vasas II	30	20	2	8	57	32	+25	62	
5	ESMTK	30	18	8	4	66	29	+37	62	
6	Szegedi VSE	30	12	7	11	46	49	−3	43	
7	Honvéd II	30	11	7	12	43	36	+7	40	
8	Hódmezővásárhely	30	9	11	10	43	40	+3	38	
9	Tiszaföldvár	30	10	7	13	27	39	−12	37	
10	Csepel	30	8	5	17	35	50	−15	29	
11	Dabas	30	8	5	17	32	48	−16	29	
12	Martfű	30	8	5	17	32	58	−26	29	
13	Pénzügyőr	30	7	6	17	24	54	−30	27	
14	BKV Előre (R)	30	6	9	15	32	39	−7	27	Relegation to Megyei Bajnokság I
15	Szolnok (R)	30	7	4	19	27	69	−42	25	Relegation to Megyei Bajnokság I
16	Kecskeméti II (R)	30	6	7	17	28	55	−27	25	Relegation to Megyei Bajnokság I

Updated to match(es) played on 25 May 2025. Source: Soccerway
Rules for classification: 1) Points; 2) Matches won; 3) Goal difference; 4) Goals scored; 5) Head-to-head points; 6) Head-to-head goal difference; 7) Fair play ranking; 8) Drawing of lots.
(C) Champions; (R) Relegated

== Promotion play-offs ==
Two of the champions of the four groups of Nemzeti Bajnokság III will replace the two teams eliminated from Nemzeti Bajnokság II this year and will start the 2025–26 season in the second division. Promotion will be decided by a play-off, in which the champions of NB III will decide in a two-legged duel which of them will move up one division. In the Northeast group, Karcag, which has been unbeaten since October, in the Southeast group, Tiszakécske, which was also unbeaten in 2025, won the championship in the North-West, Mosonmagyaróvár in the Northwest and Nagykanizsa in the Southwest, so these four teams competed against each other in the qualifying competition for promotion.

Team 1	Agg.	Team 2	1st leg	2nd leg
Mosonmagyaróvár	2–3	Tiszakécske	0–3	0–2
Nagykanizsa	4–4 (a.e.t.) (3–4 p)	Karcag	2–2	2–2

=== Mosonmagyaróvár–Tiszakécske ===
1 June 2025 First leg	Mosonmagyaróvár	0–3	Tiszakécske	Mosonmagyaróvár
17:30 CEST	Illés (yellow card) 11'; Lasz (yellow card) 44'; Mayer (yellow card) 51'; Monda (yellow card) 52'; Simita (yellow card) 80'	Report	Szekér (yellow card) 11'; Sipos 48'; Bányai 55'; Csáki 86'; Balázs (yellow card) 89'	Stadium: MTE 1904 Sporttelep; Attendance: 1,000; Referee: Márió Zimmermann; Assistant referees: Gábor Máyer, Viktor Nagy

8 June 2025 Second leg	Tiszakécske	0–2 (3–2 agg.)	Mosonmagyaróvár	Tiszakécske
17:00 CEST	Takács (yellow card) 36'; D. Pintér (yellow card) 83'	Report	Szalka 4'; Deák (yellow card) 39'; Pongrács (yellow card) 47'; Z. Gera 55'; Monda (yellow card) 76'; Illés (yellow card) 76'; Gáncs (yellow card) 90'	Stadium: Városi Sportcentrum; Attendance: 800; Referee: Árpád Jakab; Assistant referees: Vencel Tóth II, Dániel Sinkovicz

=== Nagykanizsa–Karcag ===
1 June 2025 First leg	Nagykanizsa	2–2	Karcag	Tiszakécske
17:30 CEST	László 8'; Ekker (yellow card) 32'; M. Nagy 37' (yellow card) 46'; Kovalovszki (yellow card) 90+4'; János (yellow card) 90+4'	Report	Sághy (yellow card) 14'; Székely (yellow card) 22'; Szakács 44'; Talpalló 87'	Stadium: Városi Sportcentrum; Attendance: 2,000; Referee: Marcell Derdák; Assistant referees: Gergely Becséri, Dávid Rózsa

8 June 2025 Second leg	Karcag	2–2 (a.e.t.) (4–4 agg.) (4–3 p)	Nagykanizsa	Karcag
17:00 CEST	Székely (yellow card) 21'; Szakács 84', 105+1'; K. Szabó (yellow card) 92'; Csörgő (yellow card) 93'; Szűcs (yellow card) 119'	Report	T. Kovács (yellow card) 41'; László (yellow card) 65'; Terbe (yellow card) 71'; Szanyi (yellow card) 86'; János (yellow card) 89'; Ekker 90+5' (yellow card) 119'; Kovalovszki (yellow card) 95'; M. Nagy (yellow card) 96'; Lőrincz 114'	Stadium: Liget úti Sporttelep; Attendance: 1,800; Referee: Márton Rúsz; Assistant referees: Ákos Berényi, Gyula Punya
	Penalties
	Girsik (penalty scored); Csörgő (penalty scored); Győri (penalty scored); Sághy (penalty scored)		M. Nagy (penalty scored); Kovalovszki (penalty scored); László (penalty scored); Deme (penalty missed); János (penalty missed)

== Season statistics ==
=== Top goalscorers ===
After Regular season, the promotion play-offs matches do not include.

==== Northwest (Észak-Nyugat) ====
As of match played 25 May 2025

Rank	Player	Club	Goals
1	(Hungary) József Magasföldi	Puskás Akadémia FC II	20
2	(Hungary) Dominik Sandal	Komárom	17
3	(Hungary) Ádám Balajti	Budaörs	15
4	(Hungary) Tamás Szabó	Sopron	13
5	(Hungary) Bálint Tömösvári	Veszprém	12

==== Northeast (Észak-Kelet) ====
As of match played 25 May 2025

Rank	Player	Club	Goals
1	(Hungary) Levente Tóth	Eger	19
2	(Hungary) Gábor Boros	Putnok	16
2	(Hungary) Zoltán Horváth	Mátészalka	16
4	(Hungary) Ádám Czimer-Nyitrai	Nyíregyháza Spartacus II	14
4	(Hungary) Dávid Nagy	Tiszaújváros	14
4	(Hungary) Dávid Székely	Karcag	14

==== Southwest (Dél-Nyugat) ====
As of match played 25 May 2025

Rank	Player	Club	Goals
1	(Hungary) Bence Babinszky	Kaposvár	25
2	(Hungary) Csongor Bata	Dunaharaszti	19
2	(Hungary) Noel Kenesei	MTK II	19
2	(Hungary) Szabolcs Major	Siófok	19
2	(Hungary) Péter Törőcsik	Iváncsa	19
6	(Hungary) Norbert János	Nagykanizsa	16
6	(Hungary) Benjámin Vass	Iváncsa	16

==== Southeast (Dél-Kelet) ====
As of match played 25 May 2025

Rank	Player	Club	Goals
1	(Hungary) Bence Soós	ESMTK	19
2	(Hungary) Bálint Rideg	Vasas II	17
3	(Hungary) László Horváth	Monor	14
4	(Hungary) Márton Gréczi	Hódmezővásárhely	13
4	(Hungary) László Kerék	BKV Előre	13

== See also ==
- 2024–25 Magyar Kupa
- 2024–25 Nemzeti Bajnokság I
- 2024–25 Nemzeti Bajnokság II
- 2024–25 Megyei Bajnokság I
