= 2023–24 Megyei Bajnokság I =

Megyei Bajnokság I
- Season: 2023–24

The 2023–24 Megyei Bajnokság I includes the championships of 20 counties in Hungary. It is the fourth tier of the Hungarian football league system.

== Bács-Kiskun ==
Pos	Team	Pld	W	D	L	GF	GA	GD	Pts
1	Tiszakécske II (C)	28	18	5	5	89	32	+57	59
2	Kunbaja	28	17	6	5	64	25	+39	57
3	Jánoshalma	28	16	6	6	58	30	+28	54
4	Soltvadkert	28	15	8	5	51	25	+26	53
5	Lajosmizse	28	14	5	9	53	41	+12	47
6	Harta	28	12	5	11	66	54	+12	41
7	Akasztó	28	12	5	11	43	52	−9	41
8	Kiskunfélegyháza	28	11	8	9	37	48	−11	41
9	Kalocsa	28	11	6	11	49	36	+13	39
10	Kiskőrös	28	10	6	12	47	62	−15	36
11	Baja	28	10	3	15	38	51	−13	33
12	Kecel	28	8	3	17	39	77	−38	27
13	Kecskeméti LC	28	7	6	15	34	50	−16	27
14	Hírös-Ép	28	5	6	17	30	55	−25	21
15	Bácsalmás	28	3	4	21	29	89	−60	13

Updated to match(es) played on 1 June 2024. Source: Hungarian Football Federation
(C) Champions

== Baranya ==
Pos	Team	Pld	W	D	L	GF	GA	GD	Pts	Promotion or relegation
1	Villány (C, Q)	28	19	5	4	78	34	+44	61 (Note: Villány were deducted 1 point)	Qualification for promotion play-offs
2	Pécsvárad	28	17	5	6	66	29	+37	55 (Note: Pécsvárad were deducted 1 point)	
3	Pécsi EAC II	28	14	4	10	49	39	+10	46	
4	Bóly	28	14	3	11	54	52	+2	45	
5	Siklós	28	13	4	11	38	50	−12	43	
6	Komlói Bányász	28	7	6	15	43	61	−18	27	
7	Pécsi VSK	28	4	8	16	23	51	−28	20	
8	Nagykozár	28	5	3	20	33	68	−35	13 (Note: Nagykozár were deducted 5 points)	

Updated to match(es) played on 25 May 2024. Source: Hungarian Football Federation
(C) Champions; (Q) Qualified for the phase indicated

== Békés ==
Pos	Team	Pld	W	D	L	GF	GA	GD	Pts	Promotion or relegation
1	Gyula (C, Q)	27	25	1	1	114	10	+104	76	Qualification for promotion play-offs
2	Békéscsaba II	27	18	4	5	69	37	+32	58	
3	Szarvas	27	18	3	6	73	27	+46	57	
4	Orosháza	27	15	4	8	68	40	+28	49	
5	Mezőhegyesi	27	13	2	12	51	56	−5	41	
6	Szeghalom	27	8	7	12	49	63	−14	31	
7	Nagyszénás	27	8	7	12	44	70	−26	31	
8	Medgyesbodzás	27	5	2	20	28	97	−69	17	
9	Gyomaendrőd	27	4	3	20	37	83	−46	15	
10	Jamina	27	4	1	22	20	70	−50	13	

Updated to match(es) played on 28 May 2024. Source: Hungarian Football Federation
(C) Champions; (Q) Qualified for the phase indicated

== Borsod-Abaúj-Zemplén ==
Pos	Team	Pld	W	D	L	GF	GA	GD	Pts	Promotion or relegation
1	Ózd-Sajóvölgye (C, Q)	30	27	3	0	103	14	+89	84	Qualification for promotion play-offs
2	Gesztely	30	20	5	5	62	25	+37	65	
3	Miskolc	30	15	6	9	71	45	+26	51	
4	Parasznya	30	14	6	10	55	54	+1	48	
5	Mezőkeresztes	30	14	3	13	52	48	+4	45	
6	Bánhorváti	30	12	5	13	45	48	−3	41	
7	Emőd	30	12	4	14	56	64	−8	40	
8	Hidasnémeti	30	13	6	11	55	47	+8	39 (Note: Hidasnémeti were deducted 6 points)	
9	Alsózsolca	30	11	5	14	51	59	−8	38	
10	Edelény	30	10	7	13	37	59	−22	37	
11	Felsőzsolca	30	9	10	11	57	54	+3	37	
12	Sajóbábony	30	10	6	14	50	55	−5	36	
13	Tállya	30	10	5	15	44	54	−10	35	
14	Bőcs	30	8	4	18	65	85	−20	28	
15	Szirmabesenyő	30	7	7	16	36	68	−32	28	
16	Sárospatak	30	6	2	22	38	98	−60	20	

Updated to match(es) played on 1 June 2024. Source: Hungarian Football Federation
(C) Champions; (Q) Qualified for the phase indicated

=== Budapest ===
Pos	Team	Pld	W	D	L	GF	GA	GD	Pts	Promotion or relegation
1	Csepel TC (C, Q)	30	27	2	1	91	22	+69	83	Qualification for promotion play-offs
2	Budafok II	30	20	6	4	78	32	+46	66	
3	Unione	30	19	5	6	72	34	+38	62	
4	SZAC Budapest	30	17	9	4	61	24	+37	60	
5	Szabadkikötő	30	14	8	8	84	59	+25	50	
6	Testvériség	30	13	7	10	55	42	+13	46	
7	Issimo	30	14	2	14	63	76	−13	44	
8	43. Sz. Építők	30	10	5	15	54	57	−3	35	
9	Testnevelési Főiskola	30	10	5	15	45	60	−15	34 (Note: Testnevelési Főiskola were deducted 1 point for exceeding the permitted number of substitutions against Svábhegy.)	
10	Fővárosi Vízművek	30	8	10	12	43	47	−4	34	
11	Csepel UFC	30	8	6	16	41	67	−26	30	
12	II. Kerület	30	6	10	14	35	58	−23	28	
13	Gázgyár	30	8	6	16	35	48	−13	26 (Note: Gázgyár were deducted 4 points for the falsification of the minutes.)	
14	Svábhegy	30	5	10	15	31	74	−43	25	
15	Pestszentimre	30	6	4	20	29	72	−43	21 (Note: Pestszentimre were deducted 1 point)	
16	Szent István	30	6	3	21	45	90	−45	21	

Updated to match(es) played on 25 May 2024. Source: Hungarian Football Federation
(C) Champions; (Q) Qualified for the phase indicated

== Csongrád-Csanád ==
=== Regular stage ===
Pos	Team	Pld	W	D	L	GF	GA	GD	Pts	Qualification
1	Szegedi VSE	22	20	0	2	98	26	+72	60	Qualification for promotion group
2	Algyő	22	14	4	4	50	20	+30	46	Qualification for promotion group
3	Mórahalom	22	13	4	5	54	24	+30	43	Qualification for promotion group
4	Tiszasziget	22	12	7	3	52	22	+30	43	Qualification for promotion group
5	Kiskundorozsma	22	13	3	6	40	23	+17	42	Qualification for promotion group
6	Makó	22	9	4	9	44	49	−5	31	Qualification for promotion group
7	Balástya	22	8	2	12	35	56	−21	26	Qualification for relegation group
8	Szentes	22	6	4	12	40	58	−18	22	Qualification for relegation group
9	Hódmezővásárhely II	22	6	1	15	33	60	−27	19	Qualification for relegation group
10	Bordány	22	5	4	13	31	59	−28	19	Qualification for relegation group
11	Ásotthalom	22	4	4	14	21	56	−35	16	Qualification for relegation group
12	FK Szeged	22	3	1	18	21	66	−45	10	Qualification for relegation group

Source: Hungarian Football Federation

=== Promotion group ===
Pos	Team	Pld	W	D	L	GF	GA	GD	Pts	Promotion
1	Szegedi VSE (C, P)	32	26	1	5	124	38	+86	79	Qualification for promotion play-offs
2	Algyő	32	19	5	8	66	33	+33	62	
3	Tiszasziget	32	18	8	6	67	39	+28	62	
4	Mórahalom	32	18	4	10	68	44	+24	58	
5	Kiskundorozsma	32	17	4	11	50	34	+16	55	
6	Makó	32	11	4	17	58	71	−13	37	

Source: Hungarian Football Federation
(C) Champions; (P) Promoted

=== Relegation group ===
Pos	Team	Pld	W	D	L	GF	GA	GD	Pts
1	Hódmezővásárhely II	32	12	2	18	55	72	−17	38
2	Balástya	32	11	4	17	55	84	−29	37
3	Bordány	32	10	7	15	47	73	−26	37
4	Szentes	32	9	8	15	63	81	−18	35
5	Ásotthalom	32	9	6	17	40	69	−29	33
6	FK Szeged	32	5	1	26	37	92	−55	16

Source: Hungarian Football Federation

== Fejér ==
Pos	Team	Pld	W	D	L	GF	GA	GD	Pts	Promotion or relegation
1	Főnix (C, P)	28	22	3	3	102	24	+78	69	Qualification for promotion play-offs
2	Sárbogárd	28	21	2	5	89	27	+62	65	
3	Mór	28	18	3	7	64	38	+26	57	
4	Kápolnásnyék	28	15	7	6	55	38	+17	52	
5	Tordas	28	14	8	6	54	28	+26	50	
6	Ercsi Kinizsi	28	14	4	10	60	45	+15	46	
7	Lajoskomárom	28	13	6	9	48	34	+14	45	
8	Sárosd	28	10	10	8	60	34	+26	40	
9	Maroshegy	28	11	6	11	49	45	+4	39	
10	Mány-Bicske II	28	8	6	14	34	72	−38	30	
11	Csór	28	7	5	16	41	63	−22	26	
12	Mezőfalva	28	6	7	15	41	65	−24	25	
13	Enying	28	5	5	18	37	95	−58	20	
14	Martonvásár	28	3	8	17	17	59	−42	17	
15	Bodajk	28	1	4	23	17	101	−84	7	

Updated to match(es) played on 1 June 2024. Source: Hungarian Football Federation
(C) Champions; (P) Promoted

== Győr-Moson-Sopron ==
Pos	Team	Pld	W	D	L	GF	GA	GD	Pts
1	Koroncó (C)	24	21	0	3	71	26	+45	63
2	Mezőörs	24	19	2	3	74	15	+59	59
3	Lipót	24	14	6	4	48	27	+21	48
4	Győrújbarát	24	15	2	7	57	30	+27	47
5	Vitnyéd	24	14	2	8	53	33	+20	44
6	Hegykő	24	12	3	9	39	38	+1	39
7	Kapuvár	24	10	2	12	47	42	+5	32
8	Bácsa	24	9	5	10	51	36	+15	32
9	Abda	24	9	2	13	39	59	−20	29
10	Gönyű	24	8	0	16	29	67	−38	24
11	Ménfőcsanak	24	6	1	17	31	55	−24	18 (Note: Ménfőcsanak were deducted 1 point)
12	Győrújfalu	24	4	2	18	29	63	−34	14
13	Nádorváros	24	1	1	22	13	90	−77	4

Updated to match(es) played on 1 June 2024. Source: Hungarian Football Federation
(C) Champions

== Hajdú-Bihar ==
Pos	Team	Pld	W	D	L	GF	GA	GD	Pts	Promotion or relegation
1	Monostorpályi (C, Q)	26	22	2	2	74	26	+48	68	Qualification for promotion play-offs
2	Sárrétudvar	26	17	4	5	69	35	+34	55	
3	Hajdúszoboszló	26	17	3	6	91	25	+66	54	
4	Hajdúnánás	26	17	3	6	63	24	+39	54	
5	Hajdúsámson	26	14	4	8	72	40	+32	46	
6	Hajdúböszörmény	26	11	7	8	35	30	+5	40	
7	Debreceni EAC II	26	11	4	11	41	46	−5	37	
8	Nyíradony	26	10	7	9	55	42	+13	37	
9	Berettyóújfalu	26	11	2	13	45	51	−6	35	
10	Balmazújváros	26	10	5	11	40	39	+1	35	
11	BeStrong	26	6	4	16	41	62	−21	22	
12	Nagyrábé	26	3	5	18	35	73	−38	14	
13	Létavértes	26	3	4	19	30	117	−87	13	
14	Egyek	26	2	2	22	25	106	−81	8	

Updated to match(es) played on 25 May 2024. Source: Hungarian Football Federation
(C) Champions; (Q) Qualified for the phase indicated

== Heves ==
Pos	Team	Pld	W	D	L	GF	GA	GD	Pts	Promotion or relegation
1	Füzesabony (C, Q)	24	21	2	1	93	11	+82	65	Qualification for promotion play-offs
2	Lőrinci	24	17	3	4	67	24	+43	54	
3	Andornaktálya	24	16	3	5	56	32	+24	51	
4	Heréd	24	15	3	6	64	39	+25	48	
5	Gyöngyöshalász	24	13	6	5	45	27	+18	45	
6	Maklár	24	12	3	9	69	42	+27	39	
7	Egerszalók	24	9	7	8	46	44	+2	34	
8	Heves	24	10	2	12	55	44	+11	32	
9	Energia	24	9	1	14	42	60	−18	28	
10	Besenyőtelek	24	5	1	18	28	82	−54	16	
11	Eger II	24	4	3	17	35	69	−34	15	
12	Bélapát	24	4	3	17	40	97	−57	15	
13	Petőfibánya	24	2	1	21	21	90	−69	7	

Source: Hungarian Football Federation
(C) Champions; (Q) Qualified for the phase indicated

== Jász-Nagykun-Szolnok ==
Pos	Team	Pld	W	D	L	GF	GA	GD	Pts	Promotion or relegation
1	Tiszaföldvár (C, Q)	30	28	0	2	134	21	+113	84	Qualification for promotion play-offs
2	Jászberény	30	23	2	5	95	28	+67	71	
3	Mezőtúr	30	22	4	4	106	25	+81	70	
4	Jászfényszaru	30	22	2	6	81	17	+64	68	
5	Törökszentmiklós	30	20	2	8	81	32	+49	62	
6	Szajol	30	19	5	6	70	52	+18	62	
7	Jánoshida	30	14	4	12	60	56	+4	46	
8	Kisújszállás	30	14	3	13	63	57	+6	45	
9	Tószeg	30	12	5	13	58	58	0	41	
10	Rákóczifalva	30	10	1	19	49	99	−50	31	
11	Lurkó Focimánia	30	9	3	18	31	89	−58	30	
12	Kenderes	30	7	4	19	48	80	−32	25	
13	Kunszentmárton	30	6	4	20	44	86	−42	22	
14	Tiszagyenda	30	4	2	24	43	112	−69	14	
15	Kunhegyes	30	4	2	24	43	121	−78	14	
16	Cserkeszőlő	30	3	3	24	24	97	−73	12	

Updated to match(es) played on 25 May 2024. Source: Hungarian Football Federation
(C) Champions; (Q) Qualified for the phase indicated

=== Komárom-Esztergom ===
Pos	Team	Pld	W	D	L	GF	GA	GD	Pts	Promotion or relegation
1	Nyergesújfalu (C)	24	17	4	3	65	28	+37	55	
2	Tata (Q)	24	17	2	5	69	30	+39	53	Qualification for promotion play-offs
3	Koppánymonostor	24	16	5	3	71	19	+52	53	
4	Zsámbék	24	15	6	3	60	15	+45	51	
5	Sárisáp	24	13	5	6	54	29	+25	44	
6	Bábolna	24	11	4	9	51	38	+13	37	
7	Kecskéd	24	8	8	8	51	56	−5	32	
8	Almásfüzitő	24	8	3	13	36	72	−36	27	
9	Lábatlan	24	6	6	12	45	66	−21	24	
10	Tát	24	7	2	15	41	59	−18	23	
11	Vértessomló	24	6	3	15	39	63	−24	21	
12	Vértesszőlős	24	5	0	19	35	82	−47	15	
13	Esztergom	24	1	4	19	19	79	−60	7	

Source: Hungarian Football Federation
(C) Champions; (Q) Qualified for the phase indicated

== Nógrád ==
Pos	Team	Pld	W	D	L	GF	GA	GD	Pts	Promotion or relegation
1	Karancslapujtő (C)	28	22	3	3	92	34	+58	69	
2	Bánk-Dalnoki Akadémia (Q)	28	19	4	5	95	41	+54	61	Qualification for promotion play-offs
3	Érsekvadkert	28	16	4	8	62	42	+20	52	
4	Építők	28	16	3	9	72	38	+34	51	
5	Mohora	28	13	6	9	68	41	+27	45	
6	Pásztó	28	13	6	9	55	61	−6	45	
7	Szendehely	28	13	3	12	62	51	+11	42	
8	Héhalom	28	9	2	17	40	75	−35	29	
9	Diósjenő	28	8	6	14	53	65	−12	30	
10	Berkenye	28	7	0	21	25	80	−55	21	
11	Szécsény	28	5	4	19	33	70	−37	19	
12	Bátonyterenye	28	4	5	19	30	89	−59	17	
13	Palotás (Note: Palotás withdrew from the adult and youth leagues.) (D)	0	0	0	0	0	0	0	0	Excluded

Source: Magyarfutball
(C) Champions; (D) Disqualified; (Q) Qualified for the phase indicated

== Pest ==
Pos	Team	Pld	W	D	L	GF	GA	GD	Pts	Promotion or relegation
1	Dunaharaszti (C, Q)	30	26	1	3	77	15	+62	79	Qualification for promotion play-offs
2	Gödöllő	30	24	4	2	86	24	+62	76	
3	Dunavarsány	30	14	8	8	48	38	+10	50	
4	Vecsés	30	15	3	12	54	41	+13	48	
5	Budakalász	30	13	8	9	39	46	−7	47	
6	Dunakeszi	30	12	8	10	51	38	+13	44	
7	Vác	30	13	4	13	46	42	+4	43	
8	Cso-Ki Sport	30	10	10	10	42	45	−3	40	
9	Bugyi	30	10	9	11	32	44	−12	39	
10	Pilis	30	10	8	12	36	39	−3	38	
11	Örkény	30	10	7	13	41	60	−19	37	
12	Nagykáta	30	8	9	13	35	48	−13	33	
13	Biatorbágy	30	8	8	14	36	46	−10	32	
14	Perbál	30	9	4	17	49	50	−1	31	
15	Veresegyház	30	7	2	21	39	69	−30	23	
16	Felsőpakony	30	3	3	24	30	96	−66	12	

Updated to match(es) played on 1 June 2024. Source: Hungarian Football Federation
(C) Champions; (Q) Qualified for the phase indicated

== Somogy ==
Pos	Team	Pld	W	D	L	GF	GA	GD	Pts
1	Nagyatád (C)	30	27	2	1	122	17	+105	83
2	Nagybajom	30	22	4	4	84	34	+50	70
3	Kadarkút	30	21	2	7	66	37	+29	64 (Note: Kadarkút were deducted 1 point)
4	Balatonlelle	30	20	4	6	84	22	+62	64
5	Marcali	30	17	4	9	107	44	+63	55
6	Toponár	30	16	5	9	96	54	+42	53
7	Somogysárd	30	14	9	7	66	54	+12	51
8	Csurgó	30	11	6	13	53	56	−3	39
9	Balatoni Vasas	30	10	7	13	73	67	+6	37
10	Juta	30	9	6	15	50	53	−3	33
11	Barcs	30	7	8	15	46	81	−35	29
12	Balatonkeresztúr	30	7	7	16	45	67	−22	28
13	Kaposfüred	30	7	7	16	50	91	−41	28
14	Tab	30	5	6	19	37	77	−40	21
15	Öreglak	30	5	1	24	39	127	−88	16
16	Segesd	30	3	0	27	26	163	−137	9

Updated to match(es) played on 25 May 2024. Source: Hungarian Football Federation
(C) Champions

== Szabolcs-Szatmár-Bereg ==
Pos	Team	Pld	W	D	L	GF	GA	GD	Pts	Promotion or relegation
1	Tarpa (C)	30	20	4	6	66	27	+39	64	
2	Mátészalka (Q)	30	19	7	4	70	28	+42	64	Qualification for promotion play-offs
3	Nagyecsed	30	19	3	8	69	39	+30	60	
4	Mándok	30	18	6	6	65	26	+39	60	
5	Kállósemjén	30	16	8	6	65	38	+27	56	
6	Újfehértó	30	15	8	7	73	47	+26	53	
7	Nyírbátor	30	15	7	8	75	52	+23	52	
8	Nyíregyháza II	30	13	3	14	61	55	+6	42	
9	Nyírbéltek	30	11	3	16	41	61	−20	36	
10	Csenger	30	10	6	14	67	79	−12	36	
11	Kótaj	30	7	11	12	52	68	−16	32	
12	Nagykálló	30	8	7	15	33	62	−29	31	
13	Kemecse	30	7	5	18	43	68	−25	26	
14	Vásárosnamény	30	7	6	17	41	64	−23	24 (Note: Vásárosnamény were deducted 3 points)	
15	Ibrány	30	6	5	19	26	69	−43	23	
16	Nyírmeggyes	30	3	3	24	35	99	−64	12	

Source: Hungarian Football Federation
(C) Champions; (Q) Qualified for the phase indicated

== Tolna ==
Pos	Team	Pld	W	D	L	GF	GA	GD	Pts	Promotion or relegation
1	Bonyhád (C, P)	14	11	1	2	54	9	+45	34	Qualification for promotion play-offs
2	Dombóvár	14	11	0	3	54	18	+36	33	
3	Kakasd	14	10	1	3	28	18	+10	31	
4	Bölcske	14	9	1	4	47	14	+33	28	
5	Bátaszék	14	6	3	5	37	24	+13	21	
6	ASE Paks	14	4	0	10	22	54	−32	12	
7	Nagymányok	14	1	0	13	9	53	−44	3	
8	Mórágy	14	1	0	13	14	75	−61	3	

Source: Hungarian Football Federation
(C) Champions; (P) Promoted

== Vas ==
Pos	Team	Pld	W	D	L	GF	GA	GD	Pts	Promotion or relegation
1	Haladás II (C, P)	30	26	4	0	110	24	+86	82	Qualification for promotion play-offs
2	Király	30	22	4	4	84	22	+62	70	
3	Vép	30	21	7	2	86	36	+50	70	
4	Sárvár	30	20	6	4	97	34	+63	66	
5	Szarvaskend	30	17	6	7	87	51	+36	56 (Note: Szarvaskend were deducted 1 point)	
6	Söpte	30	13	8	9	54	48	+6	47	
7	Szentgotthárd	30	12	10	8	50	44	+6	46	
8	Vasvár	30	13	4	13	48	53	−5	43	
9	Celldömölk	30	13	2	15	57	56	+1	41	
10	Csepreg	30	10	2	18	31	51	−20	32	
11	Rábapaty	30	8	5	17	41	83	−42	29	
12	Csákánydoroszló	30	8	4	18	44	79	−35	28	
13	Körmend	30	8	2	20	37	59	−22	26	
14	Táplán	30	7	5	18	49	96	−47	26	
15	Nádasd	30	2	5	23	26	92	−66	11	
16	Bük	30	2	2	26	18	91	−73	8	

Updated to match(es) played on 25 May 2024. Source: Hungarian Football Federation
(C) Champions; (P) Promoted

== Veszprém ==
Pos	Team	Pld	W	D	L	GF	GA	GD	Pts	Promotion or relegation
1	Balatonalmádi (C, Q)	30	24	2	4	96	31	+65	74	Qualification for promotion play-offs
2	Fűzfő	30	22	4	4	87	44	+43	70	
3	Pápa	30	21	6	3	103	25	+78	69	
4	Úrkút	30	21	4	5	102	30	+72	67	
5	Tihany	30	18	2	10	89	41	+48	56	
6	Sümeg	30	17	4	9	69	55	+14	55	
7	Szentantalfa	30	13	6	11	70	77	−7	45	
8	Balatonfüredi USC	30	12	3	15	75	51	+24	39	
9	Zirc	30	10	7	13	50	60	−10	37	
10	Ajka SE	30	13	3	14	56	53	+3	36 (Note: Ajka SE were deducted 6 points for their U11 and U7 team non-appearance in Bozsik Association programmes.)	
11	Pét	30	10	2	18	47	82	−35	32	
12	Csetény	30	9	2	19	45	90	−45	29	
13	Devecser	30	6	2	22	43	105	−62	20	
14	RAC	30	6	2	22	36	102	−66	20	
15	Magyarpolány	30	5	5	20	40	77	−37	20	
16	Várpalota	30	5	2	23	43	128	−85	17	

Source: Hungarian Football Federation
(C) Champions; (Q) Qualified for the phase indicated

== Zala ==
Pos	Team	Pld	W	D	L	GF	GA	GD	Pts
1	Csesztreg (C)	26	20	3	3	81	22	+59	63
2	Hévíz	26	17	3	6	81	33	+48	54
3	Zalaszentgrót	26	16	5	5	60	27	+33	53
4	Szepetnek	26	15	5	6	68	40	+28	50
5	Teskánd	26	14	6	6	71	31	+40	48
6	Zalalövő	26	13	4	9	52	31	+21	43
7	Semjénháza	26	13	4	9	46	35	+11	43
8	Andráshida SC	26	10	4	12	42	56	−14	34
9	Zalakomár-Zalakaros	26	9	2	15	46	70	−24	29
10	Andráshida TE	26	7	6	13	40	60	−20	27
11	Kiskanizsai Sáskák	26	8	2	16	41	74	−33	26
12	Gyenesdiás	26	6	2	18	34	86	−52	20
13	Lenti	26	5	4	17	41	70	−29	19
14	Murakeresztúr	26	2	4	20	34	102	−68	10

Source: Hungarian Football Federation
(C) Champions

== Promotion play-offs ==
The draw was held on 4 June 2024, 11:00 CEST, in the HFF headquarters in Budapest. The first legs were played on 8 June, and the second legs were played on 12 June.

=== Matches ===
Team 1	Agg.	Team 2	1st leg	2nd leg
Csepel TC		Tata	8 Jun	12 Jun
Gyula		Bánk-Dalnoki Akadémia	8 Jun	12 Jun
Mátészalka		Dunaharaszti	8 Jun	12 Jun
Monostorpályi		Füzesabony	8 Jun	12 Jun
Ózd-Sajóvölgye		Balatonalmádi	8 Jun	12 Jun
Tiszaföldvár		Villány	8 Jun	12 Jun

==== Details ====
All times Central European Summer Time (UTC+2)

8 June 2023
15:00

Csepel TC	v	Tata
	Report

Béke téri Stadion, Budapest
Referee: Ákos Gaál
12 June 2023
17:00

Tata	v	Csepel TC

Új úti Sporttelep, Tata

8 June 2023
15:00

Gyula	v	Bánk-Dalnoki Akadémia
	Report

id. Christián László Városi Sporttelep, Gyula
Referee: Tamás Berényi
12 June 2023
17:00

Bánk-Dalnoki Akadémia	v	Gyula

Érsekvadkerti SE sportpályák, Érsekvadkert

8 June 2023
15:00

Mátészalka	v	Dunaharaszti
	Report

Városi Sporttelep, Mátészalka
Referee: Róbert Nagy
12 June 2023
17:00

Dunaharaszti	v	Mátészalka

Dunaharaszti MTK Sporttelep, Dunaharaszti

8 June 2023
15:00

Monostorpályi	v	Füzesabony
	Report

Hosszúpályi Sporttelep, Hosszúpályi
Referee: László Lovas
12 June 2023
17:00

Füzesabony	v	Monostorpályi

Füzesabony Sporttelep, Füzesabony

8 June 2023
15:00

Ózd-Sajóvölgye	v	Balatonalmádi
	Report

Városi Stadion, Ózd
12 June 2023
17:00

Balatonalmádi	v	Ózd-Sajóvölgye

Balatonalmádi Sportközpont, Balatonalmádi

8 June 2023
15:00

Tiszaföldvár	v	Villány
	Report

Tiszaföldvári VSE Sporttelep, Tiszaföldvár
Referee: Imre Kovács
12 June 2023
17:00

Villány	v	Tiszaföldvár

Villány TC Sporttelep, Villány

== See also ==
- 2023–24 Magyar Kupa
- 2023–24 Nemzeti Bajnokság I
- 2023–24 Nemzeti Bajnokság II
- 2023–24 Nemzeti Bajnokság III
