= Gyulai Termál FC =

Hungarian football club

Gyulai FC
- Full name: Gyulai Futball Club
- Founded: 1913
- Ground: Christián László Municipal Sports Complex
- Capacity: 2,700
- League: NB III; Southeast
- 2023–24: MB I Békés, 1st of 10 (promoted via play-offs)
Home colours

Gyulai Futball Club is a professional football club based in Gyula, Békés County, Hungary, that competes in the Nemzeti Bajnokság III – Southeast, the third tier of Hungarian football.

== Name changes ==
- 1920–22: Gyulai Ipari Munkás Testedző Egyesület
- 1922–48: Gyulai Testedző Egyesület
- 1948–49: Gyulai Sportegyesület
- 1949–51: Gyulai SzSE
- 1951–55: Gyulai Építők SK
- 1955–57: Gyulai Traktor SK
- 1957: Gyulai Hunyadi
- 1957–73: Gyulai MEDOSZ Sport Klub
- 1973–92: Gyulai Sportegyesület
- 1992–95: Gyulai Futball Club
- 1995–97: Gyula-Kanton FC
- 1997–98: Gyula-West Group FC
- 1998–09: Gyulai Termál Futball Club
- 2009–present: Várfürdő-Gyulai Termál Futball Club

== Honours ==
- Nemzeti Bajnokság II:
  - Runners-up (1): 1980–81
- Nemzeti Bajnokság III:
  - Winners (1): 1949–50

=== County Leagues (Békés) ===
- Megyei Bajnokság I (level 4)
  - Winners (1): 2023–24

== Seasons ==
The table below shows the seasons of Gyulai Termál FC.

Season	Tier	Club's name	Position	Pts
1925–26	3	Gyulai TE	4 / 9	16
1926–27	3	Gyulai TE	1 / 5	13
1927–28	3	Gyulai TE	1 / 5	12
1928–29	2	Gyulai TE	5 / 10	18
1929–30	2	Gyulai TE	6 / 12	24
1930–31	2	Gyulai TE	4 / 12	24
1931–32	2	Gyulai TE	9 / 14	20
1932–33	2	Gyulai TE	8 / 14	23
1933–34	2	Gyulai TE	6 / 14	28
1934–35	2	Gyulai TE	8 / 14	23
1935–36	2	Gyulai TE	7 / 14	24
1936–37	2	Gyulai TE	9 / 13	20
1937–38	2	Gyulai TE	9 / 12	18
1938–39	3	Gyulai TE	7 / 12	20
1939–40	3	Gyulai TE	11 / 13	14
1940–41	4	Gyulai TE	7 / 12	21
1941–42	4	Gyulai TE	5 / 14	28
1942–43	4	Gyulai TE	2 / 14	33
1943–44	3	Gyulai TE	7 / 14	27
1944–45	2	Gyulai TE	14 / 14	0
1944–45	3	Gyulai TE	0 / 13	
1945	2	Gyulai TE	1 / 7	23
1945–46	2	Gyulai TE	1 / 17	51
1946–47	2	Gyulai TE	8 / 14	25
1947–48	2	Gyulai TE	14 / 14	14
1948–49	3	Gyulai SE	5 / 16	34
1949–50	3	Gyulai SzSE	1 / 16	46
1950	2	Gyulai SzSE	10 / 16	13
1951	2	Gyulai Építők	7 / 14	26
1952	2	Gyulai Építők	5 / 18	41
1953	2	Gyulai Építők	14 / 16	24
1954	2	Gyulai Építők	12 / 16	27
1955	3	Gyulai Traktor	3 / 16	40
1956	3	Gyulai Traktor	1 / 16	51
1957	2	Gyulai Hunyadi	4 / 6	9
1957–58	2	Gyulai MEDOSZ	12 / 19	33
1958–59	3	Gyulai MEDOSZ	10 / 16	29
1959–60	3	Gyulai MEDOSZ	3 / 17	35
1960–61	3	Gyulai MEDOSZ	2 / 16	39
1961–62	3	Gyulai MEDOSZ	4 / 16	38
1962–63	3	Gyulai Medosz	2 / 16	45
1963	3	Gyulai MEDOSZ	8 / 18	18
1964	3	Gyulai MEDOSZ SE	11 / 18	31
1965	3	Gyulai MEDOSZ	8 / 18	34
1966	3	Gyulai MEDOSZ SE	13 / 18	29
1967	3	Gyulai MEDOSZ	11 / 16	28
1968	3	Gyulai MEDOSZ	13 / 16	26
1969	3	Gyulai MEDOSZ SE	8 / 16	31
1970	3	Gyulai MEDOSZ	16 / 16	8
1970–71	3	Gyulai MEDOSZ SE	11 / 16	27
1971–72	3	Gyulai MEDOSZ	5 / 16	31
1972–73	3	Gyulai MEDOSZ	16 / 16	12
1973–74	4	Gyulai SE	2 / 16	42
1974–75	3	Gyulai SE	14 / 20	34
1975–76	3	Gyulai SE	8 / 20	41
1976–77	3	Gyulai SE	7 / 20	43
1977–78	3	Gyulai SE	10 / 20	41
1978–79	2	Gyulai SE	17 / 20	28
1979–80	2	Gyulai SE	11 / 20	37
1980–81	2	Gyulai SE	2 / 20	49
1981–82	2	Gyulai SE	7 / 16	31
1982–83	3	Gyulai SE	4 / 16	37
1983–84	3	Gyulai SE	3 / 16	41
1984–85	3	Gyulai SE	10 / 16	29
1985–86	3	Gyulai TE	4 / 16	35
1986–87	3	Gyulai SE	10 / 16	28
1987–88	3	Gyulai SE	5 / 16	35
1988–89	3	Gyulai SE	2 / 16	61
1989–90	3	Gyulai SE	11 / 16	39
1990–91	3	Gyulai SE	6 / 16	35
1991–92	3	Gyulai SE	5 / 16	32
1992–93	3	Gyulai FC	8 / 16	31
1993–94	3	Gyula FC	6 / 16	35
1994–95	3	Gyula FC	3 / 16	52
1995–96	3	Gyula-Kanton FC	5 / 16	56
1996–97	3	Gyula-Kanton FC	6 / 16	46
1997–98	4	Gyula-West Group FC	1 / 16	62
1998–99	3	Gyulai FC	6 / 16	39
1999–00	3	Gyula	6 / 16	45
2000	3	Gyula Termál FC	1 / 8	39
2000–01	3	Gyulai Termál FC	4 / 12	34
2001–02	3	Gyulai Termál FC	11 / 13	22
2002–03	3	Gyulai Termál FC	9 / 12	26
2002–03	3	Gyulai Termál FC	9 / 12	39
2003–04	3	Gyula	3 / 16	59
2004–05	3	Gyula	8 / 16	41
2005–06	3	Gyulai Termál FC	7 / 15	41
2006–07	3	Gyulai Termál FC	8 / 14	40
2007–08	3	Gyulai Termál FC	6 / 16	51
2008–09	3	Gyulai Termál FC	9 / 16	39
2009–10	3	Várfürdő-Gyulai TFC	12 / 14	26
2010–11	3	Várfürdő-Gyulai Termál FC	4 / 15	52
2011–12	3	Várfürdő-Gyulai Termál FC	3 / 16	53
2012–13	3	Várfürdő-Gyulai Termál FC	3 / 14	48
2013–14	3	Várfürdő-Gyulai Termál FC	7 / 16	42
2014–15	3	Várfürdő-Gyulai Termál FC	12 / 16	38
2015–16	3	Várfürdő-Gyulai Termál FC	13 / 17	36
2016–17	3	Várfürdő-Gyulai Termál FC	15 / 18	36
2017–18	4	Várfürdő-Gyulai Termál FC	7 / 12	37
2018–19	4	Várfürdő-Gyulai Termál FC	7 / 11	40
2019–20	4	Várfürdő-Gyulai Termál FC	5 / 8	25
2020–21	4	Clean Way - Gyulai TFC	4 / 12	45
2020–21	4	Clean Way-Gyulai Termál FC	1 / 8	33
2021–22	4	Gyulai Termál FC	2 / 12	61
2022–23	4	Gyulai Termál FC	4 / 10	35
2023–24	4	Gyulai Termál FC	1 / 10	76
2024–25	3	Gyulai Termál FC	2 / 16	64
2025–26	3	Gyulai Termál FC	3 / 16	65

== Managers ==
- (Romania) Iuliu Bodola (1959–1960)
- (Hungary) József Pásztor (2002–2005)
