= Stepan Voitko =

Association football player

Personal information
- Full name: Stepan Fedorovych Voitko
- Date of birth: 7 May 1947 (age 79)
- Place of birth: Uzhhorod, Ukrainian SSR, Soviet Union
- Position: Defender

Youth career
- Sports school Uzhhorod

Senior career*
Years	Team	Apps	(Gls)
1966	FC Verkhovyna Uzhhorod	32	(0)
1967–1968	FC Iskra Smolensk		
1969–1973	FC Hoverla Uzhhorod	126	(2)
1974–1975	FC Radvanka		

Managerial career
- 1974–1975: FC Radvanka
- Sports school Hoverla Uzhhorod
- 1983–1987: FC Zakarpattia Uzhhorod (ass't)
- 1991–1992: FC Zakarpattia Uzhhorod
- 1997: FC Karpaty Mukacheve
- 1997: FC Zakarpattia Uzhhorod
- 1997–1998: FC Zakarpattia Uzhhorod (team's chief)
- 1998–2009: Mátészalka FC
- 2010: SC Kolchyne
- * Club domestic league appearances and goals

Stepan Voitko (Ukrainian: Степан Федорович Войтко, Hungarian: Vojtkó István; 22 February 1947) is a former professional Soviet football defender and later Soviet and Ukrainian coach.
