= Bonyhád VLC =

Hungarian football club

Bonyhád
- Full name: Bonyhád Völgység Labdarúgó Club
- Founded: 1951
- Ground: Sport úti Pálya
- Capacity: 2,500
- Manager: György Sárai
- League: NB III; Southwest
- 2023–24: MB I Tolna, 1st of 8 (promoted)
Home colours

Bonyhád Völgység Labdarúgó Club is a football club based in Bonyhád, Tolna County, Hungary, that competes in the Nemzeti Bajnokság III – Southwest, the third tier of Hungarian football.

== Name changes ==
- Bonyhádi Vasas (1951 – 1957)
- Bonyhádi MSC (1957 – 1957)
- Bonyhádi Munkás TE (1957 – 1958)
- Bonyhádi Vasas (1958 – 1981)
- Bonyhádi Munkásszövetkezeti SC (1981 – 1985)
- in 1985 merger with Bonyhádi Pannónia SE
- Bonyhádi SE (1985 – 1996)
- Bonyhádi FC (1996 – 1998)
- Bonyhád Agraco FC (1998 – 2001)
- Bonyhád Völgység Labdarúgó Club (2001 – present)

== History ==
Bonyhád lost 3–2 to Monori SE in the 2020–21 Magyar Kupa season.

On 4 June 2024, the club gained automatic promotion to the 2024–25 Nemzeti Bajnokság III season.

== Honours ==
=== County Leagues (Tolna) ===
- Megyei Bajnokság I (level 4)
  - Winners (4): 1990–91, 2015–16, 2018–19, 2023–24
- Megyei Bajnokság II (level 5)
  - Winners (1): 1966

== Seasons ==
As of 18 October 2026.

Season	Tier	Club's name	Position	Pts
1945–46	3	Bonyhádi Testvériség TE	5 / 8	13
1947–48	4	Bonyhádi Testvériség TE	8 / 12	17
1948–49	4	Bonyhádi MTE	6 / 14	30
1949–50	4	Bonyhádi MTE	9 / 14	19
1950	4	Bonyhádi SzTK	2 / 15	22
1951	3	Bonyhádi Vasas	5 / 14	34
1952	3	Bonyhádi Vasas	5 / 14	32
1953	3	Bonyhádi Vasas	9 / 14	25
1954	3	Bonyhádi Vasas	3 / 14	34
1955	3	Bonyhádi Vasas	2 / 14	38
1956	3	Bonyhád	3 / 14	35
1957	3	Bonyhádi MSC	2 / 5	11
1957–58	3	Bonyhádi Munkás TE	7 / 16	31
1958–59	3	Bonyhádi Vasas SK	10 / 16	28
1959–60	3	Bonyhádi Vasas SK	10 / 17	30
1960–61	3	Bonyhádi Vasas	16 / 16	15
1961–62	4	Bonyhád	2 / 16	47
1962–63	4	Bonyhád	2 / 16	37
1963	5	Bonyhád	2 / 16	21
1964	5	Bonyhádi Vasas	2 / 16	49
1965	5	Bonyhádi Vasas	2 / 16	47
1966	5	Bonyhádi Vasas	1 / 17	59
1967	4	Bonyhádi Vasas	6 / 16	30
1968	4	Bonyhádi Vasas	9 / 16	30
1969	4	Bonyhádi Vasas	9 / 16	31
1970	4	Bonyhádi Vasas	3 / 16	18
1970–71	4	Bonyhádi Vasas	13 / 16	27
1971–72	4	Bonyhádi Vasas	14 / 16	23
1972–73	5	Bonyhád	4 / 16	38
1973–74	5	Bonyhádi Vasas	3 / 15	39
1974–75	4	Bonyhád	10 / 18	28
1975–76	4	Bonyhád	8 / 18	38
1976–77	4	Bonyhád	8 / 18	38
1977–78	4	Bonyhádi Vasas	5 / 18	47
1978–79	3	Bonyhád	13 / 16	22
1979–80	3	Bonyhád	6 / 16	39
1980–81	3	Bonyhádi MSC	2 / 16	44
1981–82	3	Bonyhádi MSC	8 / 16	30
1982–83	3	Bonyhádi MSC	10 / 16	29
1983–84	3	Bonyhádi MSC	4 / 16	35
1984–85	3	Bonyhádi MSC	5 / 16	33
1985–86	3	Bonyhádi MSC	5 / 16	33
1986–87	3	Bonyhádi MSC	11 / 16	29
1987–88	3	Bonyhádi MSC	13 / 16	24
1988–89	3	Bonyhádi SE	6 / 16	48
1989–90	3	Bonyhádi MSC	15 / 16	24
1990–91	4	Bonyhádi SE	1 / 16	53
1991–92	3	Bonyhádi MSC	8 / 16	31
1992–93	3	Bonyhádi SE	11 / 16	27
1993–94	3	Bonyhádi SE	9 / 16	30
1994–95	3	Bonyhádi SE	7 / 16	41
1995–96	3	Bonyhád	14 / 16	23
1996–97	3	Bonyhádi FC	11 / 16	32
1997–98	4	Bonyhád	16 / 16	13
1998–99	4	Bonyhád-Agraco FC	9 / 16	44
1999–00	4	Bonyhád Agraco FC	2 / 16	56
2000	3	Bonyhád Agraco	2 / 8	28
2000–01	3	Bonyhád-Agraco FC	9 / 12	26
2001–02	3	Bonyhád VLC	13 / 13	15
2002–03	4	Bonyhád VLC	15 / 16	18
2003–04	4	Bonyhád VLC	8 / 16	43
2004–05	4	Bonyhád VLC	10 / 15	35
2005–06	3	Bonyhád VLC	4 / 16	54
2006–07	3	Bonyhád VLC	7 / 14	33
2007–08	3	Bonyhád VLC	8 / 18	55
2008–09	3	Bonyhád VLC	13 / 16	28
2009–10	4	Bonyhád VLC	2 / 16	76
2010–11	3	Bonyhád VLC	11 / 16	39
2011–12	3	Bonyhád VLC	8 / 15	41
2012–13	3	Bonyhád VLC	8 / 14	40
2013–14	4	Bonyhád VLC	3 / 15	62
2014–15	4	Bonyhád Völgység LC	3 / 14	59
2015–16	4	Bonyhád Völgység LC	1 / 14	65
2016–17	4	Bonyhád Völgység LC	7 / 13	36
2017–18	4	Bonyhád Völgység LC	2 / 13	53
2018–19	4	Bonyhád Völgység LC	1 / 11	71
2019–20	4	Bonyhád Völgység LC	2 / 10	36
2020–21	4	Bonyhád Völgység LC	2 / 9	52
2021–22	4	Bonyhád Völgység LC	2 / 10	63
2022–23	4	Bonyhád Völgység LC	2 / 9	49
2023–24	4	Bonyhád Völgység LC	1 / 8	34
2023–24	4	Bonyhád Völgység LC	1 / 15	38
2024–25	3	Bonyhád Völgység LC	11 / 16	35
2025–26	4	Bonyhád Völgység LC	3 / 7	42
