= Dunaharaszti MTK =

Hungarian football club

- Full name: Dunaharaszti Munkás Testedző Kör
- Founded: 1920; 106 years ago
- Ground: DMTK Stadium
- Capacity: 1,196
- Manager: Márk Ughy
- League: NB III; Southwest
- 2023–24: MB I Pest, 1st of 16 (promoted)
- Website: https://www.dmtk.hu/
Home colours

Dunaharaszti Munkás Testedző Kör is a professional football club based in Dunaharaszti, Pest County, Hungary, that competes in the Nemzeti Bajnokság III – Southwest, the third tier of Hungarian football.

== History ==
Dunaharaszti MTK won the Alföld group of the 2011–12 Nemzeti Bajnokság III season; however, they did not gain promotion to the second division.

== Name changes ==
- 1920–36: Dunaharaszti Munkás Testedző Kör
- 1936–38: Dunaharaszti AC
- 1938–45: Dunaharaszti SC
- 1945–52: Dunaharaszti Munkás Testedző Kör
- 1952: merger with Csepel Autógyári Vasas
- 1959:
- 1959–present: Dunaharaszti Munkás Testedző Kör

== Honours ==
- Nemzeti Bajnokság III:
  - Winners (1): 2011–12

== Seasons ==
The table below shows the seasons of Dunaharaszti MTK.

Season	Tier	Club's name	Position	Pts
1919–20	2	Dunaharaszti MTK	8 / 9	
1920–21	2	Dunaharaszti MTK	3 / 6	
1921–22	2	Dunaharaszti MTK	0 / 9	
1922–23	3	Dunaharaszti MTK	0 / 10	
1923–24	3	Dunaharaszti MTK	1 / 8	23
1924–25	2	Dunaharaszti MTK	5 / 10	18
1925–26	2	Dunaharaszti MTK	9 / 10	5
1926–27	3	Dunaharaszti MTK	5 / 10	9
1927–28	3	Dunaharaszti MTK	6 / 6	4
1928–29	3	Dunaharaszti MTK	3 / 9	17
1929–30	3	Dunaharaszti MTK	1 / 9	21
1930–31	2	Dunaharaszti MTK	6 / 11	19
1931–32	2	Dunaharaszti MTK	4 / 10	19
1932–33	2	Dunaharaszti MTK	8 / 14	
1933–34	2	Dunaharaszti MTK	11 / 12	17
1934–35	3	Dunaharaszti MTK	2 / 12	34
1935–36	3	Dunaharaszti MTK	5 / 11	18
1936–37	3	Dunaharaszti AC	7 / 10	15
1937–38	3	Dunaharaszti AC	7 / 11	18
1938–39	4	Dunaharaszti SC	1 / 9	32
1939–40	3	Dunaharaszti SC	11 / 12	11
1940–41	5	Dunaharaszti SC	1 / 13	39
1945–46	2	Dunaharaszti MTK	9 / 12	14
1946–47	4	Dunaharaszti MTK	5 / 13	27
1947–48	4	Dunaharaszti MTK	4 / 14	
1948–49	4	Dunaharaszti MTK	10 / 16	26
1949–50	4	Dunaharaszti MTK	6 / 16	33
1950	4	Dunaharaszti MTK	10 / 13	9
1951	4	Dunaharaszti	1 / 10	
1959–60	5	Dunaharaszti MTK	1 / 13	41
1960–61	5	Dunaharaszti	1 / 10	29
1961–62	4	Dunaharaszti MTK	11 / 17	29
1962–63	4	Dunaharaszti MTK	14 / 16	22
1963	5	Dunaharaszti MTK	9 / 16	14
1964	5	Dunaharaszti MTK	9 / 16	28
1965	5	Dunaharaszti MTK	10 / 16	27
1966	5	Dunaharaszti MTK	8 / 16	32
1967	5	Dunaharaszti MTK	14 / 16	19
1968	6	Dunaharaszti MTK	4 / 14	31
1969	6	Dunaharaszti MTK	6 / 16	31
1970	6	Dunaharaszti MTK	1 / 8	20
1976–77	5	Dunaharaszti MTK	13 / 14	13
1977–78	5	Dunaharaszti	0 / 12	
1978–79	4	Dunaharaszti	0 / 10	
1979–80	4	Dunaharaszti MTK	6 / 16	32
1980–81	4	Dunaharaszti	4 / 14	30
1981–82	5	Dunaharaszti	11 / 14	24
1982–83	5	Dunaharaszti	11 / 14	14
1983–84	6	Dunaharaszti	0 / 9	
1984–85	6	Dunaharaszti	4 / 10	12
1985–86	6	Dunaharaszti MTK	3 / 11	17
1986–87	6	Dunaharaszti	6 / 12	24
1987–88	6	Dunaharaszti	2 / 12	35
1988–89	6	Dunaharaszti	8 / 12	10
1989–90	6	Dunaharaszti	4 / 9	10
1990–91	6	Dunaharaszti	3 / 9	26
1991–92	6	Dunaharaszti	3 / 11	10
1992–93	6	Dunaharaszti	1 / 10	32
1993–94	5	Dunaharaszti	4 / 16	32
1994–95	5	Dunaharaszti	11 / 16	27
1995–96	5	Dunaharaszti	12 / 16	37
1996–97	5	Dunaharaszti MTK	9 / 16	39
1997–98	6	Dunaharaszti	1 / 16	69
1998–99	5	Dunaharaszti	8 / 18	50
1999–00	5	Dunaharaszti	15 / 18	31
2000–01	5	Dunaharaszti	18 / 18	14
2001–02	6	Dunaharaszti	10 / 16	37
2002–03	6	Dunaharaszti	12 / 16	36
2003–04	6	Dunaharaszti	4 / 16	54
2004–05	6	Dunaharaszti	1 / 18	89
2005–06	4	Dunaharaszti MTK	5 / 16	53
2006–07	4	Dunaharaszti MTK	4 / 16	63
2007–08	4	Dunaharaszti MTK	1 / 16	85
2008–09	3	Dunaharaszti MTK	4 / 16	55
2009–10	3	Dunaharaszti MTK	2 / 14	54
2010–11	3	Dunaharaszti MTK	3 / 16	50
2011–12	3	Dunaharaszti MTK	1 / 16	64
2012–13	3	Dunaharaszti MTK	4 / 14	48
2013–14	3	Dunaharaszti MTK	6 / 16	44
2014–15	3	Dunaharaszti MTK	10 / 16	45
2015–16	3	Dunaharaszti MTK	7 / 17	45
2016–17	3	Dunaharaszti MTK	11 / 18	42
2017–18	3	Dunaharaszti MTK	11 / 16	33
2018–19	3	Dunaharaszti MTK	11 / 16	32
2019–20	3	Dunaharaszti MTK	15 / 16	11
2020–21	4	Dunaharaszti MTK	2 / 16	68
2021–22	7	Dunaharaszti MTK II.	1 / 9	44
2021–22	4	Dunaharaszti MTK	2 / 16	71
2022–23	4	Dunaharaszti MTK	2 / 16	60
2023–24	4	Dunaharaszti MTK	1 / 16	79
2024–25	3	Dunaharaszti MTK	10 / 16	38
2025–26	3	Dunaharaszti MTK	9 / 16	40
