= Szegedi VSE =

Association football club in Hungary

- Full name: Szegedi Vasutas Sport Egyesülete
- Founded: 1919
- Ground: Szegedi VSE Stadion
- Website: https://szvse.hu/
Home colours

Szegedi Vasutas Sport Egyesülete is a Hungarian football club from the town of Szeged.

== History ==
Szegedi Vasutasok Sport Egyesülete debuted in the 1941–42 season of the Hungarian League and finished fifteenth.

== Name Changes ==
- 1919–1941: Szegedi Vasutasok Sport Egyesülete
- 1941–1948: Tisza Vasutas SE
- 1948–1953: Szegedi Lokomotív SK
- 1953–1957: Szegedi Törekvés
- 1957–2007: Szegedi Vasutas SE
- 2007–2011: Szegedi VSE-Gyálarét
- 2011–present: Szegedi Vasutas SE

== Honours ==
- Nemzeti Bajnokság II:
  - Winners (3): 1940–41, 1942–43, 1957

== Seasons ==
The table below shows the seasons of Szegedi VSE.

Season	Tier	Club's name	Position	Pts
1919–20	2	Szegedi Vasutasok SE	9 / 10	6
1920–21	2	Szegedi Vasutasok SE	5 / 9	11
1921–22	2	Szegedi Vasutasok SE	5 / 8	10
1922–23	2	Szegedi Vasutasok SE	2 / 10	24
1923–24	2	Szegedi Vasutasok SE	1 / 8	25
1924–25	2	Szegedi Vasutasok SE	2 / 8	23
1925–26	2	Szegedi Vasutasok SE	2 / 10	23
1926–27	2	Szegedi Vasutasok SE	1 / 10	27
1927–28	2	Szegedi Vasutasok SE	4 / 10	21
1928–29	2	Szegedi Vasutasok SE	8 / 12	20
1929–30	2	Szegedi Vasutasok SE	4 / 12	25
1930–31	2	Szegedi Vasutasok SE	7 / 12	20
1931–32	2	Szegedi Vasutasok SE	11 / 14	21
1932–33	2	Szegedi VSE	11 / 14	21
1933–34	2	Szegedi VSE	8 / 15	29
1934–35	2	Szegedi VSE	10 / 14	22
1935–36	2	Szegedi Vasutasok SE	4 / 14	33
1936–37	2	Szegedi VSE	3 / 13	30
1937–38	2	Szegedi VSE	5 / 12	26
1938–39	3	Szegedi VSE	2 / 12	32
1939–40	3	Szegedi VSE	1 / 12	40
1940–41	2	Szegedi VSE	1 / 14	38
1941–42	1	Szegedi VSE	15 / 16	13
1942–43	2	Szegedi Vasutas SE	1 / 14	43
1943–44	1	Szegedi Tisza Vasutas SE	14 / 16	24
1944–45	2	Tisza Vasutas SE	4 / 16	6
1944–45	2	Tisza Vasutas SE	0 / 13	
1945	2	Tisza Vasutas SE	2 / 12	18
1945–46	2	Tisza VSE (Szeged)	1 / 14	49
1946–47	2	Tisza Vasutas SE (Szeged)	6 / 14	28
1947–48	2	Tisza VSE (Szeged)	7 / 14	27
1948–49	2	Szegedi Lokomotív	14 / 16	23
1949–50	2	Szegedi Lokomotív	8 / 16	28
1950	2	Szegedi Lokomotív	9 / 16	13
1951	2	Szegedi Lokomotív	10 / 14	23
1952	2	Szegedi Lokomotív	14 / 18	28
1953	2	Szegedi Lokomotív	13 / 16	25
1954	2	Szegedi Lokomotív	13 / 16	22
1955	3	Szegedi Törekvés	1 / 16	51
1956	3	Szegedi Törekvés	1 / 16	58
1957	2	Szegedi Vasutas SE	1 / 6	14
1957–58	2	Szegedi VSE	10 / 19	33
1958–59	2	Szegedi VSE	9 / 16	29
1959–60	2	Szegedi VSE	3 / 16	36
1960–61	2	Szegedi VSE	14 / 16	24
1961–62	3	Szegedi VSE	1 / 16	45
1962–63	2	Szegedi VSE	13 / 16	25
1963	3	Szegedi VSE	3 / 18	23
1964	3	Szegedi VSE	9 / 18	33
1965	3	Szegedi VSE	12 / 18	31
1966	3	Szegedi VSE	9 / 18	32
1967	3	Szegedi VSE	2 / 16	39
1968	3	Szegedi VSE	12 / 16	27
1969	3	Szegedi VSE	10 / 16	30
1970	3	Szegedi VSE	6 / 16	17
1970–71	3	Szegedi VSE	10 / 16	28
1971–72	3	Szegedi VSE	10 / 16	28
1972–73	3	Szegedi VSE	5 / 16	35
1973–74	3	Szegedi VSE	6 / 16	30
1974–75	3	Szegedi VSE	6 / 20	41
1975–76	3	Szegedi VSE	10 / 20	39
1976–77	3	Szegedi VSE	17 / 20	27
1977–78	3	Szegedi VSE	19 / 20	22
1978–79	3	Szegedi VSE	2 / 16	44
1979–80	3	Szegedi VSE	2 / 16	45
1980–81	3	Szegedi VSE	5 / 16	40
1981–82	4	Szegedi VSE	1 / 14	44
1982–83	3	Szegedi VSE	8 / 16	26
1983–84	3	Szegedi VSE	11 / 16	24
1984–85	3	Szegedi VSE	13 / 16	26
1985–86	3	Szegedi VSE	11 / 16	26
1986–87	3	Szegedi VSE	14 / 16	24
1987–88	4	Szegedi VSE	1 / 16	51
1988–89	3	Szegedi VSE	16 / 16	29
1989–90	4	Szegedi VSE	5 / 16	49
1990–91	4	Szegedi VSE	2 / 16	44
1991–92	4	Szegedi VSE	1 / 16	51
1992–93	3	Szegedi VSE	7 / 16	33
1993–94	3	Szegedi VSE	5 / 16	35
1994–95	3	Szegedi VSE	4 / 16	51
1995–96	3	Szegedi VSE	9 / 16	42
1996–97	3	Szegedi VSE	14 / 16	7
1997–98	4	Szegedi VSE	16 / 16	19
1998–99	5	Szegedi VSE	15 / 18	30
1999–00	5	Szegedi VSE	3 / 16	56
2000–01	5	Szegedi VSE	6 / 16	40
2001–02	5	Szegedi VSE	15 / 16	22
2002–03	5	Szegedi VSE	7 / 16	44
2003–04	5	Szegedi VSE	4 / 16	58
2004–05	5	Szegedi VSE	6 / 16	45
2005–06	4	Szegedi VSE	7 / 18	52
2006–07	4	Szegedi VSE	11 / 16	35
2007–08	4	Szegedi VSE	11 / 16	35
2008–09	4	Szegedi VSE-Gyálarét	9 / 16	38
2009–10	4	Szegedi VSE-Gyálarét	5 / 16	50
2010–11	4	Szegedi VSE	6 / 16	51
2011–12	4	Szegedi VSE	7 / 17	42
2012–13	4	Szegedi VSE	8 / 16	43
2013–14	4	Szegedi VSE	13 / 16	24
2014–15	4	Szegedi VSE	13 / 16	25
2015–16	4	Szegedi VSE	13 / 17	28
2016–17	4	Szegedi VSE	10 / 15	33
2017–18	4	Szegedi VSE	5 / 15	51
2018–19	4	Szegedi VSE	3 / 15	64
2019–20	4	Szegedi VSE	1 / 14	40
2020–21	3	Szegedi VSE	19 / 20	24
2021–22	4	Szegedi VSE-Pizzamonster	1 / 14	68
2022–23	4	Szegedi VSE-G-Flack Kft.	2 / 12	70
2023–24	4	Szegedi VSE-G-Flack Kft.	1 / 12	79
2024–25	3	Szegedi VSE-G-Flack Kft.	6 / 16	43
2025–26	3	Szegedi VSE-G-Flack Kft.	11 / 16	35
