= Tiszaföldvár SE =

Hungarian football club

- Full name: Tiszaföldvári Sport Egyesület
- Founded: 1910; 115 years ago
- League: NB III; Southeast
- 2023–24: MB I Jász-Nagykun-Szolnok, 1st of 16 (promoted via play-offs)
Home colours

Tiszaföldvári Sport Egyesület is a professional football club based in Tiszaföldvár, Hungary, that competes in the Megyei Bajnokság I, the fourth tier of Hungarian football.
