= DEAC Stadion =

Sports campus in Debrecen, Hungary

Dóczy József utcai DEAC SportCampus
- Interactive map of Dóczy József utcai DEAC SportCampus
- Location: Debrecen, Hungary
- Coordinates: 47°33′21″N 21°37′1″E
- Owner: University of Debrecen
- Capacity: 1,500

Construction
- Opened: 1926
- Renovated: 2020

Tenants
- Debreceni EAC; Debreceni VSC II

DEAC SportCampus is a sports campus in Debrecen, Hungary. The center football field is home to the association football side Debreceni EAC and Debreceni VSC II. The stadium has a capacity of 1,500.
