= Mátészalkai MTK =

Hungarian football club

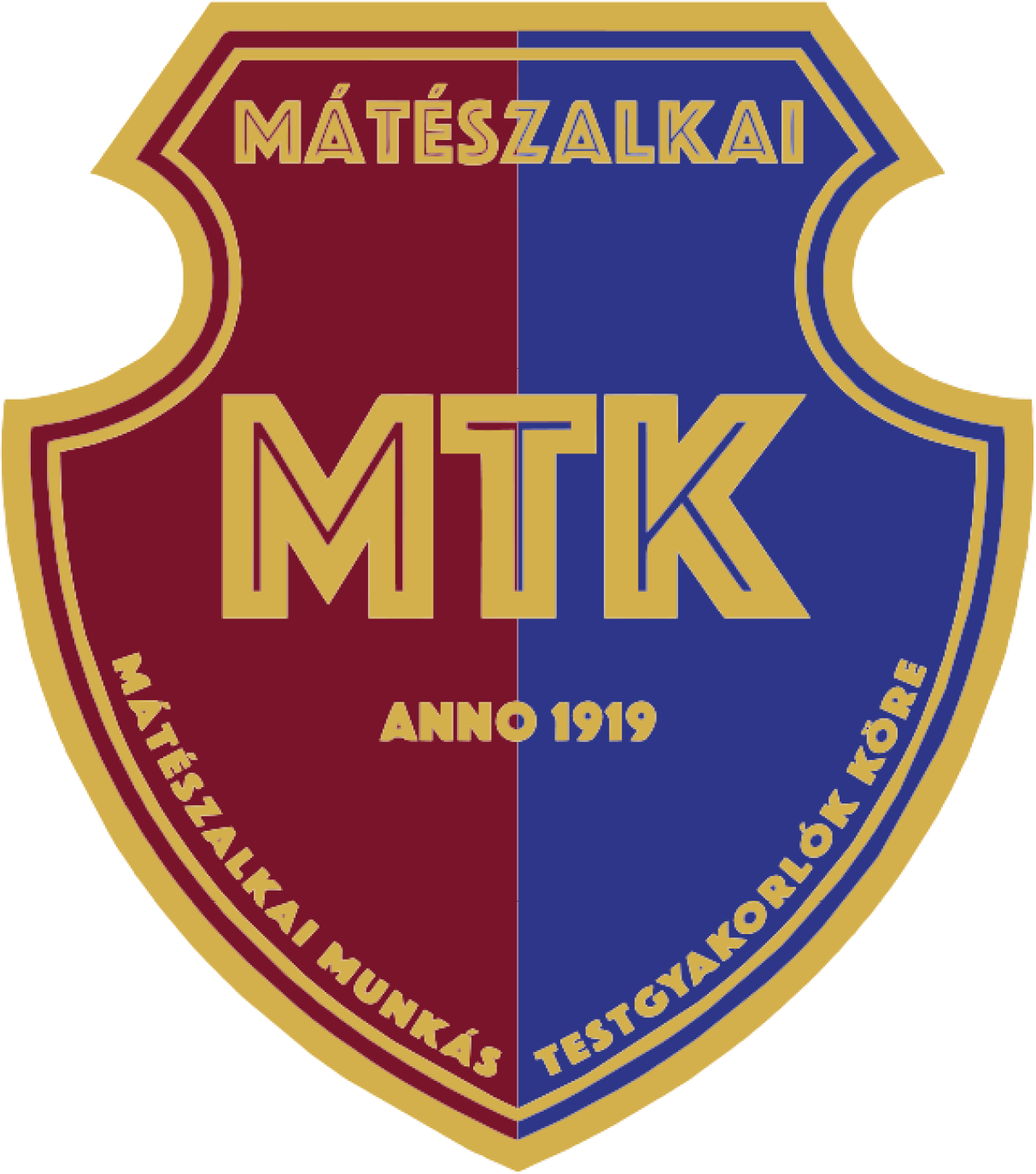
- Logo from 2021
- Full name: Group of Working Physical Exercisers in Mátészalka
- Founded: 1919
- Ground: MTK Stadion, Mátészalka
- Capacity: 2,000
- Chairman: Tamás Attila Torma
- Manager: Tamás Sándor
- League: NB III; Northeast
- 2023–24: MB I Szabolcs-Szatmár-Bereg, 2nd of 16 (promoted via play-offs)
- Website: https://www.mateszalkafoci.hu/
Home colours	Away colours

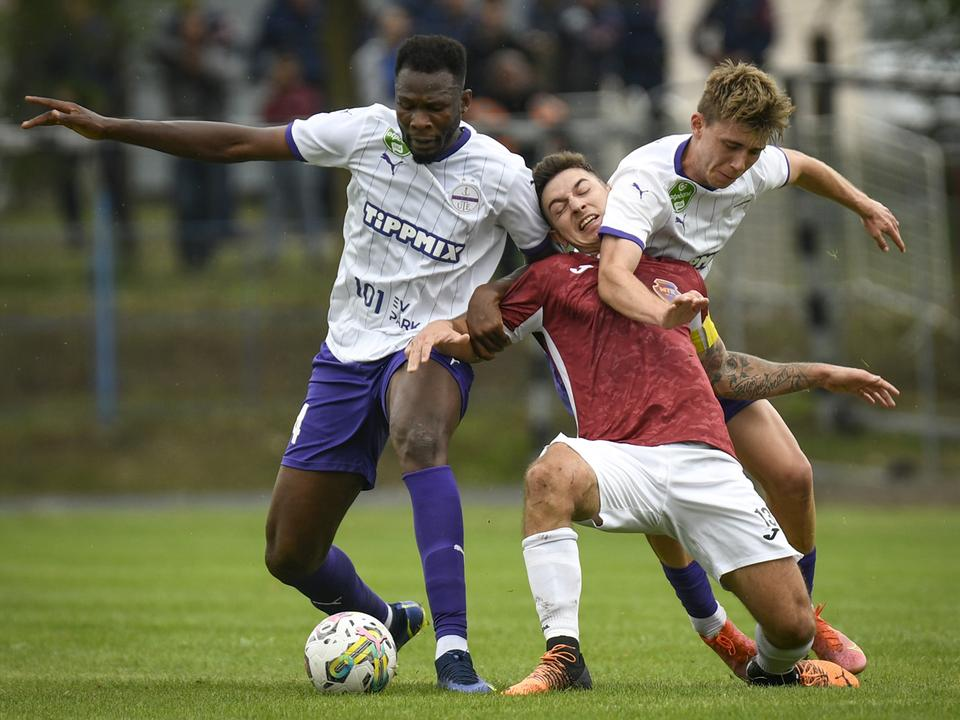
Újpest FC against Mátészalka

Mátészalkai MTK (MMTK) is a Hungarian football club based in Mátészalka. Established in 1919, it currently plays in the Nemzeti Bajnokság III – Northeast, the third tier of Hungarian football. The highest division they played was in Nemzeti Bajnokság II, second tier in 1940, 1947–1950, and 2000–2005. They play their home games at MTK Stadion.

== Previous names ==
The club was also known as Mátészalka TK, Mátészalkai DTK, Mátészalkai Építők, Mátészalkai Spartacus, Mátszalkai MEDOSZ and Mátészalka FC.

== See also ==
- Stepan Voitko
