= Debreceni EAC (football) =

Hungarian football club

- Full name: Debreceni Egyetemi Atlétikai Club
- Founded: 1919; 107 years ago
- Ground: DEAC Stadion
- Capacity: 3,200
- Manager: Péter Urbin
- League: NB III; Northeast
- 2024–25: NB III; Northeast, 2nd of 16
- Website: https://labdarugas.deac.hu/
Home colours	Away colours

Debreceni Egyetemi Atlétikai Club is a professional sport club based in Debrecen, Hajdú–Bihar County, Hungary, that competes in the Nemzeti Bajnokság III – Northeast, the third tier of Hungarian football.

== History ==
Debreceni EAC competed in the 2019–20 Nemzeti Bajnokság III.

On 3 July 2019, Elemér Kondás was appointed as the manager of the club.

On 3 December 2019, Kondás resigned because he received an offer from Győri ETO FC

On 15 January 2020, László Schőn was appointed as the manager of the club.

The 2019-20 Nemzeti Bajnokság III was terminated in May 2020 due to the COVID-19 pandemic. The club was positioned in the first place thus gaining promotion to the Nemzeti Bajnokság II. On 6 May 2020, it was announced that the club would play in the 2020-21 Nemzeti Bajnokság II.

On 8 May 2020, it was announced that the club could play their home matches at the Debreceni VSC's Nagyerdei Stadion.

In the 2026–27 Magyar Kupa, DEAC hosted Ferencvárosi TC in the round of 64. The match ended with a 7-0 victory for Ferencváros.

== Naming history ==
- 1919 – 1948: Debreceni Egyetemi Athletikai Club
- 1948 – merger with Debreceni ASE
- 1948 – 1949: Debreceni MEFESz SE
- 1949 – 1951: Debreceni Egyetemi SE
- 1951 – 1957: Debreceni Haladás SK
- 1957 – ?: Debreceni Egyetemi Atlétikai Club
- 1979: merger with Debreceni ASE
- 1979 – 1989: Debreceni Universitas SE
- 1991 – present: Debreceni Egyetemi Atlétikai Club

== Current squad ==
As of 30 January 2026

Note: Flags indicate national team as defined under FIFA eligibility rules; some limited exceptions apply. Players may hold more than one non-FIFA nationality.

No.	Pos.	Nation	Player
1	GK	HUN	Dániel Tóth I
4	DF	HUN	Marcell Grecskó
6	DF	HUN	Alex Herczku
7	FW	NGR	Oliver Tochukwu
8	MF	HUN	Márk Kónya
9	MF	HUN	Tamás Sándor
10	MF	HUN	Benedek Papp G.
11	FW	HUN	Dániel Tóth II
12	GK	HUN	Roland Ratku
16	MF	HUN	Zsolt Kelemen
17	FW	HUN	Kristóf Tar
20	FW	HUN	Attila Nagy
22	DF	HUN	Ákos Vincze
23	MF	YEM	Rauf El-Mohamed

No.	Pos.	Nation	Player
24	MF	HUN	János Soltész
25	DF	HUN	Zsolt Juhász
27	DF	HUN	Iván Jankelic
29	DF	HUN	Benjámin Lakatos
55	DF	HUN	Gábor Lénárt
58	DF	HUN	Ádám Ujvárosi
66	FW	HUN	Kornél Kovács
67	FW	HUN	Ákos Kun
77	FW	HUN	Gergő Lénárt
87	FW	HUN	Vince Fekete
88	MF	HUN	Patrik Tomola
99	MF	HUN	László Török
—	GK	HUN	Máté Kovács

== Honours ==
=== League ===
- Nemzeti Bajnokság III:
  - Winners (4): 1960–61, 1985–86, 2007–08, 2019–20

== Seasons ==
As of 20 October 2026.

Season	Tier	Club's name	Position	Pts
1919–20	2	Debreceni Egyetemi AC	5 / 6	
1920–21	2	Debreceni Egyetemi AC	4 / 10	20
1921–22	2	Debreceni Egyetemi AC	2 / 8	
1922–23	2	Debreceni Egyetemi AC	3 / 9	21
1923–24	2	Debreceni Egyetemi AC	6 / 9	12
1924–25	2	Debreceni Egyetemi AC	6 / 9	13
1925–26	2	Debreceni Egyetemi AC	4 / 8	14
1926–27	2	Debreceni Egyetemi AC	7 / 9	11
1927–28	2	Debreceni EAC	6 / 10	18
1928–29	2	Debreceni Egyetemi AC	6 / 11	18
1929–30	2	Debreceni Egyetemi AC	4 / 11	21
1930–31	2	Debreceni EAC	6 / 14	31
1931–32	2	Debreceni Egyetemi AC	3 / 12	31
1932–33	2	Debreceni EAC	8 / 13	20
1933–34	2	Debreceni EAC	8 / 12	20
1934–35	2	Debreceni Egyetemi AC	5 / 13	30
1935–36	2	Debreceni EAC	7 / 14	29
1936–37	2	Debreceni EAC	11 / 14	15
1937–38	2	Debreceni EAC	9 / 14	20
1938–39	3	Debreceni EAC	7 / 13	26
1939–40	3	Debreceni EAC	4 / 11	26
1940–41	4	Debreceni EAC	4 / 10	21
1941–42	4	Debreceni EAC	4 / 11	21
1942–43	4	Debreceni EAC	4 / 12	
1943–44	4	Debreceni EAC	11 / 12	10
1947–48	4	Debreceni Egyetemi AC	3 / 12	29
1948–49	4	Debreceni MEFESz SE	2 / 16	41
1949–50	4	Debreceni Egyetemi SE	16 / 16	17
1950	4	Debreceni Egyetemi SE	6 / 14	12
1951	3	Debreceni Haladás	10 / 14	25
1952	3	Debreceni Haladás	10 / 14	20
1953	3	Debreceni Haladás	5 / 12	24
1954	3	Debreceni Haladás	4 / 16	36
1955	3	Debreceni Haladás	2 / 16	44
1956	3	Debreceni Haladás	4 / 16	39
1957	3	Debreceni Egyetemi AC	2 / 6	14
1957–58	3	Debreceni Egyetemi AC	6 / 16	31
1958–59	3	Debreceni EAC	3 / 16	38
1959–60	3	Debreceni Egyetemi AC	3 / 17	36
1960–61	3	Debreceni EAC	1 / 16	47
1961–62	2	Debreceni EAC	8 / 16	30
1962–63	2	Debreceni EAC	16 / 16	22
1963	4	Debreceni EAC	2 / 16	20
1964	4	Debreceni EAC	8 / 16	31
1965	4	Debreceni EAC	8 / 16	30
1966	4	Debreceni EAC	14 / 16	23
1967	4	Debreceni EAC	2 / 16	38
1968	4	Debreceni EAC	4 / 16	33
1969	4	Debreceni EAC	1 / 16	43
1970	3	Debreceni EAC	9 / 16	14
1970–71	3	Debreceni EAC	6 / 16	31
1971–72	3	Debreceni EAC	6 / 16	29
1972–73	3	Debreceni EAC	9 / 16	28
1973–74	3	Debreceni EAC	5 / 16	33
1974–75	3	Debreceni EAC	20 / 20	17
1975–76	4	Debreceni EAC	5 / 17	40
1976–77	4	Debreceni EAC	10 / 18	31
1977–78	4	Debreceni EAC	5 / 18	42
1978–79	3	Debreceni EAC	10 / 18	34
1979–80	2	Debreceni Universitas SE	4 / 20	42
1980–81	2	Debreceni Universitas SE	4 / 20	44
1981–82	2	Debreceni Universitas SE	13 / 16	25
1982–83	3	Debreceni Universitas SE	2 / 16	40
1983–84	3	Debreceni Universitas SE	5 / 16	34
1984–85	3	Debreceni Universitas SE	2 / 16	46
1985–86	3	Debreceni Universitas SE	1 / 16	48
1986–87	3	Debreceni Universitas SE	4 / 16	37
1987–88	3	Debreceni Universitas SE	2 / 16	44
1988–89	2	Debreceni Universitas SE	12 / 16	42
1989–90	5	KLTE DSK	4 / 11	21
1990–91	5	KLTE DSK	1 / 14	46
1991–92	4	Debreceni EAC	12 / 16	26
1992–93	4	Debreceni EAC	13 / 16	25
1993–94	4	Debreceni EAC	6 / 18	42
1994–95	4	Debreceni EAC	2 / 17	63
1995–96	4	Debreceni EAC	1 / 16	69
1996–97	4	Debreceni EAC	9 / 18	45
1997–98	5	Debreceni EAC	12 / 16	32
1998–99	5	Debreceni EAC	6 / 16	46
1999–00	5	Debreceni EAC	2 / 16	63
2000–01	5	Debreceni EAC	7 / 18	56
2001–02	5	Debreceni EAC	13 / 16	21
2002–03	5	Debreceni EAC	11 / 16	31
2003–04	5	Debreceni EAC	5 / 16	57
2004–05	5	Debreceni EAC	3 / 16	64
2005–06	4	Debreceni EAC-Szertár Sportbolt	3 / 16	61
2006–07	4	Debreceni EAC-Szertár Sportbolt	2 / 16	74
2007–08	4	Debreceni EAC	3 / 18	66
2008–09	4	Debreceni EAC-Szertár Sportbolt	5 / 18	62
2009–10	4	Debreceni EAC-Szertár Sportbolt	4 / 16	55
2010–11	4	Debreceni EAC-Szertár Sportbolt	1 / 16	72
2011–12	3	Debreceni EAC-Szertár Sportbolt	9 / 16	46
2012–13	3	Debreceni EAC-Szertár Sportbolt	13 / 14	13
2013–14	4	Debreceni EAC Szertár Sportbolt	5 / 16	54
2014–15	4	Debreceni EAC	2 / 16	67
2015–16	4	Debreceni EAC	11 / 16	33
2016–17	4	Debreceni EAC	1 / 16	71
2017–18	3	Debreceni EAC	11 / 16	34
2018–19	3	Debreceni Egyetemi AC	9 / 16	44
2019–20	3	Debreceni Egyetemi AC	1 / 16	38
2020–21	2	Debreceni Egyetemi AC	20 / 20	23
2021–22	3	Debreceni Egyetemi AC	2 / 20	83
2022–23	3	Debreceni Egyetemi AC	3 / 20	67
2023–24	3	Debreceni Egyetemi AC	5 / 16	49
2024–25	3	Debreceni Egyetemi AC	2 / 16	67
2025–26	3	Debreceni Egyetemi AC	3 / 16	61

== Managers ==
- (Hungary) Elemér Kondás (3 July 2019 – 3 December 2019)
- (Hungary) László Schőn (15 January 2020 – present)
