= Christián László Municipal Sports Complex =

Stadium in Gyula, Hungary

- Location: Gyula, Hungary, Zrínyi Miklós tér 2, 5700 Hungary
- Coordinates: 46°38′16″N 21°15′49″E

Christián László Municipal Sports Complex is a municipal sports complex in Gyula, Hungary. It consists of 13 hectares of sports facilities, which includes the Himer Center field with an athletics track and a football pitch surrounded by a motorcycle speedway track. In addition, there are two more full size football pitches, tennis courts, basketball and skateboarding facilities.

== History ==
=== Speedway ===
The speedway arena has been a significant venue for motorcycle speedway and hosted important events, including qualifying rounds of the Speedway World Championship (starting in 1987) and a qualifying round of the Speedway World Team Cup in 2004.

It also held a round of the 2008 Individual Speedway European Championship.

=== Football ===
In 2023, the Himer center field underwent a complete renovation.
