= 2020–21 Megyei Bajnokság I =

Megyei Bajnokság I
- Season: 2020–21

The 2020–21 Megyei Bajnokság I includes the championships of 20 counties in Hungary. It is the fourth tier of the Hungarian football league system.

== Tables ==
=== Bács-Kiskun ===
| Pos | Team | Pld | W | D | L | GF | GA | GD | Pts | Promotion or relegation |
|---|---|---|---|---|---|---|---|---|---|---|
| 1 | Jánoshalma (C, O) | 28 | 21 | 4 | 3 | 70 | 24 | +46 | 67 | Qualification for promotion play-offs |
| 2 | Kiskunfélegyháza | 28 | 19 | 4 | 5 | 61 | 29 | +32 | 61 | |
| 3 | Kalocsa | 28 | 17 | 4 | 7 | 61 | 34 | +27 | 55 | |
| 4 | Kiskőrös | 28 | 15 | 5 | 8 | 71 | 40 | +31 | 50 | |
| 5 | Kecel | 28 | 13 | 6 | 9 | 43 | 43 | 0 | 45 | |
| 6 | Szabadszállás (R) | 28 | 12 | 6 | 10 | 71 | 54 | +17 | 42 | Relegation to Megyei Bajnokság III |
| 7 | Bácsalmás | 28 | 11 | 9 | 8 | 54 | 54 | 0 | 42 | |
| 8 | Tiszakécske II | 28 | 14 | 4 | 10 | 71 | 61 | +10 | 41 (Note: Tiszakécske II were deducted 5 points) | |
| 9 | Harta | 28 | 12 | 5 | 11 | 62 | 57 | +5 | 41 | |
| 10 | Kecskeméti LC | 28 | 12 | 5 | 11 | 45 | 44 | +1 | 41 | |
| 11 | Akasztó | 28 | 8 | 5 | 15 | 43 | 54 | −11 | 29 | |
| 12 | Kerekegyháza (R) | 28 | 6 | 7 | 15 | 49 | 72 | −23 | 25 | Relegation to Megyei Bajnokság II |
| 13 | Lajosmizse | 28 | 6 | 6 | 16 | 33 | 58 | −25 | 24 | |
| 14 | Soltvadkert | 28 | 2 | 6 | 20 | 31 | 80 | −49 | 12 | |
| 15 | Kiskunhalas | 28 | 2 | 4 | 22 | 21 | 82 | −61 | 10 | |

Source: Hungarian Football Federation
(C) Champions; (O) Play-off winners; (R) Relegated

=== Baranya ===
| Pos | Team | Pld | W | D | L | GF | GA | GD | Pts | Promotion or relegation |
|---|---|---|---|---|---|---|---|---|---|---|
| 1 | Mohács (C, P) | 28 | 25 | 2 | 1 | 80 | 9 | +71 | 77 | Qualification for promotion play-offs |
| 2 | Pécsvárad | 28 | 19 | 4 | 5 | 111 | 20 | +91 | 61 | |
| 3 | Villány | 28 | 19 | 4 | 5 | 83 | 30 | +53 | 61 | |
| 4 | Pécsi VSK | 28 | 18 | 2 | 8 | 81 | 47 | +34 | 56 | |
| 5 | Szentlőrinc II | 28 | 16 | 8 | 4 | 76 | 30 | +46 | 56 | |
| 6 | PTE-PEAC | 28 | 15 | 5 | 8 | 76 | 39 | +37 | 50 | |
| 7 | Boda | 28 | 11 | 5 | 12 | 48 | 58 | −10 | 38 | |
| 8 | Bóly | 28 | 11 | 3 | 14 | 58 | 63 | −5 | 36 | |
| 9 | Siklós | 28 | 11 | 3 | 14 | 41 | 59 | −18 | 36 | |
| 10 | Lovászhetény | 28 | 10 | 6 | 12 | 63 | 50 | +13 | 36 | |
| 11 | Komló | 28 | 7 | 12 | 9 | 56 | 51 | +5 | 33 | |
| 12 | Sellye | 28 | 8 | 2 | 18 | 54 | 63 | −9 | 26 | |
| 13 | Szederkény | 28 | 4 | 5 | 19 | 37 | 86 | −49 | 17 | |
| 14 | Harkány | 28 | 3 | 1 | 24 | 14 | 123 | −109 | 10 | |
| 15 | Kétújfalu | 28 | 2 | 0 | 26 | 22 | 172 | −150 | 6 | |

Source: Hungarian Football Federation
(C) Champions; (P) Promoted

=== Békés ===
| Pos | Team | Pld | W | D | L | GF | GA | GD | Pts | Promotion or relegation |
|---|---|---|---|---|---|---|---|---|---|---|
| 1 | Békéscsaba 1912 Előre II (C, O, P) | 22 | 19 | 1 | 2 | 112 | 21 | +91 | 58 | Qualification for promotion play-offs |
| 2 | Szarvas | 22 | 17 | 2 | 3 | 83 | 30 | +53 | 53 | |
| 3 | Szeghalom | 22 | 16 | 3 | 3 | 66 | 33 | +33 | 51 | |
| 4 | Gyula | 22 | 15 | 0 | 7 | 59 | 28 | +31 | 45 | |
| 5 | OMTK-ULE | 22 | 11 | 4 | 7 | 62 | 55 | +7 | 37 | |
| 6 | Jamina | 22 | 10 | 3 | 9 | 47 | 46 | +1 | 33 | |
| 7 | Nagyszénás | 22 | 7 | 7 | 8 | 32 | 40 | −8 | 28 | |
| 8 | Békéscsabai MÁV (R) | 22 | 6 | 3 | 13 | 25 | 44 | −19 | 21 | Relegation to Megyei Bajnokság II |
| 9 | Mezőkovácsháza (R) | 22 | 6 | 2 | 14 | 41 | 88 | −47 | 20 | Relegation to Megyei Bajnokság II |
| 10 | Mezőhegyes (R) | 22 | 2 | 5 | 15 | 29 | 61 | −32 | 11 | Relegation to Megyei Bajnokság II |
| 11 | Csabacsűd | 22 | 0 | 9 | 13 | 26 | 69 | −43 | 9 | |
| 12 | Dévaványa (R) | 22 | 1 | 5 | 16 | 14 | 81 | −67 | 8 | Relegation to Megyei Bajnokság II |

Source: Hungarian Football Federation
(C) Champions; (O) Play-off winners; (P) Promoted; (R) Relegated

=== Borsod-Abaúj-Zemplén ===
| Pos | Team | Pld | W | D | L | GF | GA | GD | Pts | Promotion or relegation |
|---|---|---|---|---|---|---|---|---|---|---|
| 1 | Hidasnémeti (C, P) | 29 | 24 | 2 | 3 | 79 | 16 | +63 | 74 | Qualification for promotion play-offs |
| 2 | Felsőzsolca | 30 | 23 | 4 | 3 | 100 | 24 | +76 | 73 | |
| 3 | Gesztely | 30 | 22 | 2 | 6 | 74 | 31 | +43 | 68 | |
| 4 | Bőcs | 30 | 21 | 4 | 5 | 96 | 56 | +40 | 67 | |
| 5 | Cigánd | 30 | 17 | 7 | 6 | 77 | 36 | +41 | 58 | |
| 6 | Edelény | 30 | 17 | 4 | 9 | 60 | 43 | +17 | 55 | |
| 7 | Encs | 30 | 15 | 3 | 12 | 67 | 56 | +11 | 48 | |
| 8 | Bánhorváti | 30 | 15 | 2 | 13 | 83 | 57 | +26 | 47 | |
| 9 | Miskolc | 30 | 15 | 0 | 15 | 79 | 68 | +11 | 45 | |
| 10 | Aszaló | 30 | 13 | 2 | 15 | 68 | 85 | −17 | 41 | |
| 11 | Mezőkeresztes | 29 | 9 | 3 | 17 | 48 | 59 | −11 | 30 | |
| 12 | Emőd | 30 | 9 | 3 | 18 | 42 | 74 | −32 | 30 | |
| 13 | Nyékládháza (R) | 30 | 7 | 2 | 21 | 52 | 106 | −54 | 23 | Relegation to Megyei Bajnokság II |
| 14 | Abaújszántó (R) | 30 | 6 | 1 | 23 | 43 | 90 | −47 | 19 | Relegation and not competed in any division next season |
| 15 | Mád (R) | 30 | 3 | 1 | 26 | 27 | 110 | −83 | 10 | Relegation to Megyei Bajnokság II |
| 16 | Sárospatak (R) | 30 | 3 | 0 | 27 | 32 | 116 | −84 | 9 | Relegation to Megyei Bajnokság II |

Source: Hungarian Football Federation
(C) Champions; (P) Promoted; (R) Relegated

=== Budapest ===
| Pos | Team | Pld | W | D | L | GF | GA | GD | Pts | Promotion or relegation |
|---|---|---|---|---|---|---|---|---|---|---|
| 1 | Kelen (C, P) | 30 | 24 | 3 | 3 | 94 | 22 | +72 | 75 | Qualification for promotion play-offs |
| 2 | Csepel | 30 | 24 | 2 | 4 | 77 | 21 | +56 | 74 | |
| 3 | Rákospalota | 30 | 18 | 9 | 3 | 71 | 31 | +40 | 63 | |
| 4 | Pénzügyőr | 30 | 16 | 7 | 7 | 61 | 38 | +23 | 55 | |
| 5 | Fővárosi Vízművek | 30 | 16 | 6 | 8 | 83 | 48 | +35 | 54 | |
| 6 | Unione | 30 | 15 | 7 | 8 | 71 | 50 | +21 | 52 | |
| 7 | Testvériség | 30 | 13 | 7 | 10 | 52 | 37 | +15 | 46 | |
| 8 | 43. Sz. Építők | 30 | 10 | 9 | 11 | 40 | 40 | 0 | 39 | |
| 9 | Budafok II | 30 | 11 | 3 | 16 | 56 | 59 | −3 | 36 | |
| 10 | SZAC | 30 | 10 | 6 | 14 | 34 | 49 | −15 | 36 | |
| 11 | Svábhegy | 30 | 9 | 7 | 14 | 44 | 52 | −8 | 34 | |
| 12 | Gázgyár | 30 | 9 | 7 | 14 | 34 | 43 | −9 | 34 | |
| 13 | Csep-Gól | 30 | 7 | 7 | 16 | 27 | 58 | −31 | 28 | |
| 14 | Ikarus | 30 | 4 | 7 | 19 | 33 | 73 | −40 | 19 | |
| 15 | RAFC (R) | 30 | 3 | 8 | 19 | 32 | 89 | −57 | 17 | Relegation to Megyei Bajnokság II |
| 16 | Közterület (R) | 30 | 3 | 1 | 26 | 23 | 122 | −99 | 10 | Relegation to Megyei Bajnokság II |

Source: Hungarian Football Federation
(C) Champions; (P) Promoted; (R) Relegated

=== Csongrád ===
| Pos | Team | Pld | W | D | L | GF | GA | GD | Pts | Promotion or relegation |
|---|---|---|---|---|---|---|---|---|---|---|
| 1 | Makó (C, P) | 26 | 24 | 1 | 1 | 126 | 7 | +119 | 73 | Qualification for promotion play-offs |
| 2 | Tiszasziget | 26 | 17 | 5 | 4 | 67 | 23 | +44 | 56 | |
| 3 | Szentes | 26 | 17 | 3 | 6 | 61 | 33 | +28 | 54 | |
| 4 | Apátfalva | 26 | 15 | 3 | 8 | 75 | 58 | +17 | 48 | |
| 5 | Algyő | 26 | 13 | 4 | 9 | 47 | 32 | +15 | 43 | |
| 6 | Mórahalom | 26 | 12 | 3 | 11 | 52 | 48 | +4 | 39 | |
| 7 | Szeged 2011 II | 26 | 11 | 3 | 12 | 59 | 45 | +14 | 36 | |
| 8 | Hódmezővásárhely II | 26 | 11 | 1 | 14 | 56 | 64 | −8 | 34 | |
| 9 | Bordány | 26 | 10 | 4 | 12 | 33 | 42 | −9 | 34 | |
| 10 | DAFC Szeged | 26 | 9 | 4 | 13 | 46 | 65 | −19 | 31 | |
| 11 | Kiskundorozsma | 26 | 6 | 11 | 9 | 41 | 39 | +2 | 29 | |
| 12 | Csongrád (R) | 26 | 5 | 4 | 17 | 35 | 72 | −37 | 19 | Relegation to Megyei Bajnokság III |
| 13 | Székkutas (R) | 26 | 5 | 2 | 19 | 31 | 107 | −76 | 17 | Relegation to Megyei Bajnokság II |
| 14 | Újszeged | 26 | 1 | 4 | 21 | 21 | 115 | −94 | 7 | |

Source: Hungarian Football Federation
(C) Champions; (P) Promoted; (R) Relegated

=== Fejér ===
| Pos | Team | Pld | W | D | L | GF | GA | GD | Pts | Promotion or relegation |
|---|---|---|---|---|---|---|---|---|---|---|
| 1 | Sárosd (C) | 28 | 20 | 6 | 2 | 82 | 24 | +58 | 66 | |
| 2 | Mór | 28 | 19 | 6 | 3 | 92 | 34 | +58 | 63 | |
| 3 | Ercsi | 28 | 15 | 5 | 8 | 58 | 32 | +26 | 50 | |
| 4 | Sárbogárd | 28 | 14 | 6 | 8 | 47 | 40 | +7 | 48 | |
| 5 | Főnix | 28 | 14 | 4 | 10 | 60 | 49 | +11 | 46 | |
| 6 | Bodajk | 28 | 13 | 6 | 9 | 42 | 27 | +15 | 45 | |
| 7 | Ikarus-Maroshegy | 28 | 12 | 8 | 8 | 44 | 29 | +15 | 44 | |
| 8 | Kápolnásnyék | 28 | 13 | 2 | 13 | 37 | 42 | −5 | 41 | |
| 9 | Kisláng | 28 | 10 | 8 | 10 | 52 | 53 | −1 | 38 | |
| 10 | Tordas | 28 | 9 | 5 | 14 | 42 | 48 | −6 | 32 | |
| 11 | Martonvásár | 28 | 9 | 4 | 15 | 41 | 49 | −8 | 31 | |
| 12 | Enying | 28 | 8 | 3 | 17 | 40 | 78 | −38 | 27 | |
| 13 | DUFK (R) | 28 | 6 | 4 | 18 | 27 | 85 | −58 | 22 | Relegation and not competed in any division next season |
| 14 | Lajoskomárom | 28 | 5 | 6 | 17 | 37 | 71 | −34 | 21 | |
| 15 | Mány | 28 | 4 | 5 | 19 | 32 | 72 | −40 | 17 | |

Source: Hungarian Football Federation
(C) Champions; (R) Relegated

=== Győr-Moson-Sopron ===
| Pos | Team | Pld | W | D | L | GF | GA | GD | Pts | Promotion or relegation |
|---|---|---|---|---|---|---|---|---|---|---|
| 1 | Győr II (C, O, P) | 30 | 26 | 4 | 0 | 153 | 21 | +132 | 82 | Qualification for promotion play-offs |
| 2 | Csorna | 30 | 23 | 5 | 2 | 97 | 23 | +74 | 74 | |
| 3 | DAC Nádorváros | 30 | 17 | 6 | 7 | 66 | 35 | +31 | 57 | |
| 4 | Vitnyéd | 30 | 14 | 8 | 8 | 65 | 36 | +29 | 50 | |
| 5 | Kapuvár | 30 | 13 | 9 | 8 | 80 | 69 | +11 | 48 | |
| 6 | Nyúl | 30 | 13 | 8 | 9 | 56 | 59 | −3 | 47 | |
| 7 | Abda | 30 | 12 | 8 | 10 | 71 | 59 | +12 | 44 | |
| 8 | Üstökös | 30 | 12 | 8 | 10 | 67 | 58 | +9 | 44 | |
| 9 | Gyirmót II (P) | 30 | 11 | 6 | 13 | 58 | 62 | −4 | 39 | Promotion to Nemzeti Bajnokság III |
| 10 | Jánossomorja | 30 | 11 | 6 | 13 | 54 | 64 | −10 | 39 | |
| 11 | Gönyű | 30 | 9 | 5 | 16 | 47 | 61 | −14 | 32 | |
| 12 | Soproni FAC | 30 | 9 | 5 | 16 | 56 | 74 | −18 | 32 | |
| 13 | Pannonhalma | 30 | 8 | 3 | 19 | 28 | 87 | −59 | 27 | |
| 14 | Győrszentiván | 30 | 7 | 6 | 17 | 44 | 62 | −18 | 27 | |
| 15 | Hegykő (R) | 30 | 7 | 5 | 18 | 42 | 65 | −23 | 26 | Relegation to Megyei Bajnokság II |
| 16 | Lébény (R) | 30 | 2 | 0 | 28 | 23 | 172 | −149 | 6 | Relegation to Megyei Bajnokság II |

Source: Hungarian Football Federation
(C) Champions; (O) Play-off winners; (P) Promoted; (R) Relegated

=== Hajdú-Bihar ===
| Pos | Team | Pld | W | D | L | GF | GA | GD | Pts | Promotion or relegation |
|---|---|---|---|---|---|---|---|---|---|---|
| 1 | Hajdúszoboszló (C, P) | 30 | 28 | 1 | 1 | 172 | 15 | +157 | 85 | Qualification for promotion play-offs |
| 2 | Sárrétudvari | 30 | 23 | 1 | 6 | 98 | 35 | +63 | 70 | |
| 3 | Balmazújváros | 30 | 21 | 4 | 5 | 90 | 33 | +57 | 67 | |
| 4 | Monostorpályi | 30 | 18 | 3 | 9 | 119 | 48 | +71 | 57 | |
| 5 | Berettyóújfalu | 30 | 17 | 3 | 10 | 81 | 48 | +33 | 54 | |
| 6 | Derecske | 30 | 17 | 2 | 11 | 75 | 44 | +31 | 53 | |
| 7 | Debreceni ASE | 30 | 14 | 5 | 11 | 79 | 56 | +23 | 47 | |
| 8 | Kaba | 30 | 14 | 4 | 12 | 60 | 62 | −2 | 46 | |
| 9 | Vámospércs | 30 | 13 | 3 | 14 | 69 | 62 | +7 | 42 | |
| 10 | Nyíradony | 30 | 13 | 2 | 15 | 60 | 56 | +4 | 41 | |
| 11 | Hajdúnánás | 30 | 12 | 3 | 15 | 68 | 63 | +5 | 39 | |
| 12 | Debreceni EAC II | 30 | 8 | 3 | 19 | 70 | 68 | +2 | 27 | |
| 13 | Püspökladány | 30 | 8 | 3 | 19 | 45 | 90 | −45 | 27 | |
| 14 | Hajdúsámson | 30 | 7 | 6 | 17 | 77 | 100 | −23 | 27 | |
| 15 | Hajdúhadház (R) | 30 | 4 | 3 | 23 | 34 | 163 | −129 | 15 | Relegation to Megyei Bajnokság II |
| 16 | Hajdúböszörmény | 30 | 0 | 0 | 30 | 14 | 268 | −254 | 0 | |

Source: Hungarian Football Federation
(C) Champions; (P) Promoted; (R) Relegated

=== Heves ===
| Pos | Team | Pld | W | D | L | GF | GA | GD | Pts | Promotion or relegation |
|---|---|---|---|---|---|---|---|---|---|---|
| 1 | Lőrinci (C) | 26 | 18 | 5 | 3 | 62 | 24 | +38 | 59 | |
| 2 | Energia | 26 | 17 | 6 | 3 | 46 | 19 | +27 | 57 | |
| 3 | Heréd | 26 | 14 | 6 | 6 | 60 | 37 | +23 | 48 | |
| 4 | Gyöngyöshalász | 26 | 13 | 8 | 5 | 57 | 36 | +21 | 47 | |
| 5 | Besenyőtelek | 26 | 13 | 4 | 9 | 54 | 42 | +12 | 43 | |
| 6 | Marshall-Andornaktálya | 26 | 11 | 6 | 9 | 58 | 45 | +13 | 39 | |
| 7 | Pétervására (R) | 26 | 11 | 2 | 13 | 40 | 45 | −5 | 35 | Relegation and not competed in any division next season |
| 8 | Egerszalók | 26 | 10 | 4 | 12 | 41 | 32 | +9 | 34 | |
| 9 | Bélkő | 26 | 10 | 3 | 13 | 44 | 54 | −10 | 33 | |
| 10 | Maklár | 26 | 8 | 5 | 13 | 33 | 48 | −15 | 29 | |
| 11 | Heves | 26 | 7 | 7 | 12 | 44 | 52 | −8 | 28 | |
| 12 | Eger II | 26 | 7 | 2 | 17 | 37 | 73 | −36 | 23 | |
| 13 | Felsőtárkány | 26 | 5 | 5 | 16 | 32 | 65 | −33 | 20 | |
| 14 | Füzesabony | 26 | 5 | 3 | 18 | 33 | 69 | −36 | 18 | |

Source: Hungarian Football Federation
(C) Champions; (R) Relegated

=== Jász-Nagykun-Szolnok ===
| Pos | Team | Pld | W | D | L | GF | GA | GD | Pts | Promotion or relegation |
|---|---|---|---|---|---|---|---|---|---|---|
| 1 | Törökszentmiklós (C, P) | 28 | 22 | 4 | 2 | 84 | 23 | +61 | 70 | Qualification for promotion play-offs |
| 2 | Tószeg | 28 | 19 | 6 | 3 | 59 | 24 | +35 | 63 | |
| 3 | Tiszaföldvár | 28 | 18 | 5 | 5 | 93 | 30 | +63 | 59 | |
| 4 | Karcag | 28 | 13 | 12 | 3 | 71 | 29 | +42 | 51 | |
| 5 | Martfű | 28 | 15 | 4 | 9 | 48 | 33 | +15 | 49 | |
| 6 | Jászárokszállás | 28 | 14 | 6 | 8 | 53 | 34 | +19 | 48 | |
| 7 | Mezőtúr | 28 | 13 | 7 | 8 | 51 | 34 | +17 | 46 | |
| 8 | Újszász | 28 | 13 | 6 | 9 | 49 | 38 | +11 | 45 | |
| 9 | Jászfényszaru | 28 | 10 | 6 | 12 | 56 | 38 | +18 | 36 | |
| 10 | Kunhegyes | 28 | 9 | 6 | 13 | 38 | 61 | −23 | 33 | |
| 11 | Jánoshida | 28 | 6 | 5 | 17 | 34 | 70 | −36 | 23 | |
| 12 | Szajol | 28 | 5 | 6 | 17 | 31 | 60 | −29 | 21 | |
| 13 | Kisújszállás | 28 | 5 | 5 | 18 | 34 | 88 | −54 | 20 | |
| 14 | Kunszentmárton | 28 | 5 | 1 | 22 | 36 | 80 | −44 | 16 | |
| 15 | Fegyvernek (R) | 28 | 1 | 5 | 22 | 28 | 123 | −95 | 8 | Relegation to Megyei Bajnokság II |

Source: Hungarian Football Federation
(C) Champions; (P) Promoted; (R) Relegated

=== Komárom-Esztergom ===
==== Regular stage ====
| Pos | Team | Pld | W | D | L | GF | GA | GD | Pts | Promotion or relegation |
|---|---|---|---|---|---|---|---|---|---|---|
| 1 | Sárisáp | 24 | 19 | 2 | 3 | 60 | 27 | +33 | 59 | Qualification for promotion group |
| 2 | Zsámbék | 24 | 19 | 2 | 3 | 92 | 18 | +74 | 57 (Note: Zsámbék were deducted 2 points) | Qualification for promotion group |
| 3 | Koppánymonostor | 24 | 17 | 2 | 5 | 53 | 16 | +37 | 53 | Qualification for promotion group |
| 4 | Nyergesújfalu | 24 | 15 | 3 | 6 | 75 | 29 | +46 | 48 | Qualification for promotion group |
| 5 | Esztergom | 24 | 15 | 3 | 6 | 61 | 21 | +40 | 48 | Qualification for promotion group |
| 6 | Kecskéd | 24 | 11 | 4 | 9 | 60 | 41 | +19 | 37 | Qualification for promotion group |
| 7 | Oroszlány | 23 | 11 | 1 | 11 | 46 | 54 | −8 | 34 | Qualification for relegation group |
| 8 | Vérteszőlős | 23 | 10 | 2 | 11 | 42 | 42 | 0 | 32 | Qualification for relegation group |
| 9 | Tata | 24 | 7 | 2 | 15 | 46 | 78 | −32 | 23 | Qualification for relegation group |
| 10 | Vértesomló | 24 | 5 | 5 | 14 | 46 | 64 | −18 | 20 | Qualification for relegation group |
| 11 | Bábolna | 24 | 5 | 3 | 16 | 35 | 65 | −30 | 18 | Qualification for relegation group |
| 12 | Környe | 24 | 3 | 2 | 19 | 28 | 100 | −72 | 11 | Qualification for relegation group |
| 13 | Nagyigmánd | 24 | 2 | 1 | 21 | 23 | 112 | −89 | 7 | Qualification for relegation group |

Source: Hungarian Football Federation

==== Promotion group ====
| Pos | Team | Pld | W | D | L | GF | GA | GD | Pts |
|---|---|---|---|---|---|---|---|---|---|
| 1 | Zsámbék (C) | 29 | 23 | 2 | 4 | 103 | 21 | +82 | 69 (Note: Zsámbék were deducted 2 points) |
| 2 | Sárisáp | 29 | 21 | 2 | 6 | 71 | 40 | +31 | 65 |
| 3 | Nyergesújfalu | 29 | 19 | 4 | 6 | 85 | 33 | +52 | 61 |
| 4 | Koppánymonostor | 29 | 18 | 4 | 7 | 63 | 25 | +38 | 58 |
| 5 | Esztergom | 29 | 16 | 3 | 10 | 67 | 34 | +33 | 51 |
| 6 | Kecskéd | 29 | 12 | 5 | 12 | 66 | 53 | +13 | 41 |

Source: Hungarian Football Federation
(C) Champions

==== Relegation group ====
| Pos | Team | Pld | W | D | L | GF | GA | GD | Pts | Relegation |
|---|---|---|---|---|---|---|---|---|---|---|
| 1 | Vérteszőlős | 30 | 14 | 3 | 13 | 66 | 61 | +5 | 45 | |
| 2 | Tata | 30 | 12 | 3 | 15 | 77 | 83 | −6 | 39 | |
| 3 | Oroszlány (R) | 30 | 11 | 1 | 18 | 52 | 110 | −58 | 34 | Relegation to Megyei Bajnokság III |
| 4 | Vértesomló | 30 | 9 | 6 | 15 | 85 | 73 | +12 | 33 | |
| 5 | Bábolna | 30 | 9 | 3 | 18 | 48 | 77 | −29 | 30 | |
| 6 | Környe | 30 | 5 | 2 | 23 | 50 | 122 | −72 | 17 | |
| 7 | Nagyigmánd | 30 | 3 | 2 | 25 | 30 | 131 | −101 | 11 | |

Source: Hungarian Football Federation
(R) Relegated

=== Nógrád ===
| Pos | Team | Pld | W | D | L | GF | GA | GD | Pts |
|---|---|---|---|---|---|---|---|---|---|
| 1 | Berkenye (C) | 26 | 18 | 5 | 3 | 87 | 28 | +59 | 59 |
| 2 | Mátraterenye | 26 | 17 | 6 | 3 | 59 | 27 | +32 | 57 |
| 3 | Karancslapujtő | 26 | 15 | 6 | 5 | 64 | 31 | +33 | 51 |
| 4 | Diósjenő | 26 | 15 | 3 | 8 | 50 | 37 | +13 | 48 |
| 5 | Palotás | 26 | 13 | 6 | 7 | 63 | 34 | +29 | 45 |
| 6 | Héhalom | 26 | 13 | 5 | 8 | 53 | 31 | +22 | 44 |
| 7 | Mohora | 26 | 12 | 7 | 7 | 73 | 31 | +42 | 43 |
| 8 | Pásztó | 26 | 10 | 6 | 10 | 46 | 35 | +11 | 36 |
| 9 | Nőtincs | 26 | 9 | 4 | 13 | 42 | 43 | −1 | 31 |
| 10 | Érsekvadkert | 26 | 6 | 9 | 11 | 39 | 49 | −10 | 27 |
| 11 | Szécsény | 26 | 6 | 5 | 15 | 37 | 55 | −18 | 23 |
| 12 | Építők | 26 | 6 | 4 | 16 | 39 | 86 | −47 | 22 |
| 13 | Szendehely | 26 | 6 | 0 | 20 | 30 | 81 | −51 | 18 |
| 14 | Rimóc | 26 | 3 | 0 | 23 | 31 | 145 | −114 | 9 |

Source: Hungarian Football Federation
(C) Champions

=== Pest ===
| Pos | Team | Pld | W | D | L | GF | GA | GD | Pts | Promotion or relegation |
|---|---|---|---|---|---|---|---|---|---|---|
| 1 | Vecsés (C) | 28 | 22 | 3 | 3 | 75 | 25 | +50 | 69 | |
| 2 | Dunaharaszti | 28 | 21 | 5 | 2 | 60 | 18 | +42 | 68 | |
| 3 | Nagykáta | 28 | 16 | 3 | 9 | 45 | 37 | +8 | 51 | |
| 4 | Biatorbágy | 28 | 14 | 6 | 8 | 55 | 41 | +14 | 48 | |
| 5 | Gödöllő | 28 | 13 | 6 | 9 | 46 | 33 | +13 | 45 | |
| 6 | Cso-Ki Sport | 28 | 13 | 3 | 12 | 44 | 44 | 0 | 42 | |
| 7 | Maglód | 28 | 11 | 6 | 11 | 45 | 43 | +2 | 39 | |
| 8 | Veresegyház | 28 | 11 | 5 | 12 | 44 | 39 | +5 | 38 | |
| 9 | Dunavarsány | 28 | 11 | 3 | 14 | 47 | 51 | −4 | 36 | |
| 10 | Budakalász | 28 | 11 | 3 | 14 | 41 | 52 | −11 | 36 | |
| 11 | Felsőpakony | 28 | 10 | 4 | 14 | 43 | 48 | −5 | 34 | |
| 12 | Pilis | 28 | 9 | 5 | 14 | 42 | 45 | −3 | 32 | |
| 13 | Tököl | 28 | 8 | 5 | 15 | 34 | 57 | −23 | 29 | |
| 14 | Dunakeszi (R) | 28 | 6 | 3 | 19 | 31 | 73 | −42 | 21 | Relegation to Megyei Bajnokság II |
| 15 | Százhalombatta (R) | 28 | 2 | 4 | 22 | 22 | 68 | −46 | 10 | Relegation to Megyei Bajnokság II |
| 16 | Törtel (Note: Törtel withdrew from the championship. The club's senior team not competed in any division next season.) (D, R) | 0 | 0 | 0 | 0 | 0 | 0 | 0 | 0 | Dissolved |

Source: Hungarian Football Federation
(C) Champions; (D) Disqualified; (R) Relegated

=== Somogy ===
| Pos | Team | Pld | W | D | L | GF | GA | GD | Pts | Promotion or relegation |
|---|---|---|---|---|---|---|---|---|---|---|
| 1 | Balatonlelle (C) | 26 | 20 | 3 | 3 | 96 | 24 | +72 | 63 | Qualification for promotion play-offs |
| 2 | Kadarkút | 26 | 19 | 2 | 5 | 75 | 28 | +47 | 59 | |
| 3 | Balatonkeresztúr | 26 | 19 | 1 | 6 | 85 | 32 | +53 | 58 | |
| 4 | Somogysárd | 26 | 17 | 3 | 6 | 68 | 42 | +26 | 54 | |
| 5 | Nagybajom | 26 | 16 | 4 | 6 | 63 | 25 | +38 | 52 | |
| 6 | Toponár | 26 | 14 | 4 | 8 | 75 | 45 | +30 | 46 | |
| 7 | Balatoni Vasas | 26 | 12 | 4 | 10 | 46 | 36 | +10 | 40 | |
| 8 | Hetes (R) | 26 | 12 | 4 | 10 | 48 | 52 | −4 | 38 (Note: Hetes were deducted 2 points) | Relegation and not competed in any division next season |
| 9 | Juta | 26 | 6 | 7 | 13 | 28 | 58 | −30 | 25 | |
| 10 | Marcali | 26 | 6 | 6 | 14 | 28 | 50 | −22 | 23 (Note: Marcali were deducted 1 point) | |
| 11 | Segesd | 26 | 6 | 4 | 16 | 38 | 64 | −26 | 22 | |
| 12 | Tab | 26 | 6 | 4 | 16 | 46 | 59 | −13 | 21 (Note: Tab were deducted 1 point) | |
| 13 | Csurgó | 26 | 3 | 2 | 21 | 30 | 112 | −82 | 11 | |
| 14 | Somogyjád (R) | 26 | 1 | 2 | 23 | 19 | 118 | −99 | 5 | Relegation to Megyei Bajnokság II |

Source: Hungarian Football Federation
(C) Champions; (R) Relegated

=== Szabolcs-Szatmár-Bereg ===
| Pos | Team | Pld | W | D | L | GF | GA | GD | Pts | Promotion or relegation |
|---|---|---|---|---|---|---|---|---|---|---|
| 1 | Tarpa (C) | 30 | 23 | 7 | 0 | 81 | 22 | +59 | 76 | Qualification for promotion play-offs |
| 2 | Nagyecsed | 30 | 19 | 5 | 6 | 58 | 37 | +21 | 62 | |
| 3 | Újfehértó | 30 | 18 | 6 | 6 | 71 | 49 | +22 | 60 | |
| 4 | Nyírgyulaj | 30 | 17 | 6 | 7 | 72 | 37 | +35 | 57 | |
| 5 | Ibrány | 30 | 15 | 8 | 7 | 60 | 33 | +27 | 53 | |
| 6 | Mátészalka | 30 | 14 | 6 | 10 | 63 | 39 | +24 | 48 | |
| 7 | Vásárosnamény | 30 | 14 | 6 | 10 | 55 | 39 | +16 | 48 | |
| 8 | Csenger | 30 | 13 | 7 | 10 | 70 | 60 | +10 | 46 | |
| 9 | Nagyhalász | 30 | 10 | 10 | 10 | 59 | 51 | +8 | 40 | |
| 10 | Mándok | 30 | 9 | 7 | 14 | 60 | 66 | −6 | 34 | |
| 11 | Nyírmeggyes | 30 | 9 | 3 | 18 | 55 | 83 | −28 | 30 | |
| 12 | Balkány | 30 | 8 | 5 | 17 | 41 | 69 | −28 | 29 | |
| 13 | Gyulaháza | 30 | 7 | 5 | 18 | 46 | 74 | −28 | 26 | |
| 14 | Kemecse SE | 30 | 6 | 7 | 17 | 43 | 73 | −30 | 25 | |
| 15 | Baktalórántháza (R) | 30 | 6 | 6 | 18 | 39 | 76 | −37 | 24 | Relegation to Megyei Bajnokság II |
| 16 | Fehérgyarmat | 30 | 3 | 4 | 23 | 31 | 96 | −65 | 13 | |

Source: Hungarian Football Federation
(C) Champions; (R) Relegated

=== Tolna ===
| Pos | Team | Pld | W | D | L | GF | GA | GD | Pts | Promotion or relegation |
|---|---|---|---|---|---|---|---|---|---|---|
| 1 | Gerjen (C, O, P) | 24 | 18 | 1 | 5 | 73 | 28 | +45 | 55 | Qualification for promotion play-offs |
| 2 | Bonyhád | 24 | 17 | 1 | 6 | 93 | 37 | +56 | 52 | |
| 3 | Bölcske | 24 | 16 | 4 | 4 | 58 | 30 | +28 | 52 | |
| 4 | Bátaszék | 24 | 16 | 3 | 5 | 76 | 38 | +38 | 51 | |
| 5 | Tamási | 24 | 9 | 6 | 9 | 38 | 39 | −1 | 33 | |
| 6 | Tevel | 24 | 8 | 1 | 15 | 43 | 55 | −12 | 25 | |
| 7 | Kakasd | 24 | 7 | 2 | 15 | 45 | 77 | −32 | 23 | |
| 8 | Dombóvár | 24 | 5 | 4 | 15 | 31 | 69 | −38 | 19 | |
| 9 | Dunaföldvár | 24 | 0 | 2 | 22 | 32 | 116 | −84 | 2 | |

Source: Hungarian Football Federation
(C) Champions; (O) Play-off winners; (P) Promoted

=== Vas ===
| Pos | Team | Pld | W | D | L | GF | GA | GD | Pts | Promotion or relegation |
|---|---|---|---|---|---|---|---|---|---|---|
| 1 | Sárvár (C) | 32 | 24 | 2 | 6 | 98 | 24 | +74 | 74 | |
| 2 | Király | 32 | 20 | 5 | 7 | 83 | 27 | +56 | 65 | |
| 3 | Vép | 32 | 19 | 7 | 6 | 73 | 34 | +39 | 64 | |
| 4 | Körmend | 32 | 17 | 4 | 11 | 79 | 45 | +34 | 55 | |
| 5 | Répcelak | 32 | 16 | 7 | 9 | 68 | 51 | +17 | 55 | |
| 6 | Jánosháza | 32 | 15 | 7 | 10 | 59 | 52 | +7 | 52 | |
| 7 | Lukácsháza | 32 | 14 | 5 | 13 | 55 | 54 | +1 | 47 | |
| 8 | Celldömölk | 32 | 13 | 8 | 11 | 63 | 44 | +19 | 47 | |
| 9 | Szentgotthárd | 32 | 13 | 7 | 12 | 55 | 51 | +4 | 46 | |
| 10 | Rábapaty | 32 | 13 | 6 | 13 | 54 | 76 | −22 | 45 | |
| 11 | Bük | 32 | 12 | 4 | 16 | 33 | 59 | −26 | 40 | |
| 12 | Kőszeg | 32 | 11 | 7 | 14 | 53 | 62 | −9 | 40 | |
| 13 | Egyházasrádóc | 32 | 9 | 6 | 17 | 41 | 71 | −30 | 33 | |
| 14 | Vasvár | 32 | 8 | 6 | 18 | 45 | 77 | −32 | 30 | |
| 15 | Csepreg (R) | 32 | 7 | 8 | 17 | 41 | 54 | −13 | 29 | Relegation to Megyei Bajnokság II |
| 16 | Szarvaskend (R) | 32 | 5 | 8 | 19 | 42 | 110 | −68 | 23 | Relegation to Megyei Bajnokság II |
| 17 | Rum (R) | 32 | 6 | 3 | 23 | 34 | 85 | −51 | 21 | Relegation to Megyei Bajnokság II |

Source: Hungarian Football Federation
(C) Champions; (R) Relegated

=== Veszprém ===
| Pos | Team | Pld | W | D | L | GF | GA | GD | Pts | Promotion or relegation |
|---|---|---|---|---|---|---|---|---|---|---|
| 1 | Tihany (C) | 28 | 24 | 1 | 3 | 142 | 21 | +121 | 73 | |
| 2 | Ajka Kristály | 28 | 20 | 5 | 3 | 102 | 31 | +71 | 65 | |
| 3 | Balatonalmádi | 28 | 20 | 4 | 4 | 106 | 25 | +81 | 64 | |
| 4 | Úrkút | 28 | 20 | 2 | 6 | 77 | 25 | +52 | 62 | |
| 5 | Tapolca | 28 | 17 | 3 | 8 | 87 | 60 | +27 | 54 | |
| 6 | Fűzfő | 28 | 16 | 3 | 9 | 78 | 45 | +33 | 51 | |
| 7 | Pét | 28 | 13 | 5 | 10 | 66 | 63 | +3 | 44 | |
| 8 | Magyarpolány | 28 | 12 | 4 | 12 | 73 | 72 | +1 | 40 | |
| 9 | Sümeg | 28 | 12 | 2 | 14 | 58 | 63 | −5 | 38 | |
| 10 | Devecser | 28 | 9 | 4 | 15 | 55 | 75 | −20 | 31 | |
| 11 | Badacsonytomaj (R) | 28 | 6 | 6 | 16 | 48 | 99 | −51 | 24 | Relegation to Megyei Bajnokság III |
| 12 | Várpalota | 28 | 6 | 3 | 19 | 36 | 92 | −56 | 21 | |
| 13 | Gyulafirátót | 28 | 3 | 7 | 18 | 26 | 89 | −63 | 16 | |
| 14 | Herend | 28 | 3 | 2 | 23 | 20 | 95 | −75 | 11 | |
| 15 | Csetény | 28 | 3 | 1 | 24 | 25 | 144 | −119 | 10 | |

Source: Hungarian Football Federation
(C) Champions; (R) Relegated

=== Zala ===
| Pos | Team | Pld | W | D | L | GF | GA | GD | Pts | Promotion or relegation |
|---|---|---|---|---|---|---|---|---|---|---|
| 1 | Andráshida SC (C, P) | 28 | 22 | 4 | 2 | 98 | 16 | +82 | 70 | Qualification for promotion play-offs |
| 2 | Andráshida TE | 28 | 21 | 4 | 3 | 69 | 25 | +44 | 67 | |
| 3 | Teskánd | 28 | 20 | 4 | 4 | 118 | 30 | +88 | 64 | |
| 4 | Zalaszentgrót | 28 | 16 | 6 | 6 | 85 | 30 | +55 | 54 | |
| 5 | Semjénháza | 28 | 15 | 8 | 5 | 53 | 24 | +29 | 53 | |
| 6 | Csácsbozsok-Nemesapáti | 28 | 16 | 3 | 9 | 76 | 43 | +33 | 51 | |
| 7 | Szepetnek | 28 | 14 | 5 | 9 | 55 | 38 | +17 | 47 | |
| 8 | Gyenesdiás | 28 | 14 | 4 | 10 | 79 | 59 | +20 | 46 | |
| 9 | Csesztreg | 28 | 13 | 1 | 14 | 68 | 66 | +2 | 40 | |
| 10 | Lenti | 28 | 10 | 4 | 14 | 59 | 67 | −8 | 34 | |
| 11 | Letenye | 28 | 6 | 3 | 19 | 40 | 103 | −63 | 21 | |
| 12 | Zalakomár | 28 | 4 | 3 | 21 | 42 | 114 | −72 | 15 | |
| 13 | Zalalövő | 28 | 4 | 2 | 22 | 17 | 81 | −64 | 14 | |
| 14 | Kiskanizsa | 28 | 4 | 2 | 22 | 31 | 101 | −70 | 14 | |
| 15 | Hévíz | 28 | 4 | 1 | 23 | 30 | 123 | −93 | 13 | |

Source: Hungarian Football Federation
(C) Champions; (P) Promoted

== Promotion play-offs ==
Following the conclusion of the county championship competitions, 15 of the 20 county champions obtained an Nemzeti Bajnokság III licence, of which 14 entered the promotion process. As six of those clubs received automatic promotion by draw, Makó, Hajdúszoboszló, Mohács, Törökszentmiklós, Andráshida SC and Kelen were promoted directly to 2021–22 Nemzeti Bajnokság III, while Győr II, Hidasnémeti, Tarpa, Békéscsaba 1912 Előre II, Balatonlelle, Jánoshalma, Lőrinci and Gerjen contested the remaining four promotion places in two-legged play-offs.

The play-offs were won by Gerjen, Győr II, Békéscsaba 1912 Előre II and Jánoshalma, which secured promotion to NB III after winning their respective ties on aggregate. Together with the six clubs promoted automatically, they completed the list of promoted teams for the 2021–22 NB III season.

Before the new season began, Lipót withdrew from NB III, creating a vacancy in the league. Under the federation's replacement regulations, the place was expected to be offered to Hidasnémeti as the best-performing defeated play-off team, while BKV Előre would become eligible only if Hidasnémeti also declined participation.

Jánoshalma was subsequently refused entry into NB III after the Hungarian Football Federation did not recognise seven Serbian players in its squad as domestic players. Consequently, BKV Előre retained its place in the division instead.

=== Matches ===
| Team 1 | Agg. | Team 2 | 1st leg | 2nd leg |
|---|---|---|---|---|
| Lőrinci | 1–2 | Gerjen | 0–1 | 1–1 |
| Győr II | 10–0 | Hidasnémeti | 5–0 | 5–0 |
| Tarpa | 1–5 | Békéscsaba 1912 Előre II | 0–3 | 1–2 |
| Balatonlelle | 0–2 | Jánoshalma | 0–1 | 0–1 |

==== Details ====
All times Central European Summer Time (UTC+2)

6 June 2021
14:00

| Lőrinci | 0–1 | Gerjen |
|---|---|---|
| | Report | Steinbach 36' |

Lőrinci Sporttelep, Selyp
Attendance: 250
Referee: Sándor Szilágyi
12 June 2021
14:00

| Gerjen | 1–1 | Lőrinci |
|---|---|---|
| Steinbach 60' | Report | Bogdán 65' |

Gerjeni SK Sporttelep, Gerjen
Attendance: 300
Referee: Imre Kovács

Gerjen won 2–1 on aggregate and are promoted to the Nemzeti Bajnokság III.

6 June 2021
16:00

| Győr II | 5–0 | Hidasnémeti |
|---|---|---|
| Szuhodovszki 11'; Berki 15', 79', 81' (pen.); Farkas 39' | Report |

ETO Park, Győr
Attendance: 400
Referee: Tibor Horváth
12 June 2021
16:00

| Hidasnémeti | 0–5 | Győr II |
|---|---|---|
| | Report | Farkas 6', 88'; Vincze 27'; Vankó 53'; Vitális 78' |

Hidasnémeti Sportpálya, Hidasnémeti
Referee: Tamás Nazsa

Győr II won 10–0 on aggregate and are promoted to the Nemzeti Bajnokság III.

6 June 2021
17:30

| Tarpa | 0–3 | Békéscsaba 1912 Előre II |
|---|---|---|
| | Report | P. Szabó 49'; Ilyés 65'; Varga 90+3' |

Tarpa Sportcentrum, Tarpa
Attendance: 600
Referee: Márk Szigetvári
12 June 2021
17:00

| Békéscsaba 1912 Előre II | 2–1 | Tarpa |
|---|---|---|
| Ilyés 6', 47' | Report | Tüzes 45+2' |

Kórház utcai Stadion, Békéscsaba
Attendance: 450
Referee: Róbert Nagy

Békéscsaba 1912 Előre II won 5–1 on aggregate and are promoted to the Nemzeti Bajnokság III.

6 June 2021
17:30

| Balatonlelle | 0–1 | Jánoshalma |
|---|---|---|
| | Report | Stojanović 69' |

Balatonlellei SE Sportpálya, Balatonlelle
Attendance: 450
Referee: Marcell Derdák
12 June 2021
17:00

| Jánoshalma | 1–0 | Balatonlelle |
|---|---|---|
| Stojanović 78' | Report |

Jánoshalma Sporttelep, Jánoshalma
Attendance: 470
Referee: Tamás Takács

Jánoshalma won 2–0 on aggregate and are promoted to the Nemzeti Bajnokság III. However, the club was later denied entry due to player eligibility issues.

== See also ==
- 2020–21 Magyar Kupa
- 2020–21 Nemzeti Bajnokság III
- 2020–21 Nemzeti Bajnokság II
- 2020–21 Nemzeti Bajnokság I
