= 2021–22 Magyar Kupa =

Tournament details
- Country: Hungary
- Dates: 18 September 2021 – 11 May 2022
- Teams: 128 (Main round)

Final positions
- Champions: Ferencváros (24th title)
- Runners-up: Paks

Tournament statistics
- Top goal scorer(s): (Albania) Myrto Uzuni (8 goals)

The 2021–22 Magyar Kupa (English: Hungarian Cup) is the 82nd season of Hungary's annual knock-out cup football competition. The title holders were Újpest FC by winning the 2021 Magyar Kupa final.

== Format ==
Round	Number of fixtures	Clubs	New entries this round	Leagues entering at this round (tier)
First round	64	128 → 64	128	Nemzeti Bajnokság III (3rd): 44 teams Megyei Bajnokság I (4th): 84 teams Megyei Bajnokság II (5th)
Second round	32	64 → 32	none	none
Third round Round of 64	32	64 → 32	32	Nemzeti Bajnokság I (1st): 12 teams Nemzeti Bajnokság II (2nd): 20 teams
Fourth round Round of 32	16	32 → 16	none	none
Fifth round Round of 16	8	16 → 8	none	none
Sixth round Quarter-finals	4	8 → 4	none	none
Seventh round Semi-finals	2	4 → 2	none	none
Eighth round Final	1	2 → 1	none	none

== Teams ==
Tier	League	No	Teams
1	NB I	12	Debreceni VSC, Fehérvár, Ferencváros, Gyirmót, Honvéd, Kisvárda, Mezőkövesd, MTK Budapest, Paks, Puskás Akadémia, Újpest, Zalaegerszeg
2	NB II	20	III. Kerület, Ajka, Békéscsaba, Budafok, Budaörs, Csákvár, Diósgyőr, Dorog, Győr, Kecskemét, Nyíregyháza, Pécs, Siófok, Soroksár, Szeged, Szentlőrinc, Szolnok, Szombathely, Tiszakécske, Vasas
3	NB III (West)	15	Andráshida, Balatonfüred, Bicske, BVSC Budapest, Érd, Gárdony, Kaposvár, Kelen, Komárom, Mosonmagyaróvár, Nagykanizsa, Pápa, Sopron, Tatabánya, Veszprém
3	NB III (Centre)	16	Balassagyarmat, Cegléd, Dabas, Dabas-Gyón, Dunaújváros, ESMTK, Gerjen, Hódmezővásárhely, Iváncsa, Kozármisleny, Makó, Mohács, Monor, Rákosmente, Szekszárd, Vác
3	NBIII (East)	16	BKV Előre, Debreceni EAC, Eger, Füzesgyarmat, Hajdúszoboszló, Hidasnémet, Jászberény, Kazincbarcika, Putnok, Salgótarján, Sényő, Tállya, Tiszaújváros, Tiszafüred, Törökszentmiklós
4	MB I	35	Balatonalmádi, Bátaszék, Bonyhád, Csepel, Ercsi, Felsőzsolca, Gyöngyös, Gyömrő, Gyula, Hatvan, Heréd, Ibrány, Jánoshalma, Kadarkút, Karancslapujtő, Karcag, Koroncó, Ménfőcsanak, Monostorpályi, Mór, Nagyatád, Perbál, Pécsvárad, Ráckeve, Sárosd, Semjénháza, Szabadszállás, Szegedi VSE, Tarpa, Teskánd, Tihany, Tordas, Tököl, Zalaszentgrót, Zsámbék

== Round of 64 ==
18 September 2021 32nd finals	Sényő (3)	0–7	(1) MTK Budapest	Sényő
13:00 CET		Report	Grozav 9'; Miovski 19', 34'; Kovácsréti 42', 47'; Kosznovszky 68'; Vancsa 72'	Stadium: Sényő Sporttelep; Referee: Norbert Nagy

18 September 2021 32nd finals	Dabas (3)	1–2	(2) Szombathelyi Haladás	Dabas
14:30 CET	Földes 78'	Report	M. Tóth 26'; Debreceni 40'	Stadium: FC Dabas-Wellis Sportpark; Referee: Bálint Dolnegó

18 September 2021 32nd finals	Vác (3)	0–4	(1) Zalaegerszeg	Vác
15:00 CET		Report	Borukov 43'; Zimonyi 78', 84'; Koszta 85'	Stadium: Városi Stadion; Referee: Eszter Urbán

18 September 2021 32nd finals	DEAC (3)	0–2	(1) Kisvárda	Debrecen
15:00 CET		Report	Zličić 51'; Camaj 76'	Stadium: DEAC Sporttelep; Referee: József Ducsai

18 September 2021 32nd finals	Komárom (3)	0–2	(1) Mezőkövesd	Komárom
15:00 CET		Report	Cseri 22' (pen.); Dražić 43'	Stadium: Molaji Sporttelep; Referee: Marcell Derdák

18 September 2021 32nd finals	Veszprém (3)	0–1	(1) Debrecen	Veszprém
15:00 CET		Report	Nikolić 73'	Stadium: Városi Stadion; Referee: Ádám Németh

18 September 2021 32nd finals	UFC Gyömrő (4)	1–9	(1) Paks	Gyömrő
15:00 CET	Gergely 84'	Report	Pethő 19', 28', 66', 85'; R. Nagy 34'; Böde 51', 64'; Sajbán 61'; Windecker 70'	Stadium: UFC Gyömrői Sporttelep; Referee: Márk Szigetvári

18 September 2021 32nd finals	Jászberény (3)	2–1	(3) Balassagyarmat	Jászberény
15:00 CET	Szöllősi 78', 103' (pen.)	Report	Gergely 48' (pen.)	Stadium: Városi Stadion; Referee: László Lovas

18 September 2021 32nd finals	Budaörs (2)	1–3	(2) Vasas	Budaörs
15:00 CET	Molnár 54' (pen.)	Report	Radó 43'; Hidi 47'; Hinora 56'	Stadium: Városi Stadion; Referee: Róbert Nagy

18 September 2021 32nd finals	Monor (3)	0–3	(2) Csákvár	Monor
15:00 CET		Report	Torvund 2'; Molnár 67'; Kalmár 79'	Stadium: Balassi Bálint utcai stadion Referee: Márió Zimmermann

18 September 2021 32nd finals	Kelen (3)	0–4	(2) Szeged-Csanád Grosics Akadémia	Budapest, Kelenföld
15:00 CET		Report	Gajdos 28'; Gréczi 48'; Pejović 52'; Kóródi 53'	Stadium: Kelen SC Sporttelep; Referee: Attila Molnár

18 September 2021 32nd finals	Cegléd (3)	3–0	(3) Kaposvár	Cegléd
15:00 CET	Kelemen 51', 76'; Lukács 80'	Report		Stadium: Zsengellér Gyula Sporttelep; Referee: Tibor Farkas

18 September 2021 32nd finals	Csepel (4)	0–1	(4) Szegedi VSE	Budapest
15:00 CET		Report	Taçi 80'	Stadium: Béke téri Stadion; Attendance: Gábor Kátai

18 September 2021 32nd finals	Mosonmagyaróvár (3)	0–3	(2) Győr	Mosonmagyaróvár
15:00 CET		Report	Sipőcz 44'; Bacsa 54'; Múcska 61'	Stadium: MTE 1904 Sporttelep; Referee: Gergely Szőts

18 September 2021 32nd finals	VSK Tököl (4)	4–2	(4) Teskánd KSE	Tököl
15:00 CET	Galambos 16', 66'; Nagy-Jáger 21'; Árkocsevics 36'	Report	Pergel 23'; Simonfalvi 50'	Stadium: VSE Sporttelep; Referee: Bottyán Aurél Borbás

18 September 2021 32nd finals	Budapesti VSC (3)	1–0	(3) Iváncsa	Budapest
15:00 CET	Kokenszky 18'	Report		Stadium: Szőnyi úti Stadion; Referee: Máté Kubicsek

18 September 2021 32nd finals	Pápa (3)	1–4	(2) Budafok	Pápa
16:00 CET	Skriba 51'	Report	Papp 12'; Szabó 23'; Adorján 67'; Szalai 82'	Stadium: Perutz Stadion; Referee: Márió Görög

18 September 2021 32nd finals	Tiszakécske (2)	0–3	(1) Újpest	Tiszakécske
18:00 CET		Report	Diaby 38', 53'; Beridze 60'	Stadium: Városi Sportcentrum; Referee: Zoltán Kovács J.

18 September 2021 32nd finals	Sopron (3)	2–6	(1) Fehérvár	Sopron
18:00 CET	Krizsonits 33'; Kustor 51' (pen.)	Report	Nikolić 9' (pen.); Jallow 14', 39'; Dárdai 19'; Csoboth 24', 80'	Stadium: Káposztás utcai Stadion; Referee: Ádám Pillók

18 September 2021 32nd finals	Diósgyőr (2)	2–1	(2) Szentlőrinc	Miskolc
18:00 CET	Zsolnai 2'; Makrai 41'	Report	Bányai 29'	Stadium: Diósgyőri Stadion; Referee: Gábor Oláh

18 September 2021 32nd finals	Kazincbarcika (3)	2–1	(2) Szolnok	Kazincbarcika
18:00 CET	Schildkraut 33'; Dvorschák 62'	Report	Sipos 68'	Stadium: Kolorcity Aréna; Referee: Sándor Szilágyi

18 September 2021 32nd finals	Békéscsaba (2)	3–0	(2) Dorog	Békéscsaba
19:00 CET	Máris 10'; Gránicz 31'; Pantović 51' (pen.)	Report		Stadium: Kórház utcai Stadion; Referee: Balázs Katona

18 September 2021 32nd finals	Tatabánya (3)	3–1	(2) Soroksár	Tatabánya
19:00 CET	Árvai 31'; Farkas 59'; Soltész 83'	Report	Lovrencsics 61'	Stadium: Grosics Gyula Stadion; Referee: Péter Zierkelbach

19 September 2021 32nd finals	Hatvan (4)	0–9	(1) Ferencváros	Hatvan
15:00 CET		Report	Uzuni 34', 40', 50', 59', 76' (pen.), 82'; Gera 70'; Gavrić 74'; Lončar 86'	Stadium: Hatvani Népkert Sporttelep; Referee: János Takács

19 September 2021 32nd finals	Bonyhád (4)	0–1	(2) Pécs	Bonyhád
15:00 CET		Report	Károly 30'	Stadium: VLC Sporttelep; Referee: Tamás Sipos

19 September 2021 32nd finals	Felsőzsolca (4)	0–10	(2) Kecskemét	Felsőzsolca
15:00 CET		Report	Tóth 1'; Puskás 10', 48'; Szalai 17', 23', 27'; Gál 30'; Buna 50'; Szuhodovski 76'; Kis 88'	Stadium: Sportpálya; Referee: Tamás Nazsa

19 September 2021 32nd finals	Zalaszentgrót (4)	0–2	(2) III. Kerület	Zalaszentgrót
15:00 CET		Report	Borvető 62'; Tóth 77'	Stadium: Sporttelep; Referee: Attila Szommer

19 September 2021 32nd finals	Karancslapujtő (4)	0–5	(3) Nagykanizsa	Karancslapujtő
15:00 CET		Report	Béli 61'; Gergász 72' (o.g.); Péntek 80', 87'; Bohata 86' (pen.)	Stadium: KSE Sporttelep; Referee: László Mencsik

19 September 2021 32nd finals	Sárosd (4)	1–3 (a.e.t.)	(3) ESMTK	Sárosd
15:00 CET	Killer 75'	Report	Molnár 38' (pen.), 95', 96'	Stadium: Sportpálya; Referee: András Gáspár

19 September 2021 32nd finals	Ajka (2)	0–1	(1) Gyirmót FC Győr	Ajka
17:00 CET		Report	Medgyes 26'	Stadium: Városi Sportcentrum; Referee: Gábor Barna

19 September 2021 32nd finals	Siófok (2)	0–3	(1) Puskás Akadémia	Siófok
18:00 CET		Report	Júnior 14'; Gera 70'; Kozák 90'	Stadium: Révész Géza utcai Stadion; Referee: Szabolcs Szilasi

19 September 2021 32nd finals	Nyíregyháza (2)	1–5	(1) Honvéd	Balmazújváros
15:00 CET	Banyoi 89'	Report	Balogh 26', 57'; Baráth 38'; Eppel 70'; Batik 81'	Stadium: Balmazújvárosi Városi Sportpálya^{1} Referee: Bence Csonka

Notes

- Note 1: The match between Nyíregyháza Spartacus FC and Honvéd was played at the Balmazújvárosi Városi Sportpálya in Balmazújváros due to the reconstruction of the Városi Stadion in Nyíregyháza.

== Round of 32 ==
27 October 2021 16th finals	Jászberény (C1)	0–1	(2) Vasas	Jászberény
13:30 CET		Report	Balajti 39'	Stadium: Városi Stadion; Attendance: 500; Referee: János Takács

27 October 2021 16th finals	ESMTK (3)	2–4	(2) Békéscsaba	Budapest
13:30 CET	Soós 48', 56'	Report	Gránicz 8', 19'; Ilyés 26'; Pantović 79'	Stadium: ESMTK Stadion; Attendance: 300; Referee: Marcell Derdák

27 October 2021 16th finals	Nagykanizsa (3)	1–0 (a.e.t.)	(3) Tatabánya	Nagykanizsa
13:30 CET	Béli 102'	Report		Stadium: Olajbányász Stadion; Referee: Szabolcs Szilasi

27 October 2021 16th finals	Szegedi VSE (4)	0–2	(3) Cegléd	Szeged
13:30 CET		Report	Szabó 69'; Pleszkán 80'	Stadium: Szegedi VSE Stadion; Referee: Norbert Nagy

27 October 2021 16th finals	Tököl (4)	0–7	(1) Ferencváros	Tököl
13:30 CET		Report	Zubkov 12', 42'; Uzuni 15' (pen.), 19' (pen.); Zachariassen 26', 45'; Mak 83'	Stadium: Városi Sporttelep; Attendance: 2,500; Referee: Tamás Nazsa

27 October 2021 16th finals	Kisvárda (1)	4–1	(1) MTK	Kisvárda
17:00 CET	Camaj 17', 33'; Asani 44'; Zličić 53'	Report	Kocsis 62'	Stadium: Várkerti Stadion; Attendance: 1,100; Referee: Márton Rúsz

27 October 2021 16th finals	Győr (2)	1–0	(1) Puskás Akadémia	Győr
17:00 CET	Vernes 47'	Report		Stadium: ETO Park; Attendance: 650; Referee: Márk Szigetvári

27 October 2021 16th finals	Haladás (2)	0–0 (a.e.t.) (2–3 p)	(1) Gyirmót	Szombathely
18:00 CET		Report		Stadium: Haladás Sportkomplexum; Attendance: 1,310; Referee: Zoltán J. Kovács
	Penalties
	Holdampf (penalty scored); Romić (penalty scored); Németh (penalty missed); Hegedűs (penalty missed); Monori (penalty missed)		Hasani (penalty scored); Nagy (penalty scored); Simon (penalty missed); Hajdú (penalty missed); Szegi (penalty scored)

27 October 2021 16th finals	Budafok (2)	1–2	(1) Újpest	Budafok
18:00 CET	Szalai 64'	Report	Beridze 46' (pen.), 88'	Stadium: Promontor utcai Stadion; Attendance: 1,400; Referee: Gábor Barna

27 October 2021 16th finals	Kecskemét (2)	2–1	(1) Debrecen	Kecskemét
18:00 CET	Szalai 90+3'; Tóth 115'	Report	Németh 83'	Stadium: Széktói Stadion; Attendance: 2,000; Referee: Gábor Oláh

27 October 2021 16th finals	Szeged GA (2)	1–1 (a.e.t.) (3–1 p)	(1) Mezőkövesd	Szeged
18:00 CET	Tóth 31'	Report	Calcan 14'	Stadium: Szent Gellért Fórum; Attendance: 1,000; Referee: Péter Antal
	Penalties
	Haruna (penalty scored); Simon (penalty missed); Vári (penalty scored); Horváth (penalty scored)		Cseri (penalty scored); Dražić (penalty missed); Derekas (penalty missed); Cseke (penalty missed)

27 October 2021 16th finals	Csákvár (2)	2–0	(2) Pécsi MFC	Csákvár
18:00 CET	Mim 18'; Magyar 24'	Report		Stadium: Tersztyánszky Ödön Sportközpont; Attendance: 100; Referee: Sándor Szilágyi

27 October 2021 16th finals	Zalaegerszeg (1)	0–1 (a.e.t.)	(1) Honvéd	Zalaegerszeg
19:30 CET		Report	Nono 109'	Stadium: ZTE Arena; Attendance: 713; Referee: Csaba Pintér

28 October 2021 16th finals	Kazincbarcika (3)	3–2	(2) Diósgyőr	Kazincbarcika
19:30 CET	Székely 19'; Nagy 41'; Vladul 79'	Report	Horváth 28', 82'	Stadium: Kolorcity Arena; Attendance: 951; Referee: Bence Hanyecz

3 November 2021 16th finals	BVSC (3)	2–5	(1) Fehérvár	Budapest
12:30 CET	Szalánszki 80'; Fisli 90+1'	Report	Nikolić 3', 38', 63'; Dárdai 29'; Kodro 69'	Stadium: Szőnyi úti Stadion; Attendance: 300; Referee: Péter Zierkelbach

3 November 2021 16th finals	III. Kerület (2)	0–5	(1) Paks	Budapest
12:30 CET		Report	Böde 4'; Pethő 11'; J. Szabó 13'; Bognár 19' (pen.); R. Nagy 28'	Stadium: Hévízi úti Stadion; Attendance: 447; Referee: Attila Molnár

== Round of 16 ==
5 February 2022 8th finals	Cegléd (3)	0–1	(3) Kazincbarcika	Cegléd
13:00 CET		Report	Ádám 68' (pen.)	Stadium: Malomtó széli stadion Referee: Tamás Takács

8 February 2022 8th finals	Újpest (1)	2–1	(1) Kisvárda	Budapest
17:15 CET	Simon 74'; Csongvai 90+3'	Report	Camaj 68'	Stadium: Szusza Ferenc Stadion; Referee: István Vad II.

8 February 2022 8th finals	Szeged GA (2)	0–3	(1) Fehérvár	Szeged
20:00 CET		Report	Négo 14'; Petryak 16'; Kővári 53' (o.g.)	Stadium: Szent Gellért Fórum; Referee: Gergely Szőtz

9 February 2022 8th finals	Nagykanizsa (3)	2–3	(2) Győr	Nagykanizsa
13:00 CET	Lőrincz 11'; Vlasics 64'	Report	Farkas 39' (pen.), 84', 88'	Stadium: Olajbányász Stadion; Referee: Ádám Radványi

9 February 2022 8th finals	Csákvár (2)	0–2	(1) Paks	Csákvár
17:00 CET		Report	Haraszti 25' (pen.), 70'	Stadium: Tersztyánszky Ödön Sportközpont; Referee: Marcell Derdák

9 February 2022 8th finals	Békéscsaba (2)	3–1	(1) Gyirmót	Békéscsaba
17:00 CET	Ilyés 51'; Granicz 54'; Hodonicki 89'	Report	Ventúra 68'	Stadium: Kórház utcai Stadion; Referee: Péter Antal

9 February 2022 8th finals	Kecskemét (2)	1–2	(1) Honvéd	Kecskemét
17:15 CET	Belényesi 51'	Report	Lukić 60', 78' (pen.)	Stadium: Széktói Stadion; Referee: Bence Csonka

9 February 2022 8th finals	Vasas (2)	0–2	(1) Ferencváros	Budapest
20:00 CET		Report	Botka 9'; Mmaee 73'	Stadium: Illovszky Rudolf Stadion; Referee: Mihály Káprály

== Quarter-finals ==
1 March 2022 Quarter-finals	Kazincbarcika (3)	0–1	(1) Paks	Kazincbarcika
CET		Report	J. Szabó 73'	Stadium: Kolorcity Aréna; Attendance: 900; Referee: Sándor Szilágyi

1 March 2022 Quarter-finals	Honvéd (1)	0–1	(1) Ferencváros	Budapest
CET		Report	Nguen 23'	Stadium: Bozsik Aréna; Attendance: 3,701; Referee: Balázs Berke

2 March 2022 Quarter-finals	Békéscsaba (2)	2–3	(1) Újpest	Békéscsaba
CET	Ilyés 17'; Tóth 77'	Report	Simon 3'; Yahaya 39'; Bjeloš 56'	Stadium: Kórház utcai Stadion; Attendance: 1,920; Referee: Mihály Káprály

3 March 2022 Quarter-finals	Győr (2)	2–1	(1) Fehérvár	Győr
CET	Kiss 71'; Farkas 90+3' (pen.)	Report	Petryak 43'; Fiola (yellow card) 58' (yellow-red card) 72'	Stadium: ETO Park; Attendance: 1,700; Referee: Péter Zierkelbach

== Semi-finals ==
19 April 2022 Semi-finals	Paks (1)	3–0	(1) Újpest	Paks
20:00 CEST	Diaby 28' (o.g.); Windecker 66'; Sajbán 86'	Report		Stadium: Fehérvári úti Stadion; Attendance: 3,214; Referee: Gergő Bogár

20 April 2022 Semi-finals	Győr (2)	1–4	(1) Ferencváros	Győr
20:00 CEST	Bacsa 73'	Report	Boli 23', 52'; Zachariassen 32'; Lipták 78' (o.g.)	Stadium: ETO Park; Attendance: 6,150; Referee: József Erdős

== Final ==
11 May 2022 Final	Ferencváros (1)	3–0	(1) Paks	Budapest
19:30 CEST	Zachariassen 16'; Boli 83', 86'	Report		Stadium: Puskás Aréna; Attendance: 38,979; Referee: Tamás Bognár

== See also ==
- 2021–22 Nemzeti Bajnokság I
- 2021–22 Nemzeti Bajnokság II
- 2021–22 Nemzeti Bajnokság III
