= Michael Oenning =

German football coach and former player (born 1965)

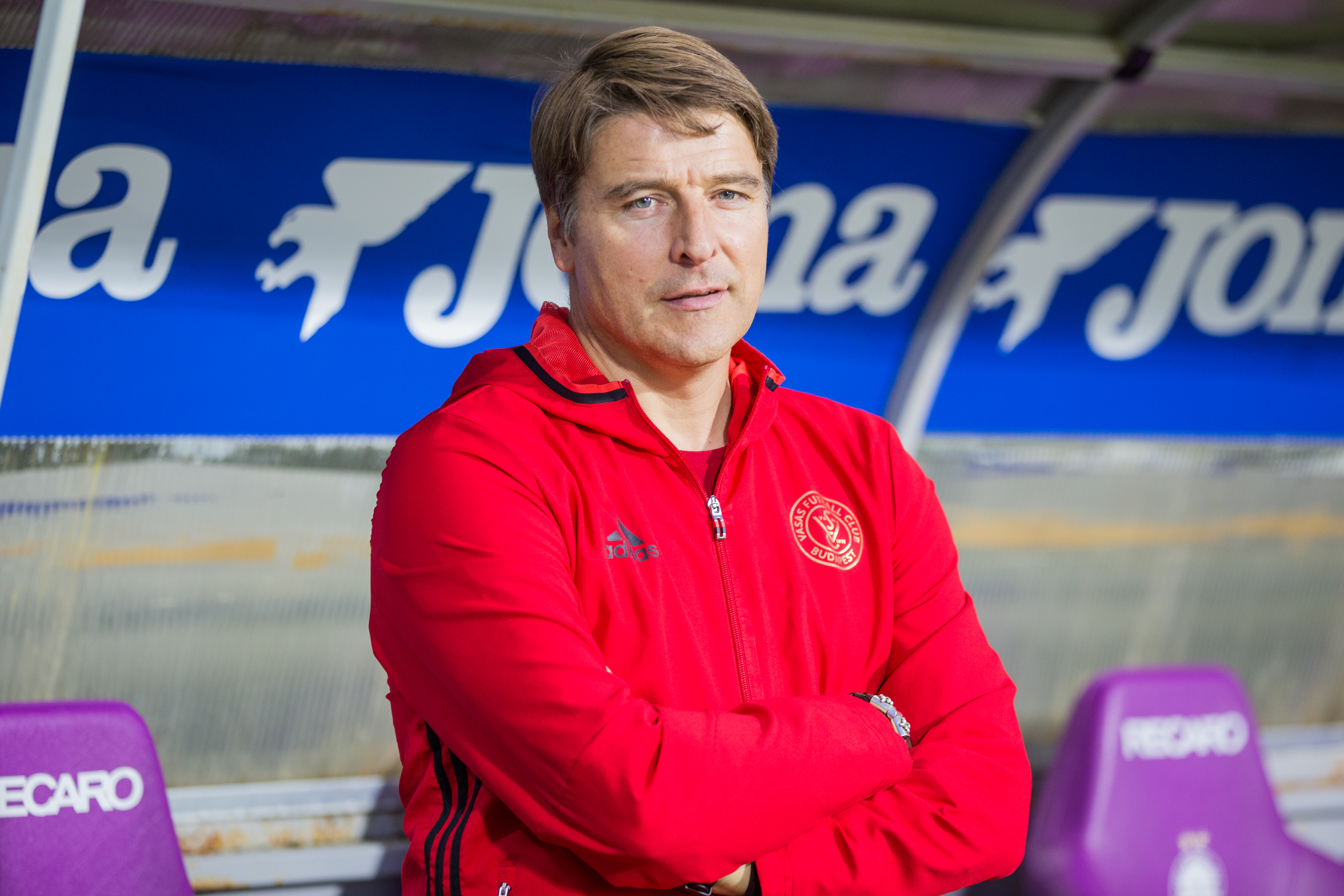
- Oenning with Vasas in 2017

Personal information
- Date of birth: 27 September 1965 (age 61)
- Place of birth: Coesfeld, West Germany
- Position: Midfielder

Youth career
- Eintracht Coesfeld

Senior career*
Years	Team	Apps	(Gls)
- Eintracht Coesfeld
- SV Wilmsberg
- Preußen Münster
1990–1991	Hammer SpVg		
1991–1994	TSG Dülmen		
- SC Pfullendorf

Managerial career
- 2008–2009: 1. FC Nürnberg
- 2011: Hamburger SV
- 2016–2018: Vasas SC
- 2018–2019: 1. FC Magdeburg
- 2019–2020: Aris
- 2020–2021: Újpest
- 2022: Wacker Innsbruck
- 2025: Persepolis (assistant)
- * Club domestic league appearances and goals

Michael Oenning (born 27 September 1965) is a German football coach and former player. He formerly managed Vasas Budapest, Hamburger SV, 1. FC Nürnberg, 1. FC Magdeburg, and Aris.

== Playing career ==
Oenning graduated in German and Sports science. During the 1980s and 1990s he had a playing career, during which he played for Eintracht Coesfeld, SV Wilmsberg, SC Preußen Münster, Hammer SpVg, TSG Dülmen and SC Pfullendorf.

== Managerial career ==
=== Early career ===
In 1999, he started coaching career. Oenning worked as coach employed by Württemberg Football Association, from 1999 until 2004. In 2000, he joined the coaching staff of the German U-18 and U-20 selections, where he was an assistant.

In 2004, he was named an assistant manager to Dick Advocaat in Borussia Mönchengladbach. Oenning worked there until 2005, when he joined Holger Fach and later Klaus Augenthaler in Wolfsburg, also as an assistant. After two seasons, in 2007, Oenning joined VfL Bochum, as their youth coach. During one season, he was working with U-19 selection. Few months after he took a position of Bochum's youth coach, he was sacked.

=== Nürnberg and Hamburg ===
He wasn't unemployed for long, because he joined Thomas von Heesen in February 2008, as his assistant in 1. FC Nürnberg.

Von Heesen and Oenning were working together until 28 August 2008, when Von Heesen got sacked and Oenning replaced him. This was his first experience as head coach. After a slow start in 2. Bundesliga, Oenning was able to guide Nürnberg to a third-place finish and a playoff with 16th place Energie Cottbus. Nürnberg won the playoff 5–0 on aggregate and plays in the Bundesliga since 2009. On 21 December 2009, Oenning was sacked.

Hamburger SV named him an assistant to Armin Veh prior to the 2010–11 Bundesliga season. But after Veh got fired, Oenning became the new head coach. He signed a two-year contract, until June 2013. After a poor start in 2011–12 season that saw Hamburg in last place with only one point out of six games, Oenning was sacked.

=== Vasas ===
On 2 January 2016 Oenning was appointed as the manager of Nemzeti Bajnokság I club Vasas SC.

In the 2015–16 Nemzeti Bajnokság I season Vasas finished 10th and preserved their first league membership, therefore Oenning's contract was prolonged.

In the 2016–17 Nemzeti Bajnokság I season Vasas started with 2 consecutive victories. The team beat MTK Budapest away and Debreceni VSC at home.

=== Magdeburg ===
He was appointed as the head coach of 1. FC Magdeburg on 14 November 2018. He left Magdeburg after the season.

=== Újpest ===
On 23 December 2020 he was appointed as the manager of Nemzeti Bajnokság I club Újpest FC. Oenning won the 2020–21 Magyar Kupa season with Újpest FC by beating Fehérvár FC in the 2021 Magyar Kupa Final at the Puskás Aréna. Although Oenning produced the best results during his career, he was dismissed on 31 December 2021 due to unsatisfactory results. A couple of weeks later, he was replaced by Serbian Miloš Kruščić.

== Managerial statistics ==
As of match played 30 June 2022

Managerial record by team and tenure
Team	From	To	Record					Ref.
Team	From	To	P	W	D	L	Win %	Ref.
1. FC Nürnberg	28 August 2008	21 December 2009	54	21	15	18	38.89	
Hamburger SV	13 March 2011	19 September 2011	15	2	6	7	13.33	
Vasas SC	2 January 2016	6 June 2018	93	35	20	38	37.63	
1. FC Magdeburg	14 November 2018	30 June 2019	21	5	7	9	23.81	
Aris	12 October 2019	18 September 2020	38	13	12	13	34.21	
Újpest	23 December 2020	31 December 2021	34	15	5	14	44.12	
Wacker Innsbruck	28 January 2022	30 June 2022	14	4	4	6	28.57	
Total			295	101	75	119	34.24	—
