= 2021–22 Nemzeti Bajnokság III =

Nemzeti Bajnokság III
- Season: 2021–22
- Champions: Mosonmagyaróvár (West); Kozármisleny (Central); Kazincbarcika (East)

The 2021–22 Nemzeti Bajnokság III is Hungary's third-level football competition.

== Teams ==
The following teams have changed division since the 2020–21 season.

=== Stadium and locations ===
Following is the list of clubs competing in the league this season, with their location, stadium and stadium capacity.

==== Eastern Group ====
Location of teams in 2021–22 Nemzeti Bajnokság III - Eastern Group

Team	Location	Stadium	Capacity
Békéscsaba	Békéscsaba	4-es honvéd utcai pálya	
BKV Előre	Budapest	Sport utcai Stadion	2,500
Debreceni EAC	Debrecen	Dóczy József utcai Sportpálya	3,200
Debrecen II	Debrecen	Dóczy József utcai Sportpálya	3,200
Diósgyőr II	Miskolc (Diósgyőr)	DVTK Stadion II	
Eger	Eger	Szentmarjay Tibor Városi Stadion	3,200
Füzesgyarmat	Füzesgyarmat	Lázár Gyula Sportközpont	2,300
Hajdúszoboszló	Hajdúszoboszló	Bocskai Stadion	3,500
Hidasnémeti	Hidasnémeti	Hidasnémeti Sportpálya	
Jászberény	Jászberény	Városi Stadion	4,000
Kazincbarcika	Kazincbarcika	Pete András Stadion	8,000
Kisvárda II	Kisvárda	Várkerti Stadion	2,993
Putnok	Putnok	Várady Béla Sportközpont	3,000
Salgótarján	Salgótarján	Szojka Ferenc Stadion	7,000
Sényő	Sényő	Sényői Sportpálya	
Tállya	Tállya	Tállyai Sporttelep	2,000
Tiszafüred	Tiszafüred	Lipcsey Elemér Sporttelep	
Tiszaújváros	Tiszaújváros	Tiszaújvárosi Sport Park	4,000
Törökszentmiklós	Törökszentmiklós	Városi Sporttelep	
Újpest FC II	Budapest	Chinoin Sport és Szabadidő Központ	700

==== Centre Group ====
Location of teams in 2020–21 Nemzeti Bajnokság III - Centre Group

Team	Location	Stadium	Capacity
Budapest Honvéd-MFA	Budapest (Kispest)	Magyar Futball Akadémia	
Dabas–Gyón	Dabas	Tatárszentgyörgyi úti pálya	
Dabas	Dabas	Dabasi Sporttelep	2,500
Dunaújváros PASE	Dunaújváros	Eszperantó úti Stadion	12,000
Erzsébeti Spartacus	Budapest (Pesterzsébet)	Ady Endre utcai Stadion	5,000
Ferencváros II	Budapest (Ferencváros)	Sárosi György pálya	3,000
Hódmezővásárhely	Hódmezővásárhely	Városi Stadion	10,000
Iváncsa	Iváncsa	Iváncsai Sportpálya	
Kecskemét	Kecskemét	Széktói Stadion	6,320
Kozármisleny	Kozármisleny	Kozármislenyi Stadion	2,000
Körösladány	Körösladány	Körösladányi Sportálya	
Majos	Bonyhád (Majos)	Majosi Sportpálya	600
Monor	Monor	Balassi Bálint utcai Stadion	2,250
Paks II	Paks	Fehérvári úti Stadion	
Rákosmente	Budapest (Rákosmente)	Pesti úti Sportpálya	1,000
Szegedi VSE	Szeged	Szegedi VSE Stadion	5,000
Szekszárd	Szekszárd	Városi Stadion	7,500
Taksony	Taksony	Taksonyi Sportpálya	
Vác	Vác	Ligeti Stadion	9,000
Újpest II	Budapest (Újpest)	Chinoin Sportközpont	700

==== Western Group ====
Location of teams in 2020–21 Nemzeti Bajnokság III - Western Group

Team	Location	Stadium	Capacity
III. Kerület	Budapest (Óbuda)	Hévízi úti Stadion	914
Balatonfüred	Balatonfüred	Városi Sportpálya	
Bicske	Bicske	Bicskei Sportpálya	
BKV Előre	Budapest	Sport utcai Stadion	2,500
Érd	Érd	Ercsi úti Pálya	3,500
Fehérvár II	Székesfehérvár	Sóstói Stadion, Műfüves	
Gárdony	Gárdony	Agárdi Parkerdő Sportközpont	1,400
Komárom	Komárom	Czibor Zoltán Városi Sporttelep	4,132
Lipót	Lipót	Lipóti Futball Center Edzőközpont	
Ménfőcsanak	Győr	Bezerédi utcai Pálya	
Mosonmagyaróvár	Mosonmagyaróvár	Wittmann Antal park	4,000
Nagyatád	Nagyatád	Mudin Imre Sportcentrum	
Nagykanizsa	Nagykanizsa	Olajbányász Sporttelep	7,000
Pápa	Pápa	Perutz Stadion	5,500
Puskás Akadémia II	Felcsút	PFLA füves IV. pálya	
Sopron	Sopron	Káposztás utcai Stadion	4,500
Szabadkikötő	Budapest (Csepel)	Szabadkikötő Sporttelep	1,000
Tatabánya	Tatabánya	Grosics Gyula Stadion	5,021
Veszprém	Veszprém	Városi Stadion	4,000
Zalaegerszeg II	Zalaegerszeg	ZTE Arena, Műfüves	1,000

=== Personnel and kits ===
==== Eastern Group ====
Team	Head coach	Captain	Kit manufacturer	Shirt sponsor
Balassagyarmat	(Hungary) Tibor Nagy		Adidas	Penta
Budapesti VSC	(Hungary) Krisztián Gabala		Puma	
Cegléd	(Hungary) László Makrai		Joma	Balogh Tészta
Debrecen II	(Hungary) Csaba Szatmári		Adidas	
Eger	(Hungary) Szilárd Sütő		Nike	Apollo Tyres
Füzesgyarmat	(Hungary) Ottó Fábián		Saller	
Gyöngyös	(Hungary) Antal Simon		Joma	Bezzegh
Hatvan	(Hungary) Gábor Gulyás		Joma	
Jászberény	(Hungary) Gyula Németh		Adidas	Jász Plasztik
Kisvárda II	(Hungary) Balázs Szabó		Adidas	MasterGood
Mezőkövesd II	(Hungary) Norbert Elek		Joma	Zsóry Bath
Diósgyőr II	(Hungary) Gyula Zsivóczky-Pandel		2Rule	
Putnok	(Hungary) Balázs Fehér		Adidas	Sajóvölgye Focisuli
Sajóbábony	(Hungary) Ferenc Vígh		Joma	Kis Kft.
Salgótarján	(Hungary) Richárd Rubint		Nike	
Sényő	(Hungary) László Imre		Joma	Magnum-44-Security
Tállya	(Hungary) Attila Uray		Adidas	
Tiszafüred	(Hungary) Tibor Tóth		Adidas	Józsa Kft.
Tiszakécske	(Hungary) Sándor Nagy		2Rule	Duna Aszfalt
Tiszaújváros	(Hungary) Máté Gerliczki		Saller	

== Standings ==
=== Eastern group ===
Pos	Team	Pld	W	D	L	GF	GA	GD	Pts	Promotion or relegation
1	Kazincbarcika	38	32	5	1	106	24	+82	101	Promotion to Nemzeti Bajnokság II
2	Debreceni EAC	38	25	8	5	93	31	+62	83	
3	BKV Előre	38	23	5	10	64	45	+19	74	
4	Hajdúszoboszló	38	20	10	8	74	39	+35	70	
5	Tiszaújváros	38	21	6	11	79	53	+26	69	
6	Kisvárda II	38	19	8	11	67	47	+20	65	
7	Sényő	38	18	8	12	66	59	+7	62	
8	Putnok	38	16	11	11	66	48	+18	59	
9	Újpest II	38	16	9	13	67	53	+14	57	
10	Füzesgyarmat	38	12	15	11	49	53	−4	51	
11	Békéscsaba II	38	14	8	16	82	75	+7	50	
12	Diósgyőr II	38	14	8	16	73	67	+6	50	
13	Tiszafüred	38	13	8	17	57	60	−3	47	
14	Debrecen II	38	13	6	19	63	67	−4	45	
15	Eger	38	13	5	20	47	66	−19	44	
16	Jászberény	38	10	5	23	44	71	−27	35	
17	Salgótarjáni	37	6	10	21	36	64	−28	28	Relegation to Megyei Bajnokság I
18	Hidasnémeti	38	7	6	25	39	109	−70	27	Relegation to Megyei Bajnokság I
19	Tállya	37	5	6	26	27	107	−80	21	Relegation to Megyei Bajnokság I
20	Törökszentmiklós	37	4	9	24	35	91	−56	21	Relegation to Megyei Bajnokság I

Updated to match(es) played on 29 May 2022. Source: Soccerway
Rules for classification: 1) Points; 2) Head-to-head points; 3) Head-to-head goal difference; 4) Head-to-head goals scored; 5) Head-to-head away goals scored; 6) Goal difference; 7) Goals scored.

=== Central group ===
Pos	Team	Pld	W	D	L	GF	GA	GD	Pts	Promotion or relegation
1	Kozármisleny	34	25	9	0	72	19	+53	84	Promotion to Nemzeti Bajnokság II
2	Balassagyarmat	34	21	6	7	59	33	+26	69	
3	Dunaújváros	34	20	9	5	66	34	+32	69	
4	Makó	34	19	5	10	51	24	+27	62	
5	Iváncsa	34	17	8	9	69	37	+32	59	
6	Paks II	34	18	4	12	63	40	+23	58	
7	Budapest Honvéd II	34	18	4	12	54	46	+8	58	
8	Monor	34	17	5	12	50	36	+14	56	
9	MTK Budapest II	34	14	9	11	44	40	+4	51	
10	Ferencváros II	34	14	7	13	47	48	−1	49	
11	Hódmezővásárhely	34	14	6	14	50	57	−7	48	
12	ESMTK	34	13	7	14	49	40	+9	46	
13	Dabas	34	11	10	13	59	53	+6	43	
14	Szekszárd	34	11	8	15	45	47	−2	41	
15	Cegléd	34	10	6	18	36	62	−26	36	
16	Vác	34	9	8	17	39	57	−18	35	
17	Dabas–Gyón	34	6	8	20	26	66	−40	26	Relegation to Megyei Bajnokság I
18	Mohács	34	6	5	23	28	67	−39	23	Relegation to Megyei Bajnokság I
19	Rákosmente	34	6	4	24	35	76	−41	22	Relegation to Megyei Bajnokság I
20	Gerjen	34	5	4	25	24	79	−55	19	Relegation to Megyei Bajnokság I

Updated to match(es) played on 5 May 2022. Source: Soccerway
Rules for classification: 1) Points; 2) Head-to-head points; 3) Head-to-head goal difference; 4) Head-to-head goals scored; 5) Head-to-head away goals scored; 6) Goal difference; 7) Goals scored.

=== Western group ===
Pos	Team	Pld	W	D	L	GF	GA	GD	Pts	Promotion or relegation
1	Mosonmagyaróvár	34	28	4	2	102	18	+84	88	Promotion to Nemzeti Bajnokság II
2	BVSC Budapest	34	27	3	4	88	26	+62	84	
3	Veszprém	34	24	5	5	64	23	+41	77	
4	Győr II	34	18	7	9	59	39	+20	61	
5	Bicske	34	15	13	6	43	33	+10	58	
6	Puskás Akadémia II	34	15	11	8	55	35	+20	56	
7	Pápa	34	15	7	12	45	38	+7	52	
8	Tatabánya	34	13	11	10	44	39	+5	50	
9	Kaposvár	34	12	10	12	44	43	+1	46	
10	Fehérvár II	34	12	10	12	40	49	−9	46	
11	Nagykanizsa	34	13	5	16	49	62	−13	44	
12	Érd	34	12	6	16	50	60	−10	42	
13	Zalaegerszeg II	34	11	9	14	51	55	−4	42	
14	Gyirmót II	34	11	5	18	57	65	−8	38	
15	Balatonfüred	34	10	8	16	47	61	−14	38	
16	Kelen	34	9	10	15	38	47	−9	37	
17	Komárom	34	7	10	17	47	62	−15	31	Relegation to Megyei Bajnokság I
18	Sopron	33	7	5	21	33	72	−39	26	Relegation to Megyei Bajnokság I
19	Gárdony	34	5	4	25	28	66	−38	19	Relegation to Megyei Bajnokság I
20	Andráshida	34	2	5	27	21	112	−91	11	Relegation to Megyei Bajnokság I

Updated to match(es) played on 5 May 2022. Source: Soccerway
Rules for classification: 1) Points; 2) Head-to-head points; 3) Head-to-head goal difference; 4) Head-to-head goals scored; 5) Head-to-head away goals scored; 6) Goal difference; 7) Goals scored.

== See also ==
- 2021–22 Magyar Kupa
- 2021–22 Nemzeti Bajnokság I
- 2021–22 Nemzeti Bajnokság II
- 2021–22 Megyei Bajnokság I
