= 2021 Magyar Kupa final =

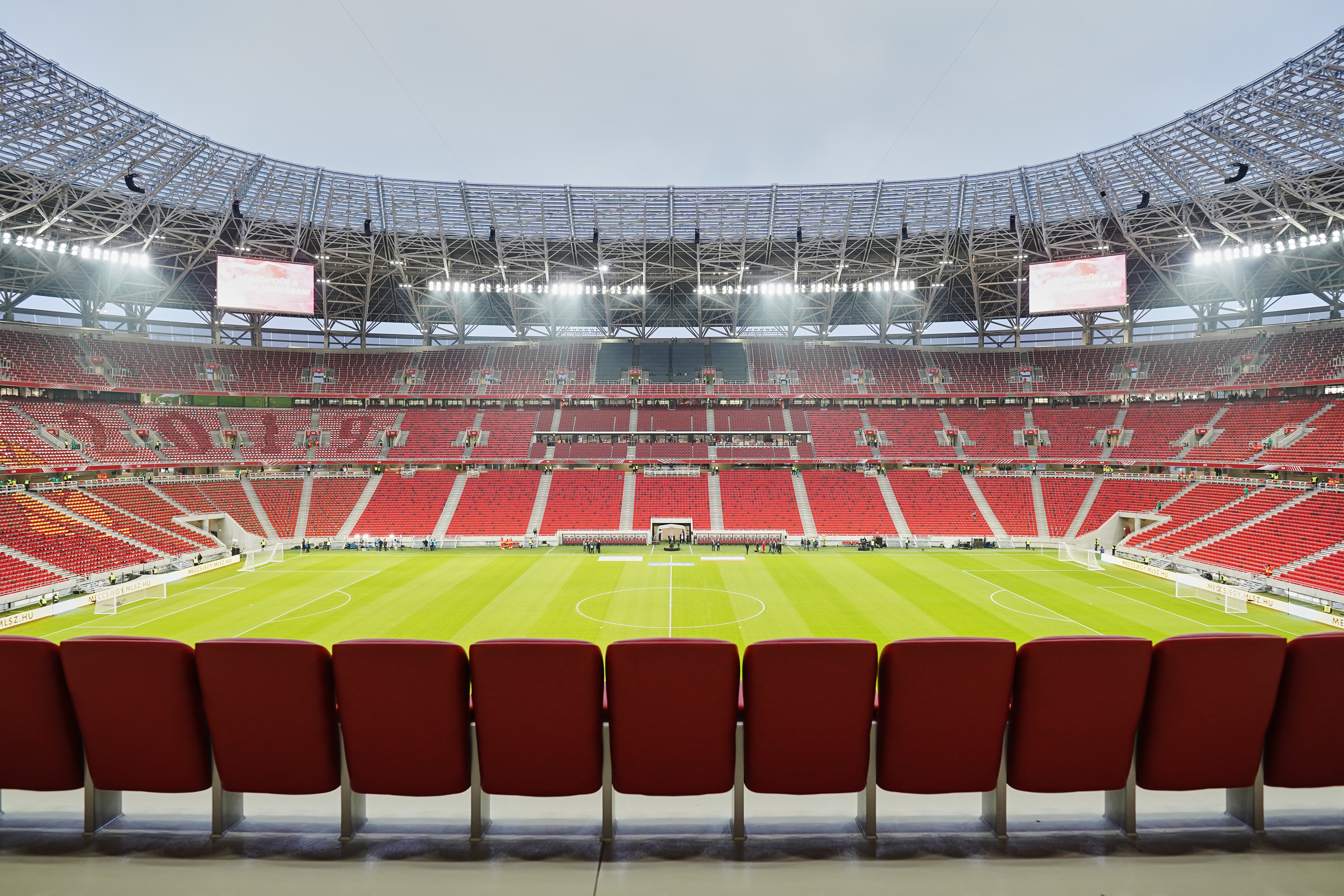
- The Puskás Aréna in Budapest hosted the final.
- Event: 2020–21 Magyar Kupa
Fehérvár	Újpest
0	1
- After extra time
- Date: 3 May 2021
- Venue: Puskás Aréna, Budapest
- Referee: Gergő Bogár
- Attendance: 4,500

The 2021 Magyar Kupa final was the final match of the 2020–21 Magyar Kupa, played between Fehérvár and Újpest on 3 May 2021 at the Puskás Aréna in Budapest, Hungary.

== Teams ==
Team	Previous finals appearances (bold indicates winners)
Fehérvár	6 (1982, 2001, **2006**, 2011, 2015, **2019**)
Újpest	17 (1922, 1923, 1925, 1927, 1933, **1969**, **1970**, **1975**, **1982**, **1983**, **1987**, **1992**, 1998, **2002**, **2014**, 2016, **2018**)

== Route to the final ==
Note: In all results below, the score of the finalist is given first (H: home; A: away).

Fehérvár		Round	Újpest	
Opponent	Result		Opponent	Result
Tiszaföldvár (MB I)	5–0 (A)	Round of 128	Iváncsa (NB III)	4–0 (A)
Gárdony (NB III)	4–1 (A)	Round of 64	Dunaújváros (NB III)	6–0 (A)
Vasas (NB II)	2–1 (A)	Round of 32	Szolnok (NB II)	2–0 (A)
Ferencváros (NB I)	2–1 (A)	Round of 16	Puskás Akadémia (NB I)	2–1 (A)
Budafok (NB I)	2–0 (H)	Quarter-finals	Mezőkövesd (NB I)	1–1 (a.e.t.) (5–4 p) (H)
MTK Budapest (NB I)	2–1 (A)	Semi-finals	Kisvárda (NB I)	1–0 (A)

== Match ==
3 May 2021
20:00 CEST

Fehérvár	0–1 (a.e.t.)	Újpest
	Report	Kastrati 101'

Puskás Aréna, Budapest
Attendance: 4,500
Referee: Gergő Bogár

**Fehérvár**	**Újpest**

GK	1	(Hungary) Dániel Kovács
DF	22	(Cape Verde) Stopira
DF	6	(North Macedonia) Visar Musliu
DF	4	(Romania) Adrian Rus	(yellow card) 45' (yellow-red card) 90+1'
DF	77	(Hungary) Bendegúz Bolla		(substituted off) 62'
MF	7	(Ukraine) Ivan Petryak
MF	21	(Portugal) Rúben Pinto
MF	11	(Hungary) Loïc Négo
MF	70	(Nigeria) Funsho Bamgboye	(yellow card) 59'	(substituted off) 91'
FW	9	(Georgia (country)) Budu Zivzivadze
FW	17	(Hungary) Nemanja Nikolić		(substituted off) 77'
Substitutes:
GK	97	(Romania) Árpád Tordai
DF	5	(Hungary) Attila Fiola		(substituted on) 62'
MF	8	(Belgium) Samy Bourard
MF	10	(Hungary) István Kovács
MF	19	(Hungary) Péter Kövesdi
MF	20	(Brazil) Evandro
MF	23	(Hungary) Palkó Dárdai
FW	27	(Hungary) Levente Szabó
MF	85	(Hungary) Olivér Dinnyés
MF	88	(Hungary) Marcell Papp
MF	95	(Brazil) Alef	(yellow card) 96' (yellow-red card) 97'	(substituted on) 91'
MF	96	(France) Lyes Houri		(substituted on) 77'
Manager:
(Hungary) Imre Szabics

GK	1	(Serbia) Filip Pajović
DF	13	(Greece) Georgios Koutroumpis		(substituted off) 102'
DF	62	(Kosovo) Lirim Kastrati
DF	4	(North Macedonia) Kire Ristevski
MF	21	(Serbia) Nemanja Antonov	(yellow card) 119'
MF	30	(Nigeria) Vincent Onovo	(yellow card) 44'
MF	24	(France) Yohan Croizet		(substituted off) 74'
MF	22	(Serbia) Nikola Mitrović	(yellow card) 45+1'
MF	49	(Serbia) Branko Pauljević		(substituted off) 118'
FW	11	(Ivory Coast) Junior Tallo		(substituted off) 114'
FW	17	(Georgia (country)) Giorgi Beridze		(substituted off) 114'
Substitutes:
GK	23	(Hungary) Dávid Banai
DF	3	(Montenegro) Jovan Baošić	(red card) 68'
DF	5	(Hungary) Zsolt Máté		(substituted on) 118'
MF	7	(Hungary) Krisztián Simon		(substituted on) 114'
FW	9	(Hungary) Patrik Bacsa
MF	14	(Hungary) Áron Csongvai		(substituted on) 74'
MF	15	(Serbia) Miroslav Bjeloš
DF	19	(Portugal) Mauro Cerqueira
MF	27	(Hungary) Mátyás Katona
FW	33	(Hungary) Márk Mucsányi
MF	55	(Hungary) Péter Szakály		(substituted on) 102'
FW	77	(Croatia) Antonio Perošević		(substituted on) 114'
Manager:
(Germany) Michael Oenning
