= Kelenföld =

Neighborhood in Budapest, Hungary

Coordinates: 47°28′N 19°03′E

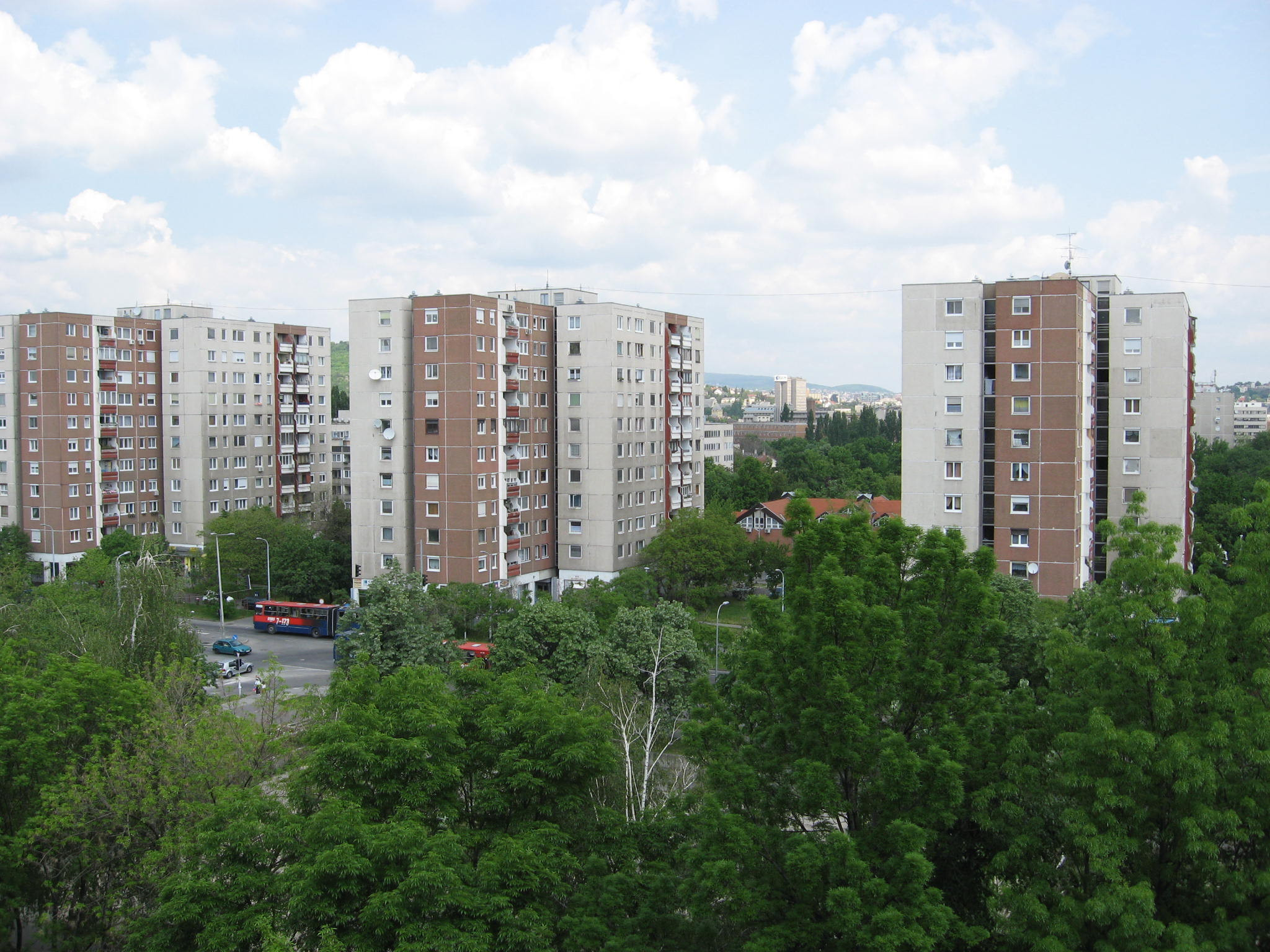
Tower blocks in Kelenföld housing estate (built at the end of the 1960s)

Kelenföld (German: Krenfeld) is a neighborhood in Budapest, Hungary. It belongs to Újbuda, and located in the southern part of Buda. The large Kelenföld housing estate was built between 1967 and 1983 from pre-fabricated concrete blocks. The older streets around Bocskai út were mainly built in the first half of the 20th century. The Budapest-Kelenföld railway station is an important transport hub of Buda, especially since 2014, when it gained convenient access to the city center thanks to the newly opened Metro Line M4. Kelenföld Power Station, the largest electrical generation plant in the world after its construction in 1912, is now a tourist attraction and has received coverage in the English-speaking world in recent years thanks in part to its Art Deco control room.

== Location ==
Kelenföld is located on the plain of southern Buda, next to the river Danube.

The borders of Kelenföld are: Villányi út from Budaörsi út – Móricz Zsigmond körtér (southwestern side) – Fehérvári út – Hegyeshalom railway line – Danube – Kondorosi út – Solt utca – Kelenvölgyi határsor – Hegyeshalom railway line – underground passage in Nagyszőlős utca - Budaörsi út

== Name ==
The area was called Krenfeld in the 18th century meaning "Horseradish Meadows" in German. It was named Kelenföld in 1847 referring to Kelen, an early Hungarian chieftain in the 9th century.

== Sport ==
The association football clubs, Kelen SC and Kelenföldi Textilgyár SE, are based in the town.

== Images ==
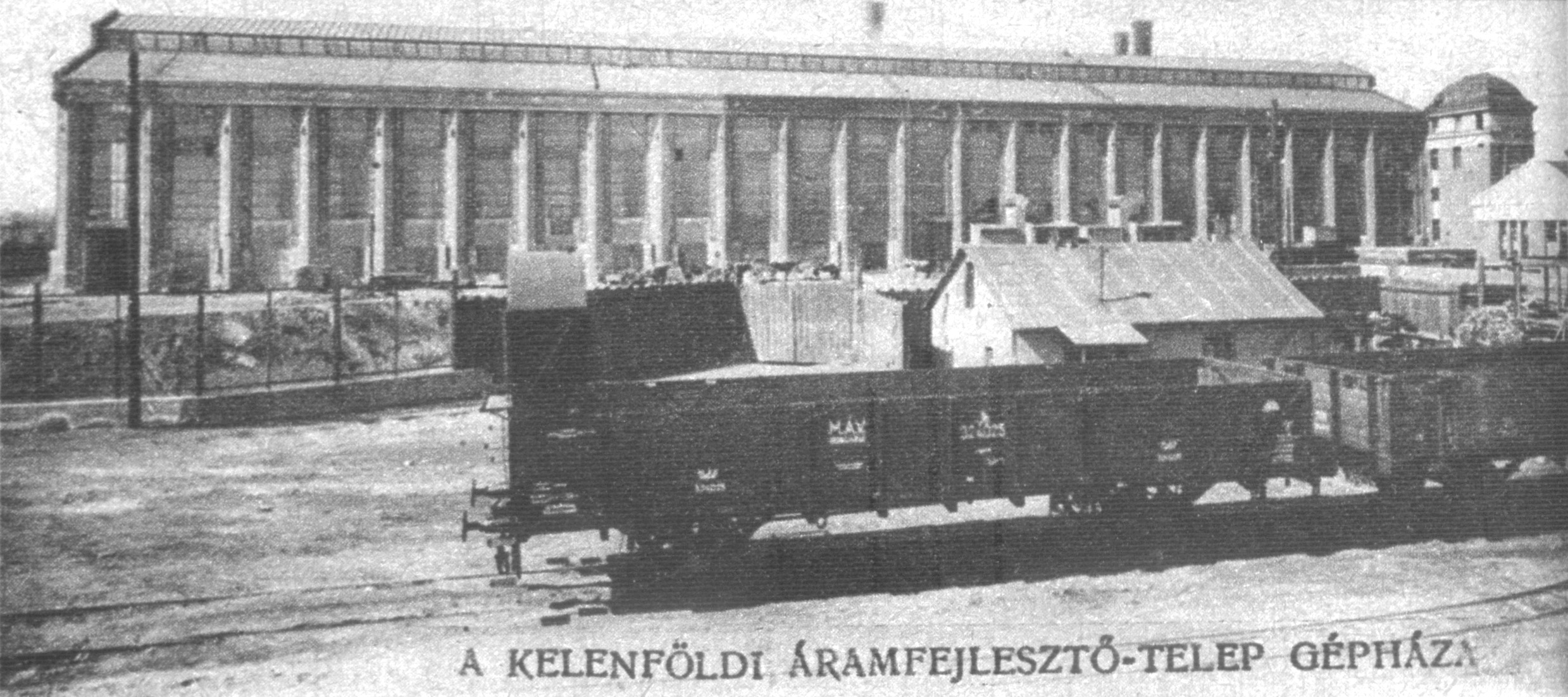
1920

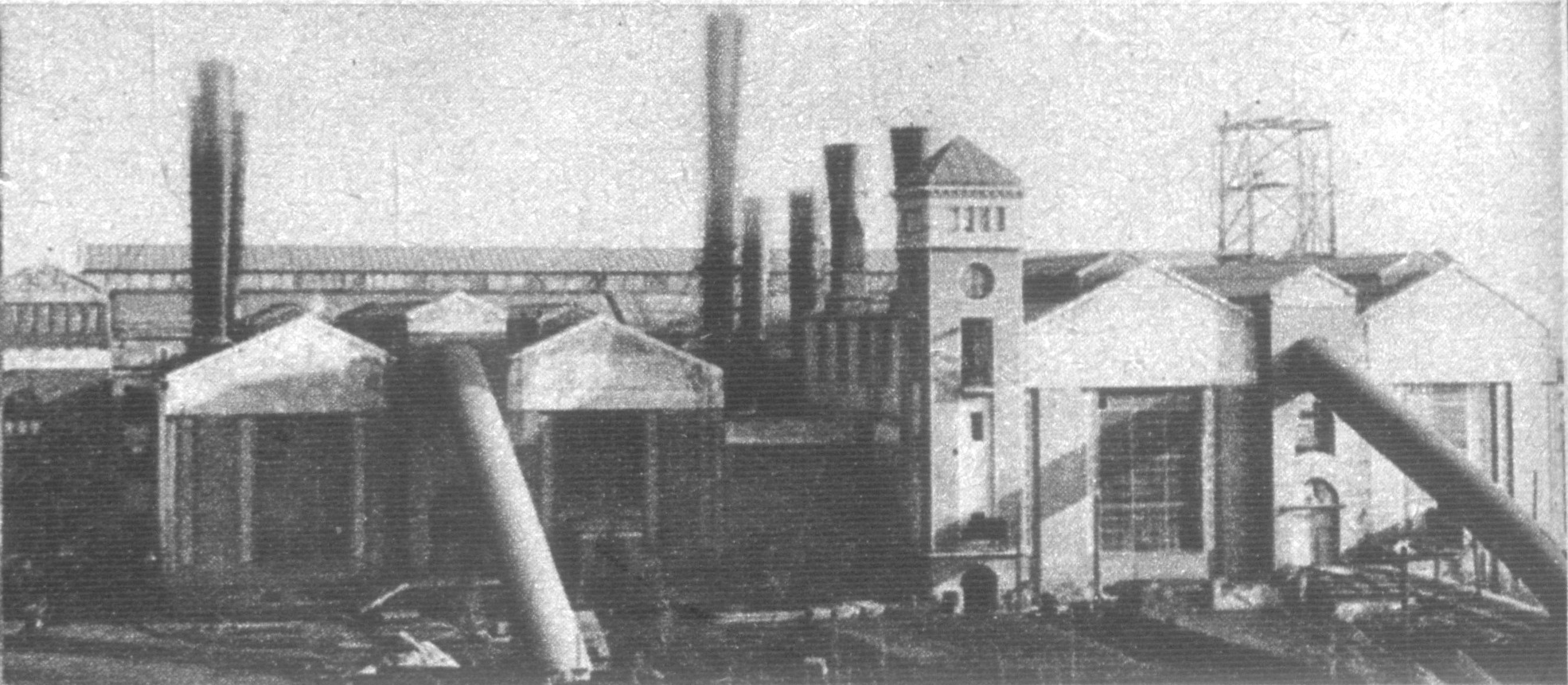
Kelenföld Power Station, 1920

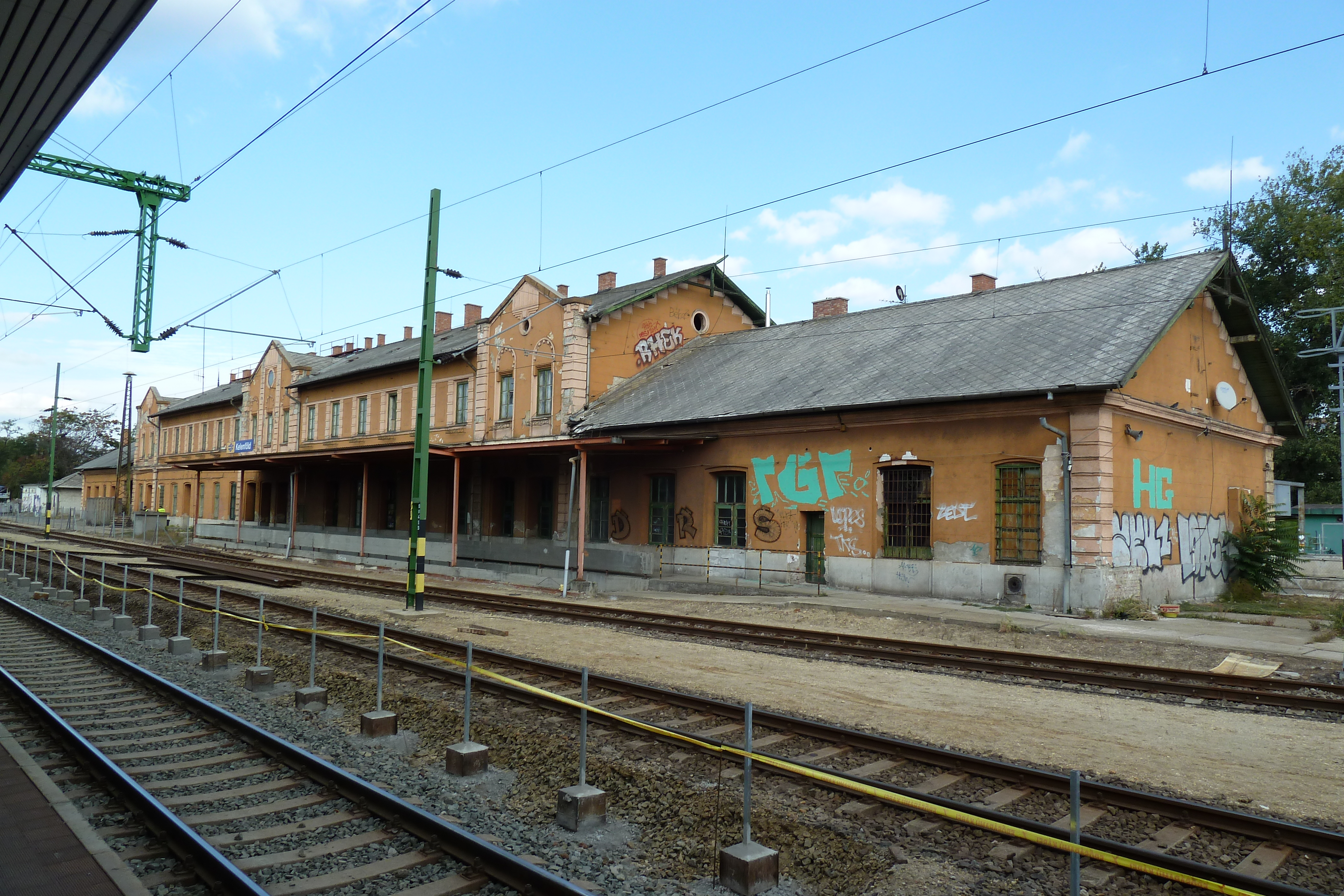
Kelenföld railway station

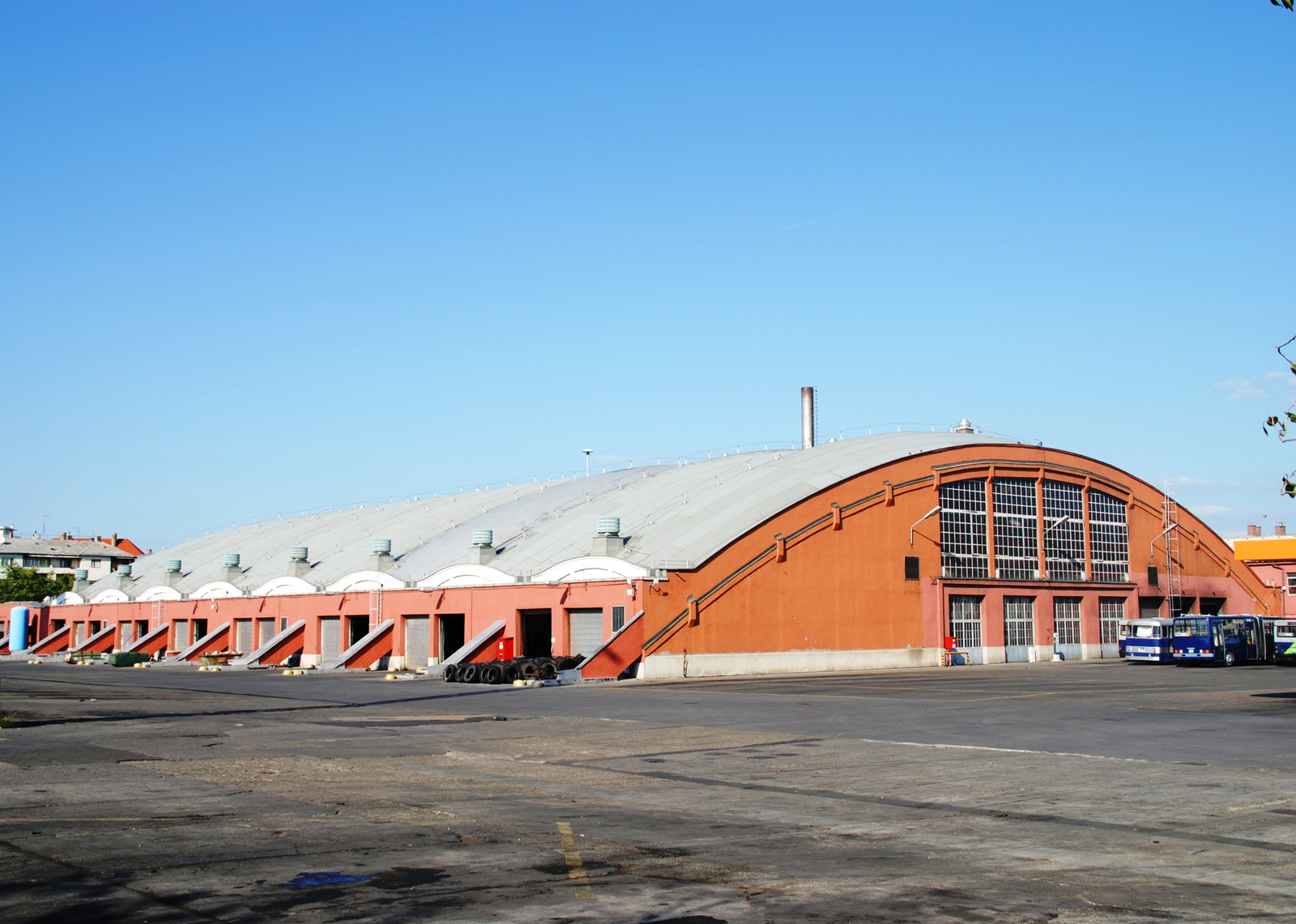

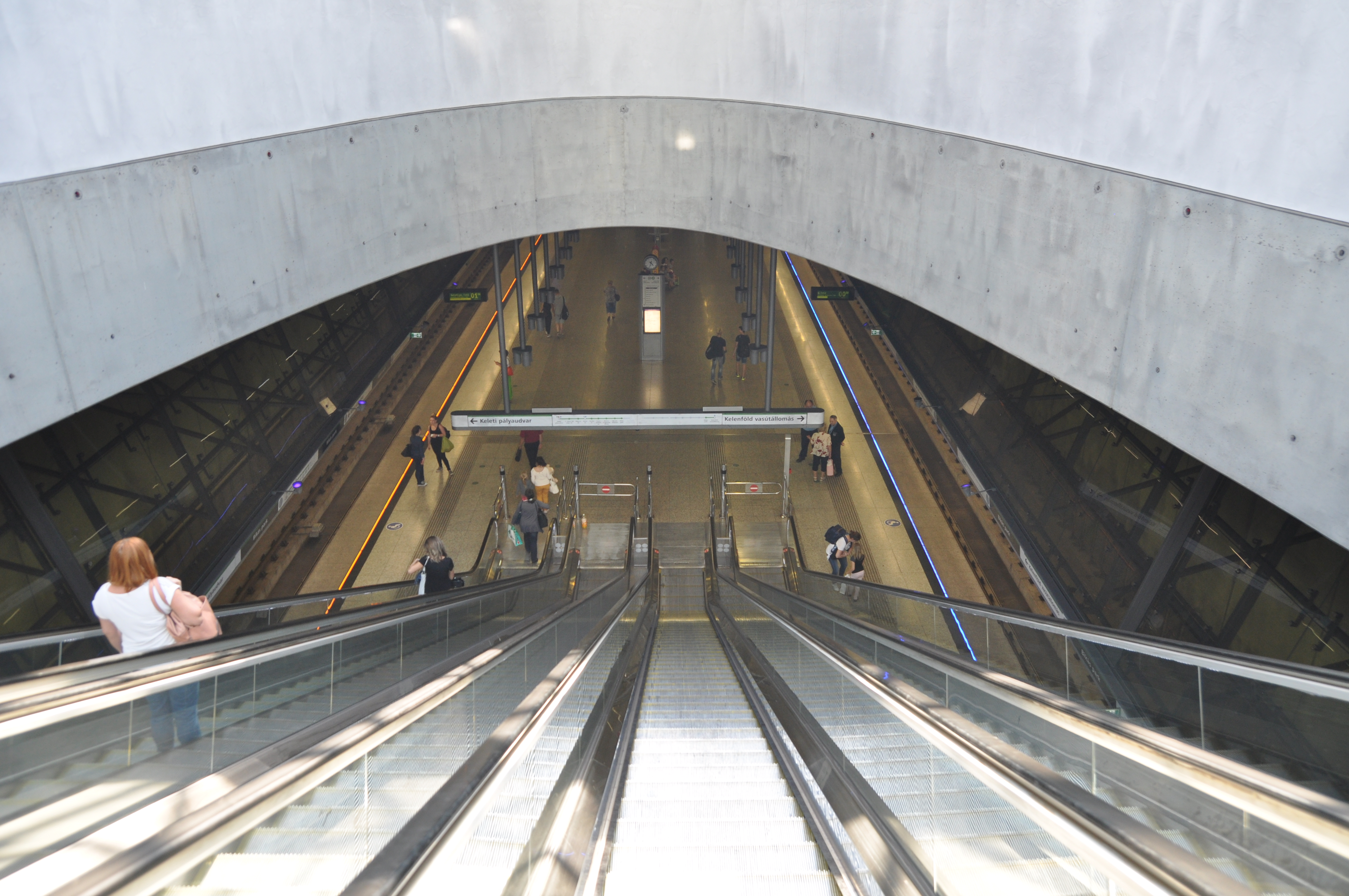
Budapest, metró 4, Bikás park
