= Kelen SC =

Hungarian football club

- Full name: Kelen Sport Club
- Founded: 1926; 100 years ago
- Ground: Hunyadi Mátyás utcai Stadion
- Manager: Ákos Simon
- League: NB III; Northwest
- 2023–24: NB III; Northwest, 13th of 16
- Website: https://kelensc.hu/
Home colours	Away colours

Kelen Sport Club is a professional football club based in Kelenföld, Budapest, Hungary, that competes in the Nemzeti Bajnokság III, the third tier of Hungarian football.

== History ==
On 14 September 2024, they were eliminated by Budapest Honvéd FC from the 2024–25 Magyar Kupa season. The match ended with a 5-1 defeat.

== Season results ==
As of 15 August 2021

Domestic												International		Manager	Ref.
Nemzeti Bajnokság											Magyar Kupa	International		Manager	Ref.
Div.	No.	Season	MP	W	D	L	GF–GA	Dif.	Pts.	Pos.	Magyar Kupa	Competition	Result	Manager	Ref.
III	?.	2021–22	0	0	0	0	0–0	+0	0	TBD	TBD	Did not qualify			
