= Gerjen =

- Location of Tolna county in Hungary

- Location of Gerjen
- Coordinates: 46.49112°N 18.90278°E
- Country: Hungary
- County: Tolna

Area
  - Total: 36.28 km^{2} (14.01 sq mi)

Population (2004)
  - Total: 1,316
  - Density: 36.27/km^{2} (93.9/sq mi)
- Time zone: UTC+1 (CET)
  - Summer (DST): UTC+2 (CEST)
- Postal code: 7134
- Area code: 75

Gerjen is a village in Tolna County, Hungary.

== Sport ==
The association football club, Gerjeni SK, is based in the town.
