= Törökszentmiklósi FC =

Hungarian football club

- Full name: Törökszentmiklósi Football Club
- Founded: 1977; 49 years ago
- League: NB III
Home colours

Törökszentmiklósi Football Club is a professional football club based in Törökszentmiklós, Hungary, that competes in the Nemzeti Bajnokság III, the third tier of Hungarian football.

== Honours ==
=== League ===
- Megyei Bajnokság I:
  - Winners (1): 2024–25

== Seasons ==
The table below shows the seasons of Törökszentmiklósi FC.

| Season | Tier | Club's name | Position | Pts |
|---|---|---|---|---|
| 1977–78 | 4 | Törökszentmiklósi SE | 2 / 18 | 50 |
| 1978–79 | 3 | Törökszentmiklós | 3 / 18 | 50 |
| 1979–80 | 3 | Törökszentmiklós | 2 / 18 | 53 |
| 1980–81 | 3 | Törökszentmiklósi SE | 1 / 18 | 53 |
| 1981–82 | 3 | Törökszentmiklósi SE | 13 / 16 | 23 |
| 1982–83 | 4 | Törökszentmiklós | 6 / 18 | 38 |
| 1983–84 | 4 | Törökszentmiklós | 2 / 18 | 50 |
| 1984–85 | 4 | Törökszentmiklós | 3 / 18 | 43 |
| 1985–86 | 4 | Törökszentmiklós | 7 / 18 | 34 |
| 1986–87 | 4 | Törökszentmiklós | 1 / 16 | 50 |
| 1987–88 | 3 | Törökszentmiklósi SE | 11 / 16 | 26 |
| 1988–89 | 3 | Törökszentmiklósi SE | 9 / 16 | 44 |
| 1989–90 | 3 | Törökszentmiklós | 10 / 16 | 44 |
| 1990–91 | 3 | Törökszentmiklós | 6 / 16 | 33 |
| 1991–92 | 3 | Törökszentmiklós | 12 / 16 | 23 |
| 1992–93 | 3 | Törökszentmiklósi SE | 13 / 16 | 23 |
| 1993–94 | 3 | Törökszentmiklósi SE | 16 / 16 | 3 |
| 1994–95 | 4 | Törökszentmiklósi SE | 7 / 18 | 56 |
| 1995–96 | 4 | Törökszentmiklósi SE | 8 / 18 | 45 |
| 1996–97 | 4 | Törökszentmiklós | 3 / 16 | 59 |
| 1997–98 | 5 | Törökszentmiklós | 14 / 16 | 23 |
| 1998–99 | 5 | Törökszentmiklós | 4 / 16 | 55 |
| 1999–00 | 5 | Törökszentmiklós | 10 / 16 | 37 |
| 2000–01 | 5 | Törökszentmiklós | 4 / 16 | 65 |
| 2001–02 | 5 | Törökszentmiklós | 5 / 16 | 48 |
| 2002–03 | 5 | Törökszentmiklós | 11 / 16 | 38 |
| 2003–04 | 5 | Törökszentmiklós | 3 / 16 | 51 |
| 2005–06 | 6 | Törökszentmiklós | 1 / 16 | 76 |
| 2006–07 | 5 | Törökszentmiklósi FC | 1 / 16 | 67 |
| 2007–08 | 4 | Törökszentmiklósi FC | 14 / 18 | 33 |
| 2008–09 | 4 | Törökszentmiklós FC | 16 / 18 | 35 |
| 2009–10 | 5 | Törökszentmiklósi FC | 2 / 18 | 75 |
| 2010–11 | 4 | Törökszentmiklósi FC | 4 / 16 | 53 |
| 2011–12 | 4 | Törökszentmiklósi FC | 5 / 16 | 55 |
| 2012–13 | 4 | Törökszentmiklósi FC | 4 / 16 | 52 |
| 2013–14 | 4 | Törökszentmiklósi FC | 5 / 16 | 46 |
| 2014–15 | 4 | Törökszentmiklósi FC | 7 / 16 | 38 |
| 2015–16 | 4 | Törökszentmiklósi FC | 2 / 16 | 60 |
| 2016–17 | 4 | Törökszentmiklósi FC | 6 / 16 | 57 |
| 2017–18 | 4 | Törökszentmiklósi FC | 8 / 16 | 51 |
| 2018–19 | 4 | Törökszentmiklósi FC | 2 / 16 | 65 |
| 2019–20 | 4 | Törökszentmiklósi FC | 2 / 15 | 43 |
| 2020–21 | 4 | Törökszentmiklósi FC | 1 / 15 | 70 |
| 2021–22 | 3 | Törökszentmiklósi FC-Veteriner | 20 / 20 | 21 |
| 2022–23 | 4 | Törökszentmiklósi FC-Veteriner | 3 / 16 | 54 |
| 2023–24 | 4 | Törökszentmiklósi FC-Veteriner | 5 / 16 | 62 |
| 2024–25 | 4 | Törökszentmiklósi FC-Veteriner | 1 / 16 | 77 |
| 2025–26 | 4 | Törökszentmiklósi FC-Veteriner | 4 / 16 | 59 |
