= Gerjeni SK =

Hungarian football club

- Full name: Gerjeni Sport Klub
- Founded: 1951; 74 years ago
- League: NB III
Home colours

Gerjeni Sport Klub is a professional football club based in Gerjen, Hungary, that competes in the Nemzeti Bajnokság III, the third tier of Hungarian football.

== Season results ==
As of 15 August 2021

| Domestic | | | | | | | | | | | | International | | Manager | Ref. |
| Nemzeti Bajnokság | | | | | | | | | | | Magyar Kupa | International | | Manager | Ref. |
| Div. | No. | Season | MP | W | D | L | GF–GA | Dif. | Pts. | Pos. | Magyar Kupa | Competition | Result | Manager | Ref. |
|---|---|---|---|---|---|---|---|---|---|---|---|---|---|---|---|
| III | ?. | 2021–22 | 0 | 0 | 0 | 0 | 0–0 | +0 | 0 | TBD | TBD | Did not qualify | | | |
