= Hidasnémeti VSC =

Hungarian football club

- Full name: Hidasnémeti Vasutas Sport Club
- Founded: 1949; 76 years ago
- League: NB III
Home colours

Hidasnémeti Vasutas Sport Club is a professional football club based in Hidasnémeti, Hungary, that competes in the Nemzeti Bajnokság III, the third tier of Hungarian football.

== Season results ==
As of 15 August 2021

Domestic												International		Manager	Ref.
Nemzeti Bajnokság											Magyar Kupa	International		Manager	Ref.
Div.	No.	Season	MP	W	D	L	GF–GA	Dif.	Pts.	Pos.	Magyar Kupa	Competition	Result	Manager	Ref.
III	?.	2021–22	0	0	0	0	0–0	+0	0	TBD	TBD	Did not qualify			
