= Zalaszentgróti VFC =

Football club in Hungary

- Full name: Zalaszentgróti Városi Futball Club
- Founded: 1921; 104 years ago
- Ground: Zalaszentgróti Sportpálya
- League: Megyei Bajnokság I, Zala
- 2019–20: MB I, Zala, 8th
Home colours

Zalaszentgróti VFC is a football club based in Zalaszentgrót, Hungary. The team competes in the Megyei Bajnokság I, the fourth tier of Hungarian football.

== Name changes ==
- 1920–?: Zalaszentgróti SE
- ?-1945: Zalaszentgróti Levente Egyesület
- 1945–1948: Zalaszentgróti SE
- 1948–1950: Zalaszentgróti EPOSz
- 1950–1951: Zalaszentgróti DISz
- 1951–1964: Zalaszentgróti Traktor
- 1964–1994: Zalaszentgróti Spartacus SE
- 1994–2015: Zalaszentgróti Városi Futball Club
- 2015–2017: Tisza-Ép Sipospékség Zalaszentgróti Városi Futball Club
- 2017–2018: Tisza-Ép Zalaszentgróti Városi Futball Club
- 2018–present: Zalaszentgróti Városi Futball Club

== Honours ==
- Megyei Bajnokság I, Zala:
  - Champion: 2012–13
