= Hidasnémeti =

- Village
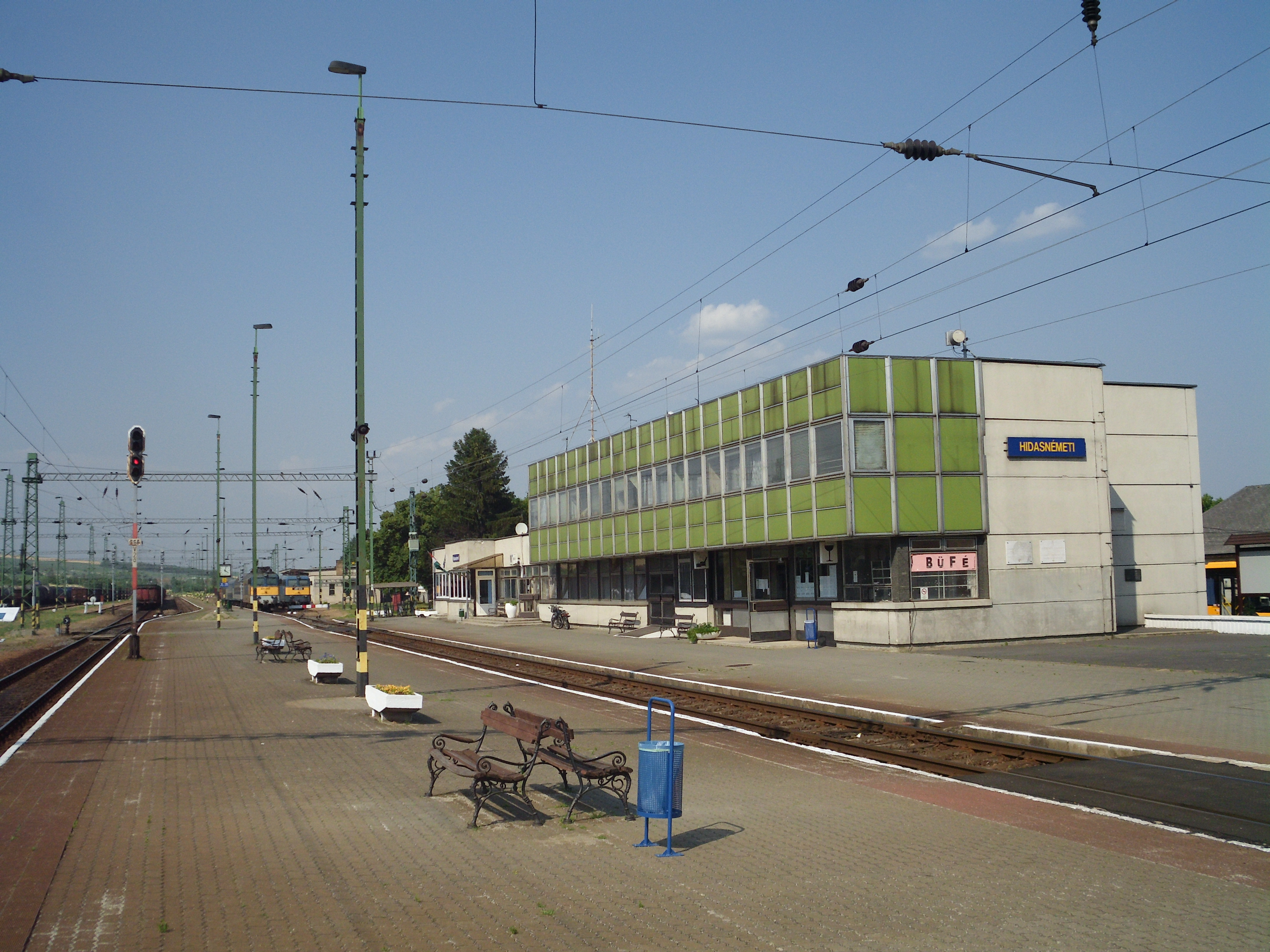

- Flag Coat of arms

- Location of Hidasnémeti
- Coordinates: 48.49947°N 21.229°E
- Country: Hungary
- Region: Northern Hungary
- County: Borsod-Abaúj-Zemplén
- District: Gönc

Area
  - Total: 16.08 km^{2} (6.21 sq mi)

Population (1 January 2025)
  - Total: 977
  - Density: 60.8/km^{2} (157/sq mi)
- Time zone: UTC+1 (CET)
  - Summer (DST): UTC+2 (CEST)
- Postal code: 3876
- Area code: (+36) 46
- Website: hidasnemeti.hu

Hidasnémeti is a village in Borsod-Abaúj-Zemplén County in northeastern Hungary.

== Sport ==
The association football club, Hidasnémeti VSC, is based in the town.
