= 2026–27 Megyei Bajnokság I =

Megyei Bajnokság I
- Season: 2026–27

The 2026–27 Megyei Bajnokság I includes the championships of 20 counties in Hungary (including Budapest). It is the fourth tier of the Hungarian football league system.

== Teams ==
The following teams have changed division since the 2025–26 season.

County	To Megyei Bajnokság I			From Megyei Bajnokság I					Ref.
County	Relegated from Nemzeti Bajnokság III	Promoted from Megyei Bajnokság II	Invited	Promoted to Nemzeti Bajnokság III	Relegated to			Dissolved	Ref.
County	Relegated from Nemzeti Bajnokság III	Promoted from Megyei Bajnokság II	Invited	Promoted to Nemzeti Bajnokság III	Megyei Bajnokság II	Megyei Bajnokság III	Megyei Bajnokság IV	Dissolved	Ref.
Bács-Kiskun	—N/a				Bácsalmás	Hírös-Ép	—N/a		
Baranya	—N/a								
Békés	—N/a	Mezőberény; Végegyháza	—N/a		Füzesgyarmat	—N/a		Mezőhegyes	
Borsod-Abaúj-Zemplén	Putnok	Sárospatak	—N/a			Izsófalva	—N/a	Bánhorváti-Sajóvölgye	
Budapest	Pénzügyőr	II. Kerület; Mészöly	—N/a	SZAC	Ludovika; Nagytétény	—N/a			
Csongrád-Csanád	—N/a	Balástya; Mindszent	—N/a	Sándorfalva	Csongrád	—N/a	Hódmezővásárhelyi TUS	—N/a	
Fejér	—N/a			Sárbogárd	Enying; Videoton Baráti Kör	—N/a			
Győr-Moson-Sopron	—N/a	DAC-UP; Lébény	—N/a		Fertőszentmiklós; Ménfőcsanak	—N/a			
Hajdú-Bihar	—N/a	Ebes; Hajdúdorog; Józsa	—N/a	Hajdúnánás	—N/a	Kaba	—N/a	Nyíradony	
Heves	Hatvan	Bélkő; Heréd	Eger II	—N/a	Heves	—N/a			
Jász-Nagykun-Szolnok	Tiszaföldvár	Fegyvernek	—N/a	Szolnok	—N/a	Jánoshida	—N/a	Kenderes	
Komárom-Esztergom	Zsámbék	—N/a	Dorog II; Sárisáp II	Sárisáp	Lábatlan; Vértesszőlős	—N/a		Esztergom	
Nógrád	—N/a	Romhány	—N/a	Salgótarján	Somos	—N/a		Balassagyarmat	
Pest	—N/a	Csömör; Százhalombatta; Újhartyán	—N/a		Budakalász; Diósd	Perbál	—N/a		
Somogy	Balatonlelle	—N/a			Tab	—N/a		Kadarkút	
Szabolcs-Szatmár-Bereg	Sényő	Kemecse-Filó; Nagydobos; Szakoly	—N/a	Mátészalka	Gyulaháza; Tiszavasvári	Nagykálló	—N/a		
Tolna	TBA								
Vas	—N/a	Kőszeg	—N/a	Király	Csákánydoroszló	—N/a		ISA Haladás	
Veszprém	Balatonfüredi FC	Badacsonytomaj	—N/a	Balatonalmádi	—N/a				
Zala	—N/a	Letenye	—N/a	Zalaegerszeg II	Teskánd	—N/a			

== Tables ==
=== Bács-Kiskun ===
Pos	Team	Pld	W	D	L	GF	GA	GD	Pts	Promotion or relegation
1	Baja	0	0	0	0	0	0	0	0	Qualification for promotion play-offs
2	Csólyospálos	0	0	0	0	0	0	0	0	
3	Harta	0	0	0	0	0	0	0	0	
4	Jánoshalma	0	0	0	0	0	0	0	0	
5	Kalocsa	0	0	0	0	0	0	0	0	
6	Kecel	0	0	0	0	0	0	0	0	
7	Kecskeméti LC	0	0	0	0	0	0	0	0	
8	Kecskeméti TE II	0	0	0	0	0	0	0	0	
9	Kiskőrös	0	0	0	0	0	0	0	0	
10	Kiskunfélegyháza	0	0	0	0	0	0	0	0	
11	Kunbaja	0	0	0	0	0	0	0	0	
12	Lajosmizse	0	0	0	0	0	0	0	0	
13	Soltvadkert	0	0	0	0	0	0	0	0	
14	Tiszakécske II	0	0	0	0	0	0	0	0	Relegation to Megyei Bajnokság II

First match(es) will be played: 22 August 2026. Source: Hungarian Football Federation

=== Baranya ===
Pos	Team	Pld	W	D	L	GF	GA	GD	Pts	Promotion or relegation
1	Bóly	0	0	0	0	0	0	0	0	Qualification for promotion play-offs
2	Harkány	0	0	0	0	0	0	0	0	
3	Komló	0	0	0	0	0	0	0	0	
4	Mohács	0	0	0	0	0	0	0	0	
5	Nagykozár	0	0	0	0	0	0	0	0	
6	Pécsi EAC II	0	0	0	0	0	0	0	0	
7	Pécsi VSK	0	0	0	0	0	0	0	0	
8	Sellye	0	0	0	0	0	0	0	0	
9	Siklós	0	0	0	0	0	0	0	0	
10	Villány	0	0	0	0	0	0	0	0	Relegation to Megyei Bajnokság II

First match(es) will be played: 29 August 2026. Source: Hungarian Football Federation

=== Békés ===
Pos	Team	Pld	W	D	L	GF	GA	GD	Pts	Promotion or relegation
1	Békés	0	0	0	0	0	0	0	0	Qualification for promotion play-offs
2	Dévaványa	0	0	0	0	0	0	0	0	
3	Gyomaendrőd	0	0	0	0	0	0	0	0	
4	Jamina	0	0	0	0	0	0	0	0	
5	Kondoros	0	0	0	0	0	0	0	0	
6	Mezőberény	0	0	0	0	0	0	0	0	
7	Nagyszénás	0	0	0	0	0	0	0	0	
8	OMTK-ULE	0	0	0	0	0	0	0	0	
9	Szarvas	0	0	0	0	0	0	0	0	
10	Szeghalom	0	0	0	0	0	0	0	0	
11	Végegyháza	0	0	0	0	0	0	0	0	Relegation to Megyei Bajnokság II

First match(es) will be played: 22 August 2026. Source: Hungarian Football Federation

=== Borsod-Abaúj-Zemplén ===
Pos	Team	Pld	W	D	L	GF	GA	GD	Pts	Promotion or relegation
1	Alsózsolca	0	0	0	0	0	0	0	0	Qualification for promotion play-offs
2	Edelény-Borsodszer	0	0	0	0	0	0	0	0	
3	Emőd	0	0	0	0	0	0	0	0	
4	Felsőzsolca	0	0	0	0	0	0	0	0	
5	Gesztely	0	0	0	0	0	0	0	0	
6	Mezőcsát	0	0	0	0	0	0	0	0	
7	Mezőkeresztes	0	0	0	0	0	0	0	0	
8	Miskolc	0	0	0	0	0	0	0	0	
9	Parasznya	0	0	0	0	0	0	0	0	
10	Putnok	0	0	0	0	0	0	0	0	
11	Sajóbábony	0	0	0	0	0	0	0	0	
12	Sárospatak	0	0	0	0	0	0	0	0	
13	Sátoraljaújhely	0	0	0	0	0	0	0	0	
14	Szerencs	0	0	0	0	0	0	0	0	
15	Szirmabesenyő	0	0	0	0	0	0	0	0	Relegation to Megyei Bajnokság II
16	Tállya	0	0	0	0	0	0	0	0	Relegation to Megyei Bajnokság II

First match(es) will be played: 7 August 2026. Source: Hungarian Football Federation

=== Budapest ===
Pos	Team	Pld	W	D	L	GF	GA	GD	Pts	Promotion or relegation
1	43. Sz. Építők	0	0	0	0	0	0	0	0	Qualification for promotion play-offs
2	Budafok II	0	0	0	0	0	0	0	0	
3	Csepel UFC	0	0	0	0	0	0	0	0	
4	Flotta 2001	0	0	0	0	0	0	0	0	
5	Fővárosi Vízművek	0	0	0	0	0	0	0	0	
6	II. Kerület	0	0	0	0	0	0	0	0	
7	Ikarus	0	0	0	0	0	0	0	0	
8	Issimo	0	0	0	0	0	0	0	0	
9	Kelen	0	0	0	0	0	0	0	0	
10	Mészöly	0	0	0	0	0	0	0	0	
11	Pénzügyőr	0	0	0	0	0	0	0	0	
12	Rákospalota	0	0	0	0	0	0	0	0	
13	Szabadkikötő	0	0	0	0	0	0	0	0	
14	Testnevelési Főiskola	0	0	0	0	0	0	0	0	
15	Testvériség	0	0	0	0	0	0	0	0	Relegation to Megyei Bajnokság II
16	Unione	0	0	0	0	0	0	0	0	Relegation to Megyei Bajnokság II

First match(es) will be played: 15 August 2026. Source: Hungarian Football Federation

=== Csongrád-Csanád ===
Pos	Team	Pld	W	D	L	GF	GA	GD	Pts	Promotion or relegation
1	Algyő	0	0	0	0	0	0	0	0	Qualification for promotion play-offs
2	Balástya	0	0	0	0	0	0	0	0	
3	Bordány	0	0	0	0	0	0	0	0	
4	Deszk	0	0	0	0	0	0	0	0	
5	Dorozsma	0	0	0	0	0	0	0	0	
6	Makó	0	0	0	0	0	0	0	0	
7	Mindszent	0	0	0	0	0	0	0	0	
8	Mórahalom	0	0	0	0	0	0	0	0	
9	Szentes	0	0	0	0	0	0	0	0	
10	SZEOL SC-FK Szeged	0	0	0	0	0	0	0	0	
11	Tiszasziget	0	0	0	0	0	0	0	0	
12	Újszeged	0	0	0	0	0	0	0	0	Relegation to Megyei Bajnokság II

First match(es) will be played: 22 August 2026. Source: Hungarian Football Federation

=== Fejér ===
Pos	Team	Pld	W	D	L	GF	GA	GD	Pts	Promotion or relegation
1	Csór	0	0	0	0	0	0	0	0	Qualification for promotion play-offs
2	Ercsi	0	0	0	0	0	0	0	0	
3	Főnix	0	0	0	0	0	0	0	0	
4	Gárdony	0	0	0	0	0	0	0	0	
5	Ikarus-Maroshegy	0	0	0	0	0	0	0	0	
6	Iváncsa II-Adony	0	0	0	0	0	0	0	0	
7	Kápolnásnyék	0	0	0	0	0	0	0	0	
8	Lajoskomárom	0	0	0	0	0	0	0	0	
9	Martonvásár	0	0	0	0	0	0	0	0	
10	Mezőfalva	0	0	0	0	0	0	0	0	
11	Mór	0	0	0	0	0	0	0	0	
12	Sárosd	0	0	0	0	0	0	0	0	Relegation to Megyei Bajnokság II

First match(es) will be played: 22 August 2026. Source: Hungarian Football Federation

=== Győr-Moson-Sopron ===
Pos	Team	Pld	W	D	L	GF	GA	GD	Pts	Promotion or relegation
1	Abda	0	0	0	0	0	0	0	0	Qualification for promotion play-offs
2	Bácsa	0	0	0	0	0	0	0	0	
3	Csorna	0	0	0	0	0	0	0	0	
4	DAC-UP	0	0	0	0	0	0	0	0	
5	Gönyű	0	0	0	0	0	0	0	0	
6	Gyirmót II	0	0	0	0	0	0	0	0	
7	Győrújbarát	0	0	0	0	0	0	0	0	
8	Győrújfalu	0	0	0	0	0	0	0	0	
9	Kapuvár	0	0	0	0	0	0	0	0	
10	Koroncó	0	0	0	0	0	0	0	0	
11	Lébény	0	0	0	0	0	0	0	0	
12	Mezőörs	0	0	0	0	0	0	0	0	
13	Mosonmagyaróvár II	0	0	0	0	0	0	0	0	
14	Vitnyéd	0	0	0	0	0	0	0	0	Relegation to Megyei Bajnokság II

Source: Hungarian Football Federation

=== Hajdú-Bihar ===
Pos	Team	Pld	W	D	L	GF	GA	GD	Pts	Promotion or relegation
1	Aqua-General HSE (Hajdúszoboszló)	13	12	0	1	58	9	+49	36	Qualification for promotion play-offs
2	Monostorpályi	13	12	0	1	57	8	+49	36	
3	Hajdúsámson	14	9	3	2	43	24	+19	30	
4	Téglás	14	8	4	2	34	16	+18	28	
5	Balmazújváros	14	8	3	3	37	21	+16	27	
6	DEAC II	14	7	3	4	31	19	+12	24	
7	Hajdúböszörmény	14	6	4	4	20	33	−13	22	
8	Sárréti DSK (Sárrétudvari)	14	6	2	6	23	25	−2	20	
9	Józsa	14	6	2	6	19	25	−6	20	
10	BUSE (Berettyóújfalu)	14	5	2	7	24	27	−3	17	
11	Bestrong (Debrecen)	14	5	1	8	27	33	−6	16	
12	Püspökladány	14	2	4	8	14	29	−15	10	
13	Ebes	14	2	2	10	22	37	−15	8	
14	Hajdúdorog	14	2	1	11	19	51	−32	7	
15	Bocskai (Vámospércs)	14	1	3	10	12	49	−37	6	Relegation to Megyei Bajnokság II
16	Létavértes (Note: 1 penalty point deducted from Létavértes)	12	1	2	9	16	50	−34	4	Relegation to Megyei Bajnokság II

Updated to match(es) played on 21 November 2026. Source: Hungarian Football Federation

==== Top 3 goal scorer ====
Rank	Player	Team	Goals
1	(Hungary) Lajos Tóth	Aqua-General HSE (Hajdúszoboszló)	20
2	(Hungary) Bogát Bárány	Monostorpályi	19
3	(Hungary) Raul Csörgő	Balmazújváros	13

=== Heves ===
Pos	Team	Pld	W	D	L	GF	GA	GD	Pts	Promotion or relegation
1	Bélkő	0	0	0	0	0	0	0	0	Qualification for promotion play-offs
2	Besenyőtelek	0	0	0	0	0	0	0	0	
3	Eger II	0	0	0	0	0	0	0	0	
4	Egerszalók	0	0	0	0	0	0	0	0	
5	Energia	0	0	0	0	0	0	0	0	
6	Gyöngyös	0	0	0	0	0	0	0	0	
7	Gyöngyöshalász	0	0	0	0	0	0	0	0	
8	Hatvan	0	0	0	0	0	0	0	0	
9	Heréd	0	0	0	0	0	0	0	0	
10	Lőrinci	0	0	0	0	0	0	0	0	
11	Maklár	0	0	0	0	0	0	0	0	
12	Marshall-Andornaktálya	0	0	0	0	0	0	0	0	Relegation to Megyei Bajnokság II

First match(es) will be played: 15 August 2026. Source: Hungarian Football Federation

=== Jász-Nagykun-Szolnok ===
Pos	Team	Pld	W	D	L	GF	GA	GD	Pts	Promotion or relegation
1	Abádszalók	0	0	0	0	0	0	0	0	Qualification for promotion play-offs
2	Cserkeszőlő	0	0	0	0	0	0	0	0	
3	Fegyvernek	0	0	0	0	0	0	0	0	
4	Jászárokszállás	0	0	0	0	0	0	0	0	
5	Jászberény	0	0	0	0	0	0	0	0	
6	Jászfényszaru	0	0	0	0	0	0	0	0	
7	Kisújszállás	0	0	0	0	0	0	0	0	
8	Lurkó Focimánia	0	0	0	0	0	0	0	0	
9	Mezőtúr	0	0	0	0	0	0	0	0	
10	Rákóczifalva	0	0	0	0	0	0	0	0	
11	Szajol	0	0	0	0	0	0	0	0	
12	Tiszaföldvár	0	0	0	0	0	0	0	0	
13	Tiszaszentimre	0	0	0	0	0	0	0	0	
14	Törökszentmiklós	0	0	0	0	0	0	0	0	
15	Tószeg	0	0	0	0	0	0	0	0	Relegation to Megyei Bajnokság II
16	Zagyvarékas	0	0	0	0	0	0	0	0	Relegation to Megyei Bajnokság II

First match(es) will be played: 22 August 2026. Source: Hungarian Football Federation

=== Komárom-Esztergom ===
==== Regular stage ====
Pos	Team	Pld	W	D	L	GF	GA	GD	Pts	Qualification
1	Bábolna	0	0	0	0	0	0	0	0	Qualification for promotion group
2	Dorog II	0	0	0	0	0	0	0	0	Qualification for promotion group
3	Kecskéd	0	0	0	0	0	0	0	0	Qualification for promotion group
4	Koppánymonostor	0	0	0	0	0	0	0	0	Qualification for promotion group
5	Környe	0	0	0	0	0	0	0	0	Qualification for promotion group
6	Nyergesújfalu	0	0	0	0	0	0	0	0	Qualification for promotion group
7	Sárisáp II	0	0	0	0	0	0	0	0	Qualification for relegation group
8	Tát	0	0	0	0	0	0	0	0	Qualification for relegation group
9	Tata	0	0	0	0	0	0	0	0	Qualification for relegation group
10	Vértessomló	0	0	0	0	0	0	0	0	Qualification for relegation group
11	Zsámbék	0	0	0	0	0	0	0	0	Qualification for relegation group

First match(es) will be played: 15 August 2026. Source: Hungarian Football Federation

=== Nógrád ===
Pos	Team	Pld	W	D	L	GF	GA	GD	Pts	Promotion or relegation
1	Berkenye	0	0	0	0	0	0	0	0	Qualification for promotion play-offs
2	Diósjenő	0	0	0	0	0	0	0	0	
3	Héhalom	0	0	0	0	0	0	0	0	
4	Karancsberény-Újbuda	0	0	0	0	0	0	0	0	
5	Karancslapujtő	0	0	0	0	0	0	0	0	
6	Mohora	0	0	0	0	0	0	0	0	
7	Nagybátony	0	0	0	0	0	0	0	0	
8	Pásztó	0	0	0	0	0	0	0	0	
9	Romhány	0	0	0	0	0	0	0	0	
10	Szécsény	0	0	0	0	0	0	0	0	
11	Szügy-Talent	0	0	0	0	0	0	0	0	
12	Vizslás	0	0	0	0	0	0	0	0	Relegation to Megyei Bajnokság II

First match(es) will be played: 15 August 2026. Source: Hungarian Football Federation

=== Pest ===
Pos	Team	Pld	W	D	L	GF	GA	GD	Pts	Promotion or relegation
1	Aranyszarvas	0	0	0	0	0	0	0	0	Qualification for promotion play-offs
2	Biatorbágy	0	0	0	0	0	0	0	0	
3	Bugyi	0	0	0	0	0	0	0	0	
4	Cegléd	0	0	0	0	0	0	0	0	
5	Csömör	0	0	0	0	0	0	0	0	
6	Dunakeszi	0	0	0	0	0	0	0	0	
7	Dunavarsány	0	0	0	0	0	0	0	0	
8	Felsőpakony	0	0	0	0	0	0	0	0	
9	Pilis	0	0	0	0	0	0	0	0	
10	Pomáz	0	0	0	0	0	0	0	0	
11	Százhalombatta	0	0	0	0	0	0	0	0	
12	Szentendre	0	0	0	0	0	0	0	0	
13	Újhartyán	0	0	0	0	0	0	0	0	
14	Vác	0	0	0	0	0	0	0	0	
15	Vecsés	0	0	0	0	0	0	0	0	Relegation to Megyei Bajnokság II
16	Veresegyház Cso-Ki	0	0	0	0	0	0	0	0	Relegation to Megyei Bajnokság II

First match(es) will be played: 22 August 2026. Source: Hungarian Football Federation

=== Somogy ===
Pos	Team	Pld	W	D	L	GF	GA	GD	Pts	Promotion or relegation
1	Balatoni Vasas	0	0	0	0	0	0	0	0	Qualification for promotion play-offs
2	Balatonlelle	0	0	0	0	0	0	0	0	
3	Barcs	0	0	0	0	0	0	0	0	
4	Csurgó	0	0	0	0	0	0	0	0	
5	Juta	0	0	0	0	0	0	0	0	
6	Kaposfüred	0	0	0	0	0	0	0	0	
7	Kaposmérő	0	0	0	0	0	0	0	0	
8	Marcali	0	0	0	0	0	0	0	0	
9	Nagyatád	0	0	0	0	0	0	0	0	
10	Nagybajom	0	0	0	0	0	0	0	0	
11	Somogysárd	0	0	0	0	0	0	0	0	
12	Toponár	0	0	0	0	0	0	0	0	Relegation to Megyei Bajnokság II

First match(es) will be played: 22 August 2026. Source: Hungarian Football Federation

=== Szabolcs-Szatmár-Bereg ===
Pos	Team	Pld	W	D	L	GF	GA	GD	Pts	Promotion or relegation
1	Baktalórántháza	0	0	0	0	0	0	0	0	Qualification for promotion play-offs
2	Csenger	0	0	0	0	0	0	0	0	
3	Gergelyiugornya	0	0	0	0	0	0	0	0	
4	Ibrány	0	0	0	0	0	0	0	0	
5	Kemecse-Filó	0	0	0	0	0	0	0	0	
6	Kótaj	0	0	0	0	0	0	0	0	
7	Mándok	0	0	0	0	0	0	0	0	
8	Nagydobos	0	0	0	0	0	0	0	0	
9	Nagyecsed	0	0	0	0	0	0	0	0	
10	Nyírbátor	0	0	0	0	0	0	0	0	
11	Nyírmeggyes	0	0	0	0	0	0	0	0	
12	Sényő	0	0	0	0	0	0	0	0	
13	Szakoly	0	0	0	0	0	0	0	0	
14	Újdombrád	0	0	0	0	0	0	0	0	
15	Újfehértó	0	0	0	0	0	0	0	0	Relegation to Megyei Bajnokság II
16	Vásárosnamény	0	0	0	0	0	0	0	0	Relegation to Megyei Bajnokság II

First match(es) will be played: 9 August 2026. Source: Hungarian Football Federation

=== Tolna ===
The main league has not yet started because several teams withdrew from the planned competition, leaving too few participants for a standalone league, and the 2026–27 season therefore began with a ten-team qualification championship.

=== Vas ===
Pos	Team	Pld	W	D	L	GF	GA	GD	Pts	Promotion or relegation
1	Celldömölk	0	0	0	0	0	0	0	0	Qualification for promotion play-offs
2	Csepreg	0	0	0	0	0	0	0	0	
3	Körmend	0	0	0	0	0	0	0	0	
4	Kőszeg	0	0	0	0	0	0	0	0	
5	Lukácsháza	0	0	0	0	0	0	0	0	
6	Sárvár	0	0	0	0	0	0	0	0	
7	Söpte	0	0	0	0	0	0	0	0	
8	Szarvaskend	0	0	0	0	0	0	0	0	
9	Szentgotthárd	0	0	0	0	0	0	0	0	
10	Vép	0	0	0	0	0	0	0	0	Relegation to Megyei Bajnokság II

First match(es) will be played: 15 August 2026. Source: Hungarian Football Federation

=== Veszprém ===
Pos	Team	Pld	W	D	L	GF	GA	GD	Pts	Promotion or relegation
1	Badacsonytomaj	0	0	0	0	0	0	0	0	Qualification for promotion play-offs
2	Balatonfüredi FC	0	0	0	0	0	0	0	0	
3	Balatonfüredi USC	0	0	0	0	0	0	0	0	
4	Csetény	0	0	0	0	0	0	0	0	
5	Devecser	0	0	0	0	0	0	0	0	
6	Pét	0	0	0	0	0	0	0	0	
7	Sümeg	0	0	0	0	0	0	0	0	
8	Szentantalfa	0	0	0	0	0	0	0	0	
9	Tapolca	0	0	0	0	0	0	0	0	
10	Tihany	0	0	0	0	0	0	0	0	
11	Ugod	0	0	0	0	0	0	0	0	
12	Úrkút	0	0	0	0	0	0	0	0	
13	Várpalota	0	0	0	0	0	0	0	0	
14	Zirc	0	0	0	0	0	0	0	0	Relegation to Megyei Bajnokság II

First match(es) will be played: 15 August 2026. Source: Hungarian Football Federation

=== Zala ===
Pos	Team	Pld	W	D	L	GF	GA	GD	Pts	Promotion or relegation
1	Andráshida SC	0	0	0	0	0	0	0	0	Qualification for promotion play-offs
2	Andráshida TE	0	0	0	0	0	0	0	0	
3	Becsehely	0	0	0	0	0	0	0	0	
4	Csesztreg	0	0	0	0	0	0	0	0	
5	Hévíz	0	0	0	0	0	0	0	0	
6	Kiskanizsa	0	0	0	0	0	0	0	0	
7	Lenti	0	0	0	0	0	0	0	0	
8	Letenye	0	0	0	0	0	0	0	0	
9	Semjénháza	0	0	0	0	0	0	0	0	
10	Szepetnek	0	0	0	0	0	0	0	0	
11	Zalakomár-Zalakaros	0	0	0	0	0	0	0	0	
12	Zalalövő	0	0	0	0	0	0	0	0	
13	Zalaszentgrót	0	0	0	0	0	0	0	0	Relegation to Megyei Bajnokság II

First match(es) will be played: 22 August 2026. Source: Hungarian Football Federation

== See also ==
- 2026–27 Magyar Kupa
- 2026–27 Nemzeti Bajnokság III
- 2026–27 Nemzeti Bajnokság II
- 2026–27 Nemzeti Bajnokság I
