= 2019–20 Megyei Bajnokság I =

Megyei Bajnokság I
- Season: 2019–20

The 2019–20 Megyei Bajnokság I includes the championships of 20 counties in Hungary (including Budapest). It is the fourth tier of the Hungarian football league system.

On 16 March 2020, the Hungarian Football Federation suspended all competitions and training events it organized with immediate effect, in line with the decisions of the authorities, and also recommended the suspension of all in-person sporting activities, including training sessions, until further notice,as a result of the situation caused by the COVID-19 pandemic in Hungary. The federation later decided that the suspended county-level Division I championships would not resume, with the remaining fixtures cancelled. The standings were frozen in their current state, but the competitions were closed without official final results, meaning there were no champions, no final placings, and no promotion or relegation based on the final standings, although the teams leading their respective leagues were eligible to apply for participation in the 2020–21 Nemzeti Bajnokság III season.

== Teams ==
The following teams have changed division since the 2018–19 season.

County	To Megyei Bajnokság I		From Megyei Bajnokság I					Ref.
County	Relegated from Nemzeti Bajnokság III	Promoted from Megyei Bajnokság II	Promoted to Nemzeti Bajnokság III	Relegated to			Dissolved	Ref.
County	Relegated from Nemzeti Bajnokság III	Promoted from Megyei Bajnokság II	Promoted to Nemzeti Bajnokság III	Megyei Bajnokság II	Megyei Bajnokság III	Megyei Bajnokság IV	Dissolved	Ref.
Bács-Kiskun	—N/a	Kecskeméti LC; Kerekegyháza	—N/a		Kelebia	—N/a		
Baranya	—N/a						Szászvár	
Békés	—N/a			Mezőhegyes; Vésztő	—N/a		Kondoros	
Borsod-Abaúj-Zemplén	Cigánd; Sajóbábony	Gönc; Mezőkeresztes; Miskolc; Nyékládháza	Ózd	Bükkzsérc; Onga; Parasznya	—N/a			
Budapest	Csepel; Pénzügyőr	BVSC-Zugló; Közterület	Kelen	Pestszentimre; RAFC; Újbuda	—N/a			
Csongrád	Hódmezővásárhely; Makó	Mórahalom	—N/a	FK 1899 Szeged; Hódmezővásárhely II; Makó II	—N/a	Szőreg	—N/a	
Fejér	—N/a	Bodajk; Velence	Bicske	Baracs	Mezőfalva; Polgárdi	—N/a		
Győr-Moson-Sopron	—N/a	Abda; Vitnyéd	Lipót	Fertőszentmiklós	—N/a			
Hajdú-Bihar	—N/a	Püspökladány	Debreceni VSC II	—N/a				
Heves	—N/a		Hatvan	Borsodnádasd	—N/a			
Jász-Nagykun-Szolnok	—N/a	Tiszaföldvár	Tiszafüred	Jászkisér	—N/a			
Komárom-Esztergom	—N/a			Ács	—N/a			
Nógrád	Salgótarján	Bátonyterenye; Diósjenő; Karancsberény; Mohora; Szendehely	Balassagyarmat	—N/a				
Pest	—N/a	Cso-Ki Sport; Törökbálint; Veresegyház	Dabas-Gyón	Felsőpakony; Tápiószecső	—N/a			
Somogy	—N/a	Barcs; Somogyjád	Balatonlelle	Balatonföldvár	—N/a		Babócsa	
Szabolcs-Szatmár-Bereg	—N/a	Kemecse; Nyírmeggyes; Újfehértó	—N/a	Csenger; Gyulaháza; Tiszavasvári	—N/a			
Tolna	—N/a			Kölesd	—N/a			
Vas	—N/a	Bük; Szarvaskend	—N/a	Ikervár; Vasszécseny	—N/a			
Veszprém	—N/a	Badacsonytomaj; Pét	Veszprém	—N/a	Zirc	—N/a		
Zala	Andráshida SC	Andráshida TE	Hévíz SK	Becsehely; Keszthely	—N/a			

== Tables ==
=== Bács-Kiskun ===
Pos	Team	Pld	W	D	L	GF	GA	GD	Pts
1	Jánoshalma	17	13	2	2	42	18	+24	41
2	Kalocsa	18	10	3	5	23	19	+4	33
3	Szabadszállás	18	9	6	3	41	20	+21	33
4	Kiskunfélegyháza	18	9	6	3	45	28	+17	33
5	Harta	18	10	2	6	47	41	+6	32
6	Kerekegyháza	18	8	6	4	49	31	+18	30
7	Kiskunhalas	18	5	7	6	38	34	+4	22
8	Tiszakécske II	18	5	6	7	34	33	+1	21
9	Lajosmizse	18	5	6	7	26	38	−12	21
10	Kiskőrös	17	5	5	7	25	27	−2	20
11	Soltvadkert	18	5	5	8	28	33	−5	20
12	Kecel	18	4	5	9	20	43	−23	17
13	Kecskeméti LC	18	4	4	10	23	38	−15	16
14	Akasztó	17	3	5	9	22	43	−21	14
15	Bácsalmás	17	2	4	11	16	33	−17	10

Source: Hungarian Football Federation

=== Baranya ===
Pos	Team	Pld	W	D	L	GF	GA	GD	Pts
1	Pécsvárad	15	15	0	0	48	8	+40	45
2	Komló	15	11	1	3	41	22	+19	34
3	Mohács	15	10	4	1	39	12	+27	34
4	PTE-PEAC	15	10	1	4	47	14	+33	31
5	Pécsi VSK	15	6	5	4	24	19	+5	23
6	Villány	15	7	1	7	34	27	+7	22
7	Boda	15	7	1	7	20	21	−1	22
8	Harkány	15	6	2	7	16	29	−13	20
9	Szederkény	15	5	2	8	22	30	−8	17
10	Siklós	15	4	2	9	16	34	−18	14
11	Szentlőrinc II	15	4	1	10	17	32	−15	13
12	Lovászhetény	15	3	2	10	19	31	−12	11
13	Sellye	15	2	2	11	14	45	−31	8
14	Bóly	15	2	2	11	13	46	−33	8

Source: Hungarian Football Federation

=== Békés ===
Pos	Team	Pld	W	D	L	GF	GA	GD	Pts	Promotion or relegation
1	Körösladány (P)	17	12	3	2	50	16	+34	39	Promotion to Nemzeti Bajnokság III
2	Békéscsaba II	17	10	3	4	65	19	+46	33	
3	Szarvas	17	10	3	4	38	18	+20	33	
4	Szeghalom	17	8	2	7	30	34	−4	26	
5	Gyula	17	7	4	6	24	30	−6	25	
6	Nagyszénás	17	4	3	10	20	48	−28	15	
7	OMTK-ULE	17	3	3	11	26	53	−27	12	
8	Jamina SE	17	2	3	12	14	49	−35	9	

Source: Hungarian Football Federation
(P) Promoted

=== Borsod-Abaúj-Zemplén ===
Pos	Team	Pld	W	D	L	GF	GA	GD	Pts	Promotion or relegation
1	Sajóbábony (P)	19	14	4	1	59	17	+42	46	Promotion to Nemzeti Bajnokság III
2	Cigánd	18	13	4	1	56	14	+42	43	
3	Mezőkövesd II (P)	18	13	1	4	56	33	+23	40	Promotion to Nemzeti Bajnokság III
4	Hidasnémeti	18	10	4	4	50	34	+16	34	
5	Edelény	18	10	2	6	42	35	+7	32	
6	Gesztely	17	10	0	7	38	30	+8	30	
7	Felsőzsolca	19	9	2	8	56	38	+18	29	
8	Miskolc	19	8	4	7	47	42	+5	28	
9	Encs	19	8	1	10	36	45	−9	25	
10	Bőcs	19	7	4	8	37	43	−6	25	
11	Bánhorváti	18	7	3	8	37	32	+5	24	
12	Mád	19	6	3	10	33	42	−9	21	
13	Mezőkeresztes	19	5	3	11	26	41	−15	18	
14	Nyékládháza	19	5	1	13	31	66	−35	16	
15	Bogács (R)	18	2	1	15	24	66	−42	7	Relegation to Megyei Bajnokság II
16	Gönc (R)	19	2	1	16	22	72	−50	7	Relegation to Megyei Bajnokság II

Source: Hungarian Football Federation
(P) Promoted; (R) Relegated

=== Budapest ===
Pos	Team	Pld	W	D	L	GF	GA	GD	Pts	Promotion or relegation
1	BVSC-Zugló (P)	17	14	3	0	61	7	+54	45	Promotion to Nemzeti Bajnokság III
2	Csepel	19	14	3	2	47	18	+29	45	
3	Újpest II (P)	19	13	2	4	53	22	+31	37 (Note: Újpest II were deducted 4 points after fielding an ineligible player in their match against SZAC on 22 February 2020, consisting of the three points earned from the match and an additional one-point penalty.)	Promotion to Nemzeti Bajnokság III
4	SZAC	18	11	3	4	39	19	+20	36	
5	Pénzügyőr	19	11	3	5	43	26	+17	36	
6	Testvériség	19	10	2	7	32	30	+2	32	
7	Rákospalota	18	9	4	5	36	23	+13	31	
8	Fővárosi Vízművek	19	8	6	5	38	27	+11	30	
9	43. Sz. Építők	18	9	2	7	28	25	+3	29	
10	Budafok II	19	7	2	10	28	29	−1	23	
11	Unione	18	5	3	10	26	38	−12	18	
12	Svábhegy	19	5	3	11	20	46	−26	18	
13	Gázgyár	17	3	5	9	21	34	−13	14	
14	Ikarus	19	3	2	14	18	54	−36	11	
15	Csep-Gól	18	2	2	14	11	46	−35	8	
16	Közterület	18	0	1	17	12	69	−57	1	

Source: Hungarian Football Federation
(P) Promoted

=== Csongrád ===
Pos	Team	Pld	W	D	L	GF	GA	GD	Pts	Promotion or relegation
1	Szegedi VSE (P)	14	13	1	0	58	9	+49	40	Promotion to Nemzeti Bajnokság III
2	Hódmezővásárhely (P)	14	12	1	1	51	9	+42	37	Promotion to Nemzeti Bajnokság III
3	Makó	14	11	3	0	50	8	+42	36	
4	Bordány	14	6	3	5	26	20	+6	21	
5	Tiszasziget	13	6	2	5	19	15	+4	20	
6	Mórahalom	13	6	1	6	27	21	+6	19	
7	Algyő	14	6	1	7	23	27	−4	19	
8	Kiskundorozsma	14	5	3	6	26	29	−3	18	
9	Csongrád	14	5	0	9	24	35	−11	15	
10	Újszeged	14	4	2	8	11	38	−27	14	
11	Röszke (R)	14	4	1	9	16	34	−18	13	Relegation to Megyei Bajnokság III
12	Szentes	14	3	0	11	15	48	−33	9	
13	Székkutas	14	0	0	14	10	63	−53	0	
14	Zsombó (Note: Zsombó withdrew from the league. The club returned to league competition the following season by entering the Megyei Bajnokság III.) (D, R)	0	0	0	0	0	0	0	0	Exclution and relegation to Megyei Bajnokság III

Source: Hungarian Football Federation
(D) Disqualified; (P) Promoted; (R) Relegated

=== Fejér ===
Pos	Team	Pld	W	D	L	GF	GA	GD	Pts	Promotion or relegation
1	Gárdony (P)	13	11	1	1	52	15	+37	34	Promotion to Nemzeti Bajnokság III
2	Mór	13	10	1	2	59	13	+46	31	
3	Főnix-Baracska	13	8	1	4	32	21	+11	25	
4	Tordas	13	7	2	4	25	20	+5	23	
5	Sárbogárd	13	5	4	4	25	18	+7	19	
6	Lajoskomárom	13	6	0	7	24	39	−15	18	
7	Martonvásár	13	4	5	4	20	14	+6	17	
8	Ercsi	13	5	1	7	23	36	−13	16	
9	Sárosd	13	3	6	4	22	28	−6	15	
10	Bodajk	13	3	4	6	16	30	−14	13	
11	Ikarus-Maroshegy	12	3	3	6	15	17	−2	12	
12	Kisláng	13	3	2	8	22	47	−25	11	
13	Enying	13	1	0	12	9	46	−37	3	
14	Velence (Note: Velence withdrew from the league.) (D, R)	0	0	0	0	0	0	0	0	Excluded

Source: Hungarian Football Federation
(D) Disqualified; (P) Promoted; (R) Relegated

=== Győr-Moson-Sopron ===
Pos	Team	Pld	W	D	L	GF	GA	GD	Pts	Promotion or relegation
1	SC Sopron (P)	19	14	4	1	69	15	+54	46	Promotion to Nemzeti Bajnokság III
2	Csorna	19	14	4	1	60	13	+47	46	
3	Kapuvár	19	13	2	4	63	31	+32	41	
4	Vitnyéd	19	11	6	2	41	16	+25	39	
5	Jánossomorja	19	11	5	3	33	8	+25	38	
6	Nyúl	19	11	2	6	49	27	+22	35	
7	Üstökös	19	8	3	8	34	33	+1	27	
8	Győrszentiván	19	7	4	8	36	41	−5	25	
9	Gönyű	19	7	2	10	34	35	−1	23	
10	Gyirmót II	19	6	4	9	53	33	+20	22	
11	Öttevény (R)	19	6	4	9	37	51	−14	22	Relegation to Megyei Bajnokság III
12	Abda	19	5	7	7	35	36	−1	22	
13	Pannonhalma	19	6	1	12	25	66	−41	19	
14	Beled (R)	19	5	3	11	37	49	−12	18	Relegation to Megyei Bajnokság III
15	Lébény	19	1	1	17	12	90	−78	4	
16	Soproni FAC	19	1	0	18	9	83	−74	3	

Source: Hungarian Football Federation
(P) Promoted; (R) Relegated

=== Hajdú-Bihar ===
Pos	Team	Pld	W	D	L	GF	GA	GD	Pts	Promotion or relegation
1	Monostorpályi	19	15	3	1	63	27	+36	48	
2	Hajdúszoboszló	18	14	2	2	56	10	+46	44	
3	Berettyóújfalu	19	13	3	3	37	17	+20	42	
4	Hajdúböszörmény	19	10	5	4	55	17	+38	35	
5	Sárrétudvari	19	11	1	7	48	45	+3	34	
6	Kaba	19	9	5	5	37	29	+8	32	
7	Debreceni EAC II	19	10	1	8	36	34	+2	31	
8	Derecske	19	8	2	9	39	37	+2	26	
9	Hajdúnánás	18	8	2	8	44	43	+1	26	
10	Nyíradony	19	6	2	11	41	45	−4	20	
11	Hosszúpályi (R)	19	5	3	11	28	47	−19	18	Relegation to Megyei Bajnokság III
12	Debreceni ASE	19	4	5	10	27	40	−13	17	
13	Vámospércs	19	4	4	11	31	51	−20	16	
14	Hajdúsámson	19	3	5	11	27	57	−30	14	
15	Hajdúhadház	19	3	4	12	25	59	−34	13	
16	Püspökladány	19	3	3	13	17	53	−36	12	

Source: Hungarian Football Federation
(R) Relegated

=== Heves ===
Pos	Team	Pld	W	D	L	GF	GA	GD	Pts
1	Lőrinci	15	12	2	1	42	13	+29	38
2	Egerszalók	15	10	3	2	41	20	+21	33
3	Pétervására	15	9	3	3	31	20	+11	30
4	Marshall-Andornaktálya	15	9	2	4	29	19	+10	29
5	Gyöngyöshalász	14	7	2	5	39	19	+20	23
6	Heves	14	7	2	5	30	23	+7	23
7	Felsőtárkány	13	7	1	5	33	29	+4	22
8	Heréd	15	7	1	7	29	32	−3	22
9	Besenyőtelek	14	5	2	7	20	19	+1	17
10	Energia	14	3	4	7	19	25	−6	13
11	Maklár	15	3	3	9	18	30	−12	12
12	Eger II	14	1	5	8	11	24	−13	8
13	Füzesabony	15	1	5	9	11	38	−27	8
14	Bélkő	14	2	1	11	22	64	−42	7

Source: Hungarian Football Federation

=== Jász-Nagykun-Szolnok ===
Pos	Team	Pld	W	D	L	GF	GA	GD	Pts	Promotion or relegation
1	Tiszafüred (P)	17	15	1	1	79	12	+67	46	Promotion to Nemzeti Bajnokság III
2	Törökszentmiklós	18	14	1	3	67	22	+45	43	
3	Újszász	17	11	3	3	38	17	+21	36	
4	Tószeg	17	11	2	4	36	22	+14	35	
5	Mezőtúri AFC	18	10	5	3	58	24	+34	35	
6	Karcag	17	10	1	6	35	27	+8	31	
7	Szajol	17	8	3	6	27	24	+3	27	
8	Jászárokszállás	17	8	1	8	30	28	+2	25	
9	Kisújszállás	17	7	4	6	43	27	+16	25	
10	Jánoshida	16	6	4	6	28	29	−1	22	
11	Tiszaföldvár	18	6	2	10	33	49	−16	20	
12	Jászfényszaru	18	3	3	12	16	42	−26	12	
13	Fegyvernek	17	3	1	13	7	46	−39	10	
14	Kunhegyes	18	2	1	15	25	57	−32	7	
15	Jászkisér (R)	18	0	0	18	8	104	−96	0	Relegation to Megyei Bajnokság II

Source: Hungarian Football Federation
(P) Promoted; (R) Relegated

=== Komárom-Esztergom ===
Pos	Team	Pld	W	D	L	GF	GA	GD	Pts	Promotion or relegation
1	Tatabánya (P)	19	18	0	1	90	9	+81	54	Promotion to Nemzeti Bajnokság III
2	Koppánymonostor	18	12	1	5	41	21	+20	37	
3	Zsámbék	18	11	2	5	49	16	+33	35	
4	Esztergom	18	10	3	5	47	21	+26	33	
5	Nyergesújfalu	18	10	3	5	53	32	+21	33	
6	Vérteszőlős	19	9	2	8	55	51	+4	29	
7	Oroszlányi Bányász SC	19	8	2	9	37	50	−13	26	
8	Kecskéd	18	7	4	7	46	37	+9	25	
9	Bábolna	19	7	3	9	28	35	−7	24	
10	Sárisáp	19	6	4	9	28	43	−15	22	
11	Tata	19	4	3	12	30	64	−34	15	
12	Vértesomló	18	3	2	13	21	68	−47	11	
13	Nagyigmánd	18	0	1	17	12	90	−78	1	

Source: Hungarian Football Federation
(P) Promoted

=== Nógrád ===
Pos	Team	Pld	W	D	L	GF	GA	GD	Pts	Promotion or relegation
1	Salgótarján (P)	19	16	2	1	101	6	+95	50	Promotion to Nemzeti Bajnokság III
2	Diósjenő	19	14	1	4	48	34	+14	43	
3	Mátraterenye	19	12	4	3	60	25	+35	40	
4	Héhalom	19	12	4	3	55	24	+31	40	
5	Berkenye	19	12	2	5	59	29	+30	38	
6	Palotás	19	11	3	5	41	21	+20	36	
7	Pásztó	18	10	4	4	51	30	+21	34	
8	Mohora	19	10	2	7	29	22	+7	32	
9	Cered (R)	19	7	2	10	59	46	+13	23	Relegation to Megyei Bajnokság III
10	Bátonyterenye (R)	19	6	1	12	23	56	−33	19	Relegation to Megyei Bajnokság II
11	Szécsény	19	5	3	11	29	52	−23	18	
12	Érsekvadkert	19	5	2	12	24	53	−29	17	
13	Rimóc	19	4	1	14	22	66	−44	13	
14	Karancslapujtő	19	4	2	13	28	62	−34	11 (Note: Karancslapujtő were deducted 3 points after their under-16 team failed to fulfil a league fixture for the third time during the season, resulting in a one-time three-point penalty being applied to the club's senior team's league total.)	
15	Karancsberény (R)	18	3	2	13	28	71	−43	11	Relegation to Megyei Bajnokság II
16	Szendehely	19	1	3	15	12	72	−60	6	

Source: Hungarian Football Federation
(P) Promoted; (R) Relegated

=== Pest ===
Pos	Team	Pld	W	D	L	GF	GA	GD	Pts	Promotion or relegation
1	Biatorbágy	18	12	4	2	42	18	+24	40	
2	Dunakeszi VSE	18	11	3	4	46	12	+34	36	
3	Maglódi TC	17	11	3	3	29	13	+16	36	
4	Nagykáta	18	9	5	4	47	30	+17	32	
5	Pilis	18	8	7	3	34	29	+5	31	
6	Vecsés	18	8	4	6	31	22	+9	28	
7	Veresegyház	18	7	7	4	21	16	+5	28	
8	Dunavarsány	18	7	3	8	28	28	0	24	
9	Törökbálint (R)	17	6	2	9	23	28	−5	20	Relegation and not competed in any division next season
10	Gödöllő	17	5	4	8	23	28	−5	19	
11	VSK Tököl	18	5	4	9	22	30	−8	19	
12	Cso-Ki Sport	17	5	4	8	28	37	−9	19	
13	Százhalombatta	18	5	2	11	20	31	−11	17	
14	Törtel	17	3	5	9	20	48	−28	13 (Note: Törtel were deducted 1 point)	
15	Szentendre (R)	17	1	1	15	9	53	−44	4	Relegation to Megyei Bajnokság II
16	Nagykőrös (Note: Nagykőrösi Kinizsi withdrew from the league, and the club was subsequently dissolved.) (D, R)	0	0	0	0	0	0	0	0	Exclution and Dissolution

Source: Hungarian Football Federation
(D) Disqualified; (R) Relegated

=== Somogy ===
Pos	Team	Pld	W	D	L	GF	GA	GD	Pts	Promotion or relegation
1	Kadarkút	18	16	0	2	56	18	+38	48	
2	Nagyatád (P)	18	14	4	0	54	18	+36	46	Promotion to Nemzeti Bajnokság III
3	Hetes	18	14	1	3	55	19	+36	43	
4	Nagybajom	18	11	4	3	50	25	+25	37	
5	Balatoni Vasas	18	9	4	5	34	25	+9	31	
6	Balatonkeresztúr-Balatonmáriafürdő	17	9	3	5	45	33	+12	30	
7	Marcali	18	7	4	7	39	40	−1	25	
8	Tab	18	6	6	6	32	36	−4	24	
9	Somogysárd	18	6	3	9	50	35	+15	21	
10	Magyaregres (R)	18	5	4	9	30	42	−12	19	Relegation and not competed in any division next season
11	Toponár	18	4	3	11	36	52	−16	15	
12	Csurgó	17	2	3	12	29	53	−24	9	
13	Segesd	17	2	3	12	17	60	−43	9	
14	Barcs (R)	18	1	6	11	31	61	−30	9	Relegation to Megyei Bajnokság III
15	Somogyjád	17	1	4	12	21	62	−41	7	

Source: Hungarian Football Federation
(P) Promoted; (R) Relegated

=== Szabolcs-Szatmár-Bereg ===
Pos	Team	Pld	W	D	L	GF	GA	GD	Pts	Promotion or relegation
1	Nagyhalász	19	14	3	2	57	22	+35	45	
2	Nyírgyulaj	19	14	1	4	40	20	+20	43	
3	Mándok	19	12	0	7	44	29	+15	36	
4	Vásárosnamény	19	11	2	6	54	32	+22	35	
5	Kisvárda II (P)	19	11	1	7	50	27	+23	34	Promotion to Nemzeti Bajnokság III
6	Ibrány	19	11	1	7	50	32	+18	34	
7	Tarpa	19	9	2	8	50	36	+14	29	
8	Fehérgyarmat	18	9	1	8	44	43	+1	28	
9	Újfehértó	19	8	3	8	38	37	+1	27	
10	Balkány	19	8	0	11	39	48	−9	24	
11	Nagyecsed	18	5	7	6	29	35	−6	22	
12	Kemecse	18	6	2	10	28	43	−15	20	
13	Baktalórántháza	18	5	2	11	21	40	−19	17	
14	Mátészalka	19	4	3	12	23	45	−22	15	
15	Nyírmeggyes	19	4	3	12	30	64	−34	15	
16	Tiszakanyár (R)	19	2	3	14	29	73	−44	9	Relegation to Megyei Bajnokság II

Source: Hungarian Football Federation
(P) Promoted; (R) Relegated

=== Tolna ===
Pos	Team	Pld	W	D	L	GF	GA	GD	Pts	Promotion or relegation
1	Majos (P)	16	11	3	2	48	15	+33	36	Promotion to Nemzeti Bajnokság III
2	Bonyhád	16	10	6	0	53	17	+36	36	
3	Dombóvár	16	10	2	4	36	25	+11	32	
4	Bátaszék	16	9	3	4	32	21	+11	30	
5	Tamási	16	8	3	5	39	31	+8	27	
6	Tolna (R)	15	5	2	8	31	25	+6	17	Relegation to Megyei Bajnokság II
7	Tevel	16	4	3	9	20	43	−23	15	
8	Kakasd	15	3	3	9	21	40	−19	12	
9	Szedres (R)	16	3	1	12	20	58	−38	10	Relegation to Megyei Bajnokság III
10	Dunaföldvár	16	2	2	12	24	49	−25	8	

Source: Hungarian Football Federation
(P) Promoted; (R) Relegated

=== Vas ===
Pos	Team	Pld	W	D	L	GF	GA	GD	Pts
1	Vép	19	15	1	3	51	18	+33	46
2	Celldömölk	18	14	3	1	52	14	+38	45
3	Rum	19	12	3	4	34	22	+12	39
4	Répcelak	19	11	1	7	46	29	+17	34
5	Szarvaskend	19	9	5	5	57	37	+20	32
6	Rábapaty	18	9	3	6	39	22	+17	30
7	Király	19	9	2	8	31	31	0	29
8	Kőszeg	18	8	3	7	37	35	+2	27
9	Bük	19	8	1	10	34	39	−5	25
10	Körmend	19	7	3	9	35	46	−11	24
11	Egyházasrádóc	19	6	4	9	20	34	−14	22
12	Vasvár	19	5	5	9	32	42	−10	20
13	Lukácsháza	19	4	3	12	24	39	−15	15
14	Szentgotthárd	19	3	6	10	27	43	−16	15
15	Csepreg	19	4	0	15	14	63	−49	12
16	Jánosháza	18	3	3	12	17	36	−19	12

Source: Hungarian Football Federation

=== Veszprém ===
Pos	Team	Pld	W	D	L	GF	GA	GD	Pts	Promotion or relegation
1	Balatonfüred (P)	19	18	0	1	83	7	+76	54	Promotion to Nemzeti Bajnokság III
2	Ajka Kristály	19	16	1	2	84	17	+67	49	
3	Úrkút	19	14	3	2	64	17	+47	45	
4	Tihany	19	13	3	3	59	21	+38	42	
5	Balatonalmádi	19	12	0	7	57	28	+29	36	
6	Fűzfő	19	11	3	5	45	26	+19	36	
7	Badacsonytomaj	19	8	2	9	39	54	−15	25 (Note: Badacsonytomaj were deducted 1 point)	
8	Várpalota	19	7	3	9	37	62	−25	24	
9	Tapolca	19	7	1	11	37	64	−27	22	
10	Pét	19	7	0	12	44	41	+3	21	
11	Csetény	19	6	3	10	35	49	−14	20 (Note: Csetény were deducted 1 point)	
12	Magyarpolány	19	5	3	11	30	54	−24	18	
13	Gyulafirátót	19	5	3	11	29	58	−29	18	
14	Devecser	19	4	1	14	29	65	−36	13	
15	Sümeg	19	3	1	15	25	77	−52	10	
16	Herend	19	1	3	15	17	74	−57	6	

Source: Hungarian Football Federation
(P) Promoted

=== Zala ===
Pos	Team	Pld	W	D	L	GF	GA	GD	Pts	Promotion or relegation
1	Gellénháza (R)	18	12	4	2	53	23	+30	40	Relegation to Megyei Bajnokság III
2	Csácsbozsok-Nemesapáti	18	12	3	3	62	22	+40	39	
3	Gyenesdiás	17	12	2	3	50	15	+35	38	
4	Andráshida SC	18	9	5	4	50	34	+16	32	
5	Andráshida TE	18	9	3	6	43	37	+6	30	
6	Csesztreg	17	8	5	4	54	42	+12	29	
7	Szepetnek	18	8	5	5	32	27	+5	29	
8	Zalaszentgrót	18	8	4	6	44	33	+11	28	
9	Zalalövő	18	8	1	9	35	35	0	25	
10	Teskánd	18	7	2	9	27	29	−2	23	
11	Zalakomár	17	7	1	9	38	40	−2	22	
12	Lenti	18	6	3	9	31	41	−10	21	
13	Semjénháza	16	4	0	12	20	45	−25	12	
14	Kiskanizsa	18	2	0	16	16	71	−55	6	
15	Police-Ola (R)	17	1	0	16	15	76	−61	3	Relegation to Megyei Bajnokság II

Source: Hungarian Football Federation
(R) Relegated

== See also ==
- 2019–20 Magyar Kupa
- 2019–20 Nemzeti Bajnokság III
- 2019–20 Nemzeti Bajnokság II
- 2019–20 Nemzeti Bajnokság I
