= 2021–22 Megyei Bajnokság I =

Megyei Bajnokság I
- Season: 2021–22

The 2021–22 Megyei Bajnokság I includes the championships of 20 counties in Hungary. It is the fourth tier of the Hungarian football league system.

== Bács-Kiskun ==
=== League table ===
Pos	Team	Pld	W	D	L	GF	GA	GD	Pts	Promotion or relegation
1	Kiskunfélegyháza	24	17	6	1	61	22	+39	57	Promotion to Nemzeti Bajnokság III
2	Kiskőrös	24	15	3	6	50	27	+23	48	
3	Jánoshalma (Note: 1 points deducted)	24	12	7	5	41	30	+11	42	
4	Tiszakécske II	24	11	6	7	60	52	+8	39	
5	Akasztó	24	11	4	9	45	43	+2	37	
6	Harta	24	10	7	7	50	36	+14	37	
7	Bácsalmás	24	7	11	6	37	29	+8	32	
8	Lajosmizse	24	8	5	11	41	40	+1	29	
9	Kalocsa	24	8	4	12	44	38	+6	28	
10	Kecskeméti LC	24	6	9	9	33	39	−6	27	
11	Kecel	24	7	4	13	38	63	−25	25	
12	Kiskunhalas (Note: 1 points deducted)	24	3	5	16	19	71	−52	13	Relegation to Megyei Bajnokság II
13	Soltvadkert	24	2	7	15	32	61	−29	13	

Updated to match(es) played on 30 June 2022. Source: MLSZ.HU
Rules for classification: 1) Points; 2) Head-to-head points; 3) Head-to-head goal difference; 4) Head-to-head goals scored; 5) Head-to-head away goals scored; 6) Goal difference; 7) Goals scored.

== Baranya ==
=== League table ===
Pos	Team	Pld	W	D	L	GF	GA	GD	Pts	Promotion or relegation
1	Pécsi EAC	28	22	4	2	117	32	+85	70	Promotion to Nemzeti Bajnokság III
2	Pécsvárad	28	21	5	2	131	25	+106	68	
3	Mozsgó - Szentlőrinc II	28	20	2	6	90	47	+43	62	
4	Bóly	28	17	6	5	68	31	+37	57	
5	Pécsi VSK	28	17	4	7	72	39	+33	55	
6	Pécsi MFC II	28	14	8	6	88	42	+46	50	Defunct
7	Lovászhetény	28	13	4	11	69	48	+21	43	
8	Villány	28	13	4	11	55	49	+6	43	
9	Siklós	28	13	1	14	59	80	−21	40	
10	Sellye	28	11	2	15	58	63	−5	35	
11	Komlói Bányász	28	9	2	17	50	73	−23	29	
12	Szederkény (Note: Deducted 1 points)	28	8	3	17	28	57	−29	26	
13	Boda	28	4	2	22	23	97	−74	14	
14	Kétújfalú	28	3	1	24	23	124	−101	10	
15	Harkány	28	0	2	26	18	142	−124	2	Relegation to Megyei Bajnokság II

Updated to match(es) played on 30 June 2022. Source: MLSZ.HU
Rules for classification: 1) Points; 2) Head-to-head points; 3) Head-to-head goal difference; 4) Head-to-head goals scored; 5) Head-to-head away goals scored; 6) Goal difference; 7) Goals scored.

== Békés ==
=== League table ===
Pos	Team	Pld	W	D	L	GF	GA	GD	Pts	Promotion or relegation
1	Körösladány	22	17	4	1	101	17	+84	55	Promotion to Nemzeti Bajnokság III
2	Gyula	22	14	2	6	64	28	+36	44	
3	Szarvas	22	12	4	6	52	33	+19	40	
4	Orosháza	22	12	3	7	51	36	+15	39	
5	Nagyszénás	22	11	5	6	45	42	+3	38	
6	Okány	22	10	7	5	49	44	+5	37	Relegation to Megyei Bajnokság II
7	Jamina	22	10	6	6	41	33	+8	36	
8	Gyomaendrőd	22	7	4	11	49	55	−6	25	
9	Szeghalom	22	7	2	13	42	66	−24	23	
10	Szabadkígyós	22	3	6	13	26	58	−32	15	Relegation to Megyei Bajnokság II
11	Csabacsűd	22	3	5	14	24	58	−34	14	Relegation to Megyei Bajnokság II
12	Sarkad	22	2	0	20	17	91	−74	6	

Updated to match(es) played on 14 April 2022. Source: MLSZ.HU
Rules for classification: 1) Points; 2) Head-to-head points; 3) Head-to-head goal difference; 4) Head-to-head goals scored; 5) Head-to-head away goals scored; 6) Goal difference; 7) Goals scored.

== Borsod-Abaúj-Zemplén ==
=== League table ===
Pos	Team	Pld	W	D	L	GF	GA	GD	Pts	Promotion or relegation
1	Cigánd	30	20	5	5	81	28	+53	65	Promotion to Nemzeti Bajnokság III
2	Gesztely	30	17	9	4	66	28	+38	60	
3	Felsőzsolca	30	18	4	8	83	43	+40	58	
4	Sajóbábony	30	17	3	10	71	51	+20	54	
5	Mezőkövesd II	30	15	5	10	68	38	+30	50	
6	Encs	30	15	4	11	62	44	+18	49	
7	Miskolc	30	15	2	13	69	70	−1	47	
8	Bánhorváti - Kazincbarcika II	30	13	7	10	50	50	0	46	
9	Bőcs	30	12	7	11	66	60	+6	43	
10	Alsózsolca	30	12	5	13	52	61	−9	41	
11	Mezőkeresztes	30	11	6	13	41	56	−15	39	
12	Edelény	30	9	5	16	44	70	−26	32	Relegation to Megyei Bajnokság II
13	Aszaló	30	10	1	19	50	90	−40	31	Relegation to Megyei Bajnokság II
14	Emőd	30	7	7	16	50	75	−25	28	Relegation to Megyei Bajnokság II
15	Borsodnádasd	30	6	8	16	40	73	−33	26	Relegation to Megyei Bajnokság II
16	Mezőcsát (Note: Deducted 2 points)	30	2	4	24	27	83	−56	8	Relegation to Megyei Bajnokság II

Updated to match(es) played on 30 June 2022. Source: MLSZ.HU
Rules for classification: 1) Points; 2) Head-to-head points; 3) Head-to-head goal difference; 4) Head-to-head goals scored; 5) Head-to-head away goals scored; 6) Goal difference; 7) Goals scored.

== Budapest ==
=== League table ===
Pos	Team	Pld	W	D	L	GF	GA	GD	Pts	Promotion or relegation
1	Pénzügyőr	30	24	4	2	88	17	+71	76	Promotion to Nemzeti Bajnokság III
2	Csepel	30	23	7	0	85	22	+63	76	
3	Unione	30	21	4	5	77	30	+47	67	
4	Rákospalota	30	20	4	6	75	31	+44	64	
5	Budafok II	30	17	6	7	95	43	+52	57	
6	Testvériség	30	13	6	11	52	47	+5	45	
7	Fővárosi Vízművek	30	13	5	12	54	59	−5	44	
8	43. Sz. Építők	30	11	6	13	53	51	+2	39	
9	SZAC Budapest (Note: 1 points deducted)	30	9	8	13	48	51	−3	34	
10	Szabadkikötő	30	9	5	16	51	66	−15	32	
11	Gázgyár	30	6	12	12	31	53	−22	30	
12	Pestszentimre	30	5	11	14	39	67	−28	26	
13	Csep-Gól	30	7	4	19	39	79	−40	25	
14	Ikarus	30	5	10	15	40	66	−26	25	
15	XII. Kerület	30	5	7	18	34	77	−43	22	Relegation to Megyei Bajnokság II
16	Mun	30	1	3	26	16	118	−102	6	Relegation to Megyei Bajnokság II

Updated to match(es) played on 30 June 2022. Source: MLSZ.HU
Rules for classification: 1) Points; 2) Head-to-head points; 3) Head-to-head goal difference; 4) Head-to-head goals scored; 5) Head-to-head away goals scored; 6) Goal difference; 7) Goals scored.

== Csongrád-Csanád ==
=== League table ===
Pos	Team	Pld	W	D	L	GF	GA	GD	Pts	Promotion or relegation
1	Szegedi VSE	26	22	2	2	114	16	+98	68	Promotion to Nemzeti Bajnokság III
2	Szeged-GA II	26	21	3	2	102	15	+87	66	
3	Tiszasziget	26	20	2	4	96	26	+70	62	
4	Kiskundorozsma	26	15	3	8	54	33	+21	48	
5	Szentes	26	14	5	7	66	39	+27	47	
6	Mórahalom	26	11	5	10	52	42	+10	38	
7	Hódmezővásárhely II	26	11	3	12	60	54	+6	36	
8	Algyő	26	10	5	11	63	46	+17	35	
9	Deszk	26	8	4	14	39	47	−8	28	
10	Makó II	26	8	3	15	50	74	−24	27	Relegation to Megyei Bajnokság II
11	Újszeged	26	7	3	16	27	61	−34	24	
12	Bordány	26	6	5	15	39	75	−36	23	Relegation to Megyei Bajnokság II
13	DAFC Szeged	26	6	3	17	31	52	−21	21	Defunct
14	Apátfalva	26	0	0	26	14	227	−213	0	Relegation to Megyei Bajnokság II

Updated to match(es) played on 30 June 2022. Source: MLSZ.HU
Rules for classification: 1) Points; 2) Head-to-head points; 3) Head-to-head goal difference; 4) Head-to-head goals scored; 5) Head-to-head away goals scored; 6) Goal difference; 7) Goals scored.

== Fejér ==
=== League table ===
Pos	Team	Pld	W	D	L	GF	GA	GD	Pts	Promotion or relegation
1	Mór	26	18	3	5	55	23	+32	57	Promotion to Nemzeti Bajnokság III
2	Főnix	26	17	6	3	67	23	+44	57	
3	Sárbogárd	26	17	4	5	55	28	+27	55	
4	Tordas	26	11	9	6	44	34	+10	42	
5	Kápolnásnyék	26	12	3	11	44	38	+6	39	
6	Maroshegy	26	9	10	7	43	45	−2	37	
7	Bodajk	26	11	3	12	39	41	−2	36	
8	Ercsi Kinizsi	26	10	4	12	46	36	+10	34	
9	Mány	26	9	7	10	39	42	−3	34	
10	Martonvásár	26	10	3	13	44	42	+2	33	
11	Sárosd	26	9	4	13	39	43	−4	31	
12	Enying	26	7	6	13	41	57	−16	27	
13	Lajoskomárom	26	5	4	17	30	70	−40	19	
14	Kisláng (Note: Deducted 6 points)	26	3	2	21	21	85	−64	5	Relegation to Megyei Bajnokság II

Updated to match(es) played on 30 June 2022. Source: MLSZ.HU
Rules for classification: 1) Points; 2) Head-to-head points; 3) Head-to-head goal difference; 4) Head-to-head goals scored; 5) Head-to-head away goals scored; 6) Goal difference; 7) Goals scored.

== Győr-Moson-Sopron ==
=== League table ===
Pos	Team	Pld	W	D	L	GF	GA	GD	Pts	Promotion or relegation
1	Csorna	30	26	1	3	108	22	+86	79	Promotion to Nemzeti Bajnokság III
2	Koroncó	30	24	1	5	119	40	+79	73	
3	Kapuvár	30	19	4	7	100	54	+46	61	
4	Lipót (Note: 3 points deducted)	30	20	3	7	95	40	+55	60	
5	Bácsa	30	18	2	10	67	41	+26	56	
6	Vitnyéd	30	17	3	10	72	57	+15	54	
7	Mosonmagyaróvár II	30	15	8	7	61	44	+17	53	
8	Ménfőcsanak	30	17	0	13	72	54	+18	51	
9	Soproni FAC	30	11	5	14	54	82	−28	38	
10	Nyúl	30	9	6	15	55	63	−8	33	Relegation to Megyei Bajnokság III
11	Abda	30	8	5	17	47	70	−23	29	
12	Nádorváros	30	5	9	16	39	68	−29	24	
13	Győrszentiván	30	6	5	19	38	88	−50	23	Relegation to Megyei Bajnokság II
14	Pannonhalma	30	5	4	21	27	103	−76	19	
15	Gönyű	30	5	3	22	34	86	−52	18	
16	Jánossomorja	30	4	3	23	26	102	−76	15	Relegation to Megyei Bajnokság II

Updated to match(es) played on 30 June 2022. Source: MLSZ.HU
Rules for classification: 1) Points; 2) Head-to-head points; 3) Head-to-head goal difference; 4) Head-to-head goals scored; 5) Head-to-head away goals scored; 6) Goal difference; 7) Goals scored.

== Hajdú-Bihar ==
=== League table ===
Pos	Team	Pld	W	D	L	GF	GA	GD	Pts	Promotion or relegation
1	Balmazújváros	30	24	3	3	106	26	+80	75	Promotion to Nemzeti Bajnokság III
2	Monostorpályi	30	18	6	6	81	34	+47	60	
3	Hajdúsámson	30	17	5	8	92	50	+42	56	
4	Debreceni EAC II	30	17	5	8	76	40	+36	56	
5	Kaba	30	16	6	8	77	39	+38	54	
6	Nyíradony (Note: 1 points deducted)	30	16	4	10	45	49	−4	51	
7	Debreceni ASE	30	14	6	10	54	49	+5	48	
8	Hajdúnánás	30	11	10	9	55	48	+7	43	
9	Derecske	30	10	9	11	41	52	−11	39	Relegation to Megyei Bajnokság II
10	Sárrétudvar	30	10	7	13	47	57	−10	37	
11	Berettyóújfalu	30	9	6	15	32	50	−18	33	
12	Püspökladány	30	9	2	19	42	91	−49	29	
13	Debreceni SI	30	8	5	17	58	75	−17	29	
14	Hajdúböszörmény	30	8	4	18	38	71	−33	28	
15	Bocskai	30	6	5	19	51	86	−35	23	Relegation to Megyei Bajnokság II
16	Egyek	28	4	3	21	43	121	−78	15	Relegation to Megyei Bajnokság II

Updated to match(es) played on 30 June 2022. Source: MLSZ.HU
Rules for classification: 1) Points; 2) Head-to-head points; 3) Head-to-head goal difference; 4) Head-to-head goals scored; 5) Head-to-head away goals scored; 6) Goal difference; 7) Goals scored.

== Heves ==
=== League table ===
Pos	Team	Pld	W	D	L	GF	GA	GD	Pts	Promotion or relegation
1	Hatvan	28	25	2	1	108	18	+90	77	Promotion to Nemzeti Bajnokság III
2	Egerszalók	28	20	3	5	64	32	+32	63	
3	Lőrinci	28	18	7	3	57	21	+36	61	
4	Gyöngyöshalász	28	16	4	8	52	26	+26	52	
5	Marshall	28	14	7	7	53	38	+15	49	
6	Heréd	28	15	2	11	80	54	+26	47	
7	Gyöngyös	28	14	4	10	68	35	+33	46	
8	Besenyőtelek	28	14	4	10	65	47	+18	46	
9	Energia	28	14	4	10	51	52	−1	46	
10	Maklár	28	10	3	15	48	52	−4	33	
11	Heves	28	8	2	18	54	70	−16	26	
12	Bélapát	28	7	3	18	40	77	−37	24	
13	Eger II	28	5	3	20	33	105	−72	18	
14	Domoszló	28	2	3	23	20	97	−77	9	Relegation to Megyei Bajnokság II
15	Füzesabony	28	1	3	24	15	84	−69	6	
16	Felsőtárkány (Note: Felsőtárkány SC is excluded.)	0	0	0	0	0	0	0	0	Defunct

Updated to match(es) played on 30 June 2022. Source: MLSZ.HU
Rules for classification: 1) Points; 2) Head-to-head points; 3) Head-to-head goal difference; 4) Head-to-head goals scored; 5) Head-to-head away goals scored; 6) Goal difference; 7) Goals scored.

== Jász-Nagykun-Szolnok ==
=== League table ===
Pos	Team	Pld	W	D	L	GF	GA	GD	Pts	Promotion or relegation
1	Karcag	28	23	3	2	106	18	+88	72	Promotion to Nemzeti Bajnokság III
2	Tiszaföldvár	28	22	4	2	111	33	+78	70	
3	Martfű	28	21	3	4	86	30	+56	66	
4	Tószeg	28	16	5	7	56	38	+18	53	
5	Jászfényszaru	28	16	4	8	66	35	+31	52	
6	Kisújszállás	28	16	2	10	68	49	+19	50	
7	Mezőtúr	28	11	7	10	62	54	+8	40	
8	Jászárokszállás	28	9	4	15	35	53	−18	31	
9	Újszászi	28	9	3	16	39	54	−15	30	Relegation to Megyei Bajnokság III
10	Szajol	28	8	3	17	44	80	−36	27	
11	Rákóczifalva	28	8	3	17	44	81	−37	27	
12	Tiszapüspök	28	8	1	19	50	89	−39	25	Defunct
13	Jánoshida	28	7	3	18	40	86	−46	24	
14	Kunhegyes	28	6	2	20	39	80	−41	20	
15	Kunszentmárton	28	4	5	19	33	99	−66	17	

Updated to match(es) played on 30 June 2022. Source: MLSZ.HU
Rules for classification: 1) Points; 2) Head-to-head points; 3) Head-to-head goal difference; 4) Head-to-head goals scored; 5) Head-to-head away goals scored; 6) Goal difference; 7) Goals scored.

== Komárom-Esztergom ==
=== League table ===
Pos	Team	Pld	W	D	L	GF	GA	GD	Pts	Promotion or relegation
1	Zsámbék	29	27	1	1	107	9	+98	82	Promotion to Nemzeti Bajnokság III
2	Koppánymonostor	29	19	3	7	107	32	+75	60	
3	Nyergesújfalu	29	15	2	12	93	78	+15	47	
4	Sárisáp	29	14	4	11	66	44	+22	46	
5	Tata	29	14	2	13	90	78	+12	44	
6	Kecskéd	29	14	2	13	64	57	+7	44	
7	Tát	30	16	3	11	77	54	+23	51	
8	Bábolna	30	13	5	12	73	54	+19	44	
9	Vértesszőlős	30	11	4	15	39	66	−27	37	
10	Környe	30	11	3	16	45	61	−16	36	
11	Esztergom	30	10	4	16	38	65	−27	34	
12	Vértessomló	30	9	4	17	72	96	−24	31	
13	Nagyigmánd	30	0	1	29	19	205	−186	1	Relegation to Megyei Bajnokság II

Updated to match(es) played on 30 June 2022. Source: MLSZ.HU
Rules for classification: 1) Points; 2) Head-to-head points; 3) Head-to-head goal difference; 4) Head-to-head goals scored; 5) Head-to-head away goals scored; 6) Goal difference; 7) Goals scored.

== Nógrád ==
=== League table ===
Pos	Team	Pld	W	D	L	GF	GA	GD	Pts	Promotion or relegation
1	Bánk-Dalnoki Akadémia	26	24	1	1	109	18	+91	73	Promotion to Nemzeti Bajnokság III
2	Mohora	26	17	3	6	83	35	+48	54	
3	Mátraterenye	26	17	1	8	79	45	+34	52	
4	Karancslapujtő	26	15	3	8	80	44	+36	48	
5	Palotás	26	14	6	6	55	25	+30	48	
6	Pásztó	26	14	4	8	67	45	+22	46	
7	Nőtincs	26	12	4	10	68	44	+24	40	Relegation to Megyei Bajnokság III
8	Berkenye	26	11	7	8	65	48	+17	40	
9	Diósjenő (Note: 1 points deducted)	26	8	6	12	48	75	−27	29	
10	Forgách	26	8	3	15	56	64	−8	27	
11	Érsekvadkert	26	7	6	13	62	75	−13	27	
12	Szécsény	26	5	4	17	24	75	−51	19	
13	Szendehely (Note: 3 points deducted)	26	4	3	19	39	102	−63	12	
14	Héhalom	26	0	1	25	14	154	−140	1	
15	Rimóc (Note: Rimóci SE is excluded.)	0	0	0	0	0	0	0	0	Relegation to Megyei Bajnokság III

Updated to match(es) played on 30 June 2022. Source: MLSZ.HU
Rules for classification: 1) Points; 2) Head-to-head points; 3) Head-to-head goal difference; 4) Head-to-head goals scored; 5) Head-to-head away goals scored; 6) Goal difference; 7) Goals scored.

== Pest ==
=== League table ===
Pos	Team	Pld	W	D	L	GF	GA	GD	Pts	Promotion or relegation
1	Gödöllő	30	24	2	4	88	23	+65	74	Promotion to Nemzeti Bajnokság III
2	Dunaharaszti	30	21	8	1	73	15	+58	71	
3	Vecsés	30	18	3	9	79	44	+35	57	
4	Biatorbágy	30	16	7	7	63	43	+20	55	
5	Dunavarsány	30	15	7	8	62	48	+14	52	
6	Veresegyház	30	12	3	15	48	56	−8	39	
7	Nagykáta	30	11	6	13	52	64	−12	39	
8	Pilis	30	10	9	11	39	48	−9	39	
9	Pereg	30	9	9	12	45	56	−11	36	
10	Tököl	30	10	5	15	51	70	−19	35	
11	Gyömrő	30	10	4	16	52	66	−14	34	
12	Taksony	30	10	4	16	51	72	−21	34	Relegation to Megyei Bajnokság IV
13	Felsőpakony	30	9	5	16	49	61	−12	32	
14	Budakalász	30	7	8	15	37	54	−17	29	
15	Maglód	30	6	11	13	40	65	−25	29	Relegation to Megyei Bajnokság II
16	CSO-KI Sport	30	5	3	22	27	71	−44	18	Relegation to Megyei Bajnokság II

Updated to match(es) played on 30 June 2022. Source: MLSZ.HU
Rules for classification: 1) Points; 2) Head-to-head points; 3) Head-to-head goal difference; 4) Head-to-head goals scored; 5) Head-to-head away goals scored; 6) Goal difference; 7) Goals scored.

== Somogy ==
=== League table ===
Pos	Team	Pld	W	D	L	GF	GA	GD	Pts	Promotion or relegation
1	Balatonlelle	24	18	4	2	80	18	+62	58	Promotion to Nemzeti Bajnokság III
2	Nagyatád (Note: 1 points deducted)	24	17	5	2	92	20	+72	55	
3	Nagybajom	24	14	4	6	53	29	+24	46	
4	Kadarkút	24	14	4	6	56	44	+12	46	
5	Balatoni Vasas	24	13	2	9	38	33	+5	41	
6	Juta	24	11	3	10	34	40	−6	36	
7	Somogysárd	24	11	2	11	56	57	−1	35	
8	Marcali	24	10	3	11	41	42	−1	33	
9	Csurgó	24	9	4	11	37	40	−3	31	
10	Balatonkeresztúr	24	9	2	13	44	47	−3	29	
11	Tab	24	4	2	18	22	68	−46	14	
12	Segesd	24	4	2	18	21	73	−52	14	
13	Toponár	24	2	3	19	18	81	−63	9	

Updated to match(es) played on 30 June 2022. Source: MLSZ.HU
Rules for classification: 1) Points; 2) Head-to-head points; 3) Head-to-head goal difference; 4) Head-to-head goals scored; 5) Head-to-head away goals scored; 6) Goal difference; 7) Goals scored.

== Szabolcs-Szatmár-Bereg ==
=== League table ===
Pos	Team	Pld	W	D	L	GF	GA	GD	Pts	Promotion or relegation
1	Nyíregyháza II	30	20	6	4	79	38	+41	66	Promotion to Nemzeti Bajnokság III
2	Ibrány	30	15	6	9	63	42	+21	51	
3	Vásárosnamény	30	15	6	9	55	43	+12	51	
4	Nagyecsed	30	13	11	6	55	35	+20	50	
5	Csenger	30	13	8	9	75	58	+17	47	
6	Mátészalka	30	12	8	10	59	45	+14	44	
7	Balkány	30	12	8	10	59	51	+8	44	
8	Újfehértó	30	11	11	8	53	39	+14	44	
9	Mándok	30	12	6	12	63	54	+9	42	
10	Nyírbátor	30	11	9	10	45	55	−10	42	
11	Tarpa	30	12	4	14	44	46	−2	40	
12	Kemecse	30	10	6	14	47	56	−9	36	
13	Nyírgyulaj	30	10	5	15	43	58	−15	35	Relegation to Megyei Bajnokság III
14	Nyírmeggyes	30	9	1	20	30	65	−35	28	
15	Nagyhalászi	30	8	3	19	36	76	−40	27	
16	Gyulaháza	30	5	6	19	34	79	−45	21	Relegation to Megyei Bajnokság II

Updated to match(es) played on 30 June 2022. Source: MLSZ.HU
Rules for classification: 1) Points; 2) Head-to-head points; 3) Head-to-head goal difference; 4) Head-to-head goals scored; 5) Head-to-head away goals scored; 6) Goal difference; 7) Goals scored.

== Tolna ==
=== League table ===
Pos	Team	Pld	W	D	L	GF	GA	GD	Pts	Promotion or relegation
1	Majos	27	21	3	3	87	21	+66	66	Promotion to Nemzeti Bajnokság III
2	Bonyhád	27	20	3	4	87	29	+58	63	
3	Kakasd	27	15	2	10	66	54	+12	47	
4	Bölcske	27	13	6	8	59	37	+22	45	
5	Bátaszék	27	13	3	11	61	50	+11	42	
6	Dombóvár	27	11	6	10	51	48	+3	39	
7	Tamási	27	9	3	15	36	57	−21	30	
8	Dunaföldvár	27	8	6	13	41	61	−20	30	
9	Tevel	27	5	5	17	37	83	−46	20	
10	Szekszárd II	27	1	1	25	25	110	−85	4	

Updated to match(es) played on 30 June 2022. Source: MLSZ.HU
Rules for classification: 1) Points; 2) Head-to-head points; 3) Head-to-head goal difference; 4) Head-to-head goals scored; 5) Head-to-head away goals scored; 6) Goal difference; 7) Goals scored.

== Vas ==
=== League table ===
Pos	Team	Pld	W	D	L	GF	GA	GD	Pts	Promotion or relegation
1	Celldömölk	15	11	2	2	43	16	+27	35	Promotion to Nemzeti Bajnokság III
2	Király	15	10	4	1	51	18	+33	34	
3	Sárvár	15	10	3	2	56	20	+36	33	
4	Vép	15	10	2	3	41	17	+24	32	
5	Szombathelyi Haladás II	15	8	1	6	38	17	+21	25	
6	Táplán	15	8	1	6	29	47	−18	25	
7	Bük	15	6	4	5	18	17	+1	22	
8	Répcelak	15	6	4	5	24	24	0	22	
9	Rábapatyi	15	5	3	7	23	28	−5	18	
10	Lukácsháza	15	4	3	8	28	44	−16	15	
11	Jánosháza	15	4	2	9	20	37	−17	14	
12	Kőszeg	15	3	5	7	21	25	−4	14	
13	Vasvár	15	3	4	8	22	45	−23	13	
14	Szentgotthárd	15	3	2	10	19	43	−24	11	
15	Körmend	15	2	5	8	22	35	−13	11	
16	Egyházasrádóc	15	2	5	8	10	32	−22	11	Relegation to Megyei Bajnokság II

Updated to match(es) played on 28 November 2021. Source: MLSZ.HU
Rules for classification: 1) Points; 2) Head-to-head points; 3) Head-to-head goal difference; 4) Head-to-head goals scored; 5) Head-to-head away goals scored; 6) Goal difference; 7) Goals scored.

== Veszprém ==
=== League table ===
Pos	Team	Pld	W	D	L	GF	GA	GD	Pts	Promotion or relegation
1	Úrkút	15	13	2	0	62	3	+59	41	Promotion to Nemzeti Bajnokság III
2	Tihany	14	13	1	0	66	13	+53	40	
3	Pét	15	10	1	4	41	21	+20	31	
4	Zirc	15	10	0	5	41	28	+13	30	
5	Sümeg	15	9	1	5	37	30	+7	28	
6	Tapolca	11	8	2	1	49	10	+39	26	
7	Fűzfő	15	8	1	6	45	26	+19	25	
8	Ajka SE	14	6	1	7	40	22	+18	19	
9	Várpalota	15	6	1	8	38	39	−1	19	
10	Szentantalfa	15	5	4	6	43	33	+10	19	
11	Balatonalmádi	13	6	0	7	39	21	+18	18	
12	Magyarpolány	14	5	0	9	35	59	−24	15	
13	Devecser	15	4	2	9	31	49	−18	14	
14	Csetény	14	2	0	12	18	72	−54	6	
15	Gyulafirátót	15	1	0	14	13	92	−79	3	
16	Herend	15	1	0	14	9	89	−80	3	Relegation to Megyei Bajnokság II

Updated to match(es) played on 28 November 2021. Source: MLSZ.HU
Rules for classification: 1) Points; 2) Head-to-head points; 3) Head-to-head goal difference; 4) Head-to-head goals scored; 5) Head-to-head away goals scored; 6) Goal difference; 7) Goals scored.

== Zala ==
=== League table ===
Pos	Team	Pld	W	D	L	GF	GA	GD	Pts	Promotion or relegation
1	Teskánd	12	12	0	0	68	4	+64	36	Promotion to Nemzeti Bajnokság III
2	Csesztreg	12	10	0	2	41	19	+22	30	
3	Semjénháza	13	10	0	3	42	24	+18	30	
4	Zalaszentgrót	12	9	2	1	46	10	+36	29	
5	Andráshida TE	13	7	1	5	32	21	+11	22	
6	Zalakomár	13	6	3	4	42	26	+16	21	
7	Zalalövő	13	6	3	4	26	24	+2	21	
8	Kiskanizsa	12	5	2	5	24	26	−2	17	
9	Gyenesdiás	13	5	1	7	26	34	−8	16	
10	Lenti	13	4	1	8	30	28	+2	13	
11	Hévíz	13	2	4	7	15	31	−16	10	
12	Szepetnek	13	3	0	10	26	35	−9	9	
13	Zalaszentmihály	13	1	1	11	24	56	−32	4	
14	Csácsbozsok-Nemesapáti	13	0	0	13	10	114	−104	0	Relegation to Megyei Bajnokság II

Updated to match(es) played on 28 November 2021. Source: MLSZ.HU
Rules for classification: 1) Points; 2) Head-to-head points; 3) Head-to-head goal difference; 4) Head-to-head goals scored; 5) Head-to-head away goals scored; 6) Goal difference; 7) Goals scored.

== See also ==
- 2021–22 Nemzeti Bajnokság I
- 2021–22 Nemzeti Bajnokság II
- 2021–22 Nemzeti Bajnokság III
- 2021–22 Magyar Kupa
