= 2017–18 Megyei Bajnokság I =

Megyei Bajnokság I
- Season: 2017–18
- Promoted: 9 teams
- Relegated: 38 teams

The 2017–18 Megyei Bajnokság I includes the championships of Counties in Hungary (including Budapest). It is the fourth tier of the Hungarian football league system.

== League table ==
=== Bács-Kiskun ===
Pos	Team	Pld	W	D	L	GF	GA	GD	Pts	Promotion or relegation
1	Kecskeméti LC (C, P)	24	23	0	1	117	14	+103	69	Qualification for promotion play-offs
2	Jánoshalmi FC	24	16	2	6	49	18	+31	50	
3	Kecel FC	24	13	5	6	45	33	+12	44	
4	Kiskunfélegyházi Honvéd TK	24	13	3	8	57	39	+18	42	
5	Kalocsai FC	24	11	4	9	43	39	+4	37	
6	Kiskunhalasi FC	24	10	6	8	37	39	−2	36	
7	Bácsalmási VSE	24	9	5	10	31	45	−14	32	
8	Kiskörösi LC	24	8	5	11	32	42	−10	29	
9	Soltvadkerti TE	24	7	4	13	39	57	−18	25	
10	Lajosmizsei VLC	24	6	5	13	31	49	−18	23	
11	Harta SE	24	6	4	14	36	59	−23	22	
12	Akasztó FC	24	5	5	14	38	63	−25	20	
13	Kunszállás SE (R)	24	3	4	17	22	80	−58	13	Relegation to Megyei Bajnokság II

Source: HFF
(C) Champions; (P) Promoted; (R) Relegated

=== Baranya ===
Pécsvárad rejected NB III participation.

Pos	Team	Pld	W	D	L	GF	GA	GD	Pts	Promotion or relegation
1	Pécsvárad (C)	28	24	2	2	95	19	+76	74	
2	Siklós	28	18	4	6	58	33	+25	58	
3	Mohács	28	16	6	6	66	23	+43	54	
4	Komló	28	16	6	6	60	22	+38	54	
5	Szederkény	28	17	2	9	55	21	+34	53	
6	Pécsi VSK	28	16	1	11	57	33	+24	49	
7	Szászvár	28	13	4	11	66	55	+11	43	
8	PEAC	28	13	3	12	54	50	+4	42	
9	Sellye	28	10	8	10	46	39	+7	38	
10	Szentlőrinc II	28	11	1	16	52	68	−16	34	
11	Bóly	28	10	3	15	39	42	−3	33	
12	Villány	28	7	5	16	51	67	−16	26	
13	Harkány	28	7	4	17	31	60	−29	25	
14	Ócsárd (R)	28	5	3	20	29	89	−60	18	Relegation to Megyei Bajnokság II
15	Boda	28	0	2	26	21	159	−138	2	

Source: HFF
(C) Champions; (R) Relegated

=== Békés ===
Champion Méhkerék were one of the three teams who were drawn first, giving them automatic promotion. However before the following season, the club was disbanded and the newly formed team continued in the sixth division.

==== Regular stage ====
Pos	Team	Pld	W	D	L	GF	GA	GD	Pts	Qualification
1	Méhkerék	22	19	0	3	72	20	+52	57	Qualification for promotion group
2	Békéscsaba II	22	16	4	2	66	15	+51	52	Qualification for promotion group
3	Körösladány	22	14	4	4	49	22	+27	46	Qualification for promotion group
4	Kondoros	22	13	3	6	58	39	+19	42	Qualification for promotion group
5	Szarvas	22	12	4	6	42	35	+7	40	Qualification for promotion group
6	OMTK Rákóczi	22	8	2	12	35	50	−15	26	Qualification for promotion group
7	Gyula	22	7	5	10	32	35	−3	26	Qualification for relegation group
8	Mezőhegyes	22	8	1	13	36	43	−7	25	Qualification for relegation group
9	Jamina	22	5	4	13	25	44	−19	19	Qualification for relegation group
10	Vésztő	22	5	3	14	25	53	−28	18	Qualification for relegation group
11	Szeghalom	22	4	3	15	32	74	−42	15	Qualification for relegation group
12	Dévaványa	22	3	3	16	23	65	−42	12	Qualification for relegation group

Source: HFF

==== Promotion group ====
Pos	Team	Pld	W	D	L	GF	GA	GD	Pts	Promotion
1	Méhkerék (C, R)	32	26	2	4	108	31	+77	80	Relegation to Megyei Bajnokság III
2	Békéscsaba II	32	22	6	4	88	24	+64	72	
3	Körösladány	32	18	7	7	65	34	+31	61	
4	Szarvas	32	17	5	10	63	64	−1	56	
5	Kondoros	32	16	4	12	78	61	+17	52	
6	OMTK Rákóczi (R)	32	8	3	21	38	85	−47	27	Relegation to Megyei Bajnokság III

Source: HFF
(C) Champions; (R) Relegated

==== Relegation group ====
Pos	Team	Pld	W	D	L	GF	GA	GD	Pts	Relegation
1	Mezőhegyes	32	12	2	18	57	62	−5	38	
2	Gyula	32	10	8	14	48	50	−2	38	
3	Jamina	32	10	6	16	44	61	−17	36	
4	Vésztő	32	10	6	16	43	64	−21	36	
5	Szeghalom	32	10	5	17	61	94	−33	35	
6	Dévaványa (R)	32	4	4	24	34	97	−63	16	Relegation to Megyei Bajnokság II

Source: HFF
(R) Relegated

=== Borsod-Abaúj-Zemplén ===
Pos	Team	Pld	W	D	L	GF	GA	GD	Pts	Promotion or relegation
1	Sajóbábony (C, P)	30	23	6	1	101	32	+69	75	Qualification for promotion play-offs
2	Felsőzsolca	30	22	5	3	84	32	+52	71	
3	Ózd (Note: Ózd was deducted 4 points)	30	22	3	5	111	26	+85	65	
4	Mád	30	20	5	5	110	29	+81	65	
5	Edelény	30	16	4	10	73	47	+26	52	
6	Bogács	30	14	4	12	52	45	+7	46	
7	Encs	30	13	7	10	63	46	+17	46	
8	Bőcs	30	14	2	14	66	77	−11	44	
9	Hidasnémeti	30	13	2	15	60	64	−4	41	
10	Onga	30	11	4	15	67	94	−27	37	
11	Gesztely	30	10	4	16	45	66	−21	34	
12	Szerencs	30	10	2	18	49	88	−39	32	
13	Bánhorváti	30	9	3	18	64	63	+1	30	
14	Karcsa (R)	30	7	6	17	41	95	−54	27	Relegation to Megyei Bajnokság II
15	Szendrő (Note: Szendrő was deducted 1 points) (R)	30	4	1	25	46	140	−94	12	Relegation to Megyei Bajnokság II
16	Varbó (Note: Varbó was deducted 4 points) (R)	30	3	0	27	33	121	−88	5	Relegation to Megyei Bajnokság II

Source: HFF
(C) Champions; (P) Promoted; (R) Relegated

=== Budapest ===
Pos	Team	Pld	W	D	L	GF	GA	GD	Pts	Promotion or relegation
1	Rákospalota (C)	30	26	3	1	107	17	+90	81	Qualification for promotion play-offs
2	Újpest II	30	22	5	3	85	26	+59	71	
3	Ikarus	30	18	6	6	75	41	+34	60	
4	Gázgyár	30	16	6	8	55	45	+10	54	
5	Kelen	30	14	9	7	59	33	+26	51	
6	43. Sz. Építők	30	14	7	9	59	49	+10	49	
7	Fővárosi Vízművek	30	13	5	12	51	48	+3	44	
8	Unione	30	12	5	13	61	55	+6	41	
9	Testvériség	30	11	8	11	52	46	+6	41	
10	Pestszentimre	30	8	7	15	44	65	−21	31	
11	Budafok II	30	8	6	16	47	72	−25	30	
12	Rákosszentmihály	30	8	4	18	29	64	−35	28	
13	Újbuda	30	7	3	20	50	102	−52	24	
14	Hegyvidék	30	6	6	18	40	74	−34	24	
15	Testnevelési Egyetem (R)	30	5	9	16	36	52	−16	24	Relegation to Megyei Bajnokság II
16	II. kerület (R)	30	6	3	21	31	92	−61	21	Relegation to Megyei Bajnokság II

Source: HFF
(C) Champions; (R) Relegated

=== Csongrád ===
Algyő rejected NB III participation.

Pos	Team	Pld	W	D	L	GF	GA	GD	Pts	Promotion or relegation
1	Algyő (C)	28	20	2	6	62	25	+37	62	
2	Csongrád	28	18	6	4	72	29	+43	60	
3	Tiszasziget (Note: Tiszasziget was deducted 4 points)	28	20	3	5	74	25	+49	59	
4	Hódmezővásárhely II	28	18	3	7	78	42	+36	57	
5	Szegedi VSE	28	14	9	5	70	31	+39	51	
6	Ásotthalom (R)	28	14	8	6	49	35	+14	50	Relegation to Megyei Bajnokság III
7	Bordány	28	14	5	9	57	43	+14	47	
8	Kiskundorozsma	28	9	9	10	41	50	−9	36	
9	Sándorfalva (R)	28	11	2	15	56	59	−3	35	Relegation to Megyei Bajnokság III
10	Szőreg	28	8	4	16	51	72	−21	28	
11	Szentes	28	8	4	16	37	70	−33	28	
12	FK Szeged	28	5	9	14	39	66	−27	24	
13	Újszeged	28	6	3	19	41	67	−26	21	
14	Zsombó	28	3	7	18	42	93	−51	16	
15	Deszk (R)	28	4	2	22	34	96	−62	14	Relegation to Megyei Bajnokság II

Source: HFF
(C) Champions; (R) Relegated

=== Fejér ===
Pos	Team	Pld	W	D	L	GF	GA	GD	Pts	Promotion or relegation
1	Ikarus-Maroshegy (C)	26	19	2	5	56	32	+24	59	Qualification for promotion play-offs
2	Mór	26	18	5	3	58	15	+43	59	
3	Bicske	26	18	5	3	68	26	+42	59	
4	Gárdony	26	18	3	5	75	32	+43	57	
5	Ercsi	26	16	2	8	72	41	+31	50	
6	Martonvásár	26	10	9	7	55	40	+15	39	
7	Sárosd	26	12	2	12	65	44	+21	38	
8	Sárbogárd	26	11	3	12	48	37	+11	36	
9	Tordas	26	8	7	11	34	48	−14	31	
10	Lajoskomárom	26	6	5	15	33	57	−24	23	
11	Polgárdi	26	6	3	17	36	77	−41	21	
12	Mezőfalva	26	5	5	16	31	70	−39	20	
13	Enying	26	3	4	19	36	98	−62	13	
14	Baracs	26	3	3	20	18	68	−50	12	

Source: HFF
(C) Champions

=== Győr-Moson-Sopron ===
Pos	Team	Pld	W	D	L	GF	GA	GD	Pts	Promotion or relegation
1	Ménfőcsanak (C, P)	30	27	3	0	101	8	+93	84	Qualification for promotion play-offs
2	Lipót	30	26	3	1	141	20	+121	81	
3	Nyúl	30	20	4	6	74	25	+49	64	
4	Öttevény	30	18	5	7	67	30	+37	59	
5	Bácsa	30	16	3	11	57	52	+5	51	
6	Jánossomorja	30	13	3	14	55	47	+8	42	
7	Soproni FAC	30	12	5	13	54	65	−11	41	
8	Beled	30	12	2	16	35	64	−29	38	
9	Győrszentiván	30	10	5	15	48	68	−20	35	
10	Gönyű	30	10	4	16	34	71	−37	34	
11	Fertőszentmiklós	30	9	7	14	41	61	−20	34	
12	Hédervár (R)	30	9	6	15	47	50	−3	33	Relegation to Megyei Bajnokság II
13	Kapuvár	30	9	4	17	35	63	−28	31	
14	Lébény	30	9	4	17	39	73	−34	31	
15	Hegyeshalom (R)	30	4	4	22	41	100	−59	16	Relegation to Megyei Bajnokság II
16	Rajka (Note: Rajka was deducted 6 points) (R)	30	2	6	22	17	89	−72	6	Relegation to Megyei Bajnokság II

Source: HFF
(C) Champions; (P) Promoted; (R) Relegated

=== Hajdú-Bihar ===
Pos	Team	Pld	W	D	L	GF	GA	GD	Pts	Promotion or relegation
1	Hajdúböszörmény (C)	30	28	1	1	162	25	+137	85	Qualification for promotion play-offs
2	Debreceni VSC II	30	26	2	2	138	22	+116	80	
3	Nyíradony	30	23	2	5	160	29	+131	71	
4	Hajdúnánás	30	20	3	7	86	43	+43	63	
5	Berettyóújfalu	30	16	6	8	88	43	+45	54	
6	Derecske (Note: Derecske was deducted 1 points)	30	16	4	10	73	52	+21	51	
7	Monostorpályi	30	16	2	12	66	56	+10	50	
8	Sárrétudvar	30	15	3	12	74	54	+20	48	
9	Hajdúszoboszló	30	12	9	9	93	54	+39	45	
10	Debreceni ASE	30	10	3	17	55	100	−45	33	
11	Hajdúsámson	30	9	2	19	73	92	−19	29	
12	Kaba (Note: Kaba was deducted 5 points)	30	8	2	20	62	96	−34	21	
13	Hosszúpályi (Note: Hosszúpályi was deducted 1 points)	30	7	1	22	48	177	−129	21	
14	Hajdúhadház	30	5	2	23	46	142	−96	17	
15	Hajdúdorog (Note: Hajdúdorog was deducted 4 points) (R)	30	6	2	22	43	110	−67	16	Relegation - Not competed in any division next season
16	Téglás (R)	30	1	0	29	30	202	−172	3	Relegation to Megyei Bajnokság II

Source: HFF
(C) Champions; (R) Relegated

=== Heves ===
Pos	Team	Pld	W	D	L	GF	GA	GD	Pts	Promotion or relegation
1	Eger (C, P)	28	26	2	0	118	21	+97	80	Qualification for promotion play-offs
2	Hatvan	28	24	1	3	104	17	+87	73	
3	Felsőtárkány	28	21	5	2	95	29	+66	68	
4	Gyöngyöshalász	28	15	5	8	76	50	+26	50	
5	Maklár	28	13	5	10	52	54	−2	44	
6	Heves	28	13	4	11	53	48	+5	43	
7	Besenyőtelek	28	10	7	11	42	66	−24	37	
8	Andornaktálya	28	10	5	13	43	51	−8	35	
9	Egerszalók	28	10	5	13	42	52	−10	35	
10	Heréd	28	8	6	14	47	69	−22	30	
11	Borsodnádasd (Note: Borsodnádasd was deducted 1 points)	28	8	3	17	46	78	−32	26	
12	Pétervására	28	7	3	18	38	77	−39	24	
13	Füzesabony	28	6	4	18	28	77	−49	22	
14	Energia	28	5	5	18	36	64	−28	20	
15	Bélapátfalva	28	2	4	22	29	96	−67	10	
16	Boldog (R)	0	0	0	0	0	0	0	0	Exclution and Relegation to Megyei Bajnokság III

Source: HFF
(C) Champions; (P) Promoted; (R) Relegated

=== Jász-Nagykun-Szolnok ===
Pos	Team	Pld	W	D	L	GF	GA	GD	Pts	Promotion or relegation
1	Szajol (C)	30	26	2	2	113	21	+92	80	Qualification for promotion play-offs
2	Jánoshida	30	21	1	8	97	36	+61	64	
3	Jászárokszállás	30	19	5	6	87	34	+53	62	
4	Karcag	30	17	3	10	70	55	+15	54	
5	Újszászi	30	16	5	9	60	40	+20	53	
6	Csépa	30	17	1	12	73	66	+7	52	
7	Mezőtúr	30	16	3	11	93	53	+40	51	
8	Törökszentmiklós	30	16	3	11	69	38	+31	51	
9	Jászfényszaru	30	13	7	10	62	46	+16	46	
10	Tószeg	30	12	5	13	50	50	0	41	
11	Fegyvernek	30	11	5	14	55	74	−19	38	
12	Kisújszállás	30	10	2	18	62	91	−29	32	
13	Rákóczifalva	30	7	4	19	37	94	−57	25	
14	Tiszaföldvár	30	3	6	21	32	96	−64	15	
15	Jászkisér (Note: Jászkisér was deducted 2 points)	30	4	4	22	39	80	−41	14	
16	Besenyszög	30	4	0	26	36	161	−125	12	

Source: HFF
(C) Champions

=== Komárom-Esztergom ===
Pos	Team	Pld	W	D	L	GF	GA	GD	Pts	Promotion or relegation
1	Komárom (C, P)	28	26	1	1	175	16	+159	79	Qualification for promotion play-offs
2	Zsámbék	28	22	2	4	77	20	+57	68	
3	Oroszlány	28	20	3	5	76	34	+42	63	
4	Tata	28	17	4	7	71	44	+27	55	
5	Vértesszőlős	28	17	2	9	64	45	+19	53	
6	Esztergom	28	14	6	8	49	40	+9	48	
7	Sárisáp	28	12	5	11	58	50	+8	41	
8	Bábolna	28	12	4	12	44	42	+2	40	
9	Kecskéd	28	11	6	11	59	65	−6	39	
10	Nyergesújfalu	28	10	3	15	67	73	−6	33	
11	Koppánymonostor	28	7	6	15	38	58	−20	27	
12	Vértessomló	28	6	5	17	39	92	−53	23	
13	Nagyigmánd	28	6	2	20	44	78	−34	20	
14	Ács (Note: Ács was deducted 4 points)	28	4	1	23	51	135	−84	9	
15	Bokod (R)	28	1	0	27	27	147	−120	3	Relegation to Megyei Bajnokság II
16	Tát (R)	0	0	0	0	0	0	0	0	Exclution and Relegation to Megyei Bajnokság III

Source: HFF
(C) Champions; (P) Promoted; (R) Relegated

=== Nógrád ===
Pos	Team	Pld	W	D	L	GF	GA	GD	Pts	Promotion or relegation
1	Salgótarján (C, P)	22	21	1	0	105	11	+94	64	Qualification for promotion play-offs
2	Karancslapujtő	22	15	3	4	70	30	+40	48	
3	Érsekvadkert	22	15	0	7	54	36	+18	45	
4	Berkenye	22	14	3	5	69	28	+41	45	
5	Szécsény	22	11	2	9	57	25	+32	35	
6	Pásztó	22	10	3	9	50	45	+5	33	
7	Cered	22	9	1	12	60	56	+4	28	
8	Palotás	22	9	0	13	38	65	−27	27	
9	Rimóc	22	6	3	13	47	75	−28	21	
10	Karancsberény (R)	22	5	2	15	52	98	−46	17	Relegation to Megyei Bajnokság II
11	Mátranovák (Note: Mátranovák was deducted 1 points) (R)	22	5	1	16	34	78	−44	15	Dissolved
12	Héhalom	22	2	1	19	16	105	−89	7	

Source: HFF
(C) Champions; (P) Promoted; (R) Relegated

=== Pest ===
Pos	Team	Pld	W	D	L	GF	GA	GD	Pts	Promotion or relegation
1	Taksony (C, P)	28	19	5	4	67	22	+45	62	Qualification for promotion play-offs
2	Dabas–Gyón	28	18	7	3	63	26	+37	61	
3	Nagykőrös	28	17	4	7	46	31	+15	55	
4	Nagykáta	28	15	6	7	45	31	+14	51	
5	Biatorbágy	28	16	2	10	62	40	+22	50	
6	Pilis	28	13	7	8	42	26	+16	46	
7	Dunavarsány	28	13	3	12	54	52	+2	42	
8	Tápiószecső	28	11	6	11	49	44	+5	39	
9	Maglód	28	11	5	12	53	44	+9	38	
10	Százhalombatta	28	9	5	14	40	63	−23	32	
11	Tököl	28	8	7	13	36	46	−10	31	
12	Szentendre	28	8	6	14	43	65	−22	30	
13	Gödöllő	28	8	5	15	40	45	−5	29	
14	FC Dabas II (R)	28	8	2	18	42	66	−24	26	Relegation to Megyei Bajnokság II
15	Sülysáp (R)	28	0	2	26	22	103	−81	2	Relegation to Megyei Bajnokság III
16	Szigetszentmiklós (R)	0	0	0	0	0	0	0	0	Dissolved

Source: HFF
(C) Champions; (P) Promoted; (R) Relegated

=== Somogy ===
Pos	Team	Pld	W	D	L	GF	GA	GD	Pts	Promotion or relegation
1	Nagyatád (C)	30	28	1	1	107	18	+89	85	Qualification for promotion play-offs
2	Balatonlelle	30	24	1	5	101	30	+71	73	
3	Balatoni Vasas	30	21	5	4	84	31	+53	68	
4	Somogysárd	30	16	3	11	79	62	+17	51	
5	Toponár	30	15	5	10	62	66	−4	50	
6	Balatonkeresztúr	30	12	6	12	39	53	−14	42	
7	Babócsa	30	12	5	13	48	69	−21	41	
8	Kadarkút	30	12	4	14	47	48	−1	40	
9	Nagybajom	30	10	5	15	46	54	−8	35	
10	Marcali	30	10	2	18	41	56	−15	32	
11	Segesd	30	9	5	16	47	71	−24	32	
12	Magyaregres	30	9	4	17	36	62	−26	31	
13	Tab	30	9	3	18	42	50	−8	30	
14	Csurgó	30	9	3	18	43	81	−38	30	
15	Fonyód (R)	30	9	2	19	40	64	−24	29	Relegation to Megyei Bajnokság II
16	Karád (R)	30	6	4	20	39	86	−47	22	Relegation to Megyei Bajnokság II

Source: HFF
(C) Champions; (R) Relegated

=== Szabolcs-Szatmár-Bereg ===
Pos	Team	Pld	W	D	L	GF	GA	GD	Pts	Promotion or relegation
1	Sényő (C, P)	30	27	2	1	98	16	+82	83	Qualification for promotion play-offs
2	Nyírgyulaj	30	20	5	5	62	36	+26	65	
3	Nagyhalászi	30	17	9	4	57	21	+36	60	
4	Vásárosnamény	30	15	5	10	74	39	+35	50	
5	Nagyecsed	30	14	7	9	50	37	+13	49	
6	Balkány (Note: Balkány was deducted 1 points)	30	14	6	10	52	38	+14	47	
7	Tiszavasvári	30	14	5	11	52	45	+7	47	
8	Mándok	30	13	7	10	51	44	+7	46	
9	Tarpa	30	9	9	12	42	51	−9	36	
10	Baktalórántháza	30	10	5	15	39	44	−5	35	
11	Mátészalka	30	9	8	13	41	57	−16	35	
12	Tuzsér (R)	30	9	6	15	33	49	−16	33	Relegation to Megyei Bajnokság III
13	Fehérgyarmat	30	7	8	15	36	57	−21	29	
14	Dombrád (R)	30	7	4	19	31	58	−27	25	Relegation to Megyei Bajnokság II
15	Rakamaz (R)	30	6	3	21	27	75	−48	21	Relegation to Megyei Bajnokság II
16	Kótaj (R)	30	2	5	23	23	101	−78	11	Relegation to Megyei Bajnokság II

Source: HFF
(C) Champions; (P) Promoted; (R) Relegated

=== Tolna ===
Tolna did not take NB III participation.

Pos	Team	Pld	W	D	L	GF	GA	GD	Pts	Promotion or relegation
1	Tolna (C)	24	17	3	4	96	30	+66	54	
2	Bonyhád	24	17	2	5	73	30	+43	53	
3	Majos	24	16	3	5	76	40	+36	51	
4	Dombóvár	24	14	8	2	84	34	+50	50	
5	Dunaföldvár	24	14	4	6	72	40	+32	46	
6	Tamási	24	11	10	3	86	45	+41	43	
7	Szedres	24	11	4	9	61	44	+17	37	
8	Tevel	24	8	2	14	50	60	−10	26	
9	Bátaszék	24	7	5	12	55	57	−2	26	
10	Kölesd	24	5	5	14	40	62	−22	20	
11	Kakasd (Note: Kakasd was deducted 3 points)	24	6	1	17	51	107	−56	16	
12	Nagymányok (R)	24	4	3	17	55	94	−39	15	Relegation to Megyei Bajnokság II
13	Őcsény (R)	24	1	0	23	18	174	−156	3	Relegation to Megyei Bajnokság II

Source: HFF
(C) Champions; (R) Relegated

=== Vas ===
Pos	Team	Pld	W	D	L	GF	GA	GD	Pts	Promotion or relegation
1	Sárvár (C, P)	30	29	1	0	122	12	+110	88	Qualification for promotion play-offs
2	Celldömölk	30	21	8	1	84	24	+60	71	
3	Körmend	30	17	5	8	79	38	+41	56	
4	Répcelak	30	16	5	9	45	38	+7	53	
5	Lukácsháza	30	15	7	8	70	53	+17	52	
6	Király	30	14	4	12	68	53	+15	46	
7	Szentgotthárd	30	13	6	11	48	48	0	45	
8	Jánosháza	30	12	6	12	51	70	−19	42	
9	Vasvár	30	12	4	14	67	62	+5	40	
10	Vép	30	11	4	15	43	56	−13	37	
11	Egyházasrádóc (Note: Egyházasrádóc was deducted 3 points)	30	11	2	17	54	60	−6	32	
12	Kőszeg	30	9	3	18	40	71	−31	30	
13	Rum	30	6	4	20	33	66	−33	22	
14	Rábapatyi	30	5	6	19	33	77	−44	21	
15	Ikervár	30	6	1	23	42	116	−74	19	
16	Vasszécseny (Note: Vasszécseny was deducted 15 points)	30	9	2	19	51	86	−35	14	

Source: HFF
(C) Champions; (P) Promoted

=== Veszprém ===
Pos	Team	Pld	W	D	L	GF	GA	GD	Pts	Promotion or relegation
1	Balatonfüred (Note: Balatonfüred was deducted 4 points) (C)	30	27	0	3	136	16	+120	77	Qualification for promotion play-offs
2	Úrkút	30	25	2	3	94	17	+77	77	
3	Tihany	30	18	3	9	76	46	+30	57	
4	Balatonalmádi	30	13	7	10	55	44	+11	46	
5	Fűzfő	30	12	9	9	52	39	+13	45	
6	Várpalota	30	13	5	12	64	49	+15	44	
7	Sümeg	30	11	9	10	48	55	−7	42	
8	Ajka SE (Note: Ajka SE was deducted 4 points)	30	13	6	11	72	61	+11	41	
9	Gyulafirátót	30	10	9	11	57	60	−3	39	
10	Magyarpolány	30	11	5	14	64	78	−14	38	
11	Csetény	30	11	5	14	54	87	−33	38	
12	Devecser	30	10	3	17	52	81	−29	33	
13	Zirc	30	9	4	17	51	76	−25	31	
14	Ugod (R)	30	9	2	19	40	82	−42	29	Relegation to Megyei Bajnokság II
15	Pét (R)	30	5	4	21	26	91	−65	19	Relegation to Megyei Bajnokság II
16	Berhida (R)	30	2	9	19	35	94	−59	15	Relegation to Megyei Bajnokság II

Source: HFF
(C) Champions; (R) Relegated

=== Zala ===
Pos	Team	Pld	W	D	L	GF	GA	GD	Pts	Promotion or relegation
1	Nagykanizsa (C, P)	30	26	2	2	140	16	+124	80	Qualification for promotion play-offs
2	Hévíz	30	22	5	3	107	16	+91	71	
3	Olajmunkás	30	20	6	4	98	34	+64	66	
4	Csácsbozsok-Nemesapáti	30	18	4	8	77	46	+31	58	
5	Szepetnek	30	17	4	9	80	43	+37	55	
6	Csesztreg	30	17	1	12	74	63	+11	52	
7	Teskánd	30	15	6	9	65	51	+14	51	
8	Lenti	30	13	5	12	62	57	+5	44	
9	Zalalövő	30	13	5	12	58	57	+1	44	
10	Semjénháza	30	12	4	14	59	65	−6	40	
11	Gyenesdiás (Note: Gyenesdiás was deducted 1 points)	30	10	5	15	71	68	+3	34	
12	Zalaszentgrót	30	9	3	18	51	69	−18	30	
13	Becsehely	30	6	3	21	47	115	−68	21	
14	Keszthely	30	4	7	19	32	92	−60	19	
15	Kiskanizsa (Note: Kiskanizsa was deducted 1 points)	30	4	5	21	35	111	−76	16	
16	Pókaszepetk (Note: Pókaszepetk was deducted 4 points) (R)	30	1	1	28	16	169	−153	0	Relegation to Megyei Bajnokság III

Source: HFF
(C) Champions; (P) Promoted; (R) Relegated

== Promotion play-offs ==
The draw was held on 5 June 2018. The first legs were played on 9 June, and the second legs were played on 16 June. Taksony, Sényő and Méhkerék gained direct promotion however the latter got dissolved than reestablished in the Megyei Bajnokság III after this season.

=== Matches ===
Team 1	Agg.	Team 2	1st leg	2nd leg
Rákospalota	0–1	Sárvár	0–0	0–1 (a.e.t.)
Eger	6–1	Balatonfüred	5–1	1–0
Szajol	4–4 (a)	Sajóbábony	3–2	1–2
Komárom	4–1	Ikarus-Maroshegy	2–0	2–1
Nagykanizsa	7–0	Nagyatád	5–0	2–0
Kecskemét	5–3	Hajdúböszörmény	4–0	1–3
Ménfőcsanak	4–3	Salgótarján	4–2	0–1

==== Details ====
All times Central European Summer Time (UTC+2)

9 June 2018
17:30

Rákospalota	0–0	Sárvár
	Report

Budai II. László Stadion, Budapest
Referee: József Ducsai
16 June 2018
17:00

Sárvár	1–0 (a.e.t.)	Rákospalota
Venczel 116'	Report

Sárvári Sporttelep, Sárvár
Attendance: 1,000
Referee: Tibor Horváth

Sárvár won 1–0 on aggregate and are promoted to the Nemzeti Bajnokság III.

9 June 2018
17:30

Eger	5–1	Balatonfüred
Á. Vajda 6'; N. Benke 36', 53'; Z. Antal 74'; Gresó 86' (pen.)	Report	M. Udvardi 38'

Szentmarjay Tibor Városi Stadion, Eger
Attendance: 550
Referee: Róbert Nagy
16 June 2018
17:00

Balatonfüred	0–1	Eger
	Report	Á. Vajda 10'

Balatonfüredi Városi Sportpálya, Balatonfüred
Attendance: 100
Referee: Bálint Dolnegó

Eger won 6–1 on aggregate and are promoted to the Nemzeti Bajnokság III.

9 June 2018
17:30

Szajol	3–2	Sajóbábony
D. Dobos 24', 37'; T. Szabó 55'	Report	N. Erdei-Nagy 8'; B. Sebők 83'

Szajol Sporttelep, Szajol
Attendance: 600
Referee: Tamás Takács
16 June 2018
17:00

Sajóbábony	2–1	Szajol
B. Sebők 14'; C. Lázi 82'	Report	D. Dobos 87'

Borostyán Mihály Sportközpont, Sajóbábony
Attendance: 600
Referee: Norbert Nagy

4–4 on aggregate. Sajóbábony won on away goals and are promoted to the Nemzeti Bajnokság III.

9 June 2018
18:00

Komárom	2–0	Ikarus-Maroshegy
Kenesei 6'; Z. Solymos 66'	Report

Czibor Zoltán Városi Sporttelep, Komárom
Attendance: 800
Referee: Dr Gergely Kovács
16 June 2018
17:00

Ikarus-Maroshegy	1–2	Komárom
J. Bencze 56'	Report	Z. Solymos 9' (pen.); Kenesei 33'

Mezővári József Sportpálya, Székesfehérvár
Attendance: 610
Referee: Dr Bence Csonka

Komárom won 4–1 on aggregate and are promoted to the Nemzeti Bajnokság III.

9 June 2018
17:30

Nagykanizsa	5–0	Nagyatád
G. Kovács 12'; J. Csáki 45'; A. Péntek 56', 76'; R. Kulcsár 83'	Report

Olajbányász Sporttelep, Nagykanizsa
Attendance: 3,000
Referee: Ákos Gaál
16 June 2018
17:00

Nagyatád	0–2	Nagykanizsa
	Report	D. Horváth 62'; D. Szalai 88'

Mudin Imre Sportcentrum, Nagyatád
Attendance: 700
Referee: Ádám Leél-Őssy

Nagykanizsa won 7–0 on aggregate and are promoted to the Nemzeti Bajnokság III.

9 June 2018
17:30

Kecskemét	4–0	Hajdúböszörmény
Farkas 9', 29'; Balog 62'; Z. Selyem 89'	Report

Széktói Stadion, Kecskemét
Attendance: 700
Referee: Gergő Bogár
16 June 2018
17:00

Hajdúböszörmény	3–1	Kecskemét
Jeremiás 17' (pen.); B. Barna 20'; Lippai 66'	Report	S. Vladul 45+4'

Hajdúböszörmény Városi Sport- és Rendezvényközpont, Hajdúböszörmény
Attendance: 180
Referee: József Ducsai

Kecskemét won 5–3 on aggregate and are promoted to the Nemzeti Bajnokság III.

9 June 2018
17:30

Ménfőcsanak	4–2	Salgótarján
P. Püspök 25', 52'; Weitner 30'; Z. Böcskey 32'	Report	G. Bata 49'; B. Híves 90+1'

Bezerédi utcai Pálya, Győr
Referee: Tibor Horváth
16 June 2018
17:00

Salgótarján	1–0	Ménfőcsanak
M. Tarlósi 28' (pen.)	Report

Szojka Ferenc Stadion, Salgótarján
Attendance: 900
Referee: Roland Veizer

Ménfőcsanak won 4–3 on aggregate and are promoted to the Nemzeti Bajnokság III.

== Promoted teams ==
Form of promotion	No	Teams
Play-off winners	7	Eger, Kecskemét, Komárom, Ménfőcsanak, Nagykanizsa, Sajóbábony, Sárvár
Direct promotion	2	Taksony, Sényő
Replenished after withdrawals	1	Salgótarján (Note: MTK II, Soproni VSE and Méhkerék who struggled with dissolution did not take NB III participation thereby Salgótarján took the opportunity.)

== See also ==
- 2017–18 Magyar Kupa
- 2018 Magyar Kupa Final
- 2017–18 Nemzeti Bajnokság II
- 2017–18 Nemzeti Bajnokság III
