= Megyei Bajnokság I =

Hungarian fourth-tier association football league

- Founded: 1944
- Country: Hungary
- Level on pyramid: 4
- Promotion to: Nemzeti Bajnokság III
- Relegation to: Megyei Bajnokság II
- Domestic cup: Hungarian Cup
- Current: 2026–27 Megyei Bajnokság I

Megyei Bajnokság I is the fourth tier of Hungarian football league system. It includes the championships of the 20 counties of Hungary. The champions might be promoted to the Nemzeti Bajnokság III.

== Champions ==
| County | 2017–18 | 2018–19 | 2019–20 | 2020–21 | 2021–22 | 2022–23 | 2023–24 | 2024–25 | 2025–26 |
|---|---|---|---|---|---|---|---|---|---|
| Bács-Kiskun | Kecskeméti LC | | | | | | Tiszakécske LC II | Tiszakécske LC II | |
| Baranya | Pécsváradi Spartacus^{1} | | | | | | Villány | | |
| Békés | Méhkeréki SE^{1} | | | | | | Gyulai FC | | |
| Borsod-Abaúj-Zemplén | Sajóbábony VSE | | | | | | Ózd-Sajóvölgye | | |
| Budapest | Rákospalotai EAC | | | | | | Csepel TC | | |
| Csongrád-Csanád | Algyő SK^{1} | | | | | | Szegedi VSE | | |
| Fejér | Maroshegy SE | | | | | | | | |
| Győr-Moson-Sopron | Ménfőcsanaki SE | | | | | | | | |
| Hajdú-Bihar | Hajdúböszörményi TE^{1} | | | | | | | | |
| Heves | Eger SE | | | | | | | | |
| Jász-Nagykun-Szolnok | Szajol KLK | | | | | | | | |
| Komárom-Esztergom | Komárom VSE | | | | | | | | |
| Nógrád | Salgótarjáni BTC | | | | | | | | |
| Pest | Taksony SE | | | | | | | | |
| Somogy | Nagyatádi FC | | | | | | | | |
| Szabolcs-Szatmár-Bereg | Sényő FC | | | | | | | | |
| Tolna | Tolna VFC^{1} | | | | | | | | |
| Vas | Sárvári FC | | | | | | | | |
| Veszprém | Balatonfüredi FC | | | | | | | | |
| Zala | Nagykanizsa FC | | | | | | | | |

Notes

- Note 1: did not want to compete in Nemzeti Bajnokság III
