= Ménfőcsanaki SE =

Hungarian football club

- Full name: Ménfőcsanaki Sportegyesület
- Founded: 1923; 103 years ago
- League: NB III
- 2017–18: MB I, Győr-Moson-Sopron, 1st (promoted)
Home colours

Ménfőcsanaki Sportegyesület is a professional football club based in Győr, Győr-Moson-Sopron County, Hungary, that competes in the Nemzeti Bajnokság III, the third tier of Hungarian football.

== Name changes ==
- 2017–present: Herold Trans-Ménfőcsanak ESK

== Season results ==
The table below shows the seasons of ESK Ménfőcsanak.

Season	Tier	Club's name	Position	Pts
1947–48	5	Ménfőcsanaki SE	6 / 11	23
1948–49	5	Ménfőcsanaki SE	4 / 9	14
1949–50	5	Ménfőcsanaki SE	2 / 16	38
1950	5	Ménfőcsanaki DISz	6 / 14	14
1951	4	Ménfőcsanak	0 / 5	
1952	4	Ménfőcsanak	0 / 10	
1957	6	Ménfőcsanak	0 / 12	
1957–58	5	Ménfőcsanak	6 / 12	22
1958–59	5	Ménfőcsanak	5 / 13	25
1959–60	5	Ménfőcsanak	3 / 13	27
1960–61	5	Ménfőcsanak	0 / 14	
1961–62	6	Ménfőcsanak	0 / 8	
1962–63	5	Ménfőcsanak	0 / 7	
1964	6	Ménfőcsanak	10 / 14	24
1965	6	Ménfőcsanak	0 / 12	
1966	6	Ménfőcsanak	4 / 12	
1967	6	Ménfőcsanak	11 / 14	21
1968	6	Ménfőcsanak	9 / 14	19
1969	6	Ménfőcsanak	7 / 14	23
1970	6	Ménfőcsanak	5 / 16	20
1970–71	6	Győr-Ménfőcsanak	1 / 13	32
1971–72	6	Ménfőcsanak	1 / 13	
1972–73	6	Győr-Ménfőcsanak	3 / 16	42
1973–74	6	Győr-Ménfőcsanak	1 / 14	39
1974–75	5	Ménfőcsanak	3 / 16	42
1975–76	5	Ménfőcsanaki TSZ SK	1 / 16	50
1976–77	4	Ménfőcsanak	9 / 18	36
1977–78	4	Ménfőcsanak	6 / 18	35
1978–79	3	Győr-Ménfőcsanak	10 / 18	30
1979–80	3	Győr-Ménfőcsanak	7 / 18	38
1980–81	3	Győr-Ménfőcsanaki TSz SK	10 / 18	30
1981–82	4	Győr-Ménfőcsanaki TSz SK	9 / 16	31
1982–83	4	Győr-Ménfőcsanak	11 / 16	26
1983–84	4	Győr-Ménfőcsanak	7 / 16	32
1984–85	4	Győr-Ménfőcsanak	5 / 16	37
1985–86	4	Győr-Ménfőcsanak	7 / 16	32
1986–87	4	Győr-Ménfőcsanak	12 / 16	27
1987–88	4	Győr-Ménfőcsanak SE	14 / 16	22
1988–89	5	Győr-Ménfőcsanak	1 / 14	40
1989–90	4	Győr-Ménfőcsanak	12 / 16	27
1990–91	4	Győr-Ménfőcsanak SE	3 / 16	40
1991–92	4	Győr-Ménfőcsanak	6 / 16	32
1992–93	4	Győr Ménfőcsanak	2 / 16	46
1993–94	4	Győr-Ménfőcsanak	5 / 16	36
1994–95	4	Győr-Ménfőcsanak SE	1 / 16	70
1995–96	3	Győr-Ménfőcsanak SE	12 / 16	35
1996–97	3	Győr-Ménfőcsanak	14 / 16	29
1997–98	4	Győr-Ménfőcsanak	16 / 16	12
1998–99	5	Győr-Ménfőcsanak	12 / 18	42
1999–00	5	Győr-Ménfőcsanak	17 / 18	24
2000–01	6	Győr-Ménfőcsanak	9 / 16	45
2001–02	6	Győr-Ménfőcsanak	13 / 16	34
2002–03	6	Győr-Ménfőcsanak	5 / 16	49
2003–04	6	Győr-Ménfőcsanak	4 / 16	55
2004–05	6	Győr-Ménfőcsanak	1 / 16	76
2005–06	4	ESK Ménfőcsanak	11 / 16	34
2006–07	4	Ménfőcsanak ESK	6 / 16	45
2007–08	4	WHB Ménfőcsanak SE	10 / 16	36
2008–09	4	Ménfőcsanak ESK	5 / 16	57
2009–10	4	Ménfőcsanak ESK	6 / 16	45
2010–11	4	WHB-Ménfőcsanak	5 / 16	46
2011–12	4	WHB-Ménfőcsanak ESK	2 / 16	66
2012–13	4	WHB Ménfőcsanak ESK	2 / 16	67
2013–14	4	WHB-Ménfőcsanak ESK	4 / 16	59
2014–15	4	WHB-Ménfőcsanak ESK	3 / 16	51
2015–16	4	WHB-Ménfőcsanak ESK	6 / 15	42
2016–17	4	WHB-Ménfőcsanak ESK	2 / 14	62
2017–18	4	Herold Trans-Ménfőcsanak ESK	1 / 16	84
2018–19	3	Herold Trans-Ménfőcsanak ESK	7 / 16	41
2019–20	3	Herold Trans-Ménfőcsanak ESK	4 / 16	30
2020–21	3	Sza-Bi Qualit-Ménfőcsanak ESK	19 / 20	29
2021–22	4	Sza-Bi Qualit-Ménfőcsanak ESK	8 / 16	51
2022–23	4	Sza-Bi Qualit-Ménfőcsanak ESK	15 / 15	6
2023–24	4	Ménfőcsanak ESK	11 / 13	18
2024–25	4	LAVILL ESK Ménfőcsanak	13 / 16	25
2025–26	4	ESK Ménfőcsanak	10 / 14	24
