= Sajóbábony =

- Town
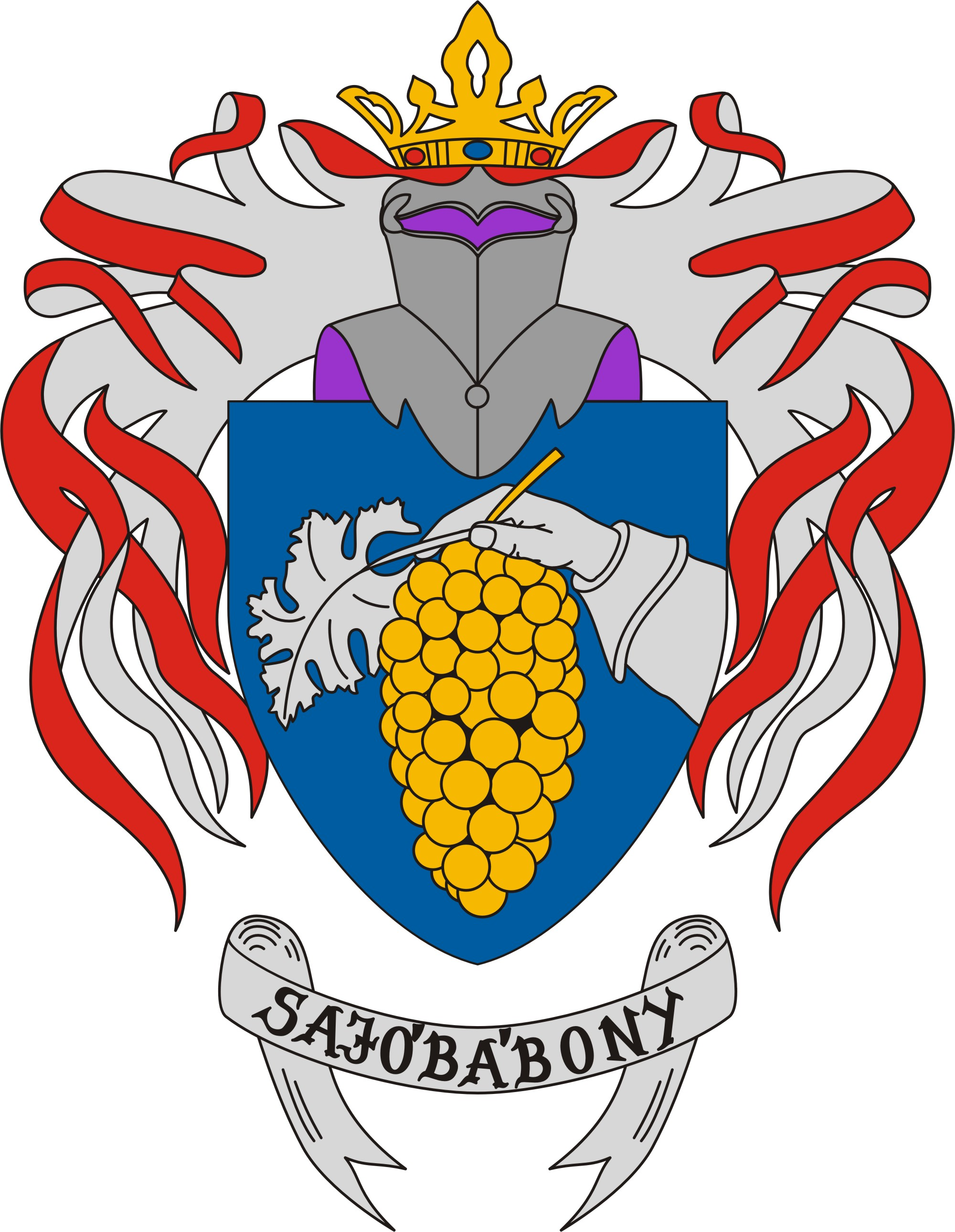
- Coat of arms

- Location within Hungary
- Coordinates: 48.17417°N 20.73730°E
- Country: Hungary
- County: Borsod-Abaúj-Zemplén
- District: Miskolc

Area
  - Total: 13.45 km^{2} (5.19 sq mi)

Population (2008)
  - Total: 2,978
  - Density: 221.41/km^{2} (573.4/sq mi)
- Time zone: UTC+1 (CET)
  - Summer (DST): UTC+2 (CEST)
- Postal code: 3792
- Area code: (+36) 46
- Website: www.sajobabony.hu

Sajóbábony is a town in Borsod-Abaúj-Zemplén County in northeastern Hungary.
