= Sárvári FC =

Hungarian football club

- Full name: Sárvári Futball Club
- Founded: 1997; 29 years ago
- Ground: Sárvári Sporttelep
- Capacity: 1,750
- League: NB III
- 2017–18: MB I, Vas, 1st (promoted)
Home colours

Sárvári Futball Club is a professional football club based in Sárvár, Vas County, Hungary, that competes in the Nemzeti Bajnokság III, the third tier of Hungarian football.

== History ==
On 14 September 2024, they were eliminated by FC Sopron from the 2024–25 Magyar Kupa season. The match ended with a 2-0 defeat.

== Name changes ==
- 1997–00: Sárvári Futball Club
- 2000: merger with Sárvári Vasas
- 2000–01: no teams competed
- 2001–present: Sárvári Futball Club

== Seasons ==
The table below shows the seasons of Sárvári FC.

Season	Tier	Club's name	Position	Pts
1997–98	3	Sárvári FC	10 / 16	40
1998–99	3	Sárvári FC	5 / 16	44
1999–00	3	Sárvári FC	9 / 16	34
2000–01	-	-	-	-
2001–02	3	Sárvári FC	5 / 13	38
2002–03	3	Sárvári FC	5 / 12	46
2002–03	3	Sárvár FC	5 / 12	36
2003–04	3	Sárvári FC	7 / 16	40
2004–05	4	Sárvári FC	11 / 14	26
2005–06	3	Sárvári FC	2 / 16	57
2006–07	3	Sárvári FC	3 / 14	49
2007–08	3	Sárvári FC	4 / 18	63
2008–09	3	Sárvári FC	5 / 16	56
2009–10	3	Sárvári FC	7 / 14	35
2010–11	3	Sárvári FC	7 / 16	48
2011–12	3	Sárvár FC	13 / 15	25
2012–13	3	Sárvári FC	8 / 14	35
2013–14	4	Sárvár FC	1 / 16	82
2014–15	3	Sárvár FC	9 / 16	35
2015–16	3	Sárvár FC	16 / 17	20
2016–17	3	Sárvár FC	14 / 18	33
2017–18	4	Sárvári FC	1 / 16	88
2018–19	3	Sárvári FC	12 / 16	32
2019–20	3	Sárvári FC	13 / 16	20
2020–21	4	Sárvári FC	1 / 17	74
2021–22	4	Sárvári FC	1 / 16	76
2022–23	4	Sárvári FC	8 / 16	39
2023–24	4	Sárvár FC	4 / 16	66
2024–25	4	Sárvári FC	2 / 13	52
2025–26	4	Sárvári FC	2 / 12	69
