= Nagyatádi FC =

Hungarian football club

- Full name: Nagyatádi Futball Club
- Founded: 1926; 100 years ago
- Ground: Városi Sporttelep
- League: MB I
- 2022–23: MB I, Somogy, 1st of 15
Home colours	Away colours

Nagyatádi Futball Club is a professional football club based in Nagyatád, Somogy County, Hungary. The club competes in the Somogy county league.

== Name changes ==
- 1926–?: Nagyatádi Turul Sport Egyesület
- ?-1945: Nagyatádi Levente SE
- 1945–1946: Nagyatádi MSE
- 1946-147: Nagyatádi KTE
- 1947–1951: Nagyatádi Munkás TE
- 1951–1957: Nagyatádi Vörös Lobogó SK
- 1957–1966: Nagyatádi Kinizsi SK
- 1966: the football department became defunct
- 1967: takeover by Nagyatádi MTE
- 1966–1967: Nagyatádi Munkás TE
- 1967: merger with Nagyatádi Konzervgyár SE
- 1967–1970: Nagyatádi Konzervgyár SE
- 1970–1980: Nagyatádi Kinizsi
- 1980–1998: Nagyatádi Városi SE
- 1998–present: Nagyatádi Futball Club

== Honours ==
- Nemzeti Bajnokság III:
  - Runners-up (1): 2009–10
- Megyei Bajnokság I:
  - Winners (6): 1971–72, 1981–82, 1990–91, 1997–98, 2017–18, 2022–23
  - Runners-up (8): 1970, 1970–71, 1995–96, 2000–01, 2016–17, 2018–19, 2019–20, 2021–22
