= Sajóbábony VSE =

Hungarian football club

- Full name: Sajóbábony Vegyész Sportegyesület
- Founded: 1952; 74 years ago
- League: NB III
- 2017–18: MB I, Borsod-Abaúj-Zemplén, 1st (promoted)
Home colours

Sajóbábony Vegyész Sportegyesület is a professional football club based in Sajóbábony, Borsod-Abaúj-Zemplén County, Hungary, that competes in the Nemzeti Bajnokság III, the third tier of Hungarian football.

== Name changes ==
- 2015–present: Sajóbábonyi Vegyész SE

== Seasons ==
The table shows the seasons of Sajóbábonyi Vegyész SE.

Season	Tier	Club's name	Position	Pts
1952	4	Sajóbábony	0 / 16	
1955	4	Sajóbábony	7 / 12	19
1956	4	Sajóbábony	6 / 12	11
1957	4	Sajóbábonyi Lombik	7 / 7	6
1957–58	5	Sajóbábonyi Lombik	13 / 16	19
1958–59	5	Sajóbábony	2 / 8	19
1959–60	5	Sajóbábonyi TC	9 / 12	16
1960–61	6	Sajóbábony I.	2 / 10	16
1962–63	5	Sajóbábonyi TC	8 / 16	33
1963	6	Sajóbábonyi TC	6 / 16	18
1964	6	Sajóbábonyi TC	4 / 16	36
1965	6	Sajóbábonyi TC	9 / 16	30
1966	6	Sajóbábony	0 / 18	
1967	6	Sajóbábony	8 / 16	28
1968	6	Sajóbábony	9 / 16	25
1969	6	Sajóbábony	3 / 16	38
1970	6	Sajóbábony	2 / 16	24
1970–71	6	Sajóbábony	1 / 16	51
1971–72	5	Sajóbábonyi TC	4 / 16	40
1972–73	5	Sajóbábony	2 / 16	40
1973–74	5	Sajóbábonyi Vegyész SE	2 / 16	44
1974–75	4	Sajóbábony	5 / 18	41
1975–76	4	Sajóbábony	12 / 17	29
1976–77	4	Sajóbábonyi Vegyész	15 / 20	34
1977–78	4	Sajóbábony	8 / 20	38
1978–79	3	Sajóbábony	14 / 18	27
1979–80	3	Sajóbábony	12 / 18	30
1980–81	3	Sajóbábonyi Vegyész	5 / 18	46
1981–82	3	Sajóbábonyi Vegyész	13 / 16	28
1982–83	4	Sajóbábonyi Vegyész	1 / 14	44
1983–84	3	Sajóbábonyi Vegyész	13 / 16	26
1984–85	3	Sajóbábony	8 / 16	31
1985–86	3	Sajóbábonyi Vegyész SE	4 / 17	38
1986–87	3	Sajóbábonyi Vegyész SE	12 / 16	29
1987–88	3	Sajóbábonyi Vegyész	16 / 16	15
1988–89	4	Sajóbábony	3 / 16	43
1989–90	3	Sajóbábonyi Vegyész	14 / 16	34
1989–90	4	Sajóbábony	15 / 16	
1990–91	3	Sajóbábonyi Vegyész SE	14 / 16	21
1991–92	3	Sajóbábony	9 / 16	28
1992–93	3	Sajóbábonyi Vegyész SE	15 / 16	17
1993–94	4	Sajóbábony	15 / 16	11
1994–95	4	Sajóbábonyi Vegyész SE	18 / 18	23
1996–97	6	Sajóbábony	10 / 18	45
1997–98	7	Sajóbábony	5 / 11	30
1998–99	7	Sajóbábony	1 / 9	38
1999–00	6	Sajóbábony	4 / 16	65
2000–01	6	Sajóbábony	3 / 16	63
2001–02	6	Sajóbábony	6 / 16	44
2002–03	6	Sajóbábony	10 / 16	37
2003–04	6	Sajóbábony	6 / 16	47
2004–05	6	Sajóbábony	1 / 16	66
2005–06	4	Sajóbábony	14 / 18	27
2006–07	4	Sajóbábony	16 / 18	33
2007–08	5	Sajóbábony VSE	1 / 16	76
2008–09	4	Sajóbábony	7 / 18	51
2009–10	4	Sajóbábonyi Vegyész SE	8 / 18	49
2010–11	4	Sajóbábonyi Vegyész SE	4 / 18	59
2011–12	4	Sajóbábonyi Vegyész SE	3 / 18	73
2012–13	4	Sajóbábony VSE	5 / 16	51
2013–14	4	Sajóbábonyi Vegyész SE	3 / 16	62
2014–15	4	Sajóbábonyi VSE	3 / 16	56
2015–16	4	Sajóbábonyi VSE	3 / 16	60
2016–17	4	Sajóbábonyi VSE	5 / 16	50
2017–18	4	Sajóbábonyi VSE	1 / 16	75
2018–19	3	Sajóbábonyi Vegyész SE	16 / 16	21
2019–20	4	Sajóbábonyi Vegyész SE	1 / 16	46
2020–21	3	Sajóbábonyi Vegyész SE	19 / 20	24
2021–22	4	Sajóbábonyi Vegyész SE	4 / 16	54
2022–23	4	Sajóbábonyi Vegyész SE	3 / 16	53
2023–24	4	Sajóbábonyi Vegyész SE	12 / 16	36
2024–25	4	Sajóbábonyi Vegyész SE	5 / 16	46
2025–26	4	Sajóbábonyi Vegyész SE	3 / 16	58
