= Eger SE =

Hungarian football club

- Full name: Eger Sportegyesület
- Founded: 2008; 18 years ago
- Ground: Szentmarjay Tibor Városi Stadion, Eger
- Capacity: 6,000
- Manager: Antal Simon
- League: NB III
- 2026–27: NB III, East, 5th
- Website: http://egerse.com/
Home colours	Away colours

Eger Sportegyesület or Eger Labdarúgó Sport Kft. is a professional football club, based in Heves County, Eger. The team currently plays in the third division, Nemzeti Bajnokság III. Eger SE is not the legal successor of FC Eger or Egri FC.

== History ==
In 2018, Eger SE won the 2017–18 Megyei Bajnokság I and were promoted to the third division.

On 5 July 2017, Ferenc Vígh was appointed as the manager of the club.

On 5 November 2018, the manager of the club, Ferenc Vígh, was fined by the Hungarian Football Federation. The fine was 100,000 Hungarian forints. The supporters of the club collected the sum to pay the fine instead of the manager.

On 8 March 2019, Ferenc Vígh was sacked because the Hungarian Football Federation banned him from every type of football-related activities.

On 2 July 2019, Zoltán Klink was appointed as the manager of the club. Klink previously worked as the trainer of Hungarian boxer, Zsolt Erdei. On 6 September 2019, Zoltán Klink was sacked. He managed the club in only five match in the third division. On 19 September 2019, Adrián Szekeres, manager of the club, was fired.

On 19 July 2022, Keve Mezey was signed by the club. Mezey is the grandson of former Hungary national team coach György Mezey.

In 2025, Milán Tóth, top scorer of the 2024–25 Nemzeti Bajnokság III season, was purchased by Videoton FC Fehérvár.

In the 2024–25 Nemzeti Bajnokság III season, Eger SE finished in the 8th position.

Eger SE finished in the 10th position in the 2025–26 Nemzeti Bajnokság III season.

On 1 June 2026, Antal Simon was sacked.

Eger SE lost six consecutive games in the 2026–27 Nemzeti Bajnokság III season.

== Honours ==
- Nemzeti Bajnokság III:
  - Winners (8): 2010–11

== Current squad ==
Note: Flags indicate national team as defined under FIFA eligibility rules; some limited exceptions apply. Players may hold more than one non-FIFA nationality.

No.	Pos.	Nation	Player
—	GK	HUN	Erik Bukrán
—	GK	HUN	Tamás Hámori
—	DF	HUN	Botond Hamar
—	DF	HUN	Balázs Lencsés
—	DF	HUN	Richárd Valkay
—	DF	HUN	Dávid Debreceni
—	DF	HUN	Dávid Hegedűs
—	MF	HUN	Levente Hegedűs
—	MF	HUN	Patrik Balázs

No.	Pos.	Nation	Player
—	MF	HUN	Máté Kis-Orosz
—	MF	HUN	Dávid Zvara
—	MF	HUN	Dániel Nagy-Kolozsvári
—	MF	HUN	Attila Bodnár
—	FW	HUN	Milán Tóth
—	FW	HUN	Gábor Farkas
—	FW	HUN	Attila Gíber
—	FW	HUN	Ernö Major
—	FW	HUN	Kornél Berecz

== Seasons ==
The table below shows the seasons of Eger SE.

Season	Tier	Club's name	Position	Pts
2008–09	6	Egri Sportcentrum SE	8 / 16	49
2009–10	6	Egri Sportcentrum SE	1 / 15	63
2010–11	6	Egri Sportcentrum SE	6 / 17	53
2011–12	6	Egri Sportcentrum SE	3 / 16	68
2012–13	6	Egri Sportcentrum SE	2 / 14	55
2013–14	6	Egri Sportcentrum SE	6 / 14	38
2014–15	5	Egri Sportcentrum SE	1 / 18	78
2015–16	4	Egri Sportcentrum SE	2 / 16	73
2016–17	4	Eger Labdarúgó Sport Kft.	2 / 15	73
2017–18	4	Eger SE	1 / 16	80
2018–19	3	Eger SE	10 / 16	36
2019–20	3	Eger SE	10 / 16	20
2020–21	3	Eger SE	6 / 20	66
2021–22	3	Eger SE	15 / 20	44
2022–23	3	Eger SE	18 / 20	44
2023–24	3	Eger SE	9 / 16	41
2024–25	3	Eger SE	8 / 16	38
2025–26	3	Eger SE	10 / 16	37

== Managers ==
- (Hungary) Ferenc Vígh (5 July 2019–8 March 2019)
- (Hungary) Zoltán Klink (2 July 2019 – 6 September 2019)
- (Hungary) Adrián Szekeres (19 September 2019)
- (Hungary) Antal Simon (1 June 2026)
