= Úrkút SK =

Hungarian football club

- Full name: Úrkút Sportkör
- Founded: 1928; 97 years ago
- Ground: Városi Sporttelep
| Home colours | Away colours |

Úrkút Sportkör is a professional football club based in Úrkút, Veszprém County, Hungary. The club competes in the Veszprém county league.

== Name changes ==
- 1928–?: Úrkúti Levente Egyesület
- ?-1949: Úrkúti Bányász Sport Egyesület
- 1949–1951: Úrkúti Tárna
- 1951–?: Úrkúti Bányász SK
- ?-1986: Úrkúti Bányász SC
- 1986: defunct
- 1993: reestablished
- 1993–present: Úrkúti Sportkör
