= Jamina SE =

Hungarian football club

- Full name: Jamina Sportegyesület
- Founded: 1945
- Ground: Jamina pálya
- Website: https://www.jaminase.hu/site/
Home colours

Jamina Sportegyesület is a professional football club based in Békéscsaba, Békés County, Hungary.

== Name changes ==
- Jamina Sportegyesület: 1945 - ?
- Erzsébethelyi MaDISz: ? - 1946
- 1946: merger with Békéscsabai MaDISz
- Békéscsabai Suk MaDISz: 1946 - 1948
- 1948: merger with Békéscsabai Bohn SC
- Békéscsabai Agyagipari Építők Sportklub: 1948 - 1957
- Békéscsaba-Erzsébethely SC: 1957 - 1957
- Békéscsabai Agyagipar Sportklub: 1957 - 1974
- 1975: merger with Békéscsabai VTSK
- Békéscsabai Tanács Agyagipar SK: 1975 - 1980
- Békéscsabai Agyagipar Sportklub: 1980 - 1990
- Békéscsabai Előre Favorit: 1990 - 1992
- Békéscsabai Jamina SE: 1992 - 2004
- Frühwald-Jamina SE: 2004 - 2005
- Erzsébethely SE: 2005 - 2006
- Frühwald-Jamina SE: 2006 - 2011
- Jamina SE: 2011 -

== Seasons ==
As of 18 October 2026.

Season	Tier	Club's name	Position	Pts
1945–46	3	Erzsébethelyi MaDISz	8 / 12	18
1946–47	4	Békéscsabai Suk MaDISz	1 / 12	
1947–48	3	SUK MaDISz (Békéscsaba)	9 / 16	30
1948–49	3	Békéscsabai Agyagipar SK	11 / 16	27
1949–50	3	Békéscsabai Agyagipar	15 / 16	20
1950	4	Békéscsabai Agyagipar	1 / 16	25
1951	3	Békéscsabai Agyagipar	4 / 12	29
1952	3	Békéscsabai Agyagipari Építők	4 / 14	30
1953	3	Békéscsabai Agyagipar	3 / 12	29
1954	3	Békéscsabai Agyagipar	6 / 14	26
1955	3	Békéscsabai Agyagipar	13 / 16	24
1956	3	Békéscsabai Agyagipar	13 / 16	21
1957	3	Békéscsaba-Erzsébethely SC	3 / 7	14
1957–58	3	Békéscsabai Agyagipar Építők	6 / 16	33
1958–59	3	Békéscsabai Agyagipar	14 / 16	25
1959–60	4	Békéscsabai Agyagipar	1 / 16	45
1960–61	3	Békéscsabai Agyagipar	15 / 16	17
1962–63	6	Békéscsabai Agyagipar	2 / 11	36
1963	7	Békéscsabai Agyagipar	1 / 11	15
1964	6	Békéscsabai Agyagipar	2 / 14	40
1965	6	Békéscsabai Agyagipar	3 / 16	47
1966	6	Békéscsabai Agyagipar	1 / 14	44
1967	5	Békéscsabai Agyagipar	3 / 16	38
1968	5	Békéscsabai Agyagipar SK	1 / 16	47
1969	4	Békéscsabai Agyagipar	2 / 16	37
1970	4	Békéscsabai Agyagipar	8 / 16	16
1970–71	4	Békéscsabai Agyagipar	7 / 16	35
1971–72	4	Békéscsabai Agyagipar	11 / 16	28
1972–73	4	Békéscsabai Agyagipar	5 / 16	35
1973–74	4	Békéscsabai Agyagipar	10 / 16	28
1974–75	3	Békéscsabai TASK	5 / 20	48
1975–76	3	Békéscsabai TASK	4 / 20	46
1976–77	3	Békéscsabai TASK	1 / 20	56
1977–78	2	Békéscsabai TASK	11 / 20	36
1978–79	2	Békéscsabai TASK	15 / 20	31
1979–80	2	Békéscsabai TASK	20 / 20	30
1980–81	3	Békéscsabai Agyagipar	4 / 18	45
1981–82	3	Békéscsabai Agyagipar	11 / 16	26
1982–83	4	Békéscsabai Agyagipar	11 / 16	26
1983–84	4	Békéscsabai Agyagipar SK	1 / 16	42
1984–85	3	Békéscsabai Agyagipar	16 / 16	9
1985–86	4	Békéscsabai Agyagipar	12 / 16	24
1986–87	4	Békéscsabai Agyagipar	11 / 16	25
1987–88	4	Békéscsabai Agyagipar	8 / 16	27
1988–89	4	Békéscsabai Agyagipar	14 / 16	33
1989–90	4	Békéscsabai Agyagipar	3 / 16	42
1990–91	4	Békéscsabai Favorit	6 / 16	31
1991–92	4	Békéscsabai Előre Favorit	9 / 16	31
1992–93	4	Békéscsabai Jamina	12 / 16	25
1993–94	4	Békéscsabai Jamina	6 / 16	33
1994–95	4	Jamina SE	3 / 16	51
1995–96	4	Békéscsabai Jamina PSE	3 / 16	55
1996–97	4	Jamina Patrick	2 / 18	78
1997–98	4	Jamina	13 / 16	30
1998–99	4	Jamina SE	10 / 16	38
1999–00	4	Jamina SE	11 / 16	36
2000	3	Jamina SE	8 / 8	4
2000–01	4	Jamina SE	10 / 11	15
2001–02	4	Jamina SE	12 / 13	11
2002–03	4	Jamina SE Békéscsaba	5 / 16	49
2003–04	4	Jamina SE	9 / 16	37
2004–05	4	Frühwald Jamina SE	11 / 14	30
2005–06	4	Erzsébethely SE	13 / 18	39
2006–07	4	Frühwald-Jamina SE	3 / 16	55
2007–08	4	Békéscsabai Jamina SE	4 / 16	52
2008–09	4	Frühwald-Jamina SE	5 / 16	49
2009–10	4	Frühwald-Jamina SE	13 / 16	29
2010–11	4	Frühwald-Jamina SE	9 / 15	35
2011–12	4	Jamina SE	8 / 16	48
2012–13	4	Jamina SE	7 / 16	37
2013–14	4	Jamina SE	11 / 16	30
2014–15	4	Jamina SE	11 / 16	36
2015–16	4	Jamina SE	9 / 15	37
2016–17	4	Jamina SE	9 / 13	27
2017–18	4	Jamina SE	8 / 12	30
2018–19	4	Jamina SE	9 / 11	26
2019–20	4	Jamina SE	8 / 8	9
2020–21	4	Jamina SE	3 / 8	29
2020–21	4	Jamina SE	6 / 12	33
2021–22	4	Jamina SE	7 / 12	56
2022–23	4	Jamina SE	9 / 10	5
2023–24	4	Jamina SE	10 / 10	13
2024–25	4	Jamina SE	5 / 12	39
2025–26	4	Jamina SE	5 / 11	36
