= Kecskéd KSK =

Hungarian football club

Kecskéd
- Full name: Kecskéd KSK
- Founded: 1947; 78 years ago
- Manager: László Linczmaier
- Website: kecskedksk.hu
Home colours

Kecskéd KSK is a football club based in Kecskéd, Komárom-Esztergom County, Hungary, that competes in the county championship, the fourth tier of Hungarian football.

== History ==
Kecskéd lost 10–0 to Kisvárda in the 2020–21 Magyar Kupa season.
