= Kecskeméti LC =

Hungarian football club

- Full name: Kecskeméti Labdarúgó Club
- Founded: 1992; 33 years ago
- Ground: Széktói Stadion
| Home colours | Away colours |

Kecskeméti Labdarúgó Club is a professional football club based in Kecskemét, Bács-Kiskun County, Hungary, that competes in the Bács-Kiskun county league.

== Name changes ==
- 1992–2017: Kecskeméti Labdarúgó Club
- 2017–2018: Kecskeméti Labdarúgó Club KTE SI
- 2018: Kecskeméti TE
- 2018: Kecskeméti Labdarúgó Club
