= 2020–21 Magyar Kupa =

Tournament details
- Country: Hungary
- Dates: 19 September 2020 – 3 May 2021
- Teams: 128 (Main round)

Final positions
- Champions: Újpest (11th title)
- Runners-up: Fehérvár

Tournament statistics
- Top goal scorer(s): (Croatia) Baturina, (Georgia (country)) Beridze, (Hungary) Prosser (6 goals each)

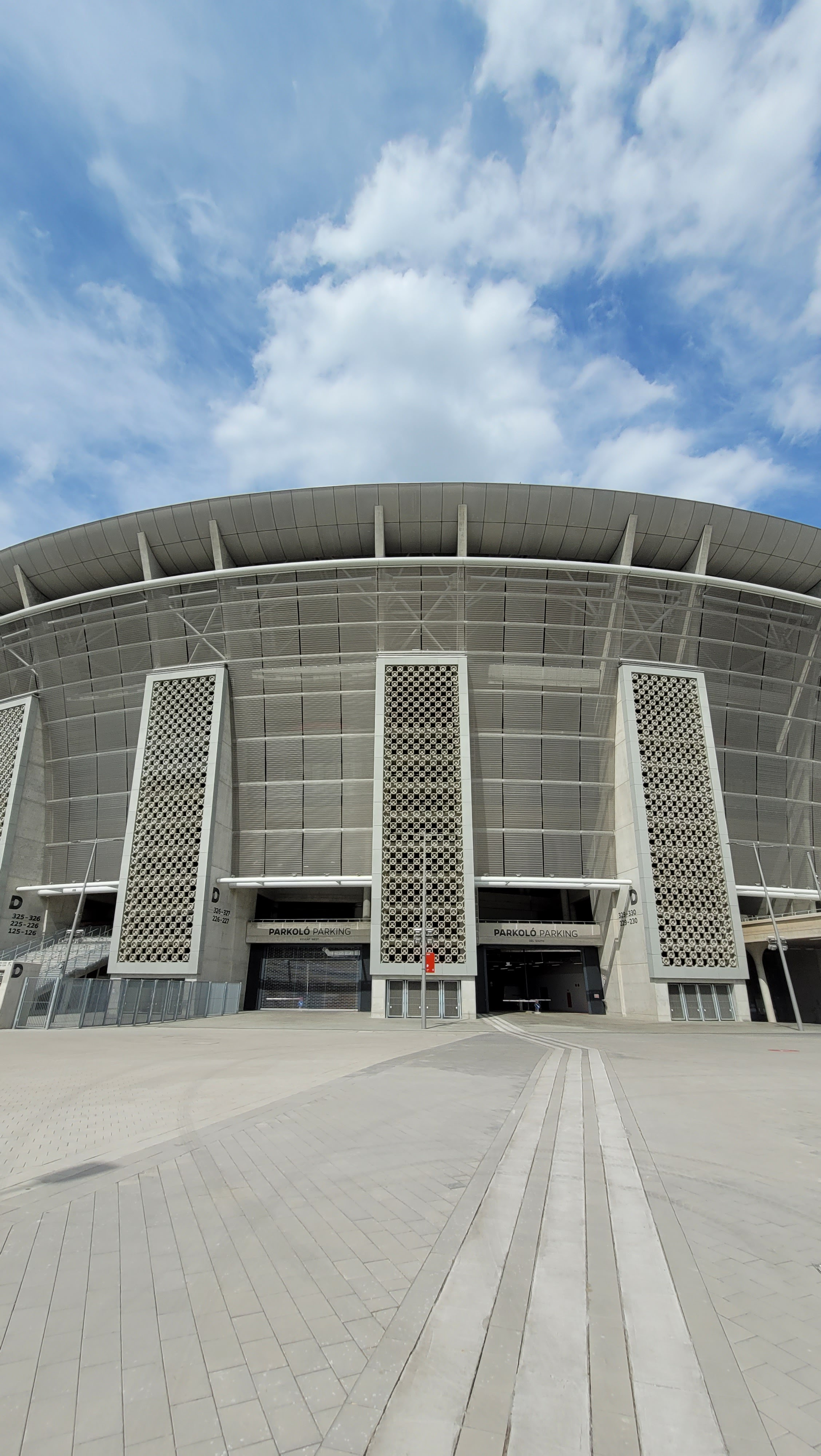
Puskas Arena, Budapest (2022)

The 2020–21 Magyar Kupa (English: Hungarian Cup) is the 81st season of Hungary's annual knock-out cup football competition. The title holders were Honvéd by winning the 2020 Magyar Kupa final.

== Main Tournament ==
| Tier | League | No | Teams |
|---|---|---|---|
| 1 | NBI | 12 | Budafok, Honvéd, Diósgyőr, Fehérvár, Ferencváros, Kisvárda, Mezőkövesd, MTK Budapest, Paks, Puskás Akadémia, Újpest, Zalaegerszeg |
| 2 | NBII | 20 | ^{1}Balmazújváros, Békéscsaba, Budaörs, Cegléd, Csákvár, Debreceni VSC, Debreceni EAC, Dorog, Gyirmót, Győr, Kaposvár, Kazincbarcika, Monor, Mosonmagyaróvár, Nyíregyháza, Pécs, Siófok, Soroksár, Szentlőrinc, Szombathely, Tiszakécske, Vác, Vasas |
| 3 | NBIII (West) | 16 | III. Kerület, Ajka, Andráshida, BKV Előre, Csepel, Dunaharaszt, Érd, Komárom, Ménfőcsanak, MOL Fehérvár FC II, Nagykanizsa, Pápa, Pénzügyőr, Puskás II, Sárvár, Szabadkikötő |
| 3 | NBIII (Centre) | 16 | Dabas, Dunaújváros, Honvéd II, Hódmezővásárhely, Iváncsa, Kecskemét, Kozármisleny, Makó, Paks II, Rákosmente, Szeged, Szekszárd, SZEOL, Taksony |
| 3 | NBIII (East) | 16 | Cigánd, Diósgyőr II, Eger, ESMTK, Füzesgyarmat, Gyöngyös, Jászberény, Nyírbátor, Putnok, Sajóbábony, Salgótarján, Sényő, Szolnok, Tiszaújváros, Tállya |
| 4 | MBI | 40 | TBA |

== Round of 128 ==
A total of 128 teams participated in the 6th round of the Magyar Kupa. The new entrants were 12 clubs from the 2020–21 Nemzeti Bajnokság I, 20 clubs from the 2020–21 Nemzeti Bajnokság II, and 48 from the 2020–21 Nemzeti Bajnokság III.

| 18 September 2020 6th round | Sopron (3) | 0–0 (4-5 p.) | Budapesti VSC (3) | Sopron |
| 20:00 CET | | Report | | Stadium: Káposztás utcai Stadion; Referee: Ákos Gaál |

| 19 September 2020 6th round | Ráckeve VAFC () | 1–6 | Ferencvárosi TC (1) | Ráckeve |
| 13:00 CET | Marković 86' | Report | 18' 52' Baturina; 32' Katona; 56' Zubkov; 81' Varga; 83' Škvarka | Stadium: Ráckevei sportpálya Referee: Ákos Gaál |

| 19 September 2020 6th round | Szarvaskend (c) | 1–10 | Csákvár (3) | Szarvaskend |
| 14:00 CET | | [ Report] |

| 19 September 2020 6th round | Zsámbéki SK (1) | 2–1 | THSE Szabadkikötő (3) | Zsámbék |
| 14:00 CET | | [ Report] |

| 19 September 2020 6th round | Sajóbábony (3) | 1–2 | Eger (3) | Sajóbábony |
| 14:00 CET | | [ Report] |

| 19 September 2020 6th round | Bonyhád (c) | 2–3 | Monor (3) | Bonyhád |
| 14:30 CET | | [ Report] |

| 19 September 2020 6th round | Makó (c) | 1–3 | Pécsi MFC (2) | Makó |
| 15:00 CET | | [ Report] |

| 19 September 2020 6th round | 43. sz Építők SE (c) | 0–8 | MTK Budapest (1) | Budapest |
| 15:00 CET | | [ Report] |

| 19 September 2020 6th round | Mohács (c) | 0–6 | Budafok (1) | Mohács |
| 15:00 CET | | [ Report] |

| 19 September 2020 6th round | Sárvár (3) | 0–3 | Kaposvár (2) | Sárvár |
| 15:00 CET | | [ Report] |

| 19 September 2020 6th round | Diósjenő SE (c) | 0–5 | Dorog (2) | Diósjenő |
| 15:00 CET | | [ Report] |

| 19 September 2020 6th round | Mezőkeresztes SE (c) | 0–11 | Zalaegerszeg (1) | Mezőkeresztes |
| 15:00 CET | | [ Report] |

| 19 September 2020 6th round | Balatonfüred (c) | 2–3 | Debreceni EAC (2) | Balatonfüred |
| 15:00 CET | | [ Report] |

| 19 September 2020 6th round | Szeghalmi FC (c) | postponed | Szolnok (1) | Szeghalom |
| 15:00 CET | | [ Report] |

| 19 September 2020 6th round | Jászberény (1) | 1–6 | Budaörs (2) | Jászberény |
| 15:00 CET | | [ Report] |

| 19 September 2020 6th round | Mosonmagyaróvár (3) | 0–1 | Siófok (2) | Mosonmagyaróvár |
| 15:00 CET | | [ Report] |

| 19 September 2020 6th round | Kecskéd (c) | 0–10 | Kisvárda (1) | Kecskéd |
| 15:00 CET | | [ Report] |

| 19 September 2020 6th round | Sárbogárd (c) | 0–3 | Kazincbarcika (3) | Sárbogárd |
| 15:00 CET | | [ Report] |

| 19 September 2020 6th round | BKV Előre (3) | 1–2 | Szentlőrinc (3) | Budapest |
| 15:00 CET | | [ Report] |

| 19 September 2020 6th round | Vác(3) | 1–4 | Békéscsaba (2) | Vác |
| 15:00 CET | | [ Report] |

| 19 September 2020 6th round | ASR Gázgyár (c) | 1–0 | Gesztely FC (c) |
| 15:00 CET | | [ Report] |

| 19 September 2020 6th round | Csorna (c) | 1–2 | Dabas–Gyón (3) | Csorna |
| 15:00 CET | | [ Report] |

| 19 September 2020 6th round | Dunavarsány (c) | 2–1 | Körösladány (3) | Dunavarsány |
| 15:00 CET | | [ Report] |

| 19 September 2020 6th round | Bodajk SE (c) | 0–3 | Érd (3) | Bodajk |
| 15:00 CET | | [ Report] |

| 19 September 2020 6th round | Király (c) | 2–3 | Bicskei TC (c) | Szombathely |
| 15:00 CET | | [ Report] |

| 19 September 2020 6th round | Bátaszék (c) | 8–1 | Fehérgyarmat SC (c) | Bátaszék |
| 15:00 CET | | [ Report] |

| 19 September 2020 6th round | Kabai Meteorit SE (c) | 1–1 (p. 3–2) | AC Nagybajom (c) | Kaba |
| 15:00 CET | | [ Report] |

| 19 September 2020 6th round | Kiskunfélegyházai HTK (c) | 1–0 | Majosi SE (c) | Kiskunfélegyháza |
| 15:00 CET | | [ Report] |

| 19 September 2020 6th round | Abda SC (c) | 0–1 | Hódmezővásárhely (3) | Abda |
| 15:00 CET | | [ Report] |

| 19 September 2020 6th round | Mezőtúri AFC (3) | 1–9 | Ménfőcsanak (3) | Mezőtúr |
| 15:00 CET | | [ Report] |

| 19 September 2020 6th round | Mátraterenye SE (c) | 0–3 | Cso-Ki Sport (c) | Mátraterenye |
| 15:00 CET | | [ Report] |

| 19 September 2020 6th round | Füzesgyarmat (3) | 1–2 | Gárdony (c) | Gárdony |
| 15:00 CET | | [ Report] |

| 19 September 2020 6th round | Tihanyi FC (c) | 0–5 | Kecskemét (3) | Tihany |
| 15:00 CET | | [ Report] |

| 19 September 2020 6th round | Mórahalom (c) | 0–3 | Gyöngyös (c) | Mórahalom |
| 15:00 CET | | [ Report] |

| 19 September 2020 6th round | BTE Felsőzsolca (c) | 4–1 | Gyula (3) | Felsőzsolca |
| 15:00 CET | | [ Report] |

| 19 September 2020 6th round | PTE PEAC (c) | 0–7 | Salgótarján() | Pécs |
| 15:00 CET | | [ Report] |

| 19 September 2020 6th round | Ajka Kristály SE (c) | 0–7 | Lipót (3) | Ajka |
| 15:00 CET | | [ Report] |

| 19 September 2020 6th round | Korármisleny (3) | 1–0 | Tatabánya (3) | Kozármisleny |
| 15:00 CET | | [ Report] |

| 19 September 2020 6th round | Tiszakécske (3) | 0–2 | Debreceni VSC (2) | Tiszakécske |
| 15:00 CET | | [ Report] |

| 19 September 2020 6th round | Pápa (3) | 2–6 | Győr (2) | Pápa |
| 15:00 CET | | [ Report] |

| 19 September 2020 6th round | Tiszaújváros (3) | 1–7 | Honvéd (1) | Tiszaújváros |
| 15:00 CET | | [ Report] |

| 19 September 2020 6th round | Csepel (3) | 0–3 | Soroksár (2) | Budapest |
| 15:00 CET | | [ Report] | | Stadium: Béke téri Stadion |

| 19 September 2020 6th round | Sényő (3) | 1–5 | Vasas (2) | Sényő |
| 15:00 CET | | [ Report] |

| 19 September 2020 6th round | Szeged (3) | 0–3 | Szombathelyi Haladás (2) | Szeged |
| 15:00 CET | | [ Report] | | Stadium: Szegedi VSE Stadion |

| 19 September 2020 6th round | Tiszaföldvári VSE (c) | 0–5 | Fehérvár (1) | Tiszaföldvár |
| 15:00 CET | | [ Report] |

| 19 September 2020 6th round | Kerekegyházi SE (c) | 1–8 | Gyirmót (2) | Kerekegyháza |
| 15:00 CET | | [ Report] |

| 19 September 2020 6th round | Maroshegy (c) | 0–5 | FC Ajka (2) | Székesfehérvár |
| 15:00 CET | | [ Report] |

| 19 September 2020 6th round | Mándok VSE (c) | 1–8 | Mezőkovesd (1) | Mándok |
| 15:00 CET | | [ Report] |

| 19 September 2020 6th round | Hatvan (c) | 1–3 | Paks (1) | Hatvan |
| 15:00 CET | | [ Report] |

| 19 September 2020 6th round | Tarpa SC (c) | 2–2 (p. 4–3) | Komárom (c) | Tarpa |
| 15:00 CET | | [ Report] |

| 19 September 2020 6th round | Cegléd (c) | 5–1 | Rákosmente (c) | Cegléd |
| 15:00 CET | | [ Report] |

| 19 September 2020 6th round | Dabas (3) | 0–3 | Dunaújváros (2) | Dabas, Hungary |
| 15:00 CET | | [ Report] |

| 19 September 2020 6th round | Teskánd KSE (c) | 1–3 | Taksony (c) | Teskánd |
| 15:00 CET | | [ Report] |

| 19 September 2020 6th round | ESMTK (c) | 1–3 | Tállya (3) | Budapest |
| 15:00 CET | | [ Report] |

| 19 September 2020 6th round | Balmazújváros (c) | 0–4 | III. Kerület (3) | Balmazújváros |
| 15:00 CET | | [ Report] |

| 19 September 2020 6th round | Zalaszentgróti VFC (c) | 1–0 | Nagyatád (c) | Zalaszentgrót |
| 15:00 CET | | [ Report] |

| 19 September 2020 6th round | Nemesapáti SE (c) | 2–1 | Szekszárd (c) | Nemesapáti |
| 15:00 CET | | [ Report] |

| 19 September 2020 6th round | Gyöngyöshalász SE (c) | 3–4 | Nagykanizsa () | Gyöngyöshalász |
| 15:00 CET | | [ Report] |

| 20 September 2020 6th round | Veszprém () | 0–5 | Szeged-Csanád Grosics Akadémia () | Veszprém |
| 14:00 CET | | [ Report] | | Stadium: Veszprémi Városi Stadion |

| 7 October 2020 6th round | Lőrinci VSC (c) | 0–7 | Nyíregyháza (2) | Lőrinci |
| 14:00 CET | | [ Report] | | Stadium: Lőrinci Sporttelep |

| 7 October 2020 6th round | Balassagyarmat (3) | 0–2 | Diósgyőr (1) | Balassagyarmat |
| 14:00 CET | | [ Report] | | Stadium: Balassagyarmati Ipolyparti Sporttelep |

| 7 October 2020 6th round | Iváncsa (c) | 0–4 | Újpest () | Iváncsa |
| 14:00 CET | | [ Report] | | Stadium: Iváncsa Sportpálya |

| 7 October 2020 6th round | Tiszafüred () | 3–2 | Putnok () | Tiszafüred |
| 15:00 CET | | [ Report] | | Stadium: Lipcsey Elemér Sporttelep |

| 7 October 2020 6th round | Szeghalmi FC () | 0–10 | Szolnok () | Szeghalom |
| 14:00 CET | | [ Report] |

| 10 October 2020 6th round | Toponár SE (c) | 0–7 | Puskás Akadémia (1) | Kaposvár |
| 15:00 CET | | [ Report] |

== Round of 64 ==
| 21 October 2020 32nd finals | Budaörs | 1–3 | Csákvár | Budaörs |
| 00:00 CET | | Report |

| 28 October 2020 32nd finals | Gárdony | 1–4 | Fehérvár | Gárdony |
| 00:00 CET | | Report |

| 28 October 2020 32nd finals | Nemesapáti | 0–2 | Honvéd | Nemesapáti |
| 00:00 CET | | [Report] |

| 28 October 2020 32nd finals | Lipót | 1–3 | Zalaegerszeg | Lipót |
| 00:00 CET | | [Report] |

| 28 October 2020 32nd finals | Dabas–Gyón | 2–3 | Budafok | Dabas |
| 00:00 CET | | [Report] |

| 28 October 2020 32nd finals | Szentlőrinc | 0–4 | Puskás Akadémia | Kozármisleny |
| 00:00 CET | | [Report] |

| 28 October 2020 7th round | Gyöngyös | 1–4 | Mezőkövesd | Gyöngyös |
| 00:00 CET | | [Report] |

| 28 October 2020 7th round | Bátaszéki SE | 1–7 | MTK Budapest | Bátaszék |
| 00:00 CET | | [Report] |

| 28 October 2020 7th round | III. Kerület | 2–1 | Szeged-Csanád Grosics Akadémia | Budapest |
| 00:00 CET | | [Report] |

| 28 October 2020 7th round | Zsámbéki SK | 1–3 | Tállya | Zsámbék |
| 00:00 CET | | [Report] |

| 28 October 2020 7th round | Zalaszentgróti VFC | 0–1 | Tiszafüred | Zalaszentgrót |
| 00:00 CET | | [Report] |

| 28 October 2020 7th round | Cegléd | 0–1 | Ajka | Cegléd |
| 00:00 CET | | [Report] |

| 28 October 2020 7th round | Kiskunfélegyházi HTK | 1–5 | Dorog | Kiskunfélegyháza |
| 00:00 CET | | [Report] |

| 28 October 2020 7th round | Érd | 0–3 | Kazincbarcika | Érd |
| 00:00 CET | | [Report] |

| 28 October 2020 7th round | Kabai Meteorit SE | 0–2 | Dunavarsány | Kaba |
| 00:00 CET | | [Report] |

| 28 October 2020 7th round | Salgótarján | 1–3 | Pécs | Salgótarján |
| 00:00 CET | | [Report] | | Stadium: Szojka Ferenc Stadion |

| 28 October 2020 7th round | Taksony | 2–0 | Kozármisleny | Dunaharaszti |
| 00:00 CET | | [Report] |

| 28 October 2020 7th round | Tarpa SC | 4–1 | Felsőzsolca | Tarpa |
| 00:00 CET | | [Report] |

| 28 October 2020 7th round | Budapesti VSC | 0–2 | Debrecen | Budapest |
| 00:00 CET | | [Report] | | Stadium: Szőnyi úti Stadion |

| 28 October 2020 7th round | Eger | 0–2 | Vasas | Eger |
| 00:00 CET | | [Report] | | Stadium: Szentmarjay Tibor Városi Stadion |

| 28 October 2020 7th round | Nagykanizsa | 1–2 | Debreceni EAC | Nagykanizsa |
| 00:00 CET | | [Report] |

| 28 October 2020 7th round | Monori SE | 2–2 | Siófok | Monor |
| 00:00 CET | | [Report] |

| 28 October 2020 7th round | Cso-Ki Sport | 0–1 | Hódmezővásárhely | Csomád |
| 00:00 CET | | [Report] |

| 28 October 2020 7th round | Soroksár | 3–2 | Győr | Budapest |
| 00:00 CET | | [Report] | | Stadium: Szamosi Mihály Sporttelep |

| 28 October 2020 7th round | ASR Gázgyár | 1–5 | Kaposvár |
| 00:00 CET | | [Report] |

| 28 October 2020 7th round | Kecskemét | 0–1 | Kisvárda | Kecskemét |
| 00:00 CET | | [Report] | | Stadium: Széktói Stadion |

| 28 October 2020 7th round | Dunaújváros | 0–6 | Újpest | Eszperantó úti Stadion |
| 00:00 CET | | [Report] | | Attendance: Dunaújváros |

| 29 October 2020 7th round | Nyíregyháza | 1–2 | Paks | Nyíregyháza |
| 00:00 CET | | [Report] |

| 29 October 2020 7th round | Békéscsaba | 0–3 | Diósgyőr | Békéscsaba |
| 00:00 CET | | [Report] | | Stadium: Kórház utcai Stadion |

| 11 November 2020 7th round | Ménfőcsanak | 0–3 | Szombathelyi Haladás | Győr |
| 00:00 CET | | [Report] |

| 13 November 2020 7th round | Szolnok | 1–0 | Gyírmót | Szolnok |
| 00:00 CET | | [Report] | | Stadium: Tiszaligeti Stadion |

| 14 November 2020 7th round | Bicske | 0–5 | Ferencváros | Bicske |
| 00:00 CET | | Report | 17' 59' 72' Baturina; 62' Boli; 91' Škvarka | Stadium: Bicskei Sporttelep; Referee: Gábor Oláh |

== Round of 32 ==
| 10 February 2021 16th finals | Tarpa SC | 0–3 | Diósgyőr | Tarpa |
| 00:00 CET | | Report] |

| 10 February 2021 16th finals | Szolnok | 0–2 | Újpest | Szolnok |
| 00:00 CET | | Report] | | Stadium: Tiszaligeti Stadion |

| 10 February 2021 16th finals | Dorog | 1–2 | Ferencváros | Dorog |
| 00:00 CET | | Report] | | Stadium: Buzánszky Jenő Stadion |

| 10 February 2021 16th finals | III. Kerület | 1–3 | Honvéd | Budapest |
| 00:00 CET | | Report] |

| 10 February 2021 16th finals | Csákvár | 2–3 | Paks | Csákvár |
| 00:00 CET | | Report] |

| 10 February 2021 16th finals | Hódmezővásárhely | 0–3 | Puskás Akadémia | Hódmezővásárhely |
| 00:00 CET | | Report] |

| 10 February 2021 16th finals | Soroksár | 1–2 | Kisvárda | Budapest |
| 00:00 CET | | Report] |

| 10 February 2021 16th finals | Kazincbarcika | 1–4 | MTK Budapest | Kazincbarcika |
| 00:00 CET | | Report] | | Stadium: Pete András Stadion |

| 10 February 2021 16th finals | Dunavarsány | 0–11 | Budafok | Dunavarsány |
| 00:00 CET | | Report] |

| 10 February 2021 16th finals | Tállya | 5–3 | Kaposvár | Tállya |
| 00:00 CET | | Report] |

| 10 February 2021 16th finals | Taksony | 1–4 | Siófok | Dunaharaszti |
| 00:00 CET | | Report] |

| 10 February 2021 16th finals | Debreceni EAC | 1–2 | Debrecen | Debrecen |
| 00:00 CET | | Report] | | Stadium: Nagyerdei Stadion |

| 10 February 2021 16th finals | Pécs | 0–1 | Szombathelyi Haladás | Pécs |
| 00:00 CET | | Report] | | Stadium: Stadion PMFC |

| 10 February 2021 16th finals | Ajka | 1–2 | Mezőkövesd | Ajka |
| 00:00 CET | | Report] |

| 10 February 2021 16th finals | Vasas | 1–2 | Fehérvár | Budapest |
| 00:00 CET | | Report] | | Stadium: Illovszky Rudolf Stadion |

| 10 February 2021 16th finals | Tiszafüred | 1–2 | Zalaegerszeg | Tiszafüred |
| 00:00 CET | | Report] | | Stadium: Lipcsey Elemér Sporttelep |

== Round of 16 ==
| 23 February 2021 8th finals | Mezőkövesd | 2–0 | Diósgyőr | Mezőkövesd |
| 00:00 CET | | Report] | | Stadium: Mezőkövesdi Városi Stadion; Attendance: 0 |

| 24 February 2021 8th finals | Paks | 2–4 | Budafok | Paks |
| 13:00 CET | | Report] | | Stadium: Fehérvári úti Stadion; Attendance: 0 |

| 24 February 2021 8th finals | Tállya | 1–4 | MTK Budapest | Tállya |
| 13:00 CET | | Report] | | Attendance: 0 |

| 24 February 2021 8th finals | Zalaegerszeg | 2–1 | Honvéd | Zalaegerszeg |
| 14:00 CET | | Report] | | Stadium: ZTE Arena; Attendance: 0 |

| 24 February 2021 8th finals | Puskás Akadémia | 1–2 | Újpest | Felcsút |
| 16:00 CET | | Report] | | Stadium: Pancho Aréna; Attendance: 0 |

| 24 February 2021 8th finals | Debrecen | 2–1 (aet.) | Siófok | Debrecen |
| 16:00 CET | | Report] | | Stadium: Nagyerdei Stadion; Attendance: 0 |

| 24 February 2021 8th finals | Szombathelyi Haladás | 0–1 | Kisvárda | Szombathely |
| 17:00 CET | | Report] | | Stadium: Haladás Sportkomplexum; Attendance: 0 |

| 24 February 2021 8th finals | Ferencváros | 1–2 | Fehérvár | Budapest |
| 17:30 CET | | Report] | | Stadium: Groupama Arena; Attendance: 0 |

== Quarter-finals ==
| 9 March 2021 Quarter-finals | Újpest | 1–1 (5–4 p) | Mezőkövesd | Budapest |
| 17:30 CET | Perošević 73' | Report | Vadnai 32' | Stadium: Szusza Ferenc Stadion; Attendance: 0 |

| 10 March 2021 Quarter-finals | Fehérvár | 2–0 | Budafok | Székesfehérvár |
| 14:30 CET | Romić 68' (o.g.); Stopira 78' | Report | | Stadium: MOL Aréna Sóstó; Attendance: 0 |

| 10 March 2021 Quarter-finals | Kisvárda | 6–1 | Zalaegerszeg | Kisvárda |
| 15:00 CET | Gólok Ćirković 15'; Karabelyov 21'; Camaj 54' 74' Fernando Viana 59'; Kovácsréti 89' | Report | 78' László Papp | Stadium: Várkerti Stadion; Attendance: 0 |

| 10 March 2021 Quarter-finals | Debrecen | 1–2 | MTK Budapest | Debrecen |
| 17:30 CET | Szécsi 46' | Report | 42' Herrera; 50' Varga | Stadium: Nagyerdei Stadion; Attendance: 0 |

== Semi-finals ==
On 10 March 2021, the draw took place.

| 15 April 2021 Semi-finals | MTK Budapest | 1–2 | Fehérvár | Budapest |
| 18:30 CEST | Schön 14' | Report | 38' Bolla; 52' Nikolić | Stadium: Hidegkuti Nándor Stadion; Attendance: 0 Referee: Farkas Ádám |

| 14 April 2021 Semi-finals | Kisvárda | 0–1 | Újpest | Kisvárda |
| 17:30 CEST | | Report | 54' Beridze | Stadium: Várkerti Stadion; Attendance: 0 Referee: Bogár Gergő |

== Final ==
| 3 May 2021 Final | Fehérvár | 0–1 (a.e.t.) | Újpest | Budapest |
| 20:00 CEST | | Report | Kastrati 101' | Stadium: Puskás Aréna; Referee: Gergő Bogár |

== See also ==
- 2020–21 Nemzeti Bajnokság I
- 2020–21 Nemzeti Bajnokság II
- 2020–21 Nemzeti Bajnokság III
