= 2023–24 Magyar Kupa =

MOL Magyar Kupa

Tournament details
- Country: Hungary
- Dates: 5 August 2023 – 15 May 2024
- Teams: 166

Final positions
- Champions: Paks (1st title)
- Runners-up: Ferencváros

The 2023–24 Magyar Kupa (lit. 'Hungarian Cup') was the 84th season of Hungary's annual knock-out cup football competition. MOL was the sponsor of the tournament, thus the sponsored name is MOL Magyar Kupa. The winners qualified for the 2024–25 UEFA Europa League first qualifying round.

Paks won the cup on 15 May 2024 (their first Magyar Kupa win), defeating Ferecváros 2–0 in the final.

== Format ==
The tournament was played as a knockout tournament. All rounds were played as one-off matches. The final was traditionally held in the Puskás Aréna, Budapest.

== Calendar ==
Round	Main date(s)	Fixtures	Clubs	New entries	Leagues entering
First round	5–6, 9 August 2023	68	136 → 68	136	Nemzeti Bajnokság III and, Local teams (MB I, MB II)
Second round	26–27 August 2023	34	68 → 34	none	none
Round of 64 (Third round)	16–17 September 2023	32	64 → 32	30	Nemzeti Bajnokság I and, Nemzeti Bajnokság II
Round of 32 (Fourth round)	31 October–2 November 2023	16	32 → 16	none	none
Round of 16 (Fifth round)	27–29 February 2024	8	16 → 8	none	none
Quarter-finals (Sixth round)	2–4 April 2024	4	8 → 4	none	none
Semi-finals (Seventh round)	23–24 April 2024	2	4 → 2	none	none
Final (Eighth round)	15 May 2024	1	2 → 1	none	none

== Teams ==
A total of 166 teams competed in the 2023–24 edition, comprising 12 teams from the Nemzeti Bajnokság I (tier 1), 18 teams from the Nemzeti Bajnokság II (tier 2), 42 teams from the Nemzeti Bajnokság III (tier 3), 80 teams from the Megyei Bajnokság I (tier 4) and 14 teams from the Megyei Bajnokság II (tier 5).

=== Nemzeti Bajnokság I ===
- Debreceni VSC
- Diósgyőr
- Fehérvár
- Ferencváros
- Kecskemét
- Mezőkövesd
- Kisvárda
- MTK Budapest
- Puskás Akadémia
- Paks
- Újpest
- Zalaegerszeg

=== Nemzeti Bajnokság II ===
- Ajka
- Budafok
- Budapest Honvéd
- BVSC-Zugló
- Csákvár
- Gyirmót
- Győr
- Kazincbarcika
- Kozármisleny
- Mosonmagyaróvár
- Nyíregyháza
- Pécs
- Siófok
- Soroksár
- Szeged-Csanád
- Szombathelyi Haladás
- Tiszakécske
- Vasas

=== Nemzeti Bajnokság III ===
Northwest Group

- III. Kerület
- Balatonfüred
- Bicske
- Budaörs
- Csorna
- Dorog
- Haladás VSE
- Komárom
- Tatabánya
- Veszprém

Southwest Group

- Dunaföldvár
- Dunaújváros
- Érd
- Iváncsa
- Kaposvár
- Kelen
- Majos
- Nagykanizsa
- PTE-PEAC
- Szekszárd
- Szentlőrinc

Northeast Group

- Cigánd
- Debreceni EAC
- Eger
- Hatvan
- Karcag
- Putnok
- Rákospalota
- Sényő
- Tiszafüred
- Tiszaújváros

Southeast Group

- Békéscsaba
- BKV Előre
- Cegléd
- ESMTK Budapest
- Füzesgyarmat
- Dabas
- Hódmezővásárhely
- Körösladány
- Monor
- Pénzügyőr
- Szolnok

=== Megyei Bajnokság I ===
Baranya

- Bóly
- Lovászhetény-Pécsvárad
- Siklós

Bács-Kiskun

- Baja
- Harta
- Kecel
- Kecskeméti LC

Békés

- Orosházi MTK-ULE
- Szarvas

Borsod-Abaúj-Zemplén

- Felsőzsolca
- Hidasnémeti
- Gesztely

Budapest

- Csepel
- Csepeli UFC
- XV. Kerületi-Issimo
- Pestszentimre
- Unione

Csongrád-Csanád

- Algyő
- Makó
- Szegedi VSE
- SZEOL
- Tiszasziget

Fejér

- Csór
- Ikarus-Maroshegy
- Lajoskomárom
- Mór
- Sárbogárd

Győr-Moson-Sopron

- DAC-Nádorváros
- Mezőörs

Hajdú-Bihar

- Balmazújváros
- Hajdúsámson
- Hajdúszoboszló
- Monostorpályi
- Sárrét

Heves

- Energia Gyöngyös
- Lőrinci
- Maklár

Jász-Nagykun-Szolnok

- Jászberény
- Jászfényszaru
- Kisújszállás
- Tiszaföldvár

Komárom-Esztergom

- Esztergom
- Lábatlan
- Tatai AC
- Tát

Nógrád

- Balassagyarmat
- Bánk-Dalnoki Akadémia
- Berkenye
- Karancslapujtő

Pest

- Dunaharaszti
- Dunavarsány
- Felsőpakony
- Gödöllő
- Perbál
- Pilis
- Zsámbék

Somogy

- Kadarkút
- Marcali
- Nagyatád
- Nagybajom
- Toponár

Szabolcs-Szatmár-Bereg

- Nagyecsed
- Tarpa
- Újfehértó

Tolna

- Bátaszék
- Dombóvár

Vas

- Celldömölk
- Király SZE
- Rábapaty
- Vép

Veszprém

- Balatonalmádi
- Balatonfüredi USC
- Fűzfői AK
- Pápai PFC
- Úrkút

Zala

- Andráshida
- Csesztreg
- Múrakeresztúr
- Szepetnek
- Teskánd
- Zalaszentgrót

=== Megyei Bajnokság II ===
Baranya

- Ócsárd

Bács-Kiskun

- Apostag

Békés

- Mezőmegyer

Borsod-Abaúj-Zemplén

- Mezőcsát

Budapest

- Nimród

Fejér

- Baracs

Győr-Moson-Sopron

- Ásványráró
- Bőny
- Kajárpéc
- Rábaszentandrás

Nógrád

- Mátraterenye

Szabolcs-Szatmár-Bereg

- Biri
- Csengersima
- Gyulaháza

== Matches ==
Times up to 28 October 2023 and from 31 March 2024 are CEST (UTC+2). Times from 29 October 2023 to 30 March 2024 are CET (UTC+1).

=== First round ===
Teams in Tier 3 and below entered the first round.

Number of teams per tier entering this round
Nemzeti Bajnokság I (1) (Note: Nemzeti Bajnokság I and Nemzeti Bajnokság II teams joined the competition in round of 64.)	Nemzeti Bajnokság II (2)	Nemzeti Bajnokság III (3)	Megyei Bajnokság I (4)	Megyei Bajnokság II (5)	Total
12 / 12	18 / 18	42 / 42	80 / 80	14 / 14	166 / 166

Team 1	Score	Team 2
5 August 2023
Mezőcsát	0–2	BKV Előre
Berkenye	2–11	Sényő
Csep-Gól	8–0	Toponár
Gyöngyös	1–4	Tiszaújváros
Algyő	2–1	Füzesgyarmat
Andráshida	4–0	Esztergom
Apostag	0–5	Makó
Baja	2–1	XV. Kerületi-Issimo
Balassagyarmat	0–4	Hajdúsámson
Balatonfüredi USC	4–1	Rábapaty
Baracs	0–3	Nagyatád
Bátaszék	0–2	PTE-PEAC
Biri	1–3	Gesztely
Csengersima	0–6	Cigánd
Dunaharaszt	6–0	Sárrét
Felsőpakony	3–4	III. Kerület
Felsőzsolca	1–2	Tiszafüred
Fűzfői AK	3–2	Lajoskomárom
Harta	1–3	ESMTK Budapest
Jászberény	0–3	Hatvan
Jászfényszaru	1–3	Gödöllő
Ócsárd	0–8	Dunaföldvár
Kadarkút	1–2	Majos
Kaposvári Rákóczi	1–0	Dunaújváros
Kecel	1–7	Szarvas
Kecskeméti LC	5–0	SZEOL
Kisújszállás	1–5	Kelen
Labatlan	5–0	DAC-Nadorváros
Lőrinci	6–1	Bánk-Dalnoki Akadémia
Maklár	3–1	Karancslapujtő
Marcali	1–5	Szentlőrinc
Monostorpályi	0–2	Debreceni EAC
Nagybajom	2–1	Siklós
Nagyecsed	4–1	Hajdúszoboszló
Pápai PFC	4–0	DG Tát
Pécsvárad	5–1	Murakeresztúr
Sárbogárd	2–1	Dombóvár
Szegedi VSE	0–4	Szolnok
Szepetnek	1–2	Érd
Tarpa	4–0	Balmazújváros
Teskánd	1–2	Csorna
Tiszaföldvár	1–2	Békéscsaba
Tiszasziget	0–3	Körösladány
Pestszentimre	2–3	Dabas
Celldömölk	0–2	Veszprém
Csepel	2–1	Csór
6 August 2023
Ásványráró	1–3	Zsámbék
Balatonalmádi	0–3	Tatabánya
Balatonfüred	2–5	Budaörs
Bóly	2–1	Szekszárd
Bőny	1–6	Mezőörs
Gyulaháza	0–7	Eger
Maroshegy	2–7	Nagykanizsa
Mátraterenye	1–16	Putnok
Mezőmegyer	3–1	Dunavarsány
Monor	3–1	Karcag
Mór	0–3	Dorog
OMTK-ULE	5–0	Cegléd
Pénzügyőr	2–0	Iváncsa
Perbál	6–2	Tatai AC
Pilisi	2–1	Hódmezővásárhely
Rábaszentandrás	0–2	Bicske
Újfehértó	1–2 (a.e.t.)	Hidasnémeti
Úrkút	2–1	Zalaszentgrót
Vép	3–3 (a.e.t.) (5–3 p)	Király
Nimród	1–5	Unione
9 August 2023
Csesztreg	2–3	Haladás VSE
Kajarpéc	0–8	Komárom

=== Second round ===
The 68 first round winners entered the second round.

Number of teams per tier entering this round
Nemzeti Bajnokság I (1)	Nemzeti Bajnokság II (2)	Nemzeti Bajnokság III (3)	Megyei Bajnokság I (4)	Megyei Bajnokság II (5)	Total
12 / 12	18 / 18	36 / 42	31 / 80	1 / 14	98 / 166

Team 1	Score	Team 2
26 August 2023
Unione	3–1	Érd
Algyő	0–1	Pilis
Haladás VSE	2–1	Csorna
Baja	4–3	Dabas
Balatonfüredi USC	0–6	Dorog
Békéscsaba	3–1	Monor
Csep-Gól	1–2	Szentlőrinc
Debreceni EAC	4–0	Hatvan
Fűzfői AK	1–6	Veszprém
Lőrinci	0–4	Cigánd
Majos	2–0	Pénzügyőr
Makó	0–12	Dunaharaszti
Nagyecsed	2–1	Maklár
Pápai PFC	0–4	Bicske
Pécsvárad	0–3	PTE-PEAC
Putnok	3–1	Sényő
Sárbogárd	0–1	Kaposvári Rákóczi
Szarvas	1–5	ESMTK Budapest
Szolnok	1–4	Kelen
Tarpa	0–0 (a.e.t.) (0–3 p)	Eger
Tiszaújváros	2–1	Tiszafüred
Zsámbék	3–0	Úrkút
Csepel	5–1	Nagybajom
27 August 2023
Gesztely	5–0	Hajdusámson
Nagyatád	0–7	Dunaföldvár
Perbál	2–3	Komárom
Andráshida	0–4	Tatabánya
Bóly	1–5	Nagykanizsa
Hidasnémeti	0–3	Gödöllő
Kecskeméti LC	0–8	Körösladány
Lábatlan	0–11	Budaörs
Mezőmegyer	1–3	BKV Előre
Mezőörs	5–0	Vép
Orosházi MTK-ULE	0–1	III. Kerület

=== Round of 64 ===
The 34 second round winners, the 12 teams in Tier 1, and the 18 teams in Tier 2 entered the Round of 64.

Number of teams per tier entering this round
Nemzeti Bajnokság I (1)	Nemzeti Bajnokság II (2)	Nemzeti Bajnokság III (3)	Megyei Bajnokság I (4)	Total
12 / 12	18 / 18	23 / 42	11 / 80	64 / 166

Team 1	Score	Team 2
15 September 2023
Soroksár	1–2	Kecskeméti TE
16 September 2023
Nagyecsed	0–8	Ferencváros
Tatabánya	2–1	Haladás VSE
Baja	0–7	Szeged-Csanád
Budaörs	1–2	Siófok
Cigánd	0–4	Zalaegerszeg
Debreceni EAC	1–2	Kozármisleny
Dorog	2–4	Budapest Honvéd
Dunaharaszti	0–1	Vasas
Eger	1–2	Debreceni VSC
BKV Előre	0–7	Paks
ESMTK Budapest	1–0	Fehérvár
Gödöllő	1–2 (a.e.t.)	Dunaföldvár
Mezőörs	1–0	Nagykanizsa
Mosonmagyaróvár	0–2	Puskás Akadémia
Putnok	0–1	Budafok
Unione	1–0	Csepel
Veszprém	4–2 (a.e.t.)	Komárom
Bicske	0–3	Tiszakécske
Pécs	1–3	Újpest
Ajka	1–0	Mezőkövesd
Békéscsaba	0–2	Kazincbarcika
Csákvár	1–3	Szombathelyi Haladás
17 September 2023
Gesztely	1–6	MTK Budapest
III. Kerület	2–6	Diósgyőr
Kelen	1–0	Majos
Körösladány	0–0 (a.e.t.) (0–3 p)	Gyirmót
Pilis	0–5	Kisvárda
PTE-PEAC	0–2	Kaposvári Rákóczi
Szentlőrinc	1–0 (a.e.t.)	BVSC-Zugló
Tiszaújváros	1–1 (a.e.t.) (3–5 p)	Nyíregyháza
Zsámbék	0–2	Győr

=== Round of 32 ===
The 32 Round of 64 winners entered the Round of 32.

Number of teams per tier entering this round
Nemzeti Bajnokság I (1)	Nemzeti Bajnokság II (2)	Nemzeti Bajnokság III (3)	Megyei Bajnokság I (4)	Total
10 / 12	13 / 18	7 / 42	2 / 80	32 / 166

31 October 2023	Győr (2)	0–1	(1) Debreceni VSC	Győr
19:30		Report	Bárány 85'	Stadium: ETO Park; Attendance: 2,873; Referee: József Erdős

1 November 2023	Unione (4)	0–6	(1) Kisvárda	Budapest
12:00		Report	Nikolov 13'; Vida 30', 45', 53'; Melnyk 87'; Camaj 90'	Stadium: Hévízi úti Stadion; Attendance: 200; Referee: Tamás Sipos

1 November 2023	Dunaföldvár (3)	0–1	(2) Nyíregyháza	Dunaföldvár
12:30		Report	Géresi 62'	Stadium: Sporttelep; Referee: Tamás Nazsa

1 November 2023	ESMTK Budapest (3)	0–4	(1) MTK Budapest	Budapest
12:30		Report	Antonov 33'; Stieber 35'; Zsóri 65'; P. Kovács I 93'	Stadium: ESMTK Stadion; Attendance: 1,000; Referee: Márton Rúsz

1 November 2023	Mezőörs (4)	1–1 (5–3 p)	(3) Kaposvár	Mezőörs
12:30	Venczel 73'	Report	Szederkényi 10'	Stadium: Sporttelep; Referee: Ákos Gaál

1 November 2023	Szentlőrinc (3)	3–0	(3) Kelen	Szentlőrinc
12:30	Novák 55'; Múcska 83'; Keresztes 90'	Report		Stadium: Sporttelep; Referee: Attila Molnár

1 November 2023	Veszprém (3)	3–2	(2) Budafok	Pápa
12:30	Major 59'; Batrusz 62', 80'	Report	Dobsa 37' (o.g.); Kovács 72'	Stadium: Perutz Stadion; Attendance: 400; Referee: Tamás Móri

1 November 2023	Kozármisleny (2)	4–2	(2) Kazincbarcika	Kozármisleny
12:30	Tóth 26'; Horváth 73', 75'; Turi 83'	Report	Pekár 72'; Kártik 79'	Stadium: Kozármislenyi Stadion; Attendance: 700; Referee: Gergely Bana

1 November 2023	Tatabánya (3)	0–2	(1) Újpest	Tatabánya
17:00		Report	Jürgens 54'; Simon 62'	Stadium: Grosics Gyula Stadion; Attendance: 2,200; Referee: Imre Kovács

1 November 2023	Vasas (2)	3–1	(2) Gyirmót	Budapest
17:00	Zimonyi 52'; Berecz 86'; Novothny 86' (pen.)	Report	Pethő 54' (pen.)	Stadium: Illovszky Rudolf Stadion; Attendance: 1,090; Referee: Mihály Káprály

1 November 2023	Tiszakécske (2)	1–0	(2) Ajka	Tiszakécske
17:00	Zamostny 6'	Report		Stadium: Városi Sportcentrum; Attendance: 300; Referee: László Lovas

1 November 2023	Siófok (2)	1–3	(1) Diósgyőr	Siófok
17:00	Schildkraut 51'	Report	Klimovich 11'; Edomwonyi 45'; Bényei 88'	Stadium: Révész Géza utcai Stadion; Attendance: 600; Referee: Marcell Derdák

1 November 2023	Szombathelyi Haladás (2)	1–2	(1) Zalaegerszeg	Szombathely
17:15	R. Horváth 26'	Report	Croizet 16'; Ubochioma 21'	Stadium: Haladás Sportkomplexum; Attendance: 6,786; Referee: Gergő Bogár

1 November 2023	Szeged-Csanád (2)	0–1	(1) Kecskemét	Szeged
19:00		Report	Iyinbor 45'	Stadium: Szent Gellért Fórum; Attendance: 3,183; Referee: Bence Hanyecz

1 November 2023	Ferencváros (1)	4–3 (a.e.t.)	(1) Puskás Akadémia	Budapest
20:00	Ćivić 35'; Aaneba 50'; Traoré 114'; Abu Fani 130+1' (pen.)	Report	Gruber 9', 57'; Favorov 120'	Stadium: Grupama Aréna; Attendance: 7,057; Referee: Balázs Berke

2 November 2023	Budapest Honvéd (2)	2–2 (a.e.t.) (4–5 p)	(1) Paks	Budapest
20:00	Szappanos 22' (o.g.); Bobál 95'	Report	Könyves 19'; Hahn 88'	Stadium: Bozsik Aréna; Attendance: 2,200; Referee: Ádám Pillók

=== Round of 16 ===
The 16 Round of 32 winners entered the Round of 16.

Number of teams per tier entering this round
Nemzeti Bajnokság I (1)	Nemzeti Bajnokság II (2)	Nemzeti Bajnokság III (3)	Megyei Bajnokság I (4)	Total
9 / 12	4 / 18	2 / 42	1 / 80	16 / 166

27 February 2024	Diósgyőr (1)	4–2	(1) Zalaegerszeg	Miskolc
17:30	Gera 8'; Požeg Vancaš 13'; Szabó 45+3'; Edomwonyi 76'	Report	Sajbán 54'; Croizet 83' (pen.)	Stadium: Diósgyőri Stadion; Attendance: 3,456; Referee: Péter Zierkelbach

28 February 2024	Mezőörs (4)	1–1 (a.e.t.) (4–5 p)	(2) Vasas	Mezőörs
13:00	Végh 81'	Report	Berecz 57'	Stadium: Sporttelep; Attendance: 1,000; Referee: Ádám Pillók
	Penalties
	Vári (penalty scored); Simigla (penalty scored); Kerékgyártó (penalty missed); Venczel (penalty scored); Böröczky (penalty scored)		(penalty scored) Urblík; (penalty scored) Vida; (penalty scored) Berecz; (penalty scored) Zimonyi; (penalty scored) Radó

28 February 2024	Kozármisleny (2)	0–3	(1) MTK Budapest	Kozármisleny
17:00		Report	Jurina 9', 35'; Antonov 48'	Stadium: Kozármislenyi Stadion; Attendance: 800; Referee: Gergely Bana

28 February 2024	Veszprém (3)	0–2	(1) Kecskemét	Ajka
17:00		Report	Zsótér 59'; Katona 90+3'	Stadium: Városi Stadion; Attendance: 1,500; Referee: Zoltán Kovács J.

28 February 2024	Tiszakécske (2)	0–3	(1) Kisvárda	Tiszakécske
18:00		Report	Makowski 56', 58'; Ilievski 67'	Stadium: Városi Sportcentrum; Attendance: 400; Referee: Márió Zimmermann

28 February 2024	Debreceni VSC (1)	1–1 (a.e.t.) (3–5 p)	(1) Ferencváros	Debrecen
19:00	Bárány 81'	Report	Pešić 45+3' (pen.)	Stadium: Nagyerdei Stadion; Attendance: 10,371; Referee: Ferenc Karakó
	Penalties
	Bódi (penalty scored); Kocsis (penalty missed); Szuhodovszki (penalty scored); Ferenczi (penalty scored)		(penalty scored) Kodro; (penalty scored) Abu Fani; (penalty scored) Ramírez; (penalty scored) Marquinhos; (penalty scored) Zachariassen

29 February 2024	Szentlőrinc (3)	1–5	(2) Nyíregyháza	Szentlőrinc
13:00	Helesh 18'	Report	Novák 2', 27', 84'; Temesvári 37'; Beke 90+3'	Stadium: Sporttelep; Attendance: 600; Referee: Attila Molnár

29 February 2024	Újpest (1)	1–2 (a.e.t.)	(1) Paks	Budapest
17:00	Radošević 48'	Report	Skribek 21'; Könyves 110'	Stadium: Szusza Ferenc Stadion; Attendance: 2,389; Referee: Tamás Bognár

=== Quarter-finals ===
The eight Round of 16 winners entered the quarter-finals.

Number of teams per tier entering this round
Nemzeti Bajnokság I (1)	Nemzeti Bajnokság II (2)	Total
6 / 12	2 / 18	8 / 166

2 April 2024	Kisvárda (1)	3–2	(1) MTK Budapest	Kisvárda
18:00	Jovičić 9', 90'; Spasić 22'	Report	Bognár 58'; Hey 86'	Stadium: Várkerti Stadion; Attendance: 800; Referee: Gergő Bogár

3 April 2024	Vasas (2)	2–5 (a.e.t.)	(1) Paks	Budapest
15:15	Holender 59'; M. Tóth 85' (pen.)	Report	B. Tóth 44'; Papp 90'; Böde 94'; Hahn 115' (pen.); Windecker 119'	Stadium: Illovszky Rudolf Stadion; Attendance: 2,004; Referee: István Vad II.

3 April 2024	Diósgyőr (1)	0–2	(1) Ferencváros	Miskolc
18:00		Report	Zachariassen 37', 46'	Stadium: Diósgyőri Stadion; Attendance: 11,114; Referee: Sándor Andó-Szabó

4 April 2024	Nyíregyháza (2)	2–1	(1) Kecskemét	Balmazújváros (Note: Nyíregyháza plays their home match at Városi Sportpálya, Balmazújváros, instead of their regular stadium Városi Stadion in Nyíregyháza, which is undergoing reconstruction works.)
18:45	Gengeliczki 44'; Novák 69'	Report	Sigér 42' (o.g.)	Stadium: Városi Sportpálya; Attendance: 800; Referee: Csaba Pintér

=== Semi-finals ===
The four quarter-final winners entered the semi-finals.

Number of teams per tier entering this round
Nemzeti Bajnokság I (1)	Nemzeti Bajnokság II (2)	Total
3 / 12	1 / 18	4 / 166

23 April 2024	Paks (1)	2–1	(1) Kisvárda	Paks
18:00	Papp 27'; Hahn 53'	Report	Matić 21'	Stadium: Fehérvári úti Stadion; Attendance: 1,798; Referee: József Erdős

24 April 2024	Nyíregyháza (2)	1–2	(1) Ferencváros	Balmazújváros
18:00	Kovácsréti 68'	Report	Cissé 85'; Sevikyan 89'	Stadium: Városi Sportpálya; Attendance: 2,500; Referee: Gergő Bogár

=== Final ===
The final was held between the two semi-final winners.

15 May 2024	Paks (1)	2–0 (a.e.t.)	(1) Ferencváros	Budapest
16:00	Papp 98'; Haraszti 120+2'			Stadium: Puskás Aréna; Attendance: 51,900; Referee: Balázs Berke

== See also ==
- 2023–24 Nemzeti Bajnokság I
- 2023–24 Nemzeti Bajnokság II
- 2023–24 Nemzeti Bajnokság III
- 2023–24 Megyei Bajnokság I
