= 2020–21 Nemzeti Bajnokság III =

Nemzeti Bajnokság III
- Season: 2020–21
- Champions: III. Kerület (West); Iváncsa (Centre); Tiszakécske (East)
- Promoted: III. Kerület (West); Kecskemét (Centre); Tiszakécske (East)
- Relegated: Salgótarján (East); Gyöngyös (East); Hatvan (East); Sajóbábony (East); Mezőkövesd II

The 2020–21 Nemzeti Bajnokság III is Hungary's third-level football competition.

== Teams ==
The following teams have changed division since the 2019–20 season.

=== Stadium and locations ===
Following is the list of clubs competing in the league this season, with their location, stadium and stadium capacity.

==== Keleti (Eastern Group) ====
Location of teams in 2020–21 Nemzeti Bajnokság III - Eastern Group

Team	Location	Stadium	Capacity
Balassagyarmat	Balassagyarmat	Kövi Pál Sportközpont	1,500
Budapesti VSC	Budapest (Zugló)	Szőnyi úti Stadion	9,000
Cegléd	Cegléd	Zsengellér Gyula Sportközpont	4,000
Debrecen II	Debrecen	Dóczy József utcai Stadion	3,200
Eger	Eger	Szentmarjay Tibor Városi Stadion	3,200
Füzesgyarmat	Füzesgyarmat	Lázár Gyula Sportközpont	2,300
Gyöngyös	Gyöngyös	Kömlei Károly Sportközpont	3,000
Hatvan	Hatvan	Népkert Sportközpont	1,200
Jászberény	Jászberény	Városi Stadion	4,000
Kisvárda II	Kisvárda	Várkerti Stadion	2,993
Mezőkövesd II	Mezőkövesd	Városi Stadion	4,183
Diósgyőr II	Miskolc (Diósgyőr)	DVTK Stadion II	
Putnok	Putnok	Várady Béla Sportközpont	3,000
Sajóbábony	Sajóbábony	Borostyán Mihály Sportközpont	
Salgótarján	Salgótarján	Szojka Ferenc Stadion	7,000
Sényő	Sényő	Sényői Sportpálya	
Tállya	Tállya	Tállyai Sporttelep	2,000
Tiszafüred	Tiszafüred	Lipcsey Elemér Sporttelep	
Tiszakécske	Tiszakécske	Városi Stadion	4,500
Tiszaújváros	Tiszaújváros	Tiszaújvárosi Sport Park	4,000

==== Közép (Centre Group) ====
Location of teams in 2020–21 Nemzeti Bajnokság III - Centre Group

Team	Location	Stadium	Capacity
Budapest Honvéd-MFA	Budapest (Kispest)	Magyar Futball Akadémia	
Dabas–Gyón	Dabas	Tatárszentgyörgyi úti pálya	
Dabas	Dabas	Dabasi Sporttelep	2,500
Dunaújváros PASE	Dunaújváros	Eszperantó úti Stadion	12,000
Erzsébeti Spartacus	Budapest (Pesterzsébet)	Ady Endre utcai Stadion	5,000
Ferencváros II	Budapest (Ferencváros)	Sárosi György pálya	3,000
Hódmezővásárhely	Hódmezővásárhely	Városi Stadion	10,000
Iváncsa	Iváncsa	Iváncsai Sportpálya	
Kecskemét	Kecskemét	Széktói Stadion	6,320
Kozármisleny	Kozármisleny	Kozármislenyi Stadion	2,000
Körösladány	Körösladány	Körösladányi Sportálya	
Majos	Bonyhád (Majos)	Majosi Sportpálya	600
Monor	Monor	Balassi Bálint utcai Stadion	2,250
Paks II	Paks	Fehérvári úti Stadion	
Rákosmente	Budapest (Rákosmente)	Pesti úti Sportpálya	1,000
Szegedi VSE	Szeged	Szegedi VSE Stadion	5,000
Szekszárd	Szekszárd	Városi Stadion	7,500
Taksony	Taksony	Taksonyi Sportpálya	
Vác	Vác	Ligeti Stadion	9,000
Újpest II	Budapest (Újpest)	Chinoin Sportközpont	700

==== Nyugati (Western Group) ====
Location of teams in 2020–21 Nemzeti Bajnokság III - Western Group

Team	Location	Stadium	Capacity
III. Kerület	Budapest (Óbuda)	Hévízi úti Stadion	914
Balatonfüred	Balatonfüred	Városi Sportpálya	
Bicske	Bicske	Bicskei Sportpálya	
BKV Előre	Budapest	Sport utcai Stadion	2,500
Érd	Érd	Ercsi úti Pálya	3,500
Fehérvár II	Székesfehérvár	Sóstói Stadion, Műfüves	
Gárdony	Gárdony	Agárdi Parkerdő Sportközpont	1,400
Komárom	Komárom	Czibor Zoltán Városi Sporttelep	4,132
Lipót	Lipót	Lipóti Futball Center Edzőközpont	
Ménfőcsanak	Győr	Bezerédi utcai Pálya	
Mosonmagyaróvár	Mosonmagyaróvár	Wittmann Antal park	4,000
Nagyatád	Nagyatád	Mudin Imre Sportcentrum	
Nagykanizsa	Nagykanizsa	Olajbányász Sporttelep	7,000
Pápa	Pápa	Perutz Stadion	5,500
Puskás Akadémia II	Felcsút	PFLA füves IV. pálya	
Sopron	Sopron	Káposztás utcai Stadion	4,500
Szabadkikötő	Budapest (Csepel)	Szabadkikötő Sporttelep	1,000
Tatabánya	Tatabánya	Grosics Gyula Stadion	5,021
Veszprém	Veszprém	Városi Stadion	4,000
Zalaegerszeg II	Zalaegerszeg	ZTE Arena, Műfüves	1,000

=== Personnel and kits ===
==== Keleti (Eastern Group) ====
Team	Head coach	Captain	Kit manufacturer	Shirt sponsor
Balassagyarmat	(Hungary) Tibor Nagy		Adidas	Penta
Budapesti VSC	(Hungary) Krisztián Gabala		Puma	
Cegléd	(Hungary) László Makrai		Joma	Balogh Tészta
Debrecen II	(Hungary) Csaba Szatmári		Adidas	
Eger	(Hungary) Szilárd Sütő		Nike	Apollo Tyres
Füzesgyarmat	(Hungary) Ottó Fábián		Saller	
Gyöngyös	(Hungary) Antal Simon		Joma	Bezzegh
Hatvan	(Hungary) Gábor Gulyás		Joma	
Jászberény	(Hungary) Gyula Németh		Adidas	Jász Plasztik
Kisvárda II	(Hungary) Balázs Szabó		Adidas	MasterGood
Mezőkövesd II	(Hungary) Norbert Elek		Joma	Zsóry Bath
Diósgyőr II	(Hungary) Gyula Zsivóczky-Pandel		2Rule	
Putnok	(Hungary) Balázs Fehér		Adidas	Sajóvölgye Focisuli
Sajóbábony	(Hungary) Ferenc Vígh		Joma	Kis Kft.
Salgótarján	(Hungary) Richárd Rubint		Nike	
Sényő	(Hungary) László Imrő		Joma	Magnum-44-Security
Tállya	(Hungary) Attila Uray		Adidas	
Tiszafüred	(Hungary) Tibor Tóth		Adidas	Józsa Kft.
Tiszakécske	(Hungary) Sándor Nagy		2Rule	Duna Aszfalt
Tiszaújváros	(Hungary) Máté Gerliczki		Saller	

== Standings ==
=== Keleti (Eastern) ===
Pos	Team	Pld	W	D	L	GF	GA	GD	Pts	Promotion or relegation
1	Tiszakécske	38	30	4	4	94	27	+67	94	Promotion to Nemzeti Bajnokság II
2	Budapesti VSC	38	24	6	8	75	39	+36	78	
3	Jászberény	38	21	10	7	78	41	+37	73	
4	Füzesgyarmat	38	23	3	12	70	44	+26	72	
5	Kisvárda II	38	19	11	8	57	45	+12	68	
6	Eger	38	19	9	10	62	36	+26	66	
7	Balassagyarmati	38	18	10	10	46	32	+14	64	
8	Sényő	38	16	9	13	65	58	+7	57	
9	Diósgyőr II	38	15	9	14	65	57	+8	54	
10	Cegléd	38	14	8	16	45	47	−2	50	
11	Tiszaújváros	38	14	6	18	51	62	−11	48	
12	Tiszafüred	38	14	6	18	59	68	−9	48	
13	Debrecen II	38	12	10	16	58	59	−1	46	
14	Tállya	38	11	10	17	52	57	−5	43	
15	Putnok	38	11	9	18	56	74	−18	42	Possible Relegation to Megyei Bajnokság I
16	Salgótarjáni	38	11	8	19	54	76	−22	41	Relegation to Megyei Bajnokság I
17	Gyöngyös	38	10	9	19	54	80	−26	39	Relegation to Megyei Bajnokság I
18	Hatvan	38	11	5	22	45	63	−18	38	Relegation to Megyei Bajnokság I
19	Sajóbábony (R)	38	7	3	28	41	102	−61	24	Relegation to Megyei Bajnokság I
20	Mezőkövesd II (R)	38	5	5	28	43	103	−60	20	Relegation to Megyei Bajnokság I

Updated to match(es) played on 13 December 2020. Source: Soccerway
Rules for classification: 1) Points; 2) Head-to-head points; 3) Head-to-head goal difference; 4) Head-to-head goals scored; 5) Head-to-head away goals scored; 6) Goal difference; 7) Goals scored.
(R) Relegated

=== Közép ===
Pos	Team	Pld	W	D	L	GF	GA	GD	Pts	Promotion or relegation
1	Iváncsa	38	26	8	4	78	27	+51	86	
2	Kecskemét	38	24	8	6	90	32	+58	80	Promotion to Nemzeti Bajnokság II
3	Dabas	38	20	14	4	66	29	+37	74	
4	Budapest Honvéd II	38	22	6	10	83	50	+33	72	
5	Ferencváros II	38	20	10	8	75	36	+39	70	
6	Erzsébeti Spartacus	38	15	12	11	56	50	+6	57	
7	Kozármisleny	38	17	6	15	70	56	+14	57	
8	Monor	38	15	11	12	64	54	+10	56	
9	Dabas–Gyón	38	17	4	17	48	45	+3	55	
10	Paks II	38	14	10	14	60	56	+4	52	
11	Újpest II	38	13	12	13	58	50	+8	51	
12	Rákosmente	38	13	9	16	40	48	−8	48	
13	Vác	38	12	11	15	52	54	−2	47	
14	Dunaújváros PASE	38	14	5	19	52	56	−4	47	
15	Szekszárd	38	13	8	17	41	53	−12	47	Possible Relegation to Megyei Bajnokság I
16	Hódmezővásárhely	38	14	4	20	48	72	−24	46	Relegation to Megyei Bajnokság I
17	Körösladány	38	10	10	18	59	71	−12	40	Relegation to Megyei Bajnokság I
18	Taksony	38	8	8	22	49	95	−46	32	Relegation to Megyei Bajnokság I
19	Szegedi VSE (R)	38	5	9	24	30	94	−64	24	Relegation to Megyei Bajnokság I
20	Majosi (R)	38	3	5	30	27	118	−91	14	Relegation to Megyei Bajnokság I

Updated to match(es) played on 13 December 2020. Source: Soccerway
Rules for classification: 1) Points; 2) Head-to-head points; 3) Head-to-head goal difference; 4) Head-to-head goals scored; 5) Head-to-head away goals scored; 6) Goal difference; 7) Goals scored.
(R) Relegated

=== Nyugati ===
Pos	Team	Pld	W	D	L	GF	GA	GD	Pts	Promotion or relegation
1	III. Kerület	38	27	7	4	90	22	+68	88	Promotion to Nemzeti Bajnokság II
2	Mosonmagyaróvár	38	22	8	8	79	35	+44	74	
3	Veszprém	38	20	10	8	62	44	+18	70	
4	Nagykanizsa	38	19	9	10	77	50	+27	66	
5	Lipót	38	18	9	11	66	56	+10	63	
6	Tatabánya	38	18	7	13	56	40	+16	61	
7	Sopron	38	17	10	11	55	49	+6	61	
8	Puskás Akadémia II	38	17	5	16	66	51	+15	56	
9	Komárom	38	17	5	16	52	58	−6	56	
10	Érd	38	15	9	14	51	54	−3	54	
11	Balatonfüred	38	15	7	16	69	58	+11	52	
12	Bicske	38	14	8	16	42	50	−8	50	
13	Zalaegerszeg II	38	12	13	13	56	63	−7	49	
14	Fehérvár II	38	13	8	17	52	58	−6	47	
15	Pápa	38	12	9	17	46	56	−10	45	Possible Relegation to Megyei Bajnokság I
16	BKV Előre	38	10	14	14	46	60	−14	44	Relegation to Megyei Bajnokság I
17	Gárdony	38	12	8	18	58	82	−24	44	Relegation to Megyei Bajnokság I
18	Szabadkikötő (R)	38	10	7	21	63	82	−19	37	Relegation to Megyei Bajnokság I
19	Ménfőcsanak (R)	38	7	8	23	37	72	−35	29	Relegation to Megyei Bajnokság I
20	Nagyatád (R)	38	3	3	32	32	115	−83	12	Relegation to Megyei Bajnokság I

Updated to match(es) played on 13 December 2020. Source: Soccerway
Rules for classification: 1) Points; 2) Head-to-head points; 3) Head-to-head goal difference; 4) Head-to-head goals scored; 5) Head-to-head away goals scored; 6) Goal difference; 7) Goals scored.
(R) Relegated

== See also ==
- 2020–21 Magyar Kupa
- 2020–21 Megyei Bajnokság I
- 2020–21 Nemzeti Bajnokság II
- 2020–21 Nemzeti Bajnokság I
