= 2022–23 Nemzeti Bajnokság III =

Nemzeti Bajnokság III
- Season: 2022–23
- Champions: BVSC-Zugló (East); Iváncsa (Centre); Veszprém (West)
- Promoted: BVSC-Zugló
- Relegated: Jászberény (East)
- Matches: 1,102
- Goals: 3,245 (2.94 per match)
- Top goalscorer: Kristóf Sármány (Hatvan); East (21 goals); Viktor Haragos (Monor); Centre (18 goals); Bence Lőrincz (Nagykanizsa); West (29 goals)

The 2022–23 Nemzeti Bajnokság III is Hungary's third-level football competition.

== Teams ==
The following teams have changed division since the 2021–22 season.

=== Team changes ===
==== To NB III ====
Relegated from 2021–22 Nemzeti Bajnokság II	Promoted from 2021–22 Megyei Bajnokság I
▼ Szolnok ▼ Budaörs ▼III. Kerület	▲ Körösladány (Békés) ▲ Hatvan (Heves) ▲ Pénzügyőr (Budapest) ▲ Karcag (Jász-Nagykun-Szolnok) ▲ Majos (Tolna) ▲ Pécsi EAC (Baranya) ▲ Bánk (Nógrád) ▲ Kecskemét II (Bács-Kiskun) ▲ Teskánd (Zala) ▲ Mór (Fejér) ▲ Zsámbék (Pest) ▲ Csorna (Győr-Moson-Sopron)

==== From NB III ====
Promoted to 2022–23 Nemzeti Bajnokság II	Relegated to 2022–23 Megyei Bajnokság I
▲ Kazincbarcika (East) ▲ Kozármisleny (Centre) ▲ Mosonmagyaróvár (West)	▼ Salgótarján (Nógrád) ▼ Hidasnémeti (Borsod-Abaúj-Zemplén) ▼ Tállya (Borsod-Abaúj-Zemplén) ▼ Törökszentmiklós (Jász-Nagykun-Szolnok) ▼ Mohács (Baranya) ▼ Dabas-Gyón (Pest) ▼ Rákosmente (Budapest) ▼ Gerjen (Tolna) ▼ Sopron (Győr-Moson-Sopron) ▼ Gárdony (Fejér) ▼ Andráshida (Zala)

== Standings ==
=== Eastern group ===
Pos	Team	Pld	W	D	L	GF	GA	GD	Pts	Promotion or relegation
1	BVSC-Zugló (C, O, P)	38	32	6	0	101	15	+86	102	Qualification to promotion play-offs
2	Putnok	38	24	7	7	70	46	+24	79	
3	Debreceni EAC	38	20	7	11	65	29	+36	67	
4	Debreceni VSC II	38	19	8	11	84	57	+27	65	
5	Körösladány	38	17	9	12	57	55	+2	60	
6	Kisvárda II	38	16	11	11	63	42	+21	59	
7	Karcag	38	17	7	14	58	51	+7	58	
8	Sényő	38	16	9	13	58	66	−8	57	
9	BKV Előre	38	15	6	17	55	55	0	51	
10	Pénzügyőr	38	14	8	16	57	50	+7	50	
11	Hatvan	38	15	4	19	64	73	−9	49	
12	Diósgyőr II	38	14	7	17	52	58	−6	49	
13	Tiszaújváros	38	14	6	18	53	73	−20	48	
14	Vasas II	38	13	9	16	70	60	+10	48	
15	Füzesgyarmat	38	13	8	17	52	59	−7	47	
16	Tiszafüred	38	13	7	18	56	70	−14	46	
17	Hajdúszoboszló	38	12	10	16	45	50	−5	46	Possible Relegation to Megyei Bajnokság I
18	Eger	38	12	8	18	50	56	−6	44	Relegation to Megyei Bajnokság I
19	Békéscsaba II	38	6	7	25	53	103	−50	25	Relegation to Megyei Bajnokság I
20	Jászberény (R)	38	4	4	30	28	123	−95	16	Relegation to Megyei Bajnokság I

Updated to match(es) played on 21 May 2023. Source: Soccerway
Rules for classification: 1) Points; 2) Matches won; 3) Goal difference; 4) Goals scored; 5) Head-to-head points; 6) Head-to-head goal difference; 7) Fair play ranking; 8) Drawing of lots.
(C) Champions; (O) Play-off winners; (P) Promoted; (R) Relegated

=== Central group ===
Pos	Team	Pld	W	D	L	GF	GA	GD	Pts	Promotion or relegation
1	Iváncsa (Note: On 9 May 2023, Iváncsa was deducted 4 points since an unauthorized player played against Újpest II.) (C)	34	27	2	5	86	33	+53	79	Qualification to promotion play-offs
2	Hódmezővásárhely	34	23	5	6	67	33	+34	74	
3	ESMTK	34	19	8	7	57	27	+30	65	
4	MTK Budapest II	34	18	5	11	73	40	+33	59	
5	Budapest Honvéd II	34	17	7	10	51	46	+5	58	
6	Ferencváros II	34	17	5	12	60	43	+17	56	
7	Pécsi EAC	34	16	8	10	47	31	+16	56	
8	Dunaújváros	34	15	6	13	67	49	+18	51	
9	Újpest II	34	16	2	16	42	56	−14	50	
10	Monor	34	13	6	15	58	54	+4	45	
11	Paks II	34	11	10	13	55	58	−3	43	
12	Szolnok	34	11	8	15	50	56	−6	41	
13	Szekszárd	34	11	7	16	35	48	−13	40	
14	Majos	34	11	6	17	37	50	−13	39	
15	Kecskemét II	34	10	5	19	44	67	−23	35	
16	Dabas	34	8	6	20	29	66	−37	30	
17	Cegléd	34	8	3	23	40	81	−41	27	Possible Relegation to Megyei Bajnokság I
18	Bánk (Note: On 24 April 2023, Bánk was deducted 4 points since an unauthorized player played against Kecskemét II.)	34	5	1	28	30	90	−60	12	Relegation to Megyei Bajnokság I
19	Balassagyarmat (Note: On 20 and 27 September 2023, Balassagyarmat and Makó withdrew from the league, following the 2021–2023 global energy crisis.)	0	0	0	0	0	0	0	0	Withdrawn
20	Makó	0	0	0	0	0	0	0	0	Withdrawn

Updated to match(es) played on 21 May 2023. Source: Soccerway
Rules for classification: 1) Points; 2) Matches won; 3) Goal difference; 4) Goals scored; 5) Head-to-head points; 6) Head-to-head goal difference; 7) Fair play ranking; 8) Drawing of lots.
(C) Champions

=== Western group ===
Pos	Team	Pld	W	D	L	GF	GA	GD	Pts	Promotion or relegation
1	Veszprém (C)	38	28	8	2	82	24	+58	92	Qualification to promotion play-offs
2	Tatabánya	38	28	6	4	77	35	+42	90	
3	Nagykanizsa	38	28	3	7	105	41	+64	87	
4	Puskás Akadémia II	38	20	10	8	77	35	+42	70	
5	III. Kerület	38	20	8	10	82	40	+42	68	
6	Érd	38	20	5	13	55	33	+22	65	
7	Bicske	38	18	9	11	59	41	+18	63	
8	Kaposvár	38	18	6	14	58	44	+14	60	
9	Budaörs	38	17	9	12	56	43	+13	60	
10	Balatonfüred	38	15	11	12	50	52	−2	56	
11	Fehérvár II	38	16	7	15	48	56	−8	55	
12	Komárom	38	14	11	13	57	53	+4	53	
13	Győr II	38	14	10	14	61	60	+1	52	
14	Gyirmót II	38	11	6	21	65	83	−18	39	
15	Zalaegerszeg II	38	11	5	22	45	83	−38	38	
16	Kelen	38	7	11	20	42	60	−18	32	
17	Csorna	38	6	9	23	42	85	−43	27	Possible Relegation to Megyei Bajnokság I
18	Teskánd	38	7	4	27	50	111	−61	25	Relegation to Megyei Bajnokság I
19	Mór	38	5	6	27	35	93	−58	21	Relegation to Megyei Bajnokság I
20	Zsámbék	38	3	4	31	33	107	−74	13	Relegation to Megyei Bajnokság I

Updated to match(es) played on 21 May 2023. Source: Soccerway
Rules for classification: 1) Points; 2) Matches won; 3) Goal difference; 4) Goals scored; 5) Head-to-head points; 6) Head-to-head goal difference; 7) Fair play ranking; 8) Drawing of lots.
(C) Champions

== See also ==
- 2022–23 Magyar Kupa
- 2022–23 Nemzeti Bajnokság I
- 2022–23 Nemzeti Bajnokság II
- 2022–23 Megyei Bajnokság I
