= Majosi SE =

Hungarian football club

- Full name: Majosi Sport Egyesület
- Founded: 1964; 62 years ago
- League: NB III; Southwest
- 2024–25: NB III; Southwest, 8th of 16
Home colours

Majosi Sport Egyesület is a professional football club based in Bonyhád, Hungary, that competes in the Nemzeti Bajnokság III – Southwest, the third tier of Hungarian football.

== Honours ==
=== County Leagues (Tolna) ===
- Megyei Bajnokság I (level 4)
  - Winners (3): 2012–13, 2019–20, 2021–22

== Season results ==
As of 30 May 2025.

Domestic												International		Manager	Ref.
Nemzeti Bajnokság											Magyar Kupa	Competition	Result	Manager	Ref.
Div.	No.	Season	MP	W	D	L	GF–GA	Dif.	Pts.	Pos.	Magyar Kupa	Competition	Result	Manager	Ref.
NB III (Közép csoport)	1.	2020–21	38	3	5	30	27–118	-91	14	20 of 20 ↓	First round (Round of 128)	Did not qualify		(Hungary) Tihanyvári	
MB I (Tolna)	2.	2021–22	27	21	3	3	87–21	+66	66	1 of 10 ↑	Did not qualify	Did not qualify		N/A	
NB III (Közép csoport)	3.	2022–23	34	11	6	17	37–50	-13	39	14 of 18	Did not qualify	Did not qualify		N/A	
NB III (Dél-Nyugati csoport)	4.	2023–24	30	9	4	17	31–58	-27	31	10 of 16	Third round (Round of 64)	Did not qualify		N/A	
NB III (Dél-Nyugati csoport)	5.	2024–25	30	11	7	12	40–45	-5	40	8 of 16	Second round	Did not qualify		N/A	
