= Körösladányi MSK =

Association football club in Körösladány, Hungary

Coordinates: 46°57′29.7″N 21°05′11.1″E

Körösladány
- Full name: Körösladány Medosz Sportkör
- Founded: 1952; 74 years ago
- Ground: Körösladányi Sportpálya, Körösladány
- Chairman: János Antal
- 2023–24: NB III; Southeast, 4th of 16
- Website: korosladanymsk.hu
Home colours	Away colours

Körösladány Medosz Sportkör is a Hungarian professional football club based in Körösladány, Békés County. The club had withdrawn from the Hungarian league system ahead of the 2024–25 season.

== History ==
On 10 June 2024, the club's board announced that the senior team would cease to exist and would focus only on the youth department following a historic 4th place finish in the Nemzeti Bajnokság III.

== Stadium ==
The club's home ground is behind the town's castle. In the summer of 2014, the main field of the sports complex was completely redesigned and two artificial turf fields were added to it, with work completed in the fall of 2014.

== Seasons ==
Season-by-season performance of the club:

Season	Level	Place	Magyar Kupa
1955	5	4th	—
1957–58	5	9th	—
1958–59	5	2nd	—
1959–60	5	11th	—
1960–61	5	16th ↓	—
1962–63	6	6th ↓	—
1963	7	1st	—
1964	7	1st ↑	—
1965	6	11th	—
1966	6	10th	—
1967	6	3rd	—
1968	6	1st ↑	—
1969	5	17th ↓	—
1970	6	5th	—
1970–71	6	15th ↓	—
1971–72	7	11th	—
1972–73	7	9th	—
1973–74	7	2nd ↑	—
1974–75	6	2nd ↑	—
1975–76	5	12th	—

Season	Level	Place	Magyar Kupa
1976–77	5	9th ↓	—
1977–78	6	10th ↑	—
1978–79	5	3rd	—
1979–80	5	2nd	—
1980–81	5	2nd	—
1981–82	5	4th	—
1982–83	5	14th	—
1983–84	5	9th	—
1984–85	5	11th	—
1985–86	5	7th	—
1986–87	5	4th	—
1987–88	5	6th	—
1988–89	5	8th	—
1989–90	5	11th ↓	—
1990–91	6	1st ↑	—
1991–92	5	13th	—
1992–93	5	15th ↓	—
1993–94	6	3rd	—
1994–95	6	1st ↑	—
1995–96	5	13th	—

Season	Level	Place	Magyar Kupa
1996–97	5	14th ↓	—
1997–98	6	6th	—
1998–99	6	1st ↑	—
1999–2000	5	5th	—
2000–01	5	3rd	—
2001–02	5	4th	—
2002–03	5	14th ↓	—
2003–04	6	8th	—
2004–05	6	7th ↑	—
2005–06	5	14th ↓	—
2006–07	6	1st ↑	—
2007–08	5	5th	—
2008–09	5	3rd	—
2009–10	4	11th	—
2010–11	4	15th ↓	—
2011–12	5	4th	—
2012–13	5	1st ↑	—
2013–14	4	4th	—
2014–15	4	9th	—
2015–16	4	5th	—

Season	Level	Place	Magyar Kupa
2016–17	4	4th	—
2017–18	4	3rd	—
2018–19	4	2nd	Round of 128
2019–20	4	1st ↑	Round of 128
2020–21	3	17th ↓	Round of 128
2021–22	4	1st ↑	First round
2022–23	3	5th	First round
2023–24	3	4th	Round of 64

== Honours and achievements ==
=== County Leagues (Békés) ===
- Megyei Bajnokság I (level 4)
  - Winners (2): 2019–20, 2021–22
  - Runners-up (1): 2018–19
- Megyei Bajnokság II (level 5)
  - Winners (1): 2012–13
  - Runners-up (3): 1958–59, 1979–80, 1980–81
- Megyei Bajnokság III (level 6)
  - Winners (5): 1968, 1990–91, 1994–95, 1998–99, 2006–07
  - Runners-up (1): 1974–75
- Megyei Bajnokság IV (level 7)
  - Winners (2): 1963, 1964
  - Runners-up (1): 1973–74
