= Zsengellér Gyula Sportcentrum =

Sports stadium in Cegléd, Hungary

Coordinates: 47°11′5″N 19°47′34″E

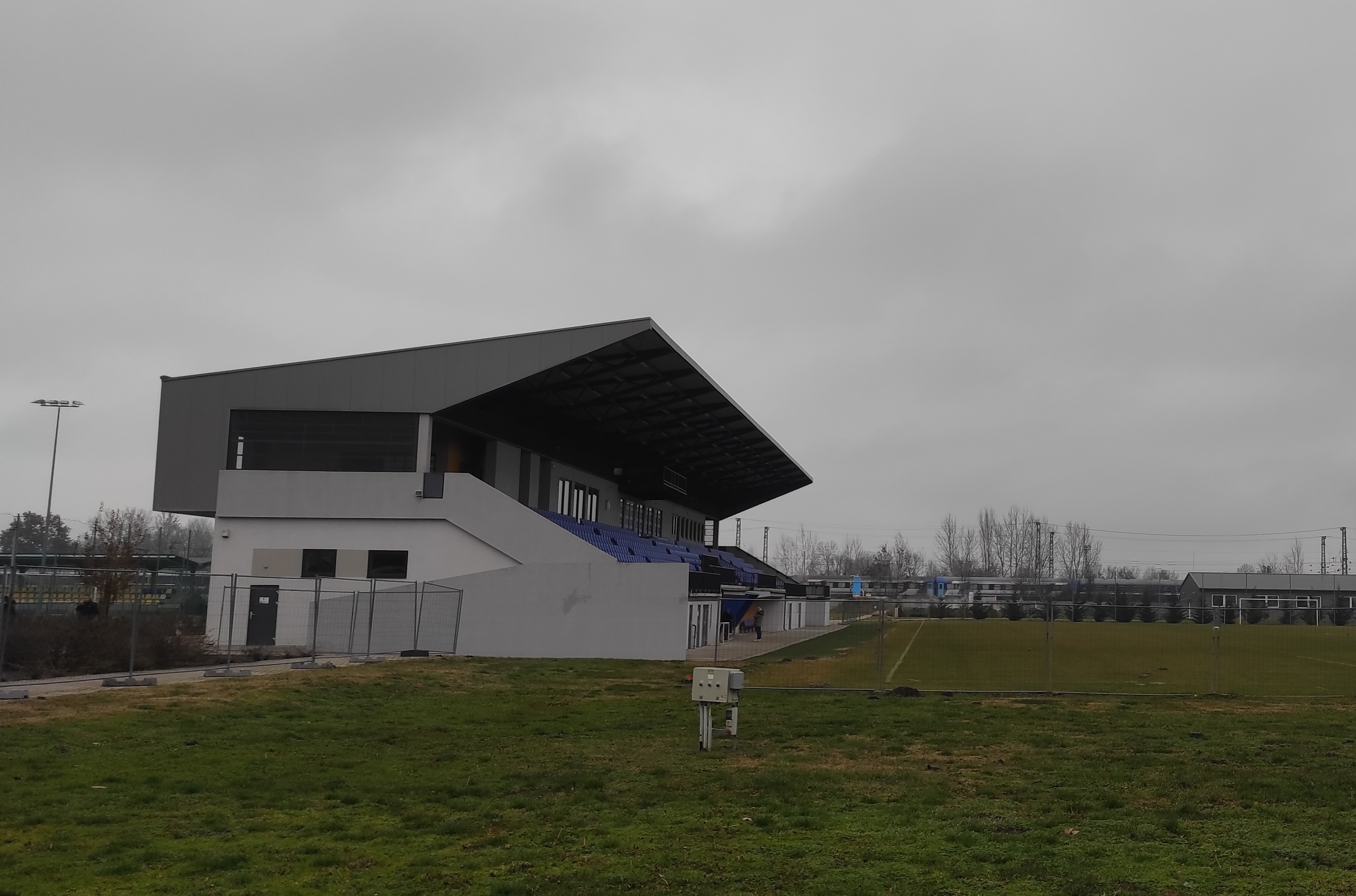
- Interactive map of Zsengellér Gyula Sportcentrum
- Location: Cegléd, Hungary
- Capacity: 4,000
- Field size: 110 x 64 meters

Construction
- Opened: July 3, 1926; 100 years ago

Tenant
- Ceglédi VSE

Zsengellér Gyula Sportcentrum also known as the Malomtó széli stadion, is a sports stadium in Cegléd, Hungary. The stadium is home to the association football club Ceglédi VSE. The stadium has a capacity of 4,000.

== Attendance ==
=== Records ===
Record Attendance:

- 12,500 Cegléd v MTK, February 15, 1989
