= Tarpa =

- Flag Coat of arms
- Interactive map of Tarpa
- Location of Tarpa in Hungary Tarpa (Hungary)
- Coordinates: 48.1039°N 22.5272°E
- Country: Hungary
- Region: Northern Great Plain
- County: Szabolcs-Szatmár-Bereg

Area
  - Total: 49.73 km^{2} (19.20 sq mi)

Population (2015)
  - Total: 2,322
  - Density: 46.69/km^{2} (120.9/sq mi)
- Time zone: UTC+1 (CET)
  - Summer (DST): UTC+2 (CEST)
- Postal code: 4931
- Area code: +36 45
- Website: http://www.tarpa.eu

Tarpa is a village in Szabolcs-Szatmár-Bereg county, in the Northern Great Plain region of eastern Hungary.

== Geography ==
It covers an area of 49.73 km^{2} (19 sq mi) and has a population of 2322 people (2015).

== History ==
The name 'arpa' was first mentioned in a charter as Tarpa in 1299 and then as Thorpa in 1321 and Corpa in 1332. By this time his church, named after St. Andrew, was already standing. The Tarpai family already owned the village in the 13th century. In the register of papal tithes of 1333, it was called Torpa. The settlement with an irregular floor plan already had the status of a market town in the Middle Ages. On March 1, 1626, Prince Gábor Bethlen granted the settlement a letter of privilege, which ensured free trade and complete duty-free treatment throughout the country. In 1665 he received the right to hold national fairs from King Leopold I. The modified market town of Szatmár County played an important role in the hiding movement preparing for the Rákóczi's War of Independence. The local-born Tamás Esze, II. The inevitable merit of Francis II Rákóczi's serf was that in the spring of 1703 it was not Imre Thököly, who was living in exile in Turkey, but the young Rákóczi, who was hiding on Polish soil, that he was defeated. Rákóczi not only took Tamás Esze and his family under his patronage, but also gave Tarpa the privilege of Hajdúváros.

After the war of independence, the settlement was treated by the chambers. There were no manorial estates in the settlement. It was always inhabited by small and medium peasants. In addition to large-scale animal husbandry and fruit production, many folk craftsmen contributed to its enrichment, the Tarpa shingles, flour barrels and wine barrels were famous. Traders in Tarpa carried the goods far from Maramureș to Hegyalja. The centuries-old past of the village can still be discovered in the structure of the settlement. Most of today's streets were already in the 18th century, the former street names still live on the lips of the people: Nagy Waist, Tóhát, Hajnal, Kis utca, Venice. Irregular, mostly curved streets are connected by "straits". At the junction of the streets, funnel-like spaces usually developed and were built. Row plots with row and cross barrels are common, where there is no barn, the yard is mostly separated from the garden by a pound, sometimes by a plank fence, the passage of which is closed by the capitalist gate. On Kossuth, Rákóczi, Hunyadi and Árpád streets, there are still many folk classicist dwelling houses and “talking” loopholes (perhaps it was named because people talked under the covered gate), as well as an outbuilding. Endre Bajcsy-Zsilinszky (1886–1944) died a martyr in the Second World War between 1931 and 1935.
