= Nemesapáti =

Coordinates: 46°52′N 16°57′E

- Village
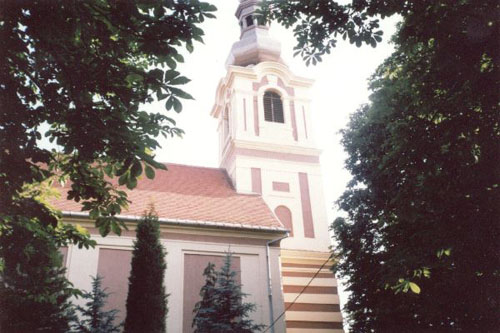
- Nemesapáti templom
- Interactive map of Nemesapáti
- Country: Hungary
- Region: Western Transdanubia
- County: Zala County
- Time zone: UTC+1 (CET)
  - Summer (DST): UTC+2 (CEST)

Nemesapáti is a village in Zala County, Hungary, Europe.
