= Ceglédi VSE =

Hungarian football club

- Full name: Ceglédi Vasutas Sportegyesület
- Founded: 1935; 91 years ago
- Ground: Zsengellér Gyula Sportcentrum, Cegléd
- Capacity: 4,000
- Chairman: József Horváth
- Manager: Balázs Schmidt
- League: NB III; Southeast
- 2022–23: NB III; Centre, 17th of 20
Home colours	Away colours

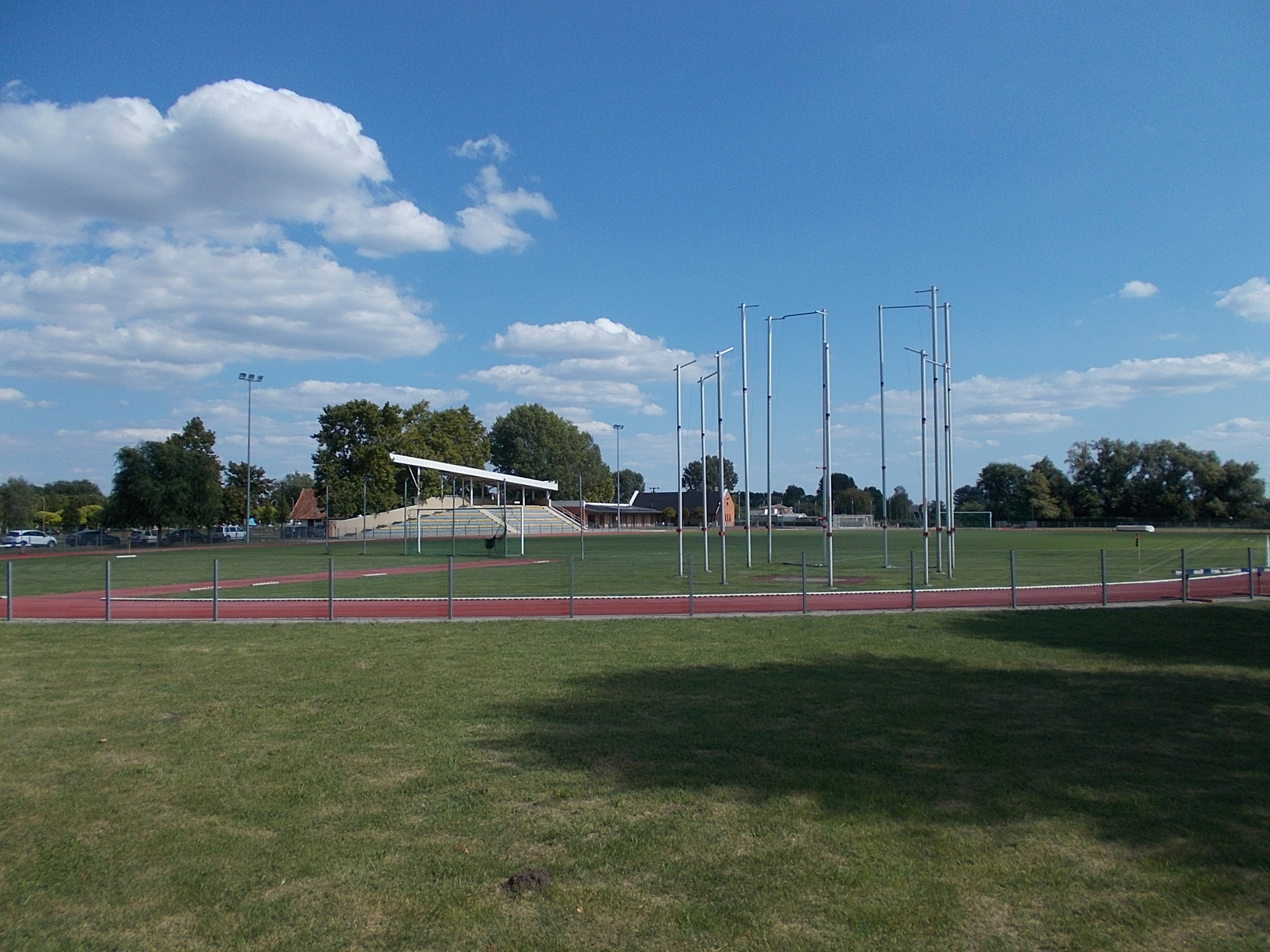
Ecsedi László Sportcentrum, where Ceglédi VSE plays

Ceglédi Vasutas Sportegyesület, commonly referred to as Ceglédi VSE is a Hungarian sports club based in Cegléd, Pest County. It consists of multiple departments, namely football, athletics and wrestling. The team's colours are yellow and blue.

== History ==
On 3 March 1935, Ceglédi Vasutas Sportegyesület ("Cegléd Railway Sports Association") was established on the initiative of railway station chief Dr. Gyula Stankaai, and officers Kornél Ginovszky and József Gámán. The adopted statutes set out the objectives of the new club, intended to further bring together the railway workers through sports. In the first year, 153 regular railwaymen and 98 family members became members of the club.

Members of the club would excel in various sports, with club wrestler József Gál becoming the first Hungarian world champions in lightweight at the 1950 World Wrestling Championships, as well as competing in the 1952 Summer Olympics. At the 1952 Summer Olympics, club pentathlon athlete István Szondy received a gold medal in the team modern pentathlon event and a bronze in the individual event. In recent times, wrestler Tamás Lőrincz from the club won the silver medal at the 2012 Summer Olympics in the Greco-Roman 66 kg event and a gold medal in the men's 77 kg event at the 2020 Summer Olympics held in Tokyo, Japan.

In the footballing department, Ceglédi VSE has experienced modest success, achieving promotion in the 2006–07 season as champions of its third division season.

== Honours ==
- Nemzeti Bajnokság III
  - Winners (4): 1948–49, 1949–50, 1959–60, 2006–07

== Seasons ==
The table below shows the seasons of Ceglédi VSE.

Season	Tier	Club's name	Position	Pts
1935–36	4	Ceglédi Vasutas SE	3 / 9	17
1936–37	4	Ceglédi Vasutas SE	1 / 8	23
1937–38	3	Ceglédi VSE	4 / 11	24
1938–39	4	Ceglédi VSE	2 / 11	32
1939–40	4	Ceglédi VSE	1 / 7	22
1940–41	4	Ceglédi VSE	5 / 14	29
1941–42	4	Ceglédi Vasutas SE	3 / 13	33
1942–43	3	Ceglédi Vasutas SE	7 / 14	26
1943–44	3	Ceglédi VSE	8 / 15	28
1944–45	2	Ceglédi VSE	6 / 16	6
1944–45	3	Ceglédi Vasutas SE	0 / 13	
1945	2	Ceglédi Vasutas SE	1 / 9	
1945–46	2	Ceglédi Vasutas SE	1 / 12	29
1946–47	2	Ceglédi VSE	5 / 14	31
1947–48	2	Ceglédi VSE	8 / 14	28
1948–49	2	Ceglédi VSE	14 / 16	21
1949–50	3	Ceglédi VSK	1 / 16	46
1950	2	Ceglédi VSK	14 / 16	8
1951	2	Ceglédi Lokomotív	11 / 14	22
1952	2	Ceglédi Lokomotív	8 / 18	34
1953	2	Ceglédi Lokomotív	12 / 16	26
1954	2	Ceglédi Lokomotív	7 / 16	32
1955	2	Ceglédi Törekvés	16 / 16	18
1956	3	Ceglédi Törekvés	1 / 14	39
1957	2	Ceglédi Vasutas SE	3 / 6	10
1957–58	2	Ceglédi Vasutas SE	7 / 19	39
1958–59	2	Ceglédi Vasutas SE	16 / 16	19
1959–60	3	Ceglédi VSE	1 / 17	41
1960–61	2	Ceglédi VSE	12 / 16	25
1961–62	2	Ceglédi VSE	14 / 16	28
1962–63	3	Ceglédi VSE	15 / 16	23
1963	4	Ceglédi VSE	5 / 16	17
1964	4	Ceglédi VSE	5 / 16	36
1965	4	Ceglédi VSE	1 / 16	44
1966	3	Ceglédi VSE	14 / 18	28
1967	3	Ceglédi VSE	5 / 16	33
1968	3	Ceglédi VSE	3 / 16	37
1969	3	Ceglédi VSE	11 / 16	28
1970	3	Ceglédi VSE	3 / 16	17
1970–71	3	Ceglédi VSE	2 / 16	41
1971–72	3	Ceglédi VSE	11 / 16	27
1972–73	3	Ceglédi VSE	8 / 16	29
1973–74	3	Ceglédi VSE	9 / 16	27
1974–75	3	Ceglédi VSE	16 / 20	32
1975–76	4	Ceglédi Vasutas SE	2 / 16	43
1976–77	3	Ceglédi VSE	19 / 20	24
1977–78	3	Ceglédi VSE	17 / 20	26
1978–79	3	Ceglédi VSE	7 / 18	36
1979–80	3	Ceglédi Vasutas SE	12 / 18	27
1980–81	3	Ceglédi Vasutas SE	15 / 18	25
1981–82	4	Ceglédi Vasutas SE	7 / 16	35
1982–83	4	Ceglédi VSE	12 / 16	22
1983–84	4	Ceglédi Vasutas SE	6 / 16	32
1984–85	4	Ceglédi VSE	5 / 16	35
1985–86	4	Ceglédi VSE	12 / 16	24
1986–87	4	Ceglédi VSE	12 / 16	28
1987–88	4	Cegléd	13 / 16	20
1988–89	4	Ceglédi VSE	16 / 16	17
1989–90	5	Ceglédi VSE	7 / 14	27
1992–93	3	Ceglédi Kossuth Honvéd SE	13 / 16	24
1993–94	3	Ceglédi Kossuth Honvéd SE	10 / 16	29
1994–95	3	Ceglédi Kossuth Honvéd SE	12 / 16	32
1995–96	3	Ceglédi Kossuth Honvéd SE	14 / 16	23
1996–97	4	Ceglédi Kossuth Honvéd SE	12 / 18	38
1997–98	5	Ceglédi VSE	4 / 18	71
1998–99	5	Cegléd	3 / 18	65
1999–00	2	Cegléd FC	7 / 20	59
2000	2	TFC-Cegléd	6 / 7	15
2000–01	3	TFC-Cegléd	12 / 12	
2001–02	5	Ceglédi VSE	13 / 16	29
2002–03	5	Ceglédi VSE	5 / 16	47
2003–04	4	Cegléd VSE	7 / 16	48
2004–05	4	Ceglédi VSE	7 / 14	37
2005–06	3	Ceglédi VSE	10 / 15	38
2006–07	3	Ceglédi VSE	1 / 14	57
2007–08	2	Ceglédi VSE	10 / 16	35
2008–09	2	Restart-Ceglédi VSE	10 / 16	37
2009–10	2	Restart-Ceglédi VSE	14 / 15	27
2010–11	2	Restart-Ceglédi VSE	12 / 16	30
2011–12	2	Restart-Ceglédi VSE	4 / 16	47
2012–13	2	Restart-Ceglédi VSE	9 / 16	40
2013–14	2	Ceglédi VSE	13 / 16	31
2014–15	2	Ceglédi VSE	15 / 16	27
2015–16	3	Ceglédi VSE	2 / 17	76
2016–17	2	Ceglédi VSE	17 / 20	39
2017–18	2	Ceglédi VSE	9 / 20	52
2018–19	2	Ceglédi VSE	18 / 20	32
2019–20	3	Ceglédi VSE	3 / 16	36
2020–21	3	Ceglédi VSE	10 / 20	50
2021–22	3	Ceglédi VSE	15 / 20	41
2022–23	3	Ceglédi VSE	17 / 20	27
2023–24	3	Ceglédi VSE	16 / 16	13
2024–25	4	Ceglédi VSE	5 / 16	49
2025–26	4	Ceglédi VSE	5 / 16	50
