= Tállya KSE =

Hungarian football club

- Full name: Tállya Községi Sportegyesület
- Founded: 1959; 67 years ago
- Ground: Tállyai Sporttelep
- Capacity: 2,000
- League: NB III
- 2020–21: NB III, East, 14th
Home colours

Tállya Községi Sportegyesület is a professional football club based in Tállya, Borsod-Abaúj-Zemplén County, Hungary, that competes in the Nemzeti Bajnokság III, the third tier of Hungarian football.

== Name changes ==
- 1959–90: Tállyai Építők
- 1990–present:Tállya KSE

== Season results ==
The table below shows the seasons of Tállya KSE.

As of 6 August 2017

Season	Tier	Club's name	Position	Pts
1957	5	Tállyai Építők	0 / 6	
1959–60	6	Tállyai Építők SK	4 / 9	18
1961–62	5	Tállyai Építők	2 / 12	26
1962–63	5	Tállyai Építők	2 / 16	43
1963	6	Tállyai Építők	5 / 16	21
1964	6	Tállyai Építők	1 / 16	47
1965	5	Tállyai Építők	4 / 16	35
1966	5	Tállyai Építők	5 / 16	35
1967	5	Tállya	4 / 16	35
1968	5	Tállyai Építők	4 / 16	35
1969	5	Tállyai Építők	7 / 16	30
1970	5	Tállyai Építők	8 / 16	17
1970–71	5	Tállyai Építők	2 / 16	41
1971–72	5	Tállyai Építők	7 / 16	32
1972–73	5	Tállya	4 / 16	34
1973–74	5	Tállyai Építők	9 / 16	30
1974–75	4	Tállyai Építők	13 / 18	32
1975–76	4	Tállyai Építők	6 / 17	35
1976–77	4	Tállyai Építők	6 / 20	44
1977–78	4	Tállyai Építők	13 / 20	31
1978–79	3	Tállya	3 / 18	46
1979–80	3	Tállya	13 / 18	29
1980–81	3	Tállyai Építők	14 / 18	24
1981–82	4	Tállyai Építők SE	6 / 13	24
1982–83	4	Tállya	14 / 14	
1991–92	6	Tállya	7 / 9	2
1992–93	6	Tállya	8 / 8	1
1993–94	6	Tállya	2 / 11	32
1994–95	6	Tállya	1 / 12	20
1995–96	6	Tállya	6 / 13	21
1996–97	6	Tállya	11 / 11	12
1997–98	7	Tállya	8 / 12	20
1998–99	7	Tállya	3 / 13	46
1999–00	7	Tállya	8 / 11	26
2000–01	7	Tállya	4 / 12	37
2001–02	7	Tállya	4 / 12	40
2002–03	7	Tállya	8 / 12	28
2003–04	7	Tállya	1 / 11	46
2004–05	6	Tállya	11 / 16	34
2005–06	5	Tállya	10 / 16	36
2006–07	5	Tállya	3 / 16	60
2007–08	5	Tállya KSE	1 / 16	69
2008–09	4	Tállya	2 / 18	72
2009–10	4	Tállya KSE	3 / 18	63
2010–11	4	Tállya KSE	5 / 18	58
2011–12	4	Tállya KSE	4 / 18	73
2012–13	4	Tállya KSE	2 / 16	65
2013–14	4	Tállya KSE	1 / 16	72
2014–15	4	Tállya KSE	1 / 16	71
2015–16	3	Tállya KSE	13 / 17	25
2016–17	3	Tállya KSE	7 / 18	49
2017–18	3	Tállya KSE	13 / 16	29
2018–19	3	Tállya KSE	13 / 16	29
2019–20	3	Tállya KSE	12 / 16	18
2020–21	3	Tállya KSE	14 / 20	43
2021–22	3	Tállya KSE	19 / 20	21
2022–23	4	Tállya KSE	6 / 16	45
2023–24	4	Tállya KSE	13 / 16	35
2024–25	4	RSE Tállya	7 / 16	36
2025–26	4	RSE Tállya	10 / 16	38
