= Iváncsa KSE =

Hungarian football club

- Full name: Iváncsa Községi Sportegyesület
- Founded: 1920; 106 years ago
- Ground: Károlyi István Sporttelep
- Capacity: 750
- Manager: András Tóth
- League: NB III; Southwest
- 2023–24: NB III; Southwest, 2nd of 16
- Website: https://ivancsa-kse.hu/
Home colours

Iváncsa Községi Sportegyesület is a professional football club based in Iváncsa, Fejér County, Hungary, that competes in the Nemzeti Bajnokság III, the third tier of Hungarian football.

== History ==
Iváncsa is going to compete in the 2017–18 Nemzeti Bajnokság III.

On October 19, 2022. Iváncsa pulled off the greatest result in their history, as they upset the reigning champions and cup holders, Ferencváros, winning 3–2 after extra time in the last 32 of the 2022–23 Hungarian Cup.

On 28 May 2023, Iváncsa beat Kozármisleny SE 1–0 away in the first leg of the relegation playoff of the 2022–23 Nemzeti Bajnokság II season. However, the second leg was won by Kozármisleny 3–0; therefore, Iváncsa were not promoted to the second division.

== Honours ==
- Nemzeti Bajnokság III (Central group)
  - Winners (2): 2020–21, 2022–23
- Megyei Bajnokság I (Fejér megye)
  - Winners (5): 2011–12, 2013–14, 2014–15, 2015–16, 2016–17
  - Runners-up (1): 2010–11
- Megyei Bajnokság II (Fejér megye)
  - Winners (5): 1964, 1971–72, 1999–2000, 2002–03, 2009–10
  - Runners-up (1): 1997–98

== Seasons ==
The table below shows the seasons of Iváncsa KSE.

Season	Tier	Club's name	Position	Pts
1946–47	5	Iváncsai SE	0 / 8	
1947–48	5	Iváncsai SE	0 / 12	
1948–49	5	Iváncsai SE	11 / 14	9
1949–50	5	Iváncsa	0 / 12	
1950	5	Iváncsai DISz	3 / 8	10
1951	4	Iváncsai DISz	0 / 6	
1957–58	5	Iváncsa	11 / 12	4
1958–59	5	Iváncsa	9 / 14	13
1959–60	5	Iváncsa	6 / 14	17
1960–61	5	Iváncsa	8 / 16	30
1961–62	5	Iváncsa	11 / 11	11
1962–63	5	Iváncsa	11 / 14	16
1963	6	Iváncsa	6 / 12	6
1964	6	Iváncsa	1 / 16	39
1965	5	Iváncsa	12 / 18	26
1966	5	Iváncsa	8 / 14	24
1967	5	Iváncsa	10 / 16	28
1968	5	Iváncsa	13 / 14	12
1969	5	Iváncsa	13 / 14	4
1970	6	Iváncsa	7 / 14	12
1970–71	6	Iváncsa	4 / 16	30
1971–72	6	Iváncsa	1 / 16	39
1972–73	5	Iváncsai TSZ SK	15 / 16	9
1973–74	6	Iváncsa	16 / 16	12
1974–75	6	Iváncsa	8 / 14	23
1975–76	6	Iváncsa	2 / 14	39
1976–77	5	Iváncsa	9 / 17	32
1977–78	5	Iváncsa	10 / 14	21
1978–79	4	Iváncsa	6 / 16	21
1979–80	4	Iváncsa	1 / 14	39
1980–81	4	Iváncsa	7 / 12	17
1981–82	5	Iváncsa	1 / 8	24
1982–83	4	Iváncsa	10 / 16	29
1983–84	4	Iváncsai Sallai TSz SK	4 / 16	37
1984–85	4	Iváncsai Sallai TSZ SK	4 / 16	39
1985–86	4	Iváncsai Sallai TSZ SK	4 / 16	34
1986–87	4	Iváncsai Sallai TSZ SK	15 / 17	26
1987–88	5	Iváncsai Sallai TSZ SK	3 / 15	36
1988–89	4	Iváncsa	12 / 16	37
1989–90	4	Iváncsa	15 / 18	38
1990–91	4	Iváncsa	15 / 16	20
1991–92	5	Iváncsa	14 / 16	21
1992–93	5	Iváncsa	7 / 16	33
1993–94	5	Iváncsa	7 / 16	32
1994–95	5	Iváncsa	10 / 16	39
1995–96	5	Iváncsa	8 / 16	37
1996–97	5	Iváncsa	3 / 16	62
1997–98	6	Iváncsa	2 / 16	64
1998–99	5	Iváncsa	14 / 16	27
1999–00	6	Iváncsa	1 / 16	80
2000–01	5	Iváncsa	4 / 18	53
2001–02	5	Iváncsa	16 / 16	1
2002–03	6	Iváncsa	1 / 16	71
2003–04	5	Iváncsa	10 / 16	34
2004–05	5	Iváncsa	8 / 16	50
2005–06	4	Iváncsa	8 / 16	40
2006–07	4	Iváncsa	9 / 16	44
2007–08	4	Iváncsa	14 / 16	28
2008–09	5	Iváncsa	14 / 16	19
2009–10	5	Iváncsa KSK	1 / 16	79
2010–11	4	Iváncsa KSK	2 / 16	58
2011–12	4	KSE Iváncsa	1 / 16	75
2012–13	4	KSE Iváncsa	4 / 16	55
2013–14	4	KSE Iváncsa	1 / 16	82
2014–15	4	KSE Iváncsa	1 / 16	80
2015–16	4	KSE Iváncsa	1 / 16	78
2016–17	4	KSE Iváncsa	1 / 16	81
2017–18	3	KSE Iváncsa	3 / 16	60
2018–19	3	KSE Iváncsa	7 / 16	39
2019–20	3	KSE Iváncsa	4 / 16	35
2020–21	3	KSE Iváncsa	1 / 20	86
2021–22	3	KSE Iváncsa	7 / 20	62
2022–23	3	KSE Iváncsa	1 / 20	79
2023–24	3	KSE Iváncsa	2 / 16	74
2024–25	3	KSE Iváncsa	2 / 16	68
2025–26	3	KSE Iváncsa	9 / 16	39
