= Füzesgyarmati SK =

Hungarian football club

- Full name: Füzesgyarmati Sport Klub
- Founded: 1950; 76 years ago
- Ground: Lázár Gyula Sporttelep
- Capacity: 2,300
- General manager: Zsolt Márkus
- Manager: Tamás Szabados
- League: NB III
- 2022–23: NB III, East, 15th of 20
Home colours	Away colours

Füzesgyarmati Sport Klub is a professional football club based in Füzesgyarmat, Békés County, Hungary, that competes in the Megyei Bajnokság I, the third fourth of Hungarian football.

== History ==
Füzesgyarmati SK is going to compete in the 2019–20 Nemzeti Bajnokság III.

== Naming history ==
- Füzesgyarmati TE: ? - 1949
- Füzesgyarmati EPOSz: 1949 - 1950
- Füzesgyarmati DISz: 1950 - 1952
- Füzesgyarmati KSK: 1952 - 1957
- Füzesgyarmati MEDOSZ: 1957 - ?
- Füzesgyarmati TSZ SK: ? - ?
- Füzesgyarmati SK

== Players ==
=== First-team squad ===
As of 29 July 2020

Note: Flags indicate national team as defined under FIFA eligibility rules; some limited exceptions apply. Players may hold more than one non-FIFA nationality.

No.	Pos.	Nation	Player
—	GK	ROU	Călin Fildan (Captain)
—	MF	HUN	István Bartók
—	MF	ROU	István Bódis

No.	Pos.	Nation	Player
—	FW	HUN	Bence Szabó
—	FW	HUN	Szabolcs Kis
—	FW	ROU	Raul Sándor

== Club officials ==
=== Board of directors ===
Role	Name
General Manager	(Hungary) Zsolt Márkus

=== Current technical staff ===
Role	Name
Manager	(Hungary) Tibor Boros
Head coach	(Hungary) László Csillag
Assistant coaches	(Hungary) Zoltán Mazán (Romania) Sorin Cigan
Goalkeeping coach	(Hungary) Ferenc Vígh
Masseurs	(Hungary) Zsigmond Pap (Hungary) Zoltán Révész

== Seasons ==
As of 4 March 2026.

Season	Tier	Club's name	Position	Pts
1937–38	3	Füzesgyarmati TE	3 / 10	18
1946–47	4	Füzesgyarmati TE	0 / 12	
1947–48	4	Füzesgyarmati TE	7 / 13	22
1948–49	6	Füzesgyarmati TE	0 / 13	
1949–50	6	Füzesgyarmati EPOSz	1 / 7	16
1950	5	Füzesgyarmati DISz	8 / 12	9
1951	4	Füzesgyarmati DISz	0 / 6	
1952	4	Füzesgyarmati KSK	0 / 13	
1953	4	Füzesgyarmati SK	5 / 10	7
1955	5	Füzesgyarmati FSK	1 / 6	16
1957–58	5	Füzesgyarmati MEDOSZ	4 / 16	36
1958–59	5	Füzesgyarmat	1 / 10	21
1959–60	5	Füzesgyarmat	7 / 18	36
1960–61	5	Füzesgyarmat	13 / 16	16
1962–63	6	Füzesgyarmat	1 / 9	36
1963	6	Füzesgyarmat	12 / 14	2
1964	6	Füzesgyarmat	11 / 14	7
1965	6	Füzesgyarmat	8 / 16	29
1966	6	Füzesgyarmat	9 / 14	22
1967	6	Füzesgyarmat	4 / 12	27
1968	6	Füzesgyarmat	3 / 11	30
1969	6	Füzesgyarmat	8 / 12	18
1970	6	Füzesgyarmat	4 / 8	13
1970–71	6	Füzesgyarmat	13 / 16	24
1971–72	6	Füzesgyarmat	3 / 16	40
1972–73	6	Füzesgyarmat	1 / 16	47
1973–74	5	Füzesgyarmat	11 / 18	32
1974–75	4	Füzesgyarmat	9 / 16	23
1975–76	4	Füzesgyarmat	4 / 16	36
1976–77	4	Füzesgyarmat	3 / 16	40
1977–78	4	Füzesgyarmat	14 / 17	28
1978–79	3	Füzesgyarmat	4 / 18	38
1979–80	3	Füzesgyarmat	13 / 18	28
1980–81	3	Füzesgyarmat	5 / 18	44
1981–82	3	Füzesgyarmat	8 / 16	29
1982–83	3	Füzesgyarmat	15 / 16	10
1983–84	4	Fűzesgyarmati TSZ SK	7 / 16	32
1984–85	4	Füzesgyarmat	10 / 16	27
1985–86	4	Füzesgyarmat	6 / 16	32
1986–87	4	Füzesgyarmat	12 / 16	25
1987–88	4	Füzesgyarmat	15 / 16	18
1988–89	4	Füzesgyarmat	7 / 16	44
1989–90	4	Füzesgyarmat	4 / 16	33
1990–91	4	Füzesgyarmat	11 / 16	27
1991–92	4	Füzesgyarmat	7 / 16	31
1992–93	4	Füzesgyarmat	14 / 16	23
1993–94	4	Füzesgyarmat	7 / 16	31
1994–95	4	Füzesgyarmat TSZ SK	16 / 16	21
1995–96	5	Füzesgyarmat TSZ SK	3 / 16	62
1996–97	4	Füzesgyarmat	9 / 18	49
1997–98	5	Füzegyarmat	5 / 18	57
1998–99	5	Füzesgyarmat	6 / 16	50
1999–00	5	Füzesgyarmat	14 / 16	30
2000–01	6	Füzesgyarmat	2 / 16	57
2001–02	5	Füzesgyarmat	16 / 16	23
2002–03	6	Füzesgyarmat	9 / 16	37
2003–04	6	Füzesgyarmat	12 / 16	32
2004–05	6	Füzesgyarmat	5 / 16	58
2005–06	5	Füzesgyarmati SK	1 / 16	81
2006–07	4	Füzesgyarmati SK	8 / 16	43
2007–08	4	Füzesgyarmati SK	16 / 16	23
2008–09	5	Füzesgyarmati SK	7 / 16	50
2009–10	5	Füzesgyarmati SK	1 / 16	72
2010–11	4	Füzesgyarmati SK	11 / 15	30
2011–12	4	Füzesgyarmati SK	2 / 16	64
2012–13	4	Füzesgyarmati SK	4 / 16	50
2013–14	4	Füzesgyarmati SK	5 / 16	51
2014–15	4	Füzesgyarmati SK	3 / 16	64
2015–16	4	Füzesgyarmati SK	4 / 15	52
2016–17	4	Füzesgyarmati SK	1 / 13	66
2017–18	3	Füzesgyarmati SK	8 / 16	36
2018–19	3	Füzesgyarmati SK	4 / 16	55
2019–20	3	Füzesgyarmati SK	2 / 16	38
2020–21	3	Füzesgyarmati SK	4 / 20	72
2021–22	3	Füzesgyarmati SK	10 / 20	51
2022–23	3	Füzesgyarmati SK	15 / 20	47
2023–24	3	Füzesgyarmati SK	15 / 16	24
2024–25	4	Füzesgyarmati SK	9 / 12	29
2025–26	4	Füzesgyarmati SK	10 / 11	11
