= Csornai SE =

Hungarian football club

- Full name: Csornai Sportegyesület
- Founded: 1910
- Ground: Kocsis István Sporttelep
- Capacity: 760
- League: NB III
- 2022–23: NB III, West, 17th of 20
Home colours	Away colours

Csornai Sport Egyesület is a professional football club based in Csorna, Győr-Moson-Sopron County, Hungary, that competes in the Nemzeti Bajnokság III, the third tier of Hungarian football.

== Fans ==
The team has a march song produced by EVE SIX.

== Seasons ==
As of 20 October 2026.

Season	Tier	Club's name	Position	Pts
1926–27	3	Csornai SE	4 / 6	7
1927–28	3	Rábaközi SE	11 / 11	6
1930–31	3	Csornai SE	3 / 10	10
1931–32	3	Csornai SE	2 / 11	26
1932–33	3	Csornai SE	9 / 11	9
1933–34	3	Csornai SE	0 / 8	
1934–35	3	Csornai SE	0 / 11	
1935–36	3	Csornai SE	0 / 7	
1941–42	5	Csornai KLE	5 / 9	18
1942–43	5	Csornai KLE	2 / 9	23
1943–44	5	Csornai KLE	1 / 10	29
1944–45	3	Csornai KLE	0 / 10	
1945	2	Csornai SE	6 / 7	2
1946–47	5	Csornai SE A	4 / 6	10
1947–48	5	Csornai SE A	1 / 12	37
1948–49	4	Csornai SE	15 / 16	22
1949–50	4	Csornai SzSE	4 / 15	36
1950	4	Csornai SzSE	2 / 14	16
1951	3	Csornai Kinizsi	12 / 12	14
1952	3	Csornai Kinizsi	8 / 14	23
1953	3	Csornai Kinizsi	8 / 12	23
1954	3	Csornai Traktor	3 / 12	33
1955	3	Csornai Traktor	5 / 14	29
1956	3	Csornai Traktor	13 / 16	20
1957	3	Csornai SE	4 / 6	10
1957–58	4	Csornai SE	8 / 16	30
1958–59	4	Csornai SE	14 / 16	22
1959–60	4	Csornai SE	14 / 17	19
1960–61	5	Csornai SE	2 / 14	
1961–62	5	Csorna	1 / 4	
1962–63	4	Csorna MEDOSZ SK	14 / 17	14
1963	5	Csornai SE	4 / 8	15
1964	5	Csorna	9 / 16	29
1965	5	Csorna	12 / 16	22
1966	5	Csorna	11 / 16	25
1967	5	Csorna	8 / 16	30
1968	5	Csornai SE	14 / 16	20
1969	5	Csornai SE	11 / 16	25
1970	5	Csornai SE	13 / 16	10
1970–71	5	Csornai SE	8 / 16	29
1971–72	5	Csorna	10 / 16	26
1972–73	5	Csorna	3 / 14	32
1973–74	5	Csornai SE	4 / 14	35
1974–75	4	Csornai SE	7 / 16	37
1975–76	4	Csorna	2 / 16	45
1976–77	4	Csornai SE	2 / 18	51
1977–78	4	Csornai SE	4 / 18	47
1978–79	3	Csorna	5 / 18	41
1979–80	3	Csornai SE	1 / 18	60
1980–81	3	Csornai SE	4 / 18	48
1981–82	3	Csornai SE	15 / 18	24
1982–83	4	Csornai SE	10 / 16	27
1983–84	4	Csorna	13 / 16	23
1984–85	4	Csorna	3 / 16	37
1985–86	4	Csorna	5 / 16	40
1986–87	4	Csornai SE	2 / 16	41
1987–88	4	Csornai SE	4 / 16	37
1988–89	4	Csorna	4 / 16	39
1989–90	4	Csorna	3 / 16	51
1990–91	4	Csornai SE	8 / 16	33
1991–92	4	Csorna	7 / 16	31
1992–93	4	Csorna	6 / 16	33
1993–94	4	Csorna	1 / 16	56
1994–95	3	Csorna-Riegler SE	2 / 16	54
1995–96	3	Csorna-Riegler SE	2 / 16	66
1996–97	3	Csornai SE	7 / 16	51
1997–98	4	Csorna	2 / 16	65
1998–99	4	Csornai SE	8 / 16	37
1999–00	4	Csornai SE	12 / 16	30
2000–01	5	Csorna	3 / 18	77
2001–02	4	Csorna SE	8 / 14	33
2002–03	4	Csorna SE	7 / 16	47
2003–04	4	Csorna	6 / 16	49
2004–05	4	Csorna	3 / 14	45
2005–06	3	Csornai SE	4 / 16	51
2006–07	3	Csornai SE	11 / 14	25
2007–08	3	Csornai SE	6 / 18	56
2008–09	3	Csornai SE	13 / 16	32
2009–10	3	Csornai SE	6 / 14	44
2010–11	3	Csornai SE	9 / 16	37
2011–12	3	Csornai SE	3 / 15	60
2012–13	3	Csornai SE	9 / 14	31
2013–14	4	Csornai SE	2 / 16	61
2014–15	4	Csornai SE	1 / 16	67
2015–16	3	Csornai SE	15 / 17	21
2016–17	3	Csornai SE	5 / 18	54
2017–18	3	Csornai SE	14 / 16	26
2018–19	4	Csornai SE	2 / 16	75
2019–20	4	Csornai SE	2 / 16	46
2020–21	4	Csornai SE	2 / 16	74
2021–22	4	Csornai SE	1 / 16	79
2022–23	3	Csornai SE	17 / 20	27
2023–24	3	Csornai SE	16 / 16	19
2024–25	4	Csornai SE	4 / 16	60
2025–26	4	Csornai SE	11 / 14	20
