= Érdi VSE =

Hungarian football club

- Full name: Érdi Városi Sportegyesület
- Founded: 1921; 105 years ago
- Ground: Ercsi úti Pálya; Érd, Hungary
- Capacity: 3,500
- Chairman: István Tiba
- Coach: Ferenc Novák
- League: NB III
- 2022–23: NB III, West, 6th of 20
- Website: https://erdivse.hu/
Home colours	Away colours

Érdi VSE is a Hungarian football club located in Érd, Hungary. It currently plays in Nemzeti Bajnokság III. The team's colors are green and white.

== History ==
On 16 June 2020, Érd official withdrew from the participation in the Nemzeti Bajnokság II, although they finished first in the 2019-20 Nemzeti Bajnokság III season which was abandoned due to the COVID-19 pandemic. Instead of Érd, Szentlőrinci SE will participate in the 2020-21 Nemzeti Bajnokság II season, while Érd will participate in the 2020-21 Nemzeti Bajnokság III season.

== Honours ==
- Nemzeti Bajnokság III:
  - Winners (4): 1981–82, 1994–95, 2011–12, 2019–20

== Seasons ==
The table below shows the seasons of Érdi VSE.

Season	Tier	Club's name	Position	Pts
1922–23	3	Érdi SC	0 / 10	
1923–24	3	Érdi SC	7 / 7	5
1933–34	3	Érdi KK	1 / 12	
1934–35	3	Érdi KK	0 / 10	
1935–36	4	Érdi KK	2 / 8	15
1936–37	3	Érdi KK	7 / 10	10
1937–38	3	Érdi PLE	7 / 11	17
1939–40	4	Érdi PLE	2 / 14	40
1940–41	4	Érdi PLE	9 / 14	24
1941–42	4	Érdi PLE	10 / 12	13
1942–43	4	Érdi PLE	6 / 9	14
1943–44	4	Érdi PLE	1 / 12	32
1944–45	2	Érdi PLE	16 / 16	2
1944–45	3	Érdi PLE	0 / 12	
1945–46	2	Érdi PLE	1 / 12	
1946–47	2	Érdi MÁV	14 / 14	-
1947–48	3	Érdi Vasutas SC	16 / 16	-
1948–49	5	Érdi MTE	3 / 12	26
1949–50	5	Érdi SzIT SE	1 / 12	35
1950	4	Érdi DISz	3 / 13	16
1951	3	Érdi Vasas	3 / 14	33
1952	3	Érdi Vasas	6 / 14	29
1953	3	Érdi SK	16 / 16	12
1957	4	Érdi Traktor	5 / 10	19
1957–58	5	Érdi Traktor	1 / 16	50
1958–59	5	Érdi Traktor	2 / 14	40
1959–60	4	Érdi Traktor	11 / 16	27
1960–61	4	Érdi Traktor	17 / 18	21
1961–62	5	Érdi Traktor	4 / 14	29
1962–63	5	Érdi Traktor	8 / 14	27
1963	6	Érdi Traktor	14 / 14	8
1964	6	Érdi MEDOSZ	6 / 13	27
1965	6	Érdi MEDOSZ	8 / 14	24
1966	6	Érd	2 / 14	36
1967	5	Érd	4 / 16	37
1968	5	Érd	16 / 16	11
1969	6	Érd	13 / 16	22
1970	7	Érdi MEDOSZ	0 / 9	
1970–71	7	Érdi MEDOSZ	7 / 10	11
1971–72	7	Érdi MEDOSZ	1 / 16	48
1972–73	6	Érd	5 / 16	35
1973–74	6	Érd	3 / 16	35
1974–75	5	Érdi MEDOSZ	1 / 12	36
1975–76	4	Érd	13 / 16	24
1976–77	4	Érd	13 / 16	24
1977–78	4	Érdi KSK	14 / 16	23
1978–79	4	Érdi SE	1 / 16	59
1979–80	3	Érdi Városi SE	4 / 18	47
1980–81	3	Érdi Városi SE	3 / 18	48
1981–82	3	Érdi VSE	1 / 18	48
1982–83	3	Érdi VSE	8 / 18	32
1983–84	3	Érdi VSE	8 / 18	38
1984–85	3	Érdi VSE	10 / 18	37
1985–86	3	Érdi VSE	9 / 18	34
1986–87	3	Érdi VSE	12 / 18	31
1987–88	3	Érdi VSE	12 / 18	25
1988–89	3	Érdi Városi SE	7 / 16	46
1989–90	3	Érdi VSE	5 / 16	52
1990–91	3	Érdi VSE	12 / 16	26
1991–92	3	Érdi VSE	2 / 16	42
1992–93	3	Érdi VSE	2 / 16	41
1993–94	3	Érdi VSE	2 / 16	36
1994–95	3	Érdi VSE	1 / 16	72
1995–96	2	Érdi VSE	11 / 16	33
1996–97	2	Érdi VSE	3 / 16	51
1997–98	2	Érdi VSE	5 / 20	60
1998–99	2	Érdi Sport	8 / 20	57
2000–01	7	Érd	1 / 10	65
2001–02	6	Érd	2 / 16	57
2002–03	6	Érd	3 / 16	67
2003–04	6	Érd	8 / 16	46
2004–05	6	Érd	5 / 18	68
2005–06	5	Érdi VSE	1 / 14	58
2006–07	4	Érdi VSE	9 / 16	43
2007–08	4	Érdi VSE	3 / 16	68
2008–09	3	Érdi VSE	8 / 16	46
2009–10	3	Érdi VSE	3 / 14	53
2010–11	3	Érdi VSE	10 / 16	42
2011–12	3	Érdi Városi SE	1 / 16	75
2012–13	3	Érdi VSE	8 / 15	40
2013–14	4	Érdi Városi SE	2 / 16	68
2014–15	4	Érdi VSE	1 / 16	70
2015–16	3	Érdi VSE	10 / 17	44
2016–17	3	Érdi VSE	2 / 18	72
2017–18	3	Érdi VSE	3 / 16	57
2018–19	3	Érdi VSE	2 / 16	59
2019–20	3	Érdi VSE	1 / 16	42
2020–21	3	Érdi VSE	10 / 20	54
2021–22	3	Érdi VSE	14 / 20	46
2022–23	3	Érdi VSE	6 / 20	65
2023–24	3	Érdi VSE	9 / 16	32
2024–25	3	Érdi VSE	9 / 16	43
2025–26	3	Érdi VSE	7 / 16	52
