= Körösladány =

- Town
- Flag Coat of arms

- Location within Hungary
- Coordinates: 46.964°N 21.079°E
- Country: Hungary
- County: Békés
- District: Szeghalom

Area
  - Total: 123.87 km^{2} (47.83 sq mi)

Population (2015)
  - Total: 4,557
  - Density: 36.8/km^{2} (95/sq mi)
- Time zone: UTC+1 (CET)
  - Summer (DST): UTC+2 (CEST)
- Postal code: 5516
- Area code: (+36) 66
- Website: www.korosladany.hu

Körösladány is a town in Békés County, in the Southern Great Plain region of south-east Hungary. Körösladány is located along the Sebes-Körös.

Béla Wenckheim, a Hungarian politician, who served as the Prime Minister of Hungary in 1875, was born here.

Jews lived in the city in the 19th and 20th centuries until the German Nazis destroyed the Jewish community in the Holocaust.

== Geography ==
It covers an area of 123.87 km^{2} and has a population of 4557 people (2015).

== Politics ==
The current mayor of Körösladány is Károly Kardos (Fidesz-KDNP).

The local Municipal Assembly has 6+1 members divided into this political parties and alliances:

Party	Seats	2014 Council
Independent	4	
Fidesz-KDNP	1	
Movement for a Better Hungary (Jobbik)	1	
