= Bátaszéki SE =

Hungarian football club

- Full name: Bátaszéki Sport Egyesület
- Founded: 1911; 114 years ago
- Ground: Vicze János Városi Sportpálya
Home colours	Away colours

Bátaszéki Sport Egyesület is a professional football club based in Bátaszék, Tolna County, Hungary. The club competes in the Tolna county league.

== Name changes ==
- 1945–1949: Bátaszéki Vasutas SE
- 1949–1951: Bátaszéki Vasutas Sport Kör
- 1951–1955: Bátaszéki Lokomotív Sport Kör
- 1955–1957: Bátaszéki Törekvés
- 1957–1979: Bátaszéki Vasutas Sport Kör
- 1979–?: Bátaszéki Szövetkezeti Vasutas SE
- ?-?: Bátaszéki SE
- 1996–present: Bátaszék SE
