= Komárom VSE =

Hungarian football club

- Full name: Komárom Városi Sportegyesület
- Founded: 1947; 79 years ago
- Ground: Újkomáromi Sporttelep
- Capacity: 4,132
- Manager: Gábor Nagy
- League: NB III
- 2022–23: NB III, West, 12th of 20
- Website: https://kvse.hu/
Home colours

Komárom Városi Sportegyesület is a professional football club based in Komárom, Komárom-Esztergom County, Hungary, that competes in the Nemzeti Bajnokság III, the third tier of Hungarian Football.

== Name changes ==
- 1947–1949: Szőnyi MOLAJ FC
- 1949–1951: Szőnyi MASZOLAJ Lombik
- 1951–1952: Szőnyi Szikra
- 1952–1957: Szőnyi MASZOLAJ Szikra
- 1957–1960: Szőnyi MOLAJ SE
- 1960–1962: Szőnyi Olajmunkás
- 1962–1998: Komáromi Olajmunkás SE
- 1967: merger with Komárom Textil
- 1998–2000: MOLAJ SE
- 2000–present: Komárom VSE

== Honours ==
=== League ===
- Nemzeti Bajnokság III:
  - Winners (1): 1997–98
- Megyei Bajnokság I: (4th level)
  - Winners (5): 1952, 1981–82, 2011–12, 2015–16, 2017–18
