= Jászberényi FC =

Hungarian football club

- Full name: Jászberényi Futball Club
- Founded: 2012; 14 years ago
- Ground: Jászberényi Városi Stadion
- Capacity: 4,500
- League: MB I Jász-Nagykun-Szolnok
- 2022–23: NB III; East, 20th of 20 (relegated)
Home colours

Jászberényi Futball Club is a professional football club based in Jászberény, Jász-Nagykun-Szolnok County, Hungary, that competes in the Megyei Bajnokság I – Jász-Nagykun-Szolnok, the fourth tier of Hungarian football.

== Name changes ==
- 2012–14: Nagyiváni Községi és Jászberényi Sportegyesület és Futball Club
- 2014–present: Jászberényi Futball Club

== Honours and achievements ==
=== League ===
- Nemzeti Bajnokság III (level 3)
  - Runners-up (1): 2018–19

=== County Leagues (Jász-Nagykun-Szolnok) ===
- Megyei Bajnokság I (level 4)
  - Winners (1): 2013–14

=== County Cups ===
- Jász-Nagykun-Szolnok County Cup
  - Winners (1): 2012–13

== Current squad ==
As of 5 November 2020.

Note: Flags indicate national team as defined under FIFA eligibility rules; some limited exceptions apply. Players may hold more than one non-FIFA nationality.

No.	Pos.	Nation	Player
7	FW	HUN	Ádám Albert
8	DF	HUN	Márk Micskó
9	FW	HUN	Szabolcs Nagy
10	MF	HUN	Ferenc Szöllősi
11	MF	HUN	Péter Gergely
12	DF	HUN	Attila Sütő
13	DF	HUN	Patrik Papp
14	FW	HUN	Gergő Pálinkás
17	FW	HUN	Olivér Fekete
19	FW	ROU	László Hodgyai
20	DF	HUN	Márk Fekete

No.	Pos.	Nation	Player
21	MF	HUN	Martin Palcsó
22	DF	HUN	Attila Torkos
23	GK	HUN	Márk Csutorka
29	DF	HUN	Krisztián Szanyi
30	GK	ROU	Sebastian Bonica
32	DF	HUN	Krisztián László
77	MF	HUN	Attila Lőrincz
88	MF	HUN	Gábor Kurunczi
89	DF	HUN	Mózes Aranyos
94	DF	HUN	Balázs Szemere
—	DF	HUN	Milán Drávucz
