= Dabas–Gyón FC =

Hungarian football club

- Full name: Dabas–Gyón Football Club
- Founded: 2008
- Dissolved: 2025
- Ground: Tatárszentgyörgyi út
- Capacity: 2,200
- League: Nemzeti Bajnokság III
Home colours

Dabas–Gyón Football Club is a defunct professional football club based in Dabas, Pest County, Hungary, that competes in the Nemzeti Bajnokság III, the third tier of Hungarian football.

== Name changes ==
- Gyóni KSK: ? - ?
- Dabas III. ker.: ? - ?
- Dabas-Gyón FC: 2006? -

== Seasons ==
As of 20 October 2026.

Season	Tier	Club's name	Position	Pts
1949–50	6	Gyón	0 / 10	
1950	6	Gyón	8 / 8	-
1957–58	6	Gyón	8 / 8	1
1961–62	6	Gyón	7 / 12	21
1962–63	6	Gyóni KSK	2 / 10	22
1963	7	Gyón	6 / 10	8
1964	7	Gyón	8 / 13	24
1965	7	Gyón	8 / 10	15
1966	7	Gyón	3 / 12	29
1967	6	Dabas III. ker.	11 / 14	22
1968	6	Dabas III. ker.	9 / 14	27
1969	7	Dabas III. ker.	4 / 13	31
1970	7	Dabas III. ker.	4 / 7	9
2006–07	6	Dabas-Gyón	2 / 14	63
2007–08	7	Dabas-Gyón	1 / 10	61
2008–09	6	Dabas-Gyón FC	2 / 10	69
2009–10	6	Dabas-Gyón FC	5 / 14	49
2010–11	6	Dabas-Gyón FC	1 / 13	63
2011–12	5	Dabas-Gyón FC	4 / 15	50
2012–13	5	Dabas-Gyón FC	2 / 16	64
2013–14	5	Dabas-Gyón FC	2 / 15	75
2014–15	4	Dabas-Gyón FC	3 / 16	60
2015–16	4	Dabas-Gyón FC	1 / 16	77
2016–17	3	Dabas-Gyón FC	16 / 18	31
2017–18	4	Dabas-Gyón FC	2 / 16	61
2018–19	4	Dabas-Gyón FC	1 / 16	68
2019–20	3	Dabas-Gyón FC	9 / 16	25
2020–21	3	Dabas-Gyón FC	9 / 20	55
2021–22	3	Dabas-Gyón FC	18 / 20	30
2022–23	6	Dabas-Gyón FC	9 / 14	21
2023–24	6	Dabas-Gyón FC	8 / 14	33
2024–25	6	Dabas-Gyón FC	8 / 14	33
