= Bicskei TC =

Hungarian football club

Bicske
- Full name: Bicskei Torna Club
- Founded: 1912; 114 years ago
- Ground: Bicskei Sportpálya
- League: NB III
- 2022–23: NB III, West, 7th of 20
- Website: https://www.bicskeitc.com/
Home colours

Bicskei Torna Club is a professional football club based in Bicske, Fejér county, Hungary, that competes in the Nemzeti Bajnokság III, the third tier of Hungarian football.

== History ==
Bicskei TC was established by Gyula Prockl in 1912.

On 28 October 2026, Bicskei TC hosted Ferencváros in the round of 32 of the 2026–27 Magyar Kupa season. The match ended with a 4–1 victory for Ferencváros. The only goal for Bicske was scored by Patrik Király.

== Honours ==
=== League ===
- Megyei Bajnokság I:
  - Winners (1): 2018–19

== Seasons ==
The table below shows the seasons of Bicskei TC.

As of 30 October 2026.

Season	Tier	Club's name	Position	Pts
1935–36	4	Bicskei TC	5 / 8	8
1936–37	4	Bicskei TC	2 / 9	23
1937–38	4	Bicskei TC	7 / 7	9
1943–44	4	Bicskei TC	12 / 14	15
1944–45	3	Bicskei TC	11 / 14	4
1946–47	4	Bicskei TC	0 / 14	
1947–48	4	Bicskei Iparos SE	0 / 14	
1948–49	5	Bicskei Iparos SE	7 / 12	20
1949–50	5	Bicskei Iparos SE	9 / 12	15
1950	5	Bicskei Iparos SE	7 / 11	8
1951	4	Bicskei Vasas	1 / 6	
1952	3	Bicskei Vasas SK	9 / 14	18
1953	3	Bicskei Vasas	7 / 16	29
1954	3	Bicskei KSK	0 / 16	16
1957	5	Bicske	3 / 7	14
1957–58	5	Bicskei TC	1 / 12	20
1958–59	4	Bicskei TC	11 / 16	26
1959–60	4	Bicskei TC	4 / 16	32
1960–61	4	Bicskei TC	5 / 16	29
1961–62	4	Bicske	5 / 16	29
1962–63	4	Bicskei TC	12 / 16	13
1963 ősz	5	Bicske	14 / 19	9
1964	5	Bicske	14 / 17	24
1965	5	Bicske	8 / 18	34
1966	5	Bicske	3 / 14	32
1967	5	Bicskei TC	9 / 16	25
1968	5	Bicske	8 / 14	21
1969	5	Bicske	6 / 14	25
1970 tavasz	5	Bicskei TC	11 / 16	
1970–71	5	Bicskei TC	12 / 17	23
1971–72	5	Bicske	5 / 16	37
1972–73	5	Bicskei TC	5 / 16	41
1973–74	5	Bicskei TC	9 / 16	27
1974–75	4	Bicskei TC	7 / 18	38
1975–76	4	Bicskei Spartacus	8 / 18	35
1976–77	4	Bicskei Spartacus TC	5 / 18	42
1977–78	4	Bicskei Spartacus TC	7 / 16	32
1978–79	3	Bicskei Spartacus TC	13 / 16	23
1979–80	3	Bicskei Spartacus TC	15 / 16	20
1980–81	4	Bicskei Spartacus TC	4 / 12	23
1981–82	5	Bicske	2 / 10	27
1982–83	5	Bicskei Spartacus TC	4 / 12	22
1983–84	5	Bicske	2 / 11	33
1984–85	5	Bicske	1 / 12	40
1985–86	5	Bicske	1 / 9	30
1986–87	4	Bicskei TC	17 / 17	19
1987–88	5	Bicske	6 / 15	30
1988–89	5	Bicske	8 / 16	40
1989–90	5	Bicske	5 / 16	51
1990–91	5	Bicske	11 / 16	27
1991–92	5	Bicske	4 / 16	35
1992–93	5	Bicske	3 / 16	40
1993–94	4	Bicskei TC	1 / 16	39
1994–95	3	Bicskei TC	8 / 16	40
1995–96	3	Bicskei TC	12 / 16	32
1996–97	6	Bicske Pro Coop	3 / 16	65
1997–98	7	Bicskei TC	1 / 15	81
1998–99	6	Bicske	1 / 16	69
1999–00	5	Bicske	10 / 16	38
2000–01	5	Bicske	5 / 18	50
2001–02	5	Bicske	14 / 16	32
2002–03	5	Bicske	5 / 16	47
2003–04	5	Bicske	8 / 16	44
2004–05	5	Bicske	2 / 16	67
2005–06	4	Bicske	11 / 16	32
2006–07	4	Bicske	5 / 16	48
2007–08	4	Bicske	3 / 16	66
2008–09	4	Bicske	4 / 16	62
2009–10	4	Bicskei TC	2 / 16	66
2010–11	3	Bicskei TC	5 / 16	46
2011–12	3	Bicskei TC	14 / 16	28
2012–13	4	Bicskei TC	5 / 16	52
2013–14	4	Bicskei TC	5 / 16	45
2014–15	4	Bicskei TC	16 / 16	2
2015–16	4	Bicskei TC	10 / 16	34
2016–17	4	Bicskei TC	2 / 16	73
2017–18	4	Bicskei TC	3 / 14	59
2018–19	4	Bicskei TC	1 / 16	72
2019–20	3	Bicskei TC	10 / 16	22
2020–21	3	Bicskei TC	12 / 20	50
2021–22	3	Bicskei TC	6 / 20	62
2022–23	3	Bicskei TC	7 / 20	63
2023–24	3	Bicskei TC	2 / 16	63
2024–25	3	Bicskei TC	2 / 16	65
2025–26	3	Bicskei TC	10 / 16	36
