= FC Hatvan =

Hungarian football club

- Full name: Futball Club Hatvan
- Founded: 1992
- Ground: Népkert Sporttelep
- Capacity: 1,200
- Manager: Zoltán Szabó
- League: NB III; Northeast
- 2023–24: NB III; Northeast, 12th of 16
- Website: https://fchatvan.hu/
Home colours

Futball Club Hatvan is a professional football club based in Hatvan, Heves County, Hungary, that competes in the Nemzeti Bajnokság III – Northeast, the third tier of Hungarian football.

== History ==
On 26 August 2023, they were eliminated by Debreceni EAC in the third round of the 2023–24 Magyar Kupa season. The match ended with a 4–0 defeat at the Debreceni Egyetemi AC Stadion.

On 14 September 2024, they were eliminated by Zalaegerszegi TE from the 2024–25 Magyar Kupa season. The match ended with a 4–0 defeat at the Népkert Sporttelep.

== Name changes ==
- ?–1950: Hatvani Cukorgyári SE
- 1950–51: Hatvani ÉDOSz
- 1951–80: Hatvani Kinizsi SK
- 1980: merger with Hatvan Spartacus SK
- 1980–90: Hatvani Kinizsi Vasutas Sport Club
- 1990–91: Hatvani DEKO SE
- 1991–92: Hatvani Kinizsi Vasutas Sport Club
- 1992–present: Futball Club Hatvan

== Honours ==
- Nemzeti Bajnokság II:
  - Runners-up (1): 1993–94
- Nemzeti Bajnokság III:
  - Winners (2): 1987–88, 1989–90

== Seasons ==
The table below shows the seasons of FC Hatvan.

Season	Tier	Club's name	Position	Pts
1939–40	4	Hatvani Cukorgyár SE	7 / 10	16
1940–41	4	Hatvani Cukorgyári SE	10 / 10	2
1941–42	5	Hatvani Cukorgyári SE	0 / 12	
1947–48	5	Hatvani Cukorgyári SE	1 / 13	
1948–49	4	Hatvani Cukorgyár	6 / 16	
1949–50	4	Hatvani Cukorgyár	5 / 18	44
1950	4	Hatvani ÉDOSz	0 / 16	
1951	3	Hatvani Kinizsi	10 / 16	27
1952	3	Hatvani Kinizsi	7 / 14	24
1953	3	Hatvani Kinizsi	4 / 16	39
1954	3	Hatvani Kinizsi	7 / 16	35
1955	3	Hatvani Kinizsi	9 / 14	18
1956	3	Hatvani Kinizsi	8 / 14	23
1957	3	Hatvani Kinizsi SK	7 / 8	7
1957–58	4	Hatvani Kinizsi	10 / 16	29
1958–59	4	Hatvani Kinizsi	9 / 16	28
1959–60	4	Hatvani Kinizsi	9 / 16	26
1960–61	4	Hatvani Kinizsi	10 / 16	25
1961–62	4	Hatvani Kinizsi	4 / 16	34
1962–63	4	Hatvani Kinizsi	2 / 18	43
1963	5	Hatvani Kinizsi	3 / 18	26
1964	5	Hatvani Kinizsi	1 / 18	50
1965	4	Hatvani Kinizsi	12 / 16	27
1966	4	Hatvani Kinizsi	14 / 16	24
1967	4	Hatvani Kinizsi	8 / 16	29
1968	4	Hatvani Kinizsi	12 / 16	28
1969	4	Hatvani Kinizsi	7 / 16	32
1970	4	Hatvani Kinizsi	16 / 16	9
1970–71	4	Hatvani Kinizsi	13 / 16	26
1971–72	4	Hatvani Kinizsi	7 / 16	32
1972–73	4	Hatvani Kinizsi	4 / 16	38
1973–74	4	Hatvani Kinizsi	14 / 16	17
1974–75	4	Hatvani Kinizsi	6 / 18	33
1975–76	4	Hatvani Kinizsi	1 / 18	55
1976–77	3	Hatvani Kinizsi	18 / 20	25
1977–78	4	Hatvani Kinizsi	3 / 18	52
1978–79	3	Hatvani Kinizsi	3 / 18	49
1979–80	3	Hatvani Kinizsi	2 / 16	48
1980–81	3	Hatvani KVSC	1 / 16	51
1981–82	3	Hatvani KVSC	2 / 16	43
1982–83	3	Hatvani KVSC	3 / 16	40
1983–84	3	Hatvani KVSC	5 / 16	32
1984–85	3	Hatvani KVSC	2 / 16	38
1985–86	3	Hatvani KVSC	7 / 17	33
1986–87	3	Hatvani KVSC	11 / 16	30
1987–88	3	Hatvan KVSC	1 / 16	43
1988–89	2	Hatvani KVSC	15 / 16	27
1989–90	3	Hatvani KVSC-Deko	1 / 16	65
1990–91	2	Hatvani DEKO SE	13 / 16	23
1991–92	2	Hatvani KVSC-DEKO	6 / 16	34
1992–93	2	FC Hatvan	2 / 16	35
1993–94	2	FC Hatvan	2 / 16	38
1994–95	2	FC Hatvan	10 / 16	40
1995–96	2	FC Hatvan	10 / 16	34
1996–97	2	FC Hatvan	10 / 16	36
1997–98	3	FC Hatvan	14 / 16	27
1998–99	3	FC Hatvan	8 / 16	36
1999–00	3	FC Hatvan	12 / 16	23
2000–01	5	FC Hatvan	14 / 16	24
2001–02	5	FC Hatvan	5 / 16	53
2002–03	5	FC Hatvan	5 / 16	54
2003–04	5	FC Hatvan	4 / 16	55
2004–05	5	FC Hatvan	4 / 16	57
2005–06	4	FC Hatvan	5 / 16	56
2006–07	4	FC Hatvan	4 / 16	64
2007–08	4	FC Hatvan	5 / 16	46
2008–09	4	FC Hatvan	7 / 16	45
2009–10	4	FC Hatvan	3 / 16	57
2010–11	4	FC Hatvan	3 / 15	55
2011–12	3	FC Hatvan	13 / 15	25
2012–13	3	FC Hatvan	2 / 14	56
2013–14	3	FC Hatvan	9 / 16	40
2014–15	3	FC Hatvan	3 / 16	51
2015–16	3	FC Hatvan	5 / 17	55
2016–17	3	FC Hatvan	16 / 18	40
2017–18	4	FC Hatvan	2 / 16	73
2018–19	4	FC Hatvan	1 / 16	84
2019–20	3	FC Hatvan	14 / 16	10
2020–21	3	FC Hatvan	18 / 20	38
2021–22	4	FC Hatvan	1 / 16	77
2022–23	3	FC Hatvan	11 / 20	49
2023–24	3	FC Hatvan	12 / 16	36
2024–25	3	FC Hatvan	14 / 16	30
2025–26	3	FC Hatvan	16 / 16	16

== Managers ==
- Tamás Nagy (2017–2018)
