= Hódmezővásárhelyi FC =

Hungarian football club

- Full name: Hódmezővásárhelyi Futball Club
- Founded: 1996; 30 years ago
- Ground: Városi Stadion
- Capacity: 10,000
- Manager: Róbert Szűcs
- League: NB III; Southeast
- 2023–24: NB III; Southeast, 3rd of 16
- Website: www.hfc1912.hu
Home colours	Away colours

Hódmezővásárhelyi Futball Club is a professional football club based in Hódmezővásárhely, Csongrád County, Hungary, that competes in the Nemzeti Bajnokság III – Southeast, the third tier of Hungarian football.

== History ==
Hódmezővásárhely won the Csongrád county group of the 2014–15 Megyei Bajnokság I and gained promotion to the third division. The club spent four consecutive seasons in the third divison. However, they were relegated in the 2018–19 Nemzeti Bajnokság III season after finishing in the 14th position.

On 14 September 2024, Hódmezővásárhely lost 2-0 to MTK Budapest FC in the third round of the 2024–25 Magyar Kupa season and were knocked-out.

== Name changes ==
- 1996 fusion with Hódmezővásárhelyi VFC
- 1996–1998: Hódmezővásárhelyi Astra VFC
- 1998–present: Hódmezővásárhelyi FC

== Honours ==
=== League ===
- Nemzeti Bajnokság III:
  - Winners (1): 1993–94

=== County Leagues (Csongrád) ===
- Megyei Bajnokság I (level 4)
  - Winners (1): 2014–15

== Seasons ==
The table below shows the seasons of Hódmezővásárhelyi FC.

Season	Tier	Club's name	Position	Pts
1994–95	5	Hódmezővásárhelyi Astra FC	1 / 16	67
1996–97	3	Hódmezővásárhely	10 / 16	31
1997–98	4	Hódmezővásárhely	5 / 16	53
1998–99	4	Hódmezővásárhely FC	4 / 16	59
1999–00	4	Hódmezővásárhely FC	2 / 16	67
2000	3	Hódmezővásárhely FC	6 / 8	15
2000–01	4	Hódmezővásárhely FC	9 / 11	16
2001–02	4	Hódmezővásárhely FC	5 / 13	36
2002–03	4	Hódmezővásárhely FC	13 / 16	28
2003–04	4	Hódmezővásárhely FC	8 / 16	43
2004–05	4	Hódmezővásárhely FC	8 / 14	37
2005–06	3	Hódmezővásárhely FC	9 / 15	40
2006–07	3	Hódmezővásárhely FC	2 / 14	51
2007–08	3	Hódmezővásárhely FC	11 / 16	38
2008–09	3	Hódmezővásárhely FC	6 / 16	50
2009–10	3	Hódmezővásárhely FC	7 / 14	31
2010–11	3	Hódmezővásárhelyi FC	10 / 15	39
2011–12	3	Hódmezővásárhelyi FC	11 / 16	35
2012–13	3	Hódmezővásárhelyi FC	14 / 14	13
2013–14	4	Hódmezővásárhelyi FC	5 / 16	63
2014–15	4	Hódmezővásárhelyi FC	1 / 16	84
2015–16	3	Hódmezővásárhelyi FC	15 / 17	33
2016–17	3	Hódmezővásárhelyi FC	5 / 18	58
2017–18	3	Hódmezővásárhelyi FC	14 / 16	30
2018–19	3	Hódmezővásárhelyi FC	14 / 16	26
2019–20	4	Hódmezővásárhelyi FC	2 / 14	37
2020–21	3	Hódmezővásárhelyi FC	16 / 20	46
2021–22	3	Hódmezővásárhelyi FC	10 / 20	52
2022–23	3	Hódmezővásárhelyi FC	2 / 20	74
2023–24	3	Hódmezővásárhelyi FC	3 / 16	60
2024–25	3	Hódmezővásárhelyi FC	8 / 16	38
2025–26	3	Hódmezővásárhelyi FC	10 / 16	37
