= List of Paksi FC seasons =

Paksi Football Club is a professional Hungarian football club based in Paks, Hungary.

== Key ==
Nemzeti Bajnokság I

- Pld = Matches played
- W = Matches won
- D = Matches drawn
- L = Matches lost
- GF = Goals for
- GA = Goals against
- Pts = Points
- Pos = Final position

Hungarian football league system

- NBI = Nemzeti Bajnokság I
- NBII = Nemzeti Bajnokság II
- NBIII = Nemzeti Bajnokság III
- MBI = Megyei Bajnokság I

Magyar Kupa

- F = Final
- SF = Semi-finals
- QF = Quarter-finals
- R16 = Round of 16
- R32 = Round of 32
- R64 = Round of 64
- R128 = Round of 128

UEFA

- F = Final
- SF = Semi-finals
- QF = Quarter-finals
- Group = Group stage
- PO = Play-offs
- QR3 = Third qualifying round
- QR2 = Second qualifying round
- QR1 = First qualifying round
- PR = Preliminary round

Winners	Runners-up	Third	Promoted	Relegated

== Seasons ==
As of 30 July 2026.

Season	League										Cup	UEFA		Manager	Ref.
Season	Tier	Div.	MP	W	D	L	GF	GA	Pts.	Pos.	Cup	Competition	Result	Manager	Ref.
1990–91	3	NB III	28	19	4	5	65	23	42	1st		Did not qualify			
1991–92	3	NB III	30	14	6	10	36	32	34	5th		Did not qualify			
1992–93	3	NB III	30	9	9	12	43	41	27	10th		Did not qualify			
1993–94	4	MB II	34	21	9	4	110	38	51	2nd		Did not qualify			
1994–95	4	MB I ↑	30	21	6	3	84	21	69	1st		Did not qualify			
1995–96	3	NB III	30	13	10	7	54	46	49	5th		Did not qualify			
1996–97	3	NB III	30	11	8	11	53	38	41	7th		Did not qualify			
1997–98	3	NB III	30	15	7	8	56	37	52	4th		Did not qualify			
1998–99	3	NB III	30	8	7	15	43	50	31	13th		Did not qualify			
1999–2000	3	NB III	28	9	11	8	44	26	38	9th		Did not qualify			
2000–01	3	NB III	20	5	4	11	22	37	21	8th		Did not qualify			
2001–02	3	NB III	26	10	4	12	35	42	34	7th		Did not qualify			
2002–03	3	NB III ↑	30	19	8	3	64	28	65	3rd		Did not qualify			
2003–04	2	NB II	30	16	9	5	47	31	57	3rd		Did not qualify			
2004–05	2	NB II	30	16	8	6	50	23	56	2nd		Did not qualify			
2005–06	2	NB II ↑	30	25	1	4	66	22	76	1st		Did not qualify		(Hungary) Lengyel	
2006–07	1	NB I	30	10	7	13	34	38	37	11th	R32	Did not qualify		(Hungary) Lengyel	
2007–08	1	NB I	30	10	9	11	53	50	39	11th	?	Did not qualify		(Hungary) Lengyel, (Hungary) Gellei	
2008–09	1	NB I	30	9	8	13	38	51	35	11th	R64	Did not qualify		(Hungary) Gellei	
2009–10	1	NB I	30	7	10	13	31	44	31	14th	R32	Did not qualify		(Hungary) Gellei	
2010–11	1	NB I	30	17	5	8	54	37	56	2nd	R16	Did not qualify		(Hungary) Kis	
2011–12	1	NB I	30	12	9	9	47	51	45	6th	R32	Europa League	Q3	(Hungary) Kis	
2012–13	1	NB I	30	8	11	11	40	38	35	13th	R16	Did not qualify		(Hungary) Kis, (Hungary) Máté, (Serbia) Sivić	
2013–14	1	NB I	30	8	10	12	39	42	34	11th	R32	Did not qualify		(Hungary) Csertői, (Hungary) Horváth, (Hungary) Csertői	
2014–15	1	NB I	30	14	9	7	44	27	51	5th	R128	Did not qualify		(Hungary) Csertői	
2015–16	1	NB I	33	12	7	14	41	40	43	7th	R32	Did not qualify		(Hungary) Csertői	
2016–17	1	NB I	33	11	12	10	41	37	45	5th	R64	Did not qualify		(Hungary) Csertői	
2017–18	1	NB I	33	11	9	13	43	48	42	7th	R16	Did not qualify		(Hungary) Csertői	
2018–19	1	NB I	33	9	12	12	33	46	39	8th	R16	Did not qualify		(Hungary) Csertői, (Serbia) Sivić	
2019–20	1	NB I	33	11	8	14	46	53	41	10th	R16	Did not qualify		(Serbia) Sivić, (Hungary) Osztermájer	
2020–21	1	NB I	33	14	8	11	76	64	50	4th	R16	Did not qualify		(Hungary) Osztermájer, (Hungary) Bognár	
2021–22	1	NB I	33	12	7	14	75	63	43	6th	R	Did not qualify		(Hungary) Bognár	
2022–23	1	NB I	33	14	7	12	57	57	49	5th	QF	Did not qualify		(Hungary) Waltner, (Hungary) Bognár	
2023–24	1	NB I	33	17	7	9	51	42	58	2nd	W	Did not qualify		(Hungary) Bognár	
2024–25	1	NB I	33	16	9	8	65	47	57	3rd	W	Europa League/ Conference League	1QR/ PO	(Hungary) Bognár	
2025–26	1	NB I	6	4	2	0	18	9	14	1st	R32	Europa League/ Conference League	1QR/ 3QR	(Hungary) Bognár	
2026–27	1	NB I	1	1	0	0	4	2	3	2nd	R64	Conference League	2QR	(Hungary) Bognár	
