= Attila Burzi =

Hungarian footballer (born 1975)

Personal information
- Date of birth: 10 January 1975 (age 51)
- Place of birth: Vác, Hungary
- Height: 1.75 m (5 ft 9 in)
- Position: Midfielder

Team information
- Current team: Vác (manager)

Youth career
- –1993: Vác

Senior career*
| Years | Team | Apps | (Gls) |
| 1993–2001 | Vác | 43 | (7) |
| 1994 | → Hatvan (loan) | 2 | (0) |
| 1994–1995 | → Gödöllői SK(loan) | 19 | (3) |
| 1995–1996 | → SC Sopron (loan) | 11 | (0) |
| 1996 | → Százhalombatta (loan) | 12 | (0) |
| 1996–1998 | → Érd (loan) | 39 | (6) |
| 1998 | → Tiszakécske (loan) | 2 | (0) |
| 1998–1999 | → Palotás (loan) | 17 | (7) |
| 1999–2000 | → Kalocsa (loan) | 10 | (3) |
| 2001 | Fót | 18 | (1) |
| 2001–2002 | Dorog | 8 | (0) |
| 2002–2004 | Rákospalota | 65 | (4) |
| 2004–2005 | Kecskemét | 20 | (1) |
| 2005–2007 | Schlöglmühl | | |
| 2007–2008 | Soroksár | 24 | (3) |
| 2008 | Budakalász | 5 | (0) |
| 2008–2009 | Felixdorf | 6 | (0) |
| 2009 | III. Kerület | 8 | (0) |
| 2009–2012 | Csomád | 60 | (29) |
| 2012–2013 | Berkenye | 19 | (1) |
| 2013–2014 | Vác | 10 | (0) |
| 2014–2018 | Püspökszilágy | 96 | (49) |
| Total | | 494 | (114) |

Managerial career
- 2019–2020: Vác
- 2024–: Vác
- * Club domestic league appearances and goals

Attila Burzi (born 10 January 1975) is a Hungarian football manager and former professional player who is currently the manager of Megyei Bajnokság I club Vác.

== Club career ==
In 1994, he won the Nemzeti Bajnokság I with Vác.

In the 2013–14 season, he again won a league title with Vác, winning the Pest Megyei Bajnokság I, as well as the Pest Megyei Kupa.

== Managerial career ==
From the summer of 2019 until December 2020, Burzi served as manager of Vác.

In 2026, he led Vác to the final of the Pest Vármegyei Kupa. The final was played on 25 May against Dunavarsány at the Zsengellér Gyula Sportcentrum, where his side were defeated 1–0.

== Career statistics ==
=== Club ===
Appearances and goals by club, season and competition
| Club | Season | League | | | National cup (Note: Includes Magyar Kupa) | | Other | | Total | |
| Club | Season | Division | Apps | Goals | Apps | Goals | Apps | Goals | Apps | Goals |
|---|---|---|---|---|---|---|---|---|---|---|
| Vác | 1993–94 | Nemzeti Bajnokság I | 4 | 1 | 1 | 0 | — | | 5 | 1 |
| Vác | 1994–95 | Nemzeti Bajnokság I | 6 | 0 | 5 | 3 | — | | 11 | 3 |
| Vác | 1998–99 | Nemzeti Bajnokság I | 5 | 0 | — | | — | | 5 | 0 |
| Vác | 1999–2000 | Nemzeti Bajnokság I | 16 | 1 | — | | — | | 16 | 1 |
| Vác | 2000–01 | Nemzeti Bajnokság III | 12 | 5 | 3 | 1 | — | | 15 | 6 |
| Vác | Total | | 43 | 7 | 9 | 4 | — | | 52 | 11 |
| Hatvan (loan) | 1993–94 | Nemzeti Bajnokság II | 2 | 0 | — | | — | | 2 | 0 |
| Gödöllő (loan) | 1994–95 | Nemzeti Bajnokság II | 19 | 3 | — | | — | | 19 | 3 |
| SC Sopron (loan) | 1995–96 | Nemzeti Bajnokság II | 11 | 0 | 4 | 0 | — | | 15 | 0 |
| Százhalombatta (loan) | 1995–96 | Nemzeti Bajnokság II | 12 | 0 | — | | — | | 12 | 0 |
| Érd (loan) | 1996–97 | Nemzeti Bajnokság II | 22 | 2 | — | | — | | 22 | 2 |
| Érd (loan) | 1997–98 | Nemzeti Bajnokság II | 17 | 4 | — | | — | | 17 | 4 |
| Érd (loan) | Total | | 39 | 6 | — | | — | | 39 | 6 |
| Tiszakécske (loan) | 1997–98 | Nemzeti Bajnokság I | 2 | 0 | — | | — | | 2 | 0 |
| Palotás (loan) | 1998–99 | Nemzeti Bajnokság III | 17 | 7 | 2 | 0 | — | | 19 | 7 |
| Kalocsa (loan) | 1999–2000 | Nemzeti Bajnokság III | 10 | 3 | — | | — | | 10 | 3 |
| Fót | 2000–01 | Nemzeti Bajnokság II | 18 | 1 | — | | — | | 18 | 1 |
| Dorog | 2001–02 | Nemzeti Bajnokság II | 8 | 0 | 1 | 1 | — | | 9 | 1 |
| Rákospalota | 2001–02 | Nemzeti Bajnokság II | 12 | 0 | — | | — | | 12 | 0 |
| Rákospalota | 2002–03 | Nemzeti Bajnokság II | 28 | 3 | 2 | 0 | — | | 30 | 3 |
| Rákospalota | 2003–04 | Nemzeti Bajnokság II | 25 | 1 | 1 | 0 | 2 (Note: Appearances in Nemzeti Bajnokság I promotion play-offs) | 0 | 28 | 1 |
| Rákospalota | Total | | 65 | 4 | 3 | 0 | 2 | 0 | 70 | 4 |
| Kecskemét | 2004–05 | Nemzeti Bajnokság II | 20 | 1 | 1 | 0 | — | | 21 | 1 |
| Soroksár | 2006–07 | Nemzeti Bajnokság II | 10 | 3 | — | | — | | 10 | 3 |
| Soroksár | 2007–08 | Nemzeti Bajnokság II | 14 | 0 | 1 | 3 | — | | 15 | 3 |
| Soroksár | Total | | 24 | 3 | 1 | 3 | — | | 25 | 6 |
| Budakalász | 2007–08 | Nemzeti Bajnokság III | 5 | 0 | — | | — | | 5 | 0 |
| Felixdorf | 2008–09 | 2. Klasse Steinfeld | 6 | 0 | — | | — | | 6 | 0 |
| III. Kerület | 2008–09 | Nemzeti Bajnokság III | 8 | 0 | — | | — | | 8 | 0 |
| Csomád | 2009–10 | Megyei Bajnokság III | 14 | 6 | — | | — | | 14 | 6 |
| Csomád | 2010–11 | Megyei Bajnokság II | 26 | 15 | — | | 4 (Note: Appearance(s) in Pest Megyei Kupa) | 0 | 30 | 15 |
| Csomád | 2011–12 | Megyei Bajnokság II | 20 | 8 | — | | 1 | 0 | 21 | 8 |
| Csomád | Total | | 60 | 29 | — | | 5 | 0 | 65 | 29 |
| Berkenye | 2012–13 | Megyei Bajnokság I | 19 | 1 | — | | 4 (Note: Two appearances in Magyar Kupa qualifying rounds and two appearances in Megyei Bajnokság I promotion play-offs) | 0 | 23 | 1 |
| Vác | 2013–14 | Megyei Bajnokság I | 10 | 0 | — | | 2 | 0 | 12 | 0 |
| Püspökszilágy | 2014–15 | Megyei Bajnokság III | 25 | 11 | — | | 2 | 1 | 27 | 12 |
| Püspökszilágy | 2015–16 | Megyei Bajnokság III | 25 | 15 | — | | 4 | 2 | 29 | 17 |
| Püspökszilágy | 2016–17 | Megyei Bajnokság III | 18 | 7 | — | | — | | 18 | 7 |
| Püspökszilágy | 2017–18 | Megyei Bajnokság III | 18 | 11 | — | | 1 | 0 | 19 | 11 |
| Püspökszilágy | 2018–19 | Megyei Bajnokság III | 10 | 5 | — | | — | | 10 | 5 |
| Püspökszilágy | Total | | 96 | 49 | — | | 7 | 3 | 103 | 52 |
| Career total | | | 494 | 114 | 21 | 8 | 20 | 3 | 535 | 125 |

== Honours ==
=== Player ===
Vác

- Nemzeti Bajnokság I: 1993–94
- Megyei Bajnokság I – Pest: 2013–14
- Pest Megyei Kupa: 2013–14
- Magyar Kupa runner-up: 1994–95

Berkenye

- Megyei Bajnokság I – Nógrád: 2012–13

Püspökszilágy

- Megyei Bajnokság III – Pest East group: 2015–16

=== Manager ===
Vác

- Pest Vármegyei Kupa runner-up: 2025–26
