= István Markóczi =

Hungarian footballer (born 1966)

Personal information
- Date of birth: 23 September 1966 (age 60)
- Position: Striker

Youth career
- Szada

Senior career*
Years	Team	Apps	(Gls)
–1991	Gödöllő		
1991	Vasas	6	(0)
1991	Volán	0	(0)
1991–1992	Ganz Danubius		
1992–1996	Rákospalota	71	(31)
1993–1994	→ Kartal (loan)		
1996–1997	Szolnok	28	(4)
1997–1998	Eger	15	(3)
1998–2003	Kistarcsa	105	(16)
2003–2005	Aszód		
2005–2007	Gödöllő	5	(3)
2007–2009	Erdőkertes	21	(9)
Total		251	(66)
- * Club domestic league appearances and goals

István Markóczi (born 23 September 1966) is a Hungarian former professional footballer who played as a striker.

== Club career ==
=== Early years ===
Markóczi played for Szada as a youth player and won the district championship with the club in the 1980–81 season.

=== Vasas ===
On 17 February 1991, Markóczi joined Nemzeti Bajnokság I club Vasas from Nemzeti Bajnokság III club Gödöllő, with the club paying 300,000 forint for his transfer.

=== Ganz Danubius ===
In summer 1991, Markóczi joined Nemzeti Bajnokság II club Volán, but after the club transferred its right to compete in the league to Ganz Danubius, he began the season with the latter club.

=== Rákospalota ===
Markóczi won the Nemzeti Bajnokság III Mátra group title with Rákospalota in the 1992–93 season, helping the club gain promotion to the Nemzeti Bajnokság II. He spent the first half of the 1993–94 season on loan at Nemzeti Bajnokság III Mátra group club Kartal. In the 1994–95 Nemzeti Bajnokság III season, he was Rákospalota's top scorer with 13 goals, while the club finished third. He was again the club's top scorer with 16 goals in the 1995–96 Nemzeti Bajnokság III season, when Rákospalota finished second.

=== Szolnok ===
In summer 1996, Markóczi joined Nemzeti Bajnokság II East group club Szolnok, having previously been described as REAC's most troublesome forward during their rivalry in the 1992–93 and 1995–96 seasons; he was regarded as Szolnok's most valuable signing. In June 1997, Szolnok decided not to extend Markóczi's contract.

=== Gödöllő ===
In summer 2005, Markóczi joined Nemzeti Bajnokság III Mátra group club Gödöllő, that had recently gained promotion after being invited by the Hungarian Football Federation.

== Career statistics ==
Appearances and goals by club, season and competition
Club	Season	League			Magyar Kupa		Other		Total	
Club	Season	Division	Apps	Goals	Apps	Goals	Apps	Goals	Apps	Goals
Vasas	1990–91	Nemzeti Bajnokság I	6	0			—		6	0
Rákospalota	1993–94	Nemzeti Bajnokság II	14	2	—		—		14	2
Rákospalota	1994–95	Nemzeti Bajnokság III	28	13	—		—		28	13
Rákospalota	1995–96	Nemzeti Bajnokság III	29	16	—		—		29	16
Rákospalota	Total		71	31	—		—		71	31
Szolnok	1996–97	Nemzeti Bajnokság II	28	4	3	2	—		31	6
Eger	1997–98	Nemzeti Bajnokság III	15	3	—		—		15	3
Kistarcsa	1997–98	Nemzeti Bajnokság III		1	—		—			1
Kistarcsa	1998–99	Nemzeti Bajnokság III	22	9	—		—		22	9
Kistarcsa	1999–2000	Nemzeti Bajnokság III	28	3	—		—		28	3
Kistarcsa	2000–01	Nemzeti Bajnokság III	20	2	4	0	—		24	2
Kistarcsa	2001–02	Nemzeti Bajnokság III	19	0	—		—		19	0
Kistarcsa	2002–03	Nemzeti Bajnokság III	16	1	—		—		16	1
Kistarcsa	Total		105	16	4	0	—		109	16
Gödöllő	2005–06	Nemzeti Bajnokság III	5	3	—		—		5	3
Erdőkertes	2007–08	Megyei Bajnokság II	15	9	—		1	0	16	9
Erdőkertes	2008–09	Megyei Bajnokság I	6	0	—		—		6	0
Erdőkertes	Total		21	9	—		1 (Note: Appearance in Pest Megyei Kupa)	0	22	9
Career total			251	66	7	2	1	0	259	68

== Honours ==
Rákospalota

- Nemzeti Bajnokság III – Mátra: 1992–93

Erdőkertes

- Megyei Bajnokság II – Pest: 2007–08
