= 1999–2000 Magyar Kupa =

Tournament details
- Country: Hungary

Final positions
- Champions: MTK
- Runners-up: Vasas

The 1999–2000 Magyar Kupa (English: Hungarian Cup) was the 61st season of Hungary's annual knock-out cup football competition. The competition was won by MTK with a 3–1 win against Vasas.

== Group stage ==
=== Group 1 ===
Pos	Team	Pld	W	D	L	GF	GA	GD	Pts	Qualification	PAP	HAL	SAR	MTE
1	Pápa	3	2	1	0	4	1	+3	7	Advance to knockout phase	—	2–0	0–0	2–1
2	Haladás	3	2	0	1	3	3	0	6	Advance to knockout phase		—		
3	Sárvár	3	0	2	1	1	2	−1	2			0–1	—	
4	MTE	3	0	1	2	3	5	−2	1			1–2	1–1	—

=== Group 2 ===
Pos	Team	Pld	W	D	L	GF	GA	GD	Pts	Qualification	GYO	CEL	BEL	AJK
1	Győr	3	3	0	0	14	1	+13	9	Advance to knockout phase	—			
2	Celldömölk	3	2	0	1	11	2	+9	6	Advance to knockout phase	1–2	—		
3	Beled	3	1	0	2	4	13	−9	3		0–6	0–7	—	4–0
4	Ajka	3	0	0	3	0	13	−13	0		0–6	0–3 (Note: Awarded)		—

=== Group 3 ===
Pos	Team	Pld	W	D	L	GF	GA	GD	Pts	Qualification	VES	ZAL	HAR	KAP
1	Veszprém	3	2	1	0	6	2	+4	7	Advance to knockout phase	—	1–1		2–0
2	Zalaegerszeg	3	2	1	0	4	2	+2	7	Advance to knockout phase		—		
3	Harkány	3	1	0	2	4	6	−2	3		1–3	1–2	—	2–1
4	Kaposvár	3	0	0	3	1	5	−4	0			0–1		—

=== Group 4 ===
Pos	Team	Pld	W	D	L	GF	GA	GD	Pts	Qualification	KAP	VID	HEV	ATO
1	Kaposfüred	3	2	1	0	7	2	+5	7	Advance to knockout phase	—	2–2	2–0	3–0
2	Videoton	3	1	2	0	8	5	+3	5	Advance to knockout phase		—		
3	Hévíz	3	1	0	2	3	7	−4	3			2–5	—	
4	Atomerőmű	3	0	1	2	1	5	−4	1			1–1	0–1	—

=== Group 5 ===
Pos	Team	Pld	W	D	L	GF	GA	GD	Pts	Qualification	DUN	KER	BAR	KOR
1	Dunaferr	3	3	0	0	15	1	+14	9	Advance to knockout phase	—			
2	III. Kerület	3	2	0	1	6	7	−1	6	Advance to knockout phase	1–5	—		
3	Baracs	3	1	0	2	3	8	−5	3		0–5	1–3	—	2–0
4	Koroncó	3	0	0	3	1	9	−8	0		0–5	1–2		—

=== Group 6 ===
Pos	Team	Pld	W	D	L	GF	GA	GD	Pts	Qualification	KIS	BOD	SZA	DOR
1	Kispest-Honvéd	3	1	2	0	6	5	+1	5	Advance to knockout phase	—			
2	Bodajk	3	1	2	0	4	3	+1	5	Advance to knockout phase	1–1	—	3–2	0–0
3	Százhalombatta	3	1	1	1	9	8	+1	4		3–3		—	
4	Dorog	3	0	1	2	3	6	−3	1		1–2		2–4	—

=== Group 7 ===
Pos	Team	Pld	W	D	L	GF	GA	GD	Pts	Qualification	SIO	FOT	ABD	BUD
1	Siófok	3	3	0	0	10	2	+8	9	Advance to knockout phase	—			
2	Fót	3	1	1	1	8	7	+1	4	Advance to knockout phase	1–3	—		
3	Abda	3	1	1	1	12	13	−1	4		1–6	4–4	—	
4	Budafok	3	0	0	3	3	11	−8	0		0–1	0–3	3–7	—

=== Group 8 ===
Pos	Team	Pld	W	D	L	GF	GA	GD	Pts	Qualification	BVS	GAZ	CEG	MON
1	BVSC-Zugló	3	3	0	0	8	2	+6	9	Advance to knockout phase	—	1–0		
2	Gázszer	3	2	0	1	4	2	+2	6	Advance to knockout phase		—		
3	Cegléd	3	1	0	2	5	8	−3	3		0–3 (Note: Awarded)	1–3	—	
4	Monor	3	0	0	3	4	9	−5	0		2–4	0–1	2–4	—

=== Group 9 ===
Pos	Team	Pld	W	D	L	GF	GA	GD	Pts	Qualification	DIO	PAS	RAK	HEV
1	Diósgyőr	3	2	1	0	10	2	+8	7	Advance to knockout phase	—			
2	Pásztó	3	1	2	0	4	2	+2	5	Advance to knockout phase	1–1	—	0–0	3–1
3	Rákospalota	3	0	2	1	2	8	−6	2		0–6		—	
4	Heves	3	0	1	2	4	8	−4	1		1–3		2–2	—

=== Group 10 ===
Pos	Team	Pld	W	D	L	GF	GA	GD	Pts	Qualification	TAP	BKV	SAL	JAS
1	Tápiószentmárton	3	1	2	0	8	6	+2	5	Advance to knockout phase	—	2–2	3–1	
2	BKV Előre	3	1	2	0	4	3	+1	5	Advance to knockout phase		—		
3	Salgótarján	3	1	0	2	7	4	+3	3			0–1	—	
4	Jászfényszaru	3	0	2	1	4	10	−6	2		3–3	1–1	0–6	—

=== Group 11 ===
Pos	Team	Pld	W	D	L	GF	GA	GD	Pts	Qualification	CSE	MEZ	TAP
1	Csepel	2	2	0	0	2	0	+2	6	Advance to knockout phase	—		
2	Mezőkövesd	2	1	0	1	1	1	0	3		0–1	—	
3	Tápiógyörgye	2	0	0	2	0	2	−2	0		0–1	0–1	—

=== Group 12 ===
Pos	Team	Pld	W	D	L	GF	GA	GD	Pts	Qualification	JAS	BLO	BEK
1	Jászberény	2	2	0	0	5	0	+5	6	Advance to knockout phase	—		2–0
2	Blondy	2	1	0	1	1	3	−2	3		0–3	—	1–0
3	Békéscsaba	2	0	0	2	0	3	−3	0				—

=== Group 13 ===
Pos	Team	Pld	W	D	L	GF	GA	GD	Pts	Qualification	SZE	KIS	MAG
1	Szeged	2	2	0	0	12	1	+11	6	Advance to knockout phase	—		
2	Kiskunfélegyháza	2	1	0	1	2	4	−2	3		0–3	—	
3	Magyarbánhegyes	2	0	0	2	2	11	−9	0		1–9	1–2	—

=== Group 14 ===
Pos	Team	Pld	W	D	L	GF	GA	GD	Pts	Qualification	VAC	KIS	MIS
1	Vác	2	1	1	0	7	1	+6	4	Advance to knockout phase	—		
2	Kisléta	2	1	1	0	4	2	+2	4		1–1	—	3–1
3	Miskolc	2	0	0	2	1	9	−8	0		0–6		—

=== Group 15 ===
Pos	Team	Pld	W	D	L	GF	GA	GD	Pts	Qualification	KAZ	EGE	DEM	KEM
1	Kazincbarcika	3	2	0	1	7	2	+5	6	Advance to knockout phase	—	2–0	1–2	
2	Eger	3	2	0	1	8	4	+4	6	Advance to knockout phase		—	3–1	
3	Demecser	3	2	0	1	5	5	0	6				—	
4	Kemecse	3	0	0	3	2	11	−9	0		0–4	1–5	1–2	—

=== Group 16 ===
Pos	Team	Pld	W	D	L	GF	GA	GD	Pts	Qualification	BAK	NYI	BOR
1	Baktalórántháza	2	1	1	0	4	3	+1	4	Advance to knockout phase	—	2–2	2–1
2	Nyírség-Spartacus	2	0	2	0	3	3	0	2			—	
3	Borsod Volán	2	0	1	1	2	3	−1	1			1–1	—

== Knockout phase ==
=== Round of 32 ===
Team 1	Score	Team 2
Fót	1–0	Diósgyőr
Baktalórántháza	1–3	Kispest-Honvéd
Pásztó	2–3	Vasas
MTK	2–0	Gázszer
Szeged	0–1	BVSC-Zugló
Bodajk	0–3	Újpest
Csepel	0–3	Dunaferr
Kazincbarcika	1–3	Vác
Tápiószentmárton	2–1	III. Kerület
Pápa	0–1	Eger
Celldömölk	0–2	Siófok
Debrecen	2–1	BKV Előre
Videoton	0–1	Veszprém
Győr	1–0	Haladás
Zalaegerszeg	0–1	Ferencváros
Kaposfüred	2–2 (a.e.t.); 7–6 (pen.)	Jászberény

=== Round of 16 ===
Team 1	Score	Team 2
Kispest-Honvéd	0–1	Újpest
Dunaferr	3–0	Siófok
Eger	1–2	Vác
Kaposfüred	4–5	Tápiószentmárton
BVSC-Zugló	3–0	Fót
Vasas	4–1	Ferencváros
Veszprém	0–3	Debrecen
Győr	0–1	MTK

=== Quarter-finals ===
Team 1	Score	Team 2
MTK	1–0	Dunaferr
Újpest	1–2	Vasas
Tápiószentmárton	2–1	Vác
Debrecen	3–1	BVSC-Zugló

=== Semi-finals ===
Team 1	Score	Team 2
MTK	4–0	Debrecen
Tápiószentmárton	1–4	Vasas

=== Final ===
3 May 2000
20:00 (UTC+2)

MTK	3–1	Vasas
A. Tóth 49' (o.g.); Halmai 56'; Kenesei 77'	Report	Szilveszter 12'

Népstadion, Budapest
Attendance: 4,000
Referee: Attila Hajdó (Hungary)

== See also ==
- 1999–2000 Nemzeti Bajnokság I
