= 2009–10 Magyar Kupa =

Tournament details
- Country: Hungary

Final positions
- Champions: Debrecen (4th title)
- Runners-up: Zalaegerszeg

The 2009–10 Magyar Kupa (English: Hungarian Cup) was the 70th season of Hungary's annual knock-out cup football competition. It started with the first match of First round on 5 August 2009 and ended with the final held on 8 May 2010 at Stadium Puskás Ferenc, Budapest. The winners earned a place in the second qualifying round of the 2010–11 UEFA Europa League. Budapest Honvéd were the defending champions.

== First round ==
Matches were played between 5 and 9 August 2009 and involved the teams qualified through the local cup competitions during the previous season and the Nemzeti Bajnokság III teams.

Team #1	Score	Team #2
Szőlőskert–Nagyréde SC	3–7	Mezőkövesdi SE
Paksi SE II	1–2	Szentlőrinc SE
Balatonkeresztúr KSK	1–3	Hévíz FC
Markaz FC	0–6	Diógyőri VTK II
NTE 1866 MÁV	1–3	Nagyatád
Lébény SE	2–1	Sárvári FC
Nyirbátori FC	3–0	Berettyóújfalui SE
Törteli KSK	1–6	Orosháza FC
Tápiószecső FC	1–3	Jánoshidai SE
Monostorpályi KSE	0–4	Mátészalkai MTK
Soproni VSE	2–3	Répcelak SE
Újpest FC II	1–2	Balassagyarmati VSE
Tisza Volán SC	4–2	Kecskeméti TE II
Pénzügyőr SE	2–2; 4–5 pen	Rákosmenti KSK
Dunaföldvár FC	4–1	Szigetvári Zrínyi MSE
Kinizsi SC Szabadegyháza	7–2	FC Ajka
Tállya KSE	1–3	Mándok KSE
Cigánd SE	2–4	Nyírmadai ISE
Sárospataki TC	2–0	Várda SE
KSE Karancslapujtő	0–2	Turai VSK
Vácduka KSK	2–3	Szügy SE
Herendi PSK	2–3	Bakonycsernyei Bányász SE
Kentaur ASC	0–0; 12–13 pen	Rum KSC
Dörögdi Medence SE	2–1	Pákozd SE
Koroncó SE	3–5	Sárisáp–SIKÉR SE
Ugod SE	1–4	Mosonmagyaróvári TE
Pellérd SE	1–6	Bonyhád Völgység LC
Babcsán Művek SC	1–6	Vasas II

Team #1	Score	Team #2
Kömlőd KSK	0–4	Börcs KSK
Törökbálinti TC	3–4	Újbuda FC
Verőce SE	2–2; 3–4 pen	Mátranovák VSC
Lövő SE	5–2	Nemesszalók ESE
Vajai II. Rákóczi F. SE	2–3	Nyírábrányi KSE
Sülysáp KSK	0–1	Jászladányi ESE
Istenmezeje SE	1–2	Putnok VSE
Ősi PSE	1–6	Pálhalmai SE
Öskü MFC	2–3	Sárosd NSC
Rábapatyi KSK	4–3	KSE Csesztreg
Gázművek MTE	0–5	Érdi VSE
Ják SE	2–0^{1}	Police–Ola LSK
Tótkomlósi TC	0–2	Ladánybenei FC
Kisújszállási SE	1–1; 2–4 pen	Kondorosi TE
FC Tiszaújváros	2–4	Kemecse SE
Csanytelek SC	0–2	Harta SE
Harkakötönyi TSE	1–2	Algyő SK
Teskánd SE	3–0	Táplán SE
Pogány SE	3–1	Szekszárdi UFC
Balatonszárszó SE	1–3	Veszprém FC
Lábatlani Egyetértés SE	0–8	Győrszemere KSK
Szajki SE	1–1; 3–4 pen	Kalocsa
Bajcs SE	0–4	Celldömölki VSE
Kaposmérői SE	1–0	Gránit Gyógyfürdő SE
Öreglaki MEDOSZ	1–4	Semjénháza SE
Gönc VMSE	1–2	Tiszalök VSE
Hevesi LSC	5–1	Aszaló SE

^{1}Police–Ola LSK advanced to the next round because Ják SE used an ineligible player.

== Second round ==
Matches were played between 19 and 26 August and on 23 September 2009 and involved the winners of First round and the 2009–10 Nemzeti Bajnokság II teams.

Team #1	Score	Team #2
Kaposmérői SE	0–3	Kozármisleny SE
Pogány SE	3–4	Kaposvölgye VSC
Tisza Volán SC	2–4	Békéscsaba Előre SE
Putnok VSE	2–1	Kemecse SE
Érdi VSE	2–3	Vecsési FC
Tura VSK	4–2	BKV Előre
Rákosmenti KSK	1–2	Tököl KSK
Ladánybenei FC	4–5	Szolnoki MÁV
Újbuda FC	0–1	Szigetszentmiklósi TK
Mosonmagyaróvári TE	1–0	Celldömölki VSE
Sárospataki TC	1–2	Baktalórántháza VSE
Jászberényi SE	0–4	Ceglédi VSE
Pálhalmai SE	1–0	Bonyhád Völgység LC
Jánoshidai SE	4–3	Hevesi LSC
Jászladányi ESE	2–3	Mezőkövesdi SE
Százhalombattai LK	2–4	Budaörsi SC
Vasas II	0–3	Balassagyarmat SE
Mándok KSE	4–1	Bőcs KSC
Semjénháza SE	2–3	FC Ajka
Mátranovák VSC	2–10	MTK Budapest II
Lébény SE	1–0	Répcelak SE

Team #1	Score	Team #2
Lövő SE	3–0	Rábapatyi KSK
Rum KSC	0–5	Zalaegerszegi TE II
Dörögdi Medence SE	1–2	Hévíz FC
Teskánd SE	0–2	BFC Siófok
Börcs KSK	0–6	Videoton–Puskás Akadémia
Sárisáp-SIKÉR SE	1–3	Győri ETO II
Győrszemere KSK	6–0	Bakonycsernyei Bányász SE
Sárosd NSC	0–1	Bajai LSE
Harta SE	2–1	Dunaföldvár FC
Kinizsi SC Szabadegyháza	11–1	Kalocsa
Algyő SK	1–4	Orosháza FC
Kondorosi TE	1–3	Makó FC
Nyírmadai ISE	4–2	Diósgyőri VTK II
Tiszalök VSE	0–3	DVSC–DEAC
Nyírábrány KSE	1–2	Mátészalkai MTK
Erzsébeti Spartacus MTK LE	2–3	Dunakanyar-Vác
Szügy SE	0–5	REAC
Nagyatád	1–3	Pécsi MFC
Nyírbátori FC	4–0	Kazincbarcikai SC
Szentlőrinc SE	0–1	Barcsi SC
Police–Ola LSK	0–5	Veszprém FC

== Third round ==
Matches were played between 9 and 29 September 2009. The winners of Second round were joined by the majority of the 2009–10 Nemzeti Bajnokság I teams; sides involved in a European cup competition were given a bye to the next round.

Team #1	Score	Team #2
Lébény SE	0–6	Gyirmót SE
Lövő SE	1–8	FC Ajka
Győri ETO II	0–2	Lombard Pápa
Mosonmagyaróvári TE	0–7	Győri ETO
Győrszemere KSK	1–5	FC Tatabánya
Kinizsi SC Szabadegyháza	0–3	Kaposvölgye VSC
Pálhalmai SE	2–1	BFC Siófok
Kozármisleny SE	0–1	Paksi SE
Hévíz FC	0–3	Zalaegerszegi TE
Zalaegerszegi TE II	1–5	Pécsi MFC
Tököl KSK	2–1	Barcsi SC
Puskás Akadémia FC	0–3	Videoton
Ceglédi VSE	1–0	Békéscsaba Előre SE
Veszprém FC	1–2	Kaposvári Rákóczi
Bajai LSE	2–1	Makó FC
Orosháza FC	0–3	Kecskeméti TE
Harta SE	1–7	Szolnoki MÁV
Mátészalkai MTK	0–6	Mezőkövesdi SE
Putnok VSE	2–3	DVSC–DEAC
Nyírmadai ISE	2–0	Nyíregyháza Spartacus
Mándok KSE	1–2	Diósgyőr
Nyírbátori FC	2–1 (aet)	Baktalórántháza VSE
Vecsési FC	0–5	MTK Budapest
Dunakanyar-Vác	2–0	Budaörsi SC
MTK Budapest II	2–0	Ferencváros
Turai VSK	5–4 (aet)	Vasas
Balassagyarmati VSE	1–7	REAC
Jánoshidai SE	0–2	Szigetszentmiklósi TK

== Round of 32 ==
Matches were played between 29 September and 7 October 2009 and involved the winners of Third round.

Team #1	Score	Team #2
FC Tatabánya	1–2	Lombard Pápa
FC Ajka	1–5	Győri ETO
Bajai LSE	0–1	Haladás
Pécsi MFC	0–1 aet	Zalaegerszegi TE
Kaposvölgye VSC	1–0	Paksi SE
Pálhalmai SE	1–4	Videoton
Gyirmót SE	1–1 aet 4–5 pen	Kaposvári Rákóczi
Turai VSK	0–6	MTK Budapest
Dunakanyar-Vác	0–2	Budapest Honvéd
MTK Budapest II	0–4	Újpest
Ceglédi VSE	1–3	Kecskeméti TE
Tököli KSK	0–1	Szigetszentmiklósi TK
REAC	1–4	Szolnoki MÁV
Nyírbátori FC	0–4	Diósgyőr
Nyírmadai ISE	2–8	Debreceni VSC
Mezőkövesdi SE	4–2	DVSC–DEAC

== Round of 16 ==
The sixteen winners of the Round of 32 were drawn into eight two-legged matches. The first-leg matches were played between 20 and 22 October 2009, the return legs took place on 27–28 October 2009. The winners on aggregate advanced to the next round.

Team 1	Agg.	Team 2	1st leg	2nd leg
Haladás	1–3	Zalaegerszegi TE	0–2	1–1
Győri ETO	3–1	Kaposvári Rákóczi	1–1	2–0
Videoton	3–0	Lombard Pápa	3–0	0–0
Kecskeméti TE	4–11	Újpest	2–5	2–6
Szolnoki MÁV	4–4 (a)	Budapest Honvéd	4–1	0–3
Kaposvölgye VSC	4–5	Szigetszentmiklósi TK	2–2	2–3
MTK Budapest	6–0	Diósgyőr	3–0	3–0
Mezőkövesdi SE	4–8	Debreceni VSC	1–4	3–4

== Quarter-finals ==
As in the previous round, ties were played over two legs. The winners advanced to the semi-finals.

Team 1	Agg.	Team 2	1st leg	2nd leg
Szigetszentmiklósi TK	1–6	Zalaegerszegi TE	0–3	1–3
Videoton	0–2	Újpest	0–1	0–1
Budapest Honvéd	2–1	Győri ETO	1–1	1–0
Debreceni VSC	2–2	MTK Budapest	2–0	0–2

11 November 2009
13:00 CET (UTC+01)

Szigetszentmiklósi TK	0–3	Zalaegerszegi TE
		Pavićević 6', 27'; Rajcomar 80'

Sporttelep, Szigetszentmiklós
Attendance: 150
Referee: János Takács
17 November 2009
13:00 CET (UTC+01)

Zalaegerszegi TE	3–1	Szigetszentmiklósi TK
Kamber 33'; Máté 62'; Pavićević 89'		Riedl 30'

ZTE Arena, Zalaegerszeg
Attendance: 100
Referee: J. Zoltán Kovács

Zalaegerszegi TE advanced 6–1 on aggregate.

17 November 2009
18:00 CET (UTC+01)

Videoton	0–1	Újpest
		Kabát 43'

Stadion Sóstói, Székesfehérvár
Attendance: 1,648
Referee: Péter Solymosi
25 November 2009
18:00 CET (UTC+01)

Újpest	1–0	Videoton
Sándor 74'		Horváth (red card) 40'

Szusza Ferenc Stadium, Budapest
Attendance: 1,976
Referee: Viktor Kassai

Újpest advanced 2–0 on aggregate.

17 November 2009
18:00 CET (UTC+01)

Budapest Honvéd	1–1	Győri ETO
Moreira 65'		Aleksidze 70'

Bozsik Stadion, Budapest
Attendance: 800
Referee: Zsolt Szabó
25 November 2009
17:00 CET (UTC+01)

Győri ETO	0–1	Budapest Honvéd
		Diego 9'

ETO Park, Győr
Attendance: 1,000
Referee: Péter Solymosi

Budapest Honvéd advanced 2–1 on aggregate.

13 December 2009
17:30 CET (UTC+01)

Debreceni VSC	2–0	MTK Budapest
Feczesin 45'; Czvitkovics 50'

Stadion Oláh Gábor Út, Debrecen
Attendance: 2,000
Referee: István Vad
17 December 2009
17:30 CET (UTC+01)

MTK Budapest	2–0	Debreceni VSC
Pál 77'; Zsidai 80'
Penalties
Pál (penalty scored); Zsidai (penalty scored); Melczer (penalty scored); Hidvégi (penalty scored); Nikházi (penalty missed)	4–5	(penalty scored) Czvitkovics; (penalty scored) Laczkó; (penalty scored) Fodor; (penalty scored) Feczesin; (penalty scored) Mijadinoszki

Stadion Hidegkuti Nándor, Budapest
Attendance: 300
Referee: Mihály Fábián

Aggregate score 2–2, Debreceni VSC advanced on penalty shootout.

== Semi-finals ==
Ties in the semi-finals were also played over two legs.

Team 1	Agg.	Team 2	1st leg	2nd leg
Budapest Honvéd	2–3	Debreceni VSC	1–1	1–2
Újpest	0–1	Zalaegerszegi TE	0–1	0–0

23 March 2010
18:00 CET (UTC+01)

Budapest Honvéd	1–1	Debreceni VSC
Abraham 89'		Szilágyi 81'

Bozsik Stadion, Budapest
Attendance: 1,000
Referee: Zoltán Iványi
13 April 2010
18:00 CET (UTC+01)

Debreceni VSC	2–1	Budapest Honvéd
Laczkó 34', 85'		Abraham 84'

Stadion Oláh Gábor Út, Debrecen

Debreceni VSC advances 3–2 on aggregate.

24 March 2010
18:00 CET (UTC+01)

Újpest	0–1	Zalaegerszegi TE
Vaskó (red card) 61'		Balázs 88'

Szusza Ferenc Stadium, Budapest
Attendance: 1,500
Referee: István Vad
14 April 2010
18:00 CET (UTC+01)

Zalaegerszegi TE	0–0	Újpest

ZTE Arena, Zalaegerszeg
Attendance: 5,855
Referee: Péter Solymosi

Zalaegerszegi TE advances 1–0 on aggregate.

== Final ==
26 May 2010
19:00 CET (UTC+01)

Debreceni VSC	3–2	Zalaegerszegi TE
Coulibaly 24' 68'; Yannick 30'	Report	Pavićević 41'; Rudņevs 70'

Ferenc Puskás Stadium, Budapest
Attendance: 5,000
Referee: István Vad (Budapest)

== See also ==
- 2009–10 Nemzeti Bajnokság I
- 2009–10 Nemzeti Bajnokság II
- 2009–10 Nemzeti Bajnokság III
- 2009–10 Ligakupa
