= Zsolt Szoboszlai =

Hungarian footballer (born 1974)

Personal information
- Date of birth: 13 December 1974 (age 51)
- Height: 1.89 m (6 ft 2 in)
- Position: Midfielder

Senior career*
Years	Team	Apps	(Gls)
1994–1995	Sárbogárd	24	(16)
1995–1997	Csákvár	53	(21)
1997–2000	Tatabánya	64	(7)
2000–	SC Schönau		
2002	Ikarus-Dunafém	14	(4)
2002–2007	Polgárdi		(32)
2007–2008	Alba Regia	26	(17)
2008–2010	Csákvár	20	(6)
2010–2011	Kápolnásnyék	1	(0)
2011	Iszkaszentgyörgy	9	(2)
Total		211	(105)
- * Club domestic league appearances and goals

Zsolt Szoboszlai (born 13 December 1974) is a Hungarian former professional footballer who played as a midfielder.

== Career ==
On 17 December 1999, the professional management of Tatabánya, led by sporting director József Kiprich, announced that Szoboszlai was among several players who would not be retained for the future. By 31 January 2000, he was reported to be in discussions with Nemzeti Bajnokság II side Rákospalota regarding a potential move.

== Personal life ==
Szoboszlai married Zsanett Németh in 1998 and is the father of their son, Dominik Szoboszlai, born in 2000. They later had a daughter, Szofi, born in 2017.

== Career statistics ==
Appearances and goals by club, season and competition
Club	Season	League			Magyar Kupa		Other		Total	
Club	Season	Division	Apps	Goals	Apps	Goals	Apps	Goals	Apps	Goals
Sárbogárd	1994–95	Megyei Bajnokság I	24	16	—		—		24	16
Csákvár	1995–96	Nemzeti Bajnokság III	25	8	5	2	—		30	10
Csákvár	1996–97	Nemzeti Bajnokság III	28	13	4	2	—		32	15
Csákvár	Total		53	21	9	4	—		62	25
Tatabánya	1997–98	Nemzeti Bajnokság III	19	4	—		1 (Note: Appearance in Nemzeti Bajnokság III promotion play-offs)	0	20	4
Tatabánya	1998–99	Nemzeti Bajnokság II	34	3	6	2	—		40	5
Tatabánya	1999–2000	Nemzeti Bajnokság I	11	0	—		—		11	0
Tatabánya	Total		64	7	6	2	1	0	71	9
Ikarus-Dunafém	2001–02	Nemzeti Bajnokság III	14	4	—		—		14	4
Polgárdi	2003–04	Megyei Bajnokság II		32	—		—			32
Alba Regia	2007–08	Megyei Bajnokság I	26	17	—		2 (Note: Appearance(s) in Magyar Kupa qualifying rounds)	0	28	17
Csákvár	2008–09	Megyei Bajnokság II	9	2	—		1	1	10	3
Csákvár	2009–10	Megyei Bajnokság I	11	4	—		3	3	14	7
Csákvár	Total		20	6	—		4	4	24	10
Kápolnásnyék	2009–10	Megyei Bajnokság I	1	0	—		—		1	0
Iszkaszentgyörgy	2010–11	Megyei Bajnokság II	9	2	—		—		9	2
Iszkaszentgyörgy	2011–12	Megyei Bajnokság I	0	0	—		—		0	0
Iszkaszentgyörgy	Total		9	2	—		—		9	2
Career total			211	105	15	6	7	4	233	115

== Honours ==
Tatabánya

- Nemzeti Bajnokság II: 1998–99
- Magyar Kupa runner-up: 1998–99

Csákvár

- Megyei Bajnokság II – Fejér: 2008–09

Iszkaszentgyörgy

- Megyei Bajnokság II – Fejér: 2010–11

Individual

- Megyei Bajnokság II – Fejér top scorer: 2003–04
