= 1998–99 Nemzeti Bajnokság III =

Nemzeti Bajnokság III
- Season: 1998–1999
- Champions: Százhalombattai FC (West); Dunakeszi MÁV Adtrans (East)
- Promoted: Százhalombattai FC (West); BKV Előre SC (West); Dunakeszi MÁV Adtrans (East); Csepel Austromobilar FC (East)

The 1998–1999 Nemzeti Bajnokság III season was the 18th edition of the Nemzeti Bajnokság III.

== League tables ==
=== Western group ===
Pos	Team	Pld	W	D	L	GF	GA	GD	Pts	Promotion or relegation
1	Százhalombattai FC	28	17	6	5	65	26	+39	57	Promotion to Nemzeti Bajnokság II
2	BKV Előre SC	28	16	7	5	45	24	+21	55	Promotion to Nemzeti Bajnokság II
3	Dorogi FC	28	14	8	6	42	25	+17	50	
4	Royal Goldavis Hévíz	28	15	5	8	48	32	+16	50	
5	Sárvári FC	28	12	8	8	39	39	0	44	
6	Beremendi Építők SK	28	11	9	8	37	28	+9	42	
7	Pécsi VSK-Pécs '96 FC	28	12	5	11	35	39	−4	41	
8	Mosonmagyaróvári TE-MOTIM	28	10	4	14	34	42	−8	34	
9	Atomerőmű SE	28	7	11	10	34	38	−4	32	
10	Szigetszentmiklósi TK	28	9	5	14	31	46	−15	32	
11	Jerking Szekszárd UFC	28	9	5	14	31	46	−15	32	Relegation to Megyei Bajnokság I
12	Szentgotthárdi VSE	28	7	9	12	34	50	−16	30	
13	Büki TK-Gyógyfürdő Rt.-HH	28	8	4	16	28	32	−4	28	
14	Budafoki LC	28	5	12	11	35	51	−16	27	
15	Veszprém LC 2000	28	6	6	16	26	46	−20	24	
-	Royal Goldavis Zalaapáti (Note: merger with Hévíz during the season)	0	-	-	-	-	-	—	0	

=== Eastern group ===
Pos	Team	Pld	W	D	L	GF	GA	GD	Pts	Promotion or relegation
1	Dunakeszi MÁV Adtrans	26	16	7	3	41	18	+23	55	Promotion to Nemzeti Bajnokság II
2	Csepel Austromobilar FC	26	12	8	6	41	31	+10	44	Promotion to Nemzeti Bajnokság II
3	Nyírbátori FC	26	11	8	7	48	33	+15	41	
4	Kiskunfélegyházi TK	26	12	5	9	51	46	+5	41	
5	Kazincbarcikai SC	26	10	10	6	44	32	+12	40	
6	Gyulai FC	26	10	9	7	32	26	+6	39	
7	Palotás SE	26	11	5	10	50	44	+6	38	
8	FC Hatvan	26	9	9	8	44	49	−5	36	
9	FC Eger-Tengely Közmű	26	7	14	5	44	28	+16	35	
10	Rákospalotai EAC	26	7	6	13	28	36	−8	27	
11	Kiskőrösi FC	26	7	6	13	28	37	−9	27	
12	Borsod Volán SE	26	6	9	11	26	37	−11	27	
13	Tápiószecső FC	26	6	6	14	41	66	−25	23 (Note: 1 point deducted)	Relegation to Megyei Bajnokság I
14	Kalocsai FC	26	4	6	16	30	65	−35	18	Relegation to Megyei Bajnokság I
15	Püspökladányi FC (Note: withdrew)	0	0	0	0	0	0	0	0	Relegation to Megyei Bajnokság I
16	Szegedi EAC (Note: withdrew)	0	0	0	0	0	0	0	0	Relegation to Megyei Bajnokság I

== See also ==
- 1998–99 Magyar Kupa
- 1998–99 Nemzeti Bajnokság I
- 1998–99 Nemzeti Bajnokság II
