= 1993–94 Nemzeti Bajnokság III =

Nemzeti Bajnokság III
- Season: 1993–94
- Champions: Hódmezővásárhelyi LC (Alföld); Soproni Távközlési SE (Bakony); Pécsi VSK (Dráva); Tatabányai SC (Duna); Salgótarjáni BTC (Mátra); Stop-Miskolci VFC (Tisza)

The 1993–94 Nemzeti Bajnokság III season was the 13th edition of the Nemzeti Bajnokság III.

== League tables ==
=== Alföld group ===
Pos	Team	Pld	W	D	L	GF	GA	GD	Pts	Promotion or relegation
1	Hódmezővásárhelyi LC	30	21	6	3	60	20	+40	48	Promotion to Nemzeti Bajnokság II
2	Kecskeméti SC	30	15	11	4	61	25	+36	41	
3	Kalocsai FC	30	15	7	8	57	29	+28	37	
4	Makó FC	30	14	9	7	46	31	+15	37	
5	Szegedi VSE	30	11	13	6	53	40	+13	35	
6	Gyula FC	30	13	9	8	44	33	+11	35	
7	Kecskeméti TE	30	14	6	10	47	23	+24	34	
8	Szegedi Dózsa SC	30	10	10	10	48	40	+8	30	
9	Kiskunfélegyházi TK	30	11	8	11	45	45	0	30	
10	Ceglédi Kossuth Honvéd SE	30	12	5	13	50	43	+7	29	
11	Orosházi MTK	30	9	10	11	42	44	−2	28	
12	Colors SE	30	10	7	13	45	53	−8	27	
13	Mezőkovácsháza TE	30	10	5	15	29	52	−23	25	
14	Gyomaendrődi BSE	30	9	6	15	25	53	−28	24	Relegation to Megyei Bajnokság I
15	Szőreg FC	30	6	5	19	26	62	−36	17	Relegation to Megyei Bajnokság I
16	Törökszentmiklósi SE	30	0	3	27	13	98	−85	3	Relegation to Megyei Bajnokság I

=== Bakony group ===
Pos	Team	Pld	W	D	L	GF	GA	GD	Pts	Promotion or relegation
1	Soproni Távközlési SE	30	18	8	4	71	30	+41	44	Promotion to Nemzeti Bajnokság II
2	MOTIM TE	30	16	9	5	73	42	+31	41	
3	Linde SE Répcelak	30	16	8	6	58	28	+30	40	
4	Petőházi Cukorgyári SE	30	13	12	5	50	32	+18	38	
5	Tapolcai Bauxit Ifjúsági SE	30	14	8	8	58	37	+21	36	
6	Balatonfüredi SC	30	14	7	9	44	26	+18	35	
7	Lenti Tempó TE	30	12	11	7	45	29	+16	35	
8	Püspökmolnári KSK	30	9	12	9	42	42	0	30	
9	Győri Dózsa SE	30	10	9	11	49	46	+3	29	
10	Hévízi SK	30	10	9	11	44	52	−8	29	
11	Botka-MÁV DAC	30	9	8	13	48	46	+2	26	
12	Szentgotthárdi MSE	30	7	11	12	33	35	−2	25	
13	Körmendi FC	30	10	4	16	34	60	−26	24	
14	Peremartoni SC	30	9	4	17	48	69	−21	22	Relegation to Megyei Bajnokság I
15	ELMAX Vasas SE Pápa	30	5	6	19	25	78	−53	16	Relegation to Megyei Bajnokság I
16	Ajkai LC	30	3	4	23	19	89	−70	10	Relegation to Megyei Bajnokság I

=== Dráva group ===
Pos	Team	Pld	W	D	L	GF	GA	GD	Pts	Promotion or relegation
1	Pécsi VSK	30	19	10	1	55	13	+42	48	Promotion to Nemzeti Bajnokság II
2	DD Gáz	30	17	7	6	50	20	+30	41	
3	Kaposvári Rákóczi FC	30	15	8	7	63	33	+30	38	
4	Komlói Bányász SK	30	15	6	9	63	38	+25	36	
5	Balatonföldvári SE	30	16	3	11	49	30	+19	35	
6	Kisdorogi MEDOSZ SE	30	10	13	7	31	24	+7	33	
7	Gerjeni MEDOSZ SE	30	12	8	10	42	33	+9	32	
8	Marcali VSE	30	11	9	10	54	41	+13	31	
9	Bonyhádi SE	30	10	10	10	42	41	+1	30	
10	Nagyatádi VSE	30	13	4	13	47	54	−7	30	
11	Kaposvári Honvéd SE	30	9	9	12	30	37	−7	27	
12	Letenye SE	30	11	5	14	34	52	−18	27	
13	Bólyi SE	30	8	8	14	33	55	−22	24	
14	Döbrököz TSz SK	30	7	8	15	32	57	−25	22	Relegation to Megyei Bajnokság I
15	Barcsi SC	30	5	6	19	29	57	−28	16	
16	Fonyódi Petőfi SE	30	4	2	24	15	84	−69	10	Relegation to Megyei Bajnokság I

=== Duna group ===
Pos	Team	Pld	W	D	L	GF	GA	GD	Pts	Promotion or relegation
1	Tatabányai SC	28	14	11	3	65	29	+36	39	Promotion to Nemzeti Bajnokság II
2	Érdi VSE	28	14	8	6	50	24	+26	36	
3	Szigetszentmiklósi TK	28	13	9	6	44	35	+9	35	
4	Rákosmenti TK	28	13	8	7	60	41	+19	34	
5	Honvéd Szondi Velence SE	28	13	7	8	48	36	+12	33	
6	Multi-Rocco FC	28	12	7	9	52	51	+1	31	
7	Ercsi Kinizsi SK	28	13	4	11	36	45	−9	30	
8	Dunavarsányi KSK	28	10	9	9	45	44	+1	29	
9	Bakonycsernyei Bányász SK	28	9	8	11	35	44	−9	26	
10	UFC Tatabánya	28	11	3	14	34	42	−8	25	
11	EAC Rádiótaxi	28	8	8	12	35	44	−9	24	
12	Szentendrei Petőfi HSE	28	9	5	14	36	51	−15	23	
13	Malév SC	28	8	5	15	34	46	−12	21	Relegation to Megyei Bajnokság I
14	Dömsödi VSE	28	6	8	14	28	46	−18	20	Relegation to Megyei Bajnokság I
15	Lajoskomáromi SE	28	5	4	19	34	58	−24	14	Relegation to Megyei Bajnokság I
16	Esztergomi Vasas SE (Note: withdrew)	0	0	0	0	0	0	0	0	Relegation to Megyei Bajnokság I

=== Mátra group ===
Pos	Team	Pld	W	D	L	GF	GA	GD	Pts	Promotion or relegation
1	Salgótarjáni BTC	30	23	6	1	75	17	+58	52	Promotion to Nemzeti Bajnokság II
2	Jászberényi SE	30	22	2	6	76	23	+53	46	
3	Szolnoki MÁV MTE	30	15	7	8	40	20	+20	37	
4	Füzesabony SC	30	14	6	10	33	25	+8	34	
5	Dunakeszi VSE	30	13	8	9	39	34	+5	34	
6	Karcag Épkar VSE	30	13	5	12	64	55	+9	31	
7	Szécsényi VSE	30	12	7	11	36	40	−4	31	
8	Pásztói FC	30	10	10	10	29	28	+1	30	
9	Monori SE	30	11	6	13	37	45	−8	28	
10	Tenk SE	30	7	11	12	29	38	−9	25	
11	Gyöngyösi AK	30	11	3	16	34	47	−13	25	
12	Apci TE	30	8	8	14	30	42	−12	24	
13	Balassagyarmati LC	30	9	6	15	36	49	−13	24	
14	Kartal KSK 1	30	9	7	14	33	56	−23	23 (Note: 2 points deducted)	Relegation to Megyei Bajnokság I
15	Bagi FC	30	7	7	16	22	45	−23	21	Relegation to Megyei Bajnokság I
16	Szolnoki Cukor FC	30	5	3	22	16	65	−49	13	Relegation to Megyei Bajnokság I

=== Tisza group ===
Pos	Team	Pld	W	D	L	GF	GA	GD	Pts	Promotion or relegation
1	Stop-Miskolci VFC	28	15	8	5	43	20	+23	38	Promotion to Nemzeti Bajnokság II
2	Kisvárdai SE	28	14	9	5	63	21	+42	37	
3	Szerencs-Balox VSE	28	13	10	5	47	25	+22	36	
4	Nyírbátor FC	28	13	9	6	46	27	+19	35	
5	Rakamazi Spartacus SE	28	14	6	8	52	29	+23	34	
6	Püspökladányi VSE	28	13	7	8	40	32	+8	33	
7	Tiszafüred Városi SE	28	11	9	8	44	30	+14	31	
8	Ózdi Kohász SE	28	10	11	7	39	32	+7	31	
9	Mátészalkai MTK	28	11	8	9	35	24	+11	30	
10	Borsodi Építők Volán SC	28	10	8	10	36	32	+4	28	
11	Nagykálló SE	28	10	6	12	29	48	−19	26	
12	Tiszaújvárosi SC	28	7	9	12	23	38	−15	23	
13	Edelényi VSE	28	7	8	13	32	47	−15	22	
14	Derecske SSE	28	3	4	21	19	82	−63	8 (Note: 2 points deducted)	Relegation to Megyei Bajnokság I
15	Hajdúszoboszlói VSE	28	1	4	23	16	77	−61	6	Relegation to Megyei Bajnokság I
16	Stop FC-Nagycsécs (Note: fusion with Miskolci VSC)	0	0	0	0	0	0	0	0	Relegation to Megyei Bajnokság I

== See also ==
- 1993–94 Magyar Kupa
- 1993–94 Nemzeti Bajnokság I
- 1993–94 Nemzeti Bajnokság II
