= 1999–2000 Nemzeti Bajnokság III =

Nemzeti Bajnokság III
- Season: 1999–2000
- Champions: Hévíz SK (West); Kiskőrösi FC (East)
- Promoted: Hévíz SK (West); Kiskőrösi FC (East); Fóti SE (East)

The 1999–2001 Nemzeti Bajnokság III season was the 18th edition of the Nemzeti Bajnokság III.

== League tables ==
=== Western group ===
Pos	Team	Pld	W	D	L	GF	GA	GD	Pts	Promotion
1	Royal Goldavis Hévíz SK	26	15	6	5	47	21	+26	51	Promotion to Nemzeti Bajnokság II
2	Veszprém LC	26	13	11	2	48	16	+32	50	
3	Marcali VSE	26	14	4	8	48	25	+23	46	
4	Celldömölki VSE-Antók	26	12	9	5	40	22	+18	45	
5	Dorogi FC	26	12	7	7	40	28	+12	43	
6	Mosonmagyaróvári TE Motim	26	11	9	6	41	22	+19	42	
7	Büki TK	26	11	6	9	42	30	+12	39	
8	Beremendi Építők	26	10	5	11	33	39	−6	35	
9	Sárvári FC	26	9	7	10	29	25	+4	34	
10	Balatonlelle SE	26	8	10	8	24	26	−2	34	
11	Taksonyi SE	26	7	7	12	38	38	0	28	
12	Szigetszentmiklósi TK	26	6	10	10	28	35	−7	28	
13	Pécsi VSK-Pécs '96 FC	26	6	2	18	21	73	−52	20	
14	Budafoki LC	26	0	3	23	9	88	−79	3	
15	Atomerőmű SE (Note: withdrew)	0	0	0	0	0	0	0	0	
16	Szentgotthárd VSE (Note: withdrew)	0	0	0	0	0	0	0	0	

=== Eastern group ===
Pos	Team	Pld	W	D	L	GF	GA	GD	Pts	Promotion or relegation
1	Kiskőrösi FC	28	19	6	3	52	23	+29	63	Promotion to Nemzeti Bajnokság II
2	Kunszentmártoni TE	28	19	5	4	53	23	+30	62	
3	FC Eger Tengely-Közmű	28	18	2	8	64	33	+31	56	
4	Fóti SE	28	16	7	5	51	26	+25	55	Promotion to Nemzeti Bajnokság II
5	Jászberényi SE	28	14	3	11	46	26	+20	45	
6	Gyulai Termál FC	28	13	6	9	48	37	+11	45	
7	Borsod Volán SE	28	11	10	7	36	31	+5	43	
8	Nyírbátori FC	28	11	8	9	49	37	+12	41	
9	Monor-Ilzer	28	11	7	10	46	35	+11	40	
10	Kalocsai FC	28	8	7	13	31	49	−18	31	
11	Kazincbarcikai SC	28	7	8	13	35	50	−15	29	
12	FC Hatvan	28	5	8	15	33	61	−28	23	
13	Kiskunfélegyházi TK	28	6	3	19	37	67	−30	21	
14	Dunakeszi Kinizsi SE	28	5	4	19	37	72	−35	19	
15	Gyomaendrőd	28	2	6	20	16	64	−48	12	Relegation Megyei Bajnokság I
16	Miskolci VSC (Note: deleted)	0	0	0	0	0	0	0	0	Relegation Megyei Bajnokság I

== See also ==
- 1999–2000 Magyar Kupa
- 1999–2000 Nemzeti Bajnokság I
- 1999–2000 Nemzeti Bajnokság II
