= 1998–99 Nemzeti Bajnokság II =

Nemzeti Bajnokság II
- Season: 1998–99
- Champions: Tatabánya
- Promoted: Tatabánya; Nagykanizsa; Szeged
- Relegated: Salgótarján; Tiszavasvári; Soroksár; Soproni FAC
- Top goalscorer: Sándor Horváth (23 goals)
- All statistics correct as of 21 January 2017.

The 1998–99 Nemzeti Bajnokság II was the 101st season of the Nemzeti Bajnokság II, the second tier of the Hungarian football league. The championship was won by Lombard FC Tatabánya and they were also promoted to the 1999–2000 Nemzeti Bajnokság I along with Nagykanizsa and Szeged LC. Four teams including Salgótarjáni BTC, Tiszavasvári, Soroksár and Soproni FAC were relegated to the 1999–2000 Nemzeti Bajnokság III.

== Teams ==
At the end of 1997-98 season, Nyíregyháza, Dunaferr and III. Kerület promoted to Nemzeti Bajnokság I.

Three teams were relegated to Nemzeti Bajnokság III : Csepel, Dorog and Paks.

The winners and runners-up of the two 1997–98 Nemzeti Bajnokság III series were promoted to NB III: Demecser, Soroksár, Komárom and Tatabánya.

=== Stadium and locations ===
Location of teams in 1998-99 Nemzeti Bajnokság II

Following is the list of clubs competing in 2015–16 Nemzeti Bajnokság II, with their location, stadium and stadium capacity.

Team	Location	Stadium	Capacity
Békéscsaba 1912 Előre	Békéscsaba	Kórház utcai Stadion	2,479
Demecseri FC	Demecser	Városi Sporttelep	TBA
Érdi Sport	Érd	Ercsi úti pálya	3,500
KCFC-Hajdúszoboszló	Hajdúszoboszló	Bocskai Stadion	3,500
Kaposvári Rákóczi FC	Kaposvár	Rákóczi Stadion	7,000
Kecskeméti FC	Kecskemét	Széktói Stadion	6,320
Komáromi FC	Komárom	Czibor Zoltán Sporttelep	4,132
Komlói Bányász SK	Komló	Bányász Stadion	10,000
Nagykanizsai Olajbányász	Nagykanizsa	Olajbányász Sporttelep	7,000
Pécsi MFC	Pécs	Stadion PMFC	7,000
Salgótarjáni BTC	Salgótarján	Tó-strandi Sporttelep	TBA
Matáv Sopron	Sopron	Matáv Stadion	3,000
Soproni FAC	Sopron	Anger réti Sprottelep	1,000
Soroksári TE	Budapest	Szamosi Mihály Sporttelep	5,000
Szeged LC	Szeged	Felső Tisza-parti Stadion	15,000
Szolnoki MÁV FC	Szolnok	Véső utcai Sportpálya	6,000
Lombard FC Tatabánya	Tatabánya	Grosics Gyula Stadion	5,021
Tiszakécskei FC	Tiszakécske	Városi Stadion	4,500
Tiszaújvárosi FC	Tiszaújváros	Városi Sport Park	4,000
ICN Tiszavasvári	Tiszavasvári	Városi Sporttelep	TBA

== League table ==
Pos	Team	Pld	W	D	L	GF	GA	GD	Pts	Promotion or relegation
1	Tatabánya (P)	38	25	8	5	85	50	+35	83	Promotion to Nemzeti Bajnokság I
2	Nagykanizsa (P)	38	20	11	7	66	38	+28	71	Promotion to Nemzeti Bajnokság I
3	Szeged (P)	38	19	13	6	72	32	+40	70	Promotion to Nemzeti Bajnokság I
4	Salgótarján (R)	38	20	7	11	63	39	+24	67	Relegation to Nemzeti Bajnokság III
5	Matáv Sopron	38	17	11	10	61	50	+11	62	
6	Tiszaújváros	38	16	12	10	54	48	+6	60	
7	Komárom	38	17	6	15	59	50	+9	57	
8	Érd	38	17	6	15	59	52	+7	57	
9	Szolnok	38	14	11	13	57	55	+2	53	
10	Komló	38	14	11	13	56	59	−3	53	
11	Tiszakécske	38	14	10	14	52	54	−2	52	
12	Tiszavasvári (R)	38	12	14	12	46	40	+6	50	Relegation to Nemzeti Bajnokság III
13	Békéscsaba	38	12	13	13	45	38	+7	49	
14	Kaposvár	38	13	8	17	49	66	−17	47	
15	Demecser	38	11	12	15	47	54	−7	45	
16	Pécs	38	12	9	17	52	63	−11	45	
17	Hajdúszoboszló	38	12	8	18	63	69	−6	44	
18	Soroksár (R)	38	9	8	21	48	84	−36	35	Relegation to Nemzeti Bajnokság III
19	Kecskemét	38	4	7	27	32	81	−49	19	
20	Soproni FAC (Note: Deducted 15 points) (R)	38	5	9	24	39	83	−44	9	Relegation to Nemzeti Bajnokság III

Source: (in Hungarian)
Rules for classification: 1st points; 2nd overall wins; 3rd goal difference; 4th head-to-head points; 5th head-to-head goal difference; 6th head-to-head away goals scored; 7th fair-play points; 8th drawing of lots
(P) Promoted; (R) Relegated

== Results ==
Home \ Away	BÉK	DEM	ÉRD	HAJ	KAP	KEC	KOM	KBÁ	MAT	NAG	PÉC	SAL	SFA	SOR	SZE	SZO	TAT	TKÉ	TÚJ	TVA
Békéscsaba		3–1	0–0	3–0	2–1	3–0	1–0	1–1	0–0	3–1	0–1	3–4	2–0	3–0	1–1	4–1	1–1	0–0	0–0	0–1
Demecser	1–1		1–0	4–1	1–2	2–0	0–1	1–1	3–2	0–1	3–2	2–2	4–0	2–0	2–2	1–0	1–1	1–1	3–1	2–2
Érdi Sport	2–1	3–2		3–4	2–1	3–2	4–0	2–1	1–0	2–2	6–1	2–0	3–0	5–1	0–2	1–1	1–3	1–0	1–2	0–0
Hajdúszoboszló	1–0	2–0	3–3		1–1	5–4	2–0	3–1	1–2	0–1	2–0	1–1	6–0	6–0	2–0	1–1	2–3	1–1	1–1	1–1
Kaposvár	0–2	1–1	2–1	3–2		2–0	2–1	1–1	2–1	1–2	4–2	3–0	1–0	2–0	2–2	2–1	2–4	3–3	0–1	1–0
Kecskemét	0–0	0–3	0–1	2–5	0–0		2–1	0–1	0–1	0–1	0–4	1–2	1–3	2–2	0–1	0–3	0–2	1–2	2–2	0–3
Komárom	1–1	3–0	4–0	3–1	3–0	3–0		2–1	0–1	1–0	2–0	2–1	1–0	1–2	1–1	2–0	4–2	1–0	1–1	1–0
Komló	1–2	1–0	1–0	1–0	1–1	2–1	2–1		2–2	1–2	1–1	1–0	4–2	1–1	3–0	2–3	1–2	2–1	1–0	1–0
Matáv Sopron	2–1	2–2	1–0	2–1	1–2	2–2	2–1	5–0		1–1	1–1	1–0	3–1	3–1	2–2	2–1	1–1	2–1	0–1	1–1
Nagykanizsa	3–1	1–0	3–0	5–0	1–0	4–0	2–2	2–1	2–0		1–2	3–2	3–0	1–1	1–1	3–1	0–0	2–0	3–0	0–0
Pécs	2–2	1–2	1–3	3–0	1–2	2–1	1–1	1–1	0–0	3–3		2–4	3–0	2–1	0–0	0–1	1–0	1–2	1–0	1–0
Salgótarján	2–0	2–0	1–0	2–0	3–1	4–1	2–1	4–0	1–0	1–1	1–2		0–0	3–0	2–0	5–2	1–2	1–0	0–0	2–1
Sopron	1–1	0–0	2–3	2–1	4–1	1–1	3–4	1–6	2–3	1–2	1–1	1–5		0–3	1–1	1–2	1–3	2–0	2–0	2–2
Soroksár	2–0	0–0	2–0	3–0	2–1	2–3	2–3	3–4	3–3	3–2	2–1	0–3	0–0		1–5	2–5	2–1	2–3	1–2	1–1
Szeged	0–1	5–0	2–0	3–0	7–1	0–0	2–0	2–1	0–3	3–0	2–0	0–0	2–0	4–0		2–1	1–2	2–1	3–2	0–0
Szolnok	1–0	1–1	3–1	1–2	1–1	3–0	3–1	1–1	0–2	2–2	2–1	2–0	2–1	2–2	0–0		0–1	0–0	4–2	1–0
Tatabánya	2–1	3–0	1–3	2–0	4–0	1–2	4–3	3–0	3–2	2–1	3–2	2–0	3–2	2–0	4–3	3–3		2–0	5–2	3–2
Tiszakécske	1–1	2–1	1–0	3–3	2–0	2–1	1–0	3–3	2–4	1–2	4–0	1–0	2–0	3–0	0–5	3–2	1–1		2–2	2–0
Tiszaújváros	1–0	2–0	1–2	2–1	1–0	3–1	2–2	2–0	1–0	1–1	2–4	1–1	4–2	1–0	1–1	3–1	1–1	3–0		2–0
Tiszavasvári	2–0	2–0	0–0	2–1	3–0	1–2	2–1	2–2	4–2	1–0	3–1	0–1	0–0	4–1	0–2	0–0	3–3	2–1	1–1	

Updated to match(es) played on 31 May 1999. Source: (in Hungarian)
Legend: Blue = home team win; Yellow = draw; Red = away team win.

== See also ==
- 1998–99 Magyar Kupa
- 1998–99 Nemzeti Bajnokság I
- 1998–99 Nemzeti Bajnokság III
