= 2002–03 Nemzeti Bajnokság I =

Nemzeti Bajnokság I
- Season: 2002–03
- Dates: 26 July 2002 – 31 May 2003
- Champions: MTK Budapest
- Relegated: Kispest Honvéd; Dunaferr
- Champions League: MTK Budapest
- UEFA Cup: Ferencváros; Debrecen
- Intertoto Cup: Győr; Videoton
- Matches: 192
- Goals: 584 (3.04 per match)
- Top goalscorer: Krisztián Kenesei (23)
- Biggest home win: Debrecen 6–1 Békéscsaba
- Biggest away win: Békéscsaba 0–5 Sopron
- Highest scoring: Siófok 5–3 Debrecen; Kispest 3–5 MTK

The 2002–03 Nemzeti Bajnokság I, also known as NB I, was the 101st season of top-tier football in Hungary. The league was officially named Borsodi Liga for sponsoring reasons. The season started on 26 July 2002 and ended on 31 May 2003.

== Overview ==
It was contested by 12 teams, and MTK Hungária FC won the championship under Sándor Egervári. MTK won the league on the last day of the season, at Újpest's stadium, Megyeri Road. The white and blues defeated Újpest 1-0, while Ferencváros were unable to overcome Debrecen, and had to settle for a 2nd-place finish.

Budapest Honvéd suffered a relegation for the first time in their history. Their drop to the division below was confirmed on the 23rd of May, after losing 3–1 at defending champions Zalaegerszeg.

== First stage ==
=== League standings ===
Pos	Team	Pld	W	D	L	GF	GA	GD	Pts	Qualification
1	Ferencváros	22	15	3	4	41	17	+24	48	Qualification for championship playoff
2	MTK Hungária	22	14	5	3	42	21	+21	47	Qualification for championship playoff
3	Újpest	22	12	4	6	45	29	+16	40	Qualification for championship playoff
4	Debrecen	22	10	9	3	44	30	+14	39	Qualification for championship playoff
5	Siófok	22	8	8	6	28	27	+1	32	Qualification for championship playoff
6	Győr	22	9	5	8	35	35	0	32	Qualification for championship playoff
7	Zalaegerszeg	22	8	6	8	37	36	+1	30	Qualification for relegation playoff
8	Videoton	22	7	6	9	29	30	−1	27	Qualification for relegation playoff
9	Sopron	22	6	5	11	33	36	−3	23	Qualification for relegation playoff
10	Dunaferr	22	4	6	12	28	43	−15	18	Qualification for relegation playoff
11	Kispest Honvéd	22	4	3	15	27	51	−24	15	Qualification for relegation playoff
12	Békéscsaba	22	4	2	16	25	59	−34	14	Qualification for relegation playoff

Source: rsssf.com

=== Results ===
Home \ Away	BÉK	DEB	DUN	FTC	GYŐ	HON	MTK	SIÓ	SOP	UTE	VID	ZTE
Békéscsaba		0–3	1–3	0–2	2–4	4–0	2–2	1–1	0–5	1–3	0–2	3–1
Debrecen	6–1		3–2	2–0	3–1	3–2	0–0	1–1	3–3	2–5	0–0	2–1
Dunaferr	3–0	2–2		2–2	1–2	1–3	3–3	0–0	1–0	3–1	0–0	3–3
Ferencváros	0–1	0–0	3–0		5–2	4–0	0–1	4–0	2–0	1–0	1–0	3–2
Győr	5–2	0–1	1–0	1–2		3–1	1–0	2–2	2–0	1–3	0–4	1–1
Kispest Honvéd	2–0	1–3	1–0	1–2	0–2		3–5	1–2	1–1	1–4	0–0	3–3
MTK Hungária	3–0	4–3	5–1	0–1	2–0	2–1		1–0	0–0	1–0	3–1	3–0
Siófok	4–1	1–1	2–0	0–2	1–1	0–2	0–1		2–1	3–2	1–1	1–0
Sopron	3–1	1–2	4–1	1–3	0–0	4–2	3–2	1–2		0–1	2–0	2–2
Újpest	2–0	1–1	2–1	3–0	2–2	4–2	1–2	1–1	3–0		2–1	0–2
Videoton	1–3	2–2	3–0	0–3	1–4	2–0	0–0	2–4	3–2	1–2		2–1
Zalaegerszeg	4–2	2–1	2–1	1–1	2–0	2–0	1–2	1–0	3–0	3–3	0–3	

Source: rsssf.com
Legend: Blue = home team win; Yellow = draw; Red = away team win.

== Second stage ==
=== Championship playoff ===
==== League standings ====
Pos	Team	Pld	W	D	L	GF	GA	GD	Pts	Qualification
1	MTK Hungária (C)	32	20	6	6	59	34	+25	66	Qualification for Champions League second qualifying round
2	Ferencváros	32	19	7	6	50	24	+26	64	Qualification for UEFA Cup qualifying round
3	Debrecen	32	13	14	5	57	38	+19	53	Qualification for UEFA Cup qualifying round
4	Újpest	32	15	7	10	54	41	+13	52	
5	Siófok	32	12	11	9	46	44	+2	47	
6	Győr	32	9	9	14	41	50	−9	36	Qualification for Intertoto Cup first round

Source: rsssf.com
(C) Champions

==== Results ====
Home \ Away	DEB	FTC	GYŐ	MTK	SIÓ	UTE
Debrecen		1–1	0–0	1–2	1–1	2–0
Ferencváros	0–0		1–0	2–1	0–2	2–1
Győr	0–0	0–2		2–3	1–1	0–0
MTK Hungária	1–0	0–0	3–1		3–1	1–2
Siófok	3–5	2–1	2–1	4–2		2–3
Újpest	0–3	0–0	3–1	0–1	0–0	

Source: rsssf.com
Legend: Blue = home team win; Yellow = draw; Red = away team win.

=== Relegation playoff ===
==== League standings ====
Pos	Team	Pld	W	D	L	GF	GA	GD	Pts	Qualification or relegation
7	Zalaegerszeg	32	15	8	9	62	49	+13	53	
8	Videoton	32	11	7	14	46	41	+5	40	Qualification for Intertoto Cup first round
9	Sopron	32	9	9	14	47	54	−7	36	
10	Békéscsaba	32	9	5	18	42	71	−29	32	
11	Kispest Honvéd (R)	32	8	5	19	43	66	−23	29	Relegation to Nemzeti Bajnokság II
12	Dunaferr (R)	32	4	8	20	37	72	−35	20	Relegation to Nemzeti Bajnokság II

Source: rsssf.com
(R) Relegated

==== Results ====
Home \ Away	BÉK	DUN	HON	SOP	VID	ZTE
Békéscsaba		2–0	3–1	2–2	1–0	1–1
Dunaferr	0–4		1–3	1–2	2–2	2–3
Kispest Honvéd	1–1	4–1		0–0	1–0	1–2
Sopron	1–3	1–1	3–2		0–2	2–2
Videoton	3–0	4–0	1–2	1–2		2–0
Zalaegerszeg	3–2	4–1	3–1	4–1	3–2	

Source: rsssf.com
Legend: Blue = home team win; Yellow = draw; Red = away team win.

== Statistical leaders ==
=== Top goalscorers ===
Rank	Scorer	Club	Goals
1	(Hungary) Krisztián Kenesei	Zalaegerszegi TE	23
2	(Hungary) Béla Illés	MTK Hungária	21
3	(Romania) Marius Şumudică	Debreceni VSC	16
4	(Hungary) Attila Tököli	Dunaferr SE	15
5	(Hungary) Mihály Tóth	FC Sopron	14
5	(Hungary) Zoltán Kovács	Újpest FC	14
7	(Hungary) Ferenc Horváth	Újpest FC	13
8	(Hungary) Zoltán Fülöp	Siófok FC	10
8	(Hungary) Sándor Torghelle	Kispest Honvéd FC	10
8	(Hungary) Károly Szanyó	Győri ETO FC	10
8	(Hungary) Gábor Zavadszky	MTK Hungária	10

== Attendances ==
#	Club	Average
1	Ferencváros	7,683
2	Debrecen	5,044
3	Zalaegerszeg	4,844
4	Békéscsaba	4,125
5	Siófok	3,050
6	Újpest	2,560
7	Győr	2,406
8	Kispest Honvéd	2,331
9	Sopron	2,328
10	Dunaújváros	2,319
11	MTK	1,988
12	Videoton	1,829

== See also ==
- 2002–03 Magyar Kupa
- 2002–03 Nemzeti Bajnokság II
- 2002–03 Nemzeti Bajnokság III
