= 1999–2000 Nemzeti Bajnokság II =

Nemzeti Bajnokság II
- Season: 1999–2000
- Champions: Videoton; Matáv-Sopron

The 1999–2000 Nemzeti Bajnokság II was the 102nd season of the Nemzeti Bajnokság II, the second tier of the Hungarian football league.

== League table ==
Pos	Team	Pld	W	D	L	GF	GA	GD	Pts	Promotion or relegation
1	Videoton FC Fehérvár	38	32	5	1	104	19	+85	101	Promotion to Nemzeti Bajnokság I
2	Matáv Sopron FC	38	24	6	8	83	28	+55	78	
3	BKV Előre SC	38	19	9	10	59	32	+27	66	
4	Kecskeméti FC	38	20	6	12	60	39	+21	66	
5	Rákóczi FC Contimex	38	18	11	9	47	33	+14	65	
6	Békéscsabai Előre FC	38	18	10	10	53	37	+16	64	
7	Cegléd FC	38	17	8	13	67	57	+10	59	
8	Szolnoki MÁV - Neusiedler	38	18	5	15	65	69	−4	59	
9	ADtranz Dunakeszi VSE	38	16	10	12	59	52	+7	58	Relegation to Nemzeti Bajnokság III
10	III. Kerület FC	38	15	10	13	57	59	−2	55	Relegation to Nemzeti Bajnokság III
11	Százhalombattai FC	38	15	9	14	59	48	+11	54	
12	FC Tiszaújváros	38	14	10	14	51	47	+4	52	
13	BVSC-Zugló FC	38	13	12	13	50	44	+6	51	
14	Komlói Bányász SK	38	13	10	15	52	56	−4	49	
15	Hajdúszoboszló	38	12	6	20	51	91	−40	42	
16	Rákospalotai EAC	38	11	3	24	42	79	−37	36	
17	Diego - FC Dabas	38	8	9	21	48	75	−27	33	
18	Demecser FC	38	6	12	20	40	70	−30	30	
19	Komáromi FC	38	7	6	25	47	106	−59	27	
20	Csepel SC	38	3	5	30	25	78	−53	14	

== See also ==
- 2001–02 Magyar Kupa
- 2001–02 Nemzeti Bajnokság I
- 2001–02 Nemzeti Bajnokság III
