= 2002–03 Nemzeti Bajnokság II =

Nemzeti Bajnokság II
- Season: 2002–03
- Champions: Pécsi MFC
- Promoted: Pécsi MFC; Szombathelyi Haladás
- Relegated: Celldömölk; Monori SE; Vasas SC; Demecser

The 2002–03 Nemzeti Bajnokság II was the 105th season of the Nemzeti Bajnokság II, the second tier of the Hungarian football league.

== League table ==
Pos	Team	Pld	W	D	L	GF	GA	GD	Pts	Promotion or relegation
1	Pécsi Mecsek FC	34	21	10	3	71	34	+37	73	Promotion to Nemzeti Bajnokság I
2	Lombard FC Haladás	34	17	11	6	55	28	+27	62	Promotion to Nemzeti Bajnokság I
3	Büki TK-Bükfürdő-HH	34	16	12	6	55	22	+33	60	
4	Rákospalotai EAC	34	18	6	10	60	44	+16	60	
5	Nyírség-Spartacus FC	34	15	10	9	63	44	+19	55	
6	Százhalombattai FC	34	13	14	7	53	48	+5	53	
7	Kaposvári Rákóczi	34	13	12	9	52	39	+13	51	
8	Pápai ELC	34	14	8	12	52	45	+7	50	
9	Szolnoki MÁV FC	34	14	6	14	57	58	−1	48	
10	Kecskeméti FC	34	13	9	12	57	42	+15	48	
11	Újpest FC-Fót	34	12	8	14	46	54	−8	44	
12	BKV Előre SC	34	12	7	15	54	56	−2	43	
13	Balassagyarmati SE-Goldex-Anettka	34	10	10	14	49	57	−8	40	
14	Hévíz FC	34	9	11	14	50	61	−11	38	
15	Diósgyőri VTK	34	12	8	14	45	50	−5	38 (Note: 6 points deducted from Diósgyőr)	
16	FC Tatabánya-Auto Trader	34	9	6	19	40	57	−17	33	
17	Celldömölk VSE	34	8	6	20	27	60	−33	30	Relegation to Nemzeti Bajnokság III
18	Monor-Sáma	34	2	2	30	24	111	−87	8	Relegation to Nemzeti Bajnokság III
19	Vasas SC (Note: Matches played by Vasas SC were deleted.)	0	-	-	-	-	-	—	0	Relegation to Nemzeti Bajnokság III
20	Demecser FC (Note: Did not play in the league.)	0	-	-	-	-	-	—	0	Relegation to Nemzeti Bajnokság III

== See also ==
- 2002–03 Magyar Kupa
- 2002–03 Nemzeti Bajnokság I
- 2002–03 Nemzeti Bajnokság III
