= 1997–98 Nemzeti Bajnokság III =

Nemzeti Bajnokság III
- Season: 1997–1998
- Champions: Komáromi FC (West); Demecseri Kinizsi SE (East)
- Promoted: Komáromi FC (West); Lombard FC Tatabánya (West); Demecseri Kinizsi SE (East); Soroksári TE (East)

The 1997–98 Nemzeti Bajnokság III season was the 17th edition of the Nemzeti Bajnokság III.

== League table ==
=== Western group ===
Pos	Team	Pld	W	D	L	GF	GA	GD	Pts	Promotion or relegation
1	Komáromi FC	30	23	4	3	73	28	+45	73	Promotion to Nemzeti Bajnokság II
2	Lombard FC Tatabánya	30	18	4	8	59	31	+28	58	Promotion to Nemzeti Bajnokság II
3	Beremend	30	15	6	9	51	28	+23	51	
4	BKV Előre SC	30	15	5	10	42	33	+9	50	
5	Győri Dózsa	30	15	3	12	63	65	−2	48	Relegation to Megyei Bajnokság I
6	MTE-MOTIM	30	14	4	12	41	37	+4	46	
7	Budafoki LC	30	12	8	10	46	41	+5	44	
8	Royal Sped Zalaapáti	30	12	6	12	41	38	+3	42	
9	Százhalombattai FC	30	11	8	11	44	38	+6	41	
10	Sárvári FC	30	12	4	14	49	48	+1	40	
11	Hévíz	30	11	5	14	39	50	−11	38	
12	Büki TK	30	11	4	15	45	48	−3	37	
13	Györköny	30	8	9	13	30	44	−14	33	Relegation to Megyei Bajnokság I
14	Csákvári FC	30	9	4	17	34	57	−23	31	Relegation to Megyei Bajnokság I
15	Dunaszentgyörgy-Limex SE	30	7	9	14	32	55	−23	30	Relegation to Megyei Bajnokság I
16	Jutas Veszprém	30	3	5	22	22	70	−48	11 (Note: 3 points deducted)	Relegation to Megyei Bajnokság I

=== Eastern group ===
Pos	Team	Pld	W	D	L	GF	GA	GD	Pts	Promotion or relegation
1	Demecseri Kinizsi SE	30	17	11	2	54	21	+33	62	Promotion to Nemzeti Bajnokság II
2	Soroksári TE	30	17	6	7	45	24	+21	57	Promotion to Nemzeti Bajnokság II
3	Dunakeszi VSE	30	12	12	6	43	24	+19	48	
4	Kiskőrös	30	12	11	7	47	34	+13	47	
5	Palotás	30	12	11	7	38	26	+12	47	
6	Kazincbarcikai SC	30	11	12	7	45	28	+17	45	
7	Borsod Volán	30	11	12	7	45	46	−1	45	
8	Rákospalotai EAC	30	11	10	9	36	40	−4	43	
9	Nyírbátor	30	11	9	10	37	36	+1	42	
10	FC Eger-Egertej	30	8	12	10	27	23	+4	36	
11	Kiskunfélegyházi TK	30	8	11	11	29	37	−8	35	
12	Kalocsai FC	30	8	8	14	42	54	−12	32	
13	Szegedi EAC	30	7	9	14	28	40	−12	30	
14	FC Hatvan	30	6	9	15	29	48	−19	27	Relegation to Megyei Bajnokság I
15	Tiszafüredi VSE	30	5	9	16	30	64	−34	24	Relegation to Megyei Bajnokság I
16	Hajdúnánási FK	30	5	6	19	26	56	−30	21	Relegation to Megyei Bajnokság I

== Promotion play-off ==
Date		Result	
10 June 1998	Lombard FC Tatabánya (2nd in the 1997–98 Nemzeti Bajnokság III)	2–0	FC Tiszaújváros (18th in the 1997–98 Nemzeti Bajnokság II)
14 June 1998	Lombard FC Tatabánya	3–2	FC Tiszaújváros
10 June 1998	Szolnoki MÁV (17th in the 1997–98 Nemzeti Bajnokság II)	1–0	Soroksári TE (2nd in the 1997–98 Nemzeti Bajnokság III)
14 June 1998	Szolnoki MÁV	1–2	Soroksári TE

== See also ==
- 1997–98 Magyar Kupa
- 1997–98 Nemzeti Bajnokság I
- 1997–98 Nemzeti Bajnokság II
