= Kaposfüred SC =

Hungarian football club

Kaposfüred S.C.
- Full name: Kaposfüred Sport Club
- Founded: 1987; 38 years ago as Kaposfüredi Sportegyesület
- Ground: Kaposfüredi Sportpálya, Kaposvár
- Chairman: Péter Vincze
- Manager: Gábor Pál
- League: Megye II – Group South
- Website: https://www.kaposfuredsc.hu/

Kaposfüred Sport Club is a Hungarian football club, located in Kaposfüred, Kaposvár. Füred is currently playing in lower division, but between 1996 and 2000 they were in the Hungarian 3rd league. They were in the best 16 in the Hungarian National Cup in 1999. The club has a big rivalization with the team of a close village, Toponár SE.

== History ==
Kaposfüred's sport history's first written documents are from 1922. The club's name was "Kaposfüred Sportegyesület", and it had many sections, including cycling, volleyball, athletics, handball, tennis, bowling, and naturally: football. The club has ceased by the time, and it was only re-founded in 1987. This is the current club's founding date. Now, it has only one section: football. Gyula Balázs became the president, and the first half-season; he was the adult-team's manager too. They started in the II/a division of district Kaposvár, and they reached the silver medal up front. Next year, they reached 3rd place, so they could play an internacional friendly with Yugoslavian NK Kutina. In 1991, they get a promising sponsor too, ÖKM, an adult magazine published in Austria. The magazine wanted a football team, to make they product popular in Hungary too. A lot of local entrepreneur stand behind the team too, so financially they could build a very strong team. The big breakthrough was waited till 1994, because a businessman, István Szalai started to support the team. They united with Taszári Honvéd Szőnyi SE, which was playing in the Megye I. In 1996, they get up into the 3rd division, NBIII. In 1999., they got into the last 16 in the National Cup. In the group stage, they were in the group of Paksi SE, Videoton FC, and Hévíz FC. They get through with 2 wins and one drawn. They knocked out Jászberény in the best 32, but in the next round, they were knocked out by Germán SE Tápíószentmárton. In those times, the club had more supporters than Rákóczi. In 1999, the entrepreneurs walked out, and they gave the NBIII place to Kaposvölgye VSC. The club has started the new season in the right of Kaposfüred II in the district II. The club was renamed, the new name was "Kaposfüred Sport Club". Since those times, Kaposfüred is commuting inside Megye II and Megye III, but they have one of the best youth configuration in the Megye I/II/III. In 2015, Gyula Balázs died, Péter Vincze became the new chairman.

== Kaposfüredi Párducok ==
Since 2014., the club has a women's football team too, named 'Kaposfüredi Párducok'.

== List of managers ==
1987; 1990–1996 Gyula Balázs

1987–1988 Vilmos Vörös

1988–1989 János Horváth

1996–1997 Viktor Petrók

1997–2000 Jenő Baksa

2000–2003 Tamás Törzsök

2003–2005 László Szöts

2005–2007 László Tallián

2007–2009 Zoltán Szentgróti

2009–2013 Zsolt Vejki

2013 Csaba Szabó

2014 Szilveszter Spilák

2014– Gábor Pál

== League history ==
Year	League	Division	Finish
1994–95	Somogy megyei I. osztály	4th	15th place
1995–96	Somogy megyei I. osztály	4th	1st place
1996–97	NB III (Dráva Csoport)	3rd	16th place
1997–98	NB III (Dráva Csoport)	3rd	8th place
1998–99	NB III (Dráva Csoport)	3rd	3rd place
1999–2000	Somogy megyei III. osztály (Kaposvári körzet 2. osztály)	8th	1st place
2000–01	Somogy megyei III. osztály (Kaposvári csoport)	7th	9th place
2001–02	Somogy megyei III. osztály (Kaposvári csoport)	7th	3rd place
2002–03	Somogy megyei III. osztály (Kaposvári csoport)	7th	5th place
2003–04	Somogy megyei III. osztály (Kaposvári csoport)	7th	3rd place
2004–05	Somogy megyei III. osztály (Kaposvári csoport)	7th	4th place
2005–06	Somogy megyei III. osztály (Kaposvári csoport)	6th	2nd place
2006–07	Somogy megyei II. osztály (Group South)	5th	15th place
2007–08	Somogy megyei III. osztály (Group Kapos)	6th	2nd place
2008–09	Somogy megyei II. osztály (Group South)	5th	9th place
2009–10	Somogy megyei II. osztály (Group South)	5th	13th place
2010–11	Somogy megyei III. osztály (Group West)	6th	3rd place
2011–12	Somogy megyei II. osztály (Group South)	5th	7th place
2012–13	Somogy megyei II. osztály (Group North)	5th	9th place
2013–14	Somogy megyei II. osztály (Group North)	5th	15th place
2014–15	Somogy megyei III. osztály (Group North))	6th	4th place
2015–16	Somogy megyei III. osztály (Group North))	6th	1st place
2016–17	Somogy megyei II. osztály (Group South))	5th	8th place
2017–18	Somogy megyei II. osztály (Group South)	5th	#

== Honours ==
- Megye I: 1996.
- Megye III: 2000. 2016.
