= 2002–03 Nemzeti Bajnokság III =

Nemzeti Bajnokság III
- Season: 2002–03
- Champions: Bodajk FC (West); FC Dabas (Center); Kertárosi FC (East)
- Promoted: Bodajk FC (West); FC Dabas (Center); Vác VLSE (Center); Kertárosi FC (East); FC Szeged (East)

The 2002–03 Nemzeti Bajnokság III season was the 21st edition of the Nemzeti Bajnokság III.

== League tables ==
=== Western group ===
==== Preliminary phase ====
| Pos | Team | Pld | W | D | L | GF | GA | GD | Pts |
|---|---|---|---|---|---|---|---|---|---|
| 1 | Balatonlelle SE | 22 | 12 | 4 | 6 | 37 | 29 | +8 | 40 |
| 2 | Szekszárdi UFC | 22 | 11 | 6 | 5 | 41 | 20 | +21 | 39 |
| 3 | Bodajk FC | 22 | 10 | 8 | 4 | 46 | 27 | +19 | 38 |
| 4 | Tatai HAC | 22 | 11 | 4 | 7 | 37 | 28 | +9 | 37 |
| 5 | Sárvári FC | 22 | 9 | 9 | 4 | 54 | 28 | +26 | 36 |
| 6 | Komlói Bányász SK | 22 | 10 | 5 | 7 | 33 | 29 | +4 | 35 |
| 7 | Veszprém LC | 22 | 8 | 10 | 4 | 26 | 18 | +8 | 34 |
| 8 | Marcali IFC | 22 | 9 | 7 | 6 | 23 | 18 | +5 | 34 |
| 9 | Mosonmagyaróvári TE | 22 | 6 | 7 | 9 | 30 | 28 | +2 | 25 |
| 10 | Petőháza SE | 22 | 6 | 6 | 10 | 25 | 37 | −12 | 24 |
| 11 | Kaposvölgye VSC | 22 | 4 | 4 | 14 | 19 | 49 | −30 | 16 |
| 12 | Pécsi VSK | 22 | 0 | 2 | 20 | 8 | 68 | −60 | 2 |

==== Main phase ====
| Pos | Team | Pld | W | D | L | GF | GA | GD | Pts | Promotion or relegation |
|---|---|---|---|---|---|---|---|---|---|---|
| 1 | Bodajk FC | 32 | 17 | 11 | 4 | 69 | 31 | +38 | 62 | Promotion to Nemzeti Bajnokság II |
| 2 | Szekszárdi UFC | 32 | 16 | 9 | 7 | 53 | 32 | +21 | 57 | Relegation to Megyei Bajnokság I |
| 3 | Balatonlelle SE | 32 | 13 | 9 | 10 | 48 | 50 | −2 | 48 | |
| 4 | Komlói Bányász SK | 32 | 12 | 10 | 10 | 43 | 39 | +4 | 46 | |
| 5 | Sárvári FC | 32 | 11 | 13 | 8 | 64 | 39 | +25 | 46 | |
| 6 | Tatai HAC | 32 | 12 | 8 | 12 | 42 | 41 | +1 | 44 | |
| 7 | Marcali IFC | 32 | 14 | 11 | 7 | 39 | 26 | +13 | 53 | |
| 8 | Veszprém LC | 32 | 13 | 12 | 7 | 66 | 30 | +36 | 51 | |
| 9 | Mosonmagyaróvári TE | 32 | 13 | 9 | 10 | 49 | 37 | +12 | 48 | |
| 10 | Petőháza SE | 32 | 10 | 9 | 13 | 41 | 51 | −10 | 39 | Relegation to Megyei Bajnokság I |
| 11 | Kaposvölgye VSC | 32 | 7 | 5 | 20 | 33 | 71 | −38 | 26 | |
| 12 | Pécsi VSK | 32 | 0 | 2 | 30 | 13 | 113 | −100 | 2 | Relegation to Megyei Bajnokság I |

=== Central group ===
==== Preliminary phase ====
| Pos | Team | Pld | W | D | L | GF | GA | GD | Pts |
|---|---|---|---|---|---|---|---|---|---|
| 1 | FC Dabas | 22 | 13 | 5 | 4 | 34 | 19 | +15 | 44 |
| 2 | Budafoki FK | 22 | 12 | 4 | 6 | 30 | 18 | +12 | 40 |
| 3 | Vác VLSE | 22 | 11 | 7 | 4 | 44 | 28 | +16 | 40 |
| 4 | Erzsébeti Spartacus MTK | 22 | 11 | 4 | 7 | 41 | 33 | +8 | 37 |
| 5 | Szigetszentmiklósi TK | 22 | 11 | 3 | 8 | 32 | 26 | +6 | 36 |
| 6 | Dorogi FC | 22 | 10 | 4 | 8 | 21 | 20 | +1 | 34 |
| 7 | Pilisvörösvári LSE | 22 | 8 | 7 | 7 | 32 | 31 | +1 | 31 |
| 8 | Soroksár SC | 22 | 8 | 4 | 10 | 30 | 27 | +3 | 28 |
| 9 | Kistarcsai PFK | 22 | 7 | 6 | 9 | 28 | 38 | −10 | 27 |
| 10 | Kiskunhalasi FC | 22 | 5 | 4 | 13 | 29 | 37 | −8 | 19 |
| 11 | Budakalászi MSE | 22 | 5 | 3 | 14 | 24 | 42 | −18 | 18 |
| 12 | Pénzügyőr SE | 22 | 3 | 5 | 14 | 11 | 37 | −26 | 14 |

==== Main phase ====
| Pos | Team | Pld | W | D | L | GF | GA | GD | Pts | Promotion or relegation |
|---|---|---|---|---|---|---|---|---|---|---|
| 1 | FC Dabas | 32 | 18 | 7 | 7 | 49 | 28 | +21 | 61 | Promotion to Nemzeti Bajnokság II |
| 2 | Vác VLSE | 32 | 15 | 11 | 6 | 56 | 37 | +19 | 56 | Promotion to Nemzeti Bajnokság II |
| 3 | Szigetszentmiklósi TK | 32 | 16 | 4 | 12 | 45 | 37 | +8 | 52 | |
| 4 | Dorogi FC | 32 | 15 | 6 | 11 | 34 | 33 | +1 | 51 | Relegation to Megyei Bajnokság I |
| 5 | Budafoki FK | 32 | 14 | 7 | 11 | 41 | 35 | +6 | 49 | |
| 6 | Erzsébeti Spartacus MTK | 32 | 13 | 6 | 13 | 51 | 48 | +3 | 45 | |
| 7 | Kistarcsa PFK | 32 | 14 | 7 | 11 | 49 | 54 | −5 | 49 | |
| 8 | Soroksár SC | 32 | 13 | 6 | 13 | 46 | 35 | +11 | 45 | |
| 9 | Pilisvörösvári LSE | 32 | 12 | 7 | 13 | 47 | 52 | −5 | 43 | |
| 10 | Budakalászi MSE | 32 | 11 | 4 | 17 | 44 | 58 | −14 | 37 | |
| 11 | Kiskunhalasi FC | 32 | 7 | 5 | 20 | 47 | 64 | −17 | 26 | |
| 12 | Pénzügyőr SE | 32 | 5 | 8 | 19 | 25 | 53 | −28 | 23 | |

=== Eastern group ===
==== Preliminary phase ====
| Pos | Team | Pld | W | D | L | GF | GA | GD | Pts |
|---|---|---|---|---|---|---|---|---|---|
| 1 | Makó FC | 22 | 14 | 3 | 5 | 46 | 25 | +21 | 45 |
| 2 | Nyíregyháza Kertvárosi FC | 22 | 13 | 5 | 4 | 48 | 19 | +29 | 44 |
| 3 | Kazincbarcikai SC | 22 | 11 | 5 | 6 | 58 | 26 | +32 | 38 |
| 4 | Ózdi Kohász | 22 | 11 | 4 | 7 | 54 | 39 | +15 | 37 |
| 5 | FC Szeged | 22 | 10 | 7 | 5 | 35 | 24 | +11 | 37 |
| 6 | Bőcs KSC | 22 | 10 | 2 | 10 | 39 | 46 | −7 | 32 |
| 7 | Orosháza FC | 22 | 9 | 5 | 8 | 36 | 31 | +5 | 32 |
| 8 | Mátészalka FC | 22 | 10 | 2 | 10 | 38 | 38 | 0 | 32 |
| 9 | Gyulai Termál FC | 22 | 8 | 2 | 12 | 25 | 35 | −10 | 26 |
| 10 | Nyírbátor FC | 22 | 7 | 3 | 12 | 29 | 41 | −12 | 24 |
| 11 | Baktalórántháza VSE | 22 | 2 | 12 | 8 | 19 | 35 | −16 | 18 |
| 12 | Tiszaújvárosi FC | 22 | 1 | 2 | 19 | 14 | 82 | −68 | 5 |

==== Main phase ====
| Pos | Team | Pld | W | D | L | GF | GA | GD | Pts | Promotion or relegation |
|---|---|---|---|---|---|---|---|---|---|---|
| 1 | Kertvárosi FC | 32 | 20 | 7 | 5 | 63 | 23 | +40 | 67 | Promotion to Nemzeti Bajnokság II |
| 2 | FC Szeged | 32 | 17 | 7 | 8 | 55 | 31 | +24 | 58 | Promotion to Nemzeti Bajnokság II |
| 3 | Kazincbarcikai SC | 32 | 16 | 7 | 9 | 71 | 32 | +39 | 55 | |
| 4 | Makó FC | 32 | 16 | 5 | 11 | 55 | 41 | +14 | 53 | |
| 5 | Ózdi Kohász | 32 | 15 | 6 | 11 | 65 | 52 | +13 | 51 | |
| 6 | Bőcs KSC | 32 | 11 | 2 | 19 | 50 | 79 | −29 | 35 | Relegation to Megyei Bajnokság I |
| 7 | Mátészalka FC | 32 | 15 | 5 | 12 | 67 | 53 | +14 | 50 | |
| 8 | Orosháza FC | 32 | 12 | 9 | 11 | 54 | 44 | +10 | 45 | |
| 9 | Gyulai Termál FC | 32 | 12 | 3 | 17 | 48 | 58 | −10 | 39 | |
| 10 | Nyírbátor FC | 32 | 11 | 6 | 15 | 56 | 61 | −5 | 39 | Relegation to Megyei Bajnokság I |
| 11 | Baktalórántháza VSE | 32 | 7 | 17 | 8 | 37 | 44 | −7 | 38 | |
| 12 | Tiszaújvárosi FC | 32 | 2 | 2 | 28 | 28 | 131 | −103 | 8 | Relegation to Megyei Bajnokság I |

== See also ==
- 2002–03 Magyar Kupa
- 2002–03 Nemzeti Bajnokság I
- 2002–03 Nemzeti Bajnokság II
