= Kaposfüred =

Kaposvár-Kaposfüred
- Quarter
- Nickname: Füred
- Location of Kaposfüred
- Coordinates: 46.36383°N 17.78225°E
- Country: Hungary
- County: Somogy

Population (2001)
  - Total: 2,402
- Time zone: UTC+1 (CET)
  - Summer (DST): UTC+2 (CEST)
- Postal code: 7400
- Area code: 82
- Website: www.kaposfured.hu

Kaposfüred (officially known as Kaposvár-Kaposfüred) is located on the north side of Kaposvár. Before 1970, it was an independent village.

== History ==
The first written documents of the existence of the city are from 1192, when Béla III of Hungary staked out the borders of Kaposvár. In those times, it was the lordship of the abbey of Somogyvár, founded by László I of Hungary. In 1390, it was mentioned by the name of Fired, then, and in 1439, it was called Fyred in royal documents. For few years, it was owned by Bálint Török, in the 16th century.

== Sports ==
Kapsfüred has an ex-third-division club, Kaposfüred SC, which is currently playing in Somogy county's 3rd league.
