= 2001–02 Nemzeti Bajnokság III =

Nemzeti Bajnokság III
- Season: 2001–02
- Champions: Bodajk SE (West); Balassagyarmati SE-Nógrád Volán (Center); Demecser FC (East)
- Promoted: Balassagyarmati SE-Nógrád Volán (Center); Demecser FC (East)

The 2001–02 Nemzeti Bajnokság III season was the 20th edition of the Nemzeti Bajnokság III.

== League tables ==
=== Western group ===
Pos	Team	Pld	W	D	L	GF	GA	GD	Pts	Relegation
1	Bodajk SE	24	14	8	2	41	14	+27	50	
2	Tatai HAC	24	13	6	5	39	24	+15	45	
3	Petőházi SE	24	10	9	5	35	17	+18	39	
4	Kaposvölgye VSC	24	11	6	7	29	31	−2	39	
5	Sárvári FC	24	10	8	6	36	25	+11	38	
6	Balatonlelle SE	24	9	9	6	31	25	+6	36	
7	Mosonmagyaróvári TE	24	9	7	8	50	36	+14	34	
8	Veszprém LC	24	7	8	9	25	27	−2	29	
9	Pécsi VSK	24	6	7	11	36	37	−1	25	
10	Komlói Bányász SK	24	7	4	13	22	37	−15	25	
11	Balatonfüredi FC	24	4	12	8	24	39	−15	24	Relegation to Megyei Bajnokság I
12	FC Ajka	24	4	9	11	29	42	−13	21	Relegation to Megyei Bajnokság I
13	Bonyhád VLC	24	4	3	17	19	62	−43	15	Relegation to Megyei Bajnokság I

=== Central group ===
Pos	Team	Pld	W	D	L	GF	GA	GD	Pts	Promotion or relegation
1	Balassagyarmati SE-Nógrád Volán	22	13	5	4	41	26	+15	44	Promotion to Nemzeti Bajnokság II
2	Kistarcsa	22	12	4	6	41	24	+17	40	
3	Soroksár-Csepel	22	11	6	5	26	25	+1	39	
4	Pilisvörösvári LSE	22	10	6	6	35	21	+14	36	
5	Szigetszentmiklósi TK	22	9	4	9	28	26	+2	31	
6	Budakalászi MSE	22	8	6	8	29	38	−9	30	
7	Budafoki FK	22	7	8	7	22	24	−2	29	
8	Váci VLSE	22	8	4	10	37	31	+6	28	
9	Kiskunhalasi FC	22	7	7	8	29	30	−1	28	
10	Diego FC Dabas	22	8	3	11	24	32	−8	27	
11	Bajai LSE	22	5	2	15	28	45	−17	17	Relegation to Megyei Bajnokság I
12	Pénzügyőr SE	22	4	5	13	26	44	−18	17	
13	Kiskunfélegyházi TK (Note: Withdrew)	0	0	0	0	0	0	0	0	

=== Eastern group ===
Pos	Team	Pld	W	D	L	GF	GA	GD	Pts	Promotion or relegation
1	Demecser FC	24	14	3	7	45	37	+8	45	Promotion to Nemzeti Bajnokság II
2	Kazincbarcikai SC	24	12	8	4	46	22	+24	44	
3	Makó FC	24	12	7	5	46	32	+14	43	
4	FC Tiszaújváros	24	11	8	5	44	30	+14	41	
5	Bőcs KSC	24	10	9	5	52	36	+16	39	
6	Orosháza FC	24	12	5	7	44	27	+17	37 (Note: 4 points deducted)	
7	Mátészalka FC	24	10	7	7	40	33	+7	37	
8	Jászberényi SE	24	9	4	11	29	35	−6	31	
9	FC Szeged	24	8	6	10	27	34	−7	30	
10	Nyírbátori FC	24	8	3	13	35	45	−10	27	
11	Gyulai Termál FC	24	6	4	14	25	43	−18	22	
12	Karcagi SE	24	5	5	14	23	50	−27	20	Relegation to Megyei Bajnokság I
13	Baktalórántháza VSE	24	3	3	18	26	58	−32	12	

== See also ==
- 2001–02 Magyar Kupa
- 2001–02 Nemzeti Bajnokság I
- 2001–02 Nemzeti Bajnokság II
