= Bodajk SE =

Hungarian football club

- Full name: Bodajk Sport Egyesület
- Founded: 1947
Home colours

Bodajk Sport Egyesület is a professional football club based in Bodajk, Fejér County, Hungary.

== History ==
After World War II and all the way until 1999, the team competed only at the county level, often going by the name Bányász. At the turn of the millennium, the team first advanced to Nemzeti Bajnokság III—the fourth division at that time—and then moved up to the third division. Starting in 2001, Bodajk played in Nemzeti Bajnokság II, which was the third division at the time, but in the 2003–2004 and 2004–2005 seasons, the club also competed in NB I/B, the second division at the time. The team's recent success came under Ferenc Nemes; at that time, the club became a partner club of MTK Budapest FC, and “stars” such as József Kanta, Gábor Bori, Zoltán Pollák, and István Rodenbücher played there, while the coach was Teodoru Vaszilisz, also known as “Uncle Ciki.”

The partnership lasted three years; after it was terminated, BFC Siófok purchased the Bodajk municipality's share, and Nemes moved the club to the city, with Bodajk restarting in the county's third division. Interestingly, until 2011, the “BFC” in the name “BFC Siófok” stood for Bodajk FC, meaning that, in name at least, Bodajk soccer had reached the Nemzeti Bajnokság I—albeit on the shores of Lake Balaton.

So, starting in 2005, soccer in Bodajk was once again played at the county level; the team competed in the sixth division until 2011, followed by a few years in the fifth division, and then six seasons in the county's First Division starting in 2020, from which the team was relegated last year. An immediate return after relegation is certainly out of the question; the club entered the 14th round of the Fejér County Division II North Group in last (12th) place, facing neighboring Fehérvárcsurgó SE.

== Name changes ==
- Bodajk: 1947 – 1949
- Bodajki Tárna: 1949 – ?
- Bodajki SK: ? – 1967?
- Bodajk-Balinkai Bányász: 1967? – ?
- Bodajk SE: ? – 2002
- Bodajk FC: 2002 – ?
- 2005: participates with the rights of BFC-Siófok
- Bodajk SE: ? –

== Honours ==
=== League ===
- Nemzeti Bajnokság III:
  - Winners (2): 2001–02, 2002–03

== Seasons ==
As of 18 October 2026.

Season	Tier	Club's name	Position	Pts
1948–49	5	Bodajk	5 / 8	10
1949–50	5	Bodajki Tárna	3 / 9	20
1957	5	Bodajk	4 / 7	13
1957–58	5	Bodajk	2 / 12	17
1965	6	Bodajki SK	1 / 9	31
1966	5	Bodajk	11 / 14	20
1967	5	Bodajk	4 / 16	34
1968	5	Bodajk	7 / 14	23
1969	5	Bodajk	11 / 14	18
1970	6	Bodajk	6 / 16	18
1970–71	6	Bodajk-Balinkai Bányász	2 / 16	32
1971–72	5	Balinkai Bányász	16 / 16	7
1972–73	6	Bodajk	12 / 16	19
1973–74	7	Bodajk	1 / 11	23
1974–75	5	Bodajk	12 / 16	27
1975–76	5	Bodajk	12 / 17	27
1976–77	5	Bodajk	15 / 16	14
1977–78	5	Bodajk	6 / 11	19
1978–79	4	Bodajk	9 / 14	26
1979–80	4	Bodajk	12 / 13	8
1980–81	4	Bodajk	7 / 11	21
1981–82	5	Bodajk	7 / 11	13
1982–83	5	Bodajk	1 / 12	29
1983–84	5	Bodajk	1 / 11	36
1984–85	5	Bodajk	5 / 9	15
1985–86	5	Bodajk	4 / 8	17
1986–87	5	Bodajk	14 / 14	12
1987–88	6	Bodajk	1 / 9	25
1988–89	5	Bodajk	15 / 16	26
1989–90	6	Bodajk	6 / 14	28
1990–91	6	Bodajk	7 / 16	38
1991–92	6	Bodajk	13 / 19	31
1992–93	6	Bodajk	7 / 22	16
1992–93	6	Bodajk	5 / 11	22
1993–94	6	Bodajk	1 / 14	45
1994–95	5	Bodajk SE	1 / 16	72
1995–96	4	Bodajk SE	14 / 16	23
1996–97	5	Bodajk	1 / 16	85
1997–98	5	Bodajk	4 / 16	57
1998–99	5	Bodajk	1 / 16	82
1999–00	4	Bodajk SE	5 / 16	47
2000	3	Bodajk SE	4 / 8	25
2000–01	4	Bodajk SE	2 / 10	46
2001–02	3	Bodajk SE	1 / 13	50
2002–03	3	Bodajk FC	1 / 12	62
2002–03	3	Bodajk FC	3 / 12	38
2003–04	2	Bodajk FC	11 / 18	45
2004–05	2	Bodajk FC	9 / 14	32
2005–06	6	Bodajk	9 / 14	38
2006–07	6	Bodajk SE	12 / 14	25
2007–08	6	Bodajk	8 / 14	33
2008–09	6	Bodajk	3 / 13	51
2009–10	6	Bodajk SE	4 / 14	50
2010–11	6	Bodajk SE	1 / 14	56
2011–12	5	Bodajk	6 / 16	47
2012–13	5	Bodajk SE	14 / 16	28
2013–14	5	Bodajk SE	5 / 16	57
2014–15	5	Bodajk SE	3 / 16	53
2015–16	5	Bodajk SE	7 / 16	39
2016–17	5	Bodajk SE	8 / 16	41
2017–18	5	Bodajk SE	3 / 16	62
2018–19	5	Bodajk SE	3 / 16	62
2019–20	4	Bodajk SE	10 / 14	13
2020–21	4	Bodajk SE	6 / 15	45
2021–22	4	Bodajk SE	7 / 14	36
2022–23	4	Bodajk SE	12 / 15	25
2023–24	4	Bodajk SE	15 / 15	7
2024–25	4	Bodajk SE	13 / 14	5
2025–26	5	Bodajk SE	12 / 12	16
