= Demecser =

- Flag Coat of arms

- Location within Hungary
- Coordinates: 48°07′N 21°55′E
- Country: Hungary
- County: Szabolcs-Szatmár-Bereg

Area
  - Total: 36.99 km^{2} (14.28 sq mi)

Population (2015)
  - Total: 4,205
  - Density: 113.7/km^{2} (294/sq mi)
- Time zone: UTC+1 (CET)
  - Summer (DST): UTC+2 (CEST)
- Postal code: 4516
- Area code: 42

Demecser is a town in Szabolcs-Szatmár-Bereg county, in the Northern Great Plain region of eastern Hungary.

== Geography ==
It covers an area of 36.99 km^{2} (14 sq mi) and has a population of 4205 people (2015).

== Sport ==
- Demecseri KSE
