= 2003–04 Nemzeti Bajnokság II =

Nemzeti Bajnokság II
- Season: 2003–04
- Champions: Budapest Honvéd FC
- Promoted: Budapest Honvéd FC; Vasas SC; Kaposvári Rákóczi FC; Diósgyőri VTK; Nyíregyháza Spartacus FC; Pápai FC
- Relegated: Balassagyarmati VSE; Dabas–Gyón FC

The 2003–04 Nemzeti Bajnokság II was the 106th season of the Nemzeti Bajnokság II, the second tier of the Hungarian football league.

== League Table ==
Pos	Team	Pld	W	D	L	GF	GA	GD	Pts	Promotion or relegation
1	Budapest Honvéd FC	34	23	6	5	75	24	+51	75	Promotion to Nemzeti Bajnokság I
2	Budapesti Vasas	34	18	8	8	57	36	+21	62	Promotion to Nemzeti Bajnokság I
3	NABI-Kaposvári Rákóczi FC	34	18	7	9	54	33	+21	61	Promotion to Nemzeti Bajnokság I
4	Diósgyőri VTK	34	17	6	11	54	44	+10	57	Promotion to Nemzeti Bajnokság I
5	Nyíregyháza Spartacus FC	34	16	8	10	40	36	+4	56	Promotion to Nemzeti Bajnokság I
6	Rákospalotai EAC	34	14	10	10	46	38	+8	52	
7	BKV Előre	34	15	6	13	40	36	+4	51	
8	Balassagyarmati SE	34	12	12	10	38	35	+3	48	Relegation
9	FC Tatabánya-Auto Trader	34	13	7	14	46	43	+3	46	
10	Pápai Termál PELC	34	12	10	12	48	55	−7	46	Promotion to Nemzeti Bajnokság I
11	Bodajk FC	34	14	3	17	50	50	0	45	
12	Kecskeméti TE	34	10	12	12	33	33	0	42	
13	FC Szeged	34	12	2	20	45	66	−21	38	
14	Dunakanyar-Vác FC	34	10	8	16	39	54	−15	38	
15	Szolnoki MÁV FC	34	10	7	17	42	44	−2	37	
16	Dunaújváros FC	34	9	10	15	40	52	−12	37	
17	Dabas FC	34	8	9	17	37	61	−24	33	Relegation
18	Hévíz FC	34	5	9	20	34	78	−44	24	

== See also ==
- 2003–04 Magyar Kupa
- 2003–04 Nemzeti Bajnokság I
- 2003–04 Nemzeti Bajnokság III
