= Demecseri KSE =

Hungarian football club

- Full name: Demecseri Kinizsi Sport Egyesület
- Founded: 1949
- Ground: Demecseri Városi Sporttelep
- League: Megyei Bajnokság I
Home colours

Demecseri Kinizsi Sportegyesület is a professional football club based in Demecser, Szabolcs–Szatmár–Bereg County, Hungary, that competes in the Megyei Bajnokság I, the fourth tier of Hungarian football.

== History ==
Demecser won the 1997–98 Nemzeti Bajnokság III season and were promoted to the second division.

Demecser won their second second division title in 2002 by winning the 2001–02 Nemzeti Bajnokság III season.

== Name changes ==
- Demecseri Szikra: 1948 - ?
- Demecseri MSE: ? - 1948
- Demecseri Ipartelepek SzSE: 1948 - 1950
- Demecseri Lombik: 1950 - 1951
- Demecseri Szikra: 1951 - 1953
- Demecseri Kinizsi SK: 1953 - ?
- Demecseri Kinizsi SE: ? - 1999
- Demecseri FC: 1999 - ?
- Demecseri SE: ? - 2013
- Demecseri VKSE: 2013 - 2020
- Demecseri Kinizsi SE: 2023 -

== Honours ==
=== League ===
- Nemzeti Bajnokság III:
  - Winners (2): 1997–98, 2001–02

== Seasons ==
The table below shows the Demecseri KSE's seasons.

Season	Tier	Club's name	Position	Pts
1946–47	4	Demecseri MSE	2 / 6	14
1947–48	4	Demecseri MSE	4 / 11	18
1948–49	4	Demecseri Ipartelepek SzSE	8 / 14	24
1949–50	4	Demecseri Ipartelepek SzSE	1 / 16	46
1950	3	Demecseri Lombik	7 / 17	15
1951	3	Demecseri Szikra	10 / 14	22
1952	3	Demecseri Szikra	13 / 14	18
1953	3	Demecseri Szikra	5 / 14	33
1954	3	Demecseri Szikra	7 / 14	27
1955	3	Demecseri Kinizsi	15 / 16	20
1956	4	Demecseri Kinizsi	6 / 14	24
1957	4	Demecser	2 / 10	25
1957–58	4	Demecseri Kinizsi	9 / 14	23
1958–59	4	Demecseri Kinizsi	12 / 16	21
1959–60	4	Demecseri Kinizsi	16 / 16	8
1960–61	5	Demecser	7 / 14	28
1961–62	5	Demecser	5 / 12	22
1962–63	5	Demecser	12 / 14	16
1964	6	Demecser	4 / 16	34
1965	6	Demecseri Kinizsi	12 / 16	22
1966	6	Demecser	3 / 14	34
1967	6	Demecser	11 / 14	22
1968	6	Demecser	7 / 14	28
1969	6	Demecseri Kinizsi	6 / 14	28
1970	6	Demecseri Kinizsi	5 / 8	15
1970–71	6	Demecseri Kinizsi	9 / 16	31
1971–72	6	Demecseri Kinizsi	5 / 16	28
1972–73	6	Demecseri Kinizsi	5 / 16	36
1973–74	6	Demecseri Kinizsi	6 / 16	34
1974–75	5	Demecseri Kinizsi	10 / 16	26
1975–76	5	Demecseri Kinizsi	11 / 16	27
1976–77	5	Demecseri Kinizsi	16 / 16	20
1977–78	6	Demecseri Kinizsi	1 / 15	44
1978–79	5	Demecseri Kinizsi	5 / 16	21
1979–80	5	Demecseri Kinizsi	1 / 11	34
1980–81	5	Demecseri Kinizsi	3 / 16	42
1981–82	5	Demecseri Kinizsi	1 / 16	42
1982–83	4	Demecseri Kinizsi	16 / 18	28
1983–84	5	Demecser	5 / 16	38
1984–85	5	Demecser	7 / 18	39
1985–86	6	Demecser	11 / 16	27
1986–87	6	Demecser	1 / 16	47
1987–88	6	Demecser	6 / 16	35
1988–89	6	Demecser	4 / 16	38
1989–90	6	Demecser	6 / 16	21
1990–91	6	Demecser	4 / 16	41
1991–92	6	Demecser	4 / 16	24
1992–93	6	Demecser	3 / 16	40
1993–94	6	Demecser	3 / 17	54
1994–95	5	Demecser	1 / 14	62
1995–96	4	Demecseri Kinizsi SE	1 / 16	74
1996–97	3	Demecseri Kinizsi	2 / 16	63
1997–98	3	Demecseri Kinizsi SE	1 / 16	62
1998–99	2	Demecseri Kinizsi SE	15 / 20	45
1999–00	2	Demecseri FC	18 / 20	30
2000	3	Demecser FC	2 / 8	26
2000–01	3	Demecser FC	7 / 12	27
2001–02	3	Demecser FC	1 / 13	45
2002–03	2	Demecseri FC	20 / 20	-
2004–05	7	Demecser FC	1 / 12	63
2005–06	5	Demecser	2 / 16	67
2006–07	5	Demecser KVSE	5 / 16	50
2007–08	5	Demecser SE	1 / 16	75
2008–09	4	Demecser SE	16 / 16	14
2009–10	5	Demecseri SE	8 / 16	40
2010–11	5	Demecseri SE	10 / 16	38
2011–12	5	Demecseri SE	14 / 16	22
2012–13	5	Demecseri SE	8 / 16	45
2013–14	5	Demecseri VKSE	13 / 16	35
2014–15	5	Demecseri VKSE	7 / 16	48
2015–16	5	Demecseri VKSE	8 / 16	42
2016–17	5	Demecseri VKSE	5 / 16	45
2017–18	5	Demecseri VKSE	7 / 16	45
2018–19	5	Demecseri VKSE	9 / 16	36
2019–20	5	Demecseri VKSE	6 / 16	23
2023–24	6	Demecseri Kinizsi SE	8 / 14	40
2024–25	6	Demecseri Kinizsi SE	3 / 13	47
2025–26	6	Demecseri Kinizsi SE	4 / 14	49
