= Balassagyarmati VSE =

Hungarian football club

- Full name: Balassagyarmati Városi Sportegyesület
- Founded: 12 March 1902; 124 years ago
- Ground: Kövi Pál Sports Centre
- Capacity: 3,100
- League: NB III (East)
- 2020–21: NB III, East, 7th
- Website: http://www.bse1902.gportal.hu/
Home colours

Balassagyarmati Városi Sportegyesület is a professional football club based in Balassagyarmat, Nógrád County, Hungary, that competes in the Nemzeti Bajnokság III, the third tier of Hungarian football.

== History ==
Balassagyarmat won the Nógrád group of the 2016–17 Megyei Bajnokság I season and were promoted to the third division.

Balassagyarmat is going to compete in the 2017–18 Nemzeti Bajnokság III.

== Honours ==
=== Domestic ===
- Nógrád Megyei I:
  - Winner (2): 2016–17, 2018–19

== Season results ==
As of 17 October 2026.

Season	Tier	Club's name	Position	Pts
1910–11	2	Balassagyarmati SE	3 / 3	0
1920–21	2	Balassagyarmati TE	2 / 6	13
1921–22	2	Balassagyarmati TE	8 / 8	
1928–29	3	Balasssagyarmati SE	4 / 9	20
1929–30	3	Balassagyarmati TE	4 / 9	17
1930–31	3	Balassagyarmati TE	1 / 10	31
1931–32	2	Balassagyarmati TE	4 / 11	27
1932–33	2	Balassagyarmati TSE	7 / 14	27
1933–34	2	Balassagyarmati TSE	7 / 12	20
1934–35	2	Balassagyarmati TSE	9 / 12	18
1935–36	2	Balassa TSE	12 / 12	7
1936–37	3	Balassa TSE	2 / 10	21
1937–38	2	Balassa TSE	3 / 12	28
1938–39	3	Balassagyarmati TSE	7 / 12	19
1939–40	3	Balassa TSE	9 / 12	21
1940–41	4	Balassa TSE	3 / 10	22
1941–42	3	Balassagyarmati TSE	14 / 16	21
1942–43	3	Balassagyarmati TSE	12 / 14	18
1943–44	3	Balassagyarmati TSE	9 / 14	25
1944–45	2	Balassa TSE	16 / 16	2
1944–45	3	Balassa TSE	0 / 11	
1969	5	Balassagyarmati SE	1 / 16	52
1970	4	Balassagyarmati SE	14 / 16	10
1970–71	4	Balassagyarmati SE	4 / 16	31
1971–72	4	Balassagyarmati SE	5 / 16	32
1972–73	4	Balassagyarmati SE	5 / 16	29
1973–74	4	Balassagyarmati SE	9 / 16	26
1974–75	4	Balassagyarmati SE	1 / 16	51
1975–76	3	Balassagyarmati SE	12 / 20	39
1976–77	3	Balassagyarmati SE	9 / 20	36
1977–78	3	Balassagyarmati SE	4 / 20	48
1978–79	2	Balassagyarmati SE	11 / 19	36
1979–80	2	Balassagyarmati SE	16 / 20	34
1980–81	2	Balassagyarmati SE	4 / 20	45
1981–82	2	Balassagyarmati SE	10 / 16	27
1982–83	3	Balassagyarmati SE	8 / 16	29
1983–84	3	Balassagyarmati SE	15 / 16	24
1984–85	4	Balassagyarmati SE	1 / 16	48
1985–86	3	Balassagyarmati SE	15 / 17	21
1986–87	4	Balassagyarmati HVSE	1 / 16	51
1987–88	3	Balassagyarmati HVSE	13 / 16	26
1988–89	3	Balassagyarmati HVSE	7 / 16	47
1989–90	3	Balassagyarmati HVSE	11 / 16	38
1990–91	3	Balassagyarmati HVSE	8 / 16	30
1991–92	3	Balassagyarmati HVSE	13 / 16	23
1992–93	3	Balassagyarmati LC	8 / 16	32
1993–94	3	Balassagyarmati LC	13 / 16	24
1994–95	3	Balassagyarmati LC	15 / 16	14
1995–96	4	Balassagyarmati SE-Nógrád Volán	8 / 16	36
1996–97	4	Balassagyarmati SE-Nógrád Volán	2 / 16	74
1997–98	4	Balassagyarmati SE-Nógrád Volán	9 / 16	39
1998–99	4	Balassagyarmati SE-Nógrád Volán	12 / 16	32
1999–00	4	Balassagyarmati SE-Nógrád Volán	4 / 16	49
2000	3	Balassagyarmati SE-Nógrád Volán	1 / 8	35
2000–01	3	Balassagyarmati SE-Nógrád Volán	3 / 12	35
2001–02	3	Balassagyarmati SE-Nógrád Volán	1 / 13	44
2002–03	2	Balassagyarmati SE-Goldex-Anettka	13 / 20	40
2003–04	2	Balassagyarmati SE	8 / 18	48
2004–05	4	Balassagyarmati SE	5 / 14	42
2005–06	4	Balassagyarmati VSE-Nógrád Volán	1 / 18	94
2006–07	3	Balassagyarmati VSE-Nógrád Volán	9 / 14	33
2007–08	3	Balassagyarmati VSE-Nógrád Volán	10 / 16	38
2008–09	3	Balassagyarmati VSE-Nógrád Volán	13 / 16	34
2009–10	3	Balassagyarmati VSE-Nógrád Volán	6 / 14	41
2010–11	3	Balassagyarmati VSE	15 / 16	24
2011–12	3	Balassagyarmati VSE	14 / 15	13
2012–13	4	Balassagyarmati VSE	4 / 15	52
2013–14	4	Balassagyarmati VSE	12 / 16	30
2014–15	4	Balassagyarmati VSE	4 / 14	48
2015–16	4	Balassagyarmati VSE	4 / 14	57
2016–17	4	Balassagyarmati VSE	1 / 14	66
2017–18	3	Balassagyarmati VSE	14 / 16	25
2018–19	4	Balassagyarmati VSE	1 / 11	65
2019–20	3	Balassagyarmati VSE	9 / 16	24
2020–21	3	Balassagyarmati VSE	7 / 20	64
2021–22	3	Balassagyarmati VSE	2 / 20	81
2022–23	3	Balassagyarmati VSE	0 / 20	
2023–24	5	Balassagyarmati VSE	2 / 15	61
2024–25	4	Balassagyarmati VSE-Kék ABC	12 / 13	10
2025–26	4	Balassagyarmati VSE	14 / 14	
