= Kalocsai FC =

Hungarian football club

- Full name: Kalocsai Futball Club
- Founded: 1913; 113 years ago
- Ground: Városi Sporttelep
- Website: https://www.kalocsaifc.hu/
Home colours	Away colours

Kalocsai Futball Club is a professional football club based in Kalocsa, Bács-Kiskun County, Hungary, that competes in the Bács-Kiskun county league.

== Name changes ==
- 1913–?: Kalocsai SC
- ?-1949: Kalocsai SE
- 1949–1951: Kalocsai SzSE
- 1951–1966: Kalocsai Kinizsi SK
- 1966: merger with Kalocsai Spartacus
- 1966–1975: Kalocsai VTSK
- 1975–1991: Kalocsai SE
- 1991–2023: Kalocsai Futball Club
- 2023 –present: ANDA Kalocsai Futball Club

== History ==
On 1 September 2024, József Vaskó was appointed as the manager of Kalocsa.

== Honours ==
- Nemzeti Bajnokság III:
  - Third place (2): 1993–94, 1996–97
- Szabadföld Kupa
  - Runners-up (1): 1993

== Seasons ==
The table below shows the seasons of Kalocsai FC.

Season	Tier	Club's name	Position	Pts
1932–33	2	Kalocsai FC	6 / 11	20
1933–34	2	Kalocsai FC	8 / 10	10
1937–38	2	Kalocsai SC	9 / 12	16
1938–39	3	Kalocsai SC	6 / 12	26
1939–40	3	Kalocsai SC	2 / 12	33
1940–41	4	Kalocsai SC	3 / 9	8
1941–42	4	Kalocsai SC	10 / 14	8
1945–46	3	Kalocsai SE	6 / 7	4
1946–47	4	Kalocsai SE	0 / 4	
1948–49	4	Kalocsai SE	10 / 14	22
1949–50	4	Kalocsai SzSE	1 / 14	42
1950	3	Kalocsai SzSE	12 / 16	11
1951	3	Kalocsai Kinizsi	9 / 12	14
1952	3	Kalocsai Kinizsi	9 / 14	27
1953	3	Kalocsai Kinizsi	7 / 12	17
1954	3	Kalocsai Kinizsi	12 / 14	16
1955	3	Kalocsai Kinizsi	13 / 14	12
1956	4	Kalocsai Kinizsi	3 / 12	26
1957	4	Kalocsai SE	1 / 9	23
1957–58	4	Kalocsa	8 / 16	31
1958–59	4	Kalocsa	11 / 16	26
1959–60	4	Kalocsai Kinizsi	3 / 16	40
1960–61	4	Kalocsai Kinizsi	6 / 16	32
1961–62	4	Kalocsai Kinizsi	1 / 17	48
1962–63	3	Kalocsai Kinizsi	10 / 16	26
1963	4	Kalocsai Kinizsi	16 / 16	8
1964	4	Kalocsai Kinizsi	5 / 16	33
1965	4	Kalocsai Kinizsi	12 / 16	27
1966	4	Kalocsai VTSK	12 / 16	25
1967	4	Kalocsai VTSK	8 / 16	31
1968	4	Kalocsai VTSK	9 / 16	28
1969	4	Kalocsai VTSK	14 / 16	23
1970	5	Kalocsai VTSK	4 / 16	20
1970–71	5	Kalocsai VTSK	2 / 16	45
1971–72	5	Kalocsai VTSK	2 / 18	45
1972–73	5	Kalocsai VTSK	1 / 17	44
1973–74	4	Kalocsai VTSK	14 / 16	14
1974–75	4	Kalocsai VTSK	1 / 18	53
1975–76	3	Kalocsai SE	16 / 20	29
1976–77	4	Kalocsai SE	5 / 20	45
1977–78	4	Kalocsai SE	7 / 20	43
1978–79	3	Kalocsai SE	9 / 20	42
1979–80	3	Kalocsai SE	5 / 18	40
1980–81	3	Kalocsai SE	8 / 18	37
1981–82	4	Kalocsai SE	5 / 16	36
1982–83	4	Kalocsai SE	4 / 16	36
1983–84	4	Kalocsai SE	7 / 16	31
1984–85	4	Kalocsai SE	7 / 16	34
1985–86	4	Kalocsai SE	4 / 16	34
1986–87	4	Kalocsai SE	1 / 17	50
1987–88	3	Kalocsai SE	15 / 16	18
1988–89	4	Kalocsai SE	3 / 16	38
1989–90	4	Kalocsai SE	7 / 16	44
1990–91	4	Kalocsai SE	7 / 16	31
1991–92	4	Kalocsai FC	3 / 16	37
1992–93	4	Kalocsai FC	1 / 16	55
1993–94	3	Kalocsai FC	3 / 16	37
1994–95	3	Kalocsai FC	6 / 16	48
1995–96	3	Kalocsai FC	6 / 16	54
1996–97	3	Kalocsai FC	3 / 16	49
1997–98	3	Kalocsai FC	12 / 16	32
1998–99	3	Kalocsai FC	14 / 16	18
1999–00	3	Kalocsai FC	10 / 16	31
2000	3	Kalocsai FC	7 / 8	14
2000–01	4	Kalocsai FC	9 / 11	20
2001–02	4	Kalocsai FC	10 / 13	22
2002–03	5	Kalocsai FC	10 / 16	38
2003–04	5	Kalocsai FC	3 / 16	70
2004–05	5	Kalocsai FC	3 / 16	61
2005–06	4	Kalocsai FC	15 / 16	26
2006–07	4	Kalocsai FC	12 / 16	32
2007–08	4	Kalocsai FC	7 / 16	47
2008–09	4	Kalocsai FC	5 / 15	49
2009–10	4	Kalocsai FC	8 / 16	42
2010–11	4	Kalocsai FC	9 / 16	42
2011–12	4	Kalocsai FC	8 / 13	33
2012–13	4	Kalocsai FC	4 / 13	41
2013–14	4	Kalocsai FC	5 / 16	54
2014–15	4	Kalocsai FC	3 / 15	58
2015–16	4	Kalocsai FC	3 / 15	62
2016–17	4	Kalocsai FC	11 / 15	25
2017–18	4	Kalocsai FC	5 / 13	37
2018–19	4	Kalocsai FC	4 / 14	48
2019–20	4	Kalocsai FC	2 / 15	33
2020–21	4	Kalocsai FC	3 / 15	55
2021–22	4	Kalocsai FC	9 / 13	28
2022–23	4	ANDA Kalocsai FC	13 / 14	25
2023–24	4	ANDA Kalocsai FC	9 / 15	39
2024–25	4	ANDA Kalocsai FC	9 / 16	44
2025–26	4	ANDA Kalocsai FC	10 / 16	43
