= Százhalombattai LK =

Hungarian football club

- Full name: Százhalombattai Labdarúgó Klub
- Founded: 1965
- Website: https://vuk-se.hu/
Home colours	Away colours

Százhalombattai Labdarúgó Klub is a football club from the town of Százhalombatta, Hungary.

== History ==
Százhalombatta won the 1998–99 Nemzeti Bajnokság III season.

In the 2001–02 Nemzeti Bajnokság II season, Százhalombatta beat Diósgyőri VTK 3-2 at home.

Százhalombatta won the Duna group of the 2007–08 Nemzeti Bajnokság III season and gained promotion to the second division. However, they were relegated after finishing in the penultimate position of the 2008–09 Nemzeti Bajnokság II season.

In the 2025–26 Megyei Bajnokság II, Százhalombatta finished in the second position and gained promotion to the 2026–27 Megyei Bajnokság I.

== Grounds ==
- Vasút utca

== Name changes ==
- Dunai Kőolaj Sportkör: 1965 – 1992
- Százhalombattai Futball Club: 1992 – 1999
- Százhalombatta Labdarúgó Klub: 1999 – 2011
- Százhalombattai Labdarúgó Klub-investiz: 2011 – ?
- Százhalombattai Labdarúgó Klub: ? – 2023
- Százhalombattai VUK SE: 2023 –

== Honours ==
=== League ===
- Nemzeti Bajnokság III:
  - Winners (3): 1992–93, 1998–99, 2007–08

== Seasons ==
The table below shows the seasons of Százhalombattai VUK SE.

Season	Tier	Club's name	Position	Pts
1967	7	Dunai Kőolaj	0 / 16	0
1968	7	Dunai Kőolaj	0 / 15	
1969	7	Dunai Kőolaj	3 / 15	38
1970	7	Dunai Kőolaj	3 / 9	24
1970–71	7	Dunai Kőolaj	4 / 10	26
1971–72	7	Dunai Kőolaj	2 / 16	43
1972–73	7	Dunai Kőolaj	6 / 16	33
1973–74	7	Dunai Kőolaj	2 / 18	44
1974–75	5	Dunai Kőolaj	5 / 12	23
1975–76	5	Dunai Kőolaj	1 / 12	34
1976–77	4	Dunai Kőolaj	5 / 16	35
1977–78	4	Dunai Kőolaj	10 / 16	29
1978–79	3	Dunai Kőolaj	1 / 18	64
1979–80	3	Dunai Kőolaj SK	2 / 18	53
1980–81	3	Dunai Kőolaj SK	5 / 18	45
1981–82	4	Dunai Kőolaj SK	3 / 16	41
1982–83	4	Dunai Kőolaj SK	2 / 16	45
1983–84	4	Dunai Kőolaj SK	3 / 16	43
1984–85	4	Dunai Kőolaj SK	1 / 16	47
1985–86	3	Dunai Kőolaj SK	15 / 18	28
1986–87	3	Dunai Kőolaj SK	14 / 18	30
1987–88	3	Duna Kőolaj SK	8 / 18	32
1988–89	3	Dunai Kőolaj	5 / 16	49
1989–90	3	Dunai Kőolaj SK	4 / 16	55
1990–91	3	Dunai Kőolaj SK	5 / 16	38
1991–92	3	Százhalombatta FC	4 / 16	35
1992–93	3	Százhalombatta FC	1 / 16	51
1993–94	2	Százhalombattai FC	4 / 16	34
1994–95	2	Százhalombatta FC	10 / 16	38
1995–96	2	Százhalombattai FC	9 / 16	39
1996–97	2	Százhalombattai FC	9 / 16	44
1997–98	3	Százhalombattai FC	9 / 16	41
1998–99	3	Százhalombattai FC	1 / 16	57
1999–00	2	Százhalombattai FC	11 / 20	54
2000	2	Százhalombatta	4 / 7	19
2000–01	2	Százhalombatta	2 / 12	39
2001–02	2	Százhalombatta	9 / 12	45
2001–02	2	Százhalombatta	9 / 12	29
2002–03	2	Százhalombattai FC	6 / 20	53
2003–04	4	Százhalombatta	9 / 16	41
2004–05	4	Százhalombatta	1 / 15	63
2005–06	3	Százhalombattai LK	2 / 18	75
2006–07	3	Százhalombatta	3 / 14	48
2007–08	3	Százhalombattai LK	1 / 16	68
2008–09	2	Százhalombattai LK	15 / 16	22
2009–10	3	Százhalombattai LK	10 / 14	29
2010–11	3	Százhalombattai LK	9 / 16	42
2011–12	3	Százhalombattai LK-investiz	10 / 16	37
2012–13	3	Százhalombattai LK-investiz	12 / 15	32
2013–14	4	Százhalombattai LK-investiz	10 / 16	36
2014–15	4	Százhalombattai LK	12 / 16	35
2015–16	5	Százhalombattai LK	2 / 16	69
2016–17	4	Százhalombattai LK	14 / 16	22
2017–18	4	Százhalombattai LK	10 / 16	32
2018–19	4	Százhalombattai LK	8 / 16	38
2019–20	4	Százhalombattai LK	13 / 16	17
2020–21	4	Százhalombattai LK	15 / 16	10
2021–22	5	Százhalombattai LK	9 / 16	35
2022–23	5	Százhalombattai LK	14 / 16	17
2023–24	5	Százhalombatta VUK SE	7 / 16	46
2024–25	5	Százhalombattai VUK SE	5 / 16	63
2025–26	5	Százhalombattai VUK SE	2 / 16	80
