= Nyírbátori FC =

Hungarian football club

- Full name: Nyírbátori Football Club
- Founded: 1917; 109 years ago
- Dissolved: 2019
- Stadium: Sport utca
- Capacity: 2,500
- League: NB III
- 2017–18: NB III, East, 7th
Home colours

Nyírbátori Football Club was a professional football club based in Nyírbátor, Szabolcs-Szatmár-Bereg County, Hungary.

== History ==
On 19 June 2019, it was announced that Nyírbátori FC was dissolved. After the dissolution, all of the players continued their carriers in different clubs.

== Name changes ==
- 1951–53: Nyírbátori Kinizsi
- 1953–57: Nyírbátori SK
- 1957–?: Nyírbátori Spartacus
- 1976–91: Nyírbátori Báthory SC
- 1991–present: Nyírbátori Football Club

== Honours ==
- Nemzeti Bajnokság III:

== Seasons ==
The table below shows the seasons of Nyírbátori FC.

Season	Tier	Club's name	Position	Pts
1922–23	3	Nyírbátori SE	5 / 5	
1931–32	2	Nyírbátori AFE	7 / 8	6
1932–33	3	Nyírbátori AFE	1 / 7	17
1933–34	2	Nyírbátori AFE	4 / 12	30
1934–35	2	Nyírbátori AFE	6 / 13	29
1935–36	2	Nyírbátori AFE	8 / 14	22
1936–37	2	Báthori SE	7 / 14	27
1937–38	2	Báthory SE	10 / 14	19
1938–39	3	Báthory SE	12 / 13	7
1945	2	Nyírbátori SE	0 / 7	
1945–46	3	Nyírbátori SE	2 / 8	19
1946–47	3	Nyírbátori SE	3 / 11	29
1947–48	3	Nyírbátori SE	8 / 13	23
1948–49	3	Nyírbátori SzIT SE	2 / 16	40
1949–50	3	Nyírbátori SzIT SE	7 / 16	33
1950	3	Nyírbátori ÉDOSz	11 / 17	12
1951	3	Nyírbátori Kinizsi	5 / 14	28
1952	3	Nyírbátori Kinizsi	7 / 14	28
1953	3	Nyírbátori SK	4 / 14	37
1954	3	Nyírbátori SK	2 / 13	32
1955	3	Nyírbátori SK	9 / 16	30
1956	3	Nyírbátori FSK	14 / 16	22
1957	3	Nyírbátori SK	4 / 6	11
1957–58	3	Nyírbátori Spartacus	8 / 16	29
1958–59	3	Nyírbátori Spartacus	16 / 16	18
1959–60	4	Nyírbátori Spartacus	4 / 16	38
1960–61	4	Nyírbátori Spartacus	2 / 18	48
1961–62	4	Nyírbátori Spartacus	2 / 16	37
1962–63	4	Nyírbátori Spartacus	3 / 16	37
1963	5	Nyírbátori Spartacus	4 / 18	19
1964	5	Nyírbátori Spartacus	7 / 18	35
1965	5	Nyírbátori Spartacus	4 / 17	31
1966	5	Nyírbátori Spartacus	5 / 18	38
1967	5	Nyírbátori Spartacus	3 / 16	37
1968	5	Nyírbátori Spartacus	9 / 16	29
1969	5	Nyírbátori MEDOSZ	14 / 16	24
1970	5	Nyírbátori MEDOSZ	5 / 8	14
1970–71	5	Nyírbátori MEDOSZ	8 / 16	30
1971–72	5	Nyírbátori MEDOSZ	7 / 16	32
1972–73	5	Nyírbátori MEDOSZ	4 / 16	33
1973–74	5	Nyírbátori MEDOSZ	8 / 16	29
1974–75	4	Nyírbátori MEDOSZ	14 / 16	20
1975–76	5	Nyírbátori Báthory SC	3 / 16	45
1976–77	5	Nyírbátori Báthory SC	1 / 16	42
1977–78	4	Nyírbátori Báthory SC	1 / 16	41
1978–79	3	Nyírbátori Báthory SC	8 / 16	29
1979–80	3	Nyírbátori Báthory SC	6 / 16	31
1980–81	3	Nyírbátori Báthory SC	10 / 16	29
1981–82	4	Nyírbátori Báthory SC	5 / 18	41
1982–83	4	Nyírbátori BSC	10 / 18	34
1983–84	4	Nyírbátori BSC	8 / 18	35
1984–85	4	Nyírbátori Báthory SC	14 / 18	29
1985–86	4	Nyírbátori Báthory SC	10 / 16	30
1986–87	4	Nyírbátori BSC	15 / 16	21
1987–88	5	Nyírbátori BSC	1 / 16	49
1988–89	4	Nyírbátori BSC	7 / 16	33
1989–90	4	Nyírbátori BSC	6 / 16	32
1990–91	4	Nyírbátori BSC	10 / 16	26
1991–92	4	Nyírbátori BSC	10 / 16	28
1992–93	4	Nyírbátori FC	1 / 16	50
1993–94	3	Nyírbátor FC	4 / 16	35
1994–95	3	Nyírbátor FC	8 / 16	43
1995–96	3	Nyírbátor FC	11 / 16	38
1996–97	3	Nyírbátori FC	3 / 16	51
1997–98	3	Nyírbátor	9 / 16	42
1998–99	3	Nyírbátori FC	3 / 16	41
1999–00	3	Nyírbátor	8 / 16	41
2000	3	Nyírbátor	3 / 8	21
2000–01	4	Nyírbátor	1 / 11	43
2001–02	3	Nyírbátori FC	10 / 13	27
2002–03	3	Nyírbátor FC	10 / 12	24
2002–03	3	Nyírbátor FC	10 / 12	39
2003–04	5	Nyírbátor	12 / 16	39
2004–05	5	Nyírbátor	8 / 16	44
2005–06	4	Nyírbátor	6 / 16	43
2006–07	4	Nyírbátori FC	9 / 16	35
2007–08	4	Nyírbátori FC	7 / 16	40
2008–09	4	Nyírbátor FC	3 / 16	59
2009–10	4	Nyírbátor FC	3 / 18	68
2010–11	4	Nyírbátori FC	2 / 18	72
2011–12	3	Nyírbátori FC	2 / 16	65
2012–13	3	Nyírbátor FC	2 / 14	54
2013–14	3	Nyírbátori FC	8 / 16	44
2014–15	3	Nyírbátori FC	8 / 16	39
2015–16	3	Nyírbátori FC	14 / 17	25
2016–17	3	Nyírbátori FC	11 / 18	46
2017–18	3	Nyírbátori FC	7 / 16	37
2018–19	3	Nyírbátori FC	8 / 16	46
