= Hévíz SK =

Hungarian football club

- Full name: Hévíz Sport Klub
- Founded: 1949
- Ground: Kossuth Lajos utcai pálya
- Capacity: 1,200
- Manager: Miklós Lendvai
- League: Nemzeti Bajnokság III
Home colours

Hévíz Sport Klub is a professional football club based in Hévíz, Zala County, Hungary, that competes in the Nemzeti Bajnokság III, the third tier of Hungarian football.

== Name changes ==
- 1949–51: Hévízi Egyetértés SE
- 1951–55: Hévízi Lendület SK
- 1955: Hévízi Petőfi Sport Egyesület
- 1955–57: Hévízi Bástya
- 1959–70: Hévízi KISZ Falusi SK
- 1970–72: defunct
- 1998-99: Hévízi SK
- 1999: merger with Zalaapáti
- 1999–00: Royal Goldavis Hévíz FC
- 2000–present: Hévíz Futball Club

== Honours ==
=== League ===
- Nemzeti Bajnokság III:
  - Winners (2): 1999–2000, 2008–09
