= 2025–26 Megyei Bajnokság I =

Megyei Bajnokság I
- Season: 2025–26
- Promoted: 11 teams

The 2025–26 Megyei Bajnokság I includes the championships of 20 counties in Hungary. It is the fourth tier of the Hungarian football league system.

== Teams ==
The following teams have changed division since the 2024–25 season.

County	To Megyei Bajnokság I		From Megyei Bajnokság I				Ref.
County	Relegated from Nemzeti Bajnokság III	Promoted from Megyei Bajnokság II	Promoted to Nemzeti Bajnokság III	Relegated to		Dissolved	Ref.
County	Relegated from Nemzeti Bajnokság III	Promoted from Megyei Bajnokság II	Promoted to Nemzeti Bajnokság III	Megyei Bajnokság II	Megyei Bajnokság III	Dissolved	Ref.
Bács-Kiskun	Kecskeméti TE II	Csólyospálos	—N/a	Akasztó	Solt	—N/a	
Baranya	—N/a	Sellye	—N/a				
Békés	—N/a		Békéscsaba II	—N/a			
Borsod-Abaúj-Zemplén	—N/a	Izsófalva; Mezőcsát; Sátoraljaújhely	Ózd-Sajóvölgye	Mályi	—N/a	Hidasnémeti	
Budapest	Kelen	Ikarus; Nagytétény	—N/a	Budai; II. Kerület	Gázgyár	—N/a	
Csongrád-Csanád	—N/a	Csongrád; SZEOL SC-FK Szeged	Szeged II	Balástya	—N/a		
Fejér	Főnix; Gárdony	Videoton Baráti Kör	Dunaújváros	Bodajk	—N/a		
Győr-Moson-Sopron	Gyirmót II	—N/a		Győrszentiván	Nádorváros	Hegykő	
Hajdú-Bihar	—N/a	Püskökladány	—N/a	Egyek	—N/a		
Heves	—N/a			Heréd; Vámosgyörk	—N/a		
Jász-Nagykun-Szolnok	Szolnok	Abádszalók; Zagyvarékas	—N/a	Jászapáti; Tiszagyenda; Kunszentmárton	—N/a		
Komárom-Esztergom	—N/a	Környe	Zsámbék	Almásfüzitő	—N/a		
Nógrád	Salgótarján	Somos	—N/a	Bánk-Dalnoki Akadémia	—N/a	Szendehely	
Pest	—N/a	Aranyszarvas	Gödöllő	Nagykáta; Örkény	—N/a		
Somogy	—N/a		Balatonlelle	Balatonkeresztúr	—N/a		
Szabolcs-Szatmár-Bereg	Mátészalka	Gyulaháza; Tiszavasvári	Tarpa	Nyírvasvári	—N/a	Kemecse	
Tolna	Bonyhád VLC; Dunaföldvár	Dombóvári LK; Nagymányok-Majos	Dombóvári FC	Bonyhád-Börzsöny	—N/a	Holler; Tevel	
Vas	—N/a	Lukácsháza	—N/a		Rábapaty; Vasvár	—N/a	
Veszprém	—N/a	Ugod; Tapolca	Pápa	—N/a	Ajka Kristály	Fűzfő; RAC Gyulafirátót	
Zala	—N/a	Becsehely	—N/a			Gyenesdiás	

== Tables ==
=== Bács-Kiskun ===
Pos	Team	Pld	W	D	L	GF	GA	GD	Pts	Promotion or relegation
1	Tiszakécske II (C)	30	21	4	5	83	44	+39	67	
2	Kecskeméti TE II	30	20	6	4	79	26	+53	66	Qualification for promotion play-offs
3	Harta	30	19	1	10	89	55	+34	58	
4	Hírös-Ép	30	18	2	10	61	44	+17	56	
5	Kunbaja	30	16	8	6	56	31	+25	56	
6	Baja	30	15	7	8	75	43	+32	52	
7	Jánoshalma	30	15	5	10	57	36	+21	50	
8	Lajosmizse	30	15	3	12	70	50	+20	48	
9	Soltvadkert	30	13	8	9	56	44	+12	47	
10	Kalocsa	30	12	7	11	65	53	+12	43	
11	Kecel	30	9	5	16	58	74	−16	32	
12	Kiskunfélegyháza	30	9	5	16	47	69	−22	32	
13	Kiskőrös	30	7	8	15	31	64	−33	29	
14	Kecskeméti LC	30	8	3	19	44	61	−17	27	
15	Csólyospálos	30	2	4	24	26	121	−95	10	Relegation to Megyei Bajnokság II
16	Bácsalmás	30	2	2	26	21	103	−82	8	Relegation to Megyei Bajnokság II

Source: Hungarian Football Federation
(C) Champions

=== Baranya ===
Pos	Team	Pld	W	D	L	GF	GA	GD	Pts	Promotion or relegation
1	Mohács (C)	27	24	2	1	99	12	+87	74	Qualification for promotion play-offs
2	Nagykozár	27	17	5	5	58	37	+21	56	
3	Komlói Bányász	27	16	7	4	67	38	+29	55	
4	Villány	27	16	5	6	67	34	+33	53	
5	Pécsi EAC II	27	13	2	12	59	49	+10	41	
6	Sellye	27	10	5	12	33	49	−16	35	
7	Pécsi VSK	27	7	6	14	28	52	−24	27	
8	Harkány	27	6	3	18	34	72	−38	21	
9	Siklós	27	3	3	21	27	80	−53	12	
10	Bóly	27	1	6	20	21	70	−49	9	Relegation to Megyei Bajnokság II

Source: Hungarian Football Federation
(C) Champions

=== Békés ===
==== Regular stage ====
Pos	Team	Pld	W	D	L	GF	GA	GD	Pts	Qualification
1	Szarvas	18	16	2	0	95	11	+84	50	Qualification for promotion group
2	OMTK-ULE	18	14	2	2	56	30	+26	44	Qualification for promotion group
3	Kondoros	18	13	2	3	55	26	+29	41	Qualification for promotion group
4	Gyomaendrőd	18	9	5	4	33	22	+11	32	Qualification for promotion group
5	Jamina	18	9	4	5	36	29	+7	31	Qualification for promotion group
6	Szeghalom	18	6	1	11	34	52	−18	19	Qualification for relegation group
7	Nagyszénás	18	4	1	13	25	53	−28	13	Qualification for relegation group
8	Dévaványa	18	4	1	13	28	58	−30	13	Qualification for relegation group
9	Békés	18	2	3	13	19	52	−33	9	Qualification for relegation group
10	Füzesgyarmat	18	2	1	15	20	68	−48	7	Qualification for relegation group
11	Mezőhegyes (Note: Mezőhegyes withdrew due to shortage of personnel, their results was cancelled.)	0	0	0	0	0	0	0	0	Withdrawn

Source: Hungarian Football Federation

==== Promotion group ====
Pos	Team	Pld	W	D	L	GF	GA	GD	Pts	Promotion
1	Szarvas (C)	26	22	3	1	122	22	+100	69	Qualification for promotion play-offs
2	OMTK-ULE	26	18	2	6	79	53	+26	56	
3	Kondoros	26	15	5	6	68	38	+30	50	
4	Gyomaendrőd	26	12	7	7	44	39	+5	43	
5	Jamina	26	10	6	10	47	51	−4	36	

Source: Hungarian Football Federation
(C) Champions

==== Relegation group ====
Pos	Team	Pld	W	D	L	GF	GA	GD	Pts	
1	Szeghalom	26	10	2	14	54	65	−11	32	
2	Nagyszénás	26	10	1	15	53	66	−13	31	
3	Dévaványa	26	7	3	16	48	81	−33	24	
4	Békés	26	5	5	16	35	72	−37	20	
5	Füzesgyarmat	26	3	2	21	32	95	−63	11	Relegation to Megyei Bajnokság II

Source: Hungarian Football Federation

=== Borsod-Abaúj-Zemplén ===
Pos	Team	Pld	W	D	L	GF	GA	GD	Pts	Promotion or relegation
1	Emőd (C)	28	20	5	3	63	22	+41	65	Qualification for promotion play-offs
2	Gesztely	28	20	3	5	82	35	+47	63	
3	Sajóbábony	28	18	4	6	65	36	+29	58	
4	Alsózsolca	28	17	2	9	61	44	+17	53	
5	Bánhorváti-Sajóvölgye	28	15	5	8	81	36	+45	50	
6	Edelény-Borsodszer	28	15	3	10	67	47	+20	48	
7	Parasznya	28	14	4	10	54	47	+7	46	
8	Mezőkeresztes	28	13	4	11	62	42	+20	43	
9	Mezőcsát	28	13	4	11	55	59	−4	43	
10	Tállya	28	11	5	12	60	54	+6	38	
11	Felsőzsolca	28	10	7	11	53	57	−4	37	
12	Miskolc	28	9	3	16	42	53	−11	30	
13	Szirmabesenyő	28	4	2	22	30	82	−52	14	
14	Szerencs	28	3	2	23	27	80	−53	11	
15	Sátoraljaújhely	28	1	1	26	21	129	−108	4	Relegation to Megyei Bajnokság II
16	Izsófalva	0	0	0	0	0	0	0	0	Withdrawn

Source: Hungarian Football Federation
(C) Champions

=== Budapest ===
Pos	Team	Pld	W	D	L	GF	GA	GD	Pts	Promotion or relegation
1	SZAC (C, P)	30	21	5	4	74	32	+42	68	Qualification for promotion play-offs
2	Unione	30	20	5	5	73	37	+36	65	
3	Budafok II	30	19	6	5	69	34	+35	63	
4	Flotta 2001	30	17	5	8	51	32	+19	56	
5	Csepel UFC	30	16	6	8	57	42	+15	54	
6	Ikarus	30	15	4	11	59	48	+11	49	
7	Testnevelési Főiskola	30	12	10	8	42	33	+9	46	
8	Kelen	30	12	4	14	53	44	+9	40	
9	Rákospalota	30	11	6	13	51	52	−1	39	
10	Testvériség	30	11	4	15	49	69	−20	37	
11	Szabadkikötő	30	10	7	13	72	65	+7	37	
12	Fővárosi Vízművek	30	10	4	16	51	66	−15	34	
13	43. Sz. Építők	30	9	5	16	33	44	−11	32	
14	Issimo	30	7	8	15	39	65	−26	29	
15	Nagytétény	30	4	4	22	30	79	−49	16	Relegation to Megyei Bajnokság II
16	Ludovika	30	2	5	23	24	85	−61	11	Relegation to Megyei Bajnokság II

Source: Hungarian Football Federation
(C) Champions; (P) Promoted

=== Csongrád-Csanád ===
==== Regular stage ====
Pos	Team	Pld	W	D	L	GF	GA	GD	Pts	Qualification
1	Sándorfalva	22	21	1	0	83	11	+72	64	Qualification for promotion group
2	Algyő	22	16	2	4	52	26	+26	50	Qualification for promotion group
3	Dorozsma	22	15	3	4	55	22	+33	48	Qualification for promotion group
4	Makó	22	15	3	4	54	30	+24	48	Qualification for promotion group
5	Tiszasziget	22	12	4	6	55	31	+24	40	Qualification for promotion group
6	Bordány	22	10	4	8	40	28	+12	34	Qualification for promotion group
7	Szentes	22	7	2	13	38	56	−18	23	Qualification for relegation group
8	Csongrád	22	6	1	15	34	54	−20	19	Qualification for relegation group
9	Deszk	22	5	3	14	36	59	−23	18	Qualification for relegation group
10	Hódmezővásárhelyi TUS	22	5	0	17	44	95	−51	15	Qualification for relegation group
11	Mórahalom	22	3	5	14	29	53	−24	14	Qualification for relegation group
12	SZEOL SC-FK Szeged	22	2	2	18	32	87	−55	8	Qualification for relegation group

Source: Hungarian Football Federation

==== Promotion group ====
Pos	Team	Pld	W	D	L	GF	GA	GD	Pts	Promotion
1	Sándorfalva (C, P)	32	30	2	0	121	20	+101	92	Qualification for promotion play-offs
2	Algyő	32	21	4	7	73	40	+33	67	
3	Dorozsma	32	20	3	9	70	39	+31	63	
4	Makó	32	19	4	9	68	48	+20	61	
5	Tiszasziget	32	14	5	13	66	51	+15	47	
6	Bordány	32	12	5	15	50	59	−9	41	

Source: Hungarian Football Federation
(C) Champions; (P) Promoted

==== Relegation group ====
Pos	Team	Pld	W	D	L	GF	GA	GD	Pts	
1	Szentes	32	13	3	16	68	76	−8	42	
2	Csongrád	32	12	3	17	59	74	−15	39	
3	Mórahalom	32	10	6	16	69	66	+3	36	
4	Deszk	32	9	3	20	47	73	−26	30	
5	Hódmezővásárhelyi TUS	32	8	0	24	59	138	−79	23 (Note: Hódmezővásárhelyi TUS were deducted 1 point)	
6	SZEOL SC-FK Szeged	32	4	2	26	54	120	−66	14	Relegation to Megyei Bajnokság II

Source: Hungarian Football Federation

=== Fejér ===
Pos	Team	Pld	W	D	L	GF	GA	GD	Pts	Promotion or relegation
1	Sárbogárd (C, P)	28	24	2	2	122	22	+100	74	Qualification for promotion play-offs
2	Csór	28	20	3	5	85	34	+51	63	
3	Mór	28	19	4	5	71	23	+48	61	
4	Főnix	28	19	0	9	90	42	+48	57	
5	Gárdony	28	16	3	9	95	42	+53	51	
6	Martonvásár	28	13	9	6	60	29	+31	48	
7	Ikarus-Maroshegy	28	13	4	11	63	51	+12	43	
8	Lajoskomárom	28	13	3	12	51	43	+8	42	
9	Ercsi Kinizsi	28	13	2	13	64	54	+10	41	
10	Kápolnásnyék	28	9	8	11	47	68	−21	35	
11	Sárosd	28	10	4	14	67	66	+1	34	
12	Adony	28	7	4	17	50	88	−38	25	
13	Videoton Baráti Kör	28	4	5	19	34	98	−64	17	
14	Mezőfalva	28	2	1	25	24	147	−123	7	
15	Enying	28	1	2	25	33	149	−116	5	Relegation to Megyei Bajnokság II

Source: Hungarian Football Federation
(C) Champions; (P) Promoted

=== Győr-Moson-Sopron ===
Pos	Team	Pld	W	D	L	GF	GA	GD	Pts	Promotion or relegation
1	Mezőörs (C)	26	25	0	1	146	17	+129	75	
2	Gyirmót II	26	25	0	1	119	18	+101	75	
3	Kapuvár	26	19	1	6	81	26	+55	58	
4	Győrújbarát	26	17	3	6	93	32	+61	54	
5	Bácsa	26	15	4	7	58	36	+22	49	
6	Koroncó	26	13	4	9	62	47	+15	43	
7	Abda	26	13	3	10	69	53	+16	42	
8	Mosonmagyaróvár II	26	9	3	14	50	68	−18	30	
9	Vitnyéd	26	8	3	15	49	84	−35	27	
10	Ménfőcsanak	26	7	3	16	34	73	−39	24	
11	Csorna	26	5	5	16	34	73	−39	20	
12	Győrújfalu	26	3	4	19	33	108	−75	13	
13	Gönyű	26	3	2	21	28	100	−72	11	
14	Fertőszentmiklós	26	2	1	23	18	139	−121	7	Relegation to Megyei Bajnokság II

Source: Hungarian Football Federation
(C) Champions

=== Hajdú-Bihar ===
Pos	Team	Pld	W	D	L	GF	GA	GD	Pts	Promotion or relegation
1	Hajdúnánás (C, P)	30	27	2	1	142	25	+117	83	Qualification for promotion play-offs
2	Hajdúszoboszló	30	24	3	3	122	28	+94	75	
3	Balmazújváros	30	20	3	7	85	44	+41	63	
4	Hajdúsámson	30	19	5	6	88	39	+49	62	
5	Monostorpályi	30	19	3	8	85	41	+44	60	
6	Sárréti	30	13	8	9	60	52	+8	47	
7	Debreceni EAC II	30	12	5	13	74	62	+12	41	
8	Berettyóújfalu	30	13	1	16	71	63	+8	40	
9	Nyíradony	30	10	7	13	42	67	−25	34 (Note: Nyíradony were deducted 3 points)	
10	Bestrong	30	9	5	16	51	65	−14	32	
11	Püspökladány	30	9	4	17	57	84	−27	31	
12	Kaba	30	7	9	14	53	62	−9	30	
13	Bocskai	30	7	4	19	43	94	−51	25	
14	Hajdúböszörmény	30	6	7	17	37	58	−21	25	
15	Téglás	30	6	10	14	33	54	−21	25 (Note: Téglás were deducted 3 points)	Relegation to Megyei Bajnokság II
16	Létavértes	30	1	0	29	29	234	−205	3	Relegation to Megyei Bajnokság II

Source: Hungarian Football Federation
(C) Champions; (P) Promoted

=== Heves ===
Pos	Team	Pld	W	D	L	GF	GA	GD	Pts	Promotion or relegation
1	Lőrinci (C)	24	19	3	2	50	16	+34	60	
2	Gyöngyös	24	16	3	5	59	24	+35	51	Qualification for promotion play-offs
3	Egerszalók	24	13	5	6	50	35	+15	44	
4	Heves	24	11	4	9	64	38	+26	37	
5	Andornaktálya	24	8	8	8	34	34	0	30 (Note: Andornaktálya were deducted 2 points)	
6	Maklár	24	8	3	13	38	50	−12	27	
7	Gyöngyöshalász	24	5	6	13	34	52	−18	21	
8	Energia	24	4	6	14	22	45	−23	18	
9	Besenyőtelek	24	4	2	18	30	87	−57	14	

Source: Hungarian Football Federation
(C) Champions

=== Jász-Nagykun-Szolnok ===
Pos	Team	Pld	W	D	L	GF	GA	GD	Pts	Promotion or relegation
1	Szolnok (C, P)	30	27	2	1	148	23	+125	83	Qualification for promotion play-offs
2	Jászberény	30	23	3	4	84	29	+55	72	
3	Kenderes	30	22	3	5	96	43	+53	69	
4	Törökszentmiklós	30	18	5	7	67	33	+34	59	
5	Zagyvarékas	30	16	7	7	58	41	+17	55	
6	Szajol	30	17	3	10	77	54	+23	54	
7	Jászfényszaru	30	15	6	9	72	45	+27	51	
8	Rákóczifalva	30	14	4	12	71	57	+14	46	
9	Mezőtúri AFC-RAFI	30	12	5	13	66	60	+6	41	
10	Cserkeszőlő	30	10	3	17	46	83	−37	33	
11	Kisújszállás	30	6	6	18	42	86	−44	24	
12	Lurkó Focimánia	30	6	3	21	39	77	−38	21	
13	Tószeg	30	5	5	20	52	125	−73	20	
14	Abádszalók	30	4	4	22	43	97	−54	16	
15	Tiszaszentimre	30	4	3	23	32	116	−84	15	Relegation to Megyei Bajnokság II
16	Jánoshida	30	7	6	17	42	66	−24	0 (Note: Jánoshida were deducted 27 points)	Relegation to Megyei Bajnokság II

Source: Hungarian Football Federation
(C) Champions; (P) Promoted

=== Komárom-Esztergom ===
==== Regular stage ====
Pos	Team	Pld	W	D	L	GF	GA	GD	Pts	Qualification
1	Sárisáp	22	22	0	0	117	11	+106	66	Qualification for promotion group
2	Koppánymonostor	22	19	1	2	115	13	+102	58	Qualification for promotion group
3	Tata	22	12	4	6	71	21	+50	40	Qualification for promotion group
4	Kecskéd	22	11	6	5	53	32	+21	39	Qualification for promotion group
5	Bábolna	22	12	2	8	45	33	+12	38	Qualification for promotion group
6	Vértessomló	22	11	2	9	57	57	0	35	Qualification for promotion group
7	Nyergesújfalu	22	9	3	10	48	43	+5	30	Qualification for relegation group
8	Tát	22	8	4	10	36	48	−12	28	Qualification for relegation group
9	Lábatlan	22	5	3	14	34	83	−49	18	Qualification for relegation group
10	Környe	22	4	5	13	29	42	−13	17	Qualification for relegation group
11	Esztergom	22	3	1	18	13	117	−104	10	Qualification for relegation group
12	Vértesszőlős	22	0	1	21	10	128	−118	1	Qualification for relegation group

Source: Hungarian Football Federation

==== Promotion group ====
Pos	Team	Pld	W	D	L	GF	GA	GD	Pts	Promotion
1	Sárisáp (C, P)	27	27	0	0	134	12	+122	81	Qualification for promotion play-offs
2	Koppánymonostor	27	22	1	4	124	19	+105	67	
3	Tata	27	16	4	7	91	26	+65	52	
4	Kecskéd	27	11	8	8	60	44	+16	41	
5	Bábolna	27	12	4	11	51	53	−2	40	
6	Vértessomló	27	11	4	12	65	80	−15	37	

Source: Hungarian Football Federation
(C) Champions; (P) Promoted

==== Relegation group ====
Pos	Team	Pld	W	D	L	GF	GA	GD	Pts	
1	Nyergesújfalu	27	12	5	10	60	49	+11	41	
2	Tát	27	11	6	10	52	52	0	39	
3	Környe	27	5	9	13	47	50	−3	24	
4	Lábatlan	27	6	4	17	42	92	−50	22	
5	Esztergom	27	3	1	23	19	149	−130	10	
6	Vértesszőlős	27	2	2	23	25	144	−119	4 (Note: Vértesszőlős were deducted 4 points)	Relegation to Megyei Bajnokság II

Source: Hungarian Football Federation

=== Nógrád ===
Pos	Team	Pld	W	D	L	GF	GA	GD	Pts	Promotion or relegation
1	Salgótarján (C, P)	24	22	1	1	97	15	+82	67	Qualification for promotion play-offs
2	Pásztó	24	18	2	4	90	25	+65	56	
3	Karancslapujtő	24	17	3	4	65	25	+40	53 (Note: Karancslapujtő were deducted 1 point)	
4	Vizslás	24	16	4	4	56	20	+36	52	
5	Bátonyterenye	24	16	3	5	64	25	+39	51	
6	Mohora	24	15	3	6	56	39	+17	48	
7	Héhalom	24	8	5	11	36	50	−14	29	
8	Berkenye	24	8	1	15	46	66	−20	25	
9	Somos	24	8	0	16	43	59	−16	24	
10	Szügy-Talent	24	6	0	18	24	56	−32	18	
11	Diósjenő	24	5	1	18	21	91	−70	16	
12	Karancsberény-Újbuda	24	3	0	21	17	84	−67	9	
13	Szécsény	24	2	1	21	23	83	−60	7	
14	Balassagyarmat	0	0	0	0	0	0	0	0	Withdrawn

Source: Hungarian Football Federation
(C) Champions; (P) Promoted

=== Pest ===
Pos	Team	Pld	W	D	L	GF	GA	GD	Pts	Promotion or relegation
1	Vecsés (C)	30	26	3	1	96	19	+77	81	
2	Szentendre	30	21	4	5	95	43	+52	67	
3	Dunavarsány	30	21	4	5	73	33	+40	67	Qualification for promotion play-offs
4	Pilis	30	16	5	9	51	37	+14	53	
5	Cegléd	30	15	5	10	54	45	+9	50	
6	Bugyi	30	15	3	12	45	39	+6	48	
7	Dunakeszi	30	14	4	12	81	58	+23	46	
8	Felsőpakony	30	14	3	13	62	55	+7	45	
9	Cso-Ki Sport	30	13	3	14	62	64	−2	42	
10	Vác	30	11	4	15	40	46	−6	37	
11	Aranyszarvas	30	11	3	16	46	61	−15	36	
12	Biatorbágy	30	9	8	13	35	45	−10	35	
13	Perbál	30	6	7	17	44	73	−29	25	
14	Pomáz	30	6	4	20	26	87	−61	22	
15	Budakalász	30	3	8	19	27	72	−45	17	Relegation to Megyei Bajnokság II
16	Diósd	30	2	6	22	20	80	−60	12	Relegation to Megyei Bajnokság II

Source: Hungarian Football Federation
(C) Champions

=== Somogy ===
Pos	Team	Pld	W	D	L	GF	GA	GD	Pts	
1	Nagyatád (C)	24	20	2	2	94	23	+71	62	Qualification for promotion play-offs
2	Kaposfüred	24	20	1	3	87	16	+71	61	
3	Marcali	24	17	3	4	77	28	+49	54	
4	Nagybajom	24	12	5	7	53	32	+21	41	
5	Juta	24	12	3	9	52	41	+11	39	
6	Toponár	24	11	4	9	54	48	+6	37	
7	Balatoni Vasas	24	11	3	10	36	34	+2	36	
8	Somogysárd	24	11	3	10	42	41	+1	36	
9	Kaposmérő	24	10	4	10	42	44	−2	34	
10	Kadarkút	24	6	5	13	32	59	−27	23	
11	Tab	24	3	2	19	24	90	−66	11	
12	Csurgó	24	3	0	21	21	93	−72	9	
13	Barcs	24	2	1	21	25	90	−65	7	Relegation to Megyei Bajnokság II

Source: Hungarian Football Federation
(C) Champions

=== Szabolcs-Szatmár-Bereg ===
Pos	Team	Pld	W	D	L	GF	GA	GD	Pts	Promotion or relegation
1	Mátészalka (C, P)	28	24	4	0	96	13	+83	76	Qualification for promotion play-offs
2	Nyírbátor	28	23	4	1	101	20	+81	73	
3	Mándok	28	20	2	6	81	28	+53	62	
4	Nagyecsed	28	18	4	6	55	18	+37	58	
5	Újfehértó	28	17	2	9	68	39	+29	53	
6	Csenger	28	13	3	12	63	64	−1	42	
7	Ibrány	28	13	2	13	57	52	+5	41	
8	Vásárosnamény	28	10	2	16	49	67	−18	32	
9	Nagykálló	28	8	7	13	35	53	−18	31	
10	Baktalórántháza	28	9	2	17	43	87	−44	29	
11	Kótaj	28	8	5	15	34	57	−23	29	
12	Gergelyiugornya	28	6	5	17	31	60	−29	23	
13	Nyírmeggyes	28	6	2	20	35	81	−46	20	
14	Gyulaháza	28	6	1	21	24	79	−55	19	
15	Tiszavasvári	28	4	5	19	39	93	−54	17	Relegation to Megyei Bajnokság II

Source: Hungarian Football Federation
(C) Champions; (P) Promoted

=== Tolna ===
Pos	Team	Pld	W	D	L	GF	GA	GD	Pts	Promotion or relegation
1	Bölcske (C)	24	16	4	4	68	30	+38	52	
2	Bátaszék	24	14	3	7	63	41	+22	45	
3	Bonyhád VLC	24	13	3	8	50	48	+2	42	
4	Dombóvári LK	24	11	6	7	53	39	+14	39	
5	Nagymányok-Majos	22	8	0	14	43	63	−20	24	
6	Kakasd	24	7	4	13	45	55	−10	25	
7	Dunaföldvár	24	4	0	20	37	83	−46	12	Relegation to Megyei Bajnokság II

Source: Hungarian Football Federation
(C) Champions

=== Vas ===
==== Regular stage ====
Pos	Team	Pld	W	D	L	GF	GA	GD	Pts	Qualification
1	Király	22	19	1	2	70	13	+57	58	Qualification for 1st–4th place playoffs
2	Sárvár	22	15	6	1	69	18	+51	51	Qualification for 1st–4th place playoffs
3	Szarvaskend	22	14	2	6	48	40	+8	44	Qualification for 1st–4th place playoffs
4	ISA Haladás	22	13	2	7	35	22	+13	41	Qualification for 1st–4th place playoffs
5	Söpte	22	12	1	9	37	29	+8	37	Qualification for 5th–8th place playoffs
6	Vép	22	11	3	8	60	33	+27	36	Qualification for 5th–8th place playoffs
7	Szentgotthárd	22	11	3	8	34	24	+10	36	Qualification for 5th–8th place playoffs
8	Celldömölk	22	8	3	11	31	43	−12	27	Qualification for 5th–8th place playoffs
9	Lukácsháza	22	4	4	14	30	78	−48	16	Qualification for 9th–12th place playoffs
10	Csepreg	22	3	4	15	24	46	−22	13	Qualification for 9th–12th place playoffs
11	Csákánydoroszló	22	2	3	17	20	87	−67	9	Qualification for 9th–12th place playoffs
12	Körmend	22	1	6	15	17	42	−25	9	Qualification for 9th–12th place playoffs

Source: Hungarian Football Federation

==== 1st–4th place playoffs ====
Pos	Team	Pld	W	D	L	GF	GA	GD	Pts	Promotion
1	Király (C, P)	28	23	1	4	84	21	+63	70	Qualification for promotion play-offs
2	Sárvár	28	21	6	1	93	25	+68	69	
3	Szarvaskend	28	16	2	10	60	61	−1	49 (Note: Szarvaskend were deducted 1 point)	
4	ISA Haladás	28	13	2	13	42	43	−1	41	

Source: Hungarian Football Federation
(C) Champions; (P) Promoted

==== 5th–8th place playoffs ====
Pos	Team	Pld	W	D	L	GF	GA	GD	Pts
1	Vép	28	14	5	9	70	40	+30	47
2	Söpte	28	14	2	12	43	37	+6	44
3	Szentgotthárd	28	13	5	10	45	32	+13	44
4	Celldömölk	28	10	4	14	40	56	−16	34

Source: Hungarian Football Federation

==== 9th–12th place playoffs ====
Pos	Team	Pld	W	D	L	GF	GA	GD	Pts	Relegation
1	Csepreg	28	7	5	16	36	54	−18	26	
2	Lukácsháza	28	6	6	16	42	87	−45	24	
3	Körmend	28	5	7	16	40	50	−10	22	
4	Csákánydoroszló	28	2	3	23	27	116	−89	8 (Note: Csákánydoroszló were deducted 1 point)	Relegation to Megyei Bajnokság II

Source: Hungarian Football Federation

=== Veszprém ===
Pos	Team	Pld	W	D	L	GF	GA	GD	Pts	Promotion or relegation
1	Balatonalmádi (C, P)	24	21	3	0	110	12	+98	66	Qualification for promotion play-offs
2	Sümeg	24	17	3	4	53	31	+22	54	
3	Balatonfüredi USC	24	16	0	8	73	31	+42	48	
4	Úrkút	24	14	5	5	88	27	+61	47	
5	Tihany	24	13	6	5	80	40	+40	45	
6	Várpalota	24	12	4	8	66	36	+30	40	
7	Zirc	24	9	5	10	53	41	+12	32	
8	Ugod	24	8	7	9	39	50	−11	31	
9	Csetény	24	7	4	13	48	53	−5	25	
10	Devecser	24	6	3	15	37	62	−25	21	
11	Szentantalfa	24	6	1	17	34	61	−27	19	
12	Pét	24	4	2	18	20	157	−137	13 (Note: Pét were deducted 1 point)	
13	Tapolca	24	1	1	22	29	129	−100	4	Relegation to Megyei Bajnokság II

Source: Hungarian Football Federation
(C) Champions; (P) Promoted

=== Zala ===
Pos	Team	Pld	W	D	L	GF	GA	GD	Pts	Promotion or relegation
1	Zalaegerszeg II (C, P)	26	23	3	0	107	6	+101	72	Qualification for promotion play-offs
2	Zalaszentgrót	26	17	4	5	56	29	+27	55	
3	Hévíz	26	17	3	6	86	44	+42	54	
4	Andráshida TE	26	16	4	6	55	35	+20	52	
5	Szepetnek	26	13	6	7	50	35	+15	45	
6	Zalakomár-Zalakaros	26	13	1	12	48	59	−11	40	
7	Semjénháza	26	13	4	9	40	35	+5	39 (Note: Semjénháza were deducted 4 points)	
8	Csesztreg	26	12	5	9	54	55	−1	37 (Note: Csesztreg were deducted 4 points)	
9	Andráshida SC	26	11	2	13	58	51	+7	35	
10	Becsehely	26	8	3	15	44	84	−40	27	
11	Teskánd	26	7	5	14	40	50	−10	26	
12	Zalalövő	26	5	3	18	36	57	−21	10 (Note: Zalalövő were deducted 8 points)	
13	Kiskanizsai Sáskák	26	2	2	22	29	105	−76	8	
14	Lenti	26	2	1	23	20	78	−58	7	Relegation to Megyei Bajnokság II

Source: Hungarian Football Federation
(C) Champions; (P) Promoted

== Promotion play-offs ==
The draw was held on 2 June 2026, 11:00 CEST. The first legs were played on 7 June, and the second legs were played on 14 June. SZAC and Gyöngyös gained direct promotion to the Nemzeti Bajnokság III, although the latter subsequently declined participation after determining that the club did not yet have sufficiently stable sporting and financial foundations to compete in the third tier.

=== Matches ===
Team 1	Agg.	Team 2	1st leg	2nd leg
Nagyatád	1–11	Mátészalka	0–4	1–7
Hajdúnánás	5–2	Balatonalmádi	2–2	3–0
Mohács	2–5	Király	0–2	2–3
Sárisáp	2–7	Zalaegerszeg II	1–3	1–4
Sárbogárd	4–2	Dunavarsány	3–1	1–1
Szarvas	1–7	Sándorfalva	1–3	0–4
Kecskeméti TE II	2–3	Szolnok	1–1	1–2
Salgótarján	4–0	Emőd	4–0	0–0

==== Details ====
All times Central European Summer Time (UTC+2)

7 June 2026
15:00

Nagyatád	0–4	Mátészalka
	Report	Vámos 4' (pen.); Jene 17', 44'; Mező 83'

Mudin Imre Sportcentrum, Nagyatád
Attendance: 550
Referee: Árpád Jakab
14 June 2026
15:00

Mátészalka	7–1	Nagyatád
Molnár 8'; Rubus 11'; Gyurján 32'; Sárosi 35'; Bényei 60'; Torkos 64', 75'	Report	Dekanics 47' (pen.)

Városi Sporttelep, Mátészalka
Referee: Dr. Mátyás Benedek Dédesi

Mátészalka won 11–1 on aggregate and are promoted to the Nemzeti Bajnokság III.

7 June 2026
17:30

Hajdúnánás	2–2	Balatonalmádi
G. Tóth 12'; Pelles 56'	Report	Rédling 72'; Kiss 75'

Hajdúnánási Sporttelep, Hajdúnánás
Attendance: 852
Referee: Csaba Sándor
14 June 2026
17:00

Balatonalmádi	0–3	Hajdúnánás
	Report	G. Tóth 25'; Pelles 45+4'; Gellén 49' (pen.)

Balatonalmádi Sportközpont, Balatonalmádi
Referee: Árpád Jakab

Hajdúnánás won 5–2 on aggregate and are promoted to the Nemzeti Bajnokság III.

7 June 2026
17:30

Mohács	0–2	Király
	Report	Karvalics 62'; Hegyi 87'

Újvárosi Stadion, Mohács
Referee: Gábor Iványi
14 June 2026
17:00

Király	3–2	Mohács
Hegyi 19'; Szabó 30'; Gombás 88'	Report	Rázsics 32', 69' (pen.)

Király Sportlétesítmény, Szombathely
Attendance: 500
Referee: Kevin Linn

Király won 5–2 on aggregate and are promoted to the Nemzeti Bajnokság III.

7 June 2026
17:30

Sárisáp	1–3	Zalaegerszeg II
Vígh 45+4'	Report	Leonardy 23', 60'; Bobson 77' (pen.)

Sárisápi Bányász SE Sporttelep, Sárisáp
Attendance: 400
Referee: Ákos Takács
14 June 2026
17:00

Zalaegerszeg II	4–1	Sárisáp
Ayodele 49'; Bobson 51'; Nagy 55'; Leonardy 89'	Report	Mészáros 36'

ZTE Arena, Zalaegerszeg
Attendance: 650
Referee: Patrik Horváth

Zalaegerszeg II won 7–2 on aggregate and are promoted to the Nemzeti Bajnokság III.

7 June 2026
17:30

Sárbogárd	3–1	Dunavarsány
Fehér 15'; Á. Horváth 73'; Pákozdi 80'	Report	Vastag 17'

Sárbogárd Sporttelep, Sárbogárd
Attendance: 400
Referee: Gergely Bana
14 June 2026
17:00

Dunavarsány	1–1	Sárbogárd
Borsos 55'	Report	Rodenbücher 90+3'

Dunavarsányi TE Sporttelep, Dunavarsány
Referee: Tamás Ujhegyi

Sárbogárd won 4–2 on aggregate and are promoted to the Nemzeti Bajnokság III.

7 June 2026
17:30

Szarvas	1–3	Sándorfalva
Kepenyes 38'	Report	Gyuga 35'; Csicsely 55'; Oláh 89'

Erzsébet-ligeti Sporttelep, Szarvas
Attendance: 1,200
Referee: Dávid Práth
14 June 2026
17:00

Sándorfalva	4–0	Szarvas
Rabecz 20', 58'; Csicsely 43'; Oláh 86'	Report

Sándorfalva Sporttelep, Sándorfalva
Attendance: 580
Referee: Vilmos Hartung Jr.

Sándorfalva won 7–1 on aggregate and are promoted to the Nemzeti Bajnokság III.

7 June 2026
17:30

Kecskeméti TE II	1–1	Szolnok
Sódar 1'	Report	Dósa 47'

Széktói Stadion, Kecskemét
Attendance: 500
Referee: Gergő Muhari
14 June 2026
17:00

Szolnok	2–1	Kecskeméti TE II
Pinto 17'; Lengyel 22'	Report	Pljesovszki 48'

Tiszaligeti Stadion, Szolnok
Referee: Márió Zimmermann

Szolnok won 3–2 on aggregate and are promoted to the Nemzeti Bajnokság III.

7 June 2026
17:30

Salgótarján	4–0	Emőd
Papucsek 15' (pen.); Járvás 25'; M. Nagy 48'; Kerek 75'	Report

Tó-strand Sporttelep, Salgótarján
Attendance: 620
Referee: Barnabás Drabon
14 June 2026
17:00

Emőd	0–0	Salgótarján
	Report

Emőd Sporttelep, Emőd
Attendance: 300
Referee: Csaba Sándor

Salgótarján won 4–0 on aggregate and are promoted to the Nemzeti Bajnokság III.

== Promoted teams ==
Ten clubs initially secured promotion from the county championships to the 2026–27 Nemzeti Bajnokság III. SZAC and Gyöngyös were awarded direct promotion after their prospective play-off opponents did not compete, while eight other clubs advanced by winning their promotion play-offs. Mátészalka recorded the largest aggregate victory, defeating Nagyatád 11–1, while Szolnok won the closest tie, overcoming Kecskeméti TE II 3–2 on aggregate. Hajdúnánás returned to the Nemzeti Bajnokság III after an 18-year absence by defeating Balatonalmádi 5–2 on aggregate. Király defeated Mohács 5–2 on aggregate despite a much closer second leg, Zalaegerszeg II overcame Sárisáp 7–2 on aggregate by winning both matches, Sárbogárd defeated Dunavarsány 4–2 on aggregate, Sándorfalva eliminated Szarvas 7–1 on aggregate, and Salgótarján advanced with a 4–0 aggregate victory over Emőd.

Before the start of the season, however, Gyöngyös withdrew from the competition, while Putnok did not submit an entry and Balatonlelle declined the opportunity to remain in the league. As a result, the Hungarian Football Federation admitted play-off losers Balatonalmádi and Sárisáp, along with relegated Pápa, to complete the 2026–27 Nemzeti Bajnokság III field.

Form of promotion	No	Teams
Promotion play-offs winners	8	Hajdúnánás, Király, Mátészalka, Salgótarján, Sándorfalva, Sárbogárd, Szolnok, Zalaegerszeg II
Direct promotion	1	SZAC
Replenished after withdrawals	2	Balatonalmádi, Sárisáp

== See also ==
- 2025–26 Magyar Kupa
- 2025–26 Nemzeti Bajnokság I
- 2025–26 Nemzeti Bajnokság II
- 2025–26 Nemzeti Bajnokság III
