= 2023–24 Nemzeti Bajnokság III =

Nemzeti Bajnokság III
- Season: 2023–24
- Champions: Tatabánya (Northwest); Putnok (Northeast); Szentlőrinc (Southwest); Békéscsaba (Southeast)
- Promoted: Tatabánya; Szentlőrinc; Békéscsaba
- Relegated: Haladás VSE; Zalaegerszeg II; Csorna; Salgótarján; Rákospalota; Gyöngyös; Mohács; Fehérvár II; Dunaújváros; Szeged II; Füzesgyarmat; Cegléd

The 2023–24 Nemzeti Bajnokság III is Hungary's third-level football competition.

== Overview ==
Compared to last season, instead of 3 groups of 20 teams, 16 teams will compete in 4 groups. Out of the four group winners, two team will be promoted via promotion play-offs. The last 3 teams in each group and the two worst 13th placed team will get relegated.

== Teams ==
The following teams have changed division since the 2022–23 season.

=== Team changes ===
==== To NB III ====
Relegated from 2022–23 Nemzeti Bajnokság II	Promoted from 2022–23 Megyei Bajnokság I
▼ Szentlőrinc ▼ Békéscsaba ▼ Dorog	▲ Mohács (Baranya) ▲ Cigánd (Borsod-Abaúj-Zemplén) ▲ Rákospalota (Budapest) ▲ Szeged II (Csongrád-Csanád) ▲ Gárdony (Fejér) ▲ Sopron (Győr-Moson-Sopron) ▲ Gyöngyös (Heves) ▲ Martfű (Jász-Nagykun-Szolnok) ▲ Salgótarján (Nógrád) ▲ Dunaföldvár (Tolna) ▲ Haladás VSE (Vas)

==== From NB III ====
Promoted to 2023–24 Nemzeti Bajnokság II	Relegated to 2023–24 Megyei Bajnokság I
▲BVSC-Zugló	▼ Békéscsaba II (Békés) ▼ Mór (Fejér) ▼ Hajdúszoboszló (Hajdú-Bihar) ▼ Jászberény (Jász-Nagykun-Szolnok) ▼ Bánk (Nógrád) ▼ Zsámbék (Pest) ▼ Teskánd (Zala)

=== Stadium and locations ===
Location of teams and stadiums in 2023–24 Nemzeti Bajnokság III.
Green: Northwest, Red: Northeast, Blue: Southwest, Yellow: Southeast
Location of Budapest metropolitan area teams.
Green: Northwest, Red: Northeast, Blue: Southwest, Yellow: Southeast

Following is the list of clubs competing in the league this season, with their location, stadium and stadium capacity.

==== Northwest ====
Team	Location	Stadium	Capacity
III. Kerület	Budapest (Óbuda)	Hévízi úti Stadion	914
Balatonfüred	Balatonfüred	Balatonfüredi Sporttelep	
Bicske	Bicske	Bicskei Sportpálya	
Budaörs	Budaörs	Árok utcai Stadion	1,300
Csorna	Csorna	Kocsis István Városi Sporttelep	760
Dorog	Dorog	Buzánszky Jenő Stadion	5,000
Gyirmót II	Győr (Gyirmót)	Alcufer Stadion	2,291
Győr II	Győr (Gyárváros)	ETO Park, Camping Pálya	1,000
Haladás VSE	Szombathely	Haladás Sporttelep	
Kelen	Budapest (Kelenföld)	Hunyadi Mátyás utca	1,500
Komárom	Komárom	Czibor Zoltán Városi Sporttelep	4,132
Puskás Akadémia II	Felcsút	PFLA füves IV. pálya	
Sopron	Sopron	Káposztás utcai Stadion	4,500
Tatabánya	Tatabánya	Grosics Gyula Stadion	5,021
Veszprém	Veszprém	Városi Stadion	4,000
Zalaegerszeg II	Zalaegerszeg	ZTE Arena, Artificial turf pitch	1,000

==== Northeast ====
Team	Location	Stadium	Capacity
Cigánd	Cigánd	Cigándi Sportpálya	1,000
Debreceni EAC	Debrecen	Dóczy József utcai Sportpálya	3,200
Debreceni VSC II	Debrecen	Dóczy József utcai Sportpálya	3,200
Diósgyőr II	Miskolc (Diósgyőr)	DVTK Stadion II	
Eger	Eger	Szentmarjay Tibor Városi Stadion	6,000
Gyöngyös	Gyöngyös	Kömlei Károly Városi Sporttelep	
Hatvan	Hatvan	Népkert Sporttelep	
Karcag	Tiszafüred	Lipcsey Elemér Sporttelep (Note: Karcag play their home games at Lipcsey Elemár Sporttelep until spring 2024 due to the rebuilding of their own stadium.)	
Kisvárda II	Kisvárda	Várkerti Stadion	2,993
Putnok	Putnok	Várady Béla Sportközpont	3,000
Rákospalota	Budapest (Rákospalota)	Stadion Budai II. Laszló	10,000
Salgótarján	Salgótarján	Szojka Ferenc Stadion	7,000
Sényő	Sényő	Sényői Sportpálya	
Tiszafüred	Tiszafüred	Lipcsey Elemér Sporttelep	
Tiszaújváros	Tiszaújváros	Tiszaújvárosi Sport Park	4,000
Újpest II	Budapest (Újpest)	Chinoin Sport és Szabadidő Központ	700

==== Southwest ====
Team	Location	Stadium	Capacity
Dunaföldvár	Dunaföldvár	Dunaföldvári Sportpálya	
Dunaújváros	Dunaújváros	Eszperantó úti Stadion	12,000
Érd	Érd	Ercsi úti Pálya	3,500
Fehérvár II	Székesfehérvár	Sóstói Stadion, Artificial turf pitch	280
Ferencváros II	Budapest (Ferencváros)	Sárosi György pálya	3,000
Gárdony	Gárdony	Agárdi Parkerdő Sportközpont	1,400
Iváncsa	Iváncsa	Károlyi István Sporttelep	
Kaposvár	Kaposvár	Rákóczi Stadion	7,000
Majos	Bonyhád (Majos)	Majosi Sportpálya	600
Mohács	Mohács	Újvárosi Stadion	4,000
MTK Budapest II	Budapest (Józsefváros)	Sándor Károly Labdarúgó Akadémia	
Nagykanizsa	Nagykanizsa	Olajbányász Sporttelep	7,000
Paks II	Paks	Fehérvári úti Stadion, Artificial turf pitch	
PEAC	Pécs	Stadion PMFC	7,000
Szekszárd	Szekszárd	Városi Stadion	7,500
Szentlőrinc	Szentlőrinc	Szentlőrinci Sportpálya	1,020

==== Southeast ====
Team	Location	Stadium	Capacity
Békéscsaba	Békéscsaba	Kórház utcai Stadion	2,479
BKV Előre	Budapest (Józsefváros)	Sport utcai Stadion	2,500
Budapest Honvéd II	Budapest (Kispest)	Honvéd MFA Utánpótlás Központ	
Cegléd	Cegléd	Zsengellér Gyula Sportcentrum	4,000
Dabas	Dabas	Wellis Sportpark	2,500
ESMTK	Budapest (Pesterzsébet)	Ady Endre utca	5,000
Füzesgyarmat	Füzesgyarmat	Lázár Gyula Sportközpont	
Hódmezővásárhely	Hódmezővásárhely	Városi Stadion	10,000
Kecskemét II	Kecskemét	Műkertvárosi Sportcentrum	
Körösladány	Körösladány	Wenckheim Béla utcai sportpálya	
Martfű	Martfű	LSE Sporttelep	
Monor	Monor	Balassi Bálint utcai Stadion	2,250
Pénzügyőr	Budapest (Pasarét)	NAV Sporttelep	3,000
Szeged II	Szeged	Szent Gellért Fórum	8,136
Szolnok	Szolnok	Tiszaligeti Stadion	3,437
Vasas II	Budapest (Angyalföld)	Illovszky Rudolf Stadion	1,000

== Standings ==
=== Northwest ===
Pos	Team	Pld	W	D	L	GF	GA	GD	Pts	Promotion or relegation
1	Tatabánya (C, O, P)	30	20	6	4	59	28	+31	66	Qualification to promotion play-offs
2	Bicske	30	19	6	5	52	29	+23	63	
3	Veszprém	30	19	5	6	60	36	+24	62	
4	III. Kerület	30	18	7	5	58	30	+28	61	
5	Gyirmót II	30	13	8	9	62	59	+3	47	
6	Budaörs	30	13	6	11	60	54	+6	45	
7	Dorog	30	11	8	11	44	43	+1	41	
8	Puskás Akadémia II	30	10	10	10	49	36	+13	40	
9	Komárom	30	9	13	8	37	36	+1	40	
10	Sopron	30	9	9	12	39	39	0	36	
11	Győr II	30	10	4	16	51	51	0	34	
12	Balatonfüred	30	8	9	13	35	52	−17	33	
13	Kelen	30	9	5	16	33	55	−22	32	Possible Relegation to Megyei Bajnokság I
14	Haladás VSE (R)	30	7	5	18	39	62	−23	26	Relegation to Megyei Bajnokság I
15	Zalaegerszeg II (R)	30	5	5	20	29	64	−35	20	Relegation to Megyei Bajnokság I
16	Csorna (R)	30	5	4	21	32	65	−33	19	Relegation to Megyei Bajnokság I

Updated to match(es) played on 26 May 2024. Source: Hungarian Football Federation
Rules for classification: 1) Points; 2) Matches won; 3) Goal difference; 4) Goals scored; 5) Head-to-head points; 6) Head-to-head goal difference; 7) Fair play ranking; 8) Drawing of lots.
(C) Champions; (O) Play-off winners; (P) Promoted; (R) Relegated

=== Northeast ===
Pos	Team	Pld	W	D	L	GF	GA	GD	Pts	Promotion or relegation
1	Putnok (C)	30	19	6	5	73	25	+48	63	Qualification to promotion play-offs
2	Cigánd	30	16	10	4	51	23	+28	58	
3	Kisvárda II	30	16	6	8	46	34	+12	54	
4	Debreceni VSC II	30	15	5	10	63	41	+22	50	
5	Debreceni EAC	30	13	10	7	41	34	+7	49	
6	Tiszaújváros	30	12	10	8	49	37	+12	46	
7	Újpest II	30	13	5	12	54	49	+5	44	
8	Karcag	30	12	8	10	42	39	+3	44	
9	Eger	30	11	8	11	36	40	−4	41	
10	Tiszafüred	30	10	8	12	46	51	−5	38	
11	Sényő	30	9	9	12	46	55	−9	36	
12	Hatvan	30	9	9	12	32	44	−12	36	
13	Diósgyőr II	30	9	8	13	41	44	−3	35	Possible Relegation to Megyei Bajnokság I
14	Salgótarján (R)	30	8	10	12	36	47	−11	34	Relegation to Megyei Bajnokság I
15	Rákospalota (R)	30	7	3	20	34	69	−35	24	Relegation to Megyei Bajnokság I
16	Gyöngyös (R)	30	1	5	24	23	81	−58	8	Relegation to Megyei Bajnokság I

Updated to match(es) played on 26 May 2024. Source: Hungarian Football Federation
Rules for classification: 1) Points; 2) Matches won; 3) Goal difference; 4) Goals scored; 5) Head-to-head points; 6) Head-to-head goal difference; 7) Fair play ranking; 8) Drawing of lots.
(C) Champions; (R) Relegated

=== Southwest ===
Pos	Team	Pld	W	D	L	GF	GA	GD	Pts	Promotion or relegation
1	Szentlőrinc (C, O, P)	30	23	6	1	78	21	+57	75	Qualification to promotion play-offs
2	Iváncsa	30	24	2	4	78	24	+54	74	
3	Nagykanizsa	30	18	7	5	70	38	+32	61	
4	Kaposvár	30	16	10	4	60	31	+29	58	
5	Dunaföldvár	30	16	5	9	61	40	+21	53	
6	Ferencváros II	30	16	4	10	51	32	+19	52	
7	MTK Budapest II	30	9	10	11	41	47	−6	37	
8	Paks II	30	10	4	16	54	63	−9	34	
9	Érd	30	9	5	16	42	64	−22	32	
10	Majos	30	9	4	17	31	58	−27	31	
11	Gárdony	30	8	6	16	48	74	−26	30	
12	Szekszárd	30	7	9	14	31	52	−21	30	
13	PEAC	30	7	7	16	28	46	−18	28	Possible Relegation to Megyei Bajnokság I
14	Mohács (R)	30	6	7	17	28	48	−20	25	Relegation to Megyei Bajnokság I
15	Fehérvár II (R)	30	6	7	17	36	59	−23	25	Relegation to Megyei Bajnokság I
16	Dunaújváros (R)	30	6	7	17	24	64	−40	25	Relegation to Megyei Bajnokság I

Updated to match(es) played on 26 May 2024. Source: Hungarian Football Federation
Rules for classification: 1) Points; 2) Matches won; 3) Goal difference; 4) Goals scored; 5) Head-to-head points; 6) Head-to-head goal difference; 7) Fair play ranking; 8) Drawing of lots.
(C) Champions; (O) Play-off winners; (P) Promoted; (R) Relegated

=== Southeast ===
Pos	Team	Pld	W	D	L	GF	GA	GD	Pts	Promotion or relegation
1	Békéscsaba (C, P)	30	26	3	1	86	21	+65	81	Qualification to promotion play-offs
2	ESMTK	30	20	5	5	72	28	+44	65	
3	Hódmezővásárhely	30	17	9	4	46	24	+22	60	
4	Körösladány	30	16	7	7	60	43	+17	55	
5	Szolnok	30	14	7	9	54	44	+10	49	
6	Vasas II	30	13	8	9	58	41	+17	47	
7	BKV Előre	30	14	4	12	52	52	0	46	
8	Monor	30	12	3	15	48	55	−7	39	
9	Dabas	30	9	8	13	40	57	−17	35	
10	Martfű	30	10	4	16	49	66	−17	34	
11	Kecskemét II	30	9	7	14	52	41	+11	34	
12	Honvéd II	30	9	7	14	53	56	−3	34	
13	Pénzügyőr	30	8	8	14	38	46	−8	32	Possible Relegation to Megyei Bajnokság I
14	Szeged II (R)	30	6	7	17	37	46	−9	25	Relegation to Megyei Bajnokság I
15	Füzesgyarmat (R)	30	7	3	20	32	86	−54	24	Relegation to Megyei Bajnokság I
16	Cegléd (R)	30	3	4	23	29	100	−71	13	Relegation to Megyei Bajnokság I

Updated to match(es) played on 26 May 2024. Source: Hungarian Football Federation
Rules for classification: 1) Points; 2) Matches won; 3) Goal difference; 4) Goals scored; 5) Head-to-head points; 6) Head-to-head goal difference; 7) Fair play ranking; 8) Drawing of lots.
(C) Champions; (P) Promoted; (R) Relegated

== Promotion play-offs ==
=== Overview ===
In Play-off matches between finished 1st of 4 group respectively will ahead of promotion to Nemzeti Bajnokság II is two teams winner.

Team 1	Agg.	Team 2	1st leg	2nd leg
Tatabánya	4–3	Békéscsaba	2–2	2–1
Putnok	1–3	Szentlőrinc	1–1	0–2

=== Final 1st leg ===
2 June 2024
21:00 UTC+7:00/CET

Putnok	1–1	Szentlőrinc

Várady Béla Sportközpont, Putnok
2 June 2024
21:00 UTC+7:00/CET

Tatabánya	2–2	Békéscsaba

Grosics Gyula Stadium, Tatabánya

=== Final 2nd leg ===
9 June 2024
21:00 UTC+7:00/ CET

Szentlőrinc	2–0	Putnok

Szentlőrinci Sportpálya, Szentlőrinc

Szentlőrinc won 3–1 on aggregate and promoted to NB II, whereas Putnok was remained in NB III.

9 June 2024
21:00 UTC+7:00/ CET

Békéscsaba	1–2	Tatabánya

Kórház utcai Stadion, Békéscsaba

Tatabánya won 3–4 on aggregate and promoted to the NB II, whereas Békéscsaba remained in the NB III but was promoted to the NB II due to the dissolving Haladás.

== See also ==
- 2023–24 Magyar Kupa
- 2023–24 Nemzeti Bajnokság I
- 2023–24 Nemzeti Bajnokság II
- 2023–24 Megyei Bajnokság I
