= Nyergesújfalu SE =

Hungarian football club

Nyergesújfalu Sport Egyesület
- Full name: Nyergesújfalu Sport Egyesület
- Founded: 1945
- Website: http://nyergesujfalufc.hu/
Home colours

Nyergesújfalu Sport Egyesület is a professional football club based in Nyergesújfalu, Komárom-Esztergom County, Hungary.

== History ==
Nyergesújfalu was founded in 1944.

By 1948, the team—composed of Sági-Novák, Hédl I, Hédl II, Fábián, Tölösy, Forgács, Sütő, Szoláry, Nagy K, Mogyórósi, Varga, Hargitai, and Németh—was already playing in Nemzeti Bajnokság II.

After 1956, the team was led by Kinczel and Ferenc Hédl. Izidor Horváth served as the head of the soccer department. At that time, the team was bolstered by I. Tóth, L. Pap, Goldschmidt, Molnár, Hack, M. Fenyvesi, and Mátyás Imre.

After the 1950s, under the guidance of coach L. Kinczel, many young players developed in the club’s own youth system joined the team. Among them were Bábszki, Lohner, and Kozma.

In the spring of 1965, the team was once again playing in Nemzeti Bajnokság III, bolstered by Lédergerber, who had been signed from Eternit, and two homegrown players—Pataki and Schrenk. Later, Kisgyőri and Vereb, signed from Debrecen, also joined the team.

In 1967, the team—composed of Szikora, Barak, Magyar, Kulcsár, Kocsis, Hack, Goldschmidt, Rausch, Kis, Vereb, Mayer, Lipót, Csímár, Primusz, Katona, and Fekete—finished in sixth place in Nemzeti Bajnokság III, followed by a relegation to Megyei Bajnokság I.

In 1984, under the guidance of coaches Ignác Tóth and János Dóka, the team won the county championship again after a long hiatus. The team included Bulfán, Ozsgyán, Temesi, Szabó, Vanek, Róth, Szalai, Bodrogi, Farkas, Nyikes, Schulhoff, Jánosi, Varga S, Kovács, Dibusz, Páncsics, Szoboszlai, and Dudás.

The section head, Izodor Horváth, retired and was succeeded by Mihály Gurgulits; Kálmán Sikes then became the section president.

In 1986, the team was back in NB II, where it finished in 7th place.

The team began the 1987 season under the guidance of coach Dr. György Magyar. It was then that Csábi from Lábatlan, Schalk from Tokod, the Manga brothers, and Tibor Bohner from Süttő joined the club.

In 1988, István Borbély became the head of the department; at that time, the team was moving back and forth between the county championship and NB III.

In the early 1990s, János Varga and then Ferenc Gabala served as coaches, while József Bábszki managed the division, assisted by János Pajor. Under Ferenc Gabala, the team won the Komárom-Esztergom County First Division championship with a perfect record. The team returned to NB III with a new coach, József Straub, who was soon replaced on the bench by József Mezei.

In 1995, János Pajor became the head of the sports department. That year, the team competed in the county championship. At that time, Antal Róth took over as head coach.

At that time, the club was still operating under the name VISCOSA SE. With the reorganization of VISCOSA, the club also became the Zoltek Nyergesújfalu Sports Association.

== Name changes ==
- Magyar Viscosa Sportegyesület 1945 – 1951
- Nyergesújfalusi Szikra 1951 – 1952
- Nyergesújfalusi Viscosa Szikra 1952 – ?
- Viscosa Sportegyesület ? – 1998
- Zoltek Nyergesújfalu Sportegyesület 1998 – 2013
- Nyergesújfalu Sportegyesület 2013 – present

== Honours ==
=== League ===
- Nemzeti Bajnokság III:
  - Winners (1): 1957–58

== Seasons ==
The table below shows the seasons of Nyergesújfalu SE.

Season	Tier	Club's name	Position	Pts
1945–46	2	Magyar Viscosa	0 / 12	
1946–47	3	Magyar Viscosa	8 / 16	20
1947–48	3	Viscosa SE (Nyergesújfalu)	2 / 16	45
1948–49	2	Viscosa SE	5 / 16	34
1949–50	2	Magyar Viscosa SE	9 / 16	28
1950	2	Viscosa Nyergesújfalu	13 / 16	13
1951	3	Nyergesújfalui Szikra	2 / 10	23
1952	3	Nyergesújfalusi Viscosa Szikra	2 / 14	37
1953	3	Nyergesújfalusi Szikra Viscosa	1 / 18	41
1954	3	Nyergesújfalui Viscosa	9 / 16	34
1955	3	Nyergesújfalui Viscosa	12 / 16	26
1956	3	Nyergesújfalusi Viscosa	8 / 16	30
1957	3	Nyergesújfalusi Viscosa	2 / 9	21
1957–58	3	Nyergesújfalui Viscosa SE	1 / 18	52
1958–59	3	Nyergesújfalui Viscosa	5 / 16	35
1959–60	3	Nyergesújfalui Viscosa SE	3 / 16	35
1960–61	3	Nyergesújfalui Viscosa	8 / 16	30
1961–62	3	Nyergesújfalui Viscosa	5 / 16	35
1962–63	3	Nyergesújfalui Viscosa	16 / 16	23
1963	4	Nyergesújfalui Viscosa	14 / 16	10
1964	4	Nyergesújfalui Viscosa	7 / 16	29
1965	4	Nyergesújfalui Viscosa	14 / 16	23
1966	5	Nyergesújfalusi Viscosa SE	1 / 16	40
1967	4	Nyergesújfalui Viscosa SE	6 / 16	31
1968	4	Nyergesújfalui Viscosa SE	14 / 16	21
1969	5	Magyar Viscosa SE	1 / 18	53
1970	4	Nyergesújfalui Viscosa SE	16 / 16	8
1970–71	4	Nyergesújfalui Viscosa SE	16 / 16	14
1971–72	5	Nyergesújfalui Viscosa	2 / 13	35
1972–73	5	Nyergesújfalui Viscosa	4 / 16	41
1973–74	5	Nyergesújfalui Viscosa	6 / 16	34
1974–75	4	Nyergesújfalui Viscosa	6 / 16	34
1975–76	4	Nyergesújfalui Viscosa	9 / 16	24
1976–77	4	Nyergesújfalui Viscosa	14 / 16	18
1977–78	4	Nyergesújfalusi Viscosa	5 / 16	37
1978–79	3	Nyergesújfalusi Viscosa	4 / 16	36
1979–80	3	Nyergesújfalusi Viscosa	3 / 16	41
1980–81	3	Nyergesújfalusi Viscosa	4 / 16	40
1981–82	4	Nyergesújfalusi Viscosa SE	2 / 16	46
1982–83	4	Nyergesújfalu Viscosa SE	1 / 16	48
1983–84	3	Magyar Viscosa SE	13 / 18	32
1984–85	3	Nyergesújfalusi Viscosa	7 / 18	37
1985–86	3	Nyergesújfalui Viscosa SE	14 / 18	31
1986–87	3	Magyar Viscosa SE	17 / 18	19
1987–88	4	Nyergesújfalu Viscosa SE	1 / 16	44
1988–89	3	Magyar Viscosa SE	14 / 16	21
1989–90	4	Nyergesújfalui Viscosa	2 / 14	33
1990–91	4	Nyergesújfalui Viscosa	7 / 15	30
1991–92	4	Nyergesújfalui Viscosa	1 / 14	49
1992–93	3	Magyar Viscosa SE	16 / 16	17
1993–94	4	Magyar Viscosa SE	1 / 16	60
1994–95	3	Magyar Viscosa SE	14 / 16	33
1995–96	4	Magyar Viscosa SE	1 / 16	70
1996–97	3	Magyar Viscosa Nyergesújfalu	16 / 16	12
1997–98	4	Zoltek SE Nyergesújfalu	14 / 16	16
1998–99	5	Zoltek SE	1 / 16	69
1999–00	5	Zoltek SE	3 / 14	52
2000–01	5	Zoltek SE	2 / 14	52
2001–02	5	Zoltek SE Nyergesújfalu	8 / 14	34
2002–03	5	Zoltek SE-Nyergesújfalu	3 / 14	46
2003–04	5	Zoltek SE	1 / 14	57
2004–05	5	Zoltek SE	4 / 16	54
2005–06	4	Zoltek SE Nyergesújfalu	14 / 16	27
2006–07	5	Zoltek SE	5 / 14	42
2007–08	5	Zoltek SE-Nyergesújfalu	2 / 16	68
2008–09	4	Zoltek SE	14 / 16	26
2009–10	4	Zoltek SE	15 / 16	9
2010–11	4	Zoltek Nyergesújfalu SE	5 / 16	46
2011–12	4	Zoltek SE	8 / 16	46
2012–13	4	Zoltek Nyergesújfalu SE	15 / 15	8
2013–14	5	Nyergesújfalu SE	5 / 16	62
2014–15	5	Nyergesújfalu SE	2 / 16	66
2015–16	4	Nyergesújfalu SE	12 / 16	24
2016–17	4	Nyergesújfalu SE	5 / 13	43
2016–17	4	Nyergesújfalu SE	5 / 14	40
2017–18	4	Nyergesújfalu SE	10 / 16	33
2018–19	4	Nyergesújfalu SE	5 / 14	43
2019–20	4	Nyergesújfalu SE	5 / 13	33
2020–21	4	Nyergesújfalu SE	3 / 6	61
2021–22	4	Nyergesújfalu SE	3 / 13	47
2022–23	4	Nyergesújfalu SE	1 / 12	66
2023–24	4	Nyergesújfalu SE	1 / 13	55
2024–25	4	Nyergesújfalu SE	5 / 13	51
2025–26	4	Nyergesújfalu SE	7 / 12	41
