= Nagyecsed RSE =

Hungarian football club

- Full name: Nagyecsed Rákóczi Sportegyesület
- Founded: 1968
- Ground: Szatmári utca
Home colours

Nagyecsed Rákóczi Sportegyesület is a professional football club based in Nagyecsed, Szabolcs–Szatmár–Bereg County, Hungary.

== History ==
Nagyecsed won the Tisza group of the 2010–11 Nemzeti Bajnokság III season. However, the club did not gain promotion to the second division.

In the 2015–16 Magyar Kupa season, Nagyecsed hosted Ferencvárosi TC and lost to 10–0.

== Name changes ==
- Nagyecsedi BSE: ? - 1948
- Nagyecsedi SE: 1948 - 1949
- Nagyecsedi EPOSz: 1949 - 1950
- Nagyecsedi DISz: 1950 - 1951
- Nagyecsedi Traktor: 1951 - 1957
- Nagyecsedi Hunyadi: 1957 - 1957
- Nagyecsedi MEDOSz: 1957 - ?
- Nagyecsedi TSZ SK: ? - ?
- Nagyecsedi SE: ? - ?
- Nagyecsed Rákóczi Sportegyesület: ? -

== Honours ==
=== League ===
- Nemzeti Bajnokság III:
  - Winners (1): 2010–11

== Seasons ==
The table below shows the seasons of Nagyecsed RSE.

Season	Tier	Club's name	Position	Pts
1947–48	4	Nagyecsedi BSE	7 / 12	19
1948–49	4	Nagyecsedi SE	5 / 14	29
1949–50	4	Nagyecsedi EPOSz	13 / 16	22
1950	4	Nagyecsedi DISz	3 / 12	14
1951	4	Nagyecsed	0 / 8	
1952	4	Nagyecsed	0 / 7	
1955	4	Nagyecsedi Traktor	13 / 14	19
1956	4	Nagyecsedi Traktor	6 / 14	23
1957	4	Nagyecsedi MEDOSz	2 / 10	25
1957–58	4	Nagyecsedi Hunyadi	8 / 14	24
1958–59	4	Nagyecsedi MEDOSz	10 / 16	21
1959–60	4	Nagyecsedi MEDOSZ	10 / 16	27
1960–61	4	Nagyecsed	12 / 18	27
1961–62	4	Nagyecsedi TSZ	11 / 16	23
1962–63	4	Nagyecsedi MEDOSZ	14 / 16	19
1963	5	Nagyecsedi MEDOSZ	14 / 18	9
1964	5	Nagyecsedi TSZ SK	12 / 18	23
1965	5	Nagyecsed	0 / 17	
1966	6	Nagyecsed	11 / 14	22
1967	6	Nagyecsed	5 / 14	32
1968	6	Nagyecsed	1 / 14	40
1969	5	Nagyecsedi TSZ	7 / 16	28
1970	5	Nagyecsedi TSZ	1 / 8	20
1970–71	5	Nagyecsedi TSZ	6 / 16	35
1971–72	5	Nagyecsedi TSZ	12 / 16	23
1972–73	5	Nagyecsedi TSZ	6 / 16	28
1973–74	5	Nagyecsedi TSZ SK	14 / 16	24
1974–75	5	Nagyecsedi TSZ	5 / 16	29
1975–76	5	Nagyecsedi TSZ SE	9 / 16	28
1976–77	5	Nagyecsedi TSZ	7 / 16	32
1977–78	5	Nagyecsedi TSZ	5 / 16	36
1978–79	4	Nagyecsedi TSZ SE	12 / 18	25
1979–80	4	Nagyecsedi TSZ SE	6 / 16	31
1980–81	4	Nagyecsedi TSZ SE	9 / 16	33
1981–82	4	Nagyecsedi TSz SK	16 / 18	19
1982–83	5	Nagyecsed	1 / 14	46
1983–84	4	Nagyecsedi TSZ SE	3 / 18	47
1984–85	4	Nagyecsedi TSZ SE	2 / 18	46
1985–86	4	Nagyecsedi TSZ SE	7 / 16	31
1986–87	4	Nagyecsedi TSZ SE	3 / 16	38
1987–88	4	Nagyecsedi TSZ SE	2 / 16	38
1988–89	4	Nagyecsedi TSZ SE	6 / 16	34
1989–90	4	Nagyecsedi TSZ SE	7 / 16	31
1990–91	4	Nagyecsedi TSZ SE	13 / 16	24
1991–92	4	Nagyecsedi SE	15 / 16	16
1992–93	5	Nagyecsedi Rákóczi SE	12 / 16	28
1993–94	5	Nagyecsedi Rákóczi SE	7 / 16	30
1994–95	5	Nagyecsed	3 / 14	52
1995–96	5	Nagyecsed	8 / 14	29
1996–97	5	Nagyecsedi Rákóczi SE	4 / 16	62
1997–98	6	Nagyecsed	1 / 16	68
1998–99	5	Nagyecsedi Rákóczi SE	10 / 16	42
1999–00	5	Nagyecsedi Rákóczi SE	3 / 16	49
2000–01	5	Nagyecsedi Rákóczi SE	5 / 16	49
2001–02	5	Nagyecsed	6 / 16	46
2002–03	5	Nagyecsed SE	9 / 16	36
2003–04	5	Nagyecsed	8 / 16	43
2004–05	5	Nagyecsed	10 / 16	41
2005–06	4	Nagyecsed	3 / 16	60
2006–07	4	Nagyecsed	1 / 16	67
2007–08	3	Nagyecsed Rákóczi SE	6 / 16	53
2008–09	3	Nagyecsed RSE	2 / 16	57
2009–10	3	Nagyecsed Rákóczi SE	5 / 14	42
2010–11	3	Nagyecsed Rákóczi SE	1 / 16	64
2011–12	3	Nagyecsed RSE	8 / 16	46
2012–13	3	Nagyecsed RSE	12 / 14	23
2013–14	4	Nagyecsed RSE	15 / 16	24
2014–15	5	Nagyecsed RSE	1 / 16	90
2015–16	4	Nagyecsed Rákóczi SE	2 / 16	58
2016–17	4	Rákóczi SE Nagyecsed	2 / 16	48
2017–18	4	Nagyecsed Rákóczi SE	5 / 16	49
2018–19	4	Nagyecsed Rákóczi SE	1 / 16	60
2019–20	4	Nagyecsed Rákóczi SE	11 / 16	22
2020–21	4	Nagyecsed Rákóczi SE	2 / 16	62
2021–22	4	Nagyecsed Rákóczi SE	4 / 16	50
2022–23	4	Nagyecsed Rákóczi SE	8 / 16	35
2023–24	4	Nagyecsed Rákóczi SE	3 / 16	60
2024–25	4	Nagyecsed Rákóczi SE	6 / 15	43
2025–26	4	Nagyecsed Rákóczi SE	4 / 15	58
