= FC Dunaföldvár =

Hungarian football club

Dunaföldvár
- Full name: Futball Club Dunaföldvár
- Founded: 1925; 101 years ago, as Dunaföldvári Törekvés
- Ground: Dunaföldvári Sportpálya
- 2025–26: MB I Tolna, 7th of 7
Home colours	Away colours

Futball Club Dunaföldvár is a professional Hungarian football club based in the town of Dunaföldvár, in Tolna County. The club had withdrawn from the Hungarian league system ahead of the 2026–27 season.

== History ==
For the first time in seventeen years, Dunaföldvár won the Tolna Megyei Bajnokság I in the 2022–23 season. They earned promotion to the third tier, by defeating Semjénháza 10–2 on aggregate in the promotion play-offs.

The team's 2023–24 season started with the final of previous year's Tolna County Cup where they prevailed against Bátaszék by seven goals.

== Honours and achievements ==
=== County Leagues (Közép-Dunántúli / Tolna) ===
- Megyei Bajnokság I (level 4)
  - Winners (3): 1987–88, 2005–06, 2022–23
  - Runners-up (6): 1949–50, 1950, 1980–81, 1985–86, 1996–97, 2007–08
- Megyei Bajnokság II (level 5)
  - Winners (2): 1995–96, 2002–03
  - Runners-up (3): 1975–76, 1993–94, 2003–04
- Megyei Bajnokság III (level 6)
  - Runners-up (2): 1966, 1967

=== County Cups ===
- Tolna County Cup
  - Winners (1): 2023

== Seasons ==
As of 24 October 2026.

Season	Tier	Club's name	Position	Pts
1939–40	3	Dunaföldvári MOVE	3 / 12	28
1940–41	4	Dunaföldvári MOVE	7 / 9	0
1947–48	4	Dunaföldvári SE	3 / 12	31
1948–49	4	Dunaföldvári DSE	3 / 16	43
1949–50	4	Dunaföldvári DSE	2 / 16	41
1950	4	Dunaföldvári DSE	2 / 12	18
1951	3	Dunaföldvári DSK	4 / 14	35
1952	3	Dunaföldvári Spartacus	6 / 14	30
1953	3	Dunaföldvári Spartacus	5 / 14	32
1954	3	Dunaföldvári Spartacus	7 / 14	23
1955	3	Dunaföldvári Honvéd	3 / 14	37
1956	3	Dunaföldvár	6 / 14	27
1957	3	Dunaföldvári SE	4 / 5	5
1957–58	4	Dunaföldvári SE	7 / 13	25
1958–59	4	Dunaföldvári KSK	7 / 14	25
1959–60	4	Dunaföldvári KSK	10 / 16	21
1960–61	4	Dunaföldvár	11 / 16	22
1961–62	4	Dunaföldvár	11 / 16	27
1962–63	4	Dunaföldvár	6 / 16	35
1963	5	Dunaföldvár	4 / 16	19
1964	5	Dunaföldvári Vörös Lobogó	9 / 16	31
1965	5	Dunaföldvári Vörös Lobogó	16 / 16	12
1966	6	Dunaföldvár	2 / 12	30
1967	6	Dunaföldvár	2 / 14	28
1968	5	Dunaföldvár	15 / 16	16
1969	5	Dunaföldvár	12 / 16	26
1970	5	Dunaföldvár	7 / 9	11
1970–71	5	Dunaföldvár	11 / 18	34
1971–72	5	Dunaföldvár	9 / 16	26
1972–73	5	Dunaföldvár	15 / 16	10
1974–75	5	Dunaföldvár	8 / 14	25
1975–76	5	Dunaföldvár	2 / 10	25
1976–77	5	Dunaföldvár	4 / 9	17
1977–78	5	Dunaföldvár	5 / 10	17
1978–79	4	Dunaföldvár	3 / 10	20
1979–80	4	Dunaföldvár	4 / 14	35
1980–81	4	Dunaföldvár	2 / 14	34
1981–82	4	Dunaföldvári Szöv. Spartacus SE	11 / 16	26
1982–83	4	Dunaföldvár	6 / 16	33
1983–84	4	Dunaföldvári Spartacus	11 / 16	25
1984–85	4	Dunaföldvár	5 / 16	32
1985–86	4	Dunaföldvár	2 / 17	42
1986–87	4	Dunaföldvár	3 / 16	37
1987–88	4	Dunaföldvár	1 / 16	52
1988–89	3	Dunaföldvári SE	14 / 16	29
1989–90	4	Dunaföldvár	16 / 16	11
1992–93	5	Dunaföldvár	3 / 12	30
1993–94	5	Dunaföldvár	2 / 12	38
1994–95	5	Dunaföldvár	5 / 12	37
1995–96	5	Dunaföldvár	1 / 15	84
1996–97	4	Dunaföldvár	2 / 16	67
1997–98	4	Dunaföldvár	14 / 16	24
1998–99	5	Dunaföldvár	9 / 16	39
1999–00	5	Dunaföldvár	6 / 16	43
2000–01	5	Dunaföldvár	6 / 16	47
2001–02	5	Dunaföldvár FC	3 / 15	61
2002–03	5	Dunaföldvár FC	1 / 16	72
2003–04	5	Dunaföldvár	2 / 16	65
2004–05	5	Dunaföldvár	7 / 16	51
2005–06	4	Dunaföldvár FC	1 / 15	63
2006–07	4	Dunaföldvár	5 / 16	53
2007–08	4	Dunaföldvár FC	2 / 16	62
2008–09	4	Dunaföldvár FC	5 / 16	59
2009–10	4	Dunaföldvár FC	6 / 16	51
2010–11	4	Dunaföldvár FC	2 / 7	38
2010–11	4	Dunaföldvár FC	7 / 13	28
2011–12	4	Dunaföldvár FC	9 / 10	22
2012–13	4	Dunaföldvár FC	12 / 14	23
2013–14	4	Dunaföldvár FC	10 / 15	29
2014–15	4	Dunaföldvár FC	6 / 14	38
2015–16	4	Zeusport Dunaföldvár FC	8 / 14	36
2016–17	4	Dunaföldvár FC	9 / 13	32
2017–18	4	Dunaföldvár FC	5 / 13	46
2018–19	4	Dunaföldvári FC	6 / 11	39
2019–20	4	Dunaföldvár FC	10 / 10	8
2020–21	4	Dunaföldvár FC	9 / 9	2
2021–22	4	Dunaföldvár FC	8 / 10	30
2022–23	4	Dunaföldvár FC	1 / 9	54
2023–24	3	Dunaföldvár FC	5 / 16	53
2024–25	3	Dunaföldvár FC	16 / 16	7
2025–26	4	Dunaföldvár FC	7 / 7	12
