= 2022–23 Megyei Bajnokság I =

Megyei Bajnokság I
- Season: 2022–23

The 2022–23 Megyei Bajnokság I includes the championships of 20 counties in Hungary. It is the fourth tier of the Hungarian football league system.

== Bács-Kiskun ==
Kiskunfélegyháza and Bácsalmás were the only team to acquire the NB III license for next season. Bácsalmás was ineligible based on league position and the champion declined the participation before the promotion play-offs for financial reasons.

=== League table ===
Pos	Team	Pld	W	D	L	GF	GA	GD	Pts	Promotion or relegation
1	Kiskunfélegyháza (C)	26	19	3	4	66	21	+45	60	
2	Baja	26	14	7	5	51	34	+17	49	
3	Jánoshalma	26	13	6	7	44	32	+12	45	
4	Bácsalmás	26	12	7	7	44	30	+14	43	
5	Tiszakécske II	26	11	5	10	49	67	−18	38	
6	Harta	26	10	6	10	57	49	+8	36	
7	Soltvadkert	26	8	10	8	43	38	+5	34	
8	Kunbaja	26	9	6	11	41	45	−4	33	
9	Lajosmizse	26	8	8	10	34	43	−9	32	
10	Akasztó	26	8	6	12	34	37	−3	30	
11	Kecskeméti LC	26	7	7	12	31	38	−7	28	
12	Kecel	26	8	3	15	43	62	−19	27	
13	Kalocsa	26	5	10	11	35	46	−11	25	
14	Kiskőrös (R)	26	5	6	15	33	63	−30	21	Relegation to Megyei Bajnokság II

Updated to match(es) played on 27 May 2023. Source: MLSZ.HU
Rules for classification: 1) Points; 2) Matches won; 3) Goal difference; 4) Goals scored; 5) Head-to-head points; 6) Head-to-head goal difference; 7) Fair play ranking; 8) Drawing of lots.
(C) Champions; (R) Relegated

== Baranya ==
Fifteen teams competed in the 2022-23 season. However, Boda withdrew, therefore, finally only 14 teams competed.

=== League table ===
Pos	Team	Pld	W	D	L	GF	GA	GD	Pts	Promotion or relegation
1	Mohács (C, P)	26	24	2	0	94	6	+88	74	Qualification for promotion play-offs
2	Pécsvárad	26	20	2	4	104	31	+73	62	
3	Bóly	26	18	3	5	63	23	+40	57	
4	Pécsi VSK	26	14	4	8	61	25	+36	46	
5	Pécsi EAC II	26	14	3	9	71	40	+31	45	
6	Komlói Bányász	26	14	3	9	72	43	+29	45	
7	Villány	26	13	6	7	63	36	+27	45	
8	Lovászhetény (Note: Lovászhetény was deducted 4 points)	26	11	7	8	66	39	+27	36	
9	Szederkény - Kozármisleny II	26	11	3	12	63	46	+17	36	
10	Siklós	26	6	4	16	35	77	−42	22	
11	Nagykozár	26	4	5	17	48	81	−33	17	
12	Sellye (Note: Sellye was deducted 1 points)	26	5	2	19	47	83	−36	16	
13	Szentlőrinc II	26	5	1	20	42	80	−38	16	
14	Kétújfalú (Note: Kétújfalú was deducted 7 points)	26	0	1	25	15	234	−219	−6	
15	Boda (Note: Boda withdrew from the league, their results was cancelled.) (R)	0	0	0	0	0	0	0	0	Withdrawn

Updated to match(es) played on 27 May 2023. Source: MLSZ.HU
Rules for classification: 1) Points; 2) Matches won; 3) Goal difference; 4) Goals scored; 5) Head-to-head points; 6) Head-to-head goal difference; 7) Fair play ranking; 8) Drawing of lots.
(C) Champions; (P) Promoted; (R) Relegated

== Békés ==
=== League table ===
Pos	Team	Pld	W	D	L	GF	GA	GD	Pts	Promotion or relegation
1	Végegyháza (Note: Végegyháza does not have NB III license.) (C)	24	19	4	1	73	27	+46	61	
2	Orosháza	24	19	2	3	51	20	+31	59	Qualification for promotion play-offs
3	Szarvas	24	17	3	4	72	24	+48	54	
4	Gyula	24	10	5	9	49	39	+10	35	
5	Szeghalom	24	8	1	15	43	69	−26	25	
6	Nagyszénás	24	7	3	14	34	48	−14	24	
7	Gyomaendrőd	24	7	3	14	44	74	−30	24	
8	Medgyesbodzás	24	6	5	13	36	55	−19	23	
9	Jamina	24	1	2	21	24	70	−46	5	
10	Sarkad (Note: Sarkad withdrew due to shortage of players, their results was cancelled.) (R)	0	0	0	0	0	0	0	0	Withdrawn

Updated to match(es) played on 27 May 2023. Source: MLSZ.HU
Rules for classification: 1) Points; 2) Matches won; 3) Goal difference; 4) Goals scored; 5) Head-to-head points; 6) Head-to-head goal difference; 7) Fair play ranking; 8) Drawing of lots.
(C) Champions; (R) Relegated

== Borsod-Abaúj-Zemplén ==
=== League table ===
Pos	Team	Pld	W	D	L	GF	GA	GD	Pts	Promotion or relegation
1	Cigánd (C, P)	28	22	3	3	98	22	+76	69	Qualification for promotion play-offs
2	Ózd-Sajóvölgye	28	15	11	2	67	24	+43	56	
3	Sajóbábony (Note: Sajóbábony was deducted 1 points for their U16 team was short-handed for the third time.)	28	17	3	8	61	45	+16	53	
4	Hidasnémeti (Note: Hidasnémeti was deducted 3 points for their U13 team non-appearance for the third time.)	28	16	6	6	82	42	+40	51	
5	Mezőkövesd II	28	13	7	8	58	41	+17	46	
6	Tállya	28	13	6	9	47	42	+5	45	
7	Bánhorváti - Kazincbarcika II	28	14	1	13	53	54	−1	43	
8	Bőcs	28	13	3	12	60	69	−9	42	
9	Felsőzsolca	28	12	6	10	58	43	+15	42	
10	Miskolc	28	12	4	12	54	64	−10	40	
11	Gesztely	28	11	2	15	53	64	−11	35	
12	Mezőkeresztes	28	8	2	18	36	71	−35	26	
13	Alsózsolca	28	6	6	16	57	66	−9	24	
14	Nyékládháza	28	3	5	20	42	94	−52	14	
15	Tokaj	28	2	1	25	26	111	−85	7	
16	Encs (Note: Encs withdrew from the league, their results was cancelled.) (R)	0	0	0	0	0	0	0	0	Withdrawn

Updated to match(es) played on 27 May 2023. Source: MLSZ.HU
Rules for classification: 1) Points; 2) Matches won; 3) Goal difference; 4) Goals scored; 5) Head-to-head points; 6) Head-to-head goal difference; 7) Fair play ranking; 8) Drawing of lots.
(C) Champions; (P) Promoted; (R) Relegated

== Budapest ==
Unione rejected NB III participation therefore Rákospalota qualified for promotion play-offs where they beat Kállósemjén 10–4 on aggregate.

=== League table ===
Pos	Team	Pld	W	D	L	GF	GA	GD	Pts	Promotion or relegation
1	Unione (C)	30	26	2	2	77	15	+62	80	
2	Rákospalota (P)	30	23	2	5	77	29	+48	71	Qualification for promotion play-offs
3	Csep-Gól	30	21	4	5	85	28	+57	67	
4	Budafok II	30	19	5	6	54	26	+28	62	
5	43. Sz. Építők (Note: 4 points deducted)	30	17	4	9	72	43	+29	51	
6	Csepel	30	12	7	11	48	31	+17	43	
7	Gázgyár (Note: 6 points deducted)	30	14	5	11	41	48	−7	41	
8	Fővárosi Vízművek	30	12	2	16	51	56	−5	38	
9	Pestszentimre	30	10	5	15	34	49	−15	35	
10	Testvériség	30	9	8	13	36	40	−4	35	
11	Szabadkikötő	30	8	7	15	38	58	−20	31	
12	SZAC Budapest	30	7	6	17	35	60	−25	27	
13	Testnevelési Főiskola	30	7	6	17	25	59	−34	27	
14	Issimo	30	5	8	17	36	75	−39	23	
15	Ikarus	30	5	5	20	32	79	−47	20	
16	Rákosmente	30	4	6	20	31	76	−45	18	Relegation to Megyei Bajnokság II

Updated to match(es) played on 27 May 2023. Source: MLSZ.HU
Rules for classification: 1) Points; 2) Matches won; 3) Goal difference; 4) Goals scored; 5) Head-to-head points; 6) Head-to-head goal difference; 7) Fair play ranking; 8) Drawing of lots.
(C) Champions; (P) Promoted

== Csongrád-Csanád ==
=== Regular stage ===
Pos	Team	Pld	W	D	L	GF	GA	GD	Pts	Qualification
1	Szeged II	22	20	2	0	103	9	+94	62	Qualification for promotion group
2	Szegedi VSE	22	16	1	5	100	23	+77	49	Qualification for promotion group
3	Tiszasziget	22	15	2	5	60	25	+35	47	Qualification for promotion group
4	Kiskundorozsma	22	13	3	6	41	34	+7	42	Qualification for promotion group
5	Algyő	22	13	2	7	44	38	+6	41	Qualification for promotion group
6	Mórahalom	22	11	3	8	39	31	+8	36	Qualification for promotion group
7	FK Szeged	22	6	6	10	23	49	−26	24	Qualification for relegation group
8	Hódmezővásárhely II	22	7	1	14	33	57	−24	22	Qualification for relegation group
9	Balástya	22	6	2	14	30	69	−39	20	Qualification for relegation group
10	Deszk	22	4	2	16	36	77	−41	14	Qualification for relegation group
11	Szentes	22	3	4	15	22	63	−41	13	Qualification for relegation group
12	Újszeged	22	4	0	18	24	80	−56	12	Qualification for relegation group

Source: MLSZ.HU
Rules for classification: 1) Points; 2) Matches won; 3) Goal difference; 4) Goals scored; 5) Head-to-head points; 6) Head-to-head goal difference; 7) Fair play ranking; 8) Drawing of lots.

=== Csongrád-Csanád promotion group ===
Pos	Team	Pld	W	D	L	GF	GA	GD	Pts	Promotion
1	Szeged II (C, P)	32	29	3	0	133	13	+120	90	Qualification for promotion play-offs
2	Szegedi VSE	32	22	4	6	118	30	+88	70	
3	Tiszasziget	32	17	5	10	70	42	+28	56	
4	Algyő	32	16	2	14	55	60	−5	50	
5	Mórahalom	32	15	5	12	50	43	+7	50	
6	Kiskundorozsma	32	14	4	14	46	57	−11	46	

Updated to match(es) played on 27 May 2023. Source: MLSZ.HU
Rules for classification: 1) Points; 2) Matches won; 3) Goal difference; 4) Goals scored; 5) Head-to-head points; 6) Head-to-head goal difference; 7) Fair play ranking; 8) Drawing of lots.
(C) Champions; (P) Promoted

=== Csongrád-Csanád relegation group ===
Pos	Team	Pld	W	D	L	GF	GA	GD	Pts	Relegation
1	Hódmezővásárhely II	32	13	2	17	60	76	−16	41	
2	FK Szeged	32	9	10	13	35	62	−27	37	
3	Balástya	32	11	3	18	45	84	−39	36	
4	Szentes	32	8	7	17	43	74	−31	31	
5	Deszk	32	8	4	20	50	89	−39	28	
6	Újszeged (R)	32	4	3	25	29	104	−75	15	Relegation to Megyei Bajnokság II

Updated to match(es) played on 27 May 2023. Source: MLSZ.HU
Rules for classification: 1) Points; 2) Matches won; 3) Goal difference; 4) Goals scored; 5) Head-to-head points; 6) Head-to-head goal difference; 7) Fair play ranking; 8) Drawing of lots.
(R) Relegated

== Fejér ==
=== League table ===
Pos	Team	Pld	W	D	L	GF	GA	GD	Pts	Promotion or relegation
1	Gárdony (C)	28	26	1	1	97	22	+75	79	Qualification for promotion play-offs
2	Főnix	28	21	1	6	76	34	+42	64	
3	Tordas	28	20	2	6	58	26	+32	62	
4	Sárbogárd	28	17	6	5	85	41	+44	57	
5	Kápolnásnyék	28	17	2	9	73	48	+25	53	
6	Ercsi Kinizsi	28	13	4	11	65	56	+9	43	
7	Sárosd	28	12	3	13	52	45	+7	39	
8	Maroshegy	28	11	6	11	46	43	+3	39	
9	Lajoskomárom	28	10	4	14	44	60	−16	34	
10	Enying	28	9	3	16	40	66	−26	30	
11	Csór	28	7	4	17	37	74	−37	25	
12	Bodajk	28	6	7	15	29	55	−26	25	
13	Mány	28	7	2	19	38	65	−27	23	
14	Bicske II	28	5	2	21	37	94	−57	17	
15	Martonvásár (R)	28	2	7	19	31	79	−48	13	Relegation to Megyei Bajnokság II

Updated to match(es) played on 27 May 2023. Source: MLSZ.HU
Rules for classification: 1) Points; 2) Matches won; 3) Goal difference; 4) Goals scored; 5) Head-to-head points; 6) Head-to-head goal difference; 7) Fair play ranking; 8) Drawing of lots.
(C) Champions; (R) Relegated

== Győr-Moson-Sopron ==
Koroncó failed to acquire the NB III license therefore second placed SC Sopron was next in line to contest for promotion. In the draw, they were one of last two teams who were drawn, giving them automatic promotion.

=== League table ===
Pos	Team	Pld	W	D	L	GF	GA	GD	Pts	Promotion or relegation
1	Koroncó (C)	28	24	1	3	92	33	+59	73	
2	SC Sopron (P)	28	19	5	4	95	34	+61	62	Qualification for promotion play-offs
3	Kapuvár	28	18	6	4	100	52	+48	60	
4	Mosonmagyaróvár II	28	17	4	7	64	31	+33	55	
5	Lipót	28	14	10	4	63	38	+25	52	
6	Abda	28	14	6	8	65	44	+21	48	
7	Bácsa	28	12	10	6	65	42	+23	46	
8	Hegykő	28	10	6	12	56	54	+2	36	
9	Soproni FAC	28	9	5	14	57	79	−22	32	
10	Vitnyéd	28	7	9	12	45	61	−16	30	
11	Nádorváros	28	8	5	15	54	74	−20	29	
12	Gönyű	28	7	5	16	36	84	−48	26	
13	Győrújbarát	28	4	4	20	37	87	−50	16	
14	Pannonhalma	28	3	2	23	30	70	−40	11	
15	Ménfőcsanak (Note: Ménfőcsanak was deducted 7 points) (R)	28	3	4	21	33	109	−76	6	Relegation to Megyei Bajnokság II

Updated to match(es) played on 27 May 2023. Source: MLSZ.HU
Rules for classification: 1) Points; 2) Matches won; 3) Goal difference; 4) Goals scored; 5) Head-to-head points; 6) Head-to-head goal difference; 7) Fair play ranking; 8) Drawing of lots.
(C) Champions; (P) Promoted; (R) Relegated

== Hajdú-Bihar ==
=== League table ===
Pos	Team	Pld	W	D	L	GF	GA	GD	Pts	Promotion or relegation
1	Monostorpályi (C)	30	23	3	4	81	29	+52	72	Qualification for promotion play-offs
2	Nyíradony	30	21	4	5	65	22	+43	67	
3	Hajdúnánás	30	19	8	3	87	26	+61	65	
4	Hajdúböszörmény	30	19	4	7	85	39	+46	61	
5	Berettyóújfalu	30	16	6	8	64	32	+32	54	
6	Hajdúsámson	30	15	4	11	73	59	+14	49	
7	Debreceni ASE	30	14	6	10	63	42	+21	48	
8	Balmazújváros	30	13	4	13	80	56	+24	43	
9	Sárrétudvar	30	11	7	12	50	46	+4	40	
10	BeStrong	30	11	6	13	73	74	−1	39	
11	Kaba	30	11	5	14	61	58	+3	38	
12	Debreceni EAC II	30	9	4	17	42	51	−9	31	
13	Létavértes	30	9	4	17	62	101	−39	31	
14	Püspökladány	30	6	5	19	44	86	−42	23	
15	Józsa	30	5	4	21	65	103	−38	19	
16	Debreceni SI (R)	30	1	0	29	13	184	−171	3	Relegation to Megyei Bajnokság II

Updated to match(es) played on 27 May 2023. Source: MLSZ.HU
Rules for classification: 1) Points; 2) Matches won; 3) Goal difference; 4) Goals scored; 5) Head-to-head points; 6) Head-to-head goal difference; 7) Fair play ranking; 8) Drawing of lots.
(C) Champions; (R) Relegated

== Heves ==
=== League table ===
Pos	Team	Pld	W	D	L	GF	GA	GD	Pts	Promotion or relegation
1	Gyöngyös (C, P)	24	20	3	1	87	13	+74	63	Qualification for promotion play-offs
2	Füzesabony	24	20	2	2	72	22	+50	62	
3	Lőrinci	24	14	4	6	50	18	+32	46	
4	Egerszalók	24	11	7	6	48	32	+16	40	
5	Gyöngyöshalász	24	10	5	9	44	28	+16	35	
6	Heréd	24	9	6	9	47	40	+7	33	
7	Andornaktálya	24	10	2	12	52	47	+5	32	
8	Maklár	24	8	6	10	41	48	−7	30	
9	Eger II (Note: Eger II was deducted 1 points due to an unauthorized player played against Heréd.)	24	7	7	10	47	68	−21	27	
10	Heves	24	7	4	13	36	44	−8	25	
11	Bélapát	24	7	4	13	42	65	−23	25	
12	Energia	24	6	4	14	50	62	−12	22	
13	Besenyőtelek (R)	24	0	0	24	11	140	−129	0	Relegation to Megyei Bajnokság II

Updated to match(es) played on 27 May 2023. Source: MLSZ.HU
Rules for classification: 1) Points; 2) Matches won; 3) Goal difference; 4) Goals scored; 5) Head-to-head points; 6) Head-to-head goal difference; 7) Fair play ranking; 8) Drawing of lots.
(C) Champions; (P) Promoted; (R) Relegated

== Jász-Nagykun-Szolnok ==
=== League table ===
Pos	Team	Pld	W	D	L	GF	GA	GD	Pts	Promotion or relegation
1	Martfű (C, P)	28	26	1	1	121	20	+101	79	Qualification for promotion play-offs
2	Tiszaföldvár	28	23	2	3	98	25	+73	71	
3	Törökszentmiklós	28	17	3	8	68	27	+41	54	
4	Kisújszállás	28	15	6	7	61	45	+16	51	
5	Mezőtúr	28	13	8	7	60	42	+18	47	
6	Jászfényszaru	28	13	7	8	52	39	+13	46	
7	Tószeg	28	12	2	14	45	59	−14	38	
8	Rákóczifalva	28	11	5	12	46	59	−13	38	
9	Kunszentmártoni TE	28	11	4	13	49	66	−17	37	
10	Jánoshida	28	10	6	12	63	62	+1	36	
11	Szajol	28	8	4	16	49	82	−33	28	
12	Cserkeszőlő	28	6	6	16	35	79	−44	24	
13	Kenderes	28	6	2	20	42	84	−42	20	
14	Kunhegyes	28	6	2	20	34	82	−48	20	
15	Jászárokszállás	28	3	2	23	26	78	−52	11	
16	Jászberény II (Note: Jászberény II withdrew from the league, their results was cancelled.)	0	0	0	0	0	0	0	0	Withdrawn

Updated to match(es) played on 27 May 2023. Source: MLSZ.HU
Rules for classification: 1) Points; 2) Matches won; 3) Goal difference; 4) Goals scored; 5) Head-to-head points; 6) Head-to-head goal difference; 7) Fair play ranking; 8) Drawing of lots.
(C) Champions; (P) Promoted

== Komárom-Esztergom ==
=== Regular stage ===
Pos	Team	Pld	W	D	L	GF	GA	GD	Pts	Qualification
1	Nyergesújfalu	22	17	2	3	67	24	+43	53	Qualification for promotion group
2	Koppánymonostor	22	14	7	1	72	14	+58	49	Qualification for promotion group
3	Vértessomló	22	13	3	6	56	31	+25	42	Qualification for promotion group
4	Tata	22	13	2	7	65	31	+34	41	Qualification for promotion group
5	Bábolna	22	11	5	6	35	26	+9	38	Qualification for promotion group
6	Tát	22	10	0	12	40	48	−8	30	Qualification for promotion group
7	Esztergom	22	8	5	9	39	50	−11	29	Qualification for relegation group
8	Almásfüzitő	22	7	4	11	31	53	−22	25	Qualification for relegation group
9	Kecskéd	22	7	3	12	36	50	−14	24	Qualification for relegation group
10	Sárisáp	22	5	5	12	34	47	−13	20	Qualification for relegation group
11	Vértesszőlős	22	4	4	14	34	75	−41	16	Qualification for relegation group
12	Környe	22	2	2	18	26	86	−60	8	Qualification for relegation group

Source: MLSZ.HU
Rules for classification: 1) Points; 2) Matches won; 3) Goal difference; 4) Goals scored; 5) Head-to-head points; 6) Head-to-head goal difference; 7) Fair play ranking; 8) Drawing of lots.

=== Komárom-Esztergom promotion group ===
Pos	Team	Pld	W	D	L	GF	GA	GD	Pts	Promotion
1	Nyergesújfalu (C)	27	21	3	3	82	31	+51	66	Qualification for promotion play-offs
2	Koppánymonostor	27	17	8	2	88	20	+68	59	
3	Tata	27	16	3	8	80	45	+35	51	
4	Vértessomló	27	14	5	8	62	37	+25	47	
5	Bábolna	27	12	6	9	46	38	+8	42	
6	Tát	27	10	0	17	44	70	−26	30	

Updated to match(es) played on 27 May 2023. Source: MLSZ.HU
Rules for classification: 1) Points; 2) Matches won; 3) Goal difference; 4) Goals scored; 5) Head-to-head points; 6) Head-to-head goal difference; 7) Fair play ranking; 8) Drawing of lots.
(C) Champions

=== Komárom-Esztergom relegation group ===
Pos	Team	Pld	W	D	L	GF	GA	GD	Pts	Relegation
1	Esztergom	27	11	5	11	48	57	−9	38	
2	Kecskéd	27	11	4	12	56	53	+3	37	
3	Almásfüzitő	27	9	4	14	42	67	−25	31	
4	Sárisáp (Note: Sárisáp was deducted 3 points)	27	9	6	12	51	52	−1	30	
5	Vértesszőlős	27	4	4	19	40	100	−60	16	
6	Környe (R)	27	3	2	22	34	103	−69	11	Relegation to Megyei Bajnokság II

Updated to match(es) played on 27 May 2023. Source: MLSZ.HU
Rules for classification: 1) Points; 2) Matches won; 3) Goal difference; 4) Goals scored; 5) Head-to-head points; 6) Head-to-head goal difference; 7) Fair play ranking; 8) Drawing of lots.
(R) Relegated

== Nógrád ==
=== League table ===
Pos	Team	Pld	W	D	L	GF	GA	GD	Pts	Promotion or relegation
1	Salgótarján (C, P)	28	25	2	1	124	16	+108	77	Qualification for promotion play-offs
2	Mohora	28	24	0	4	75	24	+51	72	
3	Karancslapujtő (Note: Karancslapujtő was deducted 4 points due to one substitute played with an expired medical certificate.)	28	23	3	2	112	21	+91	68	
4	Mátraterenye (Note: Mátraterenye was deducted 3 points for their U13 team non-appearance for the third time.)	28	19	3	6	76	38	+38	57	
5	Szendehely	28	13	2	13	63	53	+10	41	
6	Pásztó	28	11	5	12	71	65	+6	38	
7	Palotás	28	9	7	12	39	52	−13	34	
8	Berkenye	28	9	4	15	51	68	−17	31	
9	Diósjenő	28	9	4	15	46	65	−19	31	
10	Forgách	28	9	4	15	56	84	−28	31	
11	Szécsény	28	9	3	16	39	72	−33	30	
12	Bánk-Dalnoki Akadémia II	28	7	3	18	40	57	−17	24	
13	Érsekvadkert	28	7	1	20	47	121	−74	22	
14	Héhalom	28	6	4	18	36	90	−54	22	
15	Bátonyterenye (R)	28	5	5	18	32	81	−49	20	Relegation to Megyei Bajnokság II

Updated to match(es) played on 27 May 2023. Source: MLSZ.HU
Rules for classification: 1) Points; 2) Matches won; 3) Goal difference; 4) Goals scored; 5) Head-to-head points; 6) Head-to-head goal difference; 7) Fair play ranking; 8) Drawing of lots.
(C) Champions; (P) Promoted; (R) Relegated

== Pest ==
Vecsés rejected NB III participation therefore Dunaharaszti will fight for promotion.

=== League table ===
Pos	Team	Pld	W	D	L	GF	GA	GD	Pts	Promotion or relegation
1	Vecsés (C)	28	22	3	3	87	27	+60	69	
2	Dunaharaszti	28	18	6	4	65	31	+34	60	Qualification for promotion play-offs
3	Gödöllő	28	18	5	5	69	23	+46	59	
4	Dunakeszi	28	14	5	9	55	45	+10	47	
5	Pilis	28	13	6	9	40	31	+9	45	
6	Dunavarsány	28	13	5	10	55	51	+4	44	
7	Veresegyház	28	12	7	9	39	39	0	43	
8	Biatorbágy	28	12	3	13	51	53	−2	39	
9	Nagykáta	28	11	2	15	52	64	−12	35	
10	Vác	28	10	4	14	43	54	−11	34	
11	Tököl	28	8	5	15	44	62	−18	29	
12	Budakalász	28	8	4	16	35	61	−26	28	
13	Bugyi	28	6	8	14	29	42	−13	26	
14	Felsőpakony	28	6	2	20	24	64	−40	20	
15	Gyömrő	28	6	1	21	38	79	−41	19	
16	Pereg (R)	0	0	0	0	0	0	0	0	Withdrawn

Updated to match(es) played on 27 May 2023. Source: MLSZ.HU
Rules for classification: 1) Points; 2) Matches won; 3) Goal difference; 4) Goals scored; 5) Head-to-head points; 6) Head-to-head goal difference; 7) Fair play ranking; 8) Drawing of lots.
(C) Champions; (R) Relegated

== Somogy ==
Nagyatád declined the participation in NB III and the second and third position, Nagybajom and Marcali failed to acquire the license.

=== League table ===
Pos	Team	Pld	W	D	L	GF	GA	GD	Pts	Promotion or relegation
1	Nagyatád (C)	28	23	4	1	89	18	+71	73	
2	Nagybajom	28	19	4	5	81	26	+55	61	
3	Marcali	28	19	4	5	97	53	+44	61	
4	Kaposfüred	28	16	3	9	47	43	+4	51	
5	Kadarkút (Note: Kadarkút was deducted 1 points)	28	15	7	6	61	33	+28	51	
6	Balatonlelle	28	13	7	8	64	31	+33	46	
7	Balatoni Vasas	28	11	7	10	43	45	−2	40	
8	Toponár (Note: Toponár was deducted 1 points)	27	11	7	9	60	56	+4	39	
9	Somogysárd	28	9	7	12	50	66	−16	34	
10	Tab	28	9	3	16	55	67	−12	30	
11	Balatonkeresztúr	28	8	6	14	53	81	−28	30	
12	Csurgó	28	7	5	16	30	44	−14	26	
13	Juta	27	7	4	16	38	60	−22	25	
14	Öreglak	28	3	6	19	40	99	−59	15	
15	Segesd (R)	28	1	2	25	20	106	−86	5	Relegation to Megyei Bajnokság II

Updated to match(es) played on 27 May 2023. Source: MLSZ.HU
Rules for classification: 1) Points; 2) Matches won; 3) Goal difference; 4) Goals scored; 5) Head-to-head points; 6) Head-to-head goal difference; 7) Fair play ranking; 8) Drawing of lots.
(C) Champions; (R) Relegated

== Szabolcs-Szatmár-Bereg ==
=== League table ===
Pos	Team	Pld	W	D	L	GF	GA	GD	Pts	Promotion or relegation
1	Kállósemjén (C)	28	20	5	3	73	20	+53	65	Qualification for promotion play-offs
2	Újfehértó	28	19	6	3	62	12	+50	63	
3	Nyíregyháza II	28	15	5	8	54	28	+26	50	
4	Mátészalka	28	15	4	9	44	29	+15	49	
5	Tarpa	28	14	7	7	55	25	+30	49	
6	Kemecse	28	13	3	12	55	57	−2	42	
7	Nyírbéltek	28	12	2	14	36	46	−10	38	
8	Nagyecsed	28	9	8	11	32	39	−7	35	
9	Mándok	28	9	6	13	36	47	−11	33	
10	Nyírbátor	28	9	6	13	46	65	−19	33	
11	Csenger	28	9	5	14	49	66	−17	32	
12	Vásárosnamény	28	8	5	15	39	57	−18	29	
13	Ibrány	28	7	7	14	36	51	−15	28	
14	Balkány	28	7	3	18	30	68	−38	24	
15	Nyírmeggyes	28	6	4	18	39	76	−37	22	
16	Nagyhalász (Note: Nagyhalász withdrew from the league, due to the 2021–2023 global energy crisis.) (R)	0	0	0	0	0	0	0	0	Withdrawn

Updated to match(es) played on 27 May 2023. Source: MLSZ.HU
Rules for classification: 1) Points; 2) Matches won; 3) Goal difference; 4) Goals scored; 5) Head-to-head points; 6) Head-to-head goal difference; 7) Fair play ranking; 8) Drawing of lots.
(C) Champions; (R) Relegated

== Tolna ==
=== League table ===
Pos	Team	Pld	W	D	L	GF	GA	GD	Pts	Promotion or relegation
1	Dunaföldvár (C, P)	21	17	3	1	75	22	+53	54	Qualification for promotion play-offs
2	Bonyhád	21	15	4	2	69	18	+51	49	
3	Bátaszék	21	11	2	8	46	44	+2	35	
4	Dombóvár	21	10	2	9	53	27	+26	32	
5	Bölcske	21	9	5	7	56	34	+22	32	
6	Kakasd	21	6	2	13	43	68	−25	20	
7	Tevel	21	5	2	14	37	69	−32	17	
8	Tamási	21	0	2	19	15	112	−97	2	
9	Szekszárd II (Note: Szekszárd II withdrew from the league, their results was cancelled.)	0	0	0	0	0	0	0	0	Withdrawn

Updated to match(es) played on 27 May 2023. Source: MLSZ.HU
Rules for classification: 1) Points; 2) Matches won; 3) Goal difference; 4) Goals scored; 5) Head-to-head points; 6) Head-to-head goal difference; 7) Fair play ranking; 8) Drawing of lots.
(C) Champions; (P) Promoted

== Vas ==
=== League table ===
Pos	Team	Pld	W	D	L	GF	GA	GD	Pts	Promotion or relegation
1	Haladás VSE (C, P)	30	27	1	2	124	16	+108	82	Qualification for promotion play-offs
2	Király	30	27	1	2	123	16	+107	82	
3	Répcelak	30	19	4	7	51	26	+25	61	
4	Celldömölk	30	18	4	8	81	42	+39	58	
5	Vép	30	18	3	9	76	40	+36	57	
6	Rábapaty	30	16	6	8	67	42	+25	54	
7	Vasvár	30	16	2	12	66	53	+13	50	
8	Sárvár	30	12	3	15	67	69	−2	39	
9	Körmend	30	10	4	16	41	50	−9	34	
10	Szentgotthárd	30	10	4	16	33	51	−18	34	
11	Szarvaskend	30	10	3	17	46	67	−21	33	
12	Táplán	30	10	2	18	46	79	−33	32	
13	Csepreg	30	8	6	16	35	59	−24	30	
14	Jánosháza	30	6	5	19	34	87	−53	23	
15	Söpte	30	6	3	21	39	86	−47	21	
16	Bük (R)	30	1	1	28	20	166	−146	4	Relegation to Megyei Bajnokság II

Updated to match(es) played on 27 May 2023. Source: MLSZ.HU
Rules for classification: 1) Points; 2) Matches won; 3) Goal difference; 4) Goals scored; 5) Head-to-head points; 6) Head-to-head goal difference; 7) Fair play ranking; 8) Drawing of lots.
(C) Champions; (P) Promoted; (R) Relegated

== Veszprém ==
Úrkút failed to acquire the license of NB III therefore second placed Pápa will fight for promotion.

=== League table ===
Pos	Team	Pld	W	D	L	GF	GA	GD	Pts	Promotion or relegation
1	Úrkút (C)	28	25	1	2	118	18	+100	76	
2	Pápa	28	20	3	5	77	31	+46	63	Qualification for promotion play-offs
3	Tihany	28	18	4	6	87	34	+53	58	
4	Balatonfüredi USC	28	16	5	7	66	36	+30	53	
5	Sümeg	28	12	8	8	68	53	+15	44	
6	Balatonalmádi	28	13	4	11	54	46	+8	43	
7	Pét	28	12	4	12	56	54	+2	40	
8	Ajka SE	28	12	3	13	47	45	+2	39	
9	Szentantalfa	28	12	3	13	54	60	−6	39	
10	Zirc	28	12	2	14	40	56	−16	38	
11	Várpalota	28	10	4	14	53	59	−6	34	
12	Devecser	28	9	6	13	50	75	−25	33	
13	Fűzfő	28	5	4	19	40	102	−62	19	
14	Gyulafirátót	28	5	3	20	30	75	−45	18	
15	Magyarpolány	28	1	2	25	30	126	−96	5	
16	Tiac (Note: Tiac withdrew due to shortage of personnel, their results was cancelled.) (R)	0	0	0	0	0	0	0	0	Withdrawn

Updated to match(es) played on 27 May 2023. Source: MLSZ.HU
Rules for classification: 1) Points; 2) Matches won; 3) Goal difference; 4) Goals scored; 5) Head-to-head points; 6) Head-to-head goal difference; 7) Fair play ranking; 8) Drawing of lots.
(C) Champions; (R) Relegated

== Zala ==
=== League table ===
Pos	Team	Pld	W	D	L	GF	GA	GD	Pts	Promotion or relegation
1	Semjénháza (C)	24	21	2	1	57	12	+45	65	Qualification for promotion play-offs
2	Csesztreg	24	20	2	2	76	24	+52	62	
3	Zalaszentgrót	24	18	2	4	73	15	+58	56	
4	Szepetnek	24	12	3	9	35	24	+11	39	
5	Zalalövő	24	10	3	11	39	35	+4	33	
6	Gyenesdiás	24	10	1	13	41	74	−33	31	
7	Zalakomár	24	8	5	11	31	44	−13	29	
8	Andráshida SC	24	8	4	12	34	33	+1	28	
9	Hévíz	24	5	8	11	19	36	−17	23	
10	Lenti	24	6	4	14	33	64	−31	22	
11	Police-Ola	24	5	5	14	37	55	−18	20	
12	Kiskanizsa	24	5	5	14	29	57	−28	20	
13	Andráshida TE (R)	24	4	4	16	26	57	−31	16	Relegation to Megyei Bajnokság II

Updated to match(es) played on 27 May 2023. Source: MLSZ.HU
Rules for classification: 1) Points; 2) Matches won; 3) Goal difference; 4) Goals scored; 5) Head-to-head points; 6) Head-to-head goal difference; 7) Fair play ranking; 8) Drawing of lots.
(C) Champions; (R) Relegated

== Promotion play-offs ==
The draw was held on 30 May 2023, 11:00 CEST, in the HFF headquarters in Budapest. The first legs were played on 4 June, and the second legs were played on 11 June.

The second half of the match between Semjénháza and Dunaföldvár started 22 minutes late due to heavy rain at Semjénháza, and carried on a waterlogged pitch.

Promoted teams

- Martfű (Jász-Nagykun-Szolnok)
- SC Sopron (Győr-Moson-Sopron)

=== Overview ===
Team 1	Agg.	Team 2	1st leg	2nd leg
Orosháza	1–3	Haladás VSE	1–2	0–1
Pápa	0–4	Gyöngyös	0–1	0–3
Rákospalota	10–4	Kállósemjén	8–3	2–1
Semjénháza	2–10	Dunaföldvár	1–4	1–6
Szeged II	7–3	Gárdony	5–1	2–2
Mohács	2–0	Dunaharaszti	2–0	0–0
Salgótarján	5–0	Nyergesújfalu	3–0	2–0
Monostorpályi	2–3	Cigánd	2–1	0–2

=== Matches ===
All times Central European Summer Time (UTC+2)

4 June 2023
17:30

Orosháza	1–2	Haladás VSE
Bence Fehér 73'	Report	Zoltán Ferencz 32'; Márton Tóth 83'

Mátrai Sándor Stadion, Orosháza
Attendance: 1,000
Referee: Róbert Nagy
11 June 2023
17:00

Haladás VSE	1–0	Orosháza
Márton Pap 24' (pen.)	Report

Haladás Sporttelep, Szombathely
Attendance: 1,700
Referee: Imre Kovács

Haladás VSE won 3–1 on aggregate.

4 June 2023
17:00

Pápa	0–1	Gyöngyös
	Report	Marcell Márkus 44' (pen.)

Perutz Stadion, Pápa
Attendance: 400
Referee: Ákos Gaál
11 June 2023
17:00

Gyöngyös	3–0	Pápa
Botond Oravecz 38'; Norbert Szilágyi 61'; Marcell Márkus 78'	Report

Kömlei Károly Városi Sporttelep, Gyöngyös
Attendance: 1,000
Referee: Bence Hanyecz

Gyöngyös won 4–0 on aggregate.

4 June 2023
17:30

Rákospalota	8–3	Kállósemjén
Zoltán Lakatos 7', 11'; Pandelis Popgeorgiev 13'; Patrik Kaszala 29', 64', 67'; Kálmán Horváth 60'; Márk Tóth 90+2'	Report	Antal Gömze 50'; Tamás Hamza 54', 87' (pen.)

Budai II. László Stadion, Budapest
Attendance: 2,000
Referee: Tibor Horváth
11 June 2023
17:00

Kállósemjén	1–2	Rákospalota
Antal Gömze 71'	Report	Pandelis Popgeorgiev 2', 11'

Kállósemjén Sportpálya, Kállósemjén
Attendance: 812
Referee: Sándor Szilágyi

Rákospalota won 10–4 on aggregate.

4 June 2023
17:30

Semjénháza	1–4	Dunaföldvár
Zoltán Kapuvári 86'	Report	Dávid Gellén 40', 64'; Zoltán Puskás 42'; Roland Szedmák 44'

Semjénháza Sporttelep, Semjénháza
Attendance: 600
Referee: Árpád Jakab
11 June 2023
17:00

Dunaföldvár	6–1	Semjénháza
Dávid Gellén 3', 62', 66'; László Kun 29'; Dániel Rabi 79'; Dániel Havasi 82'	Report	Mátyás Pápai 17'

Dunaföldvár Sporttelep, Dunaföldvár
Attendance: 200
Referee: Péter Zierkelbach

Dunaföldvár won 10–2 on aggregate.

4 June 2023
17:30

Szeged II	5–1	Gárdony
Viktor Dobronoky 9', 79'; Áron Papp 16'; Zsolt Povázsai 30'; Péter Tóth 69'	Report	Zoltán Gere 37'

Szent Gellért Fórum, Szeged
Attendance: 300
Referee: Tamás Berényi
11 June 2023
17:00

Gárdony	2–2	Szeged II
Sándor Szellák 85'; Tibor Tóth 87'	Report	Lionel Lestyán 69'; Amir Kapic 71'

Agári Parkerdő Sport és Szabadidő Központ, Gárdony
Attendance: 200
Referee: Bálint Juhász

Szeged II won 7–3 on aggregate.

4 June 2023
17:30

Mohács	2–0	Dunaharaszti
Máté Izsák 7'; Bence Vég 70'	Report

Újvárosi Stadion, Mohács
Referee: Gergely Bana
11 June 2023
17:00

Dunaharaszti	0–0	Mohács
	Report

DMTK Sporttelep, Dunaharaszti
Referee: Márió Zimmermann

Mohács won 2–0 on aggregate.

4 June 2023
17:00

Salgótarján	3–0	Nyergesújfalu
Patrik Tarlósi 18'; Benedek Csáki 77'; Attila Boros 88'	Report

Szojka Ferenc Stadion, Salgótarján
Attendance: 650
Referee: Zoltán J. Kovács
11 June 2023
17:00

Nyergesújfalu	0–2	Salgótarján
	Report	István Csifó 48'; Benedek Csáki 78'

Hajnal Tamás Sportcentrum, Nyergesújfalu
Referee: Gergő Muhari

Salgótarján won 5–0 on aggregate.

4 June 2023
17:30

Monostorpályi	2–1	Cigánd
Máté Ménes 18'; Péter Bíró 80'	Report	Márton Fabu 12'

Vágó András Sportpálya, Monostorpályi
Attendance: 1,000
Referee: Márk Szigetvári
11 June 2023
17:00

Cigánd	2–0	Monostorpályi
Benjámin Erdős 18' (o.g.); Dávid Nagy 55'	Report

Városi Stadion, Cigánd
Attendance: 1,500
Referee: Tamás Takács

Cigánd won 3–2 on aggregate.

== See also ==
- 2022–23 Nemzeti Bajnokság I
- 2022–23 Nemzeti Bajnokság II
- 2022–23 Nemzeti Bajnokság III
- 2022–23 Magyar Kupa
