= Gárdonyi VSC =

Hungarian football club

- Full name: Gárdonyi Városi Sport Club
- Founded: 1997; 28 years ago
- Ground: Agárdi Parkerdő Sport és Szabadidő Központ
- League: NB III; Southwest
- 2023–24: NB III; Southwest, 11th of 16
- Website: https://gardonyivsc.hu/
Home colours

Gárdonyi Városi Sport Club is a professional football club based in Gárdony, Hungary, that competes in the Nemzeti Bajnokság III – Southwest, the third tier of Hungarian football.

== Honours ==
=== County Leagues (Székesfehérvár járás / Fejér) ===
- Megyei Bajnokság I (level 4)
  - Winners (2): 2019–20, 2022–23
- Megyei Bajnokság III (level 6)
  - Winners (2): 1969, 2009–10

== Season results ==
As of 15 August 2021

Domestic												International		Manager	Ref.
Nemzeti Bajnokság											Magyar Kupa	International		Manager	Ref.
Div.	No.	Season	MP	W	D	L	GF–GA	Dif.	Pts.	Pos.	Magyar Kupa	Competition	Result	Manager	Ref.
III	?.	2021–22	0	0	0	0	0–0	+0	0	TBD	TBD	Did not qualify			
