= Mohácsi TE =

Hungarian football club

- Full name: Mohácsi Torna Egylet
- Founded: 1888; 138 years ago
- Ground: Újvárosi Stadion
- League: NB III
- 2022–23: MB I, Baranya, 1st of 15 (promoted via play-offs)
Home colours

Mohácsi Torna Egylet is a professional football club based in Mohács, Baranya, Hungary, that competes in the Megyei Bajnokság I, the fourth tier of Hungarian football.

== Honours ==
Mohács won the 2020–21 Baranya Megyei Bajnokság I season. Therefore, they were eligible for playing in the 2021–22 Nemzeti Bajnokság III season.

== Season results ==
As of 15 August 2021

Domestic												International		Manager	Ref.
Nemzeti Bajnokság											Magyar Kupa	International		Manager	Ref.
Div.	No.	Season	MP	W	D	L	GF–GA	Dif.	Pts.	Pos.	Magyar Kupa	Competition	Result	Manager	Ref.
III	?.	2021–22	0	0	0	0	0–0	+0	0	TBD	TBD	Did not qualify			
