= Király SZE =

Hungarian football club

- Full name: Király Szabadidősport Egyesület
- Founded: 2006; 19 years ago
- Ground: Király Sportlétesítmény
Home colours	Away colours

Király Szabadidősport Egyesület is a professional football club based in Szombathely, Vas County, Hungary. The club competes in the Vas county league.

== History ==
The club was founded by former Hungarian international footballer Gábor Király.
