= 2017–18 Mezőkövesdi SE season =

Mezőkövesdi SE
2017–18 season
- Chairman: András Tállai
- Manager: Attila Kuttor
Home colours	Away colours

The 2017–18 season was Mezőkövesdi SE's 3rd competitive season, 2nd consecutive season in the OTP Bank Liga and 42nd year in existence as a football club.

== First team squad ==
Note: Flags indicate national team as defined under FIFA eligibility rules; some limited exceptions apply. Players may hold more than one non-FIFA nationality.

No.	Pos.	Nation	Player
1	GK	HUN	Dávid Dombó
2	DF	SRB	Dániel Farkas
3	DF	HUN	Dominik Fótyik
4	MF	CRO	Frano Mlinar
6	DF	HUN	Gergő Gohér
7	MF	HUN	Bence Tóth
8	FW	HUN	Roland Baracskai
9	FW	HUN	Csanád Novák
10	MF	HUN	Bence Iszlai
11	MF	HUN	István Bognár
13	DF	HUN	Pál Lázár
15	MF	CZE	Marek Strestik (captain)

No.	Pos.	Nation	Player
17	DF	SVK	Róbert Pillár
19	FW	HUN	Márk Koszta
23	MF	SEN	Paul Keita
24	FW	HUN	Tamás Cseri
25	DF	HUN	Dániel Vadnai
31	GK	HUN	Tamás Horváth
32	DF	CRO	Matija Katanec
38	FW	SVK	Tomáš Majtán
39	DF	SVK	Dávid Hudák
41	DF	HUN	Attila Szalai
88	DF	HUN	Tamás Szeles

== Transfers ==
=== Summer ===
In: Note: Flags indicate national team as defined under FIFA eligibility rules; some limited exceptions apply. Players may hold more than one non-FIFA nationality.

No.	Pos.	Nation	Player
4	MF	CRO	Frano Mlinar (from (Switzerland) Wil)
9	FW	HUN	Csanád Novák (from Vasas)
10	MF	HUN	Bence Iszlai (from Szombathely)
13	DF	HUN	Pál Lázár (from Diósgyőr)
17	DF	SVK	Róbert Pillár (from (Slovakia) Senica)
19	FW	HUN	Márk Koszta (from Budapest Honvéd)
21	MF	SVK	Jakub Brašeň (from (Slovakia) Dunajská Streda)
22	GK	SVK	Martin Krnáč (from (Slovakia) Slovan Bratislava)
23	MF	SEN	Paul Keita (from (Greece) Kerkyra)
24	FW	HUN	Tamás Cseri (from Kisvárda)
25	DF	HUN	Dániel Vadnai (from MTK Budapest)
29	FW	HUN	Márk Murai (from (Germany) Sprockhövel)
38	FW	SVK	Tomáš Majtán (from (Italy) Racing Roma)
41	DF	HUN	Attila Szalai (from (Austria) Rapid Wien)
80	MF	SVK	Máté Köböl (from Salgótarján)

Out: Note: Flags indicate national team as defined under FIFA eligibility rules; some limited exceptions apply. Players may hold more than one non-FIFA nationality.

No.	Pos.	Nation	Player
4	DF	HUN	Béla Balogh (to MTK Budapest)
9	FW	MLI	Ulysse Diallo (to Puskás Akadémia)
9	MF	HUN	Norbert Heffler (to Kisvárda)
10	MF	CRO	Marko Dinjar (to Szeged)
10	FW	HUN	Roland Frőhlich (to Ferencváros)
17	MF	HUN	Tamás Egerszegi (to (Poland) Miedź Legnica)
19	FW	EST	Tarmo Kink (to (Estonia) Levadia)
21	DF	MKD	Aleksandar Damčevski (to (Cyprus) Ermis)
24	MF	HUN	Dávid Hegedűs (to Kazincbarcika)
33	FW	HUN	Gábor Molnár (to Puskás Akadémia)
50	GK	HUN	Márton Czuczi (to Pénzügyőr)
66	DF	HUN	Alex Engel (to Kazincbarcika)

=== Winter ===
In: Note: Flags indicate national team as defined under FIFA eligibility rules; some limited exceptions apply. Players may hold more than one non-FIFA nationality.

No.	Pos.	Nation	Player
5	MF	HUN	Bálint Oláh (from Diósgyőr)
11	MF	HUN	István Bognár (from Ferencváros)
21	FW	SRB	Stefan Dražić (from (Belgium) Mechelen)
23	FW	CMR	Fabrice Onana (from (Tunisia) Hammam-Lif)
27	MF	SVK	Patrik Mišák (from (Poland) Termalica Nieciecza)
31	GK	HUN	Tamás Horváth (goalkeeper) (from Videoton)
32	DF	CRO	Matija Katanec (from (Bosnia and Herzegovina) Zrinjski Mostar)
—	GK	HUN	Pál Tarczy (from Mosonmagyaróvár)

Out: Note: Flags indicate national team as defined under FIFA eligibility rules; some limited exceptions apply. Players may hold more than one non-FIFA nationality.

No.	Pos.	Nation	Player
14	FW	SRB	Lazar Veselinović (to (Serbia) Rad)
15	MF	CZE	Marek Střeštík (to Kisvárda)
16	MF	HUN	István Csirmaz (loan to Szolnok)
21	MF	SVK	Jakub Brašeň (to (Slovakia) Senica)
22	GK	SVK	Martin Krnáč (to (Czech Republic) Karviná)
23	MF	SEN	Paul Keita (to (Belgium) Beveren)
38	FW	SVK	Tomáš Majtán (to (Slovakia) Skalica)
80	MF	SVK	Máté Köböl (to Veszprém)
90	GK	SVK	Tomáš Tujvel (to Videoton)
99	MF	HUN	Márk Murai (loan to Kazincbarcika)

== Statistics ==
=== Appearances and goals ===
Last updated on 28 April 2018.

No.	Pos	Nat	Player	Total		OTP Bank Liga		Hungarian Cup	
No.	Pos	Nat	Player	Apps	Goals	Apps	Goals	Apps	Goals
1	GK	(Hungary) HUN	Dávid Dombó	15	-20	13	-17	2	-3
2	DF	(Serbia) SRB	Daniel Farkaš	21	1	19	1	2	0
3	DF	(Slovakia) SVK	Dominik Fótyik	7	1	5	1	2	0
4	MF	(Croatia) CRO	Frano Mlinar	19	1	19	1	0	0
5	MF	(Hungary) HUN	Bálint Oláh	1	0	1	0	0	0
6	DF	(Hungary) HUN	Gergő Gohér	4	1	4	1	0	0
7	MF	(Hungary) HUN	Bence Tóth	24	1	22	1	2	0
8	FW	(Hungary) HUN	Roland Baracskai	12	3	11	2	1	1
9	FW	(Hungary) HUN	Csanád Novák	15	2	14	1	1	1
10	MF	(Hungary) HUN	Bence Iszlai	18	1	18	1	0	0
11	MF	(Hungary) HUN	István Bognár	9	1	9	1	0	0
13	DF	(Hungary) HUN	Pál Lázár	17	1	17	1	0	0
17	DF	(Slovakia) SVK	Róbert Pillár	10	1	10	1	0	0
19	FW	(Hungary) HUN	Márk Koszta	28	9	27	9	1	0
21	FW	(Serbia) SRB	Stefan Dražić	6	2	6	2	0	0
24	MF	(Hungary) HUN	Tamás Cseri	29	3	28	3	1	0
26	DF	(Hungary) HUN	Dániel Vadnai	24	0	23	0	1	0
27	MF	(Slovakia) SVK	Patrik Mišák	7	0	7	0	0	0
32	DF	(Croatia) CRO	Matija Katanec	9	0	9	0	0	0
39	DF	(Slovakia) SVK	Dávid Hudák	27	1	26	1	1	0
41	DF	(Hungary) HUN	Attila Szalai	17	0	15	0	2	0
88	DF	(Hungary) HUN	Tamás Szeles	10	0	8	0	2	0
Youth players:
80	MF	(Slovakia) SVK	Máté Köböl	2	0	0	0	2	0
Out to loan:
16	MF	(Hungary) HUN	István Csirmaz	2	0	2	0	0	0
99	MF	(Hungary) HUN	Márk Murai	1	0	0	0	1	0
Players no longer at the club:
14	FW	(Serbia) SRB	Lazar Veselinović	16	1	15	1	1	0
15	MF	(Czech Republic) CZE	Marek Střeštík	18	3	18	3	0	0
21	MF	(Slovakia) SVK	Jakub Brašeň	5	0	3	0	2	0
23	MF	(Senegal) SEN	Paul Keita	16	0	14	0	2	0
38	FW	(Slovakia) SVK	Tomáš Majtán	8	3	6	0	2	3
90	GK	(Slovakia) SVK	Tomáš Tujvel	15	-32	15	-32	0	0

=== Top scorers ===
Includes all competitive matches. The list is sorted by shirt number when total goals are equal.

Last updated on 28 April 2018

Position	Nation	Number	Name	OTP Bank Liga	Hungarian Cup	Total
1	(Hungary)	19	Márk Koszta	9	0	9
2	(Czech Republic)	15	Marek Střeštík	3	0	3
3	(Hungary)	24	Tamás Cseri	3	0	3
4	(Hungary)	8	Roland Baracskai	2	1	3
5	(Slovakia)	38	Tomáš Majtán	0	3	3
6	(Serbia)	21	Stefan Dražić	2	0	2
7	(Hungary)	9	Csanád Novák	1	1	2
8	(Hungary)	6	Gergő Gohér	1	0	1
9	(Slovakia)	39	Dávid Hudák	1	0	1
10	(Serbia)	14	Lazar Veselinović	1	0	1
11	(Slovakia)	18	Róbert Pillár	1	0	1
12	(Hungary)	13	Pál Lázár	1	0	1
13	(Slovakia)	3	Dominik Fótyik	1	0	1
14	(Hungary)	10	Bence Iszlai	1	0	1
15	(Croatia)	4	Frano Mlinar	1	0	1
16	(Hungary)	10	István Bognár	1	0	1
17	(Serbia)	2	Daniel Farkaš	1	0	1
18	(Hungary)	7	Bence Tóth	1	0	1
/	/	/	Own Goals	0	0	0
			TOTALS	31	5	36

=== Disciplinary record ===
Includes all competitive matches. Players with 1 card or more included only.

Last updated on 28 April 2018.

Position	Nation	Number	Name	OTP Bank Liga		Hungarian Cup		Total (Hu Total)	
Position	Nation	Number	Name	Booked	Sent off (straight red)	Booked	Sent off (straight red)	Booked	Sent off (straight red)
DF	(Serbia)	2	Daniel Farkaš	2	0	0	0	2 (2)	0 (0)
DF	(Slovakia)	3	Dominik Fótyik	2	0	0	0	2 (2)	0 (0)
MF	(Croatia)	4	Frano Mlinar	4	0	0	0	4 (4)	0 (0)
DF	(Hungary)	6	Gergő Gohér	1	0	0	0	1 (1)	0 (0)
MF	(Hungary)	7	Bence Tóth	8	1	1	0	9 (8)	1 (1)
FW	(Hungary)	8	Roland Baracskai	3	0	0	0	3 (3)	0 (0)
MF	(Hungary)	10	Bence Iszlai	4	0	0	0	4 (4)	0 (0)
MF	(Hungary)	11	István Bognár	1	0	0	0	1 (1)	0 (0)
DF	(Hungary)	13	Pál Lázár	5	0	0	0	5 (5)	0 (0)
FW	(Serbia)	14	Lazar Veselinović	4	0	0	0	4 (4)	0 (0)
MF	(Czech Republic)	15	Marek Střeštík	2	0	0	0	2 (2)	0 (0)
DF	(Slovakia)	17	Róbert Pillár	1	0	0	0	1 (1)	0 (0)
FW	(Hungary)	19	Márk Koszta	3	0	0	0	3 (3)	0 (0)
FW	(Serbia)	21	Stefan Dražić	1	0	0	0	1 (1)	0 (0)
MF	(Senegal)	23	Paul Keita	6	0	1	0	7 (6)	0 (0)
MF	(Hungary)	24	Tamás Cseri	4	0	0	0	4 (4)	0 (0)
DF	(Hungary)	26	Dániel Vadnai	4	0	0	0	4 (4)	0 (0)
DF	(Croatia)	32	Matija Katanec	1	0	0	0	1 (1)	0 (0)
FW	(Slovakia)	38	Tomáš Majtán	2	0	1	0	3 (2)	0 (0)
DF	(Slovakia)	39	Dávid Hudák	11	0	1	0	12 (11)	0 (0)
DF	(Hungary)	41	Attila Szalai	2	0	0	0	2 (2)	0 (0)
DF	(Hungary)	88	Tamás Szeles	3	1	0	0	3 (3)	1 (1)
GK	(Slovakia)	90	Tomáš Tujvel	2	0	0	0	2 (2)	0 (0)
			TOTALS	76	2	4	0	80 (76)	2 (2)

=== Overall ===
Games played	30 (28 OTP Bank Liga and 2 Hungarian Cup)
Games won	7 (6 OTP Bank Liga and 1 Hungarian Cup)
Games drawn	10 (10 OTP Bank Liga and 0 Hungarian Cup)
Games lost	13 (12 OTP Bank Liga and 1 Hungarian Cup)
Goals scored	36
Goals conceded	52
Goal difference	−16
Yellow cards	80
Red cards	2
Worst discipline	(Slovakia) Dávid Hudák (12 (yellow card) , 0 (red card) )
Best result	4–1 (A) v Kecskemét – Hungarian Cup – 20-09-2017
Worst result	0–5 (A) v Ferencváros – OTP Bank Liga – 30-07-2017
Most appearances	(Hungary) Tamás Cseri (29 appearances)
Top scorer	(Hungary) Márk Koszta (9 goals)
Points	31/90 (34.44%)

Last updated: 28 April 2018

== Nemzeti Bajnokság I ==
=== Matches ===
15 July 2017 1	Debrecen	1–2	Mezőkövesd	Debrecen, Hajdú-Bihar County
18:00 CEST	Ferenczi 76'	Report	Gohér 63'; Hudák 90+3'	Stadium: Nagyerdei Stadion; Attendance: 4,401; Referee: (Hungary) Csaba Pintér

22 July 2017 2	Mezőkövesd	3–2	Paks	Mezőkövesd, Borsod-Abaúj-Zemplén County
18:00 CEST	Veselinović 65'; Baracskai 70'; Střeštík 77' (pen.)	Report	Szakály 57'; Lenzsér 59'	Stadium: Városi Stadion; Attendance: 2,356; Referee: (Hungary) Zsolt Szabó

30 July 2017 3	Ferencváros	5–0	Mezőkövesd	Budapest, Pest County
18:00 CEST	Moutari 9', 26'; Varga 29' (pen.), 53'; Böde 90'	Report		Stadium: Groupama Arena; Attendance: 5,861; Referee: (Hungary) Péter Solymosi

6 August 2017 4	Mezőkövesd	0–2	Videoton	Mezőkövesd, Borsod-Abaúj-Zemplén County
20:00 CEST		Report	Henty 23'; Lazović 85'	Stadium: Városi Stadion; Attendance: 2,300; Referee: (Hungary) Sándor Andó-Szabó

12 August 2017 5	Vasas	1–1	Mezőkövesd	Budapest, Pest County
18:00 CEST	Kulcsár 60'	Report	Pillár 90'	Stadium: Szusza Ferenc Stadion; Attendance: 1,700; Referee: (Hungary) Balázs Berke

19 August 2017 6	Mezőkövesd	1–2	Budapest Honvéd	Mezőkövesd, Borsod-Abaúj-Zemplén County
18:00 CEST	Baracskai 72'	Report	Baráth 22'; Kabangu 90+4'	Stadium: Városi Stadion; Attendance: 3,215; Referee: (Hungary) József Erdős

26 August 2017 7	Diósgyőr	2–1	Mezőkövesd	Debrecen, Hajdú-Bihar County
18:00 CEST	Forgács 73'; Ugrai 90+3' (pen.)	Report	Cseri 57'	Stadium: Nagyerdei Stadion; Attendance: 1,979; Referee: (Hungary) Sándor Andó-Szabó

9 September 2017 8	Mezőkövesd	2–2	Balmazújváros	Mezőkövesd, Borsod-Abaúj-Zemplén County
18:00 CEST	Lázár 58'; Střeštík 70'	Report	Arabuli 35', 88'	Stadium: Városi Stadion; Attendance: 2,544; Referee: (Hungary) Ádám Farkas

16 September 2017 9	Puskás Akadémia	1–0	Mezőkövesd	Felcsút, Fejér County
18:00 CEST	Diallo 57'	Report		Stadium: Pancho Arena; Attendance: 811; Referee: (Hungary) Zoltán Iványi

23 September 2017 10	Mezőkövesd	2–4	Újpest	Mezőkövesd, Borsod-Abaúj-Zemplén County
18:15 CEST	Cseri 28'; Fótyik 84'	Report	Tischler 60'; Novothny 62', 78', 86' (pen.)	Stadium: Városi Stadion; Attendance: 2,386; Referee: (Hungary) Péter Solymosi

30 September 2017 11	Szombathely	2–2	Mezőkövesd	Sopron, Győr-Moson-Sopron County
18:00 CEST	Williams 5'; Polgár 60'	Report	Iszlai 27'; Koszta 82'	Stadium: Káposztás utcai Stadion; Attendance: 1,430; Referee: (Hungary) Zsolt Szabó

14 October 2017 12	Mezőkövesd	0–2	Debrecen	Mezőkövesd, Borsod-Abaúj-Zemplén County
15:30 CEST		Report	Mengolo 28'; Bódi 84'	Stadium: Városi Stadion; Attendance: 1,641; Referee: (Hungary) István Vad

21 October 2017 13	Paks	1–1	Mezőkövesd	Paks, Tolna County
15:30 CEST	Simon 17'	Report	Koszta 29'	Stadium: Fehérvári úti Stadion; Attendance: 800; Referee: (Hungary) Balázs Berke

28 October 2017 14	Mezőkövesd	0–1	Ferencváros	Mezőkövesd, Borsod-Abaúj-Zemplén County
15:30 CEST		Report	Böde 39'	Stadium: Mezőkövesdi Városi Stadion; Attendance: 2,935; Referee: (Hungary) Csaba Pinter

4 November 2017 15	Videoton	4–0	Mezőkövesd	Felcsút, Fejér County
15:30 CET	Lazović 7', 66'; Henty 17'; Šćepović 36'	Report		Stadium: Pancho Arena; Attendance: 1,347; Referee: (Hungary) Ferenc Karakó

18 November 2017 16	Mezőkövesd	3–3	Vasas	Mezőkövesd, Borsod-Abaúj-Zemplén County
15:30 CET	Koszta 13', 59'; Střeštík 64'	Report	Burmeister 28'; Berecz 63'; Gaál 66'	Stadium: Mezőkövesdi Városi Stadion; Attendance: 2,430; Referee: (Hungary) Zsolt Szabó

25 November 2017 17	Budapest Honvéd	1–2	Mezőkövesd	Budapest, Pest County
15:30 CET	Danilo 1'	Report	Novák 10'; Koszta 50'	Stadium: Bozsik Stadion; Attendance: 1,728; Referee: (Hungary) Zoltán Iványi

2 December 2017 18	Mezőkövesd	0–0	Diósgyőr	Mezőkövesd, Borsod-Abaúj-Zemplén County
15:30 CET		Report		Stadium: Mezőkövesdi Városi Stadion; Attendance: 3,254; Referee: (Hungary) Zsolt Szabó

9 December 2017 19	Balmazújváros	0–0	Mezőkövesd	Balmazújváros, Hajdú-Bihar County
15:30 CET		Report		Stadium: Városi Sportpálya; Attendance: 674; Referee: (Hungary) Sándor Andó-Szabó

24 February 2018 20	Mezőkövesd	0–0	Puskás Akadémia	Mezőkövesd, Borsod-Abaúj-Zemplén County
17:00 CET		Report		Stadium: Mezőkövesdi Városi Stadion; Attendance: 1,500; Referee: (Hungary) Balázs Berke

3 March 2018 21	Újpest	2–3	Mezőkövesd	Budapest, Pest County
17:00 CET	Novothny 4' (pen.); D. Nagy 56'	Report	Mlinar 41'; Koszta 70', 78' (pen.)	Stadium: Szusza Ferenc Stadion; Attendance: 1,546; Referee: (Hungary) István Vad

10 March 2018 22	Mezőkövesd	2–1	Szombathely	Mezőkövesd, Borsod-Abaúj-Zemplén County
17:00 CET	Cseri 58'; Koszta 78'	Report	Wils 75'	Stadium: Mezőkövesdi Városi Stadion; Attendance: 2,122; Referee: (Hungary) József Erdős

17 March 2018 23	Debrecen	2–3	Mezőkövesd	Debrecen, Hajdú-Bihar County
17:00 CET	Könyves 16'; Szatmári 81'	Report	Koszta 36' (pen.); Bognár 41'; Farkaš 55'	Stadium: Nagyerdei Stadion; Attendance: 1,635; Referee: (Hungary) Gergely Szőts

31 March 2018 24	Mezőkövesd	2–3	Paks	Mezőkövesd, Borsod-Abaúj-Zemplén County
17:00 CEST	Dražić 81', 90+4'	Report	Hahn 13'; Bertus 22'; Bartha 68'	Stadium: Városi Stadion; Attendance: 1,430; Referee: (Hungary) Sándor Andó-Szabó

7 April 2018 25	Ferencváros	3–0	Mezőkövesd	Budapest, Pest County
14:30 CEST	Böde 32'; Varga 50'; Georgijević 88'	Report		Stadium: Groupama Arena; Attendance: 8,375; Referee: (Hungary) Péter Solymosi

14 April 2018 26	Mezőkövesd	0–0	Videoton	Mezőkövesd, Borsod-Abaúj-Zemplén County
17:00 CEST		Report		Stadium: Városi Stadion; Attendance: 1,680; Referee: (Hungary) Viktor Kassai

21 April 2018 27	Vasas	0–0	Mezőkövesd	Budapest, Pest County
17:00 CEST		Report		Stadium: Szusza Ferenc Stadion; Attendance: 1,500; Referee: (Hungary) Balázs Berke

28 April 2018 28	Mezőkövesd	1–2	Budapest Honvéd	Mezőkövesd, Borsod-Abaúj-Zemplén County
17:00 CEST	Tóth 21'	Report	Eppel 12'; Lanzafame 25'	Stadium: Városi Stadion; Attendance: 1,756; Referee: (Hungary) Tamás Bognár

=== League table ===
Pos	Team	Pld	W	D	L	GF	GA	GD	Pts	Qualification or relegation
7	Paks	33	11	9	13	43	48	−5	42	
8	Szombathelyi Haladás	33	11	5	17	35	50	−15	38	
9	Mezőkövesd	33	9	10	14	35	52	−17	37	
10	Diósgyőr	33	10	6	17	44	53	−9	36	
11	Balmazújváros (R)	33	8	12	13	39	46	−7	36	Relegation to the Nemzeti Bajnokság II

Source: Hungarian Football Federation (in Hungarian), Soccerway
Rules for classification: 1) Points; 2) Matches won; 3) Goal difference; 4) Goals scored; 5) Head-to-head points; 6) Head-to-head goal difference; 7) Head-to-head away goals scored; 8) Fair play ranking; 9) Drawing of lots.
(R) Relegated

=== Results summary ===
Overall								Home						Away					
Pld	W	D	L	GF	GA	GD	Pts	W	D	L	GF	GA	GD	W	D	L	GF	GA	GD
28	6	10	12	31	49	−18	28	2	5	7	16	24	−8	4	5	5	15	25	−10

Last updated: 28 April 2018.
Source: NB1

=== Results by round ===
Round	1	2	3	4	5	6	7	8	9	10	11	12	13	14	15	16	17	18	19	20	21	22	23	24	25	26	27	28	29	30	31	32	33
Ground	A	H	A	H	A	H	A	H	A	H	A	H	A	H	A	H	A	H	A	H	A	H	A	H	A	H	A	H					
Result	W	W	L	L	D	L	L	D	L	L	D	L	D	L	L	D	W	D	D	D	W	W	W	L	L	D	D	L					
Position	3	1	3	5	5	6	9	9	11	11	11	11	12	12	12	12	12	12	12	12	12	12	8	10	11	11	11	12					

Updated to match(es) played on 28 April 2018. Source: Matches
A = Away; H = Home; W = Win; D = Draw; L = Loss

== Hungarian Cup ==
20 September 2017 Round 6	Kecskemét	1–4	Mezőkövesd	Kecskemét, Bács-Kiskun County
15:00 CEST	Balog 7'	Report	Baracskai 6'; Majtán 61', 82', 90+1'	Stadium: Műkertvárosi Sportcentrum; Attendance: 600; Referee: (Hungary) Mátyás Farkas

25 October 2017 Round 7	Gyirmót	2–1 (a.e.t.)	Mezőkövesd	Győr, Győr-Moson-Sopron County
17:00 CEST	Stieber 36'; Kiss 95'	Report	Novák 26'	Stadium: Ménfői úti Stadion; Attendance: 500; Referee: (Hungary) Zoltán J. Kovács
