= 2016–17 Mezőkövesdi SE season =

Mezőkövesd
2016–17 season
- Chairman: András Tállai
- Manager: Attila Pintér (until 22 December); Tomislav Sivić (from 27 December to 2 May); Mikuláš Radványi (from 2 May)
- Stadium: Városi Stadion
- Nemzeti Bajnokság I: 9th
- Magyar Kupa: Semi-finals
- Top goalscorer: League: Gábor Molnár (8); All: Gábor Molnár (11)
- Highest home attendance: 3,562 v Ferencváros (3 December 2016, Nemzeti Bajnokság I)
- Lowest home attendance: 570 v Szolnok (28 March 2017, Magyar Kupa)
- Average home league attendance: 2,090
- Biggest win: 13–0 v Marcali (Away, 26 October 2016, Magyar Kupa)
- Biggest defeat: 0–5 v Paks (Away, 25 February 2017, Nemzeti Bajnokság I); 0–5 v Vasas (Home, 17 May 2017, Magyar Kupa)

The 2016–17 season was Mezőkövesdi Sport Egyesület's 2nd competitive season, 39th season in existence as a football club and first season in the Nemzeti Bajnokság I following their promotion from the Nemzeti Bajnokság II in the previous season. In addition to the domestic league, Mezőkövesd participated in that season's editions of the Magyar Kupa.

Besides Mezőkövesd, Diósgyőr also played their matches at the Városi Stadion during the season due to the ongoing construction of the Diósgyőri Stadion. (Note: As Diósgyőr played their home games at the Városi Stadion in Mezőkövesd, the match against each other could not be played there under the competition rules, it was played in the Nagyerdei Stadion in Debrecen.)

On 22 December 2016, Attila Pintér was signed by first placed Nemzeti Bajnokság II club Puskás Akadémia, while the team was in 5th place. On 27 December, Tomislav Sivić was named as the manager who was in charge of Serbia U21s previously. On 2 May 2017, Sivić was sacked and Mikuláš Radványi received the task to avoid relegation.

== Squad ==
Squad at end of season

Note: Flags indicate national team as defined under FIFA eligibility rules; some limited exceptions apply. Players may hold more than one non-FIFA nationality.

| No. | Pos. | Nation | Player |
|---|---|---|---|
| 1 | GK | HUN | Dávid Dombó |
| 2 | DF | SRB | Daniel Farkaš |
| 3 | DF | SVK | Dominik Fótyik |
| 4 | DF | HUN | Béla Balogh |
| 6 | DF | HUN | Gergő Gohér |
| 7 | MF | HUN | Bence Tóth |
| 8 | FW | HUN | Roland Baracskai |
| 9 | FW | MLI | Ulysse Diallo |
| 11 | MF | HUN | Márk Orosz |
| 14 | FW | SRB | Lazar Veselinović |
| 15 | MF | CZE | Marek Střeštík |
| 17 | MF | HUN | Tamás Egerszegi |
| 19 | FW | EST | Tarmo Kink |

| No. | Pos. | Nation | Player |
|---|---|---|---|
| 20 | MF | SVK | Peter Šulek |
| 21 | DF | MKD | Aleksandar Damchevski |
| 23 | MF | CRO | Marko Dinjar |
| 24 | MF | HUN | Dávid Hegedűs |
| 28 | MF | CRO | Stipe Bačelić-Grgić |
| 29 | DF | HUN | András Vági |
| 33 | MF | HUN | Gábor Molnár |
| 39 | DF | SVK | Dávid Hudák |
| 49 | DF | SRB | Branko Pauljević |
| 50 | GK | HUN | Márton Czuczi |
| 88 | MF | HUN | Tamás Szeles |
| 90 | GK | SVK | Tomáš Tujvel |
| 99 | FW | HUN | Bence Sós |

== Transfers ==
=== Transfers in ===
| Transfer window | Pos. | No. | Player | From |
|---|---|---|---|---|
| Summer | MF | 5 | (Cameroon) Patrick Mevoungou | (Cameroon) Canon Yaoundé |
| Summer | DF | 6 | (Hungary) Gergő Gohér | Soroksár |
| Summer | FW | 9 | (Mali) Ulysse Diallo | Free agent (Note: Previous club Marítimo.) |
| Summer | MF | 15 | (Czech Republic) Marek Střeštík | MTK |
| Summer | MF | 17 | (Hungary) Tamás Egerszegi | Free agent (Note: Previous club Diósgyőr.) |
| Summer | FW | 19 | (Estonia) Tarmo Kink | (Finland) SJK |
| Summer | DF | 39 | (Slovakia) Dávid Hudák | (Slovakia) Slovan Bratislava |
| Summer | GK | 50 | (Hungary) Márton Czuczi | Szigetszentmiklós |
| Summer | MF | 77 | (Czech Republic) Jan Vošahlík | (Czech Republic) Slavia Prague |
| Summer | GK | 90 | (Slovakia) Tomáš Tujvel | Videoton |
| Winter | DF | 2 | (Serbia) Daniel Farkaš | (Serbia) Spartak Subotica |
| Winter | DF | 4 | (Hungary) Béla Balogh | Free agent (Note: Previous club Gyirmót.) |
| Winter | FW | 14 | (Serbia) Lazar Veselinović | (South Korea) Pohang Steelers |
| Winter | MF | 20 | (Slovakia) Peter Šulek | (Czech Republic) Vysočina Jihlava |
| Winter | DF | 21 | (North Macedonia) Aleksandar Damchevski | Free agent (Note: Previous club Atyrau.) |
| Winter | MF | 23 | (Croatia) Marko Dinjar | Free agent (Note: Previous club Kozármisleny.) |

=== Transfers out ===
| Transfer window | Pos. | No. | Player | To |
|---|---|---|---|---|
| Summer | MF | – | (Hungary) István Bagi | Békéscsaba |
| Summer | FW | 8 | (Hungary) Ferenc Rácz | Győr |
| Summer | DF | 14 | (Hungary) Gábor Dvorschák | Nyíregyháza |
| Summer | DF | 17 | (Hungary) József Nagy | Győr |
| Summer | MF | 20 | (Hungary) Zsolt Tamási | Nyíregyháza |
| Summer | DF | 23 | (Hungary) Balázs Nánási | Cegléd |
| Summer | MF | 28 | (Hungary) Tamás Tajthy | Győr |
| Summer | MF | 77 | (Hungary) László Tóth | Szolnok |
| Winter | MF | 5 | (Cameroon) Patrick Mevoungou | Diósgyőr |
| Winter | DF | 12 | (Hungary) Gábor Polényi | Zalaegerszeg |
| Winter | FW | 20 | (Romania) Onișor Nicorec | Cigánd |
| Winter | MF | 77 | (Czech Republic) Jan Vošahlík | (Czech Republic) Teplice |

=== Loans in ===
| Transfer window | Pos. | No. | Player | From | End date |
|---|---|---|---|---|---|
| Summer | MF | 13 | (Hungary) Szilárd Devecseri | Haladás | Middle of season |
| Summer | MF | 28 | (Croatia) Stipe Bačelić-Grgić | Puskás Akadémia | End of season |
| Summer | DF | 29 | (Hungary) András Vági | Paks | End of season |
| Summer | DF | 49 | (Serbia) Branko Pauljević | Puskás Akadémia | End of season |
| Summer | FW | 99 | (Hungary) Bence Sós | Debrecen | End of season |

=== Loans out ===
| Transfer window | Pos. | No. | Player | To | End date |
|---|---|---|---|---|---|
| Summer | GK | – | (Hungary) Levente Hosszú | Szigetszentmiklós | End of season |
| Summer | MF | 9 | (Hungary) Norbert Heffler | Nyíregyháza | Middle of season |
| Summer | DF | 16 | (Hungary) István Csirmaz | Szolnok | Middle of season |
| Summer | GK | 84 | (Slovakia) Ladislav Rybánsky | Békéscsaba | End of season |
| Winter | MF | 9 | (Hungary) Norbert Heffler | Balmazújváros | End of season |
| Winter | FW | 10 | (Hungary) Roland Frőhlich | Cegléd | End of season |
| Winter | DF | 55 | (Serbia) Mihailo Milutinović | Kozármisleny | End of season |

== Competitions ==
=== Overview ===
| Competition | First match | Last match | Starting round | Final position | Record | | | | | | | |
| Competition | First match | Last match | Starting round | Final position | Pld | W | D | L | GF | GA | GD | Win % |
|---|---|---|---|---|---|---|---|---|---|---|---|---|
| Nemzeti Bajnokság I | 16 July 2016 | 27 May 2017 | Matchday 1 | 9th | 33 | 10 | 10 | 13 | 39 | 54 | −15 | 30.30 |
| Magyar Kupa | 14 September 2016 | 17 May 2017 | Round of 128 | Semi-finals | 10 | 6 | 2 | 2 | 26 | 13 | +13 | 60.00 |
| Total | | | | | 43 | 16 | 12 | 15 | 65 | 67 | −2 | 37.21 |

Source: Competitions

=== Nemzeti Bajnokság I ===
==== League table ====
| Pos | Team | Pld | W | D | L | GF | GA | GD | Pts | Qualification or relegation |
|---|---|---|---|---|---|---|---|---|---|---|
| 7 | Újpest | 33 | 10 | 12 | 11 | 47 | 51 | −4 | 42 | |
| 8 | Debrecen | 33 | 11 | 8 | 14 | 42 | 46 | −4 | 41 | |
| 9 | Mezőkövesd | 33 | 10 | 10 | 13 | 39 | 54 | −15 | 40 | |
| 10 | Diósgyőr | 33 | 10 | 7 | 16 | 39 | 58 | −19 | 37 | |
| 11 | MTK (R) | 33 | 8 | 13 | 12 | 26 | 36 | −10 | 37 | Relegation to the Nemzeti Bajnokság II |

Source: Hungarian Football Federation (in Hungarian), Soccerway
Rules for classification: 1) Points; 2) Matches won; 3) Goal difference; 4) Goals scored; 5) Head-to-head points; 6) Head-to-head goal difference; 7) Head-to-head away goals scored; 8) Fairplay; 9) Draw.
(R) Relegated

==== Results summary ====
| Overall | | | | | | | | Home | | | | | | Away | | | | | |
| Pld | W | D | L | GF | GA | GD | Pts | W | D | L | GF | GA | GD | W | D | L | GF | GA | GD |
|---|---|---|---|---|---|---|---|---|---|---|---|---|---|---|---|---|---|---|---|
| 33 | 10 | 10 | 13 | 39 | 54 | −15 | 40 | 8 | 2 | 6 | 25 | 24 | +1 | 2 | 8 | 7 | 14 | 30 | −16 |

Source: Hungarian Football Federation

==== Results by round ====
| Round | 1 | 2 | 3 | 4 | 5 | 6 | 7 | 8 | 9 | 10 | 11 | 12 | 13 | 14 | 15 | 16 | 17 | 18 | 19 | 20 | 21 | 22 | 23 | 24 | 25 | 26 | 27 | 28 | 29 | 30 | 31 | 32 | 33 |
|---|---|---|---|---|---|---|---|---|---|---|---|---|---|---|---|---|---|---|---|---|---|---|---|---|---|---|---|---|---|---|---|---|---|
| Ground | H | A | A | H | A | H | A | H | A | H | A | A | H | H | A | H | A | H | A | H | A | H | H | A | A | H | A | H | A | H | A | H | A |
| Result | D | D | W | L | L | L | D | W | D | L | L | W | W | W | D | W | D | W | L | W | L | L | D | L | L | W | D | L | L | L | D | W | D |
| Position | 6 | 5 | 4 | 8 | 9 | 11 | 10 | 8 | 8 | 10 | 11 | 8 | 7 | 6 | 6 | 5 | 6 | 5 | 5 | 5 | 5 | 6 | 7 | 7 | 8 | 8 | 8 | 8 | 8 | 10 | 10 | 8 | 9 |
| Points | 1 | 2 | 5 | 5 | 5 | 5 | 6 | 9 | 10 | 10 | 10 | 13 | 16 | 19 | 20 | 23 | 24 | 27 | 27 | 30 | 30 | 30 | 31 | 31 | 31 | 34 | 35 | 35 | 35 | 35 | 36 | 39 | 40 |

Source: Matches
A = Away; H = Home; W = Win; D = Draw; L = Loss

==== Matches ====
| 16 July 2016 1 | Mezőkövesd | 2–2 | Gyirmót | Mezőkövesd |
| 18:00 CEST (UTC+2) | Střeštík 23', 88'; Devecseri (yellow card) 64' | Report | Szegi (yellow card) 44'; Lengyel 66'; O. Nagy (yellow card) 83'; Vass 86' | Stadium: Városi Stadion; Attendance: 2,548; Referee: István Vad; Assistant referees: László Viszokai, Gábor Varga Jr. Fourth official: Gergely Becséri; Goal-line assistants: Ádám Németh, János Takács |

| 23 July 2016 2 | Haladás | 1–1 | Mezőkövesd | Sopron (Note: The match was played at the Káposztás utcai Stadion in Sopron, instead of Haladás regular stadium, the Rohonci út in Szombathely, which was demolished to make way to the newly built Haladás Sportkomplexum.) |
| 18:00 CEST (UTC+2) | Rácz 7'; Jagodics (yellow card) 29'; Gaál (yellow card) 46'; Németh (yellow card) 84'; Jancsó (yellow card) 85' | Report | Nicorec (yellow card) 7'; Gohér 41'; Bačelić-Grgić (yellow card) 44'; Kink (yellow card) 65'; B. Tóth (red card) 77' | Stadium: Káposztás utcai Stadion; Attendance: 1,225; Referee: Sándor Andó-Szabó; Assistant referees: Gábor Erős, Dániel Szalai; Fourth official: Zoltán Horváth; Goal-line assistants: Balázs Berke, Attila Molnár |

| 31 July 2016 3 | MTK | 0–1 | Mezőkövesd | Dunaújváros (Note: The match was played at the Dunaújvárosi Stadion in Dunaújváros, instead of MTK regular stadium, the Hidegkuti Nándor Stadion in Budapest, built in 1947 which was demolished to make way to the newly built Hidegkuti Nándor Stadion.) |
| 18:00 CEST (UTC+2) | Baki (yellow card) 82' | Report | Kink 59'; Vági (yellow card) 80'; Nicorec (yellow card) 83' | Stadium: Dunaújvárosi Stadion; Attendance: 408; Referee: Péter Solymosi; Assistant referees: Róbert Horváth, Gábor Varga Jr. Fourth official: Gergely Becséri; Goal-line assistants: Ferenc Karakó, József Erdős |

| 7 August 2016 4 | Mezőkövesd | 0–1 | Debrecen | Mezőkövesd |
| 18:00 CEST (UTC+2) | Egerszegi (yellow card) 37'; Kink (yellow card) 90+1' | Report | Kuti 55'; Tisza (red card) 61'; Horváth (yellow card) 79'; Takács (yellow card) 90'; Jovanović (yellow card) 90+1'; Danilović (yellow card) 90+3' | Stadium: Városi Stadion; Attendance: 3,248; Referee: Gergely Szőts; Assistant referees: Gábor Varga Jr., Balázs Szalai; Fourth official: Dániel Szalai; Goal-line assistants: Tamás Bognár, Gábor Oláh |

| 13 August 2016 5 | Videoton | 2–0 | Mezőkövesd | Felcsút (Note: The match was played at the Pancho Aréna in Felcsút, instead of Videoton regular stadium, the Sóstói Stadion in Székesfehérvár, built in 1967 which was demolished to make way to the newly built Sóstói Stadion.) |
| 18:00 CEST (UTC+2) | Suljić (yellow card) 3'; Pátkai 9'; Lazović 13' | Report | Vošahlík (yellow card) 4'; Pauljević (yellow card) 67' | Stadium: Pancho Aréna; Attendance: 1,539; Referee: Zsolt Szabó; Assistant referees: Vencel Tóth II, Balázs Farkas; Fourth official: Georgiou Theodoros; Goal-line assistants: István Vad, Gyöngyi Gaál |

| 17 August 2016 6 | Mezőkövesd | 0–2 | Újpest | Mezőkövesd |
| 19:00 CEST (UTC+2) | Hudák (yellow card) 66' | Report | Andrić 29', (yellow card) 58'; Diarra 43'; Sanković (yellow card) 62' | Stadium: Városi Stadion; Attendance: 2,452; Referee: Balázs Berke; Assistant referees: Gábor Erős, Gábor Varga Jr. Fourth official: Róbert Horváth; Goal-line assistants: Viktor Kassai, Tamás Nazsa |

| 21 August 2016 7 | Ferencváros | 2–2 | Mezőkövesd | Budapest |
| 18:00 CEST (UTC+2) | Djuricin 9'; Varga (yellow card) 59'; Nagy 84', (yellow card) 90+2' | Report | Devecseri (yellow card) 59'; Egerszegi (yellow card) 59'; Hudák 63'; Baracskai (yellow card) 70'; Bačelić-Grgić 79'; Tujvel (yellow card) 88' | Stadium: Groupama Arena; Attendance: 5,242; Referee: Tamás Bognár; Assistant referees: Georgiou Theodoros, Gergely Becséri; Fourth official: Gábor Kormányos II; Goal-line assistants: Sándor Andó-Szabó, János Takács |

| 10 September 2016 8 | Mezőkövesd | 3–1 | Honvéd | Mezőkövesd |
| 18:00 CEST (UTC+2) | Bačelić-Grgić 29'; Střeštík 52', (yellow card) 80'; Egerszegi 88' | Report | Hidi 11', (red card) 75'; Lovrić (yellow card) 36'; Baráth (yellow card) 88' | Stadium: Városi Stadion; Attendance: 1,670; Referee: Zoltán Iványi; Assistant referees: István Albert, Balázs Buzás; Fourth official: János Medovarszki; Goal-line assistants: Gergely Szőts, Eszter Urbán |

| 17 September 2016 9 | Diósgyőr | 1–1 | Mezőkövesd | Miskolc |
| 18:30 CEST (UTC+2) | Vela (yellow card) 15'; Daushvili (yellow card) 31'; Novothny 68'; Németh (yellow card) 89' | Report | Egerszegi 26'; Sós (red card) 38'; Bačelić-Grgić (yellow card) 75'; Mevoungou (yellow card) 79'; Dombó (yellow card) 90'; Střeštík (red card) 90+8' | Stadium: Diósgyőri Stadion; Attendance: 2,950; Referee: Tamás Bognár; Assistant referees: Péter Berettyán, Dániel Szalai; Fourth official: Gábor Varga Jr. Goal-line assistants: István Vad, Attila Molnár |

| 21 September 2016 10 | Mezőkövesd | 1–3 | Paks | Mezőkövesd |
| 19:00 CEST (UTC+2) | Frőhlich 13'; Egerszegi (yellow card) 53'; Fótyik (yellow card) 61' | Report | Haraszti 19'; Bartha 41'; Hahn 57'; Kecskés (red card) 73' | Stadium: Városi Stadion; Attendance: 1,215; Referee: József Erdős; Assistant referees: Gábor Erős, Balázs Szalai; Fourth official: Róbert Horváth; Goal-line assistants: Péter Solymosi, Ádám Farkas |

| 24 September 2016 11 | Vasas | 4–0 | Mezőkövesd | Budapest |
| 18:00 CEST (UTC+2) | Ádám 43', 50'; Berecz 63'; Vida 90+1' | Report | Hudák (yellow card) 49'; Mevoungou (yellow card) 84' | Stadium: Illovszky Rudolf Stadion; Attendance: 2,832; Referee: Péter Solymosi; Assistant referees: István Albert, Péter Berettyán; Fourth official: Attila Kelemen; Goal-line assistants: Csaba Pintér, Eszter Urbán |

| 15 October 2016 12 | Gyirmót | 0–1 | Mezőkövesd | Győr |
| 15:30 CEST (UTC+2) | Vass (yellow card) 17'; Présinger (yellow card) 70' | Report | Szeles (yellow card) 49'; Diallo 90+2', (yellow card) 90+2' | Stadium: Alcufer Stadion; Attendance: 1,100; Referee: Ádám Farkas; Assistant referees: Attila Kelemen, Gábor Varga Jr. Fourth official: Péter Kóbor; Goal-line assistants: Balázs Berke, Ádám Németh |

| 22 October 2016 13 | Mezőkövesd | 3–0 | Haladás | Mezőkövesd |
| 18:00 CEST (UTC+2) | Diallo 38', 50', (yellow card) 62'; Molnár 59'; Kink (yellow card) 77' | Report | Kovács (yellow card) 47'; Rácz (yellow card) 63' | Stadium: Városi Stadion; Attendance: 1,500; Referee: Zsolt Szabó; Assistant referees: Georgiou Theodoros, Arnold Kepe; Fourth official: Dániel Szalai; Goal-line assistants: Attila Molnár, Eszter Urbán |

| 29 October 2016 14 | Mezőkövesd | 1–0 | MTK | Mezőkövesd |
| 18:00 CEST (UTC+2) | Kink (yellow card) 39'; Hudák (yellow card) 52'; Gohér 74' | Report | Okuka (yellow card) 55' | Stadium: Városi Stadion; Attendance: 1,815; Referee: Balázs Berke; Assistant referees: Oszkár Lémon, Attila Kelemen; Fourth official: Gábor Varga Jr. Goal-line assistants: Szabolcs Szilasi, Eszter Urbán |

| 5 November 2016 15 | Debrecen | 0–0 | Mezőkövesd | Debrecen |
| 15:30 CET (UTC+1) | | Report | Gohér (yellow card) 55' | Stadium: Nagyerdei Stadion; Attendance: 2,385; Referee: Zoltán Iványi; Assistant referees: György Ring, Balázs Buzás; Fourth official: Gábor Kormányos II; Goal-line assistants: Ádám Farkas, Gergely Szőts |

| 19 November 2016 16 | Mezőkövesd | 2–1 | Videoton | Mezőkövesd |
| 15:30 CET (UTC+1) | Kink 9'; Szeles (yellow card) 18'; Střeštík 86' | Report | Lazović (yellow card) 17'; Šćepović 27'; Pátkai (yellow card) 33'; Hadžić (yellow card) 41'; Négo (yellow card) 56' | Stadium: Városi Stadion; Attendance: 2,005; Referee: István Vad; Assistant referees: István Albert, Péter Berettyán; Fourth official: Balázs Farkas; Goal-line assistants: Szabolcs Szilasi, Gyöngyi Gaál |

| 26 November 2016 17 | Újpest | 1–1 | Mezőkövesd | Kecskemét (Note: The match was played at the Széktói Stadion in Kecskemét, instead of Újpest regular stadium, the Szusza Ferenc Stadion in Budapest, due to the renovation work were still underway.) |
| 15:30 CET (UTC+1) | Windecker (yellow card) 42'; Andrić 51'; Bardhi (yellow card) 58' | Report | Pauljević 55', (yellow card) 62'; Hudák (yellow card) 55'; Tujvel (yellow card) 90+2' | Stadium: Széktói Stadion; Attendance: 700; Referee: Sándor Andó-Szabó; Assistant referees: Gábor Erős, Attila Kelemen; Fourth official: Gábor Varga Jr. Goal-line assistants: Péter Solymosi, Csaba Pintér |

| 3 December 2016 18 | Mezőkövesd | 2–0 | Ferencváros | Mezőkövesd |
| 15:30 CET (UTC+1) | Molnár 44'; Mevoungou (yellow card) 55'; Bačelić-Grgić 81'; Tóth (yellow card) 89' | Report | Čukić (yellow card) 37'; Nagy (yellow card) 79' | Stadium: Városi Stadion; Attendance: 3,562; Referee: Zsolt Szabó; Assistant referees: Balázs Szert, Balázs Szalai; Fourth official: Gábor Varga Jr. Goal-line assistants: Gergely Szőts, Eszter Urbán |

| 10 December 2016 19 | Honvéd | 1–0 | Mezőkövesd | Budapest |
| 15:30 CET (UTC+1) | Eppel 70'; Koszta (yellow card) 80' | Report | Molnár (yellow card) 49'; Devecseri (yellow card) 61'; Mevoungou (yellow card) 90+1' | Stadium: Bozsik József Stadion; Attendance: 1,679; Referee: Balázs Berke; Assistant referees: László Viszokai, Róbert Horváth; Fourth official: Balázs Farkas; Goal-line assistants: Ádám Németh, Katalin Kulcsár |

| 18 February 2017 20 | Mezőkövesd | 3–0 | Diósgyőr | Mezőkövesd |
| 15:30 CET (UTC+1) | Balogh 37'; Egerszegi (yellow card) 43'; Bačelić-Grgić 59', (yellow card) 77'; Molnár 81' | Report | Busai (yellow card) 29'; Ugrai (red card) 36'; Makrai (yellow card) 85' | Stadium: Városi Stadion; Attendance: 3,325; Referee: István Vad; Assistant referees: István Albert, Péter Berettyán; Fourth official: Gábor Kormányos II; Goal-line assistants: Sándor Andó-Szabó, Eszter Urbán |

| 25 February 2017 21 | Paks | 5–0 | Mezőkövesd | Paks |
| 15:30 CET (UTC+1) | Szabó 19'; Gévay 26'; Kulcsár 31'; Papp 41'; Haraszti (yellow card) 59'; Bartha 86' | Report | Hudák (yellow card) 7' | Stadium: Fehérvári úti Stadion; Attendance: 1,023; Referee: Gergely Szőts; Assistant referees: Gábor Varga Jr., Balázs Szert; Fourth official: Balázs Szalai; Goal-line assistants: Csaba Pintér, Péter Zierkelbach |

| 4 March 2017 22 | Mezőkövesd | 0–2 | Vasas | Mezőkövesd |
| 15:30 CET (UTC+1) | Tóth (yellow card) 37'; Farkaš (yellow card) 50' | Report | Ristevski 20'; Hangya (yellow card) 48'; Berecz 50'; James (yellow card) 86' | Stadium: Városi Stadion; Attendance: 2,200; Referee: József Erdős; Assistant referees: Vencel Tóth II, Dániel Szalai; Fourth official: László Viszokai; Goal-line assistants: Csaba Pintér, Attila Molnár |

| 11 March 2017 23 | Mezőkövesd | 1–1 | Gyirmót | Mezőkövesd |
| 15:30 CET (UTC+1) | Egerszegi (yellow card) 6'; Molnár 63' | Report | Bojović 22'; Bebeto (yellow card) 66'; Á. Simon (yellow card) 67'; A. Simon (yellow card) 68' | Stadium: Városi Stadion; Attendance: 1,518; Referee: Ádám Farkas; Assistant referees: Balázs Szert, Róbert Horváth; Fourth official: Gábor Varga Jr. Goal-line assistants: Péter Solymosi, Tibor Gyarmati II |

| 1 April 2017 24 | Haladás | 4–2 | Mezőkövesd | Sopron |
| 18:00 CEST (UTC+2) | Wils 16'; Iszlai 48', (yellow card) 56'; Kovács 62'; Williams 67' | Report | Molnár 38'; Baracskai 89' | Stadium: Káposztás utcai Stadion; Attendance: 1,565; Referee: Gergely Szőts; Assistant referees: György Ring, Balázs Szalai; Fourth official: Dániel Szalai; Goal-line assistants: Zsolt Szabó, Katalin Kulcsár |

| 8 April 2017 25 | MTK | 2–0 | Mezőkövesd | Budapest |
| 18:00 CEST (UTC+2) | Vadnai (yellow card) 5'; Kanta (yellow card) 31'; Torghelle 37', (yellow card) 60'; Baki 43', (yellow card) 50' | Report | Tóth (yellow card) 62' | Stadium: Hidegkuti Nándor Stadion; Attendance: 1,264; Referee: Ádám Farkas; Assistant referees: Balázs Szert, Krisztián Király; Fourth official: Dániel Szalai; Goal-line assistants: Csaba Pintér, János Takács |

| 12 April 2017 26 | Mezőkövesd | 2–1 | Debrecen | Mezőkövesd |
| 18:00 CEST (UTC+2) | Veselinović 7'; Szeles (yellow card) 20'; Hudák (yellow card) 67'; Baracskai 79' | Report | Holman (yellow card) 26'; Suk (yellow card) 67'; Tőzsér 83' | Stadium: Városi Stadion; Attendance: 1,390; Referee: István Vad; Assistant referees: György Ring, László Viszokai; Fourth official: Gergely Becséri; Goal-line assistants: József Erdős, Katalin Kulcsár |

| 15 April 2017 27 | Videoton | 1–1 | Mezőkövesd | Felcsút |
| 18:00 CEST (UTC+2) | Suljić 25'; Fiola (yellow card) 68'; Juhász (yellow card) 73' | Report | Hudák (yellow card) 7'; Molnár 27'; Gohér (yellow card) 59'; Bačelić-Grgić (yellow card) 73'; Tujvel (yellow card) 81'; Egerszegi (yellow card) 83' | Stadium: Pancho Aréna; Attendance: 1,651; Referee: Péter Solymosi; Assistant referees: István Albert, Balázs Buzás; Fourth official: Arnold Kepe; Goal-line assistants: Attila Molnár, Gyöngyi Gaál |

| 22 April 2017 28 | Mezőkövesd | 1–3 | Újpest | Mezőkövesd |
| 18:00 CEST (UTC+2) | Pauljević (red card) 85'; Bačelić-Grgić 90+1' | Report | Andrić 32', (yellow card) 64'; Bardhi 35'; Balázs (yellow card) 39', (goal) 72'; Szűcs (yellow card) 68' | Stadium: Városi Stadion; Attendance: 1,507; Referee: Viktor Kassai; Assistant referees: Péter Berettyán, Balázs Szalai; Fourth official: Gábor Varga Jr. Goal-line assistants: Sándor Andó-Szabó, Attila Molnár |

| 29 April 2017 29 | Ferencváros | 3–1 | Mezőkövesd | Budapest |
| 18:00 CEST (UTC+2) | Böde 20', 29'; Gera 23', (yellow card) 55'; Botka (yellow card) 71'; Nalepa (yellow card) 86' | Report | Tóth (yellow card) 24'; Molnár 38'; Vági (yellow card) 58' | Stadium: Groupama Arena; Attendance: 5,875; Referee: Balázs Berke; Assistant referees: Vencel Tóth II, Oszkár Lémon; Fourth official: Arnold Kepe; Goal-line assistants: János Takács, Katalin Kulcsár |

| 6 May 2017 30 | Mezőkövesd | 1–5 | Honvéd | Mezőkövesd |
| 18:00 CEST (UTC+2) | Hudák (yellow card) 13'; Kink 17'; Gohér (yellow card) 23'; Vági (yellow card) 48' | Report | Nagy (yellow card) 15'; Baráth (yellow card) 48'; Kamber 51'; Lanzafame 67', 88'; Bobál 75'; Gróf (yellow card) 81'; Eppel 84' | Stadium: Városi Stadion; Attendance: 2,105; Referee: Zsolt Szabó; Assistant referees: György Ring, Krisztián Király; Fourth official: Gergely Becséri; Goal-line assistants: Balázs Berke, Gergő Bogár |

| 13 May 2017 31 | Diósgyőr | 2–2 | Mezőkövesd | Debrecen |
| 18:00 CEST (UTC+2) | Makrai 48', (yellow card) 51'; Busai 68' | Report | Molnár 13'; Sós 17'; Tujvel (yellow card) 31'; Egerszegi (yellow card) 67'; Szeles (yellow card) 70'; Baracskai (yellow card) 90+1' | Stadium: Nagyerdei Stadion; Attendance: 3,043; Referee: Zoltán Iványi; Assistant referees: Georgiou Theodoros, Balázs Buzás; Fourth official: Róbert Horváth; Goal-line assistants: Ádám Farkas, János Takács |

| 20 May 2017 32 | Mezőkövesd | 3–2 | Paks | Mezőkövesd |
| 18:00 CEST (UTC+2) | Bačelić-Grgić 38', (yellow card) 43'; Vági (yellow card) 49'; G. Molnár (yellow card) 73'; Diallo 76'; Szeles (yellow card) 84'; Gohér 90+2' | Report | Hajdú (yellow card) 45'; Kulcsár 60', (yellow card) 68'; Bertus 89' | Stadium: Városi Stadion; Attendance: 1,390; Referee: Sándor Andó-Szabó; Assistant referees: Gergely Becséri, Róbert Horváth; Fourth official: Zoltán Horváth; Goal-line assistants: Gergely Szőts, Péter Zierkelbach |

| 27 May 2017 33 | Vasas | 1–1 | Mezőkövesd | Budapest (Note: The match was played at the Szusza Ferenc Stadion in Budapest, instead of Vasas regular stadium, the Illovszky Rudolf Stadion in Budapest, built in 1960 which was demolished to make way to the newly built Illovszky Rudolf Stadion.) |
| 19:00 CEST (UTC+2) | Vaskó 72' | Report | Fótyik (red card) 41'; Vági 49' | Stadium: Szusza Ferenc Stadion; Attendance: 2,400; Referee: Balázs Berke; Assistant referees: Krisztián Király, Gábor Varga Jr. Fourth official: Balázs Farkas; Goal-line assistants: Zsolt Szabó, Attila Molnár |

=== Magyar Kupa ===
| 14 September 2016 Round of 128 | Rakamaz | 0–2 | Mezőkövesd | Rakamaz |
| 15:30 CEST (UTC+2) | Deme (yellow card) 18'; Csáki (yellow card) 74' | Report | Molnár 51'; Pauljević 89' | Stadium: Rakamaz Sportpálya; Attendance: 400; Referee: József Ducsai; Assistant referees: László Szarvas, Tamás Kövér |

| 26 October 2016 Round of 64 | Marcali | 0–13 | Mezőkövesd | Marcali |
| 13:30 CEST (UTC+2) | Maros (yellow card) 72'; Czimondor (yellow card) 81' | Report | Bačelić-Grgić 30', 89'; B. Tóth 33', 45', 50'; Kink 38'; Vošahlík 49', 86'; Mevoungou 56', 75'; Baracskai 58'; Molnár 67'; Sós 81'; Devecseri (yellow card) 90' | Stadium: Marcali Városi FC Sporttelep; Attendance: 450; Referee: Péter Zierkelbach; Assistant referees: Georgiou Theodoros, István Iványi |

| 29 November 2016 Round of 32 | Rákospalota | 1–3 | Mezőkövesd | Budapest |
| 16:00 CET (UTC+1) | Kiss 12'; Pfister (red card) 40'; Pesti (yellow card) 45' | Report | Kink 8'; Szeles (yellow card) 44'; Nicorec 66'; Bačelić-Grgić 73'; Mevoungou (yellow card) 76' | Stadium: Budai II. László Stadion; Attendance: 400; Referee: Tibor Gyarmati II; Assistant referees: Zoltán Horváth, Dávid Bertalan; Fourth official: Mátyás Farkas |

==== Round of 16 ====
| 11 February 2017 First leg | Mezőkövesd | 0–0 | Gyirmót | Mezőkövesd |
| 14:00 CET (UTC+1) | Hudák (yellow card) 46'; Tóth (yellow card) 65' | Report | Bebeto (yellow card) 49' | Stadium: Városi Stadion; Attendance: 980; Referee: József Erdős; Assistant referees: Vencel Tóth II, Balázs Szert; Fourth official: Ádám Farkas |

| 1 March 2017 Second leg | Gyirmót | 1–1 (1–1 (a) agg.) | Mezőkövesd | Győr |
| 14:30 CET (UTC+1) | Vereș (yellow card) 44'; An. Simon 76' | Report | Hudák 63'; Egerszegi (yellow card) 66' | Stadium: Alcufer Stadion; Attendance: 300; Referee: Sándor Andó-Szabó; Assistant referees: Balázs Farkas, Gergely Becséri; Fourth official: Gábor Oláh |
Note: 1–1 on aggregate. Mezőkövesd won on away goals.

==== Quarter-finals ====
| 28 March 2017 First leg | Mezőkövesd | 3–1 | Szolnok | Mezőkövesd |
| 18:00 CEST (UTC+2) | Kenderes 2' (o.g.); Vági 25'; Veselinović 30', (yellow card) 47'; Střeštík (yellow card) 56' | Report | M. Balogh (yellow card) 33'; L. Tóth 45+1' | Stadium: Városi Stadion; Attendance: 570; Referee: Ádám Németh; Assistant referees: Gergely Becséri, János Medovarszki; Fourth official: Gábor Varga Jr. Goal-line assistants: Gergely Szőts, Gergő Bogár |

| 5 April 2017 Second leg | Szolnok | 3–4 (4–7 agg.) | Mezőkövesd | Szolnok |
| 17:00 CEST (UTC+2) | Hajba 5'; Pantović 47'; Berdó (yellow card) 65', (goal) 73' | Report | Szeles (yellow card) 19'; Diallo 26'; Egerszegi (yellow card) 35'; Dinjar (yellow card) 55'; Baracskai 72', (yellow card) 77'; Střeštík 76'; Molnár 84' | Stadium: Tiszaligeti Stadion; Attendance: 800; Referee: Balázs Berke; Assistant referees: István Albert, Balázs Farkas; Fourth official: János Medovarszki; Goal-line assistants: Péter Solymosi, Tibor Gyarmati II |
Note: Mezőkövesd won 7–4 on aggregate.

==== Semi-finals ====
| 26 April 2017 First leg | Vasas | 2–0 | Mezőkövesd | Budapest |
| 16:00 CEST (UTC+2) | Berecz 45+1' (pen.); Kulcsár 49' | Report | Egerszegi (yellow card) 45'; Diallo (yellow card) 53' | Stadium: Szusza Ferenc Stadion; Attendance: 1,000; Referee: Péter Solymosi; Assistant referees: Oszkár Lémon, Gábor Takács; Fourth official: Gergely Becséri; Goal-line assistants: Balázs Berke, Ádám Németh |

| 17 May 2017 Second leg | Mezőkövesd | 0–5 (0–7 agg.) | Vasas | Mezőkövesd |
| 20:00 CEST (UTC+2) | Tóth (yellow card) 32'; Farkaš (yellow card) 51'; Veselinović (yellow card) 52' | Report | Berecz 4'; Kulcsár 27'; Ristevski (yellow card) 52'; Sağlık 68'; Ádám 71'; Hangya 86' | Stadium: Városi Stadion; Attendance: 1,105; Referee: Csaba Pintér; Assistant referees: Balázs Szert, Balázs Farkas; Fourth official: Gábor Varga Jr. Goal-line assistants: Ferenc Karakó, Balázs Berke |
Note: Vasas won 7–0 on aggregate.

== Statistics ==
=== Overall ===
Appearances (Apps) numbers are for appearances in competitive games only, including sub appearances.
Source: Competitions

| No. | Player | Pos. | Nemzeti Bajnokság I | | | | Magyar Kupa | | | | Total | | | |
| No. | Player | Pos. | Apps | Goal | Booked | Sent off (straight red) | Apps | Goal | Booked | Sent off (straight red) | Apps | Goal | Booked | Sent off (straight red) |
|---|---|---|---|---|---|---|---|---|---|---|---|---|---|---|
| 1 | (Hungary) Dávid Dombó | GK | 9 | | 1 | | 3 | | | | 12 | | 1 | |
| 2 | (Serbia) Daniel Farkaš | DF | 7 | | 1 | | 3 | | 1 | | 10 | | 2 | |
| 3 | (Slovakia) Dominik Fótyik | DF | 11 | | 1 | 1 | 2 | | | | 13 | | 1 | 1 |
| 4 | (Hungary) Béla Balogh | DF | 3 | 1 | | | 4 | | | | 7 | 1 | | |
| 5 | (Cameroon) Patrick Mevoungou | MF | 12 | | 4 | | 2 | 2 | 1 | | 14 | 2 | 5 | |
| 6 | (Hungary) Gergő Gohér | DF | 22 | 3 | 3 | | 4 | | | | 26 | 3 | 3 | |
| 7 | (Hungary) Bence Tóth | MF | 20 | | 4 | 1 | 8 | 3 | 2 | | 28 | 3 | 6 | 1 |
| 8 | (Hungary) Roland Baracskai | FW | 11 | 2 | 2 | | 5 | 2 | 1 | | 16 | 4 | 3 | |
| 9 | (Mali) Ulysse Diallo | FW | 15 | 4 | 2 | | 5 | 1 | 1 | | 20 | 5 | 3 | |
| 10 | (Hungary) Roland Frőhlich | FW | 5 | 1 | | | 1 | | | | 6 | 1 | | |
| 11 | (Hungary) Márk Orosz | MF | 6 | | | | 4 | | | | 10 | | | |
| 12 | (Hungary) Gábor Polényi | DF | | | | | 1 | | | | 1 | | | |
| 13 | (Hungary) Szilárd Devecseri | DF | 13 | | 3 | | 3 | | 1 | | 16 | | 4 | |
| 14 | (Serbia) Lazar Veselinović | FW | 7 | 1 | | | 3 | 1 | 2 | | 10 | 2 | 2 | |
| 15 | (Czech Republic) Marek Střeštík | MF | 32 | 4 | 1 | 1 | 6 | 1 | 1 | | 38 | 5 | 2 | 1 |
| 17 | (Hungary) Tamás Egerszegi | MF | 27 | 2 | 7 | | 4 | | 3 | | 31 | 2 | 10 | |
| 19 | (Estonia) Tarmo Kink | FW | 25 | 3 | 4 | | 6 | 2 | | | 31 | 5 | 4 | |
| 20 | (Romania) Onișor Nicorec | FW | 7 | | 2 | | 3 | 1 | | | 10 | 1 | 2 | |
| 20 | (Slovakia) Peter Šulek | MF | 2 | | | | 1 | | | | 3 | | | |
| 21 | (North Macedonia) Aleksandar Damchevski | DF | 3 | | | | | | | | 3 | | | |
| 23 | (Croatia) Marko Dinjar | MF | 3 | | | | 3 | | 1 | | 6 | | 1 | |
| 24 | (Hungary) Dávid Hegedűs | MF | 8 | | | | 4 | | | | 12 | | | |
| 28 | (Croatia) Stipe Bačelić-Grgić | MF | 28 | 6 | 5 | | 5 | 3 | | | 33 | 9 | 5 | |
| 29 | (Hungary) András Vági | DF | 31 | 1 | 4 | | 3 | 1 | | | 34 | 2 | 4 | |
| 33 | (Hungary) Gábor Molnár | MF | 27 | 8 | 2 | | 9 | 3 | | | 36 | 11 | 2 | |
| 39 | (Slovakia) Dávid Hudák | DF | 30 | 1 | 8 | | 5 | 1 | 1 | | 35 | 2 | 9 | |
| 49 | (Serbia) Branko Pauljević | DF | 25 | 1 | 2 | 1 | 9 | 1 | | | 34 | 2 | 2 | 1 |
| 50 | (Hungary) Márton Czuczi | GK | | | | | | | | | | | | |
| 55 | (Serbia) Mihailo Milutinović | DF | | | | | | | | | | | | |
| 77 | (Czech Republic) Jan Vošahlík | MF | 6 | | 1 | | 2 | 2 | | | 8 | 2 | 1 | |
| 88 | (Hungary) Tamás Szeles | MF | 20 | | 5 | | 5 | | 2 | | 25 | | 7 | |
| 90 | (Slovakia) Tomáš Tujvel | GK | 24 | | 4 | | 8 | | | | 32 | | 4 | |
| 99 | (Hungary) Bence Sós | FW | 20 | 1 | | 1 | 5 | 1 | | | 25 | 2 | | 1 |
| Own goals | | | | | | | | 1 | | | | 1 | | |
| Totals | | | | 39 | 66 | 5 | | 26 | 17 | | | 65 | 83 | 5 |

=== Hat-tricks ===
| No. | Player | Against | Result | Date | Competition |
|---|---|---|---|---|---|
| 7 | (Hungary) Bence Tóth | Marcali (A) | 13–0 | 26 October 2016 | Magyar Kupa |

=== Clean sheets ===
| | | | Clean sheets | | |
| No. | Player | Games Played | Nemzeti Bajnokság I | Magyar Kupa | Total |
|---|---|---|---|---|---|
| 90 | (Slovakia) Tomáš Tujvel | 32 | 6 | 3 | 9 |
| 1 | (Hungary) Dávid Dombó | 12 | 1 | 1 | 2 |
| 50 | (Hungary) Márton Czuczi | | | | |
| Totals | | | 7 | 4 | 11 |
