= 2014–15 Budapest Honvéd FC season =

Budapest Honvéd FC
2014–15 season
- Chairman: George Hemingway
- Manager: Pietro Vierchowod
Home colours	Away colours

The 2014–15 season will be Budapest Honvéd FC's 104th competitive season, 10th consecutive season in the OTP Bank Liga and 105th year in existence as a football club.

== First team squad ==
Note: Flags indicate national team as defined under FIFA eligibility rules; some limited exceptions apply. Players may hold more than one non-FIFA nationality.

No.	Pos.	Nation	Player
3	DF	ALB	Kristi Marku
4	MF	ITA	Andrea Mancini
5	DF	SRB	Aleksandar Ignjatović
8	MF	NGR	George Ikenne
9	FW	HUN	Gergely Bobál
17	MF	HUN	Dániel Prosser
20	MF	PAN	Anibal Godoy
21	DF	HUN	János Fejes
22	MF	HUN	Valér Kapacina
25	MF	HUN	Dániel Gazdag
26	MF	HUN	Patrik Hidi
28	DF	HUN	Richárd Czár

No.	Pos.	Nation	Player
30	MF	HUN	Bálint Vécsei
36	DF	HUN	Botond Baráth
38	FW	HUN	Márk Koszta
57	FW	SRB	Filip Holender
66	DF	SRB	Jevrem Kosnić (loan from Palermo)
71	GK	HUN	Szabolcs Kemenes
77	MF	HUN	Gergő Nagy
88	DF	MNE	Marko Vidović
92	DF	PAN	Aníbal Mello
94	MF	HUN	Sebestyén Ihrig-Farkas
99	FW	GUI	Souleymane Youla

== Transfers ==
=== Summer ===
In: Note: Flags indicate national team as defined under FIFA eligibility rules; some limited exceptions apply. Players may hold more than one non-FIFA nationality.

No.	Pos.	Nation	Player
1	GK	HUN	András Horváth (from Hatvan)
3	DF	ALB	Kristi Marku (from Honvéd II)
6	MF	ESP	Cristian Portilla (from (United States) Indy Eleven)
15	FW	CIV	Kandia Traoré (from (France) Caen)
21	DF	HUN	János Fejes (loan return from Gyirmót)
66	DF	SRB	Jevrem Kosnić (loan from (Italy) Palermo)
67	DF	ROU	Anatolis Sundas (from Honvéd II)
88	DF	MNE	Marko Vidović (from (Moldova) Tiraspol)
94	MF	HUN	Sebestyén Ihrig-Farkas (from (Italy) Parma)
99	FW	GUI	Souleymane Youla (from (Belgium) Tournai)

Out: Note: Flags indicate national team as defined under FIFA eligibility rules; some limited exceptions apply. Players may hold more than one non-FIFA nationality.

No.	Pos.	Nation	Player
2	DF	HUN	Dávid Bobál (loan to Sopron)
5	DF	HUN	Endre Botka (loan to Kecskemét)
6	DF	HUN	János Kovács (to Siófok)
7	MF	HUN	Richárd Vernes (to (Australia) Central Coast)
9	FW	HUN	Gergely Délczeg (loan to Zalaegerszeg)
9	FW	COL	Edixon Perea
13	DF	HUN	Gyula Csemer (loan to Gyirmót)
14	FW	GHA	Emmanuel Mensah (loan to (Slovakia) Bodva)
16	MF	HUN	Mihály Csábi (loan to Sopron)
16	FW	HUN	Krisztián Nagy (loan to Kozármisleny)
17	FW	HUN	László Erdélyi (loan to Sopron)
18	MF	HUN	Attila Lőrinczy (loan to Békéscsaba)
23	FW	HUN	Bence Daru (loan to Siófok)
23	FW	ITA	Emanuele Testardi (loan return to Sampdoria)
24	MF	MLI	Drissa Diarra (to (Switzerland) Chiasso)
25	DF	CRO	Ivan Lovrić (to Kecskemét)
28	FW	ITA	Emiliano Bonazzoli (to (Italy) Este)
29	FW	HUN	Richárd Kozma (loan to Siófok)
31	GK	HUN	Márton Czuczi (loan to Békéscsaba)
32	DF	HUN	Máté Varga (loan to Cigánd)
33	MF	SRB	Boris Živanović (to Nyíregyháza)
34	GK	HUN	Norbert Szemerédi (loan to Paks)
37	FW	ITA	Arturo Lupoli (loan return to (Italy) Varese)
46	DF	HUN	Kristóf Polyák (to Zalaegerszeg)
92	FW	HUN	Roland Vólent (loan to Békéscsaba)
—	FW	SRB	Nikola Pantović (loan to Mezőkövesd)

=== Winter ===
In: Note: Flags indicate national team as defined under FIFA eligibility rules; some limited exceptions apply. Players may hold more than one non-FIFA nationality.

No.	Pos.	Nation	Player
—	FW	SRB	Bratislav Punoševac (from (Serbia) Radnički Niš)
—	MF	VEN	Jesús Meza (from (Greece) Olympiacos Volos)
—	FW	ARG	Lucas Ontivero (loan from (Turkey) Galatasaray)
—	DF	HUN	Bence Daru (loan return from Siófok)
—	DF	HUN	Endre Botka (loan return from Kecskemét)
—	GK	HUN	Márton Czuczi (loan return from Békéscsaba)
—	MF	HUN	Attila Lőrinczy (loan return from Békéscsaba)
—	DF	HUN	Dávid Bobál (loan return from Sopron)

Out: Note: Flags indicate national team as defined under FIFA eligibility rules; some limited exceptions apply. Players may hold more than one non-FIFA nationality.

No.	Pos.	Nation	Player
6	MF	ESP	Cristian Portilla
9	FW	HUN	Gergely Bobál (loan to Gyirmót)
13	DF	ITA	Raffaele Alcibiade (loan to Haladás)
15	FW	CIV	Kandia Traoré
21	DF	HUN	János Fejes (loan to Gyirmót)
22	MF	HUN	Valér Kapacina (loan to Sopron)
41	MF	CMR	Thomas Job
67	DF	ROU	Anatolis Sundas (to (Italy) Fidelis Andria)

- List of Hungarian football transfers summer 2014
- List of Hungarian football transfers winter 2014–15

== Statistics ==
=== Appearances and goals ===
Last updated on 6 December 2014.

No.	Pos	Nat	Player	Total		OTP Bank Liga		Magyar Kupa		Ligakupa	
No.	Pos	Nat	Player	Apps	Goals	Apps	Goals	Apps	Goals	Apps	Goals
3	DF	(Albania) ALB	Kristi Marku	10	1	7	0	2	0	1	1
4	MF	(Italy) ITA	Andrea Mancini	7	2	2	0	3	0	2	2
5	DF	(Serbia) SRB	Aleksandar Ignjatović	18	0	12	0	4	0	2	0
8	MF	(Nigeria) NGR	George Ikenne	19	0	14	0	2	0	3	0
9	FW	(Hungary) HUN	Gergely Bobál	13	5	6	0	3	0	4	5
17	MF	(Hungary) HUN	Dániel Prosser	15	2	11	0	3	2	1	0
20	MF	(Panama) PAN	Anibal Godoy	14	0	9	0	3	0	2	0
21	DF	(Hungary) HUN	János Fejes	9	0	4	0	0	0	5	0
22	MF	(Hungary) HUN	Valér Kapacina	4	0	1	0	2	0	1	0
25	MF	(Hungary) HUN	Dániel Gazdag	7	2	3	0	1	1	3	1
26	MF	(Hungary) HUN	Patrik Hidi	23	3	17	2	4	1	2	0
28	DF	(Hungary) HUN	Richárd Czár	11	1	7	0	0	0	4	1
30	MF	(Hungary) HUN	Bálint Vécsei	18	0	15	0	1	0	2	0
36	DF	(Hungary) HUN	Botond Baráth	18	2	12	1	3	1	3	0
38	MF	(Hungary) HUN	Márk Koszta	6	0	1	0	0	0	5	0
57	FW	(Serbia) SRB	Filip Holender	15	1	11	1	2	0	2	0
66	DF	(Serbia) SRB	Jevrem Kosnić	10	0	7	0	0	0	3	0
71	GK	(Hungary) HUN	Szabolcs Kemenes	23	-23	17	-22	4	-1	2	0
77	MF	(Hungary) HUN	Gergő Nagy	14	0	9	0	2	0	3	0
88	DF	(Montenegro) MNE	Marko Vidović	9	0	7	0	1	0	1	0
92	DF	(Panama) PAN	Aníbal Mello	5	0	1	0	1	0	3	0
94	MF	(Hungary) HUN	Sebestyén Ihrig-Farkas	3	1	1	0	0	0	2	1
99	FW	(Guinea) GUI	Souleymane Youla	20	8	17	5	2	0	1	3
Youth players:
1	GK	(Hungary) HUN	András Horváth	3	-7	0	0	0	0	3	-7
1	GK	(Romania) ROU	Relu Stoian	1	-5	0	0	0	0	1	-5
4	MF	(Hungary) HUN	Imre Fehér	1	0	0	0	0	0	1	0
5	DF	(Hungary) HUN	Péter Dékány	2	0	0	0	0	0	2	0
5	MF	(Hungary) HUN	Dominik Rózsahegyi	2	0	0	0	0	0	2	0
11	MF	(Hungary) HUN	Péter Karacs	3	0	0	0	0	0	3	0
14	FW	(Hungary) HUN	Ákos Bíró	2	1	0	0	0	0	2	1
17	MF	(Romania) ROU	Andrei Ionescu	2	0	0	0	0	0	2	0
17	MF	(Ivory Coast) CIV	Donald Bendé	1	0	0	0	0	0	1	0
18	MF	(Hungary) HUN	Gábor Erdős	1	0	0	0	0	0	1	0
35	MF	(Hungary) HUN	Benjámin Tóth	1	0	0	0	0	0	1	0
50	MF	(Hungary) HUN	Zsolt Mátyás	1	0	0	0	0	0	1	0
60	FW	(Hungary) HUN	Krisztián Szabados	4	2	0	0	1	0	3	2
Out to Loan:
13	DF	(Italy) ITA	Raffaele Alcibiade	19	2	13	1	4	1	2	0
Players no longer at the club:
6	MF	(Spain) ESP	Cristian Portilla	14	1	9	1	3	0	2	0
15	FW	(Ivory Coast) CIV	Kandia Traoré	15	2	11	1	2	0	2	1
41	MF	(Cameroon) CMR	Thomas Job	16	0	11	0	2	0	3	0
67	DF	(Romania) ROU	Anatolis Sundas	5	0	1	0	1	0	3	0

=== Top scorers ===
Includes all competitive matches. The list is sorted by shirt number when total goals are equal.

Last updated on 6 December 2014

Position	Nation	Number	Name	OTP Bank Liga	Hungarian Cup	League Cup	Total
1	(Guinea)	99	Souleymane Youla	5	0	3	8
2	(Hungary)	9	Gergely Bobál	0	0	5	5
3	(Hungary)	23	Patrik Hidi	2	1	0	3
4	(Italy)	13	Raffaele Alcibiade	1	1	0	2
5	(Hungary)	36	Botond Baráth	1	1	0	2
6	(Ivory Coast)	15	Kandia Traoré	1	0	1	2
7	(Hungary)	17	Dániel Prosser	0	2	0	2
8	(Hungary)	25	Dániel Gazdag	0	1	1	2
9	(Hungary)	60	Krisztián Szabados	0	0	2	2
10	(Italy)	4	Andrea Mancini	0	0	2	2
11	(Serbia)	57	Filip Holender	1	0	0	1
12	(Spain)	6	Cristian Portilla	1	0	0	1
13	(Hungary)	14	Ákos Bíró	0	0	1	1
14	(Hungary)	94	Sebestyén Ihrig-Farkas	0	0	1	1
15	(Albania)	3	Kristi Marku	0	0	1	1
16	(Hungary)	28	Richárd Czár	0	0	1	1
/	/	/	Own Goals	0	0	0	0
			TOTALS	12	6	19	37

=== Disciplinary record ===
Includes all competitive matches. Players with 1 card or more included only.

Last updated on 6 December 2014

Position	Nation	Number	Name	OTP Bank Liga		Hungarian Cup		League Cup		Total (Hu Total)	
Position	Nation	Number	Name	Yellow card	Red card	Yellow card	Red card	Yellow card	Red card	Yellow card	Red card
DF	(Albania)	3	Kristi Marku	4	0	1	0	0	1	5 (4)	1 (0)
MF	(Italy)	4	Andrea Mancini	0	0	1	0	0	0	1 (0)	0 (0)
DF	(Serbia)	5	Aleksandar Ignjatović	1	1	1	0	1	0	3 (1)	1 (1)
MF	(Spain)	6	Cristian Portilla	2	0	0	0	0	0	2 (2)	0 (0)
MF	(Nigeria)	8	George Ikenne	5	0	0	0	1	0	6 (5)	0 (0)
DF	(Italy)	13	Raffaele Alcibiade	4	2	2	0	0	0	6 (4)	2 (2)
FW	(Ivory Coast)	15	Kandia Traoré	1	0	0	0	0	0	1 (1)	0 (0)
MF	(Hungary)	17	Dániel Prosser	1	0	0	0	0	0	1 (1)	0 (0)
MF	(Romania)	17	Andrei Ionescu	0	0	0	0	1	0	1 (0)	0 (0)
MF	(Panama)	20	Anibal Godoy	5	0	1	0	0	0	6 (5)	0 (0)
DF	(Hungary)	21	János Fejes	1	0	0	0	0	0	1 (1)	0 (0)
MF	(Hungary)	25	Dániel Gazdag	1	0	0	0	0	0	1 (1)	0 (0)
MF	(Hungary)	26	Patrik Hidi	3	0	1	0	0	0	4 (3)	0 (0)
DF	(Hungary)	28	Richárd Czár	1	0	0	0	0	0	1 (1)	0 (0)
MF	(Hungary)	30	Bálint Vécsei	3	0	0	0	0	0	3 (3)	0 (0)
DF	(Hungary)	36	Botond Baráth	0	0	1	0	0	0	1 (0)	0 (0)
MF	(Cameroon)	41	Thomas Job	3	0	1	0	0	0	4 (3)	0 (0)
FW	(Serbia)	57	Filip Holender	4	0	0	0	1	0	5 (4)	0 (0)
DF	(Serbia)	66	Jevrem Kosnić	0	0	0	0	1	0	1 (0)	0 (0)
DF	(Montenegro)	88	Marko Vidović	2	0	1	0	0	0	3 (2)	0 (0)
DF	(Panama)	92	Aníbal Mello	1	0	0	0	2	0	3 (1)	0 (0)
FW	(Guinea)	99	Souleymane Youla	1	0	1	0	0	0	2 (1)	0 (0)
			TOTALS	43	3	11	0	7	1	61 (43)	4 (3)

=== Overall ===
Games played	27 (17 OTP Bank Liga, 4 Hungarian Cup and 6 Hungarian League Cup)
Games won	10 (3 OTP Bank Liga, 3 Hungarian Cup and 4 Hungarian League Cup)
Games drawn	6 (4 OTP Bank Liga, 1 Hungarian Cup and 1 Hungarian League Cup)
Games lost	11 (10 OTP Bank Liga, 0 Hungarian Cup and 1 Hungarian League Cup)
Goals scored	37
Goals conceded	35
Goal difference	+2
Yellow cards	61
Red cards	4
Worst discipline	(Italy) Raffaele Alcibiade (6 (yellow card) , 2 (red card) )
Best result	7–3 (H) v Csákvár - Ligakupa - 16-09-2014
Best result	4–0 (H) v Gyirmót - Ligakupa - 08-10-2014
Worst result	0–4 (A) v Debrecen - OTP Bank Liga - 04-10-2014
Most appearances	(Hungary) Patrik Hidi (23 appearances)
Most appearances	(Hungary) Szabolcs Kemenes (23 appearances)
Top scorer	(Guinea) Souleymane Youla (8 goals)
Points	36/81 (44.44%)

Last updated: 6 December 2014

== Nemzeti Bajnokság I ==
=== Matches ===
26 July 2014 1	Honvéd	3 – 0	Dunaújváros	Budapest, Pest County
16:30 CEST	Holender 75'; Youla 87'; Traoré 90+3'	Report		Stadium: Bozsik Stadion; Attendance: 1,100; Referee: (Hungary) Ádám Farkas

3 August 2014 2	Győr	3 – 1	Honvéd	Győr, Győr-Moson-Sopron County
18:30 CEST	Priskin 19'; Rudolf 76' (pen.); Pátkai 79'	Report	Youla 25'	Stadium: ETO Park; Attendance: 2,500; Referee: (Hungary) Ádám Németh

9 August 2014 3	Honvéd	0 – 1	Nyíregyháza	Budapest, Pest County
16:30 CEST		Report	Bajzát 63'	Stadium: Bozsik Stadion; Attendance: 1,020; Referee: (Hungary) Ádám Farkas

16 August 2014 4	MTK	2 – 0	Honvéd	Budapest, Pest County
18:30 CEST	Kanta 34' 53' (pen.)	Report		Stadium: Hidegkuti Nándor Stadium; Attendance: 743; Referee: (Hungary) Viktor Kassai

22 August 2014 5	Honvéd	1 – 0	Puskás	Budapest, Pest County
19:00 CEST	Alcibiade 87'	Report		Stadium: Bozsik Stadion; Attendance: 1,000; Referee: (Hungary) Tamás Bognár

30 August 2014 6	Újpest	0 – 0	Honvéd	Budapest, Pest County
16:30 CEST		Report		Stadium: Szusza Ferenc Stadium; Attendance: 3,437; Referee: (Hungary) Sándor Andó-Szabó

13 September 2014 7	Honvéd	2 – 0	Haladás	Budapest, Pest County
16:30 CEST	Portilla 13'; Hidi 43'	Report		Stadium: Bozsik Stadion; Attendance: 800; Referee: (Hungary) Ádám Németh

20 September 2014 8	Diósgyőr	2 – 1	Honvéd	Diósgyőr, Borsod-Abaúj-Zemplén County
16:30 CEST	Bognár 58' (pen.); Takács 86'	Report	Hidi 45+1'	Stadium: DVTK Stadion; Attendance: 4,806; Referee: (Hungary) Zsolt Szabó

26 September 2014 9	Honvéd	1 – 2	Pécs	Budapest, Pest County
19:00 CEST	Youla 66' (pen.)	Report	Kővári 49'; Szatmári 63'	Stadium: Bozsik Stadion; Attendance: 987; Referee: (Hungary) József Erdős

4 October 2014 10	Debrecen	4 – 0	Honvéd	Debrecen, Hajdú-Bihar County
16:00 CEST	Tisza 15'; Sidibe 38'; Vadnai 47'; Varga 61'	Report		Stadium: Nagyerdei Stadion; Attendance: 2,662; Referee: (Hungary) Ádám Németh

18 October 2014 11	Honvéd	0 – 0	Paks	Budapest, Pest County
18:00 CEST		Report		Stadium: Bozsik Stadion; Attendance: 600; Referee: (Hungary) Mihály Fábián

25 October 2014 12	Kecskemét	1 – 0	Honvéd	Kecskemét, Bács-Kiskun County
16:00 CEST	Balázs 9'	Report		Stadium: Széktói Stadion; Attendance: 983; Referee: (Hungary) Ádám Farkas

2 November 2014 13	Videoton	1 – 0	Honvéd	Székesfehérvár, Fejér County
18:30 CET	Kovács 43'	Report		Stadium: Sóstói Stadion; Attendance: 3,000; Referee: (Hungary) István Vad

7 November 2014 14	Honvéd	2 – 3	Ferencváros	Budapest, Pest County
19:00 CET	Youla 28' (pen.), 55' (pen.)	Report	Böde 47'; Lauth 48'; Lamah 90' (pen.)	Stadium: Bozsik Stadion; Attendance: 1,650; Referee: (Hungary) Fabian Mihaly

22 November 2014 15	Pápa	1 – 1	Honvéd	Pápa, Veszprém County
20:00 CET	Csizmadia 90+4' (pen.)	Report	Baráth 56'	Stadium: Perutz Stadion; Attendance: 480; Referee: (Hungary) Csaba Pintér

28 November 2014 16	Dunaújváros	0 – 0	Honvéd	Dunaújváros, Fejér County
19:00 CET		Report		Stadium: Dunaferr Arena; Attendance: 1,420; Referee: (Hungary) Zoltán Iványi

6 December 2014 17	Honvéd	0 – 2	Győr	Budapest, Pest County
14:00 CET		Report	Koltai 7' 79'	Stadium: Bozsik Stadion; Attendance: 500; Referee: (Hungary) Sándor Andó-Szabó

28 February 2015 18	Nyíregyháza Spartacus	2-0	Honvéd	Nyíregyháza, Szabolcs-Szatmár-Bereg County
16:00 CET	Abdouraman 24'; Seydi 86'	Summary	Holender (yellow card) 45' (yellow-red card); Punoševac (yellow card) 72'	Stadium: Városi Stadion; Attendance: 2,248; Referee: (Hungary) Tamás Bognár

8 March 2015 19	Honvéd	0-2	MTK Budapest	Budapest, Pest County
16:30 CET	Izazola (yellow card) 42'; Kosnić (yellow card) 44'; Botka (yellow card) 50'; Vidović (yellow card) 66'; Vécsei (yellow card) 89'	Summary	Pölöskei (yellow card) 20'; Thian (red card) 54'; Vadnai (yellow card) 60'; Kanta 64'; Csiki 68'	Stadium: Bozsik Stadion; Attendance: 500; Referee: (Hungary) Csaba Pinter

14 March 2015 20	Puskás Academy	1-1	Honvéd	Felcsút, Fejér County
16:00 CET	Zsótér (yellow card) 43'; Szélesi (yellow card) 72'; Tóth 77'	Summary	Holender (yellow card) 16'; Punoševac 38'; Ikenne (yellow card) 76'	Stadium: Pancho Arena; Attendance: 500; Referee: (Hungary) Jozsef Erdos

21 March 2015 21	Honvéd	2-2	Újpest	Budapest, Pest County
18:30 CET	Kosnić (yellow card) 19'; Hidi 33'; Prosser 52'	Summary	Hudák (yellow card) 4'; Vasiljević 20' (pen.); Andrić 42'; Balogh (yellow card) 73'	Stadium: Bozsik Stadion; Attendance: 1,536; Referee: (Hungary) Zoltan Ivanyi

5 April 2015 22	Haladás	1-3	Honvéd	Szombathely, Vas County
16:30 CET	Radó 21'	Summary	Ignjatović 14' (yellow card) 24'; Prosser (yellow card) 38' (goal) 40'; Punoševac 43'; Jean-Pierre Morgan (yellow card) 90+4'	Stadium: Rohonci Street Stadium; Attendance: 2,500; Referee: (Hungary) Peter Solymosi

11 April 2015 23	Honvéd	1-1	Diósgyőr	Budapest, Pest County
16:00 CET	Ikenne (yellow card) 15'; Hidi 31'	Summary	Marjanović 7' (yellow card) 53'; William Rocha Alves (yellow card) 26'; Koman (yellow card) 33'; Egerszegi (yellow card) 81'	Stadium: Bozsik Stadion; Attendance: 1,047; Referee: (Hungary) Sándor Andó-Szabó

18 April 2015 24	Pécsi MFC	2-1	Honvéd	Pécs, Baranya County
18:30 CET	Branko Ojdanić 85'; Makriev 87'; Pauljević (yellow card) 90+4'	Summary	Holender 71'; Hidi (yellow card) 84'; Youla (yellow card) 87'	Stadium: Stadion PMFC; Attendance: 1,657; Referee: (Hungary) Tamás Bognár

26 April 2015 25	Honvéd	1-1	Debrecen	Budapest, Pest County
18:30 CET	Holender (yellow card) 16'; Ikenne (yellow card) 22' (yellow-red card); Youla 27'; Ignjatović (yellow card) 47'; Hidi (yellow card) 88'	Summary	Lázár (yellow card) 36'; Bouadla 39'; Ludánszki (yellow card) 46' (yellow-red card); Bódi (yellow card) 74'; Jovanović (yellow card) 81'	Stadium: Bozsik Stadion; Attendance: 1,042; Referee: (Hungary) István Vad

1 May 2015 26	Paksi SE	0-0	Honvéd	Paks, Pest County
19:00 CET	Gévay (yellow card) 74'	Summary	Youla (yellow card) 12'; Baráth (yellow card) 30'; Ignjatović (yellow card) 42'	Stadium: Stadion PSE; Attendance: 1,155; Referee: (Hungary) Sándor Andó-Szabó

9 May 2015 27	Honvéd	2-0	Kecskemét	Budapest, Pest County
16:00 CET	Youla 30'; Holender 45'; Gazdag (yellow card) 60'	Summary	Eninful (yellow card) 72'	Stadium: Bozsik Stadion; Attendance: 1,010; Referee: (Hungary) Csaba Pinter

16 May 2015 28	Honvéd	1-1	Videoton	Budapest, Pest County
18:30 CET	Godoy (yellow card) 33'; Youla 69'; Baráth (yellow card) 72'; Gazdag (yellow card) 87'	Summary	Ivanovski 22' (yellow card) 72'; Maréval (yellow card) 90+1'; Trebotić (yellow card) 90+3'	Stadium: Bozsik Stadion; Attendance: 924; Referee: (Hungary) Ferenc Karakó

24 May 2015 29	Ferencváros	1-0	Honvéd	Budapest, Pest County
18:30 CET	Somalia 43'	Summary	Nagy (yellow card) 15'; Godoy (yellow card) 77'	Stadium: Groupama Arena; Attendance: 6,745; Referee: (Hungary) Jozsef Erdos

30 May 2015 30	Honvéd	2-0	Pápa	Budapest, Pest County
19:00 CET	Elez (red card) 22'; Ignjatović 49'; Nagy (yellow card) 50'; Youla 69'	Summary	Nagy (yellow card) 27'; Bence Jagodics (yellow card) 56'; Csilus (red card) 61'; Ranđelović (yellow card) 84'; Sluka (yellow card) 87'	Stadium: Bozsik Stadion; Attendance: 800; Referee: (Hungary) Csaba Pinter

=== Classification ===
Pos	Team	Pld	W	D	L	GF	GA	GD	Pts	Qualification or relegation
11	Pécs (R)	30	8	7	15	32	51	−19	31	Relegation to Baranya County Football League One (Note: Kecskemét, Nyíregyháza and Pécs won't be members of 2015–16 Nemzeti Bajnokság I due to licence problems)
12	Nyíregyháza (R)	30	8	6	16	33	49	−16	30	Relegation to Nemzeti Bajnokság III
13	Honvéd	30	6	10	14	26	36	−10	28	
14	Haladás	30	7	4	19	26	53	−27	25	
15	Dunaújváros (Note: Dunaújváros deducted 1 point) (R)	30	5	8	17	26	49	−23	22	Relegation to Nemzeti Bajnokság II

Source: mlsz.hu (in Hungarian)
Rules for classification: 1st points; 2nd overall wins; 3rd goal difference; 4th head-to-head points; 5th head-to-head goal difference; 6th head-to-head away goals scored; 7th fair-play points; 8th drawing of lots
(R) Relegated

=== Results summary ===
Overall								Home						Away					
Pld	W	D	L	GF	GA	GD	Pts	W	D	L	GF	GA	GD	W	D	L	GF	GA	GD
30	6	10	14	26	36	−10	28	5	5	5	18	15	+3	1	5	9	8	21	−13

Last updated: 30 May 2015.
Source: NB1

=== Results by round ===
Round	1	2	3	4	5	6	7	8	9	10	11	12	13	14	15	16	17	18	19	20	21	22	23	24	25	26	27	28	29	30
Ground	H	A	H	A	H	A	H	A	H	A	H	A	A	H	A	A	H	A	H	A	H	A	H	A	H	A	H	H	A	H
Result	W	L	L	L	W	D	W	L	L	L	D	L	L	L	D	D	L	L	L	D	D	W	D	L	D	D	W	D	L	W
Position	3	6	10	12	9	10	6	8	8	11	11	12	13	13	13	13	13	14	14	14	13	12	12	13	13	13	13	13	13	13

Updated to match(es) played on 30 May 2015. Source: Matches
A = Away; H = Home; W = Win; D = Draw; L = Loss

== Hungarian Cup ==
13 August 2014 Round 1	Csorna	0 – 2	Honvéd	Győr, Győr-Moson-Sopron County
17:00 CEST		Report	Prosser 16', 56'	Stadium: István Kocsis Sporttelep; Referee: (Hungary) Attila Molnár

9 September 2014 Round 2	Felsőtárkány	0 – 1	Honvéd	Felsőtárkány, Borsod-Abaúj-Zemplén County
15:30 CEST		Report	Hidi 23'	Stadium: Városi Sporttelep; Attendance: 650; Referee: (Hungary) Balázs Berke

23 September 2014 Round 3	BKV Előre	1 – 3	Honvéd	Budapest, Pest County
15:00 CEST	Major 14'	Report	Alcibiade 40'; Gazdag 66'; Baráth 74'	Stadium: Stadion Sport Street; Attendance: 300; Referee: (Hungary) Gábor Barna

29 October 2014 Quarter-final	Honvéd	0 – 0 (a.e.t.) (1 – 3 p)	Ferencváros	Budapest, Pest County
18:00 CET		Report		Stadium: Bozsik Stadion; Attendance: 600; Referee: (Hungary) Péter Solymosi
	Penalties
	Portilla (penalty scored); Hidi (penalty missed); Bobál (penalty missed); Kapacina (penalty missed)		Gera (penalty scored); Busai (penalty missed); Čukić (penalty scored); Nagy (penalty scored)

== League Cup ==
=== Group stage ===
2 September 2014 1	Győr	3 – 3	Honvéd	Győr, Győr-Moson-Sopron County
18:00 CEST	Dudás 10', 44' (pen.); Martínez 58'	Report	Szabados 28'; Traoré 74'; Mancini 90+3' (pen.)	Stadium: ETO Park; Attendance: 300; Referee: (Hungary) Ádám Radványi

16 September 2014 2	Honvéd	7 – 3	Csákvár	Budapest, Pest County
16:00 CEST	Bobál 11', 51', 52', 67'; Szabados 20'; Gazdag 42'; Mancini 61'	Report	Molnár 23'; Sötét 65'; Kocsis 72'	Stadium: Bozsik Stadion; Attendance: 200; Referee: (Hungary) Balázs Böcskei

8 October 2014 3	Honvéd	4 – 0	Gyirmót	Budapest, Pest County
18:00 CEST	Youla 12', 38', 68'; Bobál 34'	Report		Stadium: Bozsik Stadion; Attendance: 300; Referee: (Hungary) Zoltán J. Kovács

15 October 2014 4	Gyirmót	1 – 2	Honvéd	Győr, Győr-Moson-Sopron County
16:00 CEST	Szegi 66'	Report	Bíró 84'; Ihrig-Farkas 86'	Stadium: Stadium Ménfő Street; Attendance: 200; Referee: (Hungary) Attila Molnár

11 November 2014 5	Csákvár	5 – 2	Honvéd	Csákvár, Fejér County
19:00 CET	Horváth 12', 52'; Imrik 38'; T. Molnár 49'; Cs. Molnár 90+1' (pen.)	Report	Marku 32'; Horváth 71' (o.g.)	Stadium: Tersztyánszky Ödön Sportközpont; Attendance: 200; Referee: (Hungary) Péter Zierkelbach

19 November 2014 6	Honvéd	1 – 0	Győr	Budapest, Pest County
17:00 CET	Czár 77'	Report		Stadium: Bozsik Stadion; Attendance: 200; Referee: (Hungary) Gergely Szőts

Pos	Team	Pld	W	D	L	GF	GA	GD	Pts	Qualification	HON	GYŐ	GYI	CSÁ
1	Budapest Honvéd	6	4	1	1	19	12	+7	13	Advance to knockout phase	—	1–0	4–0	7–3
2	Győr	6	3	1	2	17	12	+5	10	Advance to knockout phase	3–3	—	1–3	4–1
3	Gyirmót	6	2	1	3	10	12	−2	7		1–2	1–4	—	4–0
4	Csákvár	6	1	1	4	13	23	−10	4		5–2	3–5	1–1	—

Source: Soccerway
Legend: Blue = home team win; Yellow = draw; Red = away team win.

=== Last 16 ===
18 February 2015 Leg 1	Diósgyőr	2-3	Honvéd	Miskolc
16:00 CET	Bacsa 36'; Gosztonyi (yellow card) 49'; Griffiths 53'	Summary	Prosser 5' (yellow card) 72'; Ignjatović 45'; Hidi 71'	Stadium: DVTK Stadion; Attendance: 1,871; Referee: (Hungary) Balazs Berke

21 February 2015 Leg 2	Honvéd	0-1 (3-3 agg.)	Diósgyőr	Budapest
14:00 CET		Summary	Bognár 20'; Husić (yellow card) 39'; Szalai (yellow card) 48'; Bacsa (yellow card) 72'; Okuka (yellow card) 76'	Stadium: Bozsik Stadion; Attendance: 500; Referee: (Hungary) Gabor Olah

=== Quarter finals ===
17 March 2015 Leg 1	Honvéd	3-0	Nyíregyháza Spartacus FC	Budapest
18:00 CET	Meza 45+9' 71' (pen.) 80'	Summary	Alex Hrabina (red card) 48'; Törtei (yellow card) 70'	Stadium: Bozsik Stadion; Referee: (Hungary) Peter Solymosi

21 April 2015 Leg 2	Nyíregyháza Spartacus FC	2-3 (2-6 agg.)	Honvéd	Nyíregyháza
18:00 CET	Rubus (yellow card) 45'; Mark Vamos 50'; Seydi (yellow card) 70'; Rezes 81' (pen.)	Summary	Gábor Erdős (yellow card) 30'; Ihrig-Farkas 41' (yellow card) 82'; Francis Koné 45+3' (pen.); Kosnić 47'	Stadium: Városi Stadion; Referee: (Hungary) Balazs Berke

=== Semi-final ===
12 May 2015 Leg 1	Ferencváros	3-0	Honvéd	Budapest
17:00 CET	Nagy 26' 50'; Ugrai 88'	Summary	Hidi (yellow card) 14'; Marku (yellow card) 65' (yellow-red card)	Stadium: Groupama Arena; Attendance: 150; Referee: (Hungary) Peter Solymosi

27 May 2015 Leg 2	Honvéd	1-0 (1-3 agg.)	Ferencváros	Budapest
17:30 CET	Jean-Pierre Morgan 78'; Elez (yellow card) 86'	Summary	Čukić (yellow card) 65'; Ugrai (yellow card) 79'; Nagy (yellow card) 86'	Stadium: Bozsik Stadion; Attendance: 100; Referee: (Hungary) Ferenc Karakó
