= Jevrem Kosnić =

Swiss-born Serbian footballer (born 1993)

Personal information
- Full name: Jevrem Kosnić
- Date of birth: 28 April 1993 (age 33)
- Place of birth: St. Gallen, Switzerland
- Height: 1.90 m (6 ft 3 in)
- Position: Centre back

Youth career
- 2010: Rad
- 2010–2011: Bežanija
- 2011–2013: Palermo

Senior career*
Years	Team	Apps	(Gls)
2010–2011	Bežanija	15	(0)
2011–2015	Palermo	0	(0)
2013–2014	→ Pisa (loan)	29	(2)
2014–2015	→ Honvéd (loan)	11	(0)
2016	Budućnost Podgorica	0	(0)
2016–2017	Reggina	34	(2)
2017–2018	Vojvodina	0	(0)
2018–2019	Universitatea Cluj	3	(0)
2019	Fidelis Andria	9	(0)
2019–2020	Taranto	2	(0)

International career
2009	Serbia U17		
- * Club domestic league appearances and goals as of 14:01, 27 January 2020 (UTC)

Jevrem Kosnić (Serbian Cyrillic: Јеврем Коснић; born 28 April 1993) is a Swiss-born Serbian footballer who most recently played as a central defender for Italian Serie D club Taranto.

Born in St. Gallen, Switzerland, Kosnić started playing in Serbia, at Rad Belgrade.
