= Anatolis Sundas =

Romanian footballer

Anatolis Alexis Sundas
Personal information
- Full name: Anatolis-Alexis Sundas
- Date of birth: 22 January 1994 (age 32)
- Place of birth: Oradea, Romania
- Height: 1.83 m (6 ft 0 in)
- Position: Defender

Team information
- Current team: Fidelis Andria

Youth career
- 2010–2014: Budapest Honvéd
- 2013: → Hellas Verona (loan)

Senior career*
Years	Team	Apps	(Gls)
2014–	Budapest Honvéd	1	(0)
dec. 2014–	→ Fidelis Andria (loan)	8	(0)
- * Club domestic league appearances and goals as of 10 May 2015

Anatolis Alexis Sundas (born 22 January 1994 in Oradea) is a Romanian football player, currently playing in Italy for Serie D side Fidelis Andria, on load from Hungarian Budapest Honvéd FC.

== Club statistics ==
Club	Season	League		Cup		League Cup		Europe		Total	
Club	Season	Apps	Goals	Apps	Goals	Apps	Goals	Apps	Goals	Apps	Goals
Honvéd
Honvéd	2013–14	0	0	0	0	2	0	0	0	2	0
Honvéd	2014–15	1	0	1	0	3	0	0	0	5	0
Honvéd	Total	1	0	1	0	5	0	0	0	7	0
Fidelis Andria
Fidelis Andria	2014–15	8	0	0	0	0	0	0	0	8	0
Fidelis Andria	Total	8	0	0	0	0	0	0	0	8	0
Career Total		9	0	1	0	8	0	0	0	15	0

Updated to games played as of 3 May 2015.
