= Azmahar Ariano =

Panamanian footballer (born 1991)

Personal information
- Full name: Azmahar Aníbal Ariano Navarro
- Date of birth: January 14, 1991 (age 35)
- Place of birth: Panama, Panama
- Height: 1.80 m (5 ft 11 in)
- Position: Centre back

Team information
- Current team: Plaza Amador

Senior career*
Years	Team	Apps	(Gls)
2011	Tauro	15	(2)
2012	Chorrillo		
2012	Sporting San Miguelito		
2013–2016	Chepo	41	(2)
2014	→ Honvéd (loan)	1	(0)
2016–2017	Árabe Unido	27	(1)
2017	→ Atlético Bucaramanga (loan)	0	(0)
2018	Patriotas	10	(0)
2019	Tauro	15	(1)
2019	Marathón	18	(0)
2020–	Plaza Amador	5	(0)

International career^{‡}
2016–	Panama	8	(1)
- * Club domestic league appearances and goals as of 16:31, 15 May 2020 (UTC) ‡ National team caps and goals as of 21:20, 17 January 2022 (UTC)

Azmahar Aníbal Ariano Navarro (born 14 January 1991) is a Panamanian footballer who plays as a centre back for C.D. Plaza Amador.

== Club career ==
Also known as Mello, Ariano played for local clubs Tauro, Sporting San Miguelito and Chepo before joining Hungarian top-tier side Honvéd in March 2014. In January 2012 he was supposed to be loaned to Colombian club Deportivo Tulúa, but the move never materialized.

He returned to Chepo during the 2015 Clausura.

== International career ==
In May 2018, he was named in Panama's preliminary 35 man squad for the 2018 World Cup in Russia. However, he did not make the final 23.

List of international goals scored by Azmahar_Ariano
Number	Date	Venue	Opponent	Score	Result	Competition
1	30 January 2022	Estadio Rommel Fernández, Panama City, Panama	Jamaica	3-1	3-2	2022 FIFA World Cup qualification

== Personal life ==
Ariano married in July 2012. and has a twin brother Adnihell Ariano, who is a footballer too and played with Panama's U20 the 2011 FIFA U-20 World Cup.
