= Tomáš Tujvel =

Slovak footballer

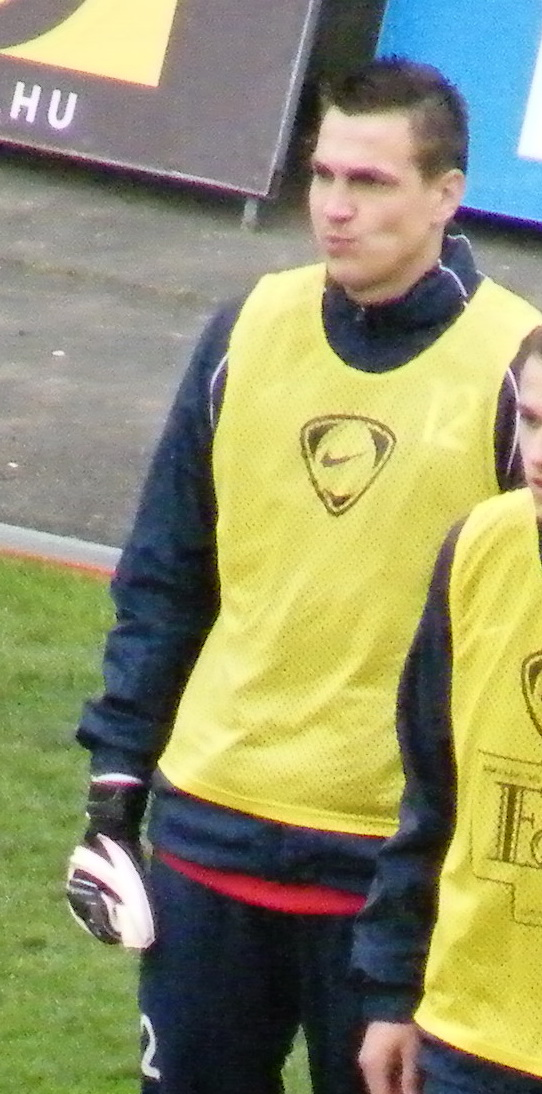

Personal information
- Full name: Tomáš Tujvel
- Date of birth: 19 September 1983 (age 43)
- Place of birth: Nitra, Czechoslovakia
- Height: 1.90 m (6 ft 3 in)
- Position: Goalkeeper

Team information
- Current team: Budapest Honvéd
- Number: 83

Youth career
- 1997–2001: Nitra

Senior career*
Years	Team	Apps	(Gls)
2001–2009	Nitra	20	(0)
2009–2016	Videoton	27	(0)
2014–2015	→ Kecskemét (loan)	30	(0)
2015–2016	→ Dunajská Streda (loan)	32	(0)
2016–2018	Mezőkövesd	39	(0)
2018–2019	Fehérvár	5	(0)
2019–	Budapest Honvéd	122	(0)
- * Club domestic league appearances and goals as of 31 May 2026

Tomáš Tujvel (born 19 September 1983) is a Slovak football goalkeeper who currently plays for Hungarian club Budapest Honvéd.

== Career ==
In July 2009, he joined Hungarian club Videoton FC.
