= Roland Baracskai =

Hungarian professional footballer

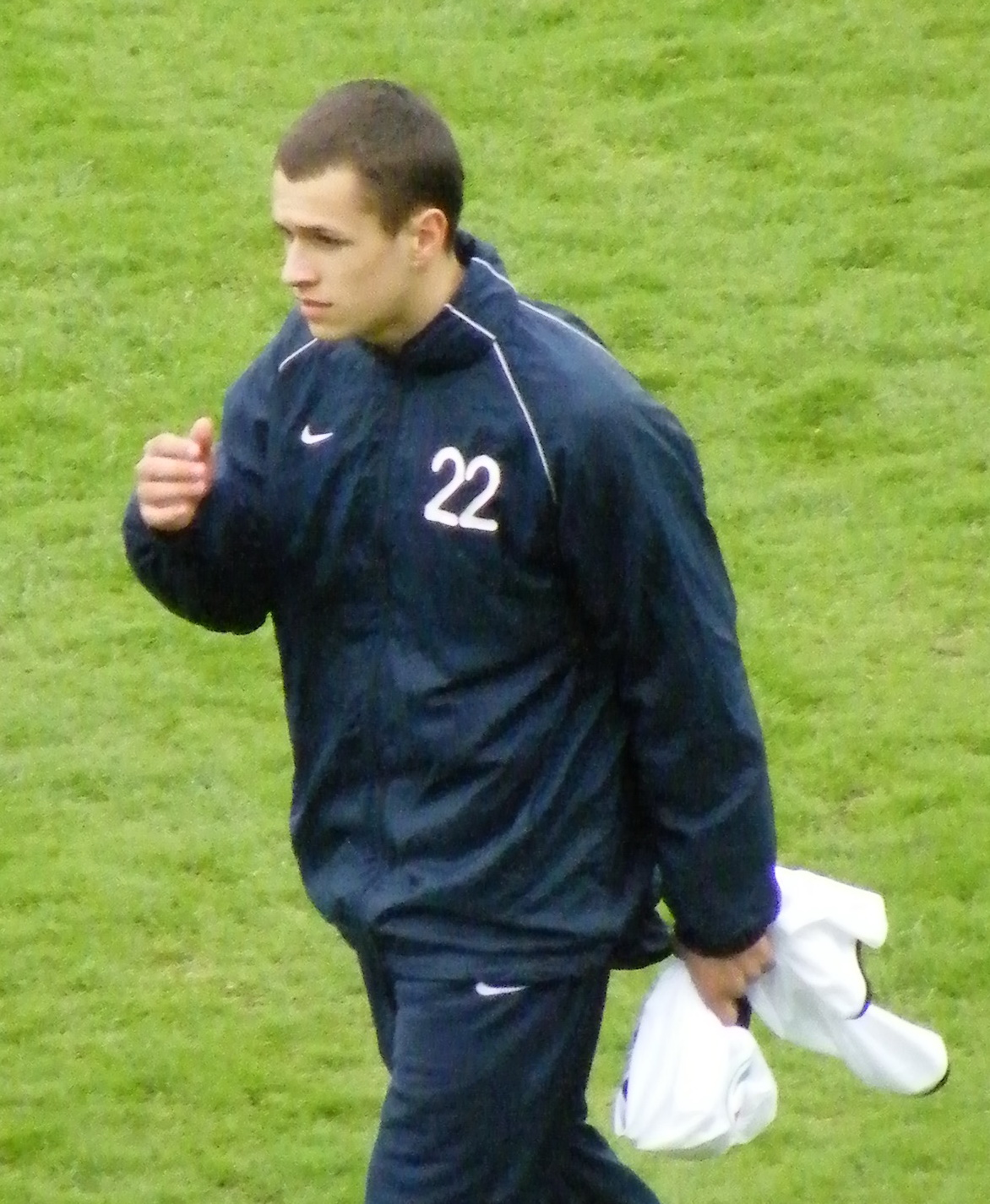

Personal information
- Date of birth: 11 April 1992 (age 34)
- Place of birth: Budapest, Hungary
- Height: 1.82 m (6 ft 0 in)
- Position: Forward

Team information
- Current team: Csákvár
- Number: 33

Youth career
- 2003–2008: Felcsút

Senior career*
Years	Team	Apps	(Gls)
2007–2008	Felcsút	1	(0)
2008–2012	Videoton	0	(0)
2008–2012	→ Videoton II	39	(5)
2012–2014	Puskás	32	(5)
2014–2019	Mezőkövesd	40	(7)
2015–2016	→ Sopron (loan)	27	(8)
2018	→ Győri ETO (loan)	10	(1)
2019–2026	Csákvár	166	(19)
2026–	Mór	0	(0)

International career
2010	Hungary U–18	1	(0)
- * Club domestic league appearances and goals as of 29 August 2026

Roland Baracskai (born 11 April 1992 in Budapest) is a Hungarian professional footballer who plays for Mór.

== Career statistics ==
Appearances and goals by club, season and competition
Club	Season	League			Cup		League Cup		Europe		Total	
Club	Season	Division	Apps	Goals	Apps	Goals	Apps	Goals	Apps	Goals	Apps	Goals
Videoton
Videoton	2008–09	Nemzeti Bajnokság I	0	0	3	1	2	0	0	0	5	1
Videoton	2009–10	Nemzeti Bajnokság I	0	0	1	1	5	0	0	0	6	1
Videoton	2010–11	Nemzeti Bajnokság I	0	0	2	0	0	0	0	0	2	0
Videoton	2011–12	Nemzeti Bajnokság I	0	0	1	0	0	0	0	0	1	0
Videoton	Total		0	0	7	2	7	0	0	0	14	2
Puskás
Puskás	2012–13	Nemzeti Bajnokság II	26	5	0	0	0	0	0	0	26	5
Puskás	2013–14	Nemzeti Bajnokság I	6	0	1	0	4	2	0	0	11	2
Puskás	Total		32	5	1	0	4	2	0	0	37	7
Sopron	2015–16	Nemzeti Bajnokság II	27	8	5	0	—		—		32	8
Mezőkövesd
Mezőkövesd	2014–15	Nemzeti Bajnokság II	28	3	3	3	5	1	—		36	7
Mezőkövesd	2016–17	Nemzeti Bajnokság I	11	2	5	2	—		—		16	4
Mezőkövesd	2017–18	Nemzeti Bajnokság I	11	2	1	1	—		—		12	3
Mezőkövesd	Total		50	7	9	6	5	1	0	0	64	14
Career total			109	20	22	8	16	3	0	0	147	31

Updated to games played as of 9 December 2017.
