= Lazar Veselinović =

Serbian footballer (born 1986)

Personal information
- Full name: Lazar Veselinović
- Date of birth: 4 August 1986 (age 40)
- Place of birth: Novi Sad, SFR Yugoslavia
- Height: 1.86 m (6 ft 1 in)
- Position: Striker

Youth career
- Vojvodina

Senior career*
Years	Team	Apps	(Gls)
2004–2005	Vojvodina	0	(0)
2004–2005	→ ČSK Čelarevo (loan)	9	(1)
2005–2006	Šajkaš Kovilj	32	(11)
2006–2008	Inđija	13	(0)
2007	→ Šajkaš Kovilj (loan)	10	(3)
2008	→ Big Bull Bačinci (loan)	11	(2)
2008–2009	Palić	24	(11)
2009–2011	Spartak Subotica	5	(0)
2010	→ ČSK Čelarevo (loan)	16	(8)
2010	→ Proleter Novi Sad (loan)	8	(1)
2011	Mladi Radnik	16	(6)
2012–2013	Hajduk Kula	42	(18)
2013	→ Dinamo Minsk (loan)	12	(3)
2014–2015	Vojvodina	27	(12)
2015	→ Pohang Steelers (loan)	16	(0)
2016	Pohang Steelers	25	(4)
2017	Mezőkövesd	22	(2)
2018	Rad	8	(1)
2018–2019	Proleter Novi Sad	0	(0)
2018–2019	→ Borac Šajkaš (loan)		
Medal record
Men's football
Representing Romania
EMF EURO
Gold medal – first place	2024 Skenderija
- * Club domestic league appearances and goals as of 21 August 2018

Lazar Veselinović (Serbian Cyrillic: Лазар Веселиновић; born 4 August 1986) is a Serbian retired footballer who played as a striker.

== Honours ==
=== Club ===
Vojvodina

- Serbian Cup: 2013–14

=== Individual ===
- Serbian SuperLiga Team of the Season: 2012–13
