= Dávid Dombó =

Hungarian footballer

Personal information
- Date of birth: 26 February 1993 (age 33)
- Place of birth: Pápa, Hungary
- Height: 1.87 m (6 ft 2 in)
- Position: Goalkeeper

Team information
- Current team: Újpest FC
- Number: 31

Youth career
- 2003–2007: Pápa
- 2007–2012: Haladás

Senior career*
| Years | Team | Apps | (Gls) |
| 2012–2014 | Haladás | 0 | (0) |
| 2012 | → Vác (loan) | 12 | (0) |
| 2014–2015 | SV Lafnitz | 13 | (0) |
| 2015–2020 | Mezőkövesd | 70 | (0) |
| 2020–2022 | Kisvárda | 73 | (0) |
| 2022–2023 | Vasas | 5 | (0) |
| 2023–2024 | Zalaegerszeg | 22 | (0) |
| 2025– | Kazincbarcika | 0 | (0) |
| 2025– | → Újpest (loan) | 1 | (0) |

International career^{‡}
| 2010–2011 | Hungary U-18 | 2 | (0) |
| 2011–2012 | Hungary U-19 | 10 | (0) |
| 2012–2013 | Hungary U-21 | 2 | (0) |
- * Club domestic league appearances and goals as of 30 May 2026 ‡ National team caps and goals as of 18 November 2013

Dávid Dombó (born 26 February 1993) is a Hungarian football player for Nemzeti Bajnokság I club Kazincbarcikai SC on loan to Újpest FC.

== Club career ==
On 16 July 2016 he was signed by Nemzeti Bajnokság I club Mezőkövesdi SE.

On 21 June 2022, Dombó signed a three-year contract with Vasas.

On 15 July 2025, Dombó signed a contract with Kazincbarcika.

== Career statistics ==
Appearances and goals by club, season and competition
| Club | Season | League | | | Cup | | Europe | | Total | |
| Club | Season | Division | Apps | Goals | Apps | Goals | Apps | Goals | Apps | Goals |
|---|---|---|---|---|---|---|---|---|---|---|
| Vác | 2012–13 | Nemzeti Bajnokság II | 12 | 0 | 3 | 0 | — | | 15 | 0 |
| Lafnitz | 2014–15 | Austrian Regionalliga | 13 | 0 | 1 | 0 | — | | 14 | 0 |
Mezőkövesd
| Mezőkövesd | 2014–15 | Nemzeti Bajnokság II | 2 | 0 | 0 | 0 | — | | 2 | 0 |
| Mezőkövesd | 2015–16 | Nemzeti Bajnokság II | 29 | 0 | 0 | 0 | — | | 29 | 0 |
| Mezőkövesd | 2016–17 | Nemzeti Bajnokság I | 9 | 0 | 3 | 0 | — | | 12 | 0 |
| Mezőkövesd | 2017–18 | Nemzeti Bajnokság I | 18 | 0 | 2 | 0 | — | | 20 | 0 |
| Mezőkövesd | 2018–19 | Nemzeti Bajnokság I | 12 | 0 | 5 | 0 | — | | 17 | 0 |
| Mezőkövesd | 2019–20 | Nemzeti Bajnokság I | 0 | 0 | 2 | 0 | — | | 2 | 0 |
| Mezőkövesd | Total | | 70 | 0 | 12 | 0 | 0 | 0 | 82 | 0 |
Kisvárda
| Kisvárda | 2019–20 | Nemzeti Bajnokság I | 16 | 0 | 0 | 0 | — | | 16 | 0 |
| Kisvárda | 2020–21 | Nemzeti Bajnokság I | 30 | 0 | 3 | 0 | — | | 33 | 0 |
| Kisvárda | Total | | 46 | 0 | 3 | 0 | 0 | 0 | 49 | 0 |
| Kazincbarcika | 2025–26 | Nemzeti Bajnokság I | 0 | 0 | 0 | 0 | — | | 0 | 0 |
| Career total | | | 141 | 0 | 19 | 0 | 0 | 0 | 160 | 0 |

Updated to games played as of 15 May 2021.
