= Gergő Gohér =

Hungarian footballer

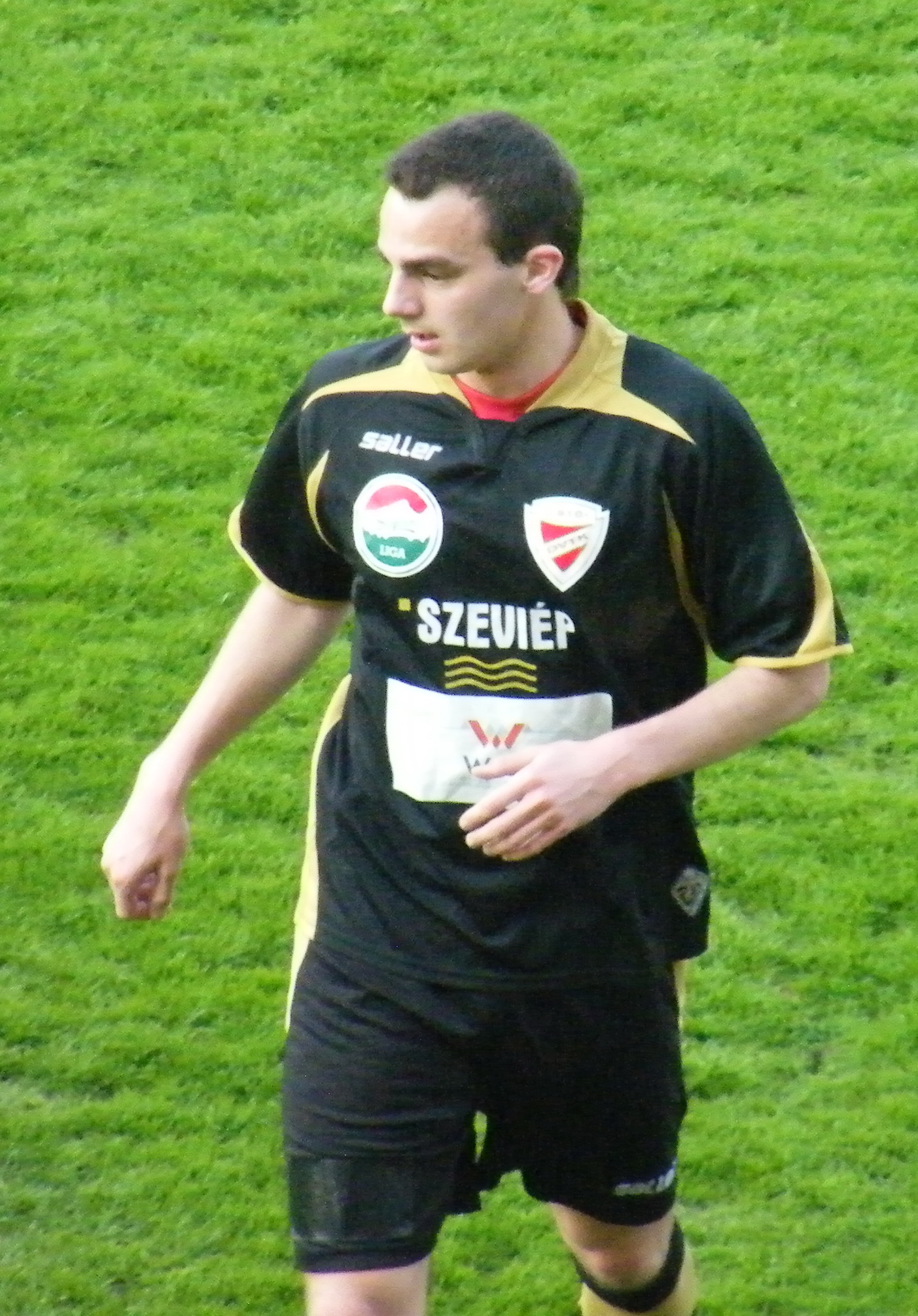

Personal information
- Date of birth: 16 June 1987 (age 39)
- Place of birth: Hatvan, Hungary
- Height: 1.82 m (6 ft 0 in)
- Position: Defender

Team information
- Current team: Szolnok
- Number: 3

Youth career
- 2001–2006: Ferencváros
- 2002: → III. Kerület (loan)
- 2003: → Szent István (loan)

Senior career*
Years	Team	Apps	(Gls)
2006	Gyöngyös	3	(3)
2006–2008	Szolnok	48	(6)
2008–2014	Diósgyőr	138	(7)
2010	→ Honvéd (loan)	1	(0)
2014–2015	Puskás Akadémia	11	(1)
2015–2016	Soroksár	40	(6)
2016–2018	Mezőkövesd	26	(4)
2018–2020	Budafok	31	(3)
2020–2021	Gyöngyös	31	(2)
2021–	Szolnok	21	(0)
- * Club domestic league appearances and goals as of 8 May 2022

Gergő Gohér (born 16 June 1987) is a Hungarian footballer who plays for Szolnok.

== Club career ==
In July 2021, Gohér returned to Szolnok.

== Career statistics ==
Appearances and goals by club, season and competition
Club	Season	League			Cup		League Cup		Europe		Total	
Club	Season	Division	Apps	Goals	Apps	Goals	Apps	Goals	Apps	Goals	Apps	Goals
Gyöngyös	2005–06	Nemzeti Bajnokság III	3	3	0	0	—		—		3	3
Szolnok
Szolnok	2006–07	Nemzeti Bajnokság II	19	4	0	0	—		—		19	4
Szolnok	2007–08	Nemzeti Bajnokság II	29	2	0	0	—		—		29	2
Szolnok	Total		48	6	0	0	0	0	0	0	48	6
Budapest Honvéd	2009–10	Nemzeti Bajnokság I	1	0	0	0	6	0	—		7	0
Diósgyőr
Diósgyőr	2008–09	Nemzeti Bajnokság I	25	0	1	0	8	0	—		34	0
Diósgyőr	2009–10	Nemzeti Bajnokság I	11	0	4	0	5	2	—		20	2
Diósgyőr	2010–11	Nemzeti Bajnokság II	30	2	1	0	—		—		31	2
Diósgyőr	2011–12	Nemzeti Bajnokság I	24	1	4	0	7	0	—		35	1
Diósgyőr	2012–13	Nemzeti Bajnokság I	29	2	2	0	5	1	—		36	3
Diósgyőr	2013–14	Nemzeti Bajnokság I	19	2	3	0	6	0	—		28	2
Diósgyőr	Total		138	7	15	0	31	3	0	0	184	10
Puskás Akadémia	2014–15	Nemzeti Bajnokság I	11	1	2	0	5	0	—		18	1
Soroksár
Soroksár	2014–15	Nemzeti Bajnokság II	15	2	0	0	—		—		15	2
Soroksár	2015–16	Nemzeti Bajnokság II	25	4	2	0	—		—		27	4
Soroksár	Total		40	6	2	0	0	0	0	0	42	6
Mezőkövesd
Mezőkövesd	2016–17	Nemzeti Bajnokság I	22	3	4	0	—		—		26	3
Mezőkövesd	2017–18	Nemzeti Bajnokság I	4	1	0	0	—		—		4	1
Mezőkövesd	Total		26	4	4	0	0	0	0	0	30	4
Budafok
Budafok	2018–19	Nemzeti Bajnokság II	18	2	2	0	—		—		20	2
Budafok	2019–20	Nemzeti Bajnokság II	13	1	2	2	—		—		15	3
Budafok	Total		31	3	4	2	0	0	0	0	35	5
Career total			298	30	27	2	42	3	0	0	367	35

Updated to games played as of 30 June 2020.

== Honours ==
Szolnoki MÁV FC

- Hungarian National Championship II: Runners-up: 2007–08

Diósgyőri VTK

- Hungarian National Championship II (1): Winner: 2010–11
- Hungarian League Cup (1): 2013–14
