= Marek Střeštík =

Czech footballer

Personal information
- Full name: Marek Střeštík
- Date of birth: 1 February 1987 (age 39)
- Place of birth: Komárno, Czechoslovakia
- Height: 1.88 m (6 ft 2 in)
- Position: Attacking midfielder

Team information
- Current team: SV Waidhofen/Thaya
- Number: 10

Youth career
- 1996–2001: Komárno
- 2001–2003: Dubnica
- 2003–2004: Synot
- 2005: Slovan Liberec

Senior career*
Years	Team	Apps	(Gls)
2005–2012	Zbrojovka Brno	76	(12)
2009	→ Sparta Prague (loan)	5	(0)
2011–2012	→ Győr (loan)	10	(1)
2012–2015	Győr	54	(9)
2015–2016	MTK Budapest	22	(5)
2016–2018	Mezőkövesd	50	(7)
2018	Kisvárda	4	(0)
2018–2019	Gyirmót	30	(4)
2019	Prostějov	10	(0)
2020	SV Langenrohr	1	(0)
2020–	SV Waidhofen/Thaya	0	(0)

International career
2004–2005	Slovakia U-18		
2006	Czech Republic U-19	10	(5)
2006–2007	Czech Republic U-20	11	(1)
2007–2008	Czech Republic U-21	9	(3)
2008	Czech Republic	1	(0)
- * Club domestic league appearances and goals as of 17:06, 20 July 2019 (UTC)

Marek Střeštík (born 1 February 1987) is a Czech footballer who currently plays for Austrian club SV Waidhofen/Thaya.

== Biography ==
Střeštík has a half-Czech and half-Hungarian background. His father is ethnic Czech, and his mother is Hungarian. He speaks Czech, Hungarian, and Slovak.

Střeštík joined 1. SK Prostějov ahead of the 2019–20 Czech First League and left the club at the end of 2019. In February 2020, he moved to Austrian club SV Langenrohr. On 7 May 2020, fellow league club, SV Waidhofen/Thaya, confirmed that Střeštík joined the club ahead of the 2020–21 Austrian Football Bundesliga.

== Club statistics ==
Club	Season	League		Cup		League Cup		Europe		Total	
Club	Season	Apps	Goals	Apps	Goals	Apps	Goals	Apps	Goals	Apps	Goals
Zbrojovka Brno
Zbrojovka Brno	2005–06	1	0	0	0	–	–	–	–	1	0
Zbrojovka Brno	2006–07	22	3	0	0	–	–	–	–	22	3
Zbrojovka Brno	2007–08	29	5	0	0	–	–	–	–	29	5
Zbrojovka Brno	2008–09	24	4	0	0	–	–	–	–	24	4
Zbrojovka Brno	2010–11	21	3	0	0	–	–	–	–	21	3
Zbrojovka Brno	Total	97	15	0	0	0	0	0	0	97	15
Sparta Prague
Sparta Prague	2009–10	5	0	0	0	–	–	4	0	9	0
Sparta Prague	Total	5	0	0	0	0	0	4	0	9	0
Győr
Győr	2011–12	10	1	2	0	6	0	–	–	18	1
Győr	2012–13	25	3	6	2	5	1	–	–	36	6
Győr	2013–14	18	4	4	2	3	0	2	0	27	6
Győr	2014–15	11	2	3	2	–	–	0	0	14	4
Total	64	10	15	6	14	1	2	0	95	17	
MTK Budapest
MTK Budapest	2015–16	22	5	3	3	–	–	2	1	27	9
MTK Budapest	Total	22	5	3	3	0	0	2	1	27	9
Mezőkövesd
Mezőkövesd	2016–17	32	4	6	1	–	–	–	–	38	5
Mezőkövesd	2017–18	18	3	0	0	–	–	–	–	18	3
Mezőkövesd	Total	50	7	6	1	0	0	0	0	56	8
Career Total		238	37	24	10	14	1	8	1	284	49

Updated to matches played as of 9 December 2017.
