= Dominik Fótyik =

Slovak footballer (born 1990)

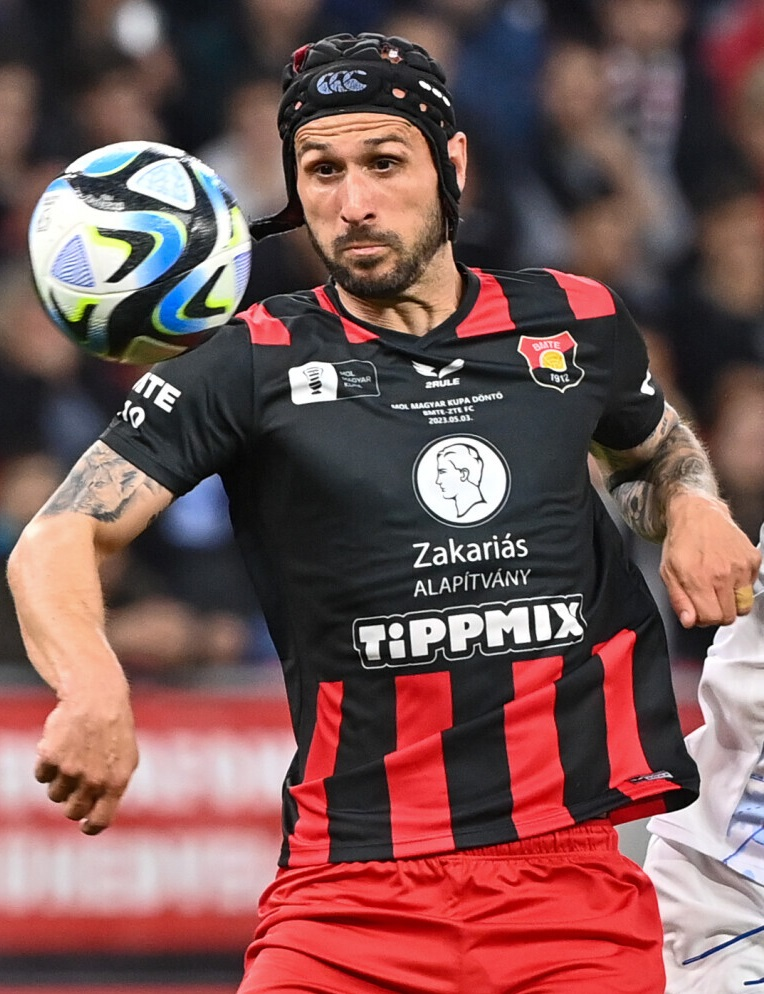
- Fótyik playing for Budafok in 2023

Personal information
- Date of birth: 16 September 1990 (age 36)
- Place of birth: Nové Zámky, Czechoslovakia
- Height: 1.84 m (6 ft 1/2 in)
- Position: Centre back

Team information
- Current team: Nové Zámky

Youth career
- 2007–2009: Nové Zámky
- 2009–2010: AS Trenčín

Senior career*
Years	Team	Apps	(Gls)
2010–2013	Žilina	15	(1)
2011	→ Zemplín Michalovce (loan)	9	(1)
2012	→ Tatran Liptovský Mikuláš (loan)	12	(2)
2012–2013	→ Kazincbarcika (loan)	28	(3)
2013–2018	Mezőkövesd	64	(4)
2014–2015	→ Kecskemét (loan)	14	(0)
2018–2021	Kazincbarcika	96	(12)
2021–2024	Budafok	95	(6)
2024–	Nové Zámky		

International career
2010–2011	Slovakia U21	2	(0)
- * Club domestic league appearances and goals as of 3 March 2024

Dominik Fótyik (born 16 September 1990) is a Slovak football defender of Hungarian ethnicity who plays for Nové Zámky.

== Career ==
He began his career as centre back or left back, later played as striker and currently plays again as central defender.

=== MFK Zemplín Michalovce ===
In July 2011, he joined Slovak club MFK Zemplín Michalovce on a one-year loan from MŠK Žilina. He made his debut for MFK Zemplín Michalovce against FK LAFC Lučenec on 23 July 2011.

=== Budafok ===
On 12 June 2021, Fótyik signed with Budafok.

== Club statistics ==
Club	Season	League		Cup		League Cup		Europe		Total	
Club	Season	Apps	Goals	Apps	Goals	Apps	Goals	Apps	Goals	Apps	Goals
Žilina
Žilina	2009–10	3	0	0	0	–	–	0	0	3	0
Žilina	2010–11	12	1	4	0	–	–	2	0	18	1
Žilina	Total	15	1	4	0	0	0	2	0	21	1
Michalovce
Michalovce	2011–12	9	1	0	0	–	–	–	–	9	1
Michalovce	Total	9	1	0	0	0	0	0	0	9	1
Liptovský Mikuláš
Liptovský Mikuláš	2011–12	12	2	0	0	–	–	–	–	12	2
Liptovský Mikuláš	Total	12	2	0	0	0	0	0	0	12	2
Kazincbarcika
Kazincbarcika	2012–13	28	3	2	0	–	–	–	–	30	3
Kazincbarcika	Total	28	3	2	0	0	0	0	0	30	3
Kecskemét
Kecskemét	2014–15	15	0	1	0	4	0	–	–	20	0
Kecskemét	Total	15	0	1	0	4	0	0	0	20	0
Mezőkövesd
Mezőkövesd	2013–14	20	0	2	0	5	2	–	–	27	2
Mezőkövesd	2015–16	28	3	1	0	–	–	–	–	29	3
Mezőkövesd	2016–17	11	0	2	0	–	–	–	–	13	0
Mezőkövesd	2017–18	5	1	2	0	–	–	–	–	7	1
Mezőkövesd	Total	64	4	7	0	5	2	0	0	76	6
Career Total		143	11	14	0	9	2	2	0	168	13

Updated to games played as of 9 December 2017.
