= Dániel Vadnai =

Hungarian footballer

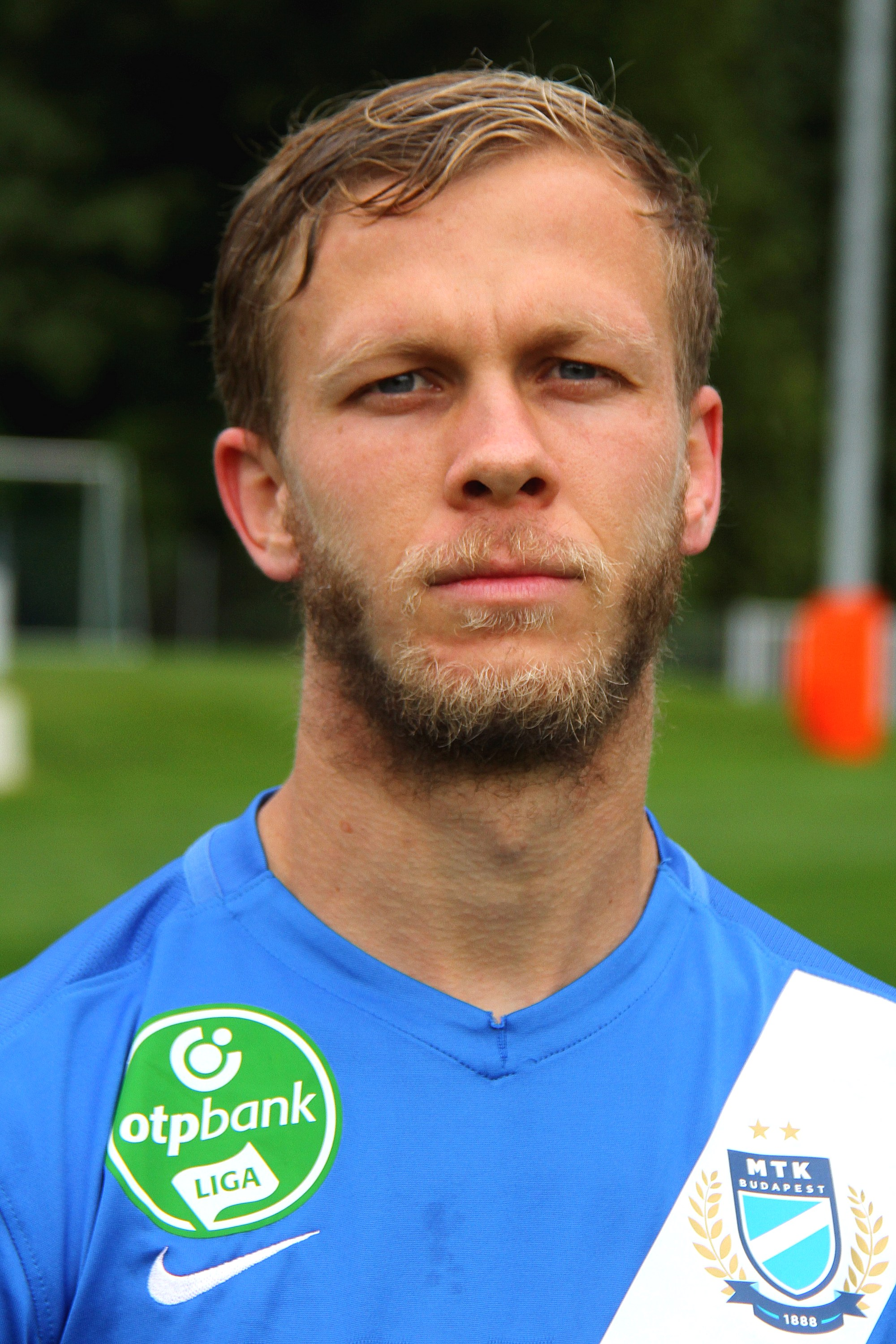
- Vadnai with MTK Budapest in 2016

Personal information
- Date of birth: 19 February 1988 (age 38)
- Place of birth: Budapest, Hungary
- Height: 1.77 m (5 ft 9 1/2 in)
- Position: Left back

Team information
- Current team: Dorog
- Number: 71

Youth career
- 2003–2006: MTK Budapest

Senior career*
Years	Team	Apps	(Gls)
2006–2013	MTK Budapest	103	(2)
2013–2015	Debrecen	29	(3)
2015–2017	MTK Budapest	70	(2)
2017–2023	Mezőkövesd	123	(3)
2023–2024	MTK Budapest	22	(0)
2025–	Dorog	11	(0)
- * Club domestic league appearances and goals as of 14 January 2026

Dániel Vadnai (born 19 February 1988) is a Hungarian football player who plays for MTK Budapest.

== Career ==
On 3 February 2023, Vadnai returned to MTK Budapest.

== Career statistics ==
Appearances and goals by club, season and competition
Club	Season	League			Cup		League Cup		Europe		Total	
Club	Season	Division	Apps	Goals	Apps	Goals	Apps	Goals	Apps	Goals	Apps	Goals
MTK
MTK	2006–07	Nemzeti Bajnokság I	4	0	0	0	0	0	0	0	4	0
MTK	2007–08	Nemzeti Bajnokság I	3	0	0	0	9	1	0	0	12	1
MTK	2008–09	Nemzeti Bajnokság I	8	0	4	0	1	0	0	0	13	0
MTK	2009–10	Nemzeti Bajnokság I	20	2	4	1	1	0	0	0	25	3
MTK	2010–11	Nemzeti Bajnokság I	22	0	3	0	1	0	0	0	26	0
MTK	2011–12	Nemzeti Bajnokság II	19	0	9	1	7	0	0	0	35	1
MTK	2012–13	Nemzeti Bajnokság I	27	0	1	0	4	0	1	0	33	0
MTK	2014–15	Nemzeti Bajnokság I	9	0	0	0	2	0	0	0	11	0
MTK	2015–16	Nemzeti Bajnokság I	32	1	2	0	—		2	0	36	1
MTK	2016–17	Nemzeti Bajnokság I	29	1	2	0	—		2	0	33	1
MTK	Total		173	4	25	2	25	1	5	0	228	7
Debrecen
Debrecen	2013–14	Nemzeti Bajnokság I	18	2	4	0	6	0	0	0	28	2
Debrecen	2014–15	Nemzeti Bajnokság I	11	1	3	0	5	0	2	0	21	1
Debrecen	Total		29	3	7	0	11	0	2	0	49	3
Mezőkövesd
Mezőkövesd	2017–18	Nemzeti Bajnokság I	27	0	1	0	—		—		28	0
Mezőkövesd	2018–19	Nemzeti Bajnokság I	26	1	3	0	—		—		29	1
Mezőkövesd	2019–20	Nemzeti Bajnokság I	22	0	7	0	—		—		29	0
Mezőkövesd	2020–21	Nemzeti Bajnokság I	22	1	4	1	—		—		26	2
Mezőkövesd	Total		97	2	15	1	0	0	0	0	112	3
Career total			299	9	47	3	36	1	7	0	389	13

Updated to games played as of 10 May 2021.

=== Debreceni VSC ===
On 16 August 2013, Vadnai signed a four-year contract with Debreceni VSC.
