= Márton Czuczi =

Hungarian footballer

Personal information
- Full name: Márton Czuczi
- Date of birth: 20 May 1992 (age 34)
- Place of birth: Budapest, Hungary
- Height: 1.93 m (6 ft 4 in)
- Position: Goalkeeper

Team information
- Current team: Dabas

Youth career
- 2003–2006: Vác
- 2006: Ferencváros
- 2006–2007: Újpest
- 2007–2009: Felcsút
- 2008: → Videoton (loan)
- 2008–2012: Budapest Honvéd

Senior career*
Years	Team	Apps	(Gls)
2011–2013	Budapest Honvéd II	22	(0)
2012–2015	Budapest Honvéd	4	(0)
2014	→ Békéscsaba (loan)	1	(0)
2015–2016	SZTK	4	(0)
2016–2017	Mezőkövesd	0	(0)
2017–2018	Pénzügyőr		
2018	Monori	2	(0)
2019	Pénzügyőr		
2019–	Dabas		
- * Club domestic league appearances and goals as of 30 July 2017

Márton Czuczi (born 20 May 1992 in Budapest) is a Hungarian football player who currently plays for FC Dabas.

== Career ==
In 2019, Czuczi returned to Pénzügyőr SE.

== Career statistics ==
Appearances and goals by club, season and competition
Club	Season	League			Cup		League Cup		Europe		Total	
Club	Season	Division	Apps	Goals	Apps	Goals	Apps	Goals	Apps	Goals	Apps	Goals
Honvéd
Honvéd	2011–12	Nemzeti Bajnokság I	0	0	2	0	0	0	0	0	2	0
Honvéd	2012–13	Nemzeti Bajnokság I	3	0	1	0	4	0	0	0	8	0
Honvéd	2013–14	Nemzeti Bajnokság I	1	0	1	0	4	0	0	0	6	0
Honvéd	Total		4	0	4	0	8	0	0	0	16	0
Career total			4	0	4	0	8	0	0	0	16	0

Updated to games played as of 27 April 2014.
