= Dávid Hudák =

Slovak footballer

Personal information
- Full name: Dávid Hudák
- Date of birth: 21 March 1993 (age 33)
- Place of birth: Bratislava, Slovakia
- Height: 1.94 m (6 ft 4 in)
- Position: Centre back

Team information
- Current team: Gyirmót
- Number: 39

Youth career
- Inter Bratislava
- 2009-2012: Slovan Bratislava

Senior career*
Years	Team	Apps	(Gls)
2012-2016	Slovan Bratislava	31	(1)
2013	→ Dunajská Streda (loan)	10	(0)
2015	→ Újpest (loan)	9	(0)
2016	→ Skalica (loan)	10	(0)
2016-2019	Mezőkövesd	61	(2)
2019-	Gyirmót	135	(10)

International career
- Slovakia U17
- Slovakia U18
- Slovakia U19
2012-2014	Slovakia U21	12	(0)
- * Club domestic league appearances and goals as of 10 June 2025

Dávid Hudák (born 21 March 1993) is a Slovak football defender who currently plays for Gyirmót FC Győr. He is ethnic Hungarian.

== ŠK Slovan Bratislava ==
He made his debut for ŠK Slovan Bratislava against MFK Košice on 22 July 2012.

== Club statistics ==
Club	Season	League		Cup		Europe		Total	
Club	Season	Apps	Goals	Apps	Goals	Apps	Goals	Apps	Goals
Slovan Bratislava
Slovan Bratislava	2012–13	3	0	1	0	0	0	4	0
Slovan Bratislava	2013–14	10	0	3	0	0	0	13	0
Slovan Bratislava	2014–15	12	0	2	0	10	0	24	0
Slovan Bratislava	2015–16	6	1	2	0	4	0	12	1
Slovan Bratislava	Total	31	1	8	0	14	0	53	1
Dunajská Streda
Dunajská Streda	2013–14	10	0	1	0	0	0	11	0
Dunajská Streda	Total	10	0	1	0	0	0	11	0
Újpest
Újpest	2014–15	9	0	1	0	–	–	10	0
Újpest	Total	9	0	1	0	0	0	10	0
Skalica
Skalica	2015–16	10	0	0	0	–	–	10	0
Skalica	Total	10	0	0	0	0	0	10	0
Mezőkövesd
Mezőkövesd	2016–17	30	1	5	1	–	–	35	2
Mezőkövesd	2017–18	28	1	1	0	–	–	29	1
Mezőkövesd	2018–19	3	0	6	0	–	–	9	0
Mezőkövesd	Total	61	2	12	1	0	0	73	3
Gyirmót
Gyirmót	2019–20	26	3	0	0	–	–	26	3
Gyirmót	2020–21	33	3	1	2	–	–	34	5
Gyirmót	2021–22	0	0	0	0	–	–	0	0
Gyirmót	Total	59	6	1	2	0	0	60	8
Career Total		180	9	23	3	14	0	227	12

Updated to games played as of 15 May 2022.
