= 2016–17 Budapest Honvéd FC season =

Honvéd
2016–17 season
- Chairman: George Hemingway
- Manager: Marco Rossi
- Stadium: Bozsik József Stadion
- Nemzeti Bajnokság I: 1st
- Magyar Kupa: Round of 16
- Top goalscorer: League: Márton Eppel (16); All: Márton Eppel (16)
- Highest home attendance: 8,500 v Videoton (27 May 2017, Nemzeti Bajnokság I)
- Lowest home attendance: 1,180 v Gyirmót (21 August 2016, Nemzeti Bajnokság I)
- Average home league attendance: 2,761
- Biggest win: 7–1 v Mórahalom (Away, 14 September 2016, Magyar Kupa)
- Biggest defeat: 0–3 v Videoton (Away, 4 March 2017, Nemzeti Bajnokság I)

The 2016–17 season was Budapest Honvéd Football Club's 103rd competitive season, 13th consecutive season in the Nemzeti Bajnokság I and 109th season in existence as a football club. In addition to the domestic league, Honvéd participated in that season's editions of the Magyar Kupa.

== Squad ==
Squad at end of season

Note: Flags indicate national team as defined under FIFA eligibility rules; some limited exceptions apply. Players may hold more than one non-FIFA nationality.

No.	Pos.	Nation	Player
2	DF	HUN	Dávid Bobál
6	MF	HUN	Dániel Gazdag
7	FW	ITA	Davide Lanzafame
8	DF	NGR	George Ikenne
9	FW	HUN	Márton Eppel
11	FW	COD	Kadima Kabangu
18	GK	HUN	András Horváth
19	FW	HUN	Márk Koszta
20	MF	HUN	Dániel Kovács
21	FW	HUN	Bálint Tömösvári
22	MF	HUN	Dániel Göblyös
23	MF	HUN	Donát Zsótér
24	MF	SRB	Đorđe Kamber
25	DF	CRO	Ivan Lovrić

No.	Pos.	Nation	Player
26	MF	HUN	Patrik Hidi
27	DF	HUN	András Márton
30	DF	ROU	Raul Palmeș
36	DF	HUN	Botond Baráth
55	FW	HUN	Dániel Lukács
57	FW	SRB	Filip Holender
66	MF	SRB	Dušan Vasiljević
77	MF	HUN	Gergő Nagy
85	GK	HUN	Csaba Somogyi
86	MF	HUN	Zsolt Laczkó
89	DF	HUN	Balázs Villám
92	FW	HUN	Zsolt Balázs
99	GK	HUN	Dávid Gróf

== Transfers ==
=== Transfers in ===
Transfer window	Pos.	No.	Player	From
Summer	FW	–	(Hungary) Henrik Tóth	(France) Espérance Aulnaysienne
Summer	FW	7	(Italy) Davide Lanzafame	(Italy) Novara
Summer	DF	38	(Hungary) Ádám Hajdú	MTK
Summer	GK	99	(Hungary) Dávid Gróf	Csákvár
Winter	GK	85	(Hungary) Csaba Somogyi	Free agent (Note: Previous club Szolnok.)
Winter	DF	89	(Hungary) Balázs Villám	Zalaegerszeg

=== Transfers out ===
Transfer window	Pos.	No.	Player	To
Summer	MF	–	(Hungary) Krisztofer Szerető	(England) Stoke City
Summer	DF	5	(Serbia) Aleksandar Ignjatović	Released
Summer	DF	14	(Romania) Loránd Szilágyi	Cigánd
Summer	FW	63	(Hungary) László Erdélyi	Sopron
Summer	FW	70	(Hungary) Richárd Jelena	Released (Note: Joined Paks.)
Summer	GK	71	(Hungary) Szabolcs Kemenes	Released (Note: Joined Paks.)
Summer	FW	96	(Romania) Dan Constantinescu	Kazincbarcika
Summer	FW	99	(Guinea) Souleymane Youla	Released (Note: Joined Indy Eleven.)
Winter	MF	–	(Hungary) Szabolcs Schön	(Netherlands) Ajax
Winter	GK	1	(Ukraine) Oleksandr Nad	Released (Note: Joined Gyirmót.)
Winter	FW	17	(Hungary) Dániel Prosser	Puskás Akadémia
Winter	DF	21	(Hungary) Endre Botka	Ferencváros

=== Loans in ===
Transfer window	Pos.	No.	Player	From	End date
Summer	MF	23	(Hungary) Donát Zsótér	(Belgium) Sint-Truidense	End of season
Summer	FW	92	(Hungary) Zsolt Balázs	Paks	End of season
Winter	MF	86	(Hungary) Zsolt Laczkó	Paks	End of season

=== Loans out ===
Transfer window	Pos.	No.	Player	To	End date
Summer	FW	–	(Hungary) György Kamarás	Balmazújváros	End of season
Summer	MF	–	(Hungary) Zsolt Mátyás	Vác	End of season
Summer	DF	–	(Hungary) Márkó Varga	Kozármisleny	End of season
Summer	FW	5	(Hungary) Gergely Bobál	Zalaegerszeg	End of season
Summer	MF	7	(Hungary) Richárd Vernes	Paks	End of season
Summer	MF	16	(Hungary) Mihály Csábi	Kozármisleny	Middle of season
Winter	DF	–	(Hungary) Imre Fehér	SZEOL	End of season
Winter	DF	38	(Hungary) Ádám Hajdú	Paks	End of season
Winter	GK	44	(Hungary) Dániel Vajda	Budaörs	End of season

== Competitions ==
=== Overview ===
Competition	First match	Last match	Starting round	Final position	Record							
Competition	First match	Last match	Starting round	Final position	Pld	W	D	L	GF	GA	GD	Win %
Nemzeti Bajnokság I	16 July 2016	27 May 2017	Matchday 1	Winners	33	20	5	8	55	30	+25	60.61
Magyar Kupa	14 September 2016	1 March 2017	Round of 128	Round of 16	5	3	0	2	19	6	+13	60.00
Total					38	23	5	10	74	36	+38	60.53

Source: Competitions

=== Nemzeti Bajnokság I ===
==== League table ====
Pos	Team	Pld	W	D	L	GF	GA	GD	Pts	Qualification or relegation
1	Honvéd (C)	33	20	5	8	55	30	+25	65	Qualification for the Champions League second qualifying round
2	Videoton	33	18	8	7	65	28	+37	62	Qualification for the Europa League first qualifying round (Note: Ferencváros qualified for the Europa League first qualifying round by winning the 2016–17 Magyar Kupa.)
3	Vasas	33	15	7	11	50	40	+10	52	Qualification for the Europa League first qualifying round
4	Ferencváros	33	14	10	9	54	44	+10	52	Qualification for the Europa League first qualifying round
5	Paks	33	11	12	10	41	37	+4	45	

Source: Hungarian Football Federation (in Hungarian), Soccerway
Rules for classification: 1) Points; 2) Matches won; 3) Goal difference; 4) Goals scored; 5) Head-to-head points; 6) Head-to-head goal difference; 7) Head-to-head away goals scored; 8) Fairplay; 9) Draw.
(C) Champions

==== Results summary ====
Overall								Home						Away					
Pld	W	D	L	GF	GA	GD	Pts	W	D	L	GF	GA	GD	W	D	L	GF	GA	GD
33	20	5	8	55	30	+25	65	12	2	2	26	9	+17	8	3	6	29	21	+8

Source: Hungarian Football Federation

==== Results by round ====
Round	1	2	3	4	5	6	7	8	9	10	11	12	13	14	15	16	17	18	19	20	21	22	23	24	25	26	27	28	29	30	31	32	33
Ground	A	H	A	A	H	A	H	A	H	A	H	H	A	H	H	A	H	A	H	A	H	A	A	H	A	A	H	A	H	A	H	A	H
Result	W	L	D	W	W	L	D	L	W	W	L	D	L	W	W	D	W	W	W	W	W	L	D	W	W	L	W	L	W	W	W	W	W
Position	2	4	6	3	3	5	5	6	5	5	5	5	5	4	4	4	4	3	2	2	1	2	2	2	1	2	1	1	1	1	1	1	1
Points	3	3	4	7	10	10	11	11	14	17	17	18	18	21	24	25	28	31	34	37	40	40	41	44	47	47	50	50	53	56	59	62	65

Source: Matches
A = Away; H = Home; W = Win; D = Draw; L = Loss

==== Matches ====
16 July 2016 1	Újpest	0–2	Honvéd	Budapest (Note: The match was played at the Illovszky Rudolf Stadion in Budapest, instead of Újpest regular stadium, the Szusza Ferenc Stadion in Budapest, due to the renovation work.)
18:00 CEST (UTC+2)	Andrić (yellow card) 18'; Kecskés (yellow card) 28'; Diarra (yellow card) 58'; Sanković (yellow card) 79'	Report	Hidi 4'; Holender (yellow card) 12'; Eppel 44'; Lovrić (yellow card) 89'	Stadium: Illovszky Rudolf Stadion; Attendance: 2,500; Referee: Zoltán Iványi; Assistant referees: István Albert, Balázs Farkas; Fourth official: Zoltán Horváth; Goal-line assistants: Ferenc Karakó, Ádám Radványi

23 July 2016 2	Honvéd	0–1	Ferencváros	Budapest
20:30 CEST (UTC+2)	Hidi (yellow card) 41'; Eppel (yellow card) 60'	Report	Gera (yellow card) 30'; Ramírez (yellow card) 32'; Böde 43'; Nalepa (yellow card) 62'; Radó (yellow card) 65'; Hüsing (yellow card) 67'; Trinks (yellow card) 90+1'	Stadium: Bozsik József Stadion; Attendance: 2,384; Referee: Viktor Kassai; Assistant referees: György Ring, István Albert; Fourth official: Dr. Zsolt Varga; Goal-line assistants: Ádám Németh, Gábor Oláh

30 July 2016 3	Haladás	1–1	Honvéd	Sopron (Note: The match was played at the Káposztás utcai Stadion in Sopron, instead of Haladás regular stadium, the Rohonci út in Szombathely, which was demolished to make way to the newly built Haladás Sportkomplexum.)
18:00 CEST (UTC+2)	Iszlai (yellow card) 15'; Hajdú 73' (o.g.)	Report	Hidi (yellow card) 4'; Bošnjak 75' (o.g.); Nagy (yellow card) 89'	Stadium: Káposztás utcai Stadion; Attendance: 1,187; Referee: István Vad; Assistant referees: Vencel Tóth II, Gergely Becséri; Fourth official: Balázs Szalai; Goal-line assistants: József Erdős, Attila Molnár

6 August 2016 4	Diósgyőr	0–3	Honvéd	Miskolc
18:00 CEST (UTC+2)	Lipták (yellow card) 47'; Nono (yellow card) 90+2'	Report	Eppel 3', 45'; Gazdag (yellow card) 64'; Koszta 90+3'	Stadium: Diósgyőri Stadion; Attendance: 3,797; Referee: Zsolt Szabó; Assistant referees: Vencel Tóth II, Róbert Horváth; Fourth official: Gábor Varga Jr. Goal-line assistants: János Takács, Tamás Nazsa

13 August 2016 5	Honvéd	3–1	Paks	Budapest
18:00 CEST (UTC+2)	Botka (yellow card) 26'; Eppel 67', 77'; Vasiljević (yellow card) 73', (goal) 78'; Vernes (yellow card) 84'	Report	Kecskés (yellow card) 13'; Hahn 16'; Lenzsér (yellow card) 45'; Gévay (yellow card) 56'; Kulcsár (red card) 75'; Kemenes (yellow card) 77'; Báló (yellow card) 81'	Stadium: Bozsik József Stadion; Attendance: 1,461; Referee: Péter Solymosi; Assistant referees: Gábor Varga Jr., Gergely Becséri; Fourth official: Balázs Szert; Goal-line assistants: Gergely Szőts, Tamás Nazsa

17 August 2016 6	Vasas	2–0	Honvéd	Budapest
19:00 CEST (UTC+2)	Berecz 28'; Ádám (yellow card) 48'; Osváth (yellow card) 70'; Remili 73'	Report	Holender (yellow card) 15'; Bobál (red card) 47'; Eppel (yellow card) 69'	Stadium: Illovszky Rudolf Stadion; Attendance: 4,375; Referee: Sándor Andó-Szabó; Assistant referees: Attila Kelemen, Balázs Szert; Fourth official: Dániel Szalai; Goal-line assistants: Ferenc Karakó, Gyöngyi Gaál

21 August 2016 7	Honvéd	0–0	Gyirmót	Budapest
18:00 CEST (UTC+2)	Botka (yellow card) 39'; Gazdag (yellow card) 72'	Report	Présinger (yellow card) 38'; Paku (yellow card) 66'	Stadium: Bozsik József Stadion; Attendance: 1,180; Referee: Szabolcs Szilasi; Assistant referees: Péter Berettyán, Arnold Kepe; Fourth official: Balázs Huszár; Goal-line assistants: Csaba Pintér, Tibor Gyarmati II

10 September 2016 8	Mezőkövesd	3–1	Honvéd	Mezőkövesd
18:00 CEST (UTC+2)	Bačelić-Grgić 29'; Střeštík 52', (yellow card) 80'; Egerszegi 88'	Report	Hidi 11', (red card) 75'; Lovrić (yellow card) 36'; Baráth (yellow card) 88'	Stadium: Városi Stadion; Attendance: 1,670; Referee: Zoltán Iványi; Assistant referees: István Albert, Balázs Buzás; Fourth official: János Medovarszki; Goal-line assistants: Gergely Szőts, Eszter Urbán

17 September 2016 9	Honvéd	5–0	MTK	Budapest
18:30 CEST (UTC+2)	Prosser 16'; Lanzafame 20'; Koszta 44'; D. Bobál 65'; G. Nagy 72'	Report	Baki (yellow card) 19'; Vogyicska (yellow card) 63'; Kanta (yellow card) 90'	Stadium: Bozsik József Stadion; Attendance: 1,465; Referee: József Erdős; Assistant referees: Georgiou Theodoros, Gábor Kormányos II; Fourth official: Gergely Becséri; Goal-line assistants: Csaba Pintér, Ádám Farkas

20 September 2016 10	Debrecen	0–1	Honvéd	Debrecen
20:00 CEST (UTC+2)	Tőzsér (yellow card) 56'	Report	Lanzafame 6'; Zsótér (yellow card) 86'	Stadium: Nagyerdei Stadion; Attendance: 1,685; Referee: István Vad; Assistant referees: Balázs Buzás, Balázs Farkas; Fourth official: János Medovarszki; Goal-line assistants: Zoltán Iványi, Róbert Nagy

24 September 2016 11	Honvéd	1–2	Videoton	Budapest
18:00 CEST (UTC+2)	Lanzafame 47', (yellow card) 66'; Baráth (yellow card) 75'	Report	Négo (yellow card) 13'; Juhász 35'; Géresi 52'; Stopira (yellow card) 81'	Stadium: Bozsik József Stadion; Attendance: 2,051; Referee: Balázs Berke; Assistant referees: Dr. Zsolt Varga, Balázs Buzás; Fourth official: Balázs Szert; Goal-line assistants: Ádám Farkas, Gyöngyi Gaál

15 October 2016 12	Honvéd	1–1	Újpest	Budapest
18:00 CEST (UTC+2)	Lanzafame 69'	Report	Lázok 52'; Bardhi (yellow card) 68'; Balogh (yellow card) 89'	Stadium: Bozsik József Stadion; Attendance: 2,713; Referee: Sándor Andó-Szabó; Assistant referees: Balázs Szert, Balázs Szalai; Fourth official: Gábor Kormányos II; Goal-line assistants: Zsolt Szabó, Katalin Kulcsár

22 October 2016 13	Ferencváros	3–2	Honvéd	Budapest
18:00 CEST (UTC+2)	Böde 26'; Čukić (yellow card) 32'; Hajnal 44'; Djuricin 60'; D. Nagy (yellow card) 77'	Report	Hajdú (yellow card) 11'; Kamber 73', (yellow card) 86'; Lanzafame 78'; Botka (yellow card) 90+3'	Stadium: Groupama Arena; Attendance: 7,072; Referee: Ferenc Karakó; Assistant referees: István Albert, János Medovarszki; Fourth official: Balázs Buzás; Goal-line assistants: Zoltán Iványi, János Takács

29 October 2016 14	Honvéd	2–1	Haladás	Budapest
15:30 CEST (UTC+2)	Lanzafame 42'; Botka (yellow card) 45'; Prosser 45'; Kamber (yellow card) 75'	Report	Gaál (yellow card) 39', (goal) 45'; Rácz (yellow card) 40'; Halmosi (yellow card) 45'; Kovács (yellow card) 62'; Wils (yellow card) 86'	Stadium: Bozsik József Stadion; Attendance: 2,832; Referee: József Erdős; Assistant referees: Balázs Farkas, Balázs Szalai; Fourth official: György Ring; Goal-line assistants: Ádám Farkas, Róbert Nagy

5 November 2016 15	Honvéd	2–0	Diósgyőr	Budapest
15:30 CET (UTC+1)	Lovrić (yellow card) 57'; Lanzafame 74', (yellow card) 80'; Koszta 84'; Baráth (yellow card) 86'; Gazdag (yellow card) 88'	Report	Daushvili (yellow card) 72'; Novothny (yellow card) 81'	Stadium: Bozsik József Stadion; Attendance: 1,575; Referee: Viktor Kassai; Assistant referees: Péter Berettyán, Balázs Szert; Fourth official: László Viszokai; Goal-line assistants: István Vad, Gyöngyi Gaál

19 November 2016 16	Paks	1–1	Honvéd	Paks
15:30 CET (UTC+1)	Szabó 8'; Gévay (yellow card) 48'; Kecskés (yellow card) 62'; Lenzsér (yellow card) 64'	Report	Szabó 45' (o.g.); Botka (yellow card) 54'; Gazdag (yellow card) 65'; Hidi (yellow card) 74'; Prosser (yellow card) 85'	Stadium: Fehérvári úti Stadion; Attendance: 1,118; Referee: Zsolt Szabó; Assistant referees: Gábor Erős, Róbert Horváth; Fourth official: Gábor Kormányos II; Goal-line assistants: János Takács, Tibor Gyarmati II

26 November 2016 17	Honvéd	2–1	Vasas	Budapest
15:30 CET (UTC+1)	Lovrić (yellow card) 33'; Holender (yellow card) 48'; Prosser 81'; Eppel 90+1'	Report	Remili (yellow card) 35'; Burmeister (yellow card) 61'; Pavlov 71', (yellow card) 82'; Ristevski (yellow card) 90'	Stadium: Bozsik József Stadion; Attendance: 2,908; Referee: Zoltán Iványi; Assistant referees: Péter Berettyán, Dr. Zsolt Varga; Fourth official: Georgiou Theodoros; Goal-line assistants: József Erdős, Eszter Urbán

3 December 2016 18	Gyirmót	0–4	Honvéd	Győr
15:30 CET (UTC+1)	Filkor (yellow card) 80'	Report	Prosser 49'; Holender 61'; Koszta (yellow card) 72'; Kamber 78'; Hidi 83'	Stadium: Ménfői úti Stadion; Attendance: 954; Referee: Csaba Pintér; Assistant referees: Krisztián Király, Gergely Becséri; Fourth official: Oszkár Lémon; Goal-line assistants: Sándor Andó-Szabó, Tibor Gyarmati II

10 December 2016 19	Honvéd	1–0	Mezőkövesd	Budapest
15:30 CET (UTC+1)	Eppel 70'; Koszta (yellow card) 80'	Report	Molnár (yellow card) 49'; Devecseri (yellow card) 61'; Mevoungou (yellow card) 90+1'	Stadium: Bozsik József Stadion; Attendance: 1,679; Referee: Balázs Berke; Assistant referees: László Viszokai, Róbert Horváth; Fourth official: Balázs Farkas; Goal-line assistants: Ádám Németh, Katalin Kulcsár

18 February 2017 20	MTK	1–2	Honvéd	Budapest
15:30 CET (UTC+1)	Poór (yellow card) 37'; Torghelle 59', (red card) 66'; Ramos (yellow card) 86'	Report	Koszta (yellow card) 45'; Lanzafame 49'; Eppel 77'	Stadium: Hidegkuti Nándor Stadion; Attendance: 2,706; Referee: Csaba Pintér; Assistant referees: Vencel Tóth II, Balázs Szalai; Fourth official: Krisztián Király; Goal-line assistants: Gergely Szőts, Gyöngyi Gaál

25 February 2017 21	Honvéd	1–0	Debrecen	Budapest
15:30 CET (UTC+1)	Eppel 85'	Report	Brković (yellow card) 90+2'	Stadium: Bozsik József Stadion; Attendance: 2,019; Referee: Balázs Berke; Assistant referees: Dr. Zsolt Varga, Oszkár Lémon; Fourth official: Tamás Márkus; Goal-line assistants: István Vad, Róbert Nagy

4 March 2017 22	Videoton	3–0	Honvéd	Felcsút (Note: The match was played at the Pancho Aréna in Felcsút, instead of Videoton regular stadium, the Sóstói Stadion in Székesfehérvár, built in 1967 which was demolished to make way to the newly built Sóstói Stadion.)
15:30 CET (UTC+1)	Lazović 38', 85'; Juhász (yellow card) 40'; Varga (yellow card) 67'; Šćepović 76', (yellow card) 79'	Report	Lovrić (red card) 61'; D. Bobál (yellow card) 75'; Kabangu (yellow card) 88'	Stadium: Pancho Aréna; Attendance: 2,749; Referee: Sándor Andó-Szabó; Assistant referees: Balázs Farkas, Balázs Szert; Fourth official: Gábor Varga Jr. Goal-line assistants: Zoltán Iványi, Ádám Németh

11 March 2017 23	Újpest	1–1	Honvéd	Budapest
18:00 CET (UTC+1)	Heris (yellow card) 17'; Kecskés (yellow card) 56'; Angelov 90+1'	Report	Zsótér (yellow card) 24', (goal) 27'; Holender (yellow card) 30'; Lanzafame (yellow card) 72'; Ikenne (yellow card) 90'	Stadium: Szusza Ferenc Stadion; Attendance: 3,130; Referee: Viktor Kassai; Assistant referees: Vencel Tóth II, Gergely Becséri; Fourth official: Péter Berettyán; Goal-line assistants: István Vad, Zoltán Iványi

1 April 2017 24	Honvéd	2–1	Ferencváros	Budapest
20:30 CEST (UTC+2)	Holender (yellow card) 16'; Zsótér 20', (yellow card) 81'; Eppel 32'; Hidi (yellow card) 57'; Baráth (yellow card) 88'	Report	Botka (yellow card) 30'; Moutari 39'	Stadium: Bozsik József Stadion; Attendance: 5,698; Referee: Péter Solymosi; Assistant referees: István Albert, Tamás Márkus; Fourth official: Dr. Zsolt Varga; Goal-line assistants: Balázs Berke, Attila Molnár

8 April 2017 25	Haladás	0–1	Honvéd	Sopron
18:00 CEST (UTC+2)	Jancsó (yellow card) 40'; Iszlai (yellow card) 42'; Bošnjak (yellow card) 73'	Report	Lovrić (yellow card) 74'; Ikenne (yellow card) 76'; Eppel 89'	Stadium: Káposztás utcai Stadion; Attendance: 2,130; Referee: József Erdős; Assistant referees: Vencel Tóth II, László Viszokai; Fourth official: Gábor Takács; Goal-line assistants: Tibor Gyarmati II, Péter Zierkelbach

11 April 2017 26	Diósgyőr	2–0	Honvéd	Mezőkövesd (Note: The match was played at the Városi Stadion in Mezőkövesd, instead of Diósgyőr regular stadium, the Diósgyőri Stadion in Miskolc, opened in 1939 which was demolished to make way to the newly built Diósgyőri Stadion.)
18:00 CEST (UTC+2)	Karan 24', (yellow card) 54'; Vela 60'; Busai (yellow card) 90+2'	Report	Vasiljević (yellow card) 81'; Baráth (yellow card) 89'	Stadium: Városi Stadion; Attendance: 2,625; Referee: Tamás Bognár; Assistant referees: Oszkár Lémon, Gábor Takács; Fourth official: János Medovarszki; Goal-line assistants: Ferenc Karakó, János Takács

15 April 2017 27	Honvéd	2–0	Paks	Budapest
18:00 CEST (UTC+2)	Eppel 18'; Zsótér 39'	Report	Gévay (yellow card) 46'	Stadium: Bozsik József Stadion; Attendance: 1,994; Referee: Balázs Berke; Assistant referees: Dr. Zsolt Varga, Balázs Szalai; Fourth official: Balázs Farkas; Goal-line assistants: Gergely Szőts, Katalin Kulcsár

22 April 2017 28	Vasas	1–0	Honvéd	Budapest (Note: The match was played at the Szusza Ferenc Stadion in Budapest, instead of Vasas regular stadium, the Illovszky Rudolf Stadion in Budapest, built in 1960 which was demolished to make way to the newly built Illovszky Rudolf Stadion.)
20:30 CEST (UTC+2)	Burmeister 42'; Korcsmár (yellow card) 62'	Report	Zsótér (yellow card) 8'; Lovrić (yellow card) 45'	Stadium: Szusza Ferenc Stadion; Attendance: 4,854; Referee: József Erdős; Assistant referees: Krisztián Király, Balázs Huszár; Fourth official: Péter Kóbor; Goal-line assistants: Szabolcs Szilasi, János Takács

29 April 2017 29	Honvéd	1–0	Gyirmót	Budapest
18:00 CEST (UTC+2)	D. Bobál (yellow card) 32'; Gazdag (yellow card) 83'; Lanzafame 90+5', (yellow card) 90+5'	Report	Radeljić (yellow card) 26'; Vass (yellow card) 41'; Nad (yellow card) 58'; Á. Simon (yellow card) 59'; A. Simon (yellow card) 80'	Stadium: Bozsik József Stadion; Attendance: 2,347; Referee: Gergely Szőts; Assistant referees: Péter Berettyán, János Medovarszki; Fourth official: Dániel Szalai; Goal-line assistants: Zoltán Iványi, Gyöngyi Gaál

6 May 2017 30	Mezőkövesd	1–5	Honvéd	Mezőkövesd
18:00 CEST (UTC+2)	Hudák (yellow card) 13'; Kink 17'; Gohér (yellow card) 23'; Vági (yellow card) 48'	Report	Nagy (yellow card) 15'; Baráth (yellow card) 48'; Kamber 51'; Lanzafame 67', 88'; Bobál 75'; Gróf (yellow card) 81'; Eppel 84'	Stadium: Városi Stadion; Attendance: 2,105; Referee: Zsolt Szabó; Assistant referees: György Ring, Krisztián Király; Fourth official: Gergely Becséri; Goal-line assistants: Balázs Berke, Gergő Bogár

13 May 2017 31	Honvéd	2–1	MTK	Budapest
18:00 CEST (UTC+2)	Holender 64'; Baráth (yellow card) 74'; Korozmán 83' (o.g.); Villám (yellow card) 90+3'	Report	Borbély (yellow card) 54'; Ramos 65'	Stadium: Bozsik József Stadion; Attendance: 3,370; Referee: Péter Solymosi; Assistant referees: Krisztián Király, Gergely Becséri; Fourth official: Gábor Takács; Goal-line assistants: Ádám Németh, Ádám Radványi

20 May 2017 32	Debrecen	2–5	Honvéd	Debrecen
18:00 CEST (UTC+2)	Danilović (yellow card) 47'; Jovanović 59'; Suk 66', (yellow card) 67'; Ferenczi (yellow card) 68'	Report	Koszta 4', 37', 90+2'; Eppel 25', 82'	Stadium: Nagyerdei Stadion; Attendance: 6,328; Referee: Ádám Farkas; Assistant referees: Georgiou Theodoros, Tamás Márkus; Fourth official: Dr. Zsolt Varga; Goal-line assistants: Tamás Bognár, János Takács

27 May 2017 33	Honvéd	1–0	Videoton	Budapest
19:00 CEST (UTC+2)	Lanzafame (yellow card) 41'; Eppel 60'; Zsótér (yellow card) 68'; Vasiljević (yellow card) 83'	Report	Lazović (yellow card) 41'; Vinícius (yellow card) 90+3'	Stadium: Bozsik József Stadion; Attendance: 8,500; Referee: Tamás Bognár; Assistant referees: Balázs Buzás, Balázs Szert; Fourth official: János Medovarszki; Goal-line assistants: Ferenc Karakó, János Takács

=== Magyar Kupa ===
14 September 2016 Round of 128	Mórahalom	1–7	Honvéd	Mórahalom
15:30 CEST (UTC+2)	Magyar (yellow card) 16'; Busa 72'	Report	Prosser 36', 65', 82'; Holender 41', 83'; Balázs 46'; Vasiljević 60'; Göblyös (yellow card) 86'	Stadium: Mórahalom Sportcentrum; Attendance: 500; Referee: Tamás Takács; Assistant referees: Tibor Csatári, Mátyás Viczián

26 October 2016 Round of 64	Rákosmente	1–6	Honvéd	Budapest
13:30 CEST (UTC+2)	Kokenszky 76'; Vattai (yellow card) 81'; Markek (yellow card) 84'	Report	Hidi 8', 66'; Holender 23'; Kabangu 64'; Tömösvári 85', 90+2'	Stadium: Riz Levente Sport- és Rendezvényközpont; Attendance: 600; Referee: Attila Molnár; Assistant referees: Zoltán Horváth, Dávid Bertalan

30 November 2016 Round of 32	Ménfőcsanak	0–5	Honvéd	Győr
12:00 CET (UTC+1)		Report	Prosser 28'; Kabangu 37'; Vasiljević 43', 70', 72'	Stadium: ESK Ménfőcsanak Sporttelep; Attendance: 1,000; Referee: Dr. Gergely Kovács; Assistant referees: Péter Kóbor, Tamás Kulman; Fourth official: Tibor Horváth

==== Round of 16 ====
11 February 2017 First leg	Ferencváros	2–1	Honvéd	Budapest
18:00 CET (UTC+1)	Moutari 32'; Botka (yellow card) 45'; Leandro 51', (yellow card) 81'; Djuricin (yellow card) 54'	Report	Laczkó (yellow card) 50'; Lovrić (yellow card) 54'; Lanzafame 88'	Stadium: Groupama Arena; Attendance: 6,817; Referee: Zoltán Iványi; Assistant referees: István Albert, Balázs Buzás; Fourth official: Ferenc Karakó

1 March 2017 Second leg	Honvéd	0–2 (1–4 agg.)	Ferencváros	Budapest
20:30 CET (UTC+1)	Holender (yellow card) 57'; Ikenne (yellow card) 90+2'	Report	Nalepa 30'; Böde 51'	Stadium: Bozsik József Stadion; Attendance: 3,128; Referee: Tamás Bognár; Assistant referees: Vencel Tóth II, László Viszokai; Fourth official: József Erdős
Note: Ferencváros won 4–1 on aggregate.

== Statistics ==
=== Overall ===
Appearances (Apps) numbers are for appearances in competitive games only, including sub appearances.
Source: Competitions

No.	Player	Pos.	Nemzeti Bajnokság I				Magyar Kupa				Total			
No.	Player	Pos.	Apps	Goal	Yellow card	Red card	Apps	Goal	Yellow card	Red card	Apps	Goal	Yellow card	Red card
1	(Ukraine) Oleksandr Nad	GK												
2	(Hungary) Dávid Bobál	DF	24	2	2	1	2				26	2	2	1
6	(Hungary) Dániel Gazdag	MF	32		5		2				34		5	
5	(Hungary) Gergely Bobál	FW	2								2			
7	(Italy) Davide Lanzafame	FW	25	11	5		2	1			27	12	5	
7	(Hungary) Richárd Vernes	MF	6		1						6		1	
8	(Nigeria) George Ikenne	DF	21		2		3		1		24		3	
9	(Hungary) Márton Eppel	FW	27	16	2		2				29	16	2	
11	(Democratic Republic of the Congo) Kadima Kabangu	FW	5		1		4	2			9	2	1	
17	(Hungary) Dániel Prosser	FW	11	4	1		3	4			14	8	1	
18	(Hungary) András Horváth	GK	8				2				10			
19	(Hungary) Márk Koszta	FW	31	6	3						31	6	3	
20	(Hungary) Dániel Kovács	MF	1								1			
21	(Hungary) Endre Botka	DF	17		5		2				19		5	
21	(Hungary) Bálint Tömösvári	FW	3				2	2			5	2		
22	(Hungary) Dániel Göblyös	MF					2		1		2		1	
23	(Hungary) Donát Zsótér	MF	22	3	5		3				25	3	5	
24	(Serbia) Đorđe Kamber	MF	32	3	2		2				34	3	2	
25	(Croatia) Ivan Lovrić	DF	28		6	1	5		1		33		7	1
26	(Hungary) Patrik Hidi	MF	28	3	4	1	4	2			32	5	4	1
30	(Romania) Raul Palmeș	DF	1				2				3			
36	(Hungary) Botond Baráth	DF	22		7		3				25		7	
38	(Hungary) Ádám Hajdú	DF	13		1		3				16		1	
57	(Serbia) Filip Holender	FW	27	2	5		4	3	1		31	5	6	
66	(Serbia) Dušan Vasiljević	MF	15	1	3		5	4			20	5	3	
70	(Hungary) Ákos Bíró	FW					1				1			
77	(Hungary) Gergő Nagy	MF	19	1	2		5				24	1	2	
86	(Hungary) Zsolt Laczkó	MF	3				1		1		4		1	
89	(Hungary) Balázs Villám	DF	5		1						5		1	
92	(Hungary) Zsolt Balázs	FW	9				3	1			12	1		
99	(Hungary) Dávid Gróf	GK	25		1		3				28		1	
Own goals				3								3		
Totals				55	64	3		19	5			74	69	3

=== Hat-tricks ===
No.	Player	Against	Result	Date	Competition
17	(Hungary) Dániel Prosser	Mórahalom (A)	7–1	14 September 2016	Magyar Kupa
66	(Serbia) Dušan Vasiljević	Ménfőcsanak (A)	5–0	30 November 2016	Magyar Kupa
19	(Hungary) Márk Koszta	Debrecen (A)	5–2	20 May 2017	Nemzeti Bajnokság I

=== Clean sheets ===
			Clean sheets		
No.	Player	Games Played	Nemzeti Bajnokság I	Magyar Kupa	Total
99	(Hungary) Dávid Gróf	28	10		10
18	(Hungary) András Horváth	10	3	1	4
1	(Ukraine) Oleksandr Nad				
Totals			13	1	14

== Awards ==
=== Nemzeti Bajnokság I top scorer ===
Player	Goals	Ref
(Hungary) Márton Eppel	16	

=== Nemzeti Bajnokság I Manager of the Season ===
Manager	Ref
(Italy) Marco Rossi	

=== Nemzeti Bajnokság I Young Player Award ===
Player	Ref
(Hungary) Donát Zsótér	
