= 2015–16 Budapest Honvéd FC season =

Budapest Honvéd
2015–16 season
- Chairman: George Hemingway
- Manager: Marco Rossi
- Stadium: Bozsik József Stadion
- Nemzeti Bajnokság I: 8th
- Magyar Kupa: Round of 16
- Top goalscorer: League: Đorđe Kamber (9); All: Đorđe Kamber (9)
- Highest home attendance: 4,460 (vs Ferencváros, 27 February 2016)
- Lowest home attendance: 500 (vs Kozármisleny, 28 October 2015)
Home colours	Away colours

The 2015–16 season was Budapest Honvéd Football Club's 105th competitive season, 11th consecutive season in the Nemzeti Bajnokság I and 106th year in existence as a football club. In addition to the domestic league, Budapest Honvéd participated in this season's editions of the Magyar Kupa.

== First team squad ==
The players listed had league appearances and stayed until the end of the season.

Note: Flags indicate national team as defined under FIFA eligibility rules; some limited exceptions apply. Players may hold more than one non-FIFA nationality.

No.	Pos.	Nation	Player
1	GK	UKR	Oleksandr Nad
2	DF	HUN	Dávid Bobál
5	DF	SRB	Aleksandar Ignjatović
6	MF	HUN	Dániel Gazdag
7	FW	HUN	Richárd Vernes
8	DF	NGR	George Ikenne
9	FW	HUN	Márton Eppel
14	DF	ROU	Loránd Szilágyi
16	MF	HUN	Mihály Csábi
17	MF	HUN	Dániel Prosser
18	GK	HUN	András Horváth
21	DF	HUN	Endre Botka
24	MF	BIH	Đorđe Kamber
25	DF	CRO	Ivan Lovrić

No.	Pos.	Nation	Player
26	MF	HUN	Patrik Hidi
27	DF	HUN	András Márton
30	DF	ROU	Raul Palmeș
36	DF	HUN	Botond Baráth
55	FW	HUN	Dániel Lukács
57	FW	HUN	Filip Holender
63	FW	HUN	László Erdélyi
66	MF	SRB	Dušan Vasiljević
70	FW	HUN	Richárd Jelena
71	GK	HUN	Szabolcs Kemenes (captain)
77	MF	HUN	Gergő Nagy
96	FW	ROU	Dan Constantinescu
99	FW	GUI	Souleymane Youla

== Transfers ==
=== Transfers in ===
Transfer window	Pos.	No.	Player	From
Summer	MF	—	(Hungary) János Bodrogi	Youth team
Summer	DF	14	(Romania) Loránd Szilágyi	(Romania) Gaz Metan Mediaș
Summer	MF	22	(Hungary) Dániel Göblyös	Youth team
Summer	DF	23	(Hungary) Gábor Erdős	Youth team
Summer	MF	24	(Bosnia and Herzegovina) Đorđe Kamber	Free agent (Note: Previous club: Győr.)
Summer	DF	25	(Croatia) Ivan Lovrić	Kecskemét
Summer	GK	44	(Hungary) Dániel Vajda	Youth team
Summer	MF	60	(Hungary) Dávid Soós	Youth team
Summer	MF	66	(Serbia) Dušan Vasiljević	Free agent (Note: Previous club: Újpest.)
Winter	DF	—	(Hungary) Bence Gergényi	Youth team
Winter	FW	—	(Democratic Republic of the Congo) Kadima Kabangu	Free agent (Note: Previous club: Saint-Éloi Lupopo.)
Winter	FW	—	(Hungary) Patrick Pisont	Youth team
Winter	GK	1	(Ukraine) Oleksandr Nad	(Romania) Bihor Oradea
Winter	FW	9	(Hungary) Márton Eppel	Dunaújváros
Winter	FW	55	(Hungary) Dániel Lukács	Youth team

=== Transfers out ===
Transfer window	Pos.	No.	Player	To
Summer
Summer	FW	—	(Serbia) Nikola Pantovic	Released
Summer	FW	11	(Somalia) Ayub Daud	Released
Summer	FW	13	(Serbia) Bratislav Punoševac	Released (Note: Joined Békéscsaba.)
Summer	DF	13	(Italy) Raffaele Alcibiade	Haladás
Summer	FW	14	(Ghana) Emmanuel Mensah	Released (Note: Joined Zemplín Michalovce.)
Summer	DF	15	(Serbia) Josip Projić	(Serbia) Napredak Kruševac
Summer	MF	20	(Panama) Aníbal Godoy	(United States) San Jose Earthquakes
Summer	DF	28	(Hungary) Richárd Czár	Dunaújváros
Summer	MF	29	(Hungary) Richárd Kozma	Siófok
Summer	MF	30	(Hungary) Bálint Vécsei	(Italy) Bologna
Summer	GK	31	(Hungary) Márton Czuczi	Szigetszentmiklós
Summer	DF	34	(Guadeloupe) Jean-Pierre Morgan	Released (Note: Joined Fabrègues.)
Summer	MF	35	(Hungary) Benjámin Tóth	Szigetszentmiklós
Summer	FW	39	(Togo) Francis Koné	(Czech Republic) Slovácko
Summer	MF	44	(Venezuela) Jesús Meza	(Venezuela) Aragua
Summer	FW	49	(Colombia) Jhon Jairo Palacios	Released
Summer	DF	88	(Montenegro) Marko Vidović	(Albania) Partizani Tirana
Winter	DF	—	(Hungary) Olivér Hesz	Csepel
Winter	FW	—	(Hungary) Sándor Tokodi	Monor
Winter	DF	3	(Albania) Kristi Marku	(Albania) Flamurtari
Winter	DF	21	(Hungary) János Fejes	Soroksár
Winter	MF	22	(Hungary) Valér Kapacina	Sopron
Winter	DF	24	(Hungary) Péter Dékány	Released (Note: Joined Kecskéd.)
Winter	GK	34	(Hungary) Norbert Szemerédi	Dorog
Winter	FW	87	(Hungary) Gergely Délczeg	Kisvárda
Winter	MF	94	(Hungary) Sebestyén Ihrig-Farkas	Kozármisleny

=== Loans in ===
Transfer window	Pos.	No.	Player	From	End date

=== Loans out ===
Transfer window	Pos.	No.	Player	To	End date
Summer	FW	9	(Hungary) Gergely Bobál	Wolfsburg II	End of season
Summer	MF	22	(Hungary) Valér Kapacina	Soroksár	January 2016
Summer	DF	32	(Hungary) Gyula Csemer	Tatabánya	End of season
Summer	FW	38	(Hungary) Márk Koszta	Kisvárda	End of season
Summer	DF	55	(Hungary) György Bora	Szigetszentmiklós	End of season
Summer	FW	92	(Hungary) Roland Vólent	Szigetszentmiklós	End of season
Winter	FW	—	(Hungary) Barna Tóth	Vác	End of season
Winter	FW	29	(Hungary) Attila Lőrinczy	Szolnok	End of season
Winter	GK	44	(Hungary) Dániel Vajda	Szigetszentmiklós	End of season

== Competitions ==
=== Overview ===
Competition	First match	Last match	Starting round	Final position	Record							
Competition	First match	Last match	Starting round	Final position	Pld	W	D	L	GF	GA	GD	Win %
Nemzeti Bajnokság I	18 July 2015	30 April 2016	Matchday 1	8th	33	12	7	14	40	39	+1	36.36
Magyar Kupa	12 August 2015	18 November 2015	Round of 128	Round of 16	5	3	0	2	11	7	+4	60.00
Total					38	15	7	16	51	46	+5	39.47

Source: Competitions

=== Nemzeti Bajnokság I ===
==== League table ====
Pos	Team	Pld	W	D	L	GF	GA	GD	Pts
6	Újpest	33	11	13	9	42	37	+5	46
7	Paks	33	12	7	14	41	40	+1	43
8	Honvéd	33	12	7	14	40	39	+1	43
9	Diósgyőr	33	10	8	15	37	47	−10	38
10	Vasas	33	9	5	19	32	54	−22	32

Source: Soccerway
Rules for classification: 1) Points; 2) Matches won; 3) Goal difference; 4) Goals scored; 5) Head-to-head points; 6) Head-to-head goal difference; 7) Head-to-head away goals scored; 8) Fairplay; 9) Draw.

==== Results summary ====
Overall								Home						Away					
Pld	W	D	L	GF	GA	GD	Pts	W	D	L	GF	GA	GD	W	D	L	GF	GA	GD
33	12	7	14	40	39	+1	43	8	4	4	20	15	+5	4	3	10	20	24	−4

Source: Hungarian Football Federation

==== Results by round ====
Round	1	2	3	4	5	6	7	8	9	10	11	12	13	14	15	16	17	18	19	20	21	22	23	24	25	26	27	28	29	30	31	32	33
Ground	H	H	H	A	A	A	H	H	A	H	A	A	A	A	H	H	H	A	A	H	A	H	H	A	A	H	A	H	A	H	A	H	A
Result	W	W	D	L	D	W	D	L	D	W	L	L	L	D	D	L	W	W	L	L	L	W	D	L	W	W	L	W	L	L	W	W	L
Position	4	2	3	5	5	2	4	4	5	3	5	6	6	8	8	8	8	8	8	8	8	8	8	8	8	8	8	8	8	9	7	7	8

Source: Matches
A = Away; H = Home; W = Win; D = Draw; L = Loss

==== Matches ====
18 July 2015 1	Budapest Honvéd	1–0	Videoton	Budapest
20:30 CEST (UTC+2)	Botka (yellow card) 46'; Kamber (yellow card) 58'; Youla 84'	Report	Juhász (yellow card) 49'; Lang (red card) 83'; Szolnoki (yellow card) 86'	Stadium: Bozsik József Stadion; Attendance: 2,020; Referee: István Vad

25 July 2015 2	Budapest Honvéd	2–1	MTK Budapest	Budapest
15:30 CEST (UTC+2)	Kamber 43'; Bobál (yellow card) 85'; Vernes 86'; Baráth (yellow card) 90+2'	Report	Střeštík 37'; Thiam (yellow card) 45'; Torghelle (yellow card) 72'	Stadium: Bozsik József Stadion; Attendance: 1,480; Referee: Viktor Kassai

2 August 2015 3	Budapest Honvéd	3–3	Debrecen	Budapest
18:00 CEST (UTC+2)	Zsidai 11' (o.g.); Botka 40'; Holender 48'; Gazdag (yellow card) 69'	Report	Zsidai (yellow card) 27'; Castillion 43', (yellow card) 57'; Varga (yellow card) 49'; Tisza (yellow card) 62', (goal) 90+3'; N. Balogh 63'	Stadium: Bozsik József Stadion; Attendance: 2,700; Referee: Sándor Andó-Szabó

8 August 2015 4	Paks	3–1	Budapest Honvéd	Paks
18:00 CEST (UTC+2)	Szabó 16'; Kulcsár (yellow card) 38'; Balázs 39', 63'; Lenzsér (yellow card) 81'	Report	G. Nagy (yellow card) 29'; Youla (yellow card) 38'; Bobál (yellow card) 79'; Ignjatović 89'; Vernes (yellow card) 90+2'; Baráth (yellow card) 90+4'	Stadium: Fehérvári úti Stadion; Attendance: 1,523; Referee: Tamás Bognár

15 August 2015 5	Újpest	1–1	Budapest Honvéd	Budapest
18:00 CEST (UTC+2)	G. Nagy (yellow card) 46'; Tóth (yellow card) 67', (goal) 88'; Balogh (yellow card) 73'	Report	Youla (yellow card) 20', (goal) 62'; Kamber (yellow card) 45'; Prosser (yellow card) 49'; Lovrić (yellow card) 68'; Gazdag (yellow card) 90+2'; G. Nagy (yellow card) 90+4'	Stadium: Ferenc Szusza Stadium; Attendance: 4,157; Referee: István Vad

22 August 2015 6	Békéscsaba	1–4	Budapest Honvéd	Békéscsaba
18:00 CEST (UTC+2)	Calvente 54'	Report	Kamber 30', 90+1'; Youla 58'; Délczeg (yellow card) 77'; Koszó 84' (o.g.); Ignjatović (yellow card) 85'; G. Nagy (yellow card) 88'	Stadium: Stadion Kórház utcai Attendance: 1,658; Referee: Péter Solymosi

29 August 2015 7	Budapest Honvéd	0–0	Puskás Akadémia	Budapest
18:00 CEST (UTC+2)	Bobál (yellow card) 17'; Holender (yellow card) 33'; Botka (yellow card) 39'; Kamber (yellow card) 61'; Lovrić (yellow card) 85'	Report	Fodor (yellow card) 25'; Márkvárt (yellow card) 45'; Sallai (yellow card) 90+5'	Stadium: Bozsik József Stadion; Attendance: 2,800; Referee: Viktor Kassai

12 September 2015 8	Budapest Honvéd	0–1	Vasas	Budapest
18:00 CEST (UTC+2)	Lovrić (yellow card) 24'; Délczeg (yellow card) 68'; Baráth (yellow card) 90'	Report	Hangya (yellow card) 8'; Novák (yellow card) 13'; Osváth 18'; Adamović (yellow card) 33'; Pajović (yellow card) 60'	Stadium: Bozsik József Stadion; Attendance: 2,530; Referee: Sándor Andó-Szabó

19 September 2015 9	Haladás	0–0	Budapest Honvéd	Szombathely
18:00 CEST (UTC+2)	Bošnjak (yellow card) 39'; Gosztonyi (yellow card) 42'; Wils (yellow card) 60'; Jagodics (yellow card) 74'; Angyal (yellow card) 87'	Report	Gazdag (yellow card) 37'; Youla (yellow card) 45'; Ignjatović (yellow card) 48'; Délczeg (yellow card) 83'	Stadium: Rohonci Street Stadium; Attendance: 3,439; Referee: Ádám Farkas

26 September 2015 10	Budapest Honvéd	2–1	Diósgyőr	Budapest
18:00 CEST (UTC+2)	Vernes (yellow card) 44', (goal) 45+1'; Kamber 90+2'	Report	Barczi 50', (yellow card) 90+1'; James (yellow card) 83'	Stadium: Bozsik József Stadion; Attendance: 2,012; Referee: Zsolt Szabó

3 October 2015 11	Ferencváros	2–1	Budapest Honvéd	Budapest
20:30 CEST (UTC+2)	Šesták (yellow card) 17'; Hajnal 35'; Varga 39'; Ramírez (yellow card) 76'; Haraszti (yellow card) 90'	Report	Vernes (yellow card) 8'; Youla 9', (yellow card) 43'; Botka (yellow card) 71'; G. Nagy (yellow card) 75'	Stadium: Groupama Arena; Attendance: 9,037; Referee: Viktor Kassai

17 October 2015 12	Videoton	3–0	Budapest Honvéd	Székesfehérvár
18:00 CEST (UTC+2)	Feczesin 34', (yellow card) 35'; Gyurcsó 45+1'; Szolnoki (yellow card) 61'; Danilović (yellow card) 61'; Juhász 74', (yellow card) 81'	Report	Vernes (yellow card) 9'; Gazdag (yellow card) 39'; Youla (yellow card) 61'	Stadium: Sóstói Stadion; Attendance: 2,290; Referee: Zoltán Iványi

24 October 2015 13	MTK Budapest	2–1	Budapest Honvéd	Budapest
17:30 CEST (UTC+2)	Torghelle 33', 39'; Střeštík (yellow card) 65'; Grgić (yellow card) 72'; Hrepka (yellow card) 89'; D. Gera (yellow card) 90+4'	Report	Kamber 54'; Bobál (yellow card) 62'; Erdélyi (yellow card) 80'	Stadium: Stadion Rudolf Illovszky; Attendance: 1,174; Referee: István Vad

31 October 2015 14	Debrecen	0–0	Budapest Honvéd	Debrecen
16:00 CET (UTC+1)	Korhut (yellow card) 3'	Report	Szilágyi (yellow card) 11'; Lovrić (yellow card) 31'; G. Nagy (yellow card) 45'	Stadium: Nagyerdei Stadion; Attendance: 2,746; Referee: Ádám Németh

21 November 2015 16	Budapest Honvéd	1–2	Újpest	Budapest
15:30 CET (UTC+1)	Bobál 81'; Botka (yellow card) 82'; Baráth (yellow card) 90+3'	Report	Balázs (yellow card) 11'; Diagne 67'; Hazard 74'	Stadium: Bozsik József Stadion; Attendance: 1,500; Referee: Ádám Farkas

28 November 2015 17	Budapest Honvéd	3–2	Békéscsaba	Budapest
15:30 CET (UTC+1)	G. Nagy 6', 63'; Holender (yellow card) 40'; Prosser (yellow card) 72'; Baráth 90+1'	Report	Vaskó 3'; Birtalan 34', (yellow card) 75'; Viczián (yellow card) 36'; Punoševac (yellow card) 53'	Stadium: Bozsik József Stadion; Attendance: 500; Referee: Zsolt Szabó

2 December 2015 15	Budapest Honvéd	0–0	Paks	Budapest
18:30 CET (UTC+1)	Botka (yellow card) 38'; Hidi (red card) 49'	Report	Lenzsér (yellow card) 56'; Bartha (yellow card) 80'; Kulcsár (yellow card) 90+1'	Stadium: Bozsik József Stadion; Attendance: 500; Referee: Zoltán Iványi
Note: The matches of the 15th round were originally scheduled for 7 November 2015, but was postponed due to HFF decision.

5 December 2015 18	Puskás Akadémia	0–3	Budapest Honvéd	Felcsút
15:30 CET (UTC+1)	Nagy (yellow card) 11'; Lencse (yellow card) 19'; Tischler (yellow card) 21'; Kelić (yellow card) 51'	Report	Ikenne (yellow card) 12'; Prosser 27'; Youla 35'; Ignjatović (yellow card) 54'; Kamber 90+4'	Stadium: Pancho Aréna; Attendance: 913; Referee: Ferenc Karakó

12 December 2015 19	Vasas	2–1	Budapest Honvéd	Budapest
15:30 CET (UTC+1)	Pajović (yellow card) 33'; Kenesei 75' (pen.); Ádám (yellow card) 77'; Debreceni 79'	Report	Botka (yellow card) 31'; Kamber 42'	Stadium: Stadion Rudolf Illovszky; Attendance: 900; Referee: Ádám Németh

13 February 2016 20	Budapest Honvéd	0–1	Haladás	Budapest
15:30 CET (UTC+1)	G. Nagy (yellow card) 68'	Report	Wils 44'; Iszlai (yellow card) 58'; Ugrai (yellow card) 75'; P. Nagy (yellow card) 85'	Stadium: Bozsik József Stadion; Attendance: 1,570; Referee: Sándor Andó-Szabó

20 February 2016 21	Diósgyőr	2–1	Budapest Honvéd	Miskolc
15:00 CET (UTC+1)	Bacsa 18', 34'; Kovács (yellow card) 71'; Tamás (yellow card) 81'; Radoš (yellow card) 88'	Report	Ignjatović (yellow card) 23'; Szilágyi (yellow card) 28'; Ikenne (yellow card) 47'; Kamber 69'; G. Nagy (yellow card) 74'; Gazdag (yellow card) 76'	Stadium: Diósgyőri Stadion; Attendance: 2,991; Referee: Viktor Kassai

27 February 2016 22	Budapest Honvéd	2–1	Ferencváros	Budapest
18:00 CET (UTC+1)	Botka (yellow card) 22'; Baráth 41', (yellow card) 59'; Vasiljević 56'; Lovrić (yellow card) 62'; Kamber (yellow card) 81'; Youla (yellow card) 90+5'	Report	D. Nagy (yellow card) 66'; Lamah 88'; Dilaver (red card) 95'	Stadium: Bozsik József Stadion; Attendance: 4,460; Referee: Péter Solymosi

5 March 2016 23	Budapest Honvéd	0–0	Vasas	Budapest
18:00 CET (UTC+1)	Botka (yellow card) 40'; Vasiljević (yellow card) 50'; Eppel (red card) 59'; Gazdag (red card) 70'	Report	Ristevski (yellow card) 33'; Vida (yellow card) 52'; Könyves (yellow card) 90'	Stadium: Bozsik József Stadion; Attendance: 1,659; Referee: Ferenc Karakó

9 March 2016 24	MTK Budapest	1–0	Budapest Honvéd	Dunaújváros
18:00 CET (UTC+1)	Hrepka 29'	Report	Youla (yellow card) 70'; Lovrić (yellow card) 71'; Prosser (yellow card) 84'	Stadium: Dunaújvárosi Stadion; Attendance: 520; Referee: István Vad

12 March 2016 25	Debrecen	0–3	Budapest Honvéd	Debrecen
15:30 CET (UTC+1)	Holman (yellow card) 77'	Report	Eppel 4', 26'; Botka (yellow card) 23'; Hidi 38'; G. Nagy (yellow card) 67'	Stadium: Nagyerdei Stadion; Attendance: 2,327; Referee: Viktor Kassai

19 March 2016 26	Budapest Honvéd	2–0	Paks	Budapest
15:30 CET (UTC+1)	Eppel 7', 62'; Holender (yellow card) 69'	Report	Gévay (yellow card) 35'; Lenzsér (yellow card) 61'	Stadium: Bozsik József Stadion; Attendance: 1,307; Referee: Zsolt Szabó

2 April 2016 28	Budapest Honvéd	2–1	Videoton	Budapest
18:30 CEST (UTC+2)	Bobál (yellow card) 25'; Eppel 31'; Lovrić (yellow card) 68'; Vernes 90+2'	Report	Feczesin 32'; Fejes (yellow card) 41'; Oliveira (yellow card) 58'; Pátkai (red card) 90'	Stadium: Bozsik József Stadion; Attendance: 1,829; Referee: István Vad

6 April 2016 29	Újpest	2–0	Budapest Honvéd	Budapest
15:45 CEST (UTC+2)	Heris (yellow card) 38'; Balogh 46'; Bardhi 64'; Litauszki (yellow card) 79'	Report	Szilágyi (yellow card) 30'; Baráth (yellow card) 72'; Kamber (yellow card) 75'	Stadium: Ferenc Szusza Stadium; Attendance: 1,131; Referee: Viktor Kassai

10 April 2016 27	Ferencváros	2–1	Budapest Honvéd	Budapest
19:00 CEST (UTC+2)	Trinks 63'; Busai 70'; D. Nagy (yellow card) 76'	Report	Busai 26' (o.g.); Ikenne (yellow card) 36'; Holender (yellow card) 72'	Stadium: Groupama Arena; Attendance: 7,053; Referee: Sándor Andó-Szabó
Note: The matches of the 27th round were originally scheduled for 30 March 2016, but were postponed to ease the pressure on the tight schedule.

16 April 2016 30	Budapest Honvéd	0–1	Haladás	Budapest
18:00 CEST (UTC+2)	Botka (red card) 100'	Report	Halmosi (yellow card) 39'; Bošnjak (yellow card) 52'; Iszlai 65' (pen.)	Stadium: Bozsik József Stadion; Attendance: 1,447; Referee: Gergely Szőts

20 April 2016 31	Diósgyőr	1–2	Budapest Honvéd	Miskolc
19:00 CEST (UTC+2)	Novothny 45'; Kovács (yellow card) 53'; Barczi (yellow card) 60'; Grumić (yellow card) 85'	Report	Holender 7', (yellow card) 76'; Kamber 59'	Stadium: Diósgyőri Stadion; Attendance: 3,340; Referee: Zoltán Iványi

23 April 2016 32	Budapest Honvéd	2–1	Békéscsaba	Budapest
18:00 CEST (UTC+2)	Baráth 29'; Vasiljević 36'	Report	Laczkó 25', (red card) 90+2'; Piermayr (yellow card) 80'; Viczián (yellow card) 90+3'	Stadium: Bozsik József Stadion; Attendance: 1,284; Referee: Csaba Pintér

30 April 2016 33	Puskás Akadémia	2–1	Budapest Honvéd	Felcsút
16:30 CEST (UTC+2)	Bačelić-Grgić 20'; Tar 31'; Sallai (yellow card) 81'; Pogacsics (yellow card) 83'	Report	Ikenne (yellow card) 73'; Bobál 90+2'	Stadium: Pancho Aréna; Attendance: 3,613; Referee: Zoltán Iványi

=== Magyar Kupa ===
12 August 2015 Round of 128	Győr	0–2	Budapest Honvéd	Győr
18:00 CEST (UTC+2)	Mayer (yellow card) 17'; Á. Nagy (yellow card) 71'	Report	Lovrić 27'; Ihrig-Farkas 53'; Vécsei (yellow card) 76'	Stadium: ETO Park; Attendance: 1,600; Referee: Szabolcs Szilasi

23 September 2015 Round of 64	Bonyhád	0–2	Budapest Honvéd	Bonyhád
15:00 CEST (UTC+2)	Szlama (yellow card) 27'; Szász (yellow card) 90+2'	Report	Csábi (yellow card) 37'; Ignjatović (yellow card) 45'; Délczeg 53'; Prosser 72'	Stadium: Bonyhád VLC Sporttelep; Attendance: 1,150; Referee: Katalin Sipos

14 October 2015 Round of 32	Soroksár	3–5 (a.e.t.)	Budapest Honvéd	Budapest
14:00 CEST (UTC+2)	Gárdos 10'; Hidi 20' (o.g.); Szalánszki (yellow card) 32'; Holczer (yellow card) 34'; Huszák 43'	Report	Holender 14'; Hidi 34', (yellow card) 87'; Vasiljević 63'; Youla 104'; Baráth 118'	Stadium: Szamosi Mihály Sportelep; Attendance: 500; Referee: Szabolcs Szilasi

Round of 16

28 October 2015 First leg	Budapest Honvéd	1–2	Kozármisleny	Budapest
17:00 CET (UTC+1)	Csábi (yellow card) 35'; Ikenne (yellow card) 56'; Youla 62'; Vernes (yellow card) 70'; Kamber (yellow card) 74'; Vasiljević (yellow card) 84'	Report	Fellai (yellow card) 38'; Wittrédi 51'; Kirchner 57'; Gránicz (yellow card) 73'; Lantos (yellow card) 88'	Stadium: Bozsik József Stadion; Attendance: 500; Referee: Róbert Nagy

18 November 2015 Second leg	Kozármisleny	2–1 (4–2 agg.)	Budapest Honvéd	Kozármisleny
12:00 CET (UTC+1)	Wittrédi 19'; Beke 67'; Kovács (yellow card) 70'	Report	Baráth (yellow card) 87'; Vasiljević 90'	Stadium: Kozármislenyi Stadion; Attendance: 2,000; Referee: Csaba Pintér
Note: Kozármisleny won 4-2 on aggregate.

== Statistics ==
=== Overall ===
Appearances (Apps) numbers are for appearances in competitive games only, including sub appearances.
Source: Competitions

No.	Player	Pos.	Nemzeti Bajnokság I				Magyar Kupa				Total			
No.	Player	Pos.	Apps	Goal	Yellow card	Red card	Apps	Goal	Yellow card	Red card	Apps	Goal	Yellow card	Red card
1	(Ukraine) Oleksandr Nad	GK	1								1			
2	(Hungary) Dávid Bobál	DF	31	2	5		1				32	2	5	
5	(Serbia) Aleksandar Ignjatović	DF	14	1	4		5		1		19	1	5	
6	(Hungary) Dániel Gazdag	MF	24		5	1	2				26		5	1
7	(Hungary) Richárd Vernes	FW	27	3	4		5		1		32	3	5	
8	(Nigeria) George Ikenne	DF	11		4		2		1		13		5	
9	(Hungary) Márton Eppel	FW	11	5		1					11	5		1
14	(Romania) Loránd Szilágyi	DF	4		3		3				7		3	
16	(Hungary) Mihály Csábi	MF	4				3		2		7		2	
17	(Hungary) Dániel Prosser	MF	19	1	3		2	1			21	2	3	
18	(Hungary) András Horváth	GK	15				1				16			
20	(Hungary) Dániel Kovács	MF					1				1			
21	(Hungary) Endre Botka	DF	31	1	9	1	1				32	1	9	1
22	(Hungary) Dániel Göblyös	MF					2				2			
23	(Hungary) Gábor Erdős	DF					2				2			
24	(Bosnia and Herzegovina) Đorđe Kamber	MF	31	9	5		3		1		34	9	6	
25	(Croatia) Ivan Lovrić	DF	21		7		5	1			26	1	7	
25	(Hungary) Kristóf Herjeczki	FW												
26	(Hungary) Patrik Hidi	MF	29	1		1	4	1	1		33	2	1	1
27	(Hungary) András Márton	DF	1								1			
29	(Hungary) Attila Lőrinczy	FW					2				2			
30	(Hungary) Bálint Vécsei	MF	5				1		1		1		1	
30	(Romania) Raul Palmeș	DF	1								1			
34	(Hungary) Norbert Szemerédi	GK												
34	(Hungary) Dániel Vereckei	GK												
36	(Hungary) Botond Baráth	DF	30	3	6		2	1	1		32	4	7	
44	(Hungary) Dániel Vajda	GK												
55	(Hungary) Dániel Lukács	FW	2				1				3			
57	(Hungary) Filip Holender	FW	28	2	5		2	1			30	3	5	
60	(Hungary) Dávid Soós	MF												
63	(Hungary) László Erdélyi	FW	1		1		2				3		1	
66	(Serbia) Dušan Vasiljević	MF	22	2	1		4	2	1		26	4	2	
70	(Hungary) Richárd Jelena	FW	2								2			
71	(Hungary) Szabolcs Kemenes	GK	17				4				21			
77	(Hungary) Gergő Nagy	MF	32	2	8		2				34	2	8	
87	(Hungary) Gergely Délczeg	FW	10		3		4	1			14	1	3	
94	(Hungary) Sebestyén Ihrig-Farkas	MF	2				2	1			4	1		
96	(Romania) Dan Constantinescu	FW	5								5			
99	(Guinea) Souleymane Youla	FW	29	5	7		3	2			32	7	7	
Own goals				3								3		
Totals				40	80	4		11	10			51	90	4

=== Clean sheets ===
			Clean sheets		
No.	Player	Games Played	Nemzeti Bajnokság I	Magyar Kupa	Total
71	(Hungary) Szabolcs Kemenes	21	5	1	6
18	(Hungary) András Horváth	16	4	1	5
1	(Ukraine) Oleksandr Nad	1	0		0
34	(Hungary) Dániel Vereckei	0			0
34	(Hungary) Norbert Szemerédi	0			0
44	(Hungary) Dániel Vajda	0			0
Totals			9	2	11
