= Dániel Lukács =

Hungarian footballer (born 1996)

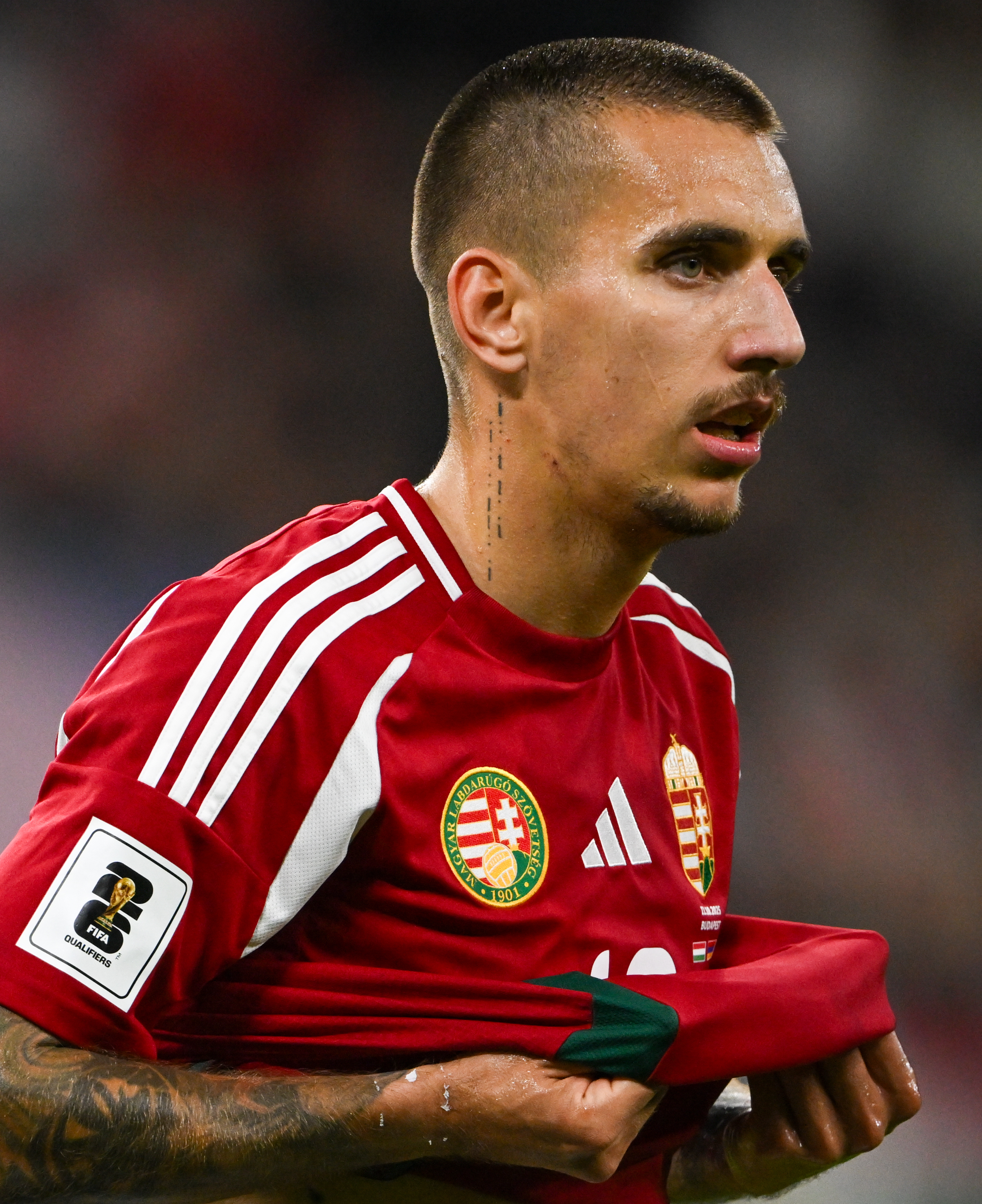
- Lukács with Hungary in 2025

Personal information
- Date of birth: 3 April 1996 (age 30)
- Place of birth: Budapest, Hungary
- Height: 1.82 m (6 ft 0 in)
- Position: Forward

Team information
- Current team: Puskás Akadémia
- Number: 8

Youth career
- 2011–2013: Rákospalota

Senior career*
Years	Team	Apps	(Gls)
2013–2014	Rákospalota	5	(0)
2014–2021	Honvéd II	104	(32)
2014–2021	Honvéd	14	(2)
2018–2019	→ Újpest (loan)	7	(0)
2020	→ Tiszakécske (loan)	7	(1)
2021–2022	Kecskemét	35	(25)
2022–2024	Diósgyőr	55	(21)
2024–2025	Kecskemét	43	(8)
2025–	Puskás Akadémia	33	(17)

International career^{‡}
2025–	Hungary	13	(2)
- * Club domestic league appearances and goals as of 17 May 2026 ‡ National team caps and goals as of 7 October 2026

Dániel Lukács (born 3 April 1996) is a Hungarian professional footballer who plays as a forward for Nemzeti Bajnokság I club Puskás Akadémia and the Hungary national team.

== Career ==
=== Budapest Honvéd ===
On 28 November 2015, Lukács played his first match for Budapest Honvéd in a 3–2 win against Békéscsaba in the Hungarian League.

=== Loans to Újpest and Tiszakécske ===
On 31 August 2018, he signed for Nemzeti Bajnokság I club Újpest on loan until the end of the 2018–19 season.

On 8 January 2020, he joined Tiszakécske in the Nemzeti Bajnokság II on a half-season long loan.

=== Return to Kecskemét ===
On 19 January 2024, Lukács returned to Kecskemét.

== International career ==
He scored his first goal in a 2–0 victory over Armenia in the 2026 FIFA World Cup qualification match at the Puskás Aréna on 11 October 2025. In an interview, published on Nemzeti Sport, he said that he and his wife were crying when it had turned out that he would be in the squad against Armenia and Portugal. He also said that 11 October 2025 was his most beautiful night in his life when he scored his first goal for the national side.

== Career statistics ==
=== Club ===
As of match played 16 May 2026

Appearances and goals by club, season and competition
Club	Season	League			National cup (Note: Includes Magyar Kupa)		League cup (Note: Includes Ligakupa)		Europe		Total	
Club	Season	Division	Apps	Goals	Apps	Goals	Apps	Goals	Apps	Goals	Apps	Goals
Rákospalota	2013–14	Nemzeti Bajnokság III	5	0	—		—		—		5	0
Honvéd II	2014–15	Nemzeti Bajnokság III	3	0	—		—		—		3	0
Honvéd II	2015–16	Nemzeti Bajnokság III	16	3	—		—		—		16	3
Honvéd II	2016–17	Nemzeti Bajnokság III	19	4	—		—		—		19	4
Honvéd II	2017–18	Nemzeti Bajnokság III	23	6	—		—		—		23	6
Honvéd II	2019–20	Nemzeti Bajnokság III	17	6	—		—		—		17	6
Honvéd II	2020–21	Nemzeti Bajnokság III	26	13	—		—		—		26	13
Honvéd II	Total		104	32	—		—		—		104	32
Honvéd	2014–15	Nemzeti Bajnokság I	—		—		1	0	—		1	0
Honvéd	2015–16	Nemzeti Bajnokság I	2	0	1	0	—		—		3	0
Honvéd	2017–18	Nemzeti Bajnokság I	7	0	3	0	—		—		10	0
Honvéd	2018–19	Nemzeti Bajnokság I	5	2	—		—		4 (Note: Appearances in UEFA Europa League)	0	9	2
Honvéd	2019–20	Nemzeti Bajnokság I	0	0	—		—		0	0	0	0
Honvéd	2020–21	Nemzeti Bajnokság I	0	0	1	0	—		—		1	0
Honvéd	Total		14	2	5	0	1	0	4	0	24	2
Újpest (loan)	2018–19	Nemzeti Bajnokság I	7	0	3	1	—		—		10	1
Tiszakécske (loan)	2019–20	Nemzeti Bajnokság II	7	1	—		—		—		7	1
Kecskemét	2021–22	Nemzeti Bajnokság II	35	25	2	0	—		—		37	25
Diósgyőr	2022–23	Nemzeti Bajnokság II	38	19	1	0	—		—		39	19
Diósgyőr	2023–24	Nemzeti Bajnokság I	17	2	2	1	—		—		19	3
Diósgyőr	Total		55	21	3	1	—		—		58	22
Kecskemét	2023–24	Nemzeti Bajnokság I	15	3	2	0	—		—		17	3
Kecskemét	2024–25	Nemzeti Bajnokság I	28	5	2	2	—		—		30	7
Kecskemét	Total		43	8	4	2	—		—		47	10
Puskás Akadémia	2025–26	Nemzeti Bajnokság I	33	17	1	0	1 (Note: Appearance in UEFA Conference League)	0	—		35	17
Career total			303	104	18	4	2	0	4	0	327	110

=== International ===
As of match played 5 October 2026

Appearances and goals by national team, year and competition
National team	Year	Apps	Goals
Hungary	2025	5	2
Hungary	2026	8	0
Total		13	2

Scores and results list Hungary's goal tally first, score column indicates score after each Lukács goal.

List of international goals scored by Dániel Lukács
No.	Date	Venue	Cap	Opponent	Score	Result	Competition
1	11 October 2025	Puskás Aréna, Budapest, Hungary	2	Armenia	1–0	2–0	2026 FIFA World Cup qualification
2	16 November 2025	Puskás Aréna, Budapest, Hungary	5	Republic of Ireland	1–0	2–3	2026 FIFA World Cup qualification
