= András Horváth (footballer, born 1988) =

Hungarian footballer

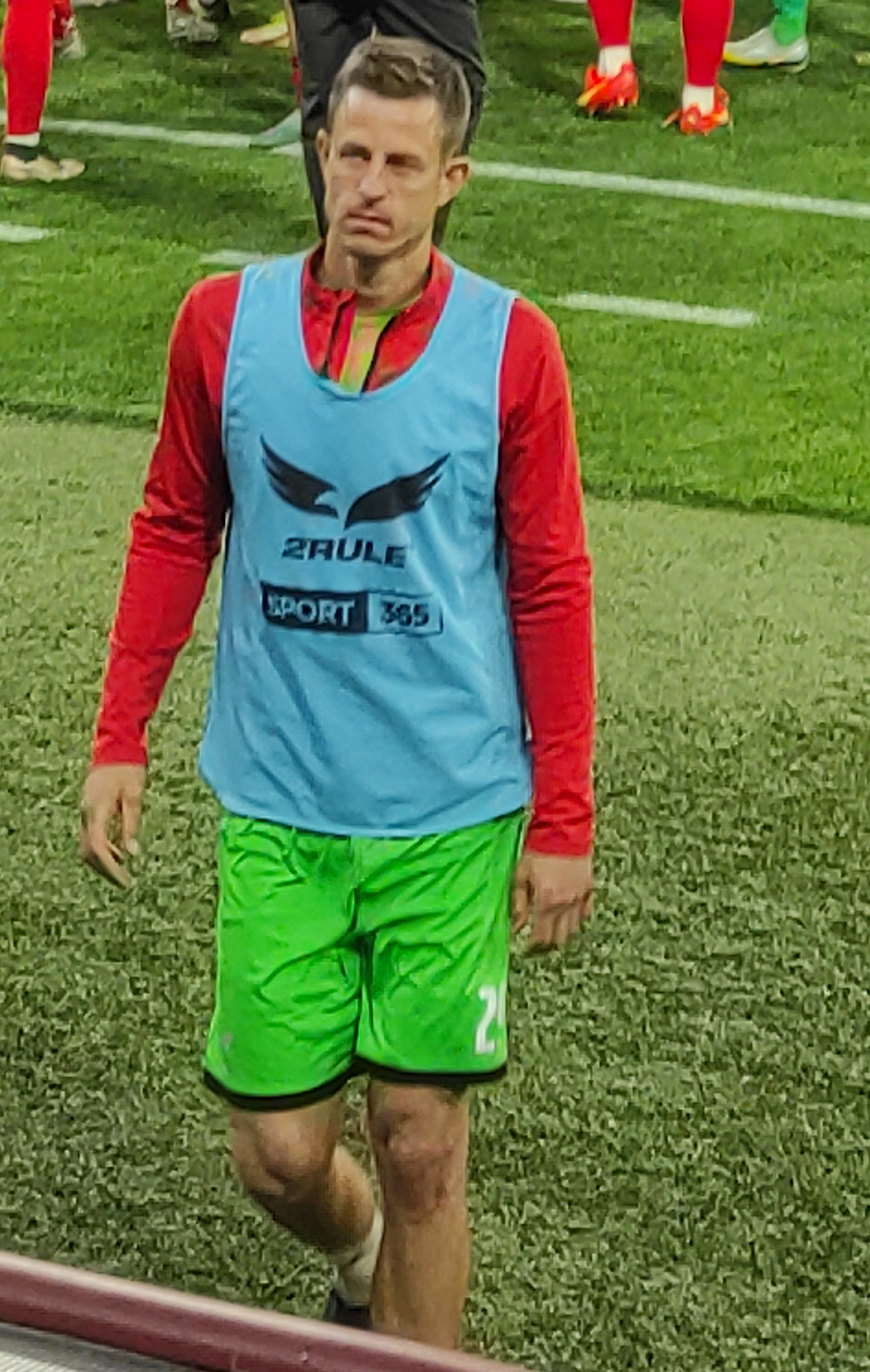
- Horváth with Budafok in 2023

Personal information
- Date of birth: 3 February 1988 (age 38)
- Place of birth: Kerepestarcsa, Hungary
- Height: 1.97 m (6 ft 6 in)
- Position: Goalkeeper

Team information
- Current team: Budafok
- Number: 29

Youth career
- 2002–2007: MTK Budapest

Senior career*
Years	Team	Apps	(Gls)
2007–2011	MTK Budapest	0	(0)
2007	→ Szigetszentmiklós (loan)	3	(0)
2007–2011	→ MTK Budapest II	37	(0)
2011–2013	Vasas	0	(0)
2011–2013	→ Vasas II	12	(0)
2013–2014	Hatvan	29	(0)
2014–2022	Budapest Honvéd	26	(0)
2014–2022	→ Budapest Honvéd II	37	(0)
2021–2022	→ Budafok (loan)	17	(0)
2022–	Budafok	15	(0)
- * Club domestic league appearances and goals as of 31 May 2026

András Horváth (born 3 February 1988) is a Hungarian professional footballer who plays for Budafok.

== Honours ==
Budafok

- Magyar Kupa runner-up: 2022–23
