= Gergő Nagy (footballer) =

Hungarian footballer

Personal information
- Date of birth: 7 January 1993 (age 33)
- Place of birth: Gyula, Hungary
- Height: 1.72 m (5 ft 7 1/2 in)
- Position: Midfielder

Team information
- Current team: Békéscsaba
- Number: 6

Youth career
- 2003–2005: Gyula
- 2005–2007: Békéscsaba
- 2007–2010: Budapest Honvéd

Senior career*
Years	Team	Apps	(Gls)
2010–2022	Budapest Honvéd	218	(7)
2010–2022	→ Budapest Honvéd II	47	(2)
2022–2024	Mezőkövesd	26	(0)
2024–2025	KFC Komárno	10	(0)
2025–	Békéscsaba	16	(1)

International career^{‡}
2009	Hungary U-17	5	(0)
2011	Hungary U-18	6	(0)
2011	Hungary U-19	4	(0)
2014	Hungary U-21	1	(0)
- * Club domestic league appearances and goals as of 31 May 2026 ‡ National team caps and goals as of 5 March 2014

Gergő Nagy (born 7 January 1993) is a Hungarian football player who plays for Békéscsaba.

== Club career ==
In June 2022, Nagy signed with Mezőkövesd.

== Career statistics ==
Appearances and goals by club, season and competition
Club	Season	League			Cup		League Cup		Europe		Total	
Club	Season	Division	Apps	Goals	Apps	Goals	Apps	Goals	Apps	Goals	Apps	Goals
Honvéd
Honvéd	2010–11	Nemzeti Bajnokság I	13	0	3	0	2	1	0	0	18	1
Honvéd	2011–12	Nemzeti Bajnokság I	0	0	0	0	1	0	0	0	1	0
Honvéd	2012–13	Nemzeti Bajnokság I	15	3	2	0	4	0	0	0	21	3
Honvéd	2013–14	Nemzeti Bajnokság I	22	1	0	0	2	0	2	0	26	1
Honvéd	2014–15	Nemzeti Bajnokság I	21	0	2	0	3	0	—		26	0
Honvéd	2015–16	Nemzeti Bajnokság I	32	2	2	0	—		—		34	2
Honvéd	2016–17	Nemzeti Bajnokság I	19	1	5	0	—		—		24	1
Honvéd	2017–18	Nemzeti Bajnokság I	19	0	3	0	—		2	0	24	0
Honvéd	2018–19	Nemzeti Bajnokság I	25	0	7	0	—		4	1	36	1
Honvéd	2019–20	Nemzeti Bajnokság I	25	0	10	0	—		0	0	35	0
Honvéd	2020–21	Nemzeti Bajnokság I	11	0	4	1	—		0	0	15	1
Honvéd	2021–22	Nemzeti Bajnokság I	16	0	2	0	—		—		18	0
Honvéd	Total		218	7	40	1	12	1	8	1	278	10
Career total			218	7	40	1	12	1	8	1	278	10

Updated to games played as of 15 May 2022.

== Honours ==
Honvéd

- Nemzeti Bajnokság I: 2016–17
- Hungarian Cup: 2019-20
