= Richárd Vernes =

Hungarian footballer

Personal information
- Date of birth: 24 February 1992 (age 34)
- Place of birth: Budapest, Hungary
- Height: 1.80 m (5 ft 11 in)
- Positions: Forward; winger

Team information
- Current team: Budapest Honvéd
- Number: 77

Youth career
- 2004–2007: Ferencváros
- 2007–2010: Budapest Honvéd

Senior career*
Years	Team	Apps	(Gls)
2010–2013	Budapest Honvéd II	32	(6)
2010–2017	Budapest Honvéd	81	(12)
2014–2015	→ Central Coast Mariners (loan)	8	(1)
2016–2017	→ Paks (loan)	16	(1)
2017–2018	Zalaegerszeg	33	(14)
2018–2019	Diósgyőr	28	(7)
2019	Hapoel Kfar Saba	4	(0)
2020–2022	Vasas	30	(6)
2021–2022	→ Győri ETO (loan)	19	(3)
2023–2024	BVSC-Zugló	26	(4)
2024–2025	Budapest Honvéd	7	(0)

International career
2012	Hungary U-20	2	(1)
2012–2014	Hungary U-21	6	(1)
- * Club domestic league appearances and goals as of 4 May 2025

Richárd Vernes (born 24 February 1992) is a Hungarian footballer who plays for Budapest Honvéd.

== Club career ==
On 1 September 2021, Vernes joined Győri ETO on a season-long loan.

In February 2023, Vernes moved to BVSC-Zugló in the third-tier Nemzeti Bajnokság III.

== Career statistics ==
As of matches played 4 May 2025

Appearances and goals by club, season and competition
Club	Season	League			Cup		League Cup		Continental		Other		Total	
Club	Season	Divisioin	Apps	Goals	Apps	Goals	Apps	Goals	Apps	Goals	Apps	Goals	Apps	Goals
Honvéd	2009–10	NB I	0	0	0	0	1	0	0	0	—		1	0
Honvéd	2010–11	NB I	1	0	3	2	1	0	—		—		5	2
Honvéd	2011–12	NB I	4	0	1	0	2	1	—		—		7	1
Honvéd	2012–13	NB I	22	5	5	4	4	3	4	2	—		35	14
Honvéd	2013–14	NB I	19	4	3	1	1	1	1	0	—		24	6
Honvéd	2015–16	NB I	27	3	5	0	—		—		—		32	3
Honvéd	2016–17	NB I	6	0	0	0	—		—		—		6	0
Honvéd	Total		81	12	17	7	9	5	5	2	—		110	26
Central Coast Mariners (loan)	2014–15	A-League	8	1	—		—		0	0	—		8	1
Paks (loan)	2016–17	NB I	16	1	1	0	—		—		—		17	1
Zalaegerszeg	2017–18	NB II	33	14	5	2	—		—		—		38	16
Diósgyőr	2018–19	NB I	28	7	2	2	—		—		—		30	9
Hapoel Kfar Saba	2019–20	Israeli Premier League	4	0	0	0	5	0	—		—		9	0
Vasas	2019–20	NB I	4	2	—		—		—		—		4	2
Vasas	2020–21	NB I	26	4	1	1	—		—		—		27	5
Vasas	Total		30	6	1	1	—		—		—		31	7
Zalaegerszeg	2021–22	NB II	19	3	3	1	—		—		—		22	4
Vasas	2022–23	NB III	15	3	0	0	—		—		2	0	17	3
Vasas	2023–24	NB II	11	1	0	0	—		—		—		11	1
Vasas	Total		26	4	0	0	—		—		2	0	28	4
Honvéd	2024–25	NB II	7	0	0	0	—		—		—		7	0
Career total			252	48	29	13	9	5	5	2	2	0	301	68
