= Dávid Bobál =

Hungarian footballer (born 1995)

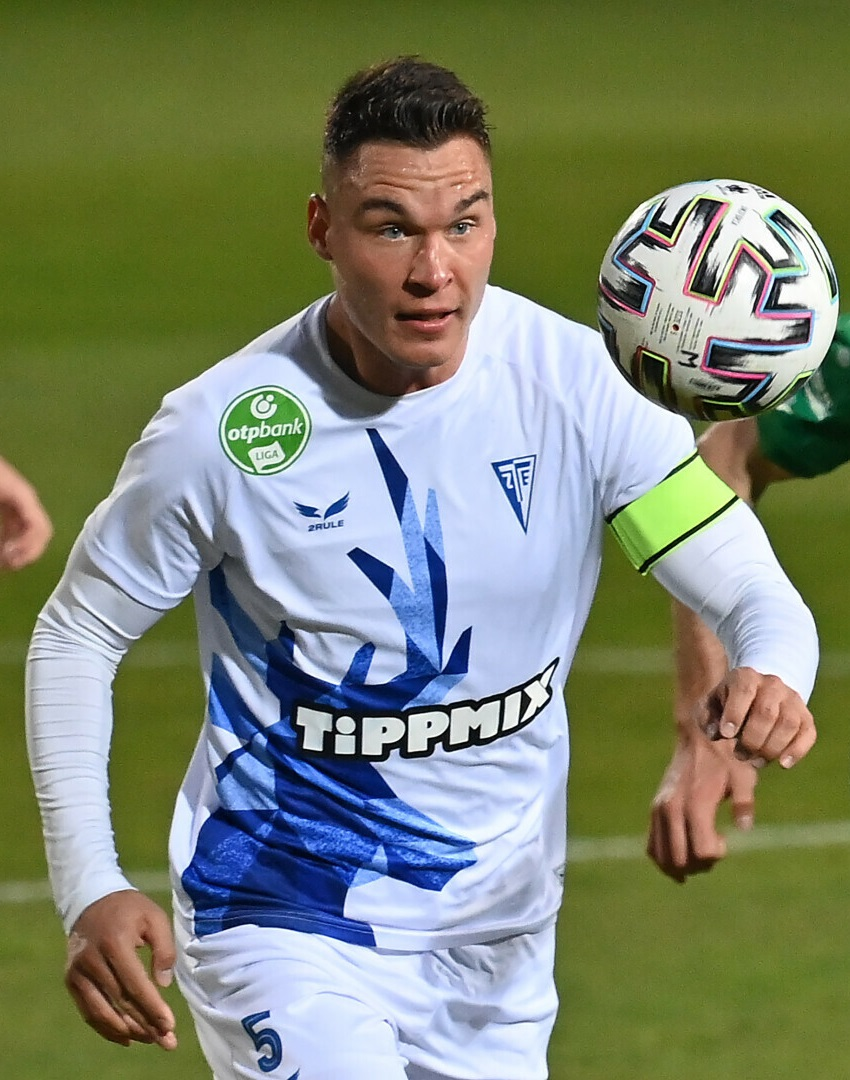
- Bobál playing for Zalaegerszeg in 2021

Personal information
- Date of birth: 31 August 1995 (age 31)
- Place of birth: Pásztó, Hungary
- Height: 1.87 m (6 ft 2 in)
- Position: Centre back

Team information
- Current team: MTK Budapest
- Number: 4

Youth career
- 2003–2007: Salgótarján
- 2007–2010: Vasas
- 2010–2014: Honvéd

Senior career*
Years	Team	Apps	(Gls)
2014–2018	Honvéd	78	(6)
2013–2018	→ Honvéd II	28	(4)
2014–2015	→ Soproni VSE (loan)	24	(1)
2018	Dukla Prague	0	(0)
2019	Paks	5	(0)
2019–2022	Zalaegerszeg	66	(1)
2022–2023	Mezőkövesd	9	(0)
2023	→ MTK Budapest (loan)	17	(0)
2023–	MTK Budapest	15	(1)

International career
2010–2011	Hungary U16	6	(0)
2011–2012	Hungary U17	1	(0)
2013–2015	Hungary U19	1	(0)
2016	Hungary U21	6	(0)
- * Club domestic league appearances and goals as of 19 June 2025

Dávid Bobál (born 31 August 1995) is a Hungarian football player who plays for MTK Budapest.

== Club career ==
On 3 January 2023, Bobál moved on loan to MTK Budapest. On 2 June 2023, the loan-deal agreement was made permanent.

== International career ==
Bobál was part of the Hungary under-19 national team at the 2014 UEFA European Under-19 Championship.

== Career statistics ==
Appearances and goals by club, season and competition
Club	Season	League			Cup		League Cup		Europe		Total	
Club	Season	Division	Apps	Goals	Apps	Goals	Apps	Goals	Apps	Goals	Apps	Goals
Honvéd II
Honvéd II	2013–14	Nemzeti Bajnokság III	25	4	—		—		—		25	4
Honvéd II	2014–15	Nemzeti Bajnokság II	2	0	—		—		—		2	0
Honvéd II	2016–17	Nemzeti Bajnokság III	1	0	—		—		—		1	0
Honvéd II	Total		28	4	0	0	0	0	0	0	28	4
Sopron	2014–15	Nemzeti Bajnokság I	24	1	0	0	5	1	—		29	2
Honvéd
Honvéd	2013–14	Nemzeti Bajnokság I	1	0	1	0	2	0	—		4	0
Honvéd	2015–16	Nemzeti Bajnokság I	31	2	1	0	—		—		32	2
Honvéd	2016–17	Nemzeti Bajnokság I	24	2	2	0	—		—		26	2
Honvéd	2017–18	Nemzeti Bajnokság I	22	2	1	0	—		2	0	25	2
Honvéd	Total		78	6	5	0	2	0	2	0	87	6
Paks	2018–19	Nemzeti Bajnokság I	5	0	2	0	—		—		7	0
Zalaegerszeg	2019–20	Nemzeti Bajnokság I	25	1	6	0	—		—		31	1
Career total			160	12	13	0	7	1	2	0	182	13

Updated to games played as of 27 June 2020.
