= Endre Botka =

Hungarian footballer (born 1994)

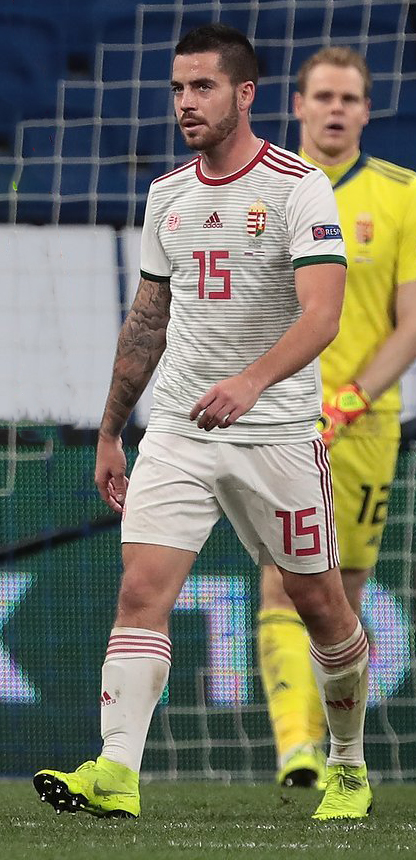
- Botka in 2020

Personal information
- Full name: Endre Botka
- Date of birth: 25 August 1994 (age 32)
- Place of birth: Budapest, Hungary
- Height: 1.77 m (5 ft 10 in)
- Position: Right back

Team information
- Current team: Ferencváros
- Number: 21

Youth career
- 2007–2014: Honvéd

Senior career*
Years	Team	Apps	(Gls)
2013–2017	Honvéd	61	(1)
2014	→ Kecskemét (loan)	15	(1)
2017–	Ferencváros	164	(7)
2025	→ Kecskemét (loan)	12	(0)

International career^{‡}
2009–2010	Hungary U-16		
2012–2013	Hungary U-19		
2013–2014	Hungary U-20	1	(0)
2014	Hungary U-21	4	(0)
2016–2024	Hungary	30	(1)
- * Club domestic league appearances and goals as of 19 January 2026 ‡ National team caps and goals as of 14 October 2024 (UTC)

Endre Botka (born 25 August 1994) is a Hungarian professional footballer who plays as a right-back for Ferencvárosi TC.

== Club career ==
Botka was born in Budapest.

=== Ferencváros ===
In February 2020, he signed an undisclosed contract extension with Ferencváros.

On 16 June 2020, he became champion with Ferencváros by beating Budapest Honvéd at the Hidegkuti Nándor Stadion on the 30th match day of the 2019–20 Nemzeti Bajnokság I season.

On 29 September 2020, he was member of the Ferencváros team which qualified for the 2020–21 UEFA Champions League group stage after beating Molde FK on 3–3 aggregate (away goals) at the Groupama Aréna.

On 20 April 2021, he won the 2020–21 Nemzeti Bajnokság I season with Ferencváros by beating archrival Újpest FC 3–0 at the Groupama Aréna. The goals were scored by Myrto Uzuni (3rd and 77th minute) and Tokmac Nguen (30th minute).

On 5 May 2023, he won the 2022–23 Nemzeti Bajnokság I with Ferencváros, after Kecskemét lost 1–0 to Budapest Honvéd at the Bozsik Aréna on the 30th matchday.

On 20 April 2024, the Ferencváros–Kisvárda tie ended with a goalless draw at the Groupama Aréna on the 29th match day of the 2023–24 Nemzeti Bajnokság I season which meant that Ferencváros won their 35th championship.

On 15 May 2024, Ferencváros were defeated by Paks 2–0 in the 2024 Magyar Kupa Final at the Puskás Aréna.

== International career ==
He received his first call up to the senior Hungary squad for the UEFA Euro 2016 qualifiers against Romania and Northern Ireland in September 2015. He made his debut for the national team as a substitute in a 2–0 loss to Sweden on 15 November 2016.

On 1 June 2021, Botka was included in the final 26-man squad to represent Hungary at the rescheduled UEFA Euro 2020 tournament. He started all three matches as Hungary finished bottom of Group F.

On 8 September 2021, Botka scored his first goal for Hungary in a 2–1 win over Andorra during 2022 FIFA World Cup qualification.

On 14 May 2024, Botka was named in Hungary's squad for UEFA Euro 2024. He made one appearance, starting in central defence in the 1–0 win over Scotland on 24 June.

== Career statistics ==
=== Club ===
As of match played 16 August 2025

Appearances and goals by club, season and competition
Club	Season	League			National cup		League cup		Europe		Total	
Club	Season	Division	Apps	Goals	Apps	Goals	Apps	Goals	Apps	Goals	Apps	Goals
Honvéd	2013–14	Nemzeti Bajnokság I	3	0	0	0	2	0	0	0	5	0
Honvéd	2014–15	Nemzeti Bajnokság I	10	0	0	0	1	0	0	0	11	0
Honvéd	2015–16	Nemzeti Bajnokság I	31	1	1	0	0	0	0	0	32	1
Honvéd	2016–17	Nemzeti Bajnokság I	17	0	0	0	0	0	0	0	17	0
Honvéd	Total		61	1	1	0	3	0	0	0	65	1
Kecskemét	2014–15	Nemzeti Bajnokság I	15	1	3	1	3	0	0	0	21	2
Ferencváros	2016–17	Nemzeti Bajnokság I	10	0	3	0	–		0	0	13	0
Ferencváros	2017–18	Nemzeti Bajnokság I	28	0	2	1	–		3	1	33	2
Ferencváros	2018–19	Nemzeti Bajnokság I	11	0	3	0	–		1	0	15	0
Ferencváros	2019–20	Nemzeti Bajnokság I	22	1	1	0	–		4	0	27	1
Ferencváros	2020–21	Nemzeti Bajnokság I	19	0	2	0	–		11	0	32	0
Ferencváros	2021–22	Nemzeti Bajnokság I	25	2	4	1	–		6	0	35	3
Ferencváros	2022–23	Nemzeti Bajnokság I	23	3	1	0	–		11	0	35	3
Ferencváros	2023–24	Nemzeti Bajnokság I	18	1	5	0	–		7 (Note: Five appearances in UEFA Europa Conference League, two appearances in UEFA Champions League)	0	30	1
Ferencváros	2024–25	Nemzeti Bajnokság I	5	0	0	0	–		5 (Note: Two appearances in UEFA Champions League, three appearances in UEFA Europa League)	0	10	0
Ferencváros	2025–26	Nemzeti Bajnokság I	3	0	0	0	–		0	0	3	0
Ferencváros	Total		164	7	21	2	0	0	48	1	233	10
Kecskemét	2024–25	NB I	12	0	–		–		–		12	0
Career total			252	9	25	3	6	0	48	1	327	13

=== International ===
As of match played 14 October 2024

Appearances and goals by national team and year
National team	Year	Apps	Goals
Hungary	2016	1	0
Hungary	2018	1	0
Hungary	2020	6	0
Hungary	2021	9	1
Hungary	2022	3	0
Hungary	2023	5	0
Hungary	2024	5	0
Total		30	1

As of match played on 8 September 2021
Scores and results list Hungary's goal tally first, score column indicates score after each Botka goal.

List of international goals scored by Endre Botka
No.	Date	Venue	Opponent	Score	Result	Competition
1	8 September 2021	Puskás Aréna, Budapest, Hungary	Andorra	2–0	2–1	2022 FIFA World Cup qualification

== Honours ==
Honvéd

- Nemzeti Bajnokság I: 2016–17

Ferencvárosi TC

- Nemzeti Bajnokság I: 2018–19, 2019–20, 2020–21, 2021–22, 2022–23, 2023–24
- Hungarian Cup: 2016–17, 2021–22
