= Dušan Vasiljević =

Serbian footballer

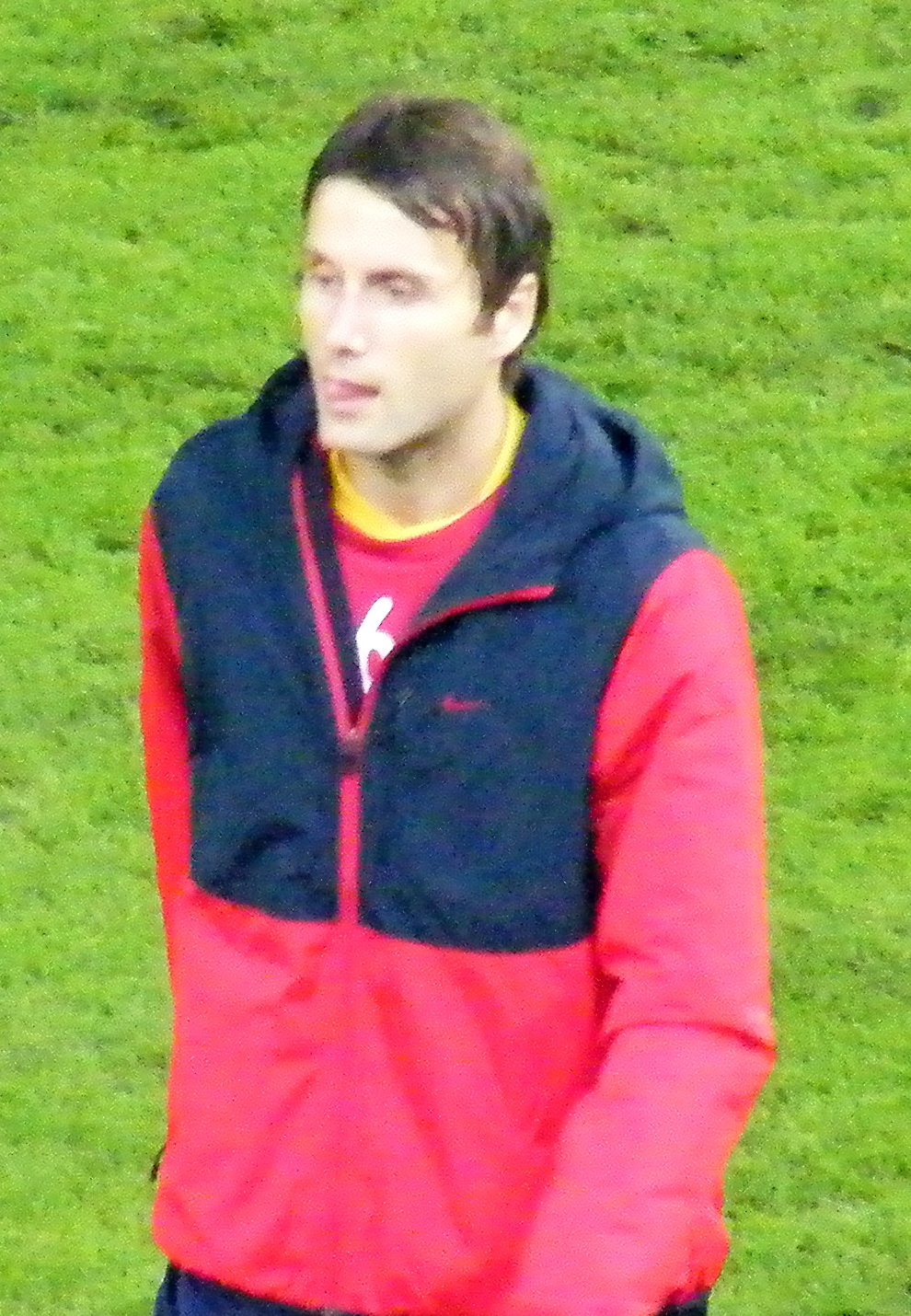

Personal information
- Date of birth: 7 May 1982 (age 44)
- Place of birth: Belgrade, SFR Yugoslavia
- Height: 1.86 m (6 ft 1 in)
- Position: Attacking midfielder

Senior career*
Years	Team	Apps	(Gls)
2000–2002	Kolubara		
2002–2003	Mogren	25	(9)
2003–2004	Obrenovac	6	(0)
2004–2005	Békéscsaba	25	(2)
2005–2007	Kaposvár	57	(11)
2008–2009	Energie Cottbus	24	(0)
2009–2010	Slavia Prague	9	(0)
2010	Újpest	15	(4)
2010–2012	Videoton	40	(6)
2012–2015	Újpest	90	(22)
2015–2017	Honvéd	37	(3)
2017	Budafok	7	(0)
Total		335	(57)
- * Club domestic league appearances and goals as of 8 April 2018

Dušan Vasiljević (born 7 May 1982) is a Serbian football player who most recently played for Budafoki MTE.

== Honours ==
Champion 2010/11,🇭🇺 (Videoton) ! 2X Super Cup🇭🇺 (Videoton /Ujpest ) (Hungary) Újpest

- Hungarian Cup (1): 2013–14
