= George Ikenne =

Nigerian footballer

Personal information
- Full name: George Patrick Ikenne-King
- Date of birth: 29 October 1991 (age 35)
- Place of birth: Calabar, Nigeria
- Height: 1.72 m (5 ft 8 in)
- Position: Right back

Youth career
- Flying Sports Academy

Senior career*
Years	Team	Apps	(Gls)
2012–2018	Honvéd	104	(0)
2012–2013	Honvéd II	11	(1)
2018–2021	MTK Budapest	33	(1)
2019–2020	→ Honvéd (loan)	13	(0)
2022	Mezőkövesd	5	(0)
- * Club domestic league appearances and goals

George Patrick Ikenne-King (born 29 October 1991) is a Nigerian former football player.

== Club career ==
On 6 January 2022, Ikenne joined Mezőkövesd.

== Club statistics ==
Club	Season	League		Cup		League Cup		Europe		Total	
Club	Season	Apps	Goals	Apps	Goals	Apps	Goals	Apps	Goals	Apps	Goals
Honvéd
Honvéd	2012–13	14	0	3	0	4	0	–	–	21	0
Honvéd	2013–14	22	0	2	0	3	1	3	0	30	1
Honvéd	2014–15	26	0	2	0	6	0	–	–	34	0
Honvéd	2015–16	11	0	2	0	–	–	–	–	13	0
Honvéd	2016–17	21	0	3	0	–	–	–	–	24	0
Honvéd	2017–18	10	0	2	0	–	–	1	0	13	0
Honvéd	2019–20	13	0	4	0	–	–	1	0	18	0
Honvéd	Total	116	0	18	0	13	1	5	0	152	1
MTK Budapest
MTK Budapest	2018–19	7	0	1	0	–	–	–	–	8	0
MTK Budapest	2020–21	26	1	4	2	–	–	–	–	30	3
MTK Budapest	Total	33	1	5	2	0	0	0	0	38	3
Career Total		150	1	23	2	13	1	5	0	191	4

Updated to games played as of 15 May 2021.
