= Dániel Prosser =

Hungarian footballer (born 1994)

Personal information
- Full name: Dániel Bálint Prosser
- Date of birth: 15 June 1994 (age 32)
- Place of birth: Budapest, Hungary
- Height: 1.75 m (5 ft 9 in)
- Position: Attacking midfielder

Team information
- Current team: Kazincbarcika
- Number: 17

Youth career
- 2007–2013: Honvéd

Senior career*
Years	Team	Apps	(Gls)
2013–2017	Honvéd	63	(7)
2017–2019	Puskás Akadémia	31	(8)
2018	→ Sepsi OSK (loan)	2	(0)
2019	→ Diósgyőr (loan)	12	(3)
2019–2020	Diósgyőr	16	(1)
2020–2022	MTK Budapest	40	(9)
2021–2022	→ SønderjyskE (loan)	11	(2)
2023–2024	Szeged-Csanád	29	(1)
2025–	Kazincbarcika	3	(0)

International career
2014	Hungary U17	2	(0)
2014–2015	Hungary U21	5	(5)
- * Club domestic league appearances and goals as of 21 December 2025

Dániel Prosser (born 15 June 1994) is a Hungarian football player who plays as an attacking midfielder on Hungarian club Kazincbarcika.

== Club career ==
On 15 January 2023, Prosser signed with Szeged-Csanád.

On 3 July 2025, Prosser signed with Hungarian club Kazincbarcika.

== Career statistics ==
As of match played 22 August 2021

Appearances and goals by club, season and competition
Club	Season	League			Cup		League Cup		Europe		Total	
Club	Season	Division	Apps	Goals	Apps	Goals	Apps	Goals	Apps	Goals	Apps	Goals
Honvéd	2013–14	Nemzeti Bajnokság I	11	1	2	0	5	1	—		18	2
Honvéd	2014–15	Nemzeti Bajnokság I	22	2	3	2	6	1	—		31	5
Honvéd	2015–16	Nemzeti Bajnokság I	19	1	2	1	—		—		21	2
Honvéd	2016–17	Nemzeti Bajnokság I	11	4	3	4	—		—		14	8
Honvéd	Total		63	8	10	7	11	2	0	0	84	17
Puskás Akadémia	2016–17	Nemzeti Bajnokság II	18	7	0	0	—		—		18	7
Puskás Akadémia	2017–18	Nemzeti Bajnokság I	13	1	7	4	—		—		20	5
Puskás Akadémia	Total		31	8	7	4	0	0	0	0	38	12
Sepsi	2018–19	Liga I	2	0	2	2	—		—		4	2
Diósgyőr	2018–19	Nemzeti Bajnokság I	12	3	0	0	—		—		12	3
Diósgyőr	2019–20	Nemzeti Bajnokság I	16	1	3	0	—		—		19	1
Diósgyőr	Total		28	4	3	0	0	0	0	0	31	4
MTK Budapest	2019–20	Nemzeti Bajnokság II	7	5	5	1	—		—		12	6
MTK Budapest	2020–21	Nemzeti Bajnokság I	29	4	6	6	—		—		35	10
MTK Budapest	2021–22	Nemzeti Bajnokság I	4	0	0	0	—		—		4	0
MTK Budapest	Total		40	9	11	7	0	0	0	0	51	16
Career total			164	29	33	20	11	2	0	0	208	51
