= Oleksandr Nad =

Ukrainian footballer

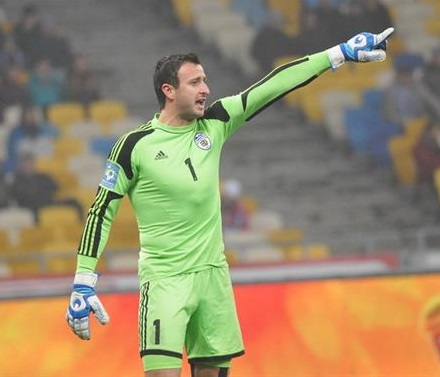
- Nad in 2013

Personal information
- Full name: Oleksandr Arpadovych Nad
- Date of birth: 2 September 1985 (age 41)
- Place of birth: Uzhhorod, Ukrainian SSR, Soviet Union
- Height: 1.90 m (6 ft 3 in)
- Position: Goalkeeper

Youth career
- 1999–2002: Youth Sportive School Uzhhorod

Senior career*
Years	Team	Apps	(Gls)
2003–2015	Hoverla Uzhhorod	104	(0)
2015	Bihor Oradea	7	(0)
2016	Budapest Honvéd	1	(0)
2017	Gyirmót	9	(0)
2017–2020	Debrecen	78	(0)
2020–2021	Budapest Honvéd	0	(0)
2022–2023	Nyíregyháza	5	(0)
- * Club domestic league appearances and goals as of 5 February 2023

Oleksandr Arpadovych Nad (Ukrainian: Олександр Арпадович Надь; Hungarian: Nagy Sándor; born 2 September 1985) is a Ukrainian footballer.

== Club career ==
Nad's contract with Nyíregyháza was terminated by mutual consent in February 2023.
