= Ivan Lovrić (footballer) =

Croatian footballer (born 1985)

Personal information
- Date of birth: 11 July 1985 (age 41)
- Place of birth: Split, SR Croatia
- Height: 1.92 m (6 ft 3 1/2 in)
- Position: Centre-back

Team information
- Current team: Honvéd
- Number: 25

Youth career
- Omladinac Vranjic
- 2002–2003: Uskok Klis

Senior career*
Years	Team	Apps	(Gls)
2004–2005	Omladinac Vranjic		
2005	Jadran Kaštel Sućurac		
2006	Ogulin		
2006–2007	GOŠK Kaštel Gomilica	3	(0)
2007–2009	Kecskemét	26	(4)
2009	→ Baja (loan)	14	(1)
2009–2011	Warriors	31	(2)
2011–2014	Budapest Honvéd	92	(10)
2014–2015	Kecskemét	26	(0)
2015–	Budapest Honvéd	187	(3)
- * Club domestic league appearances and goals as of 21 December 2023

Ivan Lovrić (Croatian pronunciation: [ǐʋan lǒːʋrit͡ɕ]; born 11 July 1985) is a Croatian professional footballer who plays as a centre-back for Hungarian club Budapest Honvéd.

== Club statistics ==
Club	Season	League		Cup		League Cup		Europe		Total	
Club	Season	Apps	Goals	Apps	Goals	Apps	Goals	Apps	Goals	Apps	Goals
Kecskemét
Kecskemét	2007–08	21	4	0	0	0	0	0	0	21	4
Kecskemét	2008–09	5	0	1	0	0	0	0	0	6	0
Kecskemét	2014–15	27	0	1	0	2	0	0	0	30	0
Kecskemét	Total	52	4	2	0	2	0	0	0	56	4
Baja
Baja	2008–09	14	1	0	0	0	0	0	0	14	1
Baja	Total	14	1	0	0	0	0	0	0	14	1
Warriors
Warriors	2010	31	2	1	0	1	1	7	1	40	4
Warriors	Total	31	2	1	0	1	1	7	1	40	4
Honvéd
Honvéd	2010–11	13	4	2	0	0	0	0	0	15	4
Honvéd	2011–12	29	2	1	0	4	0	0	0	34	2
Honvéd	2012–13	26	1	3	0	5	0	4	0	38	1
Honvéd	2013–14	24	3	2	0	5	0	4	0	35	3
Honvéd	2015–16	21	0	5	1	–	–	–	–	26	1
Honvéd	2016–17	26	0	5	0	–	–	–	–	31	0
Honvéd	2017–18	20	0	5	0	–	–	2	0	27	0
Honvéd	2018–19	11	2	9	2	–	–	0	0	20	4
Honvéd	2019–20	29	0	6	1	–	–	4	0	39	1
Honvéd	2020–21	26	1	3	0	–	–	1	0	30	1
Honvéd	2021–22	25	0	4	0	–	–	–	–	29	0
Honvéd	Total	252	13	45	4	14	0	15	0	326	17
Career Total		350	20'	48	4	17	1	22	1	437	26

Updated to games played as of 15 May 2022.
