= Filip Holender =

Hungarian footballer (born 1994)

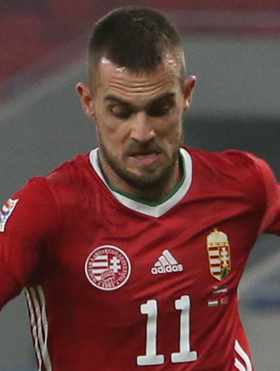
- Holender with Hungary in 2020

Personal information
- Date of birth: 27 July 1994 (age 32)
- Place of birth: Kragujevac, FR Yugoslavia
- Height: 1.80 m (5 ft 11 in)
- Position: Forward

Team information
- Current team: Spartak Subotica
- Number: 18

Youth career
- ŠF Fitness Kragujevac
- 2007–2009: Radnički Kragujevac
- 2009–2013: Honvéd

Senior career*
Years	Team	Apps	(Gls)
2013–2019	Honvéd	159	(30)
2019–2020	FC Lugano	29	(5)
2020–2021	→ Partizan (loan)	26	(8)
2021–2022	Partizan	23	(3)
2022–2026	Vasas	60	(13)
2024–2026	→ Fehérvár (loan)	28	(1)
2026–	Spartak Subotica	9	(1)

International career^{‡}
2014–2016	Hungary U21	4	(0)
2018–2021	Hungary	16	(1)
- * Club domestic league appearances and goals as of 13 June 2026 ‡ National team caps and goals as of 23:22, 22 June 2021 (UTC)

Filip Holender (Hungarian: Holender Filip; Serbian Cyrillic: Филип Холендер; born 27 July 1994) is a Hungarian professional footballer who plays as a forward for Spartak Subotica.

== Club career ==
=== Budapest Honvéd ===
During his career at Budapest Honvéd Holender scored 30 goals in 159 matches.

=== Lugano ===
On 21 July 2019, Holender played his first match in Lugano against FC Zürich in 4–0 away victory for Lugano in the 2019–20 Swiss Super League. On 25 August 2019, he scored two goals against St. Gallen on the 5th match day, although Lugano lost 3–2 at the Kybunpark, St. Gallen.

=== Partizan ===
By early October, Holender agreed to a loan deal to Serbian side FK Partizan.

== International career ==
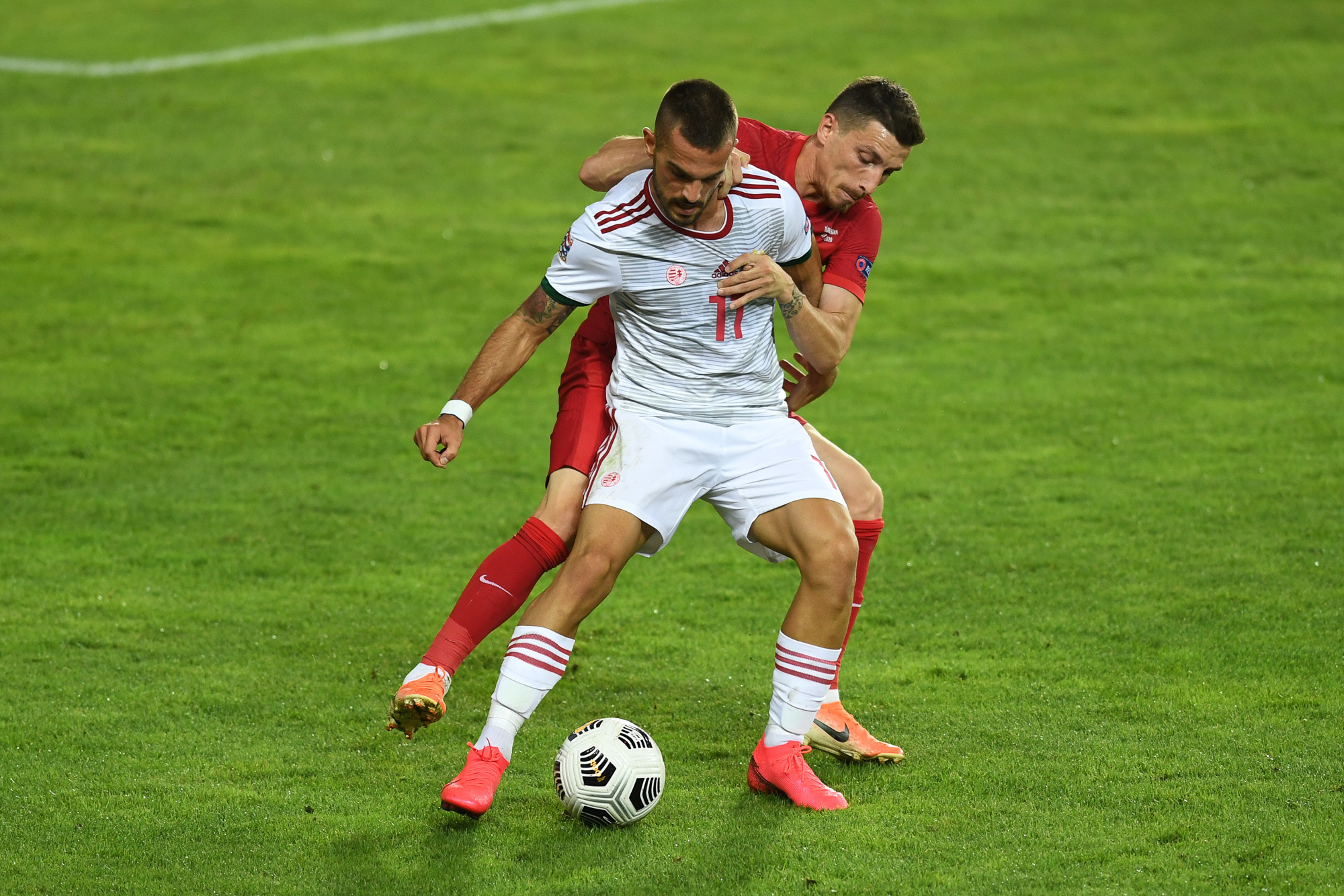
Holander in action for Hungary national football team in 2020

Holender was born in Kragujevac, FR Yugoslavia (today in Serbia) and his grandfather was Hungarian. He decided to represent Hungary internationally, and debuted for the Hungary national under 21 team at 8 September 2014.

He made his debut for the senior national team on 18 November 2018 in a 2018–19 UEFA Nations League C game against Finland.

On 5 September 2019, he scored his first goal in a friendly match against Montenegro at the Podgorica City Stadium, Podgorica, Montenegro.

On 1 June 2021, Holender was included in the final 26-man squad to represent Hungary at the rescheduled UEFA Euro 2020 tournament.

== Career statistics ==
=== Club ===
As of matches played 15 July 2022

Appearances and goals by club, season and competition
Club	Season	League			National cup		League cup		Europe		Total	
Club	Season	Division	Apps	Goals	Apps	Goals	Apps	Goals	Apps	Goals	Apps	Goals
Honvéd	2012–13	Nemzeti Bajnokság I	5	0	0	0	1	0	0	0	6	0
Honvéd	2013–14	Nemzeti Bajnokság I	23	3	3	1	4	0	3	3	33	7
Honvéd	2014–15	Nemzeti Bajnokság I	20	3	2	0	4	0	0	0	26	3
Honvéd	2015–16	Nemzeti Bajnokság I	28	2	2	1	—		0	0	30	3
Honvéd	2016–17	Nemzeti Bajnokság I	27	2	4	3	—		0	0	31	5
Honvéd	2017–18	Nemzeti Bajnokság I	23	4	7	1	—		0	0	30	5
Honvéd	2018–19	Nemzeti Bajnokság I	33	16	5	3	—		4	2	42	21
Honvéd	Total		159	30	23	9	9	0	7	5	198	44
Lugano	2019–20	Swiss Super League	27	5	1	0	—		5	0	33	5
Lugano	2020–21	Swiss Super League	2	0	1	0	—		0	0	3	0
Lugano	Total		29	5	2	0	—		5	0	36	5
Partizan (loan)	2020–21	Serbian SuperLiga	26	9	4	0	—		0	0	30	9
Partizan	2021–22	Serbian SuperLiga	22	3	3	0	—		13	0	38	3
Partizan	2022–23	Serbian SuperLiga	1	0	0	0	—		0	0	1	0
Partizan	Total		49	12	7	0	—		13	0	69	12
Career total			237	46	32	9	9	0	25	5	303	61

=== International ===
Appearances and goals by national team and year
National team	Year	Apps	Goals
Hungary	2018	1	0
Hungary	2019	5	1
Hungary	2020	8	0
Hungary	2021	2	0
Total		16	1

Scores and results list Hungary's goal tally first, score column indicates score after each Holender goal.

List of international goals scored by Filip Holender
No.	Date	Venue	Cap	Opponent	Score	Result	Competition
1	5 September 2019	Podgorica City Stadium, Podgorica, Montenegro	4	Montenegro	1–0	1–2	Friendly

== Honours ==
Individual

- Serbian SuperLiga Player of the Week: 2020–21 (Round 16)
