= Loránd Szilágyi =

Romanian footballer

Personal information
- Full name: Loránd József Szilágyi
- Date of birth: 25 February 1987 (age 39)
- Place of birth: Târgu Mureș, Romania
- Height: 1.78 m (5 ft 10 in)
- Position: Left back

Senior career*
Years	Team	Apps	(Gls)
2004–2008	Transil Târgu Mureș	87	(2)
2008–2014	Târgu Mureș	101	(3)
2014–2015	Gaz Metan Mediaș	14	(0)
2015–2016	Honvéd	4	(0)
2015–2016	Honvéd II	13	(0)
2016–2017	Cigánd	28	(0)
2019	Iernut		
2020	Sângeorgiu de Pădure		
2021–2022	MSE Târgu Mureș	6	(0)
- * Club domestic league appearances and goals as of 13:16, 20 December 2022 (UTC)

Loránd Szilágyi (born 25 February 1987) is a Romanian football player.
