= Patrik Hidi =

Hungarian footballer (born 1990)

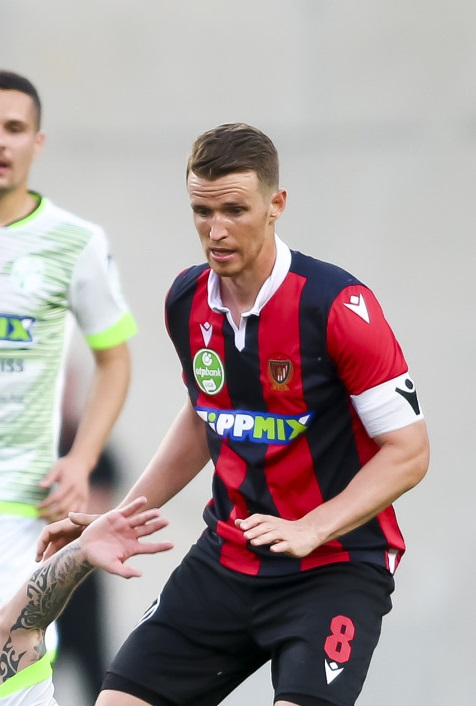
- Hidi playing for Honvéd in 2020

Personal information
- Date of birth: 27 November 1990 (age 35)
- Place of birth: Győr, Hungary
- Height: 1.86 m (6 ft 1 in)
- Position: Midfielder

Team information
- Current team: Karcagi
- Number: 26

Youth career
- Honvéd

Senior career*
Years	Team	Apps	(Gls)
2008–2017	Honvéd	194	(14)
2009–2012	Honvéd II	36	(0)
2017–2018	Oviedo	14	(0)
2018–2019	Honvéd	10	(0)
2019–2020	Irtysh	33	(1)
2020–2022	Honvéd	77	(8)
2022–2023	Vasas	33	(2)
2023–2025	BVSC-Zugló	53	(4)
2025–	Karcagi	21	(0)

International career
2008–2009	Hungary U19	1	(0)
2010–2013	Hungary U21	4	(0)
- * Club domestic league appearances and goals as of 31 May 2026

Patrik Hidi (born 27 November 1990) is a Hungarian footballer who plays as a central midfielder for Karcagi in the Nemzeti Bajnokság II.

== Club career ==
On 5 July 2022, Hidi signed a three-year contract with Vasas.

== Honours ==
Honvéd

- Magyar Kupa: 2008–09
- Szuperkupa: 2009

== Career statistics ==
Appearances and goals by club, season and competition
Club	Season	League		Cup		League Cup		Europe		Total	
Club	Season	Apps	Goals	Apps	Goals	Apps	Goals	Apps	Goals	Apps	Goals
Honvéd
Honvéd	2008–09	9	1	1	0	8	1	0	0	18	2
Honvéd	2009–10	8	0	3	0	4	0	0	0	15	0
Honvéd	2010–11	13	0	4	0	4	0	0	0	21	0
Honvéd	2011–12	25	1	1	0	2	0	0	0	28	1
Honvéd	2012–13	25	1	4	0	8	1	4	0	41	2
Honvéd	2013–14	28	3	1	0	3	0	4	0	36	3
Honvéd	2014–15	29	4	4	1	3	1	0	0	38	6
Honvéd	2015–16	29	1	4	1	–	–	–	–	33	2
Honvéd	2016–17	28	3	4	2	–	–	–	–	32	5
Honvéd	2018–19	10	0	1	2	–	–	0	0	11	2
Honvéd	2019–20	15	1	5	0	–	–	0	0	20	1
Honvéd	2020–21	30	4	1	0	–	–	2	0	33	4
Honvéd	2021–22	32	3	4	0	–	–	–	–	36	3
Honvéd	Total	281	22	37	6	34	3	10	0	362	31
Real Oviedo
Real Oviedo	2017–18	14	0	0	0	–	–	–	–	14	0
Real Oviedo	Total	14	0	0	0	0	0	0	0	14	0
Irtysh
Irtysh	2019	33	1	2	0	–	–	–	–	35	1
Irtysh	Total	33	1	2	0	0	0	0	0	35	1
Career total		328	23	39	6	34	3	10	0	411	32

Updated to games played as of 15 May 2022.
