= László Erdélyi =

Hungarian footballer

Personal information
- Date of birth: 10 July 1993 (age 33)
- Place of birth: Szentendre, Hungary
- Height: 1.84 m (6 ft 0 in)
- Position: Forward

Team information
- Current team: Soroksár
- Number: 63

Youth career
- 2004–2008: Vác
- 2008–2011: Honvéd

Senior career*
Years	Team	Apps	(Gls)
2011–2016	Budapest Honvéd	3	(0)
2013–2015	→ Sopron (loan)	51	(10)
2016–2017	Sopron	35	(8)
2017–2019	ETO Győr	28	(4)
2019–2021	Soroksár	46	(6)
2021–2022	BVSC-Zugló	29	(11)
2022	Balassagyarmat	6	(1)
2023–	Soroksár	13	(0)

International career
	Hungary U-18	6	(1)
2011–2012	Hungary U-19	5	(0)
- * Club domestic league appearances and goals as of 30 May 2023

László Erdélyi (born 10 July 1993) is a Hungarian football defender. He plays for Soroksár.
