= Szabolcs Kemenes =

Hungarian footballer

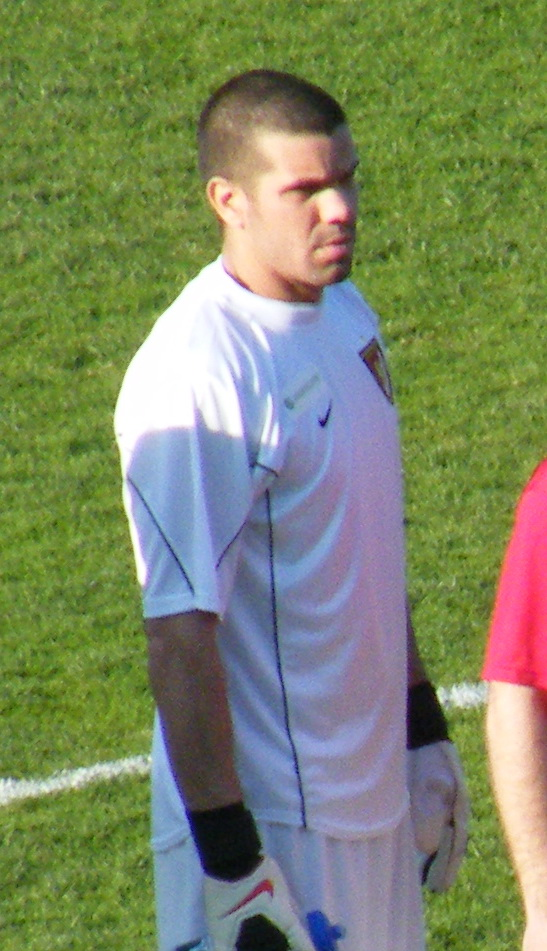

Personal information
- Date of birth: 18 May 1986 (age 40)
- Place of birth: Budapest, Hungary
- Height: 1.90 m (6 ft 3 in)
- Position: Goalkeeper

Team information
- Current team: III. Kerületi TVE (Manager)

Youth career
- 1993–2004: Ferencváros

Senior career*
Years	Team	Apps	(Gls)
2004–2005	Charlton	0	(0)
2005–2007	Ferencváros	48	(0)
2007–2008	Ethnikos Achnas	19	(0)
2008–2009	Ermis Aradippou	21	(0)
2009–2010	MTK	0	(0)
2010–2016	Honvéd	152	(0)
2016–2017	Paks	16	(0)
2017–2019	Budaörsi	13	(0)

International career
2002–2003	Hungary U-17	5	(0)
2003–2005	Hungary U-19	12	(0)
2005–2006	Hungary U-20	5	(0)
2006–2007	Hungary U-21	0	(0)

Managerial career
- 2019–: III. Kerületi TVE
- * Club domestic league appearances and goals

Szabolcs Kemenes (born 18 May 1986, in Budapest) is a retired Hungarian football player and currently the manager of III. Kerületi TVE.

== Career ==
In 2003, he was the first choice goalkeeper of the Hungarian National U17 squad at the European U17 championship in Portugal. In season 2006/07, he was the second choice goalkeeper for the Hungary U21 side after Zoltán Kovács. In season 2008/09, Kemenes was the key figure as Ermis Aradippou won the Cypriot Second Division and obtained the right to compete again in the First Division.

== Coaching career ==
Kemenes retired at the end of the 2018–19 season and was appointed as manager of III. Kerületi TVE in June 2019.

== Career statistics ==
Appearances and goals by club, season and competition
Club	Season	League			Cup		League Cup		Europe		Total	
Club	Season	Division	Apps	Goals	Apps	Goals	Apps	Goals	Apps	Goals	Apps	Goals
Ferencváros
Ferencváros	2005–06	Nemzeti Bajnokság I	15	0	0	0	0	0	0	0	15	0
Ferencváros	2006–07	Nemzeti Bajnokság II	29	0	5	0	0	0	0	0	34	0
Ferencváros	Total		44	0	5	0	0	0	0	0	49	0
Ethnikos	2007–08	Cypriot First Division	19	0	0	0	0	0	0	0	19	0
Ermis	2008–09	Cypriot First Division	21	0	0	0	0	0	0	0	21	0
Honvéd
Honvéd	2009–10	Nemzeti Bajnokság I	1	0	0	0	6	0	0	0	7	0
Honvéd	2010–11	Nemzeti Bajnokság I	27	0	2	0	1	0	0	0	30	0
Honvéd	2011–12	Nemzeti Bajnokság I	22	0	0	0	0	0	0	0	22	0
Honvéd	2012–13	Nemzeti Bajnokság I	26	0	4	0	3	0	4	0	37	0
Honvéd	2013–14	Nemzeti Bajnokság I	29	0	2	0	1	0	4	0	36	0
Honvéd	2014–15	Nemzeti Bajnokság I	28	0	4	0	2	0	0	0	34	0
Honvéd	Total		133	0	12	0	13	0	8	0	166	0
Career total			217	0	17	0	19	0	8	0	255	0

Updated to games played as of 6 December 2014.
