= Botond Baráth =

Hungarian footballer

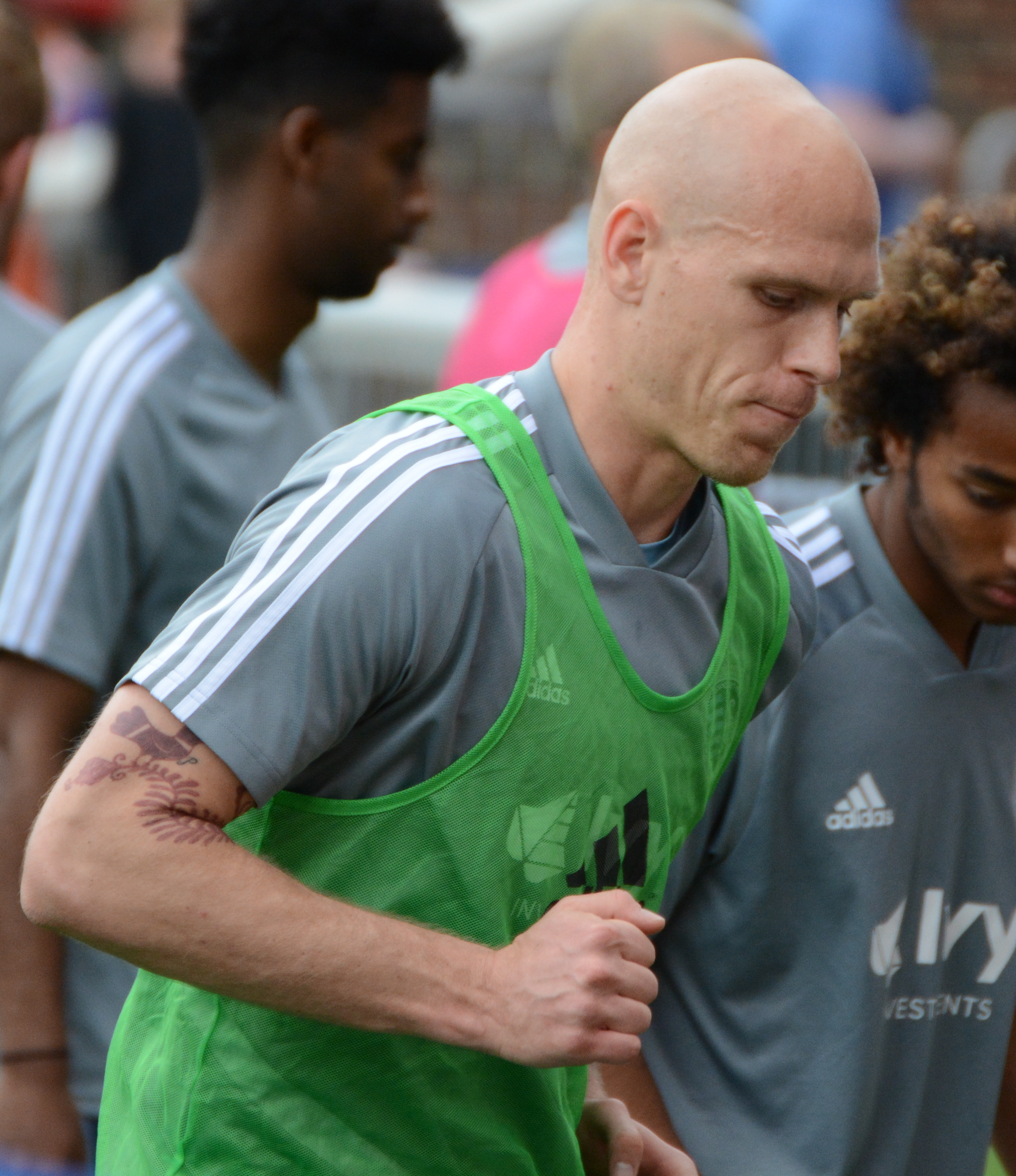
- Baráth with Sporting Kansas City in 2019

Personal information
- Date of birth: 21 April 1992 (age 34)
- Place of birth: Budapest, Hungary
- Height: 1.88 m (6 ft 2 in)
- Position: Defender

Team information
- Current team: Vasas
- Number: 36

Youth career
- 2001–2002: Dunakeszi
- 2002–2008: Újpest
- 2008–2012: Honvéd

Senior career*
Years	Team	Apps	(Gls)
2012–2019	Honvéd	159	(6)
2019–2020	Sporting Kansas City	21	(1)
2019	→ Swope Park Rangers (loan)	1	(0)
2020–2022	Honvéd	29	(0)
2022–	Vasas	80	(3)

International career^{‡}
2009–2010	Hungary U-18		
2010–2012	Hungary U-19	1	(0)
2012–2013	Hungary U-21	11	(1)
2018–	Hungary	11	(0)
- * Club domestic league appearances and goals as of 31 May 2026 ‡ National team caps and goals as of 15 May 2021

Botond Baráth (Hungarian: [ˈbotond ˈbɒraːt]; born 21 April 1992) is a Hungarian football player who plays for Vasas as a defender.

== Club career ==
From Budapest, Baráth is a 6 feet 2 inches (1.88 m) right-footed central defender, who joined his hometown club Budapest Honved FC as a youth. After making 213 first-team appearances in all competitions since 2009 during which he helped Honved to the 2016–17 Hungarian first-division title, Barath was announced as moving to MLS fulfilling an international slot for Sporting Kansas City.

On 11 July 2020, Sporting Kansas City agreed to transfer Baráth back to Honvéd.

On 21 June 2022, Baráth signed a three-year contract with Vasas.

== International career ==
Baráth earned his first three caps for the Hungary national team in 2018. He made his international debut in a 3–3 draw at Estonia on 15 October 2018 in the UEFA Nations League before earning consecutive starts in 2–0 wins over Estonia and Finland in November 2018.

== Career statistics ==
=== Club ===
As of match played 15 May 2022

Appearances and goals by club, season and competition
Club	Season	League			Cup		League Cup		Europe		Total	
Club	Season	Division	Apps	Goals	Apps	Goals	Apps	Goals	Apps	Goals	Apps	Goals
Honvéd	2009–10	Nemzeti Bajnokság I	0	0	0	0	1	0	0	0	1	0
Honvéd	2010–11	Nemzeti Bajnokság I	0	0	3	0	3	0	0	0	6	0
Honvéd	2011–12	Nemzeti Bajnokság II	0	0	2	0	3	0	0	0	5	0
Honvéd	2012–13	Nemzeti Bajnokság I	21	1	5	1	5	0	1	0	32	2
Honvéd	2013–14	Nemzeti Bajnokság I	24	0	3	0	1	0	3	0	31	0
Honvéd	2014–15	Nemzeti Bajnokság I	19	1	3	1	7	0	—		29	2
Honvéd	2015–16	Nemzeti Bajnokság I	30	3	2	1	—		—		32	4
Honvéd	2016–17	Nemzeti Bajnokság I	22	0	2	0	—		—		24	0
Honvéd	2017–18	Nemzeti Bajnokság I	27	1	6	1	—		2	1	35	3
Honvéd	2018–19	Nemzeti Bajnokság I	16	0	0	0	—		2	1	19	1
Honvéd	Total		159	6	26	4	20	0	8	2	213	12
Honvéd	2020–21	Nemzeti Bajnokság I	14	0	0	0	—		2	0	16	0
Honvéd	2021–22	Nemzeti Bajnokság I	13	0	3	1	—		—		16	1
Honvéd	Total		27	0	3	1	0	0	2	0	32	1
Career total			186	6	29	5	20	0	10	2	245	13

=== International ===
Appearances and goals by national team and year
National team	Year	Apps	Goals
Hungary	2018	3	0
Hungary	2019	8	0
Total		11	0

== Honours ==
Honvéd

- Nemzeti Bajnokság I: 2016–17
