= Florian Trinks =

German footballer (born 1992)

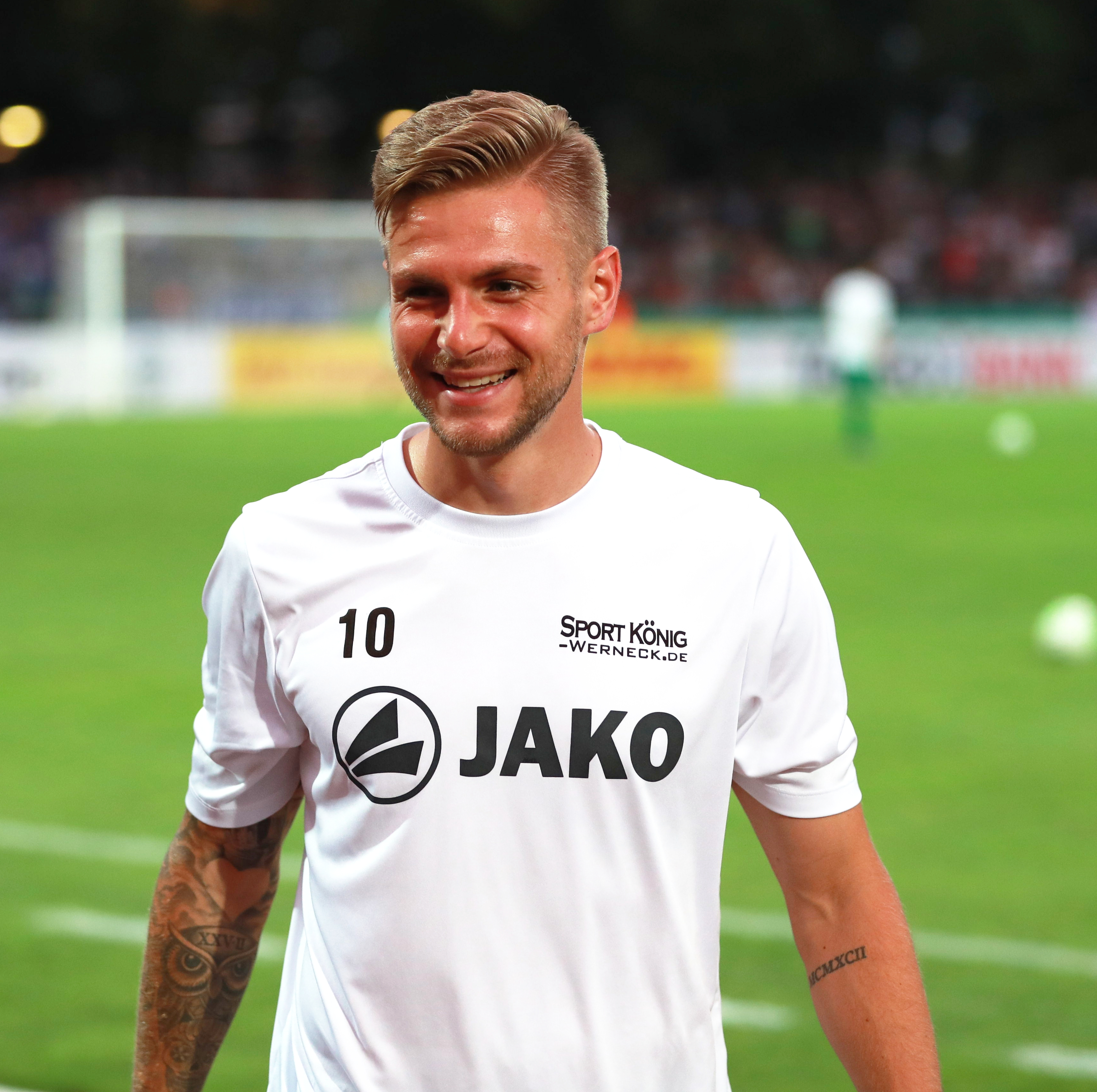
- Trinks with 1. FC Schweinfurt 05 in 2018

Personal information
- Date of birth: 11 March 1992 (age 34)
- Place of birth: Gera, Germany
- Height: 1.85 m (6 ft 1 in)
- Position: Attacking midfielder

Youth career
- 2001–2004: FC Gera
- 2004–2006: Carl Zeiss Jena
- 2007–2011: Werder Bremen

Senior career*
Years	Team	Apps	(Gls)
2010–2012	Werder Bremen II	37	(4)
2011–2013	Werder Bremen	14	(0)
2013–2015	Greuther Fürth	51	(6)
2013–2015	Greuther Fürth II	9	(0)
2016–2017	Ferencváros	22	(4)
2017–2018	Chemnitzer FC	8	(0)
2018–2019	1. FC Schweinfurt 05	21	(6)
Total		162	(20)

International career
2008	Germany U16	2	(1)
2008–2009	Germany U17	20	(6)
2009	Germany U18	2	(3)
2011	Germany U19	2	(0)
2011	Germany U20	5	(0)
Medal record
Men's football
Representing Germany
UEFA European Under-17 Championship
Winner	2009 Germany
- * Club domestic league appearances and goals

Florian Trinks (born 11 March 1992) is a German former professional footballer who played as an attacking midfielder.

== Club career ==
=== Greuther Fürth ===
Trinks scored his first Bundesliga goal on the last matchday of the season in Greuther Fürth's 3–1 defeat against FC Augsburg.

After the referee awarded a goal in a match against SV Sandhausen on 8 December 2013, Trinks admitted he had handled the ball before it crossed the line, and the "goal" was disallowed. He was later presented with a fair-play medal in recognition of his sportsmanship.

=== Ferencváros ===
After only two appearances in the first half of the 2015–16 season for Greuther Fürth, Trinks signed as a free agent with Hungarian team Ferencvárosi TC on 21 January 2016.

=== Chemnitzer FC ===
In June 2017, Trinks joined 3. Liga club Chemnitzer FC on a two-year deal. A year later, he was released by the club.

=== 1. FC Schweinfurt 05 ===
In August 2018, Trinks signed with 1. FC Schweinfurt 05 in tier-four Regionalliga Bayern.

=== Retirement ===
Trinks retired in 2019 aged 27, after sustaining a heavy injury to his ankle.

== International career ==
Alongside with Mario Götze and Marc-André ter Stegen, Trinks represented Germany at the 2009 UEFA European Under-17 Football Championship, in which the team won the title after his decisive free-kick goal in the overtime period of the final.

== Personal life ==
Following his retirement from playing, Trinks studied to become a primary school teacher. As of June 2021, he lives near Nürnberg and has two children.

== Honours ==
Ferencváros

- Hungarian National Championship: 2015–16
- Hungarian Cup: 2015–16, 2016–17

Germany U17

- UEFA European Under-17 Championship: 2009

Individual

- Fair-Play Medal Deutsche Olympische Gesellschaft: 2014
- Goal of the Month (Germany): May 2009
