= Raul Palmeș =

Romanian professional footballer

Personal information
- Full name: Raul Ioan Palmeș
- Date of birth: 16 August 1996 (age 30)
- Place of birth: Sibiu, Romania
- Height: 1.82 m (6 ft 0 in)
- Position: Defender

Team information
- Current team: FK Csíkszereda
- Number: 3

Youth career
- 2006–2013: Interstar Sibiu
- 2013–2015: Budapest Honvéd

Senior career*
Years	Team	Apps	(Gls)
2015–2021	Budapest Honvéd	2	(0)
2015	→ Törökbálint TC (loan)		
2017–2019	→ Kazincbarcika (loan)	62	(3)
2019–2021	→ FK Csíkszereda (loan)	44	(0)
2021–2022	Concordia Chiajna	41	(0)
2023–2024	1599 Șelimbăr	37	(1)
2024–	FK Csíkszereda	75	(1)
- * Club domestic league appearances and goals as of 7 November 2026

Raul Ioan Palmeș (born 16 August 1996) is a Romanian professional footballer who plays as a defender for Liga I club FK Csíkszereda.

== Honours ==
Budapest Honvéd

- Nemzeti Bajnokság I: 2016–17
