= List of Hungarian football transfers summer 2015 =

This is a list of Hungarian football transfers in the summer transfer window 2015 by club. Only transfers in Nemzeti Bajnokság I, and Nemzeti Bajnokság II are included.

== Nemzeti Bajnokság I ==
=== Békéscsaba ===
In:

No.	Pos.	Nation	Player
2	DF	BRA	Fábio Guarú (from Puskás Akadémia)
4	DF	HUN	Balázs Bényei (from Debrecen II)
7	MF	HUN	Dániel Szalai (from Kecskemét)
9	FW	HUN	Tamás Kertész (from Debrecen II)
12	GK	SVK	Luboš Ilizi (from (Czech Republic) Znojmo)
13	FW	SRB	Bratislav Punoševac (from Budapest Honvéd)
17	FW	HUN	László Oláh (from Vasas II)
18	DF	HUN	Viktor Vadász (from= Újpest)
23	DF	MNE	Slavko Damjanović (from (Serbia) Bačka)
24	MF	ESP	Ezequiel Calvente (from (Portugal) Penafiel)
25	MF	AUT	Thomas Piermayr (from (Belarus) Minsk)
28	DF	HUN	Tamás Vaskó (from Dunaújváros)
30	MF	UKR	Alex Svedyuk
86	DF	HUN	Zsolt Laczkó (from Kecskemét)
88	MF	BUL	Georgi Korudzhiev (from (Bulgaria) Haskovo)

Out:

No.	Pos.	Nation	Player
4	MF	HUN	Viktor Tölgyesi (to Felsőtárkány)
5	DF	HUN	Balázs Koszó (loan to Dunaújváros)
7	MF	HUN	Richárd Balázs (to Szigetszentmiklós)
9	FW	GER	Thomas Prasler (to Vác)
16	FW	HUN	Roland Vólent (loan to Szigetszentmiklós)
17	FW	HUN	Tamás Kertész (loan return to Debrecen II)
18	MF	HUN	Patrik Király (to Szeged)
19	DF	HUN	Miklós Balogh (to Szeged)
23	DF	HUN	Balázs Bényei (loan return to Debrecen II)
24	FW	HUN	Péter Berki (unattached)
25	MF	HUN	Milán Balogh (loan to Gyula)
90	GK	HUN	Dániel Póser (to Vasas)

=== Budapest Honvéd ===
In:

No.	Pos.	Nation	Player
2	DF	HUN	Dávid Bobál (loan return from Sopron)
7	MF	HUN	Richárd Vernes (loan return from (Australia) Central Coast Mariners)
9	FW	HUN	Gergely Bobál (loan return from Gyirmót)
13	DF	ITA	Raffaele Alcibiade (loan return from Szombathely)
14	DF	ROU	Loránd Szilágyi (from (Romania) Gaz Metan)
22	MF	HUN	Dániel Göblyös (from Budapest Honvéd youth)
22	MF	HUN	Valér Kapacina (loan return from Sopron)
23	DF	HUN	Gábor Erdős (from Budapest Honvéd II)
24	MF	BIH	Đorđe Kamber (from Győr)
25	DF	CRO	Ivan Lovrić (from Kecskemét)
44	GK	HUN	Dániel Vajda (from Budapest Honvéd youth)
63	FW	HUN	László Erdélyi (from Budapest Honvéd II)
66	MF	SRB	Dušan Vasiljević (from (Austria) Ritzing)
87	FW	HUN	Gergely Délczeg (loan return from Zalaegerszeg)

Out:

No.	Pos.	Nation	Player
3	DF	ALB	Kristi Marku (Released)
7	MF	ARG	Lucas Ontivero (loan return to (Turkey) Galatasaray)
9	FW	MEX	David Izazola (loan return to (Mexico) San Luis)
9	FW	HUN	Gergely Bobál (to (Germany) Wolfsburg II)
11	FW	SOM	Ayub Daud (Released)
13	FW	SRB	Bratislav Punoševac (to Békéscsaba)
13	DF	ITA	Raffaele Alcibiade (to Szombathely)
15	DF	SRB	Josip Projić (to (Serbia) Napredak)
19	DF	CRO	Josip Elez (loan return to (Italy) Lazio)
20	MF	PAN	Aníbal Godoy (to (United States) San Jose)
22	MF	HUN	Valér Kapacina (loan to Soroksár)
30	MF	HUN	Bálint Vécsei (to (Italy) Bologna)
44	MF	VEN	Jesús Meza (to (Venezuela) Aragua)
66	DF	SRB	Jevrem Kosnić (loan return to (Italy) Palermo)
88	DF	MNE	Marko Vidović (to (Albania) Partizani)

=== Debrecen ===
In:

No.	Pos.	Nation	Player
22	GK	CRO	Božidar Radošević (from Balmazújvárosi)
30	GK	HUN	János Balogh (from Nyíregyháza)
91	FW	NED	Geoffrey Castillion (free agent)

Out:

No.	Pos.	Nation	Player
23	FW	HUN	Ádám Kovács (on loan to Soproni)
—	MF	FRA	Selim Bouadla (to (Portugal) Académica)

=== Diósgyőri ===
In:

No.	Pos.	Nation	Player
18	MF	HUN	Miklós Kitl (from Kecskeméti)
25	MF	CAN	Manjrekar James (from Pécs)
86	FW	HUN	Soma Novothny (on loan from (Italy) Napoli)

Out:

No.	Pos.	Nation	Player
18	MF	HUN	András Gosztonyi (to Haladás)
-	MF	NED	Julian Jenner (to (England) Notts County)
-	MF	SRB	Miloš Krstić (to (Serbia) Radnički Niš)

=== Ferencvárosi ===
In:

No.	Pos.	Nation	Player
8	FW	HUN	Zsolt Haraszti (from Paks)
10	FW	HUN	András Radó (from Haladás)
11	FW	SVK	Stanislav Šesták (from (Germany) VfL Bochum)
16	MF	HUN	Leandro (from (Cyprus) Omonia)
17	MF	HUN	Ádám Pintér (from (Greece) Levadiakos)
77	DF	ECU	Cristian Ramírez (from (Germany) Fortuna Düsseldorf)

Out:

No.	Pos.	Nation	Player
23	MF	HUN	Dániel Nagy (to (Germany) Würzburger Kickers)
35	DF	HUN	Predrag Bošnjak (to Haladás)
44	DF	ESP	David Mateos (to (United States) Orlando City)
70	FW	HUN	Roland Ugrai (to Haladás)
88	MF	BRA	Somalia (to (France) Toulouse)
-	MF	BEL	Stanley Aborah (to (England) Notts County)

=== Haladás ===
In:

No.	Pos.	Nation	Player
1	GK	HUN	Gábor Király (free agent)
4	DF	HUN	Gábor Jánvári (from Nyíregyháza)
6	DF	BEL	Stef Wils (from (Belgium) Cercle Brugge)
8	FW	HUN	Ádám Dudás (from Győr)
10	FW	ITA	Leandro Antonio (from Győr)
13	DF	ITA	Raffaele Alcibiade (from Honvéd)
17	MF	HUN	Patrik Nagy (from (Germany) SV Seligenporten)
18	MF	HUN	András Gosztonyi (from Diósgyőri)
20	MF	BEL	Thomas Wils (from (Belgium) Lierse)
25	MF	CRO	Ante Batarelo (from Balmazújvárosi)
35	DF	HUN	Predrag Bošnjak (from Ferencvárosi)
70	FW	HUN	Roland Ugrai (from Ferencvárosi)
89	FW	SRB	Saša Popin (from Pápa)

Out:

No.	Pos.	Nation	Player
10	FW	ITA	Andrea Mancini (released)
12	MF	HUN	András Jancsó (on loan to Soproni)
18	MF	ITA	Tommaso Rocchi (released)
-	FW	HUN	András Radó (to Ferencvárosi)

=== Paks ===
In:

No.	Pos.	Nation	Player

Out:

No.	Pos.	Nation	Player
42	FW	HUN	Norbert Könyves (to Vasas)

=== Puskás Akadémia ===
In:

No.	Pos.	Nation	Player

Out:

No.	Pos.	Nation	Player
-	GK	SVK	Ľuboš Hajdúch (to (Slovakia) Skalica)

=== Újpest ===
In:

No.	Pos.	Nation	Player
4	DF	HUN	Dávid Kálnoki-Kis (from MTK)
7	MF	BEL	Kylian Hazard (from (Belgium) Zulte Waregem)
9	FW	SEN	Mbaye Diagne (on loan from (Italy) Juventus)
13	DF	HUN	Dávid Mohl (from Pécs)
16	DF	URU	Rodrigo Rojo (loan return from (Belgium) Sint-Truiden)
21	MF	HUN	Benjamin Balázs (from (Czech Republic) Teplice)
24	FW	HUN	Patrik Tóth (from Újpest U20)
30	FW	HUN	Dániel Sallói (from (United States) Sporting Kansas City)
32	GK	HUN	Zoltán Kovács (from (Romania) Dinamo București)
88	MF	HUN	Attila Filkor (from (Italy) Milan)

Out:

No.	Pos.	Nation	Player
2	DF	FRA	Loïc Nego (loan return to (England) Charlton Athletic)
4	MF	SRB	Filip Stanisavljević (to (Greece) Platanias)
9	FW	NGA	Kim Ojo (loan return to (Belgium) Genk)
16	DF	URU	Rodrigo Rojo (to (Uruguay) Centro Atlético Fénix)
25	DF	HUN	Viktor Vadász (released)
26	DF	SVK	Dávid Hudák (loan return to (Slovakia) Slovan Bratislava)
99	MF	BIH	Asmir Suljić (to Videoton)
-	DF	COL	Darwin Andrade (to (Belgium) Standard Liège)
-	MF	ALB	Berat Ahmeti (to (Albania) Vllaznia Shkodër)
-	MF	MLI	Falaye Sacko (on loan to (Belgium) Sint-Truiden)

=== Vasas ===
In:

No.	Pos.	Nation	Player
1	GK	HUN	Gergely Nagy (from Dunaújváros)
12	MF	SRB	Miloš Adamović (from (Serbia) Mladost Lučani)
17	DF	HUN	Attila Osváth (from Szigetszentmiklósi)
20	FW	HUN	Krisztián Kenesei (from Pápa)
22	FW	SRB	Vojo Ubiparip (from (Poland) Lech Poznań)
33	DF	SRB	Tomislav Pajović (from (Israel) Hapeol Be'er Sheva)
42	FW	HUN	Norbert Könyves (from Paks)
99	FW	HUN	Csanád Novák (from Kecskeméti)
-	FW	UKR	Yevhen Pavlov (from (Serbia) Mladost Lučani)

Out:

No.	Pos.	Nation	Player

=== Videoton ===
In:

No.	Pos.	Nation	Player
2	DF	FRA	Loïc Nego (from (England) Charlton Athletic)
8	MF	HUN	Zsolt Pölöskei (from MTK)
14	FW	HUN	Gergely Rudolf (from Győri)
17	MF	HUN	Máté Pátkai (from Győri)
18	DF	HUN	Ádám Lang (from Győri)
44	GK	SRB	Branislav Danilović (on loan from Puskás)
74	GK	HUN	Ádám Kovácsik (from (Italy) Reggina)
99	MF	BIH	Asmir Suljić (from Újpest)

Out:

No.	Pos.	Nation	Player
12	MF	SLV	Arturo Álvarez (to (United States) Houston Dynamo)
-	GK	SVK	Tomáš Tujvel (on loan to (Slovakia) Dunajská Streda)

== Nemzeti Bajnokság II ==
=== Balmazújvárosi ===
In:

No.	Pos.	Nation	Player

Out:

No.	Pos.	Nation	Player
-	MF	CRO	Ante Batarelo (to Haladás)

=== Gyrimót ===
In:

No.	Pos.	Nation	Player
1	GK	HUN	Zsolt Sebők (from (Cyprus) Pafos)

Out:

No.	Pos.	Nation	Player

=== Kecskeméti ===
In:

No.	Pos.	Nation	Player

Out:

No.	Pos.	Nation	Player
1	GK	SVK	Tomáš Tujvel (loan return to Videoton)
5	FW	MNE	Darko Pavićević (to (Albania) Vllazina Shkodër)
9	FW	HUN	Csanád Novák (to Vasas)
17	MF	HUN	Miklós Kitl (to Diósgyőri)
30	MF	TOG	Henri Eninful (to (Cyprus) Doxa)
31	DF	SRB	Dejan Karan (to (Albania) Tirana)
-	DF	SRB	Nebojša Skopljak (to (Cyprus) Ayia Napa)

=== Mezőkövesd-Zsóry ===
In:

No.	Pos.	Nation	Player
13	GK	SVK	Ladislav Rybánsky (from (Slovakia) Sered')

Out:

No.	Pos.	Nation	Player

=== Nyíregyháza Spartacus ===
In:

No.	Pos.	Nation	Player
6	MF	HON	Luis Ramos (from (Azerbaijan) AZAL)

Out:

No.	Pos.	Nation	Player
26	DF	LVA	Deniss Ivanovs (to (Latvia) Liepāja)
-	GK	HUN	János Balogh (to Debrecen)
-	DF	HUN	Gábor Jánvári (to Haladás)
-	FW	FRA	L'Imam Seydi (to (Azerbaijan) Khazar Lankaran)

=== Soproni ===
In:

No.	Pos.	Nation	Player
18	MF	HUN	András Jancsó (on loan from Haladás)
-	FW	HUN	Ádám Kovács (on loan from Debrecen)

Out:

No.	Pos.	Nation	Player

== See also ==
- 2015–16 Nemzeti Bajnokság I
- 2015–16 Nemzeti Bajnokság II
- 2015–16 Nemzeti Bajnokság III
- 2015–16 Magyar Kupa
