= 2015–16 Békéscsaba 1912 Előre season =

Békéscsaba
2015–16 season
- Manager: Zoran Spišljak
- Stadium: Stadion Kórház utcai
- Nemzeti Bajnokság I: 12th (relegated)
- Magyar Kupa: Semi-finals
- Top goalscorer: League: Zsolt Laczkó (5); All: Botond Birtalan (7)
- Highest home attendance: 3,750 (vs Vasas, 19 April 2016)
- Lowest home attendance: 361 (vs MTK Budapest, 27 October 2015)
Home colours	Away colours

The 2015–16 season was Békéscsaba 1912 Előre's 98th competitive season, 103rd year in existence as a football club and 1st consecutive season in the Nemzeti Bajnokság I since their relegation from it in 2005. Stayed in the relegation zone since the second round, the club's relegation became certain in the penultimate round of the league season.

In addition to the domestic league, Békéscsaba participated in this season's editions of the Magyar Kupa. Despite the crashing performance in the league, the team reached the semi-finals and they were knocked out by Újpest.

== Kits ==
Home	Home alt.	Away	Goalkeeper 1	Goalkeeper 2

== First team squad ==
The players listed had league appearances and stayed until the end of the season.

Note: Flags indicate national team as defined under FIFA eligibility rules; some limited exceptions apply. Players may hold more than one non-FIFA nationality.

No.	Pos.	Nation	Player
1	GK	HUN	Roland Mursits
2	DF	BRA	Fábio Guarú
4	DF	HUN	Balázs Bényei
5	DF	HUN	Balázs Koszó
6	FW	HUN	Botond Birtalan
7	FW	HUN	Dániel Szalai
8	FW	ENG	Nathan Eccleston
9	MF	HUN	Péter Takács
10	MF	HUN	István Spitzmüller
11	DF	HUN	Zsolt Balog (captain)
13	FW	SRB	Bratislav Punoševac
14	MF	HUN	Bálint Borbély
15	DF	HUN	Zsolt Fehér
17	FW	HUN	László Oláh

No.	Pos.	Nation	Player
18	DF	HUN	Viktor Vadász
20	FW	SVK	Matúš Paukner
21	DF	HUN	György Juhász
22	DF	HUN	Ádám Viczián
23	DF	MNE	Slavko Damjanović
24	FW	ESP	Ezequiel Calvente
25	MF	AUT	Thomas Piermayr
27	MF	HUN	Márkó Pilán
28	DF	HUN	Tamás Vaskó
30	DF	UKR	Oleksiy Shvedyuk
42	DF	HUN	Norbert Szélpál
44	GK	MNE	Vukašin Poleksić
67	MF	HUN	Martin Hudák
86	FW	HUN	Zsolt Laczkó

== Transfers ==
=== Transfers in ===
Transfer window	Pos.	No.	Player	From
Summer	DF	2	(Brazil) Fábio Guarú	Puskás Akadémia
Summer	DF	4	(Hungary) Balázs Bényei	Debrecen
Summer	FW	7	(Hungary) Dániel Szalai	Free agent (Note: Previous club: Kecskemét.)
Summer	GK	12	(Slovakia) Luboš Ilizi	(Czech Republic) Znojmo
Summer	FW	13	(Serbia) Bratislav Punoševac	Free agent (Note: Previous club: Budapest Honvéd.)
Summer	FW	17	(Hungary) László Oláh	Free agent (Note: Previous club: Vasas.)
Summer	DF	18	(Hungary) Viktor Vadász	Free agent (Note: Previous club: Újpest.)
Summer	DF	23	(Montenegro) Slavko Damjanović	(Serbia) Bačka 1901
Summer	FW	24	(Spain) Ezequiel Calvente	Free agent (Note: Previous club: Penafiel.)
Summer	MF	25	(Austria) Thomas Piermayr	Free agent (Note: Previous club: FK Minsk.)
Summer	DF	28	(Hungary) Tamás Vaskó	Dunaújváros
Summer	DF	30	(Ukraine) Oleksiy Shvedyuk	Free agent
Summer	FW	86	(Hungary) Zsolt Laczkó	Free agent (Note: Previous club: Kecskemét.)
Summer	MF	88	(Bulgaria) Georgi Korudzhiev	Free agent (Note: Previous club: Haskovo.)
Winter	FW	8	(England) Nathan Eccleston	Free agent (Note: Previous club: Kilmarnock.)
Winter	MF	9	(Hungary) Péter Takács	Free agent (Note: Previous club: Mezőkövesd.)
Winter	FW	20	(Slovakia) Matúš Paukner	(Slovakia) Nitra
Winter	GK	44	(Montenegro) Vukašin Poleksić	(Montenegro) Sutjeska Nikšić

=== Transfers out ===
Transfer window	Pos.	No.	Player	To
Summer	MF	4	(Hungary) Viktor Tölgyesi	Released (Note: Joined Felsőtárkány.)
Summer	MF	7	(Hungary) Richárd Balázs	Szigetszentmiklós
Summer	FW	9	(Hungary) Thomas Prasler	Vác
Summer	MF	18	(Hungary) Patrik Király	Szeged
Summer	DF	19	(Hungary) Miklós Balogh	Szeged
Summer	FW	24	(Hungary) Péter Berki	Released
Summer	GK	90	(Hungary) Dániel Póser	Released (Note: Joined Vasas.)
Winter	DF	3	(Hungary) Mihály Szántó	Released
Winter	GK	12	(Slovakia) Luboš Ilizi	Released
Winter	FW	20	(Hungary) Péter Szilágyi	Soroksár
Winter	MF	88	(Bulgaria) Georgi Korudzhiev	Released

=== Loans in ===
Transfer window	Pos.	No.	Player	From	End date
Summer	FW	9	(Hungary) Tamás Kertész	Debrecen	January 2016 (Note: Renewed loan from previous season.)
Winter	MF	67	(Hungary) Martin Hudák	Puskás Akadémia	End of season

=== Loans out ===
Transfer window	Pos.	No.	Player	To	End date
Summer	DF	5	(Hungary) Balázs Koszó	Dunaújváros	January 2016
Summer	MF	25	(Hungary) Milán Balogh	Gyula	End of season
Winter	DF	8	(Hungary) István Bagi	Kisvárda	End of season

== Competitions ==
=== Overview ===
Competition	First match	Last match	Starting round	Final position	Record							
Competition	First match	Last match	Starting round	Final position	Pld	W	D	L	GF	GA	GD	Win %
Nemzeti Bajnokság I	19 July 2015	30 April 2016	Matchday 1	12th	33	6	9	18	25	55	−30	18.18
Magyar Kupa	12 August 2015	12 April 2016	Round of 128	Semi-finals	9	5	3	1	10	6	+4	55.56
Total					42	11	12	19	35	61	−26	26.19

Source: Competitions

=== Nemzeti Bajnokság I ===
==== League table ====
Pos	Team	Pld	W	D	L	GF	GA	GD	Pts	Qualification or relegation
8	Honvéd	33	12	7	14	40	39	+1	43	
9	Diósgyőr	33	10	8	15	37	47	−10	38	
10	Vasas	33	9	5	19	32	54	−22	32	
11	Puskás Akadémia (R)	33	7	10	16	35	51	−16	31	Relegation to the Nemzeti Bajnokság II
12	Békéscsaba (R)	33	6	9	18	25	55	−30	27	Relegation to the Nemzeti Bajnokság II

Source: Soccerway
Rules for classification: 1) Points; 2) Matches won; 3) Goal difference; 4) Goals scored; 5) Head-to-head points; 6) Head-to-head goal difference; 7) Head-to-head away goals scored; 8) Fairplay; 9) Draw.
(R) Relegated

==== Results summary ====
Overall								Home						Away					
Pld	W	D	L	GF	GA	GD	Pts	W	D	L	GF	GA	GD	W	D	L	GF	GA	GD
33	6	9	18	25	55	−30	27	3	5	8	14	22	−8	3	4	10	11	33	−22

Source: Hungarian Football Federation

==== Results by round ====
Round	1	2	3	4	5	6	7	8	9	10	11	12	13	14	15	16	17	18	19	20	21	22	23	24	25	26	27	28	29	30	31	32	33
Ground	H	A	A	H	A	H	H	H	A	H	H	A	H	H	A	H	A	A	A	H	A	A	A	H	A	H	A	H	A	A	H	A	H
Result	L	L	L	L	W	L	L	D	L	W	D	L	L	L	L	W	L	D	L	L	D	D	W	L	D	W	L	D	L	W	D	L	D
Position	8	12	12	12	11	12	12	12	12	12	12	12	12	12	12	12	12	12	12	12	12	12	12	12	12	12	12	12	12	11	12	12	12

Source: Matches
A = Away; H = Home; W = Win; D = Draw; L = Loss

==== Matches ====
19 July 2015 1	Békéscsaba	2–3	Debrecen	Békéscsaba
18:00 CEST (UTC+2)	Laczkó 14'; Viczián 36', (yellow card) 59'; Borbély (yellow card) 70'; Punoševac (yellow card) 85'; Balog (yellow card) 90+1'	Report	Nagy 20'; Tisza 68'; Bényei 90+1' (o.g.)	Stadium: Stadion Kórház utcai Attendance: 3,700; Referee: Csaba Pintér

25 July 2015 2	Paks	4–0	Békéscsaba	Paks
18:00 CEST (UTC+2)	Gévay 9', 73'; Balázs 80'; Szakály 90+1' (pen.)	Report	Korudzhiev (yellow card) 86'; Szalai (yellow card) 90'	Stadium: Fehérvári úti Stadion; Attendance: 1,000; Referee: József Erdős

1 August 2015 3	Újpest	2–0	Békéscsaba	Budapest
aa:00 CEST (UTC+2)	Kálnoki-Kis 23'; Perović 43'; G. Nagy (yellow card) 55'	Report	Bényei (yellow card) 39'; Fehér (yellow card) 52'; Korudzhiev (yellow card) 58'; Laczkó (yellow card) 90+1'	Stadium: Ferenc Szusza Stadium; Attendance: 3,692; Referee: Ádám Németh

8 August 2015 4	Békéscsaba	0–2	Vasas	Békéscsaba
18:00 CEST (UTC+2)	Spitzmüller (yellow card) 45'; Piermayr (yellow card) 67'; Calvente (yellow card) 71'; Borbély (red card) 87'	Report	Debreceni (yellow card) 12'; Lázok (yellow card) 18'; Remili 52'; Novák 57'; Berecz (yellow card) 68'	Stadium: Stadion Kórház utcai Attendance: 2,914; Referee: Zsolt Szabó

15 August 2015 5	Puskás Akadémia	1–2	Békéscsaba	Felcsút
18:00 CEST (UTC+2)	Márkvárt 12'; Tischler (yellow card) 89'; Fodor (yellow card) 90+2'	Report	Calvente (yellow card) 11'; Laczkó (yellow card) 39'; Szilágyi 53'; Pekár 57' (o.g.)	Stadium: Pancho Aréna; Attendance: 941; Referee: Ádám Németh

22 August 2015 6	Békéscsaba	1–4	Budapest Honvéd	Békéscsaba
18:00 CEST (UTC+2)	Calvente 54'	Report	Kamber 30', 90+1'; Youla 58'; Délczeg (yellow card) 77'; Koszó 84' (o.g.); Ignjatović (yellow card) 85'; G. Nagy (yellow card) 88'	Stadium: Stadion Kórház utcai Attendance: 1,658; Referee: Péter Solymosi

29 August 2015 7	Békéscsaba	0–1	Haladás	Békéscsaba
18:00 CEST (UTC+2)	Punoševac (yellow card) 36'; Korudzhiev (yellow card) 42'; Szalai (yellow card) 84'	Report	Németh 26'; Iszlai (yellow card) 83'; Bošnjak (yellow card) 87'	Stadium: Stadion Kórház utcai Attendance: 1,422; Referee: Balázs Berke

12 September 2015 8	Békéscsaba	1–1	Diósgyőr	Békéscsaba
18:00 CEST (UTC+2)	Birtalan 18', (yellow card) 43'; Vaskó (yellow card) 47'; Ilizi (yellow card) 78'; Borbély (yellow card) 87'	Report	Lipták (yellow card) 2'; Egerszegi (yellow card) 42'; Okuka 87', (yellow card) 88'; Grumić (yellow card) 89'; Bacsa (red card) 90+3'	Stadium: Stadion Kórház utcai Attendance: 1,261; Referee: József Erdős

19 September 2015 9	Ferencváros	1–0	Békéscsaba	Budapest
18:00 CEST (UTC+2)	Böde 21'; Leandro (yellow card) 90+2'	Report	Viczián (yellow card) 54'	Stadium: Groupama Arena; Attendance: 8,824; Referee: Gergely Szőts

26 September 2015 10	Békéscsaba	2–0	Videoton	Békéscsaba
18:00 CEST (UTC+2)	Viczián 23'; Bényei (yellow card) 38'; Borbély (yellow card) 40'; Calvente 45'	Report	Simon (yellow card) 32'; Vinícius (yellow card) 34'	Stadium: Stadion Kórház utcai Attendance: 1,312; Referee: Mihály Fábián

3 October 2015 11	Békéscsaba	1–1	MTK Budapest	Békéscsaba
18:00 CEST (UTC+2)	Laczkó (yellow card) 12'; Punoševac 90+3'	Report	Thiam (yellow card) 30'; Varga (yellow card) 36'; Torghelle 64'	Stadium: Stadion Kórház utcai Attendance: 1,732; Referee: Ferenc Karakó

17 October 2015 12	Debrecen	7–0	Békéscsaba	Debrecen
18:00 CEST (UTC+2)	Kulcsár 32', 68'; Sidibe 52'; N. Balogh 54'; Tisza 63'; Zsidai 76'; Jovanović 81'	Report	Borbély (yellow card) 42'; Guarú (yellow card) 58'; Calvente (yellow card) 65'; Vaskó (red card) 70'	Stadium: Nagyerdei Stadion; Attendance: 2,282; Referee: Szabolcs Szilasi

24 October 2015 13	Békéscsaba	2–3	Paks	Békéscsaba
17:30 CEST (UTC+2)	Birtalan 7', 9'; Szalai (red card) 90+2'	Report	Papp (yellow card) 46', (goal) 54'; Szakály 82'; Bartha 90+7'; Balázs (yellow card) 90+7'	Stadium: Stadion Kórház utcai Attendance: 1,246; Referee: Balázs Berke

31 October 2015 14	Békéscsaba	1–3	Újpest	Békéscsaba
18:00 CET (UTC+1)	Punoševac 4', (yellow card) 68'; Birtalan (yellow card) 21'; Bényei (yellow card) 39'	Report	Diagne (yellow card) 40', (goal) 79'; G. Nagy (yellow card) 68'; Perović 86'; Heris (yellow card) 89'; Balogh 90+1'	Stadium: Stadion Kórház utcai Attendance: 1,485; Referee: Tamás Bognár

21 November 2015 16	Békéscsaba	2–1	Puskás Akadémia	Békéscsaba
15:30 CET (UTC+1)	Laczkó 8', (yellow card) 87'; Damjanović (yellow card) 43', (goal) 53'	Report	Pauljević 6'; Herceg (yellow card) 36'; Bačelić-Grgić (yellow card) 42'	Stadium: Stadion Kórház utcai Attendance: 632; Referee: Ádám Németh

28 November 2015 17	Budapest Honvéd	3–2	Békéscsaba	Budapest
15:30 CET (UTC+1)	G. Nagy 6', 63'; Holender (yellow card) 40'; Prosser (yellow card) 72'; Baráth 90+1'	Report	Vaskó 3'; Birtalan 34', (yellow card) 75'; Viczián (yellow card) 36'; Punoševac (yellow card) 53'	Stadium: Bozsik József Stadion; Attendance: 600; Referee: Zsolt Szabó

2 December 2015 15	Vasas	4–0	Békéscsaba	Budapest
18:30 CET (UTC+1)	Pajović (yellow card) 20'; Könyves 41', 51'; Ádám (yellow card) 53'; Debreceni (yellow card) 58'; Pavlov 64'; Preklet (yellow card) 81'; Kenesei 84' (pen.)	Report	Bényei (yellow card) 66'; Laczkó (yellow card) 80'	Stadium: Stadion Rudolf Illovszky; Attendance: 1,100; Referee: Ádám Farkas
Note: The matches of the 15th round were originally scheduled for 7 November 2015, but was postponed due to HFF decision.

5 December 2015 18	Haladás	1–1	Békéscsaba	Szombathely
15:30 CET (UTC+1)	Iszlai 73'; Németh (yellow card) 78'	Report	Vaskó (yellow card) 19'; Piermayr (yellow card) 27'; Bagi (yellow card) 54'; Calvente 66'; Mursits (yellow card) 89'	Stadium: Rohonci Street Stadium; Attendance: 2,147; Referee: Ádám Németh

12 December 2015 19	Diósgyőr	2–0	Békéscsaba	Miskolc
15:30 CET (UTC+1)	Novothny 28'; Koman 61'	Report	Laczkó (yellow card) 42'; Piermayr (red card) 65'	Stadium: Diósgyőri Stadion; Attendance: 2,661; Referee: Jószef Erdős

13 February 2016 20	Békéscsaba	0–1	Ferencváros	Békéscsaba
15:30 CET (UTC+1)	Guarú (yellow card) 25'; Bényei (yellow card) 37'; Borbély (yellow card) 49'; Vaskó (yellow card) 75'	Report	Pintér 9'; Ramírez (yellow card) 37'; Nalepa (yellow card) 49'	Stadium: Stadion Kórház utcai Attendance: 2,532; Referee: Ferenc Karakó

20 February 2016 21	Videoton	1–1	Békéscsaba	Felcsút
15:30 CET (UTC+1)	Vaskó 18' (o.g.); Juhász (yellow card) 24'; Pátkai (yellow card) 83'; Sejben (yellow card) 90+1'	Report	Laczkó 10', (red card) 90+4'; Piermayr (yellow card) 14'; Poleksić (yellow card) 61'; Damjanović (yellow card) 64'; Calvente (yellow card) 80'	Stadium: Pancho Aréna; Attendance: 1,763; Referee: Szabolcs Szilasi

27 February 2016 22	MTK Budapest	0–0	Békéscsaba	Budapest
15:30 CET (UTC+1)	Torghelle (yellow card) 55'; Vass (yellow card) 74'; D. Gera (yellow card) 85'; Grgić (red card) 90'	Report	Calvente (yellow card) 35'; Takács (yellow card) 37'; Bényei (yellow card) 73'; Guarú (yellow card) 78'	Stadium: Stadion Rudolf Illovszky; Attendance: 500; Referee: Csaba Pintér

5 March 2016 23	Paks	0–2	Békéscsaba	Paks
18:00 CET (UTC+1)	Bartha (yellow card) 45'; Koltai (yellow card) 51'; Szakály (yellow card) 90+1'	Report	Eccleston 39'; Bényei (yellow card) 42'; Punoševac 62'; Laczkó (yellow card) 89'; Guarú (yellow card) 90+3'	Stadium: Fehérvári úti Stadion; Attendance: 1,046; Referee: Tamás Bognár

9 March 2016 24	Békéscsaba	0–1	Ferencváros	Békéscsaba
18:00 CET (UTC+1)	Piermayr (yellow card) 33'; Punoševac (yellow card) 44'	Report	Radó 44'; Z. Gera (yellow card) 90+4'	Stadium: Stadion Kórház utcai Attendance: 3,500; Referee: Csaba Pintér

12 March 2016 25	Videoton	1–1	Békéscsaba	Felcsút
15:30 CET (UTC+1)	Stopira (yellow card) 50', (goal) 57'; Juhász (yellow card) 67'	Report	Laczkó 9'; Piermayr (yellow card) 59'; Bényei (yellow card) 66'; Poleksić (yellow card) 79'; Damjanović (red card) 90+4'	Stadium: Pancho Aréna; Attendance: 1,164; Referee: Ádám Németh

19 March 2016 26	Békéscsaba	1–0	Újpest	Békéscsaba
15:30 CET (UTC+1)	Birtalan (yellow card) 24'; Paukner 89'	Report		Stadium: Stadion Kórház utcai Attendance: 1,431; Referee: József Erdős

2 April 2016 28	Békéscsaba	0–0	Diósgyőr	Békéscsaba
18:30 CEST (UTC+2)	Punoševac (yellow card) 90+1'; Piermayr (yellow card) 90+2'	Report		Stadium: Stadion Kórház utcai Attendance: 1,477; Referee: Tamás Bognár

6 April 2016 29	MTK Budapest	3–0	Békéscsaba	Dunaújváros
19:00 CEST (UTC+2)	Baki (yellow card) 15'; Vass (yellow card) 57'; Nikač 59'; D. Gera 66'; Hajdú 90+3'	Report	Laczkó (yellow card) 57'; Takács (yellow card) 77'; Piermayr (yellow card) 83'	Stadium: Dunaújváros Stadion; Attendance: 513; Referee: István Vad

9 April 2016 27	Haladás	1–0	Békéscsaba	Sopron
18:00 CEST (UTC+2)	Wils (yellow card) 48'; Williams 56'; Halmosi (yellow card) 64'	Report	Takács (yellow card) 8'; Calvente (yellow card) 30'; Punoševac (yellow card) 58'; Birtalan (yellow card) 59'	Stadium: Városi Stadion; Attendance: 1,187; Referee: Ferenc Karakó
Note: The matches of the 27th round were originally scheduled for 30 March 2016, but were postponed to ease the pressure on the tight schedule.

16 April 2016 30	Puskás Akadémia	0–1	Békéscsaba	Felcsút
18:00 CEST (UTC+2)	Lyopa (yellow card) 53'; Fiola (yellow card) 68'; Castillion (red card) 90+3'	Report	Vaskó 4'; Guarú (yellow card) 43'; Punoševac (yellow card) 66'; Calvente (yellow card) 82'	Stadium: Pancho Aréna; Attendance: 1,324; Referee: Péter Solymosi

19 April 2016 31	Békéscsaba	1–1	Vasas	Békéscsaba
20:00 CEST (UTC+2)	Bényei (yellow card) 18'; Vaskó (yellow card) 57', (goal) 74'; Punoševac (yellow card) 59'; Piermayr (yellow card) 72'; Takács (yellow card) 77'	Report	Novák (yellow card) 7'; Szivacski (yellow card) 28'; Laczkó 50' (o.g.); Ádám (yellow card) 79'; Ristevski (yellow card) 81'; Adamović (yellow card) 90+3'	Stadium: Stadion Kórház utcai Attendance: 3,750; Referee: Ferenc Karakó

23 April 2016 32	Budapest Honvéd	2–1	Békéscsaba	Budapest
18:00 CEST (UTC+2)	Baráth 29'; Vasiljević 36'	Report	Laczkó 25', (red card) 90+2'; Piermayr (yellow card) 80'; Viczián (yellow card) 90+3'	Stadium: Bozsik József Stadion; Attendance: 1,284; Referee: Csaba Pintér

30 April 2016 33	Békéscsaba	0–0	Debrecen	Békéscsaba
16:30 CEST (UTC+2)	Juhász (yellow card) 57'; Punoševac (yellow card) 70'; Vaskó (yellow card) 76'	Report	Jovanović (yellow card) 34'; Brković (yellow card) 56'; Korhut (yellow card) 59'; Varga (yellow card) 65'; Lázár (yellow card) 90+3'	Stadium: Stadion Kórház utcai Attendance: 942; Referee: Ádám Németh

=== Magyar Kupa ===
12 August 2015 Round of 128	Csepel	0–1	Békéscsaba	Budapest
17:00 CEST (UTC+2)	K. Szabó (yellow card) 90'	Report	Szilágyi 75'; Bényei (yellow card) 87'; Borbély (yellow card) 88'	Stadium: Béke téri Stadion; Attendance: 500; Referee: Ádám Radványi

23 September 2015 Round of 64	Mezőkövesd	0–2 (a.e.t.)	Békéscsaba	Mezőkövesd
15:00 CEST (UTC+2)	Nánási (yellow card) 20'; Molnár (yellow card) 84'	Report	Borbély (yellow card) 29'; Szilágyi (yellow card) 45'; Kertész (yellow card) 73', (goal) 96'; Birtalan 99'	Stadium: Városi Stadion; Attendance: 600; Referee: Tamás Nazsa

14 October 2015 Round of 32	Kisvárda	1–2	Békéscsaba	Kisvárda
14:00 CEST (UTC+2)	Minczér (yellow card) 36'; Koszta 90+3'	Report	Korudzhiev 30' (pen.); Piermayr (yellow card) 42'; Juhász (yellow card) 66'; Borbély (yellow card) 69'; Bagi (yellow card) 75'; Laczkó 78'	Stadium: Várkerti Sporttelep; Attendance: 600; Referee: Viktor Kassai

Round of 16

27 October 2015 First leg	Békéscsaba	0–0	MTK Budapest	Békéscsaba
15:15 CET (UTC+1)	Spitzmüller (yellow card) 20'; Punoševac (yellow card) 29'	Report		Stadium: Stadion Kórház utcai Attendance: 361; Referee: János Takács

17 November 2015 Second leg	MTK Budapest	0–1 (0–1 agg.)	Békéscsaba	Budapest
17:30 CET (UTC+1)	Grgić (yellow card) 48'	Report	Viczián (yellow card) 71'; Damjanović 84'; Piermayr (yellow card) 89'	Stadium: Stadion Rudolf Illovszky; Attendance: 170; Referee: Péter Solymosi
Note: Békéscsaba won 1-0 on aggregate.

Quarter-finals

10 February 2016 First leg	Békéscsaba	2–1	Kozármisleny	Békéscsaba
18:00 CET (UTC+1)	Birtalan 6'; Kovács 27' (o.g.); Laczkó (yellow card) 67'; Hudák (yellow card) 89'	Report	Beke 16'; Puskás (yellow card) 90+1'	Stadium: Stadion Kórház utcai Attendance: 500; Referee: Balázs Berke
Note: The match was originally scheduled for 2 December 2015, but was postponed due to date clash with the postponement of the 15th round of the league.

2 March 2016 Second leg	Kozármisleny	1–1 (2–3 agg.)	Békéscsaba	Kozármisleny
13:30 CET (UTC+1)	Kocsis 12'; Beke (yellow card) 43'	Report	Damjanović (yellow card) 11'; Laczkó (yellow card) 45'; Punoševac 53'; Takács (red card) 75'	Stadium: Kozármislenyi Stadion; Attendance: 2,000; Referee: Ádám Németh
Note: Békéscsaba won 3-2 on aggregate.

Semi-finals

16 March 2016 First leg	Újpest	2–0	Békéscsaba	Budapest
16:00 CET (UTC+1)	Kabát (yellow card) 33'; Lencse 53', 87'	Report	Calvente (yellow card) 58'	Stadium: Ferenc Szusza Stadium; Attendance: 825; Referee: Péter Solymosi

12 April 2016 Second leg	Békéscsaba	1–1 (1–3 agg.)	Újpest	Békéscsaba
18:00 CEST (UTC+2)	Birtalan 35'; Laczkó (yellow card) 57'; Punoševac (yellow card) 84'	Report	Andrić 65'	Stadium: Stadion Kórház utcai Attendance: 659; Referee: Zsolt Szabó
Note: Újpest won 3-1 on aggregate.

== Statistics ==
=== Overall ===
Appearances (Apps) numbers are for appearances in competitive games only, including sub appearances.
Source: Competitions

No.	Player	Pos.	Nemzeti Bajnokság I				Magyar Kupa				Total			
No.	Player	Pos.	Apps	Goal	Booked	Sent off (straight red)	Apps	Goal	Booked	Sent off (straight red)	Apps	Goal	Booked	Sent off (straight red)
1	(Hungary) Roland Mursits	GK	13		1		4				17		1	
2	(Brazil) Fábio Guarú	DF	30		5		7				37		5	
4	(Hungary) Balázs Bényei	DF	28		9		6		1		34		10	
5	(Hungary) Balázs Koszó	DF	6				2				8			
6	(Hungary) Botond Birtalan	FW	28	4	5		7	3			35	7	5	
7	(Hungary) Dániel Szalai	FW	7		2	1	4				11		2	1
8	(Hungary) István Bagi	DF	5		1		5		1		10		2	
8	(England) Nathan Eccleston	FW	5	1			1				6	1		
9	(Hungary) Tamás Kertész	FW	6				4	1	1		10	1	1	
9	(Hungary) Péter Takács	MF	11		4		3			1	14		4	1
10	(Hungary) István Spitzmüller	MF	32		1		8		1		40		2	
11	(Hungary) Zsolt Balog	DF	9		1		2				11		1	
12	(Slovakia) Luboš Ilizi	GK	7		1		3				10		1	
12	(Hungary) Gábor Máthé	GK												
13	(Serbia) Bratislav Punoševac	FW	27	3	10		5	1	2		32	4	12	
14	(Hungary) Bálint Borbély	MF	14		5	1	4		3		18		8	1
15	(Hungary) Zsolt Fehér	DF	17		1		3				20		1	
17	(Hungary) László Oláh	FW	1				1				2			
18	(Hungary) Viktor Vadász	DF	7				4				11			
20	(Hungary) Péter Szilágyi	FW	12	1			4	1	1		16	2	1	
20	(Slovakia) Matúš Paukner	FW	9	1			4				13	1		
21	(Hungary) György Juhász	DF	6		1		4		1		10		2	
22	(Hungary) Ádám Viczián	DF	20	2	4		3		1		23	2	5	
23	(Montenegro) Slavko Damjanović	DF	20	1	2	1	7	1	1		27	2	3	1
24	(Spain) Ezequiel Calvente	FW	26	3	7		1		1		27	3	8	
25	(Austria) Thomas Piermayr	MF	23		9	1	8		2		31		11	1
27	(Hungary) Márkó Pilán	MF	2								2			
28	(Hungary) Tamás Vaskó	DF	22	3	5	1	6				28	3	5	1
30	(Ukraine) Oleksiy Shvedyuk	DF	2				1				3			
42	(Hungary) Norbert Szélpál	DF	1								1			
44	(Montenegro) Vukašin Poleksić	GK	13		2		3				16		2	
67	(Hungary) Martin Hudák	MF	4		1		2		1		6		2	
86	(Hungary) Zsolt Laczkó	FW	29	5	8	2	6	1	3		35	6	11	2
88	(Bulgaria) Georgi Korudzhiev	MF	9		3		3	1			12	1	3	
Own goals				1				1				2		
Totals				25	88	7		10	20	1		35	108	8

=== Clean sheets ===
			Clean sheets		
No.	Player	Games Played	Nemzeti Bajnokság I	Magyar Kupa	Total
44	(Montenegro) Vukašin Poleksić	16	5	0	5
12	(Slovakia) Luboš Ilizi	10	1	3	4
1	(Hungary) Roland Mursits	17	1	1	2
12	(Hungary) Gábor Máthé	0			0
Totals			7	4	11
