= 2019–20 Zalaegerszegi TE season =

Zalaegerszegi TE
2019–20 season
- Chairman: Gábor Végh
- Manager: Barna Dobos (until 10 February 2020); Gábor Márton
- NB 1: 7th
- Hungarian Cup: Quarter-final
- Top goalscorer: League: András Radó (13); All: Gergely Bobál (13); András Radó (13)
- Highest home attendance: 10,655 vs Ferencváros (22 September 2019)
- Lowest home attendance: 602 vs Kisvárda (5 February 2020)
| Home colours | Away colours |

The 2019–20 season was Zalaegerszegi TE's 1st competitive season, 39th consecutive season in the OTP Bank Liga and 99th year in existence as a football club.

== First team squad ==
As of 14 August 2019

Note: Flags indicate national team as defined under FIFA eligibility rules; some limited exceptions apply. Players may hold more than one non-FIFA nationality.

| No. | Pos. | Nation | Player |
|---|---|---|---|
| 1 | GK | HUN | Patrik Demjén |
| 4 | DF | CRO | Zoran Lesjak |
| 7 | FW | HUN | András Radó |
| 8 | MF | HUN | Zoltán Stieber |
| 10 | FW | HUN | Benjamin Babati |
| 11 | MF | UKR | Oleh Holodyuk |
| 12 | FW | HUN | Gergely Bobál |
| 13 | DF | HUN | Szilárd Devecseri |
| 17 | DF | HUN | Lóránt Sebestyén |
| 18 | MF | SRB | Miroslav Grumic |
| 19 | DF | SVK | János Szépe |
| 21 | MF | HUN | Gergő Kocsis |
| 22 | MF | SRB | Nikola Mitrovic |

| No. | Pos. | Nation | Player |
|---|---|---|---|
| 23 | FW | USA | Eduvie Ikoba |
| 25 | DF | HUN | Krisztián Tamás (on loan from Fehérvár) |
| 27 | DF | HUN | Bence Bedi |
| 31 | MF | HUN | Dávid Barczi |
| 34 | GK | HUN | Norbert Szemerédi |
| 44 | DF | HUN | Bence Gergényi |
| 46 | GK | HUN | Bence Köcse |
| 77 | DF | HUN | Bendegúz Bolla (on loan from Fehérvár) |
| 91 | MF | HUN | Máté Kiss |
| 94 | MF | HUN | Martin Hudák |
| — | DF | HUN | Dávid Bobál |

== Transfers ==
=== Summer ===
In: Note: Flags indicate national team as defined under FIFA eligibility rules; some limited exceptions apply. Players may hold more than one non-FIFA nationality.

| No. | Pos. | Nation | Player |
|---|---|---|---|
| 1 | GK | HUN | Patrik Demjén (from MTK Budapest) |
| 5 | DF | HUN | Dávid Bobál (from Paks) |
| 7 | FW | HUN | András Radó (from Puskás Akadémia) |
| 8 | MF | HUN | Zoltán Stieber (from (United States) D.C. United) |
| 11 | MF | UKR | Oleh Holodyuk (from Szombathely) |
| 17 | DF | HUN | Lóránt Sebestyén (from Zalaegerszeg U-19) |
| 22 | MF | SRB | Nikola Mitrović (from (Azerbaijan) Keşla) |
| 23 | FW | USA | Eduvie Ikoba (from (United States) Dartmouth) |
| 25 | DF | HUN | Krisztián Tamás (loan from Fehérvár) |
| 44 | DF | HUN | Bence Gergényi (loan from Budapest Honvéd) |
| 77 | DF | HUN | Bendegúz Bolla (loan from Fehérvár) |

Out: Note: Flags indicate national team as defined under FIFA eligibility rules; some limited exceptions apply. Players may hold more than one non-FIFA nationality.

| No. | Pos. | Nation | Player |
|---|---|---|---|
| 1 | GK | HUN | Illés Zöldesi (loan return to Kisvárda) |
| 7 | FW | HUN | Balázs Farkas (to Soroksár) |
| 9 | FW | HUN | Csanád Novák (loan return to Mezőkövesd) |
| 11 | FW | HUN | Zsolt Gajdos (to Szeged) |
| 22 | MF | HUN | Dániel Szökrönyös (loan to (Slovenia) Nafta) |
| 36 | GK | HUN | Dávid Macher (to Hévíz) |
| 80 | MF | CRO | Aljoša Vojnović (to Kaposvár) |
| 92 | FW | HUN | Zsolt Balázs (to Kaposvár) |

=== Winter ===
In: Note: Flags indicate national team as defined under FIFA eligibility rules; some limited exceptions apply. Players may hold more than one non-FIFA nationality.

| No. | Pos. | Nation | Player |
|---|---|---|---|
| 6 | MF | CYP | Fanos Katelaris (loan from (Cyprus) Omonia Nicosia) |
| 9 | FW | USA | Eric McWoods (from (Estonia) Narva Trans) |
| 11 | MF | HUN | Lukács Bőle (loan from Ferencváros) |
| 30 | MF | CRO | Stjepan Oštrek (loan from (Slovenia) Nafta) |
| 32 | DF | CRO | Matija Katanec (loan from Mezőkövesd) |
| — | MF | NGR | Meshack Ubochioma |
| — | MF | HUN | Dániel Szökrönyös (loan return from (Slovenia) Nafta) |

Out: Note: Flags indicate national team as defined under FIFA eligibility rules; some limited exceptions apply. Players may hold more than one non-FIFA nationality.

| No. | Pos. | Nation | Player |
|---|---|---|---|
| 11 | MF | UKR | Oleh Holodyuk |
| 13 | DF | HUN | Szilárd Devecseri (to Szombathelyi Haladás) |
| 17 | DF | HUN | Lóránt Sebestyén (loan to Hévíz) |
| 18 | MF | SRB | Miroslav Grumić (to Szeged) |
| 44 | DF | HUN | Bence Gergényi (loan to (Slovenia) Nafta) |
| 91 | MF | HUN | Máté Kiss (to Győr) |
| 94 | MF | HUN | Martin Hudák (to Szeged) |
| — | MF | NGR | Meshack Ubochioma (loan to (Slovenia) Nafta) |
| — | MF | HUN | Dániel Szökrönyös (loan to Hévíz) |

== Statistics ==
=== Appearances and goals ===
Last updated on 27 June 2020.

| No. | Pos | Nat | Player | Total | | OTP Bank Liga | | Hungarian Cup | |
| No. | Pos | Nat | Player | Apps | Goals | Apps | Goals | Apps | Goals |
|---|---|---|---|---|---|---|---|---|---|
| 1 | GK | (Hungary) HUN | Patrik Demjén | 37 | -53 | 33 | -44 | 4 | -9 |
| 4 | DF | (Croatia) CRO | Zoran Lesjak | 25 | 3 | 25 | 3 | 0 | 0 |
| 5 | DF | (Hungary) HUN | Dávid Bobál | 31 | 1 | 25 | 1 | 6 | 0 |
| 6 | MF | (Cyprus) CYP | Fanos Katelaris | 17 | 0 | 13 | 0 | 4 | 0 |
| 7 | FW | (Hungary) HUN | András Radó | 37 | 13 | 33 | 13 | 4 | 0 |
| 8 | MF | (Hungary) HUN | Zoltán Stieber | 25 | 3 | 22 | 2 | 3 | 1 |
| 9 | FW | (United States) USA | Eric McWoods | 10 | 2 | 6 | 1 | 4 | 1 |
| 10 | FW | (Hungary) HUN | Benjamin Babati | 27 | 4 | 21 | 3 | 6 | 1 |
| 11 | MF | (Hungary) HUN | Lukács Bőle | 12 | 3 | 11 | 3 | 1 | 0 |
| 12 | FW | (Hungary) HUN | Gergely Bobál | 32 | 13 | 29 | 10 | 3 | 3 |
| 19 | DF | (Slovakia) SVK | János Szépe | 19 | 1 | 15 | 0 | 4 | 1 |
| 21 | MF | (Hungary) HUN | Gergő Kocsis | 32 | 0 | 26 | 0 | 6 | 0 |
| 22 | MF | (Serbia) SRB | Nikola Mitrović | 32 | 3 | 31 | 3 | 1 | 0 |
| 23 | FW | (United States) USA | Eduvie Ikoba | 30 | 8 | 25 | 4 | 5 | 4 |
| 25 | DF | (Hungary) HUN | Krisztián Tamás | 17 | 0 | 17 | 0 | 0 | 0 |
| 27 | DF | (Hungary) HUN | Bence Bedi | 37 | 3 | 31 | 2 | 6 | 1 |
| 30 | MF | (Croatia) CRO | Stjepan Oštrek | 11 | 3 | 7 | 0 | 4 | 3 |
| 31 | MF | (Hungary) HUN | Dávid Barczi | 22 | 2 | 17 | 2 | 5 | 0 |
| 32 | MF | (Croatia) CRO | Matija Katanec | 12 | 0 | 9 | 0 | 3 | 0 |
| 77 | DF | (Hungary) HUN | Bendegúz Bolla | 29 | 1 | 27 | 1 | 2 | 0 |
Youth players:
| 15 | FW | (Hungary) HUN | Márk Abért | 1 | 0 | 0 | 0 | 1 | 0 |
| 34 | GK | (Hungary) HUN | Norbert Szemerédi | 3 | -4 | 0 | 0 | 3 | -4 |
| 46 | GK | (Hungary) HUN | Bence Köcse | 0 | 0 | 0 | 0 | 0 | 0 |
| 50 | DF | (Hungary) HUN | Olivér Hegedűs | 4 | 1 | 0 | 0 | 4 | 1 |
| 51 | MF | (Hungary) HUN | Zoltán Szökrönyös | 1 | 0 | 0 | 0 | 1 | 0 |
Out to loan:
| 17 | DF | (Hungary) HUN | Lóránt Sebestyén | 2 | 0 | 0 | 0 | 2 | 0 |
| 44 | DF | (Hungary) HUN | Bence Gergényi | 10 | 0 | 6 | 0 | 4 | 0 |
Players no longer at the club:
| 11 | MF | (Ukraine) UKR | Oleh Holodyuk | 6 | 0 | 5 | 0 | 1 | 0 |
| 13 | DF | (Hungary) HUN | Szilárd Devecseri | 13 | 1 | 10 | 1 | 3 | 0 |
| 18 | MF | (Serbia) SRB | Miroslav Grumić | 12 | 1 | 9 | 0 | 3 | 1 |
| 91 | MF | (Hungary) HUN | Máté Kiss | 3 | 0 | 2 | 0 | 1 | 0 |
| 94 | MF | (Hungary) HUN | Martin Hudák | 12 | 4 | 9 | 0 | 3 | 4 |

=== Top scorers ===
Includes all competitive matches. The list is sorted by shirt number when total goals are equal.

Last updated on 27 June 2020

| Position | Nation | Number | Name | OTP Bank Liga | Hungarian Cup | Total |
|---|---|---|---|---|---|---|
| 1 | (Hungary) | 7 | András Radó | 13 | 0 | 13 |
| 2 | (Hungary) | 12 | Gergely Bobál | 10 | 3 | 13 |
| 3 | (United States) | 23 | Eduvie Ikoba | 4 | 4 | 8 |
| 4 | (Hungary) | 10 | Benjamin Babati | 3 | 1 | 4 |
| 5 | (Hungary) | 94 | Martin Hudák | 0 | 4 | 4 |
| 6 | (Serbia) | 22 | Nikola Mitrović | 3 | 0 | 3 |
| 7 | (Croatia) | 4 | Zoran Lesjak | 3 | 0 | 3 |
| 8 | (Hungary) | 11 | Lukács Bőle | 3 | 0 | 3 |
| 9 | (Hungary) | 27 | Bence Bedi | 2 | 1 | 3 |
| 10 | (Hungary) | 8 | Zoltán Stieber | 2 | 1 | 3 |
| 11 | (Croatia) | 30 | Stjepan Oštrek | 0 | 3 | 3 |
| 12 | (Hungary) | 31 | Dávid Barczi | 2 | 0 | 2 |
| 13 | (United States) | 9 | Eric McWoods | 1 | 1 | 2 |
| 14 | (Hungary) | 13 | Szilárd Devecseri | 1 | 0 | 1 |
| 15 | (Hungary) | 5 | Dávid Bobál | 1 | 0 | 1 |
| 16 | (Hungary) | 77 | Bendegúz Bolla | 1 | 0 | 1 |
| 17 | (Serbia) | 18 | Miroslav Grumić | 0 | 1 | 1 |
| 18 | (Slovakia) | 19 | János Szépe | 0 | 1 | 1 |
| 19 | (Hungary) | 50 | Olivér Hegedűs | 0 | 1 | 1 |
| / | / | / | Own Goals | 2 | 1 | 3 |
| | | | TOTALS | 51 | 22 | 73 |

=== Disciplinary record ===
Includes all competitive matches. Players with 1 card or more included only.

Last updated on 27 June 2020

| Position | Nation | Number | Name | OTP Bank Liga | | Hungarian Cup | | Total (Hu Total) | |
| Position | Nation | Number | Name | Booked | Sent off (straight red) | Booked | Sent off (straight red) | Booked | Sent off (straight red) |
| GK | (Hungary) | 1 | Patrik Demjén | 2 | 0 | 0 | 0 | 2 (2) | 0 (0) |
| DF | (Croatia) | 4 | Zoran Lesjak | 3 | 0 | 0 | 0 | 3 (3) | 0 (0) |
| DF | (Hungary) | 5 | Dávid Bobál | 6 | 0 | 0 | 0 | 6 (6) | 0 (0) |
| MF | (Cyprus) | 6 | Fanos Katelaris | 4 | 0 | 0 | 0 | 4 (4) | 0 (0) |
| MF | (Hungary) | 7 | András Radó | 3 | 0 | 0 | 0 | 3 (3) | 0 (0) |
| MF | (Hungary) | 8 | Zoltán Stieber | 4 | 0 | 0 | 0 | 4 (4) | 0 (0) |
| FW | (United States) | 9 | Eric McWoods | 0 | 0 | 1 | 0 | 1 (0) | 0 (0) |
| FW | (Hungary) | 10 | Benjamin Babati | 2 | 0 | 2 | 0 | 4 (2) | 0 (0) |
| MF | (Hungary) | 11 | Lukács Bőle | 4 | 0 | 0 | 0 | 4 (4) | 0 (0) |
| MF | (Ukraine) | 11 | Oleh Holodyuk | 1 | 0 | 0 | 0 | 1 (1) | 0 (0) |
| FW | (Hungary) | 12 | Gergely Bobál | 1 | 0 | 0 | 0 | 1 (1) | 0 (0) |
| DF | (Hungary) | 13 | Szilárd Devecseri | 4 | 2 | 0 | 0 | 4 (4) | 2 (2) |
| DF | (Slovakia) | 19 | János Szépe | 1 | 1 | 0 | 0 | 1 (1) | 1 (1) |
| MF | (Hungary) | 21 | Gergő Kocsis | 6 | 1 | 1 | 0 | 7 (6) | 1 (1) |
| MF | (Serbia) | 22 | Nikola Mitrović | 8 | 0 | 0 | 0 | 8 (8) | 0 (0) |
| FW | (United States) | 23 | Eduvie Ikoba | 3 | 0 | 1 | 0 | 4 (3) | 0 (0) |
| DF | (Hungary) | 27 | Bence Bedi | 1 | 0 | 0 | 0 | 1 (1) | 0 (0) |
| MF | (Croatia) | 30 | Stjepan Oštrek | 0 | 0 | 1 | 0 | 1 (0) | 0 (0) |
| MF | (Hungary) | 31 | Dávid Barczi | 0 | 0 | 0 | 1 | 0 (0) | 1 (0) |
| MF | (Croatia) | 32 | Matija Katanec | 3 | 1 | 1 | 0 | 4 (3) | 1 (1) |
| GK | (Hungary) | 34 | Norbert Szemerédi | 1 | 0 | 0 | 0 | 1 (1) | 0 (0) |
| DF | (Hungary) | 44 | Bence Gergényi | 1 | 0 | 0 | 0 | 1 (1) | 0 (0) |
| DF | (Hungary) | 77 | Bendegúz Bolla | 5 | 1 | 0 | 0 | 5 (5) | 1 (1) |
| MF | (Hungary) | 94 | Martin Hudák | 1 | 0 | 0 | 0 | 1 (1) | 0 (0) |
| | | | TOTALS | 64 | 6 | 7 | 1 | 71 (64) | 7 (6) |

=== Overall ===
| Games played | 40 (33 OTP Bank Liga and 7 Hungarian Cup) |
| Games won | 16 (11 OTP Bank Liga and 5 Hungarian Cup) |
| Games drawn | 10 (10 OTP Bank Liga and 0 Hungarian Cup) |
| Games lost | 14 (12 OTP Bank Liga and 2 Hungarian Cup) |
| Goals scored | 73 |
| Goals conceded | 57 |
| Goal difference | +16 |
| Yellow cards | 71 |
| Red cards | 7 |
| Worst discipline | (Hungary) Gergő Kocsis (7 (yellow card) , 1 (red card) ) |
| Best result | 6–0 (A) v Kaposvár - Nemzeti Bajnokság I - 29-5-2020 |
| Worst result | 0–5 (A) v Fehérvár - Hungarian Cup - 11-3-2020 |
| Most appearances | (Hungary) Bence Bedi (37 appearances) |
| Most appearances | (Hungary) Patrik Demjén (37 appearances) |
| Most appearances | (Hungary) András Radó (37 appearances) |
| Top scorer | (Hungary) Gergely Bobál (13 goals) |
| Top scorer | (Hungary) András Radó (13 goals) |
| Points | 58/120 (48.33%) |

Last updated: 27 June 2020

== Nemzeti Bajnokság I ==
=== Matches ===
| 3 August 2019 1 | Mezőkövesd | 1 – 0 | Zalaegerszeg | Mezőkövesd, Borsod-Abaúj-Zemplén County |
| 19:30 CEST | Zivzivadze 20' | Report | | Stadium: Mezőkövesdi Városi Stadion; Attendance: 2,245; Referee: (Hungary) József Erdős |

| 22 September 2019 2 | Zalaegerszeg | 1 – 2 | Ferencváros | Zalaegerszeg, Zala County |
| 17:00 CEST | Ikoba 44' | Report | Leandro 88'; Nguen 90+2' | Stadium: ZTE Arena; Attendance: 10,665; Referee: (Hungary) Péter Solymosi |

| 17 August 2019 3 | Debrecen | 3 – 2 | Zalaegerszeg | Debrecen, Hajdú-Bihar County |
| 17:00 CEST | Trujić 3'; Szécsi 25'; Garba 66' | Report | Bedi 17'; Mitrović 64' | Stadium: Nagyerdei Stadion; Attendance: 4,150; Referee: Viktor Kassai |

| 24 August 2019 4 | Kaposvár | 0 – 4 | Zalaegerszeg | Kaposvár, Somogy County |
| 18:00 CEST | | Report | Radó 32' (pen.); Barczi 34'; Devecseri 83'; Ikoba 90' | Stadium: Rákóczi Stadion; Attendance: 2,410; Referee: (Hungary) Ferenc Karakó |

| 31 August 2019 5 | Zalaegerszeg | 1 – 1 | Puskás Akadémia | Zalaegerszeg, Zala County |
| 19:30 CEST | Radó 43' (pen.) | Report | Vaněček 36' | Stadium: ZTE Arena; Attendance: 4,858; Referee: (Hungary) Gergő Bogár |

| 14 September 2019 6 | Diósgyőr | 1 – 0 | Zalaegerszeg | Miskolc, Borsod-Abaúj-Zemplén County |
| 17:00 CEST | Brković 38' | Report | | Stadium: Diósgyőri Stadion; Attendance: 2,961; Referee: (Hungary) Zoltán Iványi |

| 28 September 2019 7 | Zalaegerszeg | 3 – 1 | Paks | Zalaegerszeg, Zala County |
| 17:00 CEST | Radó 27'; Stieber 36'; Mitrović 71' | Report | Böde 9' | Stadium: ZTE Arena; Attendance: 2,945; Referee: (Hungary) József Erdős |

| 5 October 2019 8 | Kisvárda | 3 – 3 | Zalaegerszeg | Kisvárda, Szabolcs-Szatmár-Bereg County |
| 17:00 CEST | Grozav 49'; Kravchenko 58'; Tischler 71' | Report | Bedi 26'; Radó 43' (pen.); Babati 84' (pen.) | Stadium: Várkerti Stadion; Attendance: 2,280; Referee: (Hungary) Csaba Pintér |

| 19 October 2019 9 | Zalaegerszeg | 0 – 1 | Budapest Honvéd | Zalaegerszeg, Zala County |
| 17:00 CEST | | Report | Lanzafame 77' | Stadium: ZTE Arena; Attendance: 4,023; Referee: Zoltán Iványi |

| 26 October 2019 10 | Újpest | 0 – 0 | Zalaegerszeg | Budapest, Pest County |
| 17:00 CEST | | Report | | Stadium: Illovszky Rudolf Stadion; Attendance: 2,619; Referee: (Hungary) Ferenc Karakó |

| 2 November 2019 11 | Zalaegerszeg | 3 – 3 | Fehérvár | Zalaegerszeg, Zala County |
| 17:00 CET | G. Bobál 6', 25'; Lesjak 90+3' | Report | Négo 51'; Hodžić 52'; Futács 83' | Stadium: ZTE Arena; Attendance: 4,038; Referee: Sándor Andó-Szabó |

| 9 November 2019 12 | Zalaegerszeg | 1 – 1 | Mezőkövesd | Zalaegerszeg, Zala County |
| 17:00 CET | G. Bobál 60' | Report | Zivzivadze 41' | Stadium: ZTE Arena; Attendance: 2,780; Referee: Viktor Kassai |

| 24 November 2019 13 | Ferencváros | 3 – 2 | Zalaegerszeg | Budapest |
| 18:00 CET | Boli 6'; Nguen 15'; Isael 45' | Report | Radó 18'; G. Bobál 60' | Stadium: Groupama Arena; Attendance: 9,123; Referee: Tamás Bognár |

| 30 November 2019 14 | Zalaegerszeg | 0 – 2 | Debrecen | Zalaegerszeg |
| 15:45 CET | | Report | Garba 10', 78' | Stadium: ZTE Arena; Attendance: 2,119; Referee: József Erdős |

| 7 December 2019 15 | Zalaegerszeg | 2 – 0 | Kaposvár | Zalaegerszeg |
| 17:00 CET | Ikoba 1'; Lesjak 38' | Report | | Stadium: ZTE Arena; Attendance: 1,222; Referee: Csaba Pintér |

| 14 December 2019 16 | Puskás Akadémia | 0 – 1 | Zalaegerszeg | Felcsút |
| 17:00 CET | | Report | G. Bobál 57' | Stadium: Pancho Aréna; Attendance: 1,018; Referee: Zoltán Iványi |

| 25 January 2020 17 | Zalaegerszeg | 1 – 3 | Diósgyőr | Zalaegerszeg |
| 17:00 CET | G. Bobál 47' (pen.) | Report | Brković 53'; Polgár 61'; Hasani 90+2' | Stadium: ZTE Arena; Attendance: 2,051; Referee: Ferenc Karakó |

| 1 February 2020 18 | Paks | 2 – 0 | Zalaegerszeg | Paks |
| 17:00 CET | Kelemen 25'; Böde 78' | Report | | Stadium: Fehérvári úti Stadion; Attendance: 1,119; Referee: Tamás Bognár |

| 5 February 2020 19 | Zalaegerszeg | 1 – 1 | Kisvárda | Zalaegerszeg |
| 18:00 CET | Ikoba 77' | Report | Viana 31' | Stadium: ZTE Arena; Attendance: 602; Referee: Sándor Andó-Szabó |

| 8 February 2020 20 | Budapest Honvéd | 2 – 0 | Zalaegerszeg | Budapest |
| 17:00 CET | Kálnoki-Kis 43'; Lanzafame 90+1' (pen.) | Report | | Stadium: Hidegkuti Nándor Stadion; Attendance: 2,246; Referee: József Erdős |

| 15 February 2020 21 | Zalaegerszeg | 2 – 1 | Újpest | Zalaegerszeg |
| 17:00 CET | Radó 28', 72' | Report | Calcan 17' | Stadium: ZTE Arena; Attendance: 3,089; Referee: Zoltán Iványi |

| 22 February 2020 22 | Fehérvár | 4 – 1 | Zalaegerszeg | Székesfehérvár |
| 17:00 CET | Stopira 5'; Petryak 49', 57', 61' | Report | Radó 85' (pen.) | Stadium: MOL Aréna Sóstó; Attendance: 2,395; Referee: Ádám Pillók |

| 29 February 2020 23 | Mezőkövesd | 1 – 2 | Zalaegerszeg | Mezőkövesd |
| 17:00 CET | Cseri 80' (pen.) | Report | Mitrović 39'; Bőle 46' | Stadium: Városi Stadion; Attendance: 1,479; Referee: István Vad |

| 7 March 2020 24 | Zalaegerszeg | 1 – 1 | Ferencváros | Zalaegerszeg |
| 19:30 CET | Radó 80' (pen.) | Report | Nguen 20' | Stadium: ZTE Arena; Attendance: 8,748; Referee: Ferenc Karakó |

| 14 March 2020 25 | Debrecen | 0 – 3 | Zalaegerszeg | Debrecen |
| 17:00 CET | | Report | G. Bobál 30'; Stieber 39'; Radó 87' | Stadium: Nagyerdei Stadion; Attendance: on closed Referee: Zoltán Iványi |

| 29 May 2020 26 | Kaposvár | 0 – 6 | Zalaegerszeg | Kaposvár |
| 20:00 CEST | | Report | Radó 6', 35'; Bőle 21', 31'; Barczi 28'; Lesjak 52' | Stadium: Rákóczi Stadion; Attendance: 500; Referee: József Erdős |

| 7 June 2020 27 | Zalaegerszeg | 2 – 0 | Puskás Akadémia | Zalaegerszeg |
| 18:55 CEST | G. Bobál 47'; D. Bobál 86' | Report | | Stadium: ZTE Arena; Attendance: 2,166; Referee: István Vad |

| 10 June 2020 28 | Diósgyőr | 1 – 1 | Zalaegerszeg | Miskolc |
| 16:55 CEST | Szépe 68' (o.g.) | Report | Bolla 80' | Stadium: Diósgyőri Stadion; Attendance: 2,895; Referee: József Erdős |

| 13 June 2020 29 | Zalaegerszeg | 3 – 3 | Paks | Zalaegerszeg |
| 21:05 CEST | Bobál 34', 71'; Szélpál 50' (o.g.) | Report | Könyves 12'; Böde 79' (pen.); Balogh 90+2' | Stadium: ZTE Arena; Attendance: 2,644; Referee: Sándor Andó-Szabó |

| 16 June 2020 30 | Kisvárda | 0 – 1 | Zalaegerszeg | Kisvárda |
| 19:00 CEST | | Report | Radó 83' | Stadium: Várkerti Stadion; Attendance: 815; Referee: Zoltán Iványi |

| 19 June 2020 31 | Zalaegerszeg | 2 – 0 | Budapest Honvéd | Zalaegerszeg |
| 20:00 CEST | Batik 51' (o.g.); Babati 90+2' | Report | | Stadium: ZTE Arena; Attendance: 4,745; Referee: Csaba Pintér |

| 23 June 2020 32 | Újpest | 2 – 1 | Zalaegerszeg | Budapest, Pest County |
| 21:05 CEST | Simon 37'; Ristevski 90+4' | Report | McWoods 83' | Stadium: Szusza Ferenc Stadion; Attendance: 2,636; Referee: István Vad |

| 27 June 2020 33 | Zalaegerszeg | 1 – 1 | Fehérvár | Zalaegerszeg |
| 15:15 CEST | Babati 83' | Report | Hodžić 4' | Stadium: ZTE Arena; Attendance: 4,429; Referee: Mihály Káprály |

=== League table ===
| Pos | Team | Pld | W | D | L | GF | GA | GD | Pts | Qualification or relegation |
|---|---|---|---|---|---|---|---|---|---|---|
| 5 | Honvéd | 33 | 12 | 8 | 13 | 36 | 44 | −8 | 44 | Qualification for the Europa League first qualifying round (Note: Budapest Honvéd qualified for the Europa League first qualifying round by winning the 2019–20 Magyar Kupa.) |
| 6 | Újpest | 33 | 12 | 7 | 14 | 45 | 45 | 0 | 43 | |
| 7 | Zalaegerszeg | 33 | 11 | 10 | 12 | 51 | 44 | +7 | 43 | |
| 8 | Kisvárda | 33 | 12 | 6 | 15 | 42 | 43 | −1 | 42 | |
| 9 | Diósgyőr | 33 | 12 | 5 | 16 | 40 | 52 | −12 | 41 | |

Source: Hungarian Football Federation (in Hungarian), Soccerway
Rules for classification: 1) Points; 2) Matches won; 3) Goal difference; 4) Goals scored; 5) Head-to-head points; 6) Head-to-head goal difference; 7) Head-to-head away goals scored; 8) Fair play ranking; 9) Drawing of lots.

=== Results summary ===
| Overall | | | | | | | | Home | | | | | | Away | | | | | |
| Pld | W | D | L | GF | GA | GD | Pts | W | D | L | GF | GA | GD | W | D | L | GF | GA | GD |
|---|---|---|---|---|---|---|---|---|---|---|---|---|---|---|---|---|---|---|---|
| 33 | 11 | 10 | 12 | 51 | 44 | +7 | 43 | 5 | 7 | 4 | 24 | 21 | +3 | 6 | 3 | 8 | 27 | 23 | +4 |

Last updated: 27 June 2020.
Source: NB1

=== Results by round ===
| Round | 1 | 2 | 3 | 4 | 5 | 6 | 7 | 8 | 9 | 10 | 11 | 12 | 13 | 14 | 15 | 16 | 17 | 18 | 19 | 20 | 21 | 22 | 23 | 24 | 25 | 26 | 27 | 28 | 29 | 30 | 31 | 32 | 33 |
|---|---|---|---|---|---|---|---|---|---|---|---|---|---|---|---|---|---|---|---|---|---|---|---|---|---|---|---|---|---|---|---|---|---|
| Ground | A | H | A | A | H | A | H | A | H | A | H | H | A | H | H | A | H | A | H | A | H | A | A | H | A | A | H | A | H | A | H | A | H |
| Result | L | L | L | W | D | L | W | D | L | D | D | D | L | L | W | W | L | L | D | L | W | L | W | D | W | W | W | D | D | W | W | L | D |
| Position | 10 | 10 | 10 | 9 | 8 | 10 | 8 | 9 | 10 | 11 | 11 | 11 | 11 | 11 | 11 | 11 | 11 | 11 | 11 | 11 | 11 | 11 | 11 | 11 | 11 | 8 | 8 | 9 | 8 | 7 | 5 | 6 | 7 |

Updated to match(es) played on 27 June 2020. Source: Matches
A = Away; H = Home; W = Win; D = Draw; L = Loss

== Hungarian Cup ==
| 25 September 2019 6 | Kiskunfélegyháza | 1 – 5 | Zalaegerszeg | Kiskunfélegyháza, Bács-Kiskun County |
| 15:00 CEST | Antman 68' | Report | G. Bobál 27'; Hudák 36', 43', 53', 58' | Stadium: Kiskunfélegyházi HTK Sporttelep; Attendance: 1,200; Referee: (Hungary) Bence Csonka |

| 30 October 2019 7 | Budaörs | 3 – 7 | Zalaegerszeg | Csákvár, Fejér County |
| 12:30 CET | Végh 34'; Kulcsár 37'; Gyurácz 57' | Report | Grumić 4'; G. Bobál 17', 87'; Gyurácz 23' (o.g.); Ikoba 61', 83'; Stieber 72' | Stadium: Tresztyánszky Ödön Sportközpont; Referee: (Hungary) Gergely Szőts |

| 4 December 2019 8 | Szarvas | 0 – 2 | Zalaegerszeg | Szarvas, Békés County |
| 15:00 CEST | | Report | Szépe 16'; Ikoba 43' | Stadium: Erzsébetligeti Sporttelep; Attendance: 1,000; Referee: (Hungary) Tamás Nazsa |

| 12 February 2020 Round of 32 (1st leg) | Lipót | 3 – 1 | Zalaegerszeg | Lipót, Győr-Moson-Sopron County |
| 14:00 CET | Harsányi 7'; Csete 57'; Zimonyi 76' | Report | Oštrek 61' | Stadium: Lipót Sportkomplexum; Attendance: 400; Referee: (Hungary) Ákos Gaál |

| 19 February 2020 Round of 32 (2nd leg) | Zalaegerszeg | 5 – 1 (6 – 4 agg.) | Lipót | Zalaegerszeg, Zala County |
| 18:00 CET | McWoods 30'; Oštrek 32', 61'; Bedi 55'; Babati 69' | Report | Zimonyi 75' | Stadium: ZTE Arena; Attendance: 1,062; Referee: (Hungary) Gábor Barna |

| 4 March 2020 Quarter-final (1st leg) | Zalaegerszeg | 2 – 0 | Fehérvár | Zalaegerszeg |
| 20:00 CET | Ikoba 83'; Hegedűs 87' | Report | | Stadium: ZTE Arena; Attendance: 823; Referee: Bence Csonka |

| 11 March 2020 Quarter-final (2nd leg) | Fehérvár | 5 – 0 (5 – 2 agg.) | Zalaegerszeg | Székesfehérvár |
| 17:30 CET | Hodžić 7', 61'; Bamgboye 26'; Houri 28'; Nikolić 89' | Report | | Stadium: MOL Aréna Sóstó; Attendance: 1,731; Referee: Gergő Bogár |
