= Martin Hudák =

Hungarian footballer (born 1994)

Personal information
- Date of birth: 22 February 1994 (age 32)
- Place of birth: Szarvas, Hungary
- Height: 1.87 m (6 ft 2 in)
- Position: Midfielder

Team information
- Current team: Gyirmót
- Number: 30

Youth career
- 2004–2011: Békéscsaba
- 2011–2014: Videoton
- 2014–2015: Puskás Akadémia

Senior career*
Years	Team	Apps	(Gls)
2012–2014	Videoton	0	(0)
2013–2014	Videoton II	26	(7)
2014–2018	Puskás Akadémia	12	(0)
2015–2018	Puskás Akadémia II	56	(19)
2016	→ Békéscsaba (loan)	4	(0)
2016	→ Békéscsaba II (loan)	1	(0)
2018–2020	Zalaegerszeg	54	(6)
2020	Szeged	7	(0)
2020	Szeged II	1	(2)
2020–2023	Soroksár	93	(10)
2023	Mezőkövesd	3	(0)
2023–2024	Pécs	26	(2)
2024–	Gyirmót	29	(2)

International career^{‡}
2014	Hungary U21	1	(0)
- * Club domestic league appearances and goals as of 17 August 2025 ‡ National team caps and goals as of 10 October 2014

Martin Hudák (born 22 February 1994) is a Hungarian professional footballer, who plays as a midfielder for Nemzeti Bajnokság III club Gyirmót. He represented Hungary at youth level.

== Career ==
On 4 January 2020, Hudák signed a one-and-a-half-year deal with Nemzeti Bajnokság II club Szeged.

On 15 June 2023, he signed with Nemzeti Bajnokság I club Mezőkövesd. After two months, the club announced that Hudák left by mutual agreement on 17 August and was joining Nemzeti Bajnokság II side Pécs.

== Career statistics ==
As of match played 17 August 2025

Appearances and goals by club, season and competition
Club	Season	League			Magyar Kupa		Ligakupa		Europe		Other		Total	
Club	Season	Division	Apps	Goals	Apps	Goals	Apps	Goals	Apps	Goals	Apps	Goals	Apps	Goals
Videoton	2012–13	Nemzeti Bajnokság I	—		—		3	0	—		—		3	0
Videoton	2013–14	Nemzeti Bajnokság I	0	0	0	0	3	0	—		—		3	0
Videoton	Total		0	0	0	0	6	0	—		—		6	0
Videoton II	2012–13	Nemzeti Bajnokság III	1	0	—		—		—		2 (Note: Appearances in Nemzeti Bajnokság III relegation play-offs)	1	3	1
Videoton II	2013–14	Nemzeti Bajnokság III	25	7	—		—		—		—		25	7
Videoton II	Total		26	7	—		—		—		2	1	28	8
Puskás Akadémia	2014–15	Nemzeti Bajnokság I	4	0	2	0	5	0	—		—		11	0
Puskás Akadémia	2015–16	Nemzeti Bajnokság I	8	0	2	0	—		—		—		10	0
Puskás Akadémia	2016–17	Nemzeti Bajnokság II	0	0	2	1	—		—		—		2	1
Puskás Akadémia	Total		12	0	6	1	5	0	—		—		23	1
Puskás Akadémia II	2015–16	Nemzeti Bajnokság III	12	2	—		—		—		—		12	2
Puskás Akadémia II	2016–17	Nemzeti Bajnokság III	30	11	—		—		—		—		30	11
Puskás Akadémia II	2017–18	Nemzeti Bajnokság III	14	11	—		—		—		—		14	6
Puskás Akadémia II	Total		56	19	—		—		—		—		56	19
Békéscsaba (loan)	2015–16	Nemzeti Bajnokság I	4	0	2	0	—		—		—		6	0
Békéscsaba II (loan)	2015–16	Nemzeti Bajnokság III	1	0	—		—		—		—		1	0
Zalaegerszeg	2017–18	Nemzeti Bajnokság II	16	0	2	0	—		—		—		18	0
Zalaegerszeg	2018–19	Nemzeti Bajnokság II	29	6	2	0	—		—		—		31	6
Zalaegerszeg	2019–20	Nemzeti Bajnokság I	9	0	3	4	—		—		—		12	4
Zalaegerszeg	Total		54	6	7	4	—		—		—		61	10
Szeged	2019–20	Nemzeti Bajnokság II	6	0	—		—		—		—		6	0
Szeged	2020–21	Nemzeti Bajnokság II	1	0	—		—		—		—		1	0
Szeged	Total		7	0	—		—		—		—		7	0
Szeged II	2020–21	Megyei Bajnokság I	1	2	—		—		—		—		1	2
Soroksár	2020–21	Nemzeti Bajnokság II	25	1	2	0	—		—		—		27	1
Soroksár	2021–22	Nemzeti Bajnokság II	32	3	1	0	—		—		—		33	3
Soroksár	2022–23	Nemzeti Bajnokság II	36	6	1	0	—		—		—		37	6
Soroksár	Total		93	10	4	0	—		—		—		97	10
Mezőkövesd	2023–24	Nemzeti Bajnokság I	3	0	—		—		—		—		3	0
Pécs	2023–24	Nemzeti Bajnokság II	26	2	1	0	—		—		—		27	2
Gyirmót	2024–25	Nemzeti Bajnokság II	25	2	3	0	—		—		—		28	2
Gyirmót	2025–26	Nemzeti Bajnokság III	4	0	1	0	—		—		—		5	0
Gyirmót	Total		29	2	4	0	—		—		—		33	2
Career total			312	48	24	5	11	0	—		2	1	349	54

== Honours ==
Videoton

- Ligakupa runner-up: 2012–13, 2013–14

Zalaegerszeg

- Nemzeti Bajnokság II: 2018–19
