= Ádám Viczián =

Hungarian footballer (born 1995)

- Viczián playing for Békéscsaba in 2026

Personal information
- Date of birth: 24 November 1995 (age 30)
- Place of birth: Békéscsaba, Hungary
- Height: 1.87 m (6 ft 2 in)
- Position: Defender

Team information
- Current team: Gyula
- Number: 23

Youth career
- 2004–2014: Békéscsaba

Senior career*
Years	Team	Apps	(Gls)
2011–2019	Békéscsaba	143	(15)
2011–2017	Békéscsaba II	10	(6)
2012–2013	Békéscsaba U19	12	(8)
2019–2022	Vasas	49	(3)
2022–2024	Diósgyőr	9	(0)
2022–2024	Diósgyőr II	4	(0)
2023–2024	→ Tiszakécske (loan)	25	(0)
2024–2026	Békéscsaba	45	(3)
2024	Békéscsaba II	2	(0)
2026–	Gyula	7	(0)
- * Club domestic league appearances and goals as of 19 September 2026

Ádám Viczián (born 24 November 1995) is a Hungarian professional footballer, who plays as a defender for Nemzeti Bajnokság III club Gyula.

== Career ==
A youth product of Békéscsaba, Viczián played in the first team for years and was a key player of the promoted Nemzeti Bajnokság I team in the 2015–16 season.

He returned to newly promoted Nemzeti Bajnokság II side Békéscsaba on 4 July 2024.

== Career statistics ==
As of match played 19 September 2026

Appearances and goals by club, season and competition
Club	Season	League			Magyar Kupa		Ligakupa		Total	
Club	Season	Division	Apps	Goals	Apps	Goals	Apps	Goals	Apps	Goals
Békéscsaba	2010–11	Nemzeti Bajnokság II	2	0	—		—		2	0
Békéscsaba	2012–13	Nemzeti Bajnokság II	1	0	1	0	—		2	0
Békéscsaba	2013–14	Nemzeti Bajnokság II	3	0	—		—		3	0
Békéscsaba	2014–15	Nemzeti Bajnokság II	17	2	2	1	3	0	22	3
Békéscsaba	2015–16	Nemzeti Bajnokság I	20	2	3	0	—		23	2
Békéscsaba	2016–17	Nemzeti Bajnokság II	34	3	1	0	—		35	3
Békéscsaba	2017–18	Nemzeti Bajnokság II	32	1	5	1	—		37	2
Békéscsaba	2018–19	Nemzeti Bajnokság II	34	7	3	0	—		37	7
Békéscsaba	Total		143	15	15	2	3	0	161	17
Békéscsaba II	2011–12	Megyei Bajnokság III	4	2	—		—		4	2
Békéscsaba II	2015–16	Nemzeti Bajnokság III	5	2	—		—		5	2
Békéscsaba II	2016–17	Nemzeti Bajnokság III	1	2	—		—		1	2
Békéscsaba II	Total		10	6	—		—		10	6
Békéscsaba U19	2012–13	Megyei Bajnokság III	12	8	—		—		12	8
Vasas	2019–20	Nemzeti Bajnokság II	16	1	2	0	—		18	1
Vasas	2020–21	Nemzeti Bajnokság II	27	2	2	0	—		29	2
Vasas	2021–22	Nemzeti Bajnokság II	6	0	1	0	—		7	0
Vasas	Total		49	3	5	0	—		54	3
Diósgyőr	2022–23	Nemzeti Bajnokság II	9	0	0	0	—		9	0
Diósgyőr II	2022–23	Nemzeti Bajnokság III	1	0	—		—		1	0
Diósgyőr II	2023–24	Nemzeti Bajnokság III	3	0	—		—		3	0
Diósgyőr II	Total		4	0	—		—		4	0
Tiszakécske (loan)	2023–24	Nemzeti Bajnokság II	25	0	2	1	—		27	1
Békéscsaba	2024–25	Nemzeti Bajnokság II	23	2	—		—		23	2
Békéscsaba	2025–26	Nemzeti Bajnokság II	22	1	2	0	—		24	1
Békéscsaba	Total		45	3	2	0	—		47	3
Békéscsaba II	2024–25	Megyei Bajnokság I	2	0	—		—		2	0
Gyula	2026–27	Nemzeti Bajnokság III	7	0	3	0	—		10	0
Career total			306	35	27	3	3	0	336	38

== Honours ==
Vasas

- Nemzeti Bajnokság II: 2021–22

Diósgyőr

- Nemzeti Bajnokság II: 2022–23

Békéscsaba II

- Megyei Bajnokság I – Békés: 2024–25
