= Thomas Piermayr =

Austrian footballer

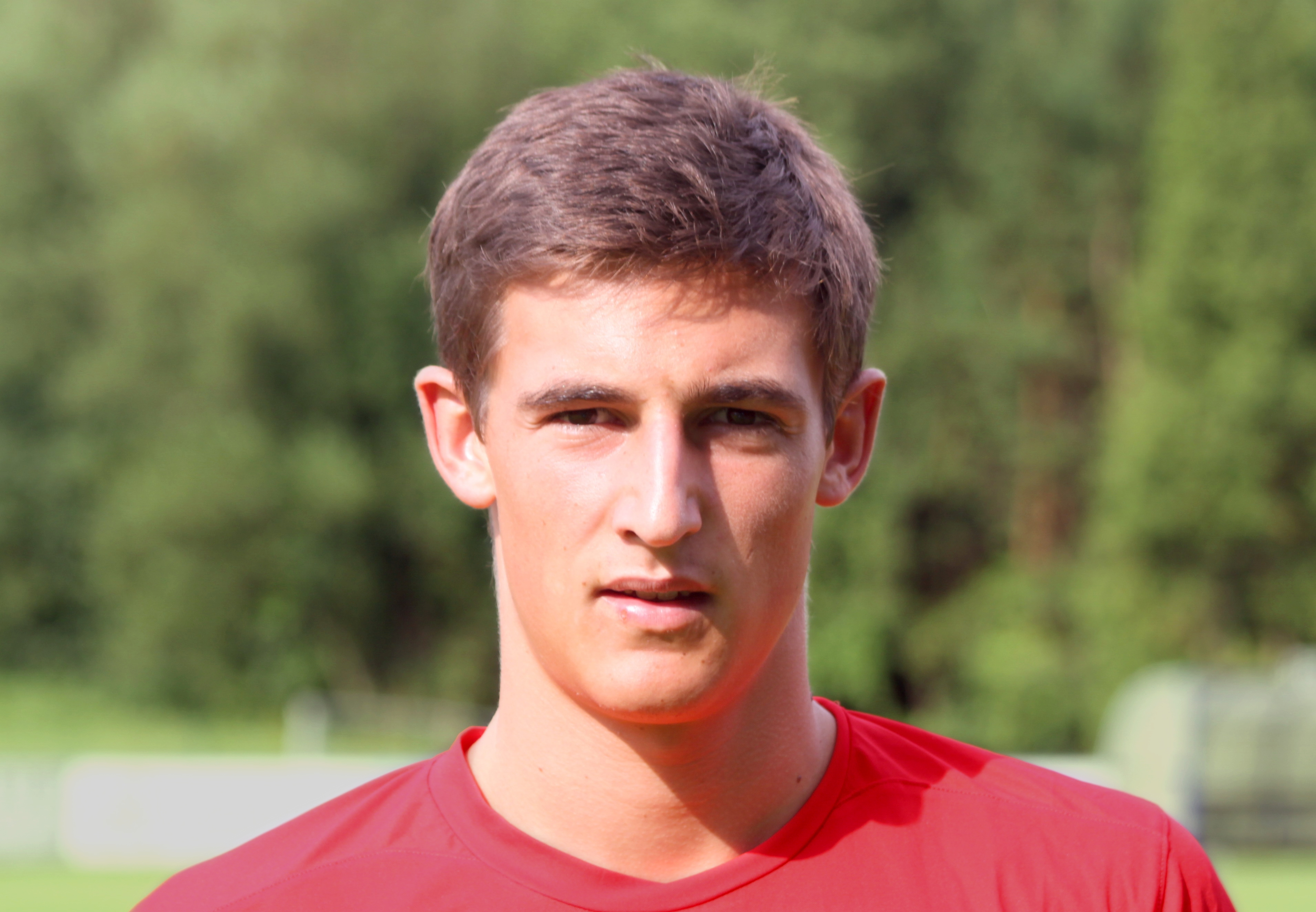

Personal information
- Date of birth: 2 August 1989 (age 37)
- Place of birth: Linz, Austria
- Height: 1.84 m (6 ft 0 in)
- Positions: Defensive midfielder; centre back

Team information
- Current team: SC Bad Sauerbrunn

Senior career*
Years	Team	Apps	(Gls)
2008–2011	LASK Linz	78	(4)
2011–2012	Inverness Caledonian Thistle	20	(0)
2012–2013	Wiener Neustadt	21	(0)
2013	Lillestrøm	10	(0)
2014	Colorado Rapids	14	(0)
2015	Minsk	10	(0)
2015–2016	Békéscsaba	23	(0)
2017	AFC Eskilstuna	25	(0)
2018	Juniors OÖ	12	(2)
2018–2019	Olympiakos Nicosia	26	(2)
2019–2022	Wiener Neustadt	48	(1)
2022	SC Bad Sauerbrunn	15	(0)
2023	Wiener Neustadt	9	(0)
2023–	SC Bad Sauerbrunn	24	(0)

International career
2008	Austria U20	1	(1)
2009–2010	Austria U21	10	(0)
- * Club domestic league appearances and goals as of 30 June 2024

Thomas Piermayr (born 2 August 1989) is an Austrian footballer who plays for SC Bad Sauerbrunn.

== Career ==
Piermayr started his career in 2008 with LASK Linz, for whom he played 78 games as a defender. He then signed for a one-year deal with Inverness in July 2011, after impressing manager Terry Butcher during the preseason. He left Inverness at the end of the season and signed for Wiener Neustadt. On 9 July 2013 he signed a contract with Lillestrøm out the season.

He has also represented the Austria national under-21 football team.

== Career statistics ==
As of 21 November 2013

Season	Club	Division	League		Cup		Total	
Season	Club	Division	Apps	Goals	Apps	Goals	Apps	Goals
2008–09	LASK Linz	Bundesliga	26	2	0	0	26	2
2009–10	LASK Linz	Bundesliga	29	0	2	0	31	0
2010–11	LASK Linz	Bundesliga	23	2	1	0	24	2
2011–12	Inverness Caledonian Thistle	SPL	20	0	3	0	23	0
2012–13	SC Wiener Neustadt	Bundesliga	21	0	1	0	22	0
2013	Lillestrøm	Tippeligaen	10	0	1	0	11	0
Career Total			129	4	8	0	137	4
