= Ezequiel Calvente =

Spanish professional footballer

Ezequiel
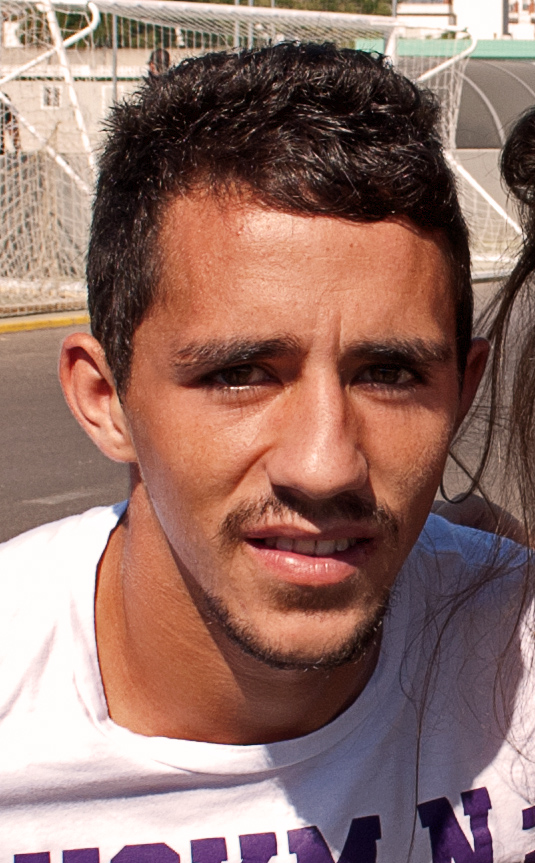
- Ezequiel in 2011

Personal information
- Full name: Ezequiel Calvente Criado
- Date of birth: 12 January 1991 (age 35)
- Place of birth: Melilla, Spain
- Height: 1.69 m (5 ft 7 in)
- Position: Winger

Team information
- Current team: Céltic Pulianas

Youth career
- 2001–2002: Granada
- 2002–2010: Betis

Senior career*
Years	Team	Apps	(Gls)
2010–2011	Betis B	19	(4)
2010–2014	Betis	33	(1)
2012	→ Sabadell (loan)	15	(2)
2012–2013	→ SC Freiburg (loan)	2	(0)
2012–2013	→ SC Freiburg II (loan)	5	(0)
2013–2014	→ Recreativo (loan)	22	(1)
2015	Penafiel	6	(0)
2015–2018	Békéscsaba	26	(3)
2016–2017	→ Haladás (loan)	1	(0)
2018	Debrecen	4	(1)
2019–2020	Ceuta	4	(0)
2020–2021	Eldense	5	(0)
2021	Jaén	16	(2)
2021–2023	Arenas	30	(3)
2023–2024	Huétor Tájar	18	(0)
2024–2025	Maracena	19	(4)
2025–	Céltic Pulianas	24	(5)

International career
2010	Spain U19	3	(1)
2011	Spain U20	4	(0)
- * Club domestic league appearances and goals as of 14:30, 19 June 2026 (UTC)

Ezequiel Calvente Criado (born 12 January 1991), known simply as Ezequiel, is a Spanish professional footballer who plays as a left winger for Céltic Pulianas.

== Club career ==
Ezequiel was born in Melilla. After playing in every youth rank at Real Betis, he made his first-team debut as a second-half substitute in a 4–1 home win against Granada CF in the Segunda División. Three days later, he started the 2–1 home victory over UD Salamanca in the second round of the Copa del Rey, and signed a professional contract the following day until July 2014.

On 29 January 2012, Ezequiel was loaned to CE Sabadell FC of the second division until June. In late July, after an unsuccessful trial with Borussia Mönchengladbach, he moved, still on loan, to another club in Germany and the Bundesliga, SC Freiburg, which had the option of signing him permanently at the end of the campaign. After only two substitute appearances, and five for the reserves, he spent the next season on loan at division two side Recreativo de Huelva.

In January 2015, after months as a free agent, Ezequiel signed for F.C. Penafiel. After roughly 300 minutes of action and relegation from the Primeira Liga, he switched countries again in August when he joined Hungary's Békéscsaba 1912 Előre. On 5 July 2016, he was loaned to Szombathelyi Haladás also in the Nemzeti Bajnokság I after his team's descent.

== International career ==
On 24 July 2010, whilst representing Spain's under-19 at the 2010 UEFA European Championship, Ezequiel scored from a penalty kick against Italy in the group stage. It was described by British newspaper The Guardian as being "on an altogether higher plane of spot-kick audacity", as the player kicked it with what looked to be his standing leg, fooling the goalkeeper into going the other way; the national side eventually finished in second position in France.

== Honours ==
Betis

- Segunda División: 2010–11
