= Georgi Korudzhiev =

Bulgarian footballer (born 1988)

Personal information
- Full name: Georgi Asenov Korudzhiev
- Date of birth: 2 March 1988 (age 38)
- Place of birth: Sofia, Bulgaria
- Height: 1.74 m (5 ft 8 1/2 in)
- Position: Defensive midfielder

Youth career
- Levski Sofia

Senior career*
Years	Team	Apps	(Gls)
2006–2007	Sopron	13	(3)
2007–2008	Botev Plovdiv	1	(0)
2008–2009	Spartak Plovdiv	11	(0)
2009–2010	Sportist Svoge	28	(1)
2011	Zimbru Chişinău	15	(0)
2011–2012	Kaliakra Kavarna	16	(0)
2012–2013	Bihor Oradea	3	(0)
2013	Spartak Varna	11	(1)
2014	Lokomotiv Plovdiv	4	(0)
2014–2015	Haskovo	19	(1)
2015–2016	Békéscsaba	9	(0)
2016	Montana	16	(0)
2017–2018	Tsarsko Selo	29	(5)
- * Club domestic league appearances and goals as of 26 May 2018

Georgi Korudzhiev (Bulgarian: Георги Коруджиев; born 2 March 1988) is a Bulgarian footballer who plays as a midfielder.
