= Gergely Bobál =

Hungarian footballer

Personal information
- Date of birth: 31 August 1995 (age 31)
- Place of birth: Pásztó, Hungary
- Height: 1.88 m (6 ft 2 in)
- Position: Forward

Team information
- Current team: Unirea Slobozia
- Number: 9

Youth career
- 2003–2007: Salgótarján
- 2007–2010: Vasas
- 2010–2013: Honvéd

Senior career*
Years	Team	Apps	(Gls)
2012–2018	Honvéd	18	(0)
2013–2017	Honvéd II	46	(30)
2015	→ Gyirmót (loan)	14	(6)
2015–2016	→ Wolfsburg II (loan)	27	(10)
2016–2017	→ Zalaegerszeg (loan)	29	(12)
2018–2019	Csákvár	37	(17)
2019–2020	Zalaegerszeg	46	(19)
2020–2021	Nacional	2	(0)
2021–2023	Vasas	19	(1)
2022–2023	→ Mezőkövesd (loan)	14	(1)
2023–2024	Budapest Honvéd	22	(6)
2024–2025	Ajka	23	(2)
2025–2026	Videoton	7	(0)
2026	Gyirmót	13	(1)
2026–	Unirea Slobozia	12	(3)

International career
2010–2011	Hungary U16	13	(5)
2011–2012	Hungary U17	12	(10)
2013	Hungary U18	4	(1)
2012–2014	Hungary U19	16	(7)
2014	Hungary U20	3	(0)
2014	Hungary U21	1	(0)
- * Club domestic league appearances and goals as of 31 October 2026

Gergely Bobál (born 31 August 1995) is a Hungarian professional footballer who plays as a forward for Liga II club Unirea Slobozia.

== Club career ==
On 29 August 2022, Bobál joined Mezőkövesd on a season-long loan.

== Honours ==
Wolfsburg II

- Regionalliga Nord: 2015–16

Zalaegerszeg

- Nemzeti Bajnokság II: 2018–19

Vasas

- Nemzeti Bajnokság II: 2021–22
