= Zsolt Laczkó =

Hungarian footballer (born 1986)

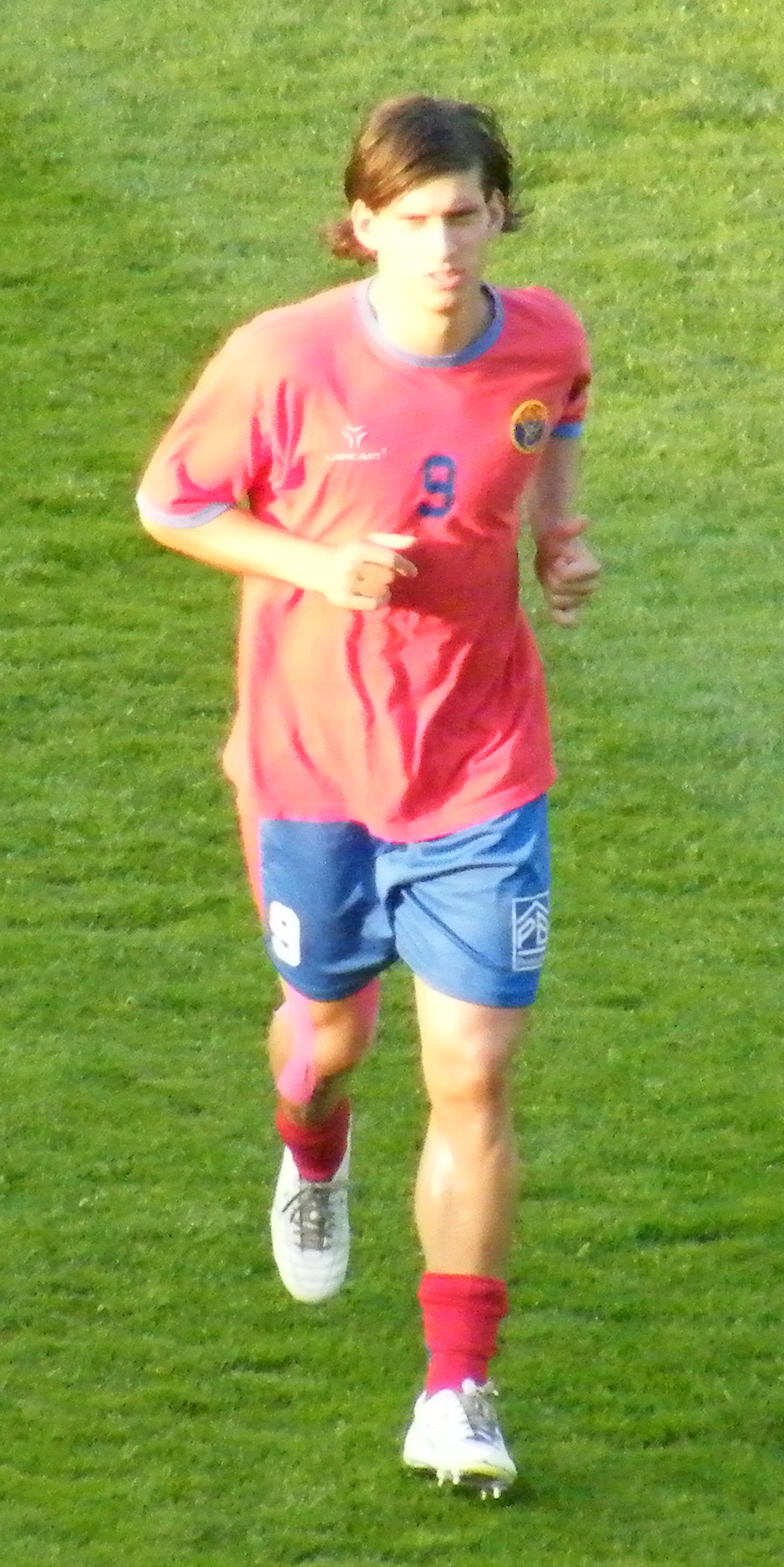
- Laczkó playing for Vasas SC

Personal information
- Date of birth: 18 December 1986 (age 39)
- Place of birth: Szeged, Hungary
- Height: 1.84 m (6 ft 0 in)
- Positions: Left wing back; winger

Team information
- Current team: Hungary (assistant)

Youth career
- 1999–2004: Ferencváros

Senior career*
Years	Team	Apps	(Gls)
2004–2007	Ferencváros	57	(14)
2007–2008	Olympiacos	0	(0)
2007	→ Levadiakos (loan)	7	(0)
2008	→ Leicester City (loan)	9	(0)
2008–2009	Vasas	23	(0)
2009–2011	Debrecen	35	(2)
2011–2014	Sampdoria	36	(0)
2012–2013	→ Vicenza (loan)	13	(0)
2013–2014	→ Padova (loan)	15	(0)
2014	Ferencváros	4	(0)
2014–2015	Kecskemét	15	(0)
2015–2016	Békéscsaba	29	(5)
2016–2018	Paks	11	(0)
2017	→ Honvéd (loan)	16	(0)
2018	Vasas	4	(0)
2018–2019	III. Kerületi TVE	6	(0)

International career^{‡}
2007–2008	Hungary U21	5	(0)
2010–2013	Hungary	22	(0)
- * Club domestic league appearances and goals as of 21 October 2018 ‡ National team caps and goals as of 7 September 2012

Zsolt Laczkó (born 18 December 1986) is a Hungarian former professional footballer who last played as a left wing back or winger for III. Kerületi TVE.

== Club career ==
=== Ferencváros ===
Zsolt Laczkó was born in Szeged, Hungary. He debuted in the Hungarian National Championship I in 2004. He played for Ferencvárosi TC 44 matches and scored 12 goals.

=== Olympiacos ===
Laczkó was a free agent and joined Olympiacos's pre-season training. Laczkó was given a trial period in which he played in two friendlies – one of which he scored in – and impressed Olympiacos coach Takis Lemonis enough to be rewarded with a contract with the club. On 25 July 2007, he signed a four-year deal with the club, but was subsequently loaned out to fellow Super League side Levadiakos shortly after signing.

==== Loan to Leicester City ====
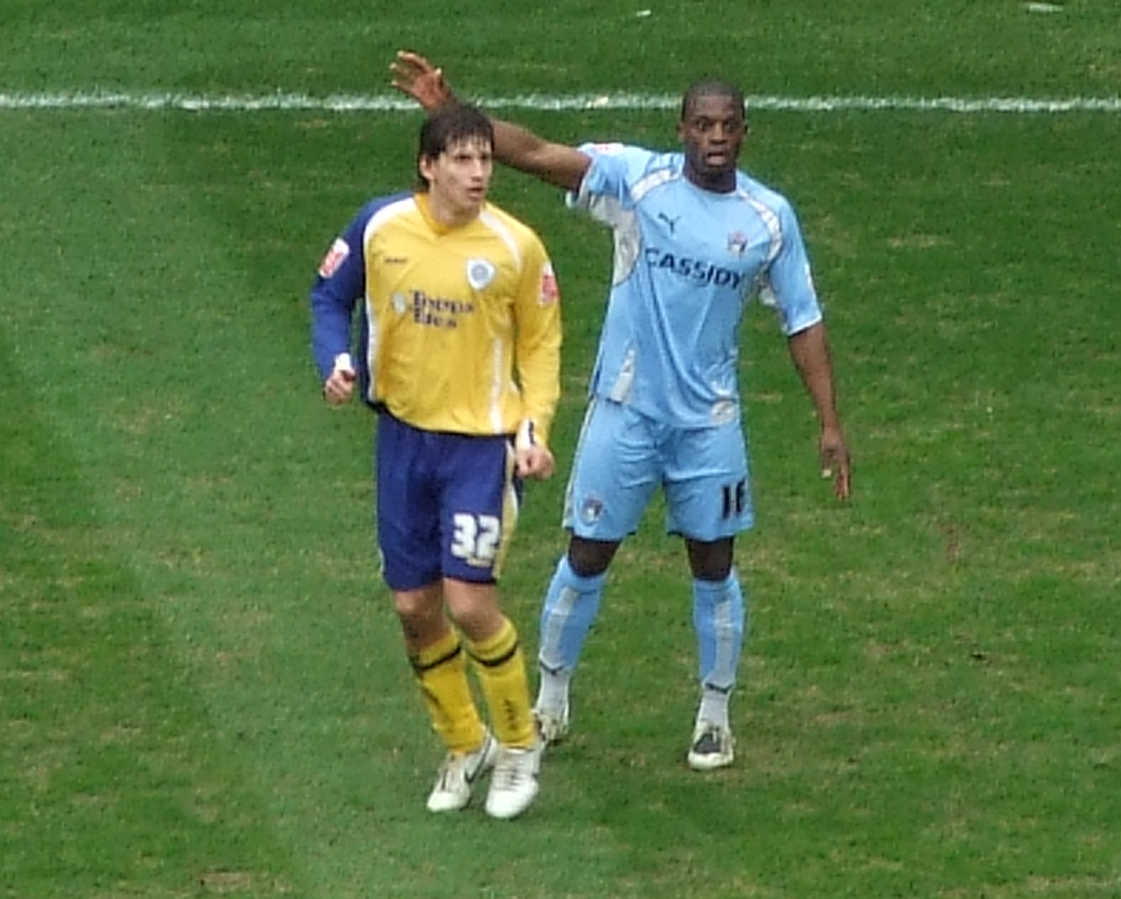
Laczkó playing for Leicester City in February 2008

On 17 December 2007, Laczkó joined Leicester City on trial, and he was signed on loan on 4 January 2008 for the remainder of the season, with the club having the option to buy him for a pre-determined fee. Issued the number 32 shirt, both he and compatriot Gábor Bori (who joined the following week) were keen to earn permanent deals to stay at the club. Laczkó made his debut in a 2–0 win over Coventry City on 12 January, receiving a standing ovation from the home fans when substituted. Then-manager Ian Holloway described him as "absolutely outstanding." Laczkó made his only assist for the club against Norwich City on 16 February, setting up Stephen Clemence's goal in a 4–0 win. He played a total of nine league games as Leicester were relegated at the end of the season; a permanent deal never took place.

=== Vasas ===
Laczkó returned to Hungary after failing to establish himself as a first team player with Olympiacos, signing for Vasas SC for whom he played for one season before joining Hungarian champions Debreceni VSC in August 2009.

=== Debrecen ===
Laczkó played 35 matches and scored 2 goals in the Hungarian squad of Debreceni VSC. He played six matches in the group stages of the 2009–10 Champions League season with Debreceni VSC. He scored a double against arch-rival Diósgyőri VTK in the 2009–10 season. He won the Hungarian National Championship I with Debreceni VSC in 2010. He played and important role in the qualification of the 2010–11 Europa League season in the squad. He scored a goal against Litex in the play-off round. He also performed well against Sampdoria in the Stadio Luigi Ferraris, however Debreceni VSC lost 1–0. In the last round of the 2010–11 Europa League Debreceni VSC beat Sampdoria 2–0.

=== Sampdoria ===
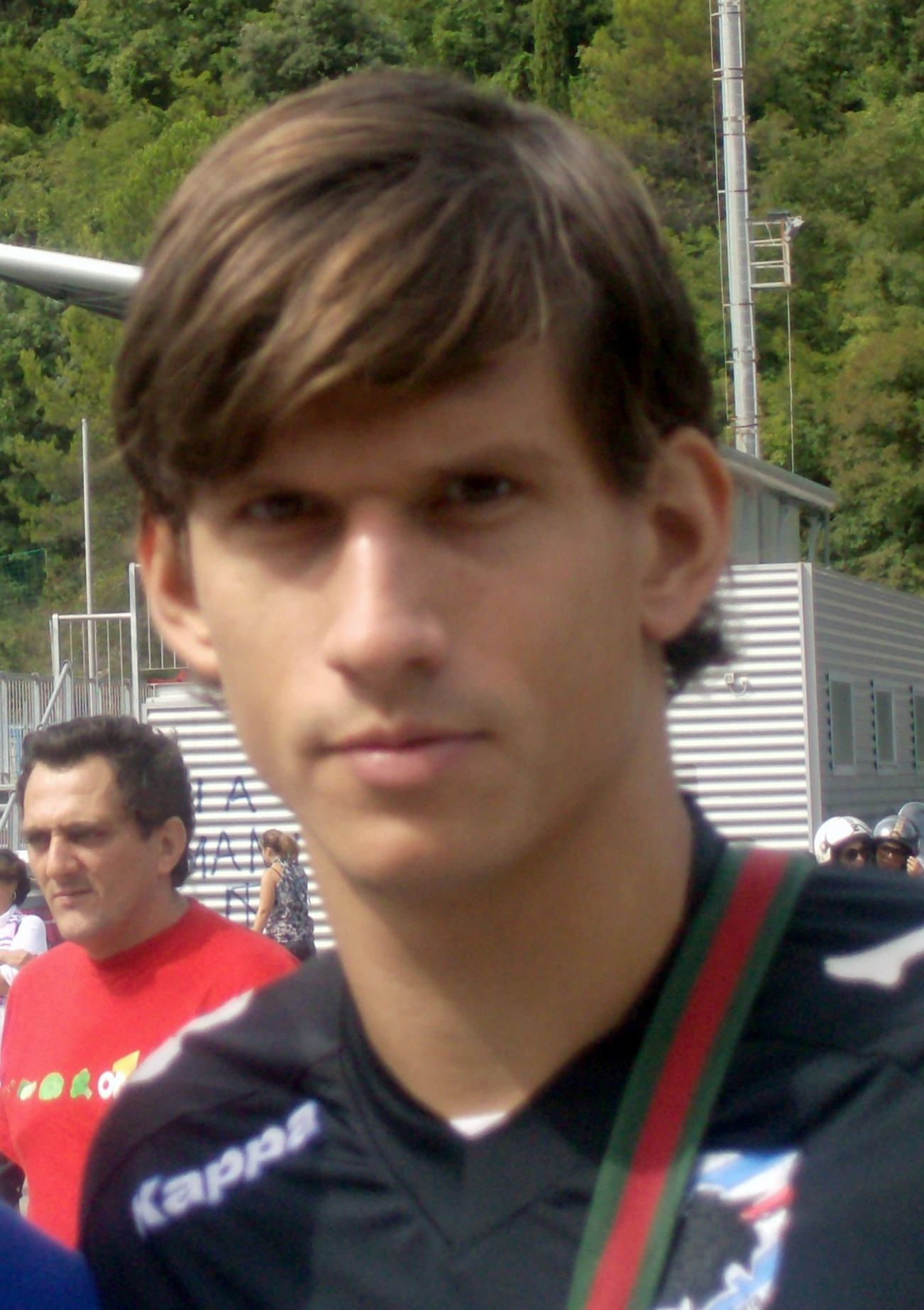
Laczkó at Sampdoria

In January 2011 Zsolt Laczkó signed a contract with Italian Serie A team Sampdoria.

=== Ferencváros ===
On 22 February 2014, Laczkó was signed by the Hungarian League club Ferencvárosi TC.

== International career ==
Laczkó was part of the U21 squad that played in the 2009 UEFA European Under-21 Football Championship qualification, making five appearances as Hungary failed to qualify for the finals. His last appearance for the under-21 was a 1–0 away defeat to Latvia on 18 November 2007. Laczkó made his national team debut as a substitute in a 3–0 friendly defeat to Germany in Budapest on 29 May 2010.

== Career statistics ==
As of 9 December 2017

Club	Season	League		Cup		League Cup		Europe		Total	
Club	Season	Apps	Goals	Apps	Goals	Apps	Goals	Apps	Goals	Apps	Goals
Ferencváros	2004–05	1	0	0	0	0	0	0	0	1	0
Ferencváros	2005–06	27	3	0	0	0	0	0	0	27	3
Ferencváros	2006–07	28	12	5	0	0	0	–	–	33	12
Ferencváros	2013–14	4	0	0	0	2	0	0	0	6	0
Ferencváros	Total	60	15	5	0	2	0	0	0	67	15
Levadiakos (loan)	2007–08	7	0	0	0	–	–	–	–	7	0
Leicester (loan)	2007–08	9	0	0	0	0	0	–	–	9	0
Vasas	2008–09	29	1	0	0	8	3	–	–	37	4
Vasas	2009–10	6	0	0	0	1	0	–	–	7	0
Vasas	Total	35	1	0	0	9	3	0	0	44	4
Debrecen	2009–10	23	1	5	1	1	0	6	0	35	2
Debrecen	2010–11	12	1	1	0	0	0	7	1	20	2
Debrecen	Total	35	2	6	1	1	0	13	1	55	4
Sampdoria	2010–11	9	0	0	0	–	–	–	–	9	0
Sampdoria	2011–12	27	0	1	0	–	–	–	–	28	0
Sampdoria	Total	36	0	1	0	0	0	0	0	37	0
Vicenza (loan)	2012–13	13	0	0	0	–	–	–	–	13	0
Padova (loan)	2013–14	15	0	0	0	–	–	–	–	15	0
Kecskemét	2014–15	15	0	0	0	2	0	–	–	17	0
Békéscsaba
Békéscsaba	2015–16	29	5	6	1	–	–	–	–	35	6
Békéscsaba	Total	29	5	6	1	0	0	0	0	35	6
Paks	2016–17	11	0	1	0	–	–	–	–	12	0
Budapest Honvéd (loan)	2016–17	3	0	1	0	–	–	–	–	4	0
Budapest Honvéd (loan)	2017–18	13	0	3	0	–	–	2	0	18	0
Budapest Honvéd (loan)	Total	16	0	4	0	0	0	2	0	22	0
Career total		281	23	23	2	14	3	15	1	333	29

== Honours ==
Ferencváros

- Hungarian National Championship I: runner-up 2004–05
- Hungarian Cup: runner-up 2004–05

Debrecen

- Hungarian National Championship I: 2009–10
- Hungarian Cup: 2009–10
- Hungarian Super Cup: 2010
- Hungarian League Cup: 2010
