= Dániel Szalai =

Hungarian footballer

Personal information
- Date of birth: 5 September 1996 (age 30)
- Place of birth: Kecskemét, Hungary
- Height: 1.84 m (6 ft 1/2 in)
- Position: Forward

Team information
- Current team: Békéscsaba
- Number: 66

Youth career
- 2008–2014: Kecskemét

Senior career*
Years	Team	Apps	(Gls)
2014–2015	Kecskemét	10	(0)
2015–2020	Békéscsaba	109	(5)
2020–2021	Zalaegerszeg	10	(1)
2021–2022	Budafok	19	(1)
2022–	Békéscsaba	18	(1)
- * Club domestic league appearances and goals as of 20:05, 30 May 2023 (UTC)

Dániel Szalai (born 5 September 1996) is a Hungarian professional footballer who plays for Békéscsaba.

== Club career ==
On 5 June 2021, Szalai signed a contract with Budafok.

On 30 July 2022, Szalai returned to Békéscsaba.

== Career statistics ==
Appearances and goals by club, season and competition
Club	Season	League		Cup		League Cup		Europe		Total	
Club	Season	Apps	Goals	Apps	Goals	Apps	Goals	Apps	Goals	Apps	Goals
Kecskemét
Kecskemét	2013–14	3	0	0	0	1	0	0	0	4	0
Kecskemét	2014–15	0	0	0	0	5	0	0	0	5	0
Kecskemét	Total	3	0	0	0	6	0	0	0	9	0
Career total		3	0	0	0	6	0	0	0	9	0

Updated to games played as of 18 November 2014.
