= Luboš Ilizi =

Slovak footballer

Ľuboš Ilizi
Personal information
- Full name: Ľuboš Ilizi
- Date of birth: 13 October 1982 (age 44)
- Place of birth: Slovakia
- Height: 1.90 m (6 ft 3 in)
- Position: Goalkeeper

Youth career
- FC Nitra
- 1998–2001: FC Spartak Trnava

Senior career*
Years	Team	Apps	(Gls)
2001–2005	FC Spartak Trnava	13	(0)
2002	→ Topoľčany (loan)		
2006	FK Púchov	6	(0)
2006–2011	FC Viktoria Plzeň	7	(0)
2008–2009	→ FK Baník Sokolov (loan)	23	(0)
2011–2012	Vasas SC	29	(0)
2013	Soproni VSE	4	(0)
2015	1. SC Znojmo	14	(0)
2015–	Békéscsaba 1912 Előre SE		
- * Club domestic league appearances and goals as of 27 May 2012

Ľuboš Ilizi (born 13 October 1982) is a professional Slovak footballer.
