= 2017–18 Budapest Honvéd FC season =

Budapest Honvéd FC
2017–18 season
- Chairman: George Hemingway
- Manager: Erik van der Meer (until 9 December 2017); Attila Supka
- NB 1: 4th
- Magyar Kupa: Quarter-final
- UEFA Champions League: Second qualifying round
- Top goalscorer: League: Davide Lanzafame (18); All: Davide Lanzafame (22)
- Highest home attendance: 4,680 v Ferencváros (19 May 2018)
- Lowest home attendance: 1,004 v Siófok (7 March 2018)
| Home colours | Away colours |

The 2017–18 season was Budapest Honvéd FC's 107th competitive season, 13th consecutive season in the OTP Bank Liga and 108th year in existence as a football club.

== First team squad ==
Note: Flags indicate national team as defined under FIFA eligibility rules; some limited exceptions apply. Players may hold more than one non-FIFA nationality.

| No. | Pos. | Nation | Player |
|---|---|---|---|
| 2 | DF | HUN | Dávid Bobál |
| 6 | MF | HUN | Dániel Gazdag |
| 7 | FW | ITA | Davide Lanzafame |
| 8 | DF | NGR | George Ikenne |
| 9 | FW | HUN | Márton Eppel |
| 11 | FW | COD | Kadima Kabangu |
| 13 | DF | HUN | Tibor Heffler |
| 15 | DF | SRB | Stefan Deák |
| 16 | MF | HUN | Zsolt Pölöskei |
| 17 | FW | BRA | Danilo |
| 22 | FW | HUN | Milán Májer |
| 23 | MF | HUN | Bence Banó-Szabó |
| 24 | MF | BIH | Đorđe Kamber |

| No. | Pos. | Nation | Player |
|---|---|---|---|
| 25 | DF | CRO | Ivan Lovrić |
| 33 | DF | CRO | Tonći Kukoč |
| 36 | DF | HUN | Botond Baráth |
| 55 | FW | HUN | Norbert Szendrei |
| 57 | MF | HUN | Filip Holender |
| 61 | DF | SVK | Tomáš Košút |
| 77 | MF | HUN | Gergő Nagy |
| 92 | FW | HUN | Kristóf Herjeczki |
| 93 | MF | HUN | Dávid Stoiacovici |
| 96 | FW | HUN | Dániel Lukács |
| 97 | FW | HUN | Nikolasz Kovács |
| 98 | FW | HUN | Bálint Tömösvári |
| 99 | GK | HUN | Dávid Gróf |

== Transfers ==
=== Summer ===
In: Note: Flags indicate national team as defined under FIFA eligibility rules; some limited exceptions apply. Players may hold more than one non-FIFA nationality.

| No. | Pos. | Nation | Player |
|---|---|---|---|
| 5 | FW | HUN | Gergely Bobál (loan return from Zalaegerszeg) |
| 15 | DF | SRB | Stefan Deák (from Mosonmagyaróvár) |
| 16 | MF | HUN | Zsolt Pölöskei (from Videoton) |
| 17 | FW | BRA | Danilo (from (United Arab Emirates) Dibba Al-Fujairah) |
| 22 | DF | NGR | Akeem Latifu (from (Azerbaijan) Zira) |
| 86 | DF | HUN | Zsolt Laczkó (loan from Paks) |
| 92 | FW | HUN | Kristóf Herjeczki (from Budapest Honvéd youth) |

Out: Note: Flags indicate national team as defined under FIFA eligibility rules; some limited exceptions apply. Players may hold more than one non-FIFA nationality.

| No. | Pos. | Nation | Player |
|---|---|---|---|
| 19 | FW | HUN | Márk Koszta (to Mezőkövesd) |
| 26 | MF | HUN | Patrik Hidi (to (Spain) Real Oviedo) |
| 38 | DF | HUN | Ádám Hajdú (to Paks) |

=== Winter ===
In: Note: Flags indicate national team as defined under FIFA eligibility rules; some limited exceptions apply. Players may hold more than one non-FIFA nationality.

| No. | Pos. | Nation | Player |
|---|---|---|---|
| 13 | DF | HUN | Tibor Heffler (from Cegléd) |
| 33 | DF | CRO | Tonći Kukoč (from (Bosnia and Herzegovina) Zrinjski Mostar) |
| 61 | DF | SVK | Tomáš Košút (from (Poland) Arka Gdynia) |
| — | DF | HUN | Botond Erdélyi (loan return from Kisvárda) |

Out: Note: Flags indicate national team as defined under FIFA eligibility rules; some limited exceptions apply. Players may hold more than one non-FIFA nationality.

| No. | Pos. | Nation | Player |
|---|---|---|---|
| 5 | FW | HUN | Gergely Bobál (to Csákvár) |
| 20 | MF | HUN | Mihály Csábi (to Monor) |
| 22 | DF | NGR | Akeem Latifu (to (Norway) Sogndal) |
| 86 | DF | HUN | Zsolt Laczkó (loan return to Paks) |
| 89 | DF | HUN | Balázs Villám (to Gyirmót) |

== Statistics ==
=== Appearances and goals ===
Last updated on 2 June 2018.

| No. | Pos | Nat | Player | Total | | OTP Bank Liga | | Champions League | | Hungarian Cup | |
| No. | Pos | Nat | Player | Apps | Goals | Apps | Goals | Apps | Goals | Apps | Goals |
|---|---|---|---|---|---|---|---|---|---|---|---|
| 2 | DF | (Hungary) HUN | Dávid Bobál | 25 | 2 | 22 | 2 | 2 | 0 | 1 | 0 |
| 6 | MF | (Hungary) HUN | Dániel Gazdag | 36 | 4 | 27 | 2 | 2 | 0 | 7 | 2 |
| 7 | FW | (Italy) ITA | Davide Lanzafame | 41 | 22 | 32 | 18 | 2 | 2 | 7 | 2 |
| 8 | DF | (Nigeria) NGR | George Ikenne | 13 | 0 | 10 | 0 | 1 | 0 | 2 | 0 |
| 9 | FW | (Hungary) HUN | Márton Eppel | 40 | 17 | 32 | 14 | 2 | 0 | 6 | 3 |
| 11 | FW | (Democratic Republic of the Congo) COD | Kadima Kabangu | 8 | 2 | 7 | 2 | 1 | 0 | 0 | 0 |
| 13 | DF | (Hungary) HUN | Tibor Heffler | 18 | 0 | 14 | 0 | 0 | 0 | 4 | 0 |
| 15 | DF | (Serbia) SRB | Stefan Deák | 7 | 0 | 6 | 0 | 0 | 0 | 1 | 0 |
| 16 | MF | (Hungary) HUN | Zsolt Pölöskei | 19 | 0 | 13 | 0 | 2 | 0 | 4 | 0 |
| 17 | FW | (Brazil) BRA | Danilo | 32 | 7 | 25 | 6 | 1 | 0 | 6 | 1 |
| 22 | FW | (Hungary) HUN | Milán Májer | 8 | 0 | 8 | 0 | 0 | 0 | 0 | 0 |
| 23 | MF | (Hungary) HUN | Bence Banó-Szabó | 29 | 0 | 26 | 0 | 0 | 0 | 3 | 0 |
| 24 | MF | (Bosnia and Herzegovina) BIH | Đorđe Kamber | 35 | 1 | 28 | 1 | 2 | 0 | 5 | 0 |
| 25 | DF | (Croatia) CRO | Ivan Lovrić | 27 | 0 | 20 | 0 | 2 | 0 | 5 | 0 |
| 33 | DF | (Croatia) CRO | Tonći Kukoč | 16 | 0 | 12 | 0 | 0 | 0 | 4 | 0 |
| 36 | DF | (Hungary) HUN | Botond Baráth | 35 | 3 | 27 | 1 | 2 | 1 | 6 | 1 |
| 55 | FW | (Hungary) HUN | Norbert Szendrei | 1 | 0 | 1 | 0 | 0 | 0 | 0 | 0 |
| 57 | MF | (Hungary) HUN | Filip Holender | 30 | 5 | 23 | 4 | 0 | 0 | 7 | 1 |
| 61 | DF | (Slovakia) SVK | Tomáš Košút | 9 | 1 | 7 | 0 | 0 | 0 | 2 | 1 |
| 77 | MF | (Hungary) HUN | Gergő Nagy | 24 | 0 | 19 | 0 | 2 | 0 | 3 | 0 |
| 92 | FW | (Hungary) HUN | Kristóf Herjeczki | 11 | 0 | 9 | 0 | 0 | 0 | 2 | 0 |
| 93 | MF | (Hungary) HUN | Dávid Stoiacovici | 2 | 0 | 1 | 0 | 0 | 0 | 1 | 0 |
| 96 | FW | (Hungary) HUN | Dániel Lukács | 10 | 0 | 7 | 0 | 0 | 0 | 3 | 0 |
| 97 | FW | (Hungary) HUN | Nikolasz Kovács | 1 | 0 | 1 | 0 | 0 | 0 | 0 | 0 |
| 98 | FW | (Hungary) HUN | Bálint Tömösvári | 14 | 0 | 11 | 0 | 1 | 0 | 2 | 0 |
| 99 | GK | (Hungary) HUN | Dávid Gróf | 35 | -58 | 33 | -53 | 2 | -5 | 0 | 0 |
Youth players:
| 18 | GK | (Hungary) HUN | András Horváth | 7 | -7 | 0 | 0 | 0 | 0 | 7 | -7 |
| 19 | FW | (Hungary) HUN | Márk Hegedűs | 1 | 0 | 0 | 0 | 0 | 0 | 1 | 0 |
Players no longer at the club:
| 22 | DF | (Nigeria) NGR | Akeem Latifu | 16 | 0 | 14 | 0 | 0 | 0 | 2 | 0 |
| 86 | DF | (Hungary) HUN | Zsolt Laczkó | 18 | 0 | 13 | 0 | 2 | 0 | 3 | 0 |
| 89 | DF | (Hungary) HUN | Balázs Villám | 4 | 0 | 2 | 0 | 0 | 0 | 2 | 0 |

=== Top scorers ===
Includes all competitive matches. The list is sorted by shirt number when total goals are equal.

Last updated on 2 June 2018

| Position | Nation | Number | Name | OTP Bank Liga | Champions League | Hungarian Cup | Total |
|---|---|---|---|---|---|---|---|
| 1 | (Italy) | 7 | Davide Lanzafame | 18 | 2 | 2 | 22 |
| 2 | (Hungary) | 9 | Márton Eppel | 14 | 0 | 3 | 17 |
| 3 | (Brazil) | 17 | Danilo | 6 | 0 | 1 | 7 |
| 4 | (Hungary) | 57 | Filip Holender | 4 | 0 | 1 | 5 |
| 5 | (Hungary) | 6 | Dániel Gazdag | 2 | 0 | 2 | 4 |
| 6 | (Hungary) | 36 | Botond Baráth | 1 | 1 | 1 | 3 |
| 7 | (Democratic Republic of the Congo) | 11 | Kadima Kabangu | 2 | 0 | 0 | 2 |
| 8 | (Hungary) | 2 | Dávid Bobál | 2 | 0 | 0 | 2 |
| 9 | (Bosnia and Herzegovina) | 24 | Đorđe Kamber | 1 | 0 | 0 | 1 |
| 10 | (Slovakia) | 61 | Tomáš Košút | 0 | 0 | 1 | 1 |
| / | / | / | Own Goals | 0 | 0 | 0 | 0 |
| | | | TOTALS | 50 | 3 | 11 | 64 |

=== Disciplinary record ===
Includes all competitive matches. Players with 1 card or more included only.

Last updated on 2 June 2018

| Position | Nation | Number | Name | OTP Bank Liga | | Champions League | | Hungarian Cup | | Total (Hu Total) | |
| Position | Nation | Number | Name | Yellow card | Red card | Yellow card | Red card | Yellow card | Red card | Yellow card | Red card |
| DF | (Hungary) | 2 | Dávid Bobál | 2 | 1 | 1 | 0 | 1 | 0 | 4 (2) | 1 (1) |
| MF | (Hungary) | 6 | Dániel Gazdag | 5 | 0 | 0 | 0 | 2 | 0 | 7 (5) | 0 (0) |
| FW | (Italy) | 7 | Davide Lanzafame | 9 | 0 | 0 | 0 | 2 | 0 | 11 (9) | 0 (0) |
| DF | (Nigeria) | 8 | George Ikenne | 1 | 0 | 0 | 0 | 1 | 0 | 1 (1) | 0 (0) |
| FW | (Hungary) | 9 | Márton Eppel | 5 | 0 | 0 | 0 | 2 | 0 | 7 (5) | 0 (0) |
| FW | (Democratic Republic of the Congo) | 11 | Kadima Kabangu | 2 | 0 | 0 | 0 | 0 | 0 | 2 (2) | 0 (0) |
| DF | (Hungary) | 13 | Tibor Heffler | 4 | 0 | 0 | 0 | 1 | 0 | 5 (4) | 0 (0) |
| DF | (Serbia) | 15 | Stefan Deák | 1 | 0 | 0 | 0 | 0 | 0 | 1 (1) | 0 (0) |
| MF | (Hungary) | 16 | Zsolt Pölöskei | 1 | 0 | 0 | 0 | 0 | 0 | 1 (1) | 0 (0) |
| FW | (Brazil) | 17 | Danilo | 6 | 0 | 0 | 0 | 1 | 0 | 7 (6) | 0 (0) |
| DF | (Nigeria) | 22 | Akeem Latifu | 1 | 0 | 0 | 0 | 0 | 0 | 1 (1) | 0 (0) |
| MF | (Hungary) | 23 | Bence Banó-Szabó | 2 | 0 | 0 | 0 | 0 | 0 | 2 (2) | 0 (0) |
| MF | (Bosnia and Herzegovina) | 24 | Đorđe Kamber | 3 | 1 | 0 | 0 | 1 | 0 | 4 (3) | 1 (1) |
| DF | (Croatia) | 25 | Ivan Lovrić | 6 | 0 | 1 | 0 | 0 | 0 | 7 (6) | 0 (0) |
| DF | (Croatia) | 33 | Tonći Kukoč | 4 | 0 | 0 | 0 | 1 | 0 | 5 (4) | 0 (0) |
| DF | (Hungary) | 36 | Botond Baráth | 7 | 1 | 1 | 0 | 0 | 1 | 8 (7) | 2 (1) |
| MF | (Hungary) | 57 | Filip Holender | 1 | 0 | 0 | 0 | 0 | 0 | 1 (1) | 0 (0) |
| DF | (Slovakia) | 61 | Tomáš Košút | 2 | 0 | 0 | 0 | 0 | 0 | 2 (2) | 0 (0) |
| MF | (Hungary) | 77 | Gergő Nagy | 3 | 1 | 1 | 0 | 1 | 0 | 5 (3) | 1 (1) |
| DF | (Hungary) | 86 | Zsolt Laczkó | 1 | 0 | 2 | 0 | 1 | 0 | 4 (1) | 0 (0) |
| FW | (Hungary) | 98 | Bálint Tömösvári | 1 | 0 | 1 | 0 | 0 | 0 | 2 (1) | 0 (0) |
| GK | (Hungary) | 99 | Dávid Gróf | 1 | 0 | 0 | 0 | 0 | 0 | 1 (1) | 0 (0) |
| | | | TOTALS | 68 | 4 | 7 | 0 | 13 | 1 | 88 (68) | 5 (4) |

=== Overall ===
| Games played | 42 (33 OTP Bank Liga, 2 Champions League and 7 Hungarian Cup) |
| Games won | 16 (13 OTP Bank Liga, 0 Champions League and 3 Hungarian Cup) |
| Games drawn | 11 (8 OTP Bank Liga, 0 Champions League and 3 Hungarian Cup) |
| Games lost | 15 (12 OTP Bank Liga, 2 Champions League and 1 Hungarian Cup) |
| Goals scored | 64 |
| Goals conceded | 65 |
| Goal difference | −1 |
| Yellow cards | 88 |
| Red cards | 5 |
| Worst discipline | (Hungary) Botond Baráth (8 (yellow card) , 2 (red card) ) |
| Best result | 3–0 (A) v Balmazújváros – OTP Bank Liga – 28-10-2017 |
| Worst result | 1–4 (H) v Vasas OTP Bank Liga – 30-09-2017 |
| Worst result | 2–5 (A) v Ferencváros OTP Bank Liga – 24-02-2018 |
| Most appearances | (Italy) Davide Lanzafame (41 appearances) |
| Top scorer | (Italy) Davide Lanzafame (22 goals) |
| Points | 59/126 (46.83%) |

Last updated: 2 June 2018

== Nemzeti Bajnokság I ==
=== Matches ===
| 15 July 2017 1 | Budapest Honvéd | 2–0 | Szombathelyi Haladás | Budapest, Pest County |
| 20:30 CEST | Bobál 30'; Lanzafame 89' | Report | | Stadium: Bozsik József Stadion; Attendance: 2,090; Referee: (Hungary) József Erdős |

| 22 July 2017 2 | Budapest Honvéd | 2–2 | Diósgyőr | Budapest, Pest County |
| 18:00 CEST | Eppel 61'; Lanzafame 74' | Report | Vela 41' (pen.), 90+5' | Stadium: Bozsik József Stadion; Attendance: 2,605; Referee: (Hungary) Péter Solymosi |

| 29 July 2017 3 | Budapest Honvéd | 2–2 | Balmazújváros | Budapest, Pest County |
| 20:30 CEST | Eppel 52'; Lanzafame 64' | Report | Vayda 3'; Arabuli 69' | Stadium: Bozsik József Stadion; Attendance: 1,753; Referee: (Hungary) Gergely Szőts |

| 5 August 2017 4 | Puskás Akadémia | 0–2 | Budapest Honvéd | Felcsút, Fejér County |
| 20:30 CEST | | Report | Lanzafame 45'; Eppel 60' | Stadium: Pancho Aréna; Attendance: 1,786; Referee: (Hungary) Tamás Bognár |

| 12 August 2017 5 | Budapest Honvéd | 2–1 | Újpest | Budapest, Pest County |
| 18:00 CEST | Lanzafame 73'; Kamber 82' | Report | Zsótér 8' | Stadium: Bozsik József Stadion; Attendance: 3,478; Referee: (Hungary) Ádám Farkas |

| 19 August 2017 6 | Mezőkövesd | 1–2 | Budapest Honvéd | Mezőkövesd, Borsod-Abaúj-Zemplén County |
| 18:00 CEST | Baracskai 72' | Report | Baráth 22'; Kabangu 90+4' | Stadium: Városi Stadion; Attendance: 3,215; Referee: (Hungary) József Erdős |

| 26 August 2017 7 | Budapest Honvéd | 1–3 | Debrecen | Budapest, Pest County |
| 20:30 CEST | Eppel 58' | Report | Tőzsér 27' (pen.); Bódi 62'; Jovanović 90+1' | Stadium: Bozsik József Stadion; Attendance: 2,537; Referee: (Hungary) Zsolt Szabó |

| 10 September 2017 8 | Paks | 2–2 | Budapest Honvéd | Paks, Tolna County |
| 17:00 CEST | Lovrić 80' (o.g.); Papp 90' | Report | Lanzafame 41' (pen.); Kabangu 90+2' | Stadium: Fehérvári úti Stadion; Attendance: 1,200; Referee: (Hungary) Csaba Pintér |

| 16 September 2017 9 | Budapest Honvéd | 1–3 | Ferencváros | Budapest, Pest County |
| 20:30 CEST | Lanzafame 33' (pen.) | Report | Varga 6', 48'; Paintsil 68' | Stadium: Bozsik József Stadion; Attendance: 4,423; Referee: (Hungary) Ádám Farkas |

| 23 September 2017 10 | Videoton | 1–1 | Budapest Honvéd | Felcsút, Fejér County |
| 20:30 CEST | Hadžić 3' | Report | Holender 40' | Stadium: Pancho Aréna; Attendance: 2,449; Referee: (Hungary) Tamás Bognár |

| 30 September 2017 11 | Budapest Honvéd | 1–4 | Vasas | Budapest, Pest County |
| 20:30 CEST | Danilo 76' | Report | Remili 15', 48', 90+3'; Gaál 52' | Stadium: Bozsik József Stadion; Attendance: 2,522; Referee: (Hungary) Viktor Kassai |

| 14 October 2017 12 | Szombathelyi Haladás | 1–2 | Budapest Honvéd | Sopron, Győr-Moson-Sopron County |
| 15:30 CEST | Kiss 57' | Report | Eppel 45' (pen.), 84' | Stadium: Káposztás utcai Stadion; Attendance: 1,740; Referee: (Hungary) Sándor Andó-Szabó |

| 21 October 2017 13 | Diósgyőr | 2–1 | Budapest Honvéd | Debrecen, Hajdú-Bihar County |
| 18:00 CEST | Ugrai 20'; Ioannidis 90+4' (pen.) | Report | Holender 37' | Stadium: Nagyerdei Stadion; Attendance: 4,500; Referee: (Hungary) Zsolt Szabó |

| 28 October 2017 14 | Balmazújváros | 0–3 | Budapest Honvéd | Balmazújváros, Hajdú-Bihar County |
| 15:30 CEST | | Report | Gazdag 34'; Lanzafame 51' (pen.); Eppel 73' | Stadium: Városi Sportpálya; Attendance: 1,239; Referee: (Hungary) István Vad |

| 4 November 2017 15 | Budapest Honvéd | 4–3 | Puskás Akadémia | Budapest, Pest County |
| 19:30 CET | Holender 23'; Lanzafame 58', 87'; Danilo 90+3' | Report | Szakály 52'; Knežević 55', 71' | Stadium: Bozsik József Stadion; Attendance: 2,105; Referee: (Hungary) Csaba Pintér |

| 18 November 2017 16 | Újpest | 2–1 | Budapest Honvéd | Budapest, Pest County |
| 15:30 CET | Tischler 22'; Windecker 61' | Report | Lanzafame 83' | Stadium: Szusza Ferenc Stadion; Attendance: Match without spectators Referee: (Hungary) Tamás Bognár |

| 25 November 2017 17 | Budapest Honvéd | 1–2 | Mezőkövesd | Budapest, Pest County |
| 15:30 CET | Danilo 1' | Report | Novák 10'; Koszta 50' | Stadium: Bozsik József Stadion; Attendance: 1,728; Referee: (Hungary) Zoltán Iványi |

| 2 December 2017 18 | Debrecen | 1–0 | Budapest Honvéd | Debrecen, Hajdú-Bihar County |
| 15:30 CET | Takács 26' | Report | | Stadium: Nagyerdei Stadion; Attendance: 2,521; Referee: (Hungary) Viktor Kassai |

| 9 December 2017 19 | Budapest Honvéd | 1–0 | Paks | Budapest, Pest County |
| 15:30 CET | Gazdag 61' | Report | | Stadium: Bozsik József Stadion; Attendance: 1,330; Referee: (Hungary) Balázs Berke |

| 24 February 2018 20 | Ferencváros | 5–2 | Budapest Honvéd | Budapest, Pest County |
| 19:30 CET | Gorriarán 24'; Böde 33', 83'; Blažič 45'; Leandro 90+1' | Report | Eppel 20', 60' | Stadium: Groupama Arena; Attendance: 7,225; Referee: (Hungary) Zoltán Iványi |

| 11 April 2018 21 | Budapest Honvéd | 1–4 | Videoton | Budapest, Pest County |
| 18:00 CEST | Lanzafame 57' | Report | Nikolov 35'; Lazović 54', 80'; Vinícius 65' | Stadium: Bozsik József Stadion; Attendance: 1,903; Referee: (Hungary) Tamás Bognár |

| 10 March 2018 22 | Vasas | 2–1 | Budapest Honvéd | Budapest, Pest County |
| 17:00 CET | Berecz 10'; Barczi 46' | Report | Eppel 48' | Stadium: Szusza Ferenc Stadion; Attendance: 1,200; Referee: (Hungary) Viktor Kassai |

| 17 March 2018 23 | Budapest Honvéd | 2–1 | Szombathelyi Haladás | Budapest, Pest County |
| 17:00 CET | Bobál 43'; Danilo 90+3' | Report | Jagodics 61' | Stadium: Bozsik József Stadion; Attendance: 1,212; Referee: (Hungary) Zoltán Iványi |

| 31 March 2018 24 | Diósgyőr | 1–1 | Budapest Honvéd | Debrecen, Hajdú-Bihar County |
| 17:00 CEST | Ioannidis 30' (pen.) | Report | Eppel 46' | Stadium: Nagyerdei Stadion; Attendance: 1,723; Referee: (Hungary) József Erdős |

| 7 April 2018 25 | Honvéd | 2–0 | Balmazújváros | Budapest, Pest County |
| 17:00 CEST | Danilo 74'; Lanzafame 90+1' (pen.) | Report | | Stadium: Bozsik József Stadion; Attendance: 1,534; Referee: (Hungary) Viktor Kassai |

| 14 April 2018 26 | Puskás Akadémia | 1–1 | Budapest Honvéd | Felcsút, Fejér County |
| 17:00 CEST | Hegedűs 34' | Report | Danilo 86' | Stadium: Pancho Aréna; Attendance: 1,785; Referee: (Hungary) Gergely Szőts |

| 21 April 2018 27 | Budapest Honvéd | 0–0 | Újpest | Budapest, Pest County |
| 17:00 CEST | | Report | | Stadium: Bozsik József Stadion; Attendance: 2,640; Referee: (Hungary) Ferenc Karakó |

| 28 April 2018 28 | Mezőkövesd | 1–2 | Budapest Honvéd | Mezőkövesd, Borsod-Abaúj-Zemplén County |
| 17:00 CEST | Tóth 21' | Report | Eppel 12'; Lanzafame 25' | Stadium: Városi Stadion; Attendance: 1,756; Referee: (Hungary) Tamás Bognár |

| 5 May 2018 29 | Budapest Honvéd | 1–3 | Debrecen | Budapest, Pest County |
| 17:00 CEST | Eppel 45' | Report | Tabaković 14', 59'; Sós 16' | Stadium: Bozsik József Stadion; Attendance: 2,358; Referee: (Hungary) Viktor Kassai |

| 12 May 2018 30 | Paks | 1–2 | Budapest Honvéd | Paks, Tolna County |
| 17:00 CEST | Szakály 49' | Report | Lanzafame 3' (pen.), 63' | Stadium: Fehérvári úti Stadion; Attendance: 1,135; Referee: (Hungary) Zoltán Iványi |

| 19 May 2018 31 | Budapest Honvéd | 1–1 | Ferencváros | Budapest, Pest County |
| 19:30 CEST | Lanzafame 69' (pen.) | Report | Blažič 49' | Stadium: Bozsik József Stadion; Attendance: 4,680; Referee: (Hungary) Ádám Farkas |

| 27 May 2018 32 | Videoton | 2–0 | Budapest Honvéd | Felcsút, Fejér County |
| 19:30 CEST | Šćepović 27'; Nikolov 79' | Report | | Stadium: Pancho Aréna; Attendance: 3,228; Referee: (Hungary) Sándor Andó-Szabó |

| 2 June 2018 33 | Budapest Honvéd | 3–1 | Vasas | Budapest, Pest County |
| 19:00 CEST | Eppel 54'; Lanzafame 66'; Holender 77' | Report | Gaál 87' | Stadium: Bozsik József Stadion; Attendance: 3,783; Referee: (Hungary) Péter Solymosi |

=== League table ===
| Pos | Team | Pld | W | D | L | GF | GA | GD | Pts | Qualification or relegation |
|---|---|---|---|---|---|---|---|---|---|---|
| 2 | Ferencváros | 33 | 18 | 12 | 3 | 69 | 31 | +38 | 66 | Qualification for the Europa League first qualifying round (Note: Since the winners of the 2017–18 Magyar Kupa, Újpest, qualified for European competition based on league position, the spot awarded to the cup winners (Europa League first qualifying round) was passed to the fourth-placed team.) |
| 3 | Újpest | 33 | 12 | 13 | 8 | 41 | 38 | +3 | 49 | Qualification for the Europa League first qualifying round |
| 4 | Honvéd | 33 | 13 | 8 | 12 | 50 | 53 | −3 | 47 | Qualification for the Europa League first qualifying round |
| 5 | Debrecen | 33 | 12 | 8 | 13 | 53 | 47 | +6 | 44 | |
| 6 | Puskás Akadémia | 33 | 11 | 10 | 12 | 41 | 46 | −5 | 43 | |

Source: Hungarian Football Federation (in Hungarian), Soccerway
Rules for classification: 1) Points; 2) Matches won; 3) Goal difference; 4) Goals scored; 5) Head-to-head points; 6) Head-to-head goal difference; 7) Head-to-head away goals scored; 8) Fair play ranking; 9) Drawing of lots.

=== Results summary ===
| Overall | | | | | | | | Home | | | | | | Away | | | | | |
| Pld | W | D | L | GF | GA | GD | Pts | W | D | L | GF | GA | GD | W | D | L | GF | GA | GD |
|---|---|---|---|---|---|---|---|---|---|---|---|---|---|---|---|---|---|---|---|
| 33 | 13 | 8 | 12 | 50 | 53 | −3 | 47 | 7 | 4 | 6 | 27 | 30 | −3 | 6 | 4 | 6 | 23 | 23 | 0 |

Last updated: 2 June 2018.
Source: NB1

=== Results by round ===
| Round | 1 | 2 | 3 | 4 | 5 | 6 | 7 | 8 | 9 | 10 | 11 | 12 | 13 | 14 | 15 | 16 | 17 | 18 | 19 | 20 | 21 | 22 | 23 | 24 | 25 | 26 | 27 | 28 | 29 | 30 | 31 | 32 | 33 |
|---|---|---|---|---|---|---|---|---|---|---|---|---|---|---|---|---|---|---|---|---|---|---|---|---|---|---|---|---|---|---|---|---|---|
| Ground | H | H | H | A | H | A | H | A | H | A | H | A | A | A | H | A | H | A | H | A | H | A | H | A | H | A | H | A | H | A | H | A | H |
| Result | W | D | D | W | W | W | L | D | L | D | L | W | L | W | W | L | L | L | W | L | L | L | W | D | W | D | D | W | L | W | D | L | W |
| Position | 1 | 2 | 5 | 1 | 1 | 1 | 2 | 2 | 3 | 5 | 6 | 5 | 5 | 4 | 4 | 4 | 4 | 5 | 4 | 5 | 6 | 7 | 6 | 6 | 4 | 5 | 5 | 4 | 6 | 4 | 3 | 5 | 4 |

Updated to match(es) played on 2 June 2018. Source: Matches
A = Away; H = Home; W = Win; D = Draw; L = Loss

== Hungarian Cup ==
| 20 September 2017 Round 6 | Pécs | 0–1 | Budapest Honvéd | Pécs, Baranya County |
| 15:00 CEST | | Report | Holender 20' | Stadium: Stadion PMFC; Attendance: 1,000; Referee: (Hungary) Gábor Barna |

| 25 October 2017 Round 7 | Budaörs | 1–1 (a.e.t.) (4–5 p) | Budapest Honvéd | Tatabánya, Komárom-Esztergom County |
| 18:00 CEST | Sajbán 90+1' | Report | Lanzafame 33' | Stadium: Grosics Gyula Stadion; Referee: (Hungary) Attila Molnár |
| | Penalties |
| | Csobánki (penalty scored); Lengyel (penalty scored); Menyhárt (penalty scored); Sajbán (penalty scored) | | Lanzafame (penalty scored); Lovrić (penalty scored); Baráth (penalty scored); Holender (penalty scored); Pölöskei (penalty scored) |

| 29 November 2017 Round 8 | Gyöngyös | 0–4 | Budapest Honvéd | Gyöngyös, Pest County |
| 15:00 CET | | Report | Eppel 30'; Lanzafame 42'; Gazdag 54'; Danilo 84' | Stadium: Kömlei Károly Sporttelep; Referee: (Hungary) János Takács |

| 21 February 2018 Last 16 (1st leg) | Siófok | 2–2 | Budapest Honvéd | Siófok, Somogy County |
| 18:00 CET | Petneházi 81' (pen.); Gál 90' | Report | Košút 17'; Eppel 26' | Stadium: Révész Géza utcai Stadion; Attendance: 500; Referee: (Hungary) Szabolcs Szilasi |

| 7 March 2018 Last 16 (2nd leg) | Budapest Honvéd | 2–1 (4–3 agg.) | Siófok | Budapest, Pest County |
| 18:00 CET | Gazdag 12'; Baráth 76' | Report | Baráth 72' (o.g.) | Stadium: Bozsik József Stadion; Attendance: 1,004; Referee: (Hungary) János Takács |

| 14 March 2018 Quarter-final (1st leg) | Budapest Honvéd | 0–0 | Debrecen | Budapest, Pest County |
| 16:00 CET | | Report | | Stadium: Bozsik József Stadion; Attendance: 1,178; Referee: (Hungary) Csaba Pintér |

| 3 April 2018 Quarter-final (2nd leg) | Debrecen | 3–1 (3–1 agg.) | Budapest Honvéd | Debrecen, Hajdú-Bihar County |
| 17:30 CET | Könyves 4', 38'; Tabaković 63' | Report | Eppel 68' | Stadium: Nagyerdei Stadion; Attendance: 1,542; Referee: (Hungary) István Vad |

== Champions League ==
The First and Second Qualifying Round draws took place at UEFA headquarters in Nyon, Switzerland on 19 June 2017.

| 12 July 2017 Q2 Leg 1 | Hapoel Be'er Sheva (Israel) | 2–1 | Budapest Honvéd | Be'er Sheva |
| 19:00 CEST | Vitor 35'; Einbinder 52' | Report | Lanzafame 63' | Stadium: Turner Stadium; Attendance: 15,603; Referee: (Sweden) Andreas Ekberg |

| 19 July 2017 Q2 Leg 2 | Budapest Honvéd | 2–3 (3–5 agg.) | (Israel) Hapoel Be'er Sheva | Budapest |
| 21:15 CEST | Lanzafame 45+2' (pen.); Baráth 73' | Report | Ogu 12'; Nwakaeme 16', 84' | Stadium: Bozsik József Stadion; Attendance: 200; Referee: (Italy) Davide Massa |
