= 2019–20 Budapest Honvéd FC season =

Budapest Honvéd FC
2019–20 season
- Chairman: George Hemingway
- Manager: Giuseppe Sannino (until 14 March 2020); István Pisont
- NB 1: 5th
- Magyar Kupa: Winners
- UEFA Europa League: Second qualifying round
- Top goalscorer: League: Davide Lanzafame (11); All: Davide Lanzafame (13)
- Highest home attendance: 3,622 vs Žalgiris Vilnius (11 July 2019)
- Lowest home attendance: 645 vs Fehérvár (9 June 2020)
Home colours	Away colours	Third colours

The 2019–20 season was Budapest Honvéd FC's 109th competitive season, 15th consecutive season in the OTP Bank Liga and 110th year in existence as a football club.

== First team squad ==
As of 25 July 2019

Note: Flags indicate national team as defined under FIFA eligibility rules; some limited exceptions apply. Players may hold more than one non-FIFA nationality.

No.	Pos.	Nation	Player
1	GK	ISR	Robi Levkovich
2	DF	ALG	Mohamed Mezghrani
3	DF	NGR	Eke Uzoma
4	DF	HUN	Dávid Kálnoki-Kis
5	MF	ITA	Federico Moretti
6	MF	HUN	Dániel Gazdag
7	DF	HUN	Bence Batik
11	FW	UKR	Vladyslav Kulach (on loan from Shakhtar)
13	MF	HUN	Tibor Heffler
14	MF	HUN	Nikolasz Kovács
17	MF	TUN	Änis Ben-Hatira
18	GK	HUN	András Horváth
19	FW	HUN	Márk Hegedűs
20	FW	HUN	Dominik Cipf
22	FW	HUN	Milán Májer

No.	Pos.	Nation	Player
23	MF	HUN	Bence Banó-Szabó
24	DF	BIH	Đorđe Kamber (captain)
25	DF	CRO	Ivan Lovrić
26	DF	CMR	Macdonald Ngwa Niba
31	MF	HUN	Barna Kesztyűs (on loan from Paks)
33	DF	CRO	Tonći Kukoč
40	FW	NIG	Amadou Moutari
55	MF	HUN	Norbert Szendrei
60	DF	HUN	Attila Temesvári
66	GK	HUN	Attila Berla
67	MF	HUN	Tamás Egerszegi (on loan from Paks)
77	MF	HUN	Gergő Nagy
88	DF	NGR	George Ikenne (on loan from MTK)
89	FW	FRA	David Ngog

== Transfers ==
=== Summer ===
In: Note: Flags indicate national team as defined under FIFA eligibility rules; some limited exceptions apply. Players may hold more than one non-FIFA nationality.

No.	Pos.	Nation	Player
1	GK	ISR	Robi Levkovich (from (Israel) Hapoel Tel Aviv)
5	MF	ITA	Federico Moretti (from (Italy) Albissola)
9	FW	ITA	Davide Lanzafame (loan from Ferencváros)
11	FW	UKR	Vladyslav Kulach (loan from (Ukraine) Shakhtar Donetsk)
19	FW	HUN	Márk Hegedűs (from Honvéd II)
21	MF	HUN	Krisztián Vadócz (from (Hong Kong) Kitchee)
26	DF	CMR	Macdonald Ngwa Niba (from (Slovakia) Nitra)
30	DF	ALB	Naser Aliji (from (Romania) Dinamo București)
31	MF	HUN	Barna Kesztyűs (loan from Paks)
40	FW	NIG	Amadou Moutari (from Mezőkövesd)
67	MF	HUN	Tamás Egerszegi (loan from Paks)
83	GK	SVK	Tomáš Tujvel (from Fehérvár)
88	DF	NGR	George Ikenne (loan from MTK Budapest)
—	MF	HUN	Dávid Stoiacovici (loan return from Tiszakécske)
—	MF	HUN	Nikolasz Kovács (loan return from Balmazújváros)
—	DF	ROU	Raul Palmes (loan return from Kazincbarcika)
—	FW	HUN	Bálint Tömösvári (loan return from Kaposvár)
—	FW	HUN	Dániel Lukács (loan return from Újpest)

Out: Note: Flags indicate national team as defined under FIFA eligibility rules; some limited exceptions apply. Players may hold more than one non-FIFA nationality.

No.	Pos.	Nation	Player
5	MF	ITA	Federico Moretti
11	MF	HUN	Filip Holender (to (Switzerland) Lugano)
13	DF	HUN	Tibor Heffler
16	MF	HUN	Zsolt Pölöskei (retired)
19	FW	BRA	Danilo (to (Qatar) Muaither)
21	DF	GUI	Fousseni Bamba
22	MF	HUN	Milán Májer (loan to Gyirmót)
26	DF	CRO	Dino Škvorc
29	FW	HUN	Patrik Tischler (loan return to Újpest)
48	MF	GEO	Zakaria Beglarishvili (loan return to (Estonia) Flora)
99	GK	HUN	Dávid Gróf (to Ferencváros)
—	MF	HUN	Dávid Stoiacovici (loan to Ajka)
—	DF	ROU	Raul Palmes (loan to (Romania) Csikszereda)
—	FW	HUN	Bálint Tömösvári (loan to Kaposvár)

=== Winter ===
In: Note: Flags indicate national team as defined under FIFA eligibility rules; some limited exceptions apply. Players may hold more than one non-FIFA nationality.

No.	Pos.	Nation	Player
8	MF	HUN	Patrik Hidi (from (Kazakhstan) Irtysh Pavlodar)
11	FW	CRC	Mayron George (loan from (Denmark) Midtjylland)
19	FW	HUN	Roland Ugrai (from (Greece) Atromitos)
98	FW	HUN	Bálint Tömösvári (loan return from Kaposvár)

Out: Note: Flags indicate national team as defined under FIFA eligibility rules; some limited exceptions apply. Players may hold more than one non-FIFA nationality.

No.	Pos.	Nation	Player
8	MF	HUN	Dániel Lukács (loan to Tiszakécske)
11	FW	UKR	Vladyslav Kulach (loan return to (Ukraine) Shakhtar Donetsk)
14	MF	HUN	Nikolasz Kovács (loan to Tiszakécske)
17	MF	TUN	Änis Ben-Hatira (to (Germany) Karlsruher SC)
19	FW	HUN	Márk Hegedűs (to Kazincbarcika)
21	MF	HUN	Krisztián Vadócz (to (Uruguay) Peñarol)
60	DF	HUN	Attila Temesvári (loan to Tiszakécske)
67	MF	HUN	Tamás Egerszegi (loan return to Paks)
89	FW	FRA	David Ngog (to (Lithuania) Žalgiris)
98	FW	HUN	Bálint Tömösvári (loan to Győr)

== Competitions ==
=== Overview ===
Competition	First match	Last match	Starting round	Final position	Record							
Competition	First match	Last match	Starting round	Final position	Pld	W	D	L	GF	GA	GD	Win %
Nemzeti Bajnokság I	4 August 2019	–	Matchday 1	–	6	1	0	5	8	14	−6	16.67
Magyar Kupa	21 September 2019	–	Sixth round	–	1	1	0	0	7	1	+6	100.00
UEFA Europa League	11 July 2019	1 August 2019	First qualifying round	Second qualifying round	4	1	3	0	4	2	+2	25.00
Total					11	3	3	5	19	17	+2	27.27

Last updated: 23 September 2019
Source: Competitions

=== Nemzeti Bajnokság I ===
==== League table ====
Pos	Team	Pld	W	D	L	GF	GA	GD	Pts	Qualification or relegation
3	Puskás Akadémia	33	14	12	7	52	41	+11	54	Qualification for the Europa League first qualifying round
4	Mezőkövesd	33	14	8	11	42	31	+11	50	
5	Honvéd	33	12	8	13	36	44	−8	44	Qualification for the Europa League first qualifying round (Note: Budapest Honvéd qualified for the Europa League first qualifying round by winning the 2019–20 Magyar Kupa.)
6	Újpest	33	12	7	14	45	45	0	43	
7	Zalaegerszeg	33	11	10	12	51	44	+7	43	

Source: Hungarian Football Federation (in Hungarian), Soccerway
Rules for classification: 1) Points; 2) Matches won; 3) Goal difference; 4) Goals scored; 5) Head-to-head points; 6) Head-to-head goal difference; 7) Head-to-head away goals scored; 8) Fair play ranking; 9) Drawing of lots.

==== Results summary ====
Overall								Home						Away					
Pld	W	D	L	GF	GA	GD	Pts	W	D	L	GF	GA	GD	W	D	L	GF	GA	GD
33	12	8	13	36	44	−8	44	6	4	7	21	26	−5	6	4	6	15	18	−3

Last updated: 27 June 2020.
Source: NB1

==== Results by round ====
Round	1	2	3	4	5	6	7	8	9	10	11	12	13	14	15	16	17	18	19	20	21	22	23	24	25	26	27	28	29	30	31	32	33
Ground	A	A	H	H	A	H	A	H	A	H	A	H	H	A	A	H	A	H	A	H	A	H	H	A	H	H	A	H	A	H	A	H	A
Result	L	L	L	L	W	L	W	D	W	W	W	W	W	L	D	D	D	L	D	W	W	D	L	D	L	W	L	D	W	L	L	W	L
Position	8	12	12	11	10	11	10	10	8	5	5	5	5	5	6	6	5	6	6	5	5	5	6	6	6	6	6	6	6	6	7	5	5

Updated to match(es) played on 27 June 2020. Source: Matches
A = Away; H = Home; W = Win; D = Draw; L = Loss

==== Matches ====
4 August 2019 1	Diósgyőr	2 – 1	Budapest Honvéd	Miskolc
18:00 CEST	Tajti 49' (pen.); Shestakov 75'	Report	Ngog 37' (pen.)	Stadium: Diósgyőri Stadion; Attendance: 6,139; Referee: Tamás Bognár

11 August 2019 2	Paks	3 – 1	Budapest Honvéd	Paks
18:00 CEST	Remili 35'; Hahn 46', 63'	Report	Moutari 76'	Stadium: Fehérvári úti Stadion; Attendance: 2,311; Referee: Ferenc Karakó

17 August 2019 3	Budapest Honvéd	1 – 3	Kisvárda	Budapest
19:30 CEST	Ngog 90'	Report	Ene 9'; Lucas 61'; Grozav 90+3'	Stadium: Hidegkuti Nándor Stadion; Attendance: 2,591; Referee: Csaba Pintér

24 August 2019 4	Budapest Honvéd	2 – 3	Debrecen	Budapest
18:00 CEST	Lanzafame 44', 82'	Report	Trujić 8'; Haris 67'; Varga 77'	Stadium: Hidegkuti Nándor Stadion; Attendance: 2,441; Referee: Ádám Farkas

31 August 2019 5	Újpest	2 – 3	Budapest Honvéd	Budapest
19:30 CEST	Feczesin 4'; Lanzafame 90+1' (o.g.)	Report	Uzoma 10'; Moutari 27'; Gazdag 31'	Stadium: Szusza Ferenc Stadion; Attendance: 3,752; Referee: Zoltán Iványi

14 September 2019 6	Budapest Honvéd	0 – 1	Fehérvár	Budapest
17:00 CEST		Report	Hodžić 82'	Stadium: Hidegkuti Nándor Stadion; Attendance: 3,104; Referee: Viktor Kassai

28 September 2019 7	Mezőkövesd	1 – 2	Budapest Honvéd	Mezőkövesd
17:00 CEST	Sajbán 79'	Report	Banó-Szabó 34'; Ben-Hatira 49'	Stadium: Városi Stadion; Attendance: 2,456; Referee: Gergő Bogár

6 October 2019 8	Budapest Honvéd	0 – 0	Ferencváros	Budapest
16:00 CEST		Report		Stadium: Hidegkuti Nándor Stadion; Attendance: 3,616; Referee: Sándor Andó-Szabó

19 October 2019 9	Zalaegerszeg	0 – 1	Budapest Honvéd	Zalaegerszeg
17:00 CEST		Report	Lanzafame 77'	Stadium: ZTE Arena; Attendance: 4,023; Referee: Zoltán Iványi

26 October 2019 10	Budapest Honvéd	2 – 0	Kaposvár	Budapest
17:00 CEST	Lanzafame 16' (pen.); Moutari 34'	Report		Stadium: Hidegkuti Nándor Stadion; Attendance: 2,543; Referee: József Erdős

2 November 2019 11	Puskás Akadémia	1 – 2	Budapest Honvéd	Felcsút
14:30 CET	Gyurcsó 23'	Report	Lanzafame 6'; Gazdag 72'	Stadium: Pancho Aréna; Attendance: 2,123; Referee: Péter Solymosi

9 November 2019 12	Budapest Honvéd	1 – 0	Diósgyőr	Budapest
19:30 CET	Lanzafame 29'	Report		Stadium: Hidegkuti Nándor Stadion; Attendance: 2,669; Referee: Csaba Pintér

23 November 2019 13	Budapest Honvéd	2 – 1	Paks	Budapest
17:00 CET	Lanzafame 76' (pen.); Aliji 83'	Report	Böde 72'	Stadium: Hidegkuti Nándor Stadion; Attendance: 2,365; Referee: Ádám Pillók

30 November 2019 14	Kisvárda	2 – 0	Budapest Honvéd	Kisvárda
17:00 CET	Gosztonyi 14'; Grozav 81'	Report		Stadium: Várkerti Stadion; Attendance: 2,430; Referee: Ádám Farkas

7 December 2019 15	Debrecen	1 – 1	Budapest Honvéd	Debrecen
17:00 CET	Varga 62'	Report	Batik 46'	Stadium: Nagyerdei Stadion; Attendance: 2,080; Referee: Viktor Kassai

14 December 2019 16	Budapest Honvéd	0 – 0	Újpest	Budapest
19:30 CET		Report		Stadium: Hidegkuti Nándor Stadion; Attendance: 2,937; Referee: Péter Solymosi

25 January 2020 17	Fehérvár	0 – 0	Budapest Honvéd	Székesfehérvár
17:00 CET		Report		Stadium: MOL Aréna Sóstó; Attendance: 3,054; Referee: Balázs Berke

1 February 2020 18	Budapest Honvéd	1 – 2	Mezőkövesd	Budapest
17:00 CET	Moutari 29' (pen.)	Report	Nagy 40'; Beširović 51'	Stadium: Hidegkuti Nándor Stadion; Attendance: 1,973; Referee: Zoltán Iványi

5 February 2020 19	Ferencváros	0 – 0	Budapest Honvéd	Budapest
19:30 CET		Report		Stadium: Groupama Arena; Attendance: 7,227; Referee: Csaba Pintér

8 February 2020 20	Budapest Honvéd	2 – 0	Zalaegerszeg	Budapest
17:00 CET	Kálnoki-Kis 43'; Lanzafame 90+1' (pen.)	Report		Stadium: Hidegkuti Nándor Stadion; Attendance: 2,246; Referee: József Erdős

15 February 2020 21	Kaposvár	0 – 1	Budapest Honvéd	Kaposvár
17:00 CET		Report	Lanzafame 6'	Stadium: Rákóczi Stadion; Attendance: 1,310; Referee: Sándor Andó-Szabó

22 February 2020 22	Budapest Honvéd	1 – 1	Puskás Akadémia	Budapest
17:00 CET	Lanzafame 53' (pen.)	Report	Knežević 88' (pen.)	Stadium: Hidegkuti Nándor Stadion; Attendance: 2,283; Referee: Ferenc Karakó

29 February 2020 23	Budapest Honvéd	0 – 4	Diósgyőr	Budapest
17:00 CET		Report	Hasani 46'; Ivanovski 71'; Molnár 79'; Iszlai 84' (pen.)	Stadium: Hidegkuti Nándor Stadion; Attendance: 2,520; Referee: Gergő Bogár

7 March 2020 24	Paks	0 – 0	Budapest Honvéd	Paks
17:00 CET		Report		Stadium: Fehérvári úti Stadion; Attendance: 1,379; Referee: Péter Solymosi

14 March 2020 25	Budapest Honvéd	1 – 5	Kisvárda	Budapest
17:00 CET	Lanzafame 52' (pen.)	Report	Sassá 43'; Lucas 44'; Rubus 62'; Tsoukalas 77'; Gosztonyi 83'	Stadium: Illovszky Rudolf Stadion; Attendance: x Referee: István Vad

31 May 2020 26	Budapest Honvéd	3 – 1	Debrecen	Budapest
18:55 CEST	Kamber 15'; Ugrai 51' (pen.); Szemerédi 89'	Report	Adeniji 67'	Stadium: Hidegkuti Nándor Stadion; Attendance: 700; Referee: Csaba Pintér

6 June 2020 27	Újpest	1 – 0	Budapest Honvéd	Budapest
21:05 CEST	Novothny 46'	Report		Stadium: Szusza Ferenc Stadion; Attendance: 1,900; Referee: Ádám Pillók

9 June 2020 28	Budapest Honvéd	1 – 1	Fehérvár	Budapest
21:05 CEST	Ugrai 63'	Report	Nikolić 4'	Stadium: Hidegkuti Nándor Stadion; Attendance: 645; Referee: Bence Csonka

12 June 2020 29	Mezőkövesd	1 – 2	Budapest Honvéd	Mezőkövesd
20:00 CEST	Dragóner 90+2'	Report	Ugrai 11'; Gazdag 38'	Stadium: Városi Stadion; Attendance: 978; Referee: István Vad

16 June 2020 30	Budapest Honvéd	0 – 2	Ferencváros	Budapest
21:05 CEST		Report	Blažič 48'; Škvarka 53'	Stadium: Hidegkuti Nándor Stadion; Attendance: 876; Referee: Sándor Andó-Szabó

19 June 2020 31	Zalaegerszeg	2 – 0	Budapest Honvéd	Zalaegerszeg
20:00 CEST	Batik 51' (o.g.); Babati 90+2'	Report		Stadium: ZTE Arena; Attendance: 4,745; Referee: Csaba Pintér

24 June 2020 32	Budapest Honvéd	4 – 2	Kaposvár	Budapest
19:00 CEST	Gazdag 20', 65'; Hidi 62'; Kukoč 90+4'	Report	Bévárdi 58'; Balázs 83'	Stadium: Hidegkuti Nándor Stadion; Attendance: 1,982; Referee: Péter Antal

27 June 2020 33	Puskás Akadémia	2 – 1	Budapest Honvéd	Felcsút
20:00 CEST	Nagy 35'; Slagveer 84'	Report	George 23'	Stadium: Pancho Aréna; Attendance: 1,918; Referee: Zoltán Iványi

=== Hungarian Cup ===
21 September 2019 6th round	Dunaharaszti	1 – 7	Budapest Honvéd	Dunaharaszti
15:00 CEST	Mendebaba 57'	Report	Batik 4'; Cipf 13'; Kukoč 21'; Banó-Szabó 34'; Kálnoki-Kis 43'; Kulach 76', 93+3'	Stadium: DMTK Stadium; Attendance: 900; Referee: Dávid Juhász

30 October 2019 7th round	Kazincbarcika	0 – 2 (a.e.t.)	Budapest Honvéd	Kazincbarcika
12:30 CET		Report	Batik 109'; Lanzafame 118'	Stadium: Pete András Stadion; Attendance: 600; Referee: János Takács

4 December 2019 8th round	Monor	1 – 3	Budapest Honvéd	Monor
12:00 CET	Barthel 84'	Report	Moutari 22'; Lanzafame 51'; Vadócz 69'	Stadium: Balassi Bálint utcai Stadion; Attendance: 600; Referee: László Lovas

12 February 2020 Round of 16 (1st leg)	Budapest Honvéd	1 – 0	Szombathely	Budapest
19:30 CET	Kukoč 57'	Report		Stadium: Illovszky Rudolf Stadion; Attendance: 1,809; Referee: Mihály Káprály

19 February 2020 Round of 16 (2nd leg)	Szombathely	2 – 1 (a) (a.e.t.) (2 – 2 agg.)	Budapest Honvéd	Szombathely
18:00 CET	Jancsó 31'; B. Tóth 93'	Report	Lovrić 100'	Stadium: Haladás Sportkomplexum; Attendance: 1,776; Referee: Balázs Berke

4 March 2020 Quarter-final (1st leg)	Paks	0 – 0	Budapest Honvéd	Paks
18:00 CET		Report		Stadium: Fehérvári úti Stadion; Attendance: 1,031; Referee: Zoltán Iványi

11 March 2020 Quarter-final (2nd leg)	Budapest Honvéd	2 – 0 (2 – 0 agg.)	Paks	Szeged
18:00 CET	Gazdag 45'; Kamber 78'	Report		Stadium: Szent Gellért Fórum; Attendance: 880; Referee: Ferenc Karakó

23 May 2020 Semi-final (1st leg)	MTK Budapest	0 – 0	Budapest Honvéd	Budapest
20:05 CEST		Report		Stadium: Hidegkuti Nándor Stadion; Attendance: no spectators Referee: József Erdős

26 May 2020 Semi-final (2nd leg)	Budapest Honvéd	0 – 0 (a.e.t.) (0 – 0 agg.) (5 – 4 p)	MTK Budapest	Budapest
18:00 CEST		Report		Stadium: Puskás Aréna; Attendance: no spectators Referee: Péter Solymosi
	Penalties
	Lovrić (penalty scored); Szendrei (penalty scored); Moutari (penalty scored); Uzoma (penalty missed); Kukoč (penalty scored); Hidi (penalty scored)		(penalty missed) Kanta; (penalty scored) Pintér; (penalty scored) Prosser; (penalty scored) Bognár; (penalty scored) Cseke; (penalty missed) Gera

3 June 2020 Final	Budapest Honvéd	2 – 1	Mezőkövesd	Budapest
20:00 CEST	Kamber 33', 56'	Report	Pekár 37'	Stadium: Puskás Aréna; Attendance: 10,000; Referee: Tamás Bognár

=== UEFA Europa League ===
==== First qualifying round ====
11 July 2019 Q1 Leg 1	Budapest Honvéd	3 – 1	(Lithuania) Žalgiris	Budapest
21:00 CEST	Banó-Szabó 32'; Ngog 55'; Gazdag 69' (pen.)	Report	Uzėla 90+2'	Stadium: Illovszky Rudolf Stadion; Attendance: 3,622; Referee: (Slovakia) Boris Marhefka

18 July 2019 Q1 Leg 2	Žalgiris (Lithuania)	1 – 1 (2 – 4 agg.)	Budapest Honvéd	Vilnius, Lithuania
19:00 CEST	Antal 18'	Report	Kamber 62'	Stadium: LFF Stadium; Attendance: 3,725; Referee: (Norway) Rohit Saggi

==== Second qualifying round ====
25 July 2019 Q2 Leg 1	Budapest Honvéd	0 – 0	(Romania) Universitatea Craiova	Győr
18:55 CEST		Report		Stadium: ETO Park; Attendance: 2,720; Referee: (Scotland) Kevin Clancy

1 August 2019 Q2 Leg 2	Universitatea Craiova (Romania)	0 – 0 (a.e.t.) (0 – 0 agg.) (3–1 p)	Budapest Honvéd	Craiova, Romania
18:15 CEST		Report		Stadium: Stadionul Ion Oblemenco; Attendance: 22,134; Referee: (Northern Ireland) Arnold Hunter
	Penalties
	Ioniță (penalty scored); Fortes (penalty scored); Cicâldău (penalty scored)		(penalty missed) Kamber; (penalty missed) Batik; (penalty scored) Ngog; (penalty missed) Banó-Szabó

== Statistics ==
=== Appearances and goals ===
Last updated on 27 June 2020.

No.	Pos	Nat	Player	Total		OTP Bank Liga		Hungarian Cup		Europa League	
No.	Pos	Nat	Player	Apps	Goals	Apps	Goals	Apps	Goals	Apps	Goals
1	GK	(Israel) ISR	Robi Levkovich	9	-7	4	-5	1	0	4	-2
2	DF	(Algeria) ALG	Mohamed Mezghrani	16	0	11	0	5	0	0	0
3	DF	(Nigeria) NGR	Eke Uzoma	38	1	27	1	7	0	4	0
4	DF	(Hungary) HUN	Dávid Kálnoki-Kis	14	2	8	1	4	1	2	0
6	MF	(Hungary) HUN	Dániel Gazdag	35	7	24	5	8	1	3	1
7	DF	(Hungary) HUN	Bence Batik	42	3	30	1	8	2	4	0
8	MF	(Hungary) HUN	Patrik Hidi	20	1	15	1	5	0	0	0
9	FW	(Italy) ITA	Davide Lanzafame	30	13	23	11	7	2	0	0
11	FW	(Costa Rica) CRC	Mayron George	11	1	6	1	5	0	0	0
18	GK	(Hungary) HUN	András Horváth	3	-6	2	-6	1	0	0	0
19	FW	(Hungary) HUN	Roland Ugrai	18	3	13	3	5	0	0	0
20	FW	(Hungary) HUN	Dominik Cipf	17	1	14	0	1	1	2	0
23	MF	(Hungary) HUN	Bence Banó-Szabó	27	3	18	1	5	1	4	1
24	MF	(Bosnia and Herzegovina) BIH	Đorđe Kamber	44	5	32	1	8	3	4	1
25	DF	(Croatia) CRO	Ivan Lovrić	39	1	29	0	6	1	4	0
26	DF	(Cameroon) CMR	Macdonald Ngwa Niba	16	0	8	0	6	0	2	0
27	MF	(Hungary) HUN	Norbert Szendrei	10	1	8	1	2	0	0	0
30	DF	(Albania) ALB	Naser Aliji	25	1	21	1	4	0	0	0
31	DF	(Hungary) HUN	Barna Kesztyűs	40	0	29	0	8	0	3	0
33	DF	(Croatia) CRO	Tonći Kukoč	27	3	14	1	9	2	4	0
40	FW	(Niger) NIG	Amadou Moutari	42	5	30	4	8	1	4	0
66	GK	(Hungary) HUN	Attila Berla	3	-5	2	-5	0	0	1	0
77	MF	(Hungary) HUN	Gergő Nagy	35	0	25	0	10	0	0	0
82	FW	(Hungary) HUN	Dávid László	6	0	4	0	2	0	0	0
83	GK	(Slovakia) SVK	Tomáš Tujvel	34	-33	26	-28	8	-5	0	0
85	MF	(Hungary) HUN	Gergő Irimiás	4	0	4	0	0	0	0	0
87	DF	(Hungary) HUN	Gábor Buna	2	0	1	0	1	0	0	0
88	DF	(Nigeria) NGR	George Ikenne	18	0	13	0	4	0	1	0
92	MF	(Hungary) HUN	Péter Tóth	1	0	1	0	0	0	0	0
Out to loan:
8	FW	(Hungary) HUN	Dániel Lukács	0	0	0	0	0	0	0	0
14	MF	(Hungary) HUN	Nikolasz Kovács	4	0	1	0	2	0	1	0
22	MF	(Hungary) HUN	Milán Májer	0	0	0	0	0	0	0	0
76	GK	(Hungary) HUN	Gábor Megyeri	0	0	0	0	0	0	0	0
Players no longer at the club:
5	MF	(Italy) ITA	Federico Moretti	2	0	1	0	0	0	1	0
11	FW	(Ukraine) UKR	Vladyslav Kulach	7	2	3	0	1	2	3	0
13	DF	(Hungary) HUN	Tibor Heffler	1	0	0	0	0	0	1	0
17	MF	(Tunisia) TUN	Änis Ben-Hatira	10	1	8	1	2	0	0	0
19	FW	(Hungary) HUN	Márk Hegedűs	1	0	0	0	0	0	1	0
21	MF	(Hungary) HUN	Krisztián Vadócz	14	1	11	0	3	1	0	0
67	MF	(Hungary) HUN	Tamás Egerszegi	1	0	1	0	0	0	0	0
89	FW	(France) FRA	David Ngog	10	3	5	2	1	0	4	1

=== Top scorers ===
Includes all competitive matches. The list is sorted by shirt number when total goals are equal.

Last updated on 27 June 2020

Position	Nation	Number	Name	OTP Bank Liga	UEFA Europa League	Hungarian Cup	Total
1	(Italy)	9	Davide Lanzafame	11	0	2	13
2	(Hungary)	6	Dániel Gazdag	5	1	1	7
3	(Nigeria)	40	Amadou Moutari	4	0	1	5
4	(Bosnia and Herzegovina)	24	Đorđe Kamber	1	1	3	5
5	(France)	89	David Ngog	2	1	0	3
6	(Hungary)	23	Bence Banó-Szabó	1	1	1	3
7	(Hungary)	19	Roland Ugrai	3	0	0	3
8	(Hungary)	7	Bence Batik	1	0	2	3
9	(Croatia)	33	Tonći Kukoč	1	0	2	3
10	(Hungary)	4	Dávid Kálnoki-Kis	1	0	1	2
11	(Ukraine)	11	Vladyslav Kulach	0	0	2	2
12	(Tunisia)	17	Änis Ben-Hatira	1	0	0	1
13	(Nigeria)	3	Eke Uzoma	1	0	0	1
14	(Albania)	30	Naser Aliji	1	0	0	1
15	(Hungary)	27	Norbert Szendrei	1	0	0	1
16	(Hungary)	8	Patrik Hidi	1	0	0	1
18	(Costa Rica)	11	Mayron George	1	0	0	1
18	(Hungary)	20	Dominik Cipf	0	0	1	1
19	(Hungary)	21	Krisztián Vadócz	0	0	1	1
20	(Croatia)	25	Ivan Lovrić	0	0	1	1
/	/	/	Own goals	0	0	0	0
			TOTALS	36	5	17	58

=== Disciplinary record ===
Includes all competitive matches. Players with 1 card or more included only.

Last updated on 27 June 2020

Position	Nation	Number	Name	OTP Bank Liga		UEFA Europa League		Hungarian Cup		Total (Hu Total)	
Position	Nation	Number	Name	Yellow card	Red card	Yellow card	Red card	Yellow card	Red card	Yellow card	Red card
GK	(Israel)	1	Robi Levkovich	1	0	0	0	0	0	1 (1)	0 (0)
DF	(Algeria)	2	Mohamed Mezghrani	2	1	0	0	3	0	5 (2)	1 (1)
DF	(Nigeria)	3	Eke Uzoma	6	0	0	0	0	0	6 (6)	0 (0)
DF	(Hungary)	4	Dávid Kálnoki-Kis	2	0	1	0	1	1	4 (2)	1 (0)
MF	(Italy)	5	Federico Moretti	0	0	1	0	0	0	1 (0)	0 (0)
MF	(Hungary)	6	Dániel Gazdag	2	0	3	0	2	0	7 (2)	0 (0)
MF	(Hungary)	7	Bence Batik	4	2	1	0	0	0	5 (4)	2 (2)
MF	(Hungary)	8	Patrik Hidi	2	0	0	0	0	0	2 (2)	0 (0)
FW	(Italy)	9	Davide Lanzafame	7	0	0	0	0	0	7 (7)	0 (0)
FW	(Costa Rica)	11	Myron George	0	0	0	0	1	0	1 (0)	0 (0)
FW	(Tunisia)	17	Änis Ben-Hatira	2	0	0	0	0	0	2 (2)	0 (0)
FW	(Hungary)	19	Roland Ugrai	2	0	0	0	1	0	3 (2)	0 (0)
FW	(Hungary)	20	Dominik Cipf	1	0	0	0	0	0	1 (1)	0 (0)
MF	(Hungary)	23	Bence Banó-Szabó	5	0	1	0	0	0	6 (5)	0 (0)
MF	(Bosnia and Herzegovina)	24	Đorđe Kamber	3	1	1	0	3	0	7 (3)	1 (1)
DF	(Croatia)	25	Ivan Lovrić	8	0	1	0	3	0	12 (8)	0 (0)
DF	(Cameroon)	26	Macdonald Ngwa Niba	2	0	0	0	0	0	2 (2)	0 (0)
MF	(Hungary)	27	Norbert Szendrei	1	0	0	0	1	0	2 (1)	0 (0)
DF	(Albania)	30	Naser Aliji	3	1	0	0	0	0	3 (3)	1 (1)
DF	(Hungary)	31	Barna Kesztyűs	3	0	0	0	1	0	4 (3)	0 (0)
DF	(Croatia)	33	Tonći Kukoč	5	0	3	0	2	0	10 (5)	0 (0)
FW	(Niger)	40	Amadou Moutari	1	0	2	0	1	0	4 (1)	0 (0)
MF	(Hungary)	77	Gergő Nagy	3	0	0	0	1	0	4 (3)	0 (0)
FW	(Hungary)	82	Dávid László	1	0	0	0	0	0	1 (1)	0 (0)
GK	(Slovakia)	83	Tomáš Tujvel	3	0	0	0	0	0	3 (3)	0 (0)
MF	(Hungary)	85	Gergő Irimiás	1	0	0	0	0	0	1 (1)	0 (0)
DF	(Nigeria)	88	George Ikenne	4	0	0	0	1	0	5 (4)	0 (0)
			TOTALS	74	5	15	0	21	1	110 (74)	6 (5)

=== Overall ===
Games played	47 (33 OTP Bank Liga, 4 UEFA Europa League and 10 Hungarian Cup)
Games won	19 (12 OTP Bank Liga, 1 UEFA Europa League and 6 Hungarian Cup)
Games drawn	14 (8 OTP Bank Liga, 3 UEFA Europa League and 3 Hungarian Cup)
Games lost	14 (13 OTP Bank Liga, 0 UEFA Europa League and 1 Hungarian Cup)
Goals scored	58
Goals conceded	51
Goal difference	+7
Yellow cards	110
Red cards	6
Worst discipline	(Croatia) Ivan Lović (12 (yellow card) , 0 (red card) )
Best result	7–1 (A) v Dunaharaszti - Hungarian Cup - 21-9-2019
Worst result	0–4 (H) v Diósgyőr - Nemzeti Bajnokság I - 29-2-2020
Worst result	1–5 (H) v Kisvárda - Nemzeti Bajnokság I - 14-3-2020
Most appearances	(Bosnia and Herzegovina) Đorđe Kamber (44 appearances)
Top scorer	(Italy) Davide Lanzafame (13 goals)
Points	71/141 (50.35%)

Last updated: 27 June 2020
