= Dániel Gazdag =

Hungarian footballer (born 1996)

- Gazdag with the New England Revolution in 2026

Personal information
- Full name: Dániel Gazdag
- Date of birth: 2 March 1996 (age 30)
- Place of birth: Nyíregyháza, Hungary
- Height: 1.78 m (5 ft 10 in)
- Positions: Attacking midfielder; forward

Team information
- Current team: New England Revolution
- Number: 16

Youth career
- 2004–2010: Nyíregyháza
- 2010–2014: Budapest Honvéd

Senior career*
Years	Team	Apps	(Gls)
2013–2016	Budapest Honvéd II	26	(1)
2013–2021	Budapest Honvéd	175	(21)
2021–2025	Philadelphia Union	125	(59)
2025–2026	Columbus Crew	43	(7)
2026–	New England Revolution	2	(1)

International career^{‡}
2012–2013	Hungary U17	3	(1)
2013–2014	Hungary U18	9	(0)
2015	Hungary U20	1	(0)
2017–2018	Hungary U21	9	(0)
2019–	Hungary	30	(4)
- * Club domestic league appearances and goals as of 19:47, 30 August 2026 (UTC) ‡ National team caps and goals as of 11:30, 15 June 2025 (UTC)

Dániel Gazdag (Hungarian: [ˈɡɒzdɒɡ ˈdaːnijɛl], born 2 March 1996) is a Hungarian professional footballer who plays as an attacking midfielder or forward for Major League Soccer club New England Revolution and the Hungary national team

== Club career ==
=== Budapest Honvéd ===
Gazdag scored on his debut with Budapest Honvéd in the Hungarian Cup on 23 September 2014 against third-tier BKV Előre. Three days later, he made his league debut in the Hungarian top flight, coming on as a substitute in the 77th minute for Cristian Portilla. In June 2015, he extended his contract with Honvéd until 2019. During the 2016–17 season, Gazdag became a regular for the team that won the Nemzeti Bajnokság I. He scored his first goal in the league in his 77th game, a 30-yard strike on 28 October 2017, a goal which won the league's goal of the year award. In 2019, he extended with Honvéd through 2022. He suffered an injury to his shoulder in late November which kept him sidelined until mid-February 2020. In a first round Hungarian Cup matchup on 20 September 2020, Gazdag scored four goals and assisted two more as his team beat FC Tiszaújváros 7–1. On 3 April 2021, Gazdag scored two goals within 46 seconds in a 2–2 league draw against Újpest. At the conclusion of the season, Gazdag was recognized as the league's best player and was also credited with scoring the goal of the season.

=== Philadelphia Union ===
==== 2021 ====
After delaying his transfer until Honvéd was mathematically safe from relegation, Gazdag was announced as a signing by the Philadelphia Union of Major League Soccer on 11 May 2021, for a reported $1.8 million (€1.5 million), and his two-year contract included a club option for a third and fourth year. After visa issues held up his debut, he appeared for his new club as a substitute in a 1–0 victory at D.C. United. He then departed for his national team for UEFA Euro 2020, where he was injured at a pre-tournament training camp. He returned to play for the Union on 26 June as a second-half substitute. He converted a penalty kick to score his first goal for his new club on 4 August. On 20 October, Gazdag scored two goals in a 3–2 loss to Minnesota United FC.

==== 2022 ====
During the 2022 season, one which Gazdag stated was "the best season in my career", he played as the number ten in a 4–4–2 diamond. On 22 May, he scored a goal via a bicycle kick against the Portland Timbers. He recorded goal-scoring streaks in four consecutive matches on two occasions, and a five-match scoring streak once. Included in that five-match streak was a hat-trick in the Union's match against the Colorado Rapids on 27 August. He scored his second hat-trick of the season in a match on the last game of the regular season against Toronto FC. He started all 38 matches across all competitions, scoring 24 goals, including one in the 2022 MLS Cup final, which his team ultimately lost. At the conclusion of the season, Gazdag was named to the MLS Best XI.

==== 2023 ====
During the 2023 offseason, Gazdag signed a contract extension with the Union. On the first match of the 2023 season, Gazdag scored a brace in a 4–1 victory against the Columbus Crew, with both goals coming via penalty kick. He notched two more braces throughout the season, one against the New England Revolution on 20 May, and one against Nashville SC on 12 July. During the 2023 Leagues Cup, Gazdag scored in the first match versus Club Tijuana, and scored a hat-trick against Querétaro the following match. After the Union's third-place finish in the Leagues Cup tournament, Gazdag scored in the first match following the resumption of league play against D.C. United on 26 August. On 4 October, Gazdag scored a goal via a bicycle kick and assisted once in a 3–2 win against Atlanta United.

==== 2024 ====
On 30 April 2024, he became the club's all-time leading goal scorer with his 57th goal across all competitions. He scored a hat trick on 20 July in a win at home against Nashville SC.

=== Columbus Crew ===
==== 2025 ====
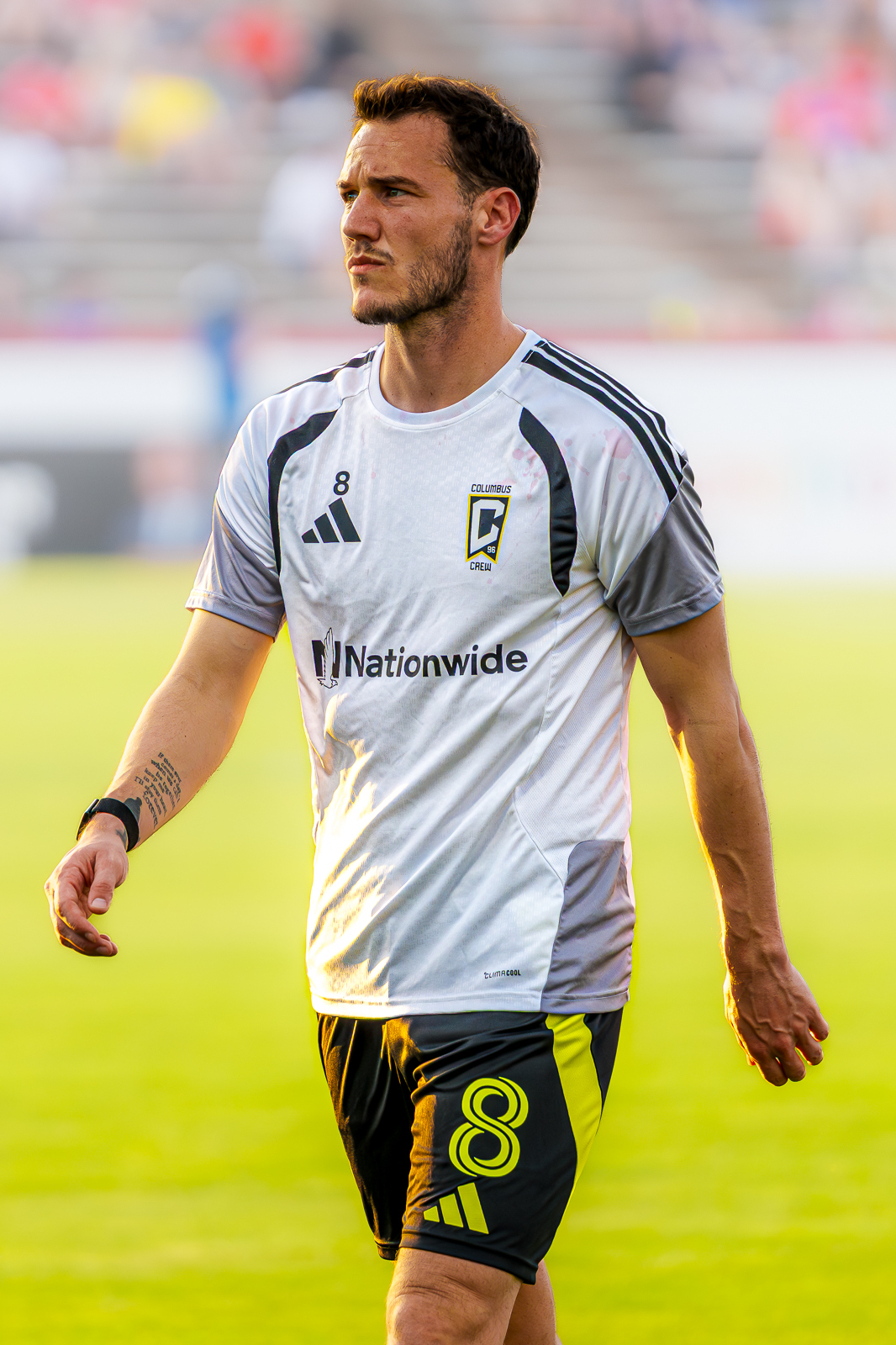
Gazdag with the Columbus Crew in 2026

After the Union declined to offer him a contract extension, Gazdag was transferred midseason to the Columbus Crew for $4 million on 11 April 2025, and a new contract was announced on 7 May through the 2027 season with a club option for the 2028 season. Playing in a different role for his new club, where he was asked to "be more involved with the ball and the buildup", Gazdag had a difficult start in Columbus, as he registered no goal contributions in his first nine games with the Crew. He picked up his first assist with the Black and Gold in a 2–1 win at home against the Vancouver Whitecaps on 14 June, his tenth game for the club. He netted his first goal for the club a month later on 19 July via a penalty kick against D.C. United. On 13 September, he assisted twice in a 5–4 win away at Atlanta United. Gazdag lost his starting spot at the end of the season, coming off the bench for the last two regular season games, as well as all three playoff games. In his first season with his new club, he registered four goals and three assists in 32 matches across all competitions.

=== New England Revolution ===
On 1 September 2026 the New England Revolution of Major League Soccer announced that they had acquired Gazdag on a contract running through December 2027, with additional club options through the 2028-29 MLS season. He scored his first goal for the club on 9 September, a 93rd minute game-winner over NYCFC.

== International career ==
Gazdag made his debut for the Hungary national team on 5 September 2019 in a friendly against Montenegro, as a starter.

He scored his first national team goal on 31 March 2021 against Andorra, via a header. It was a goal that Gazdag called "almost cathartic, it’s a big thing to score for the national team.”

On 1 June 2021, Gazdag was included in the final 26-man squad to represent Hungary at the rescheduled UEFA Euro 2020 tournament. He withdrew from the squad on 16 June due to injury without making an appearance.

On 14 June 2022, Gazdag scored Hungary's fourth goal as they beat England 4–0 in the UEFA Nations League.

On 14 May 2024, Gazdag was named in Hungary's squad for UEFA Euro 2024. He made one appearance at the tournament, coming on as an 87th-minute substitute for Barnabás Varga in a 2–0 loss to Germany.

== Style of play ==
Dániel Gazdag has been praised for his high soccer intelligence, strong work rate both on and off the ball, and movement inside of the opponent's box.

== Career statistics ==
=== Club ===
As of match played 7 August 2026

Appearances and goals by club, season and competition
Club	Season	League			National cup		League cup		Other		Total	
Club	Season	Division	Apps	Goals	Apps	Goals	Apps	Goals	Apps	Goals	Apps	Goals
Honvéd II	2013–14	Nemzeti Bajnokság III	7	0	–		–		–		7	0
Honvéd II	2014–15	Nemzeti Bajnokság III	9	1	–		–		–		9	1
Honvéd II	2015–16	Nemzeti Bajnokság III	10	0	–		–		–		10	0
Honvéd II	Total		26	1	0	0	0	0	0	0	26	1
Honvéd	2014–15	Nemzeti Bajnokság I	12	0	1	1	—		—		13	1
Honvéd	2015–16	Nemzeti Bajnokság I	24	0	1	0	–		–		25	0
Honvéd	2016–17	Nemzeti Bajnokság I	32	0	2	0	–		–		34	0
Honvéd	2017–18	Nemzeti Bajnokság I	27	2	7	2	–		2 (Note: Appearances in UEFA Champions League)	0	36	4
Honvéd	2018–19	Nemzeti Bajnokság I	26	1	6	0	–		3 (Note: Appearances in UEFA Europa League)	0	35	1
Honvéd	2019–20	Nemzeti Bajnokság I	24	5	8	1	—		3	1	35	7
Honvéd	2020–21	Nemzeti Bajnokság I	30	13	2	5	–		2	0	34	18
Honvéd	Total		175	21	27	9	0	0	10	1	212	31
Philadelphia Union	2021	Major League Soccer	23	4	0	0	—		5 (Note: Three appearances in MLS Cup Playoffs, two appearances in CONCACAF Champions League)	1	28	5
Philadelphia Union	2022	Major League Soccer	34	22	1	0	—		3 (Note: Appearances in MLS Cup Playoffs)	2	38	24
Philadelphia Union	2023	Major League Soccer	32	14	1	0	—		15 (Note: Appearances in CONCACAF Champions League)	8	48	22
Philadelphia Union	2024	Major League Soccer	30	17	0	0	—		11	2	41	19
Philadelphia Union	2025	Major League Soccer	6	2	0	0	—		0	0	6	2
Philadelphia Union	Total		125	59	2	0	—		34	13	161	72
Columbus Crew	2025	Major League Soccer	26	4	0	0	—		6	0	32	4
Columbus Crew	2026	Major League Soccer	14	3	2	1	—		2	1	18	5
Columbus Crew	Total		40	7	2	1	—		8	1	50	9
Career total			366	88	31	10	0	0	52	15	449	113

=== International ===
As of match played on 15 June 2025

Appearances and goals by national team and year
National team	Year	Apps	Goals
Hungary	2019	1	0
Hungary	2020	3	0
Hungary	2021	7	3
Hungary	2022	7	1
Hungary	2023	5	0
Hungary	2024	4	0
Hungary	2025	3	0
Total		30	4

As of match played 14 June 2022

Scores and results list Hungary's goal tally first, score column indicates score after each Gazdag goal.

List of international goals scored by Dániel Gazdag
No.	Date	Venue	Opponent	Score	Result	Competition
1	31 March 2021	Estadi Nacional, Andorra la Vella, Andorra	Andorra	2–0	4–1	2022 FIFA World Cup qualification
2	12 November 2021	Puskás Aréna, Budapest, Hungary	San Marino	2–0	4–0	2022 FIFA World Cup qualification
3	15 November 2021	PGE Narodowy, Warsaw, Poland	Poland	2–1	2–1	2022 FIFA World Cup qualification
4	14 June 2022	Molineux Stadium, Wolverhampton, England	England	4–0	4–0	2022–23 UEFA Nations League A

== Honours ==
Honvéd

- Nemzeti Bajnokság I: 2016–17
- Magyar Kupa: 2019–20

Individual

- MLS Best XI: 2022
