= Gábor Buna =

Hungarian footballer (born 2002)

Personal information
- Full name: Gábor Buna
- Date of birth: 24 May 2002 (age 24)
- Place of birth: Kaposvár, Hungary
- Height: 1.82 m (6 ft 0 in)
- Position: Right back

Team information
- Current team: Tatabánya
- Number: 19

Youth career
- 2013–2014: Hévíz
- 2014–2015: Keszthely
- 2015–2020: Honvéd

Senior career*
Years	Team	Apps	(Gls)
2020–2021	Honvéd	1	(0)
2021–2023	Kecskemét	29	(0)
2022–2023	Kecskemét II	17	(1)
2023–2024	Győr	1	(0)
2023–2024	Győr II	10	(1)
2024–	Tatabánya	45	(2)

International career^{‡}
2018	Hungary U-16	6	(0)
2018–2019	Hungary U-17	14	(0)
2019	Hungary U-18	3	(0)
- * Club domestic league appearances and goals as of 10 June 2025 ‡ National team caps and goals as of 5 February 2020

Gábor Buna (born 24 May 2002) is a Hungarian football defender who plays for Nemzeti Bajnokság II club Tatabánya.

== Career ==
On 5 February 2020, he played his first match in a 0–0 draw against Ferencváros in the Nemzeti Bajnokság I.

On 14 June 2021, Buna moved to Kecskemét in the Nemzeti Bajnokság II.

== International career ==
Buna has represented Hungary internationally at youth levels. He played for the under-17 team at the 2019 FIFA U-17 World Cup.

== Career statistics ==
As of 1 December 2024

Appearances and goals by club, season and competition
Club	Season	League			National cup (Note: Includes Magyar Kupa)		Other		Total	
Club	Season	Division	Apps	Goals	Apps	Goals	Apps	Goals	Apps	Goals
Honvéd	2019–20	Nemzeti Bajnokság I	1	0	1	0	—		2	0
Honvéd II	2020–21	Nemzeti Bajnokság III	13	1	—		—		13	1
Kecskemét	2021–22	Nemzeti Bajnokság II	28	0	2	1	—		30	1
Kecskemét	2022–23	Nemzeti Bajnokság I	1	0	1	0	—		2	0
Kecskemét	Total		29	0	3	1	—		32	1
Kecskemét II	2022–23	Nemzeti Bajnokság III	17	1	—		—		17	1
Győr	2023–24	Nemzeti Bajnokság II	1	0	1	0	—		2	0
Győr II	2023–24	Nemzeti Bajnokság III	10	1	—		—		10	1
Tatabánya	2023–24	Nemzeti Bajnokság III	12	1	—		2 (Note: Appearances in Nemzeti Bajnokság III Promotion play-offs)	0	14	1
Tatabánya	2024–25	Nemzeti Bajnokság II	14	0	1	0	—		15	0
Tatabánya	Total		26	1	1	0	2	0	29	1
Career total			97	4	6	1	2	0	105	5
