= Bence Banó-Szabó =

Hungarian footballer

Personal information
- Full name: Zoltán Bence Banó-Szabó
- Date of birth: 25 July 1999 (age 27)
- Place of birth: Kecskemét, Hungary
- Height: 1.80 m (5 ft 11 in)
- Position: Midfielder

Team information
- Current team: Vasas
- Number: 8

Youth career
- 2009–2014: Kecskemét
- 2014–2017: Budapest Honvéd

Senior career*
Years	Team	Apps	(Gls)
2017–2022	Budapest Honvéd II	36	(4)
2017–2022	Budapest Honvéd	64	(1)
2022–2026	Kecskemét	62	(12)
2026–	Vasas	11	(2)

International career^{‡}
2017	Hungary U-18	1	(0)
2017–2018	Hungary U-19	9	(0)
2018–2019	Hungary U-21	8	(0)
- * Club domestic league appearances and goals as of 31 May 2026 ‡ National team caps and goals as of 18 November 2019

Bence Banó-Szabó (born 25 July 1999) is a Hungarian football player who plays for Vasas.

== Career ==
=== Budapest Honvéd ===
On 26 August 2017, Banó-Szabó played his first match for Budapest Honvéd in a 1–3 loss against Debrecen in the Hungarian League.

=== Kecskemét ===
In July 2022, Banó-Szabó returned to his former youth club Kecskemét.

== Career statistics ==
Appearances and goals by club, season and competition
Club	Season	League		Cup		Europe		Total	
Club	Season	Apps	Goals	Apps	Goals	Apps	Goals	Apps	Goals
Budapest Honvéd II
Budapest Honvéd II	2016–17	1	0	0	0	0	0	1	0
Budapest Honvéd II	2017–18	1	0	0	0	0	0	1	0
Budapest Honvéd II	2018–19	11	1	0	0	0	0	11	1
Budapest Honvéd II	2020–21	10	2	0	0	0	0	10	2
Budapest Honvéd II	2021–22	13	1	0	0	0	0	13	1
Budapest Honvéd II	Total	36	4	0	0	0	0	36	4
Budapest Honvéd
Budapest Honvéd	2017–18	26	0	3	0	0	0	29	0
Budapest Honvéd	2018–19	15	0	6	1	1	0	22	1
Budapest Honvéd	2019–20	18	1	5	1	4	1	27	3
Budapest Honvéd	2021–22	5	0	0	0	0	0	5	0
Budapest Honvéd	Total	64	1	14	2	5	1	83	4
Career total		100	5	14	2	5	1	119	8

Updated to games played as of 15 May 2022.
