= Dávid Stoiacovici =

Hungarian footballer (born 1999)

Personal information
- Full name: Dávid Tibor Stoiacovici
- Date of birth: 5 July 1999 (age 27)
- Place of birth: Budapest, Hungary
- Height: 1.70 m (5 ft 7 in)
- Position: Midfielder

Team information
- Current team: Pénzügyőr

Youth career
- 2007–2010: Kőbánya
- 2010–2016: Budapest Honvéd

Senior career*
Years	Team	Apps	(Gls)
2016–2019	Budapest Honvéd II	14	(1)
2017–2019	Budapest Honvéd	1	(0)
2018–2019	→ Tiszakécske (loan)	16	(0)
2019	→ Ajka (loan)	17	(3)
2020–2022	Ajka	30	(2)
2023–	Pénzügyőr	4	(0)

International career
2015	Hungary U-17	3	(0)
2017	Hungary U-18	7	(2)
2017–2018	Hungary U-19	7	(1)
- * Club domestic league appearances and goals as of 12 March 2023

Dávid Stoiacovici (born 5 July 1999) is a Hungarian football player who plays for Pénzügyőr.

== Career ==
=== Budapest Honvéd ===
On 18 November 2017, Stoiacovici played his first match for Budapest Honvéd in a 1–2 loss against Újpest in the Hungarian League.

== Career statistics ==
Appearances and goals by club, season and competition
Club	Season	League		Cup		Europe		Total	
Club	Season	Apps	Goals	Apps	Goals	Apps	Goals	Apps	Goals
Budapest Honvéd II
Budapest Honvéd II	2016–17	1	0	0	0	0	0	1	0
Budapest Honvéd II	2017–18	12	1	0	0	0	0	12	1
Budapest Honvéd II	2019–20	1	0	0	0	0	0	1	0
Budapest Honvéd II	Total	14	1	0	0	0	0	14	1
Budapest Honvéd
Budapest Honvéd	2017–18	1	0	1	0	0	0	2	0
Budapest Honvéd	Total	1	0	1	0	0	0	2	0
Tiszakécske
Tiszakécske	2018–19	16	0	3	0	0	0	19	0
Tiszakécske	Total	16	0	3	0	0	0	19	0
Ajka
Ajka	2019–20	17	3	0	0	0	0	17	3
Ajka	2020–21	0	0	0	0	0	0	0	0
Ajka	Total	17	3	0	0	0	0	17	3
Career total		48	4	4	0	0	0	52	4

Updated to games played as of 9 August 2020.
